= 2011 Lillestrøm SK season =

Lillestrøm
2011 season
- Chairman: Per Mathisen
- (caretaker): Petter Belsvik
- Stadium: Åråsen Stadion
- Tippeligaen: 13th
- Norwegian Cup: Fourth round vs Rosenborg
- Top goalscorer: League: Anthony Ujah (13); All: Anthony Ujah (13)
- Highest home attendance: 8,852 vs Molde; 16 May 2011
- Lowest home attendance: 1,607 vs Sandefjord; 25 May 2011
- Average home league attendance: 6,080

The 2011 season was Lillestrøm SK's 22nd season in the Tippeligaen, and their 38th consecutive season in the top division of Norwegian football. It is Henning Berg's third season as the club's manager. On 27 October 2011 with Lillestrom in 12th place, Henning Berg was sacked and replaced by Petter Belsvik who took on a Caretaker role.

== Squad ==
As of 29 September 2011

Note: Flags indicate national team as defined under FIFA eligibility rules; some limited exceptions apply. Players may hold more than one non-FIFA nationality.

No.	Pos.	Nation	Player
1	GK	ISL	Stefán Logi Magnússon
2	DF	NOR	Steinar Pedersen
3	DF	NOR	Lars Kristian Eriksen
4	MF	NGR	Paul Obiefule (on loan from Hønefoss)
5	MF	ISL	Stefán Gíslason
6	MF	NGR	Effiom Otu Bassey
8	FW	ISL	Björn Bergmann Sigurðarson
9	FW	NOR	Henrik Kjelsrud Johansen (on loan from Raufoss)
11	MF	NOR	Erling Knudtzon
13	DF	NOR	Frode Kippe (captain)
14	FW	NGR	Edwin Eziyodawe
15	FW	URU	Nicolás Mezquida (on loan from Peñarol)

No.	Pos.	Nation	Player
16	MF	NOR	Ohi Omoijuanfo
17	MF	NOR	Nicolay Solberg
18	FW	NOR	Arild Sundgot
19	FW	NOR	Fredrik Gulbrandsen
20	DF	NOR	Stian Ringstad
21	DF	TUN	Karim Essediri
22	MF	NOR	Kristoffer Tokstad
23	DF	NOR	Pål Steffen Andresen
26	MF	NOR	Mathis Bolly
28	MF	NOR	Ruben Gabrielsen
29	GK	NOR	Andreas Fjeldstad

=== Out on loan ===
Note: Flags indicate national team as defined under FIFA eligibility rules; some limited exceptions apply. Players may hold more than one non-FIFA nationality.

No.	Pos.	Nation	Player

=== Transfers ===
In: Note: Flags indicate national team as defined under FIFA eligibility rules; some limited exceptions apply. Players may hold more than one non-FIFA nationality.

No.	Pos.	Nation	Player
4	MF	NGR	Paul Obiefule (loan from (Norway) Hønefoss)
6	MF	NGR	Effiom Otu Bassey (from (Nigeria) ABS FC)
9	FW	NOR	Henrik Kjelsrud Johansen (loan from (Norway) Raufoss)
15	FW	URU	Nicolás Mezquida (loan from (Uruguay) Peñarol)

Out: Note: Flags indicate national team as defined under FIFA eligibility rules; some limited exceptions apply. Players may hold more than one non-FIFA nationality.

No.	Pos.	Nation	Player
12	GK	SWE	Alexander Nadj (released, joined (Sweden) Östers IF)
7	MF	NOR	Espen Søgård (to (Norway) IK Start)
9	FW	NGR	Anthony Ujah (to (Germany) Mainz 05)
10	FW	NGR	Nosa Igiebor (to (Israel) Hapoel Tel Aviv)
22	MF	NOR	Kristoffer Tokstad (loan to (Norway) Strømmen)

== Competitions ==
=== Tippeligaen ===
==== Results summary ====
Overall								Home						Away					
Pld	W	D	L	GF	GA	GD	Pts	W	D	L	GF	GA	GD	W	D	L	GF	GA	GD
30	9	7	14	46	52	−6	34	6	4	5	25	26	−1	3	3	9	21	26	−5

==== Results by round ====
Round	1	2	3	4	5	6	7	8	9	10	11	12	13	14	15	16	17	18	19	20	21	22	23	24	25	26	27	28	29	30
Ground	A	H	A	A	H	A	H	A	A	H	A	H	A	H	A	H	A	H	A	H	A	H	A	H	H	A	H	A	H	H
Result	W	L	D	D	W	D	L	L	W	D	L	W	L	W	W	W	L	W	W	L	L	L	L	L	L	D	L	D	L	D
Position	1	5	9	9	7	7	9	10	9	10	10	8	10	8	6	5	6	5	4	5	6	9	10	10	12	11	12	12	13	13

Updated to match(es) played on 27 November 2011. Source: see below
A = Away; H = Home; W = Win; D = Draw; L = Loss

==== Results ====
20 March 2011 1	Stabæk	0–7	Lillestrøm	Bærum
18:00 CET (UTC+1)		Report	Ujah 15', 27', 64', 69'; Igiebor 45', 48'; Omoijuanfo 79'	Stadium: Telenor Arena; Attendance: 8,107; Referee: Tom Hagen

4 April 2011 2	Lillestrøm	1–4	Brann	Lillestrøm
19:00 CEST (UTC+2)	Ujah 29'	Report	Ojo 7'; Guastavino 10'; Korcsmár 43'; Sævarsson 69'	Stadium: Åråsen Stadion; Attendance: 7,416; Referee: Brage Sandmoen

10 April 2011 3	Rosenborg	4–4	Lillestrøm	Trondheim
20:00 CEST (UTC+2)	Prica 27', 63' (pen.), 70', 89'	Report	Knudtzon 16'; Olsen 10' (og.); Igiebor 50'; Kippe 90+4'	Stadium: Lerkendal Stadion; Attendance: 11,717; Referee: Kristoffer Helgerud

17 April 2011 4	Vålerenga	1–1	Lillestrøm	Oslo
20:00 CEST (UTC+2)	Boakye 81'	Report	Knudtzon 53'	Stadium: Ullevaal Stadion; Attendance: 20,003; Referee: Tom Hagen

25 April 2011 5	Lillestrøm	5–0	Haugesund	Lillestrøm
16:00 CEST (UTC+2)	Sigurðarson 81'; Ujah 56', 60'; Igiebor 79', 86'	Report		Stadium: Åråsen Stadion; Attendance: 6,612; Referee: Kjetil Sælen

6 May 2011 6	Fredrikstad	1–1	Lillestrøm	Fredrikstad
19:00 CEST (UTC+2)	Tveter 68'; Martinsen (red card) 90'	Report	Ujah 76'	Stadium: Fredrikstad Stadion; Attendance: 9,262; Referee: Tom Ovrebo

16 May 2011 7	Lillestrøm	0–3	Molde	Lillestrøm
18:00 CEST (UTC+2)		Report	Hoseth 38' (pen.); Kippe 54' (o.g.); Moström 70'	Stadium: Åråsen Stadion; Attendance: 8,852; Referee: Svein Moen

19 May 2011 8	Sogndal	2–0	Lillestrøm	Sogndalsfjøra
19:00 CEST (UTC+2)	Hovland 83'; Halvorsen 85'	Report		Stadium: Fosshaugane Campus; Attendance: 2,186; Referee: Anders Johansen

28 May 2011 10	Sarpsborg 08	2–4	Lillestrøm	Sarpsborg
16:00 CEST (UTC+2)	Jørgensen 51'; Giæver 72'	Report	Igiebor 6'; Sigurðarson 16', 87'; Ujah 79' (pen.)	Stadium: Sarpsborg Stadion; Attendance: 3,552; Referee: Kjetil Saelen

13 June 2011 11	Lillestrøm	1–1	Odd Grenland	Lillestrøm
18:00 CEST (UTC+2)	Sundgot 76'	Report	Myklebust 52'	Stadium: Åråsen Stadion; Attendance: 5,363; Referee: Tom Hagen

16 June 2011 12	Tromsø	1–0	Lillestrøm	Tromsø
19:00 CEST (UTC+2)	Abdellaoue 30'	Report		Stadium: Alfheim Stadion; Attendance: 4,743; Referee: Per Staberg

19 June 2011 13	Lillestrøm	4–2	Strømsgodset	Lillestrøm
18:00 CEST (UTC+2)	Ujah 4', 46', 74', 78'	Report	Keita 77'; Sankoh 90+1'	Stadium: Åråsen Stadion; Attendance: 5,612; Referee: Svein Edvartsen

25 June 2011 14	Aalesund	1–0	Lillestrøm	Ålesund
18:00 CEST (UTC+2)	Sellin 45+1'	Report		Stadium: Color Line Stadion; Attendance: 9,425; Referee: Svein Edvartsen

29 June 2011 9	Lillestrøm	2–1	Start	Lillestrøm
18:00 CEST (UTC+2)	Pedersen 61'; Magnússon (red card) 78'; Sigurðarson 90'	Report	Årst 79' (pen.)	Stadium: Åråsen Stadion; Attendance: 5,285; Referee: Brage Sandmoen
Note: The match was postponed from 22 May 2011 due to the player strike.

3 July 2011 15	Lillestrøm	2–1	Viking	Lillestrøm
18:00 CEST (UTC+2)	Gabrielsen 27'; Gulbrandsen 28'	Report	Berisha 68'	Stadium: Åråsen Stadion; Attendance: 5,281; Referee: Kristoffer Helgerud

15 July 2011 16	Odd Grenland	1–3	Lillestrøm	Skien
19:00 CEST (UTC+2)	Brenne 31'	Report	Kippe 68'; Sigurðarson 90'; Omoijuanfo 90+1'	Stadium: Skagerak Arena; Attendance: 5,046; Referee: Tom Ovrebo

31 July 2011 18	Strømsgodset	3–1	Lillestrøm	Drammen
18:00 CEST (UTC+2)	Berget 11'; Kippe 45+1' (o.g.); Gabrielsen 49' (o.g.)	Report	Kippe 70'	Stadium: Marienlyst Stadion; Attendance: 5,875; Referee: Svein Moen

3 August 2011 17	Lillestrøm	3–2	Tromsø	Lillestrøm
18:00 CEST (UTC+2)	Omoijuanfo 79'; Igiebor 80', 88' (pen.)	Report	Andersen 23'; Abdellaoue 48'	Stadium: Åråsen Stadion; Attendance: 5,388; Referee: Kristoffer Helgerud
Note: The match was postponed from 24 July 2011 due to the 2011 Norway attacks.

7 August 2011 19	Lillestrøm	3–1	Sarpsborg 08	Lillestrøm
18:00 CEST (UTC+2)	Gulbrandsen 50', 78'; Bolly 88'	Report	Giæver 80'	Stadium: Åråsen Stadion; Attendance: 4,915; Referee: Espen Berntsen

22 August 2011 20	Molde	1–0	Lillestrøm	Molde
19:00 CEST (UTC+2)	Eikrem 29'	Report		Stadium: Aker Stadion; Attendance: 8,856; Referee: Ken Henry Johnsen

28 August 2011 21	Lillestrøm	0–3	Sogndal	Lillestrøm
18:00 CEST (UTC+2)		Report	Hopen 34'; Halvorsen 69'; Hovland 76'	Stadium: Åråsen Stadion; Attendance: 5,191; Referee: Trygve Kjensli

11 September 2011 22	Haugesund	2–0	Lillestrøm	Haugesund
18:00 CEST (UTC+2)	Andreassen 64'; Đurđić 76'	Report		Stadium: Haugesund Stadion; Attendance: 4,319; Referee: Tom Hagen

18 September 2011 23	Lillestrøm	0–1	Vålerenga	Lillestrøm
20:00 CEST (UTC+2)	Obiefule (yellow card) 44' (yellow-red card) 90+3'	Report	Nielsen 72'	Stadium: Åråsen Stadion; Attendance: 8,344; Referee: Svein Edvartsen

25 September 2011 24	Start	3–0	Lillestrøm	Kristiansand
18:00 CEST (UTC+2)	Johannesen 34'; Hoff 73', 85'	Report		Stadium: Sør Arena; Attendance: 5,749; Referee: Anders Johansen

30 September 2011 25	Lillestrøm	2–5	Rosenborg	Lillestrøm
19:00 CEST (UTC+2)	Gíslason 36' (pen.); Gulbrandsen 83'	Report	Moldskred 58', 90'; Larsen 63'; Dočkal 79'; Prica 86'	Stadium: Åråsen Stadion; Attendance: 6,818; Referee: Svein Moen

15 October 2011 26	Lillestrøm	1–1	Stabæk	Lillestrøm
18:00 CEST (UTC+2)	Bolly 26'	Report	Ollé Ollé 73'	Stadium: Åråsen Stadion; Attendance: 4,594; Referee: Tom Hagen

23 October 2011 27	Viking	2–0	Lillestrøm	Stavanger
18:00 CEST (UTC+2)	Danielsen 30', 33'	Report		Stadium: Viking Stadion; Attendance: 9,141; Referee: Per Staberg

30 October 2011 28	Lillestrøm	1–1	Aalesund	Lillestrøm
18:00 CET (UTC+1)	Gíslason 68'	Report	Skagestad 30'	Stadium: Åråsen Stadion; Attendance: 5,633; Referee: Anders Johansen

20 November 2011 29	Brann	2–0	Lillestrøm	Bergen
18:00 CET (UTC+1)	Austin 27' (pen.); Ojo 72'	Report	Andresen (red card) 27'; Eriksen (red card) 90+1'	Stadium: Brann Stadion; Attendance: 13,004; Referee: Svein Moen

27 November 2011 30	Lillestrøm	0–0	Fredrikstad	Lillestrøm
18:00 CET (UTC+1)		Report		Stadium: Åråsen Stadion; Attendance: 4,853; Referee: Tom Ovrebo

==== Table ====
Pos	Team	Pld	W	D	L	GF	GA	GD	Pts	Qualification or relegation
11	Viking	30	9	10	11	33	40	−7	37	
12	Fredrikstad	30	10	6	14	38	41	−3	36	
13	Lillestrøm	30	9	7	14	46	52	−6	34	
14	Sogndal	30	8	10	12	24	31	−7	34	
15	Start (R)	30	7	5	18	39	61	−22	26	Relegation to First Division

Source: fotball.no
Rules for classification: 1) points; 2) goal difference; 3) number of goals scored.
(R) Relegated

=== Norwegian Cup ===
1 May 2011 First Round	Fu/Vo	0–3	Lillestrøm	Oppåkermoen
18:00 CEST (UTC+2)		Report	Andresen 26'; Gulbrandsen 64'; Kippe 86'	Stadium: Funnefoss Stadion; Attendance: 1,523; Referee: Ole-Alexander Valen

11 May 2011 Second Round	Gjøvik	0–2	Lillestrøm	Gjøvik
18:00 CEST (UTC+2)		Report	Igiebor 77'; Sigurdarson 84'	Stadium: Gjøvik Stadion; Attendance: 1,725; Referee: Kristoffer Leirdal

25 May 2011 Third Round	Lillestrøm	0–0 (a.e.t.) (5–4 p)	Sandefjord	Lillestrøm
18:00 CEST (UTC+2)		Report		Stadium: Åråsen Stadion; Attendance: 1,607; Referee: Tom Harald Hagen
	Penalties
	Igiebor (penalty scored); N.Solberg (penalty scored); Ujah (penalty scored); Pedersen (penalty scored); Kippe (penalty scored)		(penalty scored) Dokken; (penalty scored) Gabrielsen; (penalty missed) Nystuen; (penalty scored) B.Stokke; (penalty scored) Sohna

22 June 2011 Fourth Round	Rosenborg	2–2 (a.e.t.) (4–1 p)	Lillestrøm	Trondheim
19:35 CEST (UTC+2)	Dorsin 6'; Lustig 110'	Report	B. Sigurðarson 74', 102'	Stadium: Lerkendal Stadion; Attendance: 5,012; Referee: Tommy Skjerven
	Penalties
	Winsnes (penalty scored); Olsen (penalty scored); Lustig (penalty scored); Prica (penalty scored)		(penalty scored) Ujah; (penalty missed) Pedersen; (penalty missed) Igiebor

== Squad statistics ==
=== Appearances and goals ===
No.	Pos	Nat	Player	Total		Tippeligaen		Norwegian Cup	
No.	Pos	Nat	Player	Apps	Goals	Apps	Goals	Apps	Goals
1	GK	(Iceland) ISL	Stefán Logi Magnússon	33	0	29+0	0	4+0	0
2	DF	(Norway) NOR	Steinar Pedersen	33	1	29+0	1	4+0	0
3	DF	(Norway) NOR	Lars Kristian Eriksen	30	0	27+0	0	2+1	0
4	MF	(Nigeria) NGR	Paul Obiefule	12	0	10+2	0	0+0	0
5	MF	(Iceland) ISL	Stefán Gíslason	17	2	13+2	2	2+0	0
6	MF	(Nigeria) NGR	Effiom Otu Bassey	3	0	2+1	0	0+0	0
8	FW	(Iceland) ISL	Björn Bergmann Sigurðarson	23	8	20+0	5	2+1	3
9	FW	(Norway) NOR	Henrik Kjelsrud Johansen	4	0	0+4	0	0+0	0
11	MF	(Norway) NOR	Erling Knudtzon	23	2	18+3	2	1+1	0
13	DF	(Norway) NOR	Frode Kippe	29	4	25+0	3	4+0	1
15	FW	(Uruguay) URU	Nicolás Mezquida	1	0	0+1	0	0+0	0
16	MF	(Norway) NOR	Ohi Omoijuanfo	24	3	12+9	3	3+0	0
17	MF	(Norway) NOR	Nicolay Solberg	10	0	2+5	0	2+1	0
18	FW	(Norway) NOR	Arild Sundgot	4	1	0+4	1	0+0	0
19	FW	(Norway) NOR	Fredrik Gulbrandsen	25	5	19+3	4	1+2	1
20	DF	(Norway) NOR	Stian Ringstad	20	0	14+5	0	1+0	0
21	DF	(Tunisia) TUN	Karim Essediri	31	0	26+2	0	3+0	0
23	MF	(Norway) NOR	Pål Steffen Andresen	18	1	10+6	0	2+0	1
24	DF	(Norway) NOR	Marius Høibråten	2	0	0+1	0	0+1	0
26	MF	(Norway) NOR	Mathis Bolly	16	2	7+9	2	0+0	0
28	MF	(Norway) NOR	Ruben Gabrielsen	27	1	21+3	1	3+0	0
29	GK	(Norway) NOR	Andreas Fjeldstad	1	0	1+0	0	0+0	0
31	DF	(Norway) NOR	Marius Amundsen	1	0	0+0	0	0+1	0
	DF	(Norway) NOR	Simen Rustadbakken	1	0	0+0	0	0+1	0
Players who left Lillestrøm on loan:
22	MF	(Norway) NOR	Kristoffer Tokstad	3	0	3+0	0	0+0	0
Players who appeared for Lillestrøm no longer at the club:
12	GK	(Sweden) SWE	Alexander Nadj	1	0	0+1	0	0+0	0
7	MF	(Norway) NOR	Espen Søgård	21	0	16+1	0	4+0	0
9	FW	(Nigeria) NGR	Anthony Ujah	15	13	12+0	13	3+0	0
10	FW	(Nigeria) NGR	Nosa Igiebor	20	9	14+3	8	3+0	1

=== Goal scorers ===
Place	Position	Nation	Number	Name	Tippeligaen	Norwegian Cup	Total
1	FW	(Nigeria)	9	Anthony Ujah	13	0	13
2	FW	(Nigeria)	10	Nosa Igiebor	8	1	9
3	FW	(Iceland)	8	Björn Bergmann Sigurðarson	5	3	8
4	FW	(Norway)	19	Fredrik Gulbrandsen	4	0	4
4	DF	(Norway)	13	Frode Kippe	3	1	4
6	MF	(Norway)	16	Ohi Omoijuanfo	3	0	3
7	MF	(Norway)	11	Erling Knudtzon	2	0	2
7	MF	(Norway)	26	Mathis Bolly	2	0	2
7	MF	(Iceland)	5	Stefán Gíslason	2	0	2
10	MF	(Norway)	18	Arild Sundgot	1	0	1
10	DF	(Norway)	2	Steinar Pedersen	1	0	1
10	DF	(Norway)	28	Ruben Gabrielsen	1	0	1
10				Own Goals	1	0	1
10	MF	(Norway)	23	Pål Steffen Andresen	0	1	1
10	FW	(Norway)	19	Fredrik Gulbrandsen	0	1	1
				TOTALS	46	7	53

=== Disciplinary record ===
Number	Nation	Position	Name	Tippeligaen		Norwegian Cup		Total	
Number	Nation	Position	Name	Yellow card	Red card	Yellow card	Red card	Yellow card	Red card
1	(Iceland)	GK	Stefán Logi Magnússon	1	1	0	0	1	1
2	(Norway)	DF	Steinar Pedersen	4	0	1	0	5	0
3	(Norway)	DF	Lars Kristian Eriksen	6	1	1	0	7	1
4	(Nigeria)	MF	Paul Obiefule	3	1	0	0	3	1
5	(Iceland)	MF	Stefán Gíslason	5	0	1	0	6	0
6	(Nigeria)	MF	Effiom Otu Bassey	2	0	0	0	2	0
7	(Norway)	MF	Espen Søgård	3	0	0	0	3	0
8	(Iceland)	FW	Björn Bergmann Sigurðarson	1	0	0	0	1	0
9	(Norway)	FW	Henrik Kjelsrud Johansen	2	0	0	0	2	0
10	(Nigeria)	FW	Nosa Igiebor	3	0	1	0	4	0
13	(Norway)	DF	Frode Kippe	5	0	0	0	5	0
17	(Norway)	FW	Nicolay Solberg	0	0	1	0	1	0
19	(Norway)	FW	Fredrik Gulbrandsen	4	0	0	0	4	0
20	(Norway)	DF	Stian Ringstad	4	0	0	0	4	0
21	(Tunisia)	DF	Karim Essediri	2	0	0	0	2	0
23	(Norway)	MF	Pål Steffen Andresen	2	1	0	0	2	1
26	(Norway)	MF	Mathis Bolly	2	0	0	0	2	0
28	(Norway)	MF	Ruben Gabrielsen	2	0	0	0	2	0
			TOTALS	51	4	5	0	55	4
