= 2017 Norwegian Football Cup final =

- Event: 2017 Norwegian Football Cup
Lillestrøm	Sarpsborg 08
3	2
- Date: 3 December 2017
- Venue: Ullevaal Stadion, Oslo
- Referee: Ola Hobber Nilsen
- Attendance: 25,091

The 2017 Norwegian Football Cup final was the final match of the 2017 Norwegian Football Cup, the 112th season of the Norwegian Football Cup, the premier Norwegian football cup competition organized by the Football Association of Norway (NFF). The match was played on 3 December 2017 at the Ullevaal Stadion in Oslo, and opposed two Eliteserien sides Lillestrøm and Sarpsborg 08. Lillestrøm defeated Sarpsborg 08 3–2 to claim the Norwegian Cup for a sixth time in their history and a first since 2007.

== Route to the final ==
Lillestrøm		Round	Sarpsborg 08	
Skjetten (D3); A 2–0	Ajeti 27', Škoda 47'	First round	Drøbak-Frogn (D3); A 10–1	Fejzullahu 3', 11', 19', Diatta 21', 30', 86', Trondsen 23', Larsen 45', 78', 90+2'
Brumunddal (D2); A 3–1	Ajeti 25', Melgalvis 52', Škoda 83'	Second round	Moss (D3); A 3–1	Heintz 28', Mortensen 67', Fejzullahu 90+3'
Ull/Kisa (D1); A 4–2	Innocent 27', Rafn 30', Mikalsen 67', Kippe 87'	Third round	Kongsvinger (D1); A 4–0	Mortensen 14', Nielsen 43', Halvorsen 63', Zachariassen 66'
Tromsø (ES); H 1–0	Tagbajumi 57'	Fourth round	Odd (ES); H 4–0	Rossbach 38' o.g., 41' o.g., Diatta 47', Trondsen 52'
Stabæk (ES); H 3–1	Melgalvis 21', Tagbajumi 56', Krogstad 90+2'	Quarter-final	Mjøndalen (D1); A 2–1	Zachariassen 66', Heintz 85'
Molde (ES); A 3–0	Mikalsen 75', Knudtzon 87', Melgalvis 90+1'	Semi-final	Vålerenga (ES); A 3–0	Diatta 25', Halvorsen 59', 90'

- (ES) = Eliteserien team
- (D1) = 1. divisjon team
- (D2) = 2. divisjon team
- (D3) = 3. divisjon team

== Match ==
=== Details ===
3 December 2017
13:15 CET (UTC+1)

Lillestrøm	3–2	Sarpsborg 08
Mikalsen 2'; Haakenstad 12'; Kippe 59'	Report	Mortensen 24'; Kippe 64' (o.g.)

Ullevaal Stadion, Oslo
Attendance: 25,091
Referee: Ola Hobber Nilsen (Nordstrand)

Lillestrøm	Sarpsborg 08

Lillestrøm:
GK	77	(Kenya) Arnold Origi Otieno
RB	2	(Norway) Mats Haakenstad
CB	4	(Norway) Marius Amundsen
CB	13	(Norway) Frode Kippe (c)
LB	5	(Norway) Simen Rafn
RM	33	(Norway) Aleksander Melgalvis	(substituted off) 83'
CM	14	(Norway) Fredrik Krogstad
CM	6	(Nigeria) Ifeanyi Mathew
LM	3	(Norway) Simen Kind Mikalsen
CF	23	(Bulgaria) Chigozie Udoji	(yellow card) 89'	(substituted off) 89'
CF	11	(Norway) Erling Knudtzon	(substituted off) 90'
Substitutions:
GK	1	(Croatia) Marko Marić
FW	7	(Nigeria) Moses Ebiye
MF	8	(Nigeria) Charles Ezeh
FW	10	(Nigeria) Marco Tagbajumi	(substituted on) 90'
MF	15	(Norway) Erik Næsbak Brenden	(substituted on) 83'
MF	22	(United States) Stefan Antonijevic	(substituted on) 89'
DF	24	(Norway) Erik Sandberg
Head coach:
(Norway) Arne Erlandsen

Sarpsborg 08:
GK	1	(Norway) Anders Kristiansen
RB	77	(Ethiopia) Amin Askar
CB	11	(Norway) Joackim Jørgensen
CB	15	(Norway) Sigurd Rosted
LB	16	(Norway) Joachim Thomassen (c)
RM	7	(Norway) Ole Jørgen Halvorsen
CM	8	(Denmark) Matti Lund Nielsen
CM	6	(Denmark) Nicolai Poulsen
LM	17	(Norway) Kristoffer Zachariassen
CF	19	(Senegal) Krépin Diatta
CF	69	(Denmark) Patrick Mortensen
Substitutions:
GK	1	(Serbia) Stefan Čupić
FW	10	(Sweden) Jonas Lindberg
DF	13	(Norway) Ole Christoffer Heieren Hansen
MF	14	(Norway) Tobias Heintz
MF	18	(Norway) Tor Øyvind Hovda
DF	20	(Norway) Anders Østli
MF	22	(Norway) Jon-Helge Tveita
Head coach:
(Norway) Geir Bakke

MATCH OFFICIALS

- Assistant referees:
  - Geir-Oskar Isaksen (Ramfjord)
  - Anders Michael Velo (Furuset)
- Fourth official: Kai Erik Steen (Gneist)

MATCH RULES

- 90 minutes.
- 30 minutes of extra-time if necessary.
- Penalty shoot-out if scores still level.
- Seven named substitutes.
- Maximum of three substitutions.

== See also ==
- 2017 Norwegian Football Cup
- 2017 Eliteserien
- 2017 1. divisjon
- 2017 in Norwegian football
