= 2017 in Norwegian football =

Football in Norway
- Season: 2017

Men's football
- Eliteserien: Rosenborg
- 1. divisjon: Bodø/Glimt
- 2. divisjon: HamKam (Group 1); Nest-Sotra (Group 2)
- Cupen: Lillestrøm
- Mesterfinalen: Rosenborg

Women's football
- Toppserien: LSK Kvinner
- 1. divisjon: Lyn
- Cupen: Avaldsnes

The 2017 in Norwegian football season was the 112th season of competitive football in Norway.

The season began in March and ended in December with the 2017 Norwegian Football Cup Final.

== Men's football ==
=== Promotion and relegation ===
League	Promoted to league	Relegated from league
Eliteserien	Kristiansund; Sandefjord	Bodø/Glimt; Start
1. divisjon	Tromsdalen; Elverum; Florø; Arendal	Bryne; Hødd; KFUM Oslo; Raufoss
2. divisjon	None	28 teams

=== League season ===
==== Eliteserien ====
Pos	Team	Pld	W	D	L	GF	GA	GD	Pts	Qualification or relegation
1	Rosenborg (C)	30	18	7	5	57	20	+37	61	Qualification for the Champions League first qualifying round
2	Molde	30	16	6	8	50	35	+15	54	Qualification for the Europa League first qualifying round
3	Sarpsborg 08	30	13	12	5	50	36	+14	51	Qualification for the Europa League first qualifying round
4	Strømsgodset	30	14	8	8	45	37	+8	50	
5	Brann	30	13	8	9	51	36	+15	47	
6	Odd	30	12	6	12	27	39	−12	42	
7	Kristiansund	30	10	10	10	44	46	−2	40	
8	Vålerenga	30	11	6	13	48	46	+2	39	
9	Stabæk	30	10	9	11	46	50	−4	39	
10	Haugesund	30	11	6	13	35	39	−4	39	
11	Tromsø	30	10	8	12	42	49	−7	38	
12	Lillestrøm	30	10	7	13	40	43	−3	37	Qualification for the Europa League second qualifying round (Note: Lillestrøm qualified for the Europa League second qualifying round as winners of the 2017 Norwegian Cup.)
13	Sandefjord	30	11	3	16	38	51	−13	36	
14	Sogndal (R)	30	8	8	14	38	48	−10	32	Qualification for the relegation play-offs
15	Aalesund (R)	30	8	8	14	38	50	−12	32	Relegation to First Division
16	Viking (R)	30	6	6	18	33	57	−24	24	Relegation to First Division

Source: Football Association of Norway (in Norwegian), Soccerway
Rules for classification: 1) Points; 2) Goal difference; 3) Goals scored; 4) Head-to-head points; 5) Head-to-head goal difference; 6) Head-to-head away goals scored (only if between two teams); 7) Head-to-head goals scored; 8) Play-off (only used to decide champions or relegation).
(C) Champions; (R) Relegated

==== 1. divisjon ====
Pos	Team	Pld	W	D	L	GF	GA	GD	Pts	Promotion, qualification or relegation
1	Bodø/Glimt (C, P)	30	22	5	3	83	33	+50	71	Promotion to Eliteserien
2	Start (P)	30	16	7	7	57	36	+21	55	Promotion to Eliteserien
3	Mjøndalen	30	15	7	8	56	37	+19	52	Qualification for the promotion play-offs
4	Ranheim (O, P)	30	15	7	8	48	39	+9	52	Qualification for the promotion play-offs
5	Sandnes Ulf	30	14	9	7	44	39	+5	51	Qualification for the promotion play-offs
6	Ull/Kisa	30	15	3	12	61	55	+6	48	Qualification for the promotion play-offs
7	Levanger	30	10	12	8	39	36	+3	42	
8	Florø	30	10	8	12	42	46	−4	38	
9	Tromsdalen	30	9	10	11	43	43	0	37	
10	Kongsvinger	30	10	6	14	47	46	+1	36	
11	Strømmen	30	9	9	12	39	47	−8	36	
12	Åsane	30	7	12	11	38	56	−18	33	
13	Jerv	30	8	8	14	44	59	−15	32	
14	Fredrikstad (R)	30	5	11	14	33	51	−18	26	Qualification for the relegation play-offs
15	Elverum (R)	30	4	12	14	29	51	−22	24	Relegation to Second Division
16	Arendal (R)	30	5	6	19	33	62	−29	21	Relegation to Second Division

Source: nifs.no (in Norwegian), Soccerway
Rules for classification: 1) Points; 2) Goal difference; 3) Goals scored; 4) Head-to-head points; 5) Head-to-head goal difference; 6) Head-to-head away goals scored (only if between two teams); 7) Head-to-head goals scored; 8) Play-off (only used to decide champions or relegation).
(C) Champions; (O) Play-off winners; (P) Promoted; (R) Relegated

==== 2. divisjon ====
===== Group 1 =====
Pos	Team	Pld	W	D	L	GF	GA	GD	Pts	Promotion, qualification or relegation
1	HamKam (P)	26	21	2	3	56	18	+38	65	Promotion to First Division
2	Raufoss	26	14	5	7	53	28	+25	47	Qualification for the promotion play-offs
3	Asker	26	13	8	5	50	36	+14	47	
4	Alta	26	13	7	6	42	24	+18	46	
5	Skeid	26	13	5	8	42	27	+15	44	
6	Grorud	26	11	4	11	43	49	−6	37	
7	KFUM-Oslo	26	10	4	12	43	39	+4	34	
8	Kjelsås	26	9	7	10	34	40	−6	34	
9	Bærum	26	8	9	9	46	44	+2	33	
10	Nybergsund-Trysil	26	9	4	13	40	46	−6	31	
11	Vålerenga 2	26	8	3	15	28	52	−24	27	
12	Finnsnes (R)	26	6	4	16	26	45	−19	22	Relegation to Third Division
13	Brumunddal (R)	26	6	4	16	21	46	−25	22	Relegation to Third Division
14	Follo (R)	26	6	4	16	28	58	−30	22	Relegation to Third Division

Source: nifs.no
Rules for classification: 1) points; 2) goal difference; 3) number of goals scored.
(P) Promoted; (R) Relegated

===== Group 2 =====
Pos	Team	Pld	W	D	L	GF	GA	GD	Pts	Promotion, qualification or relegation
1	Nest-Sotra (P)	26	15	9	2	60	22	+38	54	Promotion to First Division
2	Notodden (O, P)	26	17	3	6	53	26	+27	54	Qualification for the promotion play-offs
3	Bryne	26	13	8	5	52	37	+15	47	
4	Vidar	26	13	3	10	56	49	+7	42	
5	Fram Larvik	26	12	6	8	49	43	+6	42	
6	Hødd	26	11	7	8	44	37	+7	40	
7	Nardo	26	12	4	10	29	35	−6	40	
8	Vard Haugesund	26	12	3	11	33	36	−3	39	
9	Egersund	26	8	10	8	40	29	+11	34	
10	Hønefoss	26	9	5	12	35	41	−6	32	
11	Odd 2	26	7	5	14	51	69	−18	26	
12	Vindbjart (R)	26	6	4	16	44	58	−14	22	Relegation to Third Division
13	Fana (R)	26	5	7	14	30	64	−34	22	Relegation to Third Division
14	Byåsen (R)	26	3	4	19	22	52	−30	13	Relegation to Third Division

Source: nifs.no
Rules for classification: 1) points; 2) goal difference; 3) number of goals scored.
(O) Play-off winners; (P) Promoted; (R) Relegated

==== 3. divisjon ====
===== Group 1 =====
Pos	Team	Pld	W	D	L	GF	GA	GD	Pts	Promotion or relegation
1	Moss (P)	26	20	3	3	88	22	+66	63	Promotion to Second Division
2	Ørn Horten	26	16	4	6	60	29	+31	52	
3	Kvik Halden	26	15	4	7	77	36	+41	49	
4	Oppsal	26	14	3	9	58	49	+9	45	
5	Kråkerøy	26	12	4	10	35	35	0	40	
6	Vestfossen	26	13	1	12	46	49	−3	40	
7	Ullern	26	11	6	9	40	38	+2	39	
8	Drøbak/Frogn	26	10	6	10	56	53	+3	36	
9	Strømsgodset 2	26	11	3	12	48	56	−8	36	
10	Østsiden	26	10	5	11	54	44	+10	35	
11	Sarpsborg 08 2 (R)	26	10	5	11	55	54	+1	35	Relegation to Fourth Division
12	Sprint-Jeløy (R)	26	8	2	16	36	62	−26	26	Relegation to Fourth Division
13	Holmen (R)	26	4	5	17	22	65	−43	17	Relegation to Fourth Division
14	Odd 3 (R)	26	2	1	23	28	111	−83	7	Relegation to Fourth Division

Source: NIFS (in Norwegian)
Rules for classification: 1) Points; 2) Goal difference; 3) Goals scored; 4) Head-to-head points; 5) Head-to-head goal difference; 6) Head-to-head goals scored.
(P) Promoted; (R) Relegated

===== Group 2 =====
Pos	Team	Pld	W	D	L	GF	GA	GD	Pts	Promotion or relegation
1	Stabæk 2 (P)	26	21	0	5	98	25	+73	63	Promotion to Second Division
2	Lyn	26	20	3	3	71	35	+36	62 (Note: Lyn have been deducted 1 point due to the use of an ineligible player.)	
3	Eidsvold Turn	26	19	1	6	60	24	+36	58	
4	Korsvoll	26	14	4	8	51	38	+13	46	
5	Tynset	26	12	2	12	37	49	−12	38	
6	Frigg	26	11	3	12	55	44	+11	36	
7	Gjøvik-Lyn	26	10	4	12	47	61	−14	34	
8	Valdres	26	10	3	13	39	43	−4	33	
9	Lokomotiv Oslo	26	9	6	11	36	44	−8	33	
10	Ready	26	9	3	14	43	56	−13	30	
11	Lillehammer (R)	26	8	5	13	54	57	−3	29	Relegation to Fourth Division
12	Flisa (R)	26	6	3	17	32	76	−44	21	Relegation to Fourth Division
13	Raufoss 2 (R)	26	5	5	16	32	58	−26	20	Relegation to Fourth Division
14	Redalen (R)	26	4	6	16	34	79	−45	18	Relegation to Fourth Division

Source: NIFS (in Norwegian)
Rules for classification: 1) Points; 2) Goal difference; 3) Goals scored; 4) Head-to-head points; 5) Head-to-head goal difference; 6) Head-to-head goals scored.
(P) Promoted; (R) Relegated

===== Group 3 =====
Pos	Team	Pld	W	D	L	GF	GA	GD	Pts	Promotion or relegation
1	Fløy (P)	26	21	2	3	76	29	+47	65	Promotion to Second Division
2	Pors	26	16	3	7	84	43	+41	51	
3	Madla	26	12	6	8	52	48	+4	42	
4	Tønsberg	26	11	7	8	48	41	+7	40	
5	Sola	26	11	5	10	46	35	+11	38	
6	Viking 2	26	11	4	11	52	53	−1	37	
7	Start 2	26	11	3	12	49	43	+6	36	
8	Halsen	26	11	2	13	61	69	−8	35	
9	Staal Jørpeland	26	10	3	13	59	63	−4	33	
10	Brodd	26	9	6	11	47	53	−6	33	
11	Sandnes Ulf 2 (R)	26	9	4	13	50	59	−9	31	Relegation to Fourth Division
12	Lura (R)	26	8	6	12	36	52	−16	30	Relegation to Fourth Division
13	Bryne 2 (R)	26	8	6	12	41	70	−29	30	Relegation to Fourth Division
14	Express (R)	26	3	5	18	28	71	−43	14	Relegation to Fourth Division

Source: NIFS (in Norwegian)
Rules for classification: 1) Points; 2) Goal difference; 3) Goals scored; 4) Head-to-head points; 5) Head-to-head goal difference; 6) Head-to-head goals scored.
(P) Promoted; (R) Relegated

===== Group 4 =====
Pos	Team	Pld	W	D	L	GF	GA	GD	Pts	Promotion or relegation
1	Brattvåg (P)	26	17	5	4	78	27	+51	56	Promotion to Second Division
2	Lysekloster	26	17	5	4	55	32	+23	56	
3	Herd	26	12	6	8	57	48	+9	42	
4	Fyllingsdalen	26	12	5	9	61	50	+11	41	
5	Sotra	26	12	5	9	52	43	+9	41	
6	Varegg	26	12	4	10	51	54	−3	40	
7	Spjelkavik	26	8	11	7	45	44	+1	35	
8	Førde	26	9	7	10	47	49	−2	34	
9	Brann 2	26	8	6	12	48	47	+1	30	
10	Stord	26	8	6	12	48	58	−10	30	
11	Os (R)	26	8	6	12	45	55	−10	30	Relegation to Fourth Division
12	Haugesund 2 (R)	26	7	6	13	37	60	−23	27	Relegation to Fourth Division
13	Fjøra (R)	26	7	5	14	41	73	−32	26	Relegation to Fourth Division
14	Aalesund 2 (R)	26	4	5	17	35	60	−25	17	Relegation to Fourth Division

Source: NIFS (in Norwegian)
Rules for classification: 1) Points; 2) Goal difference; 3) Goals scored; 4) Head-to-head points; 5) Head-to-head goal difference; 6) Head-to-head goals scored.
(P) Promoted; (R) Relegated

===== Group 5 =====
Pos	Team	Pld	W	D	L	GF	GA	GD	Pts	Promotion or relegation
1	Stjørdals-Blink (P)	26	19	2	5	81	45	+36	59	Promotion to Second Division
2	Kolstad	26	13	4	9	66	53	+13	43	
3	Steinkjer	26	12	4	10	65	61	+4	40	
4	Junkeren	26	11	6	9	61	59	+2	39	
5	Rosenborg 2	26	10	7	9	68	43	+25	37	
6	Orkla	26	10	7	9	54	51	+3	37	
7	Molde 2	26	12	1	13	52	53	−1	37	
8	Verdal	26	9	10	7	43	44	−1	37	
9	Træff	26	10	6	10	45	48	−3	36	
10	Tillerbyen	26	10	5	11	47	50	−3	35	
11	Mo (R)	26	10	4	12	54	63	−9	34	Relegation to Fourth Division
12	Strindheim (R)	26	9	5	12	53	64	−11	32	Relegation to Fourth Division
13	Sverresborg (R)	26	6	5	15	56	78	−22	23	Relegation to Fourth Division
14	Mosjøen (R)	26	6	4	16	41	74	−33	22	Relegation to Fourth Division

Source: NIFS (in Norwegian)
Rules for classification: 1) Points; 2) Goal difference; 3) Goals scored; 4) Head-to-head points; 5) Head-to-head goal difference; 6) Head-to-head goals scored.
(P) Promoted; (R) Relegated

===== Group 6 =====
Pos	Team	Pld	W	D	L	GF	GA	GD	Pts	Promotion or relegation
1	Mjølner (P)	26	20	2	4	72	31	+41	62	Promotion to Second Division
2	Senja	26	17	0	9	63	33	+30	51	
3	Sortland	26	14	3	9	48	42	+6	45	
4	Skjetten	26	13	3	10	46	43	+3	42	
5	Lørenskog	26	12	5	9	54	36	+18	41	
6	Harstad	26	11	6	9	44	39	+5	39	
7	Skjervøy	26	11	4	11	58	65	−7	37	
8	Fløya	26	9	8	9	42	39	+3	35	
9	Lillestrøm 2	26	10	5	11	43	43	0	35	
10	Skedsmo	26	9	8	9	39	41	−2	35	
11	Fu/Vo (R)	26	10	5	11	46	50	−4	35	Relegation to Fourth Division
12	Tromsø 2 (R)	26	6	6	14	42	64	−22	24	Relegation to Fourth Division
13	Alta 2 (R)	26	5	3	18	23	64	−41	18	Relegation to Fourth Division
14	Salangen (R)	26	5	2	19	43	73	−30	17	Relegation to Fourth Division

Source: NIFS (in Norwegian)
Rules for classification: 1) Points; 2) Goal difference; 3) Goals scored; 4) Head-to-head points; 5) Head-to-head goal difference; 6) Head-to-head goals scored.
(P) Promoted; (R) Relegated

=== Cup competitions ===
==== Norwegian Cup ====
===== Final =====
3 December 2017
13:15 CET (UTC+1)

Lillestrøm	3–2	Sarpsborg 08
Mikalsen 2'; Haakenstad 12'; Kippe 59'	Report	Mortensen 24'; Kippe 64' (o.g.)

Ullevaal Stadion, Oslo
Attendance: 25,091
Referee: Ola Hobber Nilsen (Nordstrand)

==== Mesterfinalen ====
Match details

29 March 2017
19:00 CEST

Brann	0–2	Rosenborg
	Report	Jevtović 32'; Reginiussen 90+4'

Brann Stadion, Bergen
Attendance: 10,681
Referee: Svein Oddvar Moen (Haugar)

== Women's football ==
=== Promotion and relegation ===
Teams promoted to Toppserien

- Grand Bodø

Teams relegated from Toppserien

- Urædd

=== League season ===
==== Toppserien ====
Pos	Team	Pld	W	D	L	GF	GA	GD	Pts	Qualification or relegation
1	LSK Kvinner (C)	22	19	2	1	68	18	+50	59	Qualification for the Champions League round of 32
2	Avaldsnes	22	15	3	4	51	17	+34	48	Qualification for the Champions League qualifying round
3	Stabæk	22	13	4	5	46	23	+23	43	
4	Klepp	22	12	4	6	34	24	+10	40	
5	Røa	22	11	4	7	42	28	+14	37	
6	Arna-Bjørnar	22	9	8	5	39	28	+11	35	
7	Vålerenga	22	10	4	8	38	33	+5	34	
8	Trondheims-Ørn	22	8	6	8	36	36	0	30	
9	Sandviken	22	4	6	12	23	34	−11	18	
10	Kolbotn	22	4	3	15	17	43	−26	15	
11	Grand Bodø (O)	22	2	2	18	30	80	−50	8	Qualification for the relegation play-offs
12	Medkila (R)	22	1	2	19	9	69	−60	5	Relegation to First Division

Source: Norges Fotballforbund
Rules for classification: 1) Points; 2) Goal difference; 3) Number of goals scored; 4) Head-to-head points; 5) Head-to-head goal difference; 6) Head-to-head away goals scored
(C) Champions; (O) Play-off winners; (R) Relegated

=== Norwegian Women's Cup ===
==== Final ====
- Avaldsnes 1–0 Vålerenga

== UEFA competitions ==
=== UEFA Champions League ===
==== Qualifying phase ====
===== Second qualifying round =====
Team 1	Agg.	Team 2	1st leg	2nd leg
Dundalk (Republic of Ireland)	2–3	(Norway) Rosenborg	1–1	1–2 (a.e.t.)

===== Third qualifying round =====
Team 1	Agg.	Team 2	1st leg	2nd leg
Celtic (Scotland)	1–0	(Norway) Rosenborg	0–0	1–0

=== UEFA Europa League ===
==== Qualifying phase and play-off round ====
===== First qualifying round =====
Team 1	Agg.	Team 2	1st leg	2nd leg
Haugesund (Norway)	7–0	(Northern Ireland) Coleraine	7–0	0–0
Odd (Norway)	5–0	(Northern Ireland) Ballymena United	3–0	2–0

===== Second qualifying round =====
Team 1	Agg.	Team 2	1st leg	2nd leg
Haugesund (Norway)	3–4	(Poland) Lech Poznań	3–2	0–2
Ružomberok (Slovakia)	2–1	(Norway) Brann	0–1	2–0
Vaduz (Liechtenstein)	0–2	(Norway) Odd	0–1	0–1

===== Third qualifying round =====
Team 1	Agg.	Team 2	1st leg	2nd leg
Dinamo Zagreb (Croatia)	2–1	(Norway) Odd	2–1	0–0

===== Play-off round =====
Team 1	Agg.	Team 2	1st leg	2nd leg
Ajax (Netherlands)	2–4	(Norway) Rosenborg	0–1	2–3

==== Group stage ====
===== Group L =====
Pos	Team	Pld	W	D	L	GF	GA	GD	Pts	Qualification	ZEN	RS	ROS	VRD
1	(Russia) Zenit Saint Petersburg	6	5	1	0	17	5	+12	16	Advance to knockout phase	—	3–1	3–1	2–1
2	(Spain) Real Sociedad	6	4	0	2	16	6	+10	12	Advance to knockout phase	1–3	—	4–0	3–0
3	(Norway) Rosenborg	6	1	2	3	6	11	−5	5		1–1	0–1	—	3–1
4	(North Macedonia) Vardar	6	0	1	5	3	20	−17	1		0–5	0–6	1–1	—

Source: UEFA
Rules for classification: Group stage tiebreakers

=== UEFA Women's Champions League ===
==== Qualifying round ====
===== Group 9 =====
Pos	Team	Pld	W	D	L	GF	GA	GD	Pts	Qualification	AVA	SUB	PLJ	KIR
1	(Norway) Avaldsnes	3	3	0	0	10	3	+7	9	Round of 32	—	2–0	2–1	—
2	(Serbia) Spartak Subotica	3	2	0	1	13	3	+10	6		—	—	6–0	7–1
3	(Montenegro) Breznica Pljevlja (H)	3	0	1	2	3	10	−7	1		—	—	—	2–2
4	(Israel) Kiryat Gat	3	0	1	2	5	15	−10	1		2–6	—	—	—

Source: UEFA
(H) Hosts

==== Knockout phase ====
===== Round of 32 =====
Team 1	Agg.	Team 2	1st leg	2nd leg
Lillestrøm (Norway)	3–1	(Denmark) Brøndby	0–0	3–1
Avaldsnes (Norway)	0–6	(Spain) Barcelona	0–4	0–2

===== Round of 16 =====
Team 1	Agg.	Team 2	1st leg	2nd leg
Lillestrøm (Norway)	1–7	(England) Manchester City	0–5	1–2

== National teams ==
=== Norway men's national football team ===
==== 2018 FIFA World Cup qualification (UEFA) ====
===== Group C =====
Pos	Team	Pld	W	D	L	GF	GA	GD	Pts	Qualification	Germany		Czech Republic	Norway	Azerbaijan	San Marino
1	Germany	10	10	0	0	43	4	+39	30	Qualification to 2018 FIFA World Cup	—	2–0	3–0	6–0	5–1	7–0
2	Northern Ireland	10	6	1	3	17	6	+11	19	Advance to second round	1–3	—	2–0	2–0	4–0	4–0
3	Czech Republic	10	4	3	3	17	10	+7	15		1–2	0–0	—	2–1	0–0	5–0
4	Norway	10	4	1	5	17	16	+1	13		0–3	1–0	1–1	—	2–0	4–1
5	Azerbaijan	10	3	1	6	10	19	−9	10		1–4	0–1	1–2	1–0	—	5–1
6	San Marino	10	0	0	10	2	51	−49	0		0–8	0–3	0–6	0–8	0–1	—

Source: FIFA
Rules for classification: Qualification tiebreakers

26 March 2017 2018 FIFA World Cup Q	Northern Ireland	2–0	Norway	Belfast, Northern Ireland
20:45	Ward 2'; Washington 33'	Report (FIFA); Report (UEFA)		Stadium: Windsor Park; Attendance: 18,161; Referee: Hüseyin Göçek (Turkey)

10 June 2017 2018 FIFA World Cup Q	Norway	1–1	Czech Republic	Oslo, Norway
20:45	Søderlund 55' (pen.)	Report (UEFA)	Gebre Selassie 36'	Stadium: Ullevaal Stadion; Attendance: 12,179; Referee: Andre Marriner (England)

1 September 2017 2018 FIFA World Cup Q	Norway	2–0	Azerbaijan	Oslo, Norway
20:45	King 32'; Sadygov 60' (o.g.)	Report (UEFA)		Stadium: Ullevaal Stadion; Attendance: 8,599; Referee: Daniel Stefański (Poland)

4 September 2017 2018 FIFA World Cup Q	Germany	6–0	Norway	Stuttgart, Germany
20:45	Özil 10'; Draxler 17'; Werner 21', 40'; Goretzka 50'; Gómez 79'			Stadium: Mercedes-Benz Arena; Referee: Gediminas Mažeika (Lithuania)

5 October 2017 2018 FIFA World Cup Q	San Marino	0–8	Norway	San Marino Stadium, Serravalle
20:45 (20:45 UTC+2)		Report (UEFA)	Henriksen 8'; King 14' (pen.), 17'; Elyounoussi 39', 48', 68'; Selnæs 58'; Linnes 86'	Referee: Andrew Dallas (Scotland)

8 October 2017 2018 FIFA World Cup Q	Norway	1–0	Northern Ireland	Oslo, Norway
20:45	Brunt 71' (o.g.)	Report (UEFA)		Stadium: Ullevaal Stadion; Referee: Serhiy Boiko (Ukraine)

==== Friendlies ====
13 June 2017 Friendly	Norway	1–1	Sweden	Oslo, Norway
19:45	Elyounoussi 45'	Report (1st); Report (2nd)	Armenteros 82'	Stadium: Ullevaal Stadion; Attendance: 11,940; Referee: Daniel Stefański (Poland)

11 November 2017 Friendly	North Macedonia	2–0	Norway	Skopje, Macedonia
	Pandev 43'; Markoski 90+4'			Stadium: Philip II Arena

14 November 2017 Friendly	Slovakia	1–0	Norway	Trnava, Slovakia
	Lobotka 90+3'			Stadium: Štadión Antona Malatinského

=== Norway women's national football team ===
The following is a list of matches in 2017

==== Friendlies ====
19 January 2017 Friendly	Norway	2–1	Sweden	Murcia, Spain
	Utland 21'; Minde 26'	Summary	Jakobsson 20'	Stadium: La Manga Club; Referee: Marta Huerta de Aza

22 January 2017 Friendly	Norway	1–0	England	Murcia, Spain
	Hegerberg 26'	Report		Stadium: La Manga Club; Referee: Marta Huerta de Aza

10 April 2017 Friendly	Norway	2–1	Switzerland	Skien, Norway
	Hegerberg 8'; Minde 67'	Report	Dickemann 66'	Stadium: Skagerak Arena; Referee: Linn Andersson (Sweden)

11 June 2017 Friendly	Norway	0–1	United States	Sandefjord, Norway
13:15 ET		Report	Press 60'	Stadium: Komplett Arena; Attendance: 3,866; Referee: Amy Fearn (England)

11 July 2017 Friendly	France	1–1	Norway	Sedan, France
21:00 CET	Abily 3'		Mjelde 84'	Stadium: Stade Louis Dugauguez

==== 2017 Algarve Cup ====
===== Group B =====
Team	Pld	W	D	L	GF	GA	GD	Pts
Spain	3	2	1	0	5	1	+4	7
Japan	3	2	0	1	5	2	+3	6
Iceland	3	0	2	1	1	3	−2	2
Norway	3	0	1	2	1	6	−5	1

1 March 2017 2017 Algarve Cup	Norway	1–1	Iceland	Parchal, Portugal
	Hegerberg 4'	Report	Jónsdóttir 8'	Stadium: Bela Vista Municipal Stadium; Referee: Jonesla Kabakama (Tanzania)

3 March 2017 2017 Algarve Cup	Spain	3–0	Norway	Algarve, Portugal
	Thorisdottir 24' (o.g.); Hermoso 38'; O. García 40'	Report		Stadium: Estádio Algarve; Referee: Laura Fortunato (Argentina)

6 March 2017 2017 Algarve Cup	Norway	0–2	Japan	Algarve, Portugal
		Report	Yokoyama 59', 89'	Stadium: Estádio Algarve; Referee: Marianela Araya (Costa Rica)

===== Eleventh place match =====
8 March 2017 2017 Algarve Cup	Norway	2–0	Portugal	Portugal
	Isaksen 13'; Reiten 66'	Report		Stadium: Bela Vista Municipal Stadium, Parchal; Referee: Fatou Thioune (Senegal)

==== UEFA Women's Euro 2017 ====
===== Group A =====
Pos	Team	Pld	W	D	L	GF	GA	GD	Pts	Qualification
1	Netherlands (H)	3	3	0	0	4	1	+3	9	Knockout stage
2	Denmark	3	2	0	1	2	1	+1	6	Knockout stage
3	Belgium	3	1	0	2	3	3	0	3	
4	Norway	3	0	0	3	0	4	−4	0	

Source: UEFA
Rules for classification: Group stage tiebreakers
(H) Hosts

16 July 2017 UEFA Women's Euro – GS	Netherlands	1–0	Norway	Utrecht, Netherlands
	van de Sanden 66'	Report		Stadium: Stadion Galgenwaard; Attendance: 21,732; Referee: Stéphanie Frappart (France)

20 July 2017 UEFA Women's Euro – GS	Norway	0–2	Belgium	Breda, Netherlands
		Report	Van Gorp 59'; Cayman 67'	Stadium: Rat Verlegh Stadion; Attendance: 8,477; Referee: Monika Mularczyk (Poland)

24 July 2017 UEFA Women's Euro – GS	Norway	0–1	Denmark	Deventer, Netherlands
		Report	Veje 5'	Stadium: De Adelaarshorst; Referee: Stéphanie Frappart (France)
