= Oyedele =

- Language: Yoruba

Origin
- Origin: Nigeria
- Meaning: "Honor has come home" or "Title has come home"
- Region of origin: South-west Nigeria

Oyedele is a Yoruba name that translates to "Honor has come home" or "Title has come home." It signifies an individual who holds a distinguished title, symbolizing courage, dignity, and strength. The name is often shortened to Oye, which means "honor" or "title."

== Notable people with the name ==
- Abdullahi Adekunle Oyedele (born 15 July 1999), Nigerian footballer
- Ade Shola Oyedele (born 14 September 1984), Nigerian former footballer
- Emmanuel Oyedele Oluwaseun Opeoluwa Akan Oyeleke (born 24 December 1992), English footballer
- Maximillian Oyedele (born 7 November 2004), footballer
- Noimot Salako-Oyedele (born 8 January 1966), Nigerian politician, public health engineer, and real estate professional
- Taiwo Oyedele (born 18 June 1975), Nigerian economist and accountant
