= 2019 Eliteserien promotion/relegation play-offs =

Norwegian football competition

The 2019 Eliteserien promotion/relegation play-offs was the 46th time a spot in the Eliteserien was decided by play-off matches between top tier and second level clubs. In the play-offs, five teams competed for one spot in the 2020 Eliteserien.

At the end of the 2019 season, Tromsø and Ranheim were relegated directly to 2020 1. divisjon, and were replaced by Aalesund and Sandefjord who were directly promoted.

== Format change ==
The 2019 season was marked by a change to the format of the qualification rounds for the 1. divisjon teams. In previous seasons, the first two knockout-rounds began with the four teams in the 1. divisjon playing single-legged rounds with home advantage for the best placed team: 3rd v 6th and 4th v 5th, and the winner then played each other to determine who would meet the Eliteserien club in the final. Following these changes, the first round would be played 5th v 6th, and the winner would advance to play away to 4th in the second round. The winner of the second round would advance to play away to 3rd in the third round. The winner of the third round would meet the 14th placed team in Eliteserien in a two-legged final.

== Background ==
The play-offs between Eliteserien and 1. divisjon have been held every year since 1972 with exceptions in 1994 and 2011. They take place for the two divisions following the conclusion of the regular season and are contested by the fourteenth-placed club in Eliteserien and the four clubs finishing below the automatic promotion places in the 1. divisjon. The fixtures are determined by final league position – the first round will be played 5th v 6th, and the winner will advance to play away to 4th in the second round. The winner of the second round will advance to play away to 3rd in the third round. The winner of the third round will meet the 14th placed team in Eliteserien in a two-legged final.

== Qualified teams ==
Five teams entered a play-off for the last Eliteserien spot for the 2020 season. These were:

- Lillestrøm (14th placed team in Eliteserien)
- Start (third placed team in the 1. divisjon)
- KFUM Oslo (fourth placed team in the 1. divisjon)
- Kongsvinger (fifth placed team in the 1. divisjon)
- Sogndal (sixth placed team in the 1. divisjon)

=== Matches ===
The third to sixth-placed teams take part in the promotion play-offs; these are single leg knockout matches, three rounds involving 1. divisjon teams and a final between the winner of these rounds and the fourteenth-placed team in Eliteserien.

Final league position – 1. divisjon
Pos	Team	Pld	W	D	L	GF	GA	GD	Pts
3	Start	30	19	5	6	54	31	+23	62
4	KFUM	30	13	9	8	58	42	+16	48
5	Kongsvinger	30	14	4	12	37	36	+1	46
6	Sogndal	30	13	6	11	51	38	+13	45

==== First round ====
23 November 2019
18:00 CET (UTC+1)

Kongsvinger	1–0	Sogndal
Skagestad 17'	Report

Gjemselund Stadion, Kongsvinger
Attendance: 1,433
Referee: Ola Hobber Nilsen (Nordstrand)

==== Second round ====
27 November 2019
18:30 CET (UTC+1)

KFUM Oslo	2–0	Kongsvinger
Brix 24'; Larsen 74'	Report

Intility Arena, Oslo
Attendance: 1,311
Referee: Kristoffer Hagenes (Hovding)

==== Third round ====
1 December 2019
15:00 CET (UTC+1)

Start	1–0	KFUM Oslo
Lowe 32'	Report

Sør Arena, Kristiansand
Attendance: 2,615
Referee: Rohit Saggi (Drafn)

==== Final ====
The 14th-placed team in Eliteserien, Lillestrøm, will play a two-legged play-off against Start, the winners of the 1. divisjon promotion play-offs, to decide who will play in the 2020 Eliteserien.

7 December 2019
18:00 CET (UTC+1)

Start	2–1	Lillestrøm
Sigurðarson 54' (pen.), 69'	Report	Gustavsson 28'

Sør Arena, Kristiansand
Attendance: 4,013
Referee: Trygve Kjensli (Nesodden)
11 December 2019
19:00 CET (UTC+1)

Lillestrøm	4–3	Start
Mikalsen 2'; Lowe 22' (o.g.); Gustavsson 49'; Melgalvis 61'	Report	Ramsland 76', 79', 82'

Åråsen Stadion, Lillestrøm
Attendance: 7,892
Referee: Ola Hobber Nilsen (Nordstrand)

The tie ended with a 5–5 draw on aggregate, Start won on the away goals rule and retained promoted to Eliteserien.

== Bracket ==
First round
5	Kongsvinger	1
6	Sogndal	0

Second round
4	KFUM Oslo	2
5	Kongsvinger	0

Third round
3	Start	1
4	KFUM Oslo	0

Final round
3	Start (a)	2	3	5
14	Lillestrøm	1	4	5
