= Erik Ruthford Pedersen =

Norwegian footballer (born 1946)

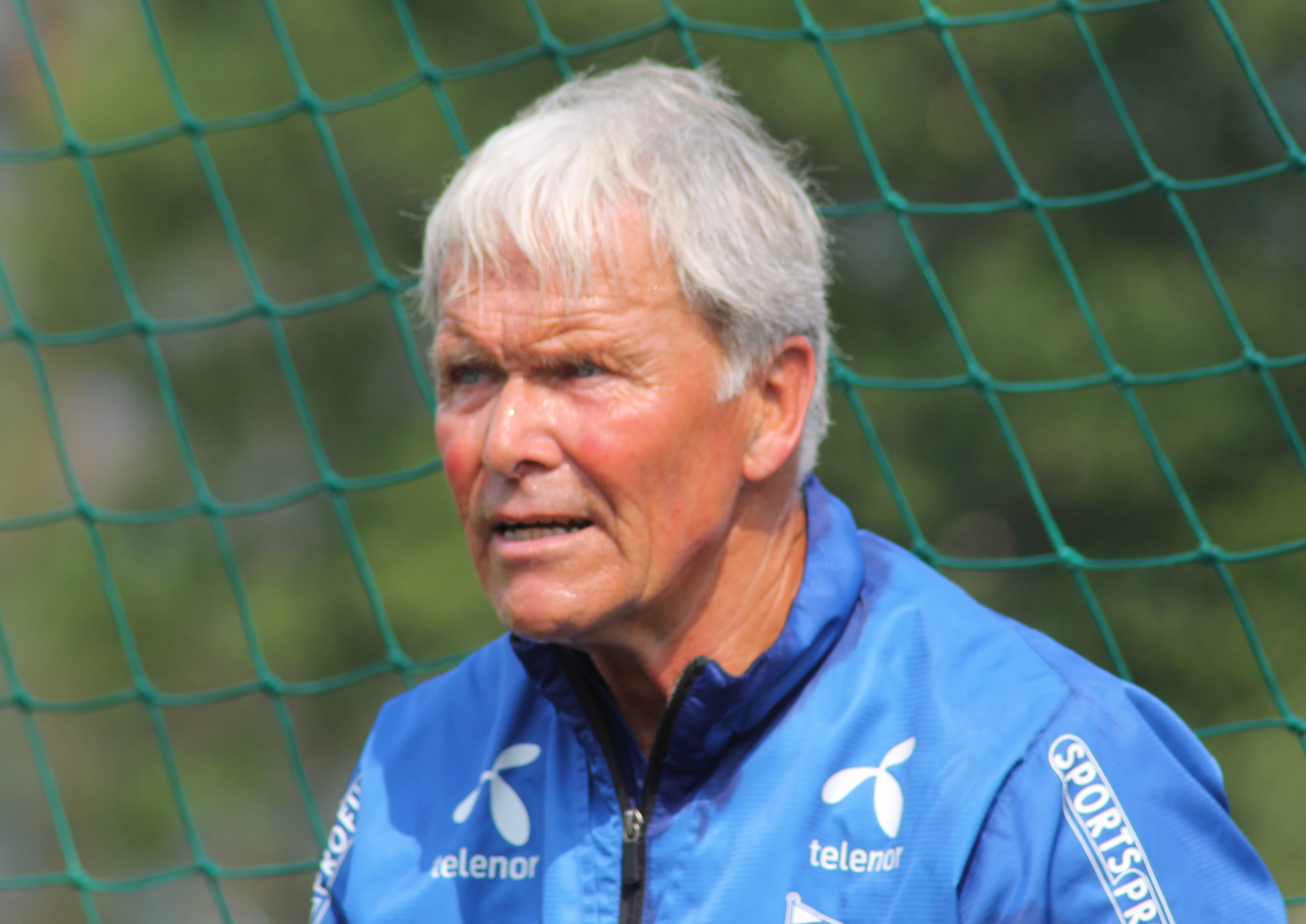

Personal information
- Date of birth: 14 February 1946 (age 80)

Senior career*
Years	Team	Apps	(Gls)
- Start

Managerial career
- 1977–1978: Vindbjart
- 1978–1978: Vigør
- 1979–1980: Bodø/Glimt
- 1981: Start (assistant)
- 1982–1984: Start
- 1985–1989: Start (youth)
- 1991–1995: Start (assistant)
- 1995: Start
- 2007–2017: Start (goalkeeping coach)
- 2010–2017: Vindbjart (goalkeeping coach)
- 2018–: Vigør (goalkeeping coach)
- 2019: Arendal (goalkeeping coach)
- * Club domestic league appearances and goals

Erik Ruthford Pedersen (born 14 February 1946) is a Norwegian former football manager.

A player with a modest career in Start, he started his managing career in local clubs Vindbjart and Vigør before being hired by Bodø/Glimt. After two seasons he returned to Start, first as assistant manager, then as manager from 1982 to 1984. After long periods as youth coach and assistant manager, he again became manager in 1995. From 2007 through 2017 he was their goalkeeper coach. He was the father of players Kjetil Ruthford Pedersen and Steinar Pedersen, and after Steinar Pedersen was sacked as manager by Start's new director of sports Tor-Kristian Karlsen in 2017, Pedersen quit Start. He was regarded as a club legend and a person who "was Start". He instead became goalkeeper coach of Vigør, and of Arendal when his son Steinar Pedersen was managed there.
