= Thomas Zenke =

Nigerian footballer

Personal information
- Date of birth: 30 January 1993 (age 33)
- Height: 1.78 m (5 ft 10 in)
- Position: Winger

Team information
- Current team: Enyimba

Senior career*
Years	Team	Apps	(Gls)
2012–2013	ABS		
2014	Enyimba		
2015–2019	Nasarawa United		
2019–	Enyimba		

International career^{‡}
2017	Nigeria	1	(0)
- * Club domestic league appearances and goals as of 09:47, 1 March 2018 (UTC) ‡ National team caps and goals as of 09:47, 1 March 2018 (UTC)

Thomas Zenke (born 30 January 1993) is a Nigerian footballer who plays for Enyimba, as a winger. He made one appearance for the Nigeria national team.

== Club career ==
Zenke has played club football for ABS, Enyimba and Nasarawa United.

In January 2016, Zenke travelled to Malta for negotiations with Mosta FC. But he was left disappointed after learning what he will be earning which was far less than what he was told when he agreed to travel to Malta. He then travelled back to Nigeria and continued playing for Nasarawa United.

Zenke rejoined Enyimba in January 2019.

== International career ==
Zenke made his international debut for Nigeria in 2017.

== Personal life ==
His older brother Simon is also a footballer.
