= Pascal Chimdindu Anorue =

Nigerian footballer

Personal information
- Full name: Pascal Chimdindu Anorue
- Date of birth: 8 October 1994 (age 32)
- Place of birth: Asaba, Nigeria
- Height: 1.83 m (6 ft 0 in)
- Position: Winger

Senior career*
Years	Team	Apps	(Gls)
2010-2011	Delta Force Feeders FC	12	(4)
2011-2013	AGNS FC	18	(8)
2013-2017	ABS FC	24	(7)
2019-2020	Fatai Dragons FC	28	(9)
2020	Ankara Metropol SK	13	(6)
2020	Ankara 1910 SK	10	(5)
- * Club domestic league appearances and goals

Pascal Chimdindu Anorue (born 8 October 1994) is a Nigerian footballer who most recently played for Ankara 1910 SK in Turkey, where he played as a winger.

== Early career ==
Chimdindu Anorue began his career with Delta Force Feeders FC and later joined AGNS FC. In 2013, he joined ABS FC, making his debut in the Nigeria Premier League. In December 2017, he was loaned to Fatai Dragons FC.

== Senior career ==
In January 2020, Anorue joined Ankara Metropol SK and subsequently had a brief loan spell at Ankara 1910 SK in April 2020.
