= Kjetil Ruthford Pedersen =

Norwegian footballer (born 1973)

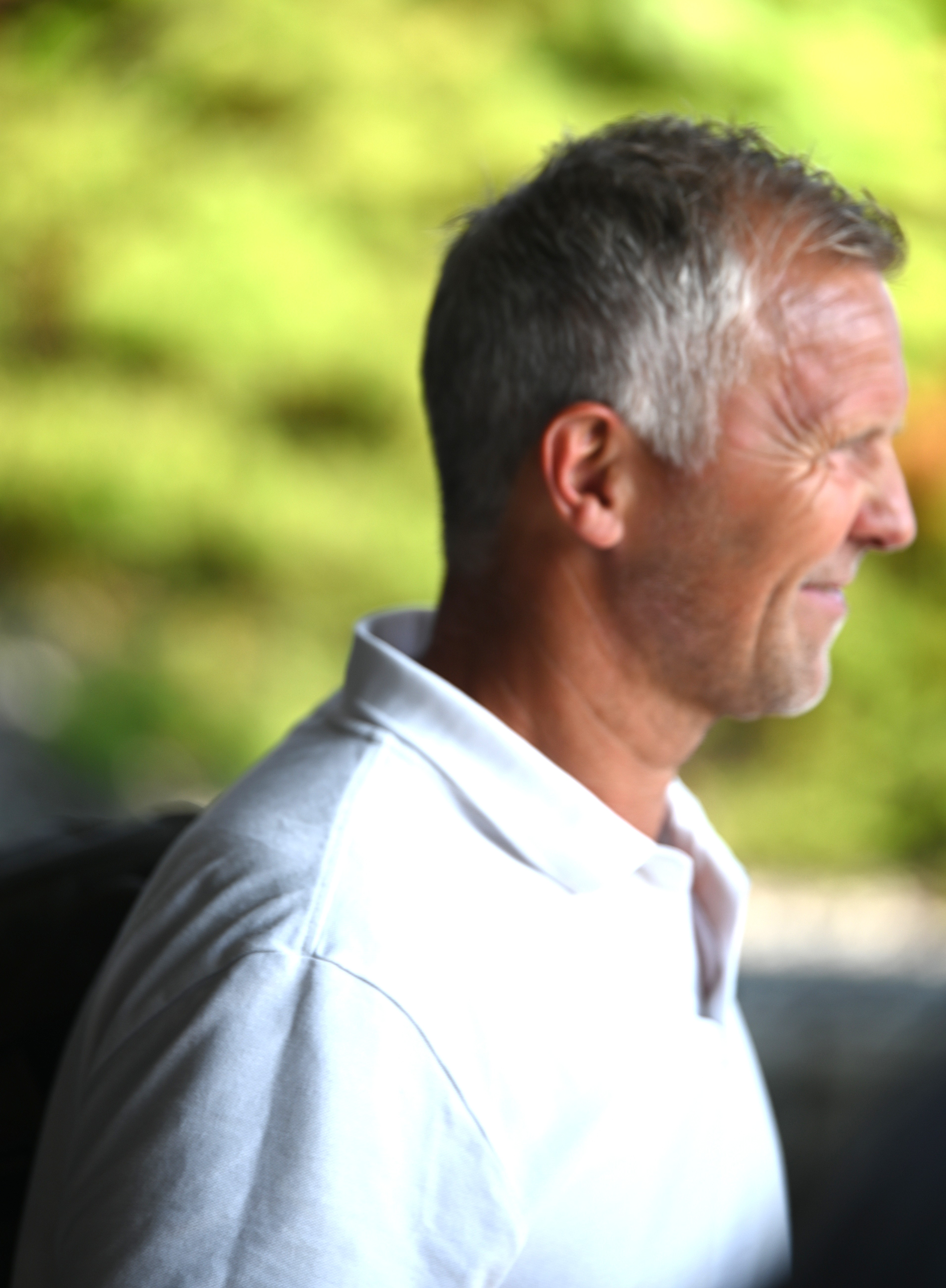
Kjetil Ruthford Pedersen in 2026

Kjetil Ruthford Pedersen (born 22 May 1973) is a Norwegian retired footballer and later manager. He has played for FK Vigør, Odd Grenland, Molde FK, Skeid, IF Elfsborg, LASK Linz, Esbjerg fB, Sogndal, IK Start and FK Mandalskameratene.

He is the son of Erik Ruthford Pedersen and brother of Steinar Pedersen. As a manager, Kjetil Ruthford Pedersen signed his nephew Emil Grønn Pedersen.
