= Simon Zenke =

Nigerian footballer

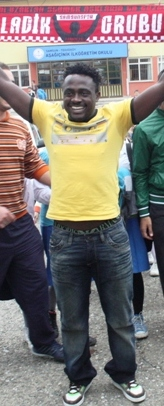
- Zenke with Samsunspor in September 2010

Personal information
- Full name: Simon Terwase Zenke
- Date of birth: 24 December 1988 (age 37)
- Place of birth: Kaduna, Nigeria
- Height: 1.77 m (5 ft 10 in)
- Position: Forward

Youth career
- Kaduna United

Senior career*
Years	Team	Apps	(Gls)
2005	Niger Tornadoes		
2005–2010	Strasbourg B	59	(11)
2007–2010	Strasbourg	37	(3)
2010–2012	Samsunspor	53	(17)
2012–2013	Nancy	11	(1)
2013–2014	İstanbul BB	19	(2)
2014–2015	Şanlıurfaspor	22	(3)
2015–2016	Karabükspor	29	(3)
2016–2018	Tubize	50	(5)
2018–2019	Dinamo București	22	(1)
2020-2021	Schiltigheim	4	(0)
2021	Menemen	7	(2)
2022-2023	Illkirch Graffenstaden	19	(2)
- * Club domestic league appearances and goals

Simon Terwase Zenke (born 24 December 1988) is a Nigerian former professional footballer who played as a forward.

== Career ==
Zenke began his career in his hometown Kaduna with Kaduna United before joining RC Strasbourg in 2008.

In November 2018, he signed a contract with Romanian first division club Dinamo București. He left the club in June 2019. At the end of January 2020, Zenke then moved to French Championnat National 2 club SC Schiltigheim.

In May 2020, Zenke confirmed on social medias, that his agent was negotiating with clubs from India. The club was reportedly Hyderabad FC. However, nothing came out of it.

== Personal life ==
His younger brother Thomas is also a footballer.
