= Jan Tore Amundsen =

Norwegian footballer (born 1983)

Personal information
- Full name: Jan Tore Thorsø Amundsen
- Date of birth: 12 April 1983 (age 43)
- Place of birth: Kongsvinger, Norway
- Height: 1.70 m (5 ft 7 in)
- Position: Midfielder

Youth career
- Urædd

Senior career*
Years	Team	Apps	(Gls)
2002–2008	Odd Grenland	90	(1)
2009	Notodden	16	(1)
2010	FK Tønsberg	11	(1)
2012	Notodden	24	(1)
2013–2014	Strømmen	22	(0)
2015–2018	Ullensaker/Kisa	57	(1)

International career
2002	Norway U19	1	(0)
2005	Norway U21	2	(1)
- * Club domestic league appearances and goals

Jan Tore Amundsen (born 12 April 1983 in Kongsvinger) is a Norwegian footballer who most recently played for Ullensaker/Kisa IL.

== Club career ==
Jan Tore Amundsen came to Odd Grenland from Urædd before the 2002 season.

In April 2005 he got his first match for Norway national under-21 football team against Slovakia. In his second match he scored a goal against Belarus after only 6 minutes

His only goal for the team came when he scored against Vålerenga Fotball in 2006.

In 2007, Amundsen got voted the third worst player in Tippeligaen by several Norwegian online newspapers, the worst player and second worst player was Odd Grenland teammates Fernando de Ornelas and Zbyněk Pospěch.

In February 2009, Jan Tore Amundsen signed a contract with Notodden FK and signed than on 16. December 2009 for FK Tønsberg.

After the 2018 season, Amundsen left Ullensaker/Kisa.
