= Marko Marić (footballer, born 1996) =

Croatian footballer (born 1996)

Personal information
- Date of birth: 3 January 1996 (age 30)
- Place of birth: Vienna, Austria
- Height: 1.93 m (6 ft 4 in)
- Position: Goalkeeper

Team information
- Current team: RFS
- Number: 35

Youth career
- 2002–2004: Post SV Wien
- 2004–2013: Rapid Wien

Senior career*
Years	Team	Apps	(Gls)
2011–2015	Rapid Wien II	26	(0)
2013–2015	Rapid Wien	8	(0)
2015–2020	1899 Hoffenheim	0	(0)
2015–2016	→ Lechia Gdańsk (loan)	24	(0)
2017	→ Hannover 96 (loan)	0	(0)
2017	→ Hannover 96 II (loan)	13	(0)
2017–2019	→ Lillestrøm (loan)	56	(0)
2020–2021	Houston Dynamo	45	(0)
2022–2023	Atromitos	3	(0)
2023–2025	Zrinjski Mostar	61	(0)
2025–	RFS	19	(0)

International career
2011	Austria U16	1	(0)
2012	Croatia U16	8	(0)
2012–2013	Croatia U17	13	(0)
2013	Croatia U18	3	(0)
2014–2015	Croatia U19	5	(0)
- * Club domestic league appearances and goals as of 14 June 2026

Marko Marić (Croatian pronunciation: [mâːrko mǎːritɕ]; born 3 January 1996) is a professional footballer who plays as a goalkeeper for Latvian Higher League club RFS. Born in Austria, he has represented his country of birth and Croatia internationally at youth level.

== Club career ==
=== Rapid Wien ===
Marić began his career in for Post SV Wien in 2002. In 2004, at the age of eight, he joined the Rapid Wien youth ranks. Marić was promoted to Rapid Wien II for the 2011–12 season. He made his professional debut on 4 May 2012, getting the start for Rapid Wien II in a 4–0 win over SV Mattersburg II in Regionalliga Ost match He made the match day squad 12 other times that season. The 2012–13 season saw Marić make nine appearances for Rapid Wien II. He also made the match day squad for the Rapid Wien first team three times during the season, but did not appear in a match.

On 11 May 2014, Marić made his first team debut in a 5–2 win over SV Ried in the final Austrian Bundesliga match of the season. He also made 7 appearances with Rapid Wien II during the season.

He made his first appearance of the 2014–15 season on 14 February 2015, a 3–0 win over SV Ried. Marić served primarily as the second choice goalkeeper for the season, making 7 league appearances and one in the Austrian Cup while making the bench for 21 other times. He also made 9 appearances for the second team during the season.

On 19 June 2015, it was announced that Marić would be leaving Rapid Wien after he was unwilling to sign a contract extension.

=== Lechia Gdańsk ===
Marić signed with German Bundesliga club TSG 1899 Hoffenheim on 30 June 2015. He was immediately loaned to Polish Ekstraklasa club Lechia Gdańsk for the 2015–16 season. On 17 July 2015, he made his debut for Lechia in a 1–0 defeat to KS Cracovia in the opening match of the Ekstraklasa season. He started the first 23 league games of the year for Lechia before losing the starting job to Vanja Milinković-Savić. Marić made 24 league appearances and one appearance in the Polish Cup for Lechia, keeping 7 clean sheets.

=== Hannover 96 ===
On 31 January 2017, Marić was sent on loan to Hannover 96, who were playing in the 2. Bundesliga. He did not make any appearances with the Hannover first team, rather spending time with Hannover 96 II in the Regionalliga Nord. Marić made his first appearance for Hannover 96 II on 11 February in a 2–1 loss to SV Eichede. He made 13 appearances with Hannover 96 II during the loan.

=== Lillestrøm SK ===
On 1 August 2017, he went on loan to Norwegian Eliteserien club Lillestrøm SK until the end of the 2017 season. Marić made his debut for LSK on 24 August 2017, a 3–0 loss to Rosenborg BK.

On 24 November 2017, Marić's loan was extended until 2019.

Marić made his first appearance of the 2018 season on 11 March 2018, getting the start in a 3–1 defeat to Bodø/Glimt in the opening match of the season. He made 25 appearances in the Eliteserien as he helped LSK finish in 12th place, three points above the relegation zone. Marić also made five appearances in the Norwegian Cup to help LSK reach the semifinals, where they lost 3–0 to Strømsgodset.

On 1 April 2019, Marić made his first appearance of the 2019 season in a 1–1 draw with Stabæk in matchweek 1. He made 30 starts in the Eliteserien as Lillestrøm finished in 14th place, sending them to the relegation playoffs. Marić played both legs of the playoff matchup with IK Start. LSK won the first leg 2–1, but lost the return leg 4–3, being relegated on away goals. Marić started 34 of the 35 matches for LSK in the 2019 season, the only one he failed to appear in being a Norwegian Cup first round matchup with Gjelleråsen IF

=== Houston Dynamo ===
On 13 January 2020, Marić signed with Major League Soccer side Houston Dynamo. On 29 February 2020 Marić made his Dynamo debut in a 1–1 draw against LA Galaxy. He recorded his first clean sheet for the Dynamo on 21 August in a 0–0 draw with Texas Derby rivals FC Dallas. In a shortened season due to the COVID-19 pandemic Marić played in 23 games and had three clean sheets, playing every minute of the season for Houston. The season was a disappointment for Houston, finishing last in the Western Conference and missing out on the playoffs.

Marić started the first 21 games of the 2021 season for the Dynamo. During that stretch, he was named to the MLS Team of the Week for week ten after making seven saves in a 1–1 draw against Real Salt Lake on 26 June. Marić missed the next ten games due to a left leg injury. On 24 October, he returned from his injury in a 2–1 loss to Austin FC. Marić was credited with an own goal in the game after Cecilio Dominguez's penalty kick bounced off of the post, off of Marić's back, and into the net. Marić did not appear in Houston's final two games of the season. He ended the season with 22 appearances and three clean sheets during another disappointing season for the Dynamo, finishing last in the Western Conference for the second consecutive season and failing to qualify for the playoffs.

Following the 2021 season, Marić's contract option was declined by Houston.

=== Atromitos ===
On 31 January 2022, he joined Atromitos on a free transfer, signing a contract until the summer of 2023.

== International career ==
Marić played for the Austria U-16 team in a friendly in 2011. In 2012, Marić decided to represent Croatia and filed a one-time switch with FIFA. He would represent Croatia at the U-16, U-17, U-18, and U-19 levels, making 29 appearances for the various Croatian youth national teams. Marić made 3 appearances for Croatia at the 2013 FIFA U-17 World Cup.

== Personal life ==
Marić was born and raised in Vienna, Austria to two Croatian parents. He and his family are Catholics.

== Career statistics ==
As of matches played 10 November 2021

Appearances and goals by club, season and competition
Club	Season	League			National cup (Note: Includes Austrian Cup, Polish Cup, Norwegian Cup)		Continental		Other		Total	
Club	Season	Division	Apps	Goals	Apps	Goals	Apps	Goals	Apps	Goals	Apps	Goals
Rapid Wien II	2011-12	Regionalliga Ost	1	0	—		—		—		1	0
Rapid Wien II	2012–13	Regionalliga Ost	9	0	—		—		—		9	0
Rapid Wien II	2013–14	Regionalliga Ost	7	0	—		—		—		7	0
Rapid Wien II	2014–15	Regionalliga Ost	9	0	—		—		—		9	0
Rapid Wien II	Total		26	0	0	0	0	0	0	0	26	0
Rapid Wien	2013–14	Austrian Bundesliga	1	0	0	0	0	0	—		1	0
Rapid Wien	2014–15	Austrian Bundesliga	7	0	1	0	0	0	—		8	0
Rapid Wien	Total		8	0	1	0	0	0	0	0	9	0
1899 Hoffenheim	2015–16	Bundesliga	0	0	0	0	—		—		0	0
Lechia Gdańsk (loan)	2015–16	Ekstraklasa	24	0	1	0	—		—		25	0
Hannover 96 II (loan)	2016–17	Regionalliga Nord	13	0	—		—		—		13	0
Lillestrøm (loan)	2017	Eliteserien	1	0	0	0	—		—		1	0
Lillestrøm (loan)	2018	Eliteserien	25	0	5	0	1 (Note: Appearances in UEFA Europa League)	0	1 (Note: Appearances in Mesterfinalen)	0	32	0
Lillestrøm (loan)	2019	Eliteserien	30	0	2	0	—		2 (Note: Appearances in Eliteserien relegation play-offs)	0	34	0
Lillestrøm (loan)	Total		56	0	7	0	1	0	3	0	67	0
Houston Dynamo	2020	Major League Soccer	23	0	—		—		—		23	0
Houston Dynamo	2021	Major League Soccer	22	0	—		—		—		22	
Houston Dynamo	Total		45	0	0	0	0	0	0	0	45	0
Career total			172	0	9	0	1	0	3	0	185	0

== Honours ==
Lillestrøm SK

- Norwegian Cup: 2017

Zrinjski Mostar

- Bosnian Premier League: 2022–23, 2024–25
- Bosnian Cup: 2022–23, 2023–24

RFS

- Latvian Higher League: 2026
