= Arnold Origi =

Kenyan footballer (born 1983)

Personal information
- Full name: Arnold Otieno Origi
- Date of birth: 15 November 1983 (age 42)
- Place of birth: Nairobi, Kenya
- Height: 1.86 m (6 ft 1 in)
- Position: Goalkeeper

Team information
- Current team: Östersund (player-goalkeeping coach)
- Number: 77

Senior career*
| Years | Team | Apps | (Gls) |
| 2001–2006 | Mathare United | 110 | (0) |
| 2006 | Tusker | 52 | (0) |
| 2007–2011 | Moss | 80 | (0) |
| 2011 | → Fredrikstad (loan) | 2 | (0) |
| 2012 | Ull/Kisa | 29 | (0) |
| 2013–2017 | Lillestrøm | 150 | (0) |
| 2018 | Sandnes Ulf | 11 | (0) |
| 2018 | Kongsvinger | 7 | (0) |
| 2019–2021 | HIFK | 33 | (0) |
| 2021 | Hødd | 21 | (0) |
| 2023– | Östersund | 11 | (0) |

International career
| 2005–2021 | Kenya | 48 | (0) |

Managerial career
- 2023–: Östersund (goalkeeping coach)
- * Club domestic league appearances and goals as of 16 November 2025

Arnold Otieno Origi (born 15 November 1983) is a Kenyan professional footballer who played as a goalkeeper and current goalkeeper coach of Östersund.

He was one of the most successful keepers in Kenya, and the only Kenyan goalkeeper to play in Europe for more than 15 years.

== Career ==
=== Club ===
Origi played for Mathare United and Tusker in his home country before joining Moss, where fellow Kenyan John Muiruri was already playing. After a short loan spell with Fredrikstad, and a brief stop at Ull/Kisa he joined Lillestrøm in 2013.

In January 2018, Origi was taken on trial by Premier League club Crystal Palace, but failed to gain a contract. As a consequence of Origi's trial at the British club, Lillestrøm had already found a replacement for him, Matvei Igonen. Therefore, Origi and the club mutually agreed to terminate his contract so he could still find a new club after the transfer window closed.

After signing with Kongsvinger in September 2018, he left the club again at the end of the year.

=== International ===
Origi has played 45 international matches for Kenya (as of February 6, 2018).

On 23 August 2017, it was announced that Origi acquired Norwegian citizenship.

== Personal life ==
Origi comes from a football family. His uncle Mike Origi was a professional footballer in Belgium. His father, Austin Oduor Origi, was a long term captain of Kenyan Premier League side Gor Mahia, and his other uncles Gerald and Anthony were defenders at Tusker. His cousin Divock was also a former footballer who played for English Premier League side Liverpool, as well as the Belgium national team.

== Career statistics ==
=== Club ===
As of match played 7 October 2018

| Season | Club | Division | League | | Cup | | Total | |
| Season | Club | Division | Apps | Goals | Apps | Goals | Apps | Goals |
|---|---|---|---|---|---|---|---|---|
| 2007 | Moss | Adeccoligaen | 24 | 0 | 1 | 0 | 25 | 0 |
| 2008 | Moss | Adeccoligaen | 8 | 0 | 0 | 0 | 8 | 0 |
| 2009 | Moss | Adeccoligaen | 8 | 0 | 0 | 0 | 8 | 0 |
| 2010 | Moss | Adeccoligaen | 19 | 0 | 0 | 0 | 19 | 0 |
| 2011 | Moss | 2. divisjon | 15 | 0 | 0 | 0 | 15 | 0 |
| 2011 | Fredrikstad | Tippeligaen | 2 | 0 | 0 | 0 | 2 | 0 |
| 2012 | Ull/Kisa | Adeccoligaen | 29 | 0 | 3 | 0 | 32 | 0 |
| 2013 | Lillestrøm | Tippeligaen | 10 | 0 | 3 | 0 | 13 | 0 |
| 2014 | Lillestrøm | Tippeligaen | 30 | 0 | 3 | 0 | 33 | 0 |
| 2015 | Lillestrøm | Tippeligaen | 30 | 0 | 2 | 0 | 32 | 0 |
| 2016 | Lillestrøm | Tippeligaen | 23 | 0 | 2 | 0 | 25 | 0 |
| 2017 | Lillestrøm | Eliteserien | 26 | 0 | 6 | 0 | 32 | 0 |
| 2018 | Sandnes Ulf | OBOS-ligaen | 11 | 0 | 3 | 0 | 14 | 0 |
| 2018 | Kongsvinger | OBOS-ligaen | 4 | 0 | 0 | 0 | 4 | 0 |
| 2019 | HIFK | Veikkausliiga | 12 | 0 | 0 | 0 | 12 | 0 |
| 2020 | HIFK | Veikkausliiga | 21 | 0 | 4 | 0 | 25 | 0 |
| 2021 | Hødd | PostNord-ligaen | 21 | 0 | 1 | 0 | 22 | 0 |
| 2023 | Östersund | Superettan | 1 | 0 | 1 | 0 | 2 | 0 |
| Career Total | | | 294 | 0 | 29 | 0 | 323 | 0 |

=== International ===
Kenya
| Year | Apps | Goals |
|---|---|---|
| 2005 | 8 | 0 |
| 2006 | 4 | 0 |
| 2007 | 8 | 0 |
| 2008 | 6 | 0 |
| 2009 | 4 | 0 |
| 2010 | 0 | 0 |
| 2011 | 7 | 0 |
| 2012 | 3 | 0 |
| 2013 | 3 | 0 |
| 2014 | 2 | 0 |
| 2015 | 1 | 0 |
| 2021 | 2 | 0 |
| Total | 48 | 0 |

Statistics accurate as of match played 6 September 2015

== Honors ==
Lillestrøm Sk

Norwegian Cup:

- Winners: 2017

Individual

- Lillestrøm SK player of the Year: 2015
