= Paul Obiefule =

Nigerian footballer (born 1986)

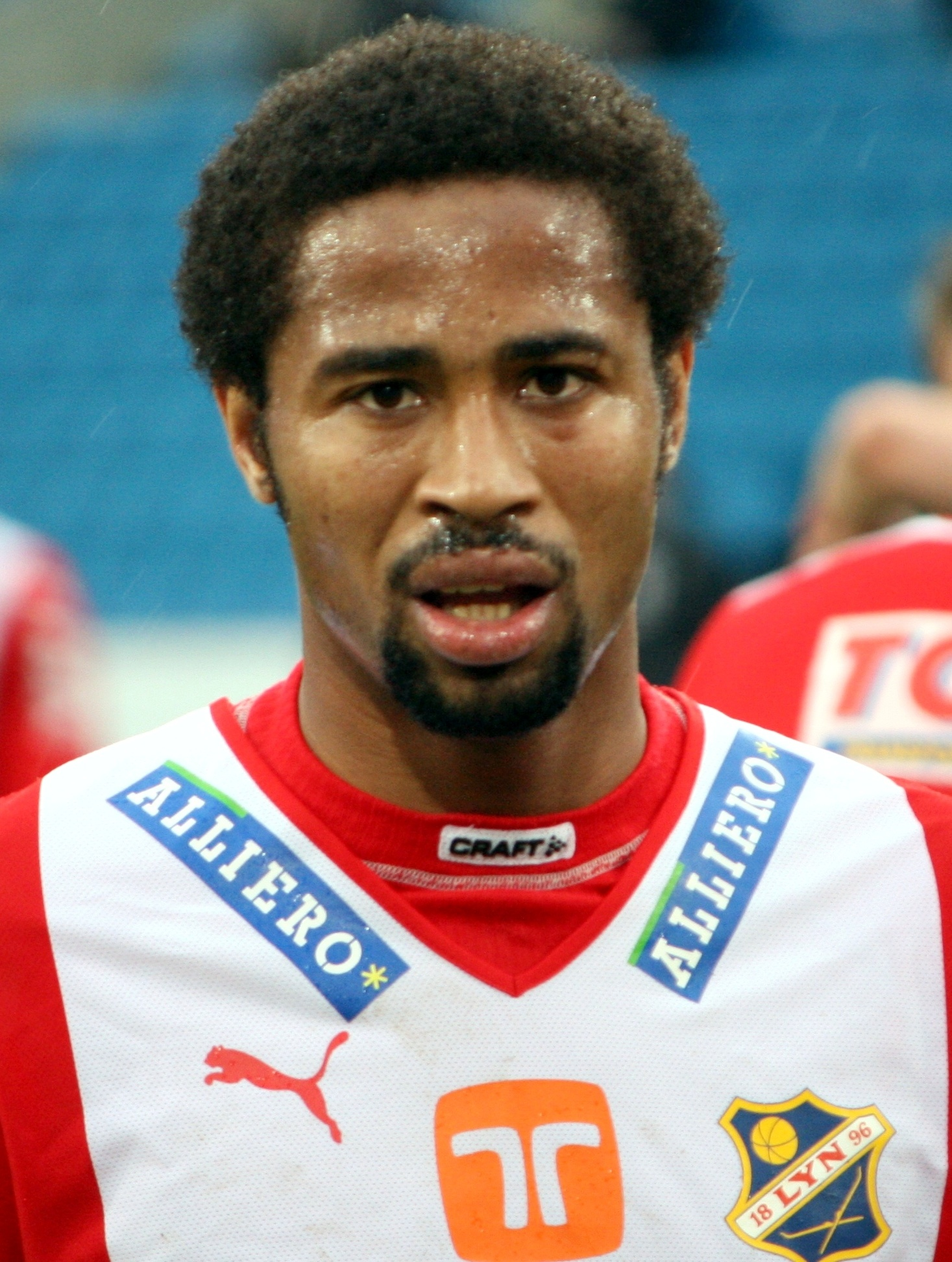
- Obiefule with Lyn

Personal information
- Full name: Paul Ikechukwu Obiefule
- Date of birth: 15 May 1986 (age 40)
- Place of birth: Owerri, Nigeria
- Height: 1.84 m (6 ft 0 in)
- Position: Midfielder

Youth career
- Planners FC

Senior career*
Years	Team	Apps	(Gls)
2000–2004	Heartland	?	(?)
2004–2007	Viborg FF	40	(0)
2007–2009	Lyn	52	(3)
2010–2011	Hønefoss	35	(4)
2011	→ Lillestrøm (loan)	12	(0)
2012–2013	KuPS	27	(2)
2013–2014	Assyriska FF	26	(2)
2014–2015	Møldrup/Tostrup		
2015–2017	Holstebro		

International career
2004–2007	Nigeria	14	(0)
- * Club domestic league appearances and goals

Paul Ikechukwu Obiefule // (born 15 May 1986) is a Nigerian former professional footballer who played as a midfielder.

== Club career ==
Obiefule was born in Owerri. He began his career in his home country of Nigeria playing for Planners FC and then Heartland, where he spent two months before being spotted by Danish side Viborg FF, who signed him in 2004. During his time at Viborg he attracted much interest from many overseas clubs but in 2007 it was announced that he had signed a one-year deal for the Norwegian club Lyn. In September 2008 signed a new contract, lasting until the end of 2011 and he was appointed captain making him the first black to captain a Norwegian Premiership Club. Obiefule was a transfer target for English Championship side Watford, Scottish Aberdeen and Norwegian Hønefoss. Obiefule verbally agreed on 14 December 2009 for a three-year contract with Hønefoss because of a knee injury that jeopardised his moves to either Scotland or England. Obiefule agreed on six months loan for Lillestrøm on 2 August 2011 and was drafted into the game against Tromsø the next day, 3 August, without training with his new teammate. In February 2012 Obiefule signed a contract for the 2012 season with Finnish Veikkausliiga team KuPS.

In November 2012, Obiefule was back training with Viborg FF ahead of a proposed move to an unknown Chinese team.

In August 2015, Obiefule agreed for a contract with Danish club Holstebro, after playing for Møldrup/Tostrup. He retired in 2017.

== International career ==
Obiefule was called up to the Nigerian national team in 2004, beginning his international career at the LG Cup, a four-nation tournament held that year. On 28 April 2004, he featured in the semi-final against Jordan, helping Nigeria secure a 2–0 victory. He later appeared in a 2006 FIFA World Cup African qualification match against Angola on 20 June, in which Nigeria suffered a 1–0 defeat.

In 2006, Obiefule was included in Nigeria's squad for the 2006 Africa Cup of Nations, held in Egypt. Nigeria won all three of their group-stage matches to advance to the quarter-finals, where they defeated Tunisia on penalties to reach the semi-finals. However, they lost to the Ivory Coast in the semi-finals before defeating the Senegal 1–0 in the third-place match to finish third in the tournament.

== Personal life ==
Obiefule was studying agricultural economics at the Federal University of Technology Owerri in Nigeria but gave it up to pursue a professional football career.

His younger brother Polycarp Obinna Obiefule, plays currently for Mosta F.C. in Malta. His brother Pol broke a record as the highest goal ever scored in Maltese Premier League in the 2011/2012 Season with 34 Goals. Formerly member of Planners F.C. Owerri Imo State Nigeria.

== Career statistics ==
Appearances and goals by club, season and competition
Season	Club	League			Cup		Total	
Season	Club	Division	Apps	Goals	Apps	Goals	Apps	Goals
Viborg	2004–05	Danish Superliga	8	0	0	0	8	0
Viborg	2005–06	Danish Superliga	18	0	0	0	18	0
Viborg	2006–07	Danish Superliga	14	0	0	0	14	0
Lyn	2007	Tippeligaen	6	0	1	0	7	0
Lyn	2008	Tippeligaen	24	0	5	1	29	1
Lyn	2009	Tippeligaen	22	3	3	2	25	5
Hønefoss	2010	Tippeligaen	21	2	2	0	23	2
Hønefoss	2011	Adeccoligaen	14	2	3	2	17	4
Lillestrøm	2011	Tippeligaen	12	0	0	0	12	0
KuPS	2012	Veikkausliiga	27	2	8	0	35	2
Career total			166	9	22	5	188	14
