= Alexander Nadj =

Swedish footballer

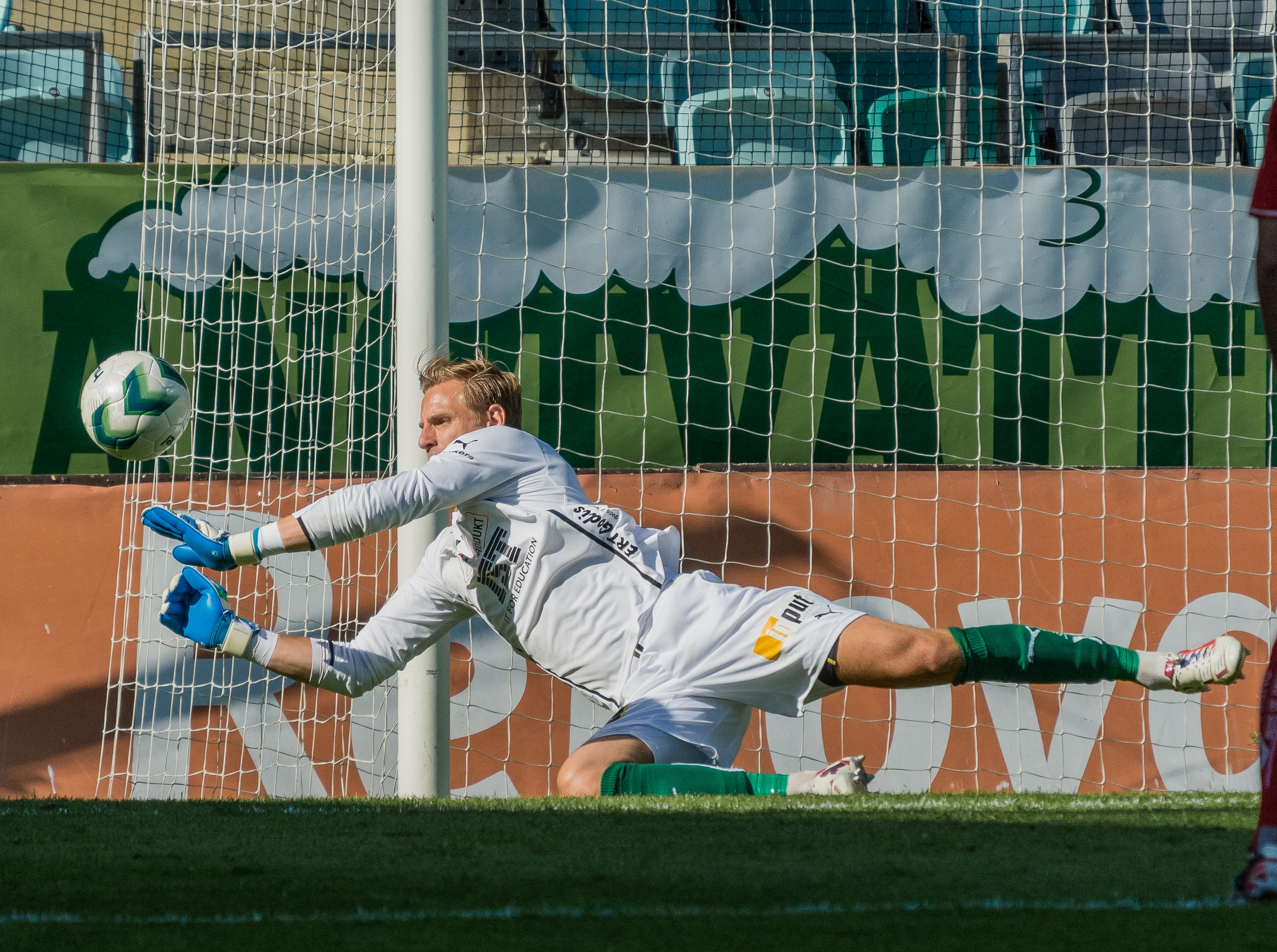

Personal information
- Date of birth: 26 August 1986 (age 40)
- Place of birth: Gothenburg, Sweden
- Height: 1.93 m (6 ft 4 in)
- Position: Goalkeeper

Youth career
- IFK Göteborg

Senior career*
Years	Team	Apps	(Gls)
2005–2008	IFK Göteborg	0	(0)
2006	→ Sandareds IF (loan)	11	(0)
2007	→ Raufoss (loan)	12	(0)
2008–2010	Jönköpings Södra IF	55	(0)
2011	Lillestrøm	1	(0)
2012–2014	Östers IF	46	(0)
2015–2017	BK Häcken	0	(0)
2017	Utsiktens BK	12	(0)
2018	GAIS	7	(0)
2019–2021	BK Häcken	0	(0)
- * Club domestic league appearances and goals as of 9 August 2020

Alexander Nadj (born 26 August 1986) is a Swedish footballer who plays as a goalkeeper. Nadj has previously played for IFK Göteborg, Sandareds IF, Raufoss, Jönköpings Södra IF, Lillestrøm, Östers IF and GAIS.

== Career ==
Hailing from Gothenburg, Nadj played for IFK Göteborg during his youth. He spent time on loan with Sandareds IF and Raufoss in 2007, where he was second-choice goalkeeper behind Rickard Claesson. He made his debut for Raufoss when the team lost 2–0 against Moss on 19 August 2007. Nadj played the 12 last matches for Raufoss in the 2007 season when the team was relegated from Adeccoligaen.

Before the 2008 season, Nadj joined Jönköpings Södra IF and signed a two-year contract with the club. He suffered from an injury in his second season with Jönköpings Södra, but despite only playing seven games in 2009 Nadj signed a new contract with Jönköpings Södra after the season, keeping him on the club until the end of the 2010 season. The club stated that they had two good goalkeepers in Nadj and Mikael Axelsson, but that they could only afford to sign a new contract with one of them.

Before the 2011 season, Nadji joined Norwegian club Lillestrøm. After spending the first half of the season on the bench, he played 13 minutes against Start on 29 June 2011 after the first-choice goalkeeper Stefán Logi Magnússon was sent off. Lillestrøm's head coach Henning Berg chose to play the youth-team goalkeeper Andreas Fjeldstad, aged 19, in the next match against Viking, and one week later Nadj was released by the club.

On 5 March 2012, Östers IF announced that they had signed Nadj as a replacement for the injured Joakim Wulff.

In January 2015, BK Häcken signed Alexander Nadj.

Nadj left GAIS at the end of the 2018 season.
