= Pål Steffen Andresen =

Norwegian footballer (born 1982)

Personal information
- Full name: Pål Steffen Andresen
- Date of birth: 19 May 1982 (age 44)
- Place of birth: Lillestrøm, Norway
- Height: 1.88 m (6 ft 2 in)
- Position: Defender

Team information
- Current team: hauerseter
- Number: 23

Youth career
- Lillestrøm

Senior career*
Years	Team	Apps	(Gls)
2001–2011	Lillestrøm	141	(5)
2012–2014	Ull/Kisa	75	(11)
2015–	Strømmen	111	(3)

International career
2003	Norway U21	4	(0)
- * Club domestic league appearances and goals as of 14 August 2018

Pål Steffen Andresen (born 19 May 1982) is a Norwegian football defender who plays for Strømmen.

== Club career ==
Andresen spent his entire career with Lillestrøm SK before joining Ull/Kisa in 2012. He has been capped 4 times for the Norwegian under-21 team.

== Career statistics ==
As of match played 14 August 2018.

Season	Club	Division	League		Cup		Total	
Season	Club	Division	Apps	Goals	Apps	Goals	Apps	Goals
2002	Lillestrøm	Tippeligaen	5	0	2	0	7	0
2003	Lillestrøm	Tippeligaen	16	0	1	0	17	0
2004	Lillestrøm	Tippeligaen	23	3	5	1	28	4
2005	Lillestrøm	Tippeligaen	25	1	5	1	30	2
2006	Lillestrøm	Tippeligaen	16	0	3	0	19	0
2007	Lillestrøm	Tippeligaen	23	1	5	0	28	1
2008	Lillestrøm	Tippeligaen	13	0	1	0	14	0
2009	Lillestrøm	Tippeligaen	3	0	0	0	3	0
2010	Lillestrøm	Tippeligaen	1	0	0	0	1	0
2011	Lillestrøm	Tippeligaen	16	0	2	1	18	1
2012	Ull/Kisa	Adeccoligaen	27	7	1	0	28	7
2013	Ull/Kisa	Adeccoligaen	27	1	2	0	29	1
2014	Ull/Kisa	1. divisjon	21	3	2	0	23	3
2015	Strømmen	OBOS-ligaen	27	0	2	0	29	0
2016	Strømmen	OBOS-ligaen	14	0	0	0	14	0
2017	Strømmen	OBOS-ligaen	20	1	0	0	20	1
2018	Strømmen	OBOS-ligaen	25	0	2	0	18	0
2019	Strømmen	OBOS-ligaen	19	2	2	0	21	2
Career Total			293	17	33	3	326	20
