= Morten Giæver =

Norwegian footballer (born 1982)

Personal information
- Date of birth: 20 May 1982 (age 44)
- Place of birth: Alta
- Position: Midfielder

Youth career
- Tromsø

Senior career*
Years	Team	Apps	(Gls)
1999–2001	Tromsø	3	(0)
2001	→ Finnsnes (loan)	6	(1)
2002–2005	Skarp	105	(50)
2006–2010	Tromsdalen	118	(22)
2010–2012	Sarpsborg 08	81	(23)
2013–2014	Ull/Kisa	47	(5)
2015–2016	Bærum	44	(8)
2017–2018	Moss	41	(8)
- * Club domestic league appearances and goals as of 29 January 2019

Morten Giæver (born 20 May 1982) is a Norwegian football midfielder who most recently played for Moss FK.

== Career ==
He was born in Alta, but moved to Tromsø at the age of two. As a footballer he came through the youth system of Tromsø IL; made his first-team debut in a friendly match in 1999 and then in the Norwegian Premier League in August 2000. He got three Premier League games in 2000 and 2001. In addition, while at Tromsø he spent some time on loan in Finnsnes IL.

After the 2001 season he joined IF Skarp. Ahead of the 2006 season he joined Tromsdalen UIL. After four seasons at TUIL he joined Sarpsborg 08 in 2010, where he helped the team achieving promotion to Tippeligaen, both in 2010 and 2012 (relegated in 2011).

Among Tromsø IL fans Giæver is still remembered for an incident in his first senior league match when he came on as a substitute in a home game against Molde FK in 2000. Six minutes into stoppage time Tromsø, that were trailing one goal, were awarded a penalty, and surprising the home crowd (and reportedly the Tromsø staff and players as well) Giæver, then aged 18, stepped up. He blasted the penalty wide, effectively wasting the occasion for a late equalizer. Some cite the incident (and the ensuing ill treatment by fans as well as fellow players) as one of the reasons Giæver, considered to hold great potential and to be as promising as fellow junior Morten Gamst Pedersen, never became a big hit at Alfheim.

In 2004, he was sentenced to two weeks in prison for refusing mandatory military service.

== Career statistics ==
As of 14 April 2015

Season	Club	Division	League		Cup		Total	
Season	Club	Division	Apps	Goals	Apps	Goals	Apps	Goals
2006	Tromsdalen	Adeccoligaen	28	3	2	0	30	3
2007	Tromsdalen	Adeccoligaen	29	3	3	0	32	3
2008	Tromsdalen	Second Division	26	11	2	2	28	13
2009	Tromsdalen	Adeccoligaen	26	3	1	0	27	3
2010	Sarpsborg 08	Adeccoligaen	24	11	3	0	27	11
2011	Sarpsborg 08	Tippeligaen	30	5	4	1	34	6
2012	Sarpsborg 08	Adeccoligaen	27	7	2	3	29	10
2013	Ull/Kisa	Adeccoligaen	28	3	3	3	31	6
2014	Ull/Kisa	1. divisjon	19	2	1	1	20	3
2015	Bærum	OBOS-ligaen	14	2	2	0	16	2
Career Total			251	50	23	10	274	60
