= Abdullahi Oyedele =

Nigerian footballer

Personal information
- Full name: Abdullahi Adekunle Oyedele
- Date of birth: 15 July 1999 (age 27)
- Place of birth: Ibadan, Nigeria
- Position: Midfielder

Team information
- Current team: Termy Poddębice
- Number: 19

Youth career
- ABS FC

Senior career*
Years	Team	Apps	(Gls)
2018	Saxan	9	(8)
2019	Slutsk	9	(0)
2021–2022	Remo Stars	7	(1)
2024–2025	Warta Sieradz	41	(4)
2025–2026	Mazovia Mińsk Mazowiecki	8	(0)
2026–	Termy Poddębice	17	(6)
- * Club domestic league appearances and goals as of 21:25, 22 June 2026 (UTC)

Abdullahi Adekunle Oyedele (born 15 July 1999) is a Nigerian footballer who plays as a midfielder for Polish club Termy Poddębice.

== Honours ==
Mazovia Mińsk Mazowiecki

- Polish Cup (Siedlce regionals): 2025–26
