= Effiom Otu Bassey =

Nigerian former footballer

Personal information
- Date of birth: 24 June 1992 (age 34)
- Place of birth: Lagos, Nigeria
- Position: Midfielder

Senior career*
Years	Team	Apps	(Gls)
2009—2011, 2013	Bukola Babes		
2011—2012	Lillestrøm SK		
- * Club domestic league appearances and goals

Effiom Otu Bassey (born 24 June 1992) is a Nigerian former football midfielder. He played for Bukola Babes between 2009 and 2011 before being traded to Lillestrøm SK. Fellow Nigerians Anthony Ujah and Nosa Igiebor were also traded as part of the transaction. Ahead of the 2012 season it was decided to loan him back to the Bukola Babes. Management changed following the 2012 season and Otu Bassey was released from the team despite his contract not being due to expire until 2014. Otu Bassey returned to Bukola, now called ABS FC, during the summer of 2013 but was told he would not play in any League games until his performance improved. He has not appeared in any League games since 27 November 2011.
