= Mats Haakenstad =

Norwegian footballer (born 1993)

Personal information
- Date of birth: 14 November 1993 (age 32)
- Place of birth: Horten, Norway
- Height: 1.83 m (6 ft 0 in)
- Position: Right back

Youth career
- –2007: Borre
- 2008–2009: Falk
- 2010: Sandefjord

Senior career*
Years	Team	Apps	(Gls)
2012–2014	Fram Larvik	59	(3)
2014–2015	Sandefjord	11	(0)
2015–2016	Fram Larvik	39	(4)
2017–2020	Lillestrøm	76	(4)
2020	KuPS	2	(0)
2020	→ KuFu-98 (loan)	3	(0)
2020–2022	Sandefjord	47	(2)
2023	Kongsvinger	28	(3)
- * Club domestic league appearances and goals as of 18 August 2024

Mats Haakenstad (born 14 November 1993) is a Norwegian footballer who plays as right back who last played for Kongsvinger.

A career highlight was winning the 2017 Norwegian Football Cup with Lillestrøm SK, with Haakenstad scoring a goal in the 2017 Norwegian Football Cup final.

== Career statistics ==
=== Club ===
As of match played 23 April 2022

Appearances and goals by club, season and competition
Club	Season	League			National Cup		Continental		Other		Total	
Club	Season	Division	Apps	Goals	Apps	Goals	Apps	Goals	Apps	Goals	Apps	Goals
Fram Larvik	2012	2. divisjon	25	2	1	0	-		-		26	2
Fram Larvik	2013	2. divisjon	23	1	0	0	-		-		23	1
Fram Larvik	2014	2. divisjon	11	0	2	0	-		-		13	0
Fram Larvik	Total		59	3	3	0	-	-	-	-	62	3
Sandefjord	2014	1. divisjon	6	0	0	0	-		-		6	0
Sandefjord	2015	Tippeligaen	5	0	2	2	-		-		7	2
Sandefjord	Total		11	0	2	2	-	-	-	-	13	2
Fram Larvik	2015	2. divisjon	13	0	0	0	-		-		13	0
Fram Larvik	2016	2. divisjon	26	4	2	0	-		-		28	4
Fram Larvik	Total		39	4	2	0	-	-	-	-	41	4
Lillestrøm	2017	Eliteserien	30	1	7	1	-		-		37	2
Lillestrøm	2018	Eliteserien	27	2	6	1	2	0	1	0	36	3
Lillestrøm	2019	Eliteserien	19	1	3	0	-		-		22	1
Lillestrøm	Total		76	4	16	2	2	0	1	0	95	6
KuPS	2020	Veikkausliiga	2	0	7	0	-		-		9	0
KuPS	Total		2	0	7	0	-	-	-	-	9	0
Sandefjord	2020	Eliteserien	9	0	-		-		-		9	0
Sandefjord	2021	Eliteserien	17	0	2	0	-		-		19	0
Sandefjord	2022	Eliteserien	22	2	0	0	-		2	0	24	2
Sandefjord	Total		47	2	2	0	-	-	2	0	51	2
Career total			216	11	30	4	2	0	3	0	251	15
