= Steinar Pedersen =

Norwegian footballer and manager (born 1975)

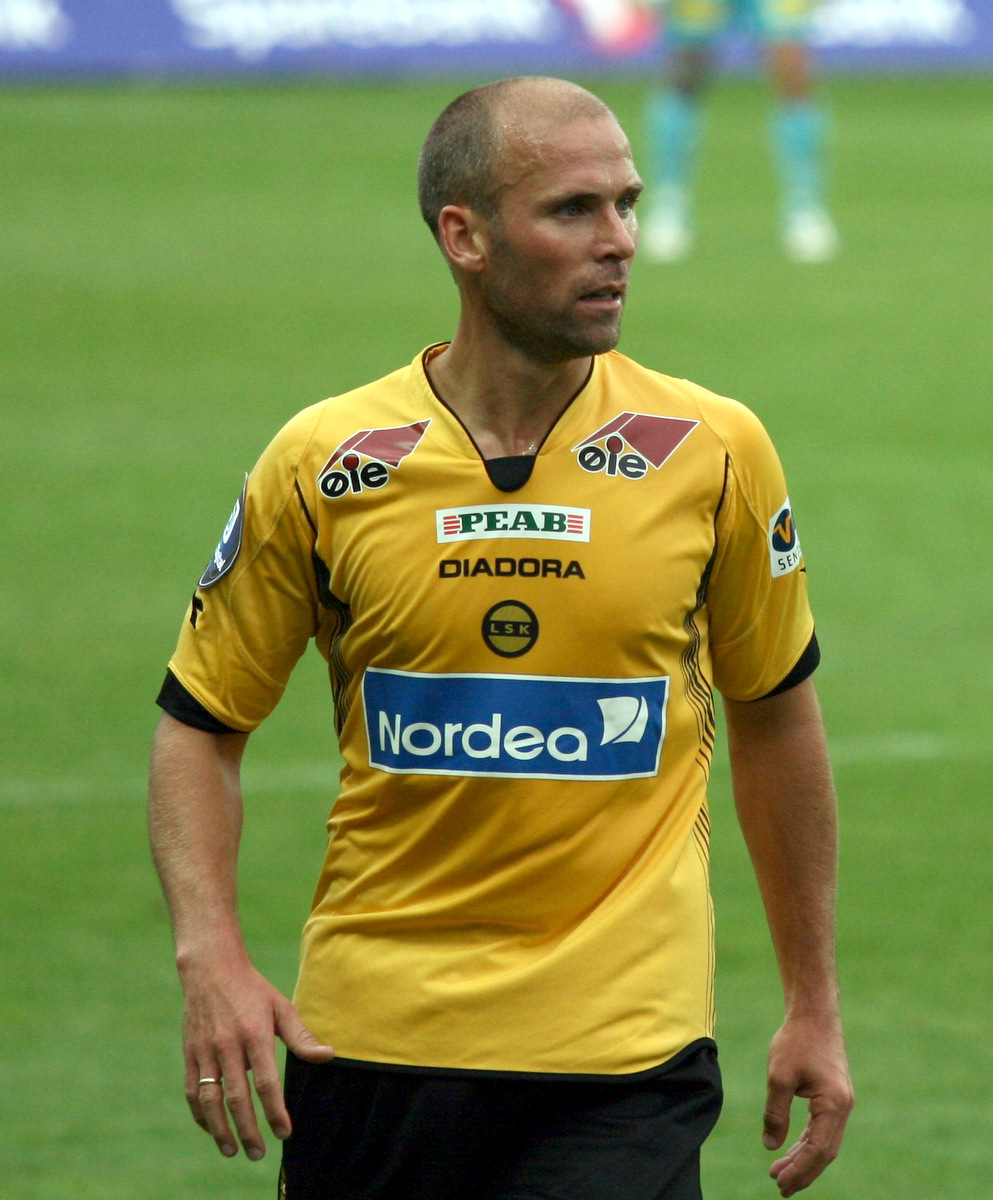
- Pedersen with Lillestrøm

Personal information
- Date of birth: 6 June 1975 (age 51)
- Place of birth: Kristiansand, Norway
- Height: 1.81 m (5 ft 11 in)
- Position: Defender

Team information
- Current team: Amazon Grimstad (manager)

Senior career*
Years	Team	Apps	(Gls)
1994–1996	Start	57	(4)
1996–1998	Borussia Dortmund	4	(0)
1997	→ Lillestrøm (loan)	24	(0)
1999–2001	IFK Göteborg	53	(1)
2002–2007	Start	156	(13)
2008–2012	Lillestrøm	105	(7)
2009	→ Strømsgodset (loan)	17	(0)
2012	Start	10	(0)
Total		426	(25)

International career
2006	Norway	1	(0)

Managerial career
- 2014–2015: Jerv
- 2016–2017: Start
- 2018–2020: Arendal
- 2021–: Amazon Grimstad
- * Club domestic league appearances and goals

Steinar Pedersen (born 6 June 1975) is a former Norwegian football defender. He is the son of Erik Ruthford Pedersen and brother of Kjetil Ruthford Pedersen. Pedersen is the first Norwegian to win the UEFA Champions League.

His career began with Start. After their relegation in 1996, he played for Borussia Dortmund, IFK Göteborg and Lillestrøm before returning to Start in 2002. With Borussia Dortmund he won the 1997 Champions League, although he did not play in the final. He did however make two appearances en route to the final. He was capped once for the Norway national team, in a 5–0 friendly loss to the USA.
