= Erling Knudtzon =

Norwegian footballer (born 1988)

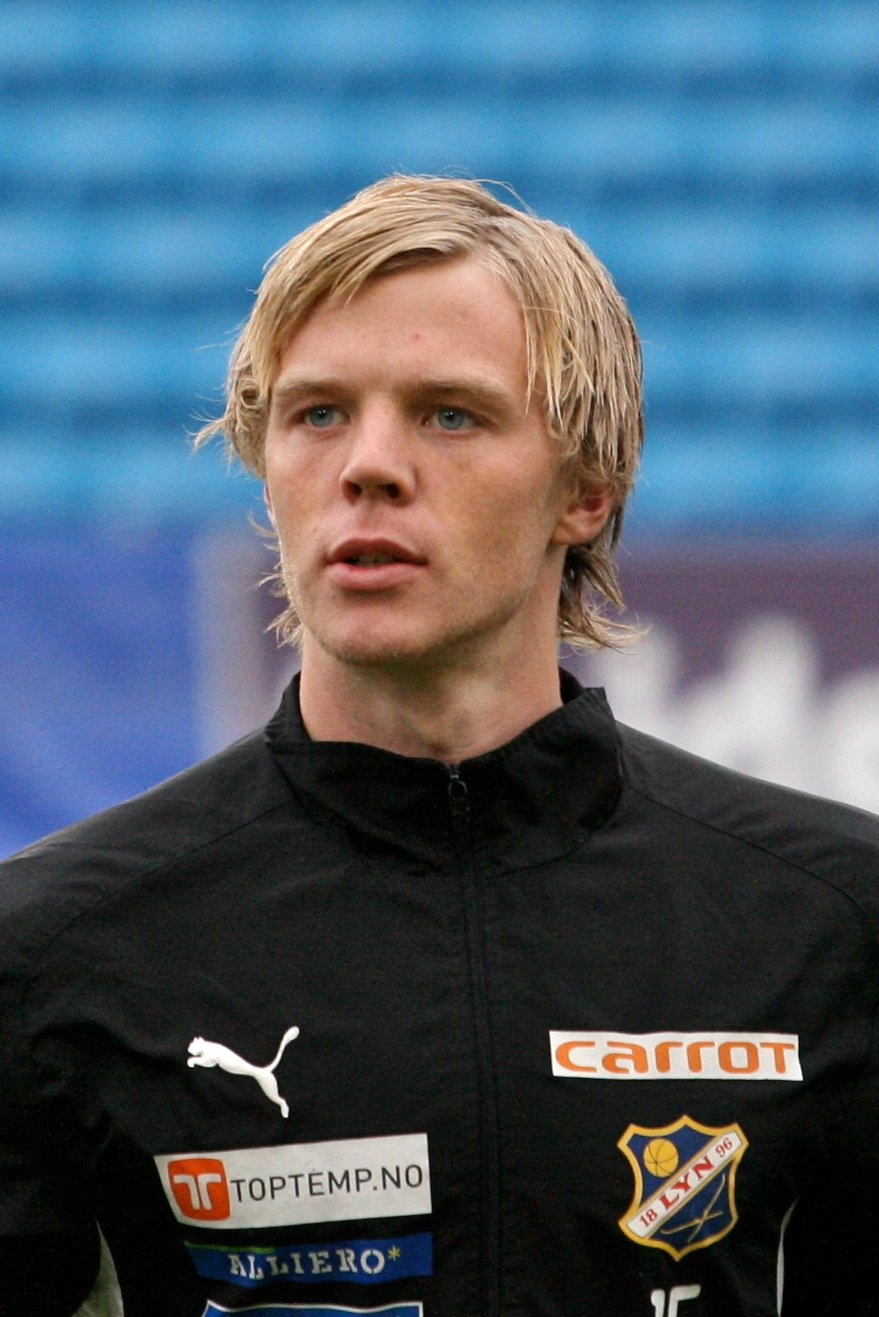

Personal information
- Date of birth: 15 December 1988 (age 37)
- Place of birth: Oslo, Norway
- Height: 1.78 m (5 ft 10 in)
- Position: Midfielder

Youth career
- –2003: Ullern

Senior career*
Years	Team	Apps	(Gls)
2004–2006	Ullern		
2007–2010	Lyn	66	(4)
2010–2018	Lillestrøm	231	(42)
2019–2023	Molde	113	(8)
2024	Lillestrøm	11	(1)

International career^{‡}
2007	Norway U19	3	(1)
2007–2010	Norway U21	12	(0)
2012	Norway U23	2	(1)
- * Club domestic league appearances and goals as of 23 November 2024 ‡ National team caps and goals as of 16 October 2012

Erling Knudtzon (born 15 December 1988) is a Norwegian professional footballer who plays as a midfielder. He last played for Eliteserien club Lillestrøm.

== Club career ==
=== Early career ===
Knudtzon began his career with Ullern, joining FC Lyn Oslo in 2007. He made his first team debut on 14 April 2007 against Fredrikstad, and played twenty Norwegian top flight games in his first season, most of them as a starter.

=== Lillestrøm SK ===
On 1 February 2010 Knudtzon signed a three-year contract with Lillestrøm, and reunited with his former coach Henning Berg. Knudtzon played 231 league games for the club.

=== Molde FK ===
On 17 July 2018, Molde FK announced that they had signed Knudtzon to a three-year contract, beginning 1 January 2019. He made his Molde debut on 31 March 2019 in a 1–1 away draw against Sarpsborg 08. On 22 April 2019, Knudtzon scored his first goal for Molde in the club's 2–0 away win against his former team Lillestrøm. The game also marked his 300th appearance in the top division of Norwegian football.

=== Return to Lillestrøm ===
On 15 December 2023, Lillestrøm announced the return of Knudtzon on a one-year contract.

== International career ==
Knudtzon played a total of 17 games and scored two goals for Norway at international youth and under-23 level.

== Career statistics ==
=== Club ===
As of match played 9 November 2024

Appearances and goals by club, season and competition
Club	Season	League			National Cup		Continental		Other		Total	
Club	Season	Division	Apps	Goals	Apps	Goals	Apps	Goals	Apps	Goals	Apps	Goals
Lyn	2007	Tippeligaen	20	3	5	0	—		—		25	3
Lyn	2008	Tippeligaen	19	0	3	0	—		—		22	0
Lyn	2009	Tippeligaen	26	1	3	1	—		—		29	2
Lyn	Total		65	4	11	1	—		—		76	5
Lillestrøm	2010	Tippeligaen	23	0	1	0	—		—		24	0
Lillestrøm	2011	Tippeligaen	21	2	2	0	—		—		23	2
Lillestrøm	2012	Tippeligaen	29	8	4	1	—		—		33	9
Lillestrøm	2013	Tippeligaen	23	2	5	0	—		—		28	2
Lillestrøm	2014	Tippeligaen	27	6	4	1	—		—		31	7
Lillestrøm	2015	Tippeligaen	29	10	2	0	—		—		31	10
Lillestrøm	2016	Tippeligaen	27	5	1	0	—		—		28	5
Lillestrøm	2017	Eliteserien	29	8	5	1	—		—		34	9
Lillestrøm	2018	Eliteserien	23	1	3	0	2 (Note: Appearances in UEFA Europa League)	0	1 (Note: Appearance in Mesterfinalen)	0	29	1
Lillestrøm	Total		231	42	26	3	2	0	1	0	260	45
Molde	2019	Eliteserien	20	3	2	0	7	1	—		29	4
Molde	2020	Eliteserien	27	2	—		10 (Note: Five appearances and one goal in UEFA Champions League, five appearances in UEFA Europa League)	1	—		37	3
Molde	2021	Eliteserien	25	1	3	0	8 (Note: Four appearances in UEFA Europa League, four appearances in UEFA Europa Conference League)	0	—		36	1
Molde	2022	Eliteserien	26	2	7	0	9 (Note: Appearances in UEFA Europa Conference League)	0	—		42	2
Molde	2023	Eliteserien	15	0	5	0	3 (Note: Appearances in UEFA Champions League)	0	—		22	0
Molde	Total		113	8	17	0	37	2	—		166	10
Lillestrøm	2024	Eliteserien	11	1	2	0	—		0	0	13	1
Career total			420	55	56	4	39	2	1	0	515	61

== Honours ==
=== Club ===
Lillestrøm SK

- Norwegian Cup: 2017

Molde

- Eliteserien: 2019, 2022
- Norwegian Cup: 2021–22, 2023
