= Strike action in association football =

Association football has a history of strike action, stretching from the 20th century to the 21st century and in several countries, including England, Italy, Norway, Portugal, Scotland, Spain, and the United States.

== History ==
=== England ===
During 1960 the Professional Footballers' Association (PFA), led by Jimmy Hill, organised a campaign seeking the abolition of the maximum wage, which then stood at £20 per week, and of the retain and transfer system. Following talks involving the PFA, the Football Association, the Football League and the Ministry of Labour, the Football League committee offered a gradual increase in the maximum to £30, taking place over five years. At a PFA meeting in London, 250 players voted unanimously for strike action. Two further meetings elsewhere in the country brought the total to 712 players, of whom 18 voted against strike action. On 9 January 1961 the League made a revised proposal, but PFA members rejected it by a three to one margin. On 18 January, three days before the planned strike, the parties agreed to an immediate abolition of the maximum wage and the strike was called off.

In September 2011, players from Plymouth Argyle considered going on strike due to a dispute over unpaid wages.

=== Italy ===
Serie A players held their first organized strike in March 1996. The start to the 2011–12 season was delayed due to strike action by players, following a failure of the players' and clubs' respective unions to agree on a new collective bargaining agreement. On 5 September 2011, the strike was called off after a compromise was reached.

=== Norway ===
In Norway, short-term player strike action led to the cancellation of fixtures in the Tippeligaen and Adeccoligaen in both June 2002 and May 2011. The 2002 dispute was related to insurance coverage, salary terms, and working conditions in the Norwegian league. The 2011 action was prompted by regulations on holidays and whether players were required to use football boots and sports equipment produced by respective club sponsors. In both periods the disputes were settled after one round of league fixtures.

=== Spain ===
In November 2009, Spanish players threatened a strike due to tax increases.

In March 2011, Spanish league matches were postponed due to a dispute over television revenue. The strike was later blocked by the Spanish courts.

In August 2011, further strike action was announced, after players asked for a guaranteed wage, in case their clubs went bankrupt, and the strike action disrupted the first week of the Spanish season. Players including Ikechukwu Uche spoke to the media to explain the reasons for the strike.

On 25 August, it was announced that talks between the Liga de Futbol Profesional (LFP) and Association of Spanish Footballers had reached a resolution, and that league football would resume the next weekend.

In March 2012, professional footballers from Rayo Vallecano went on strike in support of the 2011–2012 Spanish protests.

A 2013–14 Copa del Rey match between Racing Santander and Real Sociedad was suspended after Santander players, having worked without pay for several months, followed through on their previously announced strike action.

=== United States ===
Members of the MLS Players Union voted for a strike to delay the start of the 2010 Major League Soccer season, as scheduled for March 2010. The main issues for the players related to guaranteed contracts and freedom of transfer. The season commenced after the dispute was settled five days before the first scheduled game.
