= Bajram Ajeti =

Norwegian footballer (born 1989)

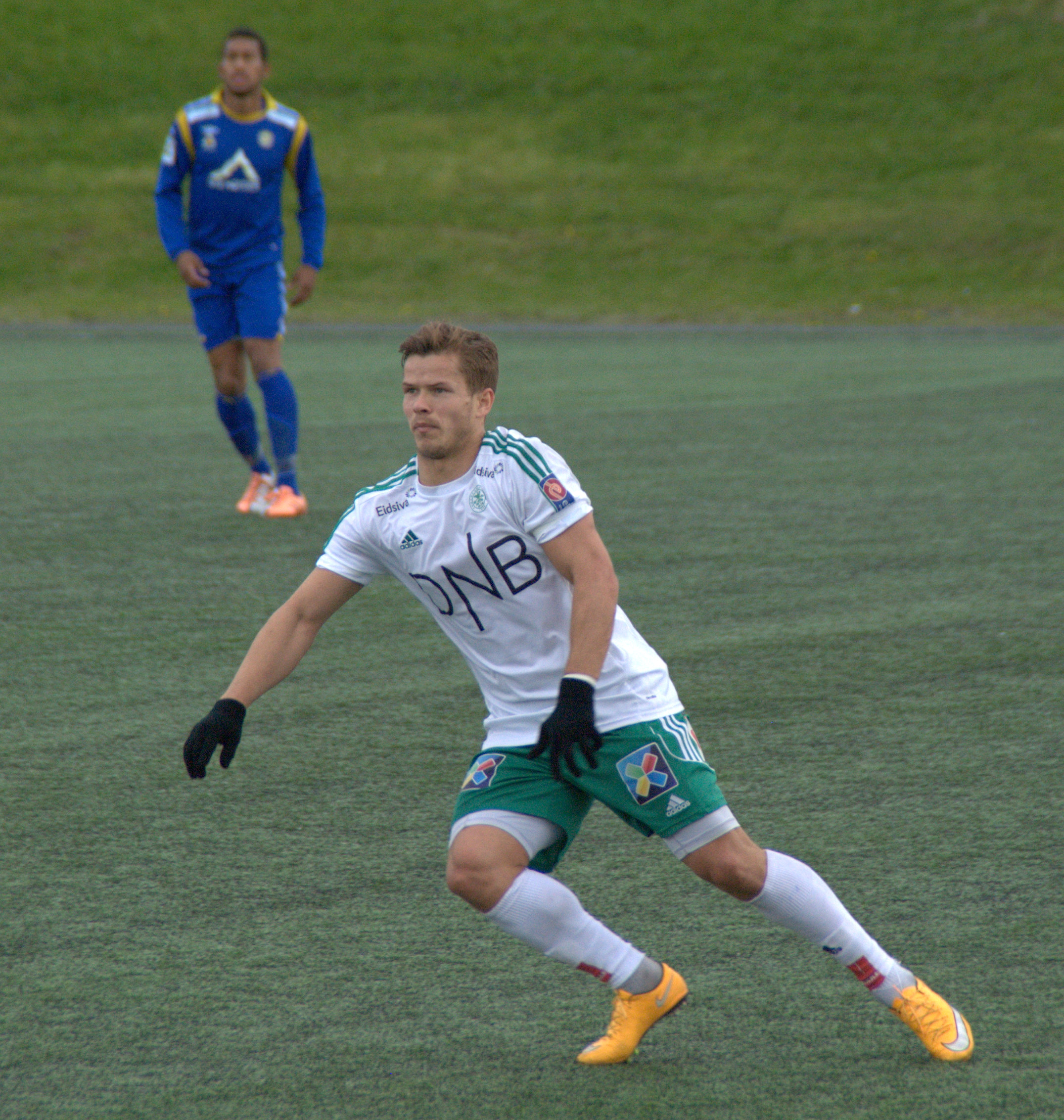
- Ajeti playing for Hamarkameratene in 2015

Personal information
- Date of birth: 5 May 1989 (age 37)
- Place of birth: Skenderaj, SFR Yugoslavia
- Height: 1.76 m (5 ft 9 1/2 in)
- Position: Forward

Team information
- Current team: Hokksund FK
- Number: 9

Youth career
- IF Birkebeineren
- Vålerenga
- 2007–2008: Mjøndalen

Senior career*
Years	Team	Apps	(Gls)
2009–2011	Mjøndalen	47	(12)
2012	Birkebeineren	24	(16)
2013	Asker	23	(27)
2014	Sandefjord	0	(0)
2014	Kongsvinger	17	(10)
2015	Hamarkameratene	19	(14)
2016	Moss	16	(9)
2016	Bryne	9	(4)
2017	Lillestrøm	12	(0)
2017	Gefle IF	11	(11)
2018	IF Brommapojkarna	8	(2)
2018	AFC Eskilstuna	11	(4)
2019	Afjet Afyonspor	14	(4)
2020	Umeå FC	15	(4)
2022–2023	Åskollen FK	13	(4)
2024–	Hokksund FK	45	(30)
- * Club domestic league appearances and goals as of 16:22, 13 June 2021 (UTC)

Bajram Ajeti (born 5 May 1989) is a Kosovan professional footballer who plays as a forward for Norwegian club Hokksund FK.

== Career ==
Ajeti began his youth career at IF Birkebeineren. He also played as a junior for Vålerenga before joining Mjøndalen IF in 2007. Ajeti made his senior debut for Mjøndalen in the Adeccoligaen in 2009 and spent three seasons with the first team. In February 2012, he signed a one-year contract with Birkebeineren. Ahead of the 2013 season, he joined Asker.

On 4 February 2014, Ajeti signed a two-year contract with Sandefjord. On 24 February 2014, he was sentenced to ten months in prison for an assault committed in Drammen during the summer of 2013. As a result, his newly signed contract with Sandefjord was terminated. In March 2014, shortly after his sentence, Ajeti signed with Kongsvinger.

After serving his prison sentence, Ajeti joined Hamarkameratene in May 2015. In February 2016, he signed a one-year contract with Moss FK. In August 2016, he moved to Bryne FK. In January 2017, he signed a one-year contract with Lillestrøm SK of the Eliteserien.

In August 2017, Ajeti joined Gefle IF on a contract for the remainder of the season. He made his Superettan debut on 12 August 2017 in a 1–1 draw against Östers IF, scoring his first goal in the same match. He scored 11 goals in 11 league matches.

In January 2018, Ajeti signed with IF Brommapojkarna on a contract through the 2020 season. His contract was terminated on 31 July 2018. On 11 August 2018, he signed with AFC Eskilstuna for the remainder of the season. On 21 January 2019, Ajeti joined Turkish club Afjet Afyonspor.

In February 2020, Ajeti signed with Umeå FC. He left the club after the 2020 season.
