= Aleksander Melgalvis Andreassen =

Norwegian footballer (born 1989)

Aleksander Melgalvis
Personal information
- Full name: Aleksander Melgalvis Andreassen
- Date of birth: 10 August 1989 (age 37)
- Place of birth: Hamar, Norway
- Position: Defender

Team information
- Current team: Ridabu
- Number: 33

Senior career*
Years	Team	Apps	(Gls)
2006–2011	Brumunddal		
2012	Kongsvinger	29	(3)
2013–2014	Brumunddal	47	(19)
2015–2016	Strømmen	58	(8)
2017–2020	Lillestrøm	100	(12)
2021–2023	HamKam	79	(12)
2024–	Ridabu	0	(0)
- * Club domestic league appearances and goals as of 4 December 2023

Aleksander Melgalvis Andreassen (born 10 August 1989) is a Norwegian footballer who plays for Ridabu.
