= Frode Kippe =

Norwegian footballer (born 1978)

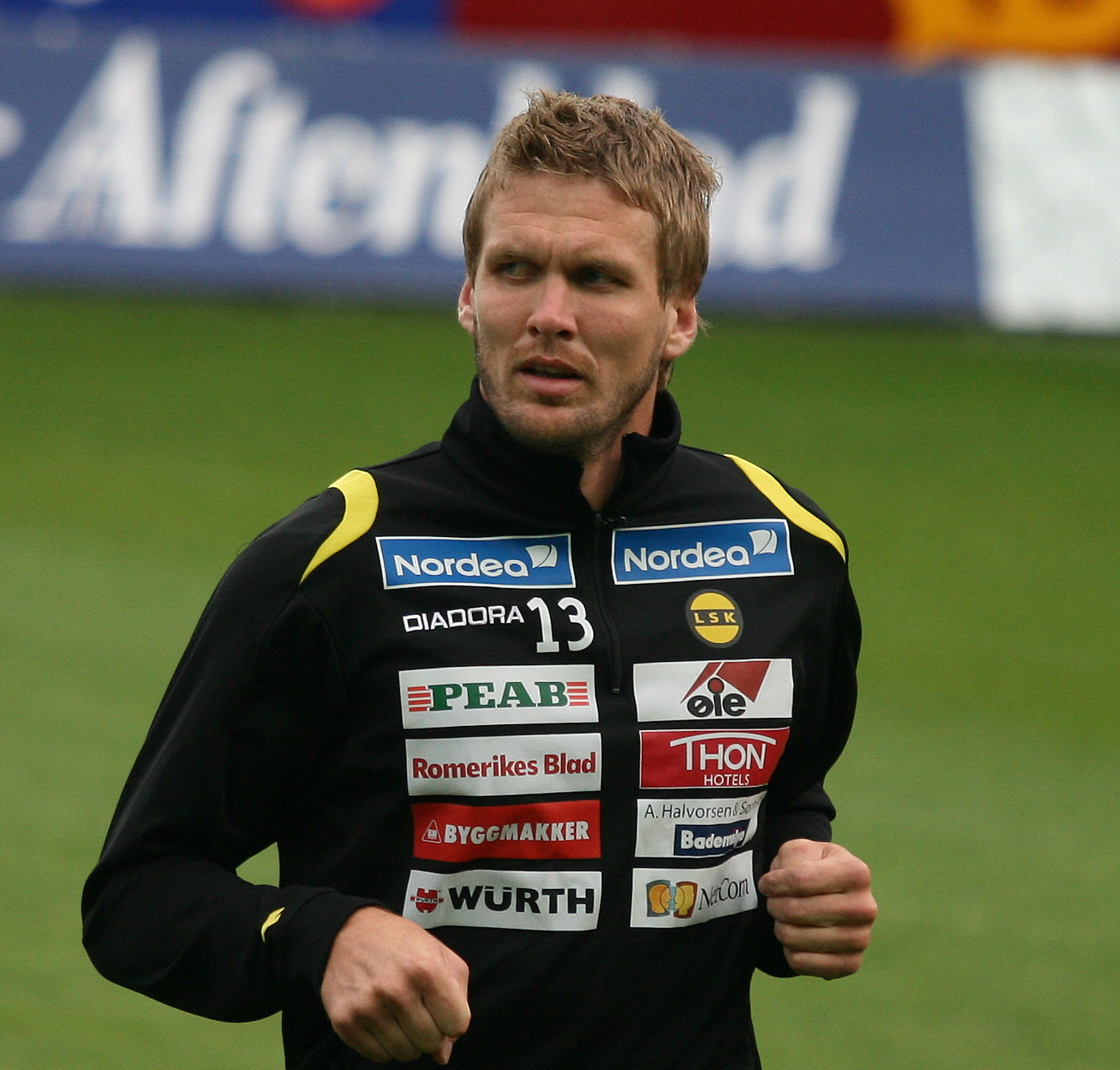
- Kippe with Lillestrøm in 2008

Personal information
- Date of birth: 17 January 1978 (age 48)
- Place of birth: Oslo, Norway
- Height: 6 ft 5 in (1.96 m)
- Position: Central defender

Team information
- Current team: Lillestrøm (assistant manager)

Youth career
- Kolbotn

Senior career*
Years	Team	Apps	(Gls)
1997–1998	Lillestrøm	33	(2)
1998–2002	Liverpool	0	(0)
1999–2000	→ Stoke City (loan)	15	(1)
2000–2001	→ Stoke City (loan)	19	(0)
2002–2019	Lillestrøm	408	(42)
2020	Lillestrøm	3	(0)
2021	Kolbotn	6	(3)
Total		475	(45)

International career
1997–1999	Norway U21	27	(1)
1998	Norway U23	3	(0)
2003–2008	Norway	8	(0)

Managerial career
- 2020–: Lillestrøm (player developer)
- 2023–: Lillestrøm (assistant)
- * Club domestic league appearances and goals

Frode Kippe (born 17 January 1978) is a Norwegian former professional footballer who played as a central defender, mostly for Lillestrøm in the Eliteserien. He made eight appearances for the Norway national team. With 441 top division appearances, Kippe has made the third-highest number of appearances in Eliteserien.

== Playing career ==
Kippe started his career playing amateur football for Kolbotn, but moved to top-flight side Lillestrøm at the age of 19 to play professionally. At the end of the 1998 season Kippe was signed by English Premier League club Liverpool. At Anfield he was restricted to just two substitute appearances in the League Cup against Hull City and Grimsby Town. Kippe instead spent time out on loan at Stoke City where he linked up with a number of Scandinavian players. He played 20 times for Stoke in 1999–2000 scoring against Preston North End and returned in 2000–01 where he played 24 times. Kippe returned to Norway in 2002 and re-signed for Lillestrøm where he was made club captain and led the team to victory in the 2007 Norwegian Cup Final and the 2017 Norwegian Cup Final, where he even scored a goal. On 23 October 2019, Kippe announced that he would retire as player at the end of the 2019 season.

On 4 November 2020, Kippe made comeback for Lillestrøm. He then played a handful of games for Kolbotn in the 2021 4. divisjon.

== Managerial career ==
Following his retirement after the 2019 season, Kippe was hired as a player developer in Lillestrøm, serving under the head of player development Antoni Ordinas. When Simon Mesfin became interim manager in the summer of 2023, Kippe was promoted to assistant manager.

== Career statistics ==
=== Club ===
Appearances and goals by club, season and competition
Season	Club	League			Cup		Europe		Other		Total	
Season	Club	Division	Apps	Goals	Apps	Goals	Apps	Goals	Apps	Goals	Apps	Goals
Lillestrøm	1997	Tippeligaen	9	0	0	0	4 (Note: Appearances in the UEFA Cup qualifying rounds)	0	—		13	0
Lillestrøm	1998	Tippeligaen	24	2	0	0	—		—		24	2
Lillestrøm	Total		33	2	0	0	4	0	—	—	37	2
Liverpool	1999–2000	Premier League	0	0	1	0	0	0	—		1	0
Liverpool	2001–02	Premier League	0	0	1	0	0	0	—		1	0
Liverpool	Total		0	0	2	0	0	0	—	—	2	0
Stoke City (loan)	1999–2000	Second Division	15	1	0	0	—		5 (Note: Appearances in the Football League Trophy)	0	20	1
Stoke City (loan)	2000–01	Second Division	19	0	0	0	—		5 (Note: Three appearances in the Football League Trophy and two in the Second Division play-offs)	0	24	0
Stoke City (loan)	Total		34	1	0	0	—	—	10	0	44	1
Lillestrøm	2002	Tippeligaen	15	1	2	2	2 (Note: Appearances in the UEFA Champions League qualifying rounds)	0	—		19	3
Lillestrøm	2003	Tippeligaen	25	5	4	3	—		—		29	8
Lillestrøm	2004	Tippeligaen	23	2	6	0	—		—		29	2
Lillestrøm	2005	Tippeligaen	19	1	7	1	—		4 (Note: Appearances in the Royal League group stage)	1	30	3
Lillestrøm	2006	Tippeligaen	25	3	3	1	1 (Note: Appearance in the Intertoto Cup)	0	10 (Note: Two appearances in the 2005–06 Royal League group stage, two appearances in the 2005–06 Royal League knockout stages and six appearances in the 2006–07 Royal League group stage)	1	39	5
Lillestrøm	2007	Tippeligaen	18	0	6	2	1 (Note: Appearance in the UEFA Cup qualifying rounds)	0	1 (Note: Appearance in the 2006–07 Royal League quarter-final)	0	25	2
Lillestrøm	2008	Tippeligaen	23	1	2	0	2 (Note: Appearances in the UEFA Cup qualifying rounds)	1	—		27	2
Lillestrøm	2009	Tippeligaen	28	5	4	1	—		—		32	6
Lillestrøm	2010	Tippeligaen	30	7	3	0	—		—		33	7
Lillestrøm	2011	Tippeligaen	25	3	4	1	—		—		29	4
Lillestrøm	2012	Tippeligaen	22	2	4	2	—		—		26	4
Lillestrøm	2013	Tippeligaen	24	2	5	0	—		—		29	2
Lillestrøm	2014	Tippeligaen	19	3	3	0	—		—		22	3
Lillestrøm	2015	Tippeligaen	24	1	0	0	—		—		24	1
Lillestrøm	2016	Tippeligaen	22	1	2	0	—		—		24	1
Lillestrøm	2017	Eliteserien	24	5	6	1	—		—		30	6
Lillestrøm	2018	Eliteserien	26	0	3	0	2	0	1 (Note: Mesterfinalen vs. Rosenborg)	0	32	0
Lillestrøm	2019	Eliteserien	16	0	0	0	0	0	0	0	16	0
Lillestrøm	2020	1. divisjon	3	0	—		—		—		3	0
Lillestrøm	Total		411	42	64	16	12	1	16	2	503	61
Career total			478	45	66	18	12	1	26	2	582	66

=== International ===
Appearances and goals by national team and year
National team	Year	Apps	Goals
Norway	2003	1	0
Norway	2005	3	0
Norway	2006	2	0
Norway	2007	1	0
Norway	2008	1	0
Total		8	0

== Honours ==
Lillestrøm

- Norwegian Cup: 2007, 2017

Individual

- Kniksen award: Defender of the Year in 2007
