= Simen Kind Mikalsen =

Norwegian footballer (born 1992)

Personal information
- Date of birth: 4 May 1993 (age 33)
- Place of birth: Jessheim, Norway
- Height: 1.84 m (6 ft 1/2 in)
- Position: Defender

Team information
- Current team: Råde
- Number: 3

Youth career
- 2009–2010: Ull/Kisa

Senior career*
Years	Team	Apps	(Gls)
2011–2013	Ull/Kisa	46	(3)
2014–2021	Lillestrøm	157	(12)
2022–	Råde	35	(27)

International career^{‡}
2013–2014	Norway U21	2	(0)
- * Club domestic league appearances and goals as of 15 August 2023 ‡ National team caps and goals as of 4 April 2014

Simen Kind Mikalsen (born 4 May 1993) is a Norwegian football defender who currently plays for Råde.

== Career statistics ==
As of 14 December 2020

Season	Club	Division	League		Cup		Total	
Season	Club	Division	Apps	Goals	Apps	Goals	Apps	Goals
2012	Ull/Kisa	1. divisjon	19	2	3	0	22	2
2013	Ull/Kisa	1. divisjon	27	1	0	0	27	1
2014	Lillestrøm	Tippeligaen	16	0	3	0	19	0
2015	Lillestrøm	Tippeligaen	27	2	3	0	30	2
2016	Lillestrøm	Tippeligaen	27	4	2	0	29	4
2017	Lillestrøm	Eliteserien	27	4	7	3	34	7
2018	Lillestrøm	Eliteserien	25	0	4	0	29	0
2019	Lillestrøm	Eliteserien	16	1	0	0	16	1
2020	Lillestrøm	OBOS-ligaen	18	1	0	0	18	1
Career Total			202	15	22	3	224	18
