= 2012 Lillestrøm SK season =

Lillestrøm
2012 season
- Chairman: Per Mathisen
- Head coach: Magnus Haglund
- Stadium: Åråsen Stadion
- Tippeligaen: 9th
- Norwegian Cup: Fourth round vs Bodø/Glimt
- Top goalscorer: League: Erling Knudtzon (8); All: Björn Bergmann Sigurdarson (12)

The 2012 season saw Lillestrøm compete in the Tippeligaen as well as the 2012 Norwegian Football Cup. They finished the season in 9th in the Tippeligaen and they were knocked out of in the Fourth Round by Bodø/Glimt. It was the club's first season with Magnus Haglund as their manager.

== Squad ==
As of 1 September 2012

Note: Flags indicate national team as defined under FIFA eligibility rules; some limited exceptions apply. Players may hold more than one non-FIFA nationality.

No.	Pos.	Nation	Player
1	GK	NOR	Lasse Staw
4	DF	NOR	Espen Nystuen
5	DF	SWE	Jesper Westerberg
6	MF	NOR	Espen Søgård
7	FW	SWE	Johan Andersson
8	MF	NOR	Bjørn Helge Riise
9	FW	NOR	Fredrik Gulbrandsen
10	MF	NOR	Petter Vaagan Moen
11	MF	NOR	Erling Knudtzon
12	GK	BIH	Sead Ramović
13	DF	NOR	Frode Kippe (captain)
14	MF	ISL	Pálmi Rafn Pálmason

No.	Pos.	Nation	Player
16	FW	NOR	Ohi Omoijuanfo
19	DF	NOR	Anders Østli
20	DF	NOR	Stian Ringstad
21	FW	CIV	Moryké Fofana
22	FW	NOR	Thorstein Helstad
23	MF	NOR	Henning Hauger (on loan from Hanover)
25	MF	CMR	Guy Roger Toindouba
26	MF	NOR	Mathis Bolly
27	DF	SWE	Fredrik Stoor (on loan from Vålerenga)
28	MF	NOR	Ruben Gabrielsen
—	GK	ISL	Stefán Logi Magnússon

=== Out on loan ===
Note: Flags indicate national team as defined under FIFA eligibility rules; some limited exceptions apply. Players may hold more than one non-FIFA nationality.

No.	Pos.	Nation	Player
3	DF	NOR	Isak Scheel (at Bærum)
6	MF	NGR	Effiom Otu Bassey (at Bukola Babes)
15	MF	NOR	Erik Midtgarden (at Mjøndalen)

No.	Pos.	Nation	Player
17	MF	NOR	Nicolay Solberg (at Sarpsborg 08)
24	DF	NOR	Marius Høibråten (at Strømmen)

=== Transfers ===
==== Winter ====
In: Note: Flags indicate national team as defined under FIFA eligibility rules; some limited exceptions apply. Players may hold more than one non-FIFA nationality.

No.	Pos.	Nation	Player
3	DF	NOR	Isak Scheel (from (Norway) Sogndal)
4	DF	NOR	Espen Nystuen (from (Norway) Sandefjord)
5	DF	SWE	Jesper Westerberg (from (Sweden) Mjällby)
7	FW	SWE	Johan Andersson (from (Norway) Stabæk)
10	MF	NOR	Petter Vaagan Moen (from (England) Queens Park Rangers)
12	GK	BIH	Sead Ramović (from (Serbia) Novi Pazar)
14	MF	ISL	Pálmi Rafn Pálmason (from (Norway) Stabæk)
15	DF	NOR	Erik Midtgarden (from (Netherlands) Vitesse Arnhem)
23	FW	ENG	Luke Rodgers (from (United States) New York Red Bulls)
25	MF	CMR	Guy Roger Toindouba (from (Tunisia) Espérance Sportive de Tunis)
27	DF	SWE	Fredrik Stoor (loan from (Norway) Vålerenga)

Out: Note: Flags indicate national team as defined under FIFA eligibility rules; some limited exceptions apply. Players may hold more than one non-FIFA nationality.

No.	Pos.	Nation	Player
—	MF	ISL	Stefán Gíslason (to (Belgium) OH Leuven)
23	DF	NOR	Pål Steffen Andresen (to (Norway) Ullensaker/Kisa)

==== Summer ====
In: Note: Flags indicate national team as defined under FIFA eligibility rules; some limited exceptions apply. Players may hold more than one non-FIFA nationality.

No.	Pos.	Nation	Player
1	GK	NOR	Lasse Staw (from (Norway) Syrianska)
6	MF	NOR	Espen Søgård (from (Norway) Start)
19	DF	NOR	Anders Østli (from (Norway) SønderjyskE)
22	FW	NOR	Thorstein Helstad (from (France) AS Monaco)

Out: Note: Flags indicate national team as defined under FIFA eligibility rules; some limited exceptions apply. Players may hold more than one non-FIFA nationality.

No.	Pos.	Nation	Player
3	DF	NOR	Isak Scheel (loan to Bærum)
8	FW	ISL	Björn Bergmann Sigurdarson (to (England) Wolverhampton Wanderers)
15	DF	NOR	Erik Midtgarden (loan to (Norway) Mjøndalen)
18	FW	NOR	Arild Sundgot (retired)
23	FW	ENG	Luke Rodgers (released, joined (England) Portsmouth)

== Competitions ==
=== Pre-season ===
3 February 2012	Lillestrøm	1–1	Strømsgodset	Lillestrøm
12:00		Summary		Stadium: Åråsen Stadion

7 February 2012	Lillestrøm	2–1	Strømmen	Lillestrøm
12:00		Summary		Stadium: Åråsen Stadion

11 February 2012	Lillestrøm	2–3	Hønefoss	Lillestrøm
14:00		Summary		Stadium: Åråsen Stadion

20 February 2012	Piast Gliwice (Poland)	3–2	(Norway) Lillestrøm	Gliwice
16:00		Summary		Stadium: Stadion Piast

=== Tippeligaen ===
==== Results summary ====
Overall								Home						Away					
Pld	W	D	L	GF	GA	GD	Pts	W	D	L	GF	GA	GD	W	D	L	GF	GA	GD
30	9	12	9	46	47	−1	39	3	8	4	23	19	+4	6	4	5	23	28	−5

==== Results by round ====
Round	1	2	3	4	5	6	7	8	9	10	11	12	13	14	15	16	17	18	19	20	21	22	23	24	25	26	27	28	29	30
Ground	A	H	A	H	A	H	A	H	A	H	H	A	H	A	H	A	H	A	H	A	H	A	A	H	A	H	A	H	A	H
Result	D	D	L	D	L	L	D	L	W	W	D	L	L	W	W	D	D	W	D	D	L	L	W	D	L	D	W	W	W	D
Position	10	11	15	13	15	15	15	15	14	14	14	14	15	14	12	13	13	11	11	11	12	12	12	12	12	12	11	10	9	9

Updated to match(es) played on 18 November 2012. Source: see below
A = Away; H = Home; W = Win; D = Draw; L = Loss

==== Results ====
24 March 2012 1	Hønefoss	0–0	Lillestrøm	Hønefoss
18:00	Groven (yellow card) 81'	Summary	Pálmason (yellow card) 50'; Moen (yellow card) 79'	Stadium: Aka Arena; Attendance: 3,512; Referee: Svein Moen

1 April 2012 2	Lillestrøm	2–2	Rosenborg	Lillestrøm
20:00	Andersson 7'; Rodgers 78'; Toindouba (yellow card) 80'	Summary	Iversen 11'; Issah (yellow card) 61'; Larsen (yellow card) 71'; Chibuike (yellow card) 80'; Dorsin 90+4'	Stadium: Åråsen Stadion; Attendance: 9,238; Referee: Brage Sandmoen

9 April 2012 3	Odd Grenland	2–0	Lillestrøm	Skien
16:00	Børven 12'; Eriksen 62'	Summary	Kippe (yellow card) 90+1'	Stadium: Skagerak Arena; Attendance: 3,518; Referee: Tommy Skjerven

15 April 2012 4	Lillestrøm	1–1	Vålerenga	Lillestrøm
20:00	Moen 38' (pen.); Toindouba (yellow card) 54'	Summary	Pusic 1'; Pedersen (yellow card) 33'; Hirschfeld (yellow card) 65'; Harmeet Singh (yellow card) 75'	Stadium: Åråsen Stadion; Attendance: 10,239; Referee: Espen Berntsen

23 April 2012 5	Molde	3–2	Lillestrøm	Molde
19:00	Angan 28'; Moström 85'; Chima 88'	Summary	Kippe (yellow card) 30' (goal) 66'; Pálmason 42'	Stadium: Aker Stadion; Attendance: 8,614; Referee: Svein Moen

28 April 2012 6	Lillestrøm	0–1	Strømsgodset	Lillestrøm
16:00	Knudtzon (yellow card) 7'	Summary	Adjei-Boateng (yellow card) 8'; Diomande 25' (yellow card) 76'	Stadium: Åråsen Stadion; Attendance: 6,245; Referee: Tom Hagen

6 May 2012 7	Haugesund	1–1	Lillestrøm	Haugesund
18:00	Sema 57'	Summary	Sigurdarson 35'	Stadium: Haugesund Stadion; Attendance: 4,646; Referee: Kjetil Saelen

13 May 2012 8	Lillestrøm	3–4	Brann	Lillestrøm
20:00	Sigurdarson 41' (pen.), 43', 51' (yellow card) 66'; Ringstad (yellow card) 64'	Summary	Akabueze 9', 32', 44'; Mjelde 49'	Stadium: Åråsen Stadion; Attendance: 5,885; Referee: Brage Sandmoen

16 May 2012 9	Viking	1–2	Lillestrøm	Stavanger
18:00	Bjorn Andersson 68' (yellow card) 90+3'; Anier (yellow card) 69'	Summary	Sigurdarson 3', 65' (yellow card) 69'; Kippe (yellow card) 51'; Toindouba (yellow card) 72'; Knudtzon (yellow card) 84'; Andersson (yellow card) 90+3'	Stadium: Viking stadion Attendance: 10,561; Referee: Tom Hagen

20 May 2012 10	Lillestrøm	1–0	Sogndal	Lillestrøm
18:00	Westerberg (yellow card) 63'; Sigurdarson 90'	Summary	Badji (yellow card) 3'	Stadium: Åråsen Stadion; Attendance: 5,155; Referee: Dag Hafsås

24 May 2012 11	Lillestrøm	0–0	Aalesund	Lillestrøm
19:00	Westerberg (yellow card) 47'	Summary	Vile Jalasto (yellow card) 90'	Stadium: Åråsen Stadion; Attendance: 5,171; Referee: Svein Moen

28 May 2012 12	Stabæk	4–1	Lillestrøm	Bærum
18:00	Aase 3'; Brustad 15', 16'; Vegar Hedenstad 19'; Hammer (yellow card) 90+1'	Summary	Knudtzon 10'; Westerberg (yellow card) 43'; Andersson (yellow card) 76'	Stadium: Nadderud Stadion; Attendance: 4,001; Referee: Svein Edvartsen

30 June 2012 13	Lillestrøm	1–3	Sandnes Ulf	Lillestrøm
18:00	Knudtzon 54'; Stoor (yellow card) 69'; Toindouba (yellow card) 72'	Summary	Kamal Saaliti 9'; Þorsteinsson 15'; Pepa (yellow card) 30'; Skjølsvik (yellow card) 36'; Gilles M'Bang Ondo 65'; Aanestad (yellow card) 75'	Stadium: Åråsen Stadion; Attendance: 4,507; Referee: Svein Edvartsen

9 July 2012 14	Fredrikstad	3–4	Lillestrøm	Fredrikstad
19:00	Tarik Elyounoussi (yellow card) 40' (goal) 45'; Bemjamin Hagen 48'; Etzaz Hussain 60'; Simen Rafn (yellow card) 71'; Horn (yellow card) 82'	Summary	Knudtzon 32', 34'; Moen 53'; Pálmason 58'	Stadium: Fredrikstad Stadion; Attendance: 8,982; Referee: Svein Moen

13 July 2012 15	Lillestrøm	4–2	Tromsø	Lillestrøm
19:00	Moen (yellow card) 45'; Knudtzon 50'; Omoijuanfo 52'; Toindouba 64'; Pálmason 74'	Summary	Norbye 11'; Nystrøm 48'	Stadium: Åråsen Stadion; Attendance: 4,597; Referee: Tom Hagen

23 July 2012 16	Rosenborg	1–1	Lillestrøm	Trondheim
19:00	Rønning 55' (yellow card) 58'; Høiland (yellow card) 61'	Summary	Moen 14'; Andersson (yellow card) 22'; Omoijuanfo (yellow card) 38'; Toindouba (yellow card) 40'	Stadium: Lerkendal Stadion; Attendance: 13,696; Referee: Ken Henry Johnsen

28 July 2012 17	Lillestrøm	1–1	Molde	Lillestrøm
18:00	Westerberg (yellow card) 12'; Nystuen 89'	Summary	Simonsen 34' (yellow card) 56'; Eikrem (yellow card) 89'	Stadium: Åråsen Stadion; Attendance: 5,188; Referee: Kristoffer Helgerud

5 August 2012 18	Sandnes Ulf	0–1	Lillestrøm	Sandnes
18:00		Summary	Pálmason (yellow card) 37'; Kippe 40' (yellow card) 88'	Stadium: Sandnes Idrettspark; Attendance: 3,405; Referee: Dag Hafsås

12 August 2012 19	Lillestrøm	2–2	Hønefoss	Lillestrøm
18:00	Knudtzon 50'; Kippe (yellow card) 81'; Andersson 90+1'	Summary	Sigurðsson 15'; Rune Bolseth (yellow card) 42'; Riski 64'	Stadium: Åråsen Stadion; Attendance: 5,451; Referee: Trygve Kjensli

25 August 2012 20	Strømsgodset	3–3	Lillestrøm	Drammen
16:00	Madsen (yellow card) 23'; Kovács (yellow card) 31' (goal) 42', 64'; Kwarasey (yellow card) 69'; Kamara 76' (pen.); Sætra (yellow card) 87'	Summary	Helstad 47'; Knudtzon 54'; Stoor (yellow card) 59'; Riise 70' (pen.); Moen (yellow card) 75'	Stadium: Marienlyst Stadion; Attendance: 6,420; Referee: Tom Hagen

1 September 2012 21	Lillestrøm	1–2	Fredrikstad	Lillestrøm
18:00	Søgård (yellow card) 1'; Helstad 52'	Summary	Tripić (yellow card) 27' (goal) 57'; Pusic 87' (pen.)	Stadium: Åråsen Stadion; Attendance: 5,159; Referee: Espen Berntsen

17 September 2012 22	Tromsø	5–1	Lillestrøm	Tromsø
19:00	Björck 23', 57'; Bendiksen 27'; Ondrášek 53', 60'	Summary	Moen 38' (yellow card) 86'	Stadium: Alfheim Stadion; Attendance: 4,085; Referee: Svein Moen

22 September 2012 23	Aalesund	1–2	Lillestrøm	Ålesund
18:00	Arnefjord (yellow card) 38'; Ulvestad 83'	Summary	Pálmason (yellow card) 32'; Riise 39'; Bolly 62'; Stoor (yellow card) 90+3'	Stadium: Color Line Stadion; Attendance: 8,970; Referee: Dag Hafsås

29 September 2012 24	Lillestrøm	0–0	Viking	Lillestrøm
18:00	Hauger (yellow card) 51'; Kippe (yellow card) 70'	Summary	Ørnskov (yellow card) 90+2'	Stadium: Åråsen Stadion; Attendance: 4,723; Referee: Tom Hagen

7 October 2012 25	Sogndal	1–0	Lillestrøm	Sogndalsfjøra
18:00	Mane 90+4'	Summary		Stadium: Fosshaugane Campus; Attendance: 3,545; Referee: Per Staberg

20 October 2012 26	Lillestrøm	1–1	Odd Grenland	Lillestrøm
18:00	Moen 38'; Nystuen (yellow card) 90+5'	Summary	Dag Alexander Olsen 88' (yellow card) 90+4'	Stadium: Åråsen Stadion; Attendance: 4,376; Referee: Tommy Skjerven

29 October 2012 27	Brann	2–3	Lillestrøm	Bergen
19:00 CET (UTC+01)	Huseklepp 12', 45+1' (pen.); Ojo (yellow card) 64'; Korcsmár (yellow card) 82'	Summary	Bolly 7', 66'; Hauger (yellow card) 45'; Knudtzon (yellow card) 62'; Østli 83'	Stadium: Brann Stadion; Attendance: 10,648; Referee: Kristoffer Helgerud

4 November 2012 28	Lillestrøm	6–0	Stabæk	Lillestrøm
18:00 CET (UTC+01)	Moen 22'; Helstad 52'; Pálmason 76', 79'; Bolly 88'; Gulbrandsen 90'	Summary		Stadium: Åråsen Stadion; Attendance: 4,569; Referee: Tore Hansen

11 November 2012 29	Vålerenga	1–2	Lillestrøm	Oslo
18:00 CET (UTC+01)	Ringstad 47' (o.g.)	Summary	Knudtzon 33'; Pálmason 68'	Stadium: Ullevaal Stadion; Attendance: 12,075; Referee: Tom Hagen

18 November 2012 30	Lillestrøm	0–0	Haugesund	Lillestrøm
18:00		Summary		Stadium: Åråsen Stadion; Attendance: 4,886; Referee: Trygve Kjensli

==== Table ====
Pos	Team	Pld	W	D	L	GF	GA	GD	Pts
7	Haugesund	30	11	9	10	46	40	+6	42
8	Vålerenga	30	12	5	13	42	44	−2	41
9	Lillestrøm	30	9	12	9	46	47	−1	39
10	Odd Grenland	30	11	7	12	40	43	−3	39 (Note: Odd Grenland were deducted 1 point for lack of financial control)
11	Aalesund	30	9	11	10	40	41	−1	38

Source: fotball.no
Rules for classification: 1) points; 2) goal difference; 3) number of goals scored.

=== Norwegian Cup ===
1 May 2012 First Round	Skjetten	0–8	Lillestrøm	Skjetten
18:00		Summary	Pálmason 12'; Toindouba 26'; Sigurdarson 45+1', 52', 73', 82'; Knudtzon 51'; Gabrielsen 90'	Stadium: Skjetten Stadion; Attendance: 2,000; Referee: Sigurd Kringstad

9 May 2012 Second Round	Ottestad	0–2	Lillestrøm	Ottestad
18:00		Summary	Kippe 13', 29'; Nystuen (yellow card) 85'	Stadium: Ottestad Idrettspark; Attendance: 1,250; Referee: Kristoffer Leirdal

20 June 2012 Third Round	Ullensaker/Kisa	0–3	Lillestrøm	Jessheim
18:00	Andresen (yellow card) 89'	Summary	Sigurðarson 12'; Pálmason (yellow card) 15'; Tom Kristoffersen 39' (o.g.); Omoijuanfo 77'	Stadium: UKI Arena; Attendance: 3,240; Referee: Brage Sandmoen

4 July 2012 Fourth Round	Bodø/Glimt	4–0	Lillestrøm	Bodø
18:00	Erlend Robertsen 11'; Vieux Sané 15' (yellow card) 79'; Thomas Braaten (yellow card) 64'; Ulrik Berglann 86'; Knarvik 89'	Summary	Toindouba (yellow card) 45'	Stadium: Aspmyra Stadion; Attendance: 2,368; Referee: Kristoffer Helgerud

== Squad statistics ==
=== Appearances and goals ===
No.	Pos	Nat	Player	Total		Tippeligaen		Norwegian Football Cup	
No.	Pos	Nat	Player	Apps	Goals	Apps	Goals	Apps	Goals
1	GK	(Norway) NOR	Lasse Staw	2	0	2+0	0	0+0	0
4	DF	(Norway) NOR	Espen Nystuen	20	1	15+3	1	2+0	0
5	DF	(Sweden) SWE	Jesper Westerberg	15	0	10+2	0	2+1	0
6	MF	(Norway) NOR	Espen Søgård	4	0	1+3	0	0+0	0
7	FW	(Sweden) SWE	Johan Andersson	29	2	19+8	2	2+0	0
8	MF	(Norway) NOR	Bjørn Helge Riise	11	2	11+0	2	0+0	0
9	FW	(Norway) NOR	Fredrik Gulbrandsen	11	1	3+7	1	1+0	0
10	MF	(Norway) NOR	Petter Vaagan Moen	27	7	23+0	7	4+0	0
11	MF	(Norway) NOR	Erling Knudtzon	33	9	25+4	8	4+0	1
12	GK	(Bosnia and Herzegovina) BIH	Sead Ramović	28	0	26+0	0	2+0	0
13	DF	(Norway) NOR	Frode Kippe	26	4	21+1	2	4+0	2
14	MF	(Iceland) ISL	Pálmi Rafn Pálmason	32	8	27+1	6	4+0	2
16	FW	(Norway) NOR	Ohi Omoijuanfo	19	1	12+5	1	0+2	0
19	DF	(Norway) NOR	Anders Østli	13	1	13+0	1	0+0	0
20	DF	(Norway) NOR	Stian Ringstad	24	0	14+6	0	4+0	0
21	FW	(Ivory Coast) CIV	Moryké Fofana	2	0	0+2	0	0+0	0
22	FW	(Norway) NOR	Thorstein Helstad	12	3	10+2	3	0+0	0
23	MF	(Norway) NOR	Henning Hauger	9	0	8+1	0	0+0	0
25	MF	(Cameroon) CMR	Guy Toindouba	22	2	12+6	1	3+1	1
26	MF	(Norway) NOR	Mathis Bolly	28	4	13+11	4	2+2	0
27	DF	(Sweden) SWE	Fredrik Stoor	23	0	21+0	0	2+0	0
25	MF	(Norway) NOR	Ruben Gabrielsen	19	1	13+3	0	0+3	1
29	GK	(Norway) NOR	Jakob Faye-Lund	3	0	0+2	0	1+0	0
29	FW	(Norway) NOR	Joachim Osvold	3	0	0+3	0	0+0	0
	GK	(Iceland) ISL	Stefán Logi Magnússon	3	0	2+0	0	1+0	0
Players away from Lillestrøm on loan:
3	DF	(Norway) NOR	Isak Scheel	6	0	4+0	0	2+0	0
Players who appeared for Lillestrøm no longer at the club:
2	DF	(Norway) NOR	Steinar Pedersen	14	0	11+1	0	0+2	0
8	FW	(Iceland) ISL	Björn Bergmann Sigurdarson	17	12	13+0	7	4+0	5
23	FW	(England) ENG	Luke Rodgers	7	1	1+6	1	0+0	0

=== Goal scorers ===
Place	Position	Nation	Number	Name	Tippeligaen	Norwegian Cup	Total
1	FW	(Iceland)	8	Björn Bergmann Sigurdarson	7	5	12
2	MF	(Norway)	11	Erling Knudtzon	8	1	9
3	MF	(Iceland)	14	Pálmi Rafn Pálmason	6	2	8
4	MF	(Norway)	10	Petter Vaagan Moen	6	0	6
5	MF	(Norway)	26	Mathis Bolly	4	0	4
5	DF	(Norway)	13	Frode Kippe	2	2	4
7	FW	(Norway)	22	Thorstein Helstad	3	0	3
8	FW	(Sweden)	7	Johan Andersson	2	0	2
8	MF	(Norway)	8	Bjørn Helge Riise	2	0	2
8	MF	(Cameroon)	25	Guy Toindouba	1	1	2
8	MF	(Norway)	28	Ruben Gabrielsen	1	1	2
12	FW	(Norway)	16	Ohi Omoijuanfo	1	0	1
12	DF	(Norway)	4	Espen Nystuen	1	0	1
12	DF	(Norway)	19	Anders Østli	1	0	1
12	FW	(England)	23	Luke Rodgers	1	0	1
12				Own goal	0	1	1
				TOTALS	46	13	59

=== Disciplinary record ===
Number	Nation	Position	Name	Tippeligaen		Norwegian Cup		Total	
Number	Nation	Position	Name	Yellow card	Red card	Yellow card	Red card	Yellow card	Red card
4	(Norway)	DF	Espen Nystuen	2	0	1	0	3	0
5	(Sweden)	DF	Jesper Westerberg	4	0	0	0	4	0
6	(Norway)	MF	Espen Søgård	1	0	0	0	1	0
7	(Sweden)	MF	Johan Andersson	3	0	0	0	3	0
8	(Iceland)	FW	Björn Bergmann Sigurdarson	3	0	0	0	3	0
10	(Norway)	MF	Petter Vaagan Moen	5	0	0	0	5	0
11	(Norway)	MF	Erling Knudtzon	3	0	0	0	3	0
12	(Bosnia and Herzegovina)	GK	Sead Ramović	1	0	0	0	1	0
13	(Norway)	DF	Frode Kippe	6	0	0	0	6	0
14	(Iceland)	MF	Pálmi Rafn Pálmason	3	0	1	0	4	0
16	(Norway)	FW	Ohi Omoijuanfo	1	0	0	0	1	0
20	(Norway)	DF	Stian Ringstad	1	0	0	0	1	0
23	(Norway)	MF	Henning Hauger	3	0	0	0	3	0
25	(Cameroon)	MF	Guy Toindouba	5	0	1	0	6	0
26	(Norway)	MF	Mathis Bolly	1	0	0	0	1	0
27	(Sweden)	DF	Fredrik Stoor	5	0	0	0	5	0
29	(Norway)	GK	Jakob Faye-Lund	1	0	0	0	1	0
			TOTALS	48	0	3	0	51	0
