= 2013 Lillestrøm SK season =

Lillestrøm
2013 season
- Chairman: Øystein Neerland
- Manager: Magnus Haglund
- Stadium: Åråsen Stadion
- Tippeligaen: 10th
- Norwegian Cup: Semi-final vs Molde
- Top goalscorer: League: Petter Vaagan Moen (8); All: Petter Vaagan Moen (12)
- Highest home attendance: 9,766 vs Vålerenga; 30 June 2013
- Lowest home attendance: 1,712 vs Bryne; 18 March 2013
- Average home league attendance: 5,316

The 2013 season was Lillestrøm's 37th consecutive year in Tippeligaen and their second with Magnus Haglund as manager. They finished 10th in the league and were knocked out of the cup at the Semi-Final stage by Molde.

== Season summary ==
The club has had mixed results in the early season, disappointingly drawing with Sarpsborg 08 at home before beating defending champions Molde away from home. Following a 0-1 defeat at Åråsen Stadion to Viking, LSK however beat Brann at home to clinch just the fourth win for Magnus Haglund in 17 home games since March 2012. A decent early season was however offset by a dramatic drop in form from the second half of April through May.

Barring a 3-2 win against Start, the team underperformed and won just one out of seven games before a 3-0 home victory against Haugesund in the final match before the summer break. Notably, LSK's defence leaked an incredible 16 goals in five matches after losing club captain Frode Kippe to injury in the Start match.

Lillestrøm's Swedish coach has been under heavy pressure in the first half of the season, following disappointing results and speculation that club legend Ståle Solbakken might be tempted to take over the reins. Lillestrøm's dwindling attendances under Magnus Haglund reached a low point in the home match against Haugesund. The attendance in that match was just 4,106. Attendance-wise, LSK are at a low ebb with an average attendance of just 5,252. The highest average attendance in recent history was 9,018 in the 2007 season. At the time of the summer break, LSK are 9th in the Tippeligaen.

Lillestrøm qualified for the fourth round of the Norwegian Cup after beating 2nd division outfit Kvik Halden 2-0 on 30 May. In earlier rounds, LSK beat Skedsmo of the division III 4-0 in the 1st round of the cup, then ousted Grorud (division II) 4-2 after extra time in the 2nd round.

== Squad ==
As of 19 July 2013

Note: Flags indicate national team as defined under FIFA eligibility rules; some limited exceptions apply. Players may hold more than one non-FIFA nationality.

No.	Pos.	Nation	Player
1	GK	NOR	Kenneth Udjus
2	DF	NOR	Anders Østli
3	DF	NOR	Isak Scheel
4	MF	NOR	Ruben Gabrielsen
5	DF	NOR	Simen Nordermoen
6	DF	AUT	Thomas Piermayr
7	FW	SWE	Johan Andersson
8	MF	NOR	Bjørn Helge Riise
10	MF	NOR	Petter Vaagan Moen (vice-captain)
11	MF	NOR	Erling Knudtzon
12	GK	NOR	Jon Knudsen
13	DF	NOR	Frode Kippe (captain)
14	MF	ISL	Pálmi Rafn Pálmason

No.	Pos.	Nation	Player
15	DF	NOR	Magnar Ødegaard (loan from Molde)
16	MF	NOR	Ohi Omoijuanfo
17	MF	NOR	Erik Mjelde
18	MF	NOR	Markus Furseth
19	FW	NOR	Joachim Osvold
20	DF	NOR	Stian Ringstad
21	FW	CIV	Moryké Fofana
22	FW	NOR	Thorstein Helstad
23	FW	NGR	Fred Friday
24	DF	NOR	Marius Høibråten
27	DF	SWE	Fredrik Stoor
29	GK	NOR	Jacob Faye-Lund
77	GK	KEN	Arnold Origi

== Transfers ==
=== Winter ===
In: Note: Flags indicate national team as defined under FIFA eligibility rules; some limited exceptions apply. Players may hold more than one non-FIFA nationality.

No.	Pos.	Nation	Player
12	GK	NOR	Kenneth Udjus (from (Norway) Sogndal)
24	DF	NOR	Marius Høibråten
27	DF	NOR	Fredrik Stoor (from (Norway) Vålerenga, previously on loan)
29	GK	KEN	Arnold Origi (from (Norway) Ull/Kisa)

Out: Note: Flags indicate national team as defined under FIFA eligibility rules; some limited exceptions apply. Players may hold more than one non-FIFA nationality.

No.	Pos.	Nation	Player
1	GK	NOR	Lasse Staw (to (Norway) Aalesunds)
4	DF	NOR	Espen Nystuen (to (Norway) Kongsvinger)
6	MF	NOR	Espen Søgård (to (Norway) Fet)
12	GK	BIH	Sead Ramović
23	MF	NOR	Henning Hauger (loan return to (Germany) Hannover 96)
25	MF	CMR	Guy Toindouba (to (Turkey) Adana Demirspor)
26	MF	NOR	Mathis Bolly (to (Germany) Fortuna Düsseldorf)
—	MF	NGR	Effiom Otu Bassey (loan to (Nigeria) Bukola Babes)
—	GK	ISL	Stefán Logi Magnússon (loan to (Norway) Ull/Kisa)

=== Summer ===
In: Note: Flags indicate national team as defined under FIFA eligibility rules; some limited exceptions apply. Players may hold more than one non-FIFA nationality.

No.	Pos.	Nation	Player
6	DF	AUT	Thomas Piermayr (from (Austria) Wiener Neustadt)
12	GK	NOR	Jon Knudsen (from retirement, on short term contract)
15	DF	NOR	Magnar Ødegaard (loan from (Norway) Molde)
23	FW	NGR	Fred Friday

Out: Note: Flags indicate national team as defined under FIFA eligibility rules; some limited exceptions apply. Players may hold more than one non-FIFA nationality.

No.	Pos.	Nation	Player
9	FW	NOR	Fredrik Gulbrandsen (to (Norway) Molde)

== Competitions ==
=== Friendlies ===
18 January 2013	Lillestrøm	3–1	Strømsgodset	Lillestrøm
12:00 CET (UTC+1)	Gulbrandsen 7'; Knudtzon 32'; J.Osvold 87'	Summary	Vilsvik 53'	Stadium: LSK-Hallen

26 January 2013	Lillestrøm	1–1	Sarpsborg 08	Lillestrøm
14:00 CET (UTC+1)	Gulbrandsen 33'	Report	Hoås 65'	Stadium: LSK-Hallen

1 February 2013	Lillestrøm (Norway)	1–3	(Sweden) Brommapojkarna	Lillestrøm
16:00 CET (UTC+1)	Riise 55'	Report	Albornoz 43'; Eriksson 47'; 52'	Stadium: LSK-Hallen

7 February 2013	Lillestrøm (Norway)	3–2	(Sweden) Häcken	Lillestrøm
14:00 CET (UTC+1)	Mohammed 8' (o.g.); Pálmason 53'; Riise 78'	Report	12'; Makondele 61' (pen.)	Stadium: LSK-Hallen

11 February 2013	Lillestrøm (Norway)	1–0	(Romania) Astra Giurgiu	Lillestrøm
16:00 CET (UTC+1)	Helstad 85'	Report		Stadium: LSK-Hallen

14 February 2013	Lillestrøm (Norway)	0–2	(Russia) CSKA Moscow	Lillestrøm
15:00 CET (UTC+1)		Report	Origi 14' (o.g.); Vágner Love 67'	Stadium: LSK-Hallen

18 February 2013	Lillestrøm (Norway)	2–1	(Norway) Start	Lillestrøm
15:00 CET (UTC+1)	Gulbrandsen 1'; Fofana 80'	Report	Castro 77'	Stadium: LSK-Hallen

26 February 2013	Lillestrøm (Norway)	0–4	(Norway) Vålerenga	Lillestrøm
12:00 CET (UTC+1)		Report	Holm 19'; Børven 49'; Anene 67'; Ringstad 79' (o.g.)	Stadium: LSK-Hallen

2 March 2013	Lillestrøm (Norway)	1–2	(Norway) Ullensaker/Kisa	Lillestrøm
14:00 CET (UTC+1)		[Report]		Stadium: LSK-Hallen

8 March 2013	Hønefoss (Norway)	1–0	(Norway) Lillestrøm	Hønefoss
18:00 CET (UTC+1)		Summary		Stadium: Aka Arena

14 June 2013	Häcken (Sweden)	5–2	(Norway) Lillestrøm	Gothenburg
14:00 CEST (UTC+2)		Summary		Stadium: Rambergsvallen

=== Tippeligaen ===
==== Results summary ====
Overall								Home						Away					
Pld	W	D	L	GF	GA	GD	Pts	W	D	L	GF	GA	GD	W	D	L	GF	GA	GD
30	10	9	11	37	44	−7	39	6	5	4	23	19	+4	4	4	7	14	25	−11

==== Results by round ====
Round	1	2	3	4	5	6	7	8	9	10	11	12	13	14	15	16	17	18	19	20	21	22	23	24	25	26	27	28	29	30
Ground	H	A	H	H	A	H	A	H	A	H	A	H	A	H	A	A	H	A	A	H	A	H	A	H	A	H	A	H	A	H
Result	D	W	L	W	L	W	L	D	L	D	L	W	L	L	L	W	W	D	D	D	D	W	W	L	D	D	L	W	L	L
Position	7	3	8	5	7	6	6	7	10	10	12	9	11	13	14	12	10	10	10	12	11	9	8	8	9	9	9	9	9	10

Updated to match(es) played on 14 November 2013. Source: see below
A = Away; H = Home; W = Win; D = Draw; L = Loss

==== Fixtures ====
17 March 2013 1	Lillestrøm	2–2	Sarpsborg 08	Lillestrøm
15:30 CET (UTC+1)	Moen 62' (pen.); Helstad 65'	Summary	Elyounoussi 7', 60'	Stadium: Åråsen Stadion; Attendance: 4,789; Referee: Ken Henry Johnsen

2 April 2013 2	Molde	1–2	Lillestrøm	Molde
18:30 CEST (UTC+2)	Toivio 70'	Summary	Moen 13'; Kippe 77'	Stadium: Aker Stadion; Attendance: 7,981; Referee: Trygve Kjensli

7 April 2013 3	Lillestrøm	0–1	Viking	Lillestrøm
18:00 CEST (UTC+2)		Summary	Bjørdal 44'	Stadium: Åråsen Stadion; Attendance: 4,856; Referee: Dag Vidar Hafsås

14 April 2013 4	Lillestrøm	2–0	Brann	Lillestrøm
19:00 CEST (UTC+2)	Moen 58'; Helstad 62'	Summary		Stadium: Åråsen Stadion; Attendance: 4,637; Referee: Per Ivar Staberg

21 April 2013 5	Strømsgodset	1–0	Lillestrøm	Drammen
18:00 CEST (UTC+2)	Kovács 38'	Summary		Stadium: Marienlyst Stadion; Attendance: 6,465; Referee: Brage Sandmoen

27 April 2013 6	Lillestrøm	3–2	Start	Lillestrøm
15:30 CEST (UTC+2)	Pálmason 25'; Moen 54' (pen.); Helstad 56'	Summary	Castro 22'; Vilhjálmsson 41'; Sarr (yellow card) 47' (yellow-red card) 75'	Stadium: Åråsen Stadion; Attendance: 4,765; Referee: Anders Johansen

5 May 2013 7	Odd	2–1	Lillestrøm	Skien
15:30 CEST (UTC+2)	Johnsen 36'; Shala 74'	Summary	Moen 13'	Stadium: Skagerak Arena; Attendance: 4,466; Referee: Svein Oddvar Moen

9 May 2013 8	Lillestrøm	2–2	Sogndal	Lillestrøm
18:00 CEST (UTC+2)	Omoijuanfo 65'; Moen 74' (pen.)	Summary	Patronen 22'; Valsvik 37'; Patronen (yellow card) 73' (yellow-red card) 84'	Stadium: Åråsen Stadion; Attendance: 4,150; Referee: Trygve Kjensli

13 May 2013 9	Aalesund	7–1	Lillestrøm	Ålesund
18:30 CEST (UTC+2)	Scheel 2' (o.g.); James 41'; Ulvestad 45+2'; Carlsen 59'; Hamdallah 69' (pen.), 77', 82'	Summary	Omoijuanfo 6'	Stadium: Color Line Stadion; Attendance: 7,270; Referee: Ola Hobber Nilsen

16 May 2013 10	Lillestrøm	2–2	Sandnes Ulf	Lillestrøm
18:00 CEST (UTC+2)	Pálmason 29'; Omoijuanfo 46'	Summary	Helle 56'; Høiland 69'	Stadium: Åråsen Stadion; Attendance: 9,462; Referee: Tom Harald Hagen

21 May 2013 11	Hønefoss	1–0	Lillestrøm	Hønefoss
18:00 CEST (UTC+2)	Kaland 50'	Summary		Stadium: Aka Arena; Attendance: 2,623; Referee: Kjetil Sælen

26 May 2013 12	Lillestrøm	3–0	Haugesund	Lillestrøm
15:30 CEST (UTC+2)	Riise 3'; Gulbrandsen 63'; Knudtzon 88'	Summary		Stadium: Åråsen Stadion; Attendance: 4,106; Referee: Kristoffer Helgerud

22 June 2013 13	Tromsø	2–0	Lillestrøm	Tromsø
15:30 CEST (UTC+2)	Prijović 79' (yellow card) 79'; Bendiksen 90+1'	Summary		Stadium: Alfheim Stadion; Attendance: 4,018; Referee: Espen Berntsen

30 June 2013 14	Lillestrøm	0–1	Vålerenga	Lillestrøm
15:30 CEST (UTC+2)		Summary	González 56'	Stadium: Åråsen Stadion; Attendance: 9,766; Referee: Svein Moen

7 July 2013 15	Rosenborg	1–0	Lillestrøm	Trondheim
18:00 CEST (UTC+2)	Chibuike 64'	Summary		Stadium: Lerkendal Stadion; Attendance: 15,014; Referee: Kjetil Sælen

14 July 2013 16	Sarpsborg 08	0–1	Lillestrøm	Sarpsborg
18:00 CEST (UTC+2)		Summary	Gulbrandsen 75'	Stadium: Sarpsborg Stadion; Attendance: 3,887; Referee: Tom Harald Hagen

27 July 2013 17	Lillestrøm	2–0	Molde	Lillestrøm
18:00 CEST (UTC+2)	Riise 41'; Helstad 71'	Summary		Stadium: Åråsen Stadion; Attendance: 5,050; Referee: Dag Vidar Hafsås

3 August 2013 18	Viking	2–2	Lillestrøm	Stavanger
18:00 CEST (UTC+2)	Sulimani 56'; Ingelsten 72'	Summary	Knudtzon 29'; Pálmason 48'	Stadium: Viking Stadion; Attendance: 8,962; Referee: Brage Sandmoen

9 August 2013 19	Brann	1–1	Lillestrøm	Bergen
19:00 CEST (UTC+2)	Askar 82'	Summary	Riise 41'	Stadium: Brann Stadion; Attendance: 10,077; Referee: Tom Harald Hagen

19 August 2013 20	Lillestrøm	1–1	Strømsgodset	Lillestrøm
19:00 CEST (UTC+2)	Vilsvik 90+2'	Summary	Kamara 61'	Stadium: Åråsen Stadion; Attendance: 5,860; Referee: Tommy Skjerven

25 August 2013 21	Vålerenga	1–1	Lillestrøm	Oslo
18:00 CEST (UTC+2)	Børven 42'	Summary	Østli 12'	Stadium: Ullevaal Stadion; Attendance: 12,200; Referee: Dag Vidar Hafsås

31 August 2013 22	Lillestrøm	1–0	Odd	Lillestrøm
15:30 CEST (UTC+2)	Kippe (red card) 31'; Ødegaard 41'	Summary		Stadium: Åråsen Stadion; Attendance: 4,069; Referee: Brage Sandmoen

14 September 2013 23	Sogndal	1–2	Lillestrøm	Sogndalsfjøra
15:30 CEST (UTC+2)	Mane 22'	Summary	Moen 10'; Andersson 24'	Stadium: Fosshaugane Campus; Attendance: 2,942; Referee: Dag Vidar Hafsås

21 September 2013 24	Lillestrøm	1–2	Hønefoss	Lillestrøm
15:30 CEST (UTC+2)	Kippe 15'	Summary	Vendelbo 51'; Riski 54'	Stadium: Åråsen Stadion; Attendance: 4,052; Referee: Svein Erik Edvartsen

29 September 2013 25	Sandnes Ulf	1–1	Lillestrøm	Sandnes
18:00 CEST (UTC+2)	Þorsteinsson 23'	Summary	Mjelde 90'	Stadium: Sandnes Idrettspark; Attendance: 3,100; Referee: Espen Berntsen

6 October 2013 26	Lillestrøm	1–1	Aalesund	Lillestrøm
18:00 CEST (UTC+2)	Helstad 74'	Summary	Arnefjord 65'	Stadium: Åråsen Stadion; Attendance: 4,065; Referee: Ola Nilsen

20 October 2013 27	Haugesund	3–2	Lillestrøm	Haugesund
18:00 CEST (UTC+2)	Haukås 8' (yellow card) 80'; Gytkjær 17'; Nilsen 53'; Andreassen (yellow card) 84'	Summary	Mjelde 23'; Kippe (yellow card) 36'; Moen 46'	Stadium: Haugesund Stadion; Attendance: 6,002; Referee: Kristoffer Helgerud

27 October 2013 28	Lillestrøm	3–2	Tromsø	Lillestrøm
15:30 CET (UTC+1)	Fojut 22' (o.g.); Riise 81', 90+3'	Summary	Andersen 26'; Ondrášek 45+1'	Stadium: Åråsen Stadion; Attendance: 4,548; Referee: Tore Hansen

3 November 2013 29	Start	1–0	Lillestrøm	Kristiansand
18:00 CET (UTC+1)	Mathisen 6'	Summary		Stadium: Sør Arena; Attendance: 6,380; Referee: Kristoffer Helgerund

10 November 2013 30	Lillestrøm	0–3	Rosenborg	Lillestrøm
18:00 CET (UTC+1)		Summary	Chibuike 7', 72'; Jensen 18'	Stadium: Åråsen Stadion; Attendance: 8,049; Referee: Espen Berntsen

==== Table ====
Pos	Team	Pld	W	D	L	GF	GA	GD	Pts
8	Brann	30	11	6	13	46	46	0	39
9	Start	30	10	8	12	43	46	−3	38
10	Lillestrøm	30	9	9	12	37	44	−7	36
11	Vålerenga	30	10	6	14	41	50	−9	36
12	Sogndal	30	8	9	13	33	48	−15	33

Source: fotball.no
Rules for classification: 1) points; 2) goal difference; 3) number of goals scored.

=== Norwegian Cup ===
17 April 2013 First Round	Skedsmo	0–4	Lillestrøm	Skedsmokorset
18:00 CEST (UTC+2)		Summary	Pálmason 1', 22'; Gulbrandsen 33', 65'	Stadium: Skedsmo stadion Attendance: 1,500; Referee: Per Erik Haugen

2 May 2013 Second Round	Grorud	2–4 (a.e.t.)	Lillestrøm	Oslo
18:00 CEST (UTC+2)	Hatlén 53'; Jensen 65'	Report	Riise 19'; Andersson 42'; Moen 117', 119'	Stadium: Grorud Matchbane; Attendance: 1,000; Referee: Mads Ahlsen

29 May 2013 Third Round	Kvik Halden	0–2	Lillestrøm	Halden
18:00 CEST (UTC+2)		Summary	Moen 55'; Østli 82'	Stadium: Halden stadion Attendance: 1,005; Referee: Espen Eskås

19 June 2013 Fourth Round	Lillestrøm	2–0 (a.e.t.)	Bryne	Lillestrøm
18:00 CEST (UTC+2)	Moen 100'; Fofana 118'	Report		Stadium: Åråsen Stadion; Attendance: 1,712; Referee: Kjetil Sælen

4 July 2013 Quarter-finals	Start	0–1	Lillestrøm	Kristiansand
19:00 CEST (UTC+2)		Summary	Pálmason 71'	Stadium: Sør Arena; Attendance: 4,135; Referee: Dag Vidar Hafsås

26 September 2013 Semi-finals	Lillestrøm	2–2 (a.e.t.) (4–5 p)	Molde	Lillestrøm
20:00 CEST (UTC+2)	Pálmason 30'; Østli 56'	Summary	Hoseth 34', 90+1'	Stadium: Åråsen Stadion; Attendance: 6,480; Referee: Tom Harald Hagen
	Penalties
	Moen (penalty scored); Riise (penalty scored); Helstad (penalty scored); Kippe (penalty scored); Piermayr (penalty missed)		(penalty scored) Hoseth; (penalty scored) Forren; (penalty scored) Hovland; (penalty scored) Høiland; (penalty scored) Hussain

== Squad statistics ==
As of 14 November 2013

=== Appearances and goals ===
No.	Pos	Nat	Player	Total		Tippeligaen		Norwegian Cup	
No.	Pos	Nat	Player	Apps	Goals	Apps	Goals	Apps	Goals
1	GK	(Norway) NOR	Kenneth Udjus	23	0	21+1	0	1+0	0
2	DF	(Norway) NOR	Anders Østli	35	3	30+0	1	5+0	2
3	DF	(Norway) NOR	Isak Scheel	6	0	3+1	0	2+0	0
5	DF	(Norway) NOR	Simen Nordermoen	1	0	0+1	0	0+0	0
6	DF	(Austria) AUT	Thomas Piermayr	10	0	3+6	0	0+1	0
7	FW	(Sweden) SWE	Johan Andersson	34	2	26+3	1	5+0	1
8	MF	(Norway) NOR	Bjørn Helge Riise	35	6	29+0	5	6+0	1
10	MF	(Norway) NOR	Petter Vaagan Moen	32	12	27+0	8	5+0	4
11	MF	(Norway) NOR	Erling Knudtzon	29	2	14+9	2	4+2	0
12	GK	(Norway) NOR	Jon Knudsen	2	0	0+0	0	2+0	0
13	DF	(Norway) NOR	Frode Kippe	29	2	24+0	2	5+0	0
14	MF	(Iceland) ISL	Pálmi Rafn Pálmason	36	7	29+1	3	6+0	4
15	DF	(Norway) NOR	Magnar Ødegaard	1	1	0+1	1	0+0	0
16	MF	(Norway) NOR	Ohi Omoijuanfo	24	3	5+14	3	2+3	0
17	MF	(Norway) NOR	Erik Mjelde	28	2	15+10	2	3+0	0
18	MF	(Norway) NOR	Markus Furseth	1	0	0+1	0	0+0	0
19	FW	(Norway) NOR	Joachim Osvold	3	0	0+2	0	0+1	0
20	DF	(Norway) NOR	Stian Ringstad	27	0	22+1	0	4+0	0
21	FW	(Ivory Coast) CIV	Moryké Fofana	31	1	14+11	0	2+4	1
22	FW	(Norway) NOR	Thorstein Helstad	25	5	16+6	5	1+2	0
23	FW	(Nigeria) NGR	Fred Friday	3	0	0+3	0	0+0	0
24	DF	(Norway) NOR	Marius Høibråten	12	0	9+1	0	1+1	0
27	DF	(Sweden) SWE	Fredrik Stoor	28	0	23+0	0	5+0	0
29	GK	(Norway) NOR	Jacob Faye-Lund	1	0	1+0	0	0+0	0
77	GK	(Kenya) KEN	Arnold Origi	13	0	8+2	0	3+0	0
Players away from Lillestrøm on loan:
Players who appeared for Lillestrøm no longer at the club:
6	MF	(Norway) NOR	Joakim Holmedal	1	0	1+0	0	0+0	0
9	FW	(Norway) NOR	Fredrik Gulbrandsen	20	4	9+6	2	5+0	2

=== Goal scorers ===
Place	Position	Nation	Number	Name	Tippeligaen	Norwegian Cup	Total
1	FW	(Norway)	10	Petter Vaagan Moen	8	4	12
2	MF	(Iceland)	14	Pálmi Rafn Pálmason	3	4	7
3	MF	(Norway)	8	Bjørn Helge Riise	5	1	6
4	FW	(Norway)	22	Thorstein Helstad	5	0	5
5	FW	(Norway)	9	Fredrik Gulbrandsen	2	2	4
6	MF	(Norway)	16	Ohi Omoijuanfo	3	0	3
6	DF	(Norway)	2	Anders Østli	1	2	3
8	MF	(Norway)	11	Erling Knudtzon	2	0	2
8	DF	(Norway)	13	Frode Kippe	2	0	2
8	MF	(Norway)	8	Erik Mjelde	2	0	2
8	FW	(Sweden)	7	Johan Andersson	1	1	2
12	DF	(Norway)	15	Magnar Ødegaard	1	0	1
12				Own goal	1	0	1
12	FW	(Ivory Coast)	21	Moryké Fofana	0	1	1
				TOTALS	37	15	52

=== Disciplinary record ===
Number	Nation	Position	Name	Tippeligaen		Norwegian Cup		Total	
Number	Nation	Position	Name	Yellow card	Red card	Yellow card	Red card	Yellow card	Red card
1	(Norway)	GK	Kenneth Udjus	2	0	0	0	2	0
2	(Norway)	DF	Anders Østli	2	0	1	0	3	0
7	(Sweden)	FW	Johan Andersson	2	0	0	0	2	0
8	(Norway)	MF	Bjørn Helge Riise	3	0	1	0	4	0
9	(Norway)	FW	Fredrik Gulbrandsen	1	0	1	0	2	0
10	(Norway)	MF	Petter Vaagan Moen	7	0	1	0	8	0
11	(Norway)	MF	Erling Knudtzon	1	0	0	0	1	0
13	(Norway)	DF	Frode Kippe	2	1	1	0	3	1
14	(Iceland)	MF	Pálmi Rafn Pálmason	2	0	0	0	2	0
17	(Norway)	MF	Erik Mjelde	3	0	0	0	3	0
21	(Ivory Coast)	FW	Moryké Fofana	1	0	1	0	2	0
24	(Norway)	DF	Marius Høibråten	1	0	0	0	1	0
27	(Sweden)	DF	Fredrik Stoor	3	0	0	0	3	0
77	(Kenya)	GK	Arnold Origi	1	0	0	0	1	0
			TOTALS	31	0	6	0	37	0
