= List of Norwegian football transfers winter 2011–12 =

The 2011–12 winter transfer window for Norwegian football transfers opened on 1 January and closed on 31 March 2012. Additionally, players without a club may join at any time. This list includes transfers featuring at least one Tippeligaen or Adeccoligaen club which are completed after the end of the summer 2011 transfer window and before the end of the 2011–12 winter window.

== Transfers ==
All players and clubs without a flag are Norwegian.

Date	Name	Moving from	Moving to	Fee
30 August 2011	Fredrik Nordkvelle	Strømsgodset	Brann	Free
31 August 2011	Martin Linnes	Kongsvinger	Molde	Free
31 August 2011	Daniel Berntsen	Bodø/Glimt	Rosenborg	
5 September 2011	Lars Kristian Eriksen	Lillestrøm	Odd Grenland	
16 September 2011	Mats Solheim	Sogndal	(Sweden) Kalmar	
5 October 2011	Håvard Storbæk	Odd Grenland	Haugesund	
10 October 2011	Michael Haukås	Bodø/Glimt	Haugesund	
1 November 2011	(Cameroon) Guy Roger Toindouba	(Tunisia) Espérance Sportive de Tunis	Lillestrøm	
14 December 2011	Erik Midtgarden	(Netherlands) Vitesse Arnhem	Lillestrøm	
8 November 2011	Ole Martin Årst	Start	Tromsø	Free
8 November 2011	Ola Hermann Opheim	Steinkjer	Molde	
9 November 2011	Martin Rønning Ovenstad	Mjøndalen	Strømsgodset	
10 November 2011	Isak Scheel	Sogndal	Lillestrøm	
14 November 2011	André Hanssen	Strømsgodset	Bodø/Glimt	Free
14 November 2011	Stian Sortevik	Hønefoss	Stabæk	
17 November 2011	(Bosnia and Herzegovina) Sead Ramović	(Serbia) FK Novi Pazar	Lillestrøm	
22 November 2011	Jørgen Skjelvik	Stabæk	(Sweden) Kalmar	Free
23 November 2011	(Sweden) Mikael Lustig	Rosenborg	(Scotland) Celtic	Free
25 November 2011	Tomasz Sokolowski	Viking	Brann	
28 November 2011	Anders Karlsen	Bodø/Glimt	Mjøndalen	
28 November 2011	Are Tronseth	Haugesund	Ranheim	
29 November 2011	(Iceland) Pálmi Rafn Pálmason	Stabæk	Lillestrøm	
30 November 2011	Yaw Amankwah	Brann	Sandefjord	
1 December 2011	Lars Stubhaug	Strømsgodset	Hønefoss	Free
6 December 2011	Victor Johansen	Vålerenga	Molde	
6 December 2011	(Sweden) Erdin Demir	(Sweden) Trelleborg	Brann	Undisclosed
6 December 2011	Christoffer Dahl	KFUM Oslo	Hønefoss	
14 December 2011	(Sweden) Johan Andersson	Stabæk	Lillestrøm	
14 December 2011	(Sweden) Jesper Westerberg	(Sweden) Mjällby	Lillestrøm	
16 December 2011	Avni Pepa	Start	Sandnes Ulf	Free
16 December 2011	Karl Morten Eek	Bodø/Glimt	(Sweden) Umeå	
22 December 2011	(Sweden) Andreas Landgren	(Italy) Udinese	Fredrikstad	
22 December 2011	(Denmark) Martin Jensen	Sandefjord	Fram Larvik	
23 December 2011	(Gabon) Gilles Mbang Ondo	Stabæk	Sandnes Ulf	Free
23 December 2011	Adem Güven	Kongsvinger	Odd Grenland	Free
28 December 2011	(Hungary) Péter Kovács	(Belgium) Lierse	Strømsgodset	Free
28 December 2011	Lars Iver Strand	Vålerenga	Strømsgodset	Free
1 January 2012	(New Zealand) Kris Bright	(Malta) Balzan Youths	Bryne FK	
1 January 2012	(Costa Rica) Celso Borges	Fredrikstad	(Sweden) AIK	
3 January 2012	Thomas Kind Bendiksen	(Scotland) Rangers	Tromsø	Free
3 January 2012	(Ivory Coast) Franck Boli	Unknown	Stabæk	
4 January 2012	(Costa Rica) Heiner Mora	(Costa Rica) Santos	Hønefoss	
5 January 2012	Martin Bjørnbak	Bodø/Glimt	Haugesund	Undisclosed
5 January 2012	(Finland) Riku Riski	(Poland) Widzew Łódź	Hønefoss	
5 January 2012	(Finland) Roope Riski	(Italy) Cesena	Hønefoss	Loan
6 January 2012	Even Hovland	Sogndal	Molde	NOK 8m
6 January 2012	(Sweden) Maic Sema	(Sweden) Hammarby	Haugesund	
6 January 2012	Abdurahim Laajaab	Strømmen	Vålerenga	
6 January 2012	(Nigeria) Leke James		Aalesund	
9 January 2012	(Senegal) Makhtar Thioune	Molde	(Germany) Karlsruher SC	Loan
10 January 2012	Morten Skjønsberg	Stabæk	(Sweden) Norrköping	
10 January 2012	Adnan Haidar	Vålerenga	Stabæk	
11 January 2012	Jo Sondre Aas	Ranheim	Sandefjord	
11 January 2012	(Iceland) Stefán Gíslason	Lillestrøm	(Belgium) OH Leuven	Free
12 January 2012	Tommy Knarvik	Viking	Bodø/Glimt	Free
13 January 2012	Krister Wemberg	Molde	Bodø/Glimt	Loan
14 January 2012	Thomas Holm	Molde	Fredrikstad	Free
16 January 2012	(Sweden) Markus Jonsson	(Greece) Panionios	Brann	Free
17 January 2012	Jon Knudsen	Stabæk	Fredrikstad	Free
17 January 2012	(Uruguay) Alejandro Lago	Rosenborg	(Uruguay) Montevideo Wanderers	Free
23 January 2012	Bjørnar Holmvik	Brann	Sandnes Ulf	Free
25 January 2012	(Finland) Hannu Patronen	(Sweden) Helsingborg	Sogndal	
26 January 2012	Morten Moldskred	Rosenborg	(Denmark) AGF Aarhus	Undisclosed
26 January 2012	(Costa Rica) Pablo Herrera	Aalesund	Unattched	
27 January 2012	Mostafa Abdellaoue	Vålerenga	(Denmark) F.C. Copenhagen	
28 January 2012	Mushaga Bakenga	Rosenborg	(Belgium) Club Brugge	
28 January 2012	Mats-Andre Kaland	Løv-Ham	Hønefoss	
31 January 2012	Mads Stokkelien	Start	Stabæk	Free
31 January 2012	(United States) Mix Diskerud	Stabæk	(Belgium) Gent	Loan
1 February 2012	Magnus Myklebust	Odd Grenland	Kongsvinger	Free
2 February 2012	Christer Kleiven	Start	Stabæk	
3 February 2012	(Senegal) Malick Mane	Sandefjord	Sogndal	Free
8 February 2012	Pål Steffen Andresen	Lillestrøm	Ullensaker/Kisa	Free
13 February 2012	Stefan Strandberg	Vålerenga	Rosenborg	Undisclosed
14 February 2012	Alain Junior Ollé Ollé	Stabæk	(Sweden) Åtvidaberg	Free
15 February 2012	Steffen Iversen	(England) Crystal Palace	Rosenborg	Free
15 February 2012	(Denmark) Martin Ørnskov	(Denmark) Silkeborg	Viking	Undisclosed
15 February 2012	Henrik Breimyr	(England) Aldershot Town	Viking	Loan
15 February 2012	(Faroe Islands) Jóan Símun Edmundsson	(England) Newcastle United	Viking	Free
16 February 2012	Bjarte Haugsdal	Brann	Stabæk	Free
16 February 2012	(Nigeria) Emmanuel Ekpo	(United States) Columbus Crew	Molde	Free
17 February 2012	(Iceland) Matthías Vilhjálmsson	(Iceland) FH Hafnarfjörður	Start	Loan
20 February 2012	Amin Askar	Fredrikstad	Brann	NOK 1m
20 February 2012	(Senegal) Oumar Niasse	(Senegal) US Ouakam	Brann	Loan
21 February 2012	Joachim Thomassen	Fredrikstad	Vålerenga	NOK 1m
21 February 2012	(Finland) Tomi Maanoja	(Finland) Honka	Sandefjord	Free
22 February 2012	(United States) Ricardo Clark	(Germany) Eintracht Frankfurt	Stabæk	Loan
22 February 2012	Marcus Pedersen	(Netherlands) Vitesse Arnhem	Vålerenga	Loan
24 February 2012	(Uruguay) Maxi Bajter	Brann	(Uruguay) C.A Fenix	Free
29 February 2012	Petter Vaagan Moen	(England) Queens Park Rangers	Lillestrøm	Free
2 March 2012	Simon Larsen	Vindbjart	Vålerenga	
5 March 2012	(Nigeria) Ahmed Suleiman	Unknown	Vålerenga	
5 March 2012	Tommy Høiland	Bryne	Sandnes Ulf	Free
5 March 2012	Mads Reginiussen	Tromsø	Ranheim	Free
6 March 2012	(Paraguay) Nery Cardozo	(Paraguay) Rubio Ñu	Viking	Loan
7 March 2012	(United States) Sean Cunningham	Molde	Stabæk	Loan
9 March 2012	Eirik Ulland Andersen	Haugesund	Vard Haugesund	Loan
15 March 2012	Espen Nystuen	Sandefjord	Lillestrøm	
15 March 2012	Rune Ertsås	(Denmark) Vejle	Alta	
15 March 2012	(Poland) Łukasz Jarosiński	Unknown	Alta	
18 March 2012	(Austria) Martin Pusic	Unattached	Vålerenga	
29 March 2012	Benjamin Stokke	Sandefjord	Mjøndalen	
31 March 2012	(England) Luke Rodgers	(United States) New York Red Bulls	Lillestrøm	
31 March 2012	(Sweden) Fredrik Stoor	Vålerenga	Lillestrøm	
date	(Lithuania) Tadas Labukas	Brann	Unattached	
date	(Uruguay) Diego Guastavino	Brann	Unattached	
