= List of Norwegian football transfers winter 2012–13 =

This is a list of Norwegian football transfers in the winter transfer window 2012–2013 by club. Only clubs of the 2013 Tippeligaen are included.

== 2013 Tippeligaen ==
=== Aalesund ===
In: Note: Flags indicate national team as defined under FIFA eligibility rules; some limited exceptions apply. Players may hold more than one non-FIFA nationality.

No.	Pos.	Nation	Player
1	GK	NOR	Lasse Staw (from Lillestrøm)
5	DF	NOR	Andreas Nordvik (from Vålerenga)
9	FW	MAR	Abderrazak Hamdallah (from OC Safi)
19	FW	NOR	Tor Hogne Aarøy (from JEF United)
19	FW	NOR	Kjell Rune Sellin (loan return from Hødd)
36	MF	NOR	Thomas Martinussen (promoted)
—	GK	NOR	Andreas Lie (from Odd)
—	FW	NOR	Didrik Fløtre (loan return from Kristiansund)

Out: Note: Flags indicate national team as defined under FIFA eligibility rules; some limited exceptions apply. Players may hold more than one non-FIFA nationality.

No.	Pos.	Nation	Player
1	GK	NOR	Ole-Christian Rørvik
2	DF	NOR	Amund Skiri (Retired)
9	FW	EST	Sander Post (to Flora Tallinn)
19	FW	NOR	Kjell Rune Sellin (to Sandefjord)
27	DF	EST	Enar Jääger
—	GK	NOR	Andreas Lie (loan to Hødd)

=== Brann ===
In: Note: Flags indicate national team as defined under FIFA eligibility rules; some limited exceptions apply. Players may hold more than one non-FIFA nationality.

No.	Pos.	Nation	Player
9	FW	AUT	Martin Pusic (from Fredrikstad)
11	FW	RUS	Vasili Pavlov (loan from Dacia Chișinău)
17	FW	SEN	Stéphane Badji (from Sogndal)
25	DF	NOR	Henrik Gjesdal
26	MF	NOR	Kasper Skaanes

Out: Note: Flags indicate national team as defined under FIFA eligibility rules; some limited exceptions apply. Players may hold more than one non-FIFA nationality.

No.	Pos.	Nation	Player
3	DF	NOR	Christian Kalvenes (Retired)
9	FW	NGR	Kim Ojo (to Genk)
10	MF	NOR	Erik Mjelde (to Lillestrøm)
11	FW	NGR	Bentley (to Wuhan Zall)
15	MF	NOR	Eirik Birkelund (to Saint-Étienne)

=== Haugesund ===
In: Note: Flags indicate national team as defined under FIFA eligibility rules; some limited exceptions apply. Players may hold more than one non-FIFA nationality.

No.	Pos.	Nation	Player
4	DF	DEN	Henrik Kildentoft (from Nordsjælland)
7	FW	DEN	Christian Gytkjær (from Nordsjælland)
12	GK	NOR	Olav Dalen (from Nybergsund)
23	MF	BRA	Daniel Bamberg (from Örebro)

Out: Note: Flags indicate national team as defined under FIFA eligibility rules; some limited exceptions apply. Players may hold more than one non-FIFA nationality.

No.	Pos.	Nation	Player
4	DF	CAN	Chris Pozniak (Retired)
6	MF	NOR	Håvard Storbæk (to Odd)
7	FW	NOR	Oddbjørn Skartun (to Bryne)
12	GK	NOR	Lars Øvernes (to HamKam)
44	FW	SRB	Nikola Đurđić (to SpVgg Greuther Fürth)
—	MF	BIH	Amer Osmanagić (released)

=== Hønefoss ===
In: Note: Flags indicate national team as defined under FIFA eligibility rules; some limited exceptions apply. Players may hold more than one non-FIFA nationality.

No.	Pos.	Nation	Player
3	MF	NOR	Pål Erik Ulvestad (loan from Molde)
5	DF	NOR	Aleksander Solli (from Vålerenga)
11	FW	NOR	Erik Midtgarden (from Lillestrøm)
20	FW	NOR	Alexander Mathisen (from Lierse)

Out: Note: Flags indicate national team as defined under FIFA eligibility rules; some limited exceptions apply. Players may hold more than one non-FIFA nationality.

No.	Pos.	Nation	Player
1	GK	NOR	Lars Stubhaug (to Strømsgodset)
5	DF	NOR	Vegar Gjermundstad (to Førde)
11	FW	NOR	Joachim Magnussen
17	MF	NOR	Leo Olsen (to Jevnaker)
18	MF	NOR	Rune Bolseth
20	MF	NOR	Mats André Kaland

=== Lillestrøm ===
In: Note: Flags indicate national team as defined under FIFA eligibility rules; some limited exceptions apply. Players may hold more than one non-FIFA nationality.

No.	Pos.	Nation	Player
12	GK	NOR	Kenneth Udjus (from Sogndal)
17	MF	NOR	Erik Mjelde (from Brann)
24	DF	NOR	Marius Høibråten
27	DF	NOR	Fredrik Stoor (from Vålerenga, previously on loan)
29	GK	KEN	Arnold Origi (from Ullensaker/Kisa)

Out: Note: Flags indicate national team as defined under FIFA eligibility rules; some limited exceptions apply. Players may hold more than one non-FIFA nationality.

No.	Pos.	Nation	Player
1	GK	NOR	Lasse Staw (to Aalesunds)
4	DF	NOR	Espen Nystuen (to Kongsvinger)
6	MF	NOR	Espen Søgård (to Fet)
12	GK	BIH	Sead Ramović
23	MF	NOR	Henning Hauger (loan return to Hannover 96)
25	MF	CMR	Guy Toindouba (to Adana Demirspor)
26	MF	NOR	Mathis Bolly (to Fortuna Düsseldorf)
—	MF	NGR	Effiom Otu Bassey (loan to Bukola Babes)
—	GK	ISL	Stefán Logi Magnússon (loan to Ullensaker/Kisa)

=== Molde ===
In: Note: Flags indicate national team as defined under FIFA eligibility rules; some limited exceptions apply. Players may hold more than one non-FIFA nationality.

No.	Pos.	Nation	Player
5	DF	FIN	Joona Toivio (from Djurgården)
17	FW	SEN	Aliou Coly (from Casa Sport)
20	FW	FIN	Lauri Dalla Valle (from Fulham)
21	FW	BRA	Agnaldo Moares (loan from Desportivo Brasil)
26	GK	NOR	Ørjan Nyland (from Hødd)
31	FW	USA	Ben Spencer (from Chivas USA)

Out: Note: Flags indicate national team as defined under FIFA eligibility rules; some limited exceptions apply. Players may hold more than one non-FIFA nationality.

No.	Pos.	Nation	Player
5	DF	NOR	Vegard Forren (to Southampton)
13	MF	NOR	Pål Erik Ulvestad (loan to Hønefoss)
15	MF	NOR	Magnus Stamnestrø (loan to Sogndal)
20	FW	CIV	Davy Claude Angan (to Hangzhou Greentown)
21	DF	NOR	Krister Wemberg (to Bryne)
28	DF	NOR	Simon Markeng (loan to Kristiansund)
29	FW	SEN	Pape Paté Diouf (loan return to Copenhagen)

=== Odd ===
In: Note: Flags indicate national team as defined under FIFA eligibility rules; some limited exceptions apply. Players may hold more than one non-FIFA nationality.

No.	Pos.	Nation	Player
6	MF	NOR	Christer Kleiven (from Stabæk)
22	MF	NOR	Håvard Storbæk (from Haugesund)

Out: Note: Flags indicate national team as defined under FIFA eligibility rules; some limited exceptions apply. Players may hold more than one non-FIFA nationality.

No.	Pos.	Nation	Player
6	MF	NOR	Simen Brenne (to Strømsgodset)
13	GK	NOR	Andreas Lie (to Aalesund)
16	MF	NOR	Alexandar Corovic
28	FW	NOR	Dag Alexander Olsen

=== Rosenborg ===
In: Note: Flags indicate national team as defined under FIFA eligibility rules; some limited exceptions apply. Players may hold more than one non-FIFA nationality.

No.	Pos.	Nation	Player
2	DF	CRC	Cristian Gamboa (from Copenhagen, previously on loan)
7	MF	DEN	Mike Jensen (from Brøndby)
9	FW	DEN	Nicki Bille Nielsen (from Villarreal)
11	FW	DEN	Tobias Mikkelsen (from Greuther Fürth)

Out: Note: Flags indicate national team as defined under FIFA eligibility rules; some limited exceptions apply. Players may hold more than one non-FIFA nationality.

No.	Pos.	Nation	Player
7	MF	GHA	Mohammed-Awal Issah (to Veria)
9	FW	SWE	Rade Prica (to Maccabi Tel Aviv)
11	FW	NOR	Steffen Iversen (Retired)
28	MF	NOR	Daniel Fredheim Holm (to Vålerenga)

=== Sandnes Ulf ===
In: Note: Flags indicate national team as defined under FIFA eligibility rules; some limited exceptions apply. Players may hold more than one non-FIFA nationality.

No.	Pos.	Nation	Player
2	DF	SWE	Johnny Lundberg (from Halmstad)
11	FW	CAN	Tosaint Ricketts (from Vålerenga)
15	DF	SRB	Miloš Mihajlov (from Zhetysu)
25	MF	SWE	Jakob Olsson (loan from GAIS)
27	FW	NOR	Zymer Bytyqi (loan from Red Bull Salzburg)
28	FW	SRB	Nemanja Jovanović (from Taraz)

Out: Note: Flags indicate national team as defined under FIFA eligibility rules; some limited exceptions apply. Players may hold more than one non-FIFA nationality.

No.	Pos.	Nation	Player

=== Sarpsborg 08 ===
In: Note: Flags indicate national team as defined under FIFA eligibility rules; some limited exceptions apply. Players may hold more than one non-FIFA nationality.

No.	Pos.	Nation	Player
5	MF	ISL	Þórarinn Ingi Valdimarsson (loan from ÍBV)
17	MF	ISL	Ásgeir Börkur Ásgeirsson (loan from Fylkir)
27	GK	JAM	Duwayne Kerr (from Strømmen)
69	DF	FRA	Jérémy Berthod (from Auxerre)

Out: Note: Flags indicate national team as defined under FIFA eligibility rules; some limited exceptions apply. Players may hold more than one non-FIFA nationality.

No.	Pos.	Nation	Player

=== Sogndal ===
In: Note: Flags indicate national team as defined under FIFA eligibility rules; some limited exceptions apply. Players may hold more than one non-FIFA nationality.

No.	Pos.	Nation	Player
—	MF	NOR	Magnus Stamnestrø (loan from Molde)

Out: Note: Flags indicate national team as defined under FIFA eligibility rules; some limited exceptions apply. Players may hold more than one non-FIFA nationality.

No.	Pos.	Nation	Player
—	GK	NOR	Kenneth Udjus (to Lillestrøm)
—	FW	SEN	Stéphane Badji (to Brann)

=== Start ===
In: Note: Flags indicate national team as defined under FIFA eligibility rules; some limited exceptions apply. Players may hold more than one non-FIFA nationality.

No.	Pos.	Nation	Player
6	MF	SEN	Babacar Sarr (from Selfoss)

Out: Note: Flags indicate national team as defined under FIFA eligibility rules; some limited exceptions apply. Players may hold more than one non-FIFA nationality.

No.	Pos.	Nation	Player
5	MF	NGR	Oladapo Olufemi (to Shooting Stars)
7	MF	NOR	Fredrik Strømstad (Retired)
15	GK	NOR	Arild Østbø (loan return to Viking)
20	FW	USA	Villyan Bijev (loan to Liverpool)
24	DF	NOR	Steinar Pedersen (Retired)

=== Strømsgodset ===
In: Note: Flags indicate national team as defined under FIFA eligibility rules; some limited exceptions apply. Players may hold more than one non-FIFA nationality.

No.	Pos.	Nation	Player
5	DF	NOR	Jørgen Horn (from Fredrikstad)
6	MF	NOR	Simen Brenne (from Odd Grenland)
14	MF	NOR	Iver Fossum
17	FW	NOR	Thomas Lehne Olsen
23	MF	NOR	Thomas Sørum (from Helsingborg)
—	GK	NOR	Lars Stubhaug (from Hønefoss)

Out: Note: Flags indicate national team as defined under FIFA eligibility rules; some limited exceptions apply. Players may hold more than one non-FIFA nationality.

No.	Pos.	Nation	Player
6	DF	NOR	Alexander Aas
11	FW	NOR	Ola Kamara (to 1860 München)
14	MF	NOR	Lars Iver Strand (to Sandefjord)
23	MF	NOR	Anders Konradsen (to Rennes)

=== Tromsø ===
In: Note: Flags indicate national team as defined under FIFA eligibility rules; some limited exceptions apply. Players may hold more than one non-FIFA nationality.

No.	Pos.	Nation	Player
3	DF	POL	Jarosław Fojut (from Śląsk Wrocław)
5	FW	NOR	Morten Moldskred (from AGF)
6	DF	NOR	Adnan Čaušević (from Vard Haugesund)
18	MF	WAL	Josh Pritchard (from Fulham)
33	MF	NOR	Lars Gunnar Johnsen

Out: Note: Flags indicate national team as defined under FIFA eligibility rules; some limited exceptions apply. Players may hold more than one non-FIFA nationality.

No.	Pos.	Nation	Player
2	MF	SEN	Kara Mbodj (from Genk)
3	DF	SWE	Fredrik Björck (from BK Häcken)
16	MF	NOR	Hans Åge Yndestad (Retired)
25	FW	NOR	Ole Martin Årst (Retired)
35	FW	FIN	Henri Sillanpää (to VPS)

=== Viking ===
In: Note: Flags indicate national team as defined under FIFA eligibility rules; some limited exceptions apply. Players may hold more than one non-FIFA nationality.

No.	Pos.	Nation	Player
5	DF	COD	Richard Ekunde (from GAIS)
11	FW	FRO	Jóan Símun Edmundsson (loan return from Fredericia)
12	GK	NOR	Arild Østbø (loan return from Start)
17	FW	NOR	Eirik Jakobsen (loan return from Bryne)
17	FW	ISL	Jón Daði Böðvarsson (from Selfoss)
22	GK	NOR	Christoffer Midbøe Lunde (from Vidar)

Out: Note: Flags indicate national team as defined under FIFA eligibility rules; some limited exceptions apply. Players may hold more than one non-FIFA nationality.

No.	Pos.	Nation	Player
4	DF	SWE	Björn Andersson (to GAIS)
10	FW	NOR	Erik Nevland (Retired)
17	FW	NOR	Eirik Jakobsen (to Bryne)
—	FW	EST	Henri Anier (on loan to Fredrikstad)

=== Vålerenga ===
In: Note: Flags indicate national team as defined under FIFA eligibility rules; some limited exceptions apply. Players may hold more than one non-FIFA nationality.

No.	Pos.	Nation	Player
5	DF	CZE	Jan Lecjaks (loan from Young Boys)
7	MF	NOR	Daniel Fredheim Holm (from Rosenborg)
8	MF	NOR	Jan Gunnar Solli (from New York Red Bulls)
19	MF	NOR	Christian Grindheim (loan from Copenhagen)
20	FW	NOR	Mustafa Abdellaoue (loan from Copenhagen)
22	FW	CRC	Diego Calvo (from Alajuelense)

Out: Note: Flags indicate national team as defined under FIFA eligibility rules; some limited exceptions apply. Players may hold more than one non-FIFA nationality.

No.	Pos.	Nation	Player
3	DF	NOR	Andreas Nordvik (to Aalesund)
5	DF	NOR	Aleksander Solli (to Hønefoss)
14	FW	BFA	Yssouf Koné (Released)
16	MF	SEN	Pape Maly Diamanka (loan return to Rayo Vallecano)
19	FW	USA	Chad Barrett (loan return to Los Angeles Galaxy)
25	FW	CAN	Tosaint Ricketts (to Sandnes Ulf)
—	DF	NOR	Fredrik Stoor (to Lillestrøm, previously on loan)
