= Fredrik Gulbrandsen =

Norwegian footballer (born 1992)

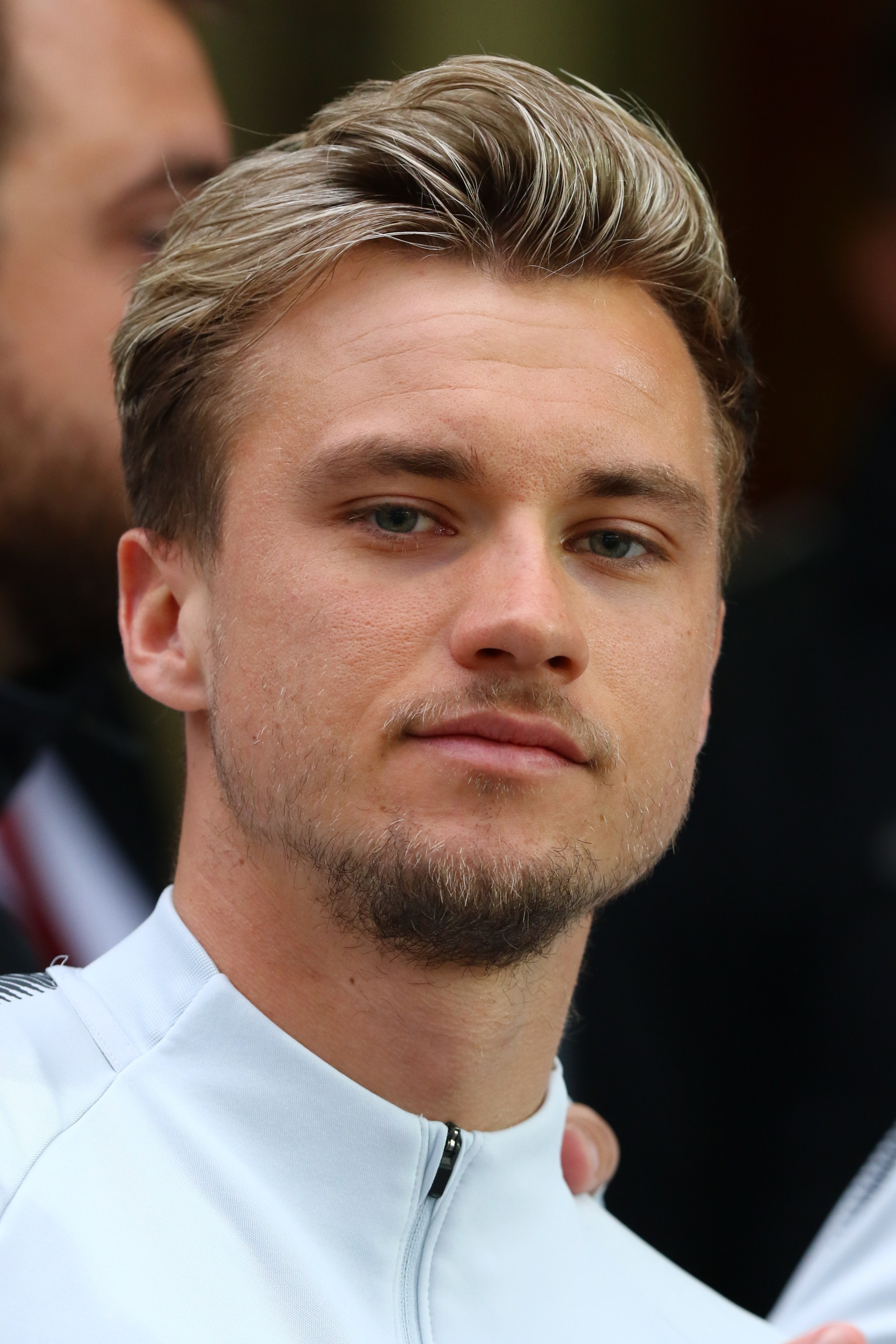
- Gulbrandsen with Red Bull Salzburg in 2018

Personal information
- Full name: Fredrik Aasmundrud Gulbrandsen
- Date of birth: 10 September 1992 (age 34)
- Place of birth: Lillestrøm, Norway
- Height: 1.75 m (5 ft 9 in)
- Position: Forward

Team information
- Current team: Lillestrøm
- Number: 8

Youth career
- Lillestrøm

Senior career*
Years	Team	Apps	(Gls)
2008–2013	Lillestrøm	57	(7)
2010	→ Lyn (loan)	8	(1)
2013–2016	Molde	42	(19)
2016–2019	Red Bull Salzburg	63	(19)
2017	→ New York Red Bulls (loan)	12	(0)
2019–2022	İstanbul Başakşehir	79	(15)
2022–2023	Adana Demirspor	23	(2)
2023–2026	Molde	50	(15)
2026–	Lillestrøm	5	(0)

International career^{‡}
2011	Norway U19	5	(0)
2013	Norway U21	2	(0)
2014–2016	Norway	3	(0)
- * Club domestic league appearances and goals as of 29 August 2026 ‡ National team caps and goals as of 3 April 2016

Fredrik Aasmundrud Gulbrandsen (born 10 September 1992) is a Norwegian professional footballer who plays as a forward for Lillestrøm.

== Club career ==
=== Lillestrøm ===
Gulbrandsen began his career with his hometown club Lillestrøm. He made his debut in the Norwegian top division against IK Start in May 2009, as the youngest Lillestrøm player ever. In March 2010, he was loaned out to Lyn for the duration of the spring season. While with Lyn he made 11 appearances and scored 2 goals. He returned to Lillestrøm for the 2011 season, and on 3 July 2011 scored his first goal for the club in a 2–1 victory over Viking FK.

=== Molde ===
On 15 July 2013, Gulbrandsen signed a contract with Molde. He had a breakthrough season in 2014 appearing in 29 matches and scored 14 goals in all competitions, helping Molde to their first league and cup double in club history. On 23 November 2014, Gulbrandsen opened the scoring for Molde in a 2–0 victory over Odd in the 2014 Norwegian Football Cup Final. After an injury plagued 2015 season, Gulbrandsen regained his form scoring 4 goals in 9 matches to start the 2016 season, drawing the attention of top European sides.

=== Red Bull Salzburg ===
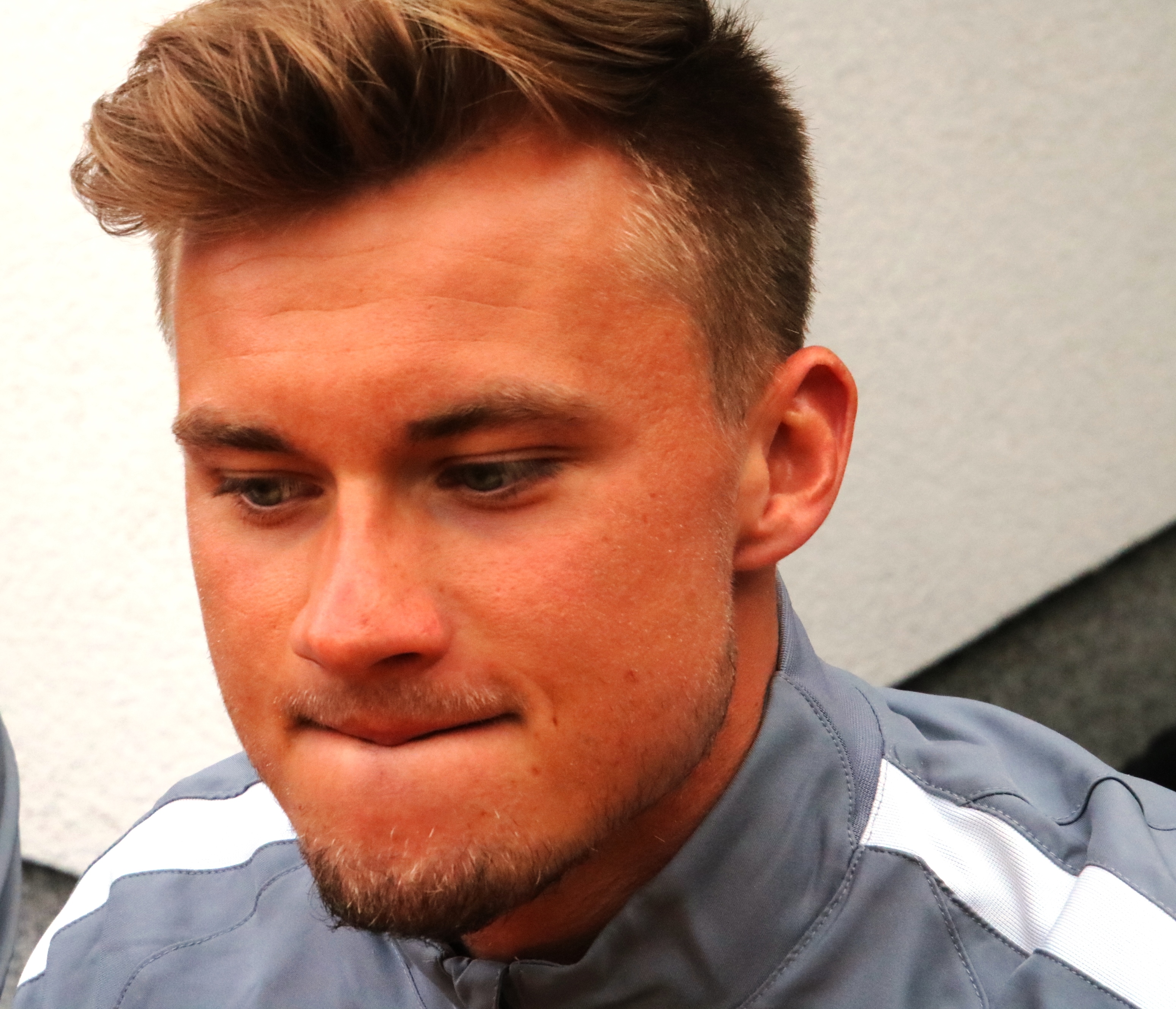
Gulbrandsen with Red Bull Salzburg in 2018

On 16 June 2016, he moved to Red Bull Salzburg and signed a contract until 2019. On 23 July 2016, he scored his first goal for Red Bull Salzburg in his league debut in a 3–1 loss to Sturm Graz. On 23 October 2016 Gulbrandsen scored his second goal for Salzburg in a 5–1 victory over SKN St. Pölten.

On 10 March 2017, Gulbrandsen joined Major League Soccer side New York Red Bulls on a one-year loan deal. He was released on 6 June 2017.

During the 2017–18 season, Salzburg had their best ever European campaign. They finished top of their Europa League group, for a record fourth time, before beating Real Sociedad and Borussia Dortmund thus making their first ever appearance in the UEFA Europa League semi-final. On 3 May 2018, he played in the Europa League semi-finals as Olympique de Marseille played out a 1–2 away loss but a 3–2 aggregate win to secure a place in the 2018 UEFA Europa League Final.

=== İstanbul Başakşehir ===
On 25 June 2019, he signed three-year contract with Turkish Süper Lig club İstanbul Başakşehir.

=== Adana Demirspor ===
On 8 September 2022, he signed two-year contract with Turkish Süper Lig club Adana Demirspor. On 4 August 2023, Gulbrandsen left Adana Demirspor.

=== Molde return ===
On 31 August 2023, Gulbrandsen returned to Norway to re-sign for Molde. On 25 June 2026, Molde announced that Gulbrandsen would be leaving the club at the end of the month when his contract expired after turning down a contract extension until the end of the year, but would continue to train with the club until finding a new team.

=== Lillestrøm return ===
On 29 June 2026, Gulbrandsen joined his former club Lillestrøm on a one-and-a-half year contract.

== International career ==
Gulbrandsen made his debut for the Norway national football team on 27 August 2014 in a friendly against the United Arab Emirates in Stavanger. He started the match, which ended goalless, but was substituted at half time for fellow debutant Fredrik Ulvestad. His competitive debut came on 16 November, replacing Tarik Elyounoussi in added time at the end of a 1–0 away win against Azerbaijan in UEFA Euro 2016 qualifying.

== Personal life ==
He is the son of footballer Tom Gulbrandsen who played for Lillestrøm and SV Ried.

== Career statistics ==
As of match played 27 August 2026

Appearances and goals by club, season and competition
Club	Season	League			National Cup (Note: Includes Norwegian Cup, Austrian Cup, Turkish Cup)		Continental		Other		Total	
Club	Season	Division	Apps	Goals	Apps	Goals	Apps	Goals	Apps	Goals	Apps	Goals
Lillestrøm	2009	Tippeligaen	5	0	2	1	—		—		7	1
Lillestrøm	2010	Tippeligaen	5	0	0	0	—		—		5	0
Lillestrøm	2011	Tippeligaen	22	4	3	1	—		—		25	5
Lillestrøm	2012	Tippeligaen	10	1	1	0	—		—		11	1
Lillestrøm	2013	Tippeligaen	15	2	3	0	—		—		18	2
Lillestrøm	Total		57	7	9	2	—		—		66	9
Lyn (loan)	2010	1. divisjon	8	1	3	1	—		—		11	2
Molde	2013	Tippeligaen	10	5	2	0	2 (Note: One appearance in UEFA Champions League, one appearance in UEFA Europa League)	0	—		14	5
Molde	2014	Tippeligaen	23	10	4	3	1 (Note: Appearances in UEFA Europa League)	1	—		28	14
Molde	2015	Tippeligaen	0	0	0	0	2	0	—		2	0
Molde	2016	Tippeligaen	9	4	1	0	1	0	—		11	4
Molde	Total		42	19	7	3	6	1	—		55	23
Red Bull Salzburg	2016–17	Austrian Bundesliga	9	2	2	0	6 (Note: Three appearances in UEFA Champions League, three appearances in UEFA Europa League)	0	—		17	2
Red Bull Salzburg	2017–18	Austrian Bundesliga	31	11	5	4	19 (Note: Four appearances and one goal in UEFA Champions League, fifteen appearances and two goals in UEFA Europa League)	3	—		55	18
Red Bull Salzburg	2018–19	Austrian Bundesliga	23	6	3	0	9	5	—		35	11
Red Bull Salzburg	Total		63	19	10	4	34	8	—		107	31
New York Red Bulls (loan)	2017	MLS	12	0	0	0	0	0	—		12	0
İstanbul Başakşehir	2019–20	Süper Lig	20	3	2	0	11 (Note: Two appearances in UEFA Champions League, nine appearances in UEFA Europa League)	0	—		33	3
İstanbul Başakşehir	2020–21	Süper Lig	29	7	3	4	4 (Note: Appearances in UEFA Champions League)	0	1 (Note: Appearance in Turkish Super Cup)	0	37	11
İstanbul Başakşehir	2021–22	Süper Lig	30	5	0	0	—		—		30	5
İstanbul Başakşehir	Total		79	15	5	4	15	0	1	0	100	19
Adana Demirspor	2022–23	Süper Lig	23	2	1	0	—		—		24	2
Adana Demirspor	Total		23	2	1	0	—		—		24	2
Molde	2023	Eliteserien	7	2	1	1	5	2	—		13	5
Molde	2024	Eliteserien	8	2	4	0	6 (Note: Appearances in UEFA Europa Conference League)	5	—		18	7
Molde	2025	Eliteserien	24	7	2	1	3	1	—		29	9
Molde	2026	Eliteserien	11	4	1	0	0	0	—		12	4
Molde	Total		50	15	8	2	14	8	—		72	25
Lillestrøm	2026	Eliteserien	5	0	0	0	2	0	—		7	0
Career total			339	78	43	16	71	17	1	0	454	111

== Honours ==
Molde

- Tippeligaen: 2014
- Norwegian Cup: 2013, 2014, 2023

Red Bull Salzburg

- Austrian Bundesliga: 2016–17, 2017–18
- Austrian Cup: 2016–17

İstanbul Başakşehir

- Süper Lig: 2019–20

Individual

- Eliteserien Goal of the Month: July 2025
