= Petter Vaagan Moen =

Norwegian footballer (born 1984)

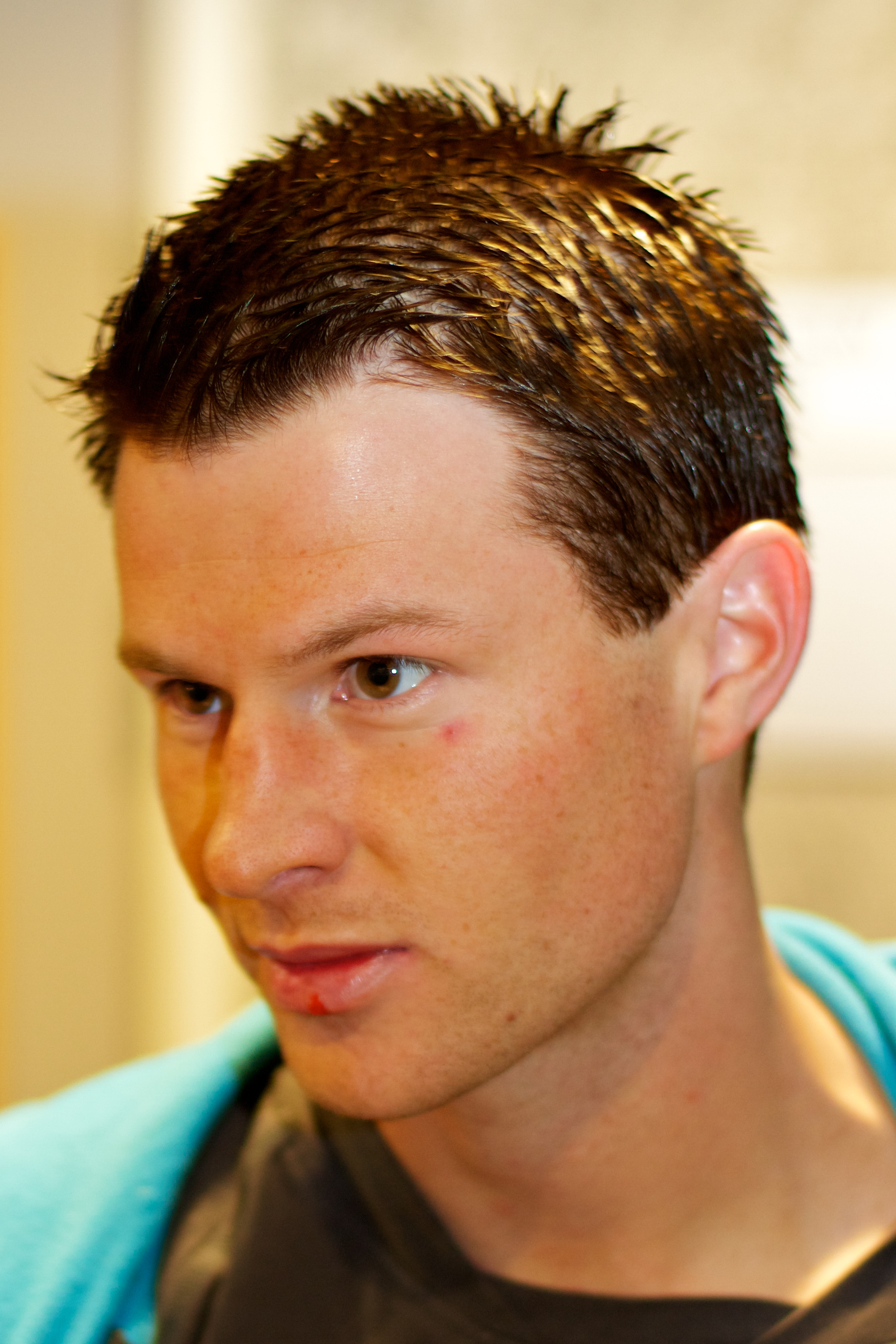
- Vaagan Moen in 2010

Personal information
- Date of birth: 5 February 1984 (age 42)
- Place of birth: Hamar, Norway
- Height: 1.78 m (5 ft 10 in)
- Position: Midfielder

Youth career
- HamKam

Senior career*
Years	Team	Apps	(Gls)
2001–2005	HamKam	96	(10)
2006–2010	Brann	123	(31)
2011–2012	Queens Park Rangers	7	(0)
2012–2015	Lillestrøm	77	(21)
2015–2016	Strømsgodset	26	(2)
2017–2019	HamKam	47	(8)
Total		376	(72)

International career
2004–2006	Norway U21	18	(1)
2006–2011	Norway	9	(1)
- * Club domestic league appearances and goals

Petter Vaagan Moen (born 5 February 1984) is a Norwegian former professional footballer who played as a midfielder for HamKam, Brann, Queens Park Rangers, Lillestrøm and Strømsgodset Toppfotball. Vaagan Moen has 44 national junior caps (16 caps and one goal for Norway's U21 national team which he captained from autumn 2005 until 2006).

== Career ==
=== HamKam ===
Vaagan Moen started his career in HamKam and helped the club to promotion to the Tippeliga in 2003. Vaagan Moen's crosses and free-kicks got him noticed by the big clubs in Norway, and he was thought upon as one of the biggest talents in Norwegian football. It was during his trials at HamKam that Moen earned the nickname "Mjøsas Beckham" (The Beckham of Mjøsa)

=== Brann ===
In 2005, Vaagan Moen signed with SK Brann, a deal worth 10 million NOK (approx £1 million). The winger quickly established himself as a regular on the first team, and was an important contribution to Brann's first league title since 1963. In the 2008 and 2009 season he did not play as good as expected, and many thought he had lost his potential.

In the 2010 season he was positioned as a centre midfielder and he scored 14 goals and was Brann's topscorer and was select player of the year. Because of his good form he was called up to the Norway national team for the first time since 2007. After the 2010 season he chose not to renew his contract with Brann because of several offers from foreign clubs.

=== Queens Park Rangers ===
In December 2010, Queens Park Rangers of the English Championship confirmed that Vaagan Moen had signed a two-and-a-half-year contract with the club and would join on a free transfer on 1 January 2011. He made his début on 3 January, coming on for midfielder Adel Taarabt in the 87th minute. He finished his first season at QPR making eight appearances.

After QPR were promoted to the Premier League, the team brought in new players and it became very difficult for Vaagan Moen to break into the first team. When the new season started and QPR had to reveal their 25-men squad, Vaagan Moen was not involved and had to play reserve games for QPR instead for the rest of the year. He did however score twice for QPR in pre-season; one in a 13–0 win over Tavistock, and one in a 7–0 win against Bodmin Town.

In December 2011, QPR announced their plans to bring in new players and on 30 January 2012 it was confirmed that QPR had cancelled the contract of six players including Vaagan Moen, he therefore became free agent.

=== Lillestrøm ===
On 29 February 2012, the Norwegian club Lillestrøm SK announced that they had signed a three-year contract with Vaagan Moen. He wore shirt number 10.

=== Strømsgodset ===
On 27 January 2015, Vaagan Moen signed a three-year contract for Strømsgodset Toppfotball on a free transfer.

== Career statistics ==
Appearances and goals by club, season and competition
Club	Season	League			National cup (Note: Includes Norwegian Football Cup, FA Cup)		Europe		Total	
Club	Season	Division	Apps	Goals	Apps	Goals	Apps	Goals	Apps	Goals
HamKam	2001	Norwegian First Division	4	0	0	0	—		4	0
HamKam	2002	Norwegian First Division	16	3	0	0	—		16	3
HamKam	2003	Norwegian First Division	28	3	1	0	—		29	3
HamKam	2004	Tippeligaen	25	1	5	0	—		30	1
HamKam	2005	Tippeligaen	23	3	3	1	—		26	4
HamKam	Total		96	10	9	1	—		105	11
Brann	2006	Tippeligaen	24	3	4	0	1 (Note: Appearance(s) in UEFA Cup)	0	29	3
Brann	2007	Tippeligaen	25	5	2	0	10	3	37	8
Brann	2008	Tippeligaen	22	3	2	0	5	0	29	3
Brann	2009	Tippeligaen	25	6	3	0	—		28	6
Brann	2010	Tippeligaen	27	14	2	1	—		29	15
Brann	Total		123	31	13	1	16	3	152	35
Queens Park Rangers	2010–11	Championship	7	0	1	0	—		8	0
Queens Park Rangers	2011–12	Premier League	0	0	0	0	—		0	0
Queens Park Rangers	Total		7	0	1	0	—		8	0
Lillestrøm	2012	Tippeligaen	23	6	4	0	—		27	6
Lillestrøm	2013	Tippeligaen	27	8	5	0	—		32	12
Lillestrøm	2014	Tippeligaen	27	7	5	4	—		31	11
Lillestrøm	Total		77	21	17	8	—		94	29
Strømsgodset	2015	Tippeligaen	6	1	1	1	4 (Note: Appearance(s) in UEFA Europa League)	1	11	3
Strømsgodset	2016	Tippeligaen	20	1	4	1	1	0	25	2
Strømsgodset	Total		26	2	5	2	5	1	36	5
HamKam	2017	Norwegian Second Division	23	1	1	1	—		24	2
HamKam	2018	Norwegian First Division	23	7	3	0	—		26	7
HamKam	2019	Norwegian First Division	1	0	2	0	—		3	0
HamKam	Total		47	8	6	1	—		53	9
Career total			376	72	51	13	21	4	448	89

=== International ===
Scores and results list Norway's goal tally first, score column indicates score after Moen goal.

International goal scored by Petter Vaagan Moen
#	Date	Venue	Opponent	Score	Result	Competition
1.	7 February 2007	Stadion Kantrida, Rijeka, Croatia	Croatia	1–2	1–2	Friendly

== Honours ==
Brann

- Tippeligaen: 2007

Queens Park Rangers

- Football League Championship: 2010–11
