= Lasse Staw =

Norwegian footballer (born 1988)

Personal information
- Full name: Lasse Staw
- Date of birth: 1 January 1988 (age 38)
- Place of birth: Skiptvet, Norway
- Height: 1.90 m (6 ft 3 in)
- Position: Goalkeeper

Youth career
- Skiptvet IL
- Trosvik IF
- Borg

Senior career*
Years	Team	Apps	(Gls)
2004–2011	Fredrikstad	75	(0)
2012	Syrianska	8	(0)
2012	Lillestrøm	2	(0)
2013	Aalesund	0	(0)
2014–2015	Bodø/Glimt	23	(0)

International career
2007–2010	Norway U21	10	(0)
- * Club domestic league appearances and goals

Lasse Staw (born 1 January 1988) is a former Norwegian footballer. He has played for Fredrikstad, Syrianska, Lillestrøm, Aalesund and Bodø/Glimt.

== Career ==
=== Club career ===
Staw made his debut in the very last match of the 2004 season against Viking. In the 2006 season he made several appearances, and did things very well. He has played for several minor clubs before he went to Fredrikstad.

On 24 March 2012 it was announced that Staw had signed with Allsvenskan club Syrianska FC. He joined Lillestrøm on a half-year contract in August 2012, as the club wanted another goalkeeper as their first-choice goalkeeper Stefán Logi Magnússon was injured for the rest of the season.

== Career statistics ==
Club	Season	Division	League		Cup		Total	
Club	Season	Division	Apps	Goals	Apps	Goals	Apps	Goals
2004	Fredrikstad	Tippeligaen	1	0	0	0	1	0
2005	Fredrikstad	Tippeligaen	0	0	0	0	0	0
2006	Fredrikstad	Tippeligaen	4	0	0	0	3	0
2007	Fredrikstad	Tippeligaen	4	0	1	0	5	0
2008	Fredrikstad	Tippeligaen	11	0	1	0	12	0
2009	Fredrikstad	Tippeligaen	15	0	2	0	17	0
2010	Fredrikstad	Adeccoligaen	18	0	2	0	20	0
2011	Fredrikstad	Tippeligaen	22	0	1	0	23	0
2012	Syrianska	Allsvenskan	8	0	0	0	8	0
2012	Lillestrøm	Tippeligaen	2	0	0	0	2	0
2013	Aalesund	Tippeligaen	0	0	2	0	2	0
2014	Bodø/Glimt	Tippeligaen	14	0	4	0	18	0
2015	Bodø/Glimt	Tippeligaen	9	0	1	0	10	0
Career Total			108	0	14	0	122	0
