= Anders Østli =

Norwegian footballer (born 1983)

Personal information
- Full name: Anders Østli
- Date of birth: 8 January 1983 (age 43)
- Place of birth: Fredrikstad, Norway
- Height: 1.85 m (6 ft 1 in)
- Position: Defender

Team information
- Current team: Kråkerøy
- Number: 2

Senior career*
Years	Team	Apps	(Gls)
2003	Fredrikstad	2	(0)
2004–2005	Moss	43	(0)
2005–2008	BK Skjold	49	(6)
2008–2012	SønderjyskE	106	(2)
2012–2014	Lillestrøm	53	(2)
2014–2016	Vestsjælland	32	(1)
2015–2016	→ Horsens (loan)	4	(1)
2016–2017	Sarpsborg 08	27	(1)
2018	Moss	7	(0)
2019–	Kråkerøy	0	(0)

Managerial career
- 2019–: Kråkerøy (player-assistant)
- * Club domestic league appearances and goals as of 29 January 2019

Anders Østli (born 8 January 1983) is a Norwegian footballer currently under contract for Norwegian side Kråkerøy, where he is a playing assistant coach.

== Career statistics ==
As of 7 November 2017

Season	Club	Division	League		Cup		Total	
Season	Club	Division	Apps	Goals	Apps	Goals	Apps	Goals
2008–09	SønderjyskE	Danish Superliga	16	0	0	0	16	0
2009–10	SønderjyskE	Danish Superliga	32	1	1	0	33	1
2010–11	SønderjyskE	Danish Superliga	32	1	0	0	32	1
2011–12	SønderjyskE	Danish Superliga	26	0	3	0	29	0
2012	Lillestrøm	Tippeligaen	13	1	0	0	13	1
2013	Lillestrøm	Tippeligaen	30	1	5	2	35	3
2014	Lillestrøm	Tippeligaen	10	0	0	0	10	0
2014–15	Vestsjælland	Danish Superliga	28	0	6	0	34	0
2015–16	Vestsjælland	Danish 1st Division	4	1	1	0	5	1
2015–16	Horsens (loan)	Danish 1st Division	0	0	0	0	0	0
2016	Sarpsborg 08	Tippeligaen	15	0	2	0	17	0
2017	Sarpsborg 08	Eliteserien	12	1	1	0	13	1
Career Total			218	6	19	2	237	8
