= Stian Ringstad =

Norwegian football defender (born 1991)

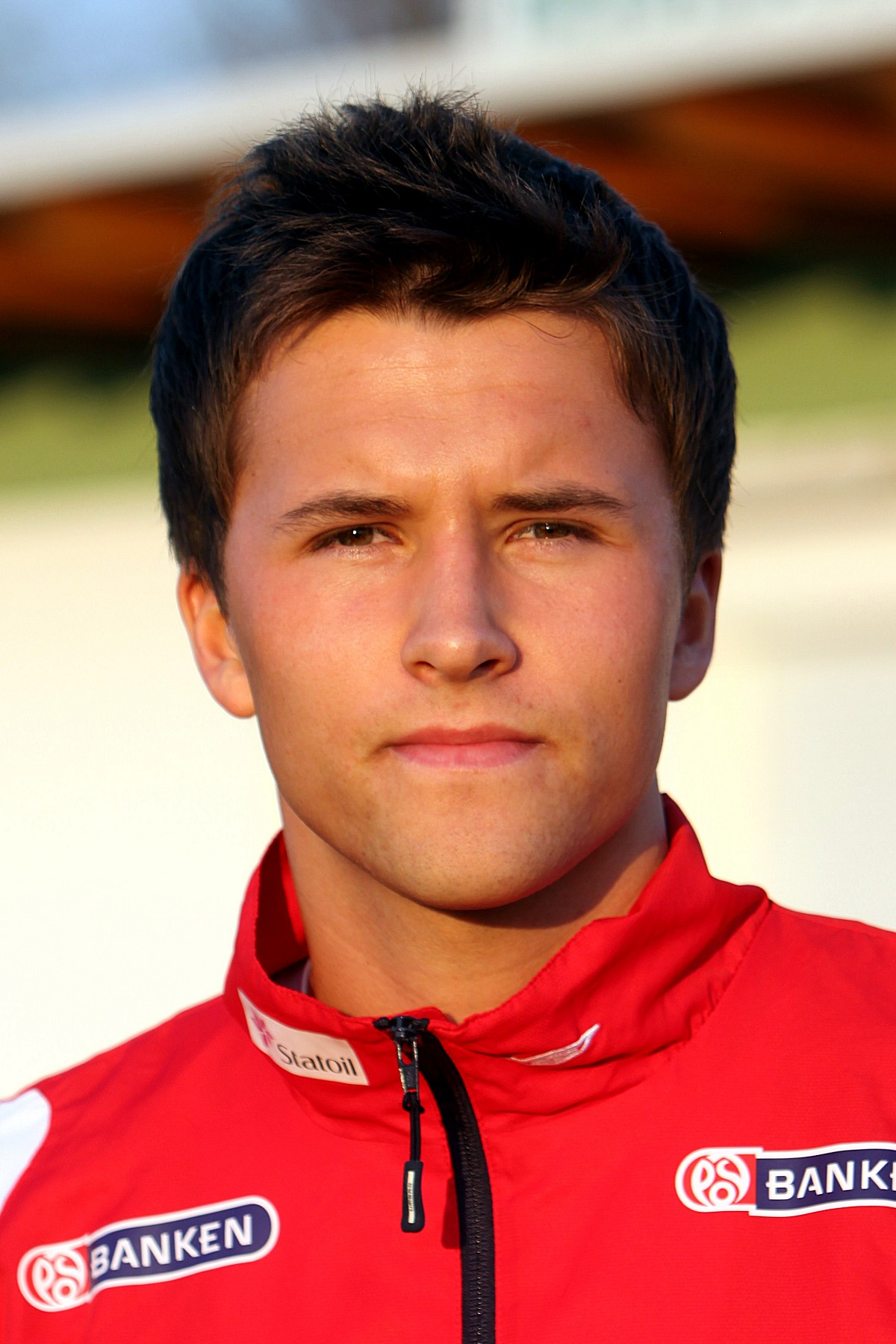

Personal information
- Full name: Stian Lunder Ringstad
- Date of birth: 29 August 1991 (age 35)
- Place of birth: Nes, Norway
- Height: 1.82 m (6 ft 0 in)
- Position: Defender

Team information
- Current team: Ullensaker/Kisa
- Number: 8

Youth career
- –2003: Haga IF
- 2004–2007: Eidsvold Turn

Senior career*
Years	Team	Apps	(Gls)
2007–2008	Eidsvold Turn		
2009–2015	Lillestrøm	115	(2)
2016–2017	Braga	7	(0)
2017–2019	Strømsgodset	23	(0)
2018	→ Sandefjord (loan)	14	(1)
2019	Haugesund	2	(0)
2020–	Ullensaker/Kisa	56	(2)

International career
2007	Norway U16	9	(1)
2008	Norway U17	11	(2)
2009	Norway U18	1	(1)
2010	Norway U19	5	(1)
2011–2013	Norway U21	3	(0)
2014	Norway	1	(0)
- * Club domestic league appearances and goals as of 15 August 2022

Stian Lunder Ringstad (born 29 August 1991) is a Norwegian football defender who currently plays for Ullensaker/Kisa. He has previously played for Lillestrøm and Eidsvold Turn.

He hails from the tiny village Bodding near Haga, Nes, and was brought into the senior squad of Eidsvold Turn for the 2007 season. He could have made his debut in 2006, but the Football Association of Norway refused, citing that he was too young.

After the 2008 season he joined regional greats Lillestrøm. He played in the 2009 La Manga Cup, and made his Norwegian Premier League debut against Aalesunds FK in April 2009, in a 2-3 away loss.

== Career statistics ==
=== Club ===
As of match played 13 August 2022

Appearances and goals by club, season and competition
Club	Season	League			National Cup		Europe		Total	
Club	Season	Division	Apps	Goals	Apps	Goals	Apps	Goals	Apps	Goals
Lillestrøm	2009	Tippeligaen	7	0	2	0	-		9	0
Lillestrøm	2010	Tippeligaen	3	0	0	0	-		3	0
Lillestrøm	2011	Tippeligaen	19	0	1	0	-		20	0
Lillestrøm	2012	Tippeligaen	20	0	4	0	-		24	0
Lillestrøm	2013	Tippeligaen	23	0	5	0	-		28	0
Lillestrøm	2014	Tippeligaen	23	2	3	0	-		26	2
Lillestrøm	2015	Tippeligaen	20	0	3	0	-		23	0
Lillestrøm	Total		115	2	18	0	-	-	133	2
Braga	2015–16	Primeira Liga	7	0	1	0	-		8	0
Braga	2016–17	Primeira Liga	0	0	0	0	-		0	0
Braga	Total		7	0	1	0	-	-	8	0
Strømsgodset	2017	Eliteserien	8	0	1	0	-		9	0
Strømsgodset	2018	Eliteserien	3	0	2	0	-		5	0
Strømsgodset	2019	Eliteserien	12	0	2	1	-		14	1
Strømsgodset	Total		23	0	5	1	-	-	28	1
Sandefjord (loan)	2018	Eliteserien	14	1	0	0	-		14	1
Sandefjord (loan)	Total		14	1	0	0	-	-	14	1
Haugesund	2019	Eliteserien	2	0	0	0	-		2	0
Haugesund	Total		2	0	0	0	-	-	2	0
Ullensaker/Kisa	2020	OBOS-ligaen	17	2	0	0	-		17	2
Ullensaker/Kisa	2021	OBOS-ligaen	27	0	2	0	-		29	0
Ullensaker/Kisa	2022	PostNord-ligaen	12	0	3	0	-		15	0
Ullensaker/Kisa	Total		56	2	5	0	-	-	61	2
Career total			217	5	29	1	-	-	246	6
