= Krister Wemberg =

Norwegian footballer (born 1992)

Personal information
- Date of birth: 21 February 1992 (age 34)
- Place of birth: Sortland, Norway
- Position: Centre back

Youth career
- Sortland

Senior career*
Years	Team	Apps	(Gls)
2008–2010	Moss	42	(0)
2010–2013	Molde	3	(0)
2012	→ Bodø/Glimt (loan)	17	(0)
2013–2020	Bryne	139	(3)

International career^{‡}
2007–2009	Norway U17	7	(1)
2008–2010	Norway U18	6	(0)
2009–2011	Norway U19	3	(0)
- * Club domestic league appearances and goals as of 20 October 2019 ‡ National team caps and goals as of 25 July 2011

Krister Wemberg (born 21 February 1992) is a Norwegian footballer who plays as a defender for Bryne. He has previously played for Moss, Bodø/Glimt and Molde.

== Club career ==
=== Early career ===
Born in Sortland Municipality, Wemberg played for Sortland IL's youth categories. In 2008, at the age of 16, Wemberg made an unsuccessful trial with Everton.

=== Moss FK ===
Wemberg appeared on the bench in late 2008, in the matches against Bryne, Nybergsund and Start. However, he could not enter in the field.

Wemberg made his debut on 26 April 2009, at the age of 17, in the victory against Notodden. In his first season at Moss, Wemberg made 23 appearances, 20 as a starter. In March 2010, Wemberg made another trial, this time with Fulham, but was unsuccessful again. In July 2010, Wemberg made his third trial with Rangers.

In the 2010 season, Wemberg played every match for Moss, all 20 of them as a starter, until he signed for Molde on 31 August 2010, and became Uwe Rösler's first signing as head coach of Molde.

=== Molde FK ===
In Molde, Wemberg playing time was reduced. He played 5 friendly matches for the club, but until May 2011 he had yet to appear in official competitions for the club. His debut came on 29 May 2011, in the heavily defeat against Haugesund. Wemberg started the game, but was replaced after 61 minutes. Wemberg gained two more matches, enough to win the 2011 Tippeligaen title.

=== FK Bodø/Glimt ===
13 January 2012 Molde announced that Wemberg would join Bodø/Glimt on a season long loan. He played 17 matches (15 as a starter, 1423 minutes overall) before returning to Molde.

=== Bryne FK ===
On 5 March 2013, Wemberg signed a contract with Bryne.

== International career ==
Wemberg played for national team on U19 side. He made his international debut on 15 November 2009, against Andorra.

He played only one more match for U19, on 30 September 2010, against Liechtenstein.

== Career statistics ==
Club	Season	Division	League		Cup		Total	
Club	Season	Division	Apps	Goals	Apps	Goals	Apps	Goals
Moss	2008	1. divisjon	0	0	0	0	0	0
Moss	2009	1. divisjon	23	0	0	0	23	0
Moss	2010	1. divisjon	19	0	3	0	22	0
Moss	Total		42	0	3	0	45	0
Molde	2011	Tippeligaen	3	0	3	0	6	0
Bodø/Glimt	2012	1. divisjon	17	0	4	0	21	0
Bryne	2013	1. divisjon	23	1	2	0	25	1
Bryne	2014	1. divisjon	13	1	1	0	14	1
Bryne	2015	1. divisjon	20	0	2	0	22	0
Bryne	2016	1. divisjon	26	0	1	0	27	0
Bryne	2017	2. divisjon	22	1	2	0	24	1
Bryne	2018	2. divisjon	16	0	4	0	20	0
Bryne	2019	2. divisjon	13	0	1	0	14	0
Bryne	2020	2. divisjon	0	0	0	0	0	0
Bryne	Total		139	3	13	0	152	3
Career total			201	3	23	0	224	3

== Honours ==
Molde FK

- Tippeligaen: 2011
