= Johan Andersson (footballer, born 1983) =

Swedish footballer

Personal information
- Full name: Johan Rickard Andersson
- Date of birth: 22 August 1983 (age 43)
- Place of birth: Landskrona, Sweden
- Height: 1.88 m (6 ft 2 in)
- Position: Midfielder

Team information
- Current team: Eidsvold Turn (manager)

Youth career
- BK Fram

Senior career*
Years	Team	Apps	(Gls)
2001–2007	Landskrona	121	(18)
2007	Malmö	5	(0)
2008–2011	Stabæk	72	(25)
2012–2015	Lillestrøm	94	(5)

International career
2002–2006	Sweden U21	18	(5)

Managerial career
- 2023–: Eidsvold Turn
- * Club domestic league appearances and goals

Johan Rickard Andersson (born 22 August 1983) is a Swedish former professional footballer who played as a midfielder.

== Career ==
Johan Andersson was reunited with his former coach Janne Jönsson from his early Landskrona career when he joined Stabæk ahead of the 2008 season. He scored two goals in his league debut for Stabæk at home against Lillestrøm in a 4–2 victory. In total he ended up scoring 12 goals in 25 games from midfield in the league, only behind team-mate Daniel Nannskog in the goal scoring chart when Stabæk won their first ever league title. In Stabæks UEFA Cup run he was involved in both matches against Rennes as they narrowly lost out in the group phase. He started all Stabæk's 7 cup games including the final against Vålerenga which they lost, scoring 5 goals in the process.

On 17 January it was reported that Andersson would need an operation on his knee, which would keep him out for most of the season. He would not be ready before late July.

He made his comeback on 29 July against F.C. Copenhagen in a Champions League qualifier as a late second-half substitute. After five more substitute appearances, he started his first game of the season on 19 September against Odd Grenland, scoring a goal in a 2–1 victory.

Andersson played 22 games and scored four goals for Stabæk in 2011, and joined Lillestrøm ahead of the 2012-season along with his team-mate Pálmi Rafn Pálmason.

Andersson settled in Norway after retiring as a player. Becoming a manager, he took over Eidsvold Turn ahead of the 2023, and immediately steered the team to promotion from the 2023 3. divisjon.

== Career statistics ==
As of 5 May 2015

Club performance			League		Cup		Continental		Total	
Season	Club	League	Apps	Goals	Apps	Goals	Apps	Goals	Apps	Goals
Sweden			League		Svenska Cupen		Europe		Total	
2001	Landskrona	Superettan	23	2						
2002	Landskrona	Allsvenskan	23	1						
2003	Landskrona	Allsvenskan	23	2						
2004	Landskrona	Allsvenskan	21	5						
2005	Landskrona	Allsvenskan	9	0						
2006	Landskrona	Superettan	22	8						
2007	Malmö	Allsvenskan	5	0	2	2			7	2
Norway			League		Norwegian Cup		Europe		Total	
2008	Stabæk	Tippeligaen	25	12	7	5	2	0	34	17
2009	Stabæk	Tippeligaen	7	2	1	0	2	0	10	2
2010	Stabæk	Tippeligaen	18	7	0	0	0	0	18	7
2011	Stabæk	Tippeligaen	22	4	0	0	0	0	22	4
2012	Lillestrøm	Tippeligaen	27	2	2	0	0	0	29	2
2013	Lillestrøm	Tippeligaen	29	1	5	1	0	0	35	2
2014	Lillestrøm	Tippeligaen	26	0	3	0			29	0
2015	Lillestrøm	Tippeligaen	12	2	0	0			12	2
Total	Sweden		126	18	2	2			?	?
Total	Norway		166	30	18	6	4	0	188	36
Career total			292	48	20	8	4	0	316	56
