= Isak Scheel =

Norwegian footballer (born 1990)

Personal information
- Date of birth: 19 June 1990 (age 36)
- Place of birth: Oslo, Norway
- Position: Defender

Youth career
- Frigg
- Ready
- –2009: Stabæk

Senior career*
Years	Team	Apps	(Gls)
2010–2011	Sogndal	46	(0)
2012–2013	Lillestrøm	8	(0)
2012	→ Bærum (loan)	15	(0)
- * Club domestic league appearances and goals as of 8 July 2013

Isak Scheel (born 19 June 1990) is a retired Norwegian football defender.

Scheel hails from Oslo, starting his career in Frigg and Ready before joining Stabæk while also attending the Norwegian College of Elite Sport.

He started his senior career in Sogndal, where he made his Adeccoligaen debut already in 2010. Ahead of the 2012 season he signed for Lillestrøm. He made his debut in for Lillestrøm in a 1-0 win to Sogndal on 20 May 2012.

The autumn of the 2012 season he was on loan to Bærum. In September 2013 he received "study leave" from Lillestrøm. He was released three months later.

== Career statistics ==
Season	Club	Division	League		Cup		Total	
Season	Club	Division	Apps	Goals	Apps	Goals	Apps	Goals
2010	Sogndal	Adeccoligaen	17	0	3	0	20	0
2011	Sogndal	Tippeligaen	29	0	4	0	33	0
2012	Lillestrøm	Tippeligaen	4	0	2	0	6	0
2012	Bærum	Adeccoligaen	15	0	0	0	15	0
2013	Lillestrøm	Tippeligaen	4	0	1	0	5	0
Career Total			69	0	10	0	79	0
