= Espen Nystuen =

Norwegian footballer (born 1981)

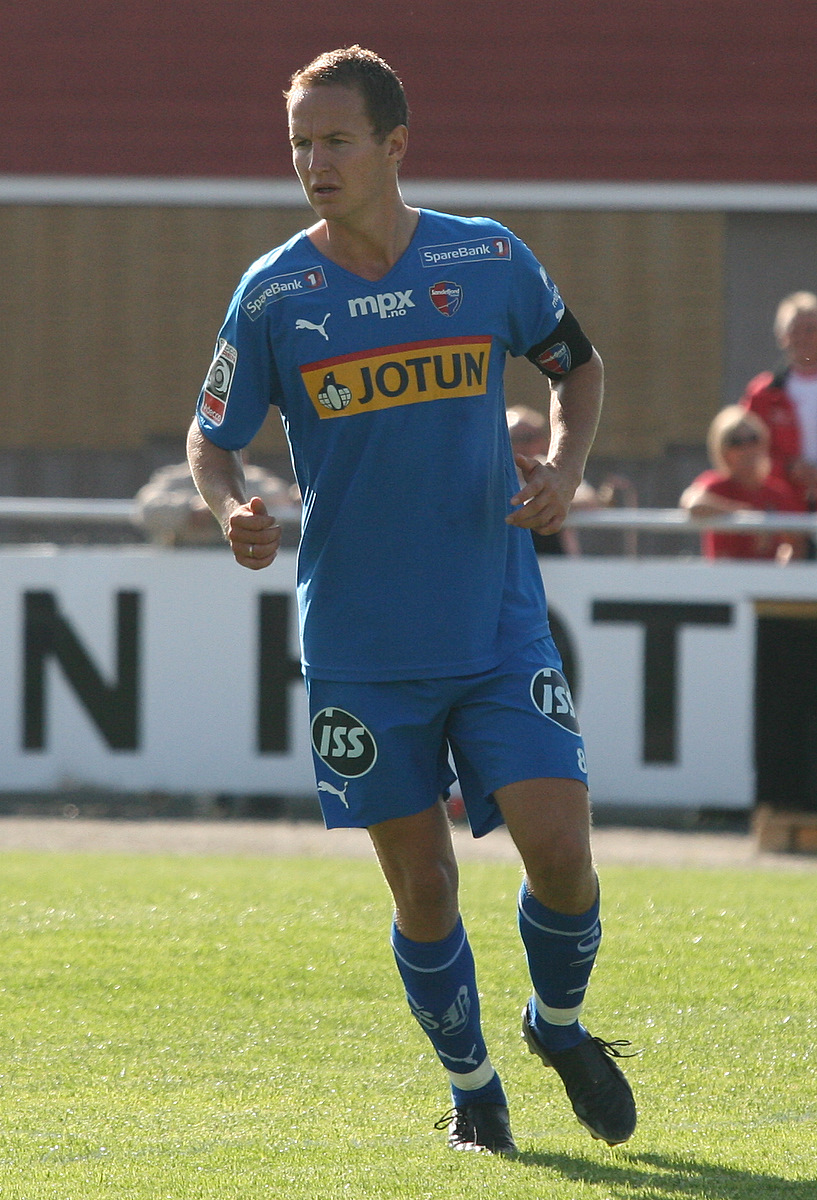

Personal information
- Full name: Espen Nystuen
- Date of birth: 19 December 1981 (age 44)
- Place of birth: Kongsvinger, Norway
- Height: 1.83 m (6 ft 0 in)
- Positions: Defender; midfielder

Senior career*
Years	Team	Apps	(Gls)
1998–2005	Kongsvinger	108	(14)
2006–2008	Stabæk	24	(0)
2008–2012	Sandefjord	110	(7)
2012	Lillestrøm	18	(1)
2013–2016	Kongsvinger	60	(6)

Managerial career
- 2020–: Kongsvinger (interim)
- * Club domestic league appearances and goals as of 25 November 2016

Espen Nystuen (born 19 December 1981) is a former Norwegian footballer.

Nystuen previously played for Kongsvinger. A part of the community since he was a child, he had never played for any other club until he was sold to Stabæk ahead of the 2006 season. He was sold from Stabæk to Sandefjord in March 2008, before signing for Lillestrøm as a free agent in March 2012. Before the season of 2013 he once again signed for Kongsvinger. This time with a divided role as the club's CEO and a player.

Espen Nystuen is the son of former Kongsvinger player and coach Erik Nystuen. After the 2016 Nystuen decide to retire to focus on his job as a CEO.

== Career statistics ==
Club	Season	Division	League		Cup		Total	
Club	Season	Division	Apps	Goals	Apps	Goals	Apps	Goals
2006	Stabæk	Tippeligaen	15	0	1	0	16	0
2007	Stabæk	Tippeligaen	9	0	2	0	11	0
2008	Sandefjord	Adeccoligaen	27	2	0	0	27	2
2009	Sandefjord	Tippeligaen	27	1	1	0	28	1
2010	Sandefjord	Tippeligaen	29	1	2	0	31	1
2011	Sandefjord	Adeccoligaen	27	3	3	0	30	3
2012	Lillestrøm	Tippeligaen	18	1	2	0	20	1
2013	Kongsvinger	Adeccoligaen	23	4	2	0	25	4
2014	Kongsvinger	2. divisjon	15	1	2	0	17	1
2016	Kongsvinger	OBOS-ligaen	22	1	5	0	27	1
Career Total			212	14	20	0	232	14
