= Guy Toindouba =

Cameroonian footballer (born 1988)

Personal information
- Full name: Guy Roger Toindouba
- Date of birth: 14 April 1988 (age 38)
- Place of birth: Garoua, Cameroon
- Height: 1.83 m (6 ft 0 in)
- Position: Midfielder

Senior career*
Years	Team	Apps	(Gls)
2005–2009	Sahel FC		
2007–2008	→ Cotonsport Garoua (loan)		
2009–2010	Al Ahly Tripoli		
2010–2011	Espérance Sportive de Tunis	21	(3)
2012	Lillestrøm	18	(1)
2013	Adana Demirspor	15	(1)
2013–2016	JS Kairouan		
2016–2017	Al-Jahra		
2017–2019	Al-Salmiya		
2019	Najran		
- * Club domestic league appearances and goals

Guy Roger Toindouba (born 14 April 1988) is a Cameroonian former professional footballer who played as a midfielder. He also holds Gabonese citizenship.

== Club career ==
Toindouba was born in Garoua. From July 2007 to January 2008 he was loaned out to Cotonsport Garoua, from Sahel SC and signed then in Summer 2009 for Al Ahly Tripoli. In the 2010 winter transfer window, he signed for Espérance Sportive de Tunis. On 1 November 2011, it was announced that he would join Lillestrøm SK for the 2012 season.

== International career ==
Toindouba played with the Cameroon national team against Colombia on 16 October 2012. As it was a friendly match, Toindouba is still eligible to play for Gabon.
