= Stefán Logi Magnússon =

Icelandic footballer (born 1980)

Stefán Logi
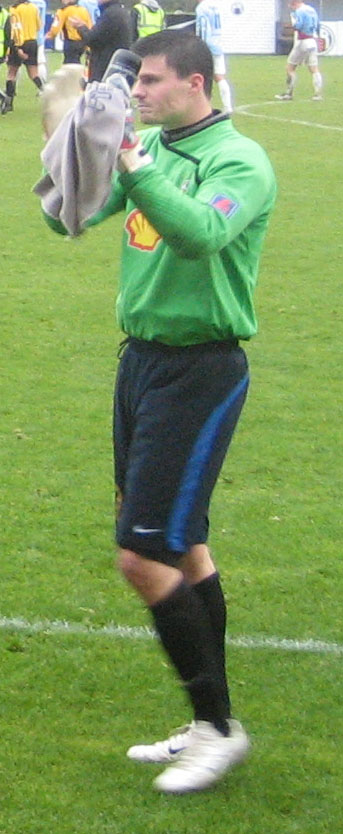

Personal information
- Full name: Stefán Logi Magnússon
- Date of birth: 5 September 1980 (age 46)
- Place of birth: Reykjavík, Iceland
- Height: 1.93 m (6 ft 4 in)
- Position: Goalkeeper

Team information
- Current team: Afturelding

Youth career
- –1996: Víkingur

Senior career*
Years	Team	Apps	(Gls)
1996	Víkingur	0	(0)
1997	Fram	0	(0)
1997–1999	Bayern Munich	0	(0)
1999	Öster	5	(0)
2000–2003	Farum	32	(0)
2003	B 1909	6	(0)
2003	Víkingur	0	(0)
2004	Þróttur	13	(0)
2005	KS	16	(0)
2006	KS/Leiftur	14	(0)
2006	Hvöt	1	(0)
2007–2009	KR	42	(0)
2009–2014	Lillestrøm	70	(0)
2013	→ Ull/Kisa (loan)	21	(0)
2014–2017	KR	67	(0)
2018	Selfoss	21	(0)
2019	Fylkir	10	(0)

International career^{‡}
1996–1997	Iceland U17	8	(0)
1996–1998	Iceland U19	13	(0)
2008–2012	Iceland	10	(0)
- * Club domestic league appearances and goals as of 7 April 2020 ‡ National team caps and goals as of 14 November 2012

Stefán Logi Magnússon (born 5 September 1980) was an Icelandic international footballer and is currently a manager at Afturelding for younger players, specifically for players aged 16–18. He made his debut with the Icelandic national team in a tournament in Malta in February 2008 against Belarus.

== Club career ==
Stefán started his career playing football at Víkingur Reykjavik, before he was picked up by Bayern Munich as a young prospect. Not making the grade in Munich, Stefán moved around a lot in his career, passing through Denmark, Sweden, England and several stops on Iceland.

== Lillestrøm SK ==
In July 2009, Stefán was picked up on a loan deal by Lillestrøm from KR, a deal that sent LSK-goalkeeping prospect André Hansen the other way. Stefán's move was shortly thereafter made permanent. Stefán made his first team debut against Vålerenga on 16 October 2009. He made several good saves and was named man of the match. He finished the season as Lillestrøm's first choice goalkeeper.

== Career statistics ==
Season	Club	Division	League		Cup		Total	
Season	Club	Division	Apps	Goals	Apps	Goals	Apps	Goals
2009	Lillestrøm	Tippeligaen	10	0	0	0	10	0
2010	Lillestrøm	Tippeligaen	29	0	3	0	32	0
2011	Lillestrøm	Tippeligaen	29	0	4	0	33	0
2012	Lillestrøm	Tippeligaen	2	0	1	0	3	0
2013	Ull/Kisa (loan)	Adeccoligaen	21	0	0	0	21	0
2014	KR	Úrvalsdeild	21	0	4	0	25	0
2015	KR	Úrvalsdeild	10	0	3	0	13	0
Career Total			122	0	15	0	137	0
