= Sead Ramović =

German footballer (born 1979)

Sead Ramovic
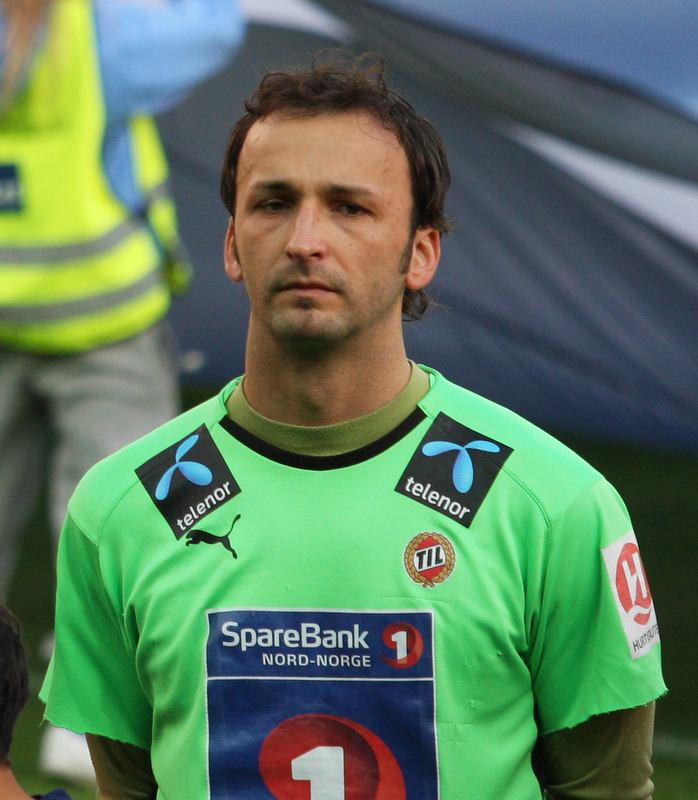
- Ramović in 2008

Personal information
- Full name: Sead Ramović
- Date of birth: 14 March 1979 (age 47)
- Place of birth: Stuttgart, West Germany
- Height: 1.90 m (6 ft 3 in)
- Position: Goalkeeper

Youth career
- FC Feuerbach
- –1995: SpVgg Feuerbach

Senior career*
Years	Team	Apps	(Gls)
1999–2001	Stuttgarter Kickers	45	(0)
2001–2004	VfL Wolfsburg	36	(0)
2004–2005	Borussia M'gladbach	4	(0)
2005–2006	Kickers Offenbach	26	(0)
2006–2010	Tromsø	110	(0)
2010	Sivasspor	10	(0)
2011	Metalurh Zaporizhzhia	2	(0)
2011–2012	Novi Pazar	2	(0)
2012	Lillestrøm	29	(0)
2013	Vendsyssel	4	(0)
2014	Strømsgodset	5	(0)
Total		273	(0)

Managerial career
- 2021–2024: TS Galaxy
- 2024–2025: Young Africans
- 2025–2026: CR Belouizdad
- * Club domestic league appearances and goals

Sead Ramović (born 14 March 1979) is a German football manager and former player. He played as a goalkeeper. As a player he spent his most successful time with Tromsø IL in Norway between 2006 and 2010. Since 2021, he has been appointed head coach for clubs in South Africa, Tanzania and Algeria.

== Club career ==
Born in Stuttgart, West Germany, Ramović started his career with FC Feuerbach. He went on to play for SpVgg Feuerbach, Stuttgarter Kickers, VfL Wolfsburg, Borussia Mönchengladbach, and Kickers Offenbach, all of which are German clubs. In July 2006, he signed with Tippeligaen club Tromsø IL. In 2010, he signed for Sivasspor. In 2011, he moved to Novi Pazar and played in the Serbian Superliga. On 17 November 2011, it was announced that he is to join Lillestrøm SK for the 2012 season.

Following limited use with Vendsyssel in the 2013 season, Ramović joined Strømsgodset before the 2014 season, but retired from the team early in the season, on 21 May.

== International career ==
Ramović received his first call up for the Bosnia and Herzegovina national team in 2004. While he was included in the squad on several occasions, he never earned a cap.

== Managerial career ==
Ramović was appointed head coach of Tanzanian club Young Africans in November 2024, having previously managed South African side TS Galaxy. From February 2025 to April 2026 he was head coach of CR Belouizdad where he reached the semifinals of the 2025–26 CAF Confederation Cup.
