= Fredrik Stoor =

Swedish footballer (born 1984)

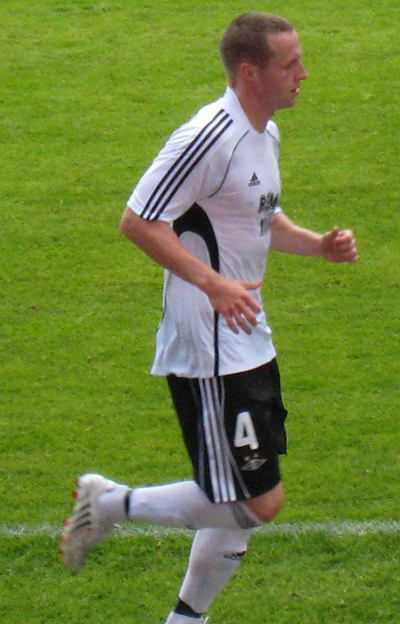
- Stoor in 2008

Personal information
- Full name: Fredrik Olof Esaias Stoor
- Date of birth: 28 February 1984 (age 42)
- Place of birth: Stockholm, Sweden
- Height: 1.83 m (6 ft 0 in)
- Position: Defender

Senior career*
| Years | Team | Apps | (Gls) |
| 2002–2006 | Hammarby IF | 51 | (2) |
| 2007–2008 | Rosenborg BK | 30 | (0) |
| 2008–2011 | Fulham | 4 | (0) |
| 2009 | → Derby County (loan) | 11 | (0) |
| 2011–2012 | Vålerenga | 15 | (0) |
| 2012 | → Lillestrøm SK (loan) | 21 | (0) |
| 2013 | Lillestrøm SK | 23 | (0) |
| 2014 | Viborg FF | 3 | (0) |
| 2015 | IF Brommapojkarna | 23 | (0) |
| Total | | 181 | (2) |

International career
| 2001 | Sweden U17 | 7 | (0) |
| 2003 | Sweden U19 | 3 | (0) |
| 2008 | Sweden | 11 | (0) |
- * Club domestic league appearances and goals

Fredrik Olof Esaias Stoor (born 28 February 1984) is a Swedish former professional footballer who played as a right-back. He was capped 11 times playing for Sweden, and played for Hammarby, Rosenborg, Fulham, Derby County, Vålerenga, Lillestrøm, Viborg FF, and IF Brommapojkarna. He represented Sweden at UEFA Euro 2008.

== Early life ==
Stoor was born in Sweden to Finnish parents from Vaasa, Esa Siekkinen and Margaret Stoor.

== Club career ==
=== Hammarby ===
Stoor was born in Stockholm, Sweden, and started playing with Hammarby, who he joined in 1996 at the age of 12 as a youth player. In January 2001, he had a trial with Manchester United. During his professional career at the club he made 51 appearances and scored two goals from defence.

=== Rosenborg ===
In December 2006, he joined Norwegian club Rosenborg and made 46 appearances for the first team, including seven appearances in European competition.

=== Fulham, and Derby County loan ===
Stoor joined Premier League club Fulham during the summer 2008 transfer window. He made his debut on 27 August 2008 against Leicester City, when he started in the League Cup second round tie.

In September 2009, Stoor joined Derby County for an initial one-month loan, appearing four times. He sufficiently impressed Derby for his loan to be extended for a further two months.

=== Return to Norway ===
Stoor returned to Norway in January 2011, when he signed for Vålerenga as a free agent. After playing 15 matches for Vålerenga in Tippeligaen, he was wanted by his former club Rosenborg ahead of the 2012 season, but he did not pass the medical test in Trondheim. Just before the Norwegian transfer window closed in March 2012, Stoor joined Lillestrøm on a season-long loan-deal. His contract with Vålerenga was terminated ahead of the 2013 season, and Stoor subsequently signed a one-year contract with Lillestrøm.

=== Viborg FF ===
On 23 January 2014, Stoor signed a six-month contract with Danish Superliga club Viborg FF, joining on a free transfer.

== International career ==
A full Swedish international in 2008, Stoor was part of the squad that took part in UEFA Euro 2008 and made 11 appearances for Sweden.

== Career statistics ==
As of 27 September 2013

Appearances and goals by club, season and competition
| Club | Season | League | | | Cup | | Total | |
| Club | Season | Division | Apps | Goals | Apps | Goals | Apps | Goals |
|---|---|---|---|---|---|---|---|---|
| Hammarby | 2002 | Allsvenskan | 0 | 0 | 0 | 0 | 0 | 0 |
| Hammarby | 2003 | Allsvenskan | 1 | 0 | 0 | 0 | 1 | 0 |
| Hammarby | 2004 | Allsvenskan | 7 | 0 | 0 | 0 | 7 | 0 |
| Hammarby | 2005 | Allsvenskan | 20 | 1 | 0 | 0 | 20 | 1 |
| Hammarby | 2006 | Allsvenskan | 23 | 1 | 0 | 0 | 23 | 1 |
| Hammarby | Total | | 51 | 2 | 0 | 0 | 51 | 2 |
| Rosenborg | 2007 | Tippeligaen | 21 | 0 | 4 | 0 | 25 | 0 |
| Rosenborg | 2008 | Tippeligaen | 9 | 0 | 0 | 0 | 9 | 0 |
| Rosenborg | Total | | 30 | 0 | 4 | 0 | 34 | 0 |
| Fulham | 2008–09 | Premier League | 2 | 0 | 5 | 0 | 7 | 0 |
| Fulham | 2009–10 | Premier League | 2 | 0 | 1 | 0 | 3 | 0 |
| Fulham | Total | | 4 | 0 | 6 | 0 | 10 | 0 |
| Derby (loan) | 2009–10 | The Championship | 11 | 0 | 0 | 0 | 11 | 0 |
| Vålerenga | 2011 | Tippeligaen | 15 | 0 | 1 | 0 | 16 | 0 |
| Lillestrøm | 2012 | Tippeligaen | 21 | 0 | 2 | 0 | 23 | 0 |
| Lillestrøm | 2013 | Tippeligaen | 23 | 0 | 5 | 0 | 28 | 0 |
| Lillestrøm | Total | | 44 | 0 | 7 | 0 | 51 | 0 |
| Career total | | | 155 | 2 | 18 | 0 | 173 | 2 |
