= Pálmi Rafn Pálmason =

Icelandic footballer

Pálmi Pálmason
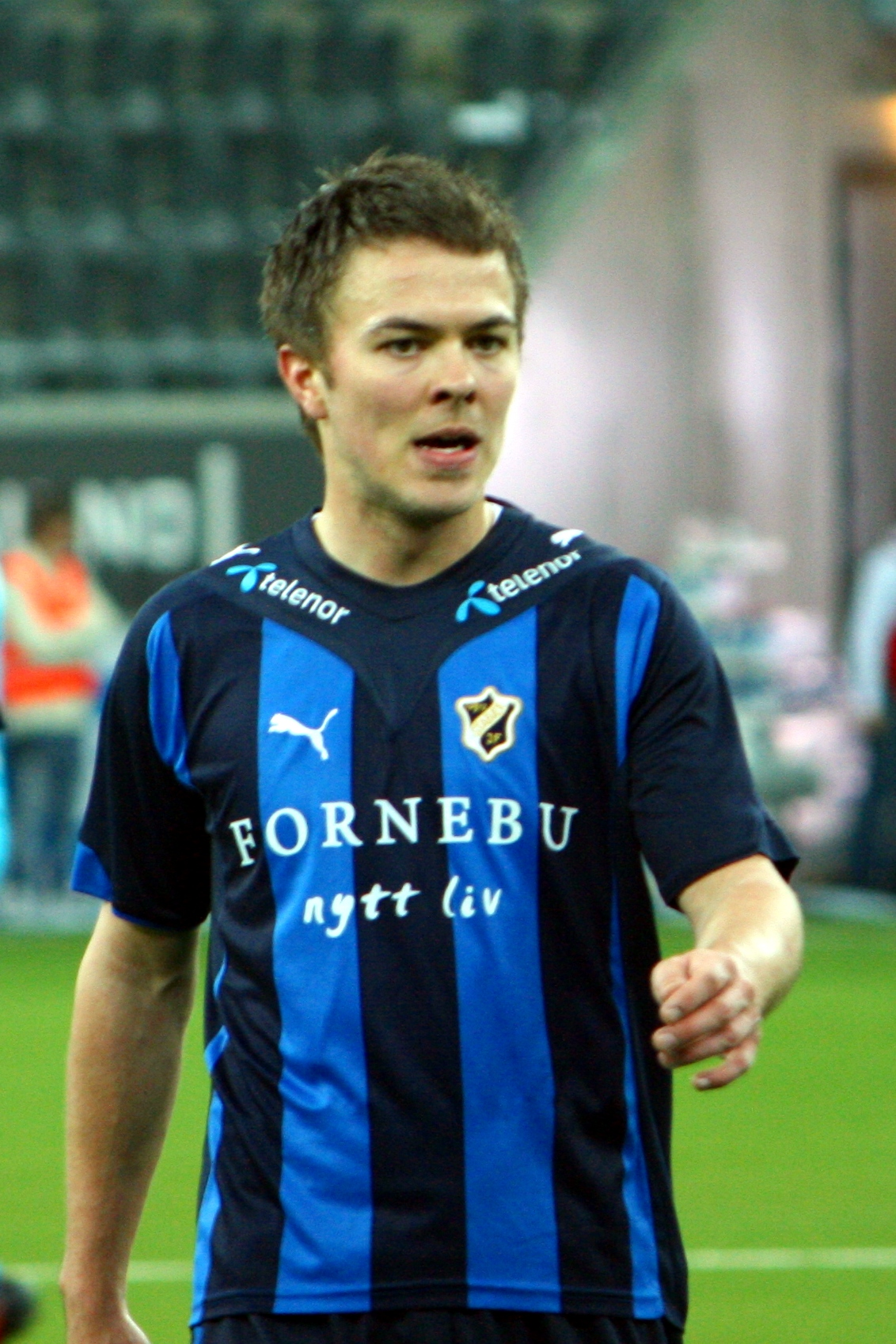

Personal information
- Full name: Pálmi Rafn Pálmason
- Date of birth: 9 November 1984 (age 41)
- Place of birth: Húsavík, Iceland
- Height: 1.85 m (6 ft 1 in)
- Position: Midfielder

Team information
- Current team: KR
- Number: 10

Youth career
- 2000: Völsungur

Senior career*
Years	Team	Apps	(Gls)
2001–2002	Völsungur	41	(13)
2003–2005	KA	49	(16)
2006–2008	Valur	48	(17)
2008–2011	Stabæk	81	(14)
2012–2014	Lillestrøm	85	(18)
2015–	KR	128	(29)

International career^{‡}
2001–2002	Iceland U-19	6	(0)
2004–2006	Iceland U-21	10	(1)
2008–	Iceland	18	(0)
- * Club domestic league appearances and goals as of 23 May 2021 ‡ National team caps and goals as of 14 November 2012

Pálmi Rafn Pálmason (born 9 November 1984) is an Icelandic footballer who is currently playing for KR in the Icelandic Premier Division. Before that he played in Iceland for Völsungur, KA and Valur, where he was a key player in the team that won the 2007 Úrvalsdeild, Valur's first league title in 20 years.

He was signed by Stabæk in July 2008 and became one of the heroes for them in the 2008-season when he headed in the 2–1 goal in overtime against the current league champions Brann at Brann Stadion and practically secured Stabæk's first league gold ever. This was his first league goal for Stabæk.

Pálmason made his debut for the Icelandic national team in a friendly against Belarus in February 2008. He was a regular member of the squad under former coach Ólafur Jóhannesson

== Personal life ==
Pálmi's mother was Björg Jónsdóttir, a former member of the Icelandic national handball team. Footballer Alexander Rafn Pálmason is Pálmi's son.

== Career statistics ==
=== Club ===
As of match played 2 May 2021

Appearances and goals by club, season and competition
Club	Season	League			National Cup		Continental		Other		Total	
Club	Season	Division	Apps	Goals	Apps	Goals	Apps	Goals	Apps	Goals	Apps	Goals
Stabæk	2008	Tippeligaen	9	2	0	0	2	0	-		11	2
Stabæk	2009	Tippeligaen	25	3	5	4	4	1	1	1	35	9
Stabæk	2010	Tippeligaen	21	1	0	0	1	0	-		22	1
Stabæk	2011	Tippeligaen	26	8	3	2	-		-		29	10
Stabæk	Total		81	14	8	6	7	1	1	1	97	22
Lillestrøm	2012	Tippeligaen	28	6	4	1	-		-		32	7
Lillestrøm	2013	Tippeligaen	30	3	6	4	-		-		36	7
Lillestrøm	2014	Tippeligaen	27	9	2	0	-		-		29	9
Lillestrøm	Total		85	18	12	5	-	-	-	-	97	23
KR	2015	Úrvalsdeild	21	3	5	3	4	1	1	0	31	7
KR	2016	Úrvalsdeild	20	2	1	0	4	1	-		25	3
KR	2017	Úrvalsdeild	21	2	3	0	4	2	-		28	4
KR	2018	Úrvalsdeild	22	11	2	0	-		-		24	11
KR	2019	Úrvalsdeild	22	8	4	0	2	0	-		28	8
KR	2020	Úrvalsdeild	17	1	3	0	2	0	1	0	23	1
KR	2021	Úrvalsdeild	1	0	0	0	-		-		1	0
KR	Total		124	27	18	3	16	4	2	0	160	34
Career total			249	50	29	14	19	5	1	1	298	70
