= 2009 Lillestrøm SK season =

Lillestrøm
2009 season
- Chairman: Per Mathisen
- Head coach: Henning Berg
- Stadium: Åråsen Stadion
- Tippeligaen: 11th
- Norwegian Cup: Fourth round vs Stabæk
- Top goalscorer: League: Arild Sundgot (11); All: Arild Sundgot (11)
- Highest home attendance: 10,287 vs Vålerenga; 13 April 2009
- Lowest home attendance: 6,334 vs Lyn; 4 October 2009
- Average home league attendance: 7,602

The 2009 season was Lillestrøm SK's 19th season in the Tippeligaen, and their 34th consecutive season in the top division of Norwegian football.

== Squad ==
As of 7 September 2009

Note: Flags indicate national team as defined under FIFA eligibility rules; some limited exceptions apply. Players may hold more than one non-FIFA nationality.

No.	Pos.	Nation	Player
1	GK	FIN	Otto Fredrikson
2	DF	NOR	Steinar Pedersen
3	DF	NOR	Lars Kristian Eriksen
4	DF	JAM	Adrian Reid (on loan from Portmore)
6	MF	CIV	Alhassane Dosso
8	FW	ISL	Björn Bergmann Sigurdarson
11	FW	NOR	Magnus Waade Myklebust
12	GK	ISL	Stefán Logi Magnússon
13	DF	NOR	Frode Kippe (captain)
14	FW	NGA	Edwin Eziyodawe
15	DF	NOR	Marius Johnsen
16	FW	NGA	Nosakhare Emmanuel Igiebor

No.	Pos.	Nation	Player
17	MF	SVK	Martin Husár
18	FW	NOR	Arild Sundgot
19	MF	NOR	Fredrik Gulbrandsen
20	DF	NOR	Stian Ringstad
21	DF	TUN	Karim Essediri
22	MF	NOR	Kristoffer Tokstad
23	DF	NOR	Pål Steffen Andresen
25	MF	TUN	Khaled Mouelhi
26	MF	NOR	Mathis Bolly
28	DF	NOR	Ruben Gabrielsen
30	FW	CAN	Olivier Occean

=== Out on loan ===
Note: Flags indicate national team as defined under FIFA eligibility rules; some limited exceptions apply. Players may hold more than one non-FIFA nationality.

No.	Pos.	Nation	Player
—	DF	NOR	Vidar Riseth (to Strømsgodset IF)
—	FW	NOR	Tore Andreas Gundersen (to Nybergsund IL)
—	GK	NOR	André Hansen (to KR Reykjavík)
—	GK	NOR	Lars Ivar Moldskred (to Strømsgodset IF)

No.	Pos.	Nation	Player
—	DF	NOR	Eirik Bertheussen (to Tromsdalen UIL)
—	MF	NOR	Dan Alberto Fellus (to Bærum SK)

== Pre-season and friendlies ==
15 January 2009	Lillestrøm	1–0	Nybergsund	Lillestrøm
	Arnarsson 75'			Stadium: LSK-Hallen; Attendance: 322; Referee: Espen Stav Hansen

24 January 2009	Lillestrøm	2–0	HamKam	Lillestrøm
	Bolly 52'; Mouelhi 74' (pen.)			Stadium: LSK-Hallen; Attendance: 1,632; Referee: Mads Ahlsen

30 January 2009	Lillestrøm	2–1	Odd Grenland	Lillestrøm
	Sundgot 63', 87' (pen.)		Bentley 10'	Stadium: LSK-Hallen; Attendance: 1,042; Referee: Tom Harald Hagen

11 February 2009	Real Murcia (Spain)	2–0	(Norway) Lillestrøm	La Manga, Spain
	Sikora 9'; Capdevila 88'			Stadium: Bane A Attendance: 100

17 February 2009	Lillestrøm (Norway)	5–2	(Russia) Rubin Kazan	La Manga, Spain
	Mouelhi 3', 77' (pen.); Sundgot 14'; Myklebust 18'; Occean 39'		Bukharov 30'; Portnyagin 90'	Stadium: Bane A Attendance: 150; Referee: Terje Hauge

24 February 2009	Lillestrøm	1–3	Tromsø	Lillestrøm
	Gundersen 29'		Lindpere 9'; Larsen 27'; Moldskred 35'	Stadium: LSK-Hallen; Attendance: 318; Referee: Espen Stav Hansen

28 February 2009	Lillestrøm	4–3	Molde	Lillestrøm
	Occean 62', 89'; Riise 79'; Sundgot 83'		Diouf 29', 52'; Forren 67'	Stadium: LSK-Hallen; Attendance: 642

8 March 2009	Lillestrøm (Norway)	0–1	(Sweden) Elfsborg	Marbella, Spain
			Svensson 45'	Stadium: Marpafut; Attendance: 37; Referee: Gaspar Troyano (Spain)

28 March 2009	IFK Göteborg (Sweden)	1–2	(Norway) Lillestrøm	Gothenburg, Sweden
	Atashkadeh 26'		Myklebust 22'; Occean 45'	Stadium: Backavallen konstgräs Attendance: 719; Referee: Mikael Lerjéus (Sweden)

6 August 2009	Lillestrøm (Norway)	1–0	(Jamaica) Portmore United	Lillestrøm
12:00	Myklebust			Stadium: Åråsen Stadion

== Competitions ==
=== Tippeligaen ===
==== Results summary ====
Overall								Home						Away					
Pld	W	D	L	GF	GA	GD	Pts	W	D	L	GF	GA	GD	W	D	L	GF	GA	GD
30	9	10	11	43	50	−7	37	6	5	4	26	22	+4	3	5	7	17	28	−11

==== Results by round ====
Round	1	2	3	4	5	6	7	8	9	10	11	12	13	14	15	16	17	18	19	20	21	22	23	24	25	26	27	28	29	30
Ground	A	H	A	H	A	H	A	A	H	A	H	A	H	A	H	H	A	H	A	H	A	H	H	A	H	A	H	A	H	A
Result	D	D	L	L	D	L	L	L	D	W	W	D	W	D	L	W	L	D	L	D	W	W	L	W	D	L	W	D	W	L
Position	7	8	12	14	14	16	16	16	16	16	14	15	13	11	12	12	13	12	13	14	11	10	11	10	11	12	11	12	9	11

Updated to match(es) played on 1 November 2009. Source: see below
A = Away; H = Home; W = Win; D = Draw; L = Loss

==== Results ====
14 March 2009 1	Stabæk	1–1	Lillestrøm	Bærum
20:00	Pálmason 65'	Report	Sundgot 53'	Stadium: Telenor Arena; Attendance: 10,737; Referee: Espen Berntsen

22 March 2009 2	Lillestrøm	1–1	Viking	Lillestrøm
18:00	Occean 54'	Report	Skogseid 65'	Stadium: Åråsen Stadion; Attendance: 8,117; Referee: Terje Hauge

5 April 2009 3	Aalesund	3–1	Lillestrøm	Ålesund
18:00	Aarøy 8', 58'; Skiri 36'	Report	Riise 52'	Stadium: Color Line Stadion; Attendance: 10,579; Referee: Kjetil Sælen

13 April 2009 4	Lillestrøm	1–2	Vålerenga	Lillestrøm
20:00	Kippe 90'	Report	Occean 23' (o.g.); Abdellaoue 80'	Stadium: Åråsen Stadion; Attendance: 10,287; Referee: Tommy Skjerven

18 April 2009 5	Tromsø	1–1	Lillestrøm	Tromsø
16:00	Strand 61'	Report	Eziyodawe 87'	Stadium: Alfheim Stadion; Attendance: 4,998; Referee: Kristoffer Helgerud

26 April 2009 6	Lillestrøm	1–2	Rosenborg	Lillestrøm
20:00	Riise 55'	Report	Prica 81'; Sapara 89'	Stadium: Åråsen Stadion; Attendance: 10,151; Referee: Tom Henning Øvrebø

30 April 2009 7	Brann	3–1	Lillestrøm	Bergen
19:00	Nielsen 45+1'; Huseklepp 51'; Moen 72'	Report	Riise 64'	Stadium: Brann Stadion; Attendance: 15,991; Referee: Roy Helge Olsen

6 May 2009 8	Start	3–0	Lillestrøm	Kristiansand
19:00	A. Hansen 6' (o.g.); Hulsker 36'; Khalili 89'	Report		Stadium: Sør Arena; Attendance: 8,877; Referee: Tommy Skjerven

16 May 2009 9	Lillestrøm	1–1	Odd Grenland	Lillestrøm
18:00	Sundgot 65'	Report	Bentley 86'	Stadium: Åråsen Stadion; Attendance: 8,042; Referee: Kristoffer Helgerud

21 May 2009 10	Strømsgodset	1–2	Lillestrøm	Drammen
18:00	Nordkvelle 4'	Report	Nosa 16'; Sundgot 22'	Stadium: Marienlyst Stadion; Attendance: 5,803; Referee: Svein Oddvar Moen

24 May 2009 11	Lillestrøm	2–1	Sandefjord	Lillestrøm
18:00	Sundgot 5', 29'	Report	Mjelde 40'	Stadium: Åråsen Stadion; Attendance: 6,990; Referee: Per Ivar Staberg

1 June 2009 12	Lyn	1–1	Lillestrøm	Oslo
18:00	Pratto 74'	Report	Johnsen 39'	Stadium: Ullevaal Stadion; Attendance: 4,286; Referee: Espen Berntsen

14 June 2009 13	Lillestrøm	4–2	Fredrikstad	Lillestrøm
18:00	Søgård 9'; Eziyodawe 24', 68'; Kippe 42'	Report	Borges 13'; Everton 31'	Stadium: Åråsen Stadion; Attendance: 7,737; Referee: Tom Henning Øvrebø

21 June 2009 14	Bodø/Glimt	1–1	Lillestrøm	Bodø
18:00	Stensland 41'	Report	Riise 20'	Stadium: Aspmyra Stadion; Attendance: 3,568; Referee: Per Ivar Staberg

25 June 2009 15	Lillestrøm	0–1	Molde	Lillestrøm
19:00		Report	Ertsås 90+4'	Stadium: Åråsen Stadion; Attendance: 7,329; Referee: Svein Oddvar Moen

1 July 2009 16	Lillestrøm	3–2	Start	Lillestrøm
18:00	Sundgot 27' (pen.); Riise 56'; Myklebust 61'	Report	Hulsker 81'	Stadium: Åråsen Stadion; Attendance: 6,651; Referee: Tommy Skjerven

5 July 2009 17	Viking	4–2	Lillestrøm	Stavanger
18:00	Bjarnason 12', 76'; Skogseid 36'; Sokolowski 89'	Report	Sundgot 47'; Riise 83'	Stadium: Viking Stadion; Attendance: 11,984; Referee: Terje Hauge

12 July 2009 18	Lillestrøm	1–1	Aalesund	Lillestrøm
18:00	Eziyodawe 66'	Report	Kopteff 40'	Stadium: Åråsen Stadion; Attendance: 6,907; Referee: Ken Henry Johnsen

26 July 2009 19	Rosenborg	2–1	Lillestrøm	Trondheim
20:00	Lustig 43'; Iversen 86' (pen.)	Report	Eziyodawe 10'	Stadium: Lerkendal Stadion; Attendance: 16,426; Referee: Roy Helge Olsen

2 August 2009 20	Lillestrøm	2–2	Tromsø	Lillestrøm
18:00	Occean 60'; Sundgot 62'	Report	Reginiussen 2'; Strand 35'	Stadium: Åråsen Stadion; Attendance: 6,775; Referee: Tom Henning Øvrebø

16 August 2009 21	Vålerenga	0–1	Lillestrøm	Oslo
20:00		Report	Kippe 87'	Stadium: Ullevaal Stadion; Attendance: 11,622; Referee: Svein Oddvar Moen

22 August 2009 22	Lillestrøm	2–1	Strømsgodset	Lillestrøm
16:00	Pedersen 17'; Eziyodawe 23'	Report	Storflor 73'	Stadium: Åråsen Stadion; Attendance: 6,436; Referee: Terje Hauge

31 August 2009 23	Lillestrøm	1–2	Stabæk	Lillestrøm
19:00	Johnsen 86'	Report	Høiland 31', 90+2'	Stadium: Åråsen Stadion; Attendance: 6,543; Referee: Svein Oddvar Moen

13 September 2009 24	Odd Grenland	2–3	Lillestrøm	Skien
18:00	Kovacs 31'; Fevang 75' (pen.)	Report	T. Hansen 14' (o.g.); Kippe 40'; Sundgot 73' (pen.)	Stadium: Skagerak Arena; Attendance: 7,071; Referee: Kjetil Sælen

20 September 2009 25	Lillestrøm	2–2	Bodø/Glimt	Lillestrøm
18:00	Nosa 7'; Sigurðarson 77'	Report	T. Rønning 37'; Johansen 45+4'	Stadium: Åråsen Stadion; Attendance: 7,149; Referee: Tom Harald Hagen

26 September 2009 26	Fredrikstad	1–0	Lillestrøm	Fredrikstad
18:00	Andersson 84'	Report		Stadium: Fredrikstad Stadion; Attendance: 10,583; Referee: Tom Henning Øvrebø

4 October 2009 27	Lillestrøm	2–1	Lyn	Lillestrøm
18:00	Sundgot 44'; Risser 68' (o.g.)	Report	van den Burgt 12'	Stadium: Åråsen Stadion; Attendance: 6,334; Referee: Svein Erik Edvartsen

18 October 2009 28	Sandefjord	2–2	Lillestrøm	Sandefjord
18:00	Røyrane 24'; Mane 85'	Report	Nosa 21'; Sundgot 55' (pen.)	Stadium: Komplett.no Arena; Attendance: 5,502; Referee: Tommy Skjerven

25 October 2009 29	Lillestrøm	3–1	Brann	Lillestrøm
18:00	Pedersen 7'; Kippe 45+2'; Søgård 77'	Report	Austin 48'	Stadium: Åråsen Stadion; Attendance: 8,585; Referee: Per Ivar Staberg

1 November 2009 30	Molde	3–0	Lillestrøm	Molde
18:00	Diouf 39'; Hoseth 53'; Forren 69'	Report		Stadium: Aker Stadion; Attendance: 7,383; Referee: Svein Oddvar Moen

==== Table ====
Pos	Team	Pld	W	D	L	GF	GA	GD	Pts	Qualification or relegation
9	Start	30	10	10	10	46	52	−6	40	
10	Viking	30	9	11	10	38	40	−2	38	
11	Lillestrøm	30	9	10	11	43	50	−7	37	
12	Strømsgodset	30	10	6	14	40	42	−2	36	
13	Aalesund	30	9	9	12	34	43	−9	36	Qualification for the Europa League third qualifying round (Note: Aalesund won the 2009 Norwegian Cup and qualified for the third qualifying round of the UEFA Europa League.)

Source: fotball.no
Rules for classification: 1) points; 2) goal difference; 3) number of goals scored.

=== Norwegian Cup ===
10 May 2009 First Round	Østsiden	2–3	Lillestrøm	Fredrikstad
18:00	K. Hansen 14'; Magnussen 89'	Report	Johnsen 23'; Nosa 63', 79'	Stadium: Østsiden Stadion; Attendance: 550; Referee: Ola Hobber Nilsen

27 May 2009 Second Round	Strømmen	1–2 (a.e.t.)	Lillestrøm	Strømmen
18:00	Haugstad 34'	Report	Eziyodawe 10'; Nosa 117'	Stadium: Strømmen Stadion; Attendance: 2,835; Referee: Kristoffer Leirdal

17 June 2009 Third Round	Asker	0–3	Lillestrøm	Asker
18:00		Report	Søgård 60'; Gulbrandsen 65'; Kippe 86'	Stadium: Føyka Stadion; Attendance: 1,712; Referee: Bjørn Hansen

8 July 2009 Fourth Round	Stabæk	4–0	Lillestrøm	Bærum
19:00	Berglund 40', 71', 77', 90+2'	Report		Stadium: Telenor Arena; Attendance: 3,788; Referee: Kjetil Sælen
