= 2010 Lillestrøm SK season =

Lillestrøm SK 2010 football season in the Tippeligaen

Lillestrøm
2010 season
- Chairman: Per Mathisen
- Head coach: Henning Berg
- Stadium: Åråsen Stadion
- Tippeligaen: 10th
- Norwegian Cup: Third round vs Follo
- Top goalscorer: League: Anthony Ujah (14); All: Anthony Ujah (17)
- Highest home attendance: 11,022 vs Vålerenga; 4 July 2010
- Lowest home attendance: 5,117 vs Molde; 25 September 2010
- Average home league attendance: 6,611

The 2010 season was Lillestrøm SK's 20th season in the Tippeligaen, and their 36th consecutive season in the top division of Norwegian football.

== Squad ==
As of 9 August 2010

Note: Flags indicate national team as defined under FIFA eligibility rules; some limited exceptions apply. Players may hold more than one non-FIFA nationality.

No.	Pos.	Nation	Player
1	GK	NOR	Andreas Fjeldstad
2	DF	NOR	Steinar Pedersen
3	DF	NOR	Lars Kristian Eriksen
4	DF	NOR	Mads Dahm
5	MF	NOR	Tom Sadeh
7	MF	NOR	Espen Søgård
8	FW	ISL	Björn Bergmann Sigurðarson
9	FW	NGA	Anthony Ujah
10	MF	NGA	Emanuell Nosakhare Igiebor
11	MF	NOR	Erling Knudtzon
12	GK	ISL	Stefán Logi Magnússon
13	DF	NOR	Frode Kippe (captain)
14	FW	NGA	Edwin Eziyodawe

No.	Pos.	Nation	Player
15	DF	NOR	Marius Johnsen
16	FW	NOR	Ohi Omoijuanfo
18	FW	NOR	Arild Sundgot
19	FW	NOR	Fredrik Gulbrandsen
20	DF	NOR	Stian Ringstad
21	DF	TUN	Karim Essediri
22	MF	NOR	Kristoffer Tokstad
23	DF	NOR	Pål Steffen Andresen
25	MF	TUN	Khaled Mouelhi
26	MF	NOR	Mathis Bolly
28	DF	NOR	Ruben Gabrielsen
29	GK	NOR	André Hansen

=== Out on loan ===
Note: Flags indicate national team as defined under FIFA eligibility rules; some limited exceptions apply. Players may hold more than one non-FIFA nationality.

No.	Pos.	Nation	Player
6	MF	CIV	Alhassane Dosso (at Strømmen IF until December 2010)
—	FW	NOR	Dan Alberto Fellus (at Bærum SK until December 2010)

=== Transfers ===
In: Note: Flags indicate national team as defined under FIFA eligibility rules; some limited exceptions apply. Players may hold more than one non-FIFA nationality.

No.	Pos.	Nation	Player
—	DF	ISL	Viktor Bjarki Arnarsson (loan return from Nybergsund IL-Trysil)
—	MF	NOR	Erling Knudtzon (loan from Lyn)
—	FW	NOR	Tarik Elyounoussi (loan from SC Heerenveen)
—	FW	NGA	Anthony Ujah (loan from Warri Wolves)

Out: Note: Flags indicate national team as defined under FIFA eligibility rules; some limited exceptions apply. Players may hold more than one non-FIFA nationality.

No.	Pos.	Nation	Player
4	DF	JAM	Adrian Reid (loan return to Portmore)
—	FW	NOR	Tore Andreas Gundersen (to Dynamo Dresden)

== Pre-season and friendlies ==
15 January 2010	Lillestrøm	3–0	Nybergsund	Lillestrøm
14:30	Occean 1', 63'; Eziyodawe 35'	Report		Stadium: LSK-Hallen; Attendance: 422; Referee: Tom Harald Hagen

23 January 2010	Lillestrøm	2–0	Strømmen	Lillestrøm
14:00	Ujah 53'; Kippe 77'	Report		Stadium: LSK-Hallen; Attendance: 1,048; Referee: Espen Stav Hansen

29 January 2010	Lillestrøm (Norway)	1–0	(Sweden) GAIS	Lillestrøm
16:00	Occean 21'	Report		Stadium: LSK-Hallen; Attendance: 503; Referee: Omar Rafiq

7 February 2010	Lillestrøm (Norway)	0–0	(Poland) Polonia Warsaw	La Manga, Spain
18:00				Attendance: 100; Referee: Brage Sandmoen

12 February 2010	Lillestrøm (Norway)	3–2	(Russia) Zenit St. Petersburg	La Manga, Spain
18:00	Nosa 16'; Eriksen 49'; Sigurðarson 79'		Kerzhakov 62'; Matyash 90'	Attendance: 150; Referee: Kjetil Sælen

20 February 2010	Lillestrøm	3–3	Fredrikstad	Lillestrøm
12:00	Ringstad 57'; Ujah 64'; Johnsen 87'	Report	Tegström 16'; Borges 23', 79'	Stadium: LSK-Hallen; Attendance: 750; Referee: Trond Ivar Døvle

26 February 2010	Lillestrøm	2–0	Strømsgodset	Lillestrøm
16:00	Ujah 27'; Sundgot 45'	Report		Stadium: LSK-Hallen; Referee: Trond Ivar Døvle

5 March 2010	Odd Grenland	2–1	Lillestrøm	Skien
17:00	Simen Brenne 12'; Magnus Myklebust 60'	Report	Nosa 70'	Stadium: Skagerak Arena; Attendance: 605; Referee: Roy Helge Olsen

26 June 2010	Copenhagen (Denmark)	0–2	(Norway) Lillestrøm	Copenhagen, Denmark
16:00		Report	Mouelhi 54' (pen.); Eziyodawe 86'	Stadium: Nummer 10; Attendance: 400; Referee: Henrik N. Kragh

== Competitions ==
=== Tippeligaen ===
==== Results summary ====
Overall								Home						Away					
Pld	W	D	L	GF	GA	GD	Pts	W	D	L	GF	GA	GD	W	D	L	GF	GA	GD
30	9	13	8	51	44	+7	40	7	6	2	31	18	+13	2	7	6	20	26	−6

==== Results by round ====
Round	1	2	3	4	5	6	7	8	9	10	11	12	13	14	15	16	17	18	19	20	21	22	23	24	25	26	27	28	29	30
Ground	A	H	H	A	H	A	H	A	H	A	H	A	H	A	H	H	A	A	H	A	H	A	H	A	H	A	H	A	H	A
Result	L	W	W	D	D	D	D	D	W	W	W	D	D	D	L	L	D	L	D	L	W	L	W	D	D	W	W	L	D	L
Position	16	11	3	5	6	7	7	8	7	4	3	4	4	4	5	6	8	9	8	10	9	11	10	10	10	10	7	9	9	10

Updated to match(es) played on 7 November 2010. Source: see below
A = Away; H = Home; W = Win; D = Draw; L = Loss

==== Results ====
14 March 2010 1	Aalesund	3–0	Lillestrøm	Ålesund
18:00	Arnefjord 14'; Aarøy 48'; Silva 90'	Report		Stadium: Color Line Stadion; Attendance: 9,656; Referee: Svein Oddvar Moen

21 March 2010 2	Lillestrøm	2–0	Tromsø	Lillestrøm
18:00	Sundgot 7'; Ujah 13'	Report		Stadium: Åråsen Stadion; Attendance: 6,047; Referee: Terje Hauge

28 March 2010 3	Lillestrøm	6–0	Hønefoss	Lillestrøm
18:00	Kippe 7', 37'; Ujah 15'; Pedersen 24'; Elyounoussi 49'; Sundgot 57'	Report		Stadium: Åråsen Stadion; Attendance: 5,824; Referee: Espen Berntsen

5 April 2010 4	Viking	0–0	Lillestrøm	Stavanger
18:00		Report		Stadium: Viking Stadion; Attendance: 12,463; Referee: Tommy Skjerven

10 April 2010 5	Lillestrøm	0–0	Stabæk	Lillestrøm
17:00		Report		Stadium: Åråsen Stadion; Attendance: 7,237; Referee: Svein Oddvar Moen

14 April 2010 6	Kongsvinger	0–0	Lillestrøm	Kongsvinger
19:00		Report		Stadium: Gjemselund Stadion; Attendance: 4,017; Referee: Tom Henning Øvrebø

18 April 2010 7	Lillestrøm	1–1	Haugesund	Lillestrøm
18:00	Nsaliwa 50'	Report	Pozniak 13'	Stadium: Åråsen Stadion; Attendance: 5,553; Referee: Dag Vidar Hafsås

25 April 2010 8	Rosenborg	0–0	Lillestrøm	Trondheim
20:00		Report		Stadium: Lerkendal Stadion; Attendance: 17,104; Referee: Tom Henning Øvrebø

2 May 2010 9	Lillestrøm	4–0	Sandefjord	Lillestrøm
18:00	Pedersen 20'; Sigurðarson 61'; Elyounoussi 82'; Occean 90+1'	Report		Stadium: Åråsen Stadion; Attendance: 6,616; Referee: Tom Harald Hagen

6 May 2010 10	Start	2–3	Lillestrøm	Kristiansand
18:00	Mathisen 6'; Stokkelien 19'	Report	Sundgot 59', 81'; Sigurðarson 71'	Stadium: Sør Arena; Attendance: 7,342; Referee: Svein Oddvar Moen

9 May 2010 11	Lillestrøm	3–1	Strømsgodset	Lillestrøm
18:00	Pedersen 12'; Nosa 19'; Sigurðarson 71'	Report	Eriksen 79' (o.g.)	Stadium: Åråsen Stadion; Attendance: 6,776; Referee: Terje Hauge

16 May 2010 12	Brann	1–1	Lillestrøm	Bergen
20:00	Moen 90+6'	Report	Nosa 50'	Stadium: Brann Stadion; Attendance: 17,085; Referee: Tommy Skjerven

25 May 2010 13	Lillestrøm	2–2	Odd Grenland	Lillestrøm
19:00	Elyounoussi 43'; Mouelhi 60' (pen.)	Report	Kovacs 17'; Fevang 29' (pen.)	Stadium: Åråsen Stadion; Attendance: 6,025; Referee: Brage Sandmoen

6 June 2010 14	Molde	3–3	Lillestrøm	Molde
18:00	Fall 16', 70'; Skjølsvik 56'	Report	Kippe 90'; Elyounoussi 90+2'; Ujah 90+4'	Stadium: Aker Stadion; Attendance: 9,142; Referee: Svein Oddvar Moen

4 July 2010 15	Lillestrøm	1–4	Vålerenga	Lillestrøm
20:00	Ujah 90+2'	Report	Abdellaoue 57', 61'; Shelton 60', 76'	Stadium: Åråsen Stadion; Attendance: 11,022; Referee: Svein Oddvar Moen

10 July 2010 16	Lillestrøm	1–2	Rosenborg	Lillestrøm
18:00	Ujah 33'	Report	Lustig 29'; Dorsin 90+3'	Stadium: Åråsen Stadion; Attendance: 7,935; Referee: Tommy Skjerven

19 July 2010 17	Tromsø	0–0	Lillestrøm	Tromsø
19:00		Report		Stadium: Alfheim Stadion; Attendance: 4,394; Referee: Terje Hauge

26 July 2010 18	Hønefoss	3–2	Lillestrøm	Hønefoss
19:00	Obiefule 33' (pen.); Angan 45+1'; Steffensen 62'	Report	Kippe 45+4'; Ujah 53'	Stadium: AKA Arena; Attendance: 3,104; Referee: Ken Henry Johnsen

31 July 2010 19	Lillestrøm	2–2	Kongsvinger	Lillestrøm
17:00	Sigurðarson 66'; Ujah 84'	Report	Güven 50'; Johannesen 59'	Stadium: Åråsen Stadion; Attendance: 5,417; Referee: Tom Henning Øvrebø

9 August 2010 20	Odd Grenland	2–1	Lillestrøm	Skien
19:00	Bentley 54', 58'	Report	Sundgot 47'	Stadium: Skagerak Arena; Attendance: 5,634; Referee: Terje Hauge

22 August 2010 21	Lillestrøm	1–0	Aalesund	Lillestrøm
18:00	Eziyodawe 63'	Report		Stadium: Åråsen Stadion; Attendance: 6,623; Referee: Roy Helge Olsen

29 August 2010 22	Stabæk	2–1	Lillestrøm	Bærum
18:00	Farnerud 12'; Diskerud 44'	Report	Ujah 55'	Stadium: Telenor Arena; Attendance: 8,549; Referee: Kristoffer Helgerud

12 September 2010 23	Lillestrøm	3–2	Start	Lillestrøm
18:00	Kippe 32'; Mouelhi 45+2' (pen.); Ujah 56'	Report	Vikstøl 5'; Børufsen 40'	Stadium: Åråsen Stadion; Attendance: 6,702; Referee: Brage Sandmoen

20 September 2010 24	Haugesund	3–3	Lillestrøm	Haugesund
19:00	Đurđić 45', 47'; Tronseth 72'	Report	Sundgot 38'; Mouelhi 54'; Kippe 63'	Stadium: Haugesund Stadion; Attendance: 4,202; Referee: Svein Erik Edvartsen

25 September 2010 25	Lillestrøm	1–1	Molde	Lillestrøm
17:00	Ujah 52'	Report	Fall 87'	Stadium: Åråsen Stadion; Attendance: 5,117; Referee: Per Ivar Staberg

3 October 2010 26	Sandefjord	0–1	Lillestrøm	Sandefjord
18:00		Report	Bolly 30'	Stadium: Komplett.no Arena; Attendance: 1,142; Referee: Espen Berntsen

17 October 2010 27	Lillestrøm	3–2	Brann	Lillestrøm
18:00	Søgård 31'; Ujah 37'; Kippe 40'	Report	Moen 60'; Huseklepp 69'	Stadium: Åråsen Stadion; Attendance: 6,806; Referee: Kristoffer Helgerud

23 October 2010 28	Vålerenga	2–1	Lillestrøm	Oslo
17:00	Shelton 12'; Sæternes 90+3'	Report	Essediri 82'	Stadium: Ullevaal Stadion; Attendance: 17,096; Referee: Tommy Skjerven

31 October 2010 29	Lillestrøm	1–1	Viking	Lillestrøm
18:00	Sundgot 81'	Report	Berisha 40'	Stadium: Åråsen Stadion; Attendance: 5,466; Referee: Svein Erik Edvartsen

7 November 2010 30	Strømsgodset	5–4	Lillestrøm	Drammen
18:00	Berget 12', 19'; Kamara 53'; Vilsvik 66' (pen.); Rnkovic 70'	Report	Omoijuanfo 22'; Ujah 38', 78' (pen.), 87'	Stadium: Marienlyst Stadion; Attendance: 5,090; Referee: Espen Berntsen

==== Table ====
Pos	Team	Pld	W	D	L	GF	GA	GD	Pts
8	Start	30	11	9	10	57	60	−3	42
9	Viking	30	10	11	9	48	41	+7	41
10	Lillestrøm	30	9	13	8	51	44	+7	40
11	Molde	30	10	10	10	42	45	−3	40
12	Stabæk	30	11	6	13	46	47	−1	39

Source: fotball.no
Rules for classification: 1) points; 2) goal difference; 3) number of goals scored.

=== Norwegian Cup ===
13 May 2010 First Round	Hauerseter	0–5	Lillestrøm	Hauerseter
18:00		Report	Westad 18' (o.g.); Occean 36'; Essediri 78'; Ujah 85'; Tokstad 89'	Stadium: Nordkisa Idrettspark; Attendance: 2,650; Referee: Anders Hauglund

19 May 2010 Second Round	Brumunddal	1–6	Lillestrøm	Brumunddal
18:00	Johansen 65'	Report	Elyounoussi 19'; Sundgot 21', 42' (pen.); Ujah 34', 87'; Pedersen 50'	Stadium: Sveum Idrettspark; Attendance: 1,473; Referee: Anders Gjermshus

9 June 2010 Third Round	Follo	4–2	Lillestrøm	Ski
18:00	Tveter 26', 39'; Markegård 30'; Bwamy 68'	Report	Nosa 52'; Elyounoussi 84'	Stadium: Ski Stadion; Attendance: 1,163; Referee: Svein Erik Edvartsen
