= 2008 Lillestrøm SK season =

Lillestrøm
2008 season
- Chairman: Per Mathisen
- Head coach: Tom Nordlie (Until 29 May); Erland Johnsen (caretaker) (29 May - 21 October); Henning Berg (From 21 October)
- Stadium: Åråsen Stadion
- Tippeligaen: 12th
- Norwegian Cup: Second round vs Eidsvold Turn
- UEFA Cup: 2nd Qualifying Round vs Copenhagen
- Top goalscorer: League: Olivier Occean (11); All: Olivier Occean (13)
- Highest home attendance: 11,464 vs Rosenborg; 26 October 2008
- Lowest home attendance: 7,014 vs Bodø/Glimt; 20 July 2008

The 2008 season was Lillestrøm SK's 18th season in the Tippeligaen, and their 33rd consecutive season in the top division of Norwegian football.

== Squad ==
As of 21 August 2008

Note: Flags indicate national team as defined under FIFA eligibility rules; some limited exceptions apply. Players may hold more than one non-FIFA nationality.

No.	Pos.	Nation	Player
1	GK	(Finland) FIN	Otto Fredrikson
2	DF	(Norway) NOR	Steinar Pedersen
4	DF	(Norway) NOR	Eirik Bertheussen
5	MF	(Norway) NOR	John Anders Bjørkøy
6	DF	(Norway) NOR	Ståle Stensaas
7	MF	(Norway) NOR	Espen Søgård
9	MF	(Norway) NOR	Vidar Riseth
10	MF	(Norway) NOR	Bjørn Helge Riise
11	FW	(Norway) NOR	Magnus Waade Myklebust
12	GK	(Norway) NOR	Lars Ivar Moldskred
13	DF	(Norway) NOR	Frode Kippe (captain)

No.	Pos.	Nation	Player
14	MF	(Norway) NOR	Simen Brenne
15	DF	(Norway) NOR	Marius Johnsen
17	FW	(Norway) NOR	Jon Midttun Lie
18	FW	(Norway) NOR	Arild Sundgot
19	FW	(Somalia) SOM	Ciise Aadan Abshir
20	MF	(Austria) AUT	Markus Kiesenebner
21	FW	(Tunisia) TUN	Karim Essediri
23	DF	(Norway) NOR	Pål Steffen Andresen
25	MF	(Tunisia) TUN	Khaled Mouelhi
27	FW	(Israel) ISR	Dan Alberto Fellus
30	FW	(Canada) CAN	Olivier Occean

=== Out on loan ===
Note: Flags indicate national team as defined under FIFA eligibility rules; some limited exceptions apply. Players may hold more than one non-FIFA nationality.

No.	Pos.	Nation	Player
8	MF	(Slovakia) SVK	Martin Husár (on loan to Spartak Trnava)
16	MF	(Iceland) ISL	Viktor Bjarki Arnarsson (on loan to KR Reykjavik)
24	FW	(Norway) NOR	Tore Andreas Gundersen (on loan to Lyngby Boldklub)

== Pre-season and friendlies ==
18 January 2008	Lillestrøm	4–0	HamKam	Lillestrøm
16:00	Occean 13'; Pedersen 17', 33'; Mouelhi 55' (pen.)	Report		Stadium: LSK-Hallen; Attendance: 621; Referee: Morten Høgberg

26 January 2008	Lillestrøm	2–2	Haugesund	Lillestrøm
13:00	Pedersen 17'; Myklebust 27'	Report	Nygaard 50'; Gbandi 57'	Stadium: LSK-Hallen; Attendance: 550; Referee: Tom Harald Hagen

1 February 2008	Lillestrøm	1–2	Stabæk	Lillestrøm
16:00	Myklebust 6'	Report	Gunnarsson 49'; Nannskog 57'	Stadium: LSK-Hallen; Attendance: 700; Referee: Morten Høgberg

11 February 2008 La Manga Cup	Lillestrøm (Norway)	1–3	(Russia) Spartak Nalchik	La Manga, Spain
19:00	Arnarsson 85'	Report	Džudović 64'; Amisulashvili 87' (pen.); Felipe 90'	Attendance: 100; Referee: Brage Sandmoen

14 February 2008 La Manga Cup	Lillestrøm (Norway)	1–1 (4–5 p)	(Denmark) Nordsjælland	La Manga, Spain
16:00	Occean 72'		Lundberg 23'	Attendance: 120; Referee: Terje Hauge

18 February 2008 La Manga Cup	Lillestrøm (Norway)	2–2 (4–2 p)	(Sweden) Halmstad	La Manga, Spain
16:00	Kippe 31'; Occean 50'	Report	Arvidsson 26'; Kujović 80'	Attendance: 130; Referee: Kjetil Sælen

22 February 2008	Lillestrøm (Norway)	2–2	(Denmark) Aalborg	La Manga, Spain
13:00	Occean 8.'; Brenne 26'	Report	Nilsson 47'; Enevoldsen 59'	Attendance: 50; Referee: Kjell Alseth

29 February 2008	Lillestrøm	2–2	Strømsgodset	Lillestrøm
16:00	Occean 22.'; Pedersen 43'	Report	Andersson 12.'; Ohr 63'	Stadium: LSK-Hallen; Attendance: 447; Referee: Trygve Kjensli

8 March 2008	Viking	1–0	Lillestrøm	Kleppe
13:00	Ijeh 62'	Report		Stadium: Øksnevad Stadion; Attendance: 400; Referee: Tommy Skjerven

14 March 2008	Molde	0–1	Lillestrøm	Molde
17:45		Report	Riise 37'	Stadium: Aker Stadion; Attendance: 1,000; Referee: Per Ivar Staberg

19 March 2008	Algeciras (Spain)	1–3	(Norway) Lillestrøm	Algeciras, Spain
17:00	Angel 56'		Gundersen 41', 73'; Riise 86'	Stadium: Estadio Nuevo Mirador; Attendance: 100; Referee: Nicolas Fernandez Arjona (Spain)

23 March 2008	Lyn	1–1	Lillestrøm	Marbella, Spain
12:00	Bjarnason 49'	Report	Occean 52'	Stadium: Marpafut; Attendance: 50

21 June 2008	Kongsvinger	0–4	Lillestrøm	Kongsvinger
16:00		Report	Fellus 25'; Søgård 45'; Occean 58', 86'	Stadium: Gjemselund Stadion; Attendance: 400; Referee: Dag Roger Nebben

24 September 2008	Skjetten	2–3	Lillestrøm	Skjetten
	Grubisic 17' (pen.); Hejazi 50'		Fellus 13'; Lie 23'; Occean 27'	Stadium: Skjetten Stadion; Attendance: 700; Referee: Geir Åge Holen

== Competitions ==
=== Tippeligaen ===
==== Results summary ====
Overall								Home						Away					
Pld	W	D	L	GF	GA	GD	Pts	W	D	L	GF	GA	GD	W	D	L	GF	GA	GD
26	7	7	12	30	40	−10	28	5	5	3	21	14	+7	2	2	9	9	26	−17

==== Results by round ====
Round	1	2	3	4	5	6	7	8	9	10	11	12	13	14	15	16	17	18	19	20	21	22	23	24	25	26
Ground	H	A	H	H	A	H	A	H	A	H	A	H	A	H	A	H	A	A	H	A	H	A	H	A	H	A
Result	D	L	L	D	L	W	L	D	L	W	L	L	L	W	W	W	L	D	D	D	D	W	L	L	W	L
Position	7	14	14	14	14	12	13	13	13	13	13	13	13	13	12	12	12	13	12	12	11	10	11	12	10	12

Updated to match(es) played on 2 November 2008. Source: see below
A = Away; H = Home; W = Win; D = Draw; L = Loss

==== Results ====
30 March 2008 1	Lillestrøm	1–1	Tromsø	Lillestrøm
18:00	Ramović 12' (o.g.)	Report	Sequeira 78'	Stadium: Åråsen Stadion; Attendance: 10,024; Referee: Kristoffer Helgerud

6 April 2008 2	Stabæk	4–2	Lillestrøm	Bærum
20:00	Andersson 21', 44'; Keller 56'; Alanzinho 81'	Report	Mouelhi 32' (pen.); Riseth 89'	Stadium: Nadderud Stadion; Attendance: 5,131; Referee: Tommy Skjerven

13 April 2008 3	Lillestrøm	0–3	Vålerenga	Lillestrøm
20:00		Report	Abdellaoue 54' (64); M. Andresen 68' (pen.)	Stadium: Åråsen Stadion; Attendance: 11,760; Referee: Terje Hauge

20 April 2008 4	Lillestrøm	1–1	Molde	Lillestrøm
18:00	Occean 25'	Report	Mota 52'	Stadium: Åråsen Stadion; Attendance: 8,526; Referee: Kjell Alseth

27 April 2008 5	Brann	2–1	Lillestrøm	Bergen
20:00	Einarsson 22'; Demba-Nyrén 44'	Report	Sundgot 40'	Stadium: Brann Stadion; Attendance: 17,228; Referee: Tom Henning Øvrebø

5 May 2008 6	Lillestrøm	2–0	Viking	Lillestrøm
19:00	Sundgot 6'; Occean 13'	Report		Stadium: Åråsen Stadion; Attendance: 8,217; Referee: Espen Berntsen

16 May 2008 7	Rosenborg	4–0	Lillestrøm	Trondheim
18:00	Sapara 23'; Skjelbred 52'; Iversen 55'; Kone 66'	Report		Stadium: Lerkendal Stadion; Attendance: 21,921; Referee: Terje Hauge

25 May 2008 8	Lillestrøm	0–0	HamKam	Lillestrøm
18:00		Report		Stadium: Åråsen Stadion; Attendance: 8,758; Referee: Roy Helge Olsen

2 June 2008 9	Bodø/Glimt	1–0	Lillestrøm	Bodø
19:00	Olsen 65'	Report		Stadium: Aspmyra Stadion; Attendance: 4,863; Referee: Svein Erik Edvartsen

8 June 2008 10	Lillestrøm	3–0	Aalesund	Lillestrøm
16:00	Occean 75', 80'; Sundgot 83'	Report		Stadium: Åråsen Stadion; Attendance: 7,590; Referee: Tom Harald Hagen

28 June 2008 11	Strømsgodset	2–1	Lillestrøm	Drammen
18:00	Winsnes 35'; Nystrøm 62'	Report	Sundgot 17'	Stadium: Marienlyst Stadion; Attendance: 5,428; Referee: Terje Hauge

6 July 2008 12	Lillestrøm	1–2	Lyn	Lillestrøm
18:00	Occean 4'	Report	Hoff 5', 8'	Stadium: Åråsen Stadion; Attendance: 7,334; Referee: Svein Erik Edvartsen

13 July 2008 13	Fredrikstad	4–0	Lillestrøm	Fredrikstad
18:00	Johannsson 2', 44'; Elyounoussi 9'; Barsom 31'	Report		Stadium: Fredrikstad Stadion; Attendance: 12,248; Referee: Terje Hauge

20 July 2008 14	Lillestrøm	3–0	Bodø/Glimt	Lillestrøm
18:00	Sundgot 11', 20'; Occean 19'	Report		Stadium: Åråsen Stadion; Attendance: 7,014; Referee: Kjetil Sælen

27 July 2008 15	HamKam	1–2	Lillestrøm	Hamar
18:00	Pasoja 90+4'	Report	Occean 20', 40'	Stadium: Briskeby Gressbane; Attendance: 5,444; Referee: Tom Henning Øvrebø

3 August 2008 16	Lillestrøm	3–1	Strømsgodset	Lillestrøm
18:00	Bjørkøy 12'; Occean 22'; Stensaas 57'	Report	P. S. Andresen 16' (o.g.)	Stadium: Åråsen Stadion; Attendance: 7,884; Referee: Brage Sandmoen

10 August 2008 17	Lyn	1–0	Lillestrøm	Oslo
18:00	Hoff 42'	Report		Stadium: Ullevaal Stadion; Attendance: 5,254; Referee: Kjell Alseth

24 August 2008 18	Viking	0–0	Lillestrøm	Stavanger
18:00		Report		Stadium: Viking Stadion; Attendance: 15,014; Referee: Per Ivar Staberg

1 September 2008 19	Lillestrøm	1–1	Stabæk	Lillestrøm
19:00	Brenne 57'	Report	Alanzinho 11'	Stadium: Åråsen Stadion; Attendance: 8,635; Referee: Roy Helge Olsen

14 September 2008 20	Molde	1–1	Lillestrøm	Molde
18:00	Skjølsvik 64'	Report	Andreasson 32' (o.g.)	Stadium: Aker Stadion; Attendance: 7,151; Referee: Jonny Ditlefsen

22 September 2008 21	Lillestrøm	1–1	Brann	Lillestrøm
19:00	Pedersen 73'	Report	Einarsson 37'	Stadium: Åråsen Stadion; Attendance: 8,750; Referee: Brage Sandmoen

27 September 2008 22	Tromsø	0–1	Lillestrøm	Tromsø
19:00		Report	Kippe 55'	Stadium: Alfheim Stadion; Attendance: 4,734; Referee: Kjetil Sælen

5 October 2008 23	Lillestrøm	1–2	Fredrikstad	Lillestrøm
18:00	Sundgot 67'	Report	Everton 17'; Johannsson 49'	Stadium: Åråsen Stadion; Attendance: 8,586; Referee: Tom Harald Hagen

20 October 2008 24	Vålerenga	3–1	Lillestrøm	Oslo
19:00	Pedersen 53' (o.g.); Abdellaoue 63'; Sæternes 77'	Report	Riseth 66'	Stadium: Ullevaal Stadion; Attendance: 12,398; Referee: Per Ivar Staberg

26 October 2008 25	Lillestrøm	4–2	Rosenborg	Lillestrøm
18:00	Occean 18', 89'; Myklebust 71'; Sundgot 76'	Report	Strand 12'; Iversen 35'	Stadium: Åråsen Stadion; Attendance: 11,464; Referee: Terje Hauge

2 November 2008 26	Aalesund	3–0	Lillestrøm	Ålesund
18:00	Aarøy 16'; Kopteff 78'; Fredriksen 81'	Report		Stadium: Color Line Stadion; Attendance: 10,639; Referee: Brage Sandmoen

==== Table ====
Pos	Team	Pld	W	D	L	GF	GA	GD	Pts	Qualification or relegation
10	Vålerenga	26	8	6	12	31	37	−6	30	Qualification for the Europa League third qualifying round (Note: Vålerenga qualified for the Europa League third qualifying round as 2008 Norwegian Cup winners.)
11	Strømsgodset	26	8	5	13	33	44	−11	29	
12	Lillestrøm	26	7	7	12	30	40	−10	28	
13	Aalesund (O)	26	7	4	15	29	42	−13	25	Qualification for the relegation play-offs
14	HamKam (R)	26	5	6	15	22	50	−28	21	Relegation to First Division

Source: fotball.no
Rules for classification: 1) points; 2) goal difference; 3) number of goals scored.
(O) Play-off winners; (R) Relegated

=== Norwegian Cup ===
12 May 2008 First Round	Sandar	1–3	Lillestrøm	Sandefjord
18:00	Ellefsen 40'	Report	Pedersen 10'; Occean 39', 67'	Stadium: Vesterøya Idrettspark; Attendance: 1,200; Referee: Ken Henry Johnsen

5 June 2008 Second Round	Eidsvold Turn	1–0	Lillestrøm	Eidsvold
18:00	Fredrikson 34' (o.g.)	Report		Stadium: Myhrer Stadion; Attendance: 1,300; Referee: Bjørn Hansen

=== UEFA Cup ===
==== Qualifying phase ====
14 August 2008 2nd qualifying round 1st leg	Copenhagen (Denmark)	3–1	(Norway) Lillestrøm	Copenhagen, Denmark
20:00	Santin 1'; Júnior 79'; Nordstrand 85'	Report	Kippe 90'	Stadium: Parken Stadium; Attendance: 13,099; Referee: Johan Verbist (Belgium)

28 August 2008 2nd qualifying round 2nd leg	Lillestrøm (Norway)	2–4 (3–7 agg.)	(Denmark) Copenhagen	Lillestrøm, Norway
19:00	Occean 29'; Brenne 75'	Report	Santin 10'; Aílton 29'; Hutchinson 79'; Júnior 86'	Stadium: Åråsen Stadion; Attendance: 2,502; Referee: Bernardino González Vázquez (Spain)

== Transfers ==
=== In ===
Date	Pos.	Name	From	Fee
2008-01-01	DF	(Norway) Steinar Pedersen	IK Start	Free Transfer
2008-01-01	MF	(Norway) Jon Midttun Lie	IK Start	Free Transfer
2008-01-01	DF	(Norway) Vidar Riseth	Rosenborg BK	Free Transfer
2008-01-01	FW	(Somalia) Ciise Aadan Abshir	-	Undisclosed
2008-03-07	MF	(Norway) John Anders Bjørkøy	Fredrikstad FK	4 mill NOK
2008-07-01	FW	(Norway) (Israel) Dan Alberto Fellus	Youth	-

=== Out ===
Date	Pos.	Name	To	Fee
2008-01-01	DF	(Australia) Shane Stefanutto	FC Lyn Oslo	Free Transfer
2008-01-01	FW	(Norway) Anders Rambekk	Odd Grenland	Free Transfer
2008-02-21	FW	(Denmark) Dan Anton Johansen	Released	Free Transfer
2008-03-06	FW	(Norway) Pål Strand	Ham-Kam	Free Transfer

=== Loan in ===
Date	Pos.	Name	From
2008-07-28	DF/MF	(Norway) Ståle Stensaas	FC Lyn Oslo

=== Loan out ===
Date	Pos.	Name	To
2008-07-10	DF/MF	(Slovakia) Martin Husár	Spartak Trnava
2008-03-10	MF	(Iceland) Viktor Bjarki Arnarsson	KR Reykjavík
