= List of Lillestrøm SK seasons =

Norwegian football clubs season-overview

Lillestrøm SK is a Norwegian football club based in Lillestrøm, Norway. The club is among the country's most successful sides, having won the league five times, and the cup seven times. Founded the 2nd of April 1917, LSK already joined the regional league and the Norwegian Cup Championship the same year, and found a lot of success in the regional system of the time.

In 1937–38, the club would join the inaugural eleven-conference top-tier League of Norway, but would face relegation already in its 2nd season. Before the establishment of the League of Norway, winning the cup was considered to be the ultimate glory a Norwegian club could win, and is to this day considered the biggest game in Norway. After World War II and later due to the restructuring of the league-system, Lillestrøm was forced to play in the Third and Second Division. LSK's first major achievements on the national stage would come in the 1950s, after the club secured promotion to the newly established "Main League" in 1952. Throughout the decade, the club established themselves in the top-tier, and reached the cup finale thrice, losing at all three attempts. In 1958-59, the club managed to win their league-group for the first time ever, and would face Fredrikstad FK in the championship final. Fredrikstad had won the league seven times already, were considered the "aristocrats" of Norwegian football, and had gone unbeaten through their group. The clubs fought out a 2–2 tie in the first final, before a rematch was scheduled to months later. This time Lillestrøm won 4–1, and took their first ever major trophy. The two finalists would face each other again already in the final of the following season, this time ending with a 6–2 win for Fredrikstad.

Already in the following season, Lillestrøm would be relegated to the second tier. Despite following up by finishing second in the two following seasons, the clubs would see further misfortune when finishing last in the 1966 season. 1967 would be the weakest season in the clubs history, battling against relegation to the Fourth division. In the third last game of the season, a pivotal 2–1 win at home against Mesna SK helped to secure the spot.

Despite the difficult starting-points, Lillestrøms golden era would come during the 1970s and 80s, with the club climbing from the Third division in 1973, to winning the top-tier First division only three years later in 1976. This was largely due to a new generation of players coming through the academy, spearheaded by the talented striker Tom Lund. During this era, the club would be the first in Norway to bring up the matter of professionalising their players. The 1977 season would be the biggest in the clubs history, when winning the double while facing Dutch giants Ajax in Lillestrøms first ever European Cup-game. This fixture held extra symbolism, as Tom Lund had declined an offer from Ajax in 1973, while still playing in the Norwegian Third division. Despite a promising 2–0 win at Ullevaal Stadion, Ajax would come out victorious with a 4–0 win in Amsterdam.

The club would further go on to win the Norwegian Cup in 1978, 1981, and 1985, and the league in 1986 and 1989. Following this last league-title, the club would go on to almost getting relegated in the following 1990 season, only surviving by beating Bryne and Eik-Tønsberg in the relegation playoff. During the rest of the 1990s, the club would be an established force in the upper half of the league, and was occasionally close to challenging Rosenborg for the titles. 2001 would be the closest the club got to regaining their league title, when at the final day of the season, Lillestrøm remained only one point behind. For taking the title, Lillestrøm would have to beat Tromsø at home, while Brann had to keep Rosenborg to a tie. While Lillestrøm made a promising start, being 2–0 ahead at half-time, what followed was a parachutist flying through the roof over the singing supporters. In need of assistance, the game was 30 minutes delayed, while Rosenborg went on to win 6-2. The 2001 season remains the last time LSK won a medal in the league.

In the following seasons, Lillestrøm would go on to finish seventh three years in a row. In the mid-2000s however, Rosenborgs grip of power finally fell, and a new wave of enthusiasm arrived in Norwegian football. In the 2005, 2006, and 2007 seasons, Lillestrøm would finish 4th at all occasions. The club also made it to the cup final in two of these seasons, losing 4–2 aet in 2005 to Molde, and winning 2–0 in 2007 against Haugesund. The following seasons would turn out disappointing for LSK. Big economic issues lead to weaker results on the pitch, and the club remained almost exclusively in the lower half of the table until eventually getting relegated after a playoff game against Start in 2019. Despite the worsened situation, the club did manage to win the cup in 2017, beating Sarpsborg 08 3–2 in the finale. In a seasons plagued by COVID-19, the club was able to get promoted back up the 1st tier at their first attempt in 2020. Since then, the club has made it to another cup final, and has been playing in Europe again.

For a long time, Lillestrøm held the record for the longest consecutive stay in the top-tier, with their 45 season-stay from 1975 to 2019.

== Key ==
Key to league and cup records:

- Pld = Matches played
- W = Matches won
- D = Matches drawn
- L = Matches lost
- GF = Goals for
- GA = Goals against
- Pts = Points
- Pos = Final position
- NH = Not held
- GS = Group stage
- PR = Preliminary Round
- Q1 = Qualification round 1
- Q2 = Qualification round 2
- Q3 = Qualification round 3
- R1 = Round 1
- R2 = Round 2
- GS = Group stage
- R3 = Round 3
- QF = Quarter-finals
- SF = Semi-finals
- RU = Runners-up
- W = Winners

Champions	Runners-up	Promoted	Relegated	First Tier	Second Tier	Third Tier

== Kretsserie era (until 1937) ==
Season	League										Cup	Other	
Season	Division	Tier	Pld	W	D	L	GF	GA	Pts	Pos	Cup	Other	
1917	Romerike Fotballkrets	A (Note: Prior to the 1937–38 League of Norway, there was no national football pyramid. With the exception of the Norwegian Football Cup, all official games were on a district-level. The district-leagues were divided in A-, B- and C-classes.)	6	5	1	0	11	6	11	1st	R1	–	
1918	Romerike Fotballkrets	A	6	5	0	1	24	2	10	1st	—	–	
1919	Romerike Fotballkrets	A	6	2	0	4	8	12	4	3rd	R1	–	
1920	Romerike Fotballkrets	A	6	2	1	3	7	11	5	3rd	R1	–	
1921	Romerike Fotballkrets	A	6	4	1	1	13	10	9	2nd	R1	–	
1922	Lillestrøm og Omegn Fotballkrets (Note: In 1922, Romerike Fotballkrets was divided into Lillestrøm og Omegn Fotballkrets, Eidsvold og Omegns Fotballkrets and Øvre Romerike Fotballkrets.)	A	6	4	0	2	18	9	8	2nd	R1	–	
1923	Lillestrøm og Omegn Fotballkrets	A	5	5	0	0	27	7	10	1st	R3	–	
1924	Lillestrøm og Omegn Fotballkrets	A	6	4	1	1	16	3	9	1st	R1	–	
1925	Lillestrøm og Omegn Fotballkrets	A	3	2	1	0	14	1	5	1st	R2	–	
1926	Lillestrøm og Omegn Fotballkrets	A	3	3	0	0	17	3	6	1st	R1	–	
1927	Lillestrøm og Omegn Fotballkrets	A	3	2	1	0	14	1	5	1st	R1	–	
1928	Lillestrøm og Omegn Fotballkrets	A	6	5	1	0	21	8	11	1st	R2	–	
1929	Romerike Fotballkrets (Note: In 1929, Lillestrøm og Omegn Fotballkrets and Eidsvold og Omegns Fotballkrets reunified back into Romerike Fotballkrets.)	A	12	9	1	2	53	18	11	1st	R2	–	
1930	Romerike Fotballkrets	A	7	7	0	0	33	6	14	1st	R4	–	
1931	Vestre Romerike Fotballkrets (Note: In 1931, Romerike Fotballkrets was renamed into Vestre Romerike Fotballkrets.)	A	7	6	1	0	38	10	13	1st	R3	–	
1932	Vestre Romerike Fotballkrets	A	6	5	1	0	28	8	11	1st	R2	–	
1933	Vestre Romerike Fotballkrets	A	7	7	0	0	40	10	14	1st	R3	–	
1934	Vestre Romerike Fotballkrets	A	7	5	0	2	26	11	10	2nd	R2	–	
1935	Vestre Romerike Fotballkrets	A	6	6	0	0	28	8	12	1st	R2	–	
1936	Vestre Romerike Fotballkrets	A	7	7	0	0	32	5	14	1st	R3	–	
1937	Pokalserien Gr. 1 (Note: In 1937, the local championship was shortened down to accomidate for the upcoming Norgesserien. The winner of the shortened down 3-game Group 1 (south), entered a trophy-finale against the winner from Group 2 (north).)	A	3	3	0	0	21	4	6	1st	R3	Play-Off	W

== Norgesserien era (1938–1948) ==
Season	League										Cup	Other	Top goalscorer(s)	
Season	Division	Tier	Pld	W	D	L	GF	GA	Pts	Pos	Cup	Other	Player(s)	Goals
1937-38	Norgesserien District II, Gr. A	1	12	3	1	8	20	32	7	6th	QF	–	Unknown	
1938-39	Norgesserien District II, Gr. A	1	14	3	3	8	25	35	7	8th	R4	–	Unknown	
1939-40	1. divisjon (Note: The 1939–40 League was canceled mid-season due to the invasion of Norway.)	2	10	8	1	1	43	8	17	1st	R4 (Note: Despite the invasion of Norway, the cup was still played. Later, the Quisling government would attempt to nazify Norwegian sports. As a result, the Norwegians sports organisations went on strike throughout the war.)	–	Unknown	
1945	Vestre Romerike Fotballkrets	A	11	10	0	1	54	5	20	1st	R4	–	(Norway) Alf Martinsen	17
1946-47	Vestre Romerike Fotballkrets. 2. divisjon qualifyer.	A	20	17	1	2	89	18	35	2nd	R2	–	(Norway) Rolf Andresen (Norway) Knut Bryhn	15
1947-48	2. divisjon	3	12	7	3	2	24	10	17	3rd	R2	–	(Norway) Rolf Andresen	8

== Hovedserien era (1948–1962) ==
Season	League										Cup	Other		Top goalscorer(s)	
Season	Division	Tier	Pld	W	D	L	GF	GA	Pts	Pos	Cup	Other		Player(s)	Goals
1948-49	2. divisjon	3	14	12	0	2	51	17	24	1st	R2	Promotion Play-Off	W	(Norway) Sverre Borgersen	17
1949-50	2. divisjon	2	14	8	3	3	30	14	19	3rd	R1	–		(Norway) Ivar Wahl	18
1950-51	1. divisjon Østland-Nordre	2	14	11	1	2	32	13	23	2nd	R4	–		(Norway) Gunnar Lund	14
1951-52	Landsdelsserien	2	14	9	4	1	31	15	22	1st	R2	–		(Norway) Gunnar Lund	8
1952-53	Hovedserien Gr. B	1	14	6	4	4	25	22	16	3rd	QF	–		(Norway) Sverre Borgersen	11
1953-54	Hovedserien Gr. B	1	14	8	3	3	45	22	19	3rd	RU	–		(Norway) Gunnar Arnesen (Norway) Ivar Wahl	14
1954-55	Hovedserien Gr. B	1	14	6	2	6	27	30	14	6th	QF	–		(Norway) Ivar Hansen (Norway) Gunnar Arnesen	12
1955-56	Hovedserien Gr. B	1	14	6	1	7	19	25	13	4th	RU	–		(Norway) Gunnar Arnesen (Norway) Per Sæther	8
1956-57	Hovedserien Gr. B	1	14	7	2	5	21	22	16	3rd	R2	–		(Norway) Per sæther	9
1957-58	Hovedserien Gr. B	1	14	6	1	7	34	32	13	5th	R2	–		(Norway) Oddvar Richardsen	13
1958-59	Hovedserien Gr. B	1	14	9	1	4	36	25	19	1st	RU	Championship Play-Off	W	(Norway) Oddvar Richardsen	14
1959-60	Hovedserien Gr. A	1	14	8	3	3	28	21	19	1st	R4	Championship Play-Off	RU	(Norway) Oddvar Richardsen	20
1960-61	Hovedserien Gr. B	1	14	4	3	7	29	31	11	7th	R3	–		(Norway) Trond Willadsen	8
1961-62	Landsdelsserien Østland Nordre	2	21	11	5	5	60	47	27	2nd	R4 (1961) R2 (1962)	–		(Norway) Oddvar Richardsen	28

== 1. divisjon era (1963–1989) ==
Season	League										Cup	Europe		Other	Top goalscorer(s)	
Season	Division	Tier	Pld	W	D	L	GF	GA	Pts	Pos	Cup	Europe		Other	Player(s)	Goals
1963	2. divisjon Gr. B	2	14	8	4	2	41	26	20	2nd	R2	–		–	(Norway) Oddvar Richardsen	14
1964	2. divisjon Gr. B	2	14	6	2	6	25	25	14	5th	R2	–		–	(Norway) Per Ytre-Eide	10
1965	2. divisjon Gr. A	2	14	6	1	7	29	29	13	5th	R1	–		–	(Norway) Jan-Thore Berntzen	9
1966	2. divisjon Gr. A	2	14	1	3	10	25	56	5	8th	R3	–		–	(Norway) Jan-Thore Berntzen	9
1967	3. divisjon Østland/Nordre	3	14	3	4	7	19	30	10	6th	R2	–		–	(Norway) Bjørn Myhre	5
1968	3. divisjon Østland/Nordre	3	14	8	1	5	29	16	17	3rd	R1	–		–	(Norway) Jan-Thore Berntzen (Norway) Tom Lund	9
1969	3. divisjon Østland/Nordre	3	18	12	3	3	42	18	27	3rd	R2	–		–	(Norway) Tom Lund	16
1970	3. divisjon Østland/Nordre	3	18	7	3	8	23	26	17	6th	R2	–		–	(Norway) Svein Aardahl	9
1971	3. divisjon Østland/Nordre	3	18	7	6	5	25	17	20	4th	R3	–		–	(Norway) Leif Hansen	13
1972	3. divisjon Østland/Nordre	3	18	11	5	2	28	13	27	2nd	R4	–		–	(Norway) Tom Lund	12
1973	3. divisjon Østland/Nordre	3	18	15	2	1	67	11	32	1st	QF	–		–	(Norway) Tom Lund	34
1974	2. divisjon Group B	2	18	15	2	1	44	8	32	1st	R3	–		–	(Norway) Tom Lund	25
1975	1. divisjon	1	22	10	3	9	27	20	23	7th	R4	–		–	(Norway) Tom Lund	8
1976	1. divisjon	1	22	13	5	4	39	19	31	1st	R3	–		–	(Norway) Tom Lund	15
1977	1. divisjon	1	22	16	4	2	42	11	36	1st	W	European Cup	R1	–	(Norway) Tom Lund	13
1978	1. divisjon	1	22	11	9	2	45	22	30	2nd	W	European Cup	R2	–	(Norway) Tom Lund	21
1979	1. divisjon	1	22	7	9	6	25	23	23	5th	QF	Cup Winners' Cup	PR	–	(Norway) Arne Dokken	11
1980	1. divisjon	1	22	10	7	5	36	25	27	3rd	RU	–		–	(Norway) Arne Dokken	20
1981	1. divisjon	1	22	6	10	6	26	25	22	7th	W	–		–	(Norway) Arne Dokken (Norway) André Krogsæter	8
1982	1. divisjon	1	22	11	3	8	35	26	25	3rd	R4	Cup Winners' Cup	R1	–	(Finland) Juhani Himanka	9
1983	1. divisjon	1	22	10	8	4	40	28	28	2nd	R4	–		–	(Norway) André Krogsæter	15
1984	1. divisjon	1	22	8	7	7	39	30	23	5th	QF	UEFA Cup	R1	–	(Norway) André Krogsæter	17
1985	1. divisjon	1	22	12	8	2	39	11	32	2nd	W	–		–	(Norway) André Krogsæter	17
1986	1. divisjon	1	22	16	1	5	40	17	33	1st	RU	Cup Winners' Cup	R1	–	(Norway) Sten Glenn Håberg	15
1987	1. divisjon	1	22	7 (Note: From 1987, a win was rewarded 3 points.)	3+2 (Note: In 1987, with the introduction of 3 points for a win, it was decided that in the event of a draw, there would be a penalty shootout, in which the winner would be receiving 2 points instead of 1.)	10	22	21	29	9th	R4	European Cup	R2	–	(Norway) Sten Glenn Håberg	10
1988	1. divisjon	1	22	11	7	4	38	18	40	2nd	R3	–		–	(Norway) Jan Åge Fjørtoft	16
1989	1. divisjon	1	22	16	4	2	31	13	52	1st	QF	UEFA Cup	R1	–	(Norway) Stein Amundsen	10

== Tippeligaen era (1990–2016) ==
Season	League										Cup	Europe		Other		Top goalscorer(s)	
Season	Division	Tier	Pld	W	D	L	GF	GA	Pts	Pos	Cup	Europe		Other		Player(s)	Goals
1990	Tippeligaen	1	22	11	4	11	30	30	25	10th	QF	European Cup	R1	Relegation Play-Off	W	(Norway) Eivind Arnevåg	12
1991	Tippeligaen	1	22	9	4	9	31	27	31	5th	SF	–		–		(Norway) Tom Gulbrandsen	7
1992	Tippeligaen	1	22	11	5	6	48	28	38	4th	RU	–		–		(Norway) Kenneth Nysæther	14
1993	Tippeligaen	1	22	13	3	6	47	26	42	3rd	QF	Cup Winners' Cup	R1	–		(Norway) Mons Ivar Mjelde	29
1994	Tippeligaen	1	22	12	5	5	42	23	41	2nd	R4	UEFA Cup	R1	–		(Norway) Peter Hederman (Norway) Ståle Solbakken	11
1995	Tippeligaen	1	26	11	8	7	50	36	41	4th	SF	UEFA Cup	R1	–		(Norway) Ståle Solbakken	20
1996	Tippeligaen	1	26	13	7	6	54	33	46	2nd	R3	Intertoto Cup	GS	–		(Norway) Geir Frigård	17
1997	Tippeligaen	1	26	9	5	12	34	43	32	10th	R4	UEFA Cup	R1	–		(Norway) Ståle Solbakken (Norway) Frank Strandlie	9
1998	Tippeligaen	1	26	9	6	11	41	49	33	8th	R3	–		–		(Senegal) Mamadou Diallo	10
1999	Tippeligaen	1	26	15	3	8	60	41	48	4th	QF	–		–		(Iceland) Heidar Helguson	18
2000	Tippeligaen	1	26	11	7	8	42	29	40	6th	QF	UEFA Cup	R2	–		(Norway) Arild Sundgot	12
2001	Tippeligaen	1	26	17	5	4	64	33	56	2nd	QF	–		–		(Australia) Clayton Zane	20
2002	Tippeligaen	1	26	10	6	10	37	30	36	7th	R3	UEFA Champions League	Q2	–		(East Germany) Uwe Rösler	9
2003	Tippeligaen	1	26	10	7	9	33	35	37	7th	R4	–		–		(Norway) Arild Sundgot	9
2004	Tippeligaen	1	26	8	11	7	45	33	35	7th	SF	–		–		(Norway) Arild Sundgot	19
2005	Tippeligaen	1	26	12	6	8	37	31	42	4th	RU	–		–		(Norway) Arild Sundgot	15
2006	Tippeligaen	1	26	12	8	6	44	33	44	4th	QF	Intertoto Cup	R3	Royal League	RU	(Slovenia) Robert Koren	16
2007	Tippeligaen	1	26	12	8	6	47	28	44	4th	W	UEFA Cup	Q1	Royal League	QF	(Canada) Olivier Occean	16
2008	Tippeligaen	1	26	7	7	12	30	40	28	8th	R2	UEFA Cup	Q2	–		(Canada) Olivier Occean	14
2009	Tippeligaen	1	30	9	10	11	43	50	37	11th	R2	–		–		(Norway) Arild Sundgot	11
2010	Tippeligaen	1	30	9	13	8	51	44	40	10th	R3	–		–		(Nigeria) Anthony Ujah	17
2011	Tippeligaen	1	30	9	7	14	46	52	34	13th	R4	–		–		(Nigeria) Anthony Ujah	13
2012	Tippeligaen	1	30	9	12	9	46	47	39	9th	R4	–		–		(Iceland) Björn Bergmann Sigurðarson	12
2013	Tippeligaen	1	30	9	9	12	37	44	36	10th	SF	–		–		(Norway) Petter Vaagan Moen	12
2014	Tippeligaen	1	30	13	7	10	49	35	56	5th	QF	–		–		(Norway) Petter Vaagan Moen	11
2015	Tippeligaen	1	30	12	9	9	44	43	44	8th	R3	–		–		(Nigeria) Fred Friday	17
2016	Tippeligaen	1	30	8	10	12	45	50	34	12th	R3	–		–		(Nigeria) Fred Friday	8

== Eliteserien era (2017–) ==
Season	League										Cup	Europe		Other		Top goalscorer(s)	
Season	Division	Tier	Pld	W	D	L	GF	GA	Pts	Pos	Cup	Europe		Other		Player(s)	Goals
2017	Eliteserien	1	30	10	7	13	40	43	37	12th	W	–		–		(Norway) Erling Knudtzon	9
2018	Eliteserien	1	30	7	11	12	34	44	32	12th	SF	Europa League	Q2	Mesterfinalen	RU	(Norway) Thomas Lehne Olsen	17
2019	Eliteserien	1	30	7	9	14	32	47	30	14th	R3	–		Relegation Play-Off	L	(Norway) Thomas Lehne Olsen	10
2020	1. divisjon	2	30	16	9	5	49	26	57	2nd	NH (Note: Cancelled due to the COVID-19 pandemic.)	–		–		(Norway) Thomas Lehne Olsen	9
2021	Eliteserien	1	30	14	7	9	49	40	49	4th	QF (Note: Finished during the spring of 2022 due to the aftermath of the COVID-19 pandemic.)	–		–		(Norway) Thomas Lehne Olsen	28
2022	Eliteserien	1	30	16	5	9	49	34	53	4th	RU (Note: Finished during the spring of 2023 due to the aftermath of the COVID-19 pandemic.)	UEFA Europa Conference League	Q3	–		(Iceland) Holmbert Fridjonsson	13
2023	Eliteserien	1	30	13	4	13	49	49	43	6th	R2	–		–		(Nigeria) Akor Adams	17
2024	Eliteserien	1	30	7	3	23	33	63	24	15th	QF	–		–		(Norway) Thomas Lehne Olsen	12
2025	1. divisjon	2	30	25	5	0	87	18	80	1st	W	–		–		(Norway) Thomas Lehne Olsen	23
