= Richardsen =

Richardsen is a surname. Notable people with the surname include:

- Philipp Richardsen (born 1976), Austrian musician
- Oddvar Richardsen (1937–1997), Norwegian footballer and manager
- Rune Richardsen (born 1962), Norwegian footballer

== See also ==
- Richardson (surname)
