= Espen Johnsen =

Norwegian footballer (born 1979)

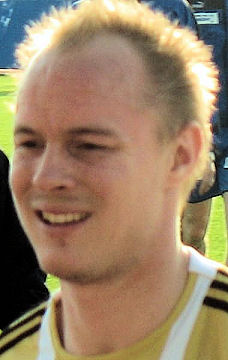

Personal information
- Date of birth: 20 December 1979 (age 46)
- Place of birth: Kristiansand, Norway
- Height: 1.88 m (6 ft 2 in)
- Position: Goalkeeper

Youth career
- Vigør

Senior career*
Years	Team	Apps	(Gls)
2000	Start	43	(0)
2001–2008	Rosenborg	76	(1)
2007–2008	→ Strømsgodset (loan)	46	(0)
2009	Rosenborg	0	(0)

International career
2003–2008	Norway	18	(0)
- * Club domestic league appearances and goals

Espen Johnsen (born 20 December 1979) is a retired Norwegian football goalkeeper. His brother Marius Johnsen was also a footballer.

== Football career ==
His career started at the local club Vigør. After a few years of playing for Start, he was brought to Rosenborg in Trondheim. He was mostly benched his first two years there because of the Icelandic goalkeeper Arni Gautur Arason, who left Rosenborg in 2003 for Manchester City. Espen then established himself as the first-choice in Rosenborg as well as on the Norwegian national team, but lost his place after a six-month injury layoff resulting from an injury sustained while playing against Spain.

After becoming second choice in Rosenborg after the purchase of Lars Hirschfeld, Johnsen made it clear that he was not satisfied with his "demotion", and on 6 October 2006, Strømsgodset announced that he had agreed to join them on a one-year loan deal starting in January 2007. He returned to Rosenborg in 2008. In March 2010 he was linked to Swedish champions AIK and according to Norwegian press, he was edging closer to a deal with them.

Despite offers from Rosenborg and others Johnsen retired as a player in 2010 due to suffering from jumper's knee, and to focus on his studies.

== Education and personal life ==
Espen is studying to be an M.D. at the Norwegian University of Science and Technology in Trondheim, Norway. When living in Kristiansand, he studied at the Agder University College, taking his exam in Christian studies. He is an active member of the Evangelical Lutheran Free Church of Norway.

Johnsen is the doctor assigned to the Start first team in 2019.

== Honours ==
=== Individual ===
- Kniksen award as Goalkeeper of the year: 2003
