= Caroline Berg Eriksen =

Norwegian blogger

Caroline Berg Eriksen (born 28 January 1987) is a Norwegian blogger.

== Personal life and career ==
Berg Eriksen started her career as a model and as a journalist at the website side2.no. She studied journalism at Norges Kreative Fagskole.

In 2012, Eriksen published her first book, Fotballfrues Dagbok - Et år med Norges Største Blogger, about being a footballer's wife.

In 2013, she had her first child, whose name is Nelia.

In 2016 she had another child, who would go on to be named Naia.

She is married to Lars Kristian Eriksen.
