= IL Tjalg =

Norwegian sports club

- Full name: Idrettslaget Tjalg
- Founded: 1946
- Ground: Mobanen
- League: none
Home colours

Idrettslaget Tjalg is a multisports club from Brønnøysund, Norway. It has sections for association football, skiing, gymnastics and athletics.

The club was founded in 1946, and plays at Mobanen. The men's football team currently does not exist, but in the late 2000s it played in the Norwegian Fifth Division, the sixth tier of Norwegian football. It played in the Third Division in 1998, but then as a cooperation team with Sømna IL.
