= Daniel Stensland =

Norwegian footballer (born 1989)

Personal information
- Date of birth: 24 September 1989 (age 37)
- Place of birth: Fauske Municipality, Norway
- Position: Left winger

Team information
- Current team: Levanger
- Number: 27

Senior career*
Years	Team	Apps	(Gls)
2006–2007	Fauske/Sprint		
2008–2012	Bodø/Glimt	44	(3)
2012–	Levanger	48	(6)
- * Club domestic league appearances and goals as of 26 May 2015

Daniel Stensland (born 24 September 1989 in Fauske Municipality, Salten) is a Norwegian footballer who plays for Levanger.

He made his debut against SK Brann in April 2009. Born in Fauske Municipality, Stensland has played for Fauske/Sprint in the Norwegian Third Division in 2006 and 2007, before he transferred to Bodø/Glimt in 2008.

== Career statistics ==
As of 10 July 2015

Season	Club	Division	League		Cup		Total	
Season	Club	Division	Apps	Goals	Apps	Goals	Apps	Goals
2009	Bodø/Glimt	Tippeligaen	18	1	3	0	21	1
2010	Bodø/Glimt	Adeccoligaen	17	2	3	1	20	3
2011	Bodø/Glimt	Adeccoligaen	9	0	2	1	11	1
2012	Bodø/Glimt	Adeccoligaen	0	0	0	0	0	0
2012	Levanger	2. divisjon	7	0	0	0	7	0
2013	Levanger	2. divisjon	16	2	1	0	17	2
2014	Levanger	2. divisjon	15	3	1	1	16	4
2015	Levanger	OBOS-ligaen	10	1	2	0	12	1
Career Total			92	9	12	3	104	12
