= Rune Richardsen =

Norwegian footballer (1962–2023)

Personal information
- Date of birth: 21 September 1962
- Place of birth: Jessheim, Norway
- Date of death: 27 July 2023 (aged 60)
- Position: Midfielder

Youth career
- Ull/Kisa

Senior career*
Years	Team	Apps	(Gls)
1980–1987	Lillestrøm		

International career
1986–1987	Norway	4	(0)
- * Club domestic league appearances and goals

Rune Richardsen (21 September 1962 – 27 July 2023) was a Norwegian footballer who played as a midfielder for Lillestrøm.

Starting his career in Ull/Kisa, from 1980 to 1987 he played for Lillestrøm, becoming cup champion in 1985 and league champion in 1986.

His father Oddvar Richardsen was also capped for Norway. They were the eighth father-son combination to be capped.

Richardsen died on 27 July 2023, at the age of 60.
