= Gunnar Arnesen =

Norwegian footballer (1927-2009)

Personal information
- Date of birth: 30 October 1927
- Place of birth: Lillestrøm, Norway
- Date of death: 30 May 2009 (aged 81)
- Position: Forward

International career
Years	Team	Apps	(Gls)
1954–1959	Norway	2	(0)

Gunnar Arnesen (30 October 1927 – 30 May 2009) was a Norwegian footballer. He played in two matches for the Norway national football team from 1954 to 1959.
