= Gøran van den Burgt =

Norwegian footballer (born 1990)

Personal information
- Date of birth: 1 January 1990 (age 36)
- Height: 1.85 m (6 ft 1 in)
- Position: Midfielder

Team information
- Current team: Ready

Youth career
- –2004: Bjerkealliansen
- –2008: Lyn

Senior career*
Years	Team	Apps	(Gls)
2008	Bærum		
2009–2010	Lyn	19	(5)
2010–2012	Strømmen	59	(6)
2013–2014	Lyn		
2015–	Ready		
- * Club domestic league appearances and goals as of 29 September 2013

Gøran van den Burgt (born 1 January 1990) is a Norwegian football midfielder who currently plays for Ready.

His father is Dutch. He started his career in Bjerkealliansen, but joined FC Lyn Oslo at the age of fifteen. He was the team captain of their U-20 team, In the summer of 2008 he gave up Lyn, and signed for Bærum SK, but ahead of the 2009 season he was signed by Lyn's senior team. He has one Norwegian Premier League game in 2009, making his debut on 22 March 2009 against Start. After the team went defunct in 2010, he left and joined Strømmen IF. He rejoined Lyn, now a 2. Divisjon team, in 2013.

In 2015, he went on to Ready.
