= Björn Bergmann Sigurðarson =

Icelandic footballer

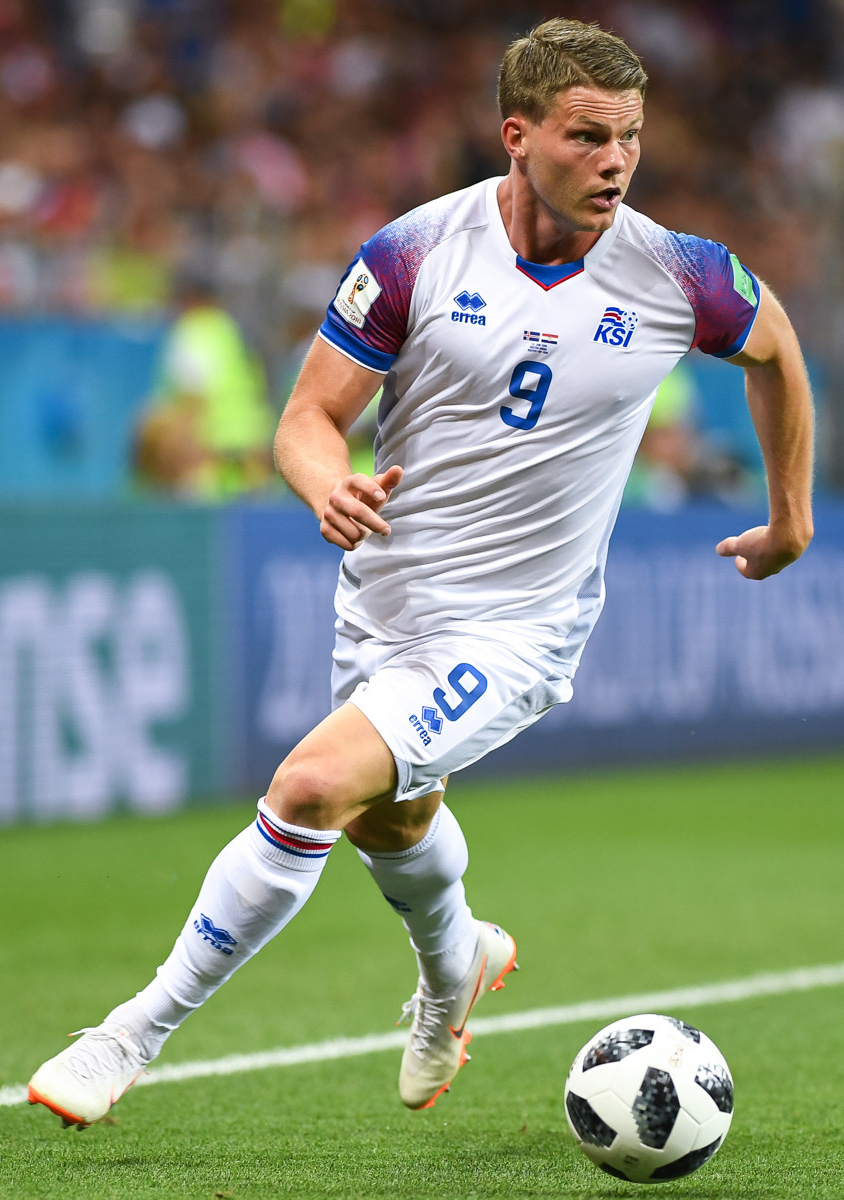
- Björn with Iceland at the 2018 FIFA World Cup

Personal information
- Full name: Björn Bergmann Sigurðarson
- Date of birth: 26 February 1991 (age 35)
- Place of birth: Akranes, Iceland
- Height: 1.87 m (6 ft 2 in)
- Position: Forward

Youth career
- ÍA

Senior career*
Years	Team	Apps	(Gls)
2007–2008	ÍA	30	(6)
2009–2012	Lillestrøm	70	(17)
2012–2016	Wolverhampton Wanderers	69	(7)
2014	→ Molde (loan)	15	(3)
2015	→ Copenhagen (loan)	14	(1)
2016–2017	Molde	38	(20)
2018–2020	Rostov	38	(8)
2020	→ APOEL (loan)	0	(0)
2020–2021	Lillestrøm	7	(1)
2021–2022	Molde	1	(0)
2023	ÍA	0	(0)

International career^{‡}
2006–2007	Iceland U-17	5	(0)
2007–2008	Iceland U-19	7	(2)
2010–2012	Iceland U-21	7	(4)
2011–2018	Iceland	17	(1)
- * Club domestic league appearances and goals as of 20 May 2023 ‡ National team caps and goals as of 9 September 2018

Björn Bergmann Sigurðarson (born 26 February 1991) is an Icelandic former footballer who played as a forward.

He began his career with ÍA in his native Iceland before a three-year spell at Norwegian side Lillestrøm, during which time he made his international debut. In July 2012, he moved to English side Wolverhampton Wanderers for a reported £2.4m fee. His contract with Wolves expired in June 2016 without renewal.

== Club career ==
=== ÍA ===
Björn made his debut for his hometown club ÍA in the 2007 Úrvalsdeild. He was mostly employed as a substitute in his first season, but became a regular first team player during the next season. However, ÍA suffered relegation to the second level.

He did not remain at ÍA after their relegation, though, and instead signed a three-year contract with Norwegian club Lillestrøm in January 2009.

=== Lillestrøm ===
After making his club debut on 22 March 2009 against Viking, Björn's first season in the Tippeliga was troubled by numerous lower back injuries. He did manage to make 12 appearances, scoring once (against Bodø/Glimt on 20 September).

In the 2010 season, he became regular player for the club, a position he has held ever since. In Autumn 2011, his contract was extended further to run until 2014, though this news was not made public.

In the 2012 season, Björn scored seven times in the first eleven league games, as well as four goals in two cup ties.

=== Wolverhampton Wanderers ===
On 18 June 2012, Björn's club officially announced that they had accepted an undisclosed bid for him from English side Wolverhampton Wanderers, believed to be in the region of £2.4 million. After passing to a medical and agreeing to personal terms for a four-year contract, the deal was finalised on 17 July 2012.

The Icelandic striker made his Wolves debut as a substitute in an opening day defeat at Leeds United. He scored his first goal for the club in a 2–0 win at Peterborough in late September, the first of five goals during a campaign that ended in relegation to League One.

In the 2013–14 season, under his third different manager during his time at Wolves, Björn failed to hold down a regular place in Wolves' team and, on 31 January 2014, he was loaned to Norwegian side Molde for the remainder of 2014 in order to complete the Norwegian league season. During this loan spell he won the league and cup double with Molde.

On 1 January 2016, he came on as a 67th-minute substitute for James Henry in a 1–0 Championship win at Brighton & Hove Albion, his first Wolves appearance for over two years. Björn went on to often be used during the second half of the season, frequently as a lone forward, but failed to score during these 15 appearances, meaning his final goal for Wolves had come almost three years prior in August 2013.

At the conclusion of the season, Wolves announced they would not be renewing his contract. He had made 75 appearances in total for the club, scoring seven times.

=== Molde ===
On 12 July 2016, Björn joined Norwegian club Molde on a free transfer. This came after his short loan spell with the club in 2014. He made his debut for Molde on 28 March 2014 in a 2–0 home win against Vålerenga. In this match, he also scored his first goal for Molde. It came in the 29th minute, and was the first of the game. He was subbed off in the 82nd minute of that match, being replaced by Tommy Høiland.

=== Rostov ===
On 5 January 2018, Björn signed a three-and-a-half-year contract with the Russian club Rostov.

On 22 January 2020, he was loaned to Cypriot club APOEL.

=== Return to Lillestrøm ===
On 14 August 2020, he returned to Lillestrøm and signed a contract until the end of 2020.

=== Return to Molde ===
On 1 February 2021, Molde announced the return of Sigurðarson on a two-year contract.

== International career ==
Björn has represented Iceland at numerous youth levels, most recently playing for their Under-21 team in the qualifying competition for the 2013 European Under-21 Championship. He played two matches in the 2011 European Under-21 Championship Finals in Denmark.

He has seven caps for the full Icelandic national team, having made his debut as a substitute in a 1–0 win over Cyprus during Euro 2012 qualification on 6 September 2011. He scored his first goal for the Iceland senior team in a 2–1 World Cup Qualifying win against Kosovo. The goal came in the 25th minute.

He played at China Cup 2017, where Iceland won silver medals

In May 2018, he was named in Iceland's 23-man squad for the 2018 World Cup in Russia.

== Personal life ==
Björn has three half-brothers, Bjarni Guðjónsson, Þórður Guðjónsson and Joey Guðjónsson, who have all been professional footballers as well as playing for the Icelandic national team. Joey also played for Wolves.

== Career statistics ==
=== Club ===
As of match played 31 June 2022

Appearances and goals by club, season and competition
Club	Season	League			National Cup		League Cup		Continental		Other		Total	
Club	Season	Division	Apps	Goals	Apps	Goals	Apps	Goals	Apps	Goals	Apps	Goals	Apps	Goals
ÍA	2007	Úrvalsdeild	11	2	1	1	7	2	–		–		19	5
ÍA	2008	Úrvalsdeild	19	4	1	0	3	1	2	1	–		25	6
ÍA	Total		30	6	2	1	10	3	2	1	–	–	44	11
Lillestrøm	2009	Tippeligaen	12	1	0	0	–		–		–		12	1
Lillestrøm	2010	Tippeligaen	25	4	1	0	–		–		–		26	4
Lillestrøm	2011	Tippeligaen	20	5	3	3	–		–		–		23	8
Lillestrøm	2012	Tippeligaen	13	7	4	5	–		–		–		17	12
Lillestrøm	Total		70	17	8	8	–	–	–	–	–	–	78	25
Wolverhampton Wanderers	2012–13	Championship	37	5	0	0	2	0	–		–		39	5
Wolverhampton Wanderers	2013–14	League One	18	2	1	0	0	0	–		2	0	21	2
Wolverhampton Wanderers	2014–15	Championship	0	0	0	0	0	0	–		–		0	0
Wolverhampton Wanderers	2015–16	Championship	14	0	1	0	0	0	–		–		15	0
Wolverhampton Wanderers	Total		69	7	2	0	2	0	–	–	2	0	75	7
Molde (loan)	2014	Tippeligaen	15	3	2	0	–		0	0	–		17	3
Copenhagen (loan)	2014–15	Danish Superliga	14	1	3	1	–		0	0	–		17	2
Molde	2016	Tippeligaen	11	4	0	0	–		0	0	–		11	4
Molde	2017	Eliteserien	27	16	3	1	–		-		–		30	17
Molde	Total		38	20	3	1	–	–	0	0	–	–	41	21
Rostov	2017–18	Russian Premier League	6	1	–		–		–		–		6	1
Rostov	2018–19	Russian Premier League	26	5	–		–		–		–		26	5
Rostov	2019–20	Russian Premier League	6	2	1	0	–		–		–		7	2
Rostov	Total		38	8	1	0	–	–	0	0	–	–	39	8
Lillestrøm	2020	OBOS-ligaen	7	1	–		–		–		–		7	1
Molde	2021	Eliteserien	1	0	1	0	–		7	1	–		8	1
Molde	2022	Eliteserien	0	0	0	0	–		0	0	–		0	0
Career total			282	63	22	11	12	3	9	2	2	0	327	79

=== International ===
As of match played 9 September 2018

Appearances and goals by national team and year
National team	Year	Apps	Goals
Iceland	2011	1	0
Iceland	2012	0	0
Iceland	2013	0	0
Iceland	2014	0	0
Iceland	2015	0	0
Iceland	2016	2	0
Iceland	2017	6	1
Iceland	2018	8	0
Total		17	1

As of match played 24 March 2018
Scores and results list Iceland's goal tally first, score column indicates score after each Björn goal.

List of international goals scored by Björn Bergmann Sigurðarson
No.	Date	Venue	Cap	Opponent	Score	Result	Competition
1	24 March 2017	Loro Boriçi Stadium, Shkodër, Albania	6	Kosovo	1–0	2–1	2018 FIFA World Cup qualification

== Honours ==
Wolverhampton Wanderers

- Football League One: 2013–14

Molde

- Tippeligaen: 2014
- Norwegian Cup: 2014

Individual

- Molde top scorer: 17 goals in 2017
