= Oddvar Richardsen =

Norwegian footballer (1937-1997)

Personal information
- Full name: Oddvar Kåre Richardsen
- Date of birth: 5 June 1937
- Place of birth: Brønnøysund, Norway
- Date of death: 18 July 1997 (aged 60)
- Position: Forward

Senior career*
Years	Team	Apps	(Gls)
- Tjalg
- Brønnøysund
1957–1966	Lillestrøm		
1967–1971	Ull/Kisa		

International career
1958	Norway u-21	1	(0)
1960–1963	Norway B	5	(0)
1961–1963	Norway	4	(0)

Managerial career
- Ull/Kisa (player-coach)
- 1972: Lillestrøm
- 1973: Raumnes og Årnes
- * Club domestic league appearances and goals

Oddvar Richardsen (5 June 1937 – 18 July 1997) was a Norwegian football striker and later manager.

He started his career in local clubs Tjalg and Brønnøysund, and the first from Brønnøysund to become Norwegian league champion. He played for Lillestrøm from 1957, becoming league champion in 1959. He represented Norway as an under-21, B and senior international. From 1967 to 1971 he played for Ull/Kisa.

After a time as player-coach of Ull/Kisa, in 1972 he coached Lillestrøm, and ahead of the 1973 season he joined Raumnes og Årnes IL.

His son Rune Richardsen was also capped for Norway. They were the eighth father-son combination to be capped.
