= Martin Husár =

Slovak footballer

Personal information
- Full name: Martin Husár
- Date of birth: 1 February 1985 (age 41)
- Place of birth: Trnava, Czechoslovakia
- Height: 1.83 m (6 ft 0 in)
- Position: Left back

Team information
- Current team: FC Neded

Youth career
- 1991–1995: Lokomotíva Trnava
- 1995–2003: Spartak Trnava

Senior career*
| Years | Team | Apps | (Gls) |
| 2003–2006 | Spartak Trnava | 52 | (1) |
| 2006–2009 | Lillestrøm | 11 | (0) |
| 2007 | → Ham-Kam (loan) | 5 | (0) |
| 2008–2009 | → Spartak Trnava (loan) | 13 | (0) |
| 2010–2011 | Brno | 38 | (0) |
| 2011–2012 | Zlaté Moravce | 12 | (0) |
| 2012–2013 | Brno | 36 | (0) |
| 2014 | Nitra | 11 | (0) |
| 2014 | Příbram | 2 | (0) |
| 2015– | Neded | | |
- * Club domestic league appearances and goals as of 6 September 2015

Martin Husár (born 1 February 1985) is a Slovak footballer who plays for FC Neded as a defender.
