= Lars-Kristian Eriksen =

Norwegian footballer (born 1983)

Personal information
- Full name: Lars-Kristian Eriksen
- Date of birth: 28 June 1983 (age 43)
- Place of birth: Ålesund, Norway
- Height: 1.77 m (5 ft 10 in)
- Position: Defender

Youth career
- Aalesund
- Lyn

Senior career*
Years	Team	Apps	(Gls)
2002–2008	Lyn	95	(0)
2009–2011	Lillestrøm	68	(0)
2012–2017	Odd	81	(2)

International career
2002	Norway U19	3	(0)
2002–2005	Norway U21	19	(2)
- * Club domestic league appearances and goals

Lars-Kristian "Lasse" Eriksen (born 28 June 1983) is a Norwegian former footballer who last played for Odd in the Norwegian top division. Eriksen has played 19 games for Norway U21 national football team.

He started his career with Norwegian side Aalesunds FK, but transferred to Lyn in 2002. He came through the Lyn youth system, having attended the Norwegian College of Elite Sport. After the 2008 campaign he left Lyn to join Lillestrøm SK. Autumn 2011 he signed for Odd Grenland, binding him to the club from 1 January 2012.

He is a member of the Christian sports organization Kristen Idrettskontakt (KRIK).

== Career statistics ==
Season	Club	Division	League		Cup		Total	
Season	Club	Division	Apps	Goals	Apps	Goals	Apps	Goals
2002	Lyn	Tippeligaen	0	0	1	1	1	1
2003	Lyn	Tippeligaen	10	0	4	0	14	0
2004	Lyn	Tippeligaen	23	0	7	0	30	0
2005	Lyn	Tippeligaen	17	0	1	0	18	0
2006	Lyn	Tippeligaen	13	0	2	0	15	0
2007	Lyn	Tippeligaen	15	0	2	0	17	0
2008	Lyn	Tippeligaen	17	0	5	1	22	1
2009	Lillestrøm	Tippeligaen	15	0	1	0	16	0
2010	Lillestrøm	Tippeligaen	26	0	3	0	29	0
2011	Lillestrøm	Tippeligaen	27	0	3	0	30	0
2012	Odd	Tippeligaen	9	1	1	0	10	1
2013	Odd	Tippeligaen	12	0	2	0	14	0
2014	Odd	Tippeligaen	25	0	4	0	29	0
2015	Odd	Tippeligaen	26	1	3	0	29	1
2016	Odd	Tippeligaen	9	0	3	0	11	0
Career Total			244	2	42	2	276	4

== Personal life ==
Lars-Kristian Eriksen is married to blogger Caroline Berg Eriksen.
