= Edwin Eziyodawe =

Nigerian football midfielder

Personal information
- Full name: Edwin Eziyodawe
- Date of birth: 9 May 1988 (age 38)
- Place of birth: Benin City, Nigeria
- Height: 1.84 m (6 ft 1/2 in)
- Position: Striker

Team information
- Current team: As Police (Niger)

Senior career*
Years	Team	Apps	(Gls)
2006–2007	Bendel Insurance F.C.		
2007–2008	Enyimba FC	20	(9)
2011–2012	Sharks FC	42	(7)
2009–2011	Lillestrøm SK		
2014–2015	Rangers International		
2015–2016	Shabab Ghazieh FC		(6)
2017–2019	Kwara United		
2019–2020	As Police (Niger)		
- * Club domestic league appearances and goals as of 1 February 2010 ‡ National team caps and goals as of 1 February 2010

Edwin Eziyodawe (born 9 May 1988 in Benin City), is a Nigerian football midfielder.

== Career ==
Eziyodawe began his career with Bendel Insurance F.C. and was promoted to the senior squad in 2006. He earned his first caps in the Nigerian FA Cup, and scored his first professional goal on 20 October 2006, in the final against Dolphins F.C. After two years with Bendel Insurance F.C. he signed for league rival Sharks F.C. in February 2008. On 22 January 2009 was signed by Lillestrøm SK in Norway.

== Career statistics ==
Season	Club	Division	League		Cup		Total	
Season	Club	Division	Apps	Goals	Apps	Goals	Apps	Goals
2009	Lillestrøm	Tippeligaen	24	6	2	1	26	7
2010	Lillestrøm	Tippeligaen	18	1	0	0	18	1
2011	Lillestrøm	Tippeligaen	0	0	0	0	0	0
Career Total			42	7	2	1	44	8

2011-2012 Sharks Fc
