= Karim Essediri =

Footballer (born 1979)

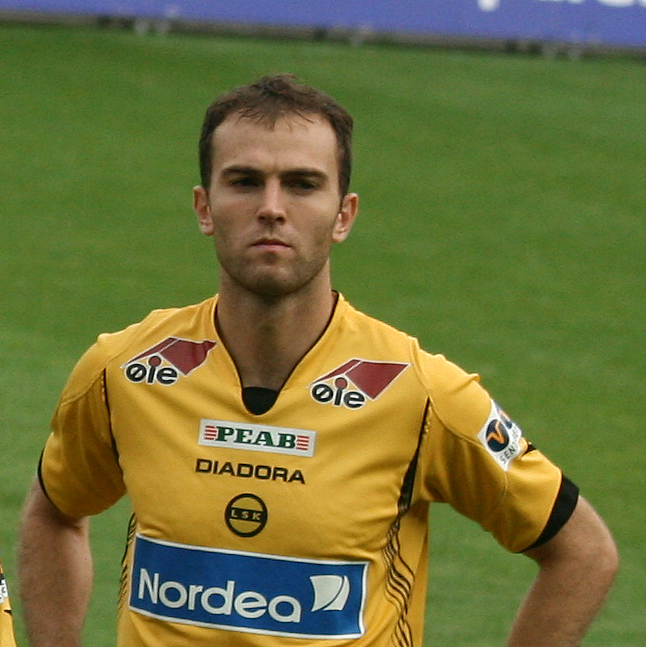
- Essediri in 2008

Personal information
- Full name: Karim Essediri
- Date of birth: 29 July 1979 (age 47)
- Place of birth: Meaux, France
- Height: 1.85 m (6 ft 1 in)
- Position: Right winger

Youth career
- –1999: Red Star

Senior career*
Years	Team	Apps	(Gls)
1999–2001	Club Africain		
2001–2005	Tromsø	81	(6)
2002	→ Bodø/Glimt (loan)	13	(0)
2006	Rosenborg	8	(1)
2007–2011	Lillestrøm	103	(1)

International career
2004–2011	Tunisia	8	(0)

Managerial career
- Lillestrøm (youth)
- 2017: Eidsvold Turn
- Strømmen (youth)
- Oppsal (assistant)
- 2022: Eidsvold Turn
- * Club domestic league appearances and goals

Karim Essediri (Arabic: كريم السديري; born 29 July 1979) is a former professional footballer who played as a right winger. Born in France, he earned eight caps with the Tunisia national team at international level.

== Career ==
Essediri was born in Meaux. Before joining Lillestrøm in 2006, he played for Rosenborg, Bodø/Glimt and Tromsø in Norway, Club Meaux and Red Star 93 in France, and Club Africain in Tunisia.

Essediri experienced a tough start at Tromsø, and was given partial blame for the club's 2001 relegation. The following year he was lent out to another Norwegian club Bodø/Glimt. When he returned to Tromsø, he was not considered first-team material. However, the arrival of Per Mathias Høgmo as head coach made Essediri the starting right winger in Høgmo's counterattacking style of play. Essediri's pace made him an important figure in setting up Tromsø I.L.'s counterattacks, and he ended the 2004 season being among the top three for assists in the Premier League. Essediri had successfully turned from scapegoat in 2001 to hero in 2004.

Following his success at Tromsø, Essediri was picked for several matches for Tunisia, both in the World Cup 2006, and the 2005 Confederations Cup.

Having struggled to break into the Lillestrøm side, the 2009 season has seen Essediri convert to right back with success, and was a regular during the 2009-season.

In 2012 Essediri left Lillestrøm, trained with Kevin Knappen's Elverum before deciding to retire as a player. A last-minute move back to Tromsø was denied by the club's board, stating that the club could not afford Essediri's wages.

Essediri, who married a Norwegian woman from Sortland, settled in Lillestrøm. He was the manager of Lillestrøm U14, Eidsvold Turn, Strømmen U20 and assistant manager of Oppsal IF. In 2020 he was in the picture as IF Fløya's new manager, which would entail a return to Tromsø, but it fell through for economic reasons. The COVID-19 pandemic in Norway saw Essediri leave coaching for the time being to work in a kindergarten. In the second half of 2022, Essediri was brought back to Eidsvold Turn as their manager in an effort to save the team from relegation from the 2022 2. divisjon.

== Career statistics ==
Appearances and goals by club, season and competition
Season	Club	League			Cup		Total	
Season	Club	Division	Apps	Goals	Apps	Goals	Apps	Goals
Tromsø	2001	Eliteserien	21	2	5	1	26	3
Tromsø	2003	Eliteserien	14	0	4	2	18	2
Tromsø	2004	Eliteserien	25	3	4	3	29	6
Tromsø	2005	Eliteserien	21	1	1	0	22	1
Bodø/Glimt (loan)	2002	Eliteserien	13	0	2	2	15	2
Rosenborg	2006	Eliteserien	8	0	3	0	11	0
Lillestrøm	2007	Eliteserien	8	0	2	1	10	1
Lillestrøm	2008	Eliteserien	16	0	2	0	18	0
Lillestrøm	2009	Eliteserien	22	0	2	0	24	0
Lillestrøm	2010	Eliteserien	29	1	3	1	32	2
Lillestrøm	2011	Eliteserien	28	0	3	0	31	0
Career total			205	7	31	10	236	17
