= Espen Søgård =

Norwegian footballer (born 1979)

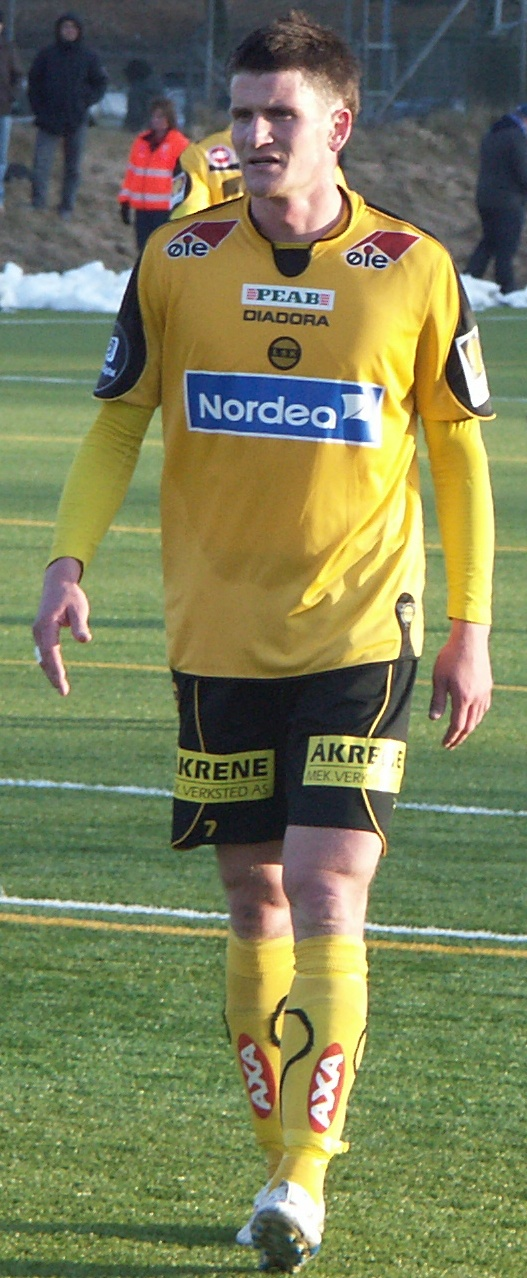

Personal information
- Date of birth: 10 October 1979 (age 47)
- Place of birth: Norway
- Position: Midfielder

Youth career
- –1997: Fet

Senior career*
Years	Team	Apps	(Gls)
1997–2011	Lillestrøm	278	(12)
2011–2012	Start	26	(2)
2012	Lillestrøm	4	(0)

International career
2005	Norway	2	(0)
- * Club domestic league appearances and goals

Espen Søgård (born 10 October 1979) is a Norwegian former footballer who played as a midfielder for Lillestrøm during most of his career.

Søgård have played most of his career at Lillestrøm, but had a short spell at Start from the summer of 2011 to the summer of 2012. Before transferring to Lillestrøm in 1997 he played youth football for Fet in Norway. He has been capped 9 times for the Norwegian under-21 team, and twice by the senior national team.

After the 2012 season he stepped down from professional football and rejoined Fet.

== Career statistics ==
Club	Season	Division	League		Cup		Total	
Club	Season	Division	Apps	Goals	Apps	Goals	Apps	Goals
1999	Lillestrøm	Tippeligaen	1	0	0	0	1	0
2000	Lillestrøm	Tippeligaen	15	0	3	0	18	0
2001	Lillestrøm	Tippeligaen	26	2	6	3	32	5
2002	Lillestrøm	Tippeligaen	25	0	3	0	28	0
2003	Lillestrøm	Tippeligaen	24	1	4	1	28	2
2004	Lillestrøm	Tippeligaen	24	2	6	1	30	3
2005	Lillestrøm	Tippeligaen	25	0	7	0	32	0
2006	Lillestrøm	Tippeligaen	24	1	3	0	27	1
2007	Lillestrøm	Tippeligaen	26	3	7	0	33	3
2008	Lillestrøm	Tippeligaen	18	0	2	0	20	0
2009	Lillestrøm	Tippeligaen	24	2	3	1	27	3
2010	Lillestrøm	Tippeligaen	29	1	3	0	32	1
2011	Lillestrøm	Tippeligaen	17	0	4	0	21	0
2011	Start	Tippeligaen	11	0	2	0	13	0
2012	Start	Adeccoligaen	15	2	4	1	19	3
2012	Lillestrøm	Tippeligaen	4	0	0	0	4	0
Career Total			308	14	57	7	365	21
