= Dan Alberto Fellus =

Norwegian-Israeli football striker (born 1987)

Dan Fellus
Personal information
- Full name: Dan Alberto Fellus
- Date of birth: 17 December 1987 (age 38)
- Place of birth: Israel
- Position: Striker

Youth career
- Bøler
- Vålerenga

Senior career*
Years	Team	Apps	(Gls)
2006	Vålerenga	0	(0)
2006	Hakoah Ramat Gan	0	(0)
2007	Gjøvik-Lyn	18	(5)
2007–2009	Lillestrøm	8	(0)
2009	→ Bærum SK (loan)	19	(8)
2010–2012	Bøler		
2012–2013	Strømmen	20	(2)
2014	Lørenskog		
2015	Teisen		

International career^{‡}
2006	Israel U19	1	(0)
- * Club domestic league appearances and goals as of 26 August 2013 ‡ National team caps and goals as of 29 December 2007

Dan Alberto Fellus (Hebrew: דן אלברטו פלוס; born 17 December 1987) is a Norwegian-Israeli football striker.

== Biography ==
Dan Alberto Fellus was born in Israel, where his family lived until he was three years old.

== Sports career ==
In 2006, Fellus made his professional debut coming off the bench for Vålerenga in a cup match and even got onto the score sheet within his twenty-one minutes on the pitch. After the 2006 season, Fellus travelled to Israel where he had an unsuccessful trial at Maccabi Tel Aviv. He also played at Hakoah Ramat Gan before he signed for the Norwegian Second Division team Gjøvik-Lyn. His club debut on 3 March 2007 saw Fellus get onto the scoresheet in a 2–1 win over Brumunddal. When league play started, he was the only one to get on the club's scoresheet in a 7–1 loss to Fredrikstad 2.

Later in 2007 he was picked up by Norwegian Premier Division outfit Lillestrøm SK. He did not play often and was loaned out to Bærum SK in 2009. In 2010, he returned to his original club Bøler IF. In mid-2012 he went up the league tier again as he signed for First Division team Strømmen IF. In 2014, he went to third-tier Lørenskog IF.

== National team ==
Fellus has played one match with the Israel U19 team in a friendly against the Northern Ireland U19s at Windsor Park in Belfast on 24 April 2006.
