= Magnus Myklebust =

Norwegian footballer (born 1985)

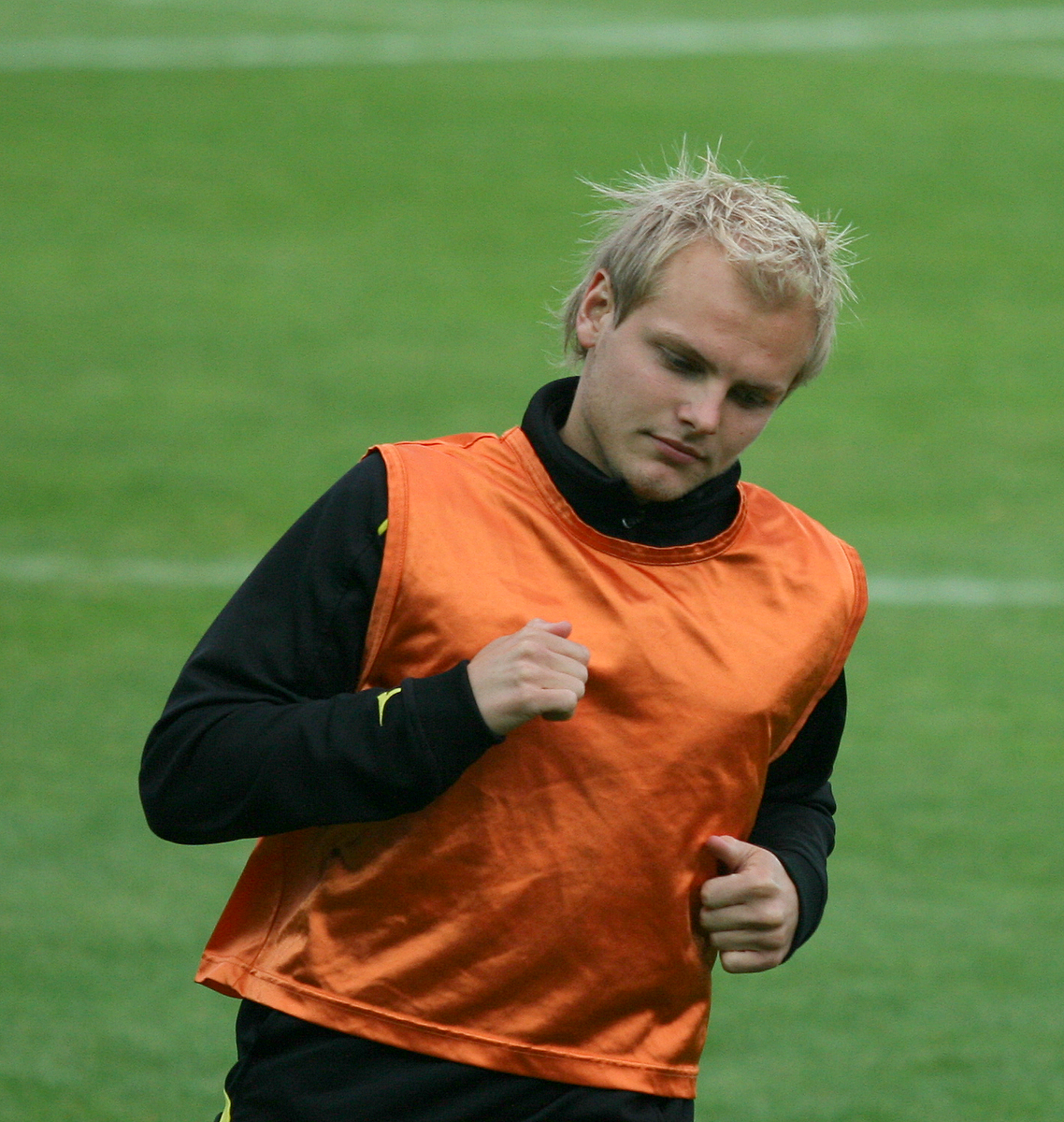

Personal information
- Full name: Magnus Waade Myklebust
- Date of birth: 8 July 1985 (age 41)
- Place of birth: Ulsteinvik, Norway
- Height: 1.72 m (5 ft 8 in)
- Positions: Left winger; right winger; striker

Team information
- Current team: Bergsöy

Youth career
- Gursken

Senior career*
Years	Team	Apps	(Gls)
2002–2004	Hødd	67	(30)
2005–2009	Lillestrøm	105	(13)
2010–2011	Odd Grenland	36	(4)
2012–2014	Kongsvinger	82	(30)
2015–2018	Hødd	68	(14)
2019–	Bergsöy	5	(3)

International career
2001	Norway U16	6	(0)
2002	Norway U17	3	(1)
2003	Norway U18	16	(4)
2002–2003	Norway U19	14	(3)
2005–2006	Norway U21	16	(4)
- * Club domestic league appearances and goals as of 22:39, 10 June 2019 (UTC)

Magnus Waade Myklebust (born 8 July 1985) is a Norwegian football striker who currently plays for Bergsöy IL.

He is the cousin of Jan Åge Fjørtoft.

== Career statistics ==
As of 9 November 2018

Season	Club	Division	League		Cup		Total	
Season	Club	Division	Apps	Goals	Apps	Goals	Apps	Goals
2002	Hødd	Adeccoligaen	26	11	1	1	27	12
2003	Hødd	Adeccoligaen	18	3	2	0	20	2
2004	Hødd	Adeccoligaen	23	16	0	0	23	16
2005	Lillestrøm	Tippeligaen	19	3	6	1	25	4
2006	Lillestrøm	Tippeligaen	15	1	2	1	17	2
2007	Lillestrøm	Tippeligaen	25	7	5	0	30	7
2008	Lillestrøm	Tippeligaen	19	1	2	0	21	1
2009	Lillestrøm	Tippeligaen	27	1	4	0	31	1
2010	Odd Grenland	Tippeligaen	21	3	2	0	23	3
2011	Odd Grenland	Tippeligaen	15	1	3	1	18	2
2012	Kongsvinger	Adeccoligaen	28	7	3	1	31	8
2013	Kongsvinger	Adeccoligaen	29	9	3	1	32	10
2014	Kongsvinger	2. divisjon	25	14	3	4	28	18
2015	Hødd	OBOS-ligaen	28	8	3	2	31	10
2016	Hødd	OBOS-ligaen	7	0	2	1	9	1
2017	Hødd	PostNord-ligaen	11	0	2	0	13	0
2018	Hødd	PostNord-ligaen	22	6	1	1	23	7
Career Total			358	91	44	14	402	105
