= Marius Johnsen =

Norwegian footballer (born 1981)

Personal information
- Date of birth: 28 August 1981 (age 45)
- Place of birth: Kristiansand, Norway
- Height: 1.85 m (6 ft 1 in)
- Position: Left back

Youth career
- FK Vigør

Senior career*
Years	Team	Apps	(Gls)
–2002	FK Vigør		
2002–2006	IK Start	123	(29)
2006–2007	→ 1. FC Köln (loan)	12	(0)
2007–2010	Lillestrøm	30	(2)

International career
2005–2007	Norway	7	(0)
- * Club domestic league appearances and goals

Marius Johnsen (born 28 August 1981) is a Norwegian former professional football defender. His older brother Espen Johnsen is also a former professional goalkeeper.

== Career ==
During the summer of 2005, he made his debut on the Norwegian national team.

In the end of 2006, Johnsen signed a loan contract with 1. FC Köln in the German 2. Bundesliga that expired at the end of the German 2. Bundesliga season in May. He made his debut for the German club on 26 January 2007 victory against SV Wacker Burghausen. On 14 June 2007, Lillestrøm SK officially announced the signing of Johnsen on a five-year deal.

Since he signed for Lillestrøm he has been constantly injured. On 25 August 2010, it was reported that he needed a knee surgery and would be out for at least a year, up to a year and a half.

== Career statistics ==
Season	Club	Division	League		Cup		Total	
Season	Club	Division	Apps	Goals	Apps	Goals	Apps	Goals
2002	IK Start	Tippeligaen	14	0	3	1	17	1
2003	IK Start	Adeccoligaen	29	10	1	0	30	10
2004	IK Start	Adeccoligaen	30	8	0	0	30	8
2005	IK Start	Tippeligaen	25	8	3	0	28	8
2006	IK Start	Tippeligaen	24	4	4	1	28	5
2006–07	1. FC Köln	2. Fußball-Bundesliga	12	0	0	0	12	0
2007	Lillestrøm	Tippeligaen	9	0	2	0	11	0
2008	Lillestrøm	Tippeligaen	3	0	0	0	3	0
2009	Lillestrøm	Tippeligaen	17	2	2	1	19	3
2010	Lillestrøm	Tippeligaen	1	0	1	0	2	0
Career Total			164	32	16	3	180	35

== Personal life ==
Johnsen has previously studied religion at the Agder University College, planning to teach history and/or religion at a college or University. Like the rest of his family, he is involved in the activities of the Norwegian Free Church. Like his brother, he has made a mark in the national press for publicly expressing his religious beliefs.
