= Kjetil Sælen =

Norwegian football referee

Kjetil Sælen (born February 21, 1969) is a Norwegian football referee from Bergen. He debuted as a referee in 1997. And has been a Norwegian Premier League-referee since 2004. Sælen represents Arna-Bjørnar where he also is the CEO.
