= Tore Andreas Gundersen =

Norwegian footballer (born 1986)

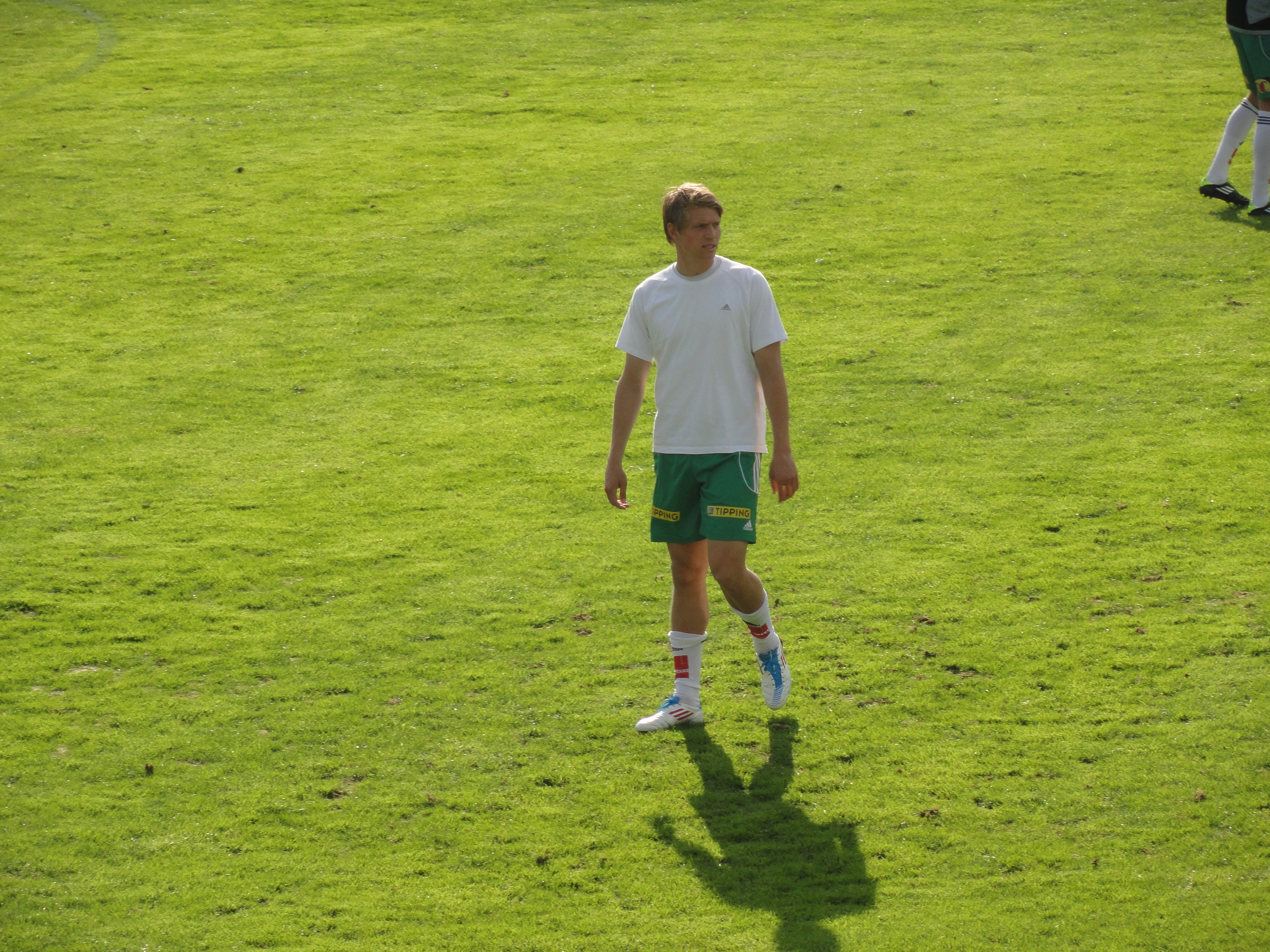

Personal information
- Date of birth: 4 February 1986 (age 40)
- Place of birth: Kongsvinger, Norway
- Height: 1.90 m (6 ft 3 in)
- Position: Striker

Youth career
- 1999–2003: Flisa

Senior career*
Years	Team	Apps	(Gls)
2003–2006	Kongsvinger	54	(17)
2007–2009	Lillestrøm	10	(0)
2008	→ Lyngby (loan)	9	(4)
2009	→ Nybergsund (loan)	28	(13)
2010–2011	Dynamo Dresden	17	(3)
2011–2014	HamKam	94	(31)
2014	Ullensaker/Kisa	6	(0)
2015–2018	Flisa		

International career
2004	Norway U18	3	(1)
2005	Norway U19	1	(0)
2006–2008	Norway U21	11	(2)
- * Club domestic league appearances and goals

Tore Andreas Gundersen (born 4 February 1986) is a retired football player.

Gundersen was born in Kongsvinger, grew up in Flisa and is a son of politician and former swimmer Gunnar Gundersen. Gundersen began his career with Flisa IL, before joining Kongsvinger IL in January 2003. After three years there he signed for Lillestrøm SK in January 2007. After a disappointing season he joined Lyngby Boldklub on a loan in August 2008. In Denmark he scored four goals in nine games for Lyngby Boldklub and returned to Lillestrøm, and was subsequently loaned out to Nybergsund IL-Trysil in January 2009. In January 2010, he moved to Germany, joining Dynamo Dresden of the 3. Liga. Ahead of the 2011 season he joined Hamarkameratene.

== Career statistics ==
As of 20 November 2014

Season	Club	Division	League		Cup		Total	
Season	Club	Division	Apps	Goals	Apps	Goals	Apps	Goals
2004	Kongsvinger	1. divisjon	5	0	0	0	5	0
2005	Kongsvinger	1. divisjon	19	3	0	0	19	3
2006	Kongsvinger	1. divisjon	30	14	1	2	31	16
2007	Lillestrøm	Tippeligaen	3	0	2	2	5	2
2008	Lillestrøm	Tippeligaen	7	0	1	0	8	0
2008	Lyngby	1st Division	9	4	0	0	9	4
2009	Nybergsund	1. divisjon	28	13	0	0	28	13
2009–10	Dynamo Dresden	3. Fußball-Liga	9	2	0	0	9	2
2010–11	Dynamo Dresden	3. Fußball-Liga	8	1	0	0	8	1
2011	HamKam	1. divisjon	28	9	2	1	30	10
2012	HamKam	1. divisjon	26	16	2	1	28	17
2013	HamKam	1. divisjon	25	5	2	1	27	6
2014	HamKam	1. divisjon	15	1	3	1	18	2
2014	Ullensaker/Kisa	1. divisjon	6	0	0	0	6	0
Career Total			218	68	13	8	231	76
