= LSK-Hallen =

Indoor football arena in Lillestrøm, Norway

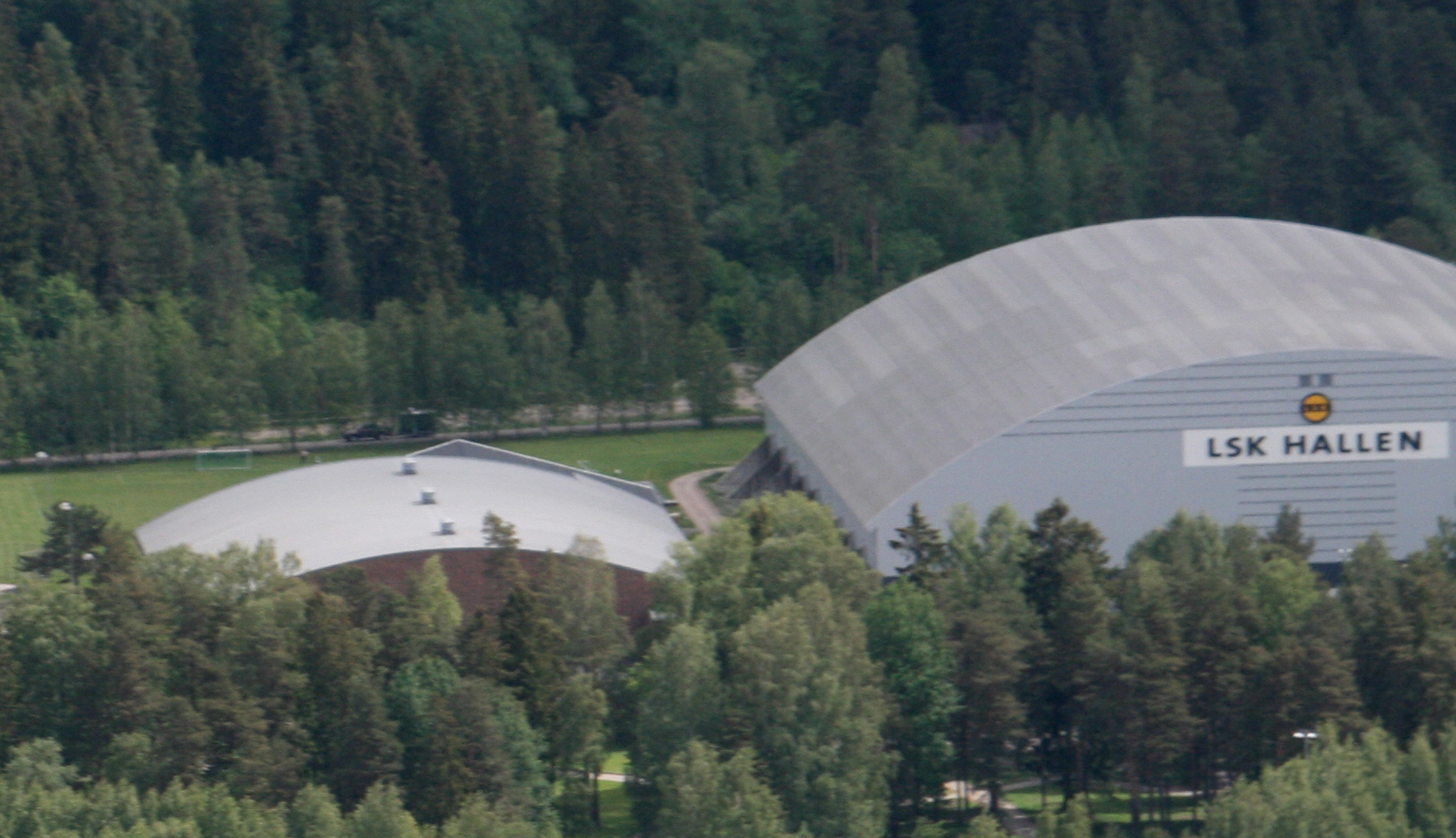

- Location within Norway South Location within Norway
- Address: Lillestrøm; Norway
- Coordinates: 59.962186°N 11.068983°E
- Owner: Lillestrøm SK
- Operator: Lillestrøm SK
- Capacity: 1,800
- Type: Arena
- Record attendance: 1,800
- Current use: Indoor football

Tenant
- LSK Kvinner FK

LSK-Hallen is an indoor football arena with an artificial turf in Lillestrøm, Norway. It is owned, used, and operated by Lillestrøm Sportsklubb. It has a capacity of 1,800 people. LSK-hallen is the home ground for LSK 2 and LSK's junior teams, in addition to the women's football team LSK Kvinner FK. During the winter months, the hall is used by several football clubs for both training sessions and arranging friendly matches.

The hall was officially opened on 13 October 2007. However, the first senior match was played two days earlier, on 11 October, when Lillestrøm SK defeated their affiliate club Bærum SK 5-1. The first goal scorer in the new hall was Bærum's Eldar Hadzimehmedovic. The attendance record of 1,800 spectators was set during an exhibition game between LSK and LSK All-Stars on 18 December 2009. LSK-hallen has a potential capacity of 3,000 spectators, however, according to fire regulations, only about 1,800 spectators are permitted in the hall.

The name "LSK-hallen" was chosen through a naming competition. A total of 446 suggestions were submitted to the jury, 22 of which matched the name the jury deemed most suitable for the venue.

In 2008 and 2009, LSK-hallen served as the home ground for Team Strømmen. Since 2010, it has been the home ground of LSK Kvinner.
