= Olivier Occéan =

Canadian soccer player

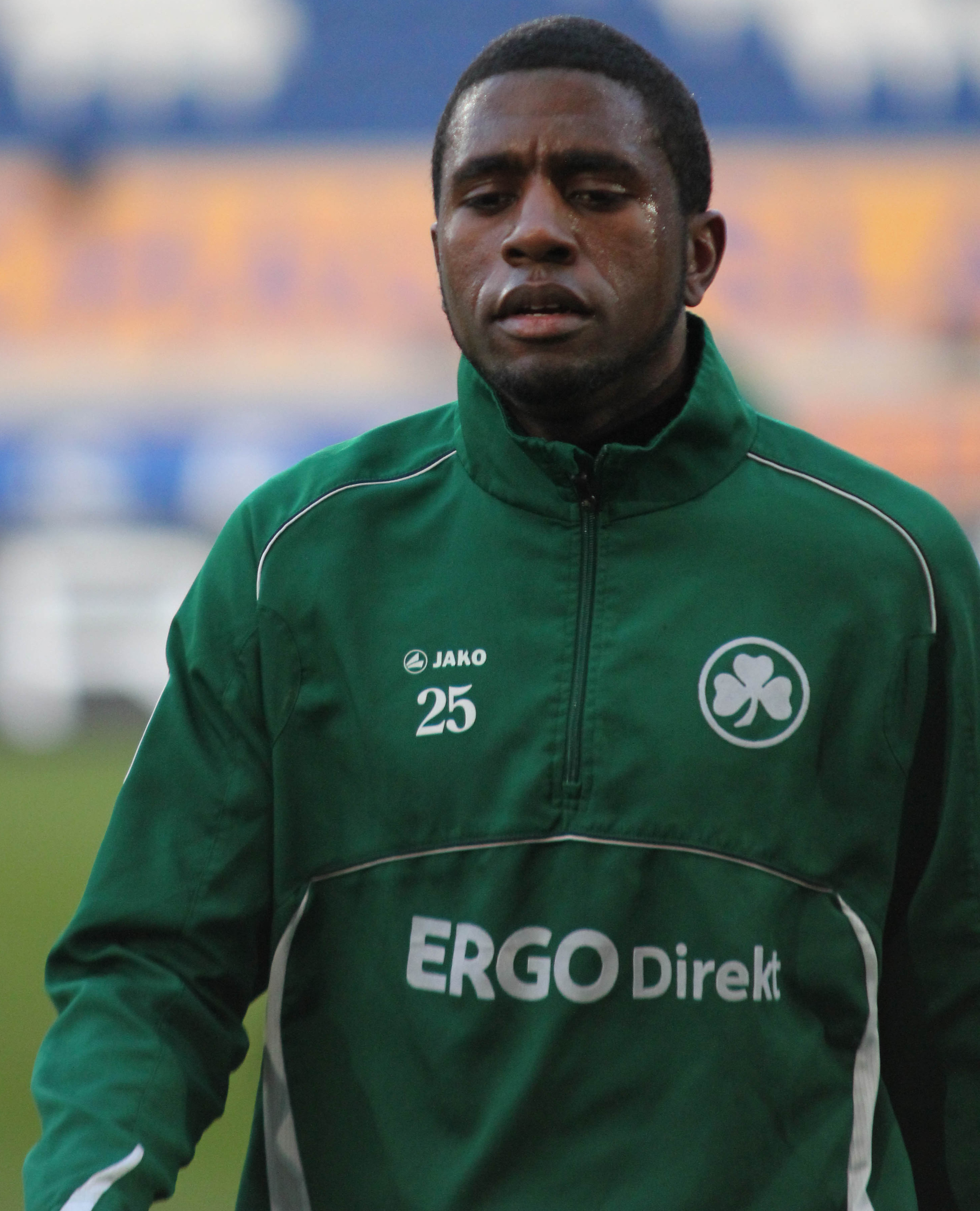
- Occéan with Greuther Fürth in 2012

Personal information
- Full name: Olivier Occéan
- Date of birth: October 23, 1981 (age 45)
- Place of birth: Brossard, Quebec, Canada
- Height: 1.85 m (6 ft 1 in)
- Position: Striker

Team information
- Current team: Urædd (assistant coach)

Youth career
- 1998–2000: Longueuil Select Rive-Sud
- 2000: Essex County College
- 2001–2003: SCSU Fighting Owls

Senior career*
Years	Team	Apps	(Gls)
2002–2003	Vermont Voltage	30	(19)
2004–2006	Odd	46	(22)
2006–2010	Lillestrøm SK	91	(33)
2010–2011	Kickers Offenbach	30	(16)
2011–2012	Greuther Fürth	33	(17)
2012–2015	Eintracht Frankfurt	18	(1)
2013–2014	→ 1. FC Kaiserslautern (loan)	27	(3)
2015	→ Odd (loan)	17	(7)
2015–2017	Odd	62	(20)
2018	Urædd	8	(9)
2018–2019	Mjøndalen	39	(11)
2020	Urædd	4	(8)

International career
2004–2012	Canada	28	(6)

Managerial career
- 2020: Urædd (player-assistant)
- 2021–: Urædd (assistant)
- * Club domestic league appearances and goals

Olivier Occéan (French pronunciation: [ɔlivje ɔkseɑ̃]), born October 23, 1981) is a retired Canadian professional soccer player and current assistant coach of IF Urædd.

== Club career ==
=== College soccer ===
Occéan played college soccer at Essex County College, Newark NJ in NJCAA Division 1 and at Southern Connecticut State University for the Fighting Owls in the NCAA Division II, from 2001 to 2003. While at the college, Occéan was twice named an NCAA All-American. He finished his career with 57 goals, including 21 as a senior, and 22 in 2001. During this time he also played for Vermont Voltage in the USL Premier Development League.

Upon graduating from college, Occéan was selected 26th overall in the 2004 MLS SuperDraft by the MetroStars. Occéan didn't surprise many after coming from a powerhouse Division II program, which had won six NCAA titles, and looked likely to make the team. However, Occéan did surprise when, while the MetroStars were playing in the preseason La Manga Cup, Occéan impressed the Metrostars' competitors Odd Grenland so much that the team immediately offered him a contract. With Major League Soccer not willing to compete financially with the Norwegian club, Occéan ended up with Odd.

=== Odd ===
Occéan quickly impressed in Norway, earning a starting spot and immediately scoring goals. In his first season with Odd, Occéan led the team in goals with 14, although the team slumped to a mid-table finish.

=== Lillestrøm SK ===
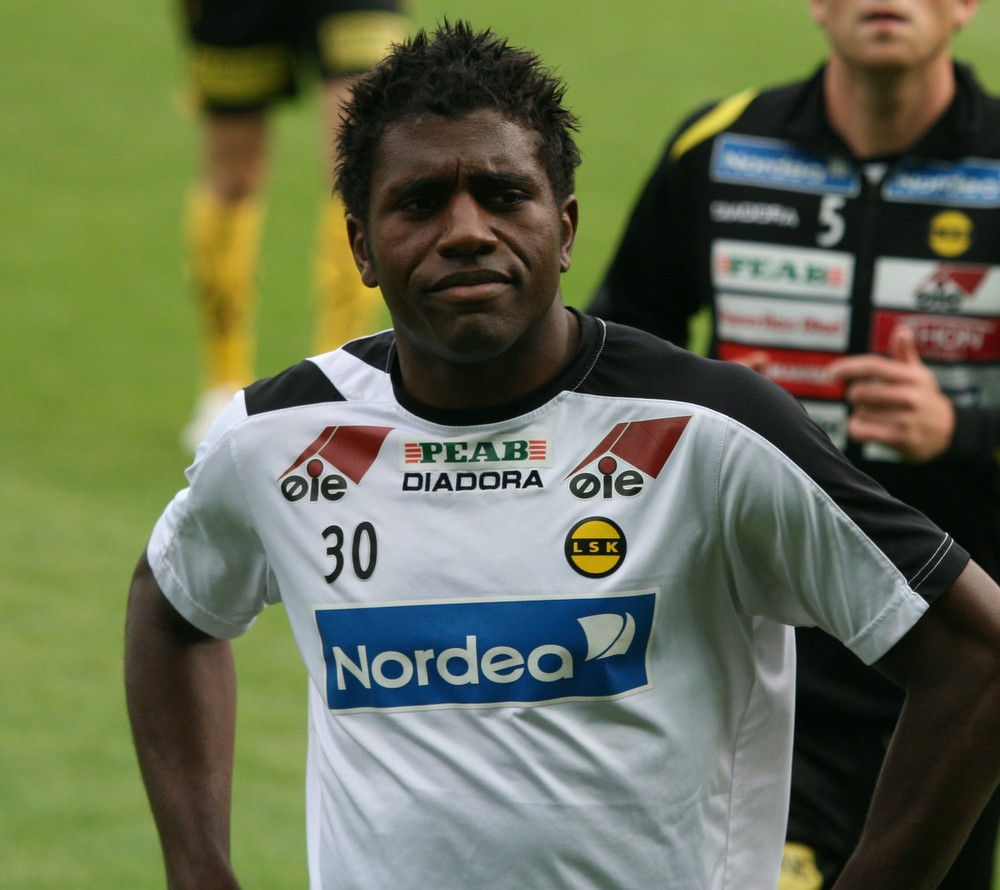
Occéan with Lillestrøm

He signed a five-year contract with Lillestrøm on December 10, 2005. The deal was worth approximately €885,000 plus about €126,000 in possible incentive pay. After a promising start however, his first season with the club was marred by a five-month goal-drought broken only in the very last match of the season. Occéan then faced the challenge of living up to the price tag and in the 2007 and 2008 seasons, the muscular striker bagged in 12 goals for the club.

=== Kickers Offenbach ===
Prior to the start of the 2010–11 season, Occean moved to Germany, joining 3. Liga side Kickers Offenbach on a free transfer. He got off to a perfect start, netting four goals in his first three league appearances, thus becoming an instant favorite with Kickers fans. In his only season at the club, he scored 16 goals in 30 matches.

=== Greuther Fürth ===
It was announced in the German media on May 25, 2011 that Occéan had signed a three-year contract with SpVgg Greuther Fürth until June 2014. Occéan made his debut for his new team on July 15 in a 3–2 home defeat to Eintracht Frankfurt. One week later, Occéan once again started for SpVgg Fürth and scored two goals leading the team to a 4–0 road victory over 1. FC Union Berlin. Occéan scored one of the most important goals of the season in the DFB-Pokal quarter finals, scoring the game winner in the 44th minute against Hoffenheim on February 8, 2012. On March 1, 2012 he was named the Canada Soccer Player of the Month for February based on his club team performances, and again for the month of March. Occéan helped lead Greuther Fürth to win the 2. Bundesliga championship. He was also awarded the league's top scorer with 17 goals in 30 appearances, Nick Proschwitz and Alexander Meier scored the same number of goals within the league, however Occéan tallied more assists.

=== Eintracht Frankfurt ===
On July 3, 2012, Occéan transferred to Eintracht Frankfurt for €1.3 million signing a three-year contract, where he would be joining fellow Canadian Rob Friend. Occéan made his top flight debut for Frankfurt on August 25 playing all 90 minutes in a 2–1 away victory over Bayer Leverkusen. On September 15, 2012, Occéan scored his first Bundesliga goal in his third appearance for the club. He scored the second goal in an eventual 3–2 victory against Hamburger SV.

=== 1. FC Kaiserslautern ===
It was announced on July 1, 2013 that Occéan was loaned to 1. FC Kaiserslautern of the 2. Bundesliga on a two-year loan with an option for the loan to be extended even further after the 2012–13 season in which he scored only once for Frankfurt in 17 appearances.

=== Second spell at Odd ===
On January 6, 2015, Occéan signed a half-year loan deal with his former club Odd, who plays in the Norwegian Eliteserien. On July 8, 2015, Occéan signed a two-and-a-half-year contract with Odd.

=== Urædd Fotball ===
In 2018, Occéan signed with Urædd Fotball of the 3. divisjon. Occéan concurrently also began his coaching career as a youth coach at Urædd.

After two seasons at Mjøndalen, he returned to Urædd Fotball for the 2020 season as a playing assistant coach. He ended his player career at the end of 2020 and continued at Urædd in his role as an assistant coach for the team and youth coach.

== International career ==
Born in Canada, Occéan is of Haitian descent. He made his debut for Canada in a May 2004 friendly match against Wales and until the end of 2012 he has earned a total of 28 caps, scoring six goals. He has represented Canada in 15 FIFA World Cup qualification matches (four goals) and at the 2005 CONCACAF Gold Cup. He scored Canada's first and only goal from a header in a 1–0 win against Cuba in Havana, during the opening match of the semi-final round of 2014 FIFA World Cup qualification. On February 11, 2013 FIFA ruled that Occéan had committed an act of unsporting conduct, displayed several acts of unsporting behavior, and used offensive language towards match officials during a 2014 World Cup qualifying match against Cuba on October 12, 2012. As part of the ruling, Occéan received a 6-match suspension. It was later determined that only Canada's official competitive matches, not friendlies, count toward the suspension meaning that the earliest that Occéan would be available for selection would be the final of the 2013 CONCACAF Gold Cup, if Canada were to advance that far in the tournament.

== Career statistics ==
=== Club ===
As of match played November 24, 2019

Appearances and goals by club, season and competition
Club	Season	League			National Cup		Continental		Total	
Club	Season	Division	Apps	Goals	Apps	Goals	Apps	Goals	Apps	Goals
Odd	2004	Eliteserien	24	14	1	0	4	3	29	17
Odd	2005	Eliteserien	22	8	3	3	–		25	11
Odd	Total		46	22	4	3	4	3	54	28
Lillestrøm	2006	Eliteserien	23	7	3	4	–		26	11
Lillestrøm	2007	Eliteserien	25	12	7	3	2	1	34	16
Lillestrøm	2008	Eliteserien	26	11	1	2	2	1	29	14
Lillestrøm	2009	Eliteserien	14	2	2	0	–		16	2
Lillestrøm	2010	Eliteserien	3	1	2	1	–		5	2
Lillestrøm	Total		91	33	15	10	4	2	110	45
Kickers Offenbach	2010–11	3. Liga	30	16	3	0	–		33	16
Greuther Fürth	2011–12	2. Bundesliga	33	17	5	2	–		38	19
Eintracht Frankfurt	2012–13	Bundesliga	18	1	1	0	–		19	1
1. FC Kaiserslautern (loan)	2013–14	2. Bundesliga	27	3	4	3	–		31	6
Odd (loan)	2015	Eliteserien	17	7	0	0	0	0	17	7
Odd	2015	Eliteserien	10	8	2	1	8	4	20	13
Odd	2016	Eliteserien	28	10	1	0	2	1	31	11
Odd	2017	Eliteserien	24	2	2	0	6	1	32	3
Odd	Total		79	27	5	1	16	6	100	34
Urædd	2018	3. divisjon	8	9	1	0	–		9	9
Mjøndalen	2018	1. divisjon	14	5	0	0	–		14	5
Mjøndalen	2019	Eliteserien	24	6	1	0	–		25	6
Mjøndalen	Total		38	11	1	0	0	0	39	11
Career total			370	137	39	19	24	11	433	169

=== International goals ===
Scores and results list Canada's goal tally first, score column indicates score after each Occéan goal.

List of international goals scored by Olivier Occéan
No.	Date	Venue	Opponent	Score	Result	Competition
1	February 9, 2005	Windsor Park, Belfast, Northern Ireland	Northern Ireland	1–0	1–0	Friendly
2	August 22, 2007	Laugardalsvöllur, Reykjavík, Iceland	Iceland	1–1	1–1	Friendly
3	October 7, 2011	Beausejour Stadium, Gros Islet, Saint Lucia	Saint Lucia	3–0	7–0	2014 FIFA World Cup qualification
4	October 7, 2011	Beausejour Stadium, Gros Islet, Saint Lucia	Saint Lucia	5–0	7–0	2014 FIFA World Cup qualification
5	November 15, 2011	BMO Field, Toronto, Canada	Saint Kitts and Nevis	1–0	4–0	2014 FIFA World Cup qualification
6	June 8, 2012	Estadio Pedro Marrero, Havana, Cuba	Cuba	1–0	1–0	2014 FIFA World Cup qualification

== Honours ==
Lillestrøm SK

- Norwegian Cup: 2007

Greuther Fürth

- 2. Bundesliga (Promotion to the Bundesliga): 2011–12

Individual

- Canada Soccer Player of the Month: February 2012, March 2012
- 2. Bundesliga top goalscorer: 2011–12
