= Arild Sundgot =

Norwegian footballer (born 1978)

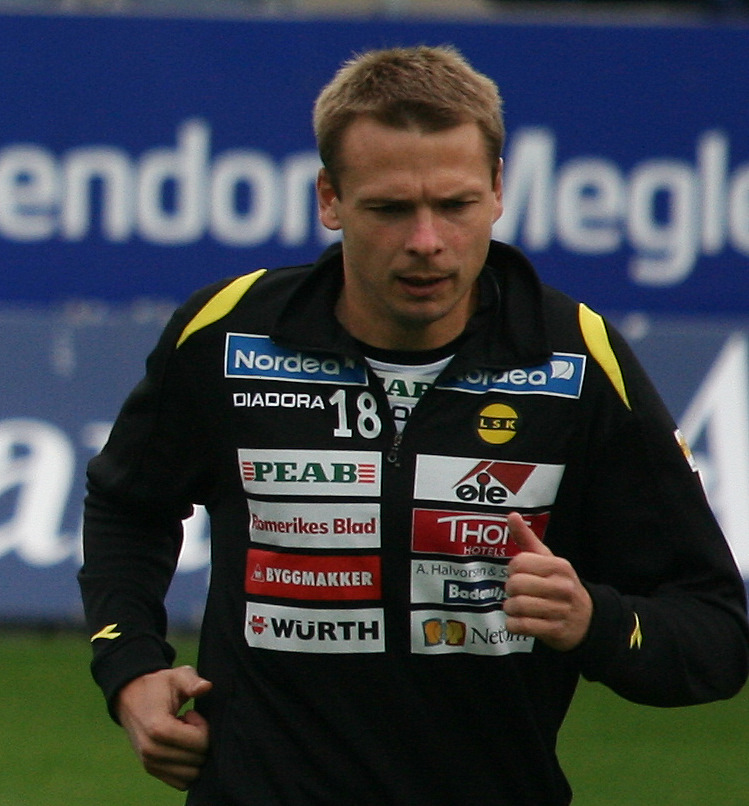
- Arild Sundgot at Viking Stadion in 2008

Personal information
- Full name: Arild Gilbert Sundgot
- Date of birth: 17 April 1978 (age 48)
- Place of birth: Ulsteinvik, Norway
- Height: 1.90 m (6 ft 3 in)
- Position: Striker

Team information
- Current team: Lillestrøm (player developer)

Youth career
- Hødd

Senior career*
| Years | Team | Apps | (Gls) |
| 1995–1996 | Hødd | | |
| 1997–2012 | Lillestrøm | 312 | (108) |

International career
| 1995 | Norway U-18 | 4 | (1) |
| 1996 | Norway U-19 | 2 | (1) |
| 1996–1997 | Norway U-20 | 3 | (2) |
| 1997–1999 | Norway U-21 | 10 | (3) |

Managerial career
- 2012–: Lillestrøm (coach)
- –2016: Lillestrøm (assistant)
- 2016–2017: Hødd (assistant)
- 2017–2019: Lillestrøm (assistant)
- 2021: Ull/Kisa (assistant)
- 2021: Ull/Kisa
- 2024–2025: Kolbotn women
- 2026–: Lillestrøm (developer)
- * Club domestic league appearances and goals

Arild Gilbert Sundgot (born 17 April 1978) is a Norwegian former footballer who played as a striker.

== Career ==
He is the younger brother of Ole Bjørn Sundgot, and the son of Otto Sundgot. He was capped several times on youth and under-21 level. He started playing for Lillestrøm in 1997, when he was brought from Hødd by Even Pellerud, the Lillestrøm manager at that time. He is considered one of the best players in the history of LSK, having scored more than 100 league goals during his 15 years tenure at the club.

In the summer of 2012 Sundgot started a tenure as coach in Lillestrøm. He eventually became assistant manager under Arne Erlandsen. In December 2016 he was announced as the new assistant manager of Hødd. However, he was not able to harmonize the job situation with his family, and thus resigned and promptly signed a new two-year contract in Lillestrøm. Lillestrøm won the 2017 Norwegian Cup final during that time.

Residing in Jessheim since the mid-2010s, Sundgot was hired as assistant manager of local second-tier club Ull/Kisa ahead of the 2021 season. In the summer of 2021 he was promoted to manager, on a contract spanning the rest of 2021. He was sacked on 3 October.

In late October 2025, Kolbotn slumped to last place in the 2025 Toppserien table. Arild Sundgot was sacked, with his assistent becoming caretaker for the last two games. He returned to Lillestrøm, though continuing within women's football, as Sundgot became head of player development for girls in Lillestrøm SK as well as the elite team LSK Kvinner FK.
