= 2018 Sarpsborg 08 FF season =

Sarpsborg 08
2018 season
- Chairman: Hans Petter Arnesen
- Manager: Geir Bakke
- Stadium: Sarpsborg Stadion
- Eliteserien: 8th
- Norwegian Cup: Third round vs HamKam
- UEFA Europa League: Group stage
- Top goalscorer: League: Patrick Mortensen (12); All: Patrick Mortensen (16)
Home colours	Away colours	Third colours

The 2018 season was Sarpsborg 08's seventh season in Eliteserien, following their return to the top level in 2012. It was also their fourth season with Geir Bakke as their manager.

== Squad ==
As of 8 September 2018

Note: Flags indicate national team as defined under FIFA eligibility rules; some limited exceptions apply. Players may hold more than one non-FIFA nationality.

No.	Pos.	Nation	Player
2	DF	NOR	Sulayman Bojang
3	DF	NOR	Jørgen Horn
4	DF	NOR	Bjørn Inge Utvik
5	DF	ISL	Orri Sigurður Ómarsson
6	DF	EST	Joonas Tamm (on loan from Flora)
7	MF	NOR	Ole Jørgen Halvorsen
8	MF	DEN	Matti Lund Nielsen
10	MF	NOR	Tobias Heintz
11	DF	NOR	Joackim Jørgensen
14	MF	NGR	Mohammed Usman
15	MF	NOR	Gaute Høberg Vetti
16	DF	NOR	Joachim Thomassen
17	MF	NOR	Kristoffer Zachariassen

No.	Pos.	Nation	Player
18	FW	DEN	Mikkel Agger
19	FW	NOR	Kristoffer Larsen
22	MF	NOR	Jon-Helge Tveita
23	MF	NOR	Harmeet Singh
24	MF	NOR	Anwar Elyounoussi
25	FW	NOR	Johan Meldalen Olstad
27	MF	FRA	Rashad Muhammed
31	GK	NOR	Aslak Falch
45	FW	NOR	Jørgen Strand Larsen
69	FW	DEN	Patrick Mortensen
77	MF	ETH	Amin Askar
78	GK	RUS	Aleksandr Vasyutin

== Transfers ==
=== Winter ===
In: Note: Flags indicate national team as defined under FIFA eligibility rules; some limited exceptions apply. Players may hold more than one non-FIFA nationality.

No.	Pos.	Nation	Player
3	MF	NOR	Harmeet Singh (from (Sweden) Kalmar)
4	DF	NOR	Bjørn Inge Utvik (from (Norway) Sogndal)
6	DF	EST	Joonas Tamm (from (Estonia) Flora Tallinn)
14	MF	NGR	Mohammed Usman (from (Portugal) União da Madeira)
15	MF	NOR	Gaute Høberg Vetti (from (Norway) Nest-Sotra)
18	FW	DEN	Mikkel Agger (from (Denmark) Thisted)
19	FW	NOR	Kristoffer Larsen (from (Denmark) Lyngby)
28	FW	NOR	Alexander Ruud Tveter (from (Sweden) Halmstad)
29	FW	DEN	Ronnie Schwartz (from (Belgium) Waasland-Beveren)
30	DF	CRO	Nikola Tkalčić (from (Sweden) IFK Norrköping)
31	GK	NOR	Aslak Falch (from (Sweden) IFK Norrköping)

Out: Note: Flags indicate national team as defined under FIFA eligibility rules; some limited exceptions apply. Players may hold more than one non-FIFA nationality.

No.	Pos.	Nation	Player
1	GK	SRB	Stefan Čupić (to (Serbia) Voždovac)
2	DF	DEN	Andreas Albech (to (Denmark) Vendsyssel)
3	DF	FIN	Henri Toivomäki (to (Finland) KuPS)
5	DF	ISL	Orri Sigurður Ómarsson (on loan to (Norway) HamKam, previously at (Iceland) Valur)
6	MF	DEN	Nicolai Poulsen (loan return to (Denmark) Randers)
9	FW	NGR	Kachi (to (Norway) Sandnes Ulf, previously on loan at (Norway) Strømmen)
10	FW	SWE	Jonas Lindberg (to (Sweden) GAIS)
13	DF	NOR	Ole Heieren Hansen (to (Norway) Kråkerøy)
15	DF	NOR	Sigurd Rosted (to (Belgium) Gent)
18	MF	NOR	Tor Øyvind Hovda (to (Norway) Hønefoss)
19	MF	SEN	Krépin Diatta (to (Belgium) Club Brugge)
23	MF	NOR	Kristoffer Normann Hansen (to (Norway) Ullensaker/Kisa)
24	MF	CPV	Erikson Spinola Lima (to (Norway) Aalesund)
24	FW	NOR	Amani Mbedule (on loan to (Norway) Notodden)
29	DF	NOR	Alexander Groven (to (Norway) Hønefoss)
—	DF	NOR	Leonard Getz (to (Norway) Fredrikstad)
—	MF	NOR	Olav Øby (to (Norway) Kongsvinger, previously on loan at (Norway) Kristiansund)

=== Summer ===
In: Note: Flags indicate national team as defined under FIFA eligibility rules; some limited exceptions apply. Players may hold more than one non-FIFA nationality.

No.	Pos.	Nation	Player
2	DF	NOR	Sulayman Bojang (from (Norway) Skeid)
3	DF	NOR	Jørgen Horn (from (Sweden) Elfsborg)
5	DF	ISL	Orri Sigurður Ómarsson (loan return from (Norway) HamKam)
45	FW	NOR	Jørgen Strand Larsen (loan return from (Italy) Milan Primavera)
78	GK	RUS	Aleksandr Vasyutin (from (Russia) Zenit St.Petersburg)

Out: Note: Flags indicate national team as defined under FIFA eligibility rules; some limited exceptions apply. Players may hold more than one non-FIFA nationality.

No.	Pos.	Nation	Player
20	DF	NOR	Anders Østli (to (Norway) Moss)
21	GK	NOR	Anders Kristiansen (to (Belgium) Union SG)
28	FW	NOR	Alexander Ruud Tveter (on loan to (Norway) Strømmen)
30	DF	CRO	Nikola Tkalčić (on loan to (Norway) Aalesund)

== Competitions ==
=== Eliteserien ===
==== Results summary ====
Overall								Home						Away					
Pld	W	D	L	GF	GA	GD	Pts	W	D	L	GF	GA	GD	W	D	L	GF	GA	GD
30	11	8	11	46	39	+7	41	7	3	5	28	17	+11	4	5	6	18	22	−4

Last updated: 24 November 2018.
Source: see below

==== Results by round ====
Round	1	2	3	4	5	6	7	8	9	10	11	12	13	14	15	16	17	18	19	20	21	22	23	24	25	26	27	28	29	30
Ground	H	A	H	A	H	A	H	H	A	H	A	H	A	H	A	H	A	H	A	H	A	H	A	H	A	A	H	A	H	A
Result	W	D	W	D	L	L	D	D	W	W	W	W	L	L	D	W	W	W	L	L	L	L	L	L	L	D	W	D	D	W
Position	6	5	2	3	7	9	9	9	7	7	4	4	5	7	7	6	5	5	5	6	7	7	8	9	10	9	9	9	9	8

Updated to match(es) played on 24 November 2018. Source: see below
A = Away; H = Home; W = Win; D = Draw; L = Loss

==== Results ====
11 March 2018 1	Sarpsborg 08	1–0	Rosenborg	Sarpsborg
20:00 CET (UTC+1)	Lund Nielsen (yellow card) 14'; Zachariassen 69'; Singh (yellow card) 78'; Schwartz (yellow card) 90'	Report	Konradsen (yellow card) 21'; Hedenstad (yellow card) 77'	Stadium: Sarpsborg Stadion; Attendance: 5,201; Referee: Svein Oddvar Moen

17 March 2018 2	Lillestrøm	2–2	Sarpsborg 08	Lillestrøm
15:30 CEST (UTC+2)	Ødemarksbakken 15'; Mathew (yellow card) 52'; Melgalvis 72'	Report	Tamm 27'; Schwartz 54'; Thomassen (yellow card) 76'	Stadium: Åråsen Stadion; Attendance: 3,842; Referee: Rohit Saggi

2 April 2018 3	Sarpsborg 08	3–0	Vålerenga	Sarpsborg
18:00 CEST (UTC+2)	Mortensen 17', 90+1'; Tamm (yellow card) 47'; Tveita 66'; Schwartz (yellow card) 90'	Report	Johnson (yellow card) 19'; Tollås (yellow card) 61'; Adekugbe (yellow card) 90'	Stadium: Sarpsborg Stadion; Attendance: 6,149; Referee: Kai Erik Steen

8 April 2018 4	Haugesund	1–1	Sarpsborg 08	Haugesund
18:00 CEST (UTC+2)	David 45'; Skjerve (yellow card) 90+4'	Report	Schwartz 50'; Singh (yellow card) 90+2'	Stadium: Haugesund Stadion; Attendance: 3,474; Referee: Espen Eskås

15 April 2018 5	Sarpsborg 08	1–2	Brann	Sarpsborg
20:00 CEST (UTC+2)	Singh 50'; Halvorsen (yellow card) 79'; Schwartz (penalty missed) 87'; Mortensen (yellow card) 90+1'	Report	Nilsen 12' (yellow card) 64'; Wormgoor 80' (pen.) (yellow card) 87'	Stadium: Sarpsborg Stadion; Attendance: 5,258; Referee: Tom Harald Hagen

23 April 2018 6	Odd	3–1	Sarpsborg 08	Skien
19:00 CEST (UTC+2)	Rashani 14', 53' (yellow card) 75'; Broberg 62'	Report	Zachariassen (yellow card) 24'; Ruud 37' (o.g.)	Stadium: Skagerak Arena; Attendance: 4,861; Referee: Espen Eskås

29 April 2018 7	Sarpsborg 08	0–0	Bodø/Glimt	Sarpsborg
18:00 CEST (UTC+2)	Askar (yellow card) 54'; Thomassen (yellow card) 65'; Zachariassen (yellow card) 89'	Report	Isidoro (yellow card) 70'; Opseth (penalty missed) 90+2'	Stadium: Sarpsborg Stadion; Attendance: 4,983; Referee: Sigurd Kringstad

7 May 2018 8	Sarpsborg 08	2–2	Molde	Sarpsborg
19:00 CEST (UTC+2)	Agger 1', 25' (pen.)	Report	Haaland 8'; Forren (yellow card) 24'; Normann 29', (red card) 71'; Sarr (yellow card) 45'	Stadium: Sarpsborg Stadion; Attendance: 4,842; Referee: Ola Hobber Nilsen

13 May 2018 9	Strømsgodset	1–2	Sarpsborg 08	Drammen
18:00 CEST (UTC+2)	Falch 7' (o.g.); Andersen (yellow card) 54'	Report	Halvorsen (yellow card) 29' (goal) 64' (pen.); Muhammed (yellow card) 36'; Schwartz 79'; Askar (yellow card) 90+5'	Stadium: Marienlyst Stadion; Attendance: 5,875; Referee: Dag Vidar Hafsås

16 May 2018 10	Sarpsborg 08	4–0	Start	Sarpsborg
18:00 CEST (UTC+2)	Mortensen 3'; Askar 31', 80'; Nielsen 55'	Report	Larsen (yellow card) 30'; Sigurðarson (yellow card) 55'; Finnbogason (yellow card) 66'; Afeez (yellow card) 90'	Stadium: Sarpsborg Stadion; Attendance: 5,630; Referee: Kai Erik Steen

21 May 2018 11	Sandefjord	0–1	Sarpsborg 08	Sandefjord
18:00 CEST (UTC+2)		Report	Halvorsen 44' (pen.)	Stadium: Komplett Arena; Attendance: 2,850; Referee: Tom Harald Hagen

28 May 2018 12	Sarpsborg 08	4–2	Stabæk	Sarpsborg
19:00 CEST (UTC+2)	Askar 27' (yellow card) 70'; Schwartz 49'; Zachariassen 78'; Mortensen 81'	Report	Boli 1'; Demidov (yellow card) 43'; Omoijuanfo 61'	Stadium: Sarpsborg Stadion; Attendance: 4,658; Referee: Sigurd Kringstad

10 June 2018 13	Ranheim	2–1	Sarpsborg 08	Trondheim
18:00 CEST (UTC+2)	Dønnem (yellow card) 55'; Karlsen (yellow card) 61' (goal) 70' (pen.); Løkberg 89'	Report	Halvorsen 16' (yellow card) 84'; Singh (yellow card) 61'	Stadium: EXTRA Arena; Attendance: 2,039; Referee: Trygve Kjensli

24 June 2018 14	Sarpsborg 08	2–3	Tromsø	Sarpsborg
18:00 CEST (UTC+2)	Agger 9'; Thomassen 67'	Report	Gundersen (yellow card) 10' (goal) 83'; Nilsen 47'; Berntsen (yellow card) 60'; Taylor 88'; Wangberg (yellow card) 90+4'	Stadium: Sarpsborg Stadion; Attendance: 5,240; Referee: Espen Eskås

1 July 2018 15	Kristiansund	1–1	Sarpsborg 08	Kristiansund
18:00 CEST (UTC+2)	Gjertsen (yellow card) 19'; Aasmundsen 21'; Diop (yellow card) 74'; Lepistu (yellow card) 90+1'	Report	Nielsen (yellow card) 33'; Mortensen 80'	Stadium: Kristiansund Stadion; Attendance: 3,982; Referee: Kristoffer Hagenes

8 July 2018 16	Sarpsborg 08	4–1	Ranheim	Sarpsborg
18:00 CEST (UTC+2)	Zachariassen 6'; Askar 34'; Halvorsen 45+3' (pen.), 66' (pen.); Muhammed (yellow card) 62'	Report	Dønnem (yellow card) 38'; Rismark (yellow card) 45+2'; Stamnestrø 57'; Barli (yellow card) 65'	Stadium: Sarpsborg Stadion; Attendance: 4,100; Referee: Rohit Saggi

5 August 2018 17	Stabæk	1–3	Sarpsborg 08	Bærum
18:00 CEST (UTC+2)	Vetlesen 22'; Børkeeiet (yellow card) 43'	Report	Tamm 2'; Mortensen 9'; Larsen 23'; Thomassen (yellow card) 77'; Halvorsen (yellow card) 80'	Stadium: Nadderud Stadion; Attendance: 3,352; Referee: Rohit Saggi

12 August 2018 18	Sarpsborg 08	2–0	Lillestrøm	Sarpsborg
18:00 CEST (UTC+2)	Zachariassen (yellow card) 48' (goal) 73'; Mortensen 60'	Report	Melgalvis (yellow card) 6'; Kippe (yellow card) 32' (yellow-red card) 33'; Smárason (yellow card) 39'	Stadium: Sarpsborg Stadion; Attendance: 4,947; Referee: Tom Harald Hagen

19 August 2018 19	Brann	2–0	Sarpsborg 08	Bergen
18:00 CEST (UTC+2)	Wormgoor 5'; Skålevik 49'	Report		Stadium: Brann Stadion; Attendance: 11,103; Referee: Tommy Skjerven

26 August 2018 20	Sarpsborg 08	1–2	Kristiansund	Sarpsborg
18:00 CEST (UTC+2)	Usman (yellow card) 37'; Schwartz 78'; Vetti (yellow card) 88'	Report	Kastrati (yellow card) 8' (goal) 38'; Kalludra 49'	Stadium: Sarpsborg Stadion; Attendance: 4,773; Referee: Kai Erik Steen

2 September 2018 21	Bodø/Glimt	3–1	Sarpsborg 08	Bodø
18:00 CEST (UTC+2)	Zinckernagel 31'; Opseth 45'; Saltnes 47'	Report	Mortensen 33'; Halvorsen (yellow card) 79'	Stadium: Aspmyra Stadion; Attendance: 3,178; Referee: Ola Hobber Nilsen

16 September 2018 22	Sarpsborg 08	1–2	Odd	Sarpsborg
18:00 CEST (UTC+2)	Horn (yellow card) 10'; Thomassen 48'; Tamm (yellow card) 90+1'	Report	Ruud 14', 52'; Samuelsen (yellow card) 35'	Stadium: Sarpsborg Stadion; Attendance: 4,886; Referee: Sigurd Kringstad

23 September 2018 23	Rosenborg	3–1	Sarpsborg 08	Trondheim
20:00 CEST (UTC+2)	Denić (yellow card) 27'; Levi 66'; Søderlund 74'; De Lanlay 85'	Report	Mortensen 14'; Tamm (yellow card) 41'; Muhammed (yellow card) 71'; Horn (yellow card) 90'	Stadium: Lerkendal Stadion; Attendance: 13,668; Referee: Tore Hansen

30 September 2018 24	Sarpsborg 08	0–1	Strømsgodset	Sarpsborg
18:00 CEST (UTC+2)	Halvorsen (yellow card) 45'	Report	Sætra (yellow card) 15'; Mos 45' (pen.)	Stadium: Sarpsborg Stadion; Attendance: 4,481; Referee: Kristoffer Hagenes

7 October 2018 25	Start	1–0	Sarpsborg 08	Kristiansand
18:00 CEST (UTC+2)	Afeez (yellow card) 72'; Bringaker 88'	Report	Agger (yellow card) 4'; Zachariassen (yellow card) 53'; Vasyutin (yellow card) 88'	Stadium: Sør Arena; Attendance: 3,837; Referee: Trygve Kjensli

20 October 2018 26	Molde	2–2	Sarpsborg 08	Molde
15:30 CEST (UTC+2)	Aursnes 18'; Haaland 76'	Report	Horn 26'; Mortensen 29'; Vasyutin (yellow card) 90+1'	Stadium: Aker Stadion; Attendance: 8,122; Referee: Dag Vidar Hafsås

28 October 2018 27	Sarpsborg 08	2–1	Haugesund	Sarpsborg
18:00 CET (UTC+1)	Heintz 5'; Mortensen 32'; Thomassen (yellow card) 71'	Report	David (yellow card) 53'; Wadji 59' (yellow card) 90+4'; Karamoko (yellow card) 74'	Stadium: Sarpsborg Stadion; Attendance: 4,555; Referee: Espen Eskås

4 November 2018 28	Vålerenga	0–0	Sarpsborg 08	Oslo
18:00 CET (UTC+1)		Report		Stadium: Intility Arena; Attendance: 7,918; Referee: Sigurd Kringstad

11 November 2018 29	Sarpsborg 08	1–1	Sandefjord	Sarpsborg
18:00 CET (UTC+1)	Mortensen 60' (yellow card) 64'; Jørgensen (yellow card) 73'; Horn (yellow card) 77'; Askar (yellow card) 85'	Report	Vales (yellow card) 64'; Vallès 74'	Stadium: Sarpsborg Stadion; Attendance: 5,106; Referee: Trond Ivar Døvle

24 November 2018 30	Tromsø	0–2	Sarpsborg 08	Tromsø
18:00 CET (UTC+1)		Report	Muhammed 6'; Heintz 32' (yellow card) 37'; Horn (yellow card) 49'; Halvorsen (yellow card) 55'	Stadium: Alfheim Stadion; Attendance: 2,998; Referee: Dag Vidar Hafsås

==== Table ====
Pos	Team	Pld	W	D	L	GF	GA	GD	Pts
6	Vålerenga	30	11	9	10	39	44	−5	42
7	Ranheim	30	12	6	12	43	50	−7	42
8	Sarpsborg 08	30	11	8	11	46	39	+7	41
9	Odd	30	11	7	12	39	38	+1	40
10	Tromsø	30	11	3	16	41	48	−7	36

Source: Football Association of Norway (in Norwegian), Soccerway
Rules for classification: 1) Points; 2) Goal difference; 3) Goals scored; 4) Head-to-head points; 5) Head-to-head goal difference; 6) Head-to-head away goals scored (only if between two teams); 7) Head-to-head goals scored; 8) Play-off (only used to decide champions or relegation).

=== Norwegian Cup ===
18 April 2018 First Round	Østsiden	2–9	Sarpsborg 08	Fredrikstad
18:00 CEST (UTC+2)	M.Cham 45' (pen.); M.Pierau (yellow card) 77'; C.Skårn 83'	Report	Muhammed 5'; Tveter 8', 59'; Usman 24'; Larsen 30' (pen.); Heintz 33', 35'; Østli 43'; J.Lunde 75' (o.g.)	Stadium: Østfoldhallen; Attendance: 300; Referee: Ajdin Medic

2 May 2018 Second Round	Ørn-Horten	0–6	Sarpsborg 08	Horten
18:00 CEST (UTC+2)		Report	Schwartz 16', 25' (pen.), 67'; Tveter 34'; Utvik 36'; Heintz (yellow card) 69' (goal) 73'	Stadium: Lystlunden; Attendance: 582; Referee: Sander Magdalon Bråten

10 May 2018 Third Round	HamKam	1–0	Sarpsborg 08	Hamar
18:00 CEST (UTC+2)	Buduson 76'	Report	Jørgensen (yellow card) 78'	Stadium: Briskeby Arena; Attendance: 2,171; Referee: Trond Ivar Døvle

=== Europa League ===
==== Qualifying phase ====
12 July 2018 1st qualifying round 1st leg	ÍBV (Iceland)	0–4	(Norway) Sarpsborg 08	Vestmannaeyjar, Iceland
20:00 CEST (UTC+2)	P.Griffiths (yellow card) 45+9'; S.Magnússon (yellow card) 45+11'; Friðriksson (yellow card) 85'; Zahedi (yellow card) 87'	Report	Halvorsen (yellow card) 45+10' (goal) 90+1'; Muhammed 59'; Mortensen 66'; Askar 90+4'	Stadium: Hásteinsvöllur; Attendance: 673; Referee: Nick Walsh (Scotland)

19 July 2018 1st qualifying round 2nd leg	Sarpsborg 08 (Norway)	2–0 (6–0 agg.)	(Iceland) ÍBV	Sarpsborg, Norway
19:00 CEST (UTC+2)	Agger 13', 82'	Report		Stadium: Sarpsborg Stadion; Attendance: 3,552; Referee: Genc Nuza (Kosovo)

26 July 2018 2nd qualifying round 1st leg	St. Gallen (Switzerland)	2–1	(Norway) Sarpsborg 08	St. Gallen, Switzerland
20:15 CEST (UTC+2)	Vilotić (red card) 4'; Hefti 41'; Buess 66'	Report	Heintz 6'; Zachariassen (yellow card) 32'; Mortensen (yellow card) 90+3'	Stadium: kybunpark Attendance: 6,335; Referee: Fábio Veríssimo (Portugal)

2 August 2018 2nd qualifying round 2nd leg	Sarpsborg 08 (Norway)	1–0 (a2–2 agg.)	(Switzerland) St. Gallen	Sarpsborg, Norway
20:45 CEST (UTC+2)	Mortensen 31'; Tamm (yellow card) 35'; Halvorsen (yellow card) 57'	Report	Buess (yellow card) 4'; Ashimeru (yellow card) 70'; Lüchinger (yellow card) 78'	Stadium: Sarpsborg Stadion; Attendance: 5,460; Referee: Frank Schneider (France)

9 August 2018 3rd qualifying round 1st leg	Sarpsborg 08 (Norway)	1–1	(Croatia) Rijeka	Sarpsborg, Norway
20:45 CEST (UTC+2)	Thomassen (yellow card) 59'; Tamm (yellow card) 69'; Zachariassen 72'; Askar (yellow card) 74'	Report	Héber (yellow card) 60'; Gorgon 83'; Čanađija (yellow card) 89'	Stadium: Sarpsborg Stadion; Attendance: 5,944; Referee: Kevin Clancy (Scotland)

16 August 2018 3rd qualifying round 2nd leg	Rijeka (Croatia)	0–1 (1–2 agg.)	(Norway) Sarpsborg 08	Rijeka, Croatia
20:45 CEST (UTC+2)	Zuta (yellow card) 75'	Report	Halvorsen (yellow card) 69'; Mortensen 83'; Muhammed (yellow card) 88'; Heintz (yellow card) 90+5'	Stadium: Stadion Rujevica; Attendance: 5,351; Referee: Donatas Rumšas (Lithuania)

23 August 2018 Playoff round 1st leg	Sarpsborg 08 (Norway)	3–1	(Israel) Maccabi Tel Aviv	Sarpsborg, Norway
19:05 CEST (UTC+2)	Heintz 2'; Lund Nielsen 7' (pen.); Tamm (yellow card) 12'; Jørgensen (yellow card) 40'; Mortensen 56' (pen.)	Report	Tibi (yellow card) 6'; Kjartansson 13' (pen.); Rajković (yellow card) 54'	Stadium: Sarpsborg Stadion; Attendance: 6,363; Referee: Vladislav Bezborodov (Russia)

30 August 2018 Playoff round 2nd leg	Maccabi Tel Aviv (Israel)	2–1 (3–4 agg.)	(Norway) Sarpsborg 08	Netanya, Israel
19:00 CEST (UTC+2)	Atzili (yellow card) 30' (goal) 52' (pen.); Atar 60'; Shechter (yellow card) 90+1'	Report	Muhammed (yellow card) 45+1'; Utvik (yellow card) 52'; Halvorsen 81' (pen.) (yellow card) 82'; Askar (yellow card) 84'	Stadium: Netanya Stadium; Attendance: 10,673; Referee: Artur Soares Dias (Portugal)
Note: Maccabi Tel Aviv played their home matches at Netanya Stadium, Netanya, instead of their regular stadium Bloomfield Stadium, Tel Aviv, due to renovation.

==== Group stage ====
Pos	Team	Pld	W	D	L	GF	GA	GD	Pts	Qualification
1	(Belgium) Genk	6	3	2	1	14	8	+6	11	Advance to knockout phase
2	(Sweden) Malmö FF	6	2	3	1	7	6	+1	9	Advance to knockout phase
3	(Turkey) Beşiktaş	6	2	1	3	9	11	−2	7	
4	(Norway) Sarpsborg 08	6	1	2	3	8	13	−5	5	

Source: UEFA
Rules for classification: Group stage tiebreakers

20 September 2018 1	Beşiktaş (Turkey)	3–1	(Norway) Sarpsborg 08	Istanbul, Turkey
18:55 CEST (UTC+2)	Medel (yellow card) 20'; Babel 51'; Roco 69' (yellow card) 90+3'; Lens 82'	Report	Askar (yellow card) 37'; Zachariassen 90+4'	Stadium: Vodafone Park; Attendance: 24,955; Referee: Tamás Bognár (Hungary)

4 October 2018 2	Sarpsborg 08 (Norway)	3–1	(Belgium) Genk	Sarpsborg, Norway
21:00 CEST (UTC+2)	Mortensen 6', 63' (yellow card) 18'; Zachariassen 54'	Report	Trossard 49'; Pozuelo (yellow card) 67'	Stadium: Sarpsborg Stadion; Attendance: 7,885; Referee: Ivan Bebek (Croatia)

25 October 2018 3	Sarpsborg 08 (Norway)	1–1	(Sweden) Malmö FF	Sarpsborg, Norway
22:00 CEST (UTC+2)	Tamm (yellow card) 31'; Halvorsen 87'	Report	Vindheim (yellow card) 47' (goal) 79'; Rosenberg (yellow card) 76'	Stadium: Sarpsborg Stadion; Attendance: 8,022; Referee: Paweł Raczkowski (Poland)

8 November 2018 4	Malmö FF (Sweden)	1–1	(Norway) Sarpsborg 08	Malmö, Sweden
18:55 CET (UTC+1)	Rieks (yellow card) 62'; Antonsson 67'; Larsson (yellow card) 73'	Report	Askar (yellow card) 40'; Horn (yellow card) 43'; Muhammed (yellow card) 45'; Thomassen (yellow card) 48'; Mortensen 63'; Tamm (yellow card) 76'	Stadium: Stadion; Attendance: 17,601; Referee: Miroslav Zelinka (Czech Republic)

29 November 2018 5	Sarpsborg 08 (Norway)	2–3	(Turkey) Beşiktaş	Sarpsborg, Norway
21:00 CET (UTC+1)	Muhammed 1'; Heintz 6'	Report	Ljajić (yellow card) 55'; Lens 62', 90'; Vágner Love 66'; Aksoy (yellow card) 79'; Özyakup (yellow card) 80'	Stadium: Sarpsborg Stadion; Attendance: 8,022; Referee: Harald Lechner (Austria)

13 December 2018 6	Genk (Belgium)	4–0	(Norway) Sarpsborg 08	Genk, Belgium
18:55 CET (UTC+1)	Gano 3'; Paintsil 5'; Uronen (yellow card) 28'; Berge 64'; Aidoo 67'	Report		Stadium: Luminus Arena; Attendance: 12,240; Referee: István Kovács (Romania)

== Squad statistics ==
As of match played 20 September 2018

=== Appearances and goals ===
No.	Pos	Nat	Player	Total		Eliteserien		Norwegian Cup		Europa League	
No.	Pos	Nat	Player	Apps	Goals	Apps	Goals	Apps	Goals	Apps	Goals
2	DF	(Norway) NOR	Sulayman Bojang	1	0	1	0	0	0	0	0
3	DF	(Norway) NOR	Jørgen Horn	10	1	7+1	1	0	0	1+1	0
4	DF	(Norway) NOR	Bjørn Inge Utvik	15	1	7+2	0	3	1	2+1	0
5	DF	(Iceland) ISL	Orri Sigurður Ómarsson	2	0	0+2	0	0	0	0	0
6	DF	(Estonia) EST	Joonas Tamm	32	2	22+3	2	0	0	7	0
7	MF	(Norway) NOR	Ole Jørgen Halvorsen	32	6	23+1	5	0	0	7+1	1
8	MF	(Denmark) DEN	Matti Lund Nielsen	37	3	25+3	1	0+1	0	8	2
10	MF	(Norway) NOR	Tobias Heintz	34	7	13+10	2	3	3	5+3	2
11	DF	(Norway) NOR	Joackim Jørgensen	33	1	24	1	1	0	8	0
14	MF	(Nigeria) NGR	Mohammed Usman	11	1	1+5	0	3	1	1+1	0
15	MF	(Norway) NOR	Gaute Høberg Vetti	10	0	2+5	0	1+1	0	0+1	0
16	DF	(Norway) NOR	Joachim Thomassen	36	2	27	2	1	0	8	0
17	MF	(Norway) NOR	Kristoffer Zachariassen	37	6	25+1	4	2	0	9	2
18	FW	(Denmark) DEN	Mikkel Agger	25	5	10+12	3	0+1	0	1+1	2
19	MF	(Norway) NOR	Kristoffer Larsen	24	2	4+12	1	3	1	1+4	0
22	MF	(Norway) NOR	Jon-Helge Tveita	33	1	23+2	1	0+1	0	7	0
23	MF	(Norway) NOR	Harmeet Singh	35	1	18+10	1	0	0	0+7	0
27	MF	(France) FRA	Rashad Muhammed	25	3	9+4	1	1+2	1	8+1	1
31	GK	(Norway) NOR	Aslak Falch	21	0	18	0	0	0	3	0
45	FW	(Norway) NOR	Jørgen Strand Larsen	9	0	2+4	0	0	0	0+3	0
69	FW	(Denmark) DEN	Patrick Mortensen	38	16	28	12	0+1	0	9	4
77	MF	(Ethiopia) ETH	Amin Askar	34	5	23+1	4	2	0	8	1
78	GK	(Russia) RUS	Aleksandr Vasyutin	18	0	12	0	0	0	6	0
Players away from Sarpsborg 08 on loan:
24	FW	(Norway) NOR	Amani Mbedule	1	0	0	0	0+1	0	0	0
28	FW	(Norway) NOR	Alexander Ruud Tveter	3	3	0	0	3	3	0	0
30	DF	(Croatia) CRO	Nikola Tkalčić	3	0	0	0	3	0	0	0
Players who left Sarpsborg 08 during the season:
20	DF	(Norway) NOR	Anders Østli	2	1	0	0	2	1	0	0
21	GK	(Norway) NOR	Anders Kristiansen	3	0	0	0	3	0	0	0
29	FW	(Denmark) DEN	Ronnie Schwartz	16	8	6+8	5	2	3	0	0

=== Goal scorers ===
Place	Position	Nation	Number	Name	Eliteserien	Norwegian Cup	Europa League	Total
1	FW	(Denmark)	69	Patrick Mortensen	12	0	4	16
2	FW	(Denmark)	29	Ronnie Schwartz	5	3	0	8
3	MF	(Norway)	7	Ole Jørgen Halvorsen	5	0	2	7
3	MF	(Norway)	10	Tobias Heintz	2	3	2	7
5	MF	(Norway)	17	Kristoffer Zachariassen	4	0	2	6
6	MF	(Ethiopia)	77	Amin Askar	4	0	1	5
6	FW	(Denmark)	18	Mikkel Agger	3	0	2	5
8	FW	(Norway)	28	Alexander Ruud Tveter	0	3	0	3
8	MF	(France)	27	Rashad Muhammed	1	1	1	3
10	DF	(Estonia)	6	Joonas Tamm	2	0	0	2
10	DF	(Norway)	16	Joachim Thomassen	2	0	0	2
10	MF	(Norway)	19	Kristoffer Larsen	1	1	0	2
10	MF	(Denmark)	8	Matti Lund Nielsen	1	0	1	2
10				Own goal	1	1	0	2
16	MF	(Norway)	22	Jon-Helge Tveita	1	0	0	1
16	MF	(Norway)	23	Harmeet Singh	1	0	0	1
16	DF	(Norway)	3	Jørgen Horn	1	0	0	1
16	MF	(Nigeria)	14	Mohammed Usman	0	1	0	1
16	DF	(Norway)	20	Anders Østli	0	1	0	1
16	DF	(Norway)	4	Bjørn Inge Utvik	0	1	0	1
				TOTALS	46	15	15	76

=== Disciplinary record ===
Number	Nation	Position	Name	Eliteserien		Norwegian Cup		Europa League		Total	
Number	Nation	Position	Name	Yellow card	Red card	Yellow card	Red card	Yellow card	Red card	Yellow card	Red card
3	(Norway)	DF	Jørgen Horn	4	0	0	0	0	0	4	0
4	(Norway)	DF	Bjørn Inge Utvik	0	0	0	0	1	0	1	0
6	(Estonia)	DF	Joonas Tamm	3	0	0	0	3	0	6	0
7	(Norway)	MF	Ole Jørgen Halvorsen	7	0	0	0	4	0	11	0
8	(Denmark)	MF	Matti Lund Nielsen	2	0	0	0	0	0	2	0
10	(Norway)	MF	Tobias Heintz	1	0	1	0	1	0	3	0
11	(Norway)	DF	Joackim Jørgensen	1	0	1	0	1	0	3	0
14	(Nigeria)	MF	Mohammed Usman	1	0	0	0	1	0	2	0
15	(Norway)	MF	Gaute Høberg Vetti	1	0	0	0	1	0	2	0
16	(Norway)	MF	Joachim Thomassen	4	0	0	0	2	0	6	0
17	(Norway)	MF	Kristoffer Zachariassen	4	0	0	0	1	0	5	0
18	(Denmark)	FW	Mikkel Agger	1	0	0	0	0	0	1	0
22	(Norway)	MF	Jon-Helge Tveita	1	0	0	0	0	0	1	0
23	(Norway)	MF	Harmeet Singh	3	0	0	0	0	0	3	0
27	(France)	MF	Rashad Muhammed	3	0	0	0	2	0	5	0
69	(Denmark)	FW	Patrick Mortensen	2	0	0	0	1	0	3	0
77	(Ethiopia)	MF	Amin Askar	4	0	0	0	3	0	7	0
78	(Russia)	GK	Aleksandr Vasyutin	2	0	0	0	0	0	2	0
Players away from Sarpsborg 08 on loan:
Players who left Sarpsborg 08 during the season:
29	(Denmark)	FW	Ronnie Schwartz	2	0	0	0	0	0	1	0
			TOTALS	46	0	2	0	19	0	67	0
