= 2017 Sarpsborg 08 FF season =

Sarpsborg 08
2017 season
- Chairman: Hans Petter Arnesen
- Manager: Geir Bakke
- Stadium: Sarpsborg Stadion
- Eliteserien: 3rd
- Norwegian Cup: Final
- Top goalscorer: League: Patrick Mortensen (12); All: Patrick Mortensen (14)
Home colours	Away colours	Third colours

The 2017 season is Sarpsborg 08's 6th season in Tippeligaen, following their return to the top level in 2012. It is also their third season with Geir Bakke as the club's manager.

== Squad ==
As of 14 August 2017

Note: Flags indicate national team as defined under FIFA eligibility rules; some limited exceptions apply. Players may hold more than one non-FIFA nationality.

No.	Pos.	Nation	Player
1	GK	SRB	Stefan Čupić
2	DF	DEN	Andreas Albech
3	DF	FIN	Henri Toivomäki
6	MF	DEN	Nicolai Poulsen (on loan from Randers)
7	MF	NOR	Ole Jørgen Halvorsen
8	MF	DEN	Matti Lund Nielsen
10	FW	SWE	Jonas Lindberg
11	DF	NOR	Joackim Jørgensen
13	DF	NOR	Ole Hansen (captain)
14	MF	NOR	Tobias Heintz
15	DF	NOR	Sigurd Rosted
16	DF	NOR	Joachim Thomassen
17	MF	NOR	Kristoffer Zachariassen

No.	Pos.	Nation	Player
18	MF	NOR	Tor Øyvind Hovda
19	MF	SEN	Krépin Diatta
20	DF	NOR	Anders Østli
21	GK	NOR	Anders Kristiansen
22	MF	NOR	Jon-Helge Tveita
23	MF	NOR	Kristoffer Normann Hansen
24	MF	CPV	Nenass
27	FW	FRA	Rashad Muhammed
29	DF	NOR	Alexander Groven
45	FW	NOR	Jørgen Strand Larsen
69	FW	DEN	Patrick Mortensen
77	MF	ETH	Amin Askar

=== Out on loan ===
Note: Flags indicate national team as defined under FIFA eligibility rules; some limited exceptions apply. Players may hold more than one non-FIFA nationality.

No.	Pos.	Nation	Player
8	FW	NGR	Kachi (at Strømmen)
24	FW	NOR	Amani Mbedule (at Notodden)
—	MF	NOR	Olav Øby (at Kristiansund)

== Transfers ==
=== Winter ===
In: Note: Flags indicate national team as defined under FIFA eligibility rules; some limited exceptions apply. Players may hold more than one non-FIFA nationality.

No.	Pos.	Nation	Player
1	GK	SRB	Stefan Čupić (from (Serbia) OFK Beograd)
2	DF	DEN	Andreas Albech (from (Iceland) Valur)
7	MF	NOR	Ole Jørgen Halvorsen (from (Norway) Odd, previously on loan at (Norway) Bodø/Glimt)
11	MF	NOR	Joackim Jørgensen (from (Norway) Viking)
17	MF	NOR	Kristoffer Zachariassen (from (Norway) Nest-Sotra)
19	MF	SEN	Krépin Diatta (from (Senegal) Oslo Football Academy)
44	FW	KOS	Erton Fejzullahu (from (China) Dalian Transcendence)

Out: Note: Flags indicate national team as defined under FIFA eligibility rules; some limited exceptions apply. Players may hold more than one non-FIFA nationality.

No.	Pos.	Nation	Player
1	GK	NOR	Arild Østbø (to (Norway) Rosenborg)
2	FW	NOR	Brice Wembangomo (to (Norway) Jerv, previously on loan at (Norway) Fredrikstad)
7	FW	NOR	Pål Alexander Kirkevold (loan return to (Denmark) Hobro)
8	FW	NGR	Kachi (on loan to (Norway) Bodø/Glimt)
17	MF	DEN	Steffen Ernemann (to (Norway) Viking)
19	DF	ISL	Kristinn Jónsson (to (Norway) Sogndal)

=== Summer ===
In: Note: Flags indicate national team as defined under FIFA eligibility rules; some limited exceptions apply. Players may hold more than one non-FIFA nationality.

No.	Pos.	Nation	Player
6	MF	DEN	Nicolai Poulsen (on loan from (Denmark) Randers)
24	MF	CPV	Nenass (from (Norway) KFUM Oslo)
27	FW	FRA	Rashad Muhammed (from (Norway) Florø)
77	MF	ETH	Amin Askar (from (Turkey) Şanlıurfaspor)

Out: Note: Flags indicate national team as defined under FIFA eligibility rules; some limited exceptions apply. Players may hold more than one non-FIFA nationality.

No.	Pos.	Nation	Player
4	DF	NOR	Morten Sundli (to (Sweden) Östers)
6	MF	NOR	Anders Trondsen (to (Norway) Rosenborg)
9	FW	NGR	Kachi (on loan to (Norway) Strømmen, previously on loan at (Norway) Bodø/Glimt)
24	FW	NOR	Amani Mbedule (on loan to (Norway) Notodden, previously on loan at (Norway) Hødd)
44	FW	KOS	Erton Fejzullahu (to (Sweden) Kalmar)
—	MF	NOR	Olav Øby (on loan to (Norway) Kristiansund, previously on loan at (Norway) Strømmen)

== Competitions ==
=== Eliteserien ===
==== Results summary ====
Overall								Home						Away					
Pld	W	D	L	GF	GA	GD	Pts	W	D	L	GF	GA	GD	W	D	L	GF	GA	GD
30	13	12	5	50	36	+14	51	9	5	1	32	13	+19	4	7	4	18	23	−5

Last updated: 26 November 2017.
Source: see below

==== Results by round ====
Round	1	2	3	4	5	6	7	8	9	10	11	12	13	14	15	16	17	18	19	20	21	22	23	24	25	26	27	28	29	30
Ground	H	A	H	A	H	H	A	H	A	H	A	H	A	H	A	H	A	H	A	H	A	A	H	A	H	A	H	A	H	A
Result	W	W	W	L	W	L	D	D	W	W	D	W	L	D	D	D	W	W	D	D	W	L	W	D	D	D	W	L	W	D
Position	2	2	1	4	2	2	2	4	4	3	3	2	3	3	3	3	2	2	2	2	2	3	2	2	3	3	3	3	3	3

Updated to match(es) played on 26 November 2017. Source: see below
A = Away; H = Home; W = Win; D = Draw; L = Loss

==== Results ====
2 April 2017 1	Sarpsborg 08	3–1	Sogndal	Sarpsborg
15:30 CEST (UTC+2)	Rosted 30', 65'; Jørgensen (yellow card) 50'; Zachariassen 55'	Summary	Ramsland 14'	Stadium: Sarpsborg Stadion; Attendance: 4,302; Referee: Espen Eskås

5 April 2017 2	Aalesund	1–3	Sarpsborg 08	Ålesund
19:00 CEST (UTC+2)	Carlsen 19'; Hoff (yellow card) 85'	Summary	Mortensen 9', 21'; Nielsen (yellow card) 32'; Jørgensen 45+1'; Albech (yellow card) 51'	Stadium: Color Line Stadion; Attendance: 5,363; Referee: Trygve Kjensli

9 April 2017 3	Sarpsborg 08	3–0	Viking	Sarpsborg
18:00 CEST (UTC+2)	Trondsen 2'; Østli 56'; Mortensen 68'	Summary	Shroot (yellow card) 19'; Mets (yellow card) 77'	Stadium: Sarpsborg Stadion; Attendance: 4,230; Referee: Ola Hobber Nilsen

17 April 2017 4	Stabæk	3–0	Sarpsborg 08	Bærum
18:00 CEST (UTC+2)	Omoijuanfo 32' (pen.), 73', 87'	Summary	Rosted (red card) 31'; Thomassen (yellow card) 43'; Halvorsen (yellow card) 45'	Stadium: Nadderud Stadion; Attendance: 3,870; Referee: Tore Hansen

23 April 2017 5	Sarpsborg 08	5–1	Kristiansund	Sarpsborg
18:00 CEST (UTC+2)	Mortensen 14'; Lindberg 33'; Thomassen (yellow card) 50'; Nielsen 63', 76'; Fejzullahu 82'	Summary	Baranov (yellow card) 6'; Qaka (yellow card) 17'; Jørgensen 47' (o.g.); Sørli (yellow card) 62'	Stadium: Sarpsborg Stadion; Attendance: 4,121; Referee: Martin Lundby

1 May 2017 6	Sarpsborg 08	1–2	Rosenborg	Sarpsborg
19:00 CEST (UTC+2)	Zachariassen (yellow card) 75'; Thomassen 79'	Report	Bendtner 9'; Bakenga 80'; Jevtović (red card) 82'	Stadium: Sarpsborg Stadion; Attendance: 5,759; Referee: Svein Oddvar Moen

7 May 2017 7	Strømsgodset	1–1	Sarpsborg 08	Drammen
18:00 CEST (UTC+2)	Andersen 45+1'	Report	Nielsen 30' (yellow card) 45'; Rosted (yellow card) 42'	Stadium: Marienlyst Stadion; Referee: Trygve Kjensli

13 May 2017 8	Sarpsborg 08	1–1	Tromsø	Sarpsborg
18:00 CEST (UTC+2)	Halvorsen (yellow card) 16'; Albech (yellow card) 19' (yellow-red card) 88'; Fejzullahu 72'	Report	Olsen (yellow card) 45' (goal) 48'	Stadium: Sarpsborg Stadion; Attendance: 4,395; Referee: Rohit Saggi

16 May 2017 9	Lillestrøm	1–2	Sarpsborg 08	Lillestrøm
18:00 CEST (UTC+2)	Origi (yellow card) 45'; Mikalsen 90+3'	Report	Zachariassen 39'; Mortensen 76'	Stadium: Åråsen Stadion; Attendance: 5,421; Referee: Martin Lundby

21 May 2017 10	Sarpsborg 08	2–0	Vålerenga	Sarpsborg
18:00 CEST (UTC+2)	Rosted 4'; Thomassen (yellow card) 31'; Trondsen 38'; Halvorsen (yellow card) 50'	Report	Lundström (yellow card) 30'; Ibrahim (yellow card) 32'	Stadium: Sarpsborg Stadion; Attendance: 5,301; Referee: Kristoffer Hagenes

28 May 2017 11	Haugesund	0–0	Sarpsborg 08	Haugesund
18:00 CEST (UTC+2)	Kiss (yellow card) 50'	Report	Trondsen (yellow card) 79'	Stadium: Haugesund Stadion; Attendance: 4,004; Referee: Trygve Kjensli

4 June 2017 12	Sarpsborg 08	1–0	Molde	Sarpsborg
18:00 CEST (UTC+2)	Mortensen 62'; Trondsen (yellow card) 64'	Report	Hussain (yellow card) 40'; Haaland (yellow card) 72'; Gregersen 90+1'	Stadium: Sarpsborg Stadion; Attendance: 4,648; Referee: Espen Eskås

18 June 2017 13	Sandefjord	1–0	Sarpsborg 08	Sandefjord
18:00 CEST (UTC+2)	Seck 43'; Olsen (yellow card) 76'	Report	Zachariassen (yellow card) 54'	Stadium: Komplett Arena; Attendance: 3,893; Referee: Espen Eskås

25 June 2017 14	Sarpsborg 08	1–1	Brann	Sarpsborg
18:00 CEST (UTC+2)	Zachariassen 22'	Report	Haugen (yellow card) 35'; Vega (yellow card) 67'; Wormgoor 73'; Nouri (yellow card) 85'	Stadium: Sarpsborg Stadion; Attendance: 5,759; Referee: Tommy Skjerven

2 July 2017 15	Odd	0–0	Sarpsborg 08	Skien
18:00 CEST (UTC+2)	Riski (yellow card) 25'	Report	Thomassen (yellow card) 16'; Lindberg (yellow card) 37'	Stadium: Skagerak Arena; Attendance: 7,201; Referee: Tore Hansen

10 July 2017 16	Sarpsborg 08	3–3	Lillestrøm	Sarpsborg
19:00 CEST (UTC+2)	Heintz 13', 42'; Nielsen (yellow card) 59'; Fejzullahu (yellow card) 72'; Mortensen 73'; Groven (yellow card) 76'	Report	Udoji 12'; Amundsen (yellow card) 26' (yellow-red card) 54'; Knudtzon 60'; Rafn (yellow card) 86'; Andreassen 88' (pen.)	Stadium: Sarpsborg Stadion; Attendance: 4,843; Referee: Trygve Kjensli

16 July 2017 17	Brann	0–1	Sarpsborg 08	Bergen
20:00 CEST (UTC+2)	Børven (yellow card) 31'; Acosta (yellow card) 39'	Report	Albech (yellow card) 20' (yellow-red card) 88'; Trondsen (yellow card) 62'; Mortensen 90+3'	Stadium: Brann Stadion; Attendance: 10,721; Referee: Trond Ivar Døvle

6 August 2017 18	Sarpsborg 08	2–1	Haugesund	Sarpsborg
18:00 CEST (UTC+2)	Ćosić 63' (o.g.); Halvorsen 90+4'	Report	Ćosić (yellow card) 1'; Rosted (yellow card) 32'	Stadium: Sarpsborg Stadion; Attendance: 4,396; Referee: Ola Hobber Nilsen

13 August 2017 19	Kristiansund	2–2	Sarpsborg 08	Kristiansund
18:00 CEST (UTC+2)	Rønningen 35'; Bjerkås (yellow card) 90'; Mendy 90+4'	Report	Rosted (yellow card) 34'; Mortensen 61'; Albech (yellow card) 70'; Diatta 80'	Stadium: Atlanten Stadion; Attendance: 3,498; Referee: Rohit Saggi

21 August 2017 20	Sarpsborg 08	0–0	Strømsgodset	Sarpsborg
19:00 CEST (UTC+2)	Zachariassen (yellow card) 64'; Thomassen (yellow card) 82'; Askar (yellow card) 83'	Report	Pedersen (yellow card) 34'; Madsen (yellow card) 57'; Glesnes (yellow card) 72'; Tokstad (yellow card) 82'	Stadium: Sarpsborg Stadion; Attendance: 4,378; Referee: Martin Lundby

10 September 2017 21	Vålerenga	1–2	Sarpsborg 08	Oslo
18:00 CEST (UTC+2)	Lundström (yellow card) 47'; Lekven 90+2'	Report	Halvorsen 21'; Diatta 57'; Askar (yellow card) 59'	Stadium: Valle Hovin; Attendance: 17,011; Referee: Svein Oddvar Moen

17 September 2017 22	Tromsø	5–0	Sarpsborg 08	Tromsø
18:00 CEST (UTC+2)	Wangberg 13', 41'; Landu Landu 16'; Bakenga 26'; Ingebrigtsen 59'; Ødegaard (yellow card) 90+2'	Report	Albech (yellow card) 80'; Hovda (yellow card) 87'	Stadium: Alfheim Stadion; Attendance: 3,116; Referee: Dag Vidar Hafsås

25 September 2017 23	Sarpsborg 08	2–1	Odd	Sarpsborg
19:00 CEST (UTC+2)	Halvorsen 31' (pen.); Zachariassen 48' (yellow card) 82'	Report	Samuelsen (yellow card) 45+1'; Rashani 53'	Stadium: Sarpsborg Stadion; Attendance: 4,365; Referee: Rohit Saggi

1 October 2017 24	Rosenborg	1–1	Sarpsborg 08	Trondheim
20:00 CEST (UTC+2)	Rosted 56' (o.g.)	Report	Rosted 65'; Halvorsen (yellow card) 68'; Rosted (yellow card) 90'	Stadium: Lerkendal Stadion; Attendance: 15,801; Referee: Svein Oddvar Moen

16 October 2017 25	Sarpsborg 08	2–2	Stabæk	Sarpsborg
19:00 CEST (UTC+2)	Heintz 1'; Zachariassen 12'; Østli (yellow card) 34'; Nielsen (yellow card) 66'; Thomassen (yellow card) 82'; Hansen (yellow card) 90'	Report	Hernández (yellow card) 24'; Njie 27'; Skjønsberg 87'	Stadium: Sarpsborg Stadion; Attendance: 4,455; Referee: Kai Erik Steen

22 October 2017 27	Sogndal	3–3	Sarpsborg 08	Sogndalsfjøra
18:00 CEST (UTC+2)	Wæhler 21'; Greenidge (yellow card) 24'; Koomson 26'; Rindarøy 39'; Birkelund (yellow card) 67'; Hovland (yellow card) 78'; Ramsland (yellow card) 84'	Report	Diatta 4' (yellow card) 41'; Nielsen 54', 88'	Stadium: Fosshaugane Campus; Attendance: 2,504; Referee: Trygve Kjensli

29 October 2017 27	Sarpsborg 08	5–0	Sandefjord	Sarpsborg
18:00 CEST (UTC+2)	Jørgensen 3', 48'; Halvorsen (yellow card) 12' (goal) 64'; Zachariassen 32', 39'; Askar (yellow card) 76'	Report	Reppesgård (yellow card) 15'; Bindia (yellow card) 41'; Olsen (yellow card) 45+2'	Stadium: Sarpsborg Stadion; Attendance: 4,797; Referee: Tommy Skjerven

5 November 2017 28	Viking	2–1	Sarpsborg 08	Stavanger
18:00 CET (UTC+1)	Green 22' (yellow card) 54'; Bytyqi (yellow card) 68'; Torsteinbø 88'; Ryerson (yellow card) 90+1'	Report	Mortensen 17'; Poulsen (yellow card) 90+2'	Stadium: Viking Stadion; Attendance: 7,467; Referee: Kai Erik Steen

19 November 2017 29	Sarpsborg 08	1–0	Aalesund	Sarpsborg
18:00 CEST (UTC+2)	Mortensen 48'; Jørgensen (yellow card) 63'	Report	O.Lie (yellow card) 45+1'; Ramsteijn (yellow card) 60' (yellow-red card) 70'	Stadium: Sarpsborg Stadion; Attendance: 4,600; Referee: Martin Lundby

26 November 2017 30	Molde	2–2	Sarpsborg 08	Molde
18:00 CEST (UTC+2)	Sigurðarson 61', 74'; Gregersen (yellow card) 83'; Haaland (yellow card) 86'	Report	Mortensen 50'; Zachariassen 55' (yellow card) 66'	Stadium: Aker Stadion; Attendance: 7,419; Referee: Espen Eskås

==== Table ====
Pos	Team	Pld	W	D	L	GF	GA	GD	Pts	Qualification or relegation
1	Rosenborg (C)	30	18	7	5	57	20	+37	61	Qualification for the Champions League first qualifying round
2	Molde	30	16	6	8	50	35	+15	54	Qualification for the Europa League first qualifying round
3	Sarpsborg 08	30	13	12	5	50	36	+14	51	Qualification for the Europa League first qualifying round
4	Strømsgodset	30	14	8	8	45	37	+8	50	
5	Brann	30	13	8	9	51	36	+15	47	

Source: Football Association of Norway (in Norwegian), Soccerway
Rules for classification: 1) Points; 2) Goal difference; 3) Goals scored; 4) Head-to-head points; 5) Head-to-head goal difference; 6) Head-to-head away goals scored (only if between two teams); 7) Head-to-head goals scored; 8) Play-off (only used to decide champions or relegation).
(C) Champions

=== Norwegian Cup ===
26 April 2017 First Round	Drøbak-Frogn	1–10	Sarpsborg 08	Drøbak
18:00 CEST (UTC+2)	Camara (yellow card) 61'; Vågan 62'	Report	Fejzullahu 3', 11', 19'; Diatta 21', 30', 86'; Trondsen 23'; Rosted (yellow card) 35'; Larsen 45', 78', 90+2'	Stadium: Seiersten stadion Attendance: 420; Referee: Torkel Jonsson Traedal

24 May 2017 Second Round	Moss	1–3	Sarpsborg 08	Moss
18:00 CEST (UTC+2)	M.Ohlsson (yellow card) 30'; T.Reinback 35'; Y.Chaib (red card) 76'	Report	Heintz 28'; Mortensen 67'; Zachariassen (yellow card) 87'; Fejzullahu 90+3'	Stadium: Melløs Stadion; Attendance: 1,212; Referee: Christian Moen

31 May 2017 Third Round	Kongsvinger	0–4	Sarpsborg 08	Kongsvinger
18:30 CEST (UTC+2)	F.Sjølstad (yellow card) 46'	Report	Mortensen 14'; Nielsen 43'; Albech (yellow card) 55'; Halvorsen 63'; Zachariassen 66'	Stadium: Gjemselund Stadion; Attendance: 1,003; Referee: Bjørn Hansen

9 August 2017 Fourth Round	Sarpsborg 08	4–0	Odd	Sarpsborg
18:30 CEST (UTC+2)	Rossbach 38', 41' (o.g.); Diatta 47'; Trondsen 52'	Report		Stadium: Sarpsborg Stadion; Attendance: 2,650; Referee: Espen Eskås

26 August 2017 Quarterfinal	Mjøndalen	1–2	Sarpsborg 08	Mjøndalen
16:00 CEST (UTC+2)	Jansen 33'; Arneberg (yellow card) 81'	Report	Zachariassen 66'; Heintz 85'; Mortensen (yellow card) 90+4'	Stadium: Isachsen Stadion; Attendance: 2,244; Referee: Espen Eskås

20 September 2017 Semifinal	Vålerenga	0–3	Sarpsborg 08	Oslo
20:15 CEST (UTC+2)	Johansen (yellow card) 82'; Stengel (yellow card) 90+2'	Report	Diatta 25' (yellow card) 29'; Halvorsen 59', 90' (pen.)	Stadium: Valle Hovin; Attendance: 8,302; Referee: Tore Hansen

==== Final ====
3 December 2017	Lillestrøm	3–2	Sarpsborg 08	Oslo
13:15 CET (UTC+1)	Mikalsen 2'; Haakenstad 12'; Kippe 59'; Marić (yellow card) 60'; Udoji (yellow card) 89'	Report	Mortensen 24'; Kippe 64' (o.g.); Jørgensen (yellow card) 68'	Stadium: Ullevaal Stadion; Attendance: 25,091; Referee: Ola Hobber Nilsen

== Squad statistics ==
As of match played 3 December 2017

=== Appearances and goals ===
No.	Pos	Nat	Player	Total		Eliteserien		Norwegian Cup	
No.	Pos	Nat	Player	Apps	Goals	Apps	Goals	Apps	Goals
1	GK	(Serbia) SRB	Stefan Čupić	5	0	0	0	5	0
2	DF	(Denmark) DEN	Andreas Albech	18	0	12+1	0	4+1	0
3	DF	(Finland) FIN	Henri Toivomäki	4	0	3+1	0	0	0
6	MF	(Denmark) DEN	Nicolai Poulsen	11	0	7+1	0	1+2	0
7	MF	(Norway) NOR	Ole Jørgen Halvorsen	31	7	22+4	4	5	3
8	MF	(Denmark) DEN	Matti Lund Nielsen	32	7	26+1	5	5	2
10	FW	(Sweden) SWE	Jonas Lindberg	28	1	16+8	1	2+2	0
11	DF	(Norway) NOR	Joackim Jørgensen	30	3	22+2	3	5+1	0
13	DF	(Norway) NOR	Ole Hansen	6	0	1+1	0	3+1	0
14	MF	(Norway) NOR	Tobias Heintz	29	6	9+13	3	5+2	3
15	DF	(Norway) NOR	Sigurd Rosted	33	4	27	4	6	0
16	DF	(Norway) NOR	Joachim Thomassen	32	1	26	1	6	0
17	MF	(Norway) NOR	Kristoffer Zachariassen	34	10	29	8	4+1	2
18	MF	(Norway) NOR	Tor Øyvind Hovda	13	0	0+10	0	2+1	0
19	MF	(Senegal) SEN	Krépin Diatta	27	8	14+8	3	5	5
20	DF	(Norway) NOR	Anders Østli	13	1	10+2	1	1	0
21	GK	(Norway) NOR	Anders Kristiansen	32	0	30	0	2	0
22	MF	(Norway) NOR	Jon-Helge Tveita	19	0	9+8	0	2	0
23	MF	(Norway) NOR	Kristoffer Normann Hansen	5	0	1+3	0	0+1	0
24	MF	(Cape Verde) CPV	Nenass	1	0	1	0	0	0
29	DF	(Norway) NOR	Alexander Groven	5	0	1+3	0	1	0
45	FW	(Norway) NOR	Jørgen Strand Larsen	6	3	0+3	0	1+2	3
69	FW	(Denmark) DEN	Patrick Mortensen	36	15	30	12	5+1	3
77	MF	(Ethiopia) ETH	Amin Askar	14	0	11	0	3	0
Players away from Sarpsborg 08 on loan:
Players who left Sarpsborg 08 during the season:
6	MF	(Norway) NOR	Anders Trondsen	21	4	18	2	2+1	2
44	FW	(Kosovo) KOS	Erton Fejzullahu	15	6	4+8	2	2+1	4

=== Goal scorers ===
Place	Position	Nation	Number	Name	Tippeligaen	Norwegian Cup	Total
1	FW	(Denmark)	69	Patrick Mortensen	12	3	15
2	MF	(Norway)	17	Kristoffer Zachariassen	8	2	10
3	MF	(Senegal)	19	Krépin Diatta	3	5	8
4	MF	(Denmark)	8	Matti Lund Nielsen	5	2	7
4	MF	(Norway)	7	Ole Jørgen Halvorsen	4	3	7
6	MF	(Norway)	14	Tobias Heintz	3	3	6
6	FW	(Kosovo)	44	Erton Fejzullahu	2	4	6
8	DF	(Norway)	15	Sigurd Rosted	4	0	4
8	MF	(Norway)	6	Anders Trondsen	2	2	4
10	DF	(Norway)	11	Joackim Jørgensen	3	0	3
10	FW	(Norway)	45	Jørgen Strand Larsen	0	3	3
12				own goal	1	1	2
13	DF	(Norway)	20	Anders Østli	1	0	1
13	FW	(Sweden)	10	Jonas Lindberg	1	0	1
13	DF	(Norway)	16	Joachim Thomassen	1	0	1
				TOTALS	50	28	78

=== Disciplinary record ===
Number	Nation	Position	Name	Tippeligaen		Norwegian Cup		Total	
Number	Nation	Position	Name	Yellow card	Red card	Yellow card	Red card	Yellow card	Red card
2	(Denmark)	DF	Andreas Albech	7	2	1	0	8	2
6	(Norway)	MF	Anders Trondsen	3	0	0	0	3	0
6	(Denmark)	MF	Nicolai Poulsen	1	0	0	0	1	0
7	(Norway)	MF	Ole Jørgen Halvorsen	5	0	0	0	5	0
8	(Denmark)	MF	Matti Lund Nielsen	4	0	0	0	4	0
10	(Sweden)	FW	Jonas Lindberg	1	0	0	0	1	0
11	(Norway)	DF	Joackim Jørgensen	2	0	1	0	3	0
13	(Norway)	DF	Ole Hansen	1	0	0	0	1	0
15	(Norway)	DF	Sigurd Rosted	3	1	1	0	4	1
16	(Norway)	DF	Joachim Thomassen	5	0	0	0	5	0
17	(Norway)	MF	Kristoffer Zachariassen	5	0	1	0	6	0
18	(Norway)	MF	Tor Øyvind Hovda	1	0	0	0	1	0
19	(Senegal)	MF	Krépin Diatta	1	0	1	0	2	0
20	(Norway)	DF	Anders Østli	1	0	0	0	1	0
21	(Norway)	GK	Anders Kristiansen	1	0	0	0	1	0
29	(Norway)	DF	Alexander Groven	1	0	0	0	1	0
44	(Kosovo)	FW	Erton Fejzullahu	1	0	0	0	1	0
69	(Denmark)	FW	Patrick Mortensen	0	0	1	0	1	0
77	(Ethiopia)	MF	Amin Askar	3	0	0	0	3	0
			TOTALS	47	3	5	0	52	3
