= Rosted =

Rosted is a surname. Notable people with the surname include:

- Jacob Rosted (1750–1833), Norwegian educator, editor, and librarian
- Sigurd Rosted (born 1994), Norwegian footballer

== See also ==
- Rosten
