= Jörgen Lennartsson =

Swedish footballer and manager (born 1965)

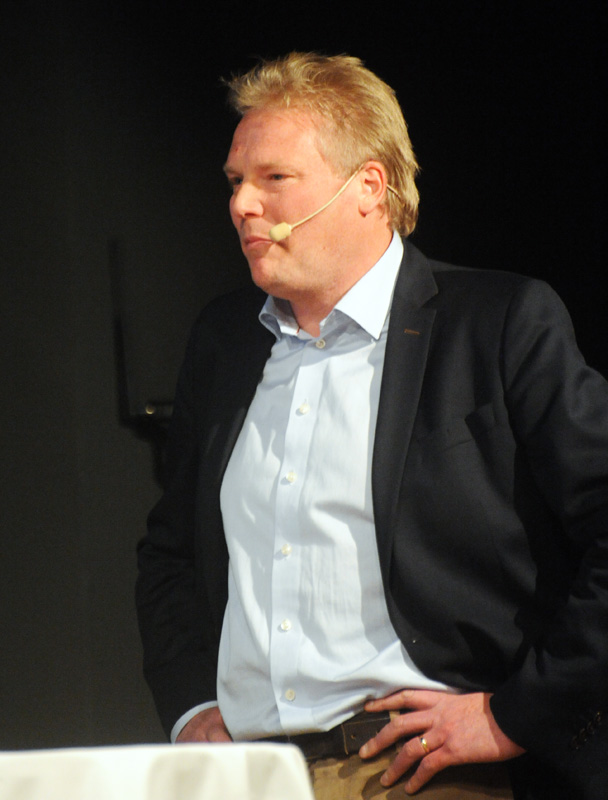

Personal information
- Full name: Dan Inge Jörgen Lennartsson
- Date of birth: 10 April 1965 (age 61)
- Place of birth: Växjö, Sweden
- Position: Midfielder

Senior career*
Years	Team	Apps	(Gls)
1980–1983	Växjö Norra IF		
1984–1986	FK Växjö		

Managerial career
- 1989: Vederslöv/Dänningelanda IF
- 2000–2001: Helsingborgs IF (assistant)
- 2002–2004: BK Häcken
- 2005: Sweden U17
- 2005: Sweden U21 (assistant)
- 2006–2010: Sweden U21
- 2011: Stabæk
- 2012–2013: IF Elfsborg
- 2015–2017: IFK Göteborg
- 2018–2019: Lillestrøm SK
- 2021–2022: Helsingborgs IF
- 2024: Al Fateh (assistant)
- * Club domestic league appearances and goals

Dan Inge Jörgen Lennartsson (born 10 April 1965) is a Swedish football manager and former player.

== Career ==
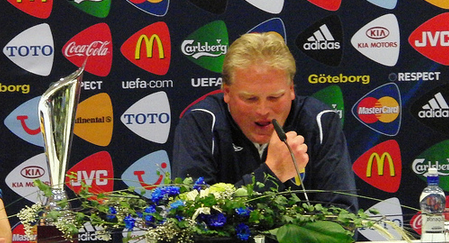
Lennartsson at a press conference during his time in charge of the Sweden national U21 team.

Lennartsson was born in Växjö. He became the manager of the Swedish U21 team after he had held many positions in various clubs in Sweden, the majority of which were youth coach and assistant manager positions.

After the appointment of Erik Hamrén as the head coach of the Sweden men's national football team there was speculation about Lennartsson being appointed assistant coach.

On 2 August 2010, Stabæk announced that Lennartson would take over as head coach, and replace Jan Jönsson on 1 January 2011. But only after one season in Stabæk, Lennartson had to leave his post as a manager due to Stabæks big economic problems.

Before the 2012 Allsvenskan season, Lennartsson signed a four-year contract as a head manager for IF Elfsborg. He took over Elfsborg from Magnus Haglund who had been in Elfsborg for eight years, but moved to be the coach of Lillestrøm SK. Lennartsson had been under Elfsborg's radar for a long time, not only for his achievements with the Sweden U21 team, the bronze medal in the UEFA European Under-21 Football Championship, but mostly for his passion to football and his strong authority and leadership. He has much knowledge about football and experience as a coach after 20 years at the sideline. His first player to buy was Joackim Jørgensen from Sarpsborg 08 in Norway, a player as he described was much alike Jari Ilola. He played in the Europa League qualification 2012–13 with Elfsborg.

On 30 September 2013, IF Elfsborg sacked manager Jörgen Lennartsson.

Before the start of the 2015 Allsvenskan season, IFK Göteborg appointed Lennartsson as manager following the sacking of previous head coach Mikael Stahre.

== Honours ==
=== Manager ===
BK Häcken

- Superettan: 2004 Superettan

IF Elfsborg

- Allsvenskan: 2012 Allsvenskan
