= Rosten =

Rosten is a surname. Notable people with the surname include:

- Daniel Rostén (born 1977), Swedish musician
- Harvey Rosten (1948–1997), English physicist
- Irwin Rosten (1924–2010), American documentary filmmaker
- Leo Rosten (1908–1997), American humorist
- Norman Rosten (1913–1995), American poet, playwright, and novelist
