= Harvey Rosten Award for Excellence =

The Harvey Rosten Award for Excellence
- Date: 1998
- Website: http://rostenaward.com/

The Harvey Rosten Award for Excellence is an annual award celebrating a piece of work by a group or individual representing an advance in thermal analysis of electronics equipment or components. Including experiments aimed at specifically validating numerical models.

The award is named after Dr. Harvey Rosten, founder of Flomerics, in honor of the influence on the electronics cooling industry he had. The award was curated the year after his death by (1998). The award is announced at the annual SEMI-THERM conference.

To be eligible, submitted papers must be an original pieces of work as well as in the public domain. The work must also be relevant, concerning advances in thermal analysis or thermal modelling of electronics equipment or component and have clear application to practical electronics thermal design.

== Criteria ==
To be eligible, submitted papers must be an original pieces of work as well as in the public domain. The work must also be relevant, concerning advances in thermal analysis or thermal modelling of electronics equipment or component and have clear application to practical electronics thermal design.

Favourable consideration is administered towards papers that either demonstrate an innovative approach to embodying the understanding of the physical processes affecting the thermal behaviour of an electronics component, part or system, insights into these processes, or a practical application of the advance.
