= Harvey Rosten =

English physicist

- Born: Harvey Ivor Rosten; 3 October 1948; Hackney, London
- Died: 23 June 1997 (aged 48); Surrey, England
- Occupation: CFD Engineer

Harvey Ivor Rosten (3 October 1948 – 23 June 1997) was an English physicist of London University (Queen Mary College) and Cambridge University (Dept. of Applied and Theoretical Physics).

== Career ==
He spent 14 years working for CHAM Ltd as a Project Engineer, in this time he was the manager responsible for the development of the world's first commercial general–purpose Computational Fluid Dynamics (CFD) software, PHOENICS.

In 1988, Rosten co-founded Flomerics with colleague Dr. David Thatchell of Imperial College London where he assumed the role of Technical Director of FloTHERM. In this position he developed Flomerics involvement with DELPHI (DEvelopment of Libraries of PHysical models for an Integrated design environment).

== Legacy ==
The Harvey Rosten Award for Excellence was established in 1998 in celebration of Rosten's contributions to CFD and the electronics cooling industry.
