= Joackim Jørgensen =

Norwegian footballer (born 1988)

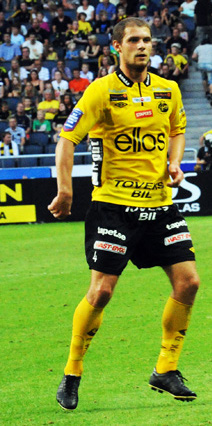

Personal information
- Full name: Joackim Jørgensen
- Date of birth: 20 September 1988 (age 38)
- Place of birth: Yven, Norway
- Height: 1.82 m (6 ft 0 in)
- Positions: Centre back; defensive midfielder

Team information
- Current team: IK Start
- Number: 6

Youth career
- 1996: Yven IF
- 2002: Borg Fotball

Senior career*
Years	Team	Apps	(Gls)
2007	Sparta Sarpsborg	22	(1)
2008–2011	Sarpsborg	71	(12)
2008–2009	→ Lørenskog (loan)	12	(2)
2012–2013	Elfsborg	37	(1)
2014–2017	Viking	73	(2)
2017–2019	Sarpsborg 08	48	(3)
2019–2021	Start	48	(1)
- * Club domestic league appearances and goals as of 29 Nov 2023

Joackim Jørgensen (born 20 September 1988) is a former Norwegian professional footballer who last played for IK Start in the Norwegian 1st division.

== Early years ==
Joackim was born in Sarpsborg on 20 September 1988. Jørgensen started his career for his home town club Yven IF and played there until he was 14 years old when he moved to Sarpsborg youth academy. Joackim stayed in the club and at the age of 18, made his debut for Sarpsborg's first team.

== Career ==
=== Sarpsborg 08 ===
Joackim's senior career started out for FK Sparta Sarpsborg (now Sarpsborg 08), where he played every game in his debut season in the 2007 Adeccoligaen season. He played 27 matches and scored one goal, but during the season he played various positions. In 2008 he was sent on loan to Lørenskog IF on a one-year deal. He was one on the squad when Sarpsborg 08 got promoted to Tippeligaen, the first division in Norway. The following season in Tippeligaen, Sarpsborg got relegated back to Adeccoligaen. His goal against Viking on 30 June 2011; a shot from 31 metres was nominated as goal of the year in the Tippeliga.

=== IF Elfsborg ===
Jørgensen was sold to IF Elfsborg on 20 November 2011 for around £300,000-£600,000, making this the biggest deal in the history of Sarpsborg 08. The club president later confirmed the deal and Jørgensen said that he had never worked with such a professional club as Elfsborg. He stated that the reasoning behind choosing Elfsborg ahead of other Norwegian clubs was Jörgen Lennartssons qualities as a manager and the way Elfsborg plays football.

Joackim's comments on the transfer were: "Elfsborg is probably the team that will bring me the most and I think I can perform well at this club. They have a good staff of coaches and a lot of good players. I like the way Elfsborg wants to play, they like to play the ball. I like the passing mentality. I hope I can contribute in the penalty area, both offensively and defensively."

The new head coach of Elfsborg, Jörgen Lennartsson was the one who scouted Joackim already during his time at Stabæk. He commented on Joackim: "He is a type of player I think we are missing a little. He is a Jari Illola-type, slow but still skilled. I followed him during my time at Stabæk and he has done an incredibly good job at Sarpsborg. He is a typical two-way player and he's really fit. 28 starts in Tippeligaen this season. I think he has a very good shot and is good in his main game. He is a good team player and a great guy, I'm very happy that we could bring him to Elfsborg."

=== IK Start ===
On 6 August 2018, Jørgensen announced that he would join IK Start after the season.

== Personal life ==
On the night of 25 April 2010, the same day as Sarpsborg 08 was meeting Follo in Adeccoligaen, Jørgensen was caught driving under the influence. He did not serve time in prison, instead he was sentenced to pay a fine of 25 000 kr.

== Career statistics ==
As of 15 May 2021

Season	Club	Division	League		Cup		Other		Total	
Season	Club	Division	Apps	Goals	Apps	Goals	Apps	Goals	Apps	Goals
2007	Sparta Sarpsborg	Adeccoligaen	22	0	0	0	-	-	22	0
2008	Sarpsborg 08	Adeccoligaen	4	0	0	0	-	-	4	0
2008	Lørenskog	Second Division	N/A		-	-	-	-	N/A	
2009	Lørenskog	Second Division	N/A		2	0	-	-	N/A	
2009	Sarpsborg 08	Adeccoligaen	14	2	0	0	3	1	17	3
2010	Sarpsborg 08	Adeccoligaen	25	7	3	1	0	0	28	8
2011	Sarpsborg 08	Tippeligaen	28	4	4	0	0	0	32	4
2012	Elfsborg	Allsvenskan	22	0	0	0	2	0	21	0
2013	Elfsborg	Allsvenskan	15	1	0	0	5	0	20	1
2014	Viking	Tippeligaen	27	0	4	0	0	0	31	0
2015	Viking	Tippeligaen	23	1	2	0	0	0	25	1
2016	Viking	Tippeligaen	22	1	2	0	0	0	24	1
2017	Sarpsborg 08	Eliteserien	24	3	5	0	-	-	29	3
2018	Sarpsborg 08	Eliteserien	22	0	1	0	10	0	33	0
2019	Start	OBOS-ligaen	25	1	1	0	-	-	26	1
2020	Start	Eliteserien	22	0	0	0	-	-	22	0
2021	Start	OBOS-ligaen	1	0	0	0	-	-	1	0
Career total			296	20	24	1	20	1	340	22

== Honours ==
Elfsborg

- Allsvenskan: 2012
