= Krépin Diatta =

Senegalese footballer (born 1999)

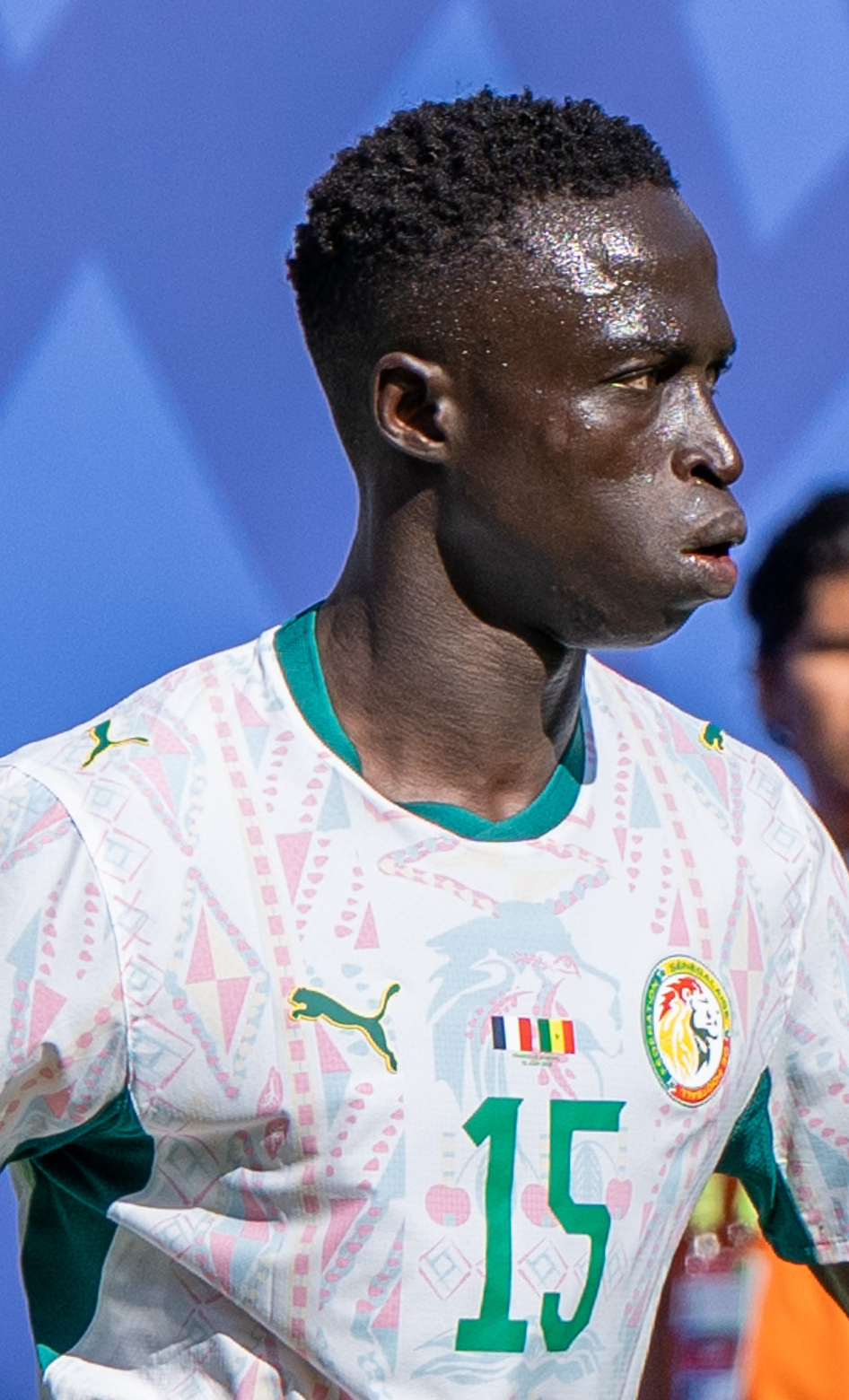
- Diatta with Senegal in 2026

Personal information
- Full name: Krépin Diatta
- Date of birth: 25 February 1999 (age 27)
- Place of birth: Dakar, Senegal
- Height: 1.75 m (5 ft 9 in)
- Positions: Wing-back; winger

Team information
- Current team: Watford
- Number: 15

Youth career
- 2014–2016: Santhiaba Zinguinchor
- 2016–2017: Oslo Football Academy Dakar

Senior career*
Years	Team	Apps	(Gls)
2017–2018	Sarpsborg 08	22	(3)
2018–2021	Club Brugge	72	(18)
2021–2026	Monaco	114	(6)
2026–	Watford	5	(0)

International career^{‡}
2016–2017	Senegal U20	19	(7)
2019–	Senegal	66	(2)
Medal record
Representing Senegal
Africa Cup of Nations
Runner-up	2019 Egypt
Runner-up	2025 Morocco
U-20 Africa Cup of Nations
Runner-up	2017 Zambia
- * Club domestic league appearances and goals as of 3 November 2026 (UTC) ‡ National team caps and goals as of 15:40, 2 July 2026 (UTC)

Krépin Diatta (born 25 February 1999) is a Senegalese professional footballer who plays as a wing-back for the Senegal national team and EFL Championship side Watford.

== Club career ==
=== Sarpsborg 08 ===
On 26 February 2017, Diatta signed a four-year contract with Sarpsborg 08. On 4 April 2017, he made his Sarpsborg debut in a 3–1 home win against Sogndal, subbing-in, in the 83rd minute for Ole Jørgen Halvorsen. On 26 April 2017, he scored his first goal for the club in a 10–1 win against Division 3 side Drøbak-Frogn, scoring a hat-trick along with teammates Erton Fejzullahu and Jørgen Larsen. On 13 August 2017, he scored his first league goal for Sarpsborg in a 2–2 away draw against Kristiansund, heading in, in the 80th minute from a cross from Halvorsen. He helped Sarpsborg reach the 2017 Norwegian Football Cup Final, scoring 5 goals in the process. Sarpsborg eventually lost 3–2 against Lillestrøm and finished as runners-up.

=== Club Brugge ===
On 3 January 2018, Diatta signed a four-and-a-half-year contract with Club Brugge KV. On 8 April 2018, he made his Club Brugge debut in a 1–0 away loss against Gent, subbing-in, in the 46th minute for Ahmed Touba. On 22 July 2018, Diatta played in the 2018 Belgian Super Cup, playing 80 minutes until he was subbed-out for Dion Cools. The match eventually ended 2–1 in favour of Club Brugge. On 24 October 2018, Diatta made his UEFA Champions League debut in a 1–1 home draw against AS Monaco, coming on as an injury time substitute for Emmanuel Dennis. On 14 February 2019, he made his UEFA Europa League debut in a 2–1 home win against FC Salzburg in the 2018–19 UEFA Europa League round of 32. On 10 March 2019, he scored his first goal for the club in a 4–0 away win against Eupen, shooting from the left side of the box and into the bottom right corner of the net in the 23rd minute.

=== Monaco ===
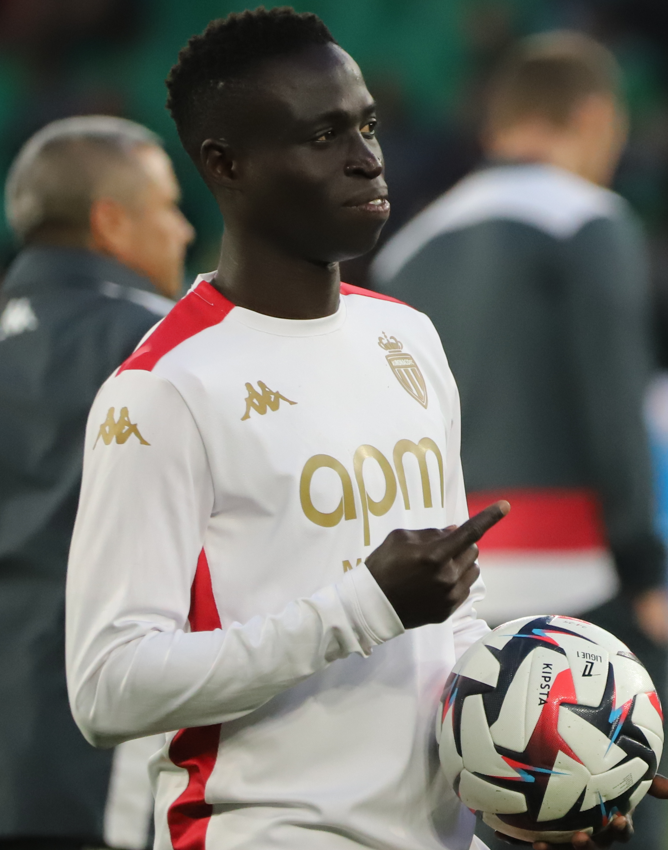
Diatta with Monaco in 2025

On 21 January 2021, Diatta joined Ligue 1 side Monaco in a deal running until 2025. He scored his first European goal for Monaco against Sturm Graz with a header in a win in the group stage of the Europa League. On 19 November 2021, he scored his first league goal in Ligue 1 of the season against Lille. During the match, he suffered an injury of the anterior cruciate ligament of the left knee.

=== Watford ===
On 1 October 2026, Diatta signed for Championship side Watford on a free transfer.

== International career ==
=== Under-20 ===
Diatta was part of the Senegal U20s who participated in the 2017 Africa U-20 Cup of Nations. He scored two goals in the tournament, both of which came in the group stage his first a 70th-minute header against South Africa in a 7-goal thriller, and his second, a goal in the added time of the first half against Cameroon. Senegal eventually lost 2–0 against Zambia in the final and finished runners-up. They thus qualified for the 2017 FIFA U-20 World Cup. Diatta was part of the Senegal U20s who participated in the 2017 FIFA U-20 World Cup in South Korea. On 22 May 2017, he played in Senegal's 2–0 opening match win against Saudi Arabia. Senegal were knocked out of the tournament in the round of 16 after they lost 1–0 against Mexico.

=== Senior ===
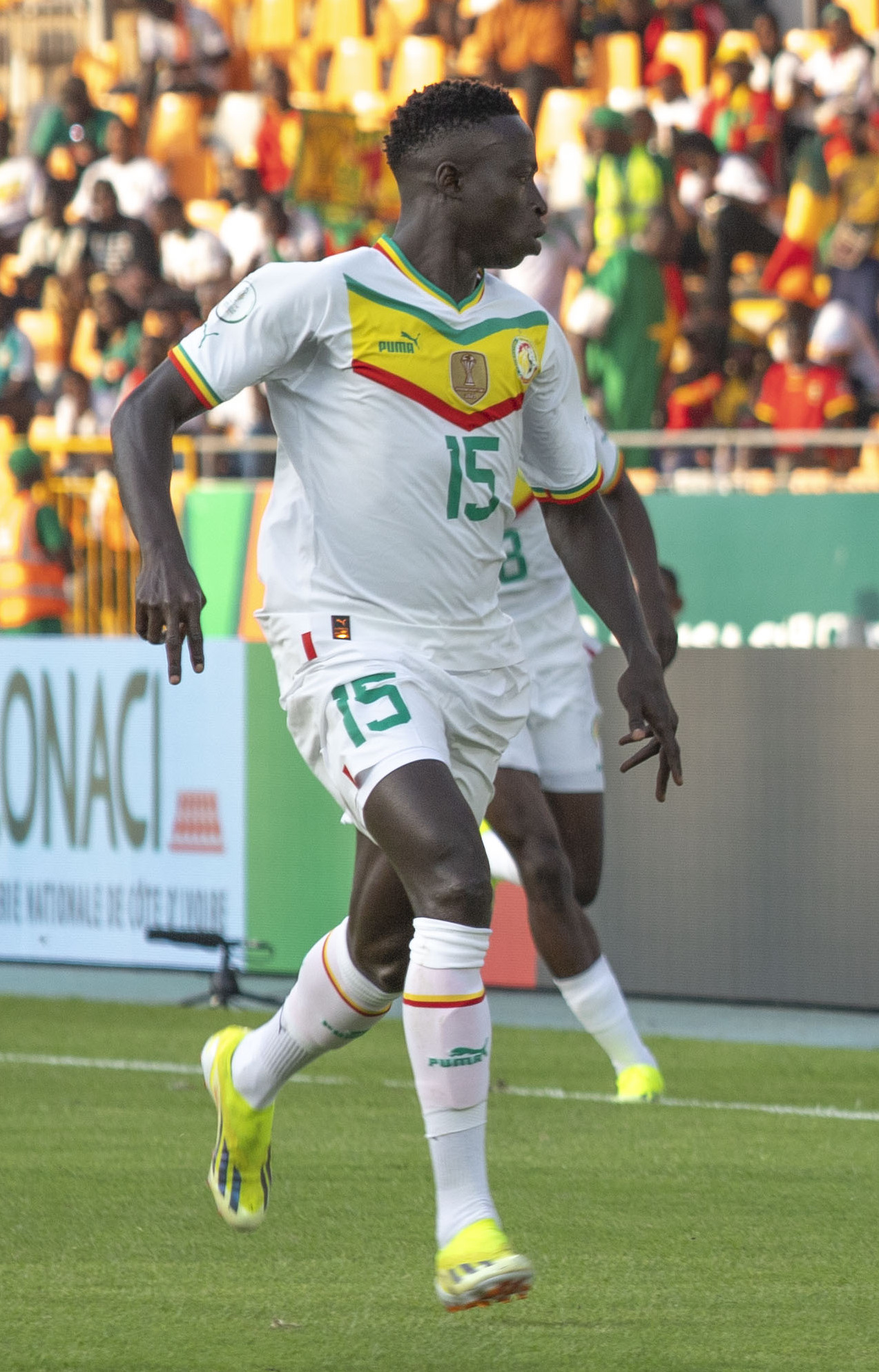
Diatta with Senegal at the 2023 Africa Cup of Nations

In March 2019, Diatta was one of four young Senegalese players to receive a debut call-up to the national team. On 23 March 2019, he made his national team debut in a 2–0 win against Madagascar in the 2019 Africa Cup of Nations qualifiers. On 13 June 2019, he was named in Senegal's 23-man squad for the 2019 Africa Cup of Nations in Egypt. On 23 June 2019, he scored his first-ever senior international goal in Senegal's 2–0 opening match win against Tanzania, scoring in the 64th minute from a 20-yard first time finish. He appeared in all of Senegal's matches during the tournament, including a substitute appearance in the team's 1–0 loss to Algeria in the final. For his performances, Diatta was named the Best Young Player of the tournament by CAF.

Diatta missed Senegal's successful 2021 Africa Cup of Nations due to an anterior cruciate ligament injury. In November 2022, he was named in coach Aliou Cissé's squad for the 2022 FIFA World Cup and went on to play in three of Senegal's four matches as the nation reached the round of 16 for the first time since its debut in 2002.

In December 2023, he was named in Senegal's squad for the postponed 2023 Africa Cup of Nations held in the Ivory Coast. In December 2025, he was called up for the 2025 Africa Cup of Nations. He suffered a muscle strain during warm-up before the final, causing him to miss the match.

On 21 May 2026, Diatta was officially selected by Senegal's coach Pape Thiaw from his list of 28 players to participate in the 2026 FIFA World Cup.

== Career statistics ==
=== Club ===
As of match played 19 April 2026

Appearances and goals by club, season and competition
Club	Season	League			National cup (Note: Includes Norwegian Cup, Belgian Cup, Coupe de France)		Europe		Other		Total	
Club	Season	Division	Apps	Goals	Apps	Goals	Apps	Goals	Apps	Goals	Apps	Goals
Sarpsborg 08	2017	Eliteserien	22	3	5	5	—		—		27	8
Club Brugge	2017–18	Belgian Pro League	8	0	0	0	0	0	—		8	0
Club Brugge	2018–19	Belgian Pro League	23	2	0	0	4 (Note: Two appearances in UEFA Champions League, two appearances in UEFA Europa League)	0	1 (Note: Appearance in Belgian Super Cup)	0	28	2
Club Brugge	2019–20	Belgian Pro League	22	6	4	1	9 (Note: Eight appearances and one goal in UEFA Champions League, one appearance in UEFA Europa League)	1	—		35	8
Club Brugge	2020–21	Belgian Pro League	19	10	0	0	5 (Note: Appearances in UEFA Champions League)	0	—		24	10
Club Brugge	Total		72	18	4	1	18	1	1	0	95	20
Monaco	2020–21	Ligue 1	12	1	4	0	—		—		16	1
Monaco	2021–22	Ligue 1	8	1	0	0	5 (Note: Two appearances in UEFA Champions League, three appearances and one goal in UEFA Europa League)	1	—		13	2
Monaco	2022–23	Ligue 1	31	4	1	0	10 (Note: Two appearances in UEFA Champions League, eight appearances and one goal in UEFA Europa League)	1	—		42	5
Monaco	2023–24	Ligue 1	26	0	0	0	—		—		26	0
Monaco	2024–25	Ligue 1	19	0	1	0	4	0	0	0	24	0
Monaco	2025–26	Ligue 1	18	0	1	0	3	0	—		22	0
Monaco	Total		114	6	7	0	22	2	0	0	143	8
Career total			208	27	16	6	40	3	1	0	265	36

=== International ===
As of match played 1 July 2026

Appearances and goals by national team and year
National team	Year	Apps	Goals
Senegal	2019	13	1
Senegal	2020	3	0
Senegal	2021	8	1
Senegal	2022	5	0
Senegal	2023	8	0
Senegal	2024	7	0
Senegal	2025	11	0
Senegal	2026	11	0
Total		66	2

Scores and results list Senegal's goal tally first, score column indicates score after each Diatta goal.

List of international goals scored by Krépin Diatta
No.	Date	Venue	Opponent	Score	Result	Competition
1	23 June 2019	30 June Stadium, Cairo, Egypt	Tanzania	2–0	2–0	2019 Africa Cup of Nations
2	5 June 2021	Stade Lat-Dior, Thiès, Senegal	Zambia	2–0	3–1	Friendly

== Honours ==
Sarpsborg 08

- Norwegian Cup runner-up: 2017

Club Brugge

- Belgian First Division A: 2017–18, 2019–20
- Belgian Super Cup: 2018
- Belgian Cup runner-up: 2019–20

Monaco

- Coupe de France runner-up: 2020–21

Individual

- Africa U-20 Cup of Nations Best XI: 2017
- Eliteserien Breakthrough of the Year: 2017
- Best Young Player in African Cup of Nations 2019
