= Matti Lund Nielsen =

Danish footballer (born 1988)

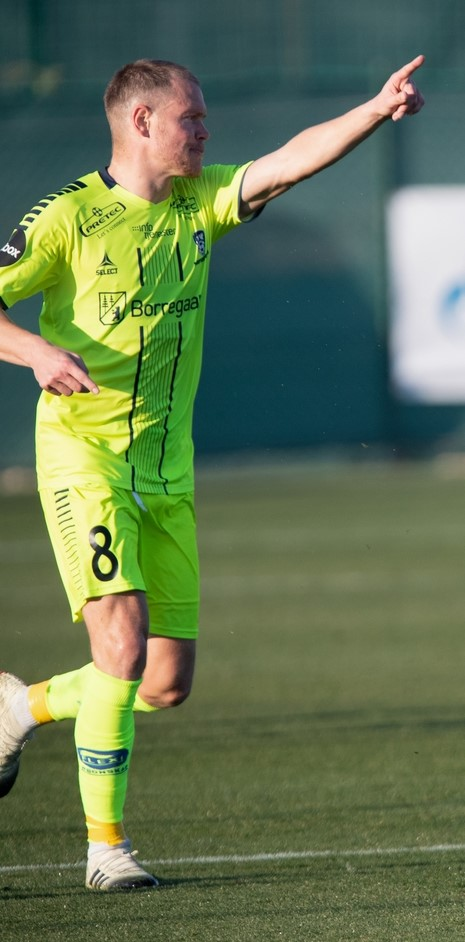
- Nielsen in 2019

Personal information
- Date of birth: 8 May 1988 (age 38)
- Place of birth: Odense, Denmark
- Height: 1.84 m (6 ft 0 in)
- Position: Midfielder

Youth career
- Tarup
- Holluf Pile
- –2005: Fraugde IF
- 2005–2007: OB

Senior career*
Years	Team	Apps	(Gls)
2007–2010	OB	9	(0)
2008–2009	→ Lyngby (loan)	24	(3)
2010–2012	Nordsjælland	49	(7)
2012–2015	Pescara	61	(4)
2013	→ Verona (loan)	12	(0)
2015	→ AC Perugia (loan)	12	(0)
2015–2016	OB	2	(0)
2016–2019	Sarpsborg 08	109	(8)
2020	Reggina	8	(0)
2020–2021	Pro Vercelli	35	(0)
2021–2024	Hvidovre	41	(0)

International career
2004–2005	Denmark U17	15	(0)
2005–2006	Denmark U18	4	(0)
2006–2007	Denmark U19	8	(0)
2007–2008	Denmark U20	4	(0)
2009–2011	Denmark U21	15	(1)
- * Club domestic league appearances and goals

Matti Lund Nielsen (born 8 May 1988) is a Danish former professional footballer who played as a midfielder.

Nielsen has amassed a total 46 youth caps for Denmark under five different age groups.

== Career ==
=== OB ===
Nielsen made his professional debut for OB on 4 March 2007 in the Royal League game against Lillestrøm.

He was sent on a one-season loan for the 2008–09 season to Lyngby Boldklub.

=== Nordsjælland ===
In December 2009, Nielsen signed a two-and-a-half-year contract with Danish Superliga club Nordsjælland starting from 1 January 2010.

=== Pescara ===
On 30 December 2011, it was confirmed that Nielsen would transfer to Pescara on a free transfer, signing a contract until summer 2014.

=== Return to OB ===
On 19 September 2015, OB announced that Nielsen was signed for the remainder of the calendar year.

=== Reggina ===
On 7 January 2020, he returned to Italy, signing a one-and-a-half-year contract with Serie C club Reggina.

=== Pro Vercelli ===
On 22 September 2020, he moved to Pro Vercelli.

On 24 May 2024, he announced that he retired from football.

== Career statistics ==
=== Club ===
As of match played 14 August 2023

Appearances and goals by club, season and competition
Club	Season	League			National cup (Note: Includes Danish Cup, Coppa Italia, Norwegian Football Cup)		Europe		Total	
Club	Season	Division	Apps	Goals	Apps	Goals	Apps	Goals	Apps	Goals
OB	2007–08	Danish Superliga	8	0	0	0	—		8	0
OB	2008–09	Danish Superliga	1	0	0	0	2 (Note: Appearance in UEFA Intertoto Cup)	0	3	0
OB	Total		9	0	0	0	2	0	12	0
Lyngby (loan)	2008–09	Danish 1st Division	24	3	2	2	—		26	5
Nordsjælland	2009–10	Danish Superliga	13	0	4	0	—		17	0
Nordsjælland	2010–11	Danish Superliga	26	7	4	0	1 (Note: Appearance(s) in UEFA Europa League)	0	31	7
Nordsjælland	2011–12	Danish Superliga	10	0	0	0	—		10	0
Nordsjælland	Total		49	7	8	0	1	0	58	7
Pescara	2011–12	Serie B	19	3	0	0	—		19	3
Pescara	2012–13	Serie A	19	0	2	0	—		21	0
Pescara	2013–14	Serie B	17	1	2	0	—		19	1
Pescara	2014–15	Serie B	6	0	2	0	—		8	0
Pescara	Total		61	4	6	0	—		67	4
Hellas Verona (loan)	2012–13	Serie B	12	0	0	0	—		12	0
Perugia (loan)	2014–15	Serie B	12	0	0	0	—		12	0
OB	2015–16	Danish Superliga	2	0	1	0	—		3	0
Sarpsborg 08	2016	Tippeligaen	28	2	5	1	—		33	3
Sarpsborg 08	2017	Eliteserien	27	5	5	1	—		32	6
Sarpsborg 08	2018	Eliteserien	28	1	1	0	13	1	42	2
Sarpsborg 08	2019	Eliteserien	26	0	2	0	—		28	0
Sarpsborg 08	Total		109	8	13	2	13	1	135	11
Reggina	2019–20	Serie C	8	0	0	0	—		8	0
Pro Vercelli	2020–21	Serie C	35	0	0	0	—		35	0
Hvidovre	2021–22	Danish 1st Division	21	0	6	1	—		27	1
Hvidovre	2022–23	Danish 1st Division	17	0	1	0	—		18	0
Hvidovre	2023–24	Danish Superliga	1	0	0	0	—		1	0
Hvidovre	Total		39	0	7	1	—		46	1
Career total			360	22	37	5	16	1	413	28

== Honours ==
Nordsjælland

- Danish Superliga: 2011–12
- Danish Cup: 2009–10, 2010–11

Pescara

- Serie B: 2011–12
