= 2017 Eliteserien =

73rd season of top-tier football league in Norway

Eliteserien
- Season: 2017
- Dates: 1 April – 26 November
- Champions: Rosenborg; 25th title
- Relegated: Sogndal; Aalesund; Viking
- Champions League: Rosenborg
- Europa League: Molde; Sarpsborg 08; Lillestrøm
- Matches: 240
- Goals: 682 (2.84 per match)
- Top goalscorer: Nicklas Bendtner (19 goals)
- Biggest home win: Brann 5–0 Stabæk (19 June 2017)
- Biggest away win: Viking 1–7 Vålerenga (22 October 2017)
- Highest scoring: Viking 1–7 Vålerenga (22 October 2017)
- Longest winning run: Strømsgodset (8 games)
- Longest unbeaten run: Rosenborg; Brann; Sarpsborg 08; Strømsgodset (8 games)
- Longest winless run: Aalesund (13 games)
- Longest losing run: Viking (5 games)
- Highest attendance: 21,112; Rosenborg 1–2 Tromsø (16 May 2017)
- Lowest attendance: 2,237; Sogndal 4–1 Stabæk (5 April 2017)
- Average attendance: 6,699 ▼3.9%

The 2017 Eliteserien was the 73rd completed season of top-tier football in Norway. The season began on 1 April 2017 and ended on 26 November 2017, not including play-off matches. This was first season of Eliteserien as rebranding from Tippeligaen. Rosenborg were the defending champions, while Kristiansund and Sandefjord entered as the promoted teams from the 2016 1. divisjon.

The 2017 season saw the name of the league change from Tippeligaen (named after sponsor Norsk Tipping) to Eliteserien, a non-sponsor affiliated name controlled by the Football Association of Norway. Rosenborg won their third consecutive title and 25th top-flight title overall, with two games to spare. Rosenborg conceded only 20 goals during the season, a league record.

== Overview ==
=== Rebranding ===
On 28 August 2016, the Football Association of Norway (NFF) and Norsk Toppfotball announced a rebrand; beginning with the 2017 season, the competition was known simply as Eliteserien, without any sponsor's name attached. As part of the rebranding, a new logo was introduced.

=== Summary ===
Rosenborg won their third consecutive title and 25th top-flight title overall. Rosenborg were the defending champions, while Kristiansund and Sandefjord entered as the promoted teams from the 2016 1. divisjon.

Rosenborg won the league with two games to spare. Aalesund and Viking were relegated directly. Fourteenth-finishers Sogndal were relegated after losing the play-off final to Ranheim.

== Teams ==
Sixteen teams competed in the league – the top fourteen teams from the previous season, and two teams promoted from the 1. divisjon. The promoted teams were Kristiansund (first season in the top-flight) and Sandefjord, (returning to the top flight after a season's absence). They replaced Bodø/Glimt and Start ending their top flight spells of three and four years respectively.

=== Stadia and locations ===
Locations of the teams in 2017 Eliteserien

Note: Table lists in alphabetical order.

Team	Ap.	Location	Arena	Turf	Capacity
Aalesund	16	Ålesund	Color Line Stadion	Artificial	10,778
Brann	60	Bergen	Brann Stadion	Natural	17,686
Haugesund	11	Haugesund	Haugesund Stadion	Natural	8,754
Kristiansund	1	Kristiansund	Kristiansund Stadion	Artificial	4,000
Lillestrøm	54	Lillestrøm	Åråsen Stadion	Natural	12,250
Molde	41	Molde	Aker Stadion	Artificial	11,800
Odd	36	Skien	Skagerak Arena	Artificial	12,500
Rosenborg	54	Trondheim	Lerkendal Stadion	Natural	21,405
Sandefjord	6	Sandefjord	Komplett Arena	Natural	6,582
Sarpsborg 08	6	Sarpsborg	Sarpsborg Stadion	Artificial	4,700
Sogndal	18	Sogndalsfjøra	Fosshaugane Campus	Artificial	5,539
Stabæk	21	Bærum	Nadderud Stadion	Natural	7,000
Strømsgodset	30	Drammen	Marienlyst Stadion	Artificial	8,935
Tromsø	30	Tromsø	Alfheim Stadion	Artificial	6,859
Vålerenga	57	Oslo	Intility Arena	Artificial	17,233
Viking	68	Stavanger	Viking Stadion	Natural	16,300

=== Personnel and kits ===
Team	Manager	Kit manufacturer	Sponsor
Aalesund	(Norway) Trond Fredriksen	Umbro	Sparebanken Møre
Brann	(Norway) Lars Arne Nilsen	Nike	Sparebanken Vest
Haugesund	(Norway) Eirik Horneland	Macron	Haugaland Kraft
Kristiansund	(Norway) Christian Michelsen	Umbro	SpareBank 1 Nordvest
Lillestrøm	(Norway) Arne Erlandsen	Legea	DNB
Molde	(Norway) Ole Gunnar Solskjær	Nike	Sparebanken Møre
Odd	(Norway) Dag-Eilev Fagermo	New Balance	SpareBank 1 Telemark
Rosenborg	(Norway) Kåre Ingebrigtsen	Adidas	SpareBank 1 SMN
Sandefjord	(Norway) Lars Bohinen	Macron	Jotun
Sarpsborg 08	(Norway) Geir Bakke	Select	Borregaard
Sogndal	(Norway) Eirik Bakke	Umbro	Sparebanken Vest
Stabæk	(Spain) Antoni Ordinas	Macron	SpareBank 1 Østlandet
Strømsgodset	(Norway) Tor Ole Skullerud	Puma	DNB
Tromsø	(Finland) Simo Valakari	Select	Sparebanken Nord-Norge
Vålerenga	(Norway) Ronny Deila	Umbro	DNB
Viking	(Norway) Bjarte Lunde Aarsheim (caretaker)	Diadora	Lyse

=== Managerial changes ===
Team	Outgoing manager	Manner of departure	Date of vacancy	Table	Incoming manager	Date of appointment	Table
Viking	(Sweden) Kjell Jonevret	Mutual agreement	14 November 2016	Pre-season	(England) Ian Burchnall	24 November 2016	Pre-season
Tromsø	(Norway) Bård Flovik	Sacked	26 June 2017	15th	(Finland) Simo Valakari	12 July 2017	15th
Viking	(England) Ian Burchnall	Sacked	9 November 2017	16th	(Norway) Bjarte Lunde Aarsheim (caretaker)	9 November 2017	16th

== League table ==
Pos	Team	Pld	W	D	L	GF	GA	GD	Pts	Qualification or relegation
1	Rosenborg (C)	30	18	7	5	57	20	+37	61	Qualification for the Champions League first qualifying round
2	Molde	30	16	6	8	50	35	+15	54	Qualification for the Europa League first qualifying round
3	Sarpsborg 08	30	13	12	5	50	36	+14	51	Qualification for the Europa League first qualifying round
4	Strømsgodset	30	14	8	8	45	37	+8	50	
5	Brann	30	13	8	9	51	36	+15	47	
6	Odd	30	12	6	12	27	39	−12	42	
7	Kristiansund	30	10	10	10	44	46	−2	40	
8	Vålerenga	30	11	6	13	48	46	+2	39	
9	Stabæk	30	10	9	11	46	50	−4	39	
10	Haugesund	30	11	6	13	35	39	−4	39	
11	Tromsø	30	10	8	12	42	49	−7	38	
12	Lillestrøm	30	10	7	13	40	43	−3	37	Qualification for the Europa League second qualifying round (Note: Lillestrøm qualified for the Europa League second qualifying round as winners of the 2017 Norwegian Cup.)
13	Sandefjord	30	11	3	16	38	51	−13	36	
14	Sogndal (R)	30	8	8	14	38	48	−10	32	Qualification for the relegation play-offs
15	Aalesund (R)	30	8	8	14	38	50	−12	32	Relegation to First Division
16	Viking (R)	30	6	6	18	33	57	−24	24	Relegation to First Division

Source: Football Association of Norway (in Norwegian), Soccerway
Rules for classification: 1) Points; 2) Goal difference; 3) Goals scored; 4) Head-to-head points; 5) Head-to-head goal difference; 6) Head-to-head away goals scored (only if between two teams); 7) Head-to-head goals scored; 8) Play-off (only used to decide champions or relegation).
(C) Champions; (R) Relegated

== Positions by round ==
Team ╲ Round	1	2	3	4	5	6	7	8	9	10	11	12	13	14	15	16	17	18	19	20	21	22	23	24	25	26	27	28	29	30
Rosenborg	1	1	2	1	1	1	1	1	1	1	1	1	2	1	1	1	1	1	1	1	1	1	1	1	1	1	1	1	1	1
Molde	6	3	6	2	5	5	6	7	10	7	7	7	5	5	4	3	3	3	4	4	4	4	4	3	2	2	2	2	2	2
Sarpsborg 08	2	2	1	3	2	2	2	4	4	3	3	2	3	3	3	4	2	2	2	2	2	3	2	2	3	3	3	3	3	3
Strømsgodset	4	11	8	10	6	9	10	12	13	14	10	13	13	14	14	12	13	12	8	9	10	9	6	6	6	4	4	4	4	4
Brann	8	4	7	5	4	4	5	3	3	2	2	3	1	2	2	2	4	4	3	3	3	2	3	4	4	5	5	5	5	5
Odd	16	12	14	9	11	7	4	2	2	5	4	4	4	7	8	9	10	6	9	7	8	6	7	7	7	7	7	7	9	6
Kristiansund	11	14	12	14	16	14	13	14	14	13	14	15	14	13	13	14	14	14	14	14	14	13	12	10	12	12	12	11	10	7
Vålerenga	7	7	9	15	9	12	12	10	7	9	8	8	7	6	6	7	7	11	11	12	12	12	11	12	9	8	8	9	6	8
Stabæk	3	10	5	4	3	3	3	5	5	4	5	6	9	10	9	5	6	7	7	6	7	8	9	9	8	9	9	8	7	9
Haugesund	14	9	4	7	8	6	7	8	12	12	13	10	8	8	7	8	5	5	6	5	5	5	5	5	5	6	6	6	8	10
Tromsø	9	5	3	6	7	11	11	11	9	8	11	14	15	15	15	15	15	16	16	15	15	15	15	15	15	14	13	13	11	11
Lillestrøm	5	8	11	13	15	13	14	15	15	15	15	11	10	11	10	10	9	10	12	10	9	10	10	11	11	11	10	12	13	12
Sandefjord	10	16	13	8	10	10	9	6	8	10	9	12	11	9	12	13	11	8	5	8	6	7	8	8	10	10	11	10	12	13
Sogndal	15	6	10	11	13	16	15	13	11	11	12	9	12	12	11	11	12	13	13	13	13	14	13	13	13	13	14	15	15	14
Aalesund	13	15	15	12	12	8	8	9	6	6	6	5	6	4	5	6	8	9	10	11	11	11	14	14	14	15	15	14	14	15
Viking	12	13	16	16	14	15	16	16	16	16	16	16	16	16	16	16	16	15	15	16	16	16	16	16	16	16	16	16	16	16

Leader
2018–19 UEFA Europa League first qualifying round
Relegation play-offs
Relegation to 2018 1. divisjon

Source: nifs.no

== Relegation play-offs ==
The 14th-placed team, Sogndal took part in a two-legged play-off against Ranheim, the winners of the 1. divisjon promotion play-offs, to decide who would play in the 2018 Eliteserien.

29 November 2017
18:00 CET (UTC+1)

Sogndal	1–0	Ranheim
Rindarøy 53'	Report

Fosshaugane Campus, Sogndalsfjøra
Attendance: 4,531
Referee: Tom Harald Hagen
2 December 2017
18:00 CET (UTC+1)

Ranheim	1–0 (a.e.t.)	Sogndal
Karlsen 88' (pen.)	Report
Penalties
Reginiussen (penalty scored); Kvande (penalty scored); Barli (penalty scored); Witry (penalty scored); Karlsen (penalty scored)	5–4	(penalty scored) Teniste; (penalty scored) Soltvedt; (penalty scored) Mandić; (penalty missed) Schulze; (penalty scored) Hovland

Extra Arena, Ranheim
Attendance: 1,343
Referee: Tore Hansen

1–1 on aggregate. Ranheim won 5–4 on penalties.

== Results ==
Home \ Away	AAL	BRA	HAU	KRI	LIL	MOL	ODD	ROS	SND	SRP	SOG	STB	STM	TRO	VÅL	VIK
Aalesund	—	3–3	0–1	1–1	3–1	0–3	5–1	2–1	2–0	1–3	0–1	1–1	4–3	3–1	0–1	1–1
Brann	1–1	—	3–1	0–4	2–0	4–1	2–0	0–3	5–0	0–1	2–1	5–0	3–0	2–2	0–0	1–1
Haugesund	2–0	2–3	—	2–3	1–1	0–0	0–2	1–0	2–0	0–0	0–0	2–2	1–3	2–0	4–3	2–1
Kristiansund	1–1	1–0	3–2	—	1–1	0–1	2–2	3–3	3–2	2–2	1–1	1–0	2–0	4–1	1–1	0–2
Lillestrøm	4–0	0–2	0–2	0–0	—	0–1	0–1	0–3	2–1	1–2	1–0	2–2	2–0	4–1	2–1	1–0
Molde	0–1	1–0	1–0	0–1	2–1	—	2–1	1–2	3–1	2–2	1–2	3–1	0–0	3–0	4–0	3–2
Odd	3–2	0–0	1–0	2–0	1–0	1–2	—	1–0	1–0	0–0	2–1	0–5	2–0	1–0	2–1	0–2
Rosenborg	0–0	2–1	0–1	4–1	1–1	2–1	3–0	—	5–1	1–1	3–0	0–0	3–1	1–2	3–0	2–0
Sandefjord	2–0	0–1	2–0	2–0	1–3	3–3	0–0	0–3	—	1–0	2–1	1–2	1–2	3–0	2–0	3–1
Sarpsborg 08	1–0	1–1	2–1	5–1	3–3	1–0	2–1	1–2	5–0	—	3–1	2–2	0–0	1–1	2–0	3–0
Sogndal	1–0	2–3	0–1	2–0	0–1	2–2	0–0	0–3	3–2	3–3	—	4–1	1–1	0–2	5–2	4–0
Stabæk	3–1	2–0	0–3	1–4	2–4	3–2	2–0	0–0	1–3	3–0	1–1	—	0–2	1–2	4–2	1–1
Strømsgodset	1–1	2–1	3–1	4–2	3–1	1–1	1–0	0–2	1–0	1–1	4–1	1–2	—	2–1	2–0	4–2
Tromsø	3–2	1–1	2–0	1–1	2–1	1–2	2–2	0–3	1–1	5–0	3–0	0–3	1–1	—	2–4	3–0
Vålerenga	5–1	2–1	3–0	1–0	3–1	1–2	2–0	1–1	1–2	1–2	3–0	1–1	1–1	0–0	—	1–0
Viking	1–2	2–4	1–1	2–1	2–2	2–3	3–0	0–1	0–2	2–1	1–1	2–0	0–1	1–2	1–7	—

Source: Football Association of Norway (in Norwegian)
Legend: Blue = home team win; Yellow = draw; Red = away team win.

== Season statistics ==
=== Top scorers ===
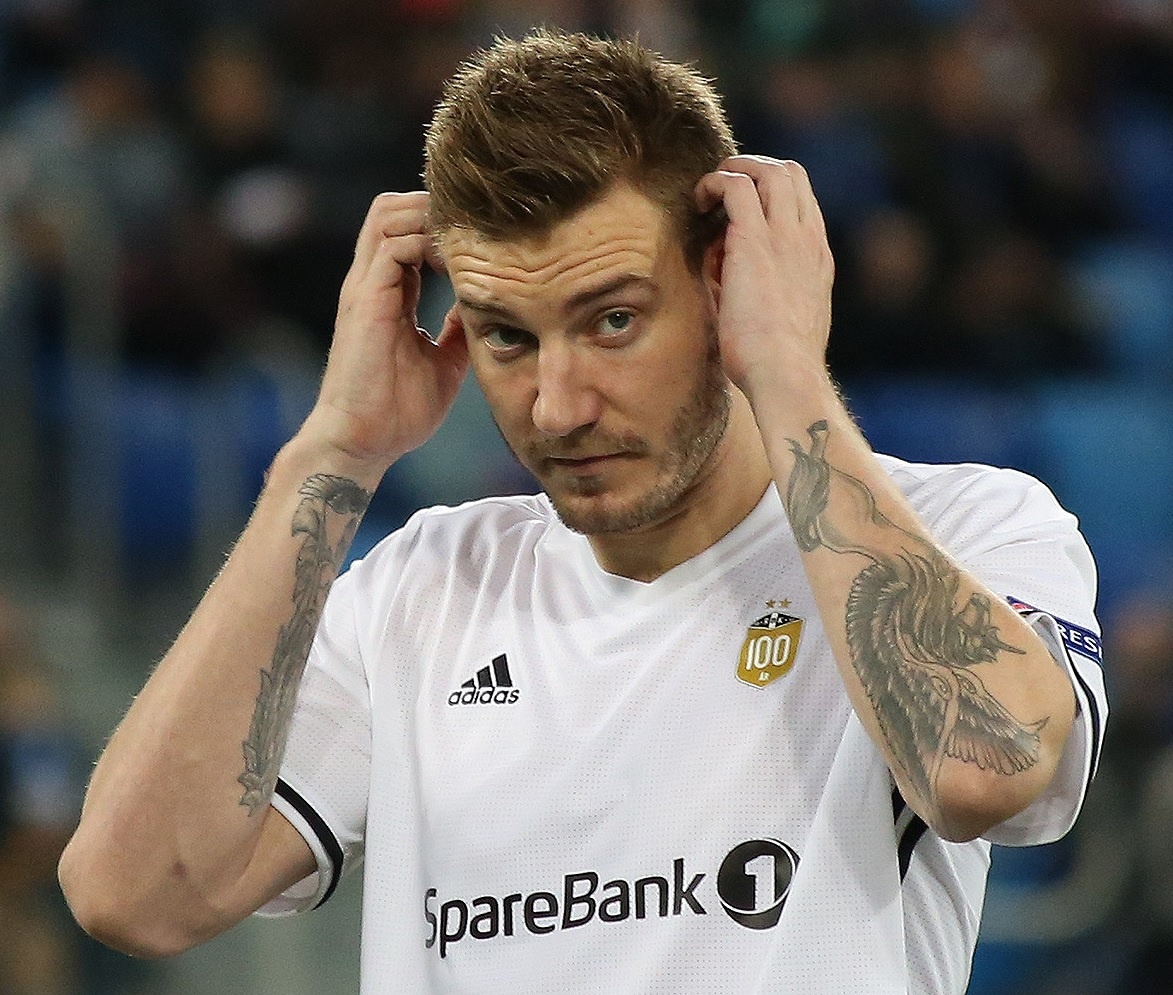
Rosenborgs's Nicklas Bendtner became the Eliteserien top scorer after scoring 19 goals.

Rank	Player	Club	Goals	Games	Average
1	(Denmark) Nicklas Bendtner	Rosenborg	19	29	0,66
2	(Norway) Ohi Omoijuanfo	Stabæk	17	27	0,63
3	(Iceland) Björn Bergmann Sigurðarson	Molde	16	27	0,59
3	(Norway) Mos	Aalesund	16	30	0,53
5	(Denmark) Patrick Mortensen	Sarpsborg 08	12	30	0,40
6	(Norway) Eirik Ulland Andersen	Strømsgodset	11	26	0,42
7	(Kosovo) Flamur Kastrati	Sandefjord	10	25	0,40
7	(Norway) Thomas Lehne Olsen	Tromsø	10	28	0,36
7	(Lebanon) Bassel Jradi	Strømsgodset	10	29	0,34
7	(Norway) Benjamin Stokke	Kristiansund	10	30	0,33

=== Hat-tricks ===
Player	For	Against	Result	Date
(Norway) Ohi Omoijuanfo	Stabæk	Aalesund	3–1 (H)	2 April 2017
(Norway) Ohi Omoijuanfo	Stabæk	Sarpsborg 08	3–0 (H)	17 April 2017
(Ghana) Gilbert Koomson	Sogndal	Viking	4–0 (H)	13 May 2017
(Norway) Erling Knudtzon	Lillestrøm	Tromsø	4–1 (H)	28 May 2017
(South Africa) Lars Veldwijk	Aalesund	Odd	5–1 (H)	25 June 2017
(Norway) Benjamin Stokke	Kristiansund	Stabæk	4–1 (A)	25 June 2017
(Norway) Simen Juklerød	Vålerenga	Viking	7–1 (A)	22 October 2017
(Norway) Mos	Aalesund	Strømsgodset	4–3 (H)	26 November 2017

Notes

(H) – Home team
(A) – Away team

=== Clean sheets ===
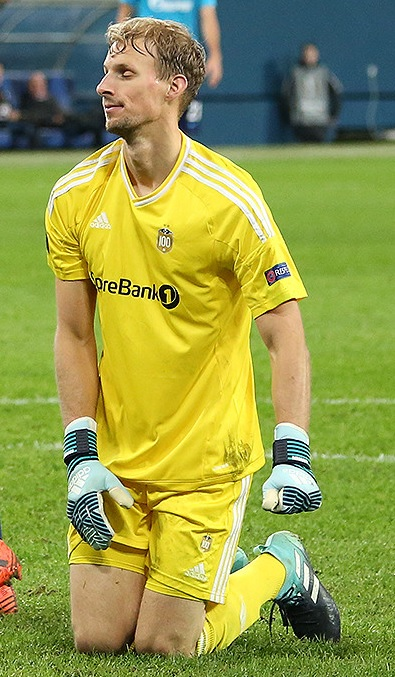
André Hansen of Rosenborg kept 11 clean sheets in 2017, one less than Haugesund's Per Kristian Bråtveit.

Rank	Player	Club	Clean sheets
1	(Norway) Per Kristian Bråtveit	Haugesund	12
2	(Norway) André Hansen	Rosenborg	11
3	(Sweden) Andreas Linde	Molde	10
3	(Norway) Sondre Rossbach	Odd	10
5	(Norway) Anders Kristiansen	Sarpsborg 08	9
6	(Iceland) Ingvar Jónsson	Sandefjord	8
6	(Poland) Piotr Leciejewski	Brann	8
8	(Norway) Mathias Dyngeland	Sogndal	6
8	(Norway) Gudmund Kongshavn	Tromsø	6
8	(Republic of Ireland) Sean McDermott	Kristiansund	6
8	(Kenya) Arnold Origi	Lillestrøm	6
8	(Norway) Espen Bugge Pettersen	Strømsgodset	6

=== Discipline ===
==== Player ====
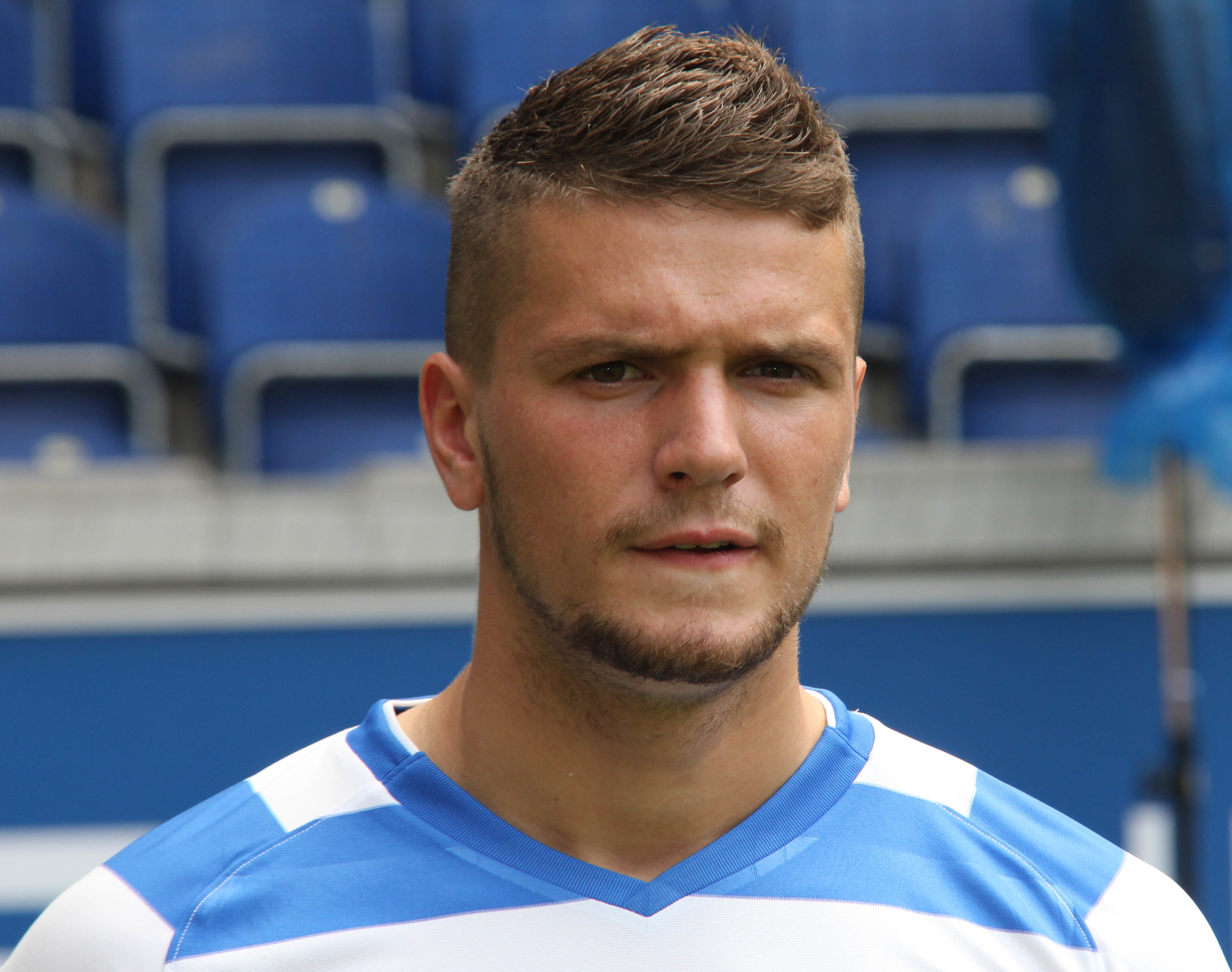
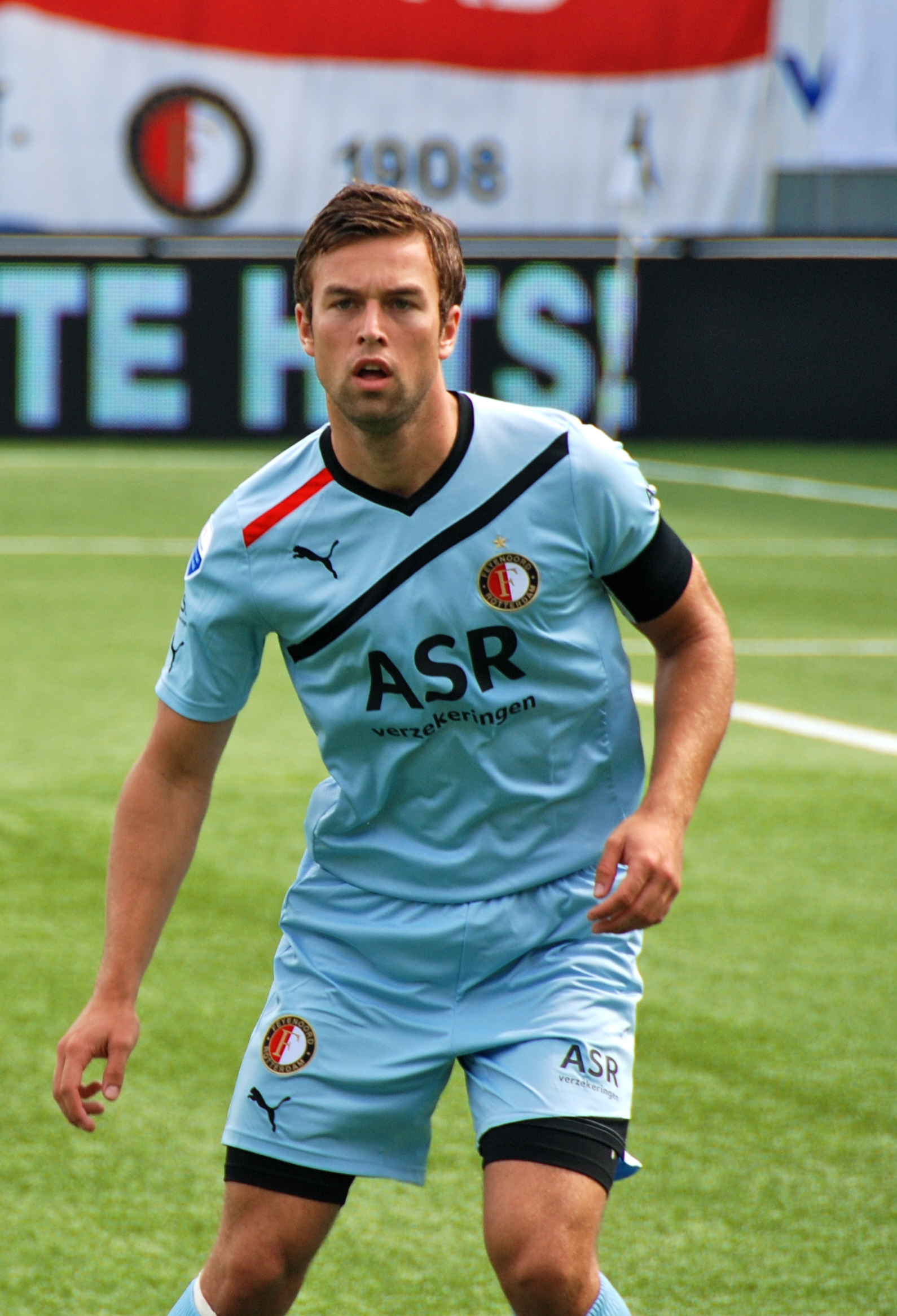
(L–R) Sandfjord's Flamur Kastrati and Aalesund's Kaj Ramsteijn received the most yellow cards over the season with 10 cards each.
- Most yellow cards: 7
  - (Kosovo) Flamur Kastrati (Sandefjord)
  - (Netherlands) Kaj Ramsteijn (Aalesund)
- Most red cards: 2
  - (Denmark) Andreas Albech (Sarpsborg 08)
  - (Senegal) Victor Demba Bindia (Sandefjord)

==== Club ====
- Most yellow cards: 54
  - Sandefjord
- Most red cards: 4
  - Viking

=== Attendances ===
Pos	Team	Total	High	Low	Average	Change
1	Rosenborg	263,892	21,112	15,271	17,593	0.0%
2	Brann	177,881	17,009	8,706	11,859	−4.2%
3	Vålerenga	145,543	17,011	5,844	9,703	+6.9%
4	Molde	116,780	10,720	6,635	7,785	−7.2%
5	Viking	110,705	9,838	6,157	7,380	−16.3%
6	Odd	106,593	9,049	6,164	7,106	−11.6%
7	Strømsgodset	94,078	7,706	5,575	6,272	−8.1%
8	Aalesund	90,937	9,062	5,178	6,062	−4.8%
9	Lillestrøm	84,430	8,552	4,280	5,629	−3.9%
10	Sarpsborg 08	70,519	5,759	4,091	4,701	+21.3%
11	Haugesund	66,827	6,100	3,709	4,455	−14.5%
12	Sandefjord	60,175	6,103	3,034	4,012	+38.1%
13	Stabæk	59,401	4,938	3,310	3,960	+4.0%
14	Kristiansund	57,367	4,126	3,392	3,824	+88.6%
15	Tromsø	53,947	5,445	3,068	3,596	−11.3%
16	Sogndal	48,697	5,600	2,237	3,246	+3.3%
	League total	1,607,772	21,112	2,237	6,699	−3.9%

Updated to games played on 26 November 2017
Source: nifs.no

== Awards ==
Award	Winner	Club
Player of the Year	(Norway) Tore Reginiussen	Rosenborg
Breakthrough of the Year	(Senegal) Krépin Diatta	Sarpsborg 08
Manager of the Year	(Norway) Kåre Ingebrigtsen	Rosenborg
Goal of the Year	(Denmark) Nicklas Bendtner	Rosenborg
