= Sigurd Rosted =

Norwegian footballer (born 1994)

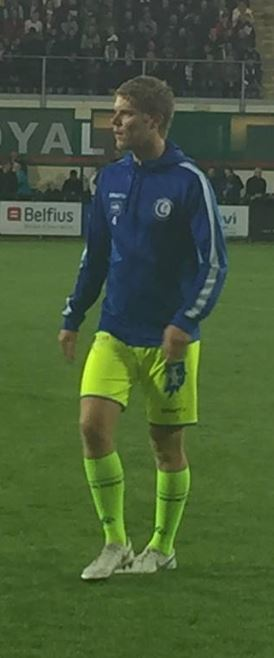
- Rosted warming up for Gent in 2018

Personal information
- Date of birth: 22 July 1994 (age 32)
- Place of birth: Oslo, Norway
- Height: 1.88 m (6 ft 2 in)
- Position: Centre-back

Team information
- Current team: Sarpsborg 08
- Number: 24

Youth career
- Hasle-Løren
- 2010–2012: Kjelsås

Senior career*
| Years | Team | Apps | (Gls) |
| 2012–2014 | Kjelsås | 71 | (9) |
| 2015–2018 | Sarpsborg 08 | 51 | (7) |
| 2018–2019 | Gent | 37 | (5) |
| 2019–2023 | Brøndby | 84 | (5) |
| 2023–2025 | Toronto FC | 77 | (1) |
| 2026– | Sarpsborg 08 | 6 | (0) |

International career^{‡}
| 2016 | Norway U21 | 2 | (0) |
| 2018 | Norway | 5 | (1) |
- * Club domestic league appearances and goals as of 23 July 2026 ‡ National team caps and goals as of 19 November 2018

Sigurd Rosted (Norwegian pronunciation: [ˈrùːstɛt]; born 22 July 1994) is a Norwegian professional footballer who plays as a centre-back for Eliteserien club Sarpsborg 08.

Described as a calm and intelligent centre-back with leading abilities, Rosted began his career in his native Norway and made the move to Belgian Gent in January 2018 before making the move to Brøndby one and a half years later. He won the Danish Superliga with Brøndby in 2021, before joining Major League Soccer side Toronto FC in January 2023.

Rosted was an international for the Norway under-21 team, receiving his only call-up in 2017. His made his first appearance for the Norway senior team in 2018, scoring a goal in a friendly against Albania.

== Club career ==
=== Early career ===
Born in Oslo, Rosted played youth football Hasle-Løren and Kjelsås, before joining Sarpsborg 08 ahead of the 2015 season. Prior to signing, he had been diagnosed with Bekhterev's disease, a type of arthritis mainly affecting his back, but medication allowed him to play professionally. Rosted made his professional debut in September 2015 against Odds BK.

=== Gent ===
On 7 January 2018, Rosted signed a three-and-a-half-year deal with Belgian First Division A side Gent. On 24 January, he made his Gent debut against Royal Antwerp in the First Division A as a substitute in a 1–1 draw away, playing the last 45 minutes in place of Nana Asare. He finished the 2017–18 season with 8 appearances for the club.

The following season Rosted established himself as a starter in the Gent first team, playing 38 matches and scoring 6 goals in all competitions. However, towards the end of the season he saw less playing time, as Timothy Derijck was preferred in the centre of defense.

=== Brøndby ===
On 27 August 2019, Rosted moved to Denmark to join Superliga club Brøndby on a four-year deal for an undisclosed fee, reported to be around €300,000. He made his competitive debut for the club on 1 September, playing 90 minutes as Brøndby lost 1–0 away to FC Midtjylland in the Superliga. Rosted soon found himself as a regular starter in the first team, establishing a partnership in central defense with fellow summer signing, Andreas Maxsø.

Rosted scored his first goal for the club on 7 June 2020 in a 3–2 loss to AC Horsens, a header in the 64th minute. In his first season for Brøndby, he made 26 total appearances in which he scored one goal.

Rosted had a strong start to the 2020–21 season, scoring a last minute winner in a 3–2 home win over Nordsjælland. He continued his form in the derby against Copenhagen, marking the controversial former Brøndby player Kamil Wilczek. Rosted then scored again on 2 October in a 2–1 away win over Randers FC, a 14th minute header after a corner kick provided from Jesper Lindstrøm, as he was voted Man of the Match by fans afterwards. His performances strongly contributed to Brøndby having an undefeated start to the season after four games; the club's best start in the Superliga in 15 years. At the end of the season, Brøndby won their first league title in 16 years after a 2–0 victory against Nordsjælland. Rosted contributed with 25 total appearances that season, scoring three goals.

=== Toronto FC ===
On 31 January 2023, Brøndby IF announced that Rosted had left the club to sign for Major League Soccer club Toronto FC. Toronto FC announced the signing on 7 February, having using Targeted Allocation Money (TAM) for the transfer to sign Rosted to a three-year deal with an option for 2026. He made his debut for the Reds starting in a 3–2 defeat to D.C. United away at Audi Field on 26 February 2023.

On 24 October 2025, the team declined Rosted's contract option.

=== Return to Sarpsborg 08 ===
On 22 January 2026, Rosted signed a three-year contract with Eliteserien club Sarpsborg 08, returning to the club after an eight-year spell abroad.

== International career ==
In 2017, he was called up to the Norway national team for the first time in his career, as a replacement for injured Tore Reginiussen before the friendly match against Sweden on 13 June. He played his first international match on 26 March 2018 in a friendly against Albania, scoring the only goal in a 1–0 win. He had been substituted in for Håvard Nordtveit in the 63rd minute.

== Career statistics ==
=== Club ===
As of match played 18 October 2025

Appearances and goals by club, season and competition
| Club | Season | League | | | National cup | | Continental | | Other | | Total | |
| Club | Season | Division | Apps | Goals | Apps | Goals | Apps | Goals | Apps | Goals | Apps | Goals |
|---|---|---|---|---|---|---|---|---|---|---|---|---|
| Kjelsås | 2012 | Norwegian Second Division | 21 | 2 | 2 | 0 | — | | — | | 23 | 2 |
| Kjelsås | 2013 | Norwegian Second Division | 26 | 2 | 1 | 0 | — | | — | | 27 | 2 |
| Kjelsås | 2014 | Norwegian Second Division | 24 | 5 | 1 | 0 | — | | — | | 25 | 5 |
| Kjelsås | Total | | 71 | 9 | 4 | 0 | — | | — | | 75 | 9 |
| Sarpsborg 08 | 2015 | Eliteserien | 1 | 0 | 0 | 0 | — | | — | | 1 | 0 |
| Sarpsborg 08 | 2016 | Eliteserien | 23 | 3 | 3 | 0 | — | | — | | 26 | 3 |
| Sarpsborg 08 | 2017 | Eliteserien | 27 | 4 | 5 | 0 | — | | — | | 32 | 4 |
| Sarpsborg 08 | Total | | 51 | 7 | 8 | 0 | — | | — | | 59 | 7 |
| Gent | 2017–18 | Belgian Pro League | 8 | 0 | 0 | 0 | — | | — | | 8 | 0 |
| Gent | 2018–19 | Belgian Pro League | 29 | 5 | 3 | 1 | 4 (Note: Appearance(s) in UEFA Europa League) | 0 | — | | 36 | 6 |
| Gent | 2019–20 | Belgian Pro League | 0 | 0 | — | | 1 | 0 | — | | 1 | 0 |
| Gent | Total | | 37 | 5 | 3 | 1 | 5 | 0 | — | | 45 | 6 |
| Brøndby | 2019–20 | Danish Superliga | 25 | 1 | 1 | 0 | — | | — | | 26 | 1 |
| Brøndby | 2020–21 | Danish Superliga | 23 | 3 | 2 | 0 | — | | — | | 25 | 3 |
| Brøndby | 2021–22 | Danish Superliga | 26 | 1 | 3 | 0 | 7 (Note: One appearance in UEFA Champions League, six appearances in UEFA Europa League) | 0 | — | | 36 | 1 |
| Brøndby | 2022–23 | Danish Superliga | 10 | 0 | 1 | 0 | 3 (Note: Appearance(s) in UEFA Europa Conference League) | 0 | — | | 14 | 0 |
| Brøndby | Total | | 84 | 5 | 7 | 0 | 10 | 0 | — | | 101 | 5 |
| Toronto FC | 2023 | Major League Soccer | 21 | 0 | 1 | 0 | — | | 2 (Note: Appearance(s) in Leagues Cup) | 0 | 24 | 0 |
| Toronto FC | 2024 | Major League Soccer | 25 | 0 | 3 | 0 | — | | 1 | 0 | 29 | 0 |
| Toronto FC | 2025 | Major League Soccer | 31 | 1 | 0 | 0 | — | | — | | 31 | 1 |
| Toronto FC | Total | | 77 | 1 | 4 | 0 | — | | 3 | 0 | 84 | 1 |
| Sarpsborg 08 | 2026 | Eliteserien | 0 | 0 | 0 | 0 | — | | — | | 0 | 0 |
| Career total | | | 320 | 27 | 26 | 1 | 15 | 0 | 3 | 0 | 364 | 28 |

=== International ===
Appearances and goals by national team and year
| National team | Year | Apps | Goals |
|---|---|---|---|
| Norway | 2018 | 5 | 0 |
| Total | | 5 | 1 |

Scores and results list Norway's goal tally first, score column indicates score after each Rosted goal.

List of international goals scored by Sigurd Rosted
| No. | Date | Venue | Opponent | Score | Result | Competition |
|---|---|---|---|---|---|---|
| 1 | 26 March 2018 | Elbasan Arena, Elbasan, Albania | Albania | 1–0 | 1–0 | Friendly |

== Honours ==
Brøndby

- Danish Superliga: 2020–21
