= Anders Kristiansen (footballer) =

Norwegian footballer (born 1990)

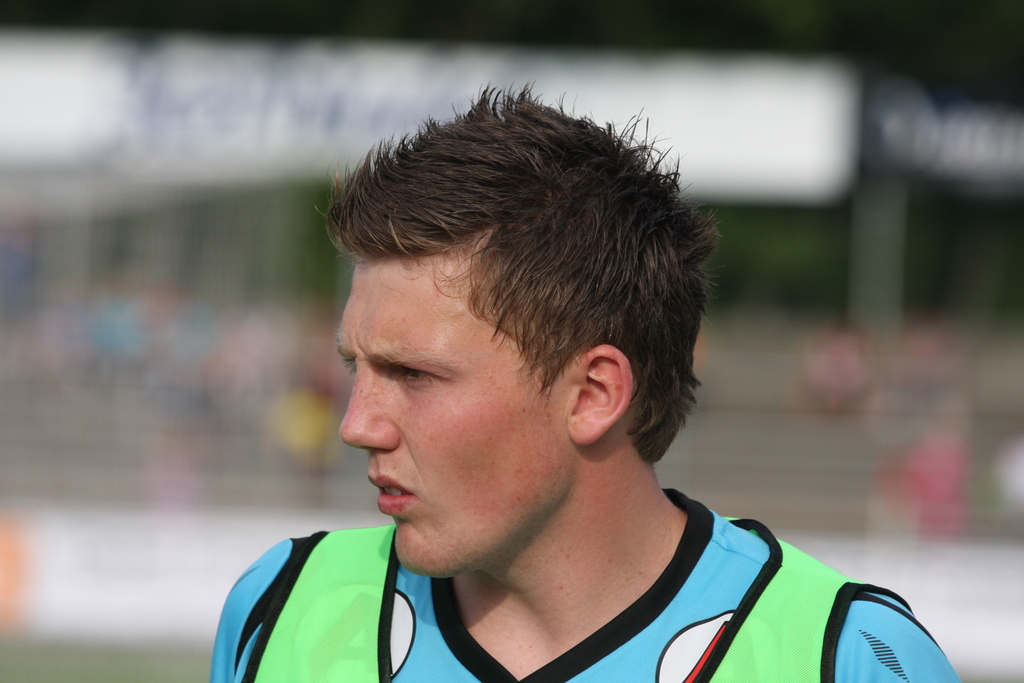
- Kristiansen in 2009

Personal information
- Full name: Anders Kristiansen
- Date of birth: 17 March 1990 (age 36)
- Place of birth: Stavanger, Norway
- Height: 1.83 m (6 ft 0 in)
- Position: Goalkeeper

Youth career
- Øyane IL
- Viking

Senior career*
| Years | Team | Apps | (Gls) |
| 2007–2008 | Viking | 0 | (0) |
| 2008 | → Bryne (loan) | 1 | (0) |
| 2010–2015 | Bryne 2 | 2 | (0) |
| 2009–2015 | Bryne | 164 | (0) |
| 2016–2018 | Sarpsborg 08 2 | 4 | (0) |
| 2016–2018 | Sarpsborg 08 | 47 | (0) |
| 2018–2021 | Union SG | 22 | (0) |
| 2021–2024 | Sarpsborg 08 | 63 | (0) |
| 2024 | → IFK Göteborg (loan) | 1 | (0) |
| Total | | 304 | (0) |

International career
| 2005 | Norway U15 | 3 | (0) |
| 2006 | Norway U16 | 5 | (0) |
| 2007 | Norway U17 | 6 | (0) |
| 2008 | Norway U18 | 2 | (0) |
| 2009 | Norway U19 | 1 | (0) |
| 2011 | Norway U21 | 1 | (0) |
- * Club domestic league appearances and goals

Anders Kristiansen (born 17 March 1990) is a former Norwegian professional footballer who played as a goalkeeper.

== Career statistics ==
=== Club ===
As of match played 13 November 2022

Appearances and goals by club, season and competition
| Club | Season | League | | | National Cup | | Continental | | Total | |
| Club | Season | Division | Apps | Goals | Apps | Goals | Apps | Goals | Apps | Goals |
|---|---|---|---|---|---|---|---|---|---|---|
| Bryne | 2008 | Adeccoligaen | 1 | 0 | 0 | 0 | – | | 1 | 0 |
| Bryne | 2009 | Adeccoligaen | 1 | 0 | 0 | 0 | – | | 1 | 0 |
| Bryne | 2010 | Adeccoligaen | 14 | 0 | 3 | 0 | – | | 17 | 0 |
| Bryne | 2011 | Adeccoligaen | 29 | 0 | 1 | 0 | – | | 30 | 0 |
| Bryne | 2012 | Adeccoligaen | 30 | 0 | 2 | 0 | – | | 32 | 0 |
| Bryne | 2013 | Adeccoligaen | 30 | 0 | 4 | 0 | – | | 34 | 0 |
| Bryne | 2014 | 1. divisjon | 30 | 0 | 2 | 0 | – | | 32 | 0 |
| Bryne | 2015 | OBOS-ligaen | 28 | 0 | 3 | 0 | – | | 31 | 0 |
| Bryne | Total | | 164 | 0 | 15 | 0 | – | – | 179 | 0 |
| Sarpsborg 08 | 2016 | Tippeligaen | 17 | 0 | 1 | 0 | – | | 18 | 0 |
| Sarpsborg 08 | 2017 | Eliteserien | 30 | 0 | 2 | 0 | – | | 32 | 0 |
| Sarpsborg 08 | 2018 | Eliteserien | 0 | 0 | 3 | 0 | – | | 32 | 0 |
| Sarpsborg 08 | Total | | 47 | 0 | 6 | 0 | – | – | 53 | 0 |
| Union SG | 2018–19 | Proximus League | 15 | 0 | 1 | 0 | – | | 16 | 0 |
| Union SG | 2019–20 | Proximus League | 7 | 0 | 3 | 0 | – | | 10 | 0 |
| Union SG | 2020–21 | Proximus League | 0 | 0 | 1 | 0 | – | | 1 | 0 |
| Union SG | Total | | 22 | 0 | 5 | 0 | – | – | 27 | 0 |
| Sarpsborg 08 | 2021 | Eliteserien | 30 | 0 | 1 | 0 | – | | 31 | 0 |
| Sarpsborg 08 | 2022 | Eliteserien | 19 | 0 | 2 | 0 | – | | 21 | 0 |
| Sarpsborg 08 | Total | | 49 | 0 | 3 | 0 | – | – | 52 | 0 |
| Career total | | | 282 | 0 | 29 | 0 | – | – | 311 | 0 |
