= Andreas Albech =

Danish footballer (born 1991)

Personal information
- Full name: Andreas Albech
- Date of birth: 20 October 1991 (age 35)
- Place of birth: Denmark
- Position: Defender

Youth career
- SB 50 Ishøj
- Brøndby

Senior career*
Years	Team	Apps	(Gls)
2011–2012	Greve		
2012–2014	Rishøj		
2014–2016	Skive	32	(2)
2016	Valur	12	(2)
2017	Sarpsborg 08	13	(0)
2018	Vendsyssel	0	(0)
- * Club domestic league appearances and goals as of 7 November 2017

Andreas Albech (born 20 October 1991) is a Danish footballer who played as a right back. He played in Iceland and Norway as well as his native country.

He started playing for SB 50 Ishøj at the age of four. He also played youth football for Brøndby IF, then for Greve, Rishøj and from 2014 Skive. In the autumn of 2014 he damaged a cruciate ligament. Having gone to Iceland to play for Valur in July 2016, where he won the 2016 Icelandic Cup, in the late autumn of 2016 he went on two trials with Eliteserien team Sarpsborg 08. As Sarpsborg 08 chose to sign Albech, the club praised his abilities in passing, crosses and duels as well as Albech's test results in pace and stamina. He would compete with Henri Toivomäki in the right back position, whereas Sarpsborg 08 did not consider youngster Brice Wembangomo as a viable competitor in that position. During the off-season he trained with compatriot Matti Lund Nielsen before official training sessions started.

Sarpsborg 08 finished third in the league and reached the 2017 Norwegian Football Cup final, albeit without Albech appearing in the latter. Sarpsborg 08 regarded Albech's spring season as good, but let him play less often in the autumn. He wanted to try a new club. After the 2017 season he went on trial at Viborg FF before signing with Vendsyssel FF.

He played one season as a full-time professional but did not enjoy it and after suffering a knee injury started working for a bank.
