= 2019 Lillestrøm SK season =

Lillestrøm
2019 season
- Chairman: Per Mathisen
- Manager: Jörgen Lennartsson (until 2 December); Tom Nordlie (interim) (from 3 December)
- Stadium: Åråsen Stadion
- Eliteserien: 14th (Relegated)
- Relegation play-offs: Defeat vs IK Start
- Norwegian Cup: Third Round vs Strømmen
- Top goalscorer: League: Thomas Lehne Olsen (8); All: Thomas Lehne Olsen (10)

The 2018 season was Lillestrøm's 43rd consecutive, and final, year in Eliteserien. Lillestrøm finished the season in 14th position, entering the Relegation play-offs where they were defeated on away goals by IK Start after the two-legged affair ended 5-5. In the Norwegian Cup, Lillestrøm reached the Third Round before defeat to Strømmen.

== Squad ==
As of 24 August 2019

Note: Flags indicate national team as defined under FIFA eligibility rules; some limited exceptions apply. Players may hold more than one non-FIFA nationality.

No.	Pos.	Nation	Player
1	GK	(Croatia) CRO	Marko Marić (on loan from Hoffenheim)
2	DF	(Norway) NOR	Mats Haakenstad
3	DF	(Norway) NOR	Simen Kind Mikalsen
4	DF	(Denmark) DEN	Tobias Salquist
5	DF	(Norway) NOR	Simen Rafn
6	DF	(Estonia) EST	Joonas Tamm (on loan from Flora)
7	MF	(Sweden) SWE	Daniel Gustavsson
8	MF	(Nigeria) NGA	Ifeanyi Mathew
10	FW	(Norway) NOR	Thomas Lehne Olsen
13	DF	(Norway) NOR	Frode Kippe (Captain)
14	MF	(Norway) NOR	Fredrik Krogstad
15	MF	(Norway) NOR	Erik Brenden

No.	Pos.	Nation	Player
17	MF	(Norway) NOR	Kristoffer Ødemarksbakken
18	FW	(Nigeria) NGA	Ebiye Moses
19	MF	(The Gambia) GAM	Sheriff Sinyan
23	MF	(Denmark) DEN	Daniel A. Pedersen (Vice-captain)
27	DF	(Norway) NOR	Josef Baccay
28	MF	(Norway) NOR	Magnus Knudsen
33	MF	(Norway) NOR	Aleksander Melgalvis
40	GK	(Norway) NOR	Mads Christiansen
41	GK	(Norway) NOR	Vegard Storsve
42	DF	(Norway) NOR	Philip Slørdahl
88	FW	(Iceland) ISL	Arnór Smárason (3rd captain)

=== Out on loan ===
Note: Flags indicate national team as defined under FIFA eligibility rules; some limited exceptions apply. Players may hold more than one non-FIFA nationality.

No.	Pos.	Nation	Player
21	FW	(Norway) NOR	Petter Mathias Olsen (at Ham-Kam)
24	DF	(Norway) NOR	Erik Sandberg (at Skeid)
25	GK	(Estonia) EST	Matvei Igonen (at Flora)

No.	Pos.	Nation	Player
26	DF	(Norway) NOR	Lars Ranger (at Ull/Kisa)
29	GK	(Norway) NOR	Emil Ødegaard (at Grorud IL)
—	MF	(Nigeria) NGA	Charles Ezeh (at Skeid)

== Transfers ==
=== Winter ===
In: Note: Flags indicate national team as defined under FIFA eligibility rules; some limited exceptions apply. Players may hold more than one non-FIFA nationality.

No.	Pos.	Nation	Player
4	DF	(Denmark) DEN	Tobias Salquist (from (Belgium) Waasland-Beveren)
7	MF	(Sweden) SWE	Daniel Gustavsson (from (Sweden) Elfsborg)
18	MF	(Nigeria) NGA	Moses Ebiye (loan return from (Norway) Strømmen)
21	MF	(Montserrat) MSR	Alex Dyer (on loan from (Sweden) Elfsborg)
27	DF	(Norway) NOR	Josef Baccay (promoted from junior squad)
42	DF	(Norway) NOR	Philip Slørdahl (promoted from junior squad)

Out: Note: Flags indicate national team as defined under FIFA eligibility rules; some limited exceptions apply. Players may hold more than one non-FIFA nationality.

No.	Pos.	Nation	Player
4	DF	(Norway) NOR	Marius Amundsen (released)
6	MF	(Nigeria) NGA	Ifeanyi Mathew (on loan to (Turkey) Osmanlıspor)
8	MF	(Nigeria) NGA	Charles Ezeh (on loan to (Norway) Hamkam, previously on loan to (Norway) Strømmen)
9	FW	(England) ENG	Gary Martin (to (Iceland) Valur)
11	FW	(Norway) NOR	Erling Knudtzon (to (Norway) Molde)
22	DF	(Serbia) SRB	Stefan Antonijevic (to (Norway) Sogndal)
21	MF	(Norway) NOR	Petter Mathias Olsen (on loan to (Norway) Hamkam, previously on loan to (Norway) Strømmen)
26	DF	(Norway) NOR	Lars Ranger (on loan to (Norway) Ull/Kisa)
—	DF	(Sweden) SWE	Martin Falkeborn (to (Sweden) Syrianska, previously on loan to (Sweden) Frej)
—	FW	(Norway) NOR	Tobias Gran (to (Norway) FK Tønsberg, previously on loan to HamKam)

=== Summer ===
In: Note: Flags indicate national team as defined under FIFA eligibility rules; some limited exceptions apply. Players may hold more than one non-FIFA nationality.

No.	Pos.	Nation	Player
6	DF	(Estonia) EST	Joonas Tamm (on loan from (Estonia) Flora Tallinn)
8	MF	(Nigeria) NGA	Ifeanyi Mathew (loan return from (Turkey) Osmanlispor)

Out: Note: Flags indicate national team as defined under FIFA eligibility rules; some limited exceptions apply. Players may hold more than one non-FIFA nationality.

No.	Pos.	Nation	Player
12	MF	(Nigeria) NGA	Raphael Ayagwa (released)
21	MF	(Montserrat) MSR	Alex Dyer (loan return to (Sweden) Elfsborg)
24	DF	(Norway) NOR	Erik Tobias Sandberg (on loan to (Norway) Skeid)
25	GK	(Estonia) EST	Matvei Igonen (on loan to (Estonia) Flora Tallinn)
—	MF	(Nigeria) NGA	Charles Ezeh (on loan to (Norway) Skeid, previously on loan to (Norway) Hamkam)
—	MF	(Norway) NOR	Petter Mathias Olsen (on loan to (Norway) Grorud, previously on loan to (Norway) Hamkam)

== Competitions ==
=== Eliteserien ===
==== Results summary ====
Overall								Home						Away					
Pld	W	D	L	GF	GA	GD	Pts	W	D	L	GF	GA	GD	W	D	L	GF	GA	GD
30	7	9	14	32	47	−15	30	5	5	5	16	19	−3	2	4	9	16	28	−12

Last updated: 1 December 2019.
Source: see below

==== Results by round ====
Round	1	2	3	4	5	6	7	8	9	10	11	12	13	14	15	16	17	18	19	20	21	22	23	24	25	26	27	28	29	30
Ground	A	H	A	H	H	A	H	A	H	A	H	A	H	A	H	A	H	A	A	H	A	H	A	H	A	H	A	H	A	H
Result	D	W	L	L	W	L	D	D	L	W	L	L	W	L	W	L	W	D	W	L	L	D	L	D	D	D	L	L	L	D
Position	7	6	9	10	9	12	10	10	13	10	11	12	10	13	10	10	10	10	9	10	10	10	10	10	11	11	11	11	13	14

Updated to match(es) played on 1 December 2019. Source: see below
A = Away; H = Home; W = Win; D = Draw; L = Loss

==== Results ====
1 April 2019 1	Stabæk	1–1	Lillestrøm	Bærum
19:00 CEST (UTC+2)	Boli 45+1'	Report	Olsen 45' (penalty missed) 52'	Stadium: Nadderud Stadion; Attendance: 4,031; Referee: Svein Oddvar Moen

7 April 2019 2	Lillestrøm	2–1	Ranheim	Lillestrøm
18:00 CEST (UTC+2)	Olsen 15', 61'	Report	Dønnem 50'; Alseth (yellow card) 85'	Stadium: Åråsen Stadion; Attendance: 5,829; Referee: Tore Hansen

14 April 2019 3	Sarpsborg 08	1–0	Lillestrøm	Sarpsborg
18:00 CEST (UTC+2)	J.Larsen 11' (yellow card) 89'; Skålevik (yellow card) 34'; Thomassen (yellow card) 85'	Report	Kippe (yellow card) 29'; Rafn (yellow card) 42'	Stadium: Sarpsborg Stadion; Attendance: 5,567; Referee: Espen Eskås

22 April 2019 4	Lillestrøm	0–2	Molde	Lillestrøm
18:00 CEST (UTC+2)		Report	Eikrem 75'; Knudtzon 85'	Stadium: Åråsen Stadion; Attendance: 5,248; Referee: Svein Oddvar Moen

28 April 2019 5	Lillestrøm	1–0	Haugesund	Lillestrøm
18:00 CEST (UTC+2)	Ødemarksbakken 76'	Report		Stadium: Åråsen Stadion; Attendance: 4,828; Referee: Ola Hobber Nilsen

5 May 2019 6	Bodø/Glimt	4–0	Lillestrøm	Bodø
18:00 CEST (UTC+2)	Layoni 14', 44', 52'; Herrem 33'; J.Hauge (yellow card) 77'	Report	Olsen (yellow card) 40'; Kippe (yellow card) 63'	Stadium: Aspmyra Stadion; Attendance: 2,789; Referee: Sigurd Smehus Kringstad

11 May 2019 7	Lillestrøm	1–1	Rosenborg	Lillestrøm
18:00 CEST (UTC+2)	Gustavsson 23'; Sinyan (yellow card) 84'	Report	Jensen 62'; Adegbenro (yellow card) 70'	Stadium: Åråsen Stadion; Attendance: 8,839; Referee: Rohit Saggi

16 May 2019 8	Mjøndalen	2–2	Lillestrøm	Mjøndalen
18:45 CEST (UTC+2)	Johansen 33' (yellow card) 58'; Brochmann 45+2' (yellow card) 90+1'; Brustad (yellow card) 63'	Report	Salquist 60'; Olsen 78'	Stadium: Consto Arena; Attendance: 2,380; Referee: Kristoffer Hagenes

19 May 2019 9	Lillestrøm	0–3	Odd	Lillestrøm
18:00 CEST (UTC+2)	Smárason (yellow card) 54'	Report	Børven 2' (pen.); Hagen 47'; Pedersen 66' (o.g.)	Stadium: Åråsen Stadion; Attendance: 4,439; Referee: Tore Hansen

25 May 2019 10	Vålerenga	0–3	Lillestrøm	Oslo
18:00 CEST (UTC+2)	Ejuke (yellow card) 30'; Azemi (yellow card) 49' (yellow-red card) 79'; Juárez (yellow card) 61'	Report	Pedersen (yellow card) 12'; Olsen 15', 62'; Salquist 69'	Stadium: Intility Arena; Attendance: 14,418; Referee: Svein Oddvar Moen

16 June 2019 11	Lillestrøm	0–2	Viking	Lillestrøm
18:00 CEST (UTC+2)	Sinyan (red card) 13'; Melgalvis (yellow card) 24'	Report	Ibrahimaj (yellow card) 24'; Thorstvedt 44'; Hove (yellow card) 70'; Vevatne 78'	Stadium: Åråsen Stadion; Attendance: 5,676; Referee: Dag Vidar Hafsås

23 June 2019 12	Brann	1–0	Lillestrøm	Bergen
20:00 CEST (UTC+2)	Koomson 73'	Report	Pedersen (yellow card) 51'	Stadium: Brann Stadion; Attendance: 9,523; Referee: Rohit Saggi

30 June 2019 13	Lillestrøm	4–0	Tromsø	Lillestrøm
18:00 CEST (UTC+2)	Salquist 15'; Melgalvis 23' (yellow card) 64'; Gustavsson (yellow card) 48' (goal) 65'; Krogstad (yellow card) 67'; Ødemarksbakken 78'	Report	Berntsen (yellow card) 66'	Stadium: Åråsen Stadion; Attendance: 5,108; Referee: Espen Eskås

5 July 2019 14	Kristiansund	5–2	Lillestrøm	Kristiansund
19:00 CEST (UTC+2)	Kalludra 6'; Psyché 23', 90+6'; Bye 35'; Kastrati 60'; Diop (yellow card) 70'; McDermott (yellow card) 76'; Coly (yellow card) 79'; Amang (yellow card) 90+1'	Report	Melgalvis 40'; Ebiye 73'; Ødemarksbakken (yellow card) 79'; Slørdahl (yellow card) 90'; Kippe (yellow card) 90+5'	Stadium: Kristiansund Stadion; Attendance: 4,316; Referee: Kai Erik Steen

14 July 2019 15	Lillestrøm	2–1	Strømsgodset	Lillestrøm
20:00 CEST (UTC+2)	Smárason 42', 45+2'; Dyer (yellow card) 86'	Report	Tokstad 73' (yellow card) 81'	Stadium: Åråsen Stadion; Attendance: 4,337; Referee: Svein Oddvar Moen

3 August 2019 16	Odd	2–1	Lillestrøm	Skien
18:00 CEST (UTC+2)	Rashani 64'; Børven 81'; Ruud (yellow card) 90+4'	Report	Ødemarksbakken 52'	Stadium: Skagerak Arena; Attendance: 4,720; Referee: Kristoffer Hagenes

12 August 2019 17	Lillestrøm	3–2	Mjøndalen	Lillestrøm
19:00 CEST (UTC+2)	Smárason 13' (pen.); Mikalsen 36'; Solberg 48' (o.g.)	Report	Occéan 10', 70'; Solberg (yellow card) 29'; Silfwer (yellow card) 43'; Aasmundsen (yellow card) 87'	Stadium: Åråsen Stadion; Attendance: 5,544; Referee: Trygve Kjensli

18 August 2019 18	Tromsø	1–1	Lillestrøm	Tromsø
18:00 CEST (UTC+2)	Wangberg (yellow card) 10' (goal) 78'; Taylor (yellow card) 74'	Report	Smárason 11' (pen.); Krogstad (yellow card) 23'; Salquist (yellow card) 59'; Ødemarksbakken (yellow card) 79'	Stadium: Alfheim Stadion; Attendance: 3,409; Referee: Rohit Saggi

25 August 2019 19	Haugesund	0–2	Lillestrøm	Haugesund
18:00 CEST (UTC+2)	Koné (yellow card) 46'	Report	Ødemarksbakken (yellow card) 21'; Salquist (yellow card) 35'; Olsen 64'; Haakenstad 87'; Brenden (yellow card) 90+1'	Stadium: Haugesund Stadion; Attendance: 4,045; Referee: Ola Hobber Nilsen

1 September 2019 20	Lillestrøm	1–3	Brann	Lillestrøm
18:00 CEST (UTC+2)	Rafn 22'; Marić (yellow card) 42'; Olsen (yellow card) 53'; Mikalsen (yellow card) 74'; Smárason (yellow card) 87'	Report	Strand 13'; Jenssen 34'; Rólantsson 50'; Kristiansen (yellow card) 88'; Wormgoor (yellow card) 90+4'	Stadium: Åråsen Stadion; Attendance: 6,771; Referee: Svein Oddvar Moen

14 September 2019 21	Rosenborg	3–1	Lillestrøm	Trondheim
18:00 CEST (UTC+2)	Maars Johnsen (yellow card) 1' (goal) 25', 59'; Adegbenro 53'	Report	Mathew (yellow card) 24'; Pedersen 65'; Krogstad (yellow card) 67'; Salquist (yellow card) 84'	Stadium: Lerkendal Stadion; Attendance: 12,183; Referee: Espen Eskås

22 September 2019 22	Lillestrøm	1–1	Kristiansund	Lillestrøm
18:00 CEST (UTC+2)	Tamm (yellow card) 5'; Marić (yellow card) 24'; Psyché 44' (o.g.)	Report	Kastrati (penalty missed) 24' (yellow card) 49'; Pellegrino 47'	Stadium: Åråsen Stadion; Attendance: 5,117; Referee: Tore Hansen

29 September 2019 23	Molde	2–1	Lillestrøm	Molde
18:00 CEST (UTC+2)	E.Hestad (yellow card) 51'; James 64'; Salquist 90+4' (o.g.)	Report	Krogstad 37' (pen.); Ødemarksbakken (yellow card) 41'	Stadium: Aker Stadion; Attendance: 6,626; Referee: Rohit Saggi

6 October 2019 24	Lillestrøm	0–0	Bodø/Glimt	Lillestrøm
18:00 CEST (UTC+2)	Melgalvis (yellow card) 21'	Report		Stadium: Åråsen Stadion; Attendance: 5,305; Referee: Trygve Kjensli

20 October 2019 25	Strømsgodset	1–1	Lillestrøm	Drammen
18:00 CEST (UTC+2)	Mawa 46'	Report	Tamm (yellow card) 22'; Olsen 71'	Stadium: Marienlyst Stadion; Attendance: 5,604; Referee: Tore Hansen

26 October 2019 26	Lillestrøm	0–0	Vålerenga	Lillestrøm
16:00 CEST (UTC+2)		Report	Borchgrevink (yellow card) 74'	Stadium: Åråsen Stadion; Attendance: 9,884; Referee: Tommy Skjerven

3 November 2019 27	Viking	3–0	Lillestrøm	Stavanger
18:00 CET (UTC+1)	Ibrahimaj 14'; Torsteinbø 39'; Hove (yellow card) 58'; Tripić 66' (pen.)	Report	Salquist (yellow card) 65'; Mathew (yellow card) 71'	Stadium: Viking Stadion; Attendance: 7,037; Referee: Kristoffer Hagenes

10 November 2019 28	Lillestrøm	1–3	Stabæk	Lillestrøm
18:00 CET (UTC+1)	Tamm (yellow card) 1'; Marić (yellow card) 48'; Melgalvis 90+1'	Report	Brynhildsen 24'; Edvardsen 26'; Bohinen (penalty missed) 48'; Junker 64'	Stadium: Åråsen Stadion; Attendance: 4,650; Referee: Kai Erik Steen

24 November 2019 29	Ranheim	2–1	Lillestrøm	Trondheim
18:00 CET (UTC+1)	Erlien (yellow card) 27'; Mateo 61'; Reginiussen 69'	Report	Mikalsen (yellow card) 41'; Pedersen 50' (pen.)	Stadium: Extra Arena; Attendance: 1,708; Referee: Tom Harald Hagen

1 December 2019 30	Lillestrøm	0–0	Sarpsborg 08	Lillestrøm
18:00 CET (UTC+1)	Rafn (yellow card) 20'; Salquist (yellow card) 89'	Report	Zachariassen (yellow card) 39'; Ødegaard (yellow card) 47'	Stadium: Åråsen Stadion; Attendance: 5,293; Referee: Svein Oddvar Moen

==== Table ====
Pos	Team	Pld	W	D	L	GF	GA	GD	Pts	Qualification or relegation
12	Sarpsborg 08	30	5	15	10	30	40	−10	30	
13	Mjøndalen	30	6	12	12	38	52	−14	30	
14	Lillestrøm (R)	30	7	9	14	32	47	−15	30	Qualification for the relegation play-offs
15	Tromsø (R)	30	8	6	16	39	58	−19	30	Relegation to First Division
16	Ranheim (R)	30	7	6	17	36	55	−19	27	Relegation to First Division

Source: Football Association of Norway (in Norwegian), Soccerway
Rules for classification: 1) Points; 2) Goal difference; 3) Goals scored; 4) Head-to-head points; 5) Head-to-head goal difference; 6) Head-to-head away goals scored (only if between two teams); 7) Head-to-head goals scored; 8) Play-off (only used to decide champions or relegation).
(R) Relegated

==== Relegation play-offs ====
7 December 2019 1st leg	Start	2–1	Lillestrøm	Kristiansand
18:00 CEST (UTC+2)	Sigurðarson 54' (pen.), 69' (yellow card) 74'	Report	Gustavsson 28'; Mathew (yellow card) 89'; Melgalvis (yellow card) 90+5'	Stadium: Sør Arena; Attendance: 4,013; Referee: Trygve Kjensli

11 December 2019 2nd leg	Lillestrøm	4–3 (5–5(a) agg.)	Start	Lillestrøm
19:00 CEST (UTC+2)	Mikalsen 2' (yellow card) 88'; Melgalvis (yellow card) 12'; Lowe 22' (o.g.); Gustavsson 49'; Melgalvis 61'; Salquist (yellow card) 84'	Report	Wichne (yellow card) 30'; Lowe (yellow card) 45'; Ramsland 76', 79', 82' (yellow card) 84'; Sigurðarson (yellow card) 86'	Stadium: Åråsen Stadion; Attendance: 7,892; Referee: Ola Hobber Nilsen

=== Norwegian Cup ===
1 May 2019 First Round	Gjelleråsen	1–3	Lillestrøm	Nittedal
18:00 CEST (UTC+2)	T.Normann (yellow card) 66'; M.Kaasa (yellow card) 88'; W.Lloyd 90+1'; E.Steine (yellow card) 90+4'	Report	Salquist (red card) 25'; Lehne Olsen 77'; Gustavsson 90'; Dyer 90+3' (pen.)	Stadium: Li Kunstgress; Attendance: 1,547; Referee: Ajdin Medic

22 May 2019 Second Round	Kvik Halden	1–4	Lillestrøm	Halden
18:00 CEST (UTC+2)	C.Agu (yellow card) 66'; D.Hasanagic 86'	Report	Lehne Olsen 9'; Dyer (yellow card) 21'; Pedersen 38'; Gustavsson 66', 73'	Stadium: Halden Stadion; Attendance: 1,014; Referee: Ole-Alexander Ekeli Valen

19 June 2019 Third Round	Strømmen	1–0	Lillestrøm	Strømmen
18:00 CEST (UTC+2)	Stenseth Gussiås 52'; Bjørkkjær (yellow card) 86'	Report	Dyer (yellow card) 59'; Smárason (yellow card) 90+3'	Stadium: Strømmen Stadion; Attendance: 1,235; Referee: Ola Hobber Nilsen

== Squad statistics ==
As of match played 11 December 2019

=== Appearances and goals ===
No.	Pos	Nat	Player	Total		Eliteserien		Norwegian Cup		Relegation play-offs	
No.	Pos	Nat	Player	Apps	Goals	Apps	Goals	Apps	Goals	Apps	Goals
1	GK	(Croatia) CRO	Marko Marić	34	0	30	0	2	0	2	0
2	DF	(Norway) NOR	Mats Haakenstad	22	1	13+6	1	1+2	0	0	0
3	DF	(Norway) NOR	Simen Kind Mikalsen	18	2	15+1	1	0	0	2	1
4	DF	(Denmark) DEN	Tobias Salquist	29	3	25	3	2	0	2	0
5	DF	(Norway) NOR	Simen Rafn	35	1	29+1	1	3	0	2	0
6	DF	(Estonia) EST	Joonas Tamm	16	0	15	0	0	0	1	0
7	MF	(Sweden) SWE	Daniel Gustavsson	30	7	23+2	2	3	3	2	2
8	MF	(Nigeria) NGA	Ifeanyi Mathew	13	0	11	0	0	0	2	0
10	FW	(Norway) NOR	Thomas Lehne Olsen	30	10	25+1	8	1+1	2	2	0
13	DF	(Norway) NOR	Frode Kippe	17	0	13+3	0	0	0	0+1	0
14	MF	(Norway) NOR	Fredrik Krogstad	31	1	21+6	1	2	0	2	0
15	MF	(Norway) NOR	Erik Brenden	22	0	3+15	0	2+1	0	0+1	0
17	MF	(Norway) NOR	Kristoffer Ødemarksbakken	32	3	24+5	3	1+1	0	1	0
18	MF	(Nigeria) NGA	Moses Ebiye	14	1	3+9	1	1+1	0	0	0
19	DF	(The Gambia) GAM	Sheriff Sinyan	24	0	10+9	0	3	0	1+1	0
23	MF	(Denmark) DEN	Daniel Pedersen	28	3	23+1	2	2	1	2	0
27	DF	(Norway) NOR	Josef Baccay	8	0	4+2	0	2	0	0	0
28	MF	(Norway) NOR	Magnus Knudsen	3	0	0+1	0	0+2	0	0	0
33	MF	(Norway) NOR	Aleksander Melgalvis	31	4	18+8	3	3	0	1+1	1
42	DF	(Norway) NOR	Philip Slørdahl	2	0	1	0	1	0	0	0
88	MF	(Iceland) ISL	Arnór Smárason	25	4	16+7	4	0+1	0	0+1	0
Players away from Lillestrøm on loan:
25	GK	(Estonia) EST	Matvei Igonen	1	0	0	0	1	0	0	0
Players who left Lillestrøm during the season:
12	MF	(Nigeria) NGA	Raphael Ayagwa	1	0	0+1	0	0	0	0	0
21	MF	(Montserrat) MSR	Alex Dyer	14	1	8+3	0	3	1	0	0

=== Goal scorers ===
Place	Position	Nation	Number	Name	Eliteserien	Norwegian Cup	Relegation play-offs	Total
1	FW	(Norway)	10	Thomas Lehne Olsen	8	2	0	10
2	MF	(Sweden)	7	Daniel Gustavsson	2	3	2	7
3	MF	(Iceland)	88	Arnór Smárason	4	0	0	4
3	MF	(Norway)	33	Aleksander Melgalvis	3	0	1	4
5	DF	(Denmark)	4	Tobias Salquist	3	0	0	3
5	MF	(Norway)	17	Kristoffer Ødemarksbakken	3	0	0	3
5	MF	(Denmark)	23	Daniel Pedersen	2	1	0	3
5				Own goal	2	0	1	3
9	DF	(Norway)	3	Simen Kind Mikalsen	1	0	1	2
10	DF	(Norway)	2	Mats Haakenstad	1	0	0	1
10	DF	(Norway)	5	Simen Rafn	1	0	0	1
10	MF	(Norway)	14	Fredrik Krogstad	1	0	0	1
10	MF	(Nigeria)	18	Moses Ebiye	1	0	0	1
10	MF	(Montserrat)	21	Alex Dyer	0	1	0	1
				TOTALS	32	7	5	44

=== Clean sheets ===
Place	Position	Nation	Number	Name	Eliteserien	Norwegian Cup	Relegation play-offs	Total
1	GK	(Croatia)	1	Marko Marić	7	0	0	7
				TOTALS	7	0	0	7

=== Disciplinary record ===
Number	Nation	Position	Name	Eliteserien		Norwegian Cup		Relegation play-offs		Total	
Number	Nation	Position	Name	Booked	Sent off (straight red)	Booked	Sent off (straight red)	Booked	Sent off (straight red)	Booked	Sent off (straight red)
1	(Croatia)	GK	Marko Marić	3	0	0	0	0	0	3	0
3	(Norway)	DF	Simen Kind Mikalsen	2	0	0	0	1	0	3	0
4	(Denmark)	DF	Tobias Salquist	5	0	0	0	1	0	6	0
5	(Norway)	DF	Simen Rafn	2	0	0	0	0	0	2	0
6	(Estonia)	DF	Joonas Tamm	3	0	0	0	0	0	3	0
7	(Sweden)	MF	Daniel Gustavsson	1	0	0	0	0	0	1	0
8	(Nigeria)	MF	Ifeanyi Mathew	2	0	0	0	1	0	3	0
10	(Norway)	FW	Thomas Lehne Olsen	2	0	0	0	0	0	2	0
13	(Norway)	DF	Frode Kippe	3	0	0	0	0	0	3	0
14	(Norway)	MF	Fredrik Krogstad	3	0	0	0	0	0	3	0
15	(Norway)	MF	Erik Brenden	1	0	0	0	0	0	1	0
17	(Norway)	MF	Kristoffer Ødemarksbakken	4	0	0	0	0	0	4	0
19	(The Gambia)	DF	Sheriff Sinyan	1	1	0	0	0	0	1	1
23	(Denmark)	MF	Daniel Pedersen	2	0	0	0	0	0	2	0
33	(Norway)	MF	Aleksander Melgalvis	3	0	0	0	2	0	5	0
42	(Norway)	DF	Philip Slørdahl	1	0	0	0	0	0	1	0
88	(Iceland)	MF	Arnór Smárason	2	0	1	0	0	0	3	0
Players who left Lillestrøm during the season:
21	(Montserrat)	MF	Alex Dyer	1	0	2	0	0	0	3	0
			TOTALS	41	1	3	0	5	0	49	1
