= 2018 Lillestrøm SK season =

Lillestrøm
2018 season
- Chairman: Per Mathisen
- Manager: Arne Erlandsen (Until 26 June); Arild Sundgot (intermin) (26 June - 13 July); Jörgen Lennartsson (From 13 July)
- Stadium: Åråsen Stadion
- Eliteserien: 12th
- Norwegian Cup: Semifinal vs Strømsgodset
- UEFA Europa League: 2nd Qualifying Round vs LASK
- Top goalscorer: League: Thomas Lehne Olsen (12); All: Thomas Lehne Olsen (17)

The 2018 season was Lillestrøm's 42nd consecutive year in Eliteserien.

== Season events ==
On 26 June, Arne Erlandsen was sacked as the club manager, with Arild Sundgot being appointed as an interim manager. On 13 July, Jörgen Lennartsson was appointed the club's new manager.

== Squad ==
As of 16 August 2018

Note: Flags indicate national team as defined under FIFA eligibility rules; some limited exceptions apply. Players may hold more than one non-FIFA nationality.

No.	Pos.	Nation	Player
1	GK	CRO	Marko Marić (on loan from Hoffenheim)
2	DF	NOR	Mats Haakenstad
3	DF	NOR	Simen Kind Mikalsen
4	DF	NOR	Marius Amundsen
5	DF	NOR	Simen Rafn
6	MF	NGR	Ifeanyi Mathew
9	FW	ENG	Gary Martin
10	FW	NOR	Thomas Lehne Olsen
11	FW	NOR	Erling Knudtzon
12	MF	NGR	Raphael Ayagwa
13	DF	NOR	Frode Kippe (Captain)

No.	Pos.	Nation	Player
14	MF	NOR	Fredrik Krogstad
15	MF	NOR	Erik Brenden
17	MF	NOR	Kristoffer Ødemarksbakken
19	MF	NOR	Sheriff Sinyan
22	DF	SRB	Stefan Antonijevic
23	MF	DEN	Daniel A. Pedersen
24	DF	NOR	Erik Sandberg
25	GK	EST	Matvei Igonen
33	MF	NOR	Aleksander Melgalvis
88	MF	ISL	Arnór Smárason

=== Out on loan ===
Note: Flags indicate national team as defined under FIFA eligibility rules; some limited exceptions apply. Players may hold more than one non-FIFA nationality.

No.	Pos.	Nation	Player
7	MF	NGR	Moses Ebiye (at Strømmen)
8	MF	NGR	Charles Ezeh (at Strømmen)
16	FW	NOR	Tobias Gran (at HamKam)

No.	Pos.	Nation	Player
21	FW	NOR	Petter Mathias Olsen (at Strømmen IF)
29	GK	NOR	Emil Ødegaard (at Grorud IL)
—	DF	SWE	Martin Falkeborn (at IK Frej)

== Transfers ==
=== Winter ===
In: Note: Flags indicate national team as defined under FIFA eligibility rules; some limited exceptions apply. Players may hold more than one non-FIFA nationality.

No.	Pos.	Nation	Player
9	FW	ENG	Gary Martin (from (Belgium) Lokeren)
10	FW	NOR	Thomas Lehne Olsen (from (Norway) Tromsø)
17	MF	NOR	Kristoffer Ødemarksbakken (from (Norway) Ull/Kisa)
25	GK	EST	Matvei Igonen (from (Estonia) FCI Tallinn)

Out: Note: Flags indicate national team as defined under FIFA eligibility rules; some limited exceptions apply. Players may hold more than one non-FIFA nationality.

No.	Pos.	Nation	Player
10	FW	NGR	Marco Tagbajumi (loan return to (Norway) Strømsgodset)
17	MF	NOR	Jørgen Kolstad (to (Norway) Kongsvinger, previously on loan)
21	FW	NOR	Petter Mathias Olsen (on loan to (Norway) Strømmen)
23	MF	BUL	Chigozie Udoji (to (Greece) Platanias)
28	MF	NOR	Henrik Loholt Kristiansen (to (Norway) Ullensaker/Kisa)
29	GK	NOR	Emil Ødegaard (on loan to (Norway) Grorud, previously on loan at (Norway) Levanger)
77	GK	KEN	Arnold Origi
—	DF	SWE	Martin Falkeborn (on loan to (Sweden) Frej)

=== Summer ===
In: Note: Flags indicate national team as defined under FIFA eligibility rules; some limited exceptions apply. Players may hold more than one non-FIFA nationality.

No.	Pos.	Nation	Player
12	MF	NGR	Raphael Ayagwa (from (Nigeria) Plateau United)
23	MF	DEN	Daniel A. Pedersen (from (Denmark) AGF Aarhus)
88	MF	ISL	Arnór Smárason (from (Sweden) Hammarby)

Out: Note: Flags indicate national team as defined under FIFA eligibility rules; some limited exceptions apply. Players may hold more than one non-FIFA nationality.

No.	Pos.	Nation	Player
7	MF	NGR	Ebiye Moses (on loan to (Norway) Strømmen)
8	MF	NGR	Charles Ezeh (on loan to (Norway) Strømmen)
16	FW	NOR	Tobias Gran (on loan to (Norway) HamKam)

== Competitions ==
=== Mesterfinalen ===
26 April 2018	Lillestrøm	0–1	Rosenborg	Lillestrøm
18:30 CEST (UTC+2)		Report	Bendtner 52'; Zekhnini (yellow card) 63'; Šerbečić (yellow card) 81'	Stadium: Åråsen Stadion; Attendance: 4,295; Referee: Tom Harald Hagen

=== Eliteserien ===
==== Results summary ====
Overall								Home						Away					
Pld	W	D	L	GF	GA	GD	Pts	W	D	L	GF	GA	GD	W	D	L	GF	GA	GD
30	7	11	12	34	44	−10	32	5	8	2	16	12	+4	2	3	10	18	32	−14

Last updated: 24 November 2018.
Source: see below

==== Results by round ====
Round	1	2	3	4	5	6	7	8	9	10	11	12	13	14	15	16	17	18	19	20	21	22	23	24	25	26	27	28	29	30
Ground	A	H	A	H	A	H	A	H	A	A	H	A	H	A	H	A	H	A	H	A	H	A	H	H	A	H	A	H	A	H
Result	L	D	L	W	L	L	L	W	W	L	D	L	D	D	D	L	D	L	D	W	L	L	W	W	D	D	L	D	D	W
Position	14	12	14	10	12	13	15	12	11	11	11	13	13	13	13	13	13	13	14	13	13	15	15	13	13	13	14	14	13	12

Updated to match(es) played on 24 November 2018. Source: see below
A = Away; H = Home; W = Win; D = Draw; L = Loss

==== Results ====
11 March 2018 1	Bodø/Glimt	3–1	Lillestrøm	Bodø
18:00 CET (UTC+1)	Opseth 22', 87'; José Ángel (yellow card) 66'; Moe 81'	Report	Olsen 46'; Kippe (yellow card) 60'	Stadium: Aspmyra Stadion; Attendance: 3,484; Referee: Kristoffer Hagenes

17 March 2018 2	Lillestrøm	2–2	Sarpsborg 08	Lillestrøm
15:30 CEST (UTC+2)	Ødemarksbakken 15'; Mathew (yellow card) 52'; Melgalvis 72'	Report	Tamm 27'; Schwartz 54'; Thomassen (yellow card) 76'	Stadium: Åråsen Stadion; Attendance: 3,842; Referee: Rohit Saggi

2 April 2018 3	Kristiansund	2–1	Lillestrøm	Kristiansund
18:00 CEST (UTC+2)	Aasmundsen 51'; Gjertsen 65'	Report	Amundsen (yellow card) 17'; Knudtzon 20'; Rafn (yellow card) 70'	Stadium: Kristiansund Stadion; Attendance: 3,959; Referee: Trygve Kjensli

9 April 2018 4	Lillestrøm	1–0	Start	Lillestrøm
19:00 CEST (UTC+2)	Olsen 32'; Antonijevic (yellow card) 61'	Report	Lowe (yellow card) 73'	Stadium: Åråsen Stadion; Attendance: 3,925; Referee: Dag Vidar Hafsås

15 April 2018 5	Molde	2–1	Lillestrøm	Molde
18:00 CEST (UTC+2)	Haaland 41' (pen.); Hussain (yellow card) 45'; Aursnes (yellow card) 45'; Wadji 90+2'	Report	Krogstad 25' (yellow card) 57'; Brenden (yellow card) 45+1'	Stadium: Aker Stadion; Attendance: 7,411; Referee: Svein Oddvar Moen

22 April 2018 6	Lillestrøm	0–1	Ranheim	Lillestrøm
18:00 CEST (UTC+2)	Amundsen (yellow card) 41'; Olsen (yellow card) 42'	Report	Kvande (yellow card) 25'; Løkberg (yellow card) 31'; Alseth (yellow card) 60'; Reginiussen 62'	Stadium: Åråsen Stadion; Attendance: 5,184; Referee: Rohit Saggi

30 April 2018 7	Stabæk	3–2	Lillestrøm	Bærum
19:00 CEST (UTC+2)	Brynhildsen 40', 58'; Hanche-Olsen (yellow card) 44'; Omoijuanfo 50'; Vetlesen (yellow card) 90+3'	Report	Mathew 22'; Martin 66'	Stadium: Nadderud Stadion; Attendance: 3,210; Referee: Kai Erik Steen

6 May 2018 8	Lillestrøm	1–0	Sandefjord	Lillestrøm
18:00 CEST (UTC+2)	Mathew 13'; Martin (yellow card) 88'	Report		Stadium: Åråsen Stadion; Attendance: 4,715; Referee: Kristoffer Hagenes

13 May 2018 9	Tromsø	1–2	Lillestrøm	Tromsø
18:00 CEST (UTC+2)	Ødegaard 45'	Report	Martin 22'; Olsen 26'; Brenden (yellow card) 74'	Stadium: Alfheim Stadion; Attendance: 3,885; Referee: Trygve Kjensli

16 May 2018 10	Rosenborg	3–0	Lillestrøm	Trondheim
18:00 CEST (UTC+2)	Bendtner 13'; Helland 61'; Søderlund 75'	Report	Kippe (yellow card) 32'	Stadium: Lerkendal Stadion; Attendance: 21,045; Referee: Ola Hobber Nilsen

21 May 2018 11	Lillestrøm	1–1	Brann	Lillestrøm
18:00 CEST (UTC+2)	Mathew 35'; Kippe (yellow card) 89'	Report	Marengo 83'; Karadas (yellow card) 89'	Stadium: Åråsen Stadion; Attendance: 6,078; Referee: Tommy Skjerven

26 May 2018 12	Vålerenga	1–0	Lillestrøm	Oslo
17:00 CEST (UTC+2)	Johnson (yellow card) 62'; Finne 90+6'	Report	Kippe (yellow card) 87'; Amundsen (yellow card) 89'	Stadium: Intility Arena; Attendance: 13,527; Referee: Kai Erik Steen

10 June 2018 13	Lillestrøm	0–0	Odd	Lillestrøm
18:00 CEST (UTC+2)	Rafn (yellow card) 77'	Report	Ruud (yellow card) 90+3'	Stadium: Åråsen Stadion; Attendance: 5,060; Referee: Rohit Saggi

24 June 2018 14	Haugesund	2–2	Lillestrøm	Haugesund
18:00 CEST (UTC+2)	David 43'; Stølås 77'	Report	Olsen 28', 51'; Kippe (yellow card) 80'	Stadium: Haugesund Stadion; Attendance: 4,311; Referee: Kai Erik Steen

2 July 2018 15	Lillestrøm	1–1	Strømsgodset	Lillestrøm
18:00 CEST (UTC+2)	Olsen 90+7'	Report	Jradi 35'; Pedersen (yellow card) 69'	Stadium: Åråsen Stadion; Attendance: 4,842; Referee: Dag Vidar Hafsås

8 July 2018 16	Odd	3–1	Lillestrøm	Skien
18:00 CEST (UTC+2)	Rashani 13'; Bergan 55'; Mladenovic 65'	Report	Olsen 78'	Stadium: Skagerak Arena; Attendance: 5,421; Referee: Svein Oddvar Moen

5 August 2018 17	Lillestrøm	2–2	Molde	Lillestrøm
20:00 CEST (UTC+2)	Smárason 17'; Mathew (yellow card) 29'; Knudtzon (yellow card) 34'; Olsen 87'; Martin (yellow card) 89'	Report	Aursnes 37'; Gabrielsen (yellow card) 44'; Hussain 64'	Stadium: Åråsen Stadion; Attendance: 4,529; Referee: Kai Erik Steen

12 August 2018 18	Sarpsborg 08	2–0	Lillestrøm	Sarpsborg
18:00 CEST (UTC+2)	Zachariassen (yellow card) 48' (goal) 73'; Mortensen 60'	Report	Melgalvis (yellow card) 6'; Kippe (yellow card) 32' (yellow-red card) 33'; Smárason (yellow card) 39'	Stadium: Sarpsborg Stadion; Attendance: 4,947; Referee: Tom Harald Hagen

19 August 2018 19	Lillestrøm	1–1	Haugesund	Lillestrøm
18:00 CEST (UTC+2)	Smárason 33' (pen.)	Report	Wadji 10' (yellow card) 36'; Stølås (yellow card) 51'; Nilsen (yellow card) 56'; Kallevåg (yellow card) 90+3'	Stadium: Åråsen Stadion; Attendance: 4,676; Referee: Sigurd Smehus Kringstad

26 August 2018 20	Sandefjord	1–3	Lillestrøm	Sandefjord
18:00 CEST (UTC+2)	Høibråten (yellow card) 22'; Pau Morer 80'	Report	Olsen 26'; Mathew (yellow card) 46'; Smárason 58', 71'	Stadium: Komplett Arena; Attendance: 3,430; Referee: Espen Eskås

2 September 2018 21	Lillestrøm	0–1	Vålerenga	Lillestrøm
20:00 CEST (UTC+2)	Smárason (yellow card) 43'; Kippe (yellow card) 76'	Report	Finne 33' (yellow card) 36'; Tollås (yellow card) 49'; Holm (yellow card) 74'; Nouri (yellow card) 77'	Stadium: Åråsen Stadion; Attendance: 10,409; Referee: Tom Harald Hagen

16 September 2018 22	Start	3–0	Lillestrøm	Kristiansand
18:00 CEST (UTC+2)	Akinyemi 5'; Lowe (yellow card) 14'; Kabran 20' (pen.); Bringaker 78'; Christensen (yellow card) 90'	Report	Amundsen (red card) 19'; Smárason (yellow card) 45+3'; Ødemarksbakken (yellow card) 86'; Pedersen (yellow card) 87'	Stadium: Sør Arena; Attendance: 10,419; Referee: Ola Hobber Nilsen

24 September 2018 23	Lillestrøm	1–0	Tromsø	Lillestrøm
19:00 CEST (UTC+2)	Smárason 79' (pen.)	Report	Taylor (yellow card) 62'	Stadium: Åråsen Stadion; Attendance: 4,672; Referee: Svein Oddvar Moen

30 September 2018 24	Lillestrøm	3–2	Stabæk	Lillestrøm
18:00 CEST (UTC+2)	Pedersen (yellow card) 42'; Olsen 48'; Marić (yellow card) 68'; Haakenstad 81', 83'	Report	Børkeeiet (yellow card) 15'; Boli 69' (pen.), 70'; Vetlesen (yellow card) 72'; Keita (yellow card) 74'	Stadium: Åråsen Stadion; Attendance: 4,642; Referee: Tore Hansen

7 October 2018 25	Brann	1–1	Lillestrøm	Bergen
20:00 CEST (UTC+2)	Teniste 64'	Report	Ødemarksbakken 78'	Stadium: Brann Stadion; Attendance: 9,282; Referee: Ola Hobber Nilsen

21 October 2018 26	Lillestrøm	0–0	Rosenborg	Lillestrøm
18:00 CEST (UTC+2)	Smárason (yellow card) 73'	Report	Meling (yellow card) 16'; Trondsen (yellow card) 45'; Helland (yellow card) 80'	Stadium: Åråsen Stadion; Attendance: 8,256; Referee: Rohit Saggi

28 October 2018 27	Ranheim	3–2	Lillestrøm	Trondheim
18:00 CET (UTC+1)	Tønne 34' (yellow card) 90+3'; Løkberg 38'; Witry 53'	Report	Rafn 12'; Mathew 83'	Stadium: EXTRA Arena; Attendance: 1,825; Referee: Sigurd Kringstad

5 November 2018 28	Lillestrøm	1–1	Bodø/Glimt	Lillestrøm
19:00 CET (UTC+1)	Smárason 10'; Amundsen (yellow card) 68'	Report	Opseth 3'; Bjørnbak (yellow card) 41'; Layouni (yellow card) 67'	Stadium: Åråsen Stadion; Attendance: 5.510; Referee: Espen Eskås

11 November 2018 29	Strømsgodset	2–2	Lillestrøm	Drammen
18:00 CET (UTC+1)	Abdellaoue 20', 52'	Report	Olsen 31'; Brenden (yellow card) 81'; M.Sætra 89' (o.g.)	Stadium: Marienlyst Stadion; Attendance: 5,695; Referee: Dag Vidar Hafsås

24 November 2018 30	Lillestrøm	2–0	Kristiansund	Lillestrøm
18:00 CET (UTC+1)	Smárason 15'; Olsen 85'	Report	Diop (yellow card) 64'	Stadium: Åråsen Stadion; Attendance: 6,783; Referee: Svein Oddvar Moen

==== Table ====
Pos	Team	Pld	W	D	L	GF	GA	GD	Pts	Qualification or relegation
10	Tromsø	30	11	3	16	41	48	−7	36	
11	Bodø/Glimt	30	6	14	10	32	35	−3	32	
12	Lillestrøm	30	7	11	12	34	44	−10	32	
13	Strømsgodset	30	7	10	13	46	48	−2	31	
14	Stabæk (O)	30	6	11	13	37	50	−13	29	Qualification for the relegation play-offs

Source: Football Association of Norway (in Norwegian), Soccerway
Rules for classification: 1) Points; 2) Goal difference; 3) Goals scored; 4) Head-to-head points; 5) Head-to-head goal difference; 6) Head-to-head away goals scored (only if between two teams); 7) Head-to-head goals scored; 8) Play-off (only used to decide champions or relegation).
(O) Play-off winners

=== Norwegian Cup ===
18 April 2017 First Round	Kløfta	0–3	Lillestrøm	Ullensaker
18:00 CEST (UTC+2)		Report	Brenden 19'; Olsen 29'; Mathew 76'	Stadium: Bakkedalen; Attendance: 1,750; Referee: Eivind Bodding

2 May 2018 First Round	Lørenskog	1–5	Lillestrøm	Lørenskog
18:00 CEST (UTC+2)	R.Alba 8'; E.Farstad (yellow card) 72'	Report	T.Paulsen 19' (o.g.); Sandberg 50'; Martin (yellow card) 51'; Rafn (yellow card) 56'; Melgalvis 73'; Krogstad 76'; Brenden 87'	Stadium: Rolvsrud stadion Attendance: 1,184; Referee: Ajdin Medic

9 May 2018 Third round	KFUM Oslo	1–3	Lillestrøm	Oslo
18:00 CEST (UTC+2)	D.Gaye 54'	Report	Martin 19'; Olsen 25'; Kippe (yellow card) 89'; Mathew 90+4'	Stadium: KFUM Arena; Attendance: 1,169; Referee: Svein Tore Sinnes

30 May 2018 Fourth Round	Lillestrøm	4–1	Brann	Lillestrøm
20:00 CEST (UTC+2)	Mathew 51'; Martin 68'; Olsen 75'; Haakenstad 90'	Report	Karadas 52'	Stadium: Åråsen Stadion; Attendance: 4,456; Referee: Tom Harald Hagen

26 September 2018 Quarterfinal	Lillestrøm	2–0	Bryne	Lillestrøm
18:00 CEST (UTC+2)	Ayagwa (yellow card) 17'; Lehne Olsen 66'; Martin 69' (pen.)	Report	E.Lye (yellow card) 22'	Stadium: Åråsen Stadion; Attendance: 3,777; Referee: Trygve Kjensli

31 October 2018 Semifinal	Strømsgodset	3–0	Lillestrøm	Drammen
20:00 CET (UTC+1)	Abdellaoue 49', 52', 83'	Report	Knudtzon (yellow card) 88'	Stadium: Marienlyst Stadion; Attendance: 5,765; Referee: Tom Harald Hagen

=== Europa League ===
==== Qualifying phase ====
26 July 2018 2nd qualifying round 1st leg	LASK (Austria)	4–0	(Norway) Lillestrøm	Pasching, Austria
19:45 CEST (UTC+2)	Goiginger 6', 70'; Holland (yellow card) 38' (goal) 45+1'; Frieser 90+1'	Report	Martin (yellow card) 47'; Knudtzon (yellow card) 49'; Mathew (yellow card) 86'	Stadium: Waldstadion; Attendance: 8,304; Referee: Aleksei Eskov (Russia)

2 August 2018 2nd qualifying round 2nd leg	Lillestrøm (Norway)	1–2 (1–6 agg.)	(Austria) LASK	Lillestrøm, Norway
18:30 CEST (UTC+2)	Olsen 79'	Report	Goiginger 35'; Tetteh 65'; Benko (yellow card) 72'	Stadium: Åråsen Stadion; Attendance: 1,975; Referee: Vilhjálmur Thórarinsson (Iceland)

== Squad statistics ==
As of match played 24 November 2018

=== Appearances and goals ===
No.	Pos	Nat	Player	Total		Eliteserien		Norwegian Cup		Europa League		Mesterfinalen	
No.	Pos	Nat	Player	Apps	Goals	Apps	Goals	Apps	Goals	Apps	Goals	Apps	Goals
1	GK	(Croatia) CRO	Marko Marić	32	0	25	0	4+1	0	1	0	1	0
2	DF	(Norway) NOR	Mats Haakenstad	36	3	22+5	2	5+1	1	2	0	1	0
3	DF	(Norway) NOR	Simen Kind Mikalsen	31	0	20+5	0	3+1	0	1+1	0	0	0
4	DF	(Norway) NOR	Marius Amundsen	33	0	24+1	0	5	0	2	0	1	0
5	DF	(Norway) NOR	Simen Rafn	37	1	26+2	1	6	0	2	0	1	0
6	MF	(Nigeria) NGR	Ifeanyi Mathew	39	7	30	4	6	3	2	0	1	0
9	FW	(England) ENG	Gary Martin	26	5	7+12	2	4	3	2	0	1	0
10	FW	(Norway) NOR	Thomas Lehne Olsen	37	17	29	12	5	4	1+1	1	1	0
11	FW	(Norway) NOR	Erling Knudtzon	29	1	20+3	1	1+2	0	2	0	1	0
12	MF	(Nigeria) NGR	Raphael Ayagwa	3	0	0+2	0	1	0	0	0	0	0
13	DF	(Norway) NOR	Frode Kippe	32	0	26	0	3	0	2	0	1	0
14	MF	(Norway) NOR	Fredrik Krogstad	36	1	22+6	1	4+1	0	2	0	1	0
15	MF	(Norway) NOR	Erik Brenden	31	2	14+10	0	2+4	2	0	0	0+1	0
17	MF	(Norway) NOR	Kristoffer Ødemarksbakken	23	2	7+9	2	4+1	0	0+1	0	0+1	0
22	DF	(Serbia) SRB	Stefan Antonijevic	17	0	7+6	0	2	0	0+2	0	0	0
23	MF	(Denmark) DEN	Daniel A. Pedersen	15	0	12+1	0	1+1	0	0	0	0	0
24	DF	(Norway) NOR	Erik Sandberg	8	1	3+1	0	2+2	1	0	0	0	0
25	GK	(Estonia) EST	Matvei Igonen	8	0	5	0	2	0	1	0	0	0
33	DF	(Norway) NOR	Aleksander Melgalvis	28	1	16+8	1	2	0	1	0	0+1	0
88	MF	(Iceland) ISL	Arnór Smárason	14	7	13	7	1	0	0	0	0	0
	DF	(Norway) NOR	Arne Holter	1	0	0	0	0+1	0	0	0	0	0
Players away from Lillestrøm on loan:
7	MF	(Nigeria) NGR	Moses Ebiye	10	0	0+7	0	0+1	0	0+1	0	0+1	0
8	MF	(Nigeria) NGR	Charles Ezeh	12	0	2+5	0	3+1	0	0	0	1	0
16	FW	(Norway) NOR	Tobias Gran	1	0	0	0	0+1	0	0	0	0	0
Players who left Lillestrøm during the season:

=== Goal scorers ===
Place	Position	Nation	Number	Name	Eliteserien	Norwegian Cup	Europa League	Mesterfinalen	Total
1	FW	(Norway)	10	Thomas Lehne Olsen	12	4	1	0	17
2	MF	(Iceland)	88	Arnór Smárason	7	0	0	0	7
2	MF	(Nigeria)	6	Ifeanyi Mathew	4	3	0	0	7
4	FW	(England)	9	Gary Martin	2	3	0	0	5
5	DF	(Norway)	2	Mats Haakenstad	2	1	0	0	3
6	MF	(Norway)	17	Kristoffer Ødemarksbakken	2	0	0	0	2
6	DF	(Norway)	33	Aleksander Melgalvis	1	1	0	0	2
6	MF	(Norway)	14	Fredrik Krogstad	1	1	0	0	2
6	MF	(Norway)	15	Erik Brenden	0	2	0	0	2
6				Own goal	1	1	0	0	2
11	FW	(Norway)	11	Erling Knudtzon	1	0	0	0	1
11	DF	(Norway)	5	Simen Rafn	1	0	0	0	1
11	DF	(Norway)	24	Erik Sandberg	0	1	0	0	1
				TOTALS	34	17	1	0	52

=== Disciplinary record ===
Number	Nation	Position	Name	Eliteserien		Norwegian Cup		Europa League		Mesterfinalen		Total	
Number	Nation	Position	Name	Yellow card	Red card	Yellow card	Red card	Yellow card	Red card	Yellow card	Red card	Yellow card	Red card
1	(Croatia)	GK	Marko Marić	1	0	0	0	0	0	0	0	1	0
4	(Norway)	DF	Marius Amundsen	4	1	0	0	0	0	0	0	4	1
5	(Norway)	DF	Simen Rafn	2	0	1	0	0	0	0	0	3	0
6	(Nigeria)	MF	Ifeanyi Mathew	3	0	0	0	1	0	0	0	4	0
9	(England)	FW	Gary Martin	2	0	1	0	1	0	0	0	4	0
10	(Norway)	FW	Thomas Lehne Olsen	1	0	0	0	0	0	0	0	1	0
11	(Norway)	FW	Erling Knudtzon	1	0	1	0	1	0	0	0	3	0
12	(Nigeria)	MF	Raphael Ayagwa	0	0	1	0	0	0	0	0	1	0
13	(Norway)	DF	Frode Kippe	8	1	1	0	0	0	0	0	9	1
14	(Norway)	MF	Fredrik Krogstad	1	0	0	0	0	0	0	0	1	0
15	(Norway)	MF	Erik Brenden	3	0	0	0	0	0	0	0	3	0
17	(Norway)	MF	Kristoffer Ødemarksbakken	1	0	0	0	0	0	0	0	1	0
22	(Serbia)	DF	Stefan Antonijevic	1	0	0	0	0	0	0	0	1	0
23	(Denmark)	MF	Daniel A. Pedersen	2	0	0	0	0	0	0	0	2	0
33	(Norway)	DF	Aleksander Melgalvis	1	0	0	0	0	0	0	0	1	0
88	(Iceland)	MF	Arnór Smárason	4	0	0	0	0	0	0	0	4	0
			TOTALS	35	2	5	0	3	0	0	0	43	2
