= 2018 Mesterfinalen =

Lillestrøm	Rosenborg
0	1
- Date: 26 April 2018
- Venue: Åråsen Stadion, Lillestrøm
- Referee: Tom Harald Hagen (Grue IL)
- Attendance: 4,295

The 2018 Mesterfinalen was the second edition of Mesterfinalen and the 4th Norwegian super cup overall. Mesterfinalen is the annual game between the League champions and the Cup champions in Norway, or the second-placed team in Eliteserien if the same team are both reigning League and Cup champions. The final was played on 26 April between league champions and defending Mesterfinalen champions Rosenborg and the Cup champions Lillestrøm. The match was due to be played 5 March, but due to weather conditions it was moved to 26 April.

Rosenborg won the final with the score 0–1. After a goalless first half, Nicklas Bendtner scored the winning goal in the 52nd minute.

== Match details ==
26 April 2018
18:30 CEST

Lillestrøm	0–1	Rosenborg
	Report	Bendtner 52'

Åråsen Stadion, Lillestrøm
Attendance: 4,295
Referee: Tom Harald Hagen (Grue)

Lillestrøm	Rosenborg

GK	24	(Croatia) Marko Marić
RB	2	(Norway) Mats Haakenstad
CB	4	(Norway) Marius Amundsen
CB	13	(Norway) Frode Kippe (c)
LB	5	(Norway) Simen Rafn
CM	6	(Nigeria) Ifeanyi Mathew
CM	8	(Nigeria) Charles Ezeh	(substituted off) 80'
CM	14	(Norway) Fredrik Krogstad	(substituted off) 60'
RW	11	(Norway) Erling Knudtzon
CF	9	(England) Gary Martin	(substituted off) 54'
LW	10	(Norway) Thomas Lehne Olsen	(substituted off) 46'
Substitutes:
GK	40	(Norway) Mads Hedenstad Christiansen
DF	24	(Norway) Erik Sandberg
MF	7	(Nigeria) Moses Ebiye	(substituted in) 80'
MF	15	(Norway) Erik Brenden	(substituted in) 46'
MF	17	(Norway) Kristoffer Ødemarksbakken	(substituted in) 60'
MF	33	(Norway) Aleksander Melgalvis	(substituted in) 54'
FW	16	(Norway) Tobias Gran
Manager:
(Norway) Arne Erlandsen

GK	24	(Norway) Arild Østbø
RB	21	(Norway) Erlend Dahl Reitan
CB	14	(Norway) Even Hovland	(substituted off) 46'
CB	26	(Bosnia and Herzegovina) Besim Šerbečić	(yellow card) 81'
LB	20	(Denmark) Malte Amundsen
DM	22	(Norway) Morten Konradsen
DM	5	(Denmark) Jacob Rasmussen
AM	9	(Denmark) Nicklas Bendtner (c)	(substituted off) 78'
RW	17	(Sweden) Jonathan Levi	(substituted off) 90'
LW	27	(Norway) Rafik Zekhnini	(yellow card) 63' (substituted off) 78'
CF	34	(Norway) Erik Botheim	(substituted off) 65'
Substitutes:
GK	1	(Norway) André Hansen
DF	4	(Norway) Tore Reginiussen	(substituted in) 46'
DF	7	(Norway) Torbjørn Lysaker Heggem	(substituted in) 90'
MF	8	(Norway) Emil Konradsen Ceide	(substituted in) 78'
MF	14	(Norway) Alexander Søderlund	(substituted in) 65'
FW	19	(Norway) Robert Williams
FW	36	(Norway) Olaus Jair Skarsem	(substituted in) 62'
Manager:
(Norway) Kåre Ingebrigtsen

MATCH OFFICIALS

- Assistant referees:
  - Reidar Mørkestøl Gundersen (IF Frisk-Asker)
  - Øystein Simon Ytterland (IL Valder)
- Fourth official: Espen Andreas Eskås (Bækkelagets SK)

MATCH RULES

- 90 minutes
- Penalty shoot-out if scores level after 90 minutes
- Seven named substitutes
- Maximum of five substitutions
