= 2017 Lillestrøm SK season =

Lillestrøm
2017 season
- Chairman: Per Mathisen
- Manager: Arne Erlandsen
- Stadium: Åråsen Stadion
- Eliteserien: 12th
- Norwegian Cup: Winners
- Top goalscorer: League: Erling Knudtzon (8); All: Erling Knudtzon (9)

The 2017 season is Lillestrøm's 41st consecutive year in Eliteserien and their first full season with Arne Erlandsen as manager.

== Squad ==
As of 24 August 2017

Note: Flags indicate national team as defined under FIFA eligibility rules; some limited exceptions apply. Players may hold more than one non-FIFA nationality.

| No. | Pos. | Nation | Player |
|---|---|---|---|
| 1 | GK | CRO | Marko Marić (loan from 1899 Hoffenheim) |
| 2 | DF | NOR | Mats Haakenstad |
| 3 | DF | NOR | Simen Kind Mikalsen |
| 4 | DF | NOR | Marius Amundsen |
| 5 | DF | NOR | Simen Rafn |
| 6 | MF | NGR | Ifeanyi Mathew |
| 7 | MF | NGR | Moses Ebiye |
| 8 | MF | NGR | Charles Ezeh |
| 10 | FW | NGR | Marco Tagbajumi |
| 11 | FW | NOR | Erling Knudtzon |
| 13 | DF | NOR | Frode Kippe (Captain) |
| 14 | MF | NOR | Fredrik Krogstad |

| No. | Pos. | Nation | Player |
|---|---|---|---|
| 15 | MF | NOR | Erik Brenden |
| 16 | FW | NOR | Tobias Gran |
| 19 | MF | NOR | Sheriff Sinyan |
| 21 | FW | NOR | Petter Mathias Olsen |
| 22 | DF | SRB | Stefan Antonijevic |
| 23 | MF | BUL | Chigozie Udoji |
| 24 | DF | NOR | Erik Sandberg |
| 28 | MF | NOR | Henrik Loholt Kristiansen |
| 29 | GK | NOR | Emil Ødegaard |
| 33 | DF | NOR | Aleksander Melgalvis |
| 77 | GK | KEN | Arnold Origi |

=== Out on loan ===
Note: Flags indicate national team as defined under FIFA eligibility rules; some limited exceptions apply. Players may hold more than one non-FIFA nationality.

| No. | Pos. | Nation | Player |
|---|---|---|---|
| 17 | MF | NOR | Jørgen Kolstad (on loan at Kongsvinger) |
| 29 | GK | NOR | Emil Ødegaard (on loan at Levanger) |
| — | DF | SWE | Martin Falkeborn (on loan at IK Frej) |

== Transfers ==
=== Winter ===
In: Note: Flags indicate national team as defined under FIFA eligibility rules; some limited exceptions apply. Players may hold more than one non-FIFA nationality.

| No. | Pos. | Nation | Player |
|---|---|---|---|
| 1 | GK | POR | Daniel Fernandes (from (United States) Rayo OKC) |
| 2 | DF | NOR | Mats Haakenstad (from (Norway) Fram Larvik) |
| 5 | DF | NOR | Simen Rafn (from (Sweden) Gefle) |
| 9 | FW | NOR | Bajram Ajeti (from (Norway) Bryne) |
| 14 | MF | NOR | Fredrik Krogstad (loan return from (Norway) Ull/Kisa) |
| 16 | FW | NOR | Tobias Gran (from (Norway) Rosenborg) |
| 22 | DF | SRB | Stefan Antonijevic (from (United States) Tampa Bay Rowdies) |
| 23 | MF | BUL | Chigozie Udoji (from (China) Qingdao Jonoon) |
| 27 | FW | CZE | Michal Škoda (on loan from (Czech Republic) Zbrojovka Brno) |
| 33 | DF | NOR | Aleksander Melgavis (from (Norway) Strømmen) |

Out: Note: Flags indicate national team as defined under FIFA eligibility rules; some limited exceptions apply. Players may hold more than one non-FIFA nationality.

| No. | Pos. | Nation | Player |
|---|---|---|---|
| 1 | GK | ISL | Haraldur Björnsson (to (Iceland) Stjarnan) |
| 2 | DF | SWE | Martin Falkeborn (on loan to (Sweden) Frej, previously on loan at (Norway) Ull/Kisa) |
| 5 | DF | NOR | Ole Martin Rindarøy (loan return to (Norway) Molde) |
| 7 | MF | LBN | Bassel Jradi (loan return to (Norway) Strømsgodset) |
| 8 | MF | FRA | Malaury Martin (to (Scotland) Heart of Midlothian) |
| 9 | FW | ISL | Árni Vilhjálmsson (to (Sweden) Jönköpings Södra, previously on loan at (Iceland) Breiðablik) |
| 12 | GK | NOR | Jacob Faye-Lund |
| 14 | MF | GHA | Francis Dickoh |
| 16 | DF | NOR | Håkon Skogseid (to (Norway) Stabæk) |
| 17 | MF | NOR | Jørgen Kolstad (on loan to (Norway) Kongsvinger) |
| 19 | FW | ENG | Gary Martin (loan return to (Iceland) Víkingur) |
| 20 | MF | NOR | Mohamed Ofkir (to (Belgium) Lokeren) |
| 27 | MF | NOR | Markus Brændsrød (to (Norway) Strømmen, previously on loan) |
| — | DF | NOR | Nikolas Walstad (to (Norway) Ull/Kisa) |

=== Summer ===
In: Note: Flags indicate national team as defined under FIFA eligibility rules; some limited exceptions apply. Players may hold more than one non-FIFA nationality.

| No. | Pos. | Nation | Player |
|---|---|---|---|
| 1 | GK | CRO | Marko Marić (on loan from (Germany) 1899 Hoffenheim) |
| 7 | MF | NGR | Moses Ebiye (from (Nigeria) Akwa United) |
| 8 | MF | NGR | Charles Ezeh (from (Nigeria) Gee-Lec Football Academy) |
| 10 | FW | NGR | Marco Tagbajumi (from (Norway) Strømsgodset) |

Out: Note: Flags indicate national team as defined under FIFA eligibility rules; some limited exceptions apply. Players may hold more than one non-FIFA nationality.

| No. | Pos. | Nation | Player |
|---|---|---|---|
| 1 | GK | POR | Daniel Fernandes (released) |
| 7 | FW | SVK | Tomáš Malec (loan return to (Austria) LASK Linz) |
| 9 | FW | KOS | Bajram Ajeti (to (Sweden) Gefle) |
| 18 | MF | NGR | Bonke Innocent (to (Sweden) Malmö FF) |
| 21 | FW | NOR | Petter Mathias Olsen (on loan to (Norway) Strømmen) |
| 27 | FW | CZE | Michal Škoda (loan return to (Czech Republic) Zbrojovka Brno) |
| 29 | GK | NOR | Emil Ødegaard (on loan to (Norway) Levanger) |

== Competitions ==
=== Eliteserien ===
==== Results summary ====
| Overall | | | | | | | | Home | | | | | | Away | | | | | |
| Pld | W | D | L | GF | GA | GD | Pts | W | D | L | GF | GA | GD | W | D | L | GF | GA | GD |
|---|---|---|---|---|---|---|---|---|---|---|---|---|---|---|---|---|---|---|---|
| 30 | 10 | 8 | 12 | 39 | 43 | −4 | 38 | 7 | 2 | 6 | 19 | 16 | +3 | 3 | 6 | 6 | 20 | 27 | −7 |

Last updated: 26 November 2017.
Source: see below

==== Results by round ====
| Round | 1 | 2 | 3 | 4 | 5 | 6 | 7 | 8 | 9 | 10 | 11 | 12 | 13 | 14 | 15 | 16 | 17 | 18 | 19 | 20 | 21 | 22 | 23 | 24 | 25 | 26 | 27 | 28 | 29 | 30 |
|---|---|---|---|---|---|---|---|---|---|---|---|---|---|---|---|---|---|---|---|---|---|---|---|---|---|---|---|---|---|---|
| Ground | H | A | H | A | H | A | H | A | H | A | H | A | H | A | H | A | H | A | A | H | A | H | H | A | H | A | H | A | H | A |
| Result | W | L | L | L | L | W | L | D | L | D | W | W | W | L | W | D | D | D | L | W | D | D | L | L | W | L | W | L | L | W |
| Position | 5 | 8 | 11 | 13 | 15 | 13 | 14 | 15 | 15 | 15 | 15 | 11 | 10 | 11 | 10 | 10 | 9 | 10 | 12 | 10 | 9 | 10 | 10 | 11 | 11 | 11 | 10 | 12 | 13 | 12 |

Updated to match(es) played on 26 November 2017. Source: see below
A = Away; H = Home; W = Win; D = Draw; L = Loss

==== Results ====
| 2 April 2017 1 | Lillestrøm | 2–1 | Sandefjord | Lillestrøm |
| 15:30 CEST (UTC+2) | Škoda 86'; Olsen 90+4' (o.g.) | Report | Kastrati 22'; Bindia (yellow card) 38'; Seck (yellow card) 85'; Storbæk (yellow card) 90+4' | Stadium: Åråsen Stadion; Attendance: 8,503; Referee: Martin Lundby |

| 5 April 2017 2 | Molde | 2–1 | Lillestrøm | Molde |
| 19:00 CEST (UTC+2) | S.Svendsen 29'; Gregersen 90+3' | Report | Mathew 47' | Stadium: Aker Stadion; Attendance: 6,635; Referee: Espen Eskås |

| 9 April 2017 3 | Lillestrøm | 0–2 | Haugesund | Lillestrøm |
| 18:00 CEST (UTC+2) | Knudtzon (yellow card) 7'; Udoji (yellow card) 66' | Report | Abdi 30' (yellow card) 67'; Ibrahim 90+2' | Stadium: Åråsen Stadion; Attendance: 5,090; Referee: Kai Erik Steen |

| 17 April 2017 4 | Aalesund | 3–0 | Lillestrøm | Ålesund |
| 18:00 CEST (UTC+2) | Grétarsson 5'; Veldwijk 45'; Abdellaoue 48' | Report | Amundsen (yellow card) 22'; Knudtzon (yellow card) 62'; Malec 72' | Stadium: Color Line Stadion; Attendance: 5,370; Referee: Ola Hobber Nilsen |

| 23 April 2017 5 | Lillestrøm | 0–2 | Brann | Lillestrøm |
| 20:00 CEST (UTC+2) | | Report | Nilsen (yellow card) 34'; Braaten (yellow card) 40' (goal) 53'; Rólantsson 60' | Stadium: Åråsen Stadion; Attendance: 5,777; Referee: Tom Harald Hagen |

| 30 April 2017 6 | Sogndal | 0–1 | Lillestrøm | Sogndalsfjøra |
| 18:00 CEST (UTC+2) | | Report | Mikalsen 63' | Stadium: Fosshaugane Campus; Attendance: 3,024; Referee: Tore Hansen |

| 8 May 2017 7 | Lillestrøm | 0–1 | Odd | Lillestrøm |
| 19:00 CEST (UTC+2) | Kippe (yellow card) 60'; Ajeti (yellow card) 88' | Report | Occéan 76'; Ruud (yellow card) 85'; Diouf (yellow card) 87' | Stadium: Åråsen Stadion; Attendance: 4,527; Referee: Ola Hobber Nilsen |

| 13 May 2017 8 | Kristiansund | 1–1 | Lillestrøm | Kristiansund |
| 18:00 CEST (UTC+2) | Bamba (yellow card) 25'; Rønningen 65'; Ulvestad (yellow card) 87' | Report | Mikalsen (yellow card) 55'; Malec (yellow card) 75'; Rafn 84'; Innocent (red card) 90+2' | Stadium: Atlanten Stadion; Attendance: 3,794; Referee: Kristoffer Hagenes |

| 16 May 2017 9 | Lillestrøm | 1–2 | Sarpsborg 08 | Lillestrøm |
| 18:00 CEST (UTC+2) | Origi (yellow card) 45'; Mikalsen 90+3' | Report | Zachariassen 39'; Mortensen 76' | Stadium: Åråsen Stadion; Attendance: 5,421; Referee: Martin Lundby |

| 20 May 2017 10 | Rosenborg | 1–1 | Lillestrøm | Trondheim |
| 15:30 CEST (UTC+2) | Bendtner 59'; Vilhjálmsson (yellow card) 86' | Report | Kippe 81'; Ajeti (yellow card) 90+5' | Stadium: Lerkendal Stadion; Attendance: 18,947; Referee: Trygve Kjensli |

| 28 May 2017 11 | Lillestrøm | 4–1 | Tromsø | Lillestrøm |
| 18:00 CEST (UTC+2) | Udoji 9'; Kippe (yellow card) 51'; Knudtzon 54', 73', 77'; Melgalvis (yellow card) 76'; Ajeti (yellow card) 90+2' | Report | Ingebrigtsen 1'; Åsen (yellow card) 36'; Wangberg (yellow card) 50'; Antonsen (red card) 62' | Stadium: Åråsen Stadion; Attendance: 5,468; Referee: Rohit Saggi |

| 3 June 2017 12 | Stabæk | 2–4 | Lillestrøm | Bærum |
| 18:00 CEST (UTC+2) | Kassi (yellow card) 41'; Skogseid 45+1'; Brochmann 46'; Ba (yellow card) 50' | Report | Knudtzon 12', 56'; Kippe 70'; Rafn 85' | Stadium: Nadderud Stadion; Attendance: 3,604; Referee: Dag Vidar Hafsås |

| 18 June 2017 13 | Lillestrøm | 1–0 | Viking | Lillestrøm |
| 18:00 CEST (UTC+2) | Knudtzon (yellow card) 44'; Melgalvis 90+3' | Report | Ryerson (yellow card) 59' | Stadium: Åråsen Stadion; Attendance: 5,714; Referee: Martin Lundby |

| 24 June 2017 14 | Vålerenga | 3–1 | Lillestrøm | Oslo |
| 18:00 CEST (UTC+2) | Zahid 24'; Abdellaoue 27'; Finne 51' | Report | Krogstad 13'; Innocent (yellow card) 34'; Brenden (yellow card) 90+2' | Stadium: Ullevaal Stadion; Attendance: 11,407; Referee: Svein Oddvar Moen |

| 1 July 2017 15 | Lillestrøm | 2–0 | Strømsgodset | Lillestrøm |
| 18:00 CEST (UTC+2) | Udoji 32' (yellow card) 37'; Knudtzon 42' | Report | Júnior (yellow card) 29'; Andersen (yellow card) 51'; Glesnes (yellow card) 56'; Madsen (yellow card) 82'; Vilsvik (yellow card) 86'; Sivodedov (yellow card) 90+3' | Stadium: Åråsen Stadion; Attendance: 5,634; Referee: Kai Erik Steen |

| 10 July 2017 16 | Sarpsborg 08 | 3–3 | Lillestrøm | Sarpsborg |
| 19:00 CEST (UTC+2) | Heintz 13', 42'; Nielsen (yellow card) 59'; Fejzullahu (yellow card) 72'; Mortensen 73'; Groven (yellow card) 76' | Report | Udoji 12'; Amundsen (yellow card) 26' (yellow-red card) 54'; Knudtzon 60'; Rafn (yellow card) 86'; Melgalvis 88' (pen.) | Stadium: Sarpsborg Stadion; Attendance: 4,843; Referee: Trygve Kjensli |

| 15 July 2017 17 | Lillestrøm | 2–2 | Stabæk | Lillestrøm |
| 18:00 CEST (UTC+2) | Knudtzon (yellow card) 61'; Mikalsen 81'; Brenden 88' | Report | Moe (yellow card) 19'; Brochmann 36'; Vetlesen (yellow card) 38'; Omoijuanfo 40'; Skjønsberg (yellow card) 51' | Stadium: Åråsen Stadion; Attendance: 4,280; Referee: Tom Harald Hagen |

| 6 August 2017 18 | Viking | 2–2 | Lillestrøm | Stavanger |
| 18:00 CEST (UTC+2) | Adegbenro 60'; Høiland 68' | Report | Krogstad 19' (pen.); Haakenstad 44'; Origi (yellow card) 66' | Stadium: Viking Stadion; Attendance: 8,052; Referee: Tommy Skjerven |

| 13 August 2017 19 | Strømsgodset | 3–1 | Lillestrøm | Drammen |
| 20:00 CEST (UTC+2) | Nguen 8', 21'; Pedersen 26' | Report | Amundsen (yellow card) 36'; Mikalsen (yellow card) 37'; Krogstad 44' (pen.) | Stadium: Marienlyst Stadion; Attendance: 5,713; Referee: Espen Eskås |

| 19 August 2017 20 | Lillestrøm | 2–1 | Vålerenga | Lillestrøm |
| 18:00 CEST (UTC+2) | Kippe 9'; Mathew 43'; Tagbajumi (yellow card) 67' | Report | Grindheim 29'; Dønnum (yellow card) 90+4' | Stadium: Åråsen Stadion; Attendance: 8,552; Referee: Svein Oddvar Moen |

| 10 September 2017 21 | Haugesund | 1–1 | Lillestrøm | Haugesund |
| 18:00 CEST (UTC+2) | Abdi 19'; Kovačević (yellow card) 73' | Report | Melgalvis 53' | Stadium: Haugesund Stadion; Attendance: 4,242; Referee: Trygve Kjensli |

| 17 September 2017 22 | Lillestrøm | 0–0 | Kristiansund | Lillestrøm |
| 18:00 CEST (UTC+2) | Tagbajumi (yellow card) 64' | Report | Øby (yellow card) 38'; Coly (yellow card) 81' | Stadium: Åråsen Stadion; Attendance: 4,569; Referee: Rohit Saggi |

| 24 September 2017 23 | Lillestrøm | 0–3 | Rosenborg | Lillestrøm |
| 18:00 CEST (UTC+2) | Amundsen (yellow card) 72' | Report | Adegbenro (yellow card) 13'; Bendtner 22', 73' (pen.); Helland 35' | Stadium: Åråsen Stadion; Attendance: 7,868; Referee: Ola Hobber Nilsen |

| 1 October 2017 24 | Tromsø | 2–1 | Lillestrøm | Tromsø |
| 18:00 CEST (UTC+2) | Ødegaard 1'; Olsen 17'; Ingebrigtsen (yellow card) 23' | Report | Mikalsen 56'; Melgalvis (yellow card) 61' | Stadium: Alfheim Stadion; Attendance: 3,594; Referee: Tom Harald Hagen |

| 15 October 2017 25 | Lillestrøm | 1–0 | Sogndal | Lillestrøm |
| 18:00 CEST (UTC+2) | Kippe (yellow card) 30' (goal) 89'; Amundsen (yellow card) 67' | Report | Hove (yellow card) 15' | Stadium: Åråsen Stadion; Attendance: 4,312; Referee: Svein Oddvar Moen |

| 23 October 2017 26 | Odd | 1–0 | Lillestrøm | Skien |
| 19:00 CEST (UTC+2) | Hussain (penalty missed) 25'; Haugen 44'; Samuelsen (yellow card) 54' | Report | Krogstad (penalty missed) 55'; Rafn (yellow card) 90' | Stadium: Skagerak Arena; Attendance: 6,164; Referee: Espen Eskås |

| 30 October 2017 27 | Lillestrøm | 4–0 | Aalesund | Lillestrøm |
| 19:00 CEST (UTC+2) | Kippe 24'; Mathew (yellow card) 49' (goal) 77'; Brenden 67'; Knudtzon 83' | Report | Hoff (yellow card) 11'; Grétarsson (yellow card) 26'; O.Lie (yellow card) 64' | Stadium: Åråsen Stadion; Attendance: 4,357; Referee: Tore Hansen |

| 5 November 2017 28 | Brann | 2–0 | Lillestrøm | Bergen |
| 18:00 CET (UTC+1) | Vega 8'; Nilsen (yellow card) 44'; Larsen (yellow card) 66'; Grønner 82'; Leciejewski (yellow card) 90' | Report | Kippe (yellow card) 77' | Stadium: Brann Stadion; Attendance: 9,594; Referee: Rohit Saggi |

| 19 November 2017 29 | Lillestrøm | 0–1 | Molde | Lillestrøm |
| 18:00 CET (UTC+1) | Tagbajumi (penalty missed) 83' | Report | Wadji 14'; Sarr (yellow card) 44'; Normann (yellow card) 71' | Stadium: Åråsen Stadion; Attendance: 4,358; Referee: Tommy Skjerven |

| 26 November 2017 30 | Sandefjord | 1–3 | Lillestrøm | Sandefjord |
| 18:00 CET (UTC+1) | Morer 43' (yellow card) 64'; Grorud (yellow card) 71'; Hansen (yellow card) 78' | Report | Melgalvis 24'; Krogstad 44', 90' | Stadium: Komplett Arena; Attendance: 3,034; Referee: Trygve Kjensli |

==== Table ====
| Pos | Team | Pld | W | D | L | GF | GA | GD | Pts | Qualification or relegation |
|---|---|---|---|---|---|---|---|---|---|---|
| 10 | Haugesund | 30 | 11 | 6 | 13 | 35 | 39 | −4 | 39 | |
| 11 | Tromsø | 30 | 10 | 8 | 12 | 42 | 49 | −7 | 38 | |
| 12 | Lillestrøm | 30 | 10 | 7 | 13 | 40 | 43 | −3 | 37 | Qualification for the Europa League second qualifying round (Note: Lillestrøm qualified for the Europa League second qualifying round as winners of the 2017 Norwegian Cup.) |
| 13 | Sandefjord | 30 | 11 | 3 | 16 | 38 | 51 | −13 | 36 | |
| 14 | Sogndal (R) | 30 | 8 | 8 | 14 | 38 | 48 | −10 | 32 | Qualification for the relegation play-offs |

Source: Football Association of Norway (in Norwegian), Soccerway
Rules for classification: 1) Points; 2) Goal difference; 3) Goals scored; 4) Head-to-head points; 5) Head-to-head goal difference; 6) Head-to-head away goals scored (only if between two teams); 7) Head-to-head goals scored; 8) Play-off (only used to decide champions or relegation).
(R) Relegated

=== Norwegian Cup ===
| 26 April 2017 First Round | Skjetten | 0–2 | Lillestrøm | Skjetten |
| 18:00 CEST (UTC+2) | | Report | Kippe (yellow card) 2'; Ajeti 27'; Škoda 47' | Stadium: Skjetten Stadion; Attendance: 1,750; Referee: Per Erik Haugen |

| 24 May 2017 Second Round | Brumunddal | 1–3 | Lillestrøm | Brumunddal |
| 18:00 CEST (UTC+2) | Eriksen 2' (yellow card) 54'; E.Holst (yellow card) 54'; J.Johansen (yellow card) 67' | Report | Ajeti 25'; Melgalvis 52'; Mathew (yellow card) 68'; Škoda 83'; Antonijevic (yellow card) 89' | Stadium: Sveum Idrettspark; Attendance: 1,212; Referee: Ajdin Medic |

| 31 May 2017 Third Round | Ull/Kisa | 2–4 | Lillestrøm | Jessheim |
| 18:30 CEST (UTC+2) | Sandberg 18'; Fjeldberg 82' | Report | Innocent 27'; Rafn 30'; Mikalsen 67'; Kippe 87' | Stadium: Jessheim Stadion; Attendance: 1,871; Referee: Trygve Kjensli |

| 9 August 2017 Fourth Round | Lillestrøm | 1–0 | Tromsø | Lillestrøm |
| 18:00 CEST (UTC+2) | Mikalsen (yellow card) 47'; Ezeh (yellow card) 52'; Tagbajumi 57' | Report | Nilsen (yellow card) 83' | Stadium: Åråsen Stadion; Attendance: 2,125; Referee: Tore Hansen |

| 26 August 2017 Quarterfinal | Lillestrøm | 3–1 | Stabæk | Lillestrøm |
| 18:30 CEST (UTC+2) | Melgalvis 21'; Tagbajumi 56'; Brenden (yellow card) 90+1'; Krogstad 90+2' | Report | Sæter 29'; Hanche-Olsen (yellow card) 39' (yellow-red card) 57' | Stadium: Åråsen Stadion; Attendance: 2,937; Referee: Kai Steen |

| 21 September 2017 Semifinal | Molde | 0–3 | Lillestrøm | Molde |
| 19:00 CEST (UTC+2) | Haaland (yellow card) 83' | Report | Mikalsen 75'; Knudtzon 87'; Melgalvis 90+1' | Stadium: Aker Stadion; Attendance: 6,482; Referee: Svein Oddvar Moen |

==== Final ====
| 3 December 2017 | Lillestrøm | 3–2 | Sarpsborg 08 | Oslo |
| 13:15 CET (UTC+1) | Mikalsen 2'; Haakenstad 12'; Kippe 59'; Marić (yellow card) 60'; Udoji (yellow card) 89' | Report | Mortensen 24'; Kippe 64' (o.g.); Jørgensen (yellow card) 68' | Stadium: Ullevaal Stadion; Attendance: 25,091; Referee: Ola Hobber Nilsen |

== Squad statistics ==
As of match played 3 December 2017

=== Appearances and goals ===
| No. | Pos | Nat | Player | Total | | Eliteserien | | Norwegian Cup | |
| No. | Pos | Nat | Player | Apps | Goals | Apps | Goals | Apps | Goals |
|---|---|---|---|---|---|---|---|---|---|
| 1 | GK | (Croatia) CRO | Marko Marić | 1 | 0 | 1 | 0 | 0 | 0 |
| 2 | DF | (Norway) NOR | Mats Haakenstad | 37 | 2 | 30 | 1 | 7 | 1 |
| 3 | DF | (Norway) NOR | Simen Kind Mikalsen | 34 | 7 | 25+2 | 4 | 7 | 3 |
| 4 | DF | (Norway) NOR | Marius Amundsen | 35 | 0 | 28 | 0 | 7 | 0 |
| 5 | DF | (Norway) NOR | Simen Rafn | 36 | 3 | 29 | 2 | 6+1 | 1 |
| 6 | MF | (Nigeria) NGR | Ifeanyi Mathew | 37 | 3 | 30 | 3 | 7 | 0 |
| 7 | MF | (Nigeria) NGR | Moses Ebiye | 8 | 0 | 1+7 | 0 | 0 | 0 |
| 8 | MF | (Nigeria) NGR | Charles Ezeh | 14 | 0 | 11 | 0 | 3 | 0 |
| 10 | FW | (Nigeria) NGR | Marco Tagbajumi | 16 | 2 | 5+7 | 0 | 0+4 | 2 |
| 11 | FW | (Norway) NOR | Erling Knudtzon | 34 | 9 | 29 | 8 | 5 | 1 |
| 13 | DF | (Norway) NOR | Frode Kippe | 30 | 7 | 19+5 | 5 | 5+1 | 2 |
| 14 | MF | (Norway) NOR | Fredrik Krogstad | 32 | 6 | 24+3 | 5 | 3+2 | 1 |
| 15 | MF | (Norway) NOR | Erik Brenden | 18 | 2 | 5+9 | 2 | 0+4 | 0 |
| 22 | MF | (United States) USA | Stefan Antonijevic | 19 | 0 | 5+11 | 0 | 2+1 | 0 |
| 23 | MF | (Bulgaria) BUL | Chigozie Udoji | 31 | 3 | 18+7 | 3 | 5+1 | 0 |
| 24 | DF | (Norway) NOR | Erik Sandberg | 1 | 0 | 0+1 | 0 | 0 | 0 |
| 27 | MF | (Czech Republic) CZE | Michal Škoda | 15 | 3 | 3+10 | 1 | 2 | 2 |
| 33 | DF | (Norway) NOR | Aleksander Melgalvis | 26 | 7 | 18+2 | 4 | 6 | 3 |
| 77 | GK | (Kenya) KEN | Arnold Origi | 32 | 0 | 26 | 0 | 6 | 0 |
Players away from Lillestrøm on loan:
| 21 | FW | (Norway) NOR | Petter Mathias Olsen | 3 | 0 | 0+1 | 0 | 0+2 | 0 |
Players who left Lillestrøm during the season:
| 1 | GK | (Portugal) POR | Daniel Fernandes | 4 | 0 | 3 | 0 | 1 | 0 |
| 7 | FW | (Slovakia) SVK | Tomáš Malec | 14 | 1 | 8+4 | 1 | 1+1 | 0 |
| 9 | FW | (Kosovo) KOS | Bajram Ajeti | 15 | 2 | 6+6 | 0 | 2+1 | 2 |
| 18 | MF | (Nigeria) NGR | Bonke Innocent | 11 | 1 | 6+3 | 0 | 2 | 1 |

=== Goal scorers ===
| Place | Position | Nation | Number | Name | Tippeligaen | Norwegian Cup | Total |
|---|---|---|---|---|---|---|---|
| 1 | FW | (Norway) | 11 | Erling Knudtzon | 8 | 1 | 9 |
| 2 | DF | (Norway) | 13 | Frode Kippe | 5 | 2 | 7 |
| 2 | DF | (Norway) | 33 | Aleksander Melgalvis | 4 | 3 | 7 |
| 2 | DF | (Norway) | 3 | Simen Kind Mikalsen | 4 | 3 | 7 |
| 5 | MF | (Norway) | 14 | Fredrik Krogstad | 5 | 1 | 6 |
| 6 | DF | (Norway) | 5 | Simen Rafn | 2 | 1 | 3 |
| 6 | MF | (Czech Republic) | 27 | Michal Škoda | 1 | 2 | 3 |
| 6 | MF | (Bulgaria) | 23 | Chigozie Udoji | 3 | 0 | 3 |
| 6 | MF | (Nigeria) | 6 | Ifeanyi Mathew | 3 | 0 | 3 |
| 10 | MF | (Norway) | 15 | Erik Brenden | 2 | 0 | 2 |
| 10 | DF | (Norway) | 2 | Mats Haakenstad | 1 | 1 | 2 |
| 10 | FW | (Kosovo) | 9 | Bajram Ajeti | 0 | 2 | 2 |
| 10 | FW | (Nigeria) | 10 | Marco Tagbajumi | 0 | 2 | 2 |
| 14 | FW | (Slovakia) | 7 | Tomáš Malec | 1 | 0 | 1 |
| 14 | MF | (Nigeria) | 18 | Bonke Innocent | 0 | 1 | 1 |
| 14 | | | | Own goal | 1 | 0 | 1 |
| | | | | TOTALS | 40 | 19 | 59 |

=== Disciplinary record ===
| Number | Nation | Position | Name | Tippeligaen | | Norwegian Cup | | Total | |
| Number | Nation | Position | Name | Yellow card | Red card | Yellow card | Red card | Yellow card | Red card |
| 1 | (Croatia) | GK | Marko Marić | 0 | 0 | 1 | 0 | 1 | 0 |
| 3 | (Norway) | DF | Simen Kind Mikalsen | 2 | 0 | 1 | 0 | 3 | 0 |
| 4 | (Norway) | DF | Marius Amundsen | 6 | 1 | 0 | 0 | 6 | 1 |
| 5 | (Norway) | DF | Simen Rafn | 2 | 0 | 0 | 0 | 2 | 0 |
| 6 | (Nigeria) | MF | Ifeanyi Mathew | 1 | 0 | 1 | 0 | 2 | 0 |
| 7 | (Slovakia) | FW | Tomáš Malec | 1 | 0 | 0 | 0 | 1 | 0 |
| 8 | (Nigeria) | MF | Charles Ezeh | 0 | 0 | 1 | 0 | 1 | 0 |
| 9 | (Kosovo) | FW | Bajram Ajeti | 3 | 0 | 1 | 0 | 4 | 0 |
| 10 | (Nigeria) | FW | Marco Tagbajumi | 2 | 0 | 0 | 0 | 2 | 0 |
| 11 | (Norway) | FW | Erling Knudtzon | 4 | 0 | 0 | 0 | 4 | 0 |
| 13 | (Norway) | DF | Frode Kippe | 4 | 0 | 1 | 0 | 5 | 0 |
| 14 | (Norway) | MF | Fredrik Krogstad | 1 | 0 | 0 | 0 | 1 | 0 |
| 15 | (Norway) | MF | Erik Brenden | 1 | 0 | 1 | 0 | 2 | 0 |
| 18 | (Nigeria) | MF | Bonke Innocent | 1 | 1 | 0 | 0 | 1 | 1 |
| 22 | (United States) | MF | Stefan Antonijevic | 1 | 0 | 0 | 0 | 1 | 0 |
| 23 | (Bulgaria) | MF | Chigozie Udoji | 2 | 0 | 1 | 0 | 3 | 0 |
| 33 | (Norway) | DF | Aleksander Melgalvis | 2 | 0 | 0 | 0 | 2 | 0 |
| 77 | (Kenya) | GK | Arnold Origi | 2 | 0 | 0 | 0 | 2 | 0 |
| | | | TOTALS | 33 | 2 | 10 | 0 | 43 | 2 |
