= Kristoffer Ødemarksbakken =

Norwegian footballer (born 1995)

Personal information
- Date of birth: 15 December 1995 (age 30)
- Place of birth: Maura, Norway
- Height: 1.81 m (5 ft 11 in)
- Position: Midfielder

Team information
- Current team: Skeid
- Number: 16

Youth career
- Bjerke

Senior career*
Years	Team	Apps	(Gls)
2011	Nannestad		
2012	Ull/Kisa 2		
2013–2017	Ull/Kisa	100	(17)
2018–2020	Lillestrøm	54	(5)
2020	→ Ull/Kisa (loan)	17	(5)
2021–2023	Aalesund	77	(8)
2024	KÍ Klaksvík	10	(4)
2025–	Skeid	45	(4)
- * Club domestic league appearances and goals as of 15 November 2026

Kristoffer Ødemarksbakken (born 15 December 1995) is a Norwegian footballer who plays for Skeid.

He hails from Maura, and moved from minnows Nannestad to the youth section of larger neighbors Ull/Kisa ahead of the 2012 season. One year later he was allowed to train with the senior team. The head coach was Arne Erlandsen, and Erlandsen again signed Ødemarksbakken ahead of the 2018 season. In his Eliteserien debut on home ground, Ødemarksbakken scored a goal and was declared man of the match by VG.

On 30 January 2025, Ødemarksbakken signed with Skeid Fotball on a contract for the upcoming 2025-season.

== Career statistics ==
=== Club ===
As of match played 23 April 2023

Appearances and goals by club, season and competition
Club	Season	League			National Cup		Continental		Other		Total	
Club	Season	Division	Apps	Goals	Apps	Goals	Apps	Goals	Apps	Goals	Apps	Goals
Ull/Kisa	2013	Adeccoligaen	5	0	1	0	-		-		6	0
Ull/Kisa	2014	1. divisjon	13	0	1	1	-		-		14	1
Ull/Kisa	2015	PostNord-ligaen	25	3	2	1	-		-		27	4
Ull/Kisa	2016	OBOS-ligaen	28	2	2	2	-		-		30	4
Ull/Kisa	2017	OBOS-ligaen	29	12	2	0	-		-		31	12
Ull/Kisa	Total		100	17	8	4	-	-	-	-	108	21
Lillestrøm	2018	Eliteserien	16	2	5	0	1	0	1	0	23	2
Lillestrøm	2019	Eliteserien	29	3	2	0	-		-		31	3
Lillestrøm	2020	OBOS-ligaen	9	0	0	0	-		-		9	0
Lillestrøm	Total		54	5	7	0	1	0	1	0	63	5
Ull/Kisa (loan)	2020	OBOS-ligaen	17	5	0	0	-		-		17	5
Ull/Kisa (loan)	Total		17	5	0	0	-	-	-	-	17	5
Aalesund	2021	OBOS-ligaen	28	6	2	1	-		-		30	7
Aalesund	2022	Eliteserien	28	2	1	0	–		–		29	2
Aalesund	2023	Eliteserien	3	0	0	0	–		–		3	0
Aalesund	Total		59	8	3	1	-	-	-	-	62	9
Career total			230	35	18	5	1	0	1	0	250	40
