= Simen Rafn =

Norwegian footballer (born 1992)

Personal information
- Date of birth: 16 February 1992 (age 34)
- Place of birth: Fredrikstad, Norway
- Height: 1.72 m (5 ft 8 in)
- Position: Right back

Team information
- Current team: Fredrikstad
- Number: 5

Youth career
- –2006: Skogstrand IL
- 2007–2010: Fredrikstad

Senior career*
Years	Team	Apps	(Gls)
2010–2015	Fredrikstad	133	(5)
2016	Gefle	0	(0)
2017–2020	Lillestrøm	111	(5)
2021–2022	Aalesund	53	(1)
2023–	Fredrikstad	75	(3)
- * Club domestic league appearances and goals as of 23 July 2026

Simen Rafn (born 16 February 1992) is a Norwegian professional footballer who plays as a right back for Fredrikstad.

== Career ==
Rafn was born and grew up in Fredrikstad, Norway, and started playing for the local club Skogstrand IL. As a 15-year-old, he joined Fredrikstad FK's youth academy and was later promoted to the senior team in 2010. He stayed in the club and played 136 league games, before transferring to Gefle as a free agent in November 2015. During the pre-season for 2016 Allsvenskan, Rafn picked up a knee injury and were to miss the whole season. In January 2017 he signed for Lillestrøm.

== Career statistics ==
As of 6 November 2025

Appearances and goals by club, season and competition
Club	Season	League			National Cup (Note: Including Norwegian Cup, Svenska Cupen)		Europe		Other		Total	
Club	Season	Division	Apps	Goals	Apps	Goals	Apps	Goals	Apps	Goals	Apps	Goals
Fredrikstad	2010	1. divisjon	25	2	1	0	—		3 (Note: Appearances in the Eliteserien play-offs)	0	29	2
Fredrikstad	2011	Eliteserien	16	0	3	0	—		—		19	0
Fredrikstad	2012	Eliteserien	11	1	0	0	—		—		11	1
Fredrikstad	2013	1. divisjon	21	1	3	0	—		—		24	1
Fredrikstad	2014	1. divisjon	30	0	2	0	—		1	0	33	0
Fredrikstad	2015	1. divisjon	30	1	1	0	—		—		31	1
Fredrikstad	Total		133	5	11	0	—		4	0	147	5
Gefle	2016	Allsvenskan	0	0	1	0	—		—		1	0
Lillestrøm	2017	Eliteserien	29	2	7	1	—		—		36	3
Lillestrøm	2018	Eliteserien	28	1	6	0	2 (Note: Appearances in UEFA Europa League)	0	1 (Note: Appearance in Mesterfinalen)	0	37	1
Lillestrøm	2019	Eliteserien	30	1	3	0	—		2	0	35	1
Lillestrøm	2020	1. divisjon	24	1	—		—		—		24	1
Lillestrøm	Total		111	5	16	1	2	0	3	0	132	6
Aalesund	2021	1. divisjon	25	0	2	0	—		—		27	0
Aalesund	2022	Eliterserien	28	1	3	0	—		—		31	1
Aalesund	Total		53	1	5	0	—		—		58	1
Fredrikstad	2023	1. divisjon	15	1	3	0	—		—		18	1
Fredrikstad	2024	Eliteserien	28	1	7	1	—		—		35	2
Fredrikstad	2025	Eliteserien	23	0	5	0	2 (Note: Appearances in UEFA Europa League)	0	—		30	0
Fredrikstad	Total		66	2	15	1	2	0	—		83	3
Career total			363	13	48	2	4	0	7	0	422	15

== Honours ==
Lillestrøm

- Norwegian Football Cup: 2017
- Mesterfinalen runner-up: 2018

Fredrikstad

- 1. divisjon: 2023
- Norwegian Cup: 2024
