= Tobias Salquist =

Danish footballer (born 1995)

Personal information
- Date of birth: 18 May 1995 (age 31)
- Place of birth: Ikast, Denmark
- Height: 1.90 m (6 ft 3 in)
- Position: Centre-back

Team information
- Current team: Nordsjælland
- Number: 3

Youth career
- 2001–2011: Midtjylland
- 2011–2015: Silkeborg

Senior career*
Years	Team	Apps	(Gls)
2015–2018	Silkeborg	38	(2)
2016–2017	→ Fjölnir (loan)	21	(2)
2018–2019	Waasland-Beveren	5	(0)
2019–2020	Lillestrøm	35	(3)
2020–2021	Hobro	16	(3)
2021–2023	Silkeborg	92	(6)
2024–2025	Chicago Fire	14	(0)
2025–	Nordsjælland	47	(1)
- * Club domestic league appearances and goals as of 18 October 2026

Tobias Salquist (born 18 May 1995) is a Danish footballer who plays as a centre-back for FC Nordsjælland.

== Club career ==
=== Silkeborg IF ===
Salquist joined Silkeborg IF from FC Midtjylland at the age of 16 as an U17-player.

Salquist had his Superliga debut on 25 April 2015, in a 0–1 defeat against FC Nordsjælland, where he replaced an injured Thorbjørn Holst Rasmussen in the 25th minute.

On 19 May 2015, Salquist signed a new three-year contract with Silkeborg.

On 30 May 2018, Silkeborg confirmed, that Salquist would leave the club in the summer, where his contract expired. At this time, there were rumors linking him together with a transfer to the Belgian club Waasland-Beveren. One day later, Salquist confirmed, that he was joining a Belgian club, without revealing which club.

==== Loan to Fjölnir ====
On 2 March 2016, Salquist was loaned out to Icelandic club Fjölnir.

=== Waasland-Beveren ===
On 11 June 2018, Waasland-Beveren confirmed that they had signed Salquist on a three-year contract.

=== Lillestrøm SK ===
On 7 January 2019, Lillestrøm SK confirmed that they had signed Salquist on a three-year contract. His former Silkeborg teammate Daniel A. Pedersen accidentally confirmed the transfer a few hours before the club itself released the news. On 7 September 2020 the club confirmed, that Salquist had agreed to terminate his contract so he could return to Denmark and be closer to his girlfriend, who was pregnant.

=== Hobro IK ===
After returning to Denmark, Salquist went on a trial at Esbjerg fB, but ended up joining Hobro IK on 9 September 2020, signing a deal for the rest of the year.

=== Return to Silkeborg ===
On 13 January 2021 Silkeborg IF confirmed, that Salquist had returned to the club on a three-year deal.

=== Chicago Fire ===
In January 2024, after three years at Silkeborg, Salquist moved to American club Chicago Fire FC on a deal until the end of 2025 with an option for one year further.

=== Nordsjælland ===
On 2 January 2025, Salquist returned to Denmark, signing with Nordsjælland on a deal until June 2028. Although all indications were that he would be loaned out to Chicago Fire for the rest of the season after his move to Nordsjælland, the club confirmed on 21 January 2025 that Salquist would stay in Nordsjælland after the sale of Lucas Hey.

== Career statistics ==
As of match played 18 October 2026

Appearances and goals by club, season and competition
Club	Season	League			National cup		League Cup		Continental		Other		Total	
Club	Season	Division	Apps	Goals	Apps	Goals	Apps	Goals	Apps	Goals	Apps	Goals	Apps	Goals
Silkebog	2014–15	Danish Superliga	5	0	0	0	—		—		—		5	0
Silkebog	2015–16	Danish 1st Division	4	0	2	0	—		—		—		6	0
Silkebog	2016–17	Danish Superliga	7	0	1	0	—		—		—		8	0
Silkebog	2017–18	Danish Superliga	22	2	6	1	—		—		2 (Note: Appearances in Danish Superliga play-offs)	0	30	3
Silkebog	Total		38	2	9	1	—		—		2	0	49	3
Fjölnir (loan)	2016	Besta deild karla	21	2	1	0	2	1	—		—		24	3
Beveren	2018–19	Belgian First Division A	5	0	1	0	—		—		—		6	0
Lillestrøm	2019	Eliteserien	25	3	2	0	—		—		2 (Note: Appearances in Eliteserien play-offs)	0	29	3
Lillestrøm	2020	Eliteserien	10	0	0	0	—		—		—		10	0
Lillestrøm	Total		35	3	2	0	—		—		2	0	39	3
Hobro	2020–21	Danish 1st Division	16	3	1	0	—		—		—		17	3
Silkeborg	2020–21	Danish 1st Division	14	1	—		—		—		—		14	1
Silkeborg	2021–22	Danish Superliga	32	3	2	0	—		—		—		34	3
Silkeborg	2022–23	Danish Superliga	30	2	4	0	—		8 (Note: Two appearances in UEFA Europa League, six appearances in UEFA Conference League)	0	—		42	2
Silkeborg	2023–24	Danish Superliga	16	0	3	1	—		—		—		19	1
Silkeborg	Total		92	6	9	1	—		8	0	—		109	7
Chicago Fire	2024	MLS	14	0	0	0	—		—		2 (Note: Appearances in Leagues Cup)	0	16	0
Nordsjælland	2024–25	Danish Superliga	11	0	—		—		—		—		11	0
Nordsjælland	2025–26	Danish Superliga	29	1	3	0	—		—		—		32	1
Nordsjælland	2026–27	Danish Superliga	7	0	0	0	—		6 (Note: Appearances in UEFA Conference League)	0	—		13	0
Nordsjælland	Total		47	1	3	0	—		6	0	—		56	1
Career total			268	17	26	2	2	1	14	0	6	0	328	20

== Honours ==
Individual

- Superliga Team of the Month: September 2023
