= Arnór Smárason =

Icelandic footballer

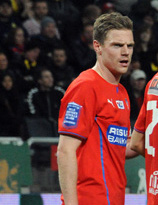
- Arnór playing for Helsingborg in 2013

Personal information
- Date of birth: 7 September 1988 (age 38)
- Place of birth: Akranes, Iceland
- Height: 1.84 m (6 ft 1/2 in)
- Position: Attacking midfielder

Youth career
- 1996–2003: ÍA Akranes
- 2003: Molde
- 2003–2004: ÍA Akranes
- 2004–2008: Heerenveen

Senior career*
Years	Team	Apps	(Gls)
2008–2010	Heerenveen	25	(5)
2010–2013	Esbjerg	60	(14)
2013–2015	Helsingborg	55	(12)
2015	→ Torpedo Moscow (loan)	11	(2)
2016–2018	Hammarby IF	60	(9)
2018–2020	Lillestrøm	36	(11)
2021–2023	Valur	30	(6)
2023–2024	ÍA Akranes	39	(6)

International career
2003–2004	Iceland U-17	11	(2)
2005–2007	Iceland U-19	16	(5)
2007–2011	Iceland U-21	10	(2)
2008–2019	Iceland	26	(3)
- * Club domestic league appearances and goals

Arnór Smárason (born 7 September 1988) is an Icelandic former footballer. He played in all the positions on the midfield.

== Early life ==
Arnór was born in Akranes, Iceland, and is a cousin of Pétur Pétursson. He started his football career at the local club ÍA Akranes, before moving to Norway at age 15 together with his family. He played a year with Molde FK as his father was attending Molde University College, before returning to Iceland. A year later, Arnór moved to the Netherlands to join up with the youth teams of SC Heerenveen, following a successful trial.

== Club career ==
=== Hereenveen ===
Arnór signed his first professional contract with Hereenveen on 9 September 2007, aged 19. He made his senior debut the same season, during the spring of 2008, whilst also signing a new three-year deal with the Eredivisie side.

During the following season, in 2008–09, Arnór became a regular starter for Heerenveen. He made his continental debut for the club in the Europa League on 18 September 2008, coming on as a late sub in a 1–1 draw against the Portuguese side Vitória. Nearly a month later, on 19 October 2008, Arnór scored his first competitive goal for the club in a 2–2 draw against Roda. That season Heerenveen finished 5th in the Eredivisie and went all the way to the final in the KNVB Cup. They eventually won against Twente, 2–2 after full-time and 5–4 on penalties, though Arnór remained on the bench as an unused sub. In all, Arnór played 27 games for Hereenveen during the season and scored 5 goals.

Due to a serious back injury, Arnór missed most of the 2009–10 league play. He was sent to the clinic of Bayern Munich club doctor Hans-Wilhelm Müller-Wohlfahrt, who treated him during the spring of 2010. He returned to the pitch in March the same year, playing two competitive games throughout the season. At the same time, Heerenveen communicated that Arnór would leave the club as a free transfer the upcoming summer, due to the club's financial difficulties.

=== Esbjerg ===
In June 2010, he moved to Esbjerg fB in Denmark. Arnór signed a three-year deal with the Superliga club. He went straight into Esbjerg's first team and played his first game in the opening round of the 2010-11 season, a 0–3 loss against Odense. He scored his first goal for the club on 28 August 2010 against Silkeborg, in a 2–1 win. He went on to play 24 of Esbjerg's 33 games in the league, when the team disappointingly finished at the foot of the table and was relegated to the 1st Division.

Esbjerg made a quick return to the Danish top tier. With six rounds left of the 2011–12 Danish 1st Division, they were crowned champions and had already won their promotion. Arnór played 19 games for his side throughout the season, being used as a rotation player, scoring 5 goals.

Arnór started his first game of the 2012–13 season in the third round against SønderjyskE, where he scored in 1–3 loss. In the same game, Arnór attracted a knee injury that kept him sidelined during the fall of 2012. He made his come back on 8 November in a Danish Cup fixture against Aalborg, 0–0 after full-time and 4–2 on penalties, where Arnór slotted home his kick from the spot. After a tough winter with limited playing time, Arnór broke into the starting eleven during the end of the campaign, starting in Esbjerg's last 7 games of the season, in which he scored 5 goals. On 9 May 2013, Esbjerg won the Danish Cup following a 1–0 victory against Randers in the final. Arnór was picked in the starting eleven and was subbed off during extra time. During the summer of 2013, he parted ways with Esbjerg at the end of his contract, on mutual consent.

=== Helsingborgs IF and loan spell at Torpedo Moscow ===
In July 2013, Arnór moved to Helsingborgs IF in Sweden on a three-and-a-half-year deal. He was sought out as a replacement for Alejandro Bedoya, who had recently been sold to the French club Nantes. At the time of his arrival, midway through the 2013 season, Helsingborg was situated 2nd in the Allsvenskan table. Arnór made his debut for the side on 15 July, in a 3–0 win against Östers IF. His first goal for the club came only weeks later, on 5 August, in a 1–2 away loss against Djurgårdens IF. Eventually, Helsingborg dropped off from the top positions and finished 5th in Allsvenskan. Arnór played 14 competitive games during the season, scoring 4 goals.

During the 2014 Allsvenskan, Arnór played 27 out of 30 games in the league, scoring 3 goals. In addition, he had a successful run in the Svenska Cupen, scoring 2 goals in 6 fixtures as Helsingborg made it all the way to the final. On 18 May 2014, his side lost the final against Elfsborg with a score of 0–1.

Ahead of the 2015 season, with two years left on his contract, Arnór was loaned to FC Torpedo Moscow in the Russian Football Premier League. In his debut on 15 March 2015 against Zenit Saint Petersburg, he scored an added-time scissor kick to equalise for his team in a 1–1 draw. In May 2015, the whole Torpedo squad went on strike due to their wages being unpaid since the start of the year. The team was then situated at the foot of the league. In all, Arnór played 11 games during his six month-loan spell at Torpedo, scoring 2 goals.

In the summer of 2015, Arnór returned to Helsingborg, only to be deemed surplus to requirements (due to his reported high salary) by then manager Henrik Larsson. Due to injuries in the squad, however, Arnór returned to the starting eleven and scored a long-range strike in a 3–1 win against AIK on 19 July 2015. He kept his place in the team throughout the rest of the season, scoring 5 goals in 14 matches and becoming Helsingborg's second best top scorer in the league.

=== Hammarby IF ===
On 10 December 2015, he signed for the Stockholm-based club Hammarby IF on a three-year deal. He reportedly moved on a free transfer, even though he had one year left on his contract with Helsingborg. He made his debut for Hammarby on 26 February 2016, in a 0–0 draw against Syrianska FC in the Svenska Cupen. A month later, Arnór scored a spectacular volley against fierce rivals AIK in the quarter final of the Svenska Cupen. Hammarby won the game on penalties after goalkeeper Ögmundur Kristinsson, a fellow countryman of Arnór, scored the decisive kick. During his first league season at the club, Arnór quickly established himself as a regular starter, making 27 appearances and scoring 4 goals.

At the beginning of 2017, under the reign of new manager Jakob Michelsen, Arnór Smárason was appointed as the new vice captain at Hammarby. He remained a starter for the team during the season, scoring 5 goals in 29 league games. However, in 2018 he was used sparingly by Hammarby and left the club on 27 July, signing with Lillestrøm SK in Eliteserien.

== International career ==
Arnór Smárason was first called up to the Iceland U21s in 2007, making 10 appearances while scoring twice during the next four years.

He made his debut in the senior national team in a friendly against Wales on 21 May 2008, in a 0–1 loss. Arnór scored his first international goal for his country in a 2–0 friendly win against Liechtenstein on 11 February 2009.

Iceland qualified for their first major tournament, the UEFA Euro in France, in 2016. Arnór was, however, not called up to the squad by manager Lars Lagerbäck.

== Career statistics ==
=== Club ===
As of match played 11 December 2019

Appearances and goals by club, season and competition
Club	Season	League			National Cup		Other		Total	
Club	Season	Division	Apps	Goals	Apps	Goals	Apps	Goals	Apps	Goals
Heerenveen	2007–08	Eredivisie	2	0	0	0	1 (Note: Appearance in Eredivisie European play-offs)	0	3	0
Heerenveen	2008–09	Eredivisie	21	5	3	0	5 (Note: Appearances in UEFA Cup)	0	29	5
Heerenveen	2009–10	Eredivisie	2	0	0	0	—		2	0
Heerenveen	Total		25	5	3	0	6	0	34	5
Esbjerg	2010–11	Superliga	24	3	2	1	—		26	4
Esbjerg	2011–12	1st Division	18	5	3	0	—		21	5
Esbjerg	2012–13	Superliga	18	6	5	0	—		23	6
Esbjerg	Total		60	14	10	1	—		70	15
Helsingborg	2013	Allsvenskan	15	4	1	1	—		16	5
Helsingborg	2014	Allsvenskan	26	3	6	2	—		32	5
Helsingborg	2015	Allsvenskan	14	5	1	1	—		15	6
Helsingborg	Total		55	12	8	4	—		63	16
Torpedo Moscow (loan)	2014–15	Russian Premier League	11	2	0	0	—		11	2
Hammarby	2016	Allsvenskan	27	4	5	1	—		32	5
Hammarby	2017	Allsvenskan	29	5	4	0	—		33	5
Hammarby	2018	Allsvenskan	4	0	0	0	—		4	0
Hammarby	Total		60	9	9	1	—		69	10
Lillestrøm	2018	Eliteserien	13	7	1	0	—		14	7
Lillestrøm	2019	Eliteserien	23	4	1	0	—		24	4
Lillestrøm	2020	1. divisjon	0	0	0	0	—		0	0
Lillestrøm	Total		36	11	2	0	—		38	11
Career total			247	53	32	6	6	0	285	59

=== International goals ===
Scores and results list Iceland's goal tally first.

#	Date	Venue	Opponent	Score	Result	Competition
1.	11 February 2009	La Manga Stadium, Cartagena, Spain	Liechtenstein	1–0	2–0	Friendly
2.	24 February 2012	Nagai Stadium, Osaka, Japan	Japan	1–3	1–3	Friendly
3.	14 January 2018	Gelora Bung Karno Main Stadium, Jakarta, Indonesia	Indonesia	2–1	4–1	Unofficial Friendly

== Honours ==
=== Club ===
SC Heerenveen

- KNVB Cup: 2009

Esbjerg fB

- 1st Division: 2011–12
- Danish Cup: 2012–13
