= Maura, Norway =

Coordinates: 60°15′N 11°01′E

- Village
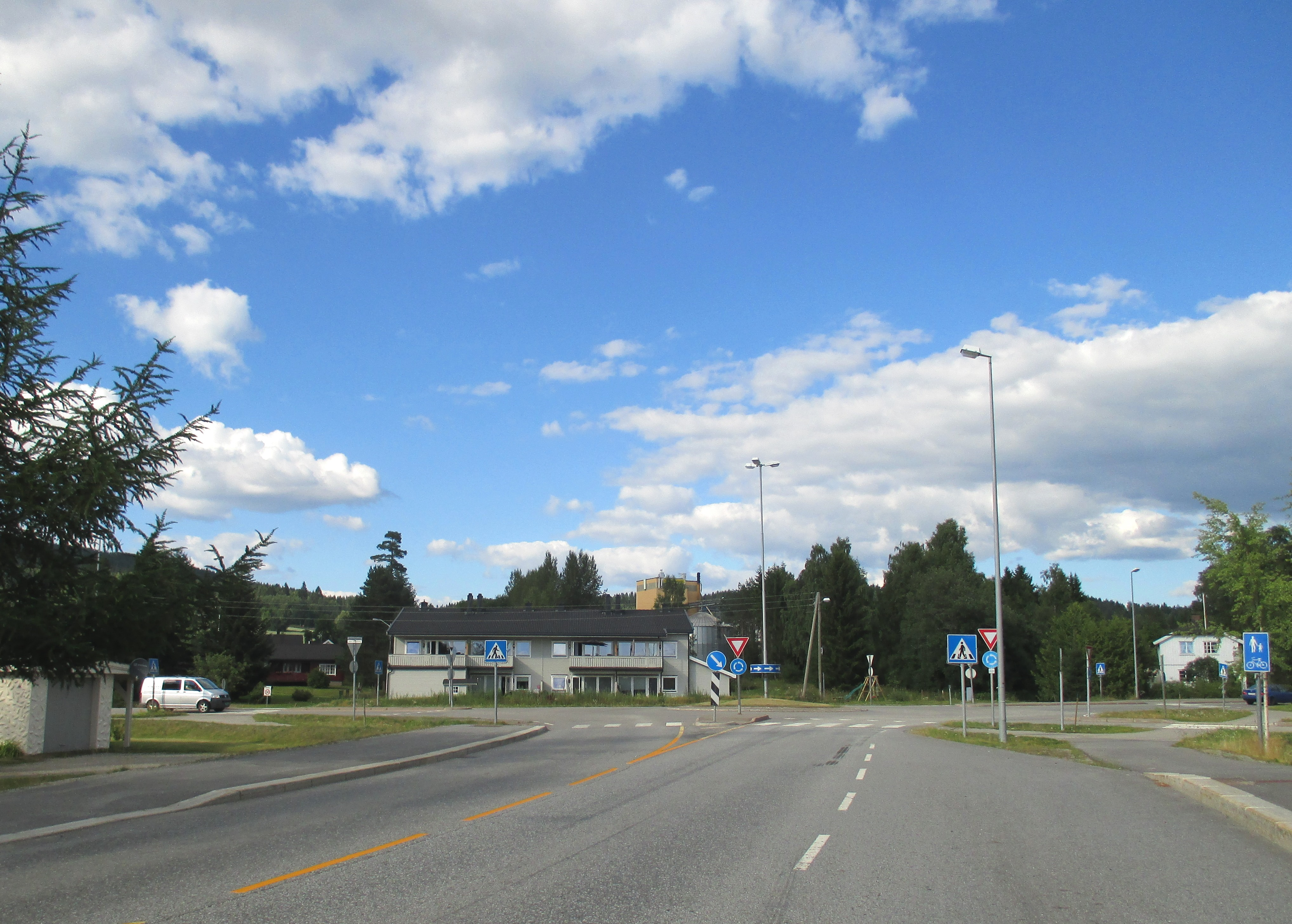

- Location in Akershus
- Country: Norway
- Region: Østlandet
- County: Akershus
- Time zone: UTC+01:00 (CET)
  - Summer (DST): UTC+02:00 (CEST)

Maura is a village in the municipality of Nannestad, Norway. It is located a few kilometres north of Oslo Airport. Its population (2020) is 4,224.
