= Moses Ebiye =

Nigerian professional footballer

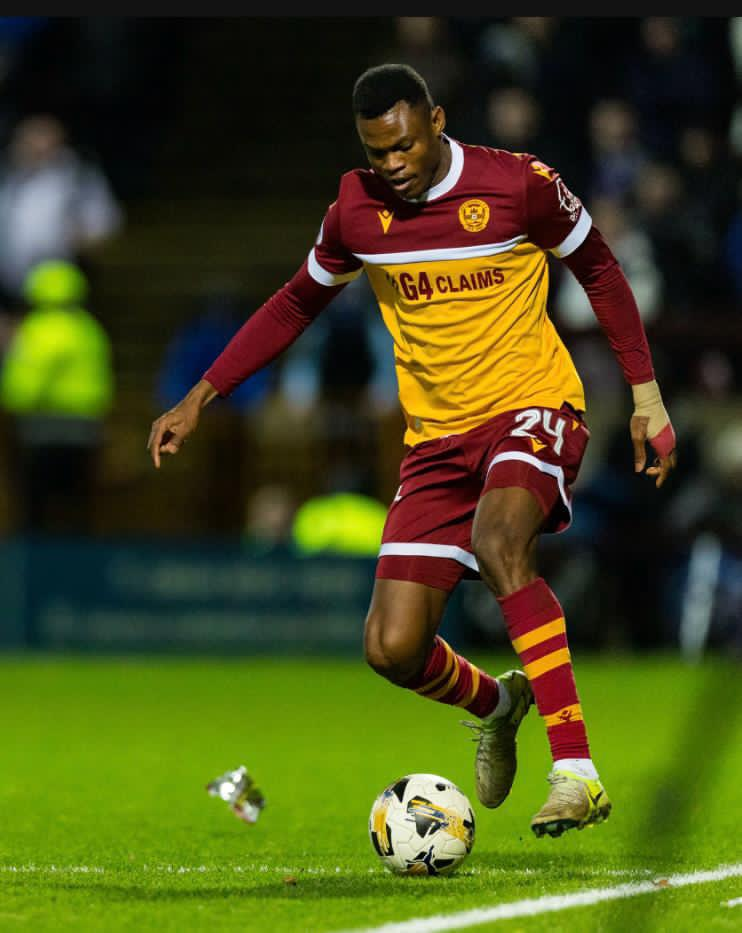
- Moses in action for Motherwell

Personal information
- Full name: Moses Ebiye
- Date of birth: 28 April 1997 (age 29)
- Place of birth: Warri, Nigeria
- Height: 1.85 m (6 ft 1 in)
- Position: Forward

Team information
- Current team: HB Tórshavn
- Number: 20

Senior career*
Years	Team	Apps	(Gls)
- Akwa United
2017–2020	Lillestrøm	42	(3)
2018	→ Strømmen (loan)	12	(6)
2020–2021	Hamkam	15	(4)
2021–2022	Tromsø	39	(10)
2022–2024	Aalesund	30	(8)
2024–2025	Motherwell	33	(5)
2026–	HB Tórshavn	19	(7)
- * Club domestic league appearances and goals as of 1 November 2026

Moses Ebiye (born 28 April 1997) is a Nigerian professional footballer who plays as a forward for Faroe Islands Premier League club HB Tórshavn.

== Career ==
=== Club ===
In July 2017, Ebiye signed a four-year contract with Tippeligaen side Lillestrøm. In the summer of 2018 Ebiye went on loan to Strømmen. He returned to Lillestrøm at the end of 2018. In September 2020, Ebiye signed with 1. divisjon side Hamkam.

=== Motherwell ===
On 5 March 2024, Motherwell announced the signing of free-agent Ebiye on a contract until the summer of 2025. On 16 June 2025, Motherwell confirmed that Ebiye had left the club after his contracts hadn't been renewed.

=== HB Tórshavn ===
On 11 April 2026, HB Tórshavn announced the signing of Ebiye.

== Career statistics ==
=== Club ===
As of match played 13 September 2026

Appearances and goals by club, season and competition
Club	Season	League			National Cup		League Cup		Continental		Other		Total	
Club	Season	Division	Apps	Goals	Apps	Goals	Apps	Goals	Apps	Goals	Apps	Goals	Apps	Goals
Lillestrøm	2017	Eliteserien	8	0	0	0	-		-		-		8	0
Lillestrøm	2018	Eliteserien	7	0	1	0	-		-		1	0	9	0
Lillestrøm	2019	Eliteserien	12	1	2	0	-		-		-		14	1
Lillestrøm	2020	OBOS-ligaen	15	2	0	0	-		-		-		15	2
Lillestrøm	Total		42	3	3	0	-	-	-	-	1	0	46	3
Strømmen (loan)	2018	OBOS-ligaen	12	6	0	0	-		-		-		12	6
Strømmen (loan)	Total		12	6	0	0	-	-	-	-	0	0	12	6
HamKam	2020	OBOS-ligaen	15	4	0	0	-		-		-		15	4
HamKam	Total		15	4	0	0	-	-	-	-	0	0	15	4
Tromsø	2021	Eliteserien	23	8	2	1	-		-		-		25	9
Tromsø	2022	Eliteserien	16	2	2	1	-		-		-		18	3
Tromsø	Total		39	10	4	2	-	-	-	-	0	0	43	12
Aalesund	2022	Eliteserien	12	5	0	0	-		-		-		12	5
Aalesund	2023	Eliteserien	18	3	1	0	-		-		-		19	3
Aalesund	Total		30	8	1	0	-	-	-	-	0	0	31	8
Motherwell	2023–24	Scottish Premiership	6	2	0	0	0	0	-		-		6	2
Motherwell	2024–25	Scottish Premiership	25	2	1	0	6	2	-		-		32	4
Motherwell	Total		31	4	1	0	6	2	-	-	-	-	38	6
HB Tórshavn	2026	Faroe Islands Premier League	15	5	4	0	-		1	0	-		20	5
HB Tórshavn	Total		15	5	4	0	-	-	1	0	-	-	20	5
Career total			184	40	13	2	6	2	1	0	1	0	205	44
