= Ifeanyi Mathew =

Nigerian footballer

Personal information
- Full name: Ifeanyi Mathew
- Date of birth: 20 January 1997 (age 29)
- Place of birth: Kano, Nigeria
- Height: 1.73 m (5 ft 8 in)
- Position: Midfielder

Team information
- Current team: Neftçi
- Number: 18

Senior career*
Years	Team	Apps	(Gls)
	El-Kanemi Warriors	13	(2)
2016	Kano Pillars	21	(4)
2016–2023	Lillestrøm	167	(13)
2019	→ Osmanlıspor (loan)	10	(0)
2023–2025	FC Zürich	71	(5)
2025-	Neftçi	26	(3)
- * Club domestic league appearances and goals as of 22 June 2026

Ifeanyi Mathew (born 20 January 1997) is a Nigerian professional footballer who plays for Azerbaijan Premier League club Neftçi.

== Career ==
=== Club ===
In July 2016, Mathew signed a four-year contract with Tippeligaen side Lillestrøm.

== Career statistics ==
=== Club ===
As of match played 19 July 2022

Appearances and goals by club, season and competition
Club	Season	League			National Cup		Continental		Other		Total	
Club	Season	Division	Apps	Goals	Apps	Goals	Apps	Goals	Apps	Goals	Apps	Goals
Lillestrøm	2016	Tippeligaen	8	2	0	0	-		-		8	2
Lillestrøm	2017	Eliteserien	30	3	7	1	-		-		37	4
Lillestrøm	2018	Eliteserien	30	4	6	3	2	0	1	0	39	7
Lillestrøm	2019	Eliteserien	11	0	0	0	-		-		11	0
Lillestrøm	2020	OBOS-ligaen	29	0	0	0	-		-		29	0
Lillestrøm	2021	Eliteserien	30	2	2	1	-		-		32	3
Lillestrøm	2022	Eliteserien	15	2	3	1	-		-		18	3
Lillestrøm	Total		153	13	18	6	2	0	1	0	174	19
Osmanlıspor (loan)	2018–19	TFF First League	10	0	0	0	-		-		8	2
Osmanlıspor (loan)	Total		10	0	0	0	-	-	-	-	10	0
Career total			163	13	18	6	2	0	1	0	184	19

== Honours ==
Individual

- Norwegian First Division Player of the Month: November 2020
