= Raphael Ayagwa =

Nigerian footballer (born 1998)

Personal information
- Full name: Raphael Viashima Ayagwa
- Date of birth: 13 February 1998 (age 28)
- Place of birth: Gboko, Nigeria
- Height: 6 ft 0 in (1.82 m)
- Position: Midfielder

Team information
- Current team: Al-Hilal SCSC

Senior career*
Years	Team	Apps	(Gls)
2016–2017	Lobi Stars	14	(0)
2017–2018	Plateau United	6	(1)
2018–2019	Lillestrøm	3	(0)
2019–2020	Lobi Stars	9	(0)
2020–2021	FC Tulsa	31	(0)
2021–2022	Lobi Stars	19	(2)
2022–2023	Aswan	26	(0)
2023–	Al-Hilal SCSC	0	(0)

International career
2017	Nigeria	1	(0)
- * Club domestic league appearances and goals as of 10:10, 16 July 2024 (UTC)

Raphael Viashima Ayagwa (born 13 February 1998) is a Nigerian professional footballer who plays as a midfielder for Libyan Premier League club Al-Hilal SCSC.

== Club career ==
Lobi Stars FC 2016-2017

Raphael Ayagwa used to play for Plateau United F.C. in Jos, Plateau state, before he signed for Norwegian side Lillestrøm on 15 August 2018. He left the club on 25 June 2019 after getting his contract terminated by mutual consent.

On 11 January 2020, Ayagwa joined USL Championship side FC Tulsa.

=== International career ===
Ayagwa was called up for the Nigerian national team and made a single appearance for Nigeria against Benin on 19 August 2017.
