= Charles Ezeh =

Nigerian footballer (born 1997)

Personal information
- Full name: Charles Chinedu Ezeh
- Date of birth: 18 November 1997 (age 28)
- Place of birth: Jos, Nigeria
- Height: 1.95 m (6 ft 5 in)
- Position: Midfielder

Team information
- Current team: Kano Pillars Football Club

Youth career
- Gee-Lec Football Academy

Senior career*
Years	Team	Apps	(Gls)
2017–2021	Lillestrøm	18	(0)
2018	→ Strømmen (loan)	10	(0)
2019	→ Hamkam (loan)	9	(0)
2019	→ Skeid (loan)	13	(0)
2020	→ Øygarden (loan)	23	(1)
2023-	Kom Podgorica	21	(0)
- * Club domestic league appearances and goals as of 19 May 2024

Charles Chinedu Ezeh (born 18 November 1997) is a Nigerian footballer who plays as a midfielder for Kano Pillars Football Club in the Nigeria Premier Football League.

== Career ==
In July 2017, Ezeh signed a four-year contract with Tippeligaen side Lillestrøm. In summer 2018, he went on loan to Strømmen. He returned to Lillestrøm at the end of 2018, only to move on to Hamkam on loan. In spring 2021, Lillestrøm decided to release him when his contract expired on 30 June.

== Career statistics ==
As of match played 13 December 2020

Appearances and goals by club, season and competition
Club	Season	League			National Cup		Continental		Total	
Club	Season	Division	Apps	Goals	Apps	Goals	Apps	Goals	Apps	Goals
Lillestrøm	2017	Eliteserien	11	0	3	0	—		14	0
Lillestrøm	2018	Eliteserien	7	0	4	0	—		11	0
Lillestrøm	2021	Eliteserien	0	0	0	0	—		0	0
Lillestrøm	Total		18	0	7	0	—		25	0
Strømmen (loan)	2018	Norwegian First Division	10	0	0	0	—		10	0
HamKam (loan)	2019	Norwegian First Division	9	0	2	0	—		11	0
Skeid (loan)	2019	Norwegian First Division	13	0	0	0	—		13	0
Øygarden (loan)	2020	Norwegian First Division	23	1	0	0	—		23	1
Career total			73	1	9	0	0	0	82	1
