= Martin Falkeborn =

Swedish footballer

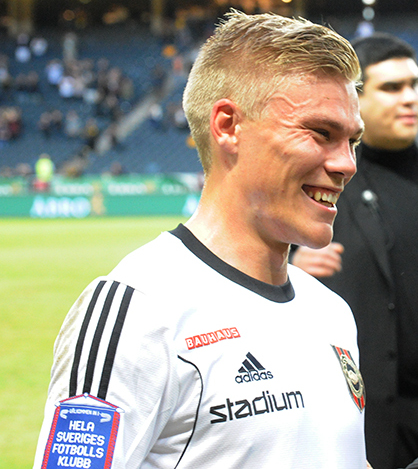

Personal information
- Full name: Martin Filip Falkeborn
- Date of birth: 8 January 1993 (age 33)
- Place of birth: Sweden
- Height: 1.82 m (5 ft 11 1/2 in)
- Position: Right-back

Youth career
- –2003: Ekerö IK
- 2003–2010: Brommapojkarna

Senior career*
| Years | Team | Apps | (Gls) |
| 2010–2015 | Brommapojkarna | 26 | (0) |
| 2011 | → Akropolis (loan) | 8 | (0) |
| 2015–2016 | Egersund | 25 | (1) |
| 2016–2018 | Lillestrøm | 0 | (0) |
| 2016 | → Ull/Kisa (loan) | 11 | (2) |
| 2017–2018 | → Frej (loan) | 38 | (5) |
| 2019 | Syrianska | 23 | (0) |
| 2020 | Akropolis | 19 | (0) |
| 2021–2022 | Brommapojkarna | 19 | (1) |
| 2023–2025 | Europa Point | 37 | (0) |

Managerial career
- 2024–2025: Europa Point (player-head coach)
- * Club domestic league appearances and goals as of 18:47, 12 January 2025 (UTC+1)

Martin Falkeborn (born 8 January 1993) is a Swedish footballer who plays as a right back for Europa Point in the Gibraltar Football League.
