= Daniel A. Pedersen =

Danish footballer (born 1992)

Personal information
- Full name: Daniel Alexander Pedersen
- Date of birth: 27 July 1992 (age 34)
- Place of birth: Silkeborg, Denmark
- Height: 1.85 m (6 ft 1 in)
- Position: Defensive midfielder

Youth career
- Galten FS
- Silkeborg

Senior career*
| Years | Team | Apps | (Gls) |
| 2011–2015 | Silkeborg | 112 | (4) |
| 2015–2018 | AGF | 74 | (0) |
| 2018–2019 | Lillestrøm | 37 | (2) |
| 2020–2022 | Brann | 33 | (3) |
| 2022–2023 | Orange County | 39 | (3) |
| 2023–2026 | AB | 34 | (2) |
| 2026 | → Fremad Amager (loan) | 7 | (0) |
| Total | | 336 | (14) |

International career
| 2011–2012 | Denmark U20 | 6 | (0) |
| 2012–2013 | Denmark U21 | 6 | (0) |
- * Club domestic league appearances and goals

Daniel Alexander Pedersen (born 27 July 1992) is a retired Danish professional footballer.

== Career ==
Pedersen signed his first full-time contract with Silkeborg IF just before he turned 19.

Before Pedersen even had his debut, he was elected for the Danish U20 national football team and played four games before he was put on the Danish U21 national football team. Pedersen debuted for Silkeborg IF August 21, 2011, in a game against HB Køge. The week later, he was chosen to start away against the defending champions, FC Copenhagen.

During his first season, Pedersen showed how he is able to play many positions, also on the midfield. He scored his first goal against FC Midtjylland in a 2–2 draw; his goal was later nominated to goal of the year in the Danish Superliga.

On 7 August 2018, it was confirmed that Pedersen had signed a contract with the Norwegian club Lillestrøm SK.

Pederson joined USL Championship club Orange County SC on 3 February 2022. On 6 July 2023, Pedersen returned to Denmark and joined Danish 2nd Division club AB.

After two and a half years at AB, it was confirmed on 4 January 2026 that Pedersen had been loaned to fellow league club Fremad Amager until the end of the season.

== Career statistics ==
=== Club ===
As of match played 17 October 2021

Appearances and goals by club, season and competition
| Club | Season | League | | | National Cup | | Europe | | Total | |
| Club | Season | Division | Apps | Goals | Apps | Goals | Apps | Goals | Apps | Goals |
|---|---|---|---|---|---|---|---|---|---|---|
| Silkeborg | 2011–12 | Danish Superliga | 26 | 1 | 1 | 0 | – | | 27 | 1 |
| Silkeborg | 2012–13 | Danish Superliga | 29 | 0 | 1 | 0 | – | | 30 | 0 |
| Silkeborg | 2013–14 | NordicBet Liga | 30 | 2 | 0 | 0 | – | | 30 | 2 |
| Silkeborg | 2014–15 | Danish Superliga | 27 | 1 | 0 | 0 | – | | 27 | 1 |
| Silkeborg | Total | | 112 | 4 | 2 | 0 | - | - | 114 | 4 |
| AGF | 2015–16 | Danish Superliga | 24 | 0 | 5 | 0 | – | | 29 | 0 |
| AGF | 2016–17 | Danish Superliga | 22 | 0 | 1 | 0 | – | | 23 | 0 |
| AGF | 2017–18 | Danish Superliga | 28 | 0 | 0 | 0 | – | | 28 | 0 |
| AGF | Total | | 74 | 0 | 6 | 0 | - | - | 80 | 0 |
| Lillestrøm | 2018 | Eliteserien | 13 | 0 | 2 | 0 | – | | 15 | 0 |
| Lillestrøm | 2019 | Eliteserien | 24 | 2 | 2 | 1 | – | | 26 | 3 |
| Lillestrøm | Total | | 37 | 2 | 4 | 1 | - | - | 41 | 3 |
| Brann | 2020 | Eliteserien | 19 | 2 | 0 | 0 | – | | 19 | 2 |
| Brann | 2021 | Eliteserien | 14 | 1 | 3 | 3 | – | | 17 | 4 |
| Brann | Total | | 33 | 3 | 3 | 3 | - | - | 36 | 6 |
| Career total | | | 256 | 9 | 15 | 4 | - | - | 271 | 13 |
