= Fredrik Krogstad =

Norwegian footballer (born 1995)

Personal information
- Date of birth: 6 June 1995 (age 31)
- Place of birth: Oslo, Norway
- Height: 1.81 m (5 ft 11 in)
- Position: Midfielder

Team information
- Current team: Stabæk
- Number: 21

Youth career
- Vestli
- –2011: Lyn
- 2012–2013: Lørenskog

Senior career*
Years	Team	Apps	(Gls)
2013–2014	Lørenskog	32	(4)
2015–2021	Lillestrøm	146	(16)
2016	→ Ullensaker/Kisa (loan)	29	(10)
2022–2023	Stabæk	58	(8)
2024	Korona Kielce	7	(0)
2024–2026	Hvidovre	53	(1)
2026–	Stabæk	10	(1)
- * Club domestic league appearances and goals as of 14 November 2026

Fredrik Krogstad (born 6 June 1995) is a Norwegian professional footballer who plays as a midfielder for OBOS-ligaen club Stabæk.

He played youth football for Vestli, Lyn and Lørenskog. In 2013, he made his senior debut for Lørenskog, and signed with Lillestrøm ahead of the 2015 season. He made his first-team debut in April 2015 against Start.

He spent the first half of the 2016 season on loan in Ullensaker/Kisa.

After leaving Stabæk at the end of 2023, Krogstad remained a free agent until 2 April 2024, when he joined Polish Ekstraklasa club Korona Kielce on a three-month contract. He made his debut ten days later in a 1–0 away loss against Warta Poznań.

In September 2024, Krogstad joined Danish 1st Division club Hvidovre.

On 21 August 2026, Krogstad re-joined Stabæk on a contract until end of 2026.

== Honours ==
Lillestrøm

- Norwegian Cup: 2017

Korona Kielce II

- IV liga Świętokrzyskie: 2023–24
