= Petter Mathias Olsen =

Norwegian footballer (born 1998)

Personal information
- Date of birth: 13 January 1998 (age 28)
- Position: Midfielder

Team information
- Current team: Grorud
- Number: 17

Youth career
- Fjellhamar
- Lillestrøm

Senior career*
| Years | Team | Apps | (Gls) |
| 2015–2019 | Lillestrøm | 2 | (0) |
| 2017 | → Strømmen (loan) | 9 | (0) |
| 2018 | → Strømmen (loan) | 17 | (2) |
| 2019 | → Hamarkameratene (loan) | 9 | (0) |
| 2019 | → Grorud (loan) | 1 | (0) |
| 2020– | Grorud | 0 | (0) |

International career^{‡}
| 2017 | Norway U19 | 4 | (0) |
- * Club domestic league appearances and goals as of 31 May 2020 ‡ National team caps and goals as of 31 May 2020

Petter Mathias Olsen (born 13 January 1998) is a Norwegian football midfielder who currently plays for Grorud on loan from Lillestrøm.
