= Arne Erlandsen =

Norwegian footballer and manager (born 1959)

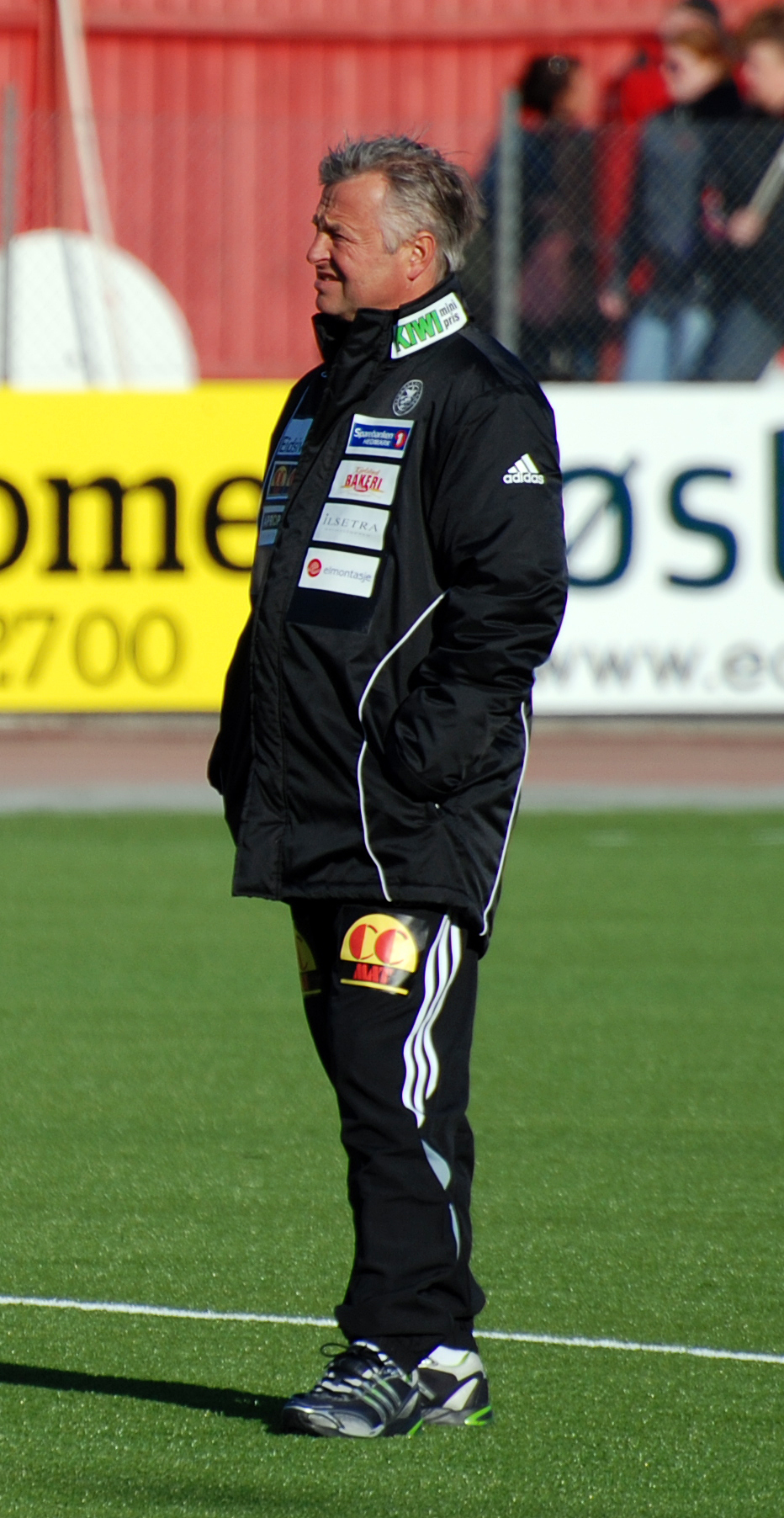

Personal information
- Full name: Arne Erlandsen
- Date of birth: 20 December 1959 (age 66)
- Place of birth: Kløfta, Norway
- Position: Midfielder

Senior career*
Years	Team	Apps	(Gls)
1979–1981	Lillestrøm	42	(10)
1981–1982	Djurgårdens IF	40	(6)
1983–1989	Lillestrøm	122	(26)
1990–1991	Strømsgodset	44	(5)
1992	Lillestrøm	22	(2)
Total		270	(49)

International career
1978–1987	Norway	22	(1)

Managerial career
- Bærum
- 1998–2004: Lillestrøm
- 2005–2006: IFK Göteborg
- 2007–2009: Ham-Kam
- 2010–2012: Ull/Kisa
- 2013–2014: Moss
- 2015: Fredrikstad
- 2016–2018: Lillestrøm
- 2019–2020: KuPS
- 2023: Kvik Halden
- 2023: Skeid
- * Club domestic league appearances and goals

Arne Erlandsen (born 20 December 1959) is a Norwegian football manager and former player. During his own playing career he had relative success as a midfielder, having played for Lillestrøm SK and Swedish team Djurgårdens IF as well as 20 matches for Norway. He managed another Swedish team, IFK Göteborg, between November 2004 and September 2006.

== Coaching career ==
=== Lillestrøm SK ===
Arne Erlandsen took over Lillestrøm SK in 1998. His biggest achievement during this period was an unexpected silver medal in 2001, after having lost the title race to bookies favourites Rosenborg BK.

=== IFK Göteborg ===
During his two seasons in IFK Göteborg, Erlandsen grabbed 76 points in 42 matches, an average of 1.81 points per match. This is the third best performance ever by a Norwegian manager abroad.

=== Ham-Kam ===
On 13 November 2006 Erlandsen was hired as head coach of HamKam, which played in the 2. divisjon. On 11 June 2009 he was fired due to many losses.

During his time in HamKam he managed to coach the team back into the Norwegian top flight on one occasion.

=== Ull/Kisa ===
In the middle of the 2010 season, Erlandsen was appointed by Ullensaker/Kisa as their new head coach. He saved the club from relegation to the 3. divisjon this autumn, and decided to sign for another year.

In 2011 Ullensaker/Kisa was promoted to 1. divisjon for the first time in the club's history. On 16 October 2011, Ull/Kisa secured promotion with a 4–1 win against Tiller IL, when Lørenskog IF at the same time played a 3–3 draw against KFUM Oslo, which meant that Ull/Kisa was five points ahead, with only one match left to play.

In the 2012 season, Ullensaker/Kisa grabbed a qualification spot for promotion to the Tippeligaen. However, Erlandsen's contract expired after the season, and was not renewed.

=== Moss FK ===
Erlandsen signed a short-term contract with Moss in July 2013 to help the team avoid relegation from the 2. divisjon.

=== Fredrikstad FK ===
Erlandsen signed on a season contract with Fredrikstad in May 2015 and succeeded in helping the team to avoid relegation from the 1. divisjon.

=== Lillestrøm SK ===
In September 2016 it was announced that Erlandsen were to go back to his former club Lillestrøm as they were battling against relegation. After three wins, two draws, and one loss, the 57-year old from Kløfta managed to save the spot during the last game of the season, in a 1–0 win over Molde FK. After saving the club from relegation, Lillestrøm could finally celebrate their 100 year-anniversary in their 42nd consecutive season in the top tier of Norwegian football. Lillestrøm won the 2017 Norwegian Football Cup after defeating Sarpsborg 08 3–2 in the final. On 26 June 2018, Erlandsen was sacked after the 14th round of the 2018 season.

=== KuPS ===
In October 2019, Erlandsen was appointed manager for the Finnish champions KuPS.

=== 2023 ===
Ahead of the 2023 season he was hired as the new head coach of third-tier club Kvik Halden FK. Two thirds through the season, Erlandsen was bought out of his contract to become the new head coach of Skeid.

== Honours ==
Djurgårdens IF

- Division 2 Norra: 1982

Lillestrøm Sportsklubb

- Eliteserien: 1986, 1989
- Norwegian Cup: 1985, 2017

Strømsgodset Toppfotball

- Norwegian Cup: 1991
