= Ullensaker/Kisa IL =

Norwegian sports club

Ull/Kisa
- Full name: Ullensaker/Kisa Idrettslag
- Nicknames: Ull/Kisa, Kisa
- Founded: 15 December 1894; 131 years ago
- Ground: Jessheim Stadion
- Capacity: 4,500
- Chairman: Lars Olav Venger-Pedersen
- Head coach: Truls Jørstad
- League: 2. divisjon
- 2024: 2. divisjon group 2, 8th of 14
- Website: https://www.ullkisafotball.no/
Home colours	Away colours

Ullensaker/Kisa IL, commonly referred to as Ull/Kisa, is a Norwegian sports club from Jessheim in Ullensaker. Founded in 1894, it has sections for association football, team handball and athletics.

== General history ==
The club was founded on 15 December 1894. After the Second World War it incorporated the AIF club Ullensaker AIL, founded 1932.

Ull/Kisa plays with a yellow shirt and green shorts. In football, this is completed with yellow stockings.

== Athletics ==
The club has had some Norwegian champions, mostly within running events. An early medal winner was Svein Skolt, who took a national bronze medal in the steeplechase in 1951. A few years later, Berit Dønnum took a double 800 metres title in 1962 and 1963. Tove Dønnum took three straight high jump titles in 1961, 1962 and 1963—and Anne-Mette Olsen took a bronze in 1972.

Thomas Roth became 800 metres champion in 2010 and took the bronze in 2009. Roth also competed in the 2011 European Indoor Championships. Tor-Erik Nyquist took three marathon silvers in 1995, 1996 and 1997 and a half marathon silver in 1999.

Pål Berntzen became javelin champion in 1992. The decathlete Jo Henning Hals-Nilssen took a national bronze in 1992. The decathlete Tom Erik Olsen won a national silver medal in the hurdles in 1995. He later won several national titles for other clubs. Inger Birgitte Reppe took a hurdles bronze in 1988. Else Opsahl, Astrid Willersrud and Ragnhild Sundby won medals in shot put in the 1960s, and Runa Nordahl won a javelin bronze in 1975.

== Football ==
The men's football team currently plays in the Norwegian Second Division, the third tier in the Norwegian football league system.

Its stadium, Jessheim stadion, is quite dilapidated. Therefore, the club is planning a new stadium that will take between 1000 and 5000 spectators.

In May 2009 Ull/Kisa performed well in the 2009 Norwegian Football Cup, upsetting Sandefjord Fotball 1–0 in the second round. The goal was scored by Mats Jarnbjo in the 61st minute. In the third round was Vålerenga Fotball too strong, as Ull/Kisa lost 3–5 at Ullevaal Stadion. Eirik Soltvedt scored all the goals of Ull/Kisa.

In the middle of the 2010 season Arne Erlandsen was appointed by Ull/Kisa as their new coach. He saved the club from relegation to 3. divisjon this autumn, and decided to sign for another year. 2011 was a remarkable year for both Arne Erlandsen and Ull/Kisa. The Jessheim-club promoted to 1. divisjon for the first time in history. October 16, 2011 Ull/Kisa won 4–1 against Tiller IL, when Lørenskog IF at the same time played a 3–3 draw against KFUM Oslo, which meant that Ull/Kisa was five points ahead, with only one match left to play. The match against Tiller IL was the last game the club played at Jessheim Stadion.

=== Recent history ===
Season		Pos.	Pl.	W	D	L	GS	GA	P	Cup	Notes
2006	2. divisjon	6	26	10	9	7	45	43	39	First round	
2007	2. divisjon	6	26	10	6	10	39	47	36	First round	
2008	2. divisjon	2	26	16	7	3	68	26	55	Third round	
2009	2. divisjon	10	26	8	4	14	49	53	28	Third round	
2010	2. divisjon	10	26	9	5	12	43	56	32	First round	
2011	2. divisjon	↑ 1	26	14	9	3	59	38	51	First round	Promoted to the 1. divisjon
2012	1. divisjon	6	30	14	2	14	45	39	44	Third round	
2013	1. divisjon	12	30	9	7	14	46	48	34	Third round	
2014	1. divisjon	↓ 15	30	6	5	19	26	51	23	Third round	Relegated to the 2. divisjon
2015	2. divisjon	↑ 1	26	18	4	4	51	24	58	Second round	Promoted to the 1. divisjon
2016	1. divisjon	12	30	8	8	14	47	50	32	Second round	
2017	1. divisjon	6	30	15	3	12	61	55	48	Third round	
2018	1. divisjon	5	30	11	10	9	59	49	43	Fourth round	
2019	1. divisjon	8	30	11	6	13	47	47	39	Third round	
2020	1. divisjon	12	30	10	5	15	45	63	35	Cancelled	
2021	1. divisjon	↓ 15	30	7	8	15	34	50	29	Second round	Relegated to the 2. divisjon
2022	2. divisjon	2	26	17	5	4	73	36	56	Third round	
2023	2. divisjon	5	26	11	8	7	43	34	41	Third round	

== Current squad ==
As of 1 September 2026

Note: Flags indicate national team as defined under FIFA eligibility rules; some limited exceptions apply. Players may hold more than one non-FIFA nationality.

No.	Pos.	Nation	Player
1	GK	NOR	Cassius Navjord
3	DF	DEN	Emil Bramsen
4	DF	NOR	Sverre Bjørkkjær
5	DF	NOR	Eirik Soleim Brennhaugen
6	DF	NOR	Jesse Boateng
7	MF	NOR	Enok Naustdal
8	MF	NOR	Uros Ignjic
10	FW	NOR	Elias Solberg
11	MF	NOR	Stian Barane
12	GK	NOR	James Møyholm Martinsen
13	MF	AUS	Zaydan Bello
14	MF	NOR	Akenaton Empa
15	FW	NOR	Felix Kutsche Eriksen (on loan from Start)

No.	Pos.	Nation	Player
16	FW	DEN	Andreas Riiser
18	FW	NOR	Soran Ostadi
19	FW	NOR	Nidal Loulanti
20	FW	NOR	Kristoffer Skarpsno
21	MF	NOR	Christopher Kjensteberg
22	DF	NOR	Joachim Prent-Eckbo (on loan from KFUM-Oslo)
23	DF	NOR	Patrick Alfei Sæbø
24	MF	NOR	Eirik Bjørnsengen
25	MF	NOR	Saad Ali Butt
26	MF	NOR	Daniel Lyngstad
27	FW	NOR	Adrian Sørensen
31	GK	NOR	Jørgen Sveinhaug
