= 2017 Norwegian Football Cup =

Tournament details
- Country: Norway
- Teams: 272 (overall); 128 (main competition)

Final positions
- Champions: Lillestrøm (6th title)
- Runners-up: Sarpsborg 08

Tournament statistics
- Matches played: 123
- Goals scored: 451 (3.67 per match)
- Top goal scorer(s): Matthías Vilhjálmsson (8 goals)

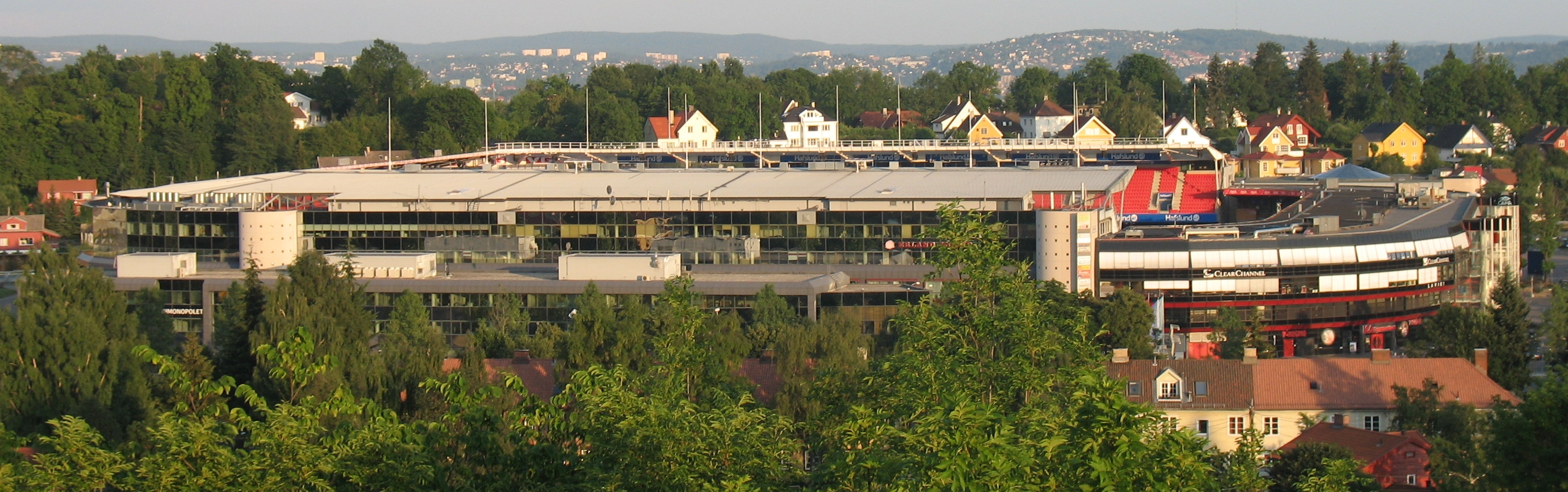
Ullevaal Stadion, Oslo - venue for the Norwegian Cup final

The 2017 Norwegian Football Cup was the 112th season of the Norwegian annual knock-out football tournament. It began with qualification matches in March and April 2017. The first round was played on 26 April 2017 and the tournament concluded with the final on 3 December 2017.

Lillestrøm won their 6th Cup title and qualified for a place in the second qualifying round of the 2018–19 UEFA Europa League.

== Calendar ==
Below are the dates for each round as given by the official schedule:

Round	Main date	Number of fixtures	Clubs
First Qualifying Round	29 March 2017	96	272 → 176
Second Qualifying Round	4 April 2017	48	176 → 128
First Round	25–27 April 2017	64	128 → 64
Second Round	24 May 2017	32	64 → 32
Third Round	31 May 2017	16	32 → 16
Fourth Round	9 August 2017	8	16 → 8
Quarter-finals	27 August 2017	4	8 → 4
Semi-finals	20–21 September 2017	2	4 → 2
Final	3 December 2017	1	2 → 1

== First round ==
Number of teams per tier entering this round
Eliteserien (1)	1. divisjon (2)	2. divisjon (3)	3. divisjon (4)	4. divisjon (5)	Total
16 / 16	16 / 16	26 / 28	54 / 84	16 / 295	128 / 439

25 April 2017	Løten FK (5)	0–4	(2) Kongsvinger	Løten
18:00 CEST (UTC+2)		Report	Castro 4', 14', 38'; Vinjor 34'	Stadium: Løten kunstgress Referee: Ajdin Medic

25 April 2017	Tynset (4)	3–1	(4) Orkla	Tynset
17:15 CEST (UTC+2)	Andresen 11', 54' (pen.); Thoresen 33'	Report	Helgetun 82'	Stadium: Nytrømoen; Attendance: 220; Referee: Dag Erik Tangvik

26 April 2017	Steinkjer (4)	1–3	(2) Levanger	Steinkjer
18:00 CEST (UTC+2)	Sivertsen 44'	Report	Udoh 17'; Lykke Strand 40'; Aas 73'	Stadium: Guldbergaunet Stadion; Attendance: 378; Referee: Robert Eggen

26 April 2017	Tønsberg (4)	3–5 (a.e.t.)	(2) Arendal	Tønsberg
18:00 CEST (UTC+2)	Østli 30'; Wallem 85'; Rygel 90+3'	Report	Pepa 5'; Ibrahimaj 16', 97'; Ness 90+1'; Ta Hso Wha Dwe 117'	Stadium: Tønsberg Gressbane; Attendance: 203; Referee: Ole-Alexander Ekeli Valen

26 April 2017	Halsen (4)	1–2 (a.e.t.)	(3) Notodden	Larvik
18:00 CEST (UTC+2)	Smith 90'	Report	Midtgarden 82', 120'	Stadium: Bergeskogen KG; Attendance: 125; Referee: Espen Samuelsen

26 April 2017	Os (4)	1–4	(3) Nest-Sotra	Osøyro
18:00 CEST (UTC+2)	Fosen 50'	Report	Rødsand 4'; Nergaard 12'; Dang 52'; Vetti 88'	Stadium: Kuventræ; Attendance: 250; Referee: Svein Tore Sinnes

26 April 2017	Lyngen/Karnes (5)	0–2	(2) Tromsdalen	Lyngseidet
18:00 CEST (UTC+2)		Report	Mienna 2', 90'	Stadium: Geitnes kunstgress Attendance: 67; Referee: Kristian Kristiansen

26 April 2017	Strindheim (4)	0–2	(1) Rosenborg	Trondheim
18:00 CEST (UTC+2)		Report	Vilhjálmsson 9', 77'	Stadium: Strindheim kunstgress Attendance: 750; Referee: Kent Gomo Hammer

26 April 2017	Kråkerøy (4)	1–0	(2) Fredrikstad	Kråkerøy
18:00 CEST (UTC+2)	Stafseng 22'	Report		Stadium: Kråkerøy Stadium; Attendance: 1,438; Referee: Henrik Andreas Grenå Pettersen

26 April 2017	Trott (5)	0–4	(2) Åsane	Stord
18:00 CEST (UTC+2)		Report	Songve 12'; Aslaksen 36'; Hagos 46'; Manzon 76'	Stadium: Prestegardsskogen gras Attendance: 200; Referee: Anders Birch Hansen

26 April 2017	Fløy (4)	2–0	(3) Vindbjart	Kristiansand
18:00 CEST (UTC+2)	Tveit 56'; Andersen 67' (pen.)	Report		Stadium: Flekkerøy stadion Attendance: 744; Referee: Sander Magdalon Bråten Johannessen

26 April 2017	Bjarg (5)	0–1	(3) Fana	Bergen
18:00 CEST (UTC+2)		Report	Aall Tveit 44' (o.g.)	Stadium: Stavollen Kunstgress; Attendance: 280; Referee: Ola Kellerhals

26 April 2017	Kjelsås (3)	4–0	(4) Frigg Oslo	Oslo
18:00 CEST (UTC+2)	Aslaksrud 40', 77'; Fasting 82'; Haberg 89'	Report		Stadium: Grefsen Stadion; Attendance: 80; Referee: Stian Røvig Sletner

26 April 2017	Lura (4)	1–4 (a.e.t.)	(2) Sandnes Ulf	Lura
18:00 CEST (UTC+2)	Bjørnå 25'	Report	Kristoffersen 85'; Geertsen 96'; Nisja 107'; Eriksen 109'	Stadium: Lura stadion Attendance: 1,002; Referee: Mischa Kellerhals

26 April 2017	Sola (4)	1–4	(3) Vard Haugesund	Sola
18:00 CEST (UTC+2)	Marknesse 75'	Report	Pedersen 15'; Jensen 45'; Myklebust 48'	Stadium: Sola stadion Referee: Aleksander Skjold Vermundsen

26 April 2017	Tillerbyen (4)	1–2	(3) Byåsen	Trondheim
18:00 CEST (UTC+2)	Snekvik 41'	Report	Furu 67'; Gunnes 82'	Stadium: TOBB Arena Sør; Attendance: 200; Referee: Erlend Helmersen

26 April 2017	Moss (4)	3–2 (a.e.t.)	(4) Sprint-Jeløy	Moss
18:00 CEST (UTC+2)	Reinback 29'; Stokkebø 65'; Thun 100'	Report	Kaldheim 22'; Isegran 41'	Stadium: Melløs Stadion; Attendance: 647; Referee: Sebastian Vegstein Mikalsen

26 April 2017	Træff (4)	1–2 (a.e.t.)	(2) Ranheim	Molde
18:00 CEST (UTC+2)	Cisic 5'	Report	Riksvold 36'; Gjertsen 120+2'	Stadium: Reknesbanen; Attendance: 100; Referee: Even Myrheim

26 April 2017	Gjøvik-Lyn (4)	0–4	(3) Brumunddal	Gjøvik
18:00 CEST (UTC+2)		Report	Osmo 25', 85'; Ruud 28', 63'	Stadium: Gjovik Stadion; Attendance: 145; Referee: Mohammad Hafezi

26 April 2017	Grorud (3)	4–1	(3) Follo	Oslo
18:00 CEST (UTC+2)	Østland 68', 71'; Mankowitz 77'; Kastrati 89'	Report	Dalseth 90'	Stadium: Grorud matchbane Attendance: 151; Referee: Sulman Maroof Hussain

26 April 2017	Riska (5)	1–4	(1) Viking	Riska
18:00 CEST (UTC+2)	Myhre 64'	Report	Haugen 37'; Michalsen 48'; Pedersen 54'; Shroot 79'	Stadium: Riska stadion Attendance: 1,200; Referee: Steinar Hauge

26 April 2017	HamKam (3)	2–2 (a.e.t.) (4–5 p)	(3) Nybergsund	Hamar
18:00 CEST (UTC+2)	Pedersen 83'; Midtskogen 118'	Report	Saag 37', 94'	Stadium: Briskeby Arena; Attendance: 420; Referee: Eivind Bodding
	Penalties
	Moen (penalty scored); Semou (penalty scored); Rønning (penalty scored); Solbakken (penalty missed); Yabre (penalty scored)		(penalty scored) Del Rio; (penalty scored) Bråtebæk; (penalty scored) Hassan; (penalty scored) Saag; (penalty scored) Nygård

26 April 2017	Flisa (4)	0–6	(2) Elverum	Flisa
18:00 CEST (UTC+2)		Report	Layoni 26' (pen.); Hagen 30'; Círak 44', 71', 85'; Bellhcen 90+3'	Stadium: Flisa Stadium; Attendance: 180; Referee: Shervin Heydary

26 April 2017	Volda (5)	2–3	(1) Molde	Volda
18:00 CEST (UTC+2)	Kvalsnes 60'; Dahlberg 67'	Report	Haaland 46'; Karlsson 52'; S. Svendsen 83'	Stadium: Volda Stadion; Attendance: 2,176; Referee: Mathias Smehus Kringstad

26 April 2017	Staal Jørpeland (4)	0–2	(3) Egersund	Jørpeland
18:00 CEST (UTC+2)		Report	Keita 28'; Romslo 80'	Stadium: Jørpeland stadion Attendance: 300; Referee: Ørjan Vikene

26 April 2017	Holmlia (5)	0–9	(1) Stabæk	Oslo
18:00 CEST (UTC+2)		Report	Mauritz-Hansen 23', 44', 90'; Omoijuanfo 36', 52'; Njie 47'; El Amrani 48', 73'; Nimely 75'	Stadium: Lusetjern kunstgress Attendance: 500; Referee: Bjørn Hansen

26 April 2017	Hei (5)	0–10	(1) Odd	Porsgrunn
18:00 CEST (UTC+2)		Report	Agdestein 10', 27', 61'; Mladenovic 13', 90+2'; Berg 43', 88'; Riski 55', 74'; Haugen 84'	Stadium: Mortens Plass; Attendance: 2,218; Referee: Marius Lien

26 April 2017	Kvik Halden (4)	4–1	(4) Østsiden	Halden
18:00 CEST (UTC+2)	Berglund 6'; Næsheim 20'; Topallaj 43'; Blystad 83'	Report	Lunde 26' (pen.)	Stadium: Halden Stadion; Attendance: 123; Referee: Abdulhadi Al-Fahad

26 April 2017	Harstad (4)	0–1 (a.e.t.)	(4) Sortland	Harstad
18:00 CEST (UTC+2)		Report	Karlsen 113'	Stadium: Harstad stadion Attendance: 70; Referee: Ole Ragnar Jansen Knutsen

26 April 2017	Stord (4)	0–1	(4) Lysekloster	Stord
18:00 CEST (UTC+2)		Report	Birkeland 24'	Stadium: Stord stadion Attendance: 90; Referee: Ruben Haugland

26 April 2017	Bjørnevatn (5)	0–5	(1) Tromsø	Bjørnevatn
18:00 CEST (UTC+2)		Report	Michalsen 24'; Mathisen 47' (o.g.); Ingebrigtsen 61', 83'; Samb 65'	Stadium: Bjørneparken; Attendance: 642; Referee: Anders Karset Gjermshus

26 April 2017	Vestfossen (4)	2–3 (a.e.t.)	(2) Mjøndalen	Vestfossen
18:00 CEST (UTC+2)	Bekkaoui 64'; Arntzen 86'	Report	Johansen 44'; Lindseth 90+4'; Jansen 97'	Stadium: Strandajordet kunstgress Attendance: 500; Referee: Magnus Koløy

26 April 2017	Åssiden (5)	1–3	(1) Strømsgodset	Drammen
18:00 CEST (UTC+2)	Andersen 85'	Report	Engblom 3', 48' (pen.); Agouda 89'	Stadium: Åssiden stadion Attendance: 1,630; Referee: Mohammad Usman Aslam

26 April 2017	Skedsmo (4)	1–4	(2) Ullensaker/Kisa	Skedsmokorset
18:00 CEST (UTC+2)	Rustadbakken 83'	Report	Jørstad 8'; Abshir 45+1'; Langås 65'; Fjeldberg 84'	Stadium: Skedsmo stadion Attendance: 431; Referee: Harald Sletner

26 April 2017	Holmen (4)	2–3 (a.e.t.)	(3) Asker	Asker
18:00 CEST (UTC+2)	Brusnes 70'; Utby 72'	Report	Molde 17'; Mehnert 59', 105+1'	Stadium: Holmen Arena; Attendance: 420; Referee: Emilie Rodahl Dokset

26 April 2017	Brattvåg (4)	0–3	(1) Kristiansund	Brattvåg
18:00 CEST (UTC+2)		Report	Aasbak 47'; Rønningen 80'; Mendy 90+2'	Stadium: Brattvåg gras Attendance: 403; Referee: Mads Skarsem

26 April 2017	Drøbak-Frogn (4)	1–10	(1) Sarpsborg 08	Drøbak
18:00 CEST (UTC+2)	Vågan 62'	Report	Fejzullahu 3', 11', 19'; Diatta 21', 30', 86'; Trondsen 23'; Larsen 45', 78', 90+2'	Stadium: Seiersten stadion Attendance: 420; Referee: Torkel Jonsson Traedal

26 April 2017	Lørenskog (4)	1–5	(2) Strømmen	Lørenskog
18:00 CEST (UTC+2)	Arjona 42'	Report	Ness 5'; Sildnes 38'; Loulanti 54'; Solum 80'; Rasch 85'	Stadium: Rolvsrud stadion Attendance: 279; Referee: Jørgen Haugen

26 April 2017	Donn (5)	0–2	(2) Jerv	Kristiansand
18:00 CEST (UTC+2)		Report	Andersen 5', 16'	Stadium: Kongsgård Arena; Attendance: 280; Referee: Jon Romuld Haaversen

26 April 2017	Randesund (5)	1–5	(2) Start	Kristiansand
18:00 CEST (UTC+2)	Larsen 45'	Report	Vorthoren 22', 24'; Aase 70', 88'; Christensen 81'	Stadium: Sukkevann Kunstgress; Attendance: 1,068; Referee: Haakon Magan

26 April 2017	Flint (5)	1–2	(1) Sandefjord	Tønsberg
18:00 CEST (UTC+2)	Bratteli 37'	Report	Holt 53'; Lorentzen 82'	Stadium: Løveid kunstgress Attendance: 650; Referee: Adrian Gjendemsjø

26 April 2017	Skjetten (4)	0–2	(1) Lillestrøm	Skjetten
18:00 CEST (UTC+2)		Report	Ajeti 27'; Škoda 47'	Stadium: Skjetten Stadion; Attendance: 1,750; Referee: Per Erik Haugen

26 April 2017	Redalen (4)	1–5	(3) Raufoss	Gjøvik
18:00 CEST (UTC+2)	Sveen 47'	Report	Nome 43', 45'; Aganović 59' (71), pen.' Dadjo 69'	Stadium: Vardal idrettspark Attendance: 205; Referee: Johan William Grundt

26 April 2017	Fauske/Sprint (5)	0–7	(2) Bodø/Glimt	Fauske
18:00 CEST (UTC+2)		Report	Saltnes 17'; Opseth 24'; Edvardsen 33'; Osvold 76'; Ángel 78'; Kachi 84'; Mladenović 90+2'	Stadium: Fauske Kunstgress; Attendance: 725; Referee: Ali Al-Hatem

26 April 2017	Fyllingsdalen (4)	2–1	(4) Sotra	Bergen
18:00 CEST (UTC+2)	Kalve 3', 54'	Report	Rugland 72'	Stadium: Varden Amfi; Attendance: 120; Referee: Vebjørn Nord Haugland

26 April 2017	Ørn-Horten (4)	2–0	(3) Hønefoss	Horten
18:00 CEST (UTC+2)	Bransdal 49'; Haakenstad 67'	Report		Stadium: Lystlunden; Attendance: 200; Referee: Harald Magnus Børresen

26 April 2017	Austevoll (5)	0–7	(1) Brann	Storebø
18:00 CEST (UTC+2)		Report	Skålevik 25', 85'; Karadas 33'; Grønner 44'; Stenevik 76'; Bildøy 85' (pen.); Vega 86'	Stadium: Austevoll Kunstgress; Attendance: 1,200; Referee: Jan Morten Tennøy

26 April 2017	Ullern (4)	1–3	(3) KFUM Oslo	Oslo
18:00 CEST (UTC+2)	Obiech 90+2'	Report	Hagen 30' (pen.), 83'; Jensen 55'	Stadium: Ullernbanen; Attendance: 150; Referee: Marius Bye

26 April 2017	Mo (4)	2–3 (a.e.t.)	(4) Mosjøen	Mo i Rana
18:00 CEST (UTC+2)	Teigen 32'; Råde 99'	Report	Kapskarmo 26'; Høgseth 106'; Ellingsen 119'	Stadium: Nye Sagbakken Stadion; Attendance: 400; Referee: Frank Salbu Brandt Henneman

26 April 2017	Bryne (3)	4–0	(4) Brodd	Bryne
18:00 CEST (UTC+2)	Langeland 55'; Lye 61'; Høyland 75'; Khalili 85'	Report		Stadium: Bryne Stadion; Attendance: 380; Referee: Kjetil Nordmark

26 April 2017	Alta (3)	5–1	(4) Senja	Alta
18:00 CEST (UTC+2)	Thioune 13'; Jacobsen 28'; Nicolaisen 39'; Markussen 47'; Overvik 90'	Report	Jensen 31'	Stadium: Finnmarkshallen; Attendance: 322; Referee: Tore Olsen Hagelund

26 April 2017	Fjøra (4)	1–6	(1) Sogndal	Sogndalsfjøra
18:00 CEST (UTC+2)	Flo 61'	Report	Nwakali 7'; Koomson 27'; Bye 43'; Brekkhus 69'; Kjemhus 71', 85'	Stadium: Fosshaugane Campus; Attendance: 340; Referee: Marius Hansen Grøtta

26 April 2017	Mjølner (4)	2–3 (a.e.t.)	(3) Finnsnes	Narvik
18:30 CEST (UTC+2)	Juchno 52'; Andersen 104'	Report	Simonsen 77', 112', 119'	Stadium: Narvik Stadion; Attendance: 150; Referee: Simen Albrigtsen Eilertsen

26 April 2017	Herd (4)	3–5 (a.e.t.)	(1) Aalesund	Ålesund
18:30 CEST (UTC+2)	C.Rekdal 9'; Mathiesen 43'; Kristjansson 112' (pen.)	Report	Abdellaoue 56', 101'; Fet 65'; Mäntylä 93'; Veldwijk 120'	Stadium: Amfi Moa Stadion; Attendance: 1,100; Referee: Thomas Solum Lystad

26 April 2017	Hødd (3)	4–1	(4) Spjelkavik	Ulsteinvik
19:00 CEST (UTC+2)	Torset 1'; Mbedule 49', 58'; Kallevåg 90+2'	Report	Sunde 37'	Stadium: Nye Høddvoll; Attendance: 350; Referee: Torgeir Halsen

26 April 2017	Kolstad (4)	3–4	(4) Verdal	Kolstad
19:00 CEST (UTC+2)	Homstad 10'; Valø 25'; Weatherston 49'	Report	Engesvik 34'; Weatherston 41' (o.g.); Nordvoll 45'; Krysian 78'	Stadium: Huseby idrettspark Attendance: 100; Referee: Stian Wiggen Hansen

26 April 2017	Gran (5)	0–8	(1) Vålerenga	Gran
19:15 CEST (UTC+2)		Report	Ibrahim 17', 43', 64'; Finne 19'; Zahid 30', 67' (pen.); Grødem 61'; Ejuke 90+1'	Stadium: Sparebank1banen; Attendance: 3,112; Referee: Sigurd Kringstad

26 April 2017	Fløya (4)	4–3	(4) Salangen	Tromsø
19:30 CEST (UTC+2)	Vangdal 37'; Johansen 64'; Meyer 75'; Mathisen 86'	Report	4' (o.g.); Fitzgerald 29'; Henriksen 43'	Stadium: Fløyabanen; Attendance: 100; Referee: Egil Bertheussen

27 April 2017	Vidar (3)	0–3	(1) Haugesund	Stavanger
18:00 CEST (UTC+2)		Report	Andreassen 39'; Gytkjær 70'; Buduson 90+4'	Stadium: Lassa Idrettspark; Attendance: 300; Referee: Daniel Higraff

27 April 2017	Skeid (3)	2–1	(4) Lyn	Oslo
18:00 CEST (UTC+2)	Tavakoli 15', 75' (pen.)	Report	Pellegrino 72'	Stadium: Nordre Åsen; Attendance: 853; Referee: Christian Moen

27 April 2017	Stjørdals-Blink (4)	2–0	(3) Nardo	Stjørdalshalsen
18:00 CEST (UTC+2)	Šišić 35', 69'	Report		Stadium: Nye Blinkbanen; Attendance: 207; Referee: Mathias Støfringshaug

27 April 2017	Pors Grenland (4)	2–0	(3) Fram Larvik	Porsgrunn
18:00 CEST (UTC+2)	Bentsen 11'; Larsen 52'	Report		Stadium: Pors Stadion; Attendance: 180; Referee: Nedim Brbovic

27 April 2017	Førde (4)	0–2	(2) Florø	Førde
18:00 CEST (UTC+2)		Report	Muhammed 82', 89'	Stadium: Førde stadion Attendance: 637; Referee: Andre Holtar Arnholt

27 April 2017	Bærum (3)	1–0	(4) Oppsal	Sandvika
18:00 CEST (UTC+2)	Dizdar 71'	Report		Stadium: Sandvika Stadion; Attendance: 50; Referee: Magnus Muri Nygren

== Second round ==
Number of teams per tier entering this round
Eliteserien (1)	1. divisjon (2)	2. divisjon (3)	3. divisjon (4)	4. divisjon (5)	Total
16 / 16	15 / 16	19 / 28	14 / 84	0 / 295	64 / 439

24 May 2017	Fløy (4)	4–3	(2) Start	Kristiansand
18:00 CEST (UTC+2)	Tveit 2', 62'; Dahlum 51'; Skagestad 60'	Report	Antwi 36', 84'; Vorthoren 87'	Stadium: Flekkerøy stadion Attendance: 1,250; Referee: Marius Lien

24 May 2017	Jerv (2)	2–1	(3) Bryne	Grimstad
18:00 CEST (UTC+2)	Berglann 18'; Undheim 39'	Report	Khalili 45'	Stadium: J.J. Ugland Stadion; Attendance: 783; Referee: Haakon Magan

24 May 2017	Byåsen (3)	0–2	(1) Aalesund	Trondheim
18:00 CEST (UTC+2)		Report	Berisha 36'; Veldwijk 86'	Stadium: Byåsen Arena; Attendance: 215; Referee: Kent Ove Gomo Hammer

24 May 2017	Ranheim (2)	3–1	(4) Stjørdals-Blink	Trondheim
18:00 CEST (UTC+2)	Riksvold 15'; Tromsdal 54'; Karlsen 65'	Report	Stokke 47'	Stadium: Ranheim Arena; Attendance: 270; Referee: Thomas Solum Lystad

24 May 2017	Hødd (3)	1–2	(1) Molde	Ulsteinvik
18:00 CEST (UTC+2)	Rise 68'	Report	Amang 81'; Hussain 90+2'	Stadium: Høddvoll Stadion; Attendance: 1,083; Referee: Marius Hansen Grøtta

24 May 2017	Mosjøen (4)	0–5	(2) Levanger	Mosjøen
18:00 CEST (UTC+2)		Report	Aas 13'; Strand 35', 70'; Udoh 56'; Lopez 90'	Stadium: Kippermoen; Attendance: 380; Referee: Ali Al-Hatem

24 May 2017	Sortland (4)	1–3	(2) Bodø/Glimt	Sortland
18:00 CEST (UTC+2)	Ellingsen 61'	Report	Saltnes 22'; Osvold 74'; Kachi 87'	Stadium: Blåbyhallen; Attendance: 1,400; Referee: Henrik Andreas Grenå Pettersen

24 May 2017	Verdal (4)	0–4	(1) Kristiansund	Verdalsøra
18:00 CEST (UTC+2)		Report	Lekaj 4'; Stokke 68'; Rønningen 75'; Hopmark 87'	Stadium: Verdal stadion Attendance: 225; Referee: Kim Rune Borgersen

24 May 2017	Vard Haugesund (3)	0–6	(1) Haugesund	Haugesund
18:00 CEST (UTC+2)		Report	Ibrahim 11', 16'; Kiss 24'; Huseklepp 80', 90+1'; Buduson 87'	Stadium: Haugesund Stadion; Attendance: 880; Referee: Steinar Hauge

24 May 2017	Lysekloster (4)	0–2	(1) Brann	Lyse Abbey
18:00 CEST (UTC+2)		Report	Børven 25'; Nilsen 52'	Stadium: Lysekloster Framo Idrettspark; Attendance: 1,495; Referee: Sivert Amland

24 May 2017	Åsane (2)	1–0	(4) Fyllingsdalen	Åsane
18:00 CEST (UTC+2)	Soltvedt 39'	Report		Stadium: Åsane Idrettspark; Attendance: 360; Referee: Ola Kellerhals

24 May 2017	Nest-Sotra (3)	2–0	(2) Sandnes Ulf	Ågotnes
18:00 CEST (UTC+2)	Dang 14'; Furdal 90+2'	Report		Stadium: Ågotnes Stadion; Attendance: 262; Referee: André Knudsen Arnholt

24 May 2017	Florø (2)	5–1	(3) Fana	Florø
18:00 CEST (UTC+2)	Benmoussa 6', 67'; Muhammed 37'; Rotihaug 39'; Hollevik 70'	Report	Matos 82'	Stadium: Florø Stadion; Attendance: 654; Referee: Mathias Smehus Kringstadbukta

24 May 2017	Fløya (4)	5–3 (a.e.t.)	(2) Tromsdalen	Tromsø
18:00 CEST (UTC+2)	Johansen 17'; Olsen 73'; Meyer 90+2'; Skaue 99'; Mathisen 103'	Report	Johnsgård 33'; Mienna 36'; Abelsen 83'	Stadium: Fløyabanen; Attendance: 221; Referee: Eivind Bodding

24 May 2017	Finnsnes (3)	0–2	(1) Tromsø	Finnsnes
18:00 CEST (UTC+2)		Report	Sigurðarson 29'; Gundersen 57'	Stadium: Finnsnes Stadion; Attendance: 534; Referee: Harald Sletner

24 May 2017	Ullensaker/Kisa (2)	2–0	(3) Alta	Jessheim
18:00 CEST (UTC+2)	Sandberg 76', 82'	Report		Stadium: UKI Arena; Attendance: 245; Referee: Shervin Heydary

24 May 2017	Brumunddal (3)	1–3	(1) Lillestrøm	Brumunddal
18:00 CEST (UTC+2)	Eriksen 2'	Report	Ajeti 25'; Melgalvis 52'; Škoda 83'	Stadium: Sveum Idrettspark; Attendance: 1,212; Referee: Ajdin Medic

24 May 2017	Raufoss (3)	0–2	(1) Sogndal	Raufoss
18:00 CEST (UTC+2)		Report	Lund 79'; Bye 81'	Stadium: NAMMO Stadion; Attendance: 792; Referee: Bjørn Hansen

24 May 2017	Strømmen (2)	0–1	(3) Kjelsås	Strømmen
18:00 CEST (UTC+2)		Report	Aslaksrud 69'	Stadium: Strømmen Stadion; Attendance: 119; Referee: Ole-Alexander Ekeli Valen

24 May 2017	Kråkerøy (4)	2–2 (a.e.t.) (2–3 p)	(1) Vålerenga	Kråkerøy
18:00 CEST (UTC+2)	Alphonso 46'; Thorsen 74'	Report	Johansen 28'; Zahid 31'	Stadium: Kråkerøy Stadium; Attendance: 2,162; Referee: Rohit Saggi
	Penalties
	Laabak (penalty scored); Nilsen (penalty missed); Knudsen (penalty scored); Magnussen (penalty missed); Syversen (penalty missed)		(penalty missed) Stengel; (penalty scored) Johansen; (penalty missed) Tollås; (penalty scored) Zahid; (penalty scored) Jääger

24 May 2017	Moss (4)	1–3	(1) Sarpsborg 08	Moss
18:00 CEST (UTC+2)	Reinback 35'	Report	Heintz 28'; Mortensen 67'; Fejzullahu 90+3'	Stadium: Melløs Stadion; Attendance: 1,212; Referee: Christian Moen

24 May 2017	Grorud (3)	0–1	(2) Elverum	Oslo
18:00 CEST (UTC+2)		Report	Bellhcen 24'	Stadium: Grorud matchbane Attendance: 218; Referee: Sebastian Mikalsen

24 May 2017	Skeid (3)	2–4 (a.e.t.)	(1) Strømsgodset	Oslo
18:00 CEST (UTC+2)	Yousef 10'; Tavakoli 45+1'	Report	Hamoud 32'; Jradi 87', 95'; Engblom 91'	Stadium: Nordre Åsen; Attendance: 766; Referee: Per Erik Haugen

24 May 2017	Ørn-Horten (4)	3–1	(1) Sandefjord	Horten
18:00 CEST (UTC+2)	Bransdal 54', 56'; Brovina 87'	Report	Kovács 86' (pen.)	Stadium: Lystlunden; Attendance: 500; Referee: Mohammad Usman Aslam

24 May 2017	Pors Grenland (4)	1–3	(1) Odd	Porsgrunn
18:00 CEST (UTC+2)	Lauritsen 45'	Report	Riski 23'; Jensen 50'; Berg 89'	Stadium: Pors Stadion; Attendance: 3,114; Referee: Adrian Gjendemsjø

24 May 2017	Mjøndalen (2)	3–1 (a.e.t.)	(4) Kvik Halden	Mjøndalen
18:10 CEST (UTC+2)	Pellegrino 38'; Lindseth 52'; Boye 88'	Report	Berbatovci 68'	Stadium: Isachsen Stadion; Attendance: 450; Referee: Sulman Hussain

24 May 2017	KFUM Oslo (3)	4–0	(3) Bærum	Oslo
18:25 CEST (UTC+2)	Ekblom 5'; Sortevik 60', 88'; Hagen 73' (pen.)	Report		Stadium: KFUM Arena; Attendance: 128; Referee: Jørgen Haugen

24 May 2017	Tynset (4)	1–9	(1) Rosenborg	Tynset
18:30 CEST (UTC+2)	Ligård 79'	Report	Jevtović 16'; Meling 36'; Vilhjálmsson 47', 90+2'; Reginiussen 52'; Konradsen 57'; Jensen 72'; Midtsjø 75'; Rashani 90+3'	Stadium: Nytrømoen; Attendance: 3,026; Referee: Mads Skarsem

25 May 2017	Egersund (3)	3–1	(1) Viking	Egersund
18:00 CEST (UTC+2)	Sumareh 18'; Sleveland 62'; Larsen 90+2'	Report	Bringaker 50'	Stadium: Idrettsparken; Attendance: 1,357; Referee: Jan Morten Tennøy

25 May 2017	Arendal (2)	1–2	(3) Notodden	Arendal
18:00 CEST (UTC+2)	Marković 78'	Report	Hustad 54'; Hoseth 87'	Stadium: Bjønnes Stadion; Attendance: 466; Referee: Magnus Koløy

25 May 2017	Nybergsund (3)	0–1	(2) Kongsvinger	Nybergsund
18:00 CEST (UTC+2)		Report	Ericsson 74'	Stadium: Nybergsund Stadion; Attendance: 416; Referee: Tore Olsen Hagelund

25 May 2017	Asker (3)	0–5	(1) Stabæk	Asker
18:00 CEST (UTC+2)		Report	Mauritz-Hansen 49', 72', 73'; Kassi 54'; Nimely 90'	Stadium: Føyka Stadion; Attendance: 1,440; Referee: Torkel Jonsson Traedal

== Third round ==
Number of teams per tier entering this round
Eliteserien (1)	1. divisjon (2)	2. divisjon (3)	3. divisjon (4)	4. divisjon (5)	Total
14 / 16	10 / 16	5 / 28	3 / 84	0 / 295	32 / 439

31 May 2017	Bodø/Glimt (2)	2–2 (a.e.t.) (6–7 p)	(2) Elverum	Bodø
18:00 CEST (UTC+2)	Osvold 90'; Saltnes 75'	Report	Layouni 75'; Moggia 75'	Stadium: Aspmyra Stadion; Attendance: 614; Referee: Marius Hansen Grøtta
	Penalties
	Ángel (penalty scored); Moberg (penalty scored); Bjørnbak (penalty scored); Saltnes (penalty scored); Opseth (penalty scored); Osvold (penalty scored); Jacobsen (penalty missed)		(penalty scored) Hjelmseth; (penalty scored) Sulaka; (penalty scored) Cukovic; (penalty scored) Moggia; (penalty scored) Rønes; (penalty scored) Cirak; (penalty scored) Simenstad

31 May 2017	Notodden (3)	1–4 (a.e.t.)	(1) Stabæk	Notodden
18:30 CEST (UTC+2)	Hustad 25'	Report	Njie 27'; Ba 107'; Nimely 112'; Kassi 116'	Stadium: Notodden Stadion; Attendance: 986; Referee: Per Erik Haugen

31 May 2017	Kjelsås (3)	0–1	(1) Aalesund	Oslo
18:30 CEST (UTC+2)		Report	Marlinho 11'	Stadium: Grefsen Stadion; Attendance: 865; Referee: Sivert Amland

31 May 2017	Fløya (4)	1–3	(1) Tromsø	Tromsø
18:30 CEST (UTC+2)	C.Olsen 90+2'	Report	T.Olsen 45'; Pedersen 59'; Ingebrigtsen 65'	Stadium: Fløya Arena; Attendance: 882; Referee: Mads Skarsem

31 May 2017	Ranheim (2)	0–2	(1) Kristiansund	Trondheim
18:30 CEST (UTC+2)		Report	Mendy 49'; Bamba 52'	Stadium: Extra Arena; Attendance: 333; Referee: Torkel Jonsson Traedal

31 May 2017	Florø (2)	2–1	(1) Sogndal	Florø
18:30 CEST (UTC+2)	Muhammed 61'; Benmoussa 67'	Report	Husa 60' (o.g.)	Stadium: Florø Stadion; Attendance: 1,209; Referee: Jan Morten Tennøy

31 May 2017	Egersund (3)	1–2 (a.e.t.)	(1) Haugesund	Egersund
18:30 CEST (UTC+2)	Larsen 118'	Report	Wawrzynkiewicz 103' (o.g.); Ibrahim 108'	Stadium: Idrettsparken; Attendance: 1,024; Referee: Tore Hansen

31 May 2017	Ull/Kisa (2)	2–4	(1) Lillestrøm	Jessheim
18:30 CEST (UTC+2)	Sandberg 18'; Fjeldberg 82'	Report	Innocent 27'; Rafn 30'; Mikalsen 67'; Kippe 87'	Stadium: Jessheim Stadion; Attendance: 1,871; Referee: Trygve Kjensli

31 May 2017	Levanger (2)	2–4	(1) Rosenborg	Levanger
18:30 CEST (UTC+2)	Taddese 66'; Stene 89'	Report	Helland 36' (pen.); Vilhjálmsson 42', 67', 70'	Stadium: Moan Fritidspark; Attendance: 2,078; Referee: Sigurd Smehus Kringstad

31 May 2017	Nest-Sotra (3)	0–2	(1) Brann	Ågotnes
18:30 CEST (UTC+2)		Report	Orlov 66', 71'	Stadium: Ågotnes Stadion; Attendance: 1,515; Referee: Trond Ivar Døvle

31 May 2017	Ørn-Horten (4)	0–1 (a.e.t.)	(1) Vålerenga	Horten
18:30 CEST (UTC+2)		Report	Stengel 100'	Stadium: Lystlunden; Attendance: 2,241; Referee: Christian Moen

31 May 2017	Kongsvinger (2)	0–4	(1) Sarpsborg 08	Kongsvinger
18:30 CEST (UTC+2)		Report	Mortensen 14'; Nielsen 43'; Halvorsen 63'; Zachariassen 66'	Stadium: Gjemselund Stadion; Attendance: 1,003; Referee: Bjørn Hansen

31 May 2017	Fløy (4)	0–3	(1) Odd	Flekkerøy
19:15 CEST (UTC+2)		Report	Berg 21', 50'; Mladenovic 64'	Stadium: Flekkerøy Stadion; Attendance: 1,852; Referee: Steinar Hauge

1 June 2017	KFUM (3)	1–2	(1) Molde	Oslo
18:00 CEST (UTC+2)	Sortevik 39'	Report	Brustad 58', 61'	Stadium: KFUM Arena; Attendance: 1,357; Referee: Anders Gjermshus

1 June 2017	Mjøndalen (2)	2–1	(1) Strømsgodset	Mjøndalen
19:00 CEST (UTC+2)	Boye 59'; Pellegrino 66'	Report	Pedersen 44'	Stadium: Isachsen Stadion; Attendance: 4,200; Referee: Tom Harald Hagen

21 June 2017	Jerv (2)	2–1	(2) Åsane	Grimstad
19:00 CEST (UTC+2)	Akintola 45'; Ertzeid Toft 90+4'	Report	Vatle Hammersland 56'	Stadium: Levermyr Stadion; Attendance: 1,077; Referee: Mohammad Usman Aslam

== Fourth round ==
Number of teams per tier entering this round
Eliteserien (1)	1. divisjon (2)	2. divisjon (3)	3. divisjon (4)	4. divisjon (5)	Total
12 / 16	4 / 16	0 / 28	0 / 84	0 / 295	16 / 439

9 August 2017	Haugesund (1)	0–2	(1) Molde	Haugesund
18:30 CEST (UTC+2)		Report	Brustad 3'; Sigurðarson 66'	Stadium: Haugesund Stadion; Attendance: 2,688; Referee: Rohit Saggi

9 August 2017	Kristiansund (1)	1–0	(2) Florø	Kristiansund
18:30 CEST (UTC+2)	Kalludra 52'	Report		Stadium: Atlanten Stadion; Attendance: 2,613; Referee: Sigurd Smehus Kringstad

9 August 2017	Lillestrøm (1)	1–0	(1) Tromsø	Lillestrøm
18:30 CEST (UTC+2)	Tagbajumi 57'	Report		Stadium: Åråsen Stadion; Attendance: 2,125; Referee: Tore Hansen

9 August 2017	Jerv (2)	1–2	(1) Rosenborg	Grimstad
18:30 CEST (UTC+2)	Haugstad 11'	Report	Jevtović 33'; Vilhjálmsson 60'	Stadium: J.J. Ugland Stadion; Attendance: 2,989; Referee: Tom Harald Hagen

9 August 2017	Sarpsborg 08 (1)	4–0	(1) Odd	Sarpsborg
18:30 CEST (UTC+2)	Rossbach 38' (o.g.), 41' (o.g.); Diatta 47'; Trondsen 52'	Report		Stadium: Sarpsborg Stadion; Attendance: 2,650; Referee: Espen Eskås

9 August 2017	Mjøndalen (2)	1–0	(1) Brann	Mjøndalen
19:45 CEST (UTC+2)	Gauseth 35'	Report		Stadium: Isachsen Stadion; Attendance: 2,499; Referee: Ola Hobber Nilsen

10 August 2017	Stabæk (1)	3–0	(1) Aalesund	Bærum
18:00 CEST (UTC+2)	Gyasi 20'; Lumanza 41'; Brochmann 47'	Report		Stadium: Nadderud Stadion; Attendance: 1,820; Referee: Trond Ivar Døvle

10 August 2017	Vålerenga (1)	1–0	(2) Elverum	Oslo
18:30 CEST (UTC+2)	Jääger 22'	Report		Stadium: Ullevaal Stadion; Attendance: 2,284; Referee: Kristoffer Hagenes

== Quarter-finals ==
Number of teams per tier entering this round
Eliteserien (1)	1. divisjon (2)	2. divisjon (3)	3. divisjon (4)	4. divisjon (5)	Total
7 / 16	1 / 16	0 / 28	0 / 84	0 / 295	8 / 439

26 August 2017	Mjøndalen (2)	1–2	(1) Sarpsborg 08	Mjøndalen
16:00 CEST (UTC+2)	Jansen 33'	Report	Zachariassen 66'; Heintz 85'	Stadium: Isachsen Stadion; Attendance: 2,244; Referee: Espen Eskås

26 August 2017	Lillestrøm (1)	3–1	(1) Stabæk	Lillestrøm
18:30 CEST (UTC+2)	Melgalvis 21'; Tagbajumi 56'; Krogstad 90+2'	Report	Sæter 29'	Stadium: Åråsen Stadion; Attendance: 2,937; Referee: Kai Steen

27 August 2017	Molde (1)	2–1	(1) Kristiansund	Molde
17:45 CEST (UTC+2)	Haaland 75'; Ellingsen 78'	Report	Stokke 8'	Stadium: Aker Stadion; Attendance: 7,755; Referee: Ola Hobber Nilsen

27 August 2017	Rosenborg (1)	1–2	(1) Vålerenga	Trondheim
20:15 CEST (UTC+2)	Jevtović 12'	Report	Dønnum 43'; Johansen 74'	Stadium: Lerkendal Stadion; Attendance: 9,195; Referee: Tom Harald Hagen

== Semi-finals ==
Number of teams per tier entering this round
Eliteserien (1)	1. divisjon (2)	2. divisjon (3)	3. divisjon (4)	4. divisjon (5)	Total
4 / 16	0 / 16	0 / 28	0 / 84	0 / 295	4 / 439

20 September 2017	Vålerenga (1)	0–3	(1) Sarpsborg 08	Oslo
20:15 CEST (UTC+2)		Report	Diatta 25'; Halvorsen 59', 90' (pen.)	Stadium: Valle Hovin; Attendance: 8,302; Referee: Tore Hansen

21 September 2017	Molde (1)	0–3	(1) Lillestrøm	Molde
19:00 CEST (UTC+2)		Report	Mikalsen 75'; Knudtzon 87'; Melgalvis 90+1'	Stadium: Aker Stadion; Attendance: 6,482; Referee: Svein Oddvar Moen

== Final ==
3 December 2017
13:15 CET (UTC+1)

Lillestrøm	3–2	Sarpsborg 08
Mikalsen 2'; Haakenstad 12'; Kippe 59'	Report	Mortensen 24'; Kippe 64' (o.g.)

Ullevaal Stadion, Oslo
Attendance: 25,091
Referee: Ola Hobber Nilsen (Nordstrand)

== Scorers ==
As of match played 3 December 2017

8 goals:

- (Iceland) Matthías Vilhjálmsson - Rosenborg

6 goals:

- (Norway) Sindre Mauritz-Hansen - Stabæk

5 goals:

- (Norway) Oliver Berg - Odd
- (Senegal) Krépin Diatta - Sarpsborg 08

4 goals:

- (France) Rashad Muhammed - Florø
- (Sweden) Erton Fejzullahu - Sarpsborg 08

3 goals:

- (Norway) Joachim Osvold - Bodø/Glimt
- (Norway) Ulrik Saltnes - Bodø/Glimt
- (Sweden) Adnan Círak - Elverum
- (Norway) Jonas Simonsen - Finnsnes
- (Norway) Christian Tveit - Flekkerøy
- (Norway) Monir Benmoussa - Florø
- (Nigeria) Shuaibu Ibrahim - Haugesund
- (Norway) Kristoffer Hagen - KFUM Oslo
- (Norway) Stian Sortevik - KFUM Oslo
- (Norway) Niklas Castro - Kongsvinger
- (Norway) Andreas Lykke Strand - Levanger
- (Norway) Aleksander Melgalvis Andreassen - Lillestrøm
- (Norway) Simen Kind Mikalsen - Lillestrøm
- (Norway) Fredrik Brustad - Molde
- (Finland) Riku Riski - Odd
- (Norway) Torbjørn Agdestein - Odd
- (Norway) Stefan Mladenovic - Odd
- (Norway) Lasse Bransdal - Ørn-Horten
- (Serbia) Milan Jevtović - Rosenborg
- (Norway) Ole Jørgen Halvorsen - Sarpsborg 08
- (Norway) Tobias Heintz - Sarpsborg 08
- (Norway) Jørgen Strand Larsen - Sarpsborg 08
- (Denmark) Patrick Mortensen - Sarpsborg 08
- (Norway) David Tavakoli - Skeid
- (England) Alex Nimely - Stabæk
- (Netherlands) Niels Vorthoren - Start
- (Sweden) Pontus Engblom - Strømsgodset
- (Norway) Tor Martin Mienna - Tromsdalen
- (Norway) Mikael Ingebrigtsen - Tromsø
- (Norway) Niklas Sandberg - Ullensaker/Kisa
- (Norway) Abdisalam Ibrahim - Vålerenga
- (Norway) Ghayas Zahid - Vålerenga

2 goals:

- (Norway) Mustafa Abdellaoue - Aalesund
- (South Africa) Lars Veldwijk - Aalesund
- (Norway) Ylldren Ibrahimaj - Arendal
- (Norway) Marcus Mehnert - Asker
- (Nigeria) Kachi - Bodø/Glimt
- (Norway) Steffen Lie Skålevik - Brann
- (Sweden) Jakob Orlov - Brann
- (Norway) Torgeir Strand Osmo - Brumunddal
- (Norway) Vegard Ruud - Brumunddal
- (Norway) Aram Khalili - Bryne
- (Norway) Sverre Larsen - Egersund
- (Norway) Ellmahdi Bellhcen - Elverum
- (Sweden) Amor Layouni - Elverum
- (Norway) Yngvar Johansen - Fløya
- (Norway) Morten Mathias Larssen Mathisen - Fløya
- (Norway) Geirald Meyer - Fløya
- (Norway) Christopher Tian Olsen - Fløya
- (Norway) Kjetil Kalve - Fyllingsdalen
- (Norway) Martin Østland - Grorud
- (Norway) Erik Huseklepp - Haugesund
- (Norway) Johnny Per Buduson - Haugesund
- (Norway) Amani Mbedule - Hødd
- (Norway) Martin Hoel Andersen - Jerv
- (Norway) Jens Aslaksrud - Kjelsås
- (Norway) Jonas Rønningen - Kristiansund
- (Norway) Benjamin Stokke - Kristiansund
- (Senegal) Jean Alassane Mendy - Kristiansund
- (Nigeria) Aniekpeno Udoh - Levanger
- (Norway) Jo Sondre Aas - Levanger
- (Czech Republic) Michal Škoda - Lillestrøm
- (Nigeria) Marco Tagbajumi - Lillestrøm
- (Norway) Frode Kippe - Lillestrøm
- (Netherlands) Quint Jansen - Mjøndalen
- (Norway) Jonathan Lindseth - Mjøndalen
- (Norway) Amahl Pellegrino - Mjøndalen
- (Senegal) Ousseynou Boye - Mjøndalen
- (Norway) Erling Haaland - Molde
- (Norway) Tim Andre Reinback - Moss
- (Norway) Alexander Dang - Nest-Sotra
- (Norway) Erlend Hustad - Notodden
- (Norway) Erik Midtgarden - Notodden
- (Estonia) Kaimar Saag - Nybergsund
- (Norway) Kim Ove Riksvold - Ranheim
- (Norway) Håvard Nome - Raufoss
- (Sweden) Armin Aganović - Raufoss
- (Norway) Anders Trondsen - Sarpsborg 08
- (Norway) Kristoffer Zachariassen - Sarpsborg 08
- (Norway) Bendik Bye - Sogndal
- (Norway) Lars Christian Kjemhus - Sogndal
- (Ivory Coast) Luc Kassi - Stabæk
- (Norway) Ahmed El Amrani - Stabæk
- (Norway) Moussa Njie - Stabæk
- (Norway) Ohi Omoijuanfo - Stabæk
- (Ghana) Denny Antwi - Start
- (Norway) Daniel Aase - Start
- (Bosnia and Herzegovina) Nedzad Šišić - Stjørdals-Blink
- (Lebanon) Bassel Jradi - Strømsgodset
- (Norway) Fredrik Andresen - Tynset
- (Norway) Jørn Ligård - Tynset
- (Norway) Henrik Kjelsrud Johansen - Vålerenga

1 goals:

- (Sweden) Valmir Berisha - Aalesund
- (Norway) Sondre Brunstad Fet - Aalesund
- (Finland) Tero Mäntylä - Aalesund
- (Brazil) Marlinho - Aalesund
- (Norway) Felix Adrian Jacobsen - Alta
- (Norway) Andreas Markussen - Alta
- (Norway) Mathias Nicolaisen - Alta
- (Norway) Runar Overvik - Alta
- (Senegal) Makhtar Thioune - Alta
- (Norway) Tasso Thomas Dwe - Arendal
- (Norway) Adi Marković - Arendal
- (Norway) Fabian Ness - Arendal
- (Norway) Wilhelm Pepa - Arendal
- (Norway) Jon Arne Hætta Aslaksen - Åsane
- (Norway) Senai Hagos - Åsane
- (Norway) Joakim Vatle Hammersland - Åsane
- (Russia) Vadim Manzon - Åsane
- (Norway) Joachim Soltvedt - Åsane
- (Norway) Mads Songve - Åsane
- (Norway) Stian Stray Molde - Asker
- (Norway) Andreas Mortensen Andersen - Åssiden
- (Norway) Ismar Dizdar - Bærum
- (Spain) José Ángel - Bodø/Glimt
- (Norway) Daniel Edvardsen - Bodø/Glimt
- (Serbia) Nemanja Mladenović - Bodø/Glimt
- (Norway) Kristian Fardal Opseth - Bodø/Glimt
- (Norway) Marius Bildøy - Brann
- (Norway) Torgeir Børven - Brann
- (Norway) Jonas Grønner - Brann
- (Norway) Azar Karadas - Brann
- (Norway) Sivert Heltne Nilsen - Brann
- (Norway) Halldor Stenevik - Brann
- (Costa Rica) Deyver Vega - Brann
- (Norway) Kristian Eriksen - Brumunddal
- (Norway) Geir Dahle Høyland - Bryne
- (Norway) Bjarne Langeland - Bryne
- (Norway) Einar Tunheim Lye - Bryne
- (Norway) Ivar Furu - Byåsen
- (Norway) Arne Gunnes - Byåsen
- (Norway) Mats Vågan - Drøbak-Frogn
- (Sweden) Carlos Gaete - Elverum
- (Norway) Marius Hagen - Elverum
- (Norway) Saibaa Maudo Keita - Egersund
- (Norway) Henning Romslo - Egersund
- (Norway) Chris Sleveland - Egersund
- (The Gambia) Bubacarr Sumareh - Egersund
- (Norway) Andre Matos - Fana
- (Norway) Mathias Flo - Fjøra
- (Norway) Henrik Andersen - Flekkerøy
- (Norway) Henrik Dahlum - Flekkerøy
- (Norway) Erlend Skagestad - Flekkerøy
- (Norway) Haakon Bratteli - Flint
- (Norway) Martin Hollevik - Florø
- (Norway) Oliver Rotihaug - Florø
- (Norway) Nikolai Skaue - Fløya
- (Norway) Erlend Vangdal - Fløya
- (Norway) Håvard Dalseth - Follo
- (Norway) Fisnik Kastrati - Grorud
- (Norway) Preben Mankowitz - Grorud
- (Norway) Christer Johansen Smith - Halsen
- (Norway) Ole Erik Midtskogen - HamKam
- (Norway) Victor Wagner Pedersen - HamKam
- (Norway) Tor Arne Andreassen - Haugesund
- (Denmark) Frederik Gytkjær - Haugesund
- (Slovakia) Filip Kiss - Haugesund
- (Iceland) Ingolfur Örn Kristjansson - Herd
- (Norway) Bendik Bigseth Mathiesen - Herd
- (Norway) Christoffer Brown Rekdal - Herd
- (Norway) Torbjørn Kallevåg - Hødd
- (Norway) Bendik Rise - Hødd
- (Norway) Bendik Torset - Hødd
- (Norway) Christoffer Brusnes - Holmen
- (Norway) Henrik Utby - Holmen
- (Nigeria) David Akintola - Jerv
- (Norway) Ulrik Berglann - Jerv
- (Norway) Eirik Haugstad - Jerv
- (Norway) Jakob Ertzeid Toft - Jerv
- (Norway) Robert Undheim - Jerv
- (Norway) Emil Ekblom - KFUM Oslo
- (Norway) Kenneth Di Vita Jensen - KFUM Oslo
- (Norway) Jens Bonde Aslaksrud - Kjelsås
- (Norway) Martin Fasting - Kjelsås
- (Norway) Glenn Haberg - Kjelsås
- (Norway) Lars Petter Homstad - Kolstad
- (Norway) Morten Valø - Kolstad
- (Scotland) David Weatherston - Kolstad
- (Sweden) Pär Ericsson - Kongsvinger
- (Norway) Martin Tangen Vinjor - Kongsvinger
- (Norway) Oliver Alphonso - Kråkerøy
- (Norway) Martin Stafseng - Kråkerøy
- (Norway) Sivert Nikolai Thorsen - Kråkerøy
- (Norway) Christoffer Aasbak - Kristiansund
- (Ivory Coast) Daouda Bamba - Kristiansund
- (Norway) Andreas Hopmark - Kristiansund
- (Sweden) Liridon Kalludra - Kristiansund
- (Norway) Rocky Lekaj - Kristiansund
- (Norway) Ardijon Berbatovci - Kvik Halden
- (Norway) Björn Berglund - Kvik Halden
- (Norway) Herman Blystad - Kvik Halden
- (Norway) Øystein Lundblad Næsheim - Kvik Halden
- (Norway) Rinor Topallaj - Kvik Halden
- (Spain) Adrià Mateo López - Levanger
- (Norway) Robert Stene - Levanger
- (Norway) Horenus Taddese - Levanger
- (Kosovo) Bajram Ajeti - Lillestrøm
- (Norway) Mats Haakenstad - Lillestrøm
- (Nigeria) Bonke Innocent - Lillestrøm
- (Norway) Erling Knudtzon - Lillestrøm
- (Norway) Fredrik Krogstad - Lillestrøm
- (Norway) Simen Rafn - Lillestrøm
- (Norway) Alvaro Torres Arjona - Lørenskog
- (Norway) Sander Bjørnå - Lura
- (Norway) Anwar Pellegrino - Lyn
- (Norway) Espen Birkeland - Lysekloster
- (Norway) Johan Aanes Andersen - Mjølner
- (Lithuania) Artur Juchno - Mjølner
- (Norway) Christian Gauseth - Mjøndalen
- (Norway) Sondre Solholm Johansen - Mjøndalen
- (Norway) Kim André Kristiansen Råde - Mo
- (Norway) Adrian Olsen Teigen - Mo
- (Cameroon) Thomas Amang - Molde
- (Norway) Martin Ellingsen - Molde
- (Iceland) Óttar Magnús Karlsson - Molde
- (Norway) Etzaz Hussain - Molde
- (Iceland) Björn Bergmann Sigurðarson - Molde
- (Norway) Sander Svendsen - Molde
- (Norway) Julian Ellingsen - Mosjøen
- (Norway) Oscar Forsmo Kapskarmo - Mosjøen
- (Norway) Eirik Søfting Høgseth - Mosjøen
- (Norway) Henrik Stokkebø - Moss
- (Norway) Håvard Thun - Moss
- (Norway) Johnny Furdal - Nest-Sotra
- (Norway) Peter Nergaard - Nest-Sotra
- (Norway) Andreas Rødsand - Nest-Sotra
- (Norway) Gaute Vetti - Nest-Sotra
- (Norway) Magne Hoseth - Notodden
- (Norway) Sigurd Hauso Haugen - Odd
- (Norway) Fredrik Oldrup Jensen - Odd
- (Norway) Erik Bjørkli Helgetun - Orkla
- (Norway) Artan Brovina - Ørn-Horten
- (Norway) Niklas Haakenstad - Ørn-Horten
- (Norway) Thomas Lunde Fosen - Os
- (Norway) Joe Lunde - Østsiden
- (Norway) Kim Bentsen - Pors Grenland
- (Norway) Sondre Lindgren Larsen - Pors Grenland
- (Norway) Tobias Lauritsen - Pors Grenland
- (Norway) Torgil Gjertsen - Ranheim
- (Norway) Michael Karlsen - Ranheim
- (Norway) Jacob Tromsdal - Ranheim
- (Norway) Thor Erling Larsen - Randesund
- (Ivory Coast) Emilie Noe Dadjo - Raufoss
- (Norway) Tor Håkon Sveen - Redalen
- (Norway) Vetle Lunde Myhre - Riska
- (Norway) Pål André Helland - Rosenborg
- (Denmark) Mike Jensen - Rosenborg
- (Norway) Anders Konradsen - Rosenborg
- (Norway) Birger Meling - Rosenborg
- (Norway) Fredrik Midtsjø - Rosenborg
- (Kosovo) Elbasan Rashani - Rosenborg
- (Norway) Tore Reginiussen - Rosenborg
- (Norway) Scott Alexander Fitzgerald - Salangen
- (Norway) Tobias Kvalvik Henriksen - Salangen
- (Norway) Mats Holt - Sandefjord
- (Hungary) Péter Kovács - Sandefjord
- (Norway) Håkon Lorentzen - Sandefjord
- (Norway) Kent Håvard Eriksen - Sandnes Ulf
- (Norway) Nicolai Geertsen - Sandnes Ulf
- (Norway) Tomas Kristoffersen - Sandnes Ulf
- (Norway) Vidar Nisja - Sandnes Ulf
- (Denmark) Matti Lund Nielsen - Sarpsborg 08
- (Norway) Sebastian Jensen - Senja
- (Norway) Simen Rustadbakken - Skedsmo
- (Norway) Hassan Yousef - Skeid
- (Norway) Simen Brekkhus - Sogndal
- (Ghana) Gilbert Koomson - Sogndal
- (Norway) Espen Næss Lund - Sogndal
- (Nigeria) Chidiebere Nwakali - Sogndal
- (Norway) Vegard Meling Marknesse - Sola
- (Norway) Tage Ellingsen - Sortland
- (Norway) Karl Christian Bakkan Karlsen - Sortland
- (Norway) Jone Rugland - Sotra
- (Norway) Benjamin Skulstad Sunde - Spjelkavik
- (Norway) Henry August Isegra - Sprint-Jeløy
- (Norway) Eirik Kaldheim - Sprint-Jeløy
- (Norway) Tobias Christensen - Start
- (Norway) Thomas Sivertsen - Steinkjer
- (Norway) Sondre Stokke - Stjørdals-Blink
- (France) El Hadji Ba - Stabæk
- (Denmark) Tonny Brochmann - Stabæk
- (Ghana) Raymond Gyasi - Stabæk
- (Belgium) Tortol Lumanza - Stabæk
- (Norway) John Hou Sæter - Stabæk
- (Norway) Sami Loulanti - Strømmen
- (Norway) Ulrich Ness - Strømmen
- (Norway) Stian Rasch - Strømmen
- (Norway) Emil Sildnes - Strømmen
- (Norway) Magnus Solum - Strømmen
- (Norway) Abdul-Basit Agouda - Strømsgodset
- (Norway) Mounir Hamoud - Strømsgodset
- (Norway) Marcus Pedersen - Strømsgodset
- (Norway) Asgeir Snekvik - Tillerbyen
- (Norway) Christian Østli - Tønsberg
- (Norway) Marius Brinck Rygel - Tønsberg
- (Norway) Conrad Wallem - Tønsberg
- (Norway) Alexander Cisic - Træff
- (Norway) Mathias Abelsen - Tromsdalen
- (Norway) Christer Johnsgård - Tromsdalen
- (Norway) Jostein Gundersen - Tromsø
- (Norway) Fredrik Michalsen - Tromsø
- (Norway) Thomas Lehne Olsen - Tromsø
- (Norway) Morten Gamst Pedersen - Tromsø
- (Senegal) Elhadji Mour Samb - Tromsø
- (Iceland) Aron Sigurðarson - Tromsø
- (Norway) Kjetil Thoresen - Tynset
- (Somalia) Ciise Aden Abshir - Ullensaker/Kisa
- (Norway) Truls Jørstad - Ullensaker/Kisa
- (Norway) Ole Kristian Langås - Ullensaker/Kisa
- (Norway) Agwa Obiech - Ullern
- (Norway) Aron Dønnum - Vålerenga
- (Nigeria) Chidera Ejuke - Vålerenga
- (Norway) Bård Finne - Vålerenga
- (Norway) Magnus Grødem - Vålerenga
- (Estonia) Enar Jääger - Vålerenga
- (Norway) Herman Stengel - Vålerenga
- (Norway) Sixten Jensen - Vard Haugesund
- (Norway) Andreas Reinsnos Meling - Vard Haugesund
- (Norway) Erling Flotve Myklebust - Vard Haugesund
- (Norway) Thore Pedersen - Vard Haugesund
- (Norway) Mikael Engesvik - Verdal
- (Norway) Adrian Krysian - Verdal
- (Norway) Hans Kristian Nordvoll - Verdal
- (Denmark) Patrick Pedersen - Viking
- (Northern Ireland) Robin Shroot - Viking
- (Norway) Mathias Bringaker - Viking
- (Norway) Kristoffer Haugen - Viking
- (Norway) Stian Michalsen - Viking
- (Norway) Fredrik Malme Kvalsnes - Volda
- (Norway) Mathias Dahlberg - Volda
- (Norway) Endre Arntzen - Vestfossen
- (Norway) Hichem Bekkaoui - Vestfossen

Own goals:

- (Norway) Nicolay Aall Tveit - Fana (26 April 2017 vs Bjarg)
- - Unknown Salangen (26 April 2017 vs Fløya)
- (Norway) Kristoffer Amble Mathisen - Tromsø (26 April 2017 vs Bjørnevatn)
- (Scotland) David Weatherston - Verdal (26 April 2017 vs Kolstad)
- (Poland) Marcel Wawrzynkiewicz - Egersund (31 May 2017 vs Haugesund)
- (Norway) Christer Husa - Florø (31 May 2017 vs Sogndal)
- (Norway) Sondre Rossbach - Odd (9 August 2017 vs Sarpsborg 08)
- (Norway) Sondre Rossbach - Odd (9 August 2017 vs Sarpsborg 08)
- (Norway) Frode Kippe - Lillestrøm (3 December 2017 vs Sarpsborg 08)
