= List of Norwegian football transfers winter 2018–19 =

This is a list of Norwegian football transfers in the 2018–19 winter transfer window by club. Only clubs of the 2019 Eliteserien and 2019 1. divisjon are included.

== Eliteserien ==
=== Bodø/Glimt ===
In: Note: Flags indicate national team as defined under FIFA eligibility rules; some limited exceptions apply. Players may hold more than one non-FIFA nationality.

No.	Pos.	Nation	Player
4	DF	NOR	Vegard Bergan (from (Norway) Odd)
6	FW	NGA	Victor Boniface (from (Nigeria) Real Sapphire)
11	FW	NOR	Jens Petter Hauge (loan return from (Norway) Aalesund)
12	GK	RUS	Nikita Khaykin (from (Israel) Hapoel Kfar Saba)
19	FW	FRA	Amadou Konaté (from (France) Boulogne)
22	MF	NOR	Felix Myhre (on loan from (Norway) Vålerenga)
23	MF	ISL	Oliver Sigurjónsson (loan return from (Iceland) Breiðablik)
29	DF	NOR	Erlend Dahl Reitan (on loan from (Norway) Rosenborg)

Out: Note: Flags indicate national team as defined under FIFA eligibility rules; some limited exceptions apply. Players may hold more than one non-FIFA nationality.

No.	Pos.	Nation	Player
3	DF	NOR	Emil Jonassen (to (Belarus) BATE Borisov)
4	DF	NOR	Martin Bjørnbak (to (Norway) Molde)
5	DF	NOR	Thomas Jacobsen (to (Norway) Fauske/Sprint)
7	MF	NOR	Thomas Drage (to (Norway) Fredrikstad)
8	DF	NOR	Erik Wollen Steen (to (Norway) Åsane)
10	MF	ESP	José Ángel (on loan to (Moldova) Sheriff Tiraspol)
11	FW	NGA	Marco Tagbajumi (to (Saudi Arabia) Najran)
12	GK	POL	Artur Krysiak (to (Poland) Odra Opole)
22	FW	NOR	Kristian Fardal Opseth (to (Turkey) Erzurumspor)
35	FW	NOR	Adrian Skindlo (on loan to (Iceland) Afturelding)
36	DF	NOR	Andreas van der Spa (on loan to (Norway) Alta)

=== Brann ===
In: Note: Flags indicate national team as defined under FIFA eligibility rules; some limited exceptions apply. Players may hold more than one non-FIFA nationality.

No.	Pos.	Nation	Player
1	GK	NOR	Håkon Opdal (from (Norway) Start)
6	DF	SWE	Jesper Löfgren (from (Sweden) Mjällby)
9	MF	NOR	Petter Strand (from (Norway) Molde)
12	GK	NOR	Eirik Johansen (from (Norway) Sandefjord)
19	FW	NOR	Veton Berisha (from (Austria) Rapid Wien)
20	FW	NOR	Marcus Mehnert (from (Norway) Asker)
23	MF	NOR	Kristoffer Løkberg (from (Norway) Ranheim)

Out: Note: Flags indicate national team as defined under FIFA eligibility rules; some limited exceptions apply. Players may hold more than one non-FIFA nationality.

No.	Pos.	Nation	Player
1	GK	AUT	Samuel Şahin-Radlinger (loan return to (Germany) Hannover 96)
6	DF	ISL	Viðar Ari Jónsson (to (Norway) Sandefjord, previously on loan at (Iceland) FH)
7	MF	NOR	Peter Orry Larsen (to (Norway) Aalesund)
11	FW	NOR	Steffen Lie Skålevik (to (Norway) Sarpsborg 08)
12	GK	NOR	Markus Olsen Pettersen (on loan to (Norway) Nest-Sotra)
19	MF	CRC	Deyver Vega (to (Norway) Vålerenga)
20	MF	NOR	Halldor Stenevik (to (Norway) Strømsgodset)
20	FW	NOR	Marcus Mehnert (on loan to (Norway) Nest-Sotra)
25	MF	NOR	Daniel Braaten (to (Norway) Stabæk)
34	FW	NOR	Marius Bildøy (on loan to (Norway) Åsane)
35	DF	NOR	Nicholas Marthinussen (on loan to (Norway) Sotra)

=== Haugesund ===
In: Note: Flags indicate national team as defined under FIFA eligibility rules; some limited exceptions apply. Players may hold more than one non-FIFA nationality.

No.	Pos.	Nation	Player
1	GK	POL	Maciej Gostomski (from (Poland) Cracovia)
2	DF	SWE	Doug Bergqvist (on loan from (Sweden) Östersund)
5	DF	DEN	Benjamin Hansen (from (Denmark) Nordsjælland)
10	MF	NOR	Niklas Sandberg (from (Norway) Start)
11	MF	NOR	Martin Samuelsen (on loan from (England) West Ham United)
13	MF	NOR	Kristoffer Gunnarshaug (from (Norway) Lysekloster)
17	FW	SEN	Ibrahima Wadji (from (Norway) Molde, previously on loan)
19	DF	DEN	Mikkel Desler (from (Denmark) OB)
23	MF	NOR	Thore Pedersen (from (Norway) Vard Haugesund)
32	GK	NOR	Frank Stople (promoted from junior squad)
33	FW	NOR	Kristoffer Velde (loan return from (Norway) Nest-Sotra)

Out: Note: Flags indicate national team as defined under FIFA eligibility rules; some limited exceptions apply. Players may hold more than one non-FIFA nationality.

No.	Pos.	Nation	Player
1	GK	NOR	Per Kristian Bråtveit (to (Sweden) Djurgården)
5	DF	CRO	Marko Cosic (to (Slovenia) Rudar Velenje)
9	MF	DEN	Frederik Gytkjær (to (Denmark) Lyngby)
15	MF	NGA	Izuchuckwu Anthony (on loan to (Norway) Nest-Sotra)
17	FW	NGA	Shuaibu Ibrahim (on loan to (Israel) Bnei Sakhnin, previously on loan at (Norway) Kongsvinger)
18	DF	NOR	Vegard Skjerve (retired)
19	DF	NOR	Kristoffer Haraldseid (to (Norway) Molde)
21	MF	NOR	Tobias Svendsen (loan return to (Norway) Molde)
24	GK	NOR	Herman Fossdal (on loan to (Norway) Djerv 1919)
33	FW	NOR	Kristoffer Velde (on loan to (Norway) Nest-Sotra)
77	MF	NGA	David Akintola (loan return to (Denmark) Midtjylland)

=== Kristiansund ===
In: Note: Flags indicate national team as defined under FIFA eligibility rules; some limited exceptions apply. Players may hold more than one non-FIFA nationality.

No.	Pos.	Nation	Player
1	GK	IRL	Sean McDermott (from (Romania) Dinamo București)
8	MF	SWE	Haris Cirak (from (Norway) Nest-Sotra)
16	FW	FRO	Meinhard Olsen (from (Faroe Islands) B36 Tórshavn)
17	FW	NOR	Kristoffer Hoven (from (Norway) Hønefoss)
18	DF	NOR	Christopher Lindquist (on loan from (Norway) Strømsgodset)
20	FW	CMR	Thomas Amang (on loan from (Norway) Molde)
26	DF	NOR	Max Normann Williamsen (promoted from junior squad)
30	GK	SEN	Serigne Mor Mbaye (from (Iceland) Víkingur)

Out: Note: Flags indicate national team as defined under FIFA eligibility rules; some limited exceptions apply. Players may hold more than one non-FIFA nationality.

No.	Pos.	Nation	Player
1	GK	IRL	Sean McDermott (to (Romania) Dinamo București)
2	DF	NOR	Joakim Bjerkås (on loan to (Norway) Sunndal, previously on loan at (Norway) Levanger)
10	MF	NOR	Sverre Økland (to (Norway) Ull/Kisa)
16	MF	NOR	Jonas Rønningen (to (Norway) Kongsvinger)
18	MF	NOR	Stian Aasmundsen (to (Norway) Mjøndalen)
20	FW	SWE	Simon Alexandersson (on loan to (Sweden) Dalkurd)
23	GK	SWE	Conny Månsson (to (Norway) Dahle)

=== Lillestrøm ===
In: Note: Flags indicate national team as defined under FIFA eligibility rules; some limited exceptions apply. Players may hold more than one non-FIFA nationality.

No.	Pos.	Nation	Player
4	DF	DEN	Tobias Salquist (from (Belgium) Waasland-Beveren)
7	MF	SWE	Daniel Gustavsson (from (Sweden) Elfsborg)
18	MF	NGA	Moses Ebiye (loan return from (Norway) Strømmen)
21	MF	MSR	Alex Dyer (on loan from (Sweden) Elfsborg)
27	DF	NOR	Josef Baccay (promoted from junior squad)
28	MF	NOR	Magnus Nordengen Knudsen (promoted from junior squad)
40	GK	NOR	Mads Hedenstad Christiansen (promoted from junior squad)
42	DF	NOR	Philip Slørdahl (promoted from junior squad)

Out: Note: Flags indicate national team as defined under FIFA eligibility rules; some limited exceptions apply. Players may hold more than one non-FIFA nationality.

No.	Pos.	Nation	Player
4	DF	NOR	Marius Amundsen (released)
6	MF	NGA	Ifeanyi Mathew (on loan to (Turkey) Osmanlıspor)
8	MF	NGA	Charles Ezeh (on loan to (Norway) Hamkam, previously on loan at (Norway) Strømmen)
9	FW	ENG	Gary Martin (to (Iceland) Valur)
11	FW	NOR	Erling Knudtzon (to (Norway) Molde)
22	DF	SRB	Stefan Antonijevic (to (Norway) Sogndal)
26	DF	NOR	Lars Ranger (on loan to (Norway) Ull/Kisa)
—	MF	NOR	Petter Mathias Olsen (on loan to (Norway) Hamkam, previously on loan at (Norway) Strømmen)
—	DF	SWE	Martin Falkeborn (to (Sweden) Syrianska, previously on loan at (Sweden) Frej)
—	FW	NOR	Tobias Gran (to (Norway) FK Tønsberg, previously on loan at HamKam)

=== Mjøndalen ===
In: Note: Flags indicate national team as defined under FIFA eligibility rules; some limited exceptions apply. Players may hold more than one non-FIFA nationality.

No.	Pos.	Nation	Player
8	FW	NOR	Fredrik Brustad (from (Norway) Molde)
9	FW	NOR	Sondre Liseth (from (Norway) Nest-Sotra)
12	GK	NOR	Julian Faye Lund (on loan from (Norway) Rosenborg)
16	MF	ISL	Dagur Dan Þórhallsson (on loan from (Iceland) Keflavík)
20	DF	NGA	Akeem Latifu (from (Norway) Sogndal)
32	GK	NOR	Mathias Eriksen Ranmark (on loan from (Norway) Molde)
33	MF	NOR	Stian Aasmundsen (from (Norway) Kristiansund)

Out: Note: Flags indicate national team as defined under FIFA eligibility rules; some limited exceptions apply. Players may hold more than one non-FIFA nationality.

No.	Pos.	Nation	Player
16	MF	NOR	Mads Gundersen (to (Norway) Åssiden)
18	FW	NOR	Andreas Hellum (on loan to (Norway) Strømmen, previously on loan at (Norway) Nybergsund-Trysil)
19	MF	NOR	Jonathan Lindseth (to (Norway) Sarpsborg 08)
20	FW	SEN	Ousseynou Boye (to (Egypt) El Gouna)
—	MF	NOR	Sebastian Temte Hansen (on loan to (Norway) Notodden, previously on loan at (Norway) Ørn-Horten)

=== Molde ===
In: Note: Flags indicate national team as defined under FIFA eligibility rules; some limited exceptions apply. Players may hold more than one non-FIFA nationality.

No.	Pos.	Nation	Player
2	DF	NOR	Martin Bjørnbak (from (Norway) Bodø/Glimt)
8	MF	NOR	Fredrik Sjølstad (from (Norway) Kongsvinger)
14	FW	NOR	Erling Knudtzon (from (Norway) Lillestrøm)
18	DF	NOR	Kristoffer Haraldseid (from (Norway) Haugesund)
23	FW	NOR	Eirik Ulland Andersen (from (Norway) Strømsgodset)
30	MF	CIV	Mathis Bolly (free transfer)
99	FW	NOR	Ohi Omoijuanfo (from (Norway) Stabæk)

Out: Note: Flags indicate national team as defined under FIFA eligibility rules; some limited exceptions apply. Players may hold more than one non-FIFA nationality.

No.	Pos.	Nation	Player
2	DF	SWE	Isak Ssewankambo (to (Sweden) Östersund)
6	DF	NOR	Stian Rode Gregersen (on loan to (Sweden) Elfsborg)
8	MF	SEN	Babacar Sarr (to (Russia) Yenisey Krasnoyarsk)
13	FW	SEN	Ibrahima Wadji (to (Norway) Haugesund, previously on loan)
14	MF	NOR	Petter Strand (to (Norway) Brann)
15	DF	FRO	Sonni Nattestad (to (Denmark) Fredericia, previously on loan at (Denmark) Horsens)
20	FW	CMR	Thomas Amang (on loan to (Norway) Kristiansund)
21	MF	NOR	Tobias Svendsen (on loan to (Norway) Sandefjord, previously on loan at (Norway) Haugesund)
24	FW	SWE	Paweł Cibicki (loan return to (England) Leeds United)
25	FW	ISL	Óttar Magnús Karlsson (to (Sweden) Mjällby, previously on loan at (Sweden) Trelleborg)
26	GK	NOR	Mathias Eriksen Ranmark (on loan to (Norway) Mjøndalen)
27	FW	NGA	Daniel Chima Chukwu (on loan to (China) Heilongjiang Lava Spring)
30	FW	NOR	Erling Haaland (to (Austria) Red Bull Salzburg)
33	FW	NOR	Fredrik Brustad (to (Norway) Mjøndalen, previously on loan at (Scotland) Hamilton Academical)
38	DF	NOR	Simen Hagbø (on loan to (Norway) Brattvåg)
49	FW	NOR	Sivert Gussiås (on loan to (Norway) Strømmen)
—	DF	NOR	Martin Ove Roseth (on loan to (Norway) Sogndal, previously on loan at (Norway) Levanger)
—	MF	BRA	Agnaldo (to (Finland) RoPS, previously on loan)

=== Odd ===
In: Note: Flags indicate national team as defined under FIFA eligibility rules; some limited exceptions apply. Players may hold more than one non-FIFA nationality.

No.	Pos.	Nation	Player
7	MF	NOR	Fredrik Oldrup Jensen (on loan from (Belgium) Zulte Waregem)
10	FW	NOR	Sander Svendsen (on loan from (Sweden) Hammarby)
12	GK	NOR	Egil Selvik (from (Norway) Sandnes Ulf)
31	FW	NOR	Andreas Helmersen (on loan from (Norway) Rosenborg)

Out: Note: Flags indicate national team as defined under FIFA eligibility rules; some limited exceptions apply. Players may hold more than one non-FIFA nationality.

No.	Pos.	Nation	Player
4	DF	NOR	Vegard Bergan (to (Norway) Bodø/Glimt)
7	MF	SWE	Martin Broberg (to (Sweden) Örebro)
12	GK	NOR	Viljar Myhra (to (Norway) Strømsgodset)
13	MF	NOR	Stefan Mladenovic (to (Norway) Sandefjord)
15	DF	NOR	Andreas Nordvik (released)

=== Ranheim ===
In: Note: Flags indicate national team as defined under FIFA eligibility rules; some limited exceptions apply. Players may hold more than one non-FIFA nationality.

No.	Pos.	Nation	Player
2	DF	NOR	Jørgen Olsen Øveraas (from (Norway) Egersund)
16	MF	NOR	Olaus Jair Skarsem (on loan from (Norway) Rosenborg)
18	FW	NOR	Ivar Sollie Rønning (from (Norway) HamKam)
19	DF	NOR	Glenn Walker (loan return from (Norway) Stjørdals-Blink)
21	DF	NOR	Torbjørn Lysaker Heggem (on loan from (Norway) Rosenborg)
22	FW	NOR	Erlend Sørhøy (from (Norway) Kolstad)
23	FW	ESP	Adrià Mateo López (from (Norway) Levanger)
25	MF	NOR	Marius Augdal (loan return from (Norway) Stjørdals-Blink)
—	MF	NOR	Fredrik Vinje (from Rosenborg 2)

Out: Note: Flags indicate national team as defined under FIFA eligibility rules; some limited exceptions apply. Players may hold more than one non-FIFA nationality.

No.	Pos.	Nation	Player
4	DF	NOR	Karl Morten Eek (to Steinkjer)
14	FW	NOR	Mats Lillebo (on loan to (Norway) Stjørdals-Blink)
16	MF	NOR	Kristoffer Løkberg (to (Norway) Brann)
21	MF	NOR	Jakob Tromsdal (on loan to (Norway) Stjørdals-Blink)
22	MF	NOR	Sivert Solli (on loan to (Norway) Stjørdals-Blink)
23	DF	NOR	Aslak Fonn Witry (to (Sweden) Djurgården)
27	FW	NOR	Andreas Helmersen (loan return to (Norway) Rosenborg)
—	MF	NOR	Fredrik Vinje (on loan to (Norway) Stjørdals-Blink)

=== Rosenborg ===
In: Note: Flags indicate national team as defined under FIFA eligibility rules; some limited exceptions apply. Players may hold more than one non-FIFA nationality.

No.	Pos.	Nation	Player
17	FW	NGA	David Akintola (on loan from (Denmark) Midtjylland)
19	DF	NOR	Gustav Valsvik (from (Germany) Eintracht Braunschweig)
22	MF	NOR	Gjermund Åsen (from (Norway) Tromsø)
37	MF	NOR	Mikael Tørset Johnsen (promoted from junior squad)

Out: Note: Flags indicate national team as defined under FIFA eligibility rules; some limited exceptions apply. Players may hold more than one non-FIFA nationality.

No.	Pos.	Nation	Player
10	FW	ISL	Matthías Vilhjálmsson (to (Norway) Vålerenga)
17	FW	SWE	Jonathan Levi (on loan to (Sweden) Elfsborg)
19	FW	NOR	Andreas Helmersen (on loan to (Norway) Odd, previously loan to (Norway) Ranheim)
20	DF	AUS	Alex Gersbach (to (Netherlands) NAC Breda)
21	DF	NOR	Erlend Dahl Reitan (on loan to (Norway) Bodø/Glimt)
27	FW	TUN	Issam Jebali (to (Saudi Arabia) Al-Wehda)
33	GK	NOR	Julian Faye Lund (on loan to (Norway) Mjøndalen, previously on loan at (Norway) Levanger)
36	MF	NOR	Olaus Jair Skarsem (on loan to (Norway) Ranheim)
—	DF	NOR	Torbjørn Lysaker Heggem (on loan to (Norway) Ranheim)
—	MF	NOR	Tobias Bjørnebye (on loan to (Norway) Hødd)
—	DF	DEN	Malte Amundsen (to (Denmark) Vejle, previously on loan at (Germany) Eintracht Braunschweig)
—	DF	NOR	Robert Behson-Courage Williams (to (Norway) Stjørdals-Blink)

=== Sarpsborg 08 ===
In: Note: Flags indicate national team as defined under FIFA eligibility rules; some limited exceptions apply. Players may hold more than one non-FIFA nationality.

No.	Pos.	Nation	Player
5	DF	CRC	Pablo Arboine (from (Costa Rica) Santos)
6	DF	NOR	Nicolai Næss (from (Netherlands) Heerenveen)
10	FW	NOR	Steffen Lie Skålevik (from (Norway) Brann)
11	MF	NOR	Jonathan Lindseth (from (Norway) Mjøndalen)
14	MF	CRC	Wílmer Azofeifa (from (Costa Rica) Santos)
18	MF	NOR	Sebastian Jarl (from (Norway) Kjelsås)
28	FW	NOR	Alexander Ruud Tveter (loan return from (Norway) Strømmen)
26	FW	MLI	Ismaila Coulibaly (from (Mali) Duguwolofila)
27	FW	MLI	Boubacar Konté (from (Mali) Etoiles Mandé)
33	DF	NOR	Isak Heen Berge (from (Norway) Follo)
44	DF	TRI	Sheldon Bateau (from (Russia) Krylia Sovetov Samara)
88	FW	NOR	Lars Jørgen Salvesen (from (Norway) Ull/Kisa)

Out: Note: Flags indicate national team as defined under FIFA eligibility rules; some limited exceptions apply. Players may hold more than one non-FIFA nationality.

No.	Pos.	Nation	Player
2	DF	NOR	Sulayman Bojang (on loan to (Norway) Kongsvinger)
5	DF	ISL	Orri Sigurður Ómarsson (to (Iceland) Valur)
6	DF	EST	Joonas Tamm (loan return to (Estonia) Flora)
10	MF	NOR	Tobias Heintz (to (Turkey) Kasımpaşa)
11	DF	NOR	Joackim Jørgensen (to (Norway) Start)
14	MF	NGA	Mohammed Usman (to (Armenia) Pyunik)
18	FW	DEN	Mikkel Agger (to (Denmark) Viborg)
23	MF	NOR	Harmeet Singh (to (Finland) HJK)
24	FW	NOR	Amani Mbedule (to (Norway) Kråkerøy, previously on loan at (Norway) Notodden)
27	MF	FRA	Rashad Muhammed (to (Turkey) Erzurum BB)
30	DF	CRO	Nikola Tkalčić (released, previously on loan at (Norway) Aalesund)
69	FW	DEN	Patrick Mortensen (to (Denmark) AGF Aarhus)

=== Stabæk ===
In: Note: Flags indicate national team as defined under FIFA eligibility rules; some limited exceptions apply. Players may hold more than one non-FIFA nationality.

No.	Pos.	Nation	Player
9	FW	NOR	Sindre Mauritz-Hansen (loan return from (Norway) Strømmen)
11	MF	ZIM	Matthew Rusike (from (South Africa) Cape Town City)
13	MF	NOR	Younes Amer (from (Norway) Nordstrand)
17	FW	NOR	Daniel Braaten (from (Norway) Brann)
21	DF	EST	Madis Vihmann (on loan from (Estonia) Flora)
22	FW	HUN	Alexander Torvund (from (Norway) Ullern)
30	MF	NOR	Peder Vogt (promoted from junior squad)
84	GK	NOR	Jonas Brauti (from (Norway) Ullern)

Out: Note: Flags indicate national team as defined under FIFA eligibility rules; some limited exceptions apply. Players may hold more than one non-FIFA nationality.

No.	Pos.	Nation	Player
6	DF	NOR	Håkon Skogseid (retired)
8	MF	NOR	John Hou Sæter (to (China) Beijing Guo'an)
9	FW	NOR	Abdul-Basit Agouda (to (Norway) KFUM)
11	MF	NOR	Moussa Njie (to (Serbia) Partizan Belgrade)
15	DF	NOR	Morten Renå Olsen (on loan to (Norway) Notodden)
19	MF	CIV	Aboubakar Keita (loan return to (Denmark) F.C. Copenhagen)
21	DF	NOR	Daniel Granli (to (Sweden) AIK)
77	MF	SVN	Filip Valenčič (on loan to (Finland) Inter Turku)
99	FW	NOR	Ohi Omoijuanfo (to (Norway) Molde)

=== Strømsgodset ===
In: Note: Flags indicate national team as defined under FIFA eligibility rules; some limited exceptions apply. Players may hold more than one non-FIFA nationality.

No.	Pos.	Nation	Player
1	GK	NOR	Viljar Myhra (from (Norway) Odd)
14	MF	NOR	Nicholas Mickelson (from (Norway) Ham-Kam)
19	MF	NOR	Halldor Stenevik (from (Norway) Brann)
23	MF	DEN	Martin Spelmann (from (Denmark) AGF)
25	DF	NOR	Stian Ringstad (loan return from (Norway) Sandefjord)
29	MF	MLI	Yacouba Sylla (from (Belgium) Mechelen)

Out: Note: Flags indicate national team as defined under FIFA eligibility rules; some limited exceptions apply. Players may hold more than one non-FIFA nationality.

No.	Pos.	Nation	Player
1	GK	NOR	Espen Bugge Pettersen (retired)
4	DF	NOR	Kim André Madsen (to (Norway) Asker)
17	DF	NOR	Christopher Lindquist (on loan to (Norway) Kristiansund)
19	MF	GNB	Francisco Júnior (to (Denmark) Vendsyssel)
20	GK	NOR	Pål Vestly Heigre (to (Norway) Sandnes Ulf)
21	MF	NOR	Mathias Gjerstrøm (on loan to (Norway) Kongsvinger, previously on loan at (Norway) Notodden)
23	FW	NOR	Eirik Ulland Andersen (to (Norway) Molde)
35	DF	NOR	Arnar Thor Gudjonsson (on loan to (Norway) Fram Larvik)
66	MF	NOR	Andreas Hoven (on loan to (Norway) Nest-Sotra)
93	FW	NOR	Tokmac Nguen (to (Hungary) Ferencváros)
—	FW	NOR	Simen Hammershaug (on loan to (Norway) Asker)

=== Tromsø ===
In: Note: Flags indicate national team as defined under FIFA eligibility rules; some limited exceptions apply. Players may hold more than one non-FIFA nationality.

No.	Pos.	Nation	Player
5	DF	NOR	Anders Jenssen (from (Norway) Tromsdalen)
6	DF	FIN	Juha Pirinen (from (Finland) HJK)
8	MF	DEN	Oliver Kjærgaard (loan return from (Norway) Nest-Sotra)
27	MF	NOR	August Mikkelsen (loan return from (Norway) Tromsdalen)

Out: Note: Flags indicate national team as defined under FIFA eligibility rules; some limited exceptions apply. Players may hold more than one non-FIFA nationality.

No.	Pos.	Nation	Player
2	DF	NOR	Tom Høgli (retired)
6	MF	NOR	Christian Landu Landu (to (Norway) Sandnes Ulf)
9	FW	SVN	Slobodan Vuk (to (Slovenia) Domžale, previously on loan)
14	DF	NOR	Hans Norbye (to (Norway) Hamkam)
23	MF	NOR	Gjermund Åsen (to (Norway) Rosenborg)
—	MF	NOR	Henrik Johnsgård (on loan to (Norway) Senja, previously on loan at (Norway) Tromsdalen)
—	DF	SEN	Mehdi Dioury (to (Senegal) Diambars, previously on loan at (Norway) Tromsdalen)
—	FW	NOR	Brage Berg Pedersen (on loan to (Norway) Alta)
—		NOR	Gustav Severinsen (on loan to (Norway) Alta)

=== Viking ===
In: Note: Flags indicate national team as defined under FIFA eligibility rules; some limited exceptions apply. Players may hold more than one non-FIFA nationality.

No.	Pos.	Nation	Player
5	DF	ISL	Axel Andrésson (from (England) Reading, previously on loan)
6	DF	NOR	Runar Hove (from (Norway) Florø)
19	FW	NOR	Jostein Ekeland (from (Norway) Vidar)
27	MF	ISL	Samúel Friðjónsson (on loan from (Norway) Vålerenga)

Out: Note: Flags indicate national team as defined under FIFA eligibility rules; some limited exceptions apply. Players may hold more than one non-FIFA nationality.

No.	Pos.	Nation	Player
2	DF	NOR	Rasmus Martinsen (to (Norway) Brodd)
5	DF	NOR	Markus Nakkim (loan return to (Norway) Vålerenga)
17	MF	DEN	Steffen Ernemann (to (Norway) Sogndal)
19	DF	NOR	Kristian Novak (to (Norway) Sola)
22	DF	DEN	Claes Kronberg (released)
24	MF	NOR	Jonas Pereira (to (Norway) Fram Larvik)

=== Vålerenga ===
In: Note: Flags indicate national team as defined under FIFA eligibility rules; some limited exceptions apply. Players may hold more than one non-FIFA nationality.

No.	Pos.	Nation	Player
1	GK	NOR	Kjetil Haug (on loan from (Norway) Sogndal)
2	DF	NOR	Markus Nakkim (loan return from (Norway) Viking)
5	DF	MEX	Efraín Juárez (from (Canada) Vancouver Whitecaps)
6	MF	KOS	Herolind Shala (from (Norway) Start)
7	MF	CRC	Deyver Vega (from (Norway) Brann)
9	FW	NOR	Fitim Azemi (loan return from (Norway) Sandefjord)
10	FW	ISL	Matthías Vilhjálmsson (from (Norway) Rosenborg)
15	MF	NOR	Odin Thiago Holm (from (Norway) Ranheim 2)
17	MF	NOR	Leo Cornic (promoted from junior squad)
24	DF	NOR	Oskar Opsahl (promoted from junior squad)

Out: Note: Flags indicate national team as defined under FIFA eligibility rules; some limited exceptions apply. Players may hold more than one non-FIFA nationality.

No.	Pos.	Nation	Player
7	MF	NOR	Daniel Fredheim Holm (to (Norway) KFUM Oslo)
15	MF	NOR	Odin Thiago Holm (on loan to (Norway) Tiller)
18	DF	NOR	Christian Borchgrevink (on loan to (Norway) Notodden, previously on loan at (Norway) HamKam)
27	MF	ISL	Samúel Friðjónsson (on loan to (Norway) Viking)
29	MF	NOR	Magnus Grødem (on loan to (Norway) Ull-Kisa)
33	DF	NOR	Amin Nouri (on loan to (Belgium) KV Oostende)
38	DF	NOR	Kristoffer Hay (to (Norway) Aalesund, previously on loan at Tromsdalen)

== 1. divisjon ==
=== Aalesund ===
In: Note: Flags indicate national team as defined under FIFA eligibility rules; some limited exceptions apply. Players may hold more than one non-FIFA nationality.

No.	Pos.	Nation	Player
9	FW	NOR	Niklas Castro (from (Norway) Kongsvinger)
18	DF	ISL	Davíð Kristján Ólafsson (from (Iceland) Breidablik)
21	MF	NOR	Peter Orry Larsen (from (Norway) Brann)
22	DF	NOR	Tega George (from (Norway) Kjelsås)
24	GK	NOR	Enock Mawete Mwimba (from (Denmark) Midtylland U19)
25	DF	NOR	Kristoffer Hay (from (Norway) Vålerenga)

Out: Note: Flags indicate national team as defined under FIFA eligibility rules; some limited exceptions apply. Players may hold more than one non-FIFA nationality.

No.	Pos.	Nation	Player
21	FW	NOR	Jens Petter Hauge (loan return to (Norway) Bodø/Glimt)
22	DF	ISL	Adam Örn Arnarson (to (Poland) Górnik Zabrze)
30	DF	CRO	Nikola Tkalčić (loan return to (Norway) Sarpsborg 08)
—		SWE	Valmir Berisha (to (Bosnia and Herzegovina) Velez Mostar, previously on loan at (Iceland) Fjölnir)

=== HamKam ===
In: Note: Flags indicate national team as defined under FIFA eligibility rules; some limited exceptions apply. Players may hold more than one non-FIFA nationality.

No.	Pos.	Nation	Player
2	DF	NOR	Patrick Alfei Sæbø (from (Norway) Ottestad)
3	DF	NOR	Benjamin Gleditsch (from (Norway) Grorud)
5	DF	FRO	Odmar Færø (from (Faroe Islands) B36 Torshavn)
6	MF	NOR	Lars Gunnar Johnsen (from (Norway) Tromsdalen)
9	FW	NOR	Jonas Enkerud (from (Norway) Elverum)
10	MF	NOR	Emil Sildnes (from (Norway) Strømmen)
14	DF	NOR	Steffen Skogvang Pedersen (from (Norway) Tromsdalen)
18	FW	NOR	Jean Alassane Mendy (from (Scotland) Dundee)
19	MF	NGA	Charles Ezeh (on loan from (Norway) Lillestrøm)
20	MF	NOR	Petter Mathias Olsen (on loan from (Norway) Lillestrøm)
24	DF	NOR	Hans Norbye (from (Norway) Tromsø)

Out: Note: Flags indicate national team as defined under FIFA eligibility rules; some limited exceptions apply. Players may hold more than one non-FIFA nationality.

No.	Pos.	Nation	Player
2	DF	NOR	Christian Borchgrevink (loan return to (Norway) Vålerenga)
9	FW	NOR	Ivar Sollie Rønning (to (Norway) Ranheim)
10	MF	NOR	Truls Jevne Hagen (to (Norway) Moelven)
14	MF	NOR	Nicholas Mickelson (to (Norway) Strømsgodset)
15	FW	SWE	Isac Lidberg (loan return to (Norway) Start)
18	FW	NED	Xander Houtkoop (released)
19	MF	NOR	Sander Eng Strand (on loan to (Norway) Elverum)
20	FW	NOR	Tobias Gran (loan return to (Norway) Lillestrøm)
27	FW	NOR	Peder Nersveen (to (Faroe Islands) NSI Runavik)
99	MF	NGA	Abubakar Aliyu Ibrahim (on loan to (Norway) Notodden)
—	DF	NOR	Ådne Midtskogen (to (Norway) Elverum, previously on loan at (Norway) Nybergsund)
—	GK	NOR	Lars Jendal (on loan to (Norway) Asker, previously on loan at (Norway) Nybergsund)

=== Jerv ===
In: Note: Flags indicate national team as defined under FIFA eligibility rules; some limited exceptions apply. Players may hold more than one non-FIFA nationality.

No.	Pos.	Nation	Player
1	GK	NOR	Benjamin Boujar (from (Norway) Start)
2	DF	NOR	Torje Wichne (from (Norway) Fløy)
7	DF	NOR	Simon Larsen (from (Norway) Start)
15		NOR	Halvor Hovstad (loan return from (Norway) Vindbjart)
16		NOR	Tobias Wangerud (promoted from junior squad)
21		NOR	Tor Axel Bringsverd (promoted from junior squad)
22	FW	NOR	Markus Brændsrød (on loan from (Norway) Sogndal)
23	FW	NOR	Ole Marius Håbestad (from (Norway) Express)
25	MF	NGA	Michael Ogungbaro (on loan from (Norway) Start)
27	FW	NOR	Chuma Anene (on loan from (Denmark) Midtjylland)
96	FW	NGA	Anthony Okachi (on loan from (Nigeria) Comets)

Out: Note: Flags indicate national team as defined under FIFA eligibility rules; some limited exceptions apply. Players may hold more than one non-FIFA nationality.

No.	Pos.	Nation	Player
1	GK	FIN	Marc Nordqvist (loan return to (Finland) IFK Mariehamn)
2	DF	NOR	Glenn Andersen (retired)
3	DF	NOR	Brice Wembangomo (to (Norway) Sandefjord)
7	FW	NOR	Ulrik Berglann (to (Norway) Arendal)
9	MF	NOR	Tor André Skimmeland Aasheim (to (Norway) Bryne)
23	MF	NOR	Andreas Hagen (to (Norway) Fredrikstad)
29	FW	USA	Sean Okoli (released)
95	FW	NOR	Alexander Lind (to (Norway) Donn)
—		NOR	Simen Aanonsen (to (Norway) Vindbjart, previously on loan)

=== KFUM Oslo ===
In: Note: Flags indicate national team as defined under FIFA eligibility rules; some limited exceptions apply. Players may hold more than one non-FIFA nationality.

No.	Pos.	Nation	Player
1	GK	CAN	Simon Thomas (from (Norway) Strømmen)
6	MF	NOR	Daniel Fredheim Holm (from (Norway) Vålerenga)
9	FW	NOR	Abdul-Basit Agouda (from (Norway) Stabæk)
18	MF	NOR	Olav Øby (from (Norway) Kongsvinger)
28	DF	FRA	Emmanuel Troudart (from (Norway) Ull-Kisa)
29	MF	NOR	Rahul Sharma (promoted from junior squad)
31	DF	NOR	Kristian Brix (from (Norway) Sandnes Ulf)

Out: Note: Flags indicate national team as defined under FIFA eligibility rules; some limited exceptions apply. Players may hold more than one non-FIFA nationality.

No.	Pos.	Nation	Player
1	GK	NOR	Anders Mattingsdal (retired)
18		NOR	Erik Stafford Germundsson (to (Norway) Skjetten)
25		NOR	Yassin Rfifi (released)
30		NOR	Mohammed Jatta (to (Norway) Kjelsås)
—		NOR	Aron Christensen (to (Norway) Bærum)
—		NOR	Alessandro Caroprese (to (Norway) Drøbak-Frogn)

=== Kongsvinger ===
In: Note: Flags indicate national team as defined under FIFA eligibility rules; some limited exceptions apply. Players may hold more than one non-FIFA nationality.

No.	Pos.	Nation	Player
6	DF	FIN	Ville Jalasto (from (Finland) HJK)
7	MF	KOR	Gyuhwan Lee (from (South Korea) )
11	MF	SWE	Simon Marklund (from (Sweden) Åtvidaberg)
12	GK	NOR	Stian Bolstad (from (Norway) Strømmen)
22	FW	NOR	Ludvig Langrekken (loan return from (Norway) Asker)
23	MF	NOR	Martin Vinjor (loan return from (Norway) Asker)
25	DF	NOR	Sulayman Bojang (on loan from (Norway) Sarpsborg 08)
27	MF	CMR	Landry N'Guemo (free transfer)
28	MF	NOR	Jonas Rønningen (from (Norway) Kristiansund)
29	MF	NOR	Mathias Gjerstrøm (on loan from (Norway) Strømsgodset)
30	GK	COM	Ali Ahamada (from (Turkey) Kayserispor)
31	GK	NOR	Andreas Smedplass (promoted from junior squad)
33	DF	NOR	Matias Rogstad Aadnøy (promoted from junior squad)
46	FW	NOR	Sander Røed (promoted from junior squad)

Out: Note: Flags indicate national team as defined under FIFA eligibility rules; some limited exceptions apply. Players may hold more than one non-FIFA nationality.

No.	Pos.	Nation	Player
6	MF	SWE	Johan Wennberg (to (Norway) Florø)
7	FW	NOR	Niklas Castro (to (Norway) Aalesund)
11	MF	NOR	Olav Øby (to (Norway) KFUM)
14	MF	NOR	Markus Skjellum (released)
20	MF	NOR	Even Bydal (on loan to (Norway) Asker)
23	MF	NOR	Fredrik Sjølstad (to (Norway) Molde)
26	FW	NGA	Shuaibu Ibrahim (loan return to (Norway) Haugesund)
27	GK	GER	Tobias Trautner (to (Germany) Sportfreunde Lotte)
77	GK	KEN	Arnold Origi (to (Finland) HIFK)
93	GK	RUS	Aleksei Gorodovoy (to (Russia) Rubin Kazan)
—	GK	NOR	Idar Nordby Lysgård (to (Norway) Skeid, previously on loan)

=== Nest-Sotra ===
In: Note: Flags indicate national team as defined under FIFA eligibility rules; some limited exceptions apply. Players may hold more than one non-FIFA nationality.

No.	Pos.	Nation	Player
1	GK	NED	Renze Fij (from (Norway) Florø)
4	MF	NOR	Jonas Hestetun (from (Norway) Åsane)
7	FW	NOR	Jo Sondre Aas (from (Norway) Levanger)
8	MF	NOR	Lars Christian Kjemhus (from (Norway) Sogndal)
9	FW	DEN	Lee Rochester Sørensen (from (Denmark) HB Køge)
14	MF	NOR	Thor Økland (from (Norway) Fyllingsdalen)
17	MF	NOR	Vladan Radojkic (from (Norway) Lysekloster)
19	MF	NOR	Andreas Hoven (on loan from (Norway) Strømsgodset)
20	FW	NOR	Jefferson de Souza (from (Norway) Brodd)
26	MF	NGA	Izuchuckwu Anthony (on loan from (Norway) Haugesund)
27	MF	NOR	Senai Hagos (from (Norway) Åsane)
77	FW	NOR	Marcus Mehnert (on loan from (Norway) Brann)
99	GK	NOR	Markus Olsen Pettersen (on loan from (Norway) Brann)
—	FW	NOR	Kristoffer Velde (on loan from (Norway) Haugesund)

Out: Note: Flags indicate national team as defined under FIFA eligibility rules; some limited exceptions apply. Players may hold more than one non-FIFA nationality.

No.	Pos.	Nation	Player
1	GK	NOR	Egil Selvik (loan return to (Norway) Sandnes Ulf)
3	DF	NOR	Kristoffer Bidne (to (Norway) Sotra)
7	MF	NOR	Morten Bjørlo (to (Norway) Egersund)
8	MF	SWE	Haris Cirak (to (Norway) Kristiansund)
9	FW	NOR	Sondre Liseth (to (Norway) Mjøndalen)
12	DF	NOR	Petter Havsgård Martinsen (to (Norway) Bryne)
14		NOR	Joachim Westrheim (to (Norway) Lysekloster, previously on loan at Brann 2)
20	MF	SWE	Sherko Faiqi (loan return to (Sweden) Sirius)
23		NOR	Bendik Torset (to (Norway) Larsnes/Gursken)
24	MF	SWE	Jacob Palander (loan return to (Sweden) Trelleborg)
86	MF	DEN	Oliver Kjærgaard (loan return to (Norway) Tromsø)
—	FW	NOR	Kristoffer Velde (loan return to (Norway) Haugesund)

=== Notodden ===
In: Note: Flags indicate national team as defined under FIFA eligibility rules; some limited exceptions apply. Players may hold more than one non-FIFA nationality.

No.	Pos.	Nation	Player
3	DF	NOR	Christian Borchgrevink (on loan from (Norway) Vålerenga)
14	DF	NOR	Morten Renå Olsen (on loan from (Norway) Stabæk)
15	MF	NOR	Espen Mogen Hagen (promoted from junior squad)
20	MF	NGA	Abubakar Aliyu Ibrahim (on loan from (Norway) HamKam)
24	FW	NOR	Ebenezer Adu Koranteng (from (Norway) Urædd)
25	MF	NOR	Sebastian Temte Hansen (on loan from (Norway) Mjøndalen)

Out: Note: Flags indicate national team as defined under FIFA eligibility rules; some limited exceptions apply. Players may hold more than one non-FIFA nationality.

No.	Pos.	Nation	Player
3	DF	ESP	Jeffrey Stoof (to (Norway) Elverum)
14	DF	SWE	Jonathan Asp (to (Sweden) Landskrona)
15	DF	NED	Calvin Mac-Intosch (to (Netherlands) Fortuna Sittard)
20	FW	NOR	Amani Mbedule (loan return to (Norway) Sarpsborg 08)
25	MF	NOR	Mathias Gjerstrøm (loan return to (Norway) Strømsgodset)
26	GK	NOR	Jostein Aaland (to Express)

=== Raufoss ===
In: Note: Flags indicate national team as defined under FIFA eligibility rules; some limited exceptions apply. Players may hold more than one non-FIFA nationality.

No.	Pos.	Nation	Player
18	FW	SGP	Ikhsan Fandi (from (Singapore) Young Lions)
19	DF	NOR	Parfait Bizoza (from (Norway) Herd)
20	MF	NOR	Gard Simenstad (from (Norway) Gjøvik-Lyn)
22	MF	NOR	Kristoffer Nessø (from (Norway) Mjølner)

Out: Note: Flags indicate national team as defined under FIFA eligibility rules; some limited exceptions apply. Players may hold more than one non-FIFA nationality.

No.	Pos.	Nation	Player
3	DF	NOR	Kevin Jablinski (to (Norway) Egersund)
17		NOR	Christer Johansen (to (Norway) Byåsen)
20	MF	NOR	Fredrik Greve Monsen (retired)
22	FW	ISL	Ingolfur Örn Kristjansson (to (Norway) Eidsvoll Turn)

=== Sandefjord ===
In: Note: Flags indicate national team as defined under FIFA eligibility rules; some limited exceptions apply. Players may hold more than one non-FIFA nationality.

No.	Pos.	Nation	Player
11	MF	NOR	Tobias Svendsen (on loan from (Norway) Molde)
12	GK	FIN	Walter Viitala (from (Sweden) Malmö)
14	MF	NOR	Stefan Mladenovic (from (Norway) Odd)
16	MF	NOR	Sander Risan Mørk (promoted from junior squad)
19	DF	NOR	Brice Wembangomo (from (Norway) Jerv)
21	DF	SWE	Anton Kralj (from (Sweden) Malmö)
23	DF	ISL	Viðar Ari Jónsson (on loan from (Norway) Brann)
24	MF	ESP	Tito (from (Spain) Reus)

Out: Note: Flags indicate national team as defined under FIFA eligibility rules; some limited exceptions apply. Players may hold more than one non-FIFA nationality.

No.	Pos.	Nation	Player
10	MF	ESP	Pau Morer (to (Lithuania) Zalgiris Vilnius)
11	FW	NOR	Fitim Azemi (loan return to (Norway) Vålerenga)
12	GK	NOR	Eirik Johansen (to (Norway) Brann)
19	DF	SEN	Victor Demba Bindia (to (Jordan) Al-Wehdat)
21	DF	NOR	Stian Ringstad (loan return to (Norway) Strømsgodset)
22	MF	NOR	Mohammed Fellah (released)
—	MF	NOR	Ole Breistøl (on loan to (Norway) Fram)
—	DF	NOR	Herman Solberg Nilsen (on loan to (Norway) Fram, previously on loan)
—	FW	NOR	Håkon Lorentzen (to (Norway) Åsane, previously on loan)
—		NOR	Sabawon Shamohammad (to (Norway) Flint, previously on loan at (Norway) Fram)
—		NOR	Alf Øivind Aslesen (to (Norway) FK Tønsberg, previously on loan at (Norway) Fram)

=== Sandnes Ulf ===
In: Note: Flags indicate national team as defined under FIFA eligibility rules; some limited exceptions apply. Players may hold more than one non-FIFA nationality.

No.	Pos.	Nation	Player
6	MF	NOR	Christian Landu Landu (from (Norway) Tromsø)
7	MF	ESP	Simón Colina (from (Poland) Radomiak Radom)
8	MF	FIN	Johannes Laaksonen (from (Finland) SJK)
17	MF	NOR	Ingvald Halgunset (from (Norway) Vidar)
19	MF	NOR	Kaloyan Kalinov Kostadinov (promoted from junior squad)
20	MF	NOR	Adrian Berntsen (from (Norway) Brodd)
23	GK	NOR	Pål Vestly Heigre (from (Norway) Strømsgodset)
37	FW	NOR	Matteo Vallotto (promoted from junior squad)

Out: Note: Flags indicate national team as defined under FIFA eligibility rules; some limited exceptions apply. Players may hold more than one non-FIFA nationality.

No.	Pos.	Nation	Player
2	MF	NOR	Akinbola Akinyemi (to (Norway) Kjelsås)
6	MF	NED	Niels Vorthoren (released)
7	MF	NOR	Vidar Nisja (retired)
8	MF	NOR	Remi Johansen (to (Norway) Sola)
11	MF	ARU	Erixon Danso (to (Norway) Egersund)
12	GK	LVA	Deniss Korneičiks (to (Norway) Egersund)
17	FW	NOR	Roger Blokhus Ekeland (to (Norway) Os)
20	MF	NOR	Andreas Dybevik (to (Norway) Bryne)
24	MF	NOR	Kristian Brix (to (Norway) KFUM)
27	MF	NOR	Vegard Aasen (to (Norway) Vidar)
92	GK	DEN	Nicklas Frenderup (to (Denmark) Køge)
—	GK	NOR	Egil Selvik (to (Norway) Odd, previously on loan at (Norway) Nest-Sotra)

=== Skeid ===
In: Note: Flags indicate national team as defined under FIFA eligibility rules; some limited exceptions apply. Players may hold more than one non-FIFA nationality.

No.	Pos.	Nation	Player
18	DF	NOR	Fredrik Berglie (from (Norway) Halsen)
19	DF	NOR	Ahmed El Amrani (from (Finland) FC Honka)
23	MF	NOR	Mathias Dahl Abelsen (from (Norway) Tromsdalen)
30	GK	NOR	Idar Nordby Lysgård (from (Norway) Kongsvinger, previously on loan)

Out: Note: Flags indicate national team as defined under FIFA eligibility rules; some limited exceptions apply. Players may hold more than one non-FIFA nationality.

No.	Pos.	Nation	Player
14		NOR	Kevin Mankowitz (to (Norway) Grorud)
27		NOR	Bendik Lind (to (Norway) Ullern)

=== Sogndal ===
In: Note: Flags indicate national team as defined under FIFA eligibility rules; some limited exceptions apply. Players may hold more than one non-FIFA nationality.

No.	Pos.	Nation	Player
4	DF	SRB	Stefan Antonijevic (from (Norway) Lillestrøm)
6	MF	DEN	Steffen Ernemann (from (Norway) Viking)
22	DF	NOR	Eivind Helgesen (promoted from junior squad)
23	MF	NOR	Sivert Mannsverk (promoted from junior squad)
25	FW	SEN	Alioune Ndour (from (Norway) Florø)
37	GK	NOR	Håvard Hetle (loan return from (Norway) Stryn)

Out: Note: Flags indicate national team as defined under FIFA eligibility rules; some limited exceptions apply. Players may hold more than one non-FIFA nationality.

No.	Pos.	Nation	Player
2	DF	NGA	Akeem Latifu (to (Norway) Mjøndalen)
4	DF	NOR	Kjetil Wæhler (retired)
5	DF	EST	Nikita Baranov (to (Bulgaria) Beroe)
6	MF	NOR	Bjørn Helge Riise (retired)
12	GK	NOR	Kjetil Haug (on loan to (Norway) Vålerenga, previously on loan at (Norway) Elverum)
16	DF	ENG	Reiss Greenidge (to (Norway) Arendal)
17	MF	GUI	Mohamed Didé Fofana (on loan (Iceland) Víkingur)
20	FW	NOR	Markus Brændsrød (on loan to (Norway) Jerv)
22	MF	NOR	Lars Christian Kjemhus (to (Norway) Nest-Sotra)
23	FW	NOR	Trond Olsen (retired)
25	MF	DEN	Kasper Nissen (to (Norway) Florø, previously on loan at (Norway) Levanger)
77	DF	MNE	Staniša Mandić (on loan to (Bosnia and Herzegovina) Zrinjski Mostar)
—	FW	NOR	Fredrik Flo (to (Norway) Sotra, previously on loan at (Norway) Fana)

=== Start ===
In: Note: Flags indicate national team as defined under FIFA eligibility rules; some limited exceptions apply. Players may hold more than one non-FIFA nationality.

No.	Pos.	Nation	Player
2	DF	NOR	Jesper Daland (from (Norway) Stabæk 2)
6	DF	NOR	Joackim Jørgensen (from (Norway) Sarpsborg 08)
13	GK	NOR	Alexander Pedersen (from (Norway) Hønefoss)
16	MF	NOR	Mikael Ugland (loan return from (Norway) Flekkerøy)
21	MF	NOR	Sander Sjøkvist (promoted from junior squad)
22	FW	ISL	Kristján Flóki Finnbogason (loan return from (Sweden) Brommapojkarna)

Out: Note: Flags indicate national team as defined under FIFA eligibility rules; some limited exceptions apply. Players may hold more than one non-FIFA nationality.

No.	Pos.	Nation	Player
1	GK	NOR	Håkon Opdal (to (Norway) SK Brann)
2	DF	SWE	Elliot Käck (to (Sweden) Djurgården)
6	DF	NOR	Simon Larsen (to (Norway) Jerv)
8	FW	GHA	Ibrahim Mensah (released)
16	MF	NOR	Andreas Hollingen (released)
21	MF	NOR	Niklas Sandberg (to (Norway) Haugesund)
24	MF	KOS	Herolind Shala (to (Norway) Vålerenga)
25	MF	NGA	Michael Ogungbaro (on loan to (Norway) Jerv, previously on loan at (Norway) Åsane)
33	FW	GHA	Dennis Antwi (to (Sweden) Trelleborg, previously on loan at (Norway) Åsane)
33	FW	SWE	Isac Lidberg (on loan to (Sweden) Brommapojkarna, previously on loan at (Norway) HamKam)
45	GK	NOR	Benjamin Boujar (to (Norway) Jerv, previously on loan at (Norway) Hødd)
—		NOR	Philip Aukland (on loan to (Norway) Fram, previously on loan at (Norway) Arendal)

=== Strømmen ===
In: Note: Flags indicate national team as defined under FIFA eligibility rules; some limited exceptions apply. Players may hold more than one non-FIFA nationality.

No.	Pos.	Nation	Player
2	MF	NOR	Magnus Tvedte (from (Norway) Eidsvold Turn)
7	MF	NOR	Mahmoud Al Laham (from (Norway) Fram)
9	FW	NOR	Sivert Gussiås (on loan from (Norway) Molde)
14	DF	NOR	Håvard Thun (from (Norway) Moss)
16	DF	NOR	John Olav Norheim (from (Norway) Fløy)
18	FW	NOR	Andreas Hellum (on loan from (Norway) Mjøndalen)
20	DF	NOR	Mats André Kaland (from (Norway) Ull/Kisa)
30	GK	NOR	Marius Berntzen (from (Norway) Tromsdalen)
31	GK	NOR	Stian Christensen (from (Norway) Skjetten)

Out: Note: Flags indicate national team as defined under FIFA eligibility rules; some limited exceptions apply. Players may hold more than one non-FIFA nationality.

No.	Pos.	Nation	Player
1	GK	CAN	Simon Thomas (to (Norway) KFUM)
7	MF	NOR	Petter Mathias Olsen (loan return to (Norway) Lillestrøm)
9	FW	NOR	Alexander Ruud Tveter (loan return to (Norway) Sarpsborg 08)
12	GK	NOR	Stian Bolstad (to (Norway) Kongsvinger)
14	FW	NOR	Sindre Mauritz-Hansen (loan return to (Norway) Stabæk)
18	MF	NGA	Charles Ezeh (loan return to (Norway) Lillestrøm)
19	MF	NOR	Emil Sildnes (to (Norway) Hamkam)
20	MF	NGA	Moses Ebiye (loan return to (Norway) Lillestrøm)
77	FW	HAI	Steeve Saint-Duc (loan return to (United States) Los Angeles FC)

=== Tromsdalen ===
In: Note: Flags indicate national team as defined under FIFA eligibility rules; some limited exceptions apply. Players may hold more than one non-FIFA nationality.

No.	Pos.	Nation	Player
3	DF	NOR	Andreas Arntzen (from (Norway) Fløya)
4	DF	NOR	Thomas Braaten (from (Norway) Alta)
5	DF	NOR	Robin Lorentzen (from (Norway) Rosenborg 2)
6	DF	NOR	Henrik Åsali Hanssen (from (Norway) Alta)
8	MF	NOR	Thomas Kind Bendiksen (free transfer)
9	MF	NOR	Tomas Kristoffersen (from (Norway) Åsane)
14	FW	NOR	Gabriel Andersen (from (Norway) Harstad)
15	MF	NOR	Sander Ringberg (from (Norway) Harstad)
16	FW	NOR	Andreas Hanssen (from (Norway) Byåsen)
18	DF	NOR	Henrik Malde Breimyr (from (Norway) Hødd)
45	MF	NOR	Adrian Sandbukt (promoted from junior squad)
46	DF	NOR	Trygve Kristoffersen (promoted from junior squad)

Out: Note: Flags indicate national team as defined under FIFA eligibility rules; some limited exceptions apply. Players may hold more than one non-FIFA nationality.

No.	Pos.	Nation	Player
2	DF	NOR	Steffen Skogvang Pedersen (to (Norway) HamKam)
3	DF	NOR	Anders Jenssen (to (Norway) Tromsø)
4	MF	NOR	Lars Gunnar Johnsen (to (Norway) HamKam)
5	DF	NOR	Tobias Vibe (to (Finland) HIFK)
8		NOR	Tor-Martin Mienna (to (Norway) Senja)
9	MF	NOR	Henrik Johnsgård (loan return to (Norway) Tromsø)
15	DF	NOR	Kristoffer Hay (loan return to (Norway) Vålerenga)
20	FW	NOR	Mohammed Ahamed (to (Norway) Krokelvdalen)
21	MF	NOR	Mathias Dahl Abelsen (to (Norway) Skeid)
27	MF	NOR	August Mikkelsen (loan return to (Norway) Tromsø)
30	GK	NOR	Marius Berntzen (to (Norway) Strømmen)

=== Ull/Kisa ===
In: Note: Flags indicate national team as defined under FIFA eligibility rules; some limited exceptions apply. Players may hold more than one non-FIFA nationality.

No.	Pos.	Nation	Player
3	DF	NOR	Vegard Kongsro (from (Norway) Pors)
7	MF	NOR	Magnus Grødem (on loan from (Norway) Vålerenga)
8	MF	NOR	Sverre Økland (from (Norway) Kristiansund)
12	GK	NOR	Christoffer Gjertsen (promoted from junior squad)
13	MF	NOR	Martin Søreide (promoted from junior squad)
17	DF	NOR	Lars Ranger (on loan from (Norway) Lillestrøm)

Out: Note: Flags indicate national team as defined under FIFA eligibility rules; some limited exceptions apply. Players may hold more than one non-FIFA nationality.

No.	Pos.	Nation	Player
7	DF	NOR	Jan Tore Amundsen (retired)
8		NOR	Truls Jørstad (to (Norway) Hauerseter)
17		NOR	Karsten Rognerud (to (Norway) Hauerseter)
21	DF	FRA	Emmanuel Troudart (to (Norway) KFUM)
22	MF	NOR	Nicolay Solberg (to (Norway) Fredrikstad)
23	DF	NOR	Mats André Kaland (to (Norway) Strømmen)
24	FW	NOR	Lars-Jørgen Salvesen (to (Norway) Sarpsborg 08)
—	GK	NOR	Fredrik Johansen Mundal (released, previously on loan at (Norway) Skedsmo)
