= Sindre Mauritz-Hansen =

Norwegian footballer (born 1994)

Personal information
- Full name: Sindre Mauritz-Hansen
- Date of birth: 18 October 1994 (age 32)
- Place of birth: Asker, Norway
- Height: 1.82 m (6 ft 0 in)
- Positions: Forward; midfielder

Team information
- Current team: Union Carl Berner
- Number: 14

Youth career
- –2007: Holmen
- 2008–2011: Stabæk
- 2012–2013: Asker

Senior career*
| Years | Team | Apps | (Gls) |
| 2013–2016 | Asker | 69 | (64) |
| 2017–2019 | Stabæk | 4 | (0) |
| 2018 | → Strømmen (loan) | 25 | (17) |
| 2020 | Lillestrøm | 3 | (0) |
| 2020–2023 | Asker | 52 | (27) |
| 2024– | Union Carl Berner | 19 | (24) |

International career
| 2009 | Norway U15 | 2 | (0) |
- * Club domestic league appearances and goals as of 19 September 2025

Sindre Mauritz-Hansen (born 18 October 1994) is a Norwegian footballer who plays for Union Carl Berner.

== Career ==
=== Club ===
On 7 December 2016, Mauritz-Hansen signed a professional contract with Stabæk., where he previously played as a youth player, after scoring 68 goals in 74 appearances in all competitions for Asker.

He made his first appearance in Eliteserien on 17 April 2017 as an overtime substitute in a 3-0 victory against Sarpsborg 08. On 26 April 2017, Mauritz-Hansen scored a hat-trick in a 9-0 victory against Holmlia in the first round of the Norwegian Football Cup, which was his first official goals for Stabæk.

== Career statistics ==
=== Club ===
As of match played 29 October 2023

Appearances and goals by club, season and competition
| Club | Season | League | | | National Cup | | Other | | Total | |
| Club | Season | Division | Apps | Goals | Apps | Goals | Apps | Goals | Apps | Goals |
|---|---|---|---|---|---|---|---|---|---|---|
| Asker | 2013 | 2. divisjon | 7 | 2 | 0 | 0 | – | | 7 | 2 |
| Asker | 2014 | 2. divisjon | 21 | 7 | 1 | 0 | – | | 22 | 7 |
| Asker | 2015 | 3. divisjon | 24 | 37 | 2 | 1 | – | | 26 | 38 |
| Asker | 2016 | 2. divisjon | 17 | 18 | 2 | 2 | – | | 19 | 20 |
| Asker | Total | | 69 | 64 | 5 | 3 | - | - | 74 | 67 |
| Stabæk | 2017 | Eliteserien | 4 | 0 | 3 | 6 | – | | 7 | 6 |
| Stabæk | 2019 | Eliteserien | 0 | 0 | 0 | 0 | – | | 0 | 0 |
| Stabæk | Total | | 4 | 0 | 3 | 6 | - | - | 7 | 6 |
| Strømmen (loan) | 2018 | 1. divisjon | 25 | 17 | 2 | 1 | – | | 27 | 18 |
| Strømmen (loan) | Total | | 25 | 17 | 2 | 1 | - | - | 27 | 18 |
| Lillestrøm | 2020 | 1. divisjon | 3 | 0 | – | | – | | 3 | 0 |
| Lillestrøm | Total | | 3 | 0 | 0 | 0 | - | - | 3 | 0 |
| Asker | 2020 | 2. divisjon | 6 | 2 | 0 | 0 | 4 | 0 | 10 | 2 |
| Asker | 2021 | 2. divisjon | 17 | 7 | 1 | 1 | – | | 18 | 8 |
| Asker | 2022 | 2. divisjon | 23 | 15 | 1 | 0 | – | | 24 | 15 |
| Asker | 2023 | 2. divisjon | 6 | 3 | 1 | 0 | – | | 7 | 3 |
| Total | | | 52 | 27 | 3 | 1 | 4 | 0 | 59 | 28 |
| Career total | | | 153 | 108 | 13 | 11 | 4 | 0 | 170 | 119 |
