= Alexander Dang =

Norwegian football player (born 1990)

Personal information
- Date of birth: 12 February 1990 (age 36)
- Place of birth: Bergen, Norway
- Height: 1.85 m (6 ft 1 in)
- Position: Forward

Team information
- Current team: Lysekloster IL
- Number: 10

Youth career
- 2005–2007: Vadmyra
- 2008–2010: Hovding

Senior career*
Years	Team	Apps	(Gls)
2010–2014	Hovding	27	(27)
2014	Vadmyra	24	(29)
2015–2016	Sotra SK	51	(75)
2017–2019	Nest-Sotra Fotball	68	(38)
2019–2022	FK Jerv	19	(3)
2020–2021	→ Egersunds IK (loan)	20	(7)
2022	Øygarden FK	6	(0)
2022–	Lysekloster IL	92	(67)
- * Club domestic league appearances and goals as of 3 November 2025

Alexander Dang (born 12 February 1990) is a Norwegian footballer who plays as a forward for Lysekloster IL. Dang is known for his positioning and finishing inside the box.

== Career ==
Dang began his career with Vadmyra and Hovding before joining Sotra SK in 2015.

In the 2015 season, he scored 44 goals for Sotra and finished the season as the top scorer in the Norwegian Third Division.

After just over two years with Sotra, Dang signed for Norwegian Second Division club Nest-Sotra. He scored his first goal for the club in his first appearance, scoring the opener of a 1–1 draw against Egersunds on 14 April 2017. Dang finished the season with 21 league goals as Nest-Sotra was promoted to the 2018 Norwegian First Division.

== Personal life ==
Dang was born in Bergen, Norway to a Vietnamese father and Norwegian mother. His Vietnamese name is Đặng Xuân Trường.

== Honours ==
Individual

- Norwegian Third Division Top goalscorer: 2015
- Norwegian Second Division Top goalscorer: 2017
