= Marcus Mehnert =

Norwegian footballer (born 1997)

Personal information
- Full name: Marcus Johansen Mehnert
- Date of birth: 28 October 1997 (age 29)
- Place of birth: Asker, Norway
- Height: 1.84 m (6 ft 0 in)
- Position: Forward

Team information
- Current team: Strømsgodset
- Number: 77

Youth career
- Hvalstad
- –2010: Holmen
- 2011–2015: Stabæk

Senior career*
Years	Team	Apps	(Gls)
2016	Stabæk	2	(0)
2016–2018	Asker	58	(29)
2019–2021	Brann	7	(0)
2019	→ Nest-Sotra (loan)	21	(8)
2021–2022	Ranheim	58	(22)
2023–	Strømsgodset	104	(12)
- * Club domestic league appearances and goals as of 14 November 2026

Marcus Mehnert (born 28 October 1997) is a Norwegian footballer who plays as a striker for Eliteserien side Strømsgodset.

== Club career ==
He started his youth career in Hvalstad IL, then Holmen IF, but joined Stabæk in 2011. He progressed to the junior team and attended the Norwegian College of Elite Sports, attending the class of 2016 together with Andreas Hanche-Olsen, Cornelius Bencsik, Marius Østvold, Edvard Linnebo Race and Marie Dølvik Markussen among others.

He was drafted into the senior squad ahead of the 2016 season under new head coach Billy McKinlay, and made his league debut in March 2016 against Aalesund, starting the game. After half a season he went on to third-tier club Asker.

== Career statistics ==
=== Club ===
As of match played 14 November 2026

Appearances and goals by club, season and competition
Club	Season	League			National Cup		Europe		Total	
Club	Season	Division	Apps	Goals	Apps	Goals	Apps	Goals	Apps	Goals
Stabæk	2016	Tippeligaen	2	0	0	0	-		2	0
Stabæk	Total		2	0	0	0	-	-	2	0
Asker	2016	PostNord-ligaen	9	4	0	0	-		9	4
Asker	2017	PostNord-ligaen	25	10	2	2	-		27	12
Asker	2018	PostNord-ligaen	24	15	2	0	-		26	15
Asker	Total		58	29	4	2	-	-	62	31
Brann	2019	Eliteserien	0	0	0	0	-		0	0
Brann	2020	Eliteserien	7	0	0	0	-		7	0
Brann	Total		7	0	0	0	-	-	7	0
Nest-Sotra (loan)	2019	OBOS-ligaen	21	8	3	3	-		24	11
Nest-Sotra (loan)	Total		21	8	3	3	-	-	24	11
Ranheim	2021	OBOS-ligaen	29	10	3	0	-		32	10
Ranheim	2022	OBOS-ligaen	29	12	3	4	-		32	16
Ranheim	Total		58	22	6	4	-	-	64	26
Strømsgodset	2023	Eliteserien	29	4	4	1	-		33	5
Strømsgodset	2024	Eliteserien	25	0	4	4	-		29	4
Strømsgodset	2025	Eliteserien	20	1	2	1	-		22	2
Strømsgodset	2026	OBOS-ligaen	30	7	1	0	-		31	7
Strømsgodset	Total		104	12	11	6	-	-	115	18
Career total			250	71	24	15	-	-	274	86
