= Amani Mbedule =

Norwegian footballer (born 1996)

Personal information
- Full name: Amani Dickson Mbedule
- Date of birth: 19 September 1996 (age 30)
- Height: 1.77 m (5 ft 10 in)
- Position: Forward

Team information
- Current team: Türkiye Wilhelmsburg

Youth career
- –2013: Trosvik

Senior career*
Years	Team	Apps	(Gls)
2012–2015	Trosvik		
2015–2018	Sarpsborg 08	7	(0)
2017	→ Hødd (loan)	10	(1)
2017	→ Notodden (loan)	10	(3)
2018	→ Notodden (loan)	10	(0)
2019	Kråkerøy		
2019–2023	Lillehammer		
2022	→ Østsiden (loan)		
2023–	Türkiye Wilhelmsburg	8	(1)
2025–	FC St. Pauli Ⅲ	20	(21)
- * Club domestic league appearances and goals as of 17 May 2024

Amani Mbedule (born 19 September 1996) is a Norwegian football forward who plays for German fifth-tier Oberliga Hamburg club Türkiye Wilhelmsburg.

== Career ==
He made his debut for Trosvik IF in October 2012. In the 2014 Norwegian Third Division he scored 12 goals in 23 league games. In the summer of 2015 he was brought to larger neighbours Sarpsborg 08 FF, and made his Eliteserien debut playing two matches in November 2015. He was sent on loan to IL Hødd in the spring of 2017, to Notodden FK in the autumn of 2017 and then in entire 2018. In 2019 he moved on to Kråkerøy IL, only to register another transfer to Lillehammer FK in the autumn of 2019.

== Personal life ==
Born in Norway, Mbedule is of Tanzanian descent.
