= Idar Lysgård =

Norwegian footballer (born 1994)

Personal information
- Full name: Idar Nordby Lysgård
- Date of birth: 25 September 1994 (age 32)
- Height: 1.91 m (6 ft 3 in)
- Position: Goalkeeper

Team information
- Current team: Odd
- Number: 12

Youth career
- Ihle
- –2011: Raufoss

Senior career*
Years	Team	Apps	(Gls)
2012–2017	Skeid	120	(0)
2018	Kongsvinger	0	(0)
2018	→ Skeid (loan)	7	(0)
2019–2020	Skeid	45	(0)
2021	Mjøndalen	8	(0)
2022–2023	Åsane	58	(0)
2024	KFUM Oslo	0	(0)
2025	Vasalund	7	(0)
2026–	Odd	0	(0)
- * Club domestic league appearances and goals as of 2 September 2026

Idar Nordby Lysgård (born 25 September 1994) is a Norwegian professional footballer who plays as a goalkeeper for Odd.

He hails from Eina and played youth football for Ihle and Raufoss. In 2012 he got his senior debut for Skeid, first in the cup and then once in the league. The team was languishing on the fourth tier at the time, but advanced to the third, and Lysgård became the first-choice goalkeeper.

After the 2017 season he was picked up by Kongsvinger, but did not play and returned to Skeid, first on loan and then permanently. He played two more seasons with Skeid, being relegated from the second tier in 2019 and narrowly missing re-promotion through a playoff loss in 2020. In 2021 he joined first-tier club Mjøndalen. Benched during the 22 first games, he became the first choice after Mjøndalen's 0–7 loss to Haugesund.

Lysgård trained with IK Start during the 2023–24 transfer window. He did not join Start, but later signed for KFUM in the Eliteserien. He played two games in the 2024 cup.
