= Nicolai Geertsen =

Danish footballer (born 1991)

Personal information
- Full name: Nicolai Kornum Geertsen
- Date of birth: 19 June 1991 (age 35)
- Place of birth: Fredensborg, Denmark
- Height: 1.85 m (6 ft 1 in)
- Position: Centre-back

Youth career
- Fredensborg BI
- Lyngby
- 2009–2010: Brøndby

Senior career*
Years	Team	Apps	(Gls)
2010–2013	BSV		
2013–2014	HB Køge	17	(0)
2014	Egersund	11	(1)
2015–2017	Sandnes Ulf	79	(4)
2018	Hillerød	13	(8)
2018–2021	Lyngby	58	(6)
2021–2023	Helsingør	57	(5)
2023–2024	Hvidovre	10	(0)
Total		245	(24)
- * Club domestic league appearances and goals

Nicolai Kornum Geertsen (Danish pronunciation: [ˈke̝ɐ̯ˀtsn̩]; born 19 June 1991) is a Danish former professional footballer who played as a centre-back.

A versatile and opportunistic defender, Geertsen played at different levels in both Denmark and Norway. He captained Sandnes Ulf and Lyngby.

== Career ==
=== BSV ===
Geertsen signed with amateur club BK Søllerød Vedbæk (BSV) after moving from Brøndby IF's U19-team in August 2010. Before coming to Brøndby, he had risen through the ranks of the Lyngby Boldklub academy. Prior to signing with BSV, he had trialled in friendly matches during the summer, where he had left a good impression.

=== HB Køge ===
In August 2013, after three years at Søllerød-Vedbæk, Geertsen signed a six-month contract with HB Køge. He made his official debut for the club on 27 August as a starter in a 3–1 Danish Cup away win over Ledøje-Smørum, with Geertsen scoring the second goal for HB Køge. Geertsen was benched during the first four league matches of the regular season, but finally made his Danish second tier debut on 9 September as a 86th-minute substitute for Thobias Ndungu Skovgaard in a 2–1 loss to Hobro IK. He made a total of eight appearances during his first sixth months at HB Køge, and signed a six-month contract extension. During the spring season of 2014, Geertsen made nine league appearances. His contract was not extended after its expiration.

=== Egersunds IK ===
On 11 July 2014, Norwegian third tier club Egersunds IK announced that they had signed a contract with Geertsen after a successful trial. He played 11 matches and scored one goal during the 2014 season.

=== Sandnes Ulf ===
After his contract with the club expired, he had a trial with FC Helsingør, without this amounting to a contract offer. Instead, Geertsen continued his career in Norway, signing with Sandnes Ulf in January 2015, a club which had recently been relegated from the Eliteserien and therefore competed in the second tier. He made his official debut in the second round of the 2015 second tier season, starting in a 1–1 away draw against Ranheim IL.

In the summer of 2015, Geertsen signed a two-and-a-half-year contract extension, keeping him a part of Sandnes Ulf until December 2017. During his time for the club, he became a regular starter and eventually also club captain.

As his contract expired in December 2017, Geertsen declined a contract extension with Sandnes Ulf, citing a desire to return to Denmark. He made a total of 79 appearances scoring four goals during his three years at the club.

=== Hillerød ===
A free agent, Geertsen received a number of offers from clubs in Denmark and Norway, including Bodø/Glimt and Tromsø, but he also had a trial at Nykøbing FC, who he ended up not signing with due to its long distance to Copenhagen. In March 2018, he signed with Danish third tier club Hillerød, making his first start only days after joining, in a 2–2 away draw against VSK Aarhus.

=== Lyngby ===
Geertsen signed a contract with Lyngby Boldklub from the second-tier 1st Division in July 2018 after having trained with their first team, marking a return to the club from his youth. He made his debut in the first round of competition on 29 July, starting in the centre of defense in a 1–1 home draw against Hvidovre IF. Geertsen reached promotion to the Danish Superliga during his first season at the club, in which he made 16 total appearances scoring three goals. During Martin Ørnskov's absence due to a concussion, Geertsen has emerged as club captain.

On 12 November 2020, Geertsen scored a scissor kick where his first attempt clanged off the crossbar and bounced right back to him, then he struck the ball with a second scissor kick, this one squeezing between the goalkeeper's outstretched arms and a defender standing on the goal line. The goal became viral.

=== Helsingør ===
On 22 January 2021, Geertsen signed a one-and-a-half-year deal with 1st Division club FC Helsingør. He made his debut on 12 February in a 2–0 away win over Kolding IF, also scoring his first goal for the club to secure the final score in the 65th minute.

=== Hvidovre ===
On 19 June 2023, Geertsen joined newly promoted Danish Superliga club Hvidovre on a two-year deal. He announced his retirement from football on 16 January 2024, citing persistent injuries.
