= Niels Vorthoren =

Dutch footballer (born 1988)

Personal information
- Full name: Niels Vorthoren
- Date of birth: 21 February 1988 (age 38)
- Place of birth: Gorinchem, Netherlands
- Height: 1.88 m (6 ft 2 in)
- Position: Midfielder

Team information
- Current team: Barendrecht
- Number: 6

Youth career
- Kozakken Boys

Senior career*
Years	Team	Apps	(Gls)
2007–2009	Willem II	32	(1)
2009–2011	Den Bosch	64	(13)
2011–2013	Excelsior	47	(3)
2013–2014	Capelle	12	(0)
2014–2015	MVV	35	(3)
2015–2016	BK Häcken	7	(0)
2017	Start	27	(9)
2018	Sandnes Ulf	28	(3)
2019–	Barendrecht	110	(26)

International career
2005	Netherlands U17	12	(2)
2006	Netherlands U18	1	(0)
2007	Netherlands U19	4	(0)
Medal record
Men's football
Representing Netherlands
UEFA European Under-17 Championship
Runner-up	2005
- * Club domestic league appearances and goals as of 19:28, 15 March 2024 (UTC)

Niels Vorthoren (born 21 February 1988) is a Dutch footballer who plays as a midfielder for BVV Barendrecht.

Vorthoren has played for the Netherlands and U17, U18 and U19 levels, appearing at both the 2005 UEFA European Under-17 Championship and 2005 FIFA U-17 World Championship.

== Club career ==
Vorthoren made his debut in the Eredivisie for Willem II in the away-match against Feyenoord (0–2 loss) on 1 September 2007. In the home match against NEC Nijmegen (3–0 win) he appeared in the starting line-up for the first time. He finished the season having played 19 Eredivisie games. The following season he played less, due to an injury. Although there had been rumours Vorthoren would play for K.S.V. Roeselare (on loan) for the rest of the season, he stayed with Willem II. He moved to FC Den Bosch at the start of the 2009–10 Eredivisie season. The season 2017 he will play for Norwegian Start in OBOS-ligaen.

Vorthoren left Sandnes Ulf at the end of 2018. On 12 April 2019, it was announced that Vorthoren would join BVV Barendrecht from the 2019–20 season. He signed a one-year contract extension with the club in January 2020.

== International career ==
Vorthoren gained 13 caps for the Netherlands under-17 team, in which he scored two goals. He was part of the team competing at the 2005 UEFA European Under-17 Championship and 2005 FIFA U-17 World Championship. He also made four appearances for the under-19 team.
