= Jonas Rønningen =

Norwegian footballer (born 1990)

Personal information
- Full name: Jonas Kippersund Rønningen
- Date of birth: 27 November 1990 (age 35)
- Place of birth: Hjelset, Norway
- Height: 1.81 m (5 ft 11 in)
- Position: Right winger

Team information
- Current team: Hjelset-Kleive

Youth career
- Molde

Senior career*
Years	Team	Apps	(Gls)
2012–2013	Træff	51	(18)
2014–2018	Kristiansund	100	(9)
2019–2020	Kongsvinger	20	(1)
2025–	Hjelset-Kleive		
- * Club domestic league appearances and goals as of 1 January 2025

Jonas Kippersund Rønningen (born 27 November 1990) is a Norwegian footballer.

== Career ==
On 3 January 2019 it was announced that Kristiansund BK would not extend Rønningen's expiring contract.

== Career statistics ==
As of 4 November 2019

Season	Club	Division	League		Cup		Total	
Season	Club	Division	Apps	Goals	Apps	Goals	Apps	Goals
2012	Træff	2. divisjon	25	11	1	0	26	11
2013	Træff	2. divisjon	26	7	2	0	28	7
2014	Kristiansund	1. divisjon	18	0	2	0	20	0
2015	Kristiansund	1. divisjon	19	3	4	0	23	3
2016	Kristiansund	1. divisjon	29	4	1	0	30	4
2017	Kristiansund	Eliteserien	28	2	4	2	32	4
2018	Kristiansund	Eliteserien	4	0	0	0	4	0
2019	Kongsvinger	1. divisjon	12	0	0	0	12	0
Career Total			161	26	14	2	185	28
