= Kråkerøy IL =

Norwegian football club

- Full name: Kråkerøy Idrettslag
- Founded: 25 February 1937
- Ground: Kråkerøy stadion, Kråkerøy
- League: Fourth Division
- 2024: 4th

Kråkerøy Idrettslag is a Norwegian multi-sports club from Kråkerøy, Fredrikstad. It has sections for association football and team handball.

Kråkerøy IL was founded on 25 February 1937. Most of the sports that were practised from the start, were later discontinued in the club, namely athletics, orienteering and Nordic skiing. The club among others operated its own ski jumping hill with electric lighting. The clubroom was opened in 1984 and the artificial turf in 2009. The team colours are white and green.

The men's football team plays in the Fourth Division, the fifth tier of Norwegian football. In modern times, the team experienced a single Third Division season in 1995, before a longer spell from 2013 to 2021.

For many years, the club was best known for its run in the 1974 Norwegian Football Cup, where they eliminated Sandefjord BK in the first round followed by beating the first-tier team Vålerengens IF in the second round. During their long spell in the Third Division, Kråkerøy reached the Cup in every year except 2014 (and 2020, when the cup was cancelled). Most notably, the team eliminated Fredrikstad FK from the 2017 cup, winning 1–0 in the first round. Pitted against Vålerenga in the second round, it ended in a draw, whereupon Kråkerøy lost on penalty shootout. The other cup runs all ended in the first round:

- 2013: 1–6 against Fredrikstad
- 2015: 0–4 against Sarpsborg 08
- 2016: 0–2 against KFUM
- 2018: 0–4 against Moss
- 2019: 2–6 against Grorud
- 2021: 0–3 against Fredrikstad

Within team handball, Kråkerøy IL was the childhood club of Norwegian international Anette Hovind Johansen.
