= Emil Sildnes =

Norwegian footballer (born 1993)

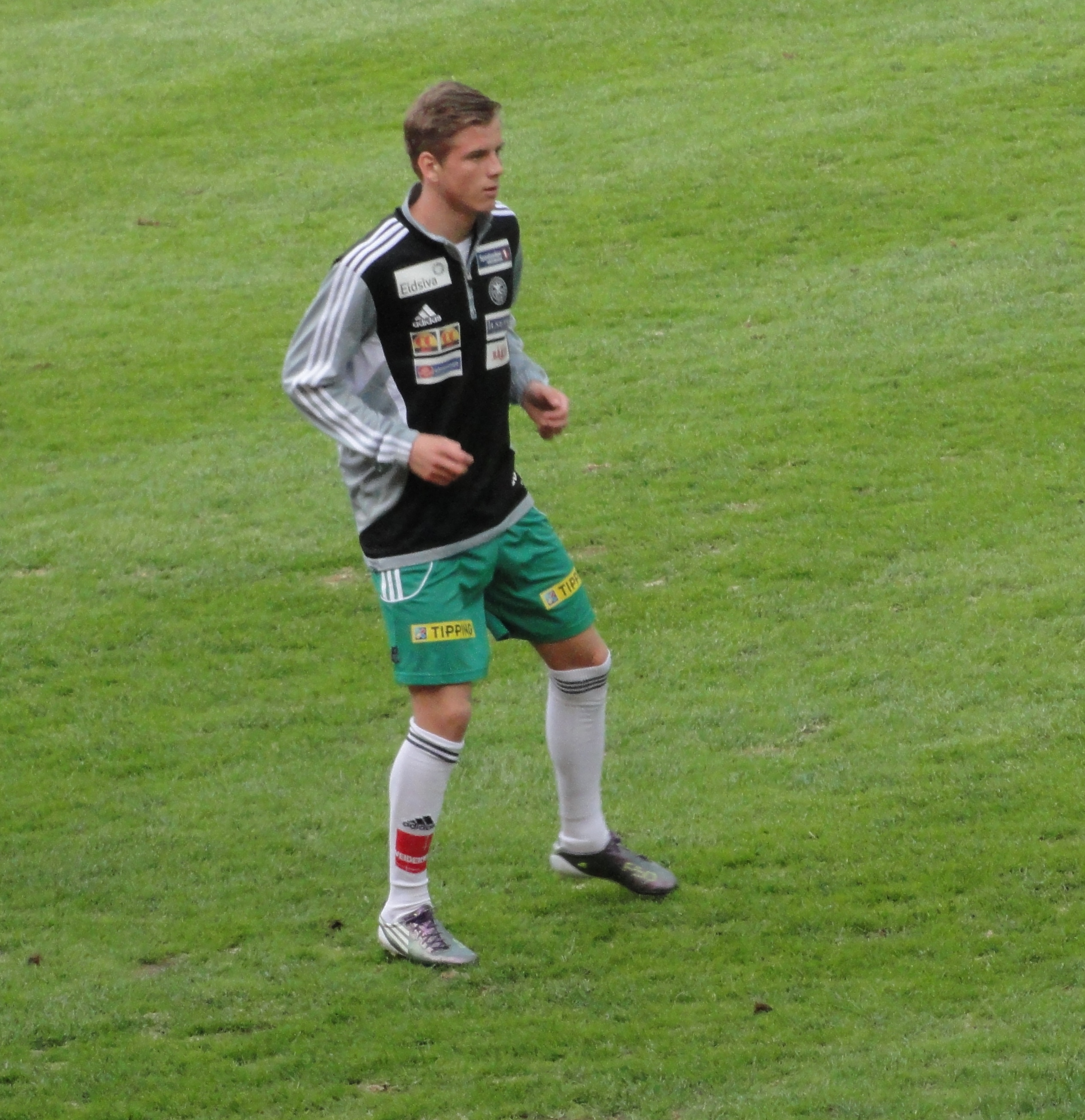
- Sildnes with Hamkam in 2011

Personal information
- Date of birth: 29 January 1993 (age 33)
- Place of birth: Hamar, Norway
- Height: 1.81 m (5 ft 11 in)
- Position: Midfielder

Team information
- Current team: Raufoss
- Number: 7

Senior career*
Years	Team	Apps	(Gls)
2009–2014	HamKam	57	(3)
2016	Oppsal	25	(5)
2017–2018	Strømmen	53	(9)
2019–2023	HamKam	89	(11)
2023–2026	Åsane Fotball	72	(8)
2026–	Raufoss	23	(1)

International career
2009	Norway U16	6	(3)
2010	Norway U17	7	(0)
2012	Norway U19	1	(0)
- * Club domestic league appearances and goals as of 14 November 2026

Emil Sildnes (born 29 January 1993) is a Norwegian footballer who plays as a midfielder for Norwegian First Division club Raufoss.

== Career ==
Sildnes started his senior career with HamKam in 2009. In the opening round of the 2014 season, he broke his leg. He returned to football with Oppsal in 2016, before moving to Strømmen in 2017. After two seasons with Strømmen, he returned to HamKam in 2019. On 2 April 2022, he made his Eliteserien debut in a 2–2 draw against Lillestrøm.
