= Adrià Mateo =

Spanish footballer

Personal information
- Full name: Adrià Mateo López
- Date of birth: 16 March 1995 (age 31)
- Place of birth: Spain
- Position: Midfielder

Youth career
- –2014: Damm

Senior career*
Years	Team	Apps	(Gls)
2014–2018	Levanger	119	(9)
2019–2021	Ranheim	54	(3)
- * Club domestic league appearances and goals as of 30 October 2021

Adrià Mateo López (born 16 March 1995), is a Spanish former footballer.

On 29 October 2021 he scored from 71 metres in a First Division match against Raufoss.

== Career statistics ==
=== Club ===
As of match played 7 November 2021

Appearances and goals by club, season and competition
Club	Season	League			National Cup		Continental		Total	
Club	Season	Division	Apps	Goals	Apps	Goals	Apps	Goals	Apps	Goals
Levanger	2014	2. divisjon	11	2	0	0	-		11	2
Levanger	2015	1. divisjon	27	5	2	0	-		29	5
Levanger	2016	1. divisjon	23	0	2	0	-		25	0
Levanger	2017	1. divisjon	29	1	3	1	-		32	2
Levanger	2018	1. divisjon	29	1	3	1	-		32	2
Levanger	Total		119	9	10	2	-	-	129	11
Ranheim	2019	Eliteserien	13	2	2	0	-		15	2
Ranheim	2020	1. divisjon	18	0	0	0	-		18	0
Ranheim	2021	1. divisjon	23	1	1	0	-		24	1
Ranheim	Total		54	3	3	0	-	-	57	3
Career total			173	12	13	2	-	-	186	14
