= Lysekloster IL =

Norwegian sports club

- Full name: Lysekloster Idrettslag
- Founded: 30 May 1946; 80 years ago
- Ground: Lysekloster Family Arena
- League: 2. divisjon
- 2024: 2.. divisjon – Group 1, 5th of 14
- Website: https://www.lysekloster.no/

Lysekloster Idrettslag is a Norwegian multi-sports club from Lysefjorden in Bjørnafjorden Municipality, Vestland. It has sections for association football, handball and athletics.

The men's football team plays in the 2. divisjon, after winning promotion from the 3. divisjon in 2023.

== Players ==
=== Current squad ===
As of 23 July 2026

Note: Flags indicate national team as defined under FIFA eligibility rules; some limited exceptions apply. Players may hold more than one non-FIFA nationality.

No.	Pos.	Nation	Player
1	GK	NOR	Daniel Gjerde Sætren (on loan from Sogndal)
2	DF	NOR	Johannes Konstali-Lødemel
3	DF	NOR	Einar Jølle
4	DF	NOR	Marius Mattingsdal
5	MF	NOR	Jacob Valland
6	DF	NOR	Trym Vatn Øvreberg
7	DF	NOR	Tommy Rivaldo Svendsen
8	MF	NOR	Marius Årøy (on loan from Sogndal)
9	DF	TUR	Fabian Røed Özyilmaz

No.	Pos.	Nation	Player
11	MF	NOR	Ola Olsen (on loan from Hødd)
14	MF	NOR	Kristian Kongelf (on loan from Sogndal)
17	MF	NOR	Vebjørn Nakken
18	DF	NOR	Jørgen Lunde
19	FW	NOR	Kriss Bonabandi
23	MF	NOR	Lloyd Adrian Dahle Fagerlie
30	DF	NOR	Jonas Vågen
33	FW	NOR	Viljar Stavø (on loan from Sogndal)

=== Out on loan ===
Note: Flags indicate national team as defined under FIFA eligibility rules; some limited exceptions apply. Players may hold more than one non-FIFA nationality.

No. / Pos. / Nation / Player	No. / Pos. / Nation / Player
