= Holmen IF =

Norwegian sports club

Home colours

Holmen Idrettsforening is a Norwegian sports club from Holmen in northern Asker, Norway. It has sections for football, handball, and cross-country skiing. Its home ground is Holmen idrettspark.

The club was founded in 1918, at that time having sections for football, athletics and ski jumping. More sports were later added to the club, notably ice hockey as Holmen IF was one of the founding members of the Norwegian Ice Hockey Federation in 1934, as well as tennis. Another local sports club Hvalstad IF was merged into Holmen IF some time after 1945. In 1997 the tennis section broke away to form Holmen TK, and the same thing happened to the ice hockey section in 1998.
