= 2015 Lillestrøm SK season =

Lillestrøm
2015 season
- Chairman: Øystein Neerland
- Manager: Magnus Haglund
- Stadium: Åråsen Stadion
- Tippeligaen: 8th
- Norwegian Cup: Third Round vs Strømmen
- Top goalscorer: League: Fred Friday (11); All: Fred Friday (17)

The 2015 season is Lillestrøm's 39th consecutive year in Tippeligaen and their first with Rúnar Kristinsson as manager.

== Squad ==
As of 14 August 2015

Note: Flags indicate national team as defined under FIFA eligibility rules; some limited exceptions apply. Players may hold more than one non-FIFA nationality.

No.	Pos.	Nation	Player
2	DF	NED	Michael Timisela
3	DF	NOR	Simen Kind Mikalsen
4	DF	NOR	Marius Amundsen
5	DF	FIN	Lum Rexhepi
6	MF	ISL	Finnur Orri Margeirsson
7	MF	SWE	Johan Andersson
8	MF	FRA	Malaury Martin
9	FW	ISL	Árni Vilhjálmsson
10	MF	NOR	Marius Lundemo
11	FW	NOR	Erling Knudtzon
12	GK	NOR	Jacob Faye-Lund
13	DF	NOR	Frode Kippe (captain)

No.	Pos.	Nation	Player
14	MF	NOR	Fredrik Krogstad
16	DF	NOR	Håkon Skogseid
17	MF	NOR	Jørgen Kolstad
18	MF	NGR	Bonke Innocent
19	FW	NOR	Joachim Osvold
20	DF	NOR	Stian Ringstad
22	DF	NOR	Simen Nordermoen
23	FW	NGR	Fred Friday
27	MF	NOR	Markus Brændsrød
29	GK	NOR	Emil Ødegaard
30	FW	NOR	Mohamed Ofkir
77	GK	KEN	Arnold Origi

== Transfers ==
=== Winter ===
In: Note: Flags indicate national team as defined under FIFA eligibility rules; some limited exceptions apply. Players may hold more than one non-FIFA nationality.

No.	Pos.	Nation	Player
1	GK	NOR	Kenneth Udjus (loan return from (Norway) Sogndal)
5	DF	FIN	Lum Rexhepi (from (Finland) FC Honka)
6	MF	ISL	Finnur Ori Margeirsson (from (Iceland) Breiðablik UBK)
9	FW	ISL	Árni Vilhjálmsson (from (Iceland) Breiðablik UBK)
14	MF	NOR	Fredrik Krogstad (from (Norway) Lørenskog)
19	FW	NOR	Joachim Osvold (loan return from (Finland) TPS)
27	MF	NOR	Markus Brændsrød (from (Norway) Vålerenga)

Out: Note: Flags indicate national team as defined under FIFA eligibility rules; some limited exceptions apply. Players may hold more than one non-FIFA nationality.

No.	Pos.	Nation	Player
1	GK	NOR	Kenneth Udjus (to (Norway) Brann)
10	MF	NOR	Petter Vaagan Moen (to (Norway) Strømsgodset)
14	MF	ISL	Pálmi Rafn Pálmason (to (Iceland) KR)
16	MF	NOR	Ohi Omoijuanfo (to (Norway) Jerv)
17	MF	NOR	Erik Mjelde (to (Norway) Sandefjord)

=== Summer ===
In: Note: Flags indicate national team as defined under FIFA eligibility rules; some limited exceptions apply. Players may hold more than one non-FIFA nationality.

No.	Pos.	Nation	Player
2	DF	NED	Michael Timisela (free agent)
8	MF	FRA	Malaury Martin (from (Norway) Sandnes Ulf)
16	DF	NOR	Håkon Skogseid (free agent)

Out: Note: Flags indicate national team as defined under FIFA eligibility rules; some limited exceptions apply. Players may hold more than one non-FIFA nationality.

No.	Pos.	Nation	Player
8	MF	NOR	Bjørn Helge Riise (to (Norway) Aalesund)
21	FW	CIV	Moryké Fofana (to (France) Lorient)
90	FW	NOR	Amahl Pellegrino (to (Norway) Mjøndalen)

== Competitions ==
=== Tippeligaen ===
==== Results summary ====
Overall								Home						Away					
Pld	W	D	L	GF	GA	GD	Pts	W	D	L	GF	GA	GD	W	D	L	GF	GA	GD
30	12	9	9	45	43	+2	45	9	3	3	26	18	+8	3	6	6	19	25	−6

==== Results by round ====
Round	1	2	3	4	5	6	7	8	9	10	11	12	13	14	15	16	17	18	19	20	21	22	23	24	25	26	27	28	29	30
Ground	H	A	A	H	A	H	A	H	A	H	A	H	A	H	A	H	A	H	H	A	H	A	H	A	H	A	H	A	H	A
Result	D	D	D	L	W	D	L	W	W	W	L	W	D	D	D	L	L	W	W	L	W	D	W	D	W	L	W	W	W	L
Position	8	10	11	13	10	11	13	10	8	8	8	7	8	8	8	8	9	9	9	10	9	9	9	9	9	9	8	8	8	8

Updated to match(es) played on 8 November 2015. Source: see below
A = Away; H = Home; W = Win; D = Draw; L = Loss

==== Fixtures ====
7 April 2015 1	Lillestrøm	1–1	Start	Lillestrøm
19:00 CEST (UTC+2)	Kippe (red card) 47'; Fofana (yellow card) 58'; Mikalsen 90+4'	Summary	Børufsen 11' (yellow card) 90+5'; Dahle (yellow card) 55'; Sandnes (yellow card) 63'	Stadium: Åråsen Stadion; Attendance: 4,961; Referee: Dag Vidar Hafsås

12 April 2015 2	Aalesund	1–1	Lillestrøm	Ålesund
15:30 CEST (UTC+2)	Barrantes (yellow card) 29'; Larsen 89'	Summary	Knudtzon 50'; Fofana (yellow card) 56'	Stadium: Color Line Stadion; Attendance: 7,365; Referee: Espen Berntsen

19 April 2015 3	Tromsø	1–1	Lillestrøm	Tromsø
18:00 CEST (UTC+2)	Andersen (yellow card) 33'; Åsen 35'; Hansson (yellow card) 90+1'	Summary	Knudtzon 34'	Stadium: Alfheim Stadion; Attendance: 3,229; Referee: Brage Sandmoen

26 April 2015 4	Lillestrøm	0–2	Stabæk	Lillestrøm
18:00 CEST (UTC+2)	Kippe (yellow card) 35'	Summary	Issah (yellow card) 12' (goal) 45+1'; Asante 45'; Meling (yellow card) 90+1'	Stadium: Åråsen Stadion; Attendance: 4,881; Referee: Svein Erik Edvartsen

30 April 2015 5	Mjøndalen	1–4	Lillestrøm	Mjøndalen
20:00 CEST (UTC+2)	M.Olsen 10'	Summary	Friday 39', 49', 60'; Fofana 68'; Pellegrino (yellow card) 87'	Stadium: Isachsen Stadion; Attendance: 3,150; Referee: Anders Johansen

3 May 2015 6	Lillestrøm	1–1	Vålerenga	Lillestrøm
18:00 CEST (UTC+2)	Margerisson (yellow card) 42'; Fofana (yellow card) 65'; Andersson 68' (pen.)	Summary	Holm 22'; Brown (yellow card) 51'	Stadium: Åråsen stadion Attendance: 9,071; Referee: Ken Henry Johnsen

9 May 2015 7	Rosenborg	3–0	Lillestrøm	Trondheim
18:00 CEST (UTC+2)	Søderlund 13', 20'; Helland 34'	Summary	Kolstad (yellow card) 57'; Riise (yellow card) 66'; Krogstad (yellow card) 75'; Margerisson (yellow card) 82'; Innocent (yellow card) 90+4'	Stadium: Lerkendal Stadion; Attendance: 16,757; Referee: Tore Hansen

13 May 2015 8	Lillestrøm	2–1	Molde	Lillestrøm
18:00 CEST (UTC+2)	Knudtzon 60', 63'	Summary	Toivio 7' (yellow card) 78'	Stadium: Åråsen Stadion; Attendance: 7,259; Referee: Svein Oddvar Moen

16 May 2015 9	Sarpsborg 08	1–3	Lillestrøm	Sarpsborg
18:00 CEST (UTC+2)	Trondsen (yellow card) 37' (goal) 90+4'	Summary	Ernemann 19' (o.g.); Andersson (yellow card) 39' (goal) 50'; Krogstad 90+2'	Stadium: Sarpsborg Stadion; Attendance: 4,933; Referee: Svein Erik Edvartsen

25 May 2015 10	Lillestrøm	3–0	Bodø/Glimt	Lillestrøm
15:30 CEST (UTC+2)	Knudtzon 15'; Mikalsen (yellow card) 36'; Kolstad 41'; Fofana 87'	Summary	Sané (yellow card) 56'; Olsen (yellow card) 30'	Stadium: Åråsen Stadion; Attendance: 5,003; Referee: Martin Lundby

31 May 2015 11	Strømsgodset	2–0	Lillestrøm	Drammen
15:30 CEST (UTC+2)	Wikheim 49'; Fossum 85'	Summary	Innocent (yellow card) 23' (yellow-red card) 83'; Amundsen (yellow card) 67'; Knudtzon (yellow card) 78'; Fofana (yellow card) 87'	Stadium: Marienlyst Stadion; Attendance: 6,610; Referee: Svein Oddvar Moen

7 June 2015 12	Lillestrøm	2–1	Viking	Lillestrøm
20:00 CEST (UTC+2)	Fofana 38'; Knudtzon 45+1'; Pellegrino (yellow card) 69'	Summary	Berisha 59'; Danielsen (yellow card) 70'	Stadium: Åråsen Stadion; Attendance: 4,938; Referee: Ola Hobber Nilsen

20 June 2015 13	Sandefjord	0–0	Lillestrøm	Sandefjord
15:30 CEST (UTC+2)		Summary	Kippe (yellow card) 26'; Riise (yellow card) 73'	Stadium: Komplett.no Arena; Attendance: 3,635; Referee: Svein Oddvar Moen

28 June 2015 14	Lillestrøm	1–1	Odd	Lillestrøm
18:00 CEST (UTC+2)	Kippe (yellow card) 25'; Fofana 52' (pen.); Margeirsson (yellow card) 85'; Innocent (yellow card) 90'	Summary	Occéan 36'	Stadium: Åråsen Stadion; Attendance: 4,696; Referee: Trygve Kjensli

4 July 2015 15	Haugesund	3–3	Lillestrøm	Haugesund
18:00 CEST (UTC+2)	Gytkjær 13' (pen.), 23', 90+1'	Summary	Knudtzon 11'; Riise (yellow card) 12'; Fofana 55', 86'	Stadium: Haugesund Stadion; Attendance: 5,273; Referee: Kai Erik Steen

12 July 2015 16	Lillestrøm	1–2	Strømsgodset	Lillestrøm
20:00 CEST (UTC+2)	Fofana 57' (pen.); Lundemo (yellow card) 80'; Origi (yellow card) 90+3'	Summary	Abu (yellow card) 37'; Kastrati 52' (yellow card) 78'; Wikheim 85'	Stadium: Åråsen Stadion; Attendance: 4,472; Referee: Tom Harald Hagen

27 July 2015 17	Vålerenga	2–0	Lillestrøm	Oslo
19:00 CEST (UTC+2)	Mathisen 50' (pen.); Amundsen 65' (o.g.)	Summary	Lundemo (yellow card) 39'; Amundsen (yellow card) 79'; Kippe (yellow card) 81'	Stadium: Ullevaal stadion Attendance: 15,661; Referee: Svein Oddvar Moen

2 August 2015 18	Lillestrøm	3–2	Sandefjord	Kjeller
18:00 CEST (UTC+2)	Kippe 3' (yellow card) 86'; Knudtzon 29'; Friday 33'; Pellegrino (yellow card) 90'	Summary	Hansen (yellow card) 18'; Amundsen 41' (o.g.); Kirkevold 67'	Stadium: Åråsen Stadion; Attendance: 3,881; Referee: Ola Nilsen

9 August 2015 19	Lillestrøm	0–5	Rosenborg	Kjeller
18:00 CEST (UTC+2)	Innocent (yellow card) 27'; Martin (yellow card) 33'; Mikalsen (red card) 81'	Summary	Helland 39'; Bjørdal 44' 74'; Søderlund 78' (pen.), 82' (pen.)	Stadium: Åråsen Stadion; Attendance: 8,406; Referee: Svein Edvartsen

16 August 2015 20	Stabæk	3–2	Lillestrøm	Bærum
20:00 CEST (UTC+2)	Diomande 50', 88'; Gorozia (yellow card) 66'; Næss 86'	Summary	Friday 15'; Kolstad 30'; Ringstad (yellow card) 53'; Knudtzon (yellow card) 79'	Stadium: Nadderud Stadion; Attendance: 3,610; Referee: Svein Oddvar Moen

21 August 2015 21	Lillestrøm	1–0	Tromsø	Lillestrøm
19:00 CEST (UTC+2)	Martin 55'	Summary	Ødegaard (yellow card) 86'	Stadium: Åråsen Stadion; Attendance: 5,550; Referee: Tommy Skjerven

30 August 2015 22	Molde	2–2	Lillestrøm	Molde
15:30 CEST (UTC+2)	Simonsen (yellow card) 23'; Høiland 54'; Moström 81'	Summary	Innocent (yellow card) 10'; Timisela (yellow card) 17'; Martin 24'; Kolstad (yellow card) 28'; Friday (yellow card) 77' (goal) 86'	Stadium: Aker Stadion; Attendance: 8,318; Referee: Kai Erik Steen

13 September 2015 23	Lillestrøm	3–1	Aalesund	Lillestrøm
18:00 CEST (UTC+2)	Lundemo 11'; Jørgen Kolstad 43'; Friday 47'	Summary	Riise (yellow card) 37'; Latifu (yellow card) 77'; James 89' (pen.)	Stadium: Åråsen Stadion; Attendance: 5,353; Referee: Svein Oddvar Moen

19 September 2015 24	Start	0–0	Lillestrøm	Kristiansand
15:30 CEST (UTC+2)		Summary	Margeirsson (yellow card) 80'	Stadium: Sør Arena; Attendance: 5,354; Referee: Tom Harald Hagen

26 September 2015 25	Lillestrøm	3–0	Mjøndalen	Lillestrøm
15:30 CEST (UTC+2)	Friday 9'; Kolstad (yellow card) 40'; Knudtzon 70'; Martin 88'	Summary		Stadium: Åråsen Stadion; Attendance: 4,306; Referee: Kim Andre Johnsen

4 October 2015 26	Viking	1–0	Lillestrøm	Stavanger
18:00 CEST (UTC+2)	Þorsteinsson 23'	Summary	Origi (yellow card) 23'	Stadium: Viking Stadion; Attendance: 10,023; Referee: Trygve Kjensli

18 October 2015 27	Lillestrøm	2–0	Haugesund	Lillestrøm
18:00 CEST (UTC+2)	Skjerve 17' (o.g.); Vilhjálmsson 19'	Summary	Kiss (yellow card) 42'; Bjørnbak (yellow card) 65'	Stadium: Åråsen Stadion; Attendance: 4,051; Referee: Martin Lundby

25 October 2015 28	Bodø/Glimt	0–3	Lillestrøm	Bodø
18:00 CET (UTC+1)	Jacobsen (yellow card) 48'; Moe (red card) 75'; Furebotn (yellow card) 76'; Saltnes (yellow card) 80'	Summary	Vilhjálmsson 32' (yellow card) 76'; Martin (yellow card) 76'; Friday 77', 90'	Stadium: Aspmyra stadion Attendance: 2,625; Referee: Omar Rafiq

1 November 2015 29	Lillestrøm	3–1	Sarpsborg 08	Lillestrøm
18:00 CET (UTC+1)	Friday 49'; Margeirsson (yellow card) 58'; Mikalsen 74'; Knudtzon 90+1'	Summary	Zajić 90+3' (pen.)	Stadium: Åråsen Stadion; Attendance: 6,085; Referee: Espen Eskås

8 November 2015 30	Odd	5–0	Lillestrøm	Skien
18:00 CET (UTC+1)	Bentley 16'; Occéan 54'; Nordkvelle 57', 81', 88'	Summary	Amundsen (yellow card) 35'	Stadium: Skagerak Arena; Attendance: 8,457; Referee: Trygve Kjensli

==== Table ====
Pos	Team	Pld	W	D	L	GF	GA	GD	Pts
6	Molde	30	15	7	8	62	31	+31	52
7	Vålerenga	30	14	7	9	49	41	+8	49
8	Lillestrøm (Note: Lillestrøm started the season with a one point deduction due to poor financial reporting.)	30	12	9	9	45	43	+2	44
9	Bodø/Glimt	30	12	4	14	53	56	−3	40
10	Aalesund	30	11	5	14	42	57	−15	38

Source: Football Association of Norway (in Norwegian), Soccerway
Rules for classification: 1) Points; 2) Goal difference; 3) Goals scored; 4) Head-to-head points; 5) Head-to-head goal difference; 6) Head-to-head away goals scored (between two teams).

=== Norwegian Cup ===
22 April 2015 First Round	Rælingen	3–9	Lillestrøm	Rælingen
18:00 CEST (UTC+2)	A.Wilhelmsen (yellow card) 22'; S.Krolikowski 38'; C.Lamptey 58'; A.A.Tjernsli 83'	Summary	Friday 19', 40', 61', 75'; Osvold 41'; Fofana 56'; Pellegrino 73', 89'; Sinyan (yellow card) 78'; Krogstad 88'	Stadium: Marikollen kunstgress Attendance: 2,314; Referee: Anders Hauglund

6 May 2015 Second Round	Eidsvold	0–3	Lillestrøm	Eidsvoll
18:00 CET (UTC+2)		Report	Friday 40', 86'; Pellegrino 88'	Stadium: Myhrer stadion Attendance: 749; Referee: Anders Gjermshus

3 June 2015 Third Round	Strømmen	2–1 (a.e.t.)	Lillestrøm	Strømmen
18:00 CET (UTC+2)	Andresen (yellow card) 45+1'; Hansen 90', 120'; K.Jahr (yellow card) 109'	Report	Fofana 78'	Stadium: Strømmen Stadion; Attendance: 1,850; Referee: Trond Ivar Døvle

== Squad statistics ==
As of match played 8 November 2015

=== Appearances and goals ===
No.	Pos	Nat	Player	Total		Tippeligaen		Norwegian Cup	
No.	Pos	Nat	Player	Apps	Goals	Apps	Goals	Apps	Goals
2	DF	(Netherlands) NED	Michael Timisela	11	0	10+1	0	0	0
3	DF	(Norway) NOR	Simen Kind Mikalsen	30	2	20+7	2	3	0
4	DF	(Norway) NOR	Marius Amundsen	33	0	30	0	3	0
6	MF	(Iceland) ISL	Finnur Orri Margeirsson	30	0	21+6	0	3	0
7	MF	(Sweden) SWE	Johan Andersson	13	2	12	2	1	0
8	MF	(France) FRA	Malaury Martin	11	3	11	3	0	0
9	FW	(Iceland) ISL	Árni Vilhjálmsson	14	2	8+6	2	0	0
10	MF	(Norway) NOR	Marius Lundemo	15	1	14+1	1	0	0
11	MF	(Norway) NOR	Erling Knudtzon	31	10	29	10	1+1	0
12	GK	(Norway) NOR	Jacob Faye-Lund	1	0	0	0	1	0
13	DF	(Norway) NOR	Frode Kippe	24	1	24	1	0	0
14	MF	(Norway) NOR	Fredrik Krogstad	13	2	2+9	1	2	1
16	DF	(Norway) NOR	Håkon Skogseid	7	0	6+1	0	0	0
17	MF	(Norway) NOR	Jørgen Kolstad	28	3	16+9	3	3	0
18	MF	(Nigeria) NGR	Bonke Innocent	22	0	16+4	0	2	0
19	FW	(Norway) NOR	Joachim Osvold	2	1	0+1	0	1	1
20	DF	(Norway) NOR	Stian Ringstad	23	0	18+2	0	3	0
22	DF	(Norway) NOR	Simen Nordermoen	1	0	0	0	0+1	0
23	FW	(Nigeria) NGR	Fred Friday	29	17	18+8	11	2+1	6
27	MF	(Norway) NOR	Markus Brændsrød	6	0	0+5	0	0+1	0
30	FW	(Norway) NOR	Mohamed Ofkir	12	0	11+1	0	0	0
31	FW	(Norway) NOR	Sheriff Sinyan	2	0	0	0	0+2	0
32	DF	(Norway) NOR	Sondre Karterud	1	0	0	0	0+1	0
34	DF	(Norway) NOR	Peder Kristiansen	2	0	0	0	0+2	0
35	MF	(Norway) NOR	Henrik Kristiansen	1	0	0+1	0	0	0
37	FW	(Norway) NOR	Petter Mathias Olsen	1	0	0+1	0	0	0
77	GK	(Kenya) KEN	Arnold Origi	32	0	30	0	2	0
Players away from Lillestrøm on loan:
Players who appeared for Lillestrøm no longer at the club:
8	MF	(Norway) NOR	Bjørn Helge Riise	16	0	15	0	1	0
21	FW	(Ivory Coast) CIV	Moryké Fofana	18	9	15	7	3	2
90	FW	(Norway) NOR	Amahl Pellegrino	15	3	4+9	0	2	3

=== Goal scorers ===
Place	Position	Nation	Number	Name	Tippeligaen	Norwegian Cup	Total
1	FW	(Nigeria)	23	Fred Friday	11	6	17
2	MF	(Norway)	11	Erling Knudtzon	10	0	10
2	FW	(Ivory Coast)	21	Moryké Fofana	7	2	9
4	MF	(Norway)	17	Jørgen Kolstad	3	0	3
4	MF	(France)	8	Malaury Martin	3	0	3
4	FW	(Norway)	90	Amahl Pellegrino	0	3	3
7	MF	(Sweden)	7	Johan Andersson	2	0	2
7	FW	(Iceland)	9	Árni Vilhjálmsson	2	0	2
7	DF	(Norway)	3	Simen Kind Mikalsen	2	0	2
7	MF	(Norway)	14	Fredrik Krogstad	1	1	2
7				Own goal	2	0	2
12	DF	(Norway)	13	Frode Kippe	1	0	1
12	MF	(Norway)	10	Marius Lundemo	1	0	1
12	FW	(Norway)	19	Joachim Osvold	0	1	1
				TOTALS	45	13	58

=== Disciplinary record ===
Number	Nation	Position	Name	Tippeligaen		Norwegian Cup		Total	
Number	Nation	Position	Name	Yellow card	Red card	Yellow card	Red card	Yellow card	Red card
2	(Netherlands)	DF	Michael Timisela	1	0	0	0	1	0
3	(Norway)	DF	Simen Kind Mikalsen	1	1	0	0	1	1
4	(Norway)	DF	Marius Amundsen	3	0	0	0	3	0
6	(Iceland)	MF	Finnur Ori Margeirsson	5	0	0	0	5	0
7	(Sweden)	MF	Johan Andersson	1	0	0	0	1	0
8	(Norway)	MF	Bjørn Helge Riise	3	0	0	0	3	0
8	(France)	MF	Malaury Martin	2	0	0	0	2	0
9	(Iceland)	FW	Árni Vilhjálmsson	1	0	0	0	1	0
10	(Norway)	MF	Marius Lundemo	2	0	0	0	2	0
11	(Norway)	MF	Erling Knudtzon	2	0	0	0	2	0
13	(Norway)	DF	Frode Kippe	5	1	0	0	5	1
14	(Norway)	MF	Fredrik Krogstad	1	0	0	0	1	0
17	(Norway)	MF	Jørgen Kolstad	3	0	0	0	3	0
18	(Nigeria)	MF	Bonke Innocent	6	1	0	0	6	1
20	(Norway)	DF	Stian Ringstad	1	0	0	0	1	0
21	(Ivory Coast)	FW	Moryké Fofana	4	0	0	0	4	0
23	(Nigeria)	FW	Fred Friday	1	0	0	0	1	0
31	(Norway)	FW	Sheriff Sinyan	0	0	1	0	1	0
77	(Kenya)	GK	Arnold Origi	2	0	0	0	2	0
90	(Norway)	FW	Amahl Pellegrino	3	0	0	0	3	0
			TOTALS	48	3	1	0	49	3
