= 2016 Lillestrøm SK season =

Lillestrøm
2016 season
- Chairman: Per Mathisen
- Manager: Rúnar Kristinsson
- Stadium: Åråsen Stadion
- Tippeligaen: 12th
- Norwegian Cup: Third Round vs Sandefjord
- Top goalscorer: League: Fred Friday (8); All: Fred Friday (8)

The 2016 season is Lillestrøm's 40th consecutive year in Tippeligaen and their second with Rúnar Kristinsson as manager.

== Squad ==
As of 15 September 2016

Note: Flags indicate national team as defined under FIFA eligibility rules; some limited exceptions apply. Players may hold more than one non-FIFA nationality.

No.	Pos.	Nation	Player
1	GK	ISL	Haraldur Björnsson
3	DF	NOR	Simen Kind Mikalsen
4	DF	NOR	Marius Amundsen
5	DF	NOR	Ole Martin Rindarøy (on loan from Molde)
6	MF	NGR	Ifeanyi Mathew
7	MF	LBN	Bassel Jradi (on loan from Strømsgodset)
8	MF	FRA	Malaury Martin
10	MF	NOR	Marius Lundemo
11	FW	NOR	Erling Knudtzon
12	GK	NOR	Jacob Faye-Lund
13	DF	NOR	Frode Kippe (captain)
14	MF	NOR	Fredrik Krogstad

No.	Pos.	Nation	Player
15	MF	NOR	Erik Brenden
16	DF	NOR	Håkon Skogseid
17	MF	NOR	Jørgen Kolstad
18	MF	NGR	Bonke Innocent
19	FW	ENG	Gary Martin (on loan from Víkingur)
20	FW	NOR	Mohamed Ofkir
21	MF	NOR	Petter Mathias Olsen
22	DF	DEN	Michael Jakobsen (on loan from Esbjerg)
23	FW	SVK	Tomáš Malec (on loan from LASK Linz)
26	MF	NOR	Sheriff Sinyan
29	GK	NOR	Emil Ødegaard
77	GK	KEN	Arnold Origi

=== Out on loan ===
Note: Flags indicate national team as defined under FIFA eligibility rules; some limited exceptions apply. Players may hold more than one non-FIFA nationality.

No.	Pos.	Nation	Player
2	DF	SWE	Martin Falkeborn (at Ull/Kisa)
9	FW	ISL	Árni Vilhjálmsson (at Breiðablik)

No.	Pos.	Nation	Player
27	MF	NOR	Markus Brændsrød (at Strømmen)

== Transfers ==
=== Winter ===
In: Note: Flags indicate national team as defined under FIFA eligibility rules; some limited exceptions apply. Players may hold more than one non-FIFA nationality.

No.	Pos.	Nation	Player
5	DF	NOR	Ole Martin Rindarøy (on loan from (Norway) Molde, previously on loan at (Norway) Start)
7	MF	LBN	Bassel Jradi (on loan from (Norway) Strømsgodset)
15	MF	NOR	Erik Næsbak Brenden (from (Norway) Nybergsund)
21	MF	NOR	Petter Mathias Olsen (Promoted)
22	DF	DEN	Michael Jakobsen (on loan from (Denmark) Esbjerg)
29	GK	NOR	Emil Ødegaard (Promoted)

Out: Note: Flags indicate national team as defined under FIFA eligibility rules; some limited exceptions apply. Players may hold more than one non-FIFA nationality.

No.	Pos.	Nation	Player
2	DF	NED	Michael Timisela (released)
5	DF	FIN	Lum Rexhepi (to (Finland) HJK Helsinki)
6	MF	ISL	Finnur Orri Margeirsson (to (Iceland) KR)
7	MF	SWE	Johan Andersson (released)
14	MF	NOR	Fredrik Krogstad (on loan to (Norway) Ull/Kisa)
19	FW	NOR	Joachim Osvold (to (Germany) Rot-Weiss Essen)
20	DF	NOR	Stian Ringstad (to (Portugal) Braga)
22	DF	NOR	Simen Nordermoen (released)
27	FW	NOR	Markus Brændsrød (on loan to (Norway) Strømmen)

=== Summer ===
In: Note: Flags indicate national team as defined under FIFA eligibility rules; some limited exceptions apply. Players may hold more than one non-FIFA nationality.

No.	Pos.	Nation	Player
1	GK	ISL	Haraldur Björnsson (from (Sweden) Östersund)
6	MF	NGR	Ifeanyi Mathew
19	FW	ENG	Gary Martin (on loan from (Iceland) Víkingur)
23	FW	SVK	Tomáš Malec (on loan from (Slovakia) Trenčín)
41	GK	NOR	Pål Vestly Heigre (on loan from (Norway) Viking)
—	MF	NOR	Fredrik Krogstad (loan return from (Norway) Ull/Kisa)

Out: Note: Flags indicate national team as defined under FIFA eligibility rules; some limited exceptions apply. Players may hold more than one non-FIFA nationality.

No.	Pos.	Nation	Player
2	DF	SWE	Martin Falkeborn (on loan to (Norway) Ull/Kisa)
9	FW	ISL	Árni Vilhjálmsson (on loan to (Iceland) Breiðablik)
23	FW	NGR	Fred Friday (to (Netherlands) AZ)
41	GK	NOR	Pål Vestly Heigre (loan return to (Norway) Viking)

== Competitions ==
=== Tippeligaen ===
==== Results summary ====
Overall								Home						Away					
Pld	W	D	L	GF	GA	GD	Pts	W	D	L	GF	GA	GD	W	D	L	GF	GA	GD
30	7	10	13	44	53	−9	31	4	4	6	22	22	0	3	6	7	22	31	−9

==== Results by round ====
Round	1	2	3	4	5	6	7	8	9	10	11	12	13	14	15	16	17	18	19	20	21	22	23	24	25	26	27	28	29	30
Ground	A	H	A	H	A	H	A	H	A	H	A	H	A	H	H	A	H	A	H	A	H	A	H	A	H	A	A	H	A	H
Result	D	D	L	W	D	D	W	W	L	W	L	L	D	L	L	L	W	L	L	D	D	D	L	L	L	W	W	D	D	W
Position	8	10	14	10	10	8	7	6	8	8	9	9	9	10	10	11	10	11	12	11	12	13	13	15	15	15	14	12	12	12

Updated to match(es) played on 8 November 2016. Source: See Results
A = Away; H = Home; W = Win; D = Draw; L = Loss

==== Results ====
13 March 2016 1	Start	1–1	Lillestrøm	Kristiansand
20:00 CET (UTC+1)	Heikkilä 37'; Hollingen (yellow card) 84'	Summary	Kolstad (yellow card) 26'; Martin 42'; Jradi (yellow card) 69'	Stadium: Sør Arena; Attendance: 3,623; Referee: Svein-Erik Edvartsen

20 March 2016 2	Lillestrøm	1–1	Bodø/Glimt	Lillestrøm
18:00 CET (UTC+1)	Martin (yellow card) 15', (goal) 83'; Innocent (yellow card) 66'	Summary	Jevtović 12'; Babenko (yellow card) 82'	Stadium: Åråsen Stadion; Attendance: 4761; Referee: Martin Lundby

1 April 2016 3	Molde	4–2	Lillestrøm	Molde
19:00 CET (UTC+1)	Singh (yellow card) 3', (goal) 47'; Mostrøm 5'; Svendsen 31'; Hestad (yellow card) 33'; Guðjohnsen 65' (pen.)	Summary	Friday 16'; Mikalsen (yellow card) 39'; Knudtzon 56'; Faye-Lund (yellow card) 64'; Jradi (yellow card) 88'	Stadium: Aker Stadion; Attendance: 7693; Referee: Dag Vidar Hafsås

9 April 2016 4	Lillestrøm	4–0	Sarpsborg 08	Lillestrøm
15:30 CET (UTC+1)	Friday 15', 44'; Mikalsen 23'; Skogseid (yellow card) 54'; Innocent (yellow card) 58'; Rindarøy 90'	Summary	Lund Nielsen (yellow card) 37'	Stadium: Åråsen Stadion; Attendance: 6073; Referee: Svein Oddvar Moen

15 April 2016 5	Haugesund	2–2	Lillestrøm	Haugesund
19:00 CET (UTC+1)	Mæland 10'; Agdestein 52'; Kiss (yellow card) 79'; Izuchukwu (yellow card) 87'	Summary	Mikalsen 34'; Friday 80'; Jradi (yellow card) 91'	Stadium: Haugesund Stadion; Attendance: 4,475; Referee: Ola Hobber Nilsen

21 April 2016 6	Lillestrøm	1–1	Aalesund	Lillestrøm
19:00 CET (UTC+1)	Martin (yellow card) 7'; Friday 38'	Summary	Kirkeskov (yellow card) 26'; Arnarson (yellow card) 26'; Boli 39'; Lie (yellow card) 54'	Stadium: Åråsen Stadion; Attendance: 4,774; Referee: Kai Erik Steen

24 April 2016 7	Odd	1–3	Lillestrøm	Skien
18:00 CET (UTC+1)	Nilsen 72'	Summary	Ofkir 35'; Jradi 49'; Origi (yellow card) 89'; Friday 91'	Stadium: Skagerak Arena; Attendance: 7,322; Referee: Trygve Kjensli

30 April 2016 8	Lillestrøm	2–0	Vålerenga	Lillestrøm
15:30 CET (UTC+1)	Friday 9'; Jradi 30'; Innocent (yellow card) 92'	Summary	Zahid (yellow card) 88'; Wæhler (yellow card) 94'	Stadium: Åråsen Stadion; Attendance: 9,085; Referee: Svein-Erik Edvartsen

7 May 2016 9	Strømsgodset	3–1	Lillestrøm	Drammen
18:00 CEST (UTC+2)	Nguen 24'; Høibråten (yellow card) 39'; Júnior (yellow card) 52'; Høiland 86'	Summary	Kippe (yellow card) 13'; Friday 48'	Stadium: Marienlyst Stadion; Attendance: 6,637; Referee: Tom Harald Hagen

11 May 2016 10	Lillestrøm	1–0	Brann	Lillestrøm
19:00 CEST (UTC+2)	Knudtzon 43'	Summary	Demidov (yellow card) 28'; Acosta (yellow card) 52'; Haugen (yellow card) 80'	Stadium: Åråsen Stadion; Attendance: 5,317; Referee: Kim Andre Johnsen

16 May 2016 11	Rosenborg	2–1	Lillestrøm	Trondheim
18:00 CEST (UTC+2)	Gytkjær 23'; Midtsjø (yellow card) 38'; Konradsen 48'; Eyjólfsson (yellow card) 90'	Summary	Kippe 85'	Stadium: Lerkendal Stadion; Attendance: 21,130; Referee: Tore Hansen

22 May 2016 12	Lillestrøm	1–2	Viking	Lillestrøm
20:00 CEST (UTC+2)	Jradi (yellow card) 16'; Innocent (yellow card) 28'; Martin 77' (pen.)	Summary	Abdullahi 22'; Austbø (yellow card) 76'; Adegbenro 89'; Soares (yellow card) 90'	Stadium: Åråsen Stadion; Attendance: 4,081; Referee: Tommy Skjerven

29 May 2016 13	Sogndal	2–2	Lillestrøm	Sogndalsfjøra
15:30 CEST (UTC+2)	Sarr 49'; Opseth 53'	Summary	Martin 29'; Jradi 39'	Stadium: Fosshaugane Campus; Attendance: 2,869; Referee: Ola Hobber Nilsen

1 July 2016 14	Lillestrøm	2–4	Tromsø	Lillestrøm
19:00 CEST (UTC+2)	Martin 14'; Kippe (yellow card) 51'; Jradi 65'; Amundsen (yellow card) 85'	Summary	Olsen 3'; Wangberg (yellow card) 21'; Ingebrigtsen 29'; Moussa 51' (pen.) (yellow card) 72'; Andersen 79'	Stadium: Åråsen Stadion; Attendance: 4,352; Referee: Svein-Erik Edvartsen

10 July 2016 15	Lillestrøm	1–2	Stabæk	Lillestrøm
18:00 CEST (UTC+2)	Kippe (yellow card) 57'; J. Kolstad 88'	Summary	Njie 37'; Meling (yellow card) 61'; Mehmeti 89'	Stadium: Åråsen Stadion; Attendance: 4,185; Referee: Kai-Erik Steen

17 July 2016 16	Sarpsborg 08	3–0	Lillestrøm	Sarpsborg
20:00 CEST (UTC+2)	Lindberg 17'; Nielsen 77', 80'	Summary	Mikalsen (yellow card) 6'	Stadium: Sarpsborg Stadion; Attendance: 3,514; Referee: Ola Hobber Nilsen

24 July 2016 17	Lillestrøm	2–0	Strømsgodset	Lillestrøm
20:00 CEST (UTC+2)	Lundemo 45'; Mikalsen 48'; Kolstad (yellow card) 56'	Summary		Stadium: Åråsen Stadion; Attendance: 4,351; Referee: Tore Hansen

31 July 2016 18	Aalesund	2–0	Lillestrøm	Ålesund
15:30 CEST (UTC+2)	Kirkeskov 49'; Boli 52'; Gyasi (yellow card) 65'	Summary		Stadium: Color Line Stadion; Attendance: 5,652; Referee: Tommy Skjerven

6 August 2016 19	Lillestrøm	3–4	Rosenborg	Kjeller
18:00 CEST (UTC+2)	Innocent (yellow card) 46'; Knudtzon 52'; Kippe (yellow card) 55' (yellow-red card) 90'; Martin 64'; Knudtzon (yellow card) 70'; Ofkir 89'	Summary	Gytkjær 18', 25', 34'; Midtsjø 39'; Midtsjø (yellow card) 76'	Stadium: Åråsen Stadion; Attendance: 8,371; Referee: Svein Oddvar Moen

13 August 2016 20	Bodø/Glimt	1–1	Lillestrøm	Bodø
15:30 CEST (UTC+2)	Jevtović (yellow card) 45'; Berg (yellow card) 54'; Babenko (yellow card) 61'; Azemi 71'	Summary	Rindarøy (yellow card) 37'; Ofkir 48'; Martin (yellow card) 90+4'	Stadium: Aspmyra Stadion; Attendance: 2,938; Referee: Tore Hansen

20 August 2016 21	Lillestrøm	1–1	Haugesund	Kjeller
15:30 CEST (UTC+2)	Innocent (yellow card) 43'; Rindarøy (yellow card) 89'; Martin 90+2'	Summary	Myrestam 40'; Haraldseid (yellow card) 46'; Abdi (yellow card) 54'; Kiss (yellow card) 56'	Stadium: Åråsen Stadion; Attendance: 4,756; Referee: Tom Harald Hagen

28 August 2016 22	Viking	2–2	Lillestrøm	Stavanger
18:00 CEST (UTC+2)	Danielsen 18'; Ryerson 62'	Summary	Knudtzon 20' (yellow card) 65'; Lundemo 83'	Stadium: Viking Stadion; Attendance: 1,800; Referee: Trygve Kjensli

11 September 2016 23	Lillestrøm	2–4	Odd	Lillestrøm
18:00 CEST (UTC+2)	Martin 35' (yellow card) 45+2'; Mikalsen 84'; Kippe (yellow card) 90+2'	Summary	Samuelsen (yellow card) 25'; Ruud 45', 65', 90+3'; Haugen 90+5'	Stadium: Åråsen Stadion; Attendance: 5,613; Referee: Ola Hobber Nilsen

17 September 2016 24	Tromsø	2–1	Lillestrøm	Tromsø
15:30 CEST (UTC+2)	Åsen 45'; Olsen 90'; Antonsen (yellow card) 90+1'	Summary	Malec 66'	Stadium: Alfheim Stadion; Attendance: 3,674; Referee: Tore Hansen

25 September 2016 25	Lillestrøm	1–2	Sogndal	Lillestrøm
15:30 CEST (UTC+2)	Kippe (red card) 64'; Mathew 69'	Summary	Koomson 65' (pen.); Sveen 72'	Stadium: Åråsen Stadion; Attendance: 7,088; Referee: Svein-Erik Edvartsen

1 October 2016 26	Stabæk	1–2	Lillestrøm	Bærum
15:30 CEST (UTC+2)	Hanche-Olsen (yellow card) 69'; Pedersen 90'	Summary	Skogseid (yellow card) 25'; Sinyan 35'; Origi (yellow card) 45+2'; Martin 51'; Innocent (yellow card) 68'	Stadium: Nadderud Stadion; Attendance: 4,252; Referee: Tore Hansen

16 October 2016 27	Brann	1–2	Lillestrøm	Bergen
18:00 CEST (UTC+2)	Karadas 55'	Summary	Matthew 30' (yellow card) 69'; Jradi (yellow card) 65'; Martin (yellow card) 66'; Knudtzon 85'	Stadium: Brann Stadion; Attendance: 11,876; Referee: Ola Hobber Nilsen

23 October 2016 28	Lillestrøm	1–1	Start	Lillestrøm
18:00 CEST (UTC+2)	Kolstad (yellow card) 41'; Malec 61'	Summary	Antwi 25' (yellow card) 26'	Stadium: Åråsen Stadion; Attendance: 8,796; Referee: Espen Eskås

30 October 2016 29	Vålerenga	1–1	Lillestrøm	Oslo
18:00 CET (UTC+1)	Abdellaoue (yellow card) 21'; Larsen (yellow card) 64'; Sakor 80'; Stengel (yellow card) 89'	Summary	Innocent (yellow card) 20'; Kippe (yellow card) 20'; Martin 32'; Mathew (yellow card) 51'	Stadium: Ullevaal Stadion; Attendance: 19,038; Referee: Dag Vidar Hafsås

6 November 2016 30	Lillestrøm	1–0	Molde	Lillestrøm
18:00 CEST (UTC+2)	Martin 71'; Innocent (yellow card) 80'	Summary	Flo (yellow card) 34'	Stadium: Åråsen Stadion; Attendance: 6,233; Referee: Ola Hobber Nilsen

==== Table ====
Pos	Team	Pld	W	D	L	GF	GA	GD	Pts	Qualification or relegation
10	Vålerenga	30	10	8	12	41	39	+2	38	
11	Sogndal	30	8	12	10	33	37	−4	36	
12	Lillestrøm	30	8	10	12	45	50	−5	34	
13	Tromsø	30	9	7	14	36	46	−10	34	
14	Stabæk (O)	30	8	7	15	35	42	−7	31	Qualification for the relegation play-offs

Source: Football Association of Norway (in Norwegian), Soccerway
Rules for classification: 1) Points; 2) Goal difference; 3) Goals scored; 4) Head-to-head points; 5) Head-to-head goal difference; 6) Head-to-head away goals scored (between two teams).
(O) Play-off winners

=== Norwegian Cup ===
12 April 2016 First Round	Aurskog-Høland	1–4	Lillestrøm	Høland
18:00 CEST (UTC+1)	Jensen (yellow card) 15'; Vestreng 27'; Hoftvedt (yellow card) 65'	Summary	Vilhjálmsson 7', 62' (pen.), 92' (pen.); Amundsen (yellow card) 11'; Jradi 65'	Stadium: Høland Stadion; Attendance: 890; Referee: Ajdin Medic

27 April 2016 Second Round	Lillehammer	0–2	Lillestrøm	Lillehammer
18:00 CEST (UTC+1)	Jota (yellow card) 48'; Bentdal (yellow card) 57'; Vatne (yellow card) 70'	[ Summary]	Brenden 71'; Ofkir 81'	Stadium: Stampesletta; Attendance: 993; Referee: Sulman Maroof Hussain

4 May 2016 Third Round	Sandefjord	1–0	Lillestrøm	Sandefjord
18:00 CEST (UTC+2)	Mjelde 41'	Summary	Ofkir (yellow card) 29'	Stadium: Komplett Arena; Attendance: 1,076; Referee: Bjørn Hansen

== Squad statistics ==
As of match played 6 November 2016

=== Appearances and goals ===
No.	Pos	Nat	Player	Total		Tippeligaen		Norwegian Cup	
No.	Pos	Nat	Player	Apps	Goals	Apps	Goals	Apps	Goals
1	GK	(Iceland) ISL	Haraldur Björnsson	1	0	1	0	0	0
3	DF	(Norway) NOR	Simen Kind Mikalsen	29	4	27	4	1+1	0
4	DF	(Norway) NOR	Marius Amundsen	32	0	29	0	3	0
5	DF	(Norway) NOR	Ole Martin Rindarøy	21	1	9+10	1	2	0
6	MF	(Nigeria) NGR	Ifeanyi Matthew	8	2	6+2	2	0	0
7	MF	(Lebanon) LBN	Bassel Jradi	29	5	26	4	3	1
8	MF	(France) FRA	Malaury Martin	33	7	25+5	7	1+2	0
10	MF	(Norway) NOR	Marius Lundemo	21	2	18+1	2	1+1	0
11	MF	(Norway) NOR	Erling Knudtzon	28	5	25+2	5	1	0
12	GK	(Norway) NOR	Jacob Faye-Lund	5	0	4	0	1	0
13	DF	(Norway) NOR	Frode Kippe	24	1	19+3	1	2	0
15	MF	(Norway) NOR	Erik Brenden	8	1	0+6	0	2	1
16	DF	(Norway) NOR	Håkon Skogseid	29	0	28	0	1	0
17	MF	(Norway) NOR	Jørgen Kolstad	17	1	7+8	1	2	0
18	MF	(Nigeria) NGR	Bonke Innocent	26	0	23+1	0	2	0
19	FW	(England) ENG	Gary Martin	10	4	7+3	4	0	0
20	FW	(Norway) NOR	Mohamed Ofkir	26	4	13+10	3	2+1	1
22	DF	(Denmark) DEN	Michael Jakobsen	14	0	9+4	0	1	0
23	FW	(Slovakia) SVK	Tomáš Malec	12	2	8+4	2	0	0
26	MF	(Norway) NOR	Sheriff Sinyan	11	1	4+6	1	1	0
77	GK	(Kenya) KEN	Arnold Origi	25	0	23	0	2	0
Players away from Lillestrøm on loan:
2	DF	(Sweden) SWE	Martin Falkeborn	2	0	0	0	2	0
9	FW	(Iceland) ISL	Árni Vilhjálmsson	10	3	3+4	0	3	3
Players who appeared for Lillestrøm no longer at the club:
23	FW	(Nigeria) NGR	Fred Friday	14	8	14	8	0	0
41	GK	(Norway) NOR	Pål Vestly Heigre	2	0	2	0	0	0

=== Goal scorers ===
Place	Position	Nation	Number	Name	Tippeligaen	Norwegian Cup	Total
1	FW	(Nigeria)	23	Fred Friday	8	0	8
2	MF	(France)	8	Malaury Martin	7	0	7
3	MF	(Norway)	11	Erling Knudtzon	5	0	5
3	MF	(Lebanon)	7	Bassel Jradi	4	1	5
5	DF	(Norway)	3	Simen Kind Mikalsen	4	0	4
5	FW	(England)	19	Gary Martin	4	0	4
5	FW	(Norway)	20	Mohamed Ofkir	3	1	4
8	FW	(Iceland)	9	Árni Vilhjálmsson	0	3	3
9	MF	(Norway)	10	Marius Lundemo	2	0	2
9	MF	(Nigeria)	6	Ifeanyi Matthew	2	0	2
9	FW	(Slovakia)	23	Tomáš Malec	2	0	2
12	DF	(Norway)	13	Frode Kippe	1	0	1
12	DF	(Norway)	5	Ole Martin Rindarøy	1	0	1
12	MF	(Norway)	17	Jørgen Kolstad	1	0	1
12	MF	(Norway)	15	Erik Brenden	1	0	1
12	MF	(Norway)	26	Sheriff Sinyan	1	0	1
				TOTALS	45	6	51

=== Disciplinary record ===
Number	Nation	Position	Name	Tippeligaen		Norwegian Cup		Total	
Number	Nation	Position	Name	Yellow card	Red card	Yellow card	Red card	Yellow card	Red card
3	(Norway)	DF	Simen Kind Mikalsen	2	0	0	0	2	0
4	(Norway)	DF	Marius Amundsen	1	0	1	0	2	0
5	(Norway)	DF	Ole Martin Rindarøy	2	0	0	0	2	0
6	(Nigeria)	MF	Ifeanyi Matthew	2	0	0	0	2	0
7	(Lebanon)	MF	Bassel Jradi	5	0	0	0	5	0
8	(France)	MF	Malaury Martin	2	0	0	0	2	0
11	(Norway)	MF	Erling Knudtzon	2	0	0	0	2	0
12	(Norway)	GK	Jacob Faye-Lund	1	0	0	0	1	0
13	(Norway)	DF	Frode Kippe	7	2	0	0	7	2
16	(Norway)	DF	Håkon Skogseid	2	0	0	0	2	0
17	(Norway)	MF	Jørgen Kolstad	3	0	0	0	3	0
18	(Nigeria)	MF	Bonke Innocent	9	0	0	0	9	0
19	(England)	FW	Gary Martin	3	0	0	0	3	0
20	(Norway)	MF	Mohamed Ofkir	0	0	1	0	1	0
77	(Kenya)	GK	Arnold Origi	2	0	0	0	2	0
			TOTALS	43	2	2	0	45	2
