= 2014 Lillestrøm SK season =

Lillestrøm
2014 season
- Chairman: Øystein Neerland
- Manager: Magnus Haglund
- Stadium: Åråsen Stadion
- Tippeligaen: 5th
- Norwegian Cup: Quarter-finals vs Sarpsborg 08
- Top goalscorer: League: Pálmi Rafn Pálmason (9); All: Two Players (9)

The 2014 season is Lillestrøm's 38th consecutive year in Tippeligaen and their third with Magnus Haglund as manager.

== Squad ==
As of 8 August 2014

Note: Flags indicate national team as defined under FIFA eligibility rules; some limited exceptions apply. Players may hold more than one non-FIFA nationality.

No.	Pos.	Nation	Player
3	DF	NOR	Simen Kind Mikalsen
4	DF	NOR	Marius Amundsen
5	DF	NOR	Magnar Ødegaard
7	FW	SWE	Johan Andersson
8	MF	NOR	Bjørn Helge Riise
9	FW	NOR	Amahl Pellegrino
10	MF	NOR	Petter Vaagan Moen (vice-captain)
11	MF	NOR	Erling Knudtzon
12	GK	NOR	Jacob Faye-Lund
13	DF	NOR	Frode Kippe (captain)

No.	Pos.	Nation	Player
14	MF	ISL	Pálmi Rafn Pálmason
15	MF	NOR	Marius Lundemo
16	MF	NOR	Ohi Omoijuanfo
17	MF	NOR	Erik Mjelde
18	MF	NGR	Bonke Innocent
20	DF	NOR	Stian Ringstad
21	FW	CIV	Moryké Fofana
22	DF	NOR	Simen Nordermoen
23	FW	NGR	Fred Friday
77	GK	KEN	Arnold Origi

== Transfers ==
=== Winter ===
In: Note: Flags indicate national team as defined under FIFA eligibility rules; some limited exceptions apply. Players may hold more than one non-FIFA nationality.

No.	Pos.	Nation	Player
3	DF	NOR	Simen Kind Mikalsen (from (Norway) Ull/Kisa)
5	DF	NOR	Magnar Ødegaard (on loan from (Norway) Molde)
9	FW	NOR	Tommy Høiland (on loan from (Norway) Molde)
15	MF	NOR	Marius Lundemo (from (Norway) Bærum)

Out: Note: Flags indicate national team as defined under FIFA eligibility rules; some limited exceptions apply. Players may hold more than one non-FIFA nationality.

No.	Pos.	Nation	Player
3	DF	NOR	Isak Scheel (end of contract)
6	DF	AUT	Thomas Piermayr (released)
18	MF	NOR	Markus Furseth (to (Norway) Ull/Kisa)
22	FW	NOR	Thorstein Helstad (end of contract)
24	DF	NOR	Marius Høibråten (to (Norway) Strømsgodset)
27	DF	SWE	Fredrik Stoor (to (Denmark) Viborg)

=== Summer ===
In: Note: Flags indicate national team as defined under FIFA eligibility rules; some limited exceptions apply. Players may hold more than one non-FIFA nationality.

No.	Pos.	Nation	Player
4	DF	NOR	Marius Amundsen (from (Norway) Strømmen IF)
9	FW	NOR	Amahl Pellegrino (from (Norway) Bærum)
12	GK	NOR	Jacob Faye-Lund (from (Norway) Fram Larvik)
18	MF	NGR	Bonke Innocent (from (Nigeria) Bujoc FC)

Out: Note: Flags indicate national team as defined under FIFA eligibility rules; some limited exceptions apply. Players may hold more than one non-FIFA nationality.

No.	Pos.	Nation	Player
1	GK	NOR	Kenneth Udjus (to (Norway) Sogndal, on loan)
2	DF	NOR	Anders Østli (to (Denmark) FC Vestsjælland)
4	MF	NOR	Ruben Gabrielsen (to (Norway) Molde)
9	FW	NOR	Tommy Høiland (Loan return to (Norway) Molde)
19	FW	NOR	Joachim Osvold (to (Finland) TPS, on loan)

== Competitions ==
=== Friendlies ===
17 January 2014	Lillestrøm (Norway)	3–4	(Norway) Strømsgodset	Lillestrøm
12:00 CET (UTC+1)	Knudtzon 5'; Riise 71'; Knudtzon 76'	Summary	Storflor 18'; Sætra 30'; Wikheim 40'; Olsen 90'	Stadium: LSK-Hallen

25 January 2014	Lillestrøm (Norway)	3–0	(Sweden) Häcken	Lillestrøm
14:00 CET (UTC+1)	Ødegaard 8'; Riise 59'; Fofana 82'	Report		Stadium: LSK-Hallen; Attendance: 482

8 February 2013	Lillestrøm (Norway)	1–3	(Norway) Sarpsborg 08	Lillestrøm
14:00 CET (UTC+1)	Omoijuanfo 15'	Report	Samuel 53'; Thórarinsson 73'; Zajić 90'	Stadium: Åråsen Stadio

15 February 2014	Lillestrøm (Norway)	2–1	(Norway) Stabæk	Lillestrøm
14:00 CET (UTC+1)	Riise 8'; Pálmason 15'	Report	Serigne 75'	Stadium: Åråsen stadion

20 February 2014	Raufoss (Norway)	2–4	(Norway) Lillestrøm	Raufoss
18:30 CET (UTC+1)	Haug 60'; Solbakken 85'	Report	Ringstad 35'; Pálmason 76'; Knudtzon 83'; Ofkir 90'	Stadium: Storhallen

5 March 2014	Vålerenga (Norway)	2–0	(Norway) Lillestrøm	Spain
19:00 CET (UTC+1)	Berre 60'; Kjartansson 63'	Report		Stadium: Pinatar Arena

8 March 2014	Lillestrøm (Norway)	3–2	(Norway) Strømmen	Lillestrøm
14:00 CET (UTC+1)	Mjelde 39'; Mjelde 72'; Østli 87'	Report	Amundsen 14'; El Haj 42'	Stadium: LSK-Hallen

14 March 2014	Lillestrøm (Norway)	1–1	(Norway) Molde	Lillestrøm
16:00 CET (UTC+1)	Pálmason 17'	Report	Sigurdarson 76'	Stadium: LSK-Hallen

22 March 2014	Odd (Norway)	3–1	(Norway) Lillestrøm	Skien
14:00 CEST (UTC+1)	Eriksen 41' 55'; Halvorsen 81'	Summary	Gabrielsen 70'	Stadium: Skagerak Arena

=== Tippeligaen ===
==== Results summary ====
Overall								Home						Away					
Pld	W	D	L	GF	GA	GD	Pts	W	D	L	GF	GA	GD	W	D	L	GF	GA	GD
29	13	7	9	48	33	+15	46	10	2	3	34	13	+21	3	5	6	14	20	−6

==== Results by round ====
Round	1	2	3	4	5	6	7	8	9	10	11	12	13	14	15	16	17	18	19	20	21	22	23	24	25	26	27	28	29	30
Ground	A	H	H	A	H	A	H	A	H	A	H	A	H	A	H	A	A	H	A	H	A	H	A	H	A	H	A	H	H	A
Result	D	W	L	L	D	W	W	W	L	D	W	L	W	L	D	D	D	W	D	W	W	W	L	W	L	L	L	W	W	L
Position	10	2	7	11	10	8	6	6	7	8	5	7	6	6	6	6	7	6	6	6	5	4	4	4	5	5	5	5	5	5

Updated to match(es) played on 2 November 2014. Source: see below
A = Away; H = Home; W = Win; D = Draw; L = Loss

==== Fixtures ====
29 March 2014 1	Haugesund	1–1	Lillestrøm	Haugesund
15:30 CET (UTC+1)	Gytkjær 81'; Elsner (yellow card) 88'	Summary	Ringstad 76'	Stadium: Haugesund Stadion; Attendance: 5,649; Referee: Espen Berntsen

6 April 2014 2	Lillestrøm	4–1	Sandnes Ulf	Lillestrøm
18:00 CEST (UTC+2)	Riise (yellow card) 39'; Moen 45' (pen.); Pálmason 58'; Ringstad (yellow card) 75'; Halldórsson 78' (o.g.); Omoijuanfo 90'	Summary	Raskaj (yellow card) 11'; Skjølsvik (yellow card) 40' (yellow-red card) 77'; Jaiteh (yellow card) 45+3'; Rubio 67'	Stadium: Åråsen Stadion; Attendance: 5,127; Referee: Tom Harald Hagen

12 April 2014 3	Lillestrøm	0–1	Viking	Lillestrøm
15:30 CEST (UTC+2)		Summary	Böðvarsson 86' 69'	Stadium: Åråsen Stadion; Attendance: 5,157; Referee: Per Ivar Staberg

21 April 2014 4	Brann	2–0	Lillestrøm	Bergen
18:00 CEST (UTC+2)	Orlov 53', 69'; El Fakiri (yellow card) 73'	Summary		Stadium: Brann Stadion; Attendance: 9,641; Referee: Svein Oddvar Moen

28 April 2014 5	Lillestrøm	0–0	Aalesund	Lillestrøm
19:00 CEST (UTC+2)	Ringstad (yellow card) 69'	Summary		Stadium: Åråsen Stadion; Attendance: 5,230; Referee: Ola Hobber Nilsen

1 May 2014 6	Bodø/Glimt	1–2	Lillestrøm	Bodø
18:00 CEST (UTC+2)	Chatto 13'	Summary	Knudtzon 6'; Fofana 75'	Stadium: Aspmyra Stadion; Attendance: 3,807; Referee: Brage Sandmoen

4 May 2014 7	Lillestrøm	2–0	Sogndal	Lillestrøm
18:00 CEST (UTC+2)	Pálmason 27', (yellow card) 52'; Knudtzon 48'	Summary	Karadas (yellow card) 16'	Stadium: Åråsen Stadion; Attendance: 5,058; Referee: Trygve Kjensli

11 May 2014 8	Odd	0–2	Lillestrøm	Skien
15:30 CEST (UTC+2)	Rashani (yellow card) 52'	Summary	Ringstad 11'; Lundemo 40', (yellow card) 67'; Origi (yellow card) 85'	Stadium: Skagerak Arena; Attendance: 6,372; Referee: Omar Rafiq

16 May 2014 9	Lillestrøm	1–2	Molde	Lillestrøm
18:00 CEST (UTC+2)	Gabrielsen 17', (yellow card) 90+4'; Knudtzon (yellow card) 66'	Summary	Chima Chukwu 14'; Hestad (yellow card) 39'; Hovland 42'; Singh (yellow card) 90+3'	Stadium: Åråsen Stadion; Attendance: 10,965; Referee: Tom Harald Hagen

19 May 2014 10	Vålerenga	2–2	Lillestrøm	Oslo
18:00 CEST (UTC+2)	Lindkvist 21'; Gunnarsson (yellow card) 66'	Summary	Kippe (yellow card) 12', (goal) 18', , 51' (o.g.); Knudtzon (yellow card) 67'; Omoijuanfo (yellow card) 70'; Fofana 85', (yellow card) 86'	Stadium: Ullevaal Stadion; Attendance: 11,783; Referee: Svein Oddvar Moen

24 May 2014 11	Lillestrøm	5–1	Stabæk	Lillestrøm
15:30 CEST (UTC+2)	Gabrielsen 18'; Knudtzon 37'; Fofana 44'; Høiland 73', 84'	Summary	Thomas (red card) 4'; Kassi 79'Sortevik (yellow card) 72'	Stadium: Åråsen Stadion; Attendance: 5,415; Referee: Svein-Erik Edvartsen

9 June 2014 12	Rosenborg	3–1	Lillestrøm	Trondheim
19:00 CEST (UTC+2)	Selnæs 38', (yellow card) 91'; Mikkelsen 72'; Riski 74'	Summary	Kippe 55'; Gabrielsen (yellow card) 67'; Høiland (yellow card) 84'	Stadium: Lerkendal Stadion; Attendance: 11,617; Referee: Tommy Skjerven

12 June 2014 13	Lillestrøm	3–0	Strømsgodset	Lillestrøm
19:00 CEST (UTC+2)	Fofana 6'; Knudtzon 35'; Omoijuanfo (yellow card) 59'; Høiland 71'	Summary	Abu (yellow card) 38'	Stadium: Åråsen Stadion; Attendance: 5,315; Referee: Ken Henry Johnsen

6 July 2014 14	Start	3–1	Lillestrøm	Kristiansand
18:00 CEST (UTC+2)	Tripić 33' (pen.) (yellow card) 39'; Børufsen 47' (yellow card) 56'; Hoff 68'	Summary	Omoijuanfo (yellow card) 5'; Kippe (yellow card) 16'; Mjelde 36'	Stadium: Sør Arena; Attendance: 5,286; Referee: Tom Harald Hagen

12 July 2014 15	Lillestrøm	0–0	Sarpsborg 08	Lillestrøm
18:00 CEST (UTC+2)	Gabrielsen (yellow card) 37'	Summary	Thomassen (yellow card) 37'; Breive (yellow card) 48'	Stadium: Åråsen Stadion; Attendance: 4,376; Referee: Tore Hansen

20 July 2014 16	Viking	0–0	Lillestrøm	Stavanger
19:00 CEST (UTC+2)	Sigurðsson (yellow card) 70'	Summary	Fofana (yellow card) 39'; Mikalsen (yellow card) 65'	Stadium: Viking Stadion; Attendance: 7,828; Referee: Espen Berntsen

26 July 2014 17	Aalesund	1–1	Lillestrøm	Ålesund
15:30 CEST (UTC+2)	Karnass (yellow card) 53'; Mattila 66'	Summary	Andersson (yellow card) 12'; Mikalsen (yellow card) 45'; Pálmason 89'	Stadium: Color Line Stadion; Attendance: 6,596; Referee: Per Ivar Staberg

3 August 2014 18	Lillestrøm	4–3	Brann	Lillestrøm
19:00 CEST (UTC+2)	Moen 35' (pen.), 90+3'; Lundemo 41'; Pálmason , 45+1' (o.g.); Friday 90+1'	Summary	Mojsov (yellow card) 40', (yellow card) 81' (yellow card) (yellow-red card); Badji (yellow card) 52'; Barmen 70'; Orlov 72'	Stadium: Åråsen Stadion; Attendance: 5,497; Referee: Dag Vidar Hafsås

10 August 2014 19	Sandnes Ulf	0–0	Lillestrøm	Sandnes
18:00 CEST (UTC+2)		Summary		Stadium: Sandnes idrettspark Attendance: 2,841; Referee: Per Ivar Staberg

17 August 2013 20	Lillestrøm	2–1	Vålerenga	Lillestrøm
18:00 CEST (UTC+2)	Moen 19'; Knudtzon 73'	Summary	Berre 46'	Stadium: Åråsen Stadion; Attendance: 8,667; Referee: Svein Erik Edvartsen

24 August 2014 21	Sogndal	0–1	Lillestrøm	Sogndalsfjøra
18:00 CEST (UTC+2)		Summary	Amundsen 89'	Stadium: Fosshaugane Campus; Attendance: 3,556; Referee: Martin Lundby

31 August 2014 22	Lillestrøm	2–0	Haugesund	Lillestrøm
18:00 CEST (UTC+2)	Fofana 61'; Moen (yellow card) 62', (goal) 80'	Summary		Stadium: Åråsen Stadion; Attendance: 4,759; Referee: Ola Hobber Nilsen

14 September 2014 23	Molde	3–2	Lillestrøm	Molde
19:00 CEST (UTC+2)	Gulbrandsen 10'; Elyounoussi 12', 62'	Summary	Andersson (yellow card) 44'; Pálmason 47'; Moen 60' (yellow card) 74'	Stadium: Aker Stadion; Attendance: 9,932; Referee: Dag Vidar Hafsås

21 September 2014 24	Lillestrøm	2–0	Odd	Lillestrøm
18:00 CEST (UTC+2)	Moen 30'; Ringstad 71'	Summary		Stadium: Åråsen Stadion; Attendance: 5,837; Referee: Per Ivar Staberg

28 September 2014 25	Stabæk	2–0	Lillestrøm	Bærum
18:00 CEST (UTC+2)	Brustad 3' (yellow card) 86'; Kassi 41'	Summary		Stadium: Nadderud; Attendance: 3,365; Referee: Svein Oddvar Moen

3 October 2014 26	Lillestrøm	0–2	Rosenborg	Lillestrøm
19:00 CEST (UTC+2)	Andersson (yellow card) 66'; Riise (yellow card) 88'	Summary	Reginiussen (yellow card) 56'; Helland 68'; Jensen 89'	Stadium: Åråsen Stadion; Attendance: 6,672; Referee: Tom Harald Hagen

19 October 2014 27	Strømsgodset	2–1	Lillestrøm	Drammen
18:00 CEST (UTC+2)	Ødegaard 21', 41'	Summary	Kippe 85'	Stadium: Marinelyst Stadion; Attendance: 7,063; Referee: Tom Harald Hagen

26 October 2014 28	Lillestrøm	4–1	Start	Lillestrøm
18:00 CET (UTC+1)	Pálmason 33', 38', 69'; Knudtzon 50'	Summary	Mikalsen 72' (o.g.)	Stadium: Åråsen Stadion; Attendance: 5,583; Referee: Ola Hobber Nilsen

2 November 2014 29	Lillestrøm	4–0	Bodø/Glimt	Lillestrøm
18:00 CET (UTC+1)	Friday 12', 83'; Fofana 13'; Pálmason 90'	Summary	Braaten (yellow card) 28'; Berntsen (yellow card) 73'	Stadium: Åråsen Stadion; Attendance: 4,840; Referee: Trygve Kjensli

9 November 2014 30	Sarpsborg 08	3–2	Lillestrøm	Sarpsborg
18:00 CET (UTC+1)	Kronberg 26' (pen.); Zajić 76'; Thomassen 82'	Summary	Mjelde 43'; Friday (yellow card) 60'; Pálmason 86'	Stadium: Sarpsborg Stadion; Attendance: 3,767; Referee: Per Ivar Staberg

==== Table ====
Pos	Team	Pld	W	D	L	GF	GA	GD	Pts	Qualification or relegation
3	Odd	30	17	7	6	52	32	+20	58	Qualification for the Europa League first qualifying round (Note: Since the winners of the 2014 Norwegian Cup (Molde) qualified for European competition based on their league position, the berth (Europa League first qualifying round) was passed down the league to Strømsgodset.)
4	Strømsgodset	30	15	5	10	48	42	+6	50	Qualification for the Europa League first qualifying round
5	Lillestrøm	30	13	7	10	49	35	+14	46	
6	Vålerenga	30	11	9	10	59	53	+6	42	
7	Aalesund	30	11	8	11	40	39	+1	41	

Source: fotball.no
Rules for classification: 1) points; 2) goal difference; 3) number of goals scored.

=== Norwegian Cup ===
24 April 2014 First round	Fet IL	0–7	Lillestrøm	Fetsund
18:00 CEST (UTC+2)		Summary	Omoijuanfo 15', 92'; Fofana 60', 69'; Mjelde 71', 76'; Knudtzon 83'	Stadium: Fedrelandet kunstgress Attendance: 1,505; Referee: Anders Gjermshus

7 May 2014 Second round	Moss IL	0–5	Lillestrøm	Moss
18:00 CET (UTC+2)		Report	Moen 3' (pen.), 27'; Høiland 6', 87'; Mjelde 15'	Stadium: Melløs Stadion; Attendance: 585; Referee: Espen Eskås

4 June 2014 Third round	Lillestrøm	4–1	Kongsvinger IL	Lillestrøm
18:00 CET (UTC+2)	Mjelde 34', 90'; Moen 51'; Høiland 74'	Report	Myklebust 60'	Stadium: Åråsen Stadion; Attendance: 902; Referee: Trygve Kjensli

27 June 2014 Fourth Round	Aalesund	1–3	Lillestrøm	Ålesund
19:00 CET (UTC+2)	Aarøy (yellow card) 84'; James 90'; Matland (yellow card) 90'	Report	Lundemo (yellow card) 33'; Moen 51'; Kippe (yellow card) 84'; Origi (yellow card) 90'; Østli 119'; Høiland 120'; Ringstad (yellow card) 120'	Stadium: Color Line Stadion; Attendance: 2,589; Referee: Kristoffer Helgerud

14 August 2014 Quarter-finals	Lillestrøm	0–2	Sarpsborg 08	Lillestrøm
18:00 CET (UTC+2)	Lundemo (yellow card) 22'	Report	Zajić 15'; Nordvik (yellow card) 48'; Wiig 80'; Þórarinsson (yellow card) 84'	Stadium: Åråsen Stadion; Attendance: 5,278; Referee: Ken Henry Johnsen

== Squad statistics ==
As of match played 9 November 2014

=== Appearances and goals ===
No.	Pos	Nat	Player	Total		Tippeligaen		Norwegian Cup	
No.	Pos	Nat	Player	Apps	Goals	Apps	Goals	Apps	Goals
3	DF	(Norway) NOR	Simen Kind Mikalsen	19	0	7+9	0	2+1	0
4	DF	(Norway) NOR	Marius Amundsen	14	1	14	1	0	0
5	DF	(Norway) NOR	Magnar Ødegaard	24	0	21	0	3	0
7	MF	(Sweden) SWE	Johan Andersson	28	0	26	0	1+1	0
8	MF	(Norway) NOR	Bjørn Helge Riise	27	1	27	1	0	0
9	FW	(Norway) NOR	Amahl Pellegrino	7	0	2+5	0	0	0
10	MF	(Norway) NOR	Petter Vaagan Moen	30	10	22+5	7	3	3
11	MF	(Norway) NOR	Erling Knudtzon	29	7	26+1	6	1+1	1
12	GK	(Norway) NOR	Jacob Faye-Lund	0	0	0	0	0	0
13	DF	(Norway) NOR	Frode Kippe	21	3	19	3	2	0
14	MF	(Iceland) ISL	Pálmi Rafn Pálmason	28	9	24+3	9	1	0
15	MF	(Norway) NOR	Marius Lundemo	27	2	24+2	2	1	0
16	MF	(Norway) NOR	Ohi Omoijuanfo	27	3	11+13	1	3	2
17	MF	(Norway) NOR	Erik Mjelde	22	7	2+17	2	3	5
18	MF	(Nigeria) NGR	Bonke Innocent	1	0	0+1	0	0	0
20	DF	(Norway) NOR	Stian Ringstad	25	3	24	3	1	0
21	FW	(Ivory Coast) CIV	Moryké Fofana	32	8	24+5	6	1+2	2
22	DF	(Norway) NOR	Simen Nordermoen	1	0	0	0	1	0
23	FW	(Nigeria) NGR	Fred Friday	17	3	2+14	3	0+1	0
32	MF	(Norway) NOR	Jørgen Kolstad	1	0	0+1	0	0	0
77	GK	(Kenya) KEN	Arnold Origi	32	0	30	0	2	0
Players away from Lillestrøm on loan:
1	GK	(Norway) NOR	Kenneth Udjus	2	0	0	0	2	0
19	FW	(Norway) NOR	Joachim Osvold	1	0	0	0	0+1	0
Players who appeared for Lillestrøm no longer at the club:
2	DF	(Norway) NOR	Anders Østli	12	0	10	0	2	0
9	FW	(Norway) NOR	Tommy Høiland	15	5	2+10	3	3	2
4	MF	(Norway) NOR	Ruben Gabrielsen	17	2	14	2	1+2	0

=== Goal scorers ===
Place	Position	Nation	Number	Name	Tippeligaen	Norwegian Cup	Total
1	MF	(Iceland)	14	Pálmi Rafn Pálmason	9	0	9
1	MF	(Norway)	10	Petter Vaagan Moen	7	2	9
3	FW	(Ivory Coast)	21	Moryké Fofana	6	2	8
4	MF	(Norway)	11	Erling Knudtzon	6	1	7
4	MF	(Norway)	17	Erik Mjelde	2	5	7
6	FW	(Norway)	9	Tommy Høiland	3	2	5
7	MF	(Norway)	16	Ohi Omoijuanfo	1	2	3
7	DF	(Norway)	20	Stian Ringstad	3	0	3
7	DF	(Norway)	13	Frode Kippe	3	0	3
7	MF	(Nigeria)	23	Fred Friday	3	0	3
11	MF	(Norway)	4	Ruben Gabrielsen	2	0	2
12	DF	(Norway)	15	Marius Lundemo	1	0	1
12				Own goal	1	0	1
				TOTALS	43	14	57

=== Disciplinary record ===
Number	Nation	Position	Name	Tippeligaen		Norwegian Cup		Total	
Number	Nation	Position	Name	Yellow card	Red card	Yellow card	Red card	Yellow card	Red card
3	(Norway)	DFF	Simen Kind Mikalsen	1	0	0	0	1	0
4	(Norway)	MF	Ruben Gabrielsen	3	0	0	0	3	0
7	(Sweden)	MF	Johan Andersson	2	0	0	0	2	0
8	(Norway)	MF	Bjørn Helge Riise	2	0	0	0	2	0
9	(Norway)	FW	Tommy Høiland	2	0	0	0	2	0
10	(Norway)	MF	Petter Vaagan Moen	1	0	0	0	1	0
11	(Norway)	MF	Erling Knudtzon	4	0	0	0	4	0
13	(Norway)	DF	Frode Kippe	2	0	0	0	2	0
14	(Iceland)	MF	Pálmi Rafn Pálmason	1	0	0	0	1	0
15	(Norway)	DF	Marius Lundemo	1	0	0	0	1	0
16	(Norway)	MF	Ohi Omoijuanfo	3	0	1	0	4	0
20	(Norway)	DF	Stian Ringstad	2	0	0	0	2	0
21	(Ivory Coast)	MF	Moryké Fofana	2	0	0	0	2	0
23	(Nigeria)	FW	Fred Friday	1	0	0	0	1	0
77	(Kenya)	GK	Arnold Origi	1	0	0	0	1	0
			TOTALS	28	0	1	0	29	0
