= List of Norwegian football transfers summer 2014 =

This is a list of Norwegian football transfers in the summer transfer window 2014 by club. Only clubs of the 2014 Norwegian Premier League are included. The window opened on 15 July and closed on 11 August 2014.

== 2014 Norwegian Premier League ==
=== Aalesund ===
In: Note: Flags indicate national team as defined under FIFA eligibility rules; some limited exceptions apply. Players may hold more than one non-FIFA nationality.

No.	Pos.	Nation	Player
24	DF	MAR	El Mehdi Karnass (from (Morocco) Difaa El Jadida)
30	FW	NOR	Mustafa Abdellaoue (from (Denmark) F.C. Copenhagen)

Out: Note: Flags indicate national team as defined under FIFA eligibility rules; some limited exceptions apply. Players may hold more than one non-FIFA nationality.

No.	Pos.	Nation	Player
11	FW	JAM	Tremaine Stewart (to unknown club (Jamaica))

=== Bodø/Glimt ===
In: Note: Flags indicate national team as defined under FIFA eligibility rules; some limited exceptions apply. Players may hold more than one non-FIFA nationality.

No.	Pos.	Nation	Player
8	MF	NOR	Daniel Berntsen (on loan from (Norway) Rosenborg)
29	DF	NOR	Vebjørn Walnum Vinje (from (Norway) Mo)

Out: Note: Flags indicate national team as defined under FIFA eligibility rules; some limited exceptions apply. Players may hold more than one non-FIFA nationality.

No.	Pos.	Nation	Player
9	FW	NOR	Jim Johansen (on loan to (Norway) Bryne)
29	FW	NOR	Erlend Robertsen (released)

=== Brann ===
In: Note: Flags indicate national team as defined under FIFA eligibility rules; some limited exceptions apply. Players may hold more than one non-FIFA nationality.

No.	Pos.	Nation	Player
4	MF	NOR	Eirik Birkelund (from (France) Saint-Étienne)
9	FW	NOR	Azar Karadas (from (Norway) Sogndal)
19	FW	NOR	Marcus Pedersen (from (Netherlands) Vitesse Arnhem)
-	DF	NOR	Henrik Gjesdal (loan return from (Norway) Nest-Sotra)

Out: Note: Flags indicate national team as defined under FIFA eligibility rules; some limited exceptions apply. Players may hold more than one non-FIFA nationality.

No.	Pos.	Nation	Player
19	MF	NOR	Kristoffer Larsen (on loan to (Norway) Hønefoss)
32	MF	NOR	Tomasz Sokolowski (to (Norway) Stabæk)
-	DF	NOR	Henrik Gjesdal (to (Norway) Tromsø)

=== Haugesund ===
In: Note: Flags indicate national team as defined under FIFA eligibility rules; some limited exceptions apply. Players may hold more than one non-FIFA nationality.

No.	Pos.	Nation	Player
4	DF	CRO	Mirko Kramarić (from (Croatia) Istra 1961)
6	MF	NGA	Emmanuel Ekpo (from (Norway) Molde)
9	FW	SRB	Nikola Komazec (from (South Korea) Busan)
—	DF	DEN	Henrik Kildentoft (loan return from (Norway) Hønefoss)

Out: Note: Flags indicate national team as defined under FIFA eligibility rules; some limited exceptions apply. Players may hold more than one non-FIFA nationality.

No.	Pos.	Nation	Player
5	MF	SVN	Rok Elsner (released)
6	MF	UGA	Tonny Mawejje (on loan to (Iceland) Valur)
—	DF	DEN	Henrik Kildentoft (released)

=== Lillestrøm ===
In: Note: Flags indicate national team as defined under FIFA eligibility rules; some limited exceptions apply. Players may hold more than one non-FIFA nationality.

No.	Pos.	Nation	Player
4	DF	NOR	Marius Amundsen (from (Norway) Strømmen)
9	FW	NOR	Amahl Pellegrino (from (Norway) Bærum)
12	GK	NOR	Jacob Faye-Lund (from (Norway) Fram Larvik)
18	MF	NGA	Bonke Innocent (from (Nigeria) Bojuc)
—	MF	NOR	Daniar Ali Mohammed (from (Norway) Strømsgodset)

Out: Note: Flags indicate national team as defined under FIFA eligibility rules; some limited exceptions apply. Players may hold more than one non-FIFA nationality.

No.	Pos.	Nation	Player
1	GK	NOR	Kenneth Udjus (to (Norway) Sogndal, on loan)
2	DF	NOR	Anders Østli (to (Denmark) FC Vestsjælland)
4	MF	NOR	Ruben Gabrielsen (to (Norway) Molde)
9	FW	NOR	Tommy Høiland (Loan return to (Norway) Molde)
19	FW	NOR	Kristoffer Ajer (to (Norway) Start)
—	FW	NOR	Joachim Osvold (on loan to (Finland) Turku)

=== Molde ===
In: Note: Flags indicate national team as defined under FIFA eligibility rules; some limited exceptions apply. Players may hold more than one non-FIFA nationality.

No.	Pos.	Nation	Player
4	MF	NOR	Ruben Gabrielsen (from (Norway) Lillestrøm)
20	FW	NOR	Tommy Høiland (loan ended at (Norway) Lillestrøm)
29	FW	ENG	John Cofie (from (England) Barnsley)

Out: Note: Flags indicate national team as defined under FIFA eligibility rules; some limited exceptions apply. Players may hold more than one non-FIFA nationality.

No.	Pos.	Nation	Player
6	MF	NGA	Emmanuel Ekpo (to (Norway) Haugesund)
10	MF	NOR	Magne Hoseth (to (Norway) Stabæk)
20	DF	NOR	Even Hovland (to (Germany) 1. FC Nürnberg)
33	MF	NOR	Andreas Hollingen (on loan to (Norway) HamKam)
—	GK	NOR	Ola Herman Opheim (to (Norway) Kristiansund)
—	DF	NOR	Victor Johansen (to (Norway) Lyn)
—	DF	NOR	Ørjan Valstrand (to (Norway) Byåsen)
—	DF	NOR	Ivar Erlien Furu (on loan to (Norway) Ranheim)

=== Odd ===
In: Note: Flags indicate national team as defined under FIFA eligibility rules; some limited exceptions apply. Players may hold more than one non-FIFA nationality.

No.	Pos.	Nation	Player
3	MF	NOR	Ardian Gashi (from (Sweden) Helsingborg)
19	FW	NOR	Snorre Krogsgård (from (Norway) Fram)

Out: Note: Flags indicate national team as defined under FIFA eligibility rules; some limited exceptions apply. Players may hold more than one non-FIFA nationality.

No.	Pos.	Nation	Player
5	DF	NOR	Fredrik Semb Berge (to (Denmark) Brøndby)
15	MF	NOR	Elbasan Rashani (to (Denmark) Brøndby)

=== Rosenborg ===
In: Note: Flags indicate national team as defined under FIFA eligibility rules; some limited exceptions apply. Players may hold more than one non-FIFA nationality.

No.	Pos.	Nation	Player
21	FW	SVK	Tomas Malec (from (Slovakia) Trenčín)
25	DF	ISL	Hólmar Örn Eyjólfsson (from (Germany) VfL Bochum)
31	MF	NOR	Bent Sørmo (from own youth team)
-	FW	DEN	Emil Nielsen (from (Denmark) Roskilde, from 1 Jan 2015)

Out: Note: Flags indicate national team as defined under FIFA eligibility rules; some limited exceptions apply. Players may hold more than one non-FIFA nationality.

No.	Pos.	Nation	Player
2	DF	CRC	Cristian Gamboa (to (England) W.B.A.)
10	FW	NGA	John Chibuike (to (Turkey) Gaziantepspor)
14	FW	DEN	Nicki Bille Nielsen (to (France) Evian)
18	MF	NOR	Daniel Berntsen (on loan to (Norway) Bodø/Glimt)

=== Sandnes Ulf ===
In: Note: Flags indicate national team as defined under FIFA eligibility rules; some limited exceptions apply. Players may hold more than one non-FIFA nationality.

No.	Pos.	Nation	Player
10	FW	CRC	Randall Brenes (on loan from (Costa Rica) Cartaginés)
15	FW	ISL	Hannes Sigurdsson (from (Austria) Grödig)
—	DF	ISL	Eiður Sigurbjörnsson (on loan from (Sweden) Örebro)

Out: Note: Flags indicate national team as defined under FIFA eligibility rules; some limited exceptions apply. Players may hold more than one non-FIFA nationality.

No.	Pos.	Nation	Player
10	FW	SCO	Steven Lennon (to (Iceland) FH)
36	FW	NOR	Birk Risa (to (Germany) 1. FC Köln)

=== Sarpsborg 08 ===
In: Note: Flags indicate national team as defined under FIFA eligibility rules; some limited exceptions apply. Players may hold more than one non-FIFA nationality.

No.	Pos.	Nation	Player
1	GK	NOR	Gudmund Kongshavn (on loan from (Norway) Vålerenga)
6	DF	GER	Jérome Polenz (from (Australia) Western Sydney Wanderers)
10	FW	CRC	Alejandro Castro (on loan from (Norway) Start)
21	FW	DEN	Oliver Feldballe (from (Netherlands) Cambuur)
—	GK	ISL	Haraldur Björnsson (loan return from (Norway) Strømmen)

Out: Note: Flags indicate national team as defined under FIFA eligibility rules; some limited exceptions apply. Players may hold more than one non-FIFA nationality.

No.	Pos.	Nation	Player
5	MF	ISL	Þórarinn Ingi Valdimarsson (to (Iceland) IBV)
6	FW	NOR	Christian Brink (to (Norway) Stord)
19	FW	CIV	Franck Dja Djédjé (to (Belarus) Dinamo Minsk)
99	FW	NGA	Aaron Samuel (to (China) Guangzhou)
—	GK	ISL	Haraldur Björnsson (to (Sweden) Östersunds FK)

=== Sogndal ===
In: Note: Flags indicate national team as defined under FIFA eligibility rules; some limited exceptions apply. Players may hold more than one non-FIFA nationality.

No.	Pos.	Nation	Player
12	GK	NOR	Kenneth Udjus (on loan from (Norway) Lillestrøm)
14	DF	SWE	Tom Söderberg (on loan from (Sweden) Elfsborg)
16	MF	SEN	Babacar Sarr (from (Norway) Start)
17	DF	FRA	Christophe Psyché (from (Norway) HamKam)
19	FW	NGA	Edward Ofere (on free transfer)

Out: Note: Flags indicate national team as defined under FIFA eligibility rules; some limited exceptions apply. Players may hold more than one non-FIFA nationality.

No.	Pos.	Nation	Player
9	FW	NOR	Azar Karadas (to (Norway) Brann)
10	MF	NOR	Ørjan Hopen (on loan to (Norway) Nest-Sotra)
11	FW	NOR	Martin Trøen (to (Norway) HamKam)
17	DF	NOR	Gustav Valsvik (to (Norway) Strømsgodset)
26	GK	SWE	Erik Dahlin (to (Sweden) IFK Trollhättan)
27	MF	NOR	Kristoffer Nesse Stephensen (on loan to (Norway) Fyllingsdalen)

=== Start ===
In: Note: Flags indicate national team as defined under FIFA eligibility rules; some limited exceptions apply. Players may hold more than one non-FIFA nationality.

No.	Pos.	Nation	Player
4	MF	NGA	Seyi Olofinjana (on free transfer)
19	MF	NOR	Kristoffer Ajer (from (Norway) Lillestrøm)

Out: Note: Flags indicate national team as defined under FIFA eligibility rules; some limited exceptions apply. Players may hold more than one non-FIFA nationality.

No.	Pos.	Nation	Player
4	DF	AUT	Markus Berger (to (Russia) Ural)
6	MF	SEN	Babacar Sarr (to (Norway) Sogndal)
11	FW	CRC	Alejandro Castro (on loan to (Norway) Sandnes Ulf)
-	MF	NOR	Robert Våge Skårdal (to (Norway) Fløy)

=== Stabæk ===
In: Note: Flags indicate national team as defined under FIFA eligibility rules; some limited exceptions apply. Players may hold more than one non-FIFA nationality.

No.	Pos.	Nation	Player
3	DF	NOR	Morten Skjønsberg (from (Sweden) IFK Norrköping)
7	MF	USA	Andrew Jacobson (on loan from (United States) New York City FC)
9	MF	GEO	Giorgi Gorozia (from (Georgia (country)) Lokomotivi Tbilisi)
16	MF	NOR	Magne Hoseth (from (Norway) Molde)
22	GK	IND	Gurpreet Singh Sandhu (from (India) East Bengal)
32	MF	NOR	Tomasz Sokolowski (from (Norway) Brann)

Out: Note: Flags indicate national team as defined under FIFA eligibility rules; some limited exceptions apply. Players may hold more than one non-FIFA nationality.

No.	Pos.	Nation	Player
7	MF	GHA	Enoch Adu (to (Sweden) Malmö)
16	MF	NOR	Morten Thorsby (to (Netherlands) Heerenveen)
29	DF	ARG	Pablo Fontanello (to (Russia) Ural)

=== Strømsgodset ===
In: Note: Flags indicate national team as defined under FIFA eligibility rules; some limited exceptions apply. Players may hold more than one non-FIFA nationality.

No.	Pos.	Nation	Player
3	DF	USA	Jeb Brovsky (on loan from (United States) New York City FC)
7	MF	DEN	Bassel Jradi (from (Denmark) Nordsjælland)
18	MF	GHA	Divine Naah (on loan from (England) Manchester City)
44	DF	MKD	Stefan Aškovski (on loan from (Serbia) Partizan)
71	DF	NOR	Gustav Valsvik (from (Norway) Sogndal)
75	FW	BEL	Marvin Ogunjimi (from (Spain) Mallorca)

Out: Note: Flags indicate national team as defined under FIFA eligibility rules; some limited exceptions apply. Players may hold more than one non-FIFA nationality.

No.	Pos.	Nation	Player
3	DF	NOR	Lars Sætra (to (Sweden) Hammarby)
7	FW	NOR	Muhamed Keita (to (Poland) Lech Poznań)
8	MF	POR	Francisco Júnior (end of loan from (England) Everton)
17	FW	NOR	Thomas Lehne Olsen (on loan to (Norway) Ull/Kisa)
25	MF	NOR	Tokmac Nguen (on loan to (Norway) Bærum)
34	GK	BIH	Sead Ramović (resigned)
—	MF	NOR	Daniar Ali Mohammed (to (Norway) Lillestrøm)

=== Viking ===
In: Note: Flags indicate national team as defined under FIFA eligibility rules; some limited exceptions apply. Players may hold more than one non-FIFA nationality.

No.	Pos.	Nation	Player

Out: Note: Flags indicate national team as defined under FIFA eligibility rules; some limited exceptions apply. Players may hold more than one non-FIFA nationality.

No.	Pos.	Nation	Player

=== Vålerenga ===
In: Note: Flags indicate national team as defined under FIFA eligibility rules; some limited exceptions apply. Players may hold more than one non-FIFA nationality.

No.	Pos.	Nation	Player
—	MF	NOR	Mattias Totland (from (Norway) Fana)
—	DF	NOR	Max Bjørsvik (on loan from (Norway) Nest-Sotra)

Out: Note: Flags indicate national team as defined under FIFA eligibility rules; some limited exceptions apply. Players may hold more than one non-FIFA nationality.

No.	Pos.	Nation	Player
22	MF	CRC	Diego Calvo (on loan to (Sweden) IFK Göteborg)
23	MF	NOR	Kristofer Hæstad (retired)
34	GK	NOR	Gudmund Kongshavn (on loan to (Norway) Sarpsborg 08)
—	FW	NOR	Riki Alba (on loan to (Norway) Nest-Sotra)
