= Fred Friday =

Nigerian footballer (born 1995)

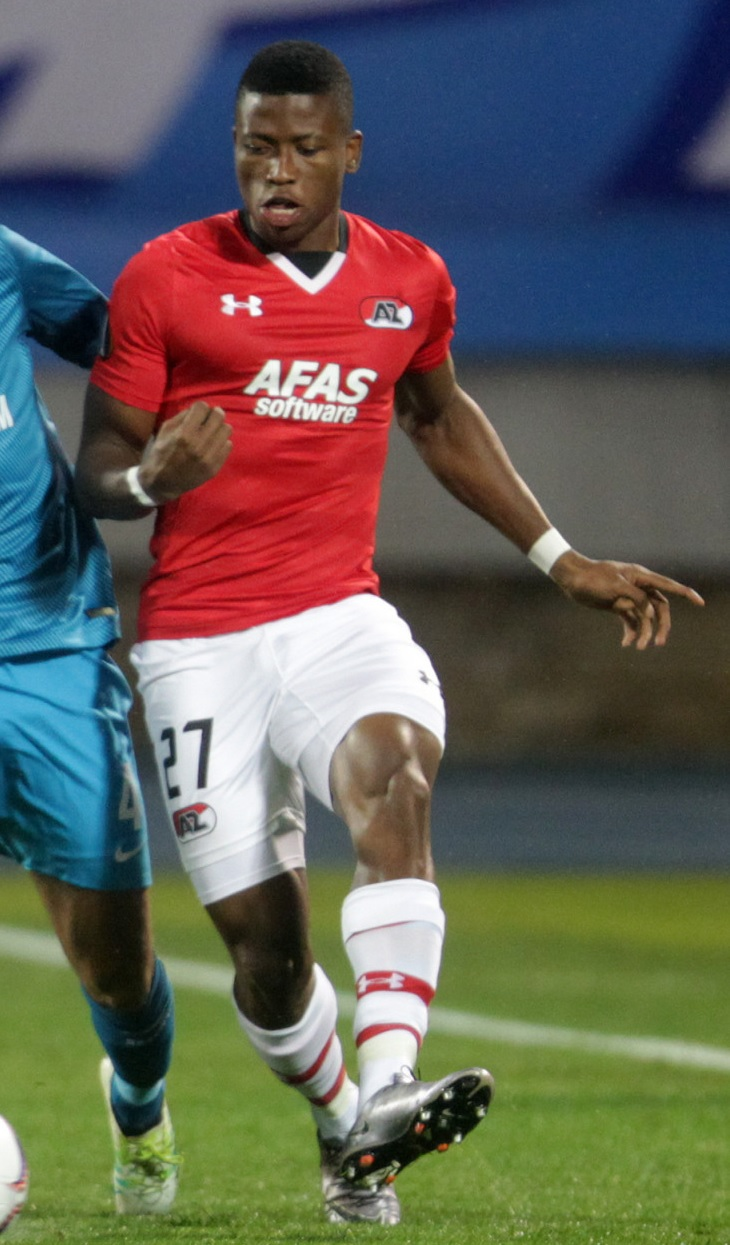
- Friday with AZ in 2016

Personal information
- Full name: Imoh Fred Friday
- Date of birth: 20 May 1995 (age 31)
- Place of birth: Port Harcourt, Nigeria
- Height: 1.87 m (6 ft 2 in)
- Position: Striker

Team information
- Current team: Ninh Binh
- Number: 5

Youth career
- Unicem Rovers
- Gabros FC
- –2013: BUJOC Sports Academy

Senior career*
Years	Team	Apps	(Gls)
2015–2016	Lillestrøm	57	(22)
2016–2020	AZ	28	(7)
2016–2018	Jong AZ	10	(11)
2018	→ Sparta Rotterdam (loan)	14	(4)
2019	→ FC Twente (loan)	11	(0)
2021–2022	Strømsgodset	38	(9)
2023–2024	Beitar Jerusalem	40	(4)
2025–2026	Haiphong	23	(7)
2026–	Ninh Binh	13	(2)
- * Club domestic league appearances and goals as of 7 June 2026

Imoh Fred Friday (born 20 May 1995) is a Nigerian professional footballer who plays as a striker for V.League 1 club Ninh Binh.

== Career ==
Born in Port Harcourt, Nigeria, Friday played youth football for Unicem Rovers, Gabros FC and BUJOC Sports Academy in the lower leagues of Nigeria. He left Nigeria for Norway in 2013, and at the age of 17 he spent three weeks on trial at Lillestrøm before he was signed on a permanent basis. Then-coach Magnus Haglund handed him just three appearances all season as the club flirted with relegation.

In July 2016, Friday moved from Lillestrøm to Eredivisie side AZ Alkmaar, on a four-year contract. He moved on loan to Sparta Rotterdam in January 2018.

He was released by AZ in January 2020.

On 29 January 2021, after being a free agent for a year, Friday returned to Norwegian football, signing a two-year contract with Strømsgodset where he was assigned the number 9 jersey.

In February 2023 he signed for Beitar Jerusalem.

On 23 May 2023, Friday scored a goal in the Israeli State Cup final.

On 2 February 2026, Friday moved from Haiphong to Ninh Binh, signing a two-year contract.

== Career statistics ==
As of 7 February 2026

Appearances and goals by club, season and competition
Club	Season	League			National Cup		Continental		Other		Total	
Club	Season	Division	Apps	Goals	Apps	Goals	Apps	Goals	Apps	Goals	Apps	Goals
Lillestrøm	2013	Tippeligaen	3	0	0	0	–		–		3	0
Lillestrøm	2014	Tippeligaen	16	3	3	0	–		–		19	3
Lillestrøm	2015	Tippeligaen	26	11	3	6	–		–		29	17
Lillestrøm	2016	Tippeligaen	14	8	0	0	–		–		14	8
Lillestrøm	Total		57	22	6	6	0	0	0	0	63	28
AZ	2016–17	Eredivisie	23	5	4	1	10	1	1	0	38	7
AZ	2017–18	Eredivisie	5	2	0	0	0	0	–		5	2
AZ	2018–19	Eredivisie	0	0	0	0	2	0	–		2	0
AZ	2019–20	Eredivisie	0	0	0	0	0	0	–		0	0
AZ	Total		28	7	4	1	12	1	1	0	45	9
Jong AZ	2016–17	Tweede Divisie	3	4	–		–		–		3	4
Jong AZ	2017–18	Eerste Divisie	7	7	–		–		–		7	7
Jong AZ	Total		10	11	0	0	0	0	0	0	10	11
Sparta Rotterdam (loan)	2017–18	Eredivisie	14	4	0	0	–		–		14	4
Twente (loan)	2018–19	Eerste Divisie	11	0	0	0	–		–		11	0
Strømsgodset	2021	Eliteserien	30	7	0	0	–		–		30	7
Strømsgodset	2022	Eliteserien	26	5	4	1	–		–		30	6
Strømsgodset	Total		56	12	4	1	–		–		60	13
Beitar Jerusalem	2022–23	Israeli Premier League	9	1	3	2	0	0	0	0	12	3
Beitar Jerusalem	2023–24	Israeli Premier League	31	3	1	0	0	0	1	1	33	4
Beitar Jerusalem	Total		40	4	4	2	–		1	1	45	7
Haiphong	2024–25	V.League 1	12	0	2	0	–		–		14	0
Haiphong	2025–26	V.League 1	11	7	1	0	–		–		12	7
Ninh Binh	2025–26	V.League 1	1	0	0	0	–		–		1	0
Ninh Binh	Total		27	7	3	0	–		–		27	7
Career total			240	67	21	10	12	1	2	1	275	79
