= Peter Wettergren =

Swedish footballer and manager

Personal information
- Full name: Peter Frank Vettergren
- Date of birth: 3 March 1968 (age 58)
- Place of birth: Ödeshög, Sweden
- Height: 1.87 m (6 ft 1 1/2 in)
- Position: Midfielder

Youth career
- 1979–1989: Ödeshög

Senior career*
Years	Team	Apps	(Gls)
1990–1991	Åtvidabergs FF		
1992–1997	Mjölby AI FF		

Managerial career
- 1997–1999: Ödeshög
- 1999–2004: Motala AIF
- 2005–2015: IF Elfsborg (assistant)
- 2015–2016: Copenhagen (assistant)
- 2016–2023: Sweden (assistant)
- 2025: Malmö FF (assistant)
- * Club domestic league appearances and goals

Peter Frank Vettergren (born 3 March 1968) is a Swedish former footballer who started his professional career with Åtvidabergs FF.

== Coaching career ==
Peter started his career coaching the local team of Ödeshög before he joined the first professional club Motala AIF in 1999, where in the very season the club was promoted from Division 4 to Division 3 league championship in his first full season with the club. He was then picked by the Allsvenskan club IF Elfsborg which plays in the Swedish top division football as assistant manager with Magnus Haglund, where he guided the team to win championship in 2006 Allsvenskan and qualify for first time to participate in the UEFA Champions League.

On 3 November 2011 after Magnus Haglund was asked to quit, the club director Stefan Andreasson confirmed that Peter will have a new key role for the club´s future and then in October 2013 IF Elfsborg offered Peter the role of the main manager at the club which he refused to accept. Peter will be playing the role of an assistant manager for the Sweden national team though he is officially designated as scout at present as confirmed by the Sweden national team manager Erik Hamrén

== Honours ==
=== Club ===
IF Elfsborg as Assistant Manager

  - Allsvenskan: 2006
- Swedish Champions:^{[B]}
  - Winners (2): 2006 and 2012
  - Runners-up (1): 2008

==== Cups ====
- Svenska Cupen:
  - Winners (1): 2013–2014
- Svenska Supercupen:
  - Winners (1): 2007

=== European ===
- UEFA Intertoto Cup:
  - Winners (1): 2008 (joint winner)
