= Malaury Martin =

French footballer (born 1988)

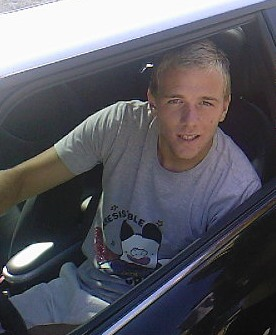
- Martin in 2008

Personal information
- Full name: Malaury Martin
- Date of birth: 25 August 1988 (age 38)
- Place of birth: Nice, France
- Position: Midfielder

Youth career
- 1994–1996: Saint-Sylvestre Nice
- 1996–2001: Nice
- 2001–2002: ES Fréjusienne
- 2002–2006: Monaco

Senior career*
Years	Team	Apps	(Gls)
2006–2010	Monaco	8	(0)
2008–2009	→ Nîmes (loan)	14	(0)
2010–2011	Blackpool	0	(0)
2011–2012	Middlesbrough	15	(3)
2013	Lausanne-Sport	12	(1)
2014–2015	Sandnes Ulf	20	(5)
2015–2017	Lillestrøm	41	(10)
2017–2019	Heart of Midlothian	14	(1)
2018	→ Dunfermline Athletic (loan)	9	(0)
2019–2021	Palermo	36	(1)
2021–2022	Casale	25	(1)
Total		194	(22)

International career
2008	France U21	1	(0)
- * Club domestic league appearances and goals as of 26 May 2021

Malaury Martin (born 25 August 1988) is a French former professional footballer who played as a midfielder.

Martin started his career with Ligue 1 side AS Monaco. He has since played for Nîmes, English clubs Blackpool and Middlesbrough, Swiss club Lausanne-Sport, Norwegian clubs Sandnes Ulf and Lillestrøm and Scottish clubs Hearts and Dunfermline.

Martin has played for France at six levels – under-15, under-16, under-17, under-18, under-19 and under-21. He played 47 games and scored 5 goals with the French youth teams, and was the captain from under-17 to under-21.

== Club career ==
=== AS Monaco ===
Martin, born in Nice, joined the Youth Teams of AS Monaco in 2000 and made his debut for Monaco in the 2005–06 Ligue 1 season, playing one game that year – a 2–2 draw with Nancy on 13 May 2006. Captain of the Reserve Team of AS Monaco, he was French Champion of Professional Reserve Teams in 2007/2008. He made eight appearances with the first team of AS Monaco in the 2007–08 season.

He was loaned out in the 2008–09 season to Ligue 2 side Nîmes Olympique. He made his debut on 12 September in a 1–0 home loss to Tours. He made a total of 14 appearances as Nîmes escaped relegation to the Championnat National by one point.

After his loan spell and return to Monaco, manager Guy Lacombe placed him in the reserves. In June 2010, Martyin went on trial at Major League Soccer side Chicago Fire and English Championship side Blackpool. It was announced on 29 July 2010 that his contract with the club had been terminated, with two years left on his contract.

=== Blackpool ===
In July 2010 he went on trial with newly promoted English Premier League side Blackpool, traveling with the squad to Devon to compete in the South West Challenge Cup pre-season tournament. And in the Seasiders' first game in the competition on 20 July, a 2–1 win over Accrington Stanley, he was named "Man of the Match". On 11 August, Martin signed a one-year contract with Blackpool; however, he failed to feature in the 2010–11 season. At the end of the same season he was released by Blackpool.

=== Middlesbrough ===
On 30 June 2011, Martin went on trial with Championship club Middlesbrough. He signed a one-year contract on 18 July. He made his competitive Middlesbrough debut against Leeds United in a 1–0 victory on 13 August 2011. He scored his first Middlesbrough goal in a 3–1 win over Birmingham City on 21 August 2011. Martin scored his second Boro goal of his Boro career on 3 December 2011, scoring a free-kick in the 90th minute in Middlesbrough's 1–0 win over Bristol City.

Martin scored his 3rd goal on 24 March 2012, scoring a powerful shot from outside the area in a 1–1 draw against Bristol City. After the match, Bristol City manager Derek McInnes claimed Martin had changed the game and described his goal as a "fantastic strike". Martin believed his performance gave him a chance to stay in the first team. At the end of the 2011–12 season, Martin was offered a new contract with the club. The proposed contract was not signed and the existing contract ended by 1 July 2012. After his release from Middlesbrough, Martin went on trial with Championship rivals Barnsley.

=== Lausanne-Sport ===
On 18 February 2013, Martin joined Swiss outfit Lausanne-Sport on a six-month deal. On 3 March 2013, Martin made his debut for the club, in a 1–1 draw against Grasshopper and on 3 May 2013, Martin scored his first goal for the club, in a 1–1 draw against Zürich. At the end of the season and after 12 games, he refused to sign a new contract.

=== Norway ===
After leaving Switzerland, Martin moved to Norwegian Tippeligaen club Sandnes on a two-year contract until 2015.

On 1 August 2015, Martin signed a one-and-a-half-year contract with Lillestrøm, tying him to the club until the end of 2016. He left the club when his contract expired on 1 January 2017.

=== Hearts ===
Martin signed a 3.5 year contract with Scottish Premiership club Hearts in January 2017. He made his debut for Hearts on 22 January 2017, against Raith Rovers in the Scottish Cup. Martin fell out of favour at Hearts after Craig Levein became manager in August 2017, and he was loaned to Dunfermline Athletic for part of the 2018–19 season. In January 2019 he agreed to shorten his contract with Hearts to November 2019 in order to facilitate a transfer, but this move did not materialise. Martin left Hearts by mutual consent in June 2019.

=== Palermo ===
In August 2019 he joined Palermo's training camp on trial.

After impressing on his trial period, he was awarded a new contract which he signed on his birthday, 25 August 2019. He won promotion to Serie C with the Rosanero and was confirmed for the club's 2020–21 Serie C season, where he played sporadically. He left Palermo by the end of the 2020–21 season following his contract expiration.

=== Casale and retirement ===
On 26 August 2021, Italian Serie D club Casale announced the signing of Martin as a free transfer. He left Casale by the end of the season.

On 11 October 2022, Martin announced his retirement from active football.

== International career ==
Martin captained France at every level from under-17s to under-21s. He played a total of 47 representative games and scored 5 goals. In the 2007 UEFA European Under-19 Football Championship, held in Austria, Martin scored two goals in the 5–2 group stage victory over Serbia, as the French reached the semi-finals. He was picked out on the UEFA website as being a "name to note" for the future, after his performances (2 goals and 3 assists) for France under-19s at the 2007 UEFA European Under-19 Football Championship, held in Austria, when it was said of him: "Always looks composed on the ball and never seemed to give away possession in the engine room of a French side that at their best were as good as any in the tournament. Equally adept at passing short and long, he is also a free-kick specialist – witness his effort against Serbia."

== Career statistics ==
=== Club ===
As of 26 May 2021

Appearances and goals by club, season and competition
Club	Season	League			National cup		Other		Total	
Club	Season	Division	Apps	Goals	Apps	Goals	Apps	Goals	Apps	Goals
Monaco	2005–06	Ligue 1	1	0	0	0	—		1	0
Monaco	2006–07	Ligue 1	0	0	0	0	—		0	0
Monaco	2007–08	Ligue 1	7	0	1	0	—		8	0
Monaco	2009–10	Ligue 1	0	0	0	0	—		0	0
Monaco	Total		8	0	1	0	0	0	9	0
Nîmes (loan)	2008–09	Ligue 2	14	0	2	0	—		16	0
Blackpool	2010–11	Premier League	0	0	0	0	—		0	0
Middlesbrough	2011–12	Championship	15	3	1+2 (Note: All appearance(s) in EFL Cup.)	0	—		18	3
Lausanne	2012–13	Swiss Super League	12	1	0	0	—		12	1
Lausanne	2013–14	Swiss Super League	0	0	0	0	—		0	0
Lausanne	Total		12	1	0	0	0	0	12	1
Sandnes Ulf	2014	Tippeligaen	5	1	0	0	—		5	1
Sandnes Ulf	2015	OBOS-ligaen	15	4	1	0	—		16	4
Sandnes Ulf	Total		20	5	1	0	0	0	21	5
Lillestrøm	2015	Tippeligaen	11	3	0	0	—		11	3
Lillestrøm	2016	Tippeligaen	30	7	3	0	—		33	7
Lillestrøm	Total		41	10	3	0	0	0	44	10
Heart of Midlothian	2016–17	Scottish Premiership	13	1	4 (Note: All appearance(s) in Scottish Cup.)	1	—		17	2
Heart of Midlothian	2017–18	Scottish Premiership	1	0	3 (Note: All appearance(s) in Scottish League Cup.)	0	—		4	0
Heart of Midlothian	Total		14	1	7	1	0	0	21	2
Dunfermline Athletic (loan)	2018–19	Scottish Championship	9	0	2 (Note: All appearance(s) in Scottish Challenge Cup.)	0	—		11	0
Palermo	2019–20	Serie D	24	1	0	0	—		24	1
Palermo	2020–21	Serie C	12	0	—		0	0	12	0
Palermo	Total		36	1	0	0	0	0	36	1
Casale	2021–22	Serie D	0	0	0	0	—		0	0
Career total			169	21	19	1	0	0	188	22
