= Bonke Innocent =

Nigerian footballer (born 1996)

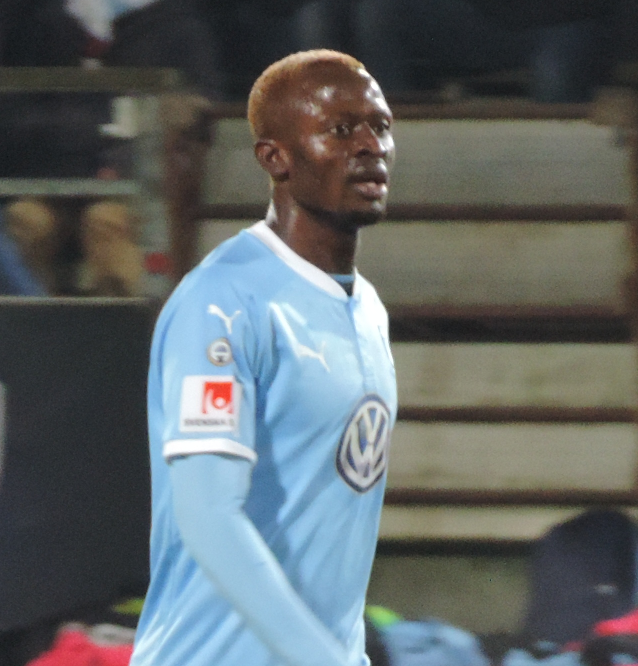
- Innocent with Malmö FF in 2018

Personal information
- Date of birth: 20 January 1996 (age 30)
- Place of birth: Kaduna, Nigeria
- Height: 1.79 m (5 ft 10 in)
- Position: Midfielder

Youth career
- Bujoc FC

Senior career*
Years	Team	Apps	(Gls)
2014–2017	Lillestrøm	54	(0)
2017–2021	Malmö FF	61	(0)
2022–2024	Lorient	41	(0)
2024–2025	Adanaspor	17	(1)

International career^{‡}
2021–	Nigeria	4	(0)
- * Club domestic league appearances and goals as of 7 March 2025 ‡ National team caps and goals as of 3 April 2025

Bonke Innocent (born 20 January 1996) is a Nigerian professional footballer who plays as a midfielder for the Nigeria national team.

== Club career ==
On 2 August 2017, Malmö FF announced the signing of Innocent on a contract until 2021 for a fee of €799,000.

Innocent was released by Malmö FF at the end of 2021, and he then signed a 3.5-year contract for Ligue 1 side FC Lorient.

== International career ==
Innocent made his debut for the Nigeria national team on 7 September 2021 in a World Cup qualifier against Cape Verde, a 2–1 away victory. He started and played the whole match.

== Career statistics ==
=== Club ===
As of match played 8 December 2021

Appearances and goals by club, season and competition
Club	Season	League			National Cup		Continental		Total	
Club	Season	Division	Apps	Goals	Apps	Goals	Apps	Goals	Apps	Goals
Lillestrøm	2014	Tippeligaen	1	0	0	0	–		1	0
Lillestrøm	2015	Tippeligaen	20	0	2	0	–		22	0
Lillestrøm	2016	Tippeligaen	24	0	2	0	–		26	0
Lillestrøm	2017	Tippeligaen	9	0	2	1	–		11	1
Lillestrøm	Total		54	0	6	1	0	0	60	1
Malmö FF	2017	Allsvenskan	2	0	0	0	0	0	2	0
Malmö FF	2018	Allsvenskan	15	0	1	0	5	0	21	0
Malmö FF	2019	Allsvenskan	11	0	1	0	6	0	18	0
Malmö FF	2020	Allsvenskan	16	0	2	0	1	0	19	0
Malmö FF	2021	Allsvenskan	17	0	1	0	13	0	31	0
Malmö FF	Total		61	0	5	0	25	0	91	0
Career total			115	0	11	1	25	0	151	1

== Honours ==
Malmö FF

- Allsvenskan: 2017, 2020, 2021
