= Emil Ødegaard =

Norwegian footballer (born 1994)

Personal information
- Full name: Emil Gundelach Ødegaard
- Date of birth: 29 April 1999 (age 27)
- Height: 1.86 m (6 ft 1 in)
- Position: Goalkeeper

Team information
- Current team: KFUM
- Number: 1

Youth career
- Skjetten
- 2007–2016: Lillestrøm

Senior career*
Years	Team	Apps	(Gls)
2015–2021	Lillestrøm	0	(0)
2017	→ Levanger	0	(0)
2018–2020	→ Grorud (loan)	52	(0)
2021	→ Stjørdals-Blink (loan)	10	(0)
2021–	KFUM	103	(0)

International career
2014	Norway U15	3	(0)
2015	Norway U16	8	(0)
2016	Norway U17	6	(0)
2017	Norway U18	8	(0)
2018	Norway U19	1	(0)
2019	Norway U20	1	(0)
2019	Norway U21	2	(0)
- * Club domestic league appearances and goals as of 12 July 2026

Emil Gundelach Ødegaard (born 29 April 1999) is a Norwegian footballer who plays as a goalkeeper for KFUM.

== Career ==
Ødegaard hails from Skjetten, and played briefly for Skjetten SK as a young child before joining regional powerhouse Lillestrøm SK at the age of 8. He won the Norwegian U16 Cup with Lillestrøm in 2015. Ødegaard was allowed on the bench for the senior team for the first time in April 2015, and featured more regularly on the bench in 2016. In July 2016, both Lillestrøm's goalkeepers Arnold Origi and Jacob Faye-Lund were unavailable, which could open the way for Ødegaard. However, the club chose to loan Pål Vestly Heigre instead.

Ødegaard continued as Lillestrøm's reserve goalkeeper until the summer of 2017, when he was sent on loan to Levanger FK. He did not play a single league match here either. In 2018 he was loaned out to Grorud IL, making his senior debut in the 2. divisjon. He was praised by coach Eirik Kjønø and Norway U19 coach Pål Arne Johansen for his abilities to distribute the ball with his feet; Ødegaard tried to emulate Manuel Neuer and Marc-André ter Stegen in that regard. Ødegaard was a squad member for the 2018 UEFA European Under-19 Championship, and was capped for every Norwegian youth national team.

The loan to Grorud lasted three seasons, and included a promotion to the 2020 1. divisjon. Here, he played against Lillestrøm for the first time in his life. In 2021 he was instead loaned out to Stjørdals-Blink. After four years out on loan, Ødegaard finally left Lillestrøm and signed for KFUM in the summer of 2021. He played regularly, but towards the end of the year, the coach preferred Jonas Brauti. In March 2022, Ødegaard ruptured his meniscus in a friendly match. It was reported that the injury would sideline him throughout 2022. He did return to play one match in the 2022 1. divisjon, keeping a clean sheet.

Ødegaard returned as undisputed first-choice for KFUM in the 2023 1. divisjon, a campaign that ended in promotion to Eliteserien for the first time in KFUM's history. Ødegaard kept 12 clean sheets. After winning promotion, Ødegaard could play football full-time. When playing on the second tier, Ødegaard was a part-time shop clerk in Vinmonopolet.

KFUM's 2024 Eliteserien season was marked by several victories over big clubs, the biggest being Rosenborg on away ground. Ødegaard was also injured, but did not miss any matches, after being kicked in the head by Bård Finne.
