= Michael Timisela =

Dutch footballer (born 1986)

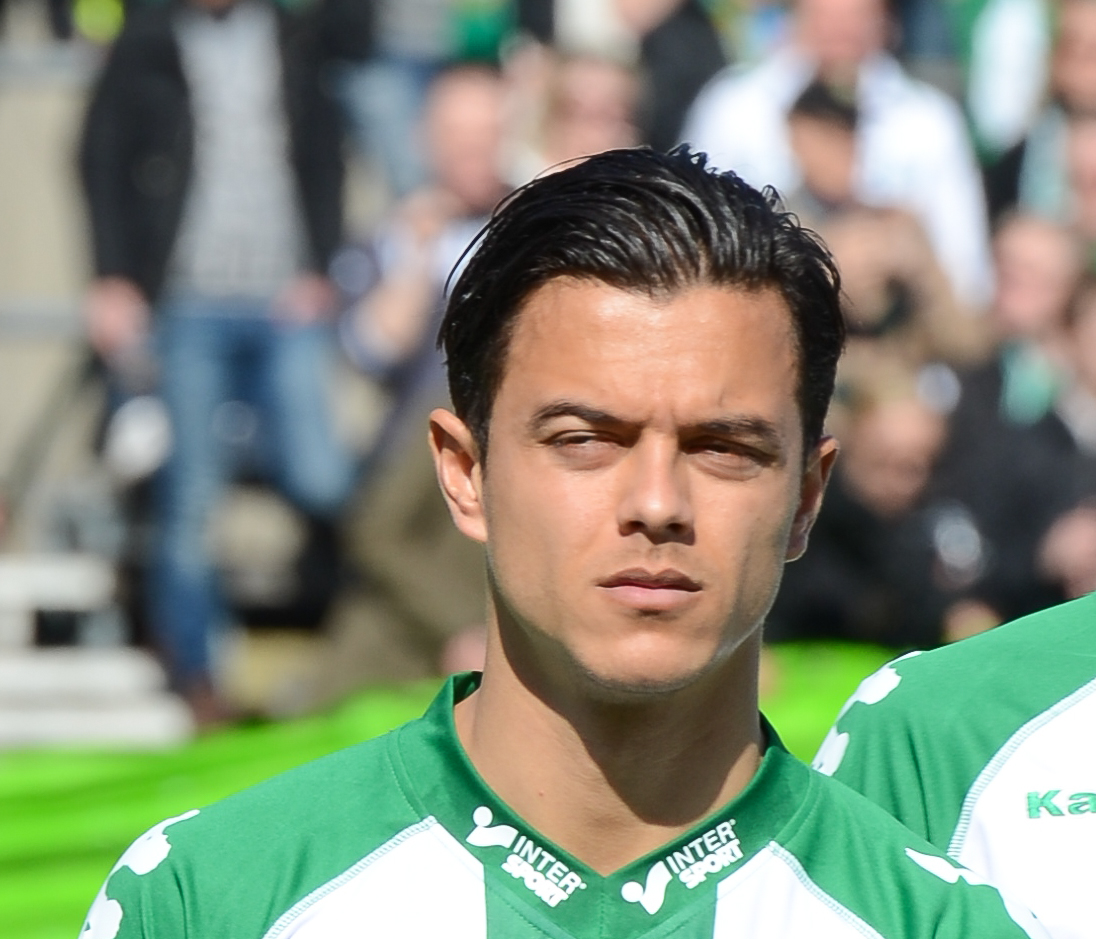

Personal information
- Full name: Michael Elias Timisela
- Date of birth: 5 May 1986 (age 40)
- Place of birth: Amsterdam, Netherlands
- Height: 1.76 m (5 ft 9 1/2 in)
- Position: Right back

Youth career
- 2001–2005: Ajax

Senior career*
Years	Team	Apps	(Gls)
2005–2007	Ajax	4	(1)
2007–2012	VVV-Venlo	111	(2)
2013–2014	Hammarby	47	(1)
2015	Lillestrøm	11	(0)
2016–2017	Koninklijke HFC	42	(3)
Total		215	(7)
- * Club domestic league appearances and goals as of 26 February 2018

Michael Elias Timisela (born 5 May 1986) is a Dutch former professional footballer who played as a right back.

== Career ==
Born in Amsterdam, Timisela has played for Ajax and VVV-Venlo. In December 2012, he signed a three-year contract with Swedish club Hammarby, to begin with the 2013 season. He was released by Hammarby at the end of the 2014 season. In May 2015 Lillestrøm SK announced at their official website that they had signed Timisela.

Timisela returned to the Netherlands to play for Koninklijke HFC in 2017. He announced his retirement from football in January 2018 to focus on a career in civil society.

== Personal life ==
He is of Indonesian descent.
