= Markus Brændsrød =

Norwegian footballer (born 1995)

Personal information
- Full name: Markus Dahlen Brændsrød
- Date of birth: 6 September 1995 (age 31)
- Place of birth: Tønsberg, Norway
- Height: 1.73 m (5 ft 8 in)
- Position: Winger

Team information
- Current team: Eik Tønsberg
- Number: 10

Youth career
- Tønsberg

Senior career*
Years	Team	Apps	(Gls)
2012–2013	Tønsberg	9	(1)
2014	Vålerenga	6	(0)
2015–2016	Lillestrøm	5	(0)
2016	→ Strømmen (loan)	28	(4)
2017	Strømmen	15	(1)
2017–2020	Sogndal	21	(2)
2019	→ Jerv (loan)	4	(0)
2021–	Eik Tønsberg	8	(4)
- * Club domestic league appearances and goals as of 07:03, 16 October 2021 (UTC)

Markus Dahlen Brændsrød (born 6 September 1995) is a Norwegian football midfielder who currently plays for Eik Tønsberg.

He started his youth career in FK Tønsberg, before being signed by Vålerenga. He played six first-tier games in 2014, but signed a two-year deal with Lillestrøm ahead of the 2015 season.

On 17 February 2016 he signed a loan deal with Strømmen.

== Career statistics ==
As of match played 26 September 2021

Appearances and goals by club, season and competition
Club	Season	League			National Cup		Europe		Total	
Club	Season	Division	Apps	Goals	Apps	Goals	Apps	Goals	Apps	Goals
Tønsberg	2012	2. divisjon	1	0	0	0	—		1	0
Tønsberg	2013	2. divisjon	8	1	0	0	—		8	1
Tønsberg	Total		9	1	0	0	—		9	1
Vålerenga	2014	Eliteserien	6	0	2	0	—		8	0
Lillestrøm	2015	Eliteserien	5	0	1	0	—		6	0
Strømmen (loan)	2016	1. divisjon	28	4	3	2	—		31	6
Strømmen	2017	1. divisjon	15	1	2	0	—		17	1
Sogndal	2017	Eliteserien	5	0	0	0	—		5	0
Sogndal	2018	1. divisjon	3	0	0	0	—		3	0
Sogndal	2019	1. divisjon	0	0	0	0	—		0	0
Sogndal	2020	1. divisjon	13	2	0	0	—		13	2
Sogndal	Total		21	2	0	0	—		12	2
Jerv (loan)	2019	1. divisjon	4	0	1	0	—		5	0
Eik Tønsberg	2021	3. divisjon	8	4	1	0	—		9	4
Career total			96	12	10	2	0	0	106	14
