= Marius Lundemo =

Norwegian footballer (born 1994)

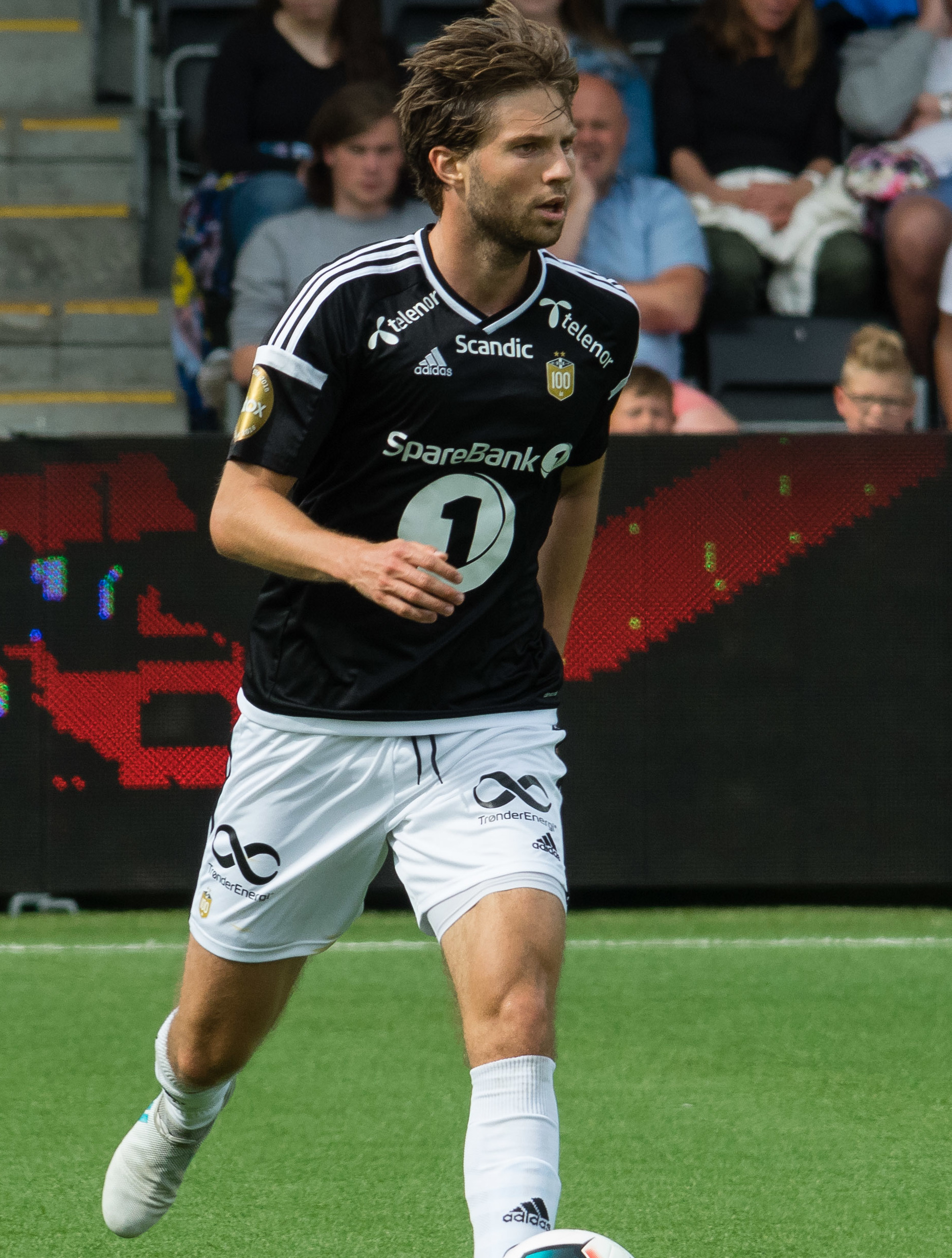

Personal information
- Full name: Marius Lundemo
- Date of birth: 11 April 1994 (age 32)
- Place of birth: Bærum, Norway
- Height: 1.89 m (6 ft 2 1/2 in)
- Position: Defensive midfielder

Team information
- Current team: Stabæk
- Number: 19

Youth career
- Bærum

Senior career*
Years	Team	Apps	(Gls)
2010–2013	Bærum	35	(11)
2014–2016	Lillestrøm	60	(5)
2017–2020	Rosenborg	64	(4)
2020–2022	APOEL	39	(1)
2022–2024	Lillestrøm	31	(2)
2025	Valur	17	(0)
2026–	Stabæk	11	(0)
- * Club domestic league appearances and goals as of 14 November 2026

Marius Lundemo (born 11 April 1994) is a Norwegian professional footballer who plays as a defensive midfielder for Stabæk.

== Club career ==
=== Bærum ===
He started his career in Bærum SK. He made his senior debut in a friendly match in March 2010. He then made his league debut in late 2010. Ahead of the 2011 season he was officially drafted into the first team. He started his first match in August 2011.

=== Lillestrøm ===
Ahead of the 2014 season, Lundemo transferred to the first-tier club Lillestrøm. He made his league debut for Lillestrøm in March 2014 against Haugesund. After the 2016 season Lundemo opted to leave Lillestrøm with his contract expiring at the end of the year.

=== Rosenborg ===
In December 2016, Lundemo signed for Rosenborg.

=== APOEL ===
In June 2020, Lundemo signed for APOEL starting from 1 August when his contract with Rosenborg expires.

=== Valur ===
In March 2025, Lundemo signed for Valur starting from 10 March, signed as a free agent for the Icelandic giants.

=== Stabæk ===
Lundemo signed for Norwegian side Stabæk on 2 March 2026.

== Career statistics ==
As of match played 14 November 2026

Appearances and goals by club, season and competition
Club	Season	League			National Cup		Europe		Total	
Club	Season	Division	Apps	Goals	Apps	Goals	Apps	Goals	Apps	Goals
Bærum	2012	1. divisjon	9	1	2	0	-		11	1
Bærum	2013	2. divisjon	26	10	1	0	-		27	10
Bærum	Total		35	11	3	0	-	-	38	11
Lillestrøm	2014	Eliteserien	26	2	4	0	-		30	2
Lillestrøm	2015	Eliteserien	15	1	0	0	-		15	1
Lillestrøm	2016	Eliteserien	19	2	2	0	-		21	2
Lillestrøm	Total		60	5	6	0	-	-	66	5
Rosenborg	2017	Eliteserien	18	0	4	0	5	0	27	0
Rosenborg	2018	Eliteserien	16	2	2	1	11	0	29	3
Rosenborg	2019	Eliteserien	22	1	1	0	13	0	36	1
Rosenborg	2020	Eliteserien	8	1	-		0	0	8	1
Rosenborg	Total		64	4	7	1	29	0	100	5
APOEL	2020–21	First Division	27	1	5	0	2	0	34	1
APOEL	2021–22	First Division	12	0	1	0	0	0	13	0
APOEL	Total		39	1	6	0	2	0	47	1
Lillestrøm	2022	Eliteserien	3	0	0	0	-		3	0
Lillestrøm	2023	Eliteserien	16	0	0	0	-		16	0
Lillestrøm	2024	Eliteserien	12	2	1	1	-		13	3
Lillestrøm	Total		31	2	1	1	-	-	32	3
Valur	2025	Besta deild	17	0	3	0	-		20	0
Valur	Total		17	0	3	0	-	-	20	0
Stabæk	2026	1. divisjon	11	0	0	0	-		11	0
Stabæk	Total		11	0	0	0	-	-	11	0
Career total			257	23	26	2	31	0	314	25

== Honours ==
=== Club ===
Rosenborg

- Eliteserien (2): 2017, 2018
- Norwegian Cup (1): 2018
