= Jørgen Kolstad =

Norwegian footballer (born 1995)

Personal information
- Date of birth: 31 August 1995 (age 31)
- Height: 1.79 m (5 ft 10 in)
- Position: Midfielder

Team information
- Current team: Eidsvold Turn
- Number: 27

Youth career
- Søndre Høland
- –2014: Lillestrøm

Senior career*
Years	Team	Apps	(Gls)
2014–2017	Lillestrøm	41	(4)
2017	→ Kongsvinger (loan)	21	(0)
2018	Kongsvinger	9	(1)
2018–2019	Søndre Høland		
2020–	Eidsvold Turn	33	(5)
- * Club domestic league appearances and goals as of 14 May 2022

Jørgen Kolstad (born 31 August 1995) is a Norwegian football midfielder who plays for Eidsvold Turn.
