= Simen Nordermoen =

Norwegian footballer (born 1995)

Personal information
- Date of birth: 26 June 1995 (age 31)
- Height: 1.74 m (5 ft 9 in)
- Position: Defender

Youth career
- –2009: Fjellhamar
- 2012: Lillestrøm

Senior career*
Years	Team	Apps	(Gls)
2010–2011	Fjellhamar		
2013–2015	Lillestrøm	1	(0)

International career^{‡}
2012	Norway U-17	2	(0)
2014	Norway U-19	2	(0)
- * Club domestic league appearances and goals as of 8 March 2016 ‡ National team caps and goals as of 5 April 2014

Simen Nordermoen (born 26 June 1995) is a Norwegian football defender who currently is a free agent.

He started his career in Fjellhamar FK, where he made his 3. divisjon debut already in 2010. Ahead of the 2012 season he signed for Lillestrøm's B team. He made his senior debut in the Norwegian Premier League in a 1-7 loss to Aalesund in May 2013.

== Career statistics ==
Season	Club	Division	League		Cup		Total	
Season	Club	Division	Apps	Goals	Apps	Goals	Apps	Goals
2012	Lillestrøm	Tippeligaen	0	0	0	0	0	0
2013	Lillestrøm	Tippeligaen	1	0	0	0	1	0
2014	Lillestrøm	Tippeligaen	0	0	1	0	1	0
2015	Lillestrøm	Tippeligaen	0	0	0	0	0	0
Career Total			1	0	1	0	2	0
