= Magnus Haglund =

Swedish footballer and manager

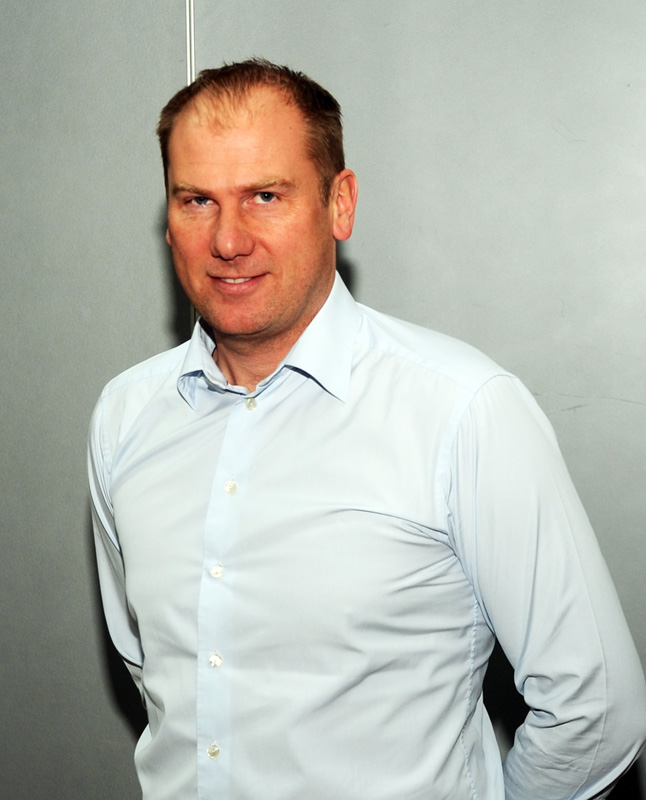

Personal information
- Date of birth: 23 May 1973 (age 53)
- Place of birth: Halmstad, Sweden
- Position: Goalkeeper

Youth career
- Halmstads BK

Senior career*
Years	Team	Apps	(Gls)
- Halmstads BK
1992	Karlslunds IF		
1993–1994	IK Sturehov		
1995–1996	Tri-State University		

Managerial career
- 1998–1999: Stafsinge IF
- 2000–2003: Laholms FK
- 2004–2011: IF Elfsborg
- 2012–2014: Lillestrøm SK
- 2015–2017: IF Elfsborg
- 2019–2024: Halmstads BK
- * Club domestic league appearances and goals

Magnus Haglund (born 15 April 1973) is a Swedish football coach and former player. He is currently unemployed after being sacked at Halmstads BK. He has previously managed IF Elfsborg and Lillestrøm SK, having signed a two-year contract starting in January 2012. In 2006, he led IF Elfsborg to its first league title in 45 years with Peter Wettergren.

== Honours ==
=== Manager ===
IF Elfsborg

- Allsvenskan: 2006
