= Joachim Osvold =

Norwegian footballer (born 1994)

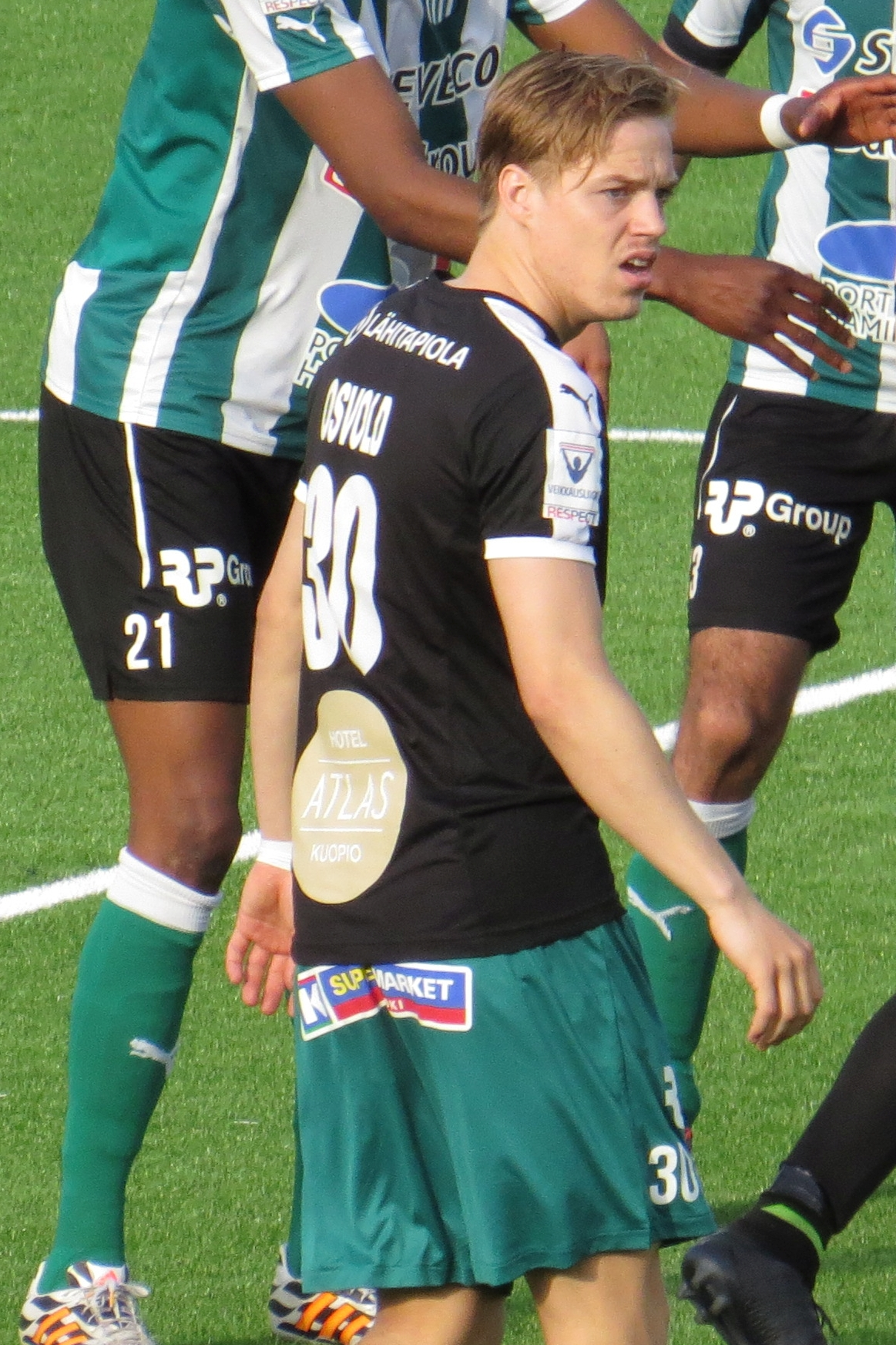
- Osvold with KuPS in 2015

Personal information
- Full name: Joachim Osvold
- Date of birth: 23 September 1994 (age 32)
- Height: 1.88 m (6 ft 2 in)
- Position: Striker

Youth career
- –2008: Lillestrøm
- 2009: Skedsmo
- 2010: Oppsal
- 2011: Lillestrøm

Senior career*
Years	Team	Apps	(Gls)
2012–2015	Lillestrøm	6	(0)
2014	→ TPS (loan)	11	(3)
2015	→ KuPS (loan)	10	(0)
2016	Rot-Weiss Essen	5	(0)
2016–2017	Bodø/Glimt	7	(2)
2017	Levanger	13	(2)
2018–2019	Hødd	29	(2)
2021–2022	Fet		

International career
2012	Norway U18	2	(0)
- * Club domestic league appearances and goals

Joachim Osvold (born 23 September 1994) is a Norwegian footballer who played as a striker.

A son of former Lillestrøm player Kjetil Osvold, he started in Lillestrøm too but also played youth football in Skedsmo and Oppsal. Ahead of the 2011 season he joined Lillestrøm's B team. He made his senior debut in the Norwegian Premier League in May 2012. He left Lillestrøm at the end of 2015 season after his contract was not renewed.

He joined Rot-Weiss Essen in February 2016 after training with the club for two weeks.

In late July he joined Bodø/Glimt and signed a one-year contract with the club.

After finishing his elite career with IL Hødd in 2019, he started playing on the lower tiers. The tiers below the third were cancelled in 2020 due to the COVID-19 pandemic, but Osvold played in the Fifth Division in 2021 and 2022 for Fet IL.

== Career statistics ==
=== Club ===
As of match played 6 October 2019

Appearances and goals by club, season and competition
Club	Season	League			National Cup		Europe		Total	
Club	Season	Division	Apps	Goals	Apps	Goals	Apps	Goals	Apps	Goals
Lillestrøm	2012	Tippeligaen	3	0	0	0	-		3	0
Lillestrøm	2013	Tippeligaen	2	0	1	0	-		3	0
Lillestrøm	2014	Tippeligaen	0	0	1	0	-		1	0
Lillestrøm	2015	Tippeligaen	1	0	1	1	-		2	1
Lillestrøm	Total		6	0	3	1	-	-	9	1
TPS (loan)	2015	Veikkausliiga	11	3	0	0	-		11	3
KuPS (loan)	2016	Veikkausliiga	10	0	0	0	-		10	0
Rot-Weiss Essen	2015–16	Regionalliga West	5	0	0	0	-		5	0
Bodø/Glimt	2016	Tippeligaen	1	0	1	1	-		2	1
Bodø/Glimt	2017	1. divisjon	6	2	3	3	-		9	5
Bodø/Glimt	Total		7	2	4	4	-	-	11	6
Levanger	2017	1. divisjon	13	2	0	0	-		13	2
Hødd	2018	2. divisjon	24	2	4	1	-		28	3
Hødd	2019	2. divisjon	5	0	1	0	-		6	0
Hødd	Total		29	2	5	1	-	-	34	3
Career total			81	9	12	6	-	-	93	15
