= Marius Amundsen =

Norwegian football defender (born 1992)

Personal information
- Full name: Marius Ørjasæter Amundsen
- Date of birth: 22 September 1992 (age 34)
- Place of birth: Lørenskog, Norway
- Height: 1.85 m (6 ft 1 in)
- Position: Defender

Team information
- Current team: Skjetten

Youth career
- 2006–2011: Lillestrøm

Senior career*
Years	Team	Apps	(Gls)
2012–2014	Strømmen	69	(4)
2014–2018	Lillestrøm	120	(1)
2020	Lillestrøm	22	(0)
2021–	Skjetten	12	(0)
- * Club domestic league appearances and goals as of 25 October 2021

Marius Amundsen (born 22 September 1992) is a Norwegian football defender who plays for Skjetten.

== Career ==
Amundsen started his career with Lillestrøm before joining Strømmen IF in 2012.

In July 2014 he left Strømmen and returned to Lillestrøm. His first team debut came against Aalesund in July 2014, in a match that ended in a 1-1 draw.

In the summer of 2021 he joined fifth-tier Skjetten SK.

== Career statistics ==
As of 12 November 2020

Season	Club	Division	League		Cup		Total	
Season	Club	Division	Apps	Goals	Apps	Goals	Apps	Goals
2011	Lillestrøm	Eliteserien	0	0	1	0	1	0
2012	Strømmen	Norwegian First Division	24	0	2	0	26	0
2013	Strømmen	Norwegian First Division	29	1	0	0	29	1
2014	Strømmen	Norwegian First Division	16	3	3	0	19	3
2014	Lillestrøm	Eliteserien	14	1	1	0	15	1
2015	Lillestrøm	Eliteserien	30	0	3	0	33	0
2016	Lillestrøm	Eliteserien	29	0	3	0	32	0
2017	Lillestrøm	Eliteserien	28	0	7	0	35	0
2018	Lillestrøm	Eliteserien	25	0	5	0	30	0
2020	Lillestrøm	Norwegian First Division	22	0	–		22	0
Career Total			217	5	25	0	232	5

== Honours ==
Lillestrøm

- Norwegian Football Cup (1): 2017
