= Jacob Faye-Lund =

Norwegian footballer (born 1994)

Personal information
- Full name: Jacob Rekdahl Faye-Lund
- Date of birth: 15 September 1994 (age 32)
- Position: Goalkeeper

Team information
- Current team: Oppsal
- Number: 30

Youth career
- Oppsal
- 2011: Vålerenga

Senior career*
Years	Team	Apps	(Gls)
2012–2013	Lillestrøm	3	(0)
2013	Fram Larvik	11	(0)
2014–2016	Lillestrøm	7	(0)
2018–	Oppsal	9	(0)
- * Club domestic league appearances and goals as of 21 July 2018

Jacob Faye-Lund (born 15 September 1994) is a Norwegian football goalkeeper who plays for Oppsal.

He played for Oppsal in his early career, and joined Lillestrøm's B team from Vålerenga's youth team ahead of the 2012 season. He made his senior debut in the Norwegian Premier League as a substitute in a 3-0 victory against Strømsgodset in April 2012. He became Lillestrøm's youngest goalkeeper in the club's first-tier history.

Early August 2013, he signed for Fram Larvik. He made his debut 11 August 2013 against Odd 2, winning the match 9-0.

Following a hiatus from football in 2017 he rejoined Oppsal in 2018, helping the team lead the 2018 3. divisjon campaign.

== Career statistics ==
Season	Club	Division	League		Cup		Total	
Season	Club	Division	Apps	Goals	Apps	Goals	Apps	Goals
2012	Lillestrøm	Tippeligaen	2	0	1	0	3	0
2013	Lillestrøm	Tippeligaen	1	0	0	0	1	0
2013	Fram Larvik	2. divisjon	11	0	0	0	11	0
2014	Lillestrøm	Tippeligaen	0	0	0	0	0	0
2015	Lillestrøm	Tippeligaen	0	0	1	0	1	0
2016	Lillestrøm	Tippeligaen	4	0	1	0	3	0
Career Total			18	0	3	0	21	0

== Personal life ==
He is the older brother of fellow goalkeeper Julian Faye Lund.
