= Kygo Jo =

"Kygo Jo (Kygo Remix)"

Single by Kygo, Flow Kingz and JMK featuring Lyng
- Language: Norwegian
- Released: 7 July 2026
- Recorded: 2016
- Genre: Hip-hop; house; dance
- Length: 2:33
- Label: Sony
- Composer: Kyrre Gørvell-Dahll
- Producer: Kygo

Kygo singles chronology
"Heaven on Your Mind" (2026)	"Kygo Jo (Kygo Remix)" (2026)	"Take Me Back" (2026)

"Kygo Jo" is a song by Norwegian hip hop group Flow Kingz featuring Norwegian rapper and footballer Erling Haaland under the pseudonym Lyng, released in 2016. Norwegian producer Kygo made a remix of the song for the 2026 FIFA World Cup on July 7, 2026.

== Original version ==
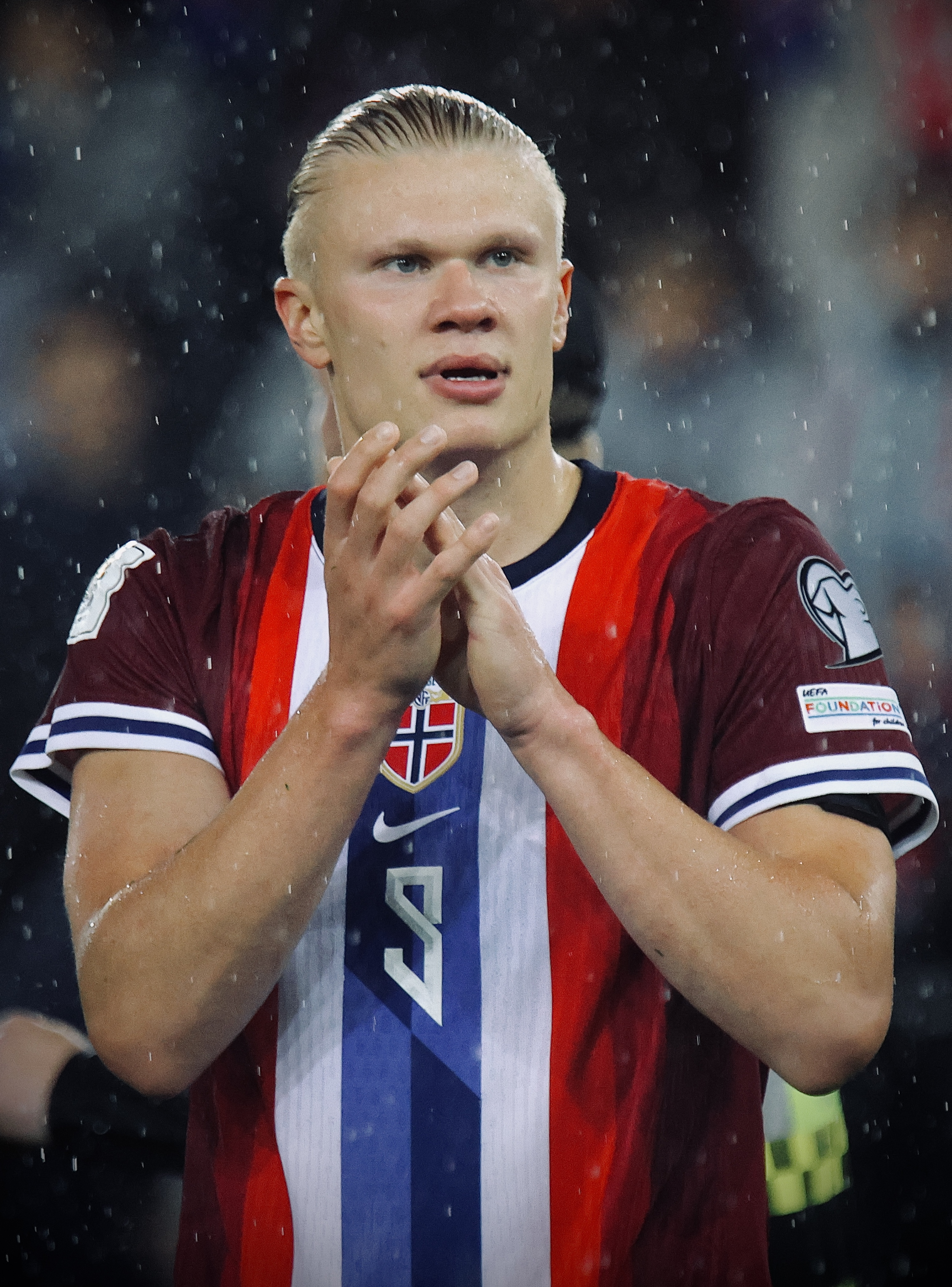
Erling Haaland recorded the original version of the song in 2016, with his teammates Erik Botheim and Erik Tobias Sandberg.

In 2016, Norwegian footballers Erling Haaland (credited as Lyng), Erik Botheim and Erik Tobias Sandberg formed the rap trio Flow Kingz and recorded the original track together during a training session with the Norway national under-17 football team. The beat is taken from an instrumental track by producer JMK, inspired by Kygo's signature sound, whilst the lyrics were written by the trio. The track features rap verses in Norwegian that pay tribute to Kygo, whose popularity was on the rise at the time.

The song was released alongside a music video showing Haaland and his teammates performing the track during a training camp, around a barbecue, on a trampoline and in a small car. It was uploaded to YouTube on 30 August 2016, when Haaland was 16 years old. In 2022, when he signed for Manchester City Football Club, Haaland spoke about the rap project he had set up with his teammates, saying: "It is a group of three. One guy – Erik Botheim – and Erik Tobias as well, we are good friends. We were a bit bored, so we decided to make a rap song!"

== 2026 resurgence ==
The video had attracted little attention when it was first released, but it resurfaced online during the 2026 FIFA World Cup, following Haaland's run in the tournament. Kygo then posted a video on Instagram in which he promised to release a new version of the song if Haaland scored a goal against the Brazilian national football team. His post was accompanied by the question "Should we release this?", to which Haaland replied in the affirmative.

On 5 July, Haaland scored a brace against Brazil in Norway's 2–1 victory in the round of 16, prompting Kygo to release the new version. The following day, Kygo announced that the track had been finalised. He officially released the new version of the song on 7 July, accompanied by a short video on his X account featuring Haaland's highlights alongside Norwegian fans. On 8 July, Haaland captioned the audio of the song on social media with the words "made it moment" and asked whether this meant he was "officially an artist now". Following its release, the song reached the top of the Spotify charts in Norway.

== Charts ==
Weekly chart performance for "Kygo Jo"
Chart (2026)	Peak position
Austria (Ö3 Austria Top 40)	65
Finland (Suomen virallinen lista)	32
Netherlands (Single Tip)	30
New Zealand Hot Singles (RMNZ)	27
Norway (IFPI Norge)	1
Sweden (Sverigetopplistan)	3
Sweden Dance (Sverigetopplistan)	1
Switzerland (Schweizer Hitparade)	67
