= Erik Botheim =

Norwegian footballer (born 2000)

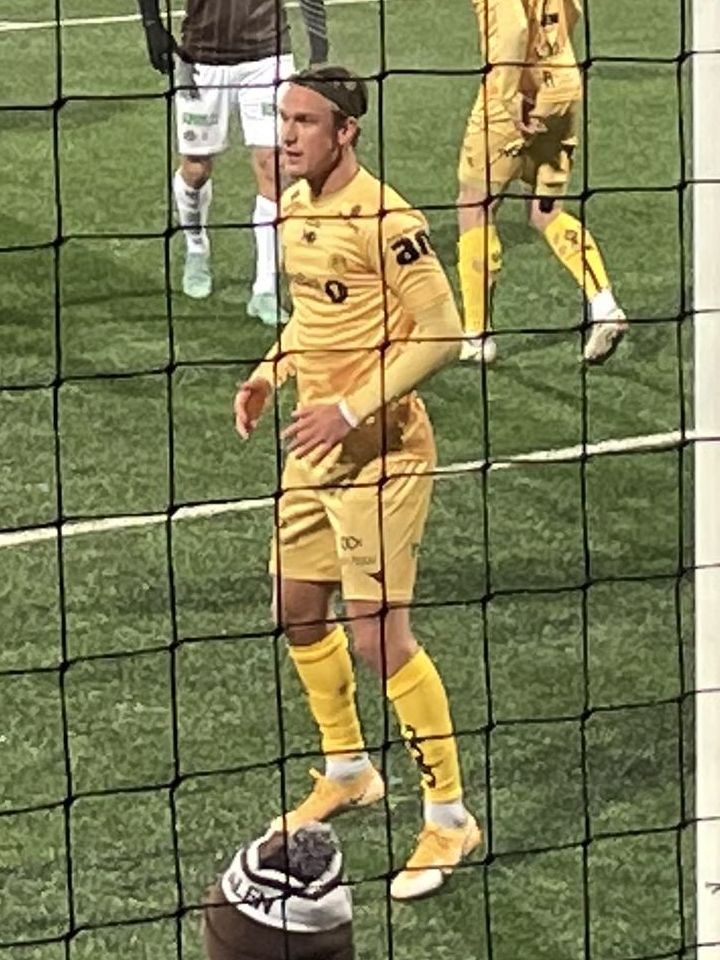
- Botheim playing for Bodø/Glimt in 2021

Personal information
- Date of birth: 10 January 2000 (age 26)
- Place of birth: Oslo, Norway
- Height: 1.87 m (6 ft 2 in)
- Position: Forward

Team information
- Current team: Viking
- Number: 22

Youth career
- –2015: Lyn

Senior career*
Years	Team	Apps	(Gls)
2015–2016	Lyn	18	(4)
2017–2020	Rosenborg	19	(4)
2020	→ Stabæk (loan)	15	(0)
2021	Bodø/Glimt	30	(15)
2022	Krasnodar	0	(0)
2022–2024	Salernitana	35	(1)
2024–2026	Malmö FF	57	(22)
2026–	Viking	7	(4)

International career^{‡}
2015	Norway U15	4	(1)
2016	Norway U16	19	(5)
2017	Norway U17	9	(1)
2018	Norway U18	9	(3)
2018–2019	Norway U19	9	(3)
2021–2023	Norway U21	17	(3)
2024–	Norway	2	(0)
- * Club domestic league appearances and goals as of 31 October 2026 ‡ National team caps and goals as of 22 March 2025

Erik Botheim (born 10 January 2000) is a Norwegian professional footballer who plays as a striker for Eliteserien club Viking and the Norway national team.

== Club career ==
=== Lyn ===
Erik Botheim started his career at Lyn and made his senior debut at 15 years old in June 2015, when he came off the bench against Ullern in a match that ended 2–2. He scored his first senior goal in October 2015, when he scored in Lyn's 9–2 win over Holmen.

=== Rosenborg ===
In July 2016, Botheim signed for Rosenborg. He made his debut for Rosenborg on 26 April 2017 in the first round of the Norwegian Football Cup, when he started away to Strindheim in a match that ended with a 2–0 win. Later that season, on 17 September 2017, he got his league debut for Rosenborg against Vålerenga, coming on for Anders Trondsen after 81 minutes in a game Rosenborg won 3–0. He scored his first Eliteserien goal against Tromsø on 7 July 2018. A year later, on 10 August 2019, Botheim scored his first hattrick, again scoring against Tromsø.

=== Bodø/Glimt ===
Botheim joined FK Bodø/Glimt after a mutual termination of his contract with Rosenborg. On 21 October 2021, Botheim scored two goals in Bodo/Glimt's 6–1 drubbing of José Mourinho's Roma in the UEFA Europa Conference League.

=== Krasnodar ===
On 22 December 2021, he signed a 3.5-year contract with Russian club Krasnodar. On 3 March 2022, following the Russian invasion of Ukraine, Krasnodar announced that his contract was suspended and he would not train with the team, but the contract was not terminated and remained valid. On 18 May 2022, his contract with Krasnodar was terminated.

=== Salernitana ===
On 7 July 2022, Botheim signed a contract until 2026 with Salernitana in Italy.

=== Malmö FF ===
On 31 January 2024, Botheim signed a four-year contract with Malmö FF. On 24 May 2024, Botheim scored a first-half hat-trick in a 5–0 win against Kalmar FF, marking his eighth Allsvenskan goal of the season. On 3 October 2024, he scored 2 goals in Malmö FF's 2–1 UEFA Europa League against Qarabağ, one of them being an acrobatic kick from Gabriel Busanello's cross. Botheim was instrumental in Malmö FF winning the 2024 Allsvenskan title, providing 12 goals and 5 assists in 30 games, as well as an additional 4 goals in the UEFA Europa League.

After a broken foot injury sidelined Botheim for most of the 2025 season, he returned in form in 2026. He scored 4 goals in the 2025–26 Svenska Cupen group stage, and netted instantly in his Allsvenskan return in a 1–1 draw against Örgryte IS on 5 April 2026. Almost exactly two years after his last hattrick, on 30 May 2026, Botheim scored 3 times in 8 minutes in a 5–2 win against Halmstads BK.

=== Viking ===
On 2 September 2026, Botheim joined Viking, signing a four-year contract.

== International career ==
On 8 June 2024, Botheim debuted for Norway's senior team in a 1–3 friendly loss against Denmark at Brøndby Stadium, coming on as a substitute for Oscar Bobb in the 88th minute.

== Personal life ==
In 2016 the music video for "Kygo Jo" was uploaded to YouTube by Flow Kingz, a group consisting of Botheim and his Norway U18 teammates Erik Tobias Sandberg and Erling Haaland. As of July 2026, the video has surpassed 19 million views and 640,000 likes. Coinciding with Norway's success at the 2026 FIFA World Cup, in July 2026 "Kygo Jo" was released as an official song on music platforms in collaboration with the eponymous Norwegian DJ Kygo.

== Career statistics ==
=== Club ===
As of match played 4 November 2026

Appearances and goals by club, season and competition
Club	Season	League			National cup (Note: Includes Norwegian Football Cup, Coppa Italia, Svenska Cupen)		Europe		Other		Total	
Club	Season	Division	Apps	Goals	Apps	Goals	Apps	Goals	Apps	Goals	Apps	Goals
Lyn	2015	Norwegian Second Division	7	1	0	0	–		–		7	1
Lyn	2016	Norwegian Third Division	11	3	2	1	–		–		13	4
Lyn	Total		18	4	2	1	0	0	0	0	20	5
Rosenborg	2017	Eliteserien	3	0	2	0	1 (Note: Appearance in UEFA Europa League)	0	–		6	0
Rosenborg	2018	Eliteserien	6	1	2	3	4 (Note: Two appearances in UEFA Champions League, two appearances in UEFA Europa League)	0	1 (Note: Appearance in Mesterfinalen)	0	13	4
Rosenborg	2019	Eliteserien	7	3	3	2	2	0	–		12	5
Rosenborg	2020	Eliteserien	3	0	0	0	0	0	–		3	0
Rosenborg	Total		19	4	7	5	7	0	1	0	34	9
Stabæk (loan)	2020	Eliteserien	15	0	0	0	–		–		15	0
Bodø/Glimt	2021	Eliteserien	30	15	2	0	14 (Note: Two appearances and one goal in UEFA Champions League, twelve appearances and seven goals in UEFA Europa League)	8	–		46	23
Salernitana	2022–23	Serie A	28	1	1	0	–		–		29	1
Salernitana	2023–24	Serie A	7	0	2	0	–		–		9	0
Salernitana	Total		35	1	3	0	0	0	0	0	38	1
Malmö FF	2024	Allsvenskan	30	12	6	3	12 (Note: Six appearances and zero goal in UEFA Champions League, six appearances and four goals in UEFA Europa League)	4	–		48	19
Malmö FF	2025	Allsvenskan	8	0	6	3	3	0	–		17	3
Malmö FF	2026	Allsvenskan	19	10	4	4	2	0	–		25	14
Malmö FF	Total		57	22	16	10	17	4	0	0	91	36
Viking	2026	Eliteserien	7	4	0	0	4 (Note: Four appearances and two goal in UEFA Champions League)	2	–		11	6
Career total			182	49	30	16	42	14	1	0	257	78

== Honours ==
Rosenborg U16

- Norwegian U-16 Championship: 2016

Rosenborg U19

- Norwegian U-19 Championship: 2019

Rosenborg

- Eliteserien: 2017, 2018
- Norwegian Football Cup: 2018
- Mesterfinalen: 2018

Bodø/Glimt

- Eliteserien: 2021

Malmö FF

- Allsvenskan: 2024
- Svenska Cupen: 2023–24

Individual

- Eliteserien Young Player of the Month: May 2021
