= Erik Tobias Sandberg =

Norwegian footballer (born 2000)

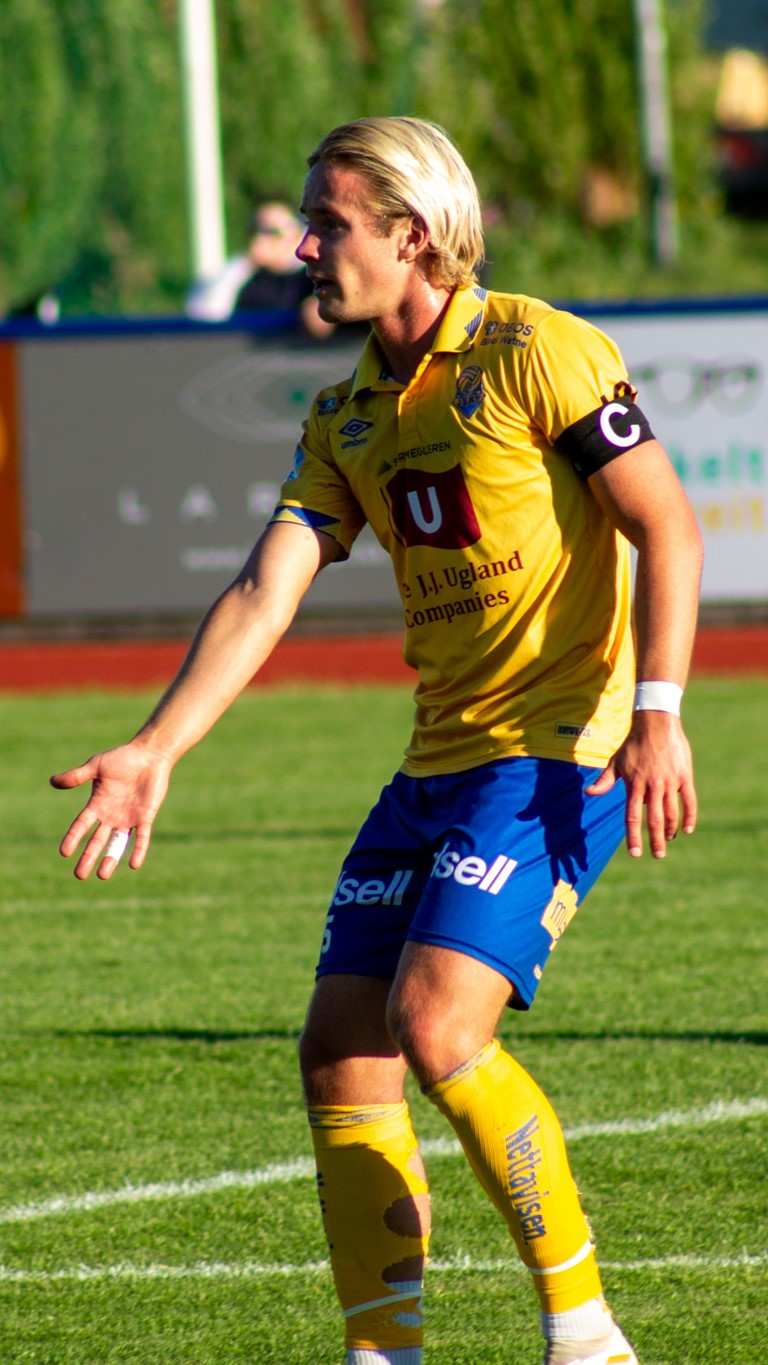
- Sandberg in 2023

Personal information
- Full name: Erik Tobias Tangen Sandberg
- Date of birth: 27 February 2000 (age 26)
- Place of birth: Norway
- Position: Defender

Team information
- Current team: ÍA
- Number: 13

Youth career
- –2017: Lillestrøm

Senior career*
Years	Team	Apps	(Gls)
2017–2022	Lillestrøm	5	(0)
2019	→ Skeid (loan)	4	(0)
2021	→ Jerv (loan)	29	(1)
2022–2023	Jerv	52	(0)
2024–	ÍA	66	(3)

International career^{‡}
2015	Norway U15	4	(0)
2016	Norway U16	15	(2)
2017	Norway U17	12	(0)
2018	Norway U18	13	(0)
2019–2021	Norway U19	10	(0)
- * Club domestic league appearances and goals as of 1 November 2026 ‡ National team caps and goals as of 8 April 2024

Erik Tobias Sandberg (born 27 February 2000) is a Norwegian football player who plays as a defender for ÍA.

== Career ==
Sandberg came through the youth ranks of Lillestrøm, and was a prolific youth international for Norway. Following a loan to Skeid, Sandberg missed the entire 2020 season due to injury. He was then on loan with Jerv in 2021 before joining the club permanently in 2022. In his three years at Jerv, he experienced promotion from the 2021 1. divisjon, and then relegation from the 2022 Eliteserien and the 2023 1. divisjon. Ahead of the 2024 season, Sandberg moved abroad for the first time, to Icelandic club Íþróttabandalag Akraness.

== Personal life ==
In 2016 the music video for "Kygo Jo" was uploaded to YouTube by Flow Kingz, a group consisting of Sandberg and his Norway U18 teammates Erik Botheim and Erling Haaland. As of July 2026, the video has surpassed 23 million views and 859,000 likes.
