= List of Bundesliga hat-tricks =

This is a list of Bundesliga hat-tricks. Since its creation, more than fifty players have scored at least one hat-trick. Gerd Müller has scored 32 Bundesliga hat-tricks, making him the player with the most hat-tricks in Bundesliga history. He also holds the record for most hat-tricks in a single season with six. Dieter Müller holds the record for most goals in one Bundesliga match with six.

== Hat-tricks ==
Key
^{4}	Player scored four goals
^{5}	Player scored five goals
^{6}	Player scored six goals
†	Player scored hat-trick as a substitute
*	The home team

Note: The results column shows the scorer's team score first

Player	Nationality	For	Against	Result	Date	Ref.
Charly Dörfel	West Germany	Hamburger SV*	1. FC Saarbrücken	4–2	31 August 1963	
Hermann Lulka	West Germany	Preußen Münster*	Meidericher SV	4–2	7 September 1963	
Otto Geisert	West Germany	Karlsruher SC	1. FC Nürnberg*	4–2	5 October 1963	
Arnold Schütz	West Germany	Werder Bremen*	Hamburger SV	4–2	12 October 1963	
Gerd Müller^{4}	West Germany	Bayern Munich*	1. FC Kaiserslautern	5–0	12 March 1966	
Jupp Heynckes	West Germany	Borussia Mönchengladbach*	1. FC Nürnberg	8–3	12 March 1966	
Jupp Heynckes	West Germany	Borussia Mönchengladbach*	Schalke 04	11–0	7 January 1967	
Herbert Laumen	West Germany	Borussia Mönchengladbach*	Schalke 04	11–0	7 January 1967	
Bernd Rupp	West Germany	Borussia Mönchengladbach*	Schalke 04	11–0	7 January 1967	
Gerd Müller	West Germany	Bayern Munich*	RW Essen	4–1	25 February 1967	
Gerd Müller	West Germany	Bayern Munich*	Alemannia Aachen	4–1	6 January 1968	
Gerd Müller^{4}	West Germany	Bayern Munich*	Hamburger SV	5–1	31 August 1968	
Gerd Müller	West Germany	Bayern Munich*	1. FC Kaiserslautern	3–0	12 November 1968	
Gerd Müller	West Germany	Bayern Munich*	Kickers Offenbach	5–1	24 May 1969	
Gerd Müller	West Germany	Bayern Munich*	RW Essen	4–0	16 August 1969	
Gerd Müller^{4}	West Germany	Bayern Munich*	Werder Bremen	4–1	4 October 1969	
Klaus Fischer	West Germany	1860 Munich	Eintracht Frankfurt*	3–4	1 November 1969	
Gerd Müller	West Germany	Bayern Munich	Borussia Dortmund*	3–1	7 February 1970	
Gerd Müller^{4}	West Germany	Bayern Munich*	RW Oberhausen	6–2	30 April 1970	
Klaus Fischer	West Germany	Schalke 04	RW Essen*	3–1	5 March 1971	
Gerd Müller	West Germany	Bayern Munich*	Hamburger SV	6–2	13 March 1971	
Klaus Fischer^{4}	West Germany	Schalke 04	Hannover 96*	5–1	14 August 1971	
Klaus Fischer	West Germany	Schalke 04*	RW Oberhausen	4–0	16 October 1971	
Gerd Müller	West Germany	Bayern Munich	Hamburger SV*	4–1	30 October 1971	
Gerd Müller^{4}	West Germany	Bayern Munich*	Borussia Dortmund	11–1	27 November 1971	
Gerd Müller^{5}	West Germany	Bayern Munich*	RW Oberhausen	7–0	19 February 1972	
Gerd Müller	West Germany	Bayern Munich*	VfL Bochum	5–1	18 March 1972	
Gerd Müller	West Germany	Bayern Munich*	Werder Bremen	6–2	8 April 1972	
Gerd Müller	West Germany	Bayern Munich*	Eintracht Frankfurt	6–3	3 June 1972	
Gerd Müller	West Germany	Bayern Munich	RW Oberhausen*	5–0	16 September 1972	
Gerd Müller^{4}	West Germany	Bayern Munich*	Hannover 96	7–2	11 November 1972	
Jupp Heynckes	West Germany	Borussia Mönchengladbach*	1. FC Köln	5–2	2 December 1972	
Gerd Müller^{5}	West Germany	Bayern Munich*	1. FC Kaiserslautern	6–0	5 May 1973	
Jupp Heynckes	West Germany	Borussia Mönchengladbach	Wuppertaler SV*	5–0	5 May 1973	
Gerd Müller^{4}	West Germany	Bayern Munich	Schalke 04*	5–5	9 August 1973	
Jupp Heynckes^{4}	West Germany	Borussia Mönchengladbach	RW Essen*	6–2	18 August 1973	
Klaus Fischer	West Germany	Schalke 04*	Wuppertaler SV	4–2	6 October 1973	
Gerd Müller	West Germany	Bayern Munich*	Hamburger SV	4–1	11 October 1973	
Jupp Heynckes	West Germany	Borussia Mönchengladbach	Fortuna Köln*	5–3	5 January 1974	
Gerd Müller	West Germany	Bayern Munich*	Fortuna Köln	5–1	12 January 1974	
Gerd Müller	West Germany	Bayern Munich*	Schalke 04	5–1	9 February 1974	
Klaus Fischer	West Germany	Schalke 04*	Fortuna Köln	6–1	2 March 1974	
Gerd Müller	West Germany	Bayern Munich*	Fortuna Düsseldorf	4–0	7 December 1974	
Jupp Heynckes	West Germany	Borussia Mönchengladbach	TeBe Berlin*	4–1	15 February 1975	
Jupp Heynckes	West Germany	Borussia Mönchengladbach*	Wuppertaler SV	6–2	24 May 1975	
Allan Simonsen	Denmark	Borussia Mönchengladbach*	Wuppertaler SV	6–2	24 May 1975	
Gerd Müller	West Germany	Bayern Munich	Fortuna Düsseldorf*	5–6	6 July 1975	
Klaus Fischer^{4}	West Germany	Schalke 04*	Karlsruher SC	6–2	27 March 1976	
Gerd Müller	West Germany	Bayern Munich*	MSV Duisburg	3–0	1 May 1976	
Gerd Müller^{5}	West Germany	Bayern Munich*	Hertha BSC	7–4	12 June 1976	
Detlev Szymanek	West Germany	Hertha BSC	Bayern Munich*	4–7	12 June 1976	
Jupp Heynckes	West Germany	Borussia Mönchengladbach*	VfL Bochum	4–2	28 August 1976	
Gerd Müller^{5}	West Germany	Bayern Munich*	TeBe Berlin	9–0	10 September 1976	
Karl-Heinz Rummenigge	West Germany	Bayern Munich*	TeBe Berlin	9–0	10 September 1976	
Jupp Heynckes	West Germany	Borussia Mönchengladbach*	RW Essen	6–0	24 September 1976	
Klaus Fischer^{4}	West Germany	Schalke 04	Bayern Munich*	7–0	9 October 1976	
Gerd Müller^{4}	West Germany	Bayern Munich*	Hamburger SV	6–2	30 October 1976	
Klaus Fischer	West Germany	Schalke 04*	1. FC Kaiserslautern	5–2	22 January 1977	
Klaus Fischer	West Germany	Schalke 04	Karlsruher SC*	7–1	9 April 1977	
Gerd Müller^{4}	West Germany	Bayern Munich*	RW Essen	5–1	23 April 1977	
Gerd Müller^{4}	West Germany	Bayern Munich*	FC St. Pauli	4–2	13 August 1977	
Dieter Müller^{6}	West Germany	1. FC Köln*	Werder Bremen	7–2	17 August 1977	
Manfred Burgsmüller	West Germany	Borussia Dortmund*	VfL Bochum	5–3	22 April 1978	
Jupp Heynckes^{5}	West Germany	Borussia Mönchengladbach*	Borussia Dortmund	12–0	29 April 1978	
Klaus Fischer	West Germany	Schalke 04*	Eintracht Frankfurt	4–0	12 August 1978	
Klaus Fischer	West Germany	Schalke 04*	Darmstadt 98	4–2	12 April 1979	
Manfred Burgsmüller	West Germany	Borussia Dortmund*	Fortuna Düsseldorf	5–3	22 September 1979	
Manfred Burgsmüller	West Germany	Borussia Dortmund*	MSV Duisburg	3–1	24 May 1980	
Manfred Burgsmüller	West Germany	Borussia Dortmund*	Arminia Bielefeld	5–0	13 September 1980	
Manfred Burgsmüller	West Germany	Borussia Dortmund*	MSV Duisburg	5–1	31 October 1980	
Manfred Burgsmüller	West Germany	Borussia Dortmund*	Bayer Leverkusen	5–3	14 March 1981	
Manfred Burgsmüller^{5}	West Germany	Borussia Dortmund*	Arminia Bielefeld	11–1	6 November 1982	
Bernd Klotz†	West Germany	Borussia Dortmund*	Arminia Bielefeld	11–1	6 November 1982	
Atli Eðvaldsson^{5}	Iceland	Fortuna Düsseldorf*	Eintracht Frankfurt	5–1	4 June 1983	
Manfred Burgsmüller	West Germany	1. FC Nürnberg*	Kickers Offenbach	4–0	3 September 1983	
Dieter Hoeneß^{5}	West Germany	Bayern Munich*	Eintracht Braunschweig	6–0	25 February 1984	
Manfred Burgsmüller	West Germany	Werder Bremen*	Fortuna Düsseldorf	7–3	22 February 1986	
Frank Neubarth^{4}	West Germany	Werder Bremen*	Fortuna Düsseldorf	7–3	22 February 1986	
Jürgen Klinsmann^{5}	West Germany	VfB Stuttgart	Fortuna Düsseldorf*	7–0	15 March 1986	
Manfred Burgsmüller	West Germany	Werder Bremen*	1. FC Nürnberg	5–3	9 August 1986	
Frank Hartmann^{5}	West Germany	1. FC Kaiserslautern*	Schalke 04	5–1	1 November 1986	
Michael Tönnies^{5}	Germany	MSV Duisburg*	Karlsruher SC	6–2	27 August 1991	
Lothar Sippel	Germany	Eintracht Frankfurt*	Stuttgarter Kickers	6–1	6 September 1991	
Ingo Anderbrügge	Germany	Schalke 04*	SG Wattenscheid 09	3–4	15 August 1992	
Andreas Thom	Germany	Bayer Leverkusen*	VfB Stuttgart	4–0	25 August 1992	
Karlheinz Pflipsen	Germany	Borussia Mönchengladbach*	Dynamo Dresden	5–1	2 April 1993	
Stéphane Chapuisat	Switzerland	Borussia Dortmund*	SG Wattenscheid 09	6–0	16 April 1993	
Mehmet Scholl	Germany	Bayern Munich*	1. FC Saarbrücken	6–0	23 April 1993	
Tony Yeboah^{4}	Ghana	Eintracht Frankfurt	Bayer 05 Uerdingen*	5–2	22 May 1993	
Olaf Marschall	Germany	Dynamo Dresden	VfB Leipzig*	3–3	7 August 1993	
Stéphane Chapuisat	Switzerland	Borussia Dortmund*	Dynamo Dresden	4–0	1 September 1993	
Tony Yeboah	Ghana	Eintracht Frankfurt*	SC Freiburg	3–0	8 September 1993	
Marek Leśniak	Poland	SG Wattenscheid 09	Bayern Munich*	3–3	18 September 1993	
Stefan Kuntz	Germany	1. FC Kaiserslautern*	VfB Stuttgart	5–0	9 October 1993	
Manfred Bender	Germany	Karlsruher SC*	MSV Duisburg	5–0	6 November 1993	
Martin Max	Germany	Borussia Mönchengladbach	1. FC Köln*	4–0	13 November 1993	
Paulo Sérgio	Brazil	Bayer Leverkusen	VfB Stuttgart*	4–1	13 November 1993	
Uwe Wassmer	Germany	SC Freiburg*	Bayern Munich	3–1	27 November 1993	
Sergei Kiriakov	Russia	Karlsruher SC*	Borussia Dortmund	3–3	27 November 1993	
Martin Dahlin	Sweden	Borussia Mönchengladbach*	VfB Leipzig	6–1	26 March 1994	
Stéphane Chapuisat	Switzerland	Borussia Dortmund*	Werder Bremen	3–2	2 April 1994	
Frank Neubarth	Germany	Werder Bremen*	SC Freiburg	3–2	6 April 1994	
Pavel Kuka	Czech Republic	1. FC Kaiserslautern	MSV Duisburg*	7–1	10 April 1994	
Fritz Walter	Germany	VfB Stuttgart*	Dynamo Dresden	3–0	7 May 1994	
Mario Basler	Germany	Werder Bremen*	VfL Bochum	3–0	27 August 1994	
Michael Zorc	Germany	Borussia Dortmund	Hamburger SV*	4–0	10 December 1994	
Ulf Kirsten	Germany	Bayer Leverkusen	Karlsruher SC*	4–2	12 May 1995	
Martin Dahlin	Sweden	Borussia Mönchengladbach*	Schalke 04	4–1	5 November 1995	
Ulf Kirsten	Germany	Bayer Leverkusen	MSV Duisburg*	3–1	21 August 1996	
Sean Dundee	South Africa	Karlsruher SC*	FC St. Pauli	4–0	28 August 1996	
Bruno Labbadia	Germany	Werder Bremen*	VfL Bochum	5–1	13 September 1996	
Sean Dundee	South Africa	Karlsruher SC*	Arminia Bielefeld	5–2	27 September 1996	
Fredi Bobic	Germany	VfB Stuttgart*	Borussia Mönchengladbach	5–0	26 October 1996	
Uwe Wassmer	Germany	SC Freiburg	MSV Duisburg*	4–1	2 November 1996	
Arie van Lent	Netherlands	Werder Bremen*	1. FC Köln	3–2	9 May 1997	
Olaf Bodden	Germany	1860 Munich	Arminia Bielefeld*	3–2	10 May 1997	
Ulf Kirsten	Germany	Bayer Leverkusen*	Hamburger SV	5–0	11 May 1997	
Toni Polster	Austria	1. FC Köln	Hamburger SV*	4–0	17 May 1997	
Toni Polster	Austria	1. FC Köln*	Bayer Leverkusen	4–0	24 May 1997	
Matthias Hagner	Germany	VfB Stuttgart*	Arminia Bielefeld	4–2	31 May 1997	
Olaf Marschall	Germany	1. FC Kaiserslautern*	VfB Stuttgart	4–1	14 August 1997	
Ulf Kirsten	Germany	Bayer Leverkusen*	1. FC Köln	4–0	11 November 1997	
Ulf Kirsten	Germany	Bayer Leverkusen*	Bayern Munich	4–2	30 November 1997	
Markus Schroth	Germany	Karlsruher SC	Werder Bremen*	4–2	6 December 1997	
Toni Polster	Austria	1. FC Köln*	Borussia Dortmund	4–2	13 December 1997	
Michael Preetz	Germany	Hertha BSC*	Borussia Mönchengladbach	4–1	2 October 1998	
Sergei Kiriakov	Russia	Hamburger SV*	MSV Duisburg	4–1	17 October 1998	
Ulf Kirsten	Germany	Bayer Leverkusen	Borussia Mönchengladbach*	8–2	30 October 1998	
Tony Yeboah	Ghana	Hamburger SV*	Borussia Mönchengladbach	3–0	28 November 1998	
Jonathan Akpoborie	Nigeria	VfB Stuttgart*	Hamburger SV	3–1	5 December 1998	
Markus Beierle	Germany	MSV Duisburg*	Hansa Rostock	4–1	5 March 1999	
Jonathan Akpoborie	Nigeria	VfB Stuttgart	VfL Bochum*	3–3	17 April 1999	
Ulf Kirsten	Germany	Bayer Leverkusen*	Borussia Mönchengladbach	4–1	17 April 1999	
Oliver Neuville	Germany	Hansa Rostock*	1860 Munich	4–1	1 May 1999	
Markus Beierle	Germany	MSV Duisburg*	VfL Wolfsburg	6–2	29 May 1999	
Roy Präger	Germany	Hamburger SV*	Hertha BSC	5–1	11 September 1999	
Adel Sellimi	Tunisia	SC Freiburg*	Hansa Rostock	5–0	17 September 1999	
Claudio Pizarro	Peru	Werder Bremen	VfL Wolfsburg*	7–2	19 September 1999	
Marco Bode	Germany	Werder Bremen	VfL Wolfsburg*	7–2	19 September 1999	
Giovane Élber	Brazil	Bayern Munich*	VfL Wolfsburg	5–0	30 October 1999	
Tony Yeboah	Ghana	Hamburger SV*	Arminia Bielefeld	5–0	21 November 1999	
Martin Max	Germany	1860 Munich*	Hansa Rostock	4–3	3 March 2000	
Zoltán Sebescen	Hungary	VfL Wolfsburg*	Hamburger SV	4–4	3 March 2000	
Jonathan Akpoborie	Nigeria	VfL Wolfsburg	VfB Stuttgart*	5–2	8 April 2000	
Igli Tare	Albania	1. FC Kaiserslautern*	SSV Ulm	6–2	29 April 2000	
Andrzej Juskowiak	Poland	VfL Wolfsburg*	1. FC Kaiserslautern	4–0	19 August 2000	
Émile Mpenza	Belgium	Schalke 04	Hansa Rostock*	4–0	20 August 2000	
Ebbe Sand	Denmark	Schalke 04*	Energie Cottbus	3–0	5 September 2000	
Jonathan Akpoborie	Nigeria	VfL Wolfsburg*	Hamburger SV	4–4	23 September 2000	
André Breitenreiter	Germany	SpVgg Unterhaching*	Hertha BSC	5–2	24 September 2000	
Adhemar	Brazil	VfB Stuttgart*	1. FC Kaiserslautern	6–1	3 February 2001	
Ionel Ganea	Romania	VfB Stuttgart*	1. FC Kaiserslautern	6–1	3 February 2001	
Ebbe Sand	Denmark	Schalke 04	Bayern Munich*	3–1	14 April 2001	
Giovane Élber	Brazil	Bayern Munich*	VfB Stuttgart	4–0	30 September 2001	
Oliver Neuville	Germany	Bayer Leverkusen*	Hamburger SV	4–1	24 November 2001	
Arie van Lent	Netherlands	Borussia Mönchengladbach*	1. FC Köln	4–0	5 February 2002	
Bart Goor^{4}	Belgium	Hertha BSC*	Hamburger SV	6–0	10 March 2002	
Martin Max	Germany	1860 Munich*	FC St. Pauli	4–2	30 March 2002	
Soumaïla Coulibaly	Mali	SC Freiburg*	Hamburger SV	4–3	4 May 2002	
Giovane Élber^{4}	Brazil	Bayern Munich*	Arminia Bielefeld	6–2	17 August 2002	
Thomas Christiansen	Spain	VfL Bochum*	Energie Cottbus	5–0	17 August 2002	
Aílton	Brazil	Werder Bremen*	1. FC Nürnberg	4–1	10 September 2002	
Kevin Kurányi	Germany	VfB Stuttgart*	Arminia Bielefeld	3–0	22 September 2002	
Ionel Ganea	Romania	VfB Stuttgart*	VfL Bochum	3–2	9 November 2002	
Markus Schroth	Germany	1860 Munich	Hansa Rostock*	4–1	25 January 2003	
Mohammadou Idrissou	Cameroon	Hannover 96*	1. FC Nürnberg	4–2	8 February 2003	
Mehmet Scholl	Germany	Bayern Munich	1860 Munich*	5–0	15 February 2003	
Mamadou Diabang	Senegal	Arminia Bielefeld*	Borussia Mönchengladbach	4–1	15 March 2003	
Giovane Élber	Brazil	Bayern Munich	Hertha BSC*	6–3	10 May 2003	
Martin Max	Germany	Hansa Rostock*	Eintracht Frankfurt	3–0	16 August 2003	
Benjamin Lauth	Germany	1860 Munich*	VfL Bochum	3–1	1 November 2003	
Aleksandr Iashvili	Georgia	SC Freiburg*	VfL Wolfsburg	3–2	8 November 2003	
Aílton	Brazil	Werder Bremen*	VfL Bochum	3–1	22 November 2003	
Miroslav Klose	Germany	1. FC Kaiserslautern*	Hertha BSC	3–2	23 November 2003	
Fernando Baiano	Brazil	VfL Wolfsburg*	1. FC Kaiserslautern	4–1	6 December 2003	
Roda Antar	Lebanon	SC Freiburg*	VfL Bochum	4–2	6 December 2003	
Marcelo Bordon	Brazil	VfB Stuttgart*	Werder Bremen	4–4	28 March 2004	
França	Brazil	Bayer Leverkusen	Werder Bremen*	6–2	15 May 2004	
Cacau	Germany	VfB Stuttgart*	Mainz 05	4–2	8 August 2004	
Kevin Kurányi	Germany	VfB Stuttgart	1. FC Kaiserslautern*	3–2	28 August 2004	
Marek Mintál	Slovakia	1. FC Nürnberg	Hamburger SV*	3–4	28 August 2004	
Miroslav Klose	Germany	Werder Bremen	VfL Bochum*	4–1	25 September 2004	
Andriy Voronin	Ukraine	Bayer Leverkusen*	Arminia Bielefeld	3–2	27 October 2004	
Sergej Barbarez	Bosnia and Herzegovina	Hamburger SV*	SC Freiburg	4–0	27 October 2004	
Martin Petrov^{4}	Bulgaria	VfL Wolfsburg*	Mainz 05	4–3	30 October 2004	
Marek Mintál	Slovakia	1. FC Nürnberg*	VfL Wolfsburg	4–0	6 November 2004	
Marcelinho Paraíba	Brazil	Hertha BSC	VfL Wolfsburg*	3–2	27 November 2004	
Angelos Charisteas	Greece	Werder Bremen	SC Freiburg*	6–0	4 December 2004	
Roy Makaay	Netherlands	Bayern Munich*	Borussia Dortmund	5–0	19 February 2005	
Aílton	Brazil	Schalke 04	Borussia Mönchengladbach*	3–1	20 February 2005	
Kevin Kurányi	Germany	VfB Stuttgart*	Schalke 04	3–0	9 April 2005	
Massimilian Porcello	Germany	Arminia Bielefeld*	SC Freiburg	3–1	23 April 2005	
Roy Makaay	Netherlands	Bayern Munich	1. FC Kaiserslautern*	4–0	30 April 2005	
Roy Makaay	Netherlands	Bayern Munich	Mainz 05*	4–2	7 May 2005	
Dimitar Berbatov	Bulgaria	Bayer Leverkusen*	Borussia Mönchengladbach	5–1	21 May 2005	
Halil Altıntop	Turkey	1. FC Kaiserslautern*	MSV Duisburg	5–3	13 August 2005	
Roy Makaay	Netherlands	Bayern Munich	Bayer Leverkusen*	5–2	13 August 2005	
Miroslav Klose	Germany	Werder Bremen*	1. FC Nürnberg	6–2	15 October 2005	
Halil Altıntop	Turkey	1. FC Kaiserslautern*	Borussia Dortmund	3–3	15 October 2005	
Ebi Smolarek	Poland	Borussia Dortmund	1. FC Kaiserslautern*	3–3	15 October 2005	
Halil Altıntop	Turkey	1. FC Kaiserslautern*	VfL Wolfsburg	3–2	17 December 2005	
Róbert Vittek	Slovakia	1. FC Nürnberg*	MSV Duisburg	3–0	4 March 2006	
Róbert Vittek	Slovakia	1. FC Nürnberg	1. FC Köln*	4–3	11 March 2006	
Ioannis Amanatidis	Greece	Eintracht Frankfurt*	MSV Duisburg	5–2	18 March 2006	
Nelson Valdez	Paraguay	Werder Bremen*	Hannover 96	5–0	25 March 2006	
Dimitar Berbatov	Bulgaria	Bayer Leverkusen*	1. FC Kaiserslautern	5–1	1 April 2006	
Naohiro Takahara	Japan	Eintracht Frankfurt	Alemannia Aachen*	3–2	3 December 2006	
Naldo	Brazil	Werder Bremen	Eintracht Frankfurt*	6–2	9 December 2006	
Mohamed Zidan	Egypt	Mainz 05*	Energie Cottbus	4–1	10 February 2007	
Markus Rosenberg	Sweden	Werder Bremen	Hertha BSC*	4–1	6 May 2007	
Miroslav Klose	Germany	Bayern Munich*	Energie Cottbus	5–0	26 September 2007	
Ivica Olić	Croatia	Hamburger SV*	VfB Stuttgart	4–1	20 October 2007	
Enrico Kern	Germany	Hansa Rostock*	Energie Cottbus	3–2	10 November 2007	
Mike Hanke	Germany	Hannover 96*	Werder Bremen	4–3	8 December 2007	
Martin Fenin	Czech Republic	Eintracht Frankfurt	Hertha BSC*	3–0	2 February 2008	
Luca Toni	Italy	Bayern Munich	Hannover 96*	3–0	17 February 2008	
Mario Gómez	Germany	VfB Stuttgart*	Werder Bremen	6–3	8 March 2008	
Kevin Kurányi^{4}	Germany	Schalke 04*	Energie Cottbus	5–0	15 April 2008	
Paolo Guerrero	Peru	Hamburger SV*	Karlsruher SC	7–0	17 May 2008	
Patrick Helmes	Germany	Bayer Leverkusen*	Hannover 96	4–0	19 September 2008	
Grafite	Brazil	VfL Wolfsburg*	Energie Cottbus	3–0	8 November 2008	
Claudio Pizarro	Peru	Werder Bremen*	Eintracht Frankfurt	5–0	29 November 2008	
Demba Ba	Senegal	TSG Hoffenheim	VfB Stuttgart*	3–3	21 February 2009	
Andriy Voronin	Ukraine	Hertha BSC	Energie Cottbus*	3–1	7 March 2009	
Grafite	Brazil	VfL Wolfsburg*	Schalke 04	4–3	13 March 2009	
Claudio Pizarro	Peru	Werder Bremen*	Hannover 96	4–1	5 April 2009	
Stanislav Šesták	Slovakia	VfL Bochum	TSG Hoffenheim*	3–0	11 April 2009	
Mario Gómez	Germany	VfB Stuttgart	1. FC Köln*	3–0	18 April 2009	
Edin Džeko	Bosnia and Herzegovina	VfL Wolfsburg*	TSG Hoffenheim	4–0	2 May 2009	
Edin Džeko	Bosnia and Herzegovina	VfL Wolfsburg	Hannover 96*	5–0	16 May 2009	
Vedad Ibišević	Bosnia and Herzegovina	TSG Hoffenheim*	Hertha BSC	5–1	27 September 2009	
Stefan Kießling	Germany	Bayer Leverkusen*	VfB Stuttgart	4–0	29 November 2009	
Albert Bunjaku	Switzerland	1. FC Nürnberg	Hannover 96*	3–1	30 January 2010	
Cacau^{4}	Germany	VfB Stuttgart	1. FC Köln*	5–1	20 February 2010	
Theofanis Gekas	Greece	Hertha BSC	VfL Wolfsburg*	5–1	21 March 2010	
Arjen Robben	Netherlands	Bayern Munich*	Hannover 96	7–0	17 April 2010	
Lucas Barrios	Paraguay	Borussia Dortmund	1. FC Nürnberg*	3–2	24 April 2010	
Thomas Müller	Germany	Bayern Munich*	VfL Bochum	3–1	1 May 2010	
Pavel Pogrebnyak	Russia	VfB Stuttgart*	Borussia Mönchengladbach	7–0	18 September 2010	
Mario Gómez	Germany	Bayern Munich*	Hannover 96	3–0	16 October 2010	
Milivoje Novaković	Slovenia	1. FC Köln*	Hamburger SV	3–2	30 October 2010	
Raúl	Spain	Schalke 04*	Werder Bremen	4–0	20 November 2010	
Hugo Almeida	Portugal	Werder Bremen*	FC St. Pauli	3–0	28 November 2010	
Raúl	Spain	Schalke 04*	1. FC Köln	3–0	18 December 2010	
Mario Gómez	Germany	Bayern Munich	VfB Stuttgart*	5–3	19 December 2010	
Mario Gómez	Germany	Bayern Munich*	1. FC Kaiserslautern	5–1	22 January 2011	
Christian Eigler^{4}	Germany	1. FC Nürnberg*	FC St. Pauli	5–0	5 March 2011	
Arjen Robben	Netherlands	Bayern Munich*	Hamburger SV	6–0	12 March 2011	
Mladen Petrić	Croatia	Hamburger SV*	1. FC Köln	6–2	19 March 2011	
Mario Gómez	Germany	Bayern Munich*	Bayer Leverkusen	5–1	17 April 2011	
Mario Gómez	Germany	Bayern Munich	FC St. Pauli*	8–1	7 May 2011	
Klaas-Jan Huntelaar	Netherlands	Schalke 04*	1. FC Köln	5–1	13 August 2011	
Mario Gómez	Germany	Bayern Munich	1. FC Kaiserslautern*	3–0	27 August 2011	
Mario Gómez^{4}	Germany	Bayern Munich*	SC Freiburg	7–0	10 September 2011	
Robert Lewandowski	Poland	Borussia Dortmund*	FC Augsburg	4–0	1 October 2011	
Mohammed Abdellaoue	Norway	Hannover 96*	Werder Bremen	3–2	2 October 2011	
Claudio Pizarro	Peru	Werder Bremen*	1. FC Köln	3–2	5 November 2011	
Marco Reus	Germany	Borussia Mönchengladbach*	SV Werder Bremen	5–0	19 November 2011	
Eren Derdiyok	Switzerland	Bayer Leverkusen	Hertha BSC*	3–3	26 November 2011	
Raúl	Spain	Schalke 04*	Werder Bremen	5–0	17 December 2011	
Martin Harnik	Austria	VfB Stuttgart*	Hertha BSC	5–0	11 February 2012	
Mario Gómez	Germany	Bayern Munich*	TSG Hoffenheim	7–1	10 March 2012	
Arjen Robben	Netherlands	Bayern Munich	Hertha BSC*	6–0	17 March 2012	
Lucas Barrios	Paraguay	Borussia Dortmund	1. FC Kaiserslautern*	5–2	28 April 2012	
Stefan Kießling	Germany	Bayer Leverkusen	1. FC Nürnberg*	4–1	5 May 2012	
Ádám Szalai	Hungary	Mainz 05*	TSG Hoffenheim	3–0	27 October 2012	
Marko Arnautović	Austria	Werder Bremen	TSG Hoffemhein*	4–1	2 December 2012	
Vedad Ibišević	Bosnia and Herzegovina	VfB Stuttgart*	Schalke 04	3–1	8 December 2012	
Marco Reus	Germany	Borussia Dortmund*	Eintracht Frankfurt	3–0	16 February 2013	
Claudio Pizarro^{4}	Peru	Bayern Munich*	Hamburger SV	9–2	30 March 2013	
Klaas-Jan Huntelaar	Netherlands	Schalke 04*	Hamburger SV	4–1	28 April 2013	
Branimir Hrgota	Sweden	Borussia Mönchengladbach	Mainz 05*	4–2	11 May 2013	
Pierre-Emerick Aubameyang	Gabon	Borussia Dortmund	FC Augsburg*	4–0	10 August 2013	
Vedad Ibišević	Bosnia and Herzegovina	VfB Stuttgart*	TSG Hoffenheim	6–2	1 September 2013	
Pierre-Michel Lasogga	Germany	Hamburger SV	1. FC Nürnberg*	5–0	6 October 2013	
Robert Lewandowski	Poland	Borussia Dortmund*	VfB Stuttgart	6–1	1 November 2013	
Son Heung-min	South Korea	Bayer Leverkusen*	Hamburger SV	5–3	9 November 2013	
Domi Kumbela†	DR Congo	Eintracht Braunschweig*	Hamburger SV	4–2	15 February 2014	
Arjen Robben	Netherlands	Bayern Munich*	Schalke 04	5–1	1 March 2014	
Klaas-Jan Huntelaar	Netherlands	Schalke 04*	TSG Hoffenheim	4–0	8 March 2014	
Marco Reus	Germany	Borussia Dortmund	VfB Stuttgart*	3–2	29 March 2014	
Thomas Müller	Germany	Bayern Munich	Eintracht Frankfurt*	4–0	8 November 2014	
Klaas-Jan Huntelaar	Netherlands	Schalke 04*	Mainz 05	4–1	29 November 2014	
Eric Maxim Choupo-Moting	Cameroon	Schalke 04	VfB Stuttgart*	4–0	6 December 2014	
Nils Petersen	Germany	SC Freiburg*	Eintracht Frankfurt	4–1	31 January 2015	
Bas Dost^{4}	Netherlands	VfL Wolfsburg	Bayer Leverkusen*	5–4	14 February 2015	
Son Heung-min	South Korea	Bayer Leverkusen*	VfL Wolfsburg	4–5	14 February 2015	
Alexander Meier	Germany	Eintracht Frankfurt*	1. FC Köln	6–2	12 September 2015	
Robert Lewandowski^{5}†	Poland	Bayern Munich*	VfL Wolfsburg	5–1	22 September 2015	
Alexander Meier	Germany	Eintracht Frankfurt*	VfL Wolfsburg	3–2	24 January 2016	
Claudio Pizarro	Peru	Werder Bremen	Bayer Leverkusen*	4–1	2 March 2016	
Koo Ja-cheol	South Korea	Augsburg	Bayer Leverkusen*	3–3	5 March 2016	
Robert Lewandowski	Poland	Bayern Munich*	Werder Bremen	6–0	26 August 2016	
Joel Pohjanpalo†	Finland	Bayer Leverkusen*	Hamburger SV	3–1	10 September 2016	
Javier Hernández	Mexico	Bayer Leverkusen	Mainz 05*	3–2	24 September 2016	
Anthony Modeste	France	1. FC Köln*	Hamburger SV	3–0	30 October 2016	
Salomon Kalou	Ivory Coast	Hertha BSC*	Borussia Mönchengladbach	3–0	4 November 2016	
Pierre-Emerick Aubameyang^{4}	Gabon	Borussia Dortmund	Hamburger SV*	5–2	5 November 2016	
Danny Latza	Germany	Mainz 05*	Hamburger SV	3–1	17 December 2016	
Robert Lewandowski	Poland	Bayern Munich*	Hamburger SV	8–0	25 February 2017	
Anthony Modeste	France	1. FC Köln*	Hertha BSC	4–2	18 March 2017	
Robert Lewandowski	Poland	Bayern Munich*	FC Augsburg	6–0	1 April 2017	
Thomas Delaney	Denmark	Werder Bremen	SC Freiburg*	5–2	1 April 2017	
Mario Gómez	Germany	VfL Wolfsburg	Bayer Leverkusen*	3–3	2 April 2017	
Max Kruse^{4}	Germany	Werder Bremen	FC Ingolstadt*	4–2	22 April 2017	
Alfreð Finnbogason	Iceland	FC Augsburg*	1. FC Köln	3–0	9 September 2017	
Pierre-Emerick Aubameyang	Gabon	Borussia Dortmund*	Borussia Mönchengladbach	6–1	23 September 2017	
Max Kruse	Germany	Werder Bremen*	Hannover 96	4–0	19 November 2017	
Nils Petersen	Germany	SC Freiburg	1. FC Köln*	4–3	10 December 2017	
Alfreð Finnbogason	Iceland	FC Augsburg*	SC Freiburg	3–3	16 December 2017	
Niclas Füllkrug	Germany	Hannover 96*	Mainz 05	3–2	13 January 2018	
Robert Lewandowski	Poland	Bayern Munich*	Hamburger SV	6–0	10 March 2018	
Robert Lewandowski	Poland	Bayern Munich*	Borussia Dortmund	6–0	31 March 2018	
Kevin Volland	Germany	Bayer Leverkusen*	Eintracht Frankfurt	4–1	14 April 2018	
Andrej Kramarić	Croatia	TSG Hoffenheim*	Hannover 96	3–1	27 April 2018	
Alfreð Finnbogason	Iceland	FC Augsburg*	SC Freiburg	4–1	30 September 2018	
Paco Alcácer†	Spain	Borussia Dortmund*	FC Augsburg	4–3	6 October 2018	
Luka Jović^{5}	Serbia	Eintracht Frankfurt*	Fortuna Düsseldorf	7–1	19 October 2018	
Jonas Hofmann	Germany	Borussia Mönchengladbach*	Mainz 05	4–0	21 October 2018	
Alassane Pléa	France	Borussia Mönchengladbach	Werder Bremen*	3–1	10 November 2018	
Dodi Lukebakio	Belgium	Fortuna Düsseldorf	Bayern Munich*	3–3	24 November 2018	
Alfreð Finnbogason	Iceland	FC Augsburg*	Mainz 05	3–0	3 February 2019	
Wout Weghorst	Netherlands	VfL Wolfsburg*	Fortuna Düsseldorf	5–2	16 March 2019	
James Rodríguez	Colombia	Bayern Munich*	Mainz 05	6–0	17 March 2019	
Yussuf Poulsen	Denmark	RB Leipzig*	Hertha BSC	5–0	30 March 2019	
Jean-Philippe Mateta	France	Mainz 05*	SC Freiburg	5–0	5 April 2019	
Ishak Belfodil	Algeria	TSG Hoffenheim	FC Augsburg*	4–0	7 April 2019	
Lucas Alario	Argentina	Bayer Leverkusen	Hertha BSC*	5–1	18 May 2019	
Wout Weghorst	Netherlands	VfL Wolfsburg*	FC Augsburg	8–1	18 May 2019	
Robert Lewandowski	Poland	Bayern Munich	Schalke 04*	3–0	24 August 2019	
Timo Werner	Germany	RB Leipzig	Borussia Mönchengladbach*	3–1	30 August 2019	
Timo Werner	Germany	RB Leipzig*	Mainz 05	8–0	2 November 2019	
Rouwen Hennings	Germany	Fortuna Düsseldorf	Schalke 04*	3–3	9 November 2019	
Philippe Coutinho	Brazil	Bayern Munich*	Werder Bremen	6–1	14 December 2019	
Robin Quaison	Sweden	Mainz 05	Werder Bremen*	5–0	17 December 2019	
Erling Haaland†	Norway	Borussia Dortmund	FC Augsburg*	5–3	18 January 2020	
Robin Quaison	Sweden	Mainz 05	Hertha BSC*	3–1	8 February 2020	
Wout Weghorst	Netherlands	VfL Wolfsburg	TSG Hoffenheim*	3–2	15 February 2020	
Timo Werner	Germany	RB Leipzig	Mainz 05*	5–0	24 May 2020	
Jadon Sancho	England	Borussia Dortmund	SC Paderborn*	6–1	31 May 2020	
Andrej Kramarić^{4}	Croatia	TSG Hoffenheim	Borussia Dortmund*	4–0	27 June 2020	
Serge Gnabry	Germany	Bayern Munich*	Schalke 04	8–0	18 September 2020	
Andrej Kramarić	Croatia	TSG Hoffenheim	1. FC Köln*	3–2	19 September 2020	
Niclas Füllkrug	Germany	Werder Bremen	Schalke 04*	3–1	26 September 2020	
Robert Lewandowski^{4}	Poland	Bayern Munich*	Hertha BSC	4–3	4 October 2020	
Robert Lewandowski	Poland	Bayern Munich*	Eintracht Frankfurt	5–0	24 October 2020	
Erling Haaland^{4}	Norway	Borussia Dortmund	Hertha BSC*	5–2	21 November 2020	
Jean-Philippe Mateta	France	Mainz 05	SC Freiburg*	3–1	22 November 2020	
Lars Stindl	Germany	Borussia Mönchengladbach	Eintracht Frankfurt*	3–3	15 December 2020	
Matthew Hoppe	United States	Schalke 04*	TSG Hoffenheim	4–0	9 January 2021	
Robert Lewandowski	Poland	Bayern Munich*	Borussia Dortmund	4–2	6 March 2021	
Robert Lewandowski	Poland	Bayern Munich*	VfB Stuttgart	4–0	20 March 2021	
Joel Pohjanpalo	Finland	Union Berlin*	Werder Bremen	3–1	24 April 2021	
Josip Brekalo	Croatia	VfL Wolfsburg*	Union Berlin	3–0	8 May 2021	
Robert Lewandowski	Poland	Bayern Munich*	Borussia Mönchengladbach	6–0	8 May 2021	
Robert Lewandowski	Poland	Bayern Munich*	Hertha BSC	5–0	28 August 2021	
Ihlas Bebou	Togo	TSG Hoffenheim	Greuther Fürth	6–3	27 November 2021	
Patrik Schick^{4}	Czech Republic	Bayer Leverkusen	Greuther Fürth	7–1	4 December 2021	
Serge Gnabry	Germany	Bayern Munich	VfB Stuttgart*	5–0	14 December 2021	
Robert Lewandowski	Poland	Bayern Munich	1. FC Köln*	4–0	15 January 2022	
Moussa Diaby	France	Bayer Leverkusen*	FC Augsburg	5–1	22 January 2022	
Max Kruse	Germany	VfL Wolfsburg*	Mainz 05	5–0	22 April 2022	
Erling Haaland	Norway	Borussia Dortmund*	VfL Bochum	3–4	30 April 2022	
Serge Gnabry	Germany	Bayern Munich*	Werder Bremen	6–1	8 November 2022	
Vincenzo Grifo	Italy	SC Freiburg*	Union Berlin	4–1	13 November 2022	
Karim Onisiwo	Austria	Mainz 05*	VfL Bochum	5–2	28 January 2023	
Marvin Ducksch	Germany	Werder Bremen	Hertha BSC*	4–2	22 April 2023	
Kevin Behrens	Germany	Union Berlin*	Mainz 05	4–1	20 August 2023	
Serhou Guirassy	Guinea	VfB Stuttgart*	Mainz 05	3–1	16 September 2023	
Harry Kane	England	Bayern Munich*	VfL Bochum	7–0	23 September 2023	
Serhou Guirassy	Guinea	VfB Stuttgart*	VfL Wolfsburg	3–1	7 October 2023	
Harry Kane	England	Bayern Munich*	Darmstadt 98	8–0	28 October 2023	
Harry Kane	England	Bayern Munich	Borussia Dortmund*	4–0	4 November 2023	
Patrik Schick	Czech Republic	Bayer Leverkusen*	VfL Bochum	4–0	20 December 2023	
Deniz Undav	Germany	VfB Stuttgart*	RB Leipzig	5–2	27 January 2024	
Niclas Füllkrug	Germany	Borussia Dortmund*	VfL Bochum	3–1	28 January 2024	
Harry Kane	England	Bayern Munich*	Mainz 05	8–1	9 March 2024	
Florian Wirtz	Germany	Bayer Leverkusen*	Werder Bremen	5–0	14 April 2024	
Robin Hack	Germany	Borussia Mönchengladbach	TSG Hoffenheim*	3–4	20 April 2024	
Andrej Kramarić	Croatia	TSG Hoffenheim*	Bayern Munich	4–2	18 May 2024	
Andrej Kramarić	Croatia	TSG Hoffenheim*	Holstein Kiel	3–2	24 August 2024	
Harry Kane	England	Bayern Munich	Holstein Kiel*	6–1	14 September 2024	
Jens Stage	Denmark	Werder Bremen	TSG Hoffenheim*	4–3	29 September 2024	
Harry Kane	England	Bayern Munich*	VfB Stuttgart	4–0	19 October 2024	
Harry Kane	England	Bayern Munich*	FC Augsburg	3–0	22 November 2024	
Patrik Schick	Czech Republic	Bayer Leverkusen*	1. FC Heidenheim	5–2	23 November 2024	
Patrik Schick^{4}	Czech Republic	Bayer Leverkusen*	SC Freiburg	5–1	21 December 2024	
Myron Boadu	Netherlands	VfL Bochum*	RB Leipzig	3–3	18 January 2025	
Alexis Claude-Maurice	France	FC Augsburg	Borussia Mönchengladbach*	3–0	22 February 2025	
Serhou Guirassy^{4}	Guinea	Borussia Dortmund*	Union Berlin	6–0	22 February 2025	
Alassane Pléa	France	Borussia Mönchengladbach	Werder Bremen*	4–2	15 March 2025	
Ermedin Demirović	Bosnia and Herzegovina	VfB Stuttgart	VfL Bochum*	4–0	5 April 2025	
Harry Kane	England	Bayern Munich*	RB Leipzig	6–0	22 August 2025	
Harry Kane	England	Bayern Munich	TSG Hoffenheim*	4–1	20 September 2025	
Oliver Burke	Scotland	Union Berlin	Eintracht Frankfurt*	4–3	21 September 2025	
Deniz Undav	Germany	VfB Stuttgart	Borussia Dortmund*	3–3	22 November 2025	
Harry Kane	England	Bayern Munich	VfB Stuttgart*	5–0	6 December 2025	
Yan Diomande	Ivory Coast	RB Leipzig*	Eintracht Frankfurt	6–0	6 December 2025	
Dženan Pejčinović	Germany	VfL Wolfsburg*	SC Freiburg	3–4	20 December 2025	
Andrej Kramarić	Croatia	TSG Hoffenheim*	Borussia Mönchengladbach	5–1	14 January 2026	
Luis Díaz	Colombia	Bayern Munich*	TSG Hoffenheim	5–1	8 February 2026	
Patrik Schick	Czech Republic	Bayer Leverkusen*	RB Leipzig	4–1	2 May 2026	
Harry Kane	England	Bayern Munich*	1. FC Köln	5–1	16 May 2026	
Younes Ebnoutalib	Germany	Eintracht Frankfurt	Union Berlin*	3–3	29 August 2026	
Yuito Suzuki	Japan	SC Freiburg*	Werder Bremen	4–1	30 August 2026	
Michael Olise	France	Bayern Munich*	Union Berlin	7–0	18 September 2026	
Christopher Nkunku	France	RB Leipzig*	Eintracht Frankfurt	6–0	10 October 2026	
Luis Díaz	Colombia	Bayern Munich*	RB Leipzig	6–1	17 October 2026	

== Multiple hat-tricks ==
The following table lists the number of hat-tricks scored by players who have scored two or more hat-tricks. Players in bold are still active in the Bundesliga. Players in italics are still active outside the Bundesliga.

Rank	Player	Hat-tricks
1	(West Germany) Gerd Müller	32
2	(Poland) Robert Lewandowski	16
3	(West Germany) Klaus Fischer	12
4	(West Germany) Jupp Heynckes	11
4	(England) **Harry Kane**	11
6	(West Germany) Manfred Burgsmüller	10
6	(Germany) Mario Gómez	10
8	(Croatia) **Andrej Kramarić**	6
8	(Peru) Claudio Pizarro	6
10	(Czech Republic) **Patrik Schick**	5
11	(Nigeria) Jonathan Akpoborie	4
11	(Iceland) Alfreð Finnbogason	4
11	(Netherlands) Klaas-Jan Huntelaar	4
11	(Netherlands) Arjen Robben	4
11	(Ghana) Tony Yeboah	4
16	(Turkey) Halil Altıntop	3
16	(Gabon) Pierre-Emerick Aubameyang	3
16	(Germany) **Niclas Füllkrug**	3
16	(Germany) **Serge Gnabry**	3
16	(Guinea) **Serhou Guirassy**	3
16	(Norway) Erling Haaland	3
16	(Bosnia and Herzegovina) Vedad Ibišević	3
16	(Germany) Max Kruse	3
16	(Spain) Raúl	3
16	(Germany) Marco Reus	3
16	(Netherlands) Wout Weghorst	3
16	(Germany) Timo Werner	3
28	(Paraguay) Lucas Barrios	2
28	(Bulgaria) Dimitar Berbatov	2
28	(Sweden) Martin Dahlin	2
28	(Colombia) **Luis Díaz**	2
28	(South Africa) Sean Dundee	2
28	(Bosnia and Herzegovina) **Edin Džeko**	2
28	(Romania) Ionel Ganea	2
28	(Brazil) Grafite	2
28	(Germany) Stefan Kießling	2
28	(France) Jean-Philippe Mateta	2
28	(Germany) Alexander Meier	2
28	(France) Anthony Modeste	2
28	(Germany) Thomas Müller	2
28	(Germany) Nils Petersen	2
28	(France) Alassane Pléa	2
28	(Finland) Joel Pohjanpalo	2
28	(Sweden) Robin Quaison	2
28	(South Korea) Son Heung-min	2
28	(Germany) **Deniz Undav**	2

== Hat-tricks by nationality ==
The following table lists the number of hat-tricks scored by players from a single nation.

Rank	Nation	Hat-tricks
1	Germany	129
2	Poland	19
3	Netherlands	13
4	England	12
5	France	10
6	Croatia	8
7	Czech Republic	7
8	Bosnia and Herzegovina	6
8	Denmark	6
8	Peru	6
11	Iceland	5
11	Switzerland	5
13	Ghana	4
13	Nigeria	4
13	Norway	4
13	Spain	4
17	Austria	3
17	Brazil	3
17	Bulgaria	3
17	Colombia	3
17	Gabon	3
17	Greece	3
17	Guinea	3
17	South Korea	3
17	Sweden	3
26	Turkey	2
26	Cameroon	2
26	Finland	2
26	Italy	2
26	Ivory Coast	2
26	Japan	2
26	Paraguay	2
26	Romania	2
26	Senegal	2
26	South Africa	2
36	Albania	1
36	Algeria	1
36	Argentina	1
36	Belgium	1
36	DR Congo	1
36	Egypt	1
36	Georgia	1
36	Hungary	1
36	Lebanon	1
36	Mali	1
36	Mexico	1
36	Portugal	1
36	Russia	1
36	Scotland	1
36	Serbia	1
36	Slovakia	1
36	Slovenia	1
36	Togo	1
36	Tunisia	1
36	Ukraine	1
36	United States	1

== Hat-tricks by club ==
The following table lists the number of hat-tricks scored by players from given club.

As of 17 October 2026

Europe League hat-tricks by club
Rank	Club	Hat-tricks	Last hat-trick
1	Bayern Munich	94	17 October 2026
2	Bayer Leverkusen	31	2 May 2026
3	Werder Bremen	29	29 September 2024
3	Borussia Dortmund	29	22 February 2025
5	Borussia Mönchengladbach	26	15 March 2025
5	Schalke 04	26	9 January 2021
5	VfB Stuttgart	26	22 November 2025
8	VfL Wolfsburg	18	20 December 2025
9	Eintracht Frankfurt	10	14 January 2026
9	SC Freiburg	10	29 August 2026
9	TSG Hoffenheim	10	30 August 2026
12	1. FC Kaiserslautern	9	17 December 2005
12	Hamburger SV	9	6 October 2013
14	Mainz 05	8	28 January 2023
15	Hertha BSC	7	4 November 2016
15	1. FC Köln	7	18 March 2017
15	1. FC Nürnberg	7	5 March 2011
18	FC Augsburg	6	22 February 2025
18	RB Leipzig	6	10 October 2026
18	1860 Munich	6	1 November 2003
21	Karlsruher SC	5	6 December 1997
22	Hannover 96	4	13 January 2018
23	VfL Bochum	3	18 January 2025
23	Union Berlin	3	21 September 2025
23	MSV Duisburg	3	29 May 1999
23	Fortuna Düsseldorf	3	9 November 2019
23	Hansa Rostock	3	10 November 2007
28	Arminia Bielefeld	2	23 April 2005
29	Dynamo Dresden	1	7 August 1993
29	Eintracht Braunschweig	1	15 February 2014
29	SpVgg Unterhaching	1	24 September 2000
29	SG Wattenscheid	1	18 September 1993
