= 1928–29 Manchester City F.C. season =

English football club season

Manchester City
1928–29 season
- Manager: Peter Hodge
- Stadium: Maine Road
- First Division: 8th
- FA Cup: Fifth Round
- Top goalscorer: League: Tommy Johnson (38); All: Tommy Johnson (38)
- Highest home attendance: 61,007 v Manchester United (1 September 1928)
- Lowest home attendance: 15,000 v Newcastle United (10 November 1928); 15,000 v Cardiff City (24 November 1928)

The 1928–29 season was Manchester City's 34th season of competitive football and 22nd season in the top division of English football. In addition to the First Division, the club competed in the FA Cup. Tommy Johnson scored 38 goals across all competitions in the season, a club record which wasn't beaten until the 2022-23 season by Erling Haaland. However, all 38 of his goals came in the league, which is still the club record for the most league goals scored in a season. In addition, City reached an average attendance of 31,715 over the season, the highest in the country.

== Football League First Division ==
=== League table ===
Pos	Team	Pld	W	D	L	GF	GA	GAv	Pts
6	Derby County	42	18	10	14	86	71	1.211	46
7	Blackburn Rovers	42	17	11	14	72	63	1.143	45
8	Manchester City	42	18	9	15	95	86	1.105	45
9	Arsenal	42	16	13	13	77	72	1.069	45
10	Newcastle United	42	19	6	17	70	72	0.972	44

Source: World Football
Rules for classification: 1) Points; 2) Goal average; 3) Goals scored

=== Results summary ===
Overall								Home						Away					
Pld	W	D	L	GF	GA	GAv	Pts	W	D	L	GF	GA	Pts	W	D	L	GF	GA	Pts
42	18	9	15	95	86	1.105	45	12	3	6	63	40	27	6	6	9	32	46	18

=== Reports ===
Date	Opponents	H / A	Venue	Result F – A	Scorers	Attendance
25 August 1928	Birmingham City	A	St Andrews	1 – 4	Tait	45,000
1 September 1928	Manchester United	H	Maine Road	2 - 2	Roberts, Johnson	61,007
5 September 1928	Portsmouth	A	Fratton Park	0 – 1		26,000
8 September 1928	Huddersfield Town	H	Maine Road	3 – 2	Johnson (2), Marshall	34,421
15 September 1928	Everton	A	Goodison Park	6- 2	Johnson (5), Brook	47,871
22 September 1928	Arsenal	H	Maine Road	4 – 1	Broadhurst (2), Tilson (2)	36,223
29 September 1928	Blackburn Rovers	A	Ewood Park	2-2	Tilson, Brook	25,430
1 October 1928	Portsmouth	H	Maine Road	2 – 1	Austin, Johnson	20,000
6 October 1928	Sunderland	H	Maine Road	5 – 3	Broadhurst, Barass, Johnson, Marshall, Brook	40,000
13 October 1928	Derby County	A	Baseball Ground	1 – 1	Brook	25,050
20 October 1928	Leeds United	A	Elland Road	1 – 4	Barass	32,866
27 October 1928	Leicester City	H	Maine Road	2 – 3	Roberts (2)	30,000
3 November 1928	West Ham United	A	Boleyn Ground	0 – 3		26,000
10 November 1928	Newcastle United	H	Maine Road	2 – 4	Johnson (2)	15,000
17 November 1928	Burnley	A	Turf Moor	3 – 2	Cowan, Roberts, Brooks	14,021
24 November 1928	Cardiff City	H	Maine Road	1 – 1	Broadhurst	15,000
1 December 1928	Sheffield United	A	Bramhall Lane	3 – 1	Johnson (2), Roberts	22,000
19 December 1928	Aston Villa	A	Villa Park	1 – 5	Roberts	13,002
22 December 1928	Liverpool	H	Maine Road	2 – 3	Bacon, Johnson	20,000
25 December 1928	Sheffield Wednesday	A	Hillsborough Stadium	0 – 4		45,000
26 December 1928	Sheffield Wednesday	H	Maine Road	2 – 2	Johnson (2)	55,000
29 December 1928	Birmingham City	H	Maine Road	2 – 3	Marshall, Johnson	35,000
5 January 1929	Manchester United	A	Old Trafford	2 – 1	Austin, Johnson	42,555
19 January 1929	Huddersfield Town	A	Leeds Road	2 – 2	Tait, Brook	15,000
26 January 1929	Everton	H	Maine Road	5 – 1	Tilson (2), Austin, Brook	36,241
30 January 1929	Bury	H	Maine Road	6 - 4	Johnson (2), Tait, Brook, Tilson, Austin	20,000
2 February 1929	Arsenal	A	Highbury	0 – 0		13,764
9 February 1929	Blackburn Rovers	H	Maine Road	1 – 2	Johnson	33,801
16 February 1929	Sunderland	A	Roker Park	1 – 3	Johnson	10,000
23 February 1929	Derby County	H	Maine Road	2 – 3	Johnson (2)	27,941
2 March 1929	Leeds United	H	Maine Road	3 – 0	Johnson, Tilson, Brook	33,921
9 March 1929	Leicester City	A	Filbert Street	2 – 3	Johnson, Tilson	15,000
16 March 1929	West Ham United	H	Maine Road	4 – 2	Brook (2), Johnson, Austin	30,000
23 March 1929	Newcastle United	A	Maine Road	0 – 4		25,000
29 March 1929	Birmingham City	H	Maine Road	5 – 1	Johnson (3), Marshall, Tilson	45,838
30 March 1929	Burnley	H	Maine Road	4 – 1	Johnson (2), Marshall, Brook	33,166
1 April 1929	Bolton Wanderers	A	Burnden Park	1 – 1	Marshall	21,955
6 April 1929	Cardiff City	A	Ninian Park	3 – 1	Johnson (2), Tilson	10,000
13 April 1929	Sheffield United	H	Maine Road	3 – 1	Marshall, Tilson, Brook	20,000
20 April 1929	Bury	A	Gigg Lane	2 – 1	Johnson, Tilson	15,000
27 April 1929	Aston Villa	H	Maine Road	3 – 0	Toseland, Johnson, Brook	25,000
4 May 1929	Liverpool	A	Anfield	1 – 1	Johnson	25,000

=== FA Cup ===
Date	Round	Opponents	H / A	Venue	Result F – A	Scorers	Attendance
12 January 1929	Third round	Birmingham City	A	St Andrews	1 – 3	Austin	25,005
