= Erling Haaland =

Norwegian footballer (born 2000)

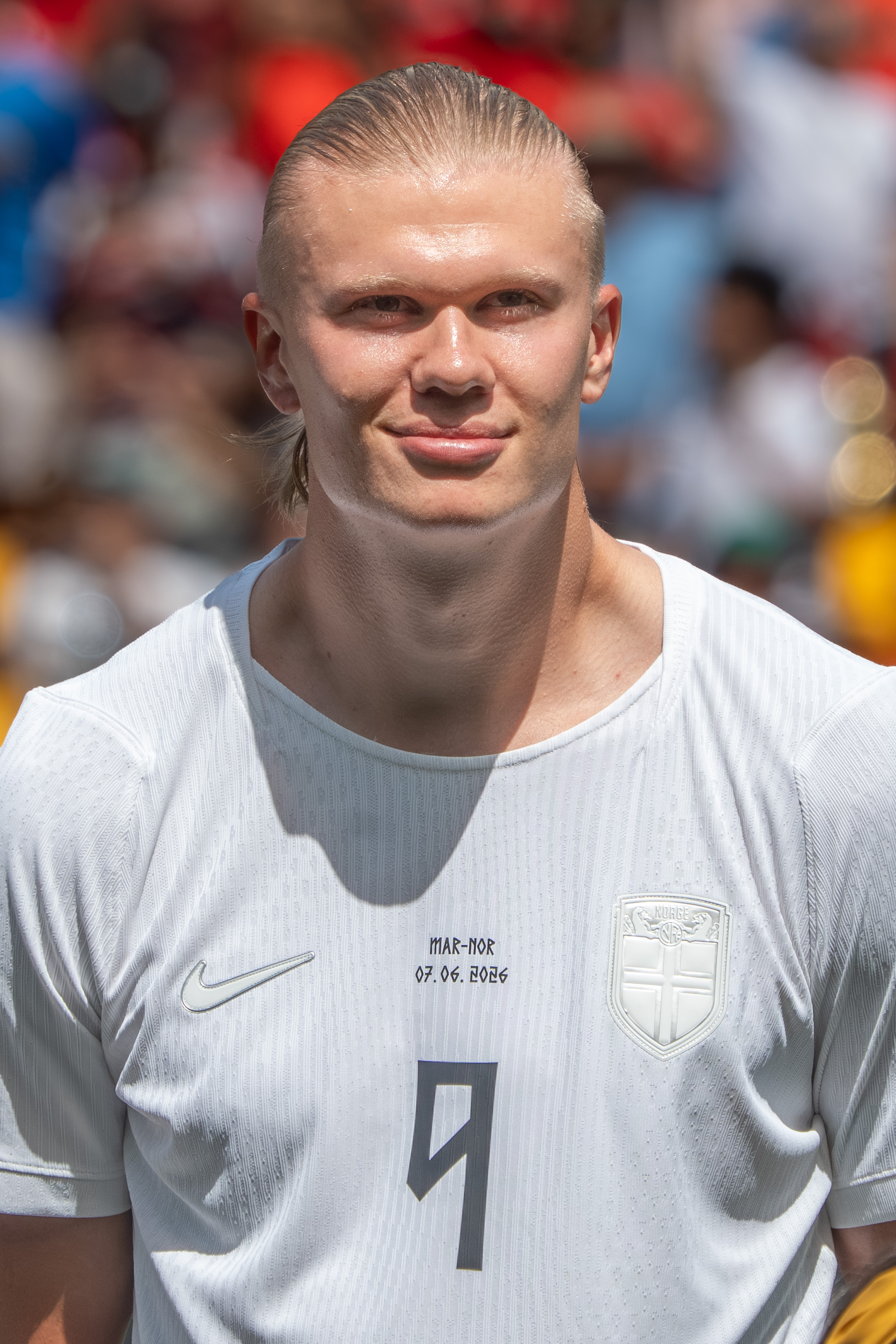
- Haaland with Norway in 2026

Personal information
- Full name: Erling Braut Haaland
- Date of birth: 21 July 2000 (age 26)
- Place of birth: Leeds, West Yorkshire, England
- Height: 1.95 m (6 ft 5 in)
- Position: Striker

Team information
- Current team: Manchester City
- Number: 9

Youth career
- 2005–2016: Bryne

Senior career*
Years	Team	Apps	(Gls)
2015–2016	Bryne 2	18	(18)
2016–2017	Bryne	16	(0)
2017–2018	Molde 2	4	(2)
2017–2019	Molde	39	(14)
2019–2020	Red Bull Salzburg	16	(17)
2020–2022	Borussia Dortmund	67	(62)
2022–	Manchester City	143	(121)

International career^{‡}
2015	Norway U15	4	(4)
2016	Norway U16	17	(1)
2017	Norway U17	5	(2)
2017	Norway U18	6	(6)
2018	Norway U19	6	(6)
2019	Norway U20	5	(11)
2018	Norway U21	3	(0)
2019–	Norway	61	(68)
- * Club domestic league appearances and goals as of 23:53, 21 November 2026 (UTC) ‡ National team caps and goals as of 21:55, 17 November 2026 (UTC)

Erling Braut Haaland (Note: Also spelled Erling Braut Håland) (born 21 July 2000) is a Norwegian professional footballer who plays as a striker for Premier League club Manchester City and the Norway national team. Widely regarded as one of the best players in the world and the greatest Norwegian player of all time, he is known for his speed, strength, positioning, and finishing ability, especially from inside the penalty area.

Haaland began his senior career with Norwegian clubs Bryne and Molde before signing in 2019 for Red Bull Salzburg, where he won the Austrian Bundesliga and Austrian Cup. His performances in the UEFA Champions League earned him a move in 2020 to Bundesliga club Borussia Dortmund, where he won the DFB-Pokal in 2021 and was named Bundesliga Player of the Season. In 2022, Haaland joined Manchester City for a fee of €60 million (£51.2 million) and played a pivotal role in the club's treble-winning debut season, becoming only the second English club to achieve the feat. He finished as the top scorer in the Premier League, FA Cup and Champions League, setting records for the most goals in a Premier League season (36) and the most goals by a Premier League player in all competitions in a single season (52). At City, he has won two Premier League titles and three Premier League Golden Boots.

Haaland's individual honours include the PFA Players' Player of the Year, the UEFA Men's Player of the Year, the IFFHS World's Best Player and the Golden Boy awards, while he also finished runner-up for the Ballon d'Or. He is the only player to win the awards for Premier League Young Player and Player of the Season in the same season. He is also the quickest Premier League player to score eight hat-tricks. He was included in the FIFPRO World 11 for 2021, 2022, 2023, 2024, and 2026.

Haaland represented Norway at the youth level, winning the Golden Boot at the 2019 FIFA U-20 World Cup, where he scored a record nine goals in a single match. He made his senior international debut for Norway in 2019, and has since scored over 60 goals, making him Norway's all-time top goalscorer. Haaland is the sixth player to reach 50 international goals in under 50 appearances, doing so in 46 games. At the 2026 FIFA World Cup, Haaland was named in the Dream XI as he helped Norway reach the quarter-finals—the nation's best-ever World Cup finish—scoring seven goals. Haaland finished eight in the voting for the 2026 Ballon d'Or.

== Early life ==
Erling Braut Haaland was born on 21 July 2000 in Leeds, West Yorkshire, England, while his father Alf-Inge Haaland was playing football for Leeds United. As a result, Haaland grew up as a supporter of Leeds. In 2004, at age three, he moved to Bryne, his parents' hometown in Norway. His mother, Gry Marita Braut, was a national heptathlon champion in Norway in the 1990s. In addition to football, Haaland participated in various other sports as a child, including handball, golf, and track and field. He also reportedly achieved a world record in his age category for the standing long jump when he was five, with a recorded distance of 1.63 metres (5 ft 4 in).

== Club career ==
=== Bryne ===
Haaland started playing at the academy of his hometown club Bryne at the age of five. Five of the players from this youth team went on play on Norway youth national teams. During the 2015 and 2016 seasons, he played for Bryne 2 (Bryne's reserve team) in the Norwegian fourth tier, scoring 18 goals in 18 matches. The following season he scored his first career hat-trick at the age of 16. In May 2016, Gaute Larsen was fired as Bryne manager, and youth coach Berntsen was promoted to caretaker manager. Having worked closely with Haaland in other youth teams, the interim manager handed the teenager his first start, three months before his 16th birthday. His first game with Bryne FK was a second-tier 1. divisjon match against Ranheim on 12 May.

After initially being deployed as a winger, Berntsen put Haaland in his favoured central role as a striker after a few matches. Although he failed to score in his breakthrough season at Bryne, Haaland was offered a trial by German club TSG Hoffenheim before eventually moving to Molde to play under Ole Gunnar Solskjær. Haaland made 16 senior appearances for Bryne.

=== Molde ===
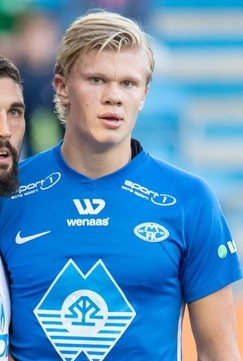
Haaland playing for Molde in 2018

On 1 February 2017, Molde announced the signing of the 16-year-old Haaland. He made his debut for the club on 26 April in a Norwegian Cup match against Volda TI, scoring once in a 3–2 win. Haaland's debut in the Eliteserien came on 4 June. He came on as a substitute in the 71st minute against Sarpsborg 08, and he received a yellow card within two minutes. On 6 August, Haaland scored the winning goal against Tromsø IL, his first goal in the league. On 17 September, he scored the winning goal as Molde defeated Viking FK 3–2. After the game, Haaland received criticism from his teammate Björn Bergmann Sigurðarson for celebrating his goal towards Viking supporters in a "provoking" manner. Haaland finished his first season at Molde with four goals in 20 appearances.

On 1 July 2018, Haaland scored four goals in the opening 21 minutes against Brann, securing his team a 4–0 victory over the unbeaten league leaders at the time. After the match, Molde manager Ole Gunnar Solskjær compared Haaland's style of play to Belgian forward Romelu Lukaku, and said the club had rejected several bids for the striker from different clubs. In the following match a week later, Haaland continued his scoring run with two goals against Vålerenga in a 5–1 win. He scored his first goal in UEFA competition on 26 July, converting a penalty in Molde's 3–0 Europa League qualifying victory against KF Laçi. Due to a sprained ankle, Haaland did not participate in Molde's last three league matches of the season. For his performances in the 2018 Eliteserien, Haaland received the Eliteserien Breakthrough of the Year award. He finished the 2018 season as Molde's top goalscorer, scoring 16 goals in 30 matches across all competitions.

=== Red Bull Salzburg ===
On 19 August 2018, Austrian Bundesliga champions Red Bull Salzburg announced that Haaland would join the club on 1 January 2019, signing a five-year contract. The Athletic's Phil Hay would later reveal that prior to his move to Salzburg, Haaland was also subject of an offer from his father's former club Leeds United. He made his debut for the club on 17 February, the 2018–19 Austrian Cup quarter-finals against Wiener Neustadt, and scored his first goal on 12 May in the Austrian Bundesliga 2–1 win over LASK.

On 19 July, he scored his first hat-trick for the club in a 7–1 Austrian Cup win against SC-ESV Parndorf, and followed this up with his first hat-trick in the league on 10 August, scoring three in a 5–2 victory against Wolfsberger AC. He got a third hat-trick for Salzburg on 14 September in a 7–2 victory over TSV Hartberg; this was the sixth consecutive league game Haaland had scored in, with 11 total goals. Three days later, Haaland made his debut in the UEFA Champions League against Genk, where he scored three goals in the first half of an eventual 6–2 victory, his fourth overall hat-trick for Salzburg, becoming the only player to score a first-half hat-trick on competition debut.

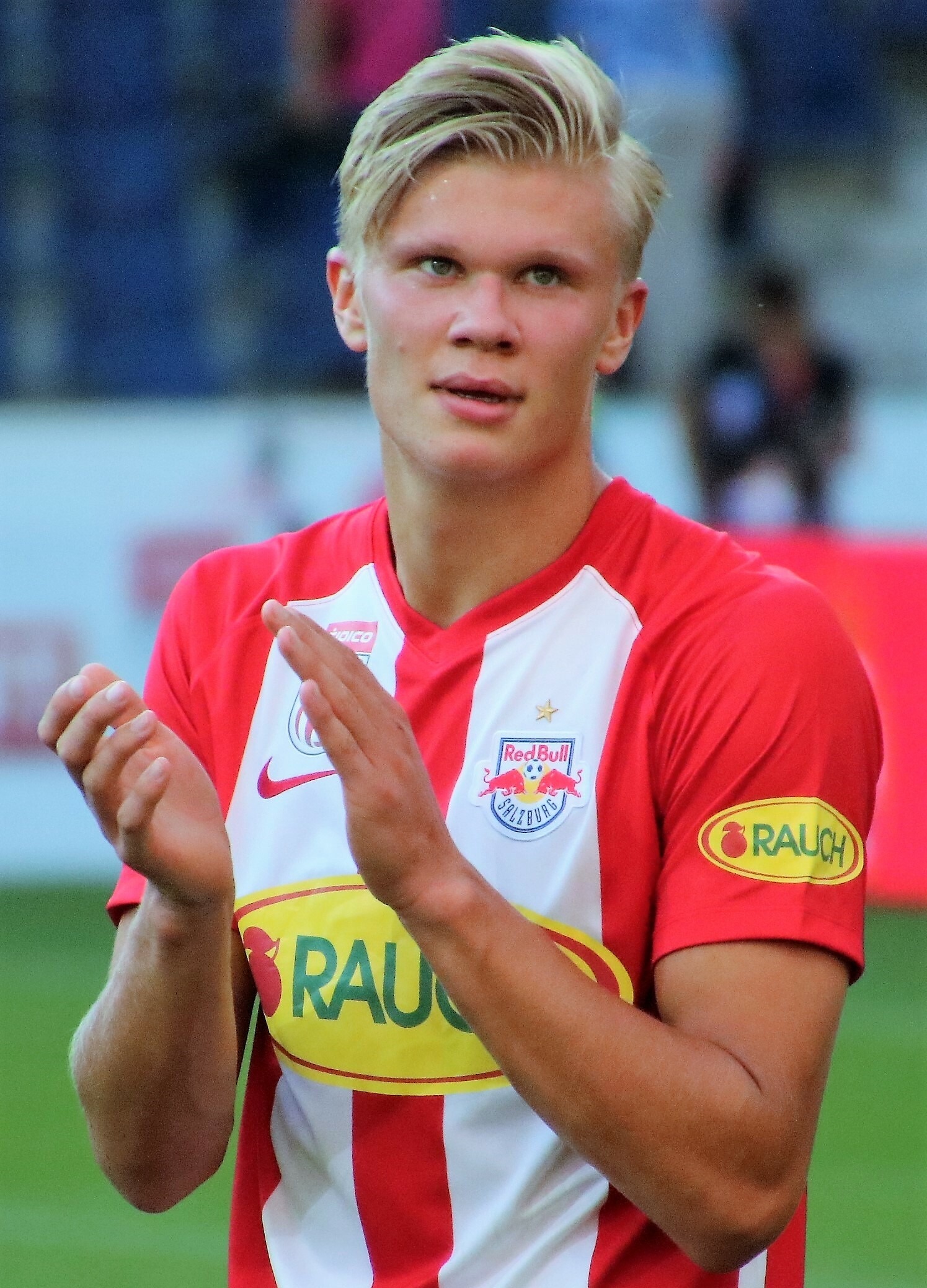
Haaland playing for Red Bull Salzburg in 2019

In his next two matches of the Champions League season, Haaland recorded a goal against Liverpool at Anfield and a further two against Napoli, becoming only the second teenager after Karim Benzema in the history of the competition to score in each of his first three appearances. His six goals were also the most scored by any player in their first three Champions League matches. After converting a penalty in Salzburg's reverse fixture against Napoli, Haaland became the first teenager to score in his first four matches in the competition, and only the fourth player of any age to achieve this feat, following Zé Carlos, Alessandro Del Piero and Diego Costa. He then scored all three goals in Salzburg's 3–0 victory at Wolfsberger AC on 10 November, recording his fifth hat-trick of the season and his second against the club.

On 27 November, Haaland came off the bench to score another goal against Genk, joining Del Piero, Serhiy Rebrov, Neymar, Cristiano Ronaldo and Robert Lewandowski as the only players to score in the first five matches of a Champions League group stage, and becoming the first teenager to score in five consecutive matches in the competition. However, he would fail to find the net in Salzburg's final group match against Liverpool, as his team lost 2–0 and were eliminated from the competition. This would prove to be Haaland's final game for the club; he departed Salzburg having recorded 29 goals, with 28 of these coming in only 22 appearances made during the 2019–20 season.

=== Borussia Dortmund ===
==== 2019–20: Debut season ====
Despite being a reported target of Manchester United and Juventus, Bundesliga club Borussia Dortmund confirmed the signing of Haaland on 29 December 2019, three days before the winter transfer window opened, for a fee reported to be in the region of €20 million, signing a four-and-a-half-year contract.

Haaland made his debut for Dortmund away to FC Augsburg on 18 January 2020, coming on as a second-half substitute and scoring a hat-trick within 23 minutes in a 5–3 win. This made him only the second player in Dortmund history after Pierre-Emerick Aubameyang to score three goals on their Bundesliga debut. Six days later, Haaland once again came off the bench, making his second club appearance in Dortmund's match against FC Köln. He scored after 12 minutes and netted a second goal 10 minutes later, contributing to a 5–1 victory. Haaland became the first Bundesliga player to score five goals in his opening two matches, as well as the fastest player to reach that tally (56 minutes played). Despite being on the pitch in the league for only an hour, he won January's Bundesliga Player of the Month award. Haaland scored twice against Union Berlin on 1 February, becoming the first player in history to score seven goals in their first three Bundesliga matches.

On 18 February, Haaland scored both Dortmund goals in their 2–1 first leg victory over Paris Saint-Germain in the Champions League round of 16. This brought his total to 10 Champions League goals for the 2019–20 campaign in only his eighth appearance in the competition, including the eight he had scored for Salzburg in the group stage. Dortmund lost 2–0 in the return leg on 11 March, as Haaland saw elimination from the competition for a second time in the same season. Following the Bundesliga's return on 16 May in the midst of the ongoing COVID-19 pandemic, Haaland scored Dortmund's opener of their 4–0 Revierderby win over Schalke 04, his tenth goal of the Bundesliga season. On 20 June, he scored both goals in a 2–0 win against RB Leipzig to secure second place for Dortmund, which would lead to Champions League football in the following season. Haaland concluded his 2019–20 campaign with 44 goals in 40 club appearances across all competitions played for both Salzburg and Dortmund.

==== 2020–21: UCL top scorer and DFB-Pokal title ====
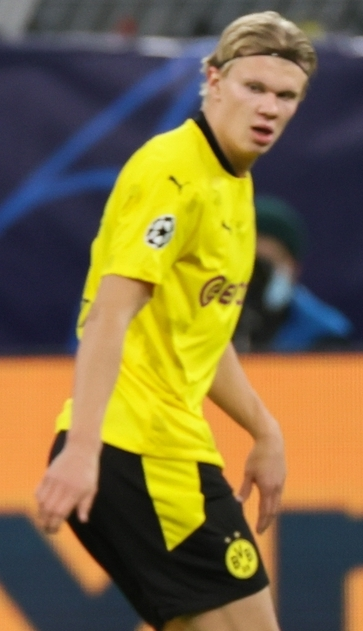
Haaland playing for Borussia Dortmund in 2020

On 19 September 2020, in Dortmund's first match of the new season, Haaland scored two goals in a 3–0 win over Borussia Mönchengladbach. He scored his team's equaliser in their 2–3 Der Klassiker defeat to Bayern Munich in the DFL-Supercup on 30 September, and again found the net against Bayern when the sides met in the league on 7 November, with Dortmund losing 2–3 once more. On 21 November, Haaland scored four goals in 32 minutes of a 5–2 away victory against Hertha BSC. These five goals in November saw him crowned the Bundesliga Player of the Month for a second time.

Haaland scored six times in the first four matches of the 2020–21 group stage of the Champions League, with his two goals in a 3–0 win over Club Brugge on 24 November making him the fastest player to record 15 Champions League goals; he had reached this benchmark in 12 matches. Hours before Dortmund's fifth group match against Lazio on 2 December, however, the club announced that Haaland had suffered a hamstring injury, which kept him out of action until after the new year.

Haaland made his return against VfL Wolfsburg on 3 January 2021. He scored two goals away against RB Leipzig in a 3–1 win on 9 January, and another two in a 4–2 defeat to Mönchengladbach on 22 January. On 17 February, he scored two goals in Dortmund's 3–2 away victory against Sevilla in the first leg of the Champions League round of 16. In Dortmund's reverse league fixture against Bayern at the Allianz Arena on 6 March, Haaland scored twice within the opening 10 minutes to give his team a 2–0 lead. However, he was substituted off in the second half after picking up a knock, as Bayern rallied to win the match 4–2. Haaland's second goal was the 100th of his senior career, reaching this milestone in 146 appearances.

Haaland scored another two goals against Sevilla in the second leg on 9 March in a 2–2 draw, advancing to the quarter-finals 5–4 on aggregate. With only 14 matches played, this made him both the fastest and youngest player to reach 20 goals in the competition, also becoming the first player to score multiple times in four consecutive Champions League appearances. After missing two matches due to deep bruising, Haaland returned to Dortmund's starting line-up on 13 May for the 2021 DFB-Pokal final; he scored twice in his team's 4–1 win over Leipzig, securing his first title with the club. He ended the season with 41 goals in all competitions, including 27 in the league, which won him the fan-voted Bundesliga Player of the Season award, and finished the season as the top scorer of the Champions League with 10 goals, later being awarded the competition's best forward.

==== 2021–22: Injury struggles and departure ====
Haaland started off the 2021–22 season with a hat-trick versus Wehen Wiesbaden in the first round of the DFB-Pokal on 7 August 2021. A week later, on matchday one of the Bundesliga, he scored two and assisted two goals as Dortmund beat Eintracht Frankfurt 5–2. During the first months of the season, Haaland was sidelined with a hamstring injury, returning on 16 October and scoring a brace against Mainz in a 3–1 victory. Shortly after, Haaland suffered a hip flexor injury, which sidelined him for two months. He made his return on 27 November, scoring his 50th Bundesliga goal in a 3–1 victory over Wolfsburg, setting a new record for the fewest appearances and also became the youngest player to score 50 league goals.

On 10 May, Dortmund announced that Haaland would be leaving at the end of the season to sign for Premier League club Manchester City. Four days later, he bid farewell to the club at the Westfalenstadion prior to Dortmund's final match against Hertha BSC, and scored Dortmund's first goal in a 2–1 win.

=== Manchester City ===
==== 2022–23: Record-breaking debut season and continental treble ====
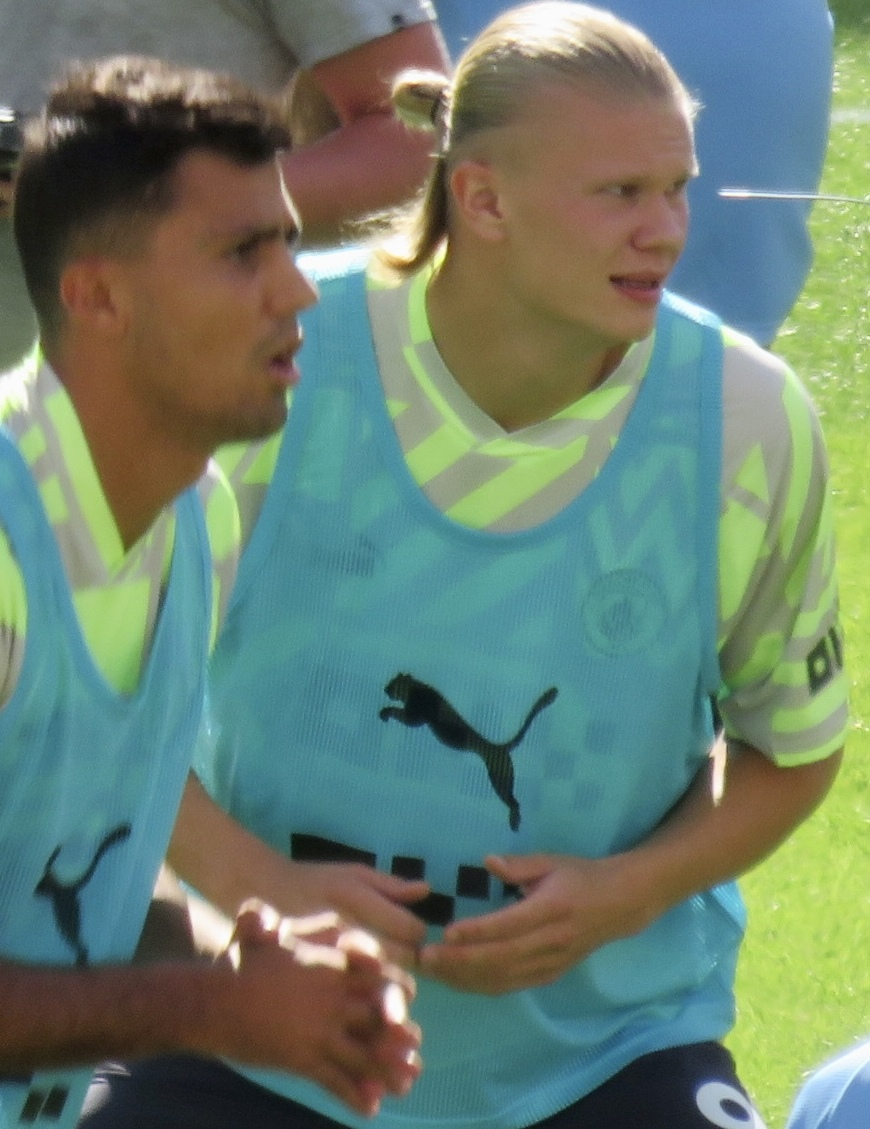
Haaland (right) warming up before a Premier League match against West Ham United in August 2022

On 10 May 2022, Premier League club Manchester City announced they had reached a deal to sign Haaland after activating his €60 million (£51.2 million) release clause. The deal was formalised on 13 June, with City confirming that Haaland would be joining the club on 1 July on a five-year contract. Haaland scored in his first appearance for the club in a preseason friendly against Bayern Munich at Lambeau Field in Green Bay, Wisconsin, on 23 July 2022. It was the only goal of the game. He made his competitive debut seven days later, playing 90 minutes of a 3–1 defeat to Liverpool in the 2022 FA Community Shield.

Haaland scored twice on his league debut against West Ham United on 7 August 2022, the only goals of a 2–0 away victory. On 27 August, he scored his first Premier League hat-trick in a 4–2 win against Crystal Palace, and recorded his second, a perfect hat-trick, four days later in a 6–0 win against Nottingham Forest. This made Haaland the fastest individual in Premier League history to score two hat-tricks, beating the previous record by 14 matches; he was later voted Premier League Player of the Month for August, his first month playing in the league.

On 6 September, Haaland made his Champions League debut for the club, scoring twice against Sevilla and becoming the first player to score 25 goals in their first 20 Champions League appearances. He became the first player to score more than one goal on competition debut for three different clubs. In City's second group stage match a week later against his former club Borussia Dortmund, Haaland scored an acrobatic effort late in the contest to secure his side a 2–1 comeback victory. His winner was subsequently voted Champions League Goal of the Week by fans, and would later go on to be selected as the competition's Goal of the Season by UEFA's Technical Observer panel.

On 2 October, Haaland became the first player in Premier League history to score a hat-trick in three successive home matches during City's 6–3 derby win against Manchester United, additionally earning two assists. He also became the quickest player in Premier League history to score three hat-tricks, doing so in eight league matches and surpassing the previous record of 48 set by Michael Owen in 1998, as well as halving Alan Shearer's record of scoring three hat-tricks in a ten-match spell set during the 1994–95 season. Haaland's two goals in City's 3–1 away win over Leeds United on 28 December took his tally to 20 goals in 14 league matches, becoming the fastest player in history to reach 20 Premier League goals and beating Sunderland's Kevin Phillips' previous record by seven matches. On 22 January 2023, he scored a fourth hat-trick of the season against Wolverhampton Wanderers, giving him a total of 25 Premier League goals after just 19 matches; this surpassed the top scorers of the previous season, Mohamed Salah and Son Heung-min, who both scored 23 league goals across the entire campaign.

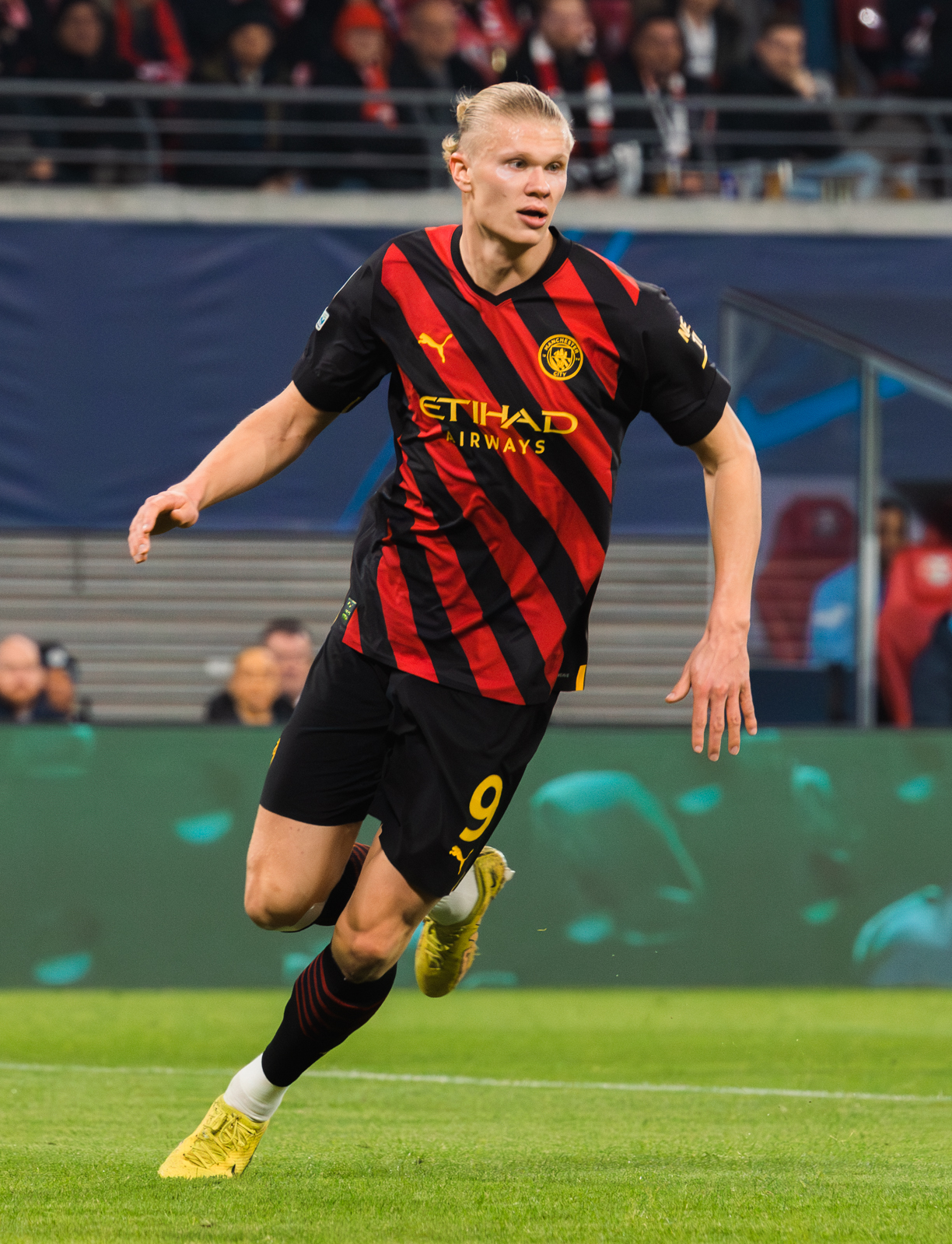
Haaland playing against RB Leipzig in a UEFA Champions League match in February 2023

On 14 March, Haaland scored five goals in a 7–0 round of 16 victory against RB Leipzig, tying Lionel Messi and Luiz Adriano for the most goals scored in a single Champions League match. He also set the new record for fastest time to score five goals in a Champions League match (57 minutes). In doing so, he reached 39 goals across all competitions, breaking Tommy Johnson's club record of 38 goals scored in a single season for City set in 1928–29. During City's FA Cup quarter-final match against Burnley four days later, Haaland scored his sixth hat-trick of the season, passing the 40-goal mark across all competitions.

On 11 April, Haaland scored the third goal of City's 3–0 Champions League win against Bayern Munich in the quarter-finals, his 45th goal of the season overall. This broke the previous record of 44 goals across all competitions in a season by a Premier League player held by Salah and Ruud van Nistelrooy. Haaland registered two assists and a goal in his side's 4–1 home victory against league leaders Arsenal on 26 April, closing the gap between them and City in the table to just two points while the latter still had two matches in hand. He would then score his 50th goal of the campaign across all competitions on 30 April against Fulham. His six goals and two assists during April saw him win the league's Player of the Month for a second time.

On 3 May, in City's return fixture against West Ham, Haaland scored his 35th league goal of the campaign, surpassing Shearer and Andy Cole's joint record for the most goals scored in a single Premier League season. A week later, he was named FWA Footballer of the Year. He won by a record margin, earning 82% of the vote ahead of Arsenal's Bukayo Saka and Martin Ødegaard and becoming only the fourth player to claim the award in their debut season. He would also go on to be voted PFA Players' Player of the Year by his colleagues in August. Haaland won his first trophy with Manchester City after they clinched the 2022–23 Premier League title on 20 May. By assisting Phil Foden's goal in a draw against Brighton & Hove Albion on 24 May, he reached 44 combined league goals and assists, thereby equalling Thierry Henry's record for most total goal contributions in a 38-game Premier League season. Haaland's debut season in England earned him the Premier League Golden Boot, after finishing as the league's top goalscorer, and the European Golden Shoe, given to the top domestic scorer in Europe. With 36 goals in 35 appearances, he set the new record for highest number of goals scored in a Premier League season. With 52 goals in 53 appearances, Haaland also set the record for most goals by a Premier League player in all competitions in one season.

Haaland played the entirety of City's FA Cup final victory over Manchester United on 3 June, securing his second title with the club. He then played another 90 minutes in the following week's Champions League final against Inter Milan. Despite Haaland struggling to have a large impact on the match, City would win 1–0 to earn a maiden Champions League title and achieve only the second-ever continental treble by an English side. With 12 goals, Haaland finished as the top scorer of the Champions League season for a second time, joining Messi as the only players to accomplish this feat twice before turning 23. Haaland would be subsequently named the UEFA Men's Player of the Year in August, ahead of Messi and Manchester City teammate Kevin De Bruyne.

==== 2023–24: Second consecutive Premier League Golden Boot ====
Manchester City began their 2023–24 Premier League season on 11 August 2023, with Haaland scoring a brace in a 3–0 away win against newly promoted team Burnley. Just days later, Haaland would win his first trophy of the season following City's victory over Europa League winners Sevilla in the UEFA Super Cup; although not scoring during the match, he did convert the first penalty in the shoot-out following the end of regulation. On 29 August, Haaland was named the PFA Players' Player of the Year, having earlier been included in the PFA Team of the Year for the Premier League.

With his first three goals of the season, Haaland became the fastest player to reach 100 league goals in Europe's top 5 leagues, accomplishing the feat in just 103 appearances, surpassing the previous record of 100 goals in 133 appearances set by Ronaldo.

Haaland preparing to strike the ball against RB Leipzig in the Champions League in October 2023

After registering a seventh club hat-trick plus an assist against Fulham on 2 September, Haaland became the fastest ever player to achieve 50 Premier League goal involvements (goals plus assists); with just 39 appearances in the competition, he eclipsed Andy Cole's previous record by four matches. On 25 October, Haaland scored his first two Champions League goals of the season in a 3–1 win at Young Boys. On 29 October, he recorded two goals and one assist in a 3–0 derby win over Manchester United at Old Trafford. The following day, he was presented with the Gerd Müller Trophy at the 2023 Ballon d'Or awards ceremony, given to the player with the most goals scored for club and country across a single season. On 25 November, Haaland became the fastest player to score 50 Premier League goals in a 1–1 draw with Liverpool; with just 48 appearances, he comfortably beat the previous record of 65 matches by Andy Cole. After suffering a bone stress injury in his foot in early December, Haaland would miss nearly two months of action, including City's victory at the 2023 FIFA Club World Cup, and would not return to the pitch until the end of January 2024.

On 20 February 2024, Haaland scored the sole goal of a home win over Brentford, joining Harry Kane as the only players to have scored against every Premier League team they had faced. A week later, he netted five goals in a 6–2 victory against Luton Town in the FA Cup, marking the second time he achieved such a feat for the club and becoming the first player to do so twice. Additionally, he matched his club's record for most goals by an individual in an FA Cup match, a record previously held by Frank Roberts in 1926 and Bobby Marshall in 1930. Furthermore, Haaland's accomplishment marked the first instance of a player scoring five goals in the competition since George Best in 1970. On 4 May, Haaland scored four goals in a 5–1 win over Wolverhampton Wanderers, his first league hat-trick of the year and third of the season in all competitions.

Haaland scored both goals in City's 2–0 vital win away to Tottenham Hotspur on 14 May, bringing his side back to the top of the Premier League table with one match remaining. Five days later, City would successfully defend their title following a 3–1 victory against West Ham. Haaland also secured a second consecutive Premier League Golden Boot, with 27 goals in 31 matches. However, he would be unable to retain the FA Cup, failing to score in City's 2–1 final rematch defeat to Manchester United on 25 May.

==== 2024–25: Further goalscoring records ====
Haaland during pre season in Cary, North Carolina, in July 2024

After failing to score in City's opening 2024 Community Shield victory over Manchester United, but having successfully converted his penalty in the shoot-out, Haaland scored the club's first goal of the league season in a 2–0 victory at Chelsea on 18 August 2024, in what was his 100th appearance for City. On 25 August, Haaland netted his first hat-trick of the season with the help of a penalty in a 4–1 victory against newly promoted Ipswich Town, his seventh Premier League hat-trick. In the following match on 31 August against West Ham United, he recorded another hat-trick in a 3–1 away victory, tying Harry Kane as the active player with the most Premier League hat-tricks, with eight. Haaland's hat-trick against the Hammers also allowed Manchester City to surpass Liverpool as the club with the most hat-tricks in the Premier League. Haaland's seven goals after three matches broke the record of six set by former City player Edin Džeko, for the most goals in the first three Premier League matches of a season; he also became the first player to score two hat-tricks in a team's first three league matches since Paul Jewell of Bradford City in the 1994–95 season. On 14 September, Haaland scored another two goals in a 2–1 victory over Brentford, eclipsing Wayne Rooney's record tally of eight goals in the first four matches of a Premier League season achieved with Manchester United in the 2011–12 season, after only deciding to play the day before following the death of a close family friend. On 22 September, Haaland matched Cristiano Ronaldo's record of 100 goals for a single club in competitive matches in Europe's top five leagues, when he scored during a 2–2 draw against Arsenal.

Haaland on the ball against Paris Saint-Germain in a Champions League match in January 2025

On 17 January 2025, Haaland signed to extend his contract with the club until 2034, while his previous deal was due to expire in 2027. The deal is the longest in Premier League history, with Haaland reportedly earning £500,000 per week with this new agreement. Following former club captain Kyle Walker's loan departure, Haaland was nominated to take up the captaincy by manager Pep Guardiola. He debuted as captain on 15 February, in a 4–0 win over Newcastle United. After scoring against Brighton & Hove Albion on 15 March, Haaland overtook Alan Shearer to become the fastest player to reach 100 goal involvements in the Premier League, doing so in 94 matches.

During City's FA Cup quarter-final match against Bournemouth, Haaland battled for the ball with Lewis Cook, and ended up colliding into the electronic advertising boards. This resulted in him injuring his ankle and missing a number of matches, making his return on 10 May in a goalless draw against already relegated Southampton. On 17 May, in the FA Cup final against Crystal Place, Haaland turned down the opportunity to take a penalty, instead handing the ball to Omar Marmoush, whose effort was saved by Dean Henderson. At the time, City were losing 1–0, and Palace would see the game out in the second half to win the first ever trophy in their history. Haaland finished the Premier League season with 22 goals, behind Mohamed Salah and Alexander Isak, scoring on the final day in a 2–0 win over Fulham.

On 26 June, Haaland scored his 300th career goal in a 5–2 win over Juventus in a FIFA Club World Cup group stage match. In the following match in the round of 16 on 30 June, he scored once in a 4–3 loss to Al Hilal, matching Lionel Messi's record of 56 goals in official international club competitions before the age of 25.

==== 2025–26: Third Golden Boot and 100th Premier League goal ====
On 16 August 2025, Haaland scored twice in City's first match of the 2025–26 Premier League, helping his team to a 4–0 away victory against Wolverhampton Wanderers. On 31 August, Haaland scored against Brighton & Hove Albion, and became the player with the most goals (88) in his first 100 matches in the Premier League, surpassing Alan Shearer's record of 79 goals. On 14 September, he scored a brace in City's 3–0 home win in the Manchester derby. Four days later, he scored the first goal in City's opening match in the 2025–26 UEFA Champions League, a 2–0 home victory against Napoli, becoming the fastest player to reach 50 goals in the competition, having done so in only 49 matches. On 2 December, Haaland became the fastest player to reach 100 goals in the Premier League, scoring in a 5–4 away win over Fulham. He achieved the milestone in just 111 appearances, surpassing Alan Shearer's 1995 record set after 124 matches. On 8 February 2026, he converted a stoppage-time penalty in a 2–1 away victory over Liverpool, securing his club's first league double over them since the 1936–37 season. He concluded the season with 27 goals, securing his third Golden Boot award and matching the tally of both Harry Kane and Alan Shearer.

==== 2026–27 ====
On 23 August 2026, Haaland made his 200th appearance for the club in a 2–1 victory over Bournemouth. On 28 August, he scored his first goals of the season, netting twice in a 4–1 win away at Crystal Palace.

== International career ==
=== 2015–2018: Youth level ===
Haaland plays for Norway, and has represented them at various age groups. On 27 March 2018, while with the Norway under-19 side, Haaland scored a hat-trick against Scotland in a 5–4 victory, helping his country secure qualification to the 2018 UEFA European Under-19 Championship. On 22 July 2018, Haaland scored a penalty against Italy in a 1–1 draw during the tournament finals. On 30 May 2019, Haaland scored nine goals in the Norway under-20 team's 12–0 win against Honduras at the 2019 FIFA U-20 World Cup in Lublin, Poland. This was Norway's biggest ever win at U-20 level, as well as Honduras' heaviest ever defeat. Haaland also set a new U-20 World Cup record for most goals scored by a single player in a match, with the result additionally being the biggest win by any team in the history of the tournament. Despite the Norwegians being eliminated in the group stage, and Haaland not scoring in any other matches at the tournament, he still won the Golden Boot as the competition's top scorer.

=== 2019–2021: Senior debut and first major tournament ===
Born in Leeds, Haaland was eligible to play for England, but only wished to play for Norway according to coach Gareth Southgate.

On 28 August 2019, Haaland was named by manager Lars Lagerbäck to the Norway senior team squad to face Malta and Sweden in UEFA Euro 2020 qualifying matches, debuting on 5 September 2019 against the former opponent. On 4 September 2020, Haaland scored his first senior international goal for Norway in a 1–2 loss against Austria in the 2020–21 UEFA Nations League B. Three days later, he scored two goals in a 5–1 victory against Northern Ireland.

On 11 October, Haaland scored his first international hat-trick in Norway's 4–0 victory over Romania in a Nations League B match, bringing his tally for the senior team to six goals in six matches played.

=== 2021–2024: Consecutive Nations League top scorer and all-time Norway top scorer ===
During the September 2021 international break, Haaland scored five goals in three World Cup qualification matches, including a second hat-trick for Norway in a 5–1 victory against Gibraltar. With six goals in League B between June and September 2022, he finished as the joint-top scorer of the 2022–23 UEFA Nations League.

Haaland's two goals in a Euro 2024 qualifier against Cyprus on 12 October 2023 brought his international tally to 27 goals in 27 appearances, surpassing Einar Gundersen as Norway's second-highest all-time top scorer. On 5 June 2024, Haaland scored a third hat-trick for his country in a 3–0 friendly win against Kosovo, bringing him within three goals of Norwegian top scorer Jørgen Juve.

On 10 October 2024, Haaland scored twice in a 3–0 Nations League win over Slovenia, reaching 34 international goals to become Norway's all-time top scorer at the age of just 24, and overtaking Juve's record that had stood since 1937. On 17 November, he recorded a fourth international hat-trick in a 5–0 win against Kazakhstan, helping Norway clinch promotion to League A of the Nations League for the first time.

=== 2025–2026: First World Cup ===
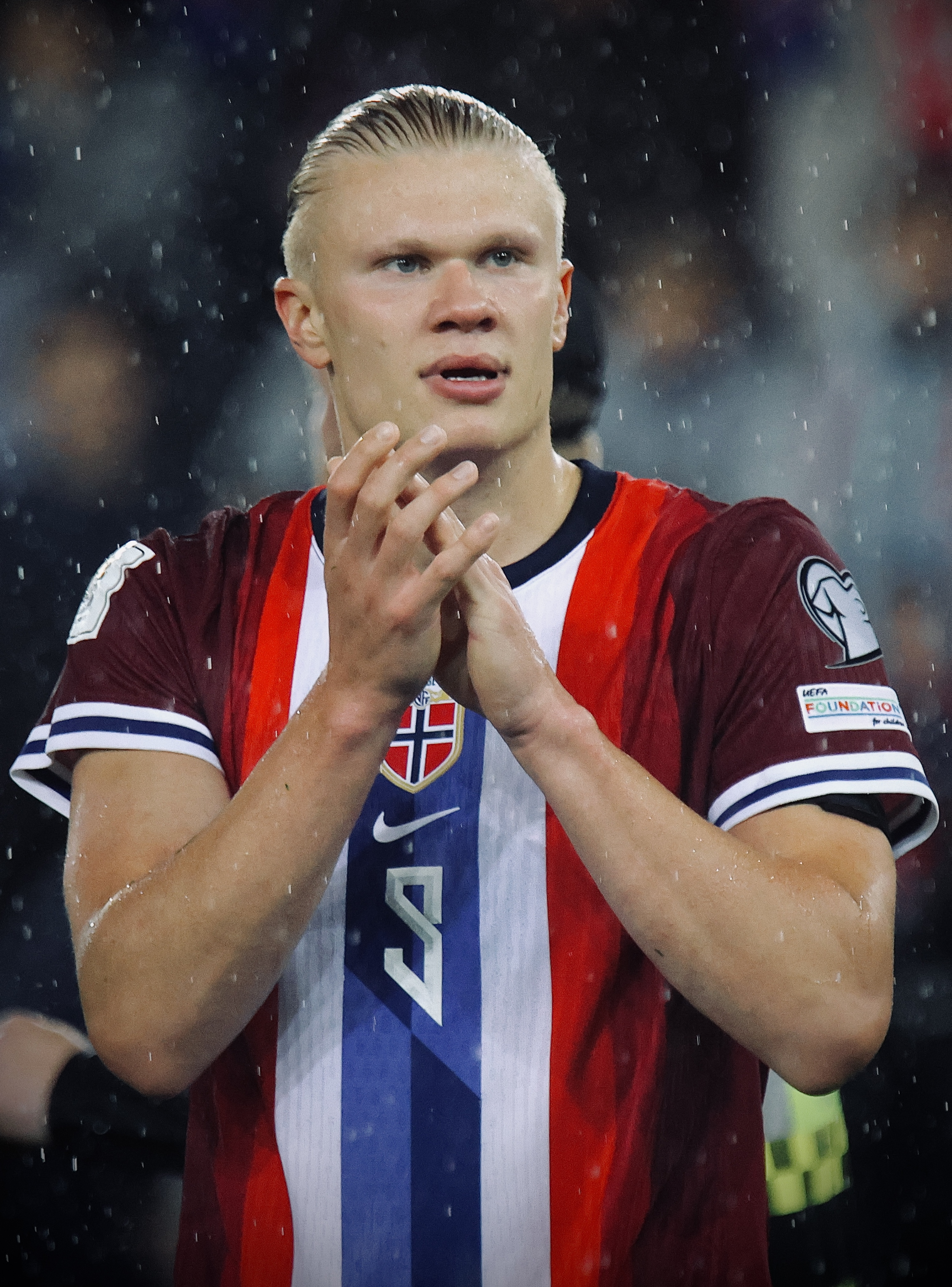
Haaland with Norway in 2025

On 6 June 2025, Haaland scored Norway's final goal in their 3–0 World Cup qualifying win against Italy, securing the nation's first victory over the Italians in 25 years. On 9 September, he scored five goals and assisted a further two in an 11–1 win over Moldova, becoming the first male European player to record five goals in a World Cup qualifier since Hans Krankl in 1977. A month later, on 11 October, he scored a hat-trick in a 5–0 win over Israel, becoming the fastest player in the 21st century to reach 50 international goals, breaking Harry Kane's record by achieving the milestone in just 46 matches compared to Kane's 71. He became the sixth player to reach 50 international goals in under 50 appearances. On 16 November, Haaland scored twice in a 4–1 away win over Italy, securing his nation's place at the 2026 FIFA World Cup with eight victories, marking their first World Cup appearance since 1998. Haaland finished the World Cup qualifying campaign with 16 goals, scoring in all eight of Norway's matches, and equalling Robert Lewandowski's record tally from the 2018 qualifiers for a single UEFA World Cup qualifying campaign. Haaland also became the second player to score in eight consecutive World Cup qualifying matches, behind Pauleta, who scored in nine consecutive qualifiers for Portugal. He equalled Abdul Ghani Minhat's record of scoring in 11 consecutive international appearances, achieved in 1962.

On 16 June 2026, Haaland made his FIFA World Cup debut against Iraq, scoring twice and being named Player of the Match in a 4–1 victory. He equalled the record for most goals scored by a Norwegian player at the tournament, jointly held by Kjetil Rekdal. In Norway's second group stage match on 23 June, Haaland again scored twice and was named Player of the Match in a 3–2 win over Senegal, becoming his country's all-time top scorer at the World Cup, and securing Norway's qualification to the knockout stage. These two goals also made him the sixth player in the history of the World Cup to score multiple goals in each of his first two tournament appearances.

Haaland playing against Morocco in a friendly before the 2026 FIFA World Cup

Haaland playing for Norway during the 2026–27 UEFA Nations League

In Norway's round of 32 match against the Ivory Coast on 30 June, Haaland scored the winning goal in a 2–1 victory, becoming the first Norwegian player to score in each of his first three World Cup matches. It was also Haaland's 60th international goal; coming after 53 appearances, he became the fastest player to reach this benchmark since Gerd Müller in 1973. On 5 July, he scored two goals and was named Player of the Match against Brazil, leading Norway to a 2–1 victory and their first ever World Cup quarter-final. With these goals, he extended his record of scoring in consecutive competitive international appearances to 14 and became the first European player since Christian Vieri in the 1998 World Cup to score in his first four appearances at the tournament. In the quarter-finals against England, Haaland fouled Elliot Anderson, failed to score, and was replaced by Jørgen Strand Larsen for the final 15 minutes of extra time, with Norway going on to lose 2–1. Norway head coach Ståle Solbakken later stated that Haaland came off due to exhaustion and a dead leg.

== Player profile ==
=== Style of play ===
A prolific goalscorer who has been regarded as one of the leading players of his generation, Haaland is often described as a complete centre forward. He uses his sizeable frame to hold play up effectively and involve others. He has the pace and clever movement to run in behind, he can dribble and create, and he can finish with both feet and his head. He usually comes deep to collect the ball to help his team build play, often looking to spread the ball wide for a teammate, before turning and sprinting towards goal. He sometimes comes too deep for the defenders to follow him; as such he has the awareness to turn on the ball and create from a forward-facing position. In the penalty area he makes small, sharp movements to spot an opportunity for a teammate to attempt to find him in space, and can change the line on which he is running and accelerate into that space, making him extremely difficult for defenders to read.

Haaland uses his body well when playing with his back to goal, protecting the ball effectively as he tries to bring it under control. He uses his strength to secure possession when under pressure and is also effective in providing his team's defenders with some respite following a clearance. His creativity is most apparent when he drifts into the left inside channel. His primary aim is always to get a shot off, but he also has the vision and skill to pick out a delayed run from midfield in the centre. His ability to carry the ball at pace also helps create for others, especially on the counter-attack. Even though he is less involved in possession than a typical striker, his calmness, patience, timing, and off-the-ball movement have a huge impact in build-up plays.

Haaland idolises Zlatan Ibrahimović and Cristiano Ronaldo, but also cites Michu, Jamie Vardy, Sergio Agüero and Robin van Persie as inspirations, and credits Virgil van Dijk and Sergio Ramos as two of the toughest defenders he has played against.

After scoring a goal, Haaland is known to perform a "meditation" celebration, in which he assumes the lotus position; the celebration has been featured in the FIFA series of video games.

=== Reception ===
After his record breaking first season in England, Gary Neville proclaimed that Haaland is "truly unique" and that he has the skill and strength of Wayne Rooney and the talent and finishing of Harry Kane and Ronaldo. In 2022, Jürgen Klopp labelled Haaland as the "best striker in the world" and stated that "physically he sets new standards, the combination of being really physical and technical and sensational awareness, his orientation on the pitch is exceptional, he knows always where the decisive gaps are, barely offside". His manager at City, Pep Guardiola, opined in 2023 that Haaland had the potential to get even better. In 2024, FIFPRO declared him to be "the deadliest striker in football today". For his achievements, he has also been hailed as the greatest Norwegian player of all time.

== Outside football ==
=== Social media ===
In 2023, Haaland gained recognition on social media after posting on Instagram that he had "raw-dogged" a seven-hour flight, sitting through it with no entertainment, food, water, or sleep. In 2025, Haaland launched his own YouTube channel that aimed to showcase his life off the pitch. Its first video included a look at him grilling steak and recovering in an ice bath, and subsequent videos includes fan experiences at Halloween and playing golf. By 2026, the total number of views to videos on Haaland's channel had surpassed 100 million.

He also has a Snapchat account, regularly posting vlogs during Norway's run in the 2026 World Cup, including one from Texas where he purchased a cowboy hat. Following the World Cup, Haaland was described as a "social media phenomenon", with his physical appearance and persona leading to hundreds of memes.

==== Music ====
In 2016, Haaland and his Norway under-17 teammates Erik Botheim and Erik Tobias Sandberg released a rap single entitled "Kygo Jo" under the group name Flow Kingz, with Haaland using the name "Lyng". The music video has over 28 million views on YouTube as of September 2026. Following his country's 2–1 win over Brazil in the 2026 World Cup round of 16, Norwegian DJ Kygo released a remix of the original 2016 track, which spent 2 weeks at the number 1 position on the Norwegian music chart, in addition to charting on the national music charts of 7 other countries.

==== Video Games ====
In May 2024, Haaland became a Barbarian King character in Clash of Clans mobile game. The game provides a month of football-themed content to honor Haaland's partnership with the game.

=== Miscellaneous ===
In December 2025, Haaland and his father purchased the 1594 edition of Snorri Sturluson's chronicles at an auction for 1.3 million Norwegian kroner, setting a national record for a book sale in Norway. He later donated the volume, which details the history of medieval Norse kings, to his home municipality Time for display in a library, saying he wanted local residents to be able to read about historical figures from their area.

In February 2026, Haaland was listed on The Sunday Times tax list with an estimated £16.9 million. Haaland is a practitioner of meditation. He also owns a large collection of luxury handbags, including bags by Hermès, Louis Vuitton, and Goyard.

Haaland is set to make his feature film voice acting debut, playing a Viking also named Haaland in the animated film ViQueens. The movie is scheduled for release around Christmas 2026. It is directed and co-written by Harald Zwart, who also directed The Karate Kid (2010). Zwart said "Erling has already become a kind of real-life Viking icon around the world".

In July 2026, Peru's National Registry of Identification and Civil Status (RENIEC) reported that 468 Peruvians had the surname Haaland and 91 children had been registered with his full name, Erling Haaland. The increase was linked to Norway's run at the 2026 FIFA World Cup, where Haaland emerged as one of the tournament's standout players. In a television broadcast, a spokesman of the registry noted the player's popularity in Peru, joking that "Haaland is Peruvian".

== Personal life ==
=== Family and name ===
Haaland is the son of the Norwegian former footballer Alf-Inge Haaland and former heptathlete Gry Marita Braut. On his mother's side, his first cousins Jonatan Braut Brunes, Emma Braut Brunes, and Albert Braut Tjåland are also professional footballers, as was his great-uncle Gabriel Høyland.

He changed the spelling of his surname from Håland to Haaland in 2019, stating that this was due to him moving outside of Norway and that he wanted an easier name for international fans. While his Manchester City shirts simply use the name Haaland, he has included his mother's surname for international appearances, so his name appears on his Norway jersey as "Braut Haaland". It is common in Norwegian culture for people to include both maternal and paternal names in their surname.

In December 2024, Haaland and his girlfriend Isabel Haugseng Johansen had their first child, a son.

Ahead of the 2026–27 Premier League season, Haaland debuted a change in appearance, shaving his signature long hair in favour of a close-cropped buzz cut.

== Career statistics ==
=== Club ===
As of match played 21 November 2026

Appearances and goals by club, season and competition
Club	Season	League			National cup (Note: Includes Norwegian Cup, Austrian Cup, DFB-Pokal, FA Cup)		League cup (Note: Includes EFL Cup)		Europe		Other		Total	
Club	Season	Division	Apps	Goals	Apps	Goals	Apps	Goals	Apps	Goals	Apps	Goals	Apps	Goals
Bryne 2	2015	3. divisjon	5	2	—		—		—		—		5	2
Bryne 2	2016	3. divisjon	13	16	—		—		—		—		13	16
Bryne 2	Total		18	18	—		—		—		—		18	18
Bryne	2016	1. divisjon	16	0	0	0	—		—		—		16	0
Molde 2	2017	3. divisjon	4	2	—		—		—		—		4	2
Molde	2017	Eliteserien	14	2	6	2	—		—		—		20	4
Molde	2018	Eliteserien	25	12	0	0	—		5 (Note: Appearance(s) in UEFA Europa League)	4	—		30	16
Molde	Total		39	14	6	2	—		5	4	—		50	20
Red Bull Salzburg	2018–19	Austrian Bundesliga	2	1	2	0	—		1	0	—		5	1
Red Bull Salzburg	2019–20	Austrian Bundesliga	14	16	2	4	—		6 (Note: Appearances in UEFA Champions League)	8	—		22	28
Red Bull Salzburg	Total		16	17	4	4	—		7	8	—		27	29
Borussia Dortmund	2019–20	Bundesliga	15	13	1	1	—		2	2	—		18	16
Borussia Dortmund	2020–21	Bundesliga	28	27	4	3	—		8	10	1 (Note: Appearance in DFL-Supercup)	1	41	41
Borussia Dortmund	2021–22	Bundesliga	24	22	2	4	—		3	3	1	0	30	29
Borussia Dortmund	Total		67	62	7	8	—		13	15	2	1	89	86
Manchester City	2022–23	Premier League	35	36	4	3	2	1	11	12	1 (Note: Appearance in FA Community Shield)	0	53	52
Manchester City	2023–24	Premier League	31	27	3	5	0	0	9	6	2 (Note: One appearance in FA Community Shield, one appearance in UEFA Super Cup)	0	45	38
Manchester City	2024–25	Premier League	31	22	3	1	0	0	9	8	5 (Note: One appearance in FA Community Shield, four appearances and three goals in FIFA Club World Cup)	3	48	34
Manchester City	2025–26	Premier League	35	27	4	3	3	0	10	8	—		52	38
Manchester City	2026–27	Premier League	11	9	0	0	0	0	3	5	1	0	15	14
Manchester City	Total		143	121	14	12	5	1	42	39	9	3	213	176
Career total			303	234	31	26	5	1	67	66	11	4	417	331

=== International ===
As of match played 17 November 2026

Appearances and goals by national team and year
National team	Year	Apps	Goals
Norway	2019	2	0
Norway	2020	5	6
Norway	2021	8	6
Norway	2022	8	9
Norway	2023	6	6
Norway	2024	10	11
Norway	2025	9	17
Norway	2026	13	13
Total		61	68

== Honours ==
Red Bull Salzburg

- Austrian Bundesliga: 2018–19
- Austrian Cup: 2018–19

Borussia Dortmund

- DFB-Pokal: 2020–21

Manchester City

- Premier League: 2022–23, 2023–24
- FA Cup: 2022–23, 2025–26
- EFL Cup: 2025–26
- FA Community Shield: 2024
- UEFA Champions League: 2022–23
- UEFA Super Cup: 2023

Individual

- Ballon d'Or runner-up: 2023
- European Golden Shoe: 2022–23
- UEFA Men's Player of the Year: 2022–23
- UEFA Champions League top scorer: 2020–21, 2022–23
- Bundesliga Player of the Season: 2020–21
- Premier League Player of the Season: 2022–23
- Premier League Golden Boot: 2022–23 2023–24 2025–26
- Premier League Fan Team of the Season: 2023–24, 2025–26
- FIFA Men's World 11: 2024
- FIFA World Cup Dream XI: 2026
- Eliteserien Breakthrough of the Year: 2018
- ESPN Striker of the Year: 2022–23
- Austrian Footballer of the Year: 2019
- Austrian Breakthrough of the year: 2019–20
- Austrian Bundesliga Player of the Season: 2019–20
- FIFA U-20 World Cup Golden Boot: 2019
- UEFA Champions League Breakthrough XI: 2019
- Bundesliga Player of the Month: January 2020, November 2020, April 2021, August 2021
- Bundesliga Rookie of the Month: January 2020, February 2020
- Bundesliga Goal of the Month: September 2021
- Bundesliga Team of the Season: 2020–21, 2021–22
- VDV Bundesliga Team of the Season: 2019–20, 2020–21, 2021–22
- kicker Bundesliga Team of the Season: 2021–22
- FWA Footballer of the Year: 2022–23
- Premier League Young Player of the Season: 2022–23
- Premier League Player of the Month: August 2022, April 2023, August 2024, September 2025
- PFA Premier League Fans' Player of the Month: August 2022, September 2022, December 2022
- ESM Team of the Year: 2019–20 2022–23
- IFFHS Men's World Youth (U20) Team: 2020
- Golden Boy: 2020
- Golden Player Man Award: 2023
- Gullballen: 2020, 2021, 2022, 2023, 20242025
- Kniksen's honour award: 2020
- Norwegian Sportsperson of the Year: 2020, 2025
- UEFA Champions League Squad/Team of the Season: 2020–21, 2022–23
- UEFA Champions League Forward of the Season: 2020–21
- UEFA Nations League top scorer: 2020–21, 2022–23
- FIFPRO Men's World 11: 2021, 2022, 2023, 2024, 2026
- IFFHS Men's World Team: 2022, 2023, 2024, 2025
- IFFHS Men's UEFA Team: 2024
- Manchester City Player of the Season: 2022–23
- PFA Team of the Year: 2022–23 Premier League, 2023–24 Premier League 2025–26 Premier League
- PFA Players' Player of the Year: 2022–23
- Gerd Müller Trophy: 2023
- Globe Soccer Best Player of the Year: 2023
- The Guardian Best Footballer in the World: 2023
- World Soccer Player of the Year: 2023
- FourFourTwo Player of the Year: 2022, 2023
- BBC Sports Personality World Sport Star of the Year: 2023
- IFFHS World's Best Player: 2023
- IFFHS World's Best International Goal Scorer: 2025
- Onze d'Or: 2022–23
- Idrettsgallaen Name of the year: 2023

== Discography ==
Title	Year
"Kygo Jo" (as Lyng) (with Flow Kingz)	2016

== See also ==
- List of top international men's football goalscorers by country
- List of men's footballers with 50 or more international goals
- List of FIFA World Cup top goalscorers
