= 2017 Sogndal Fotball season =

Sogndal
2017 season
- President: Tor Arne Ness
- Manager: Eirik Bakke
- Stadium: Fosshaugane Campus
- Eliteserien: 14th
- Norwegian Cup: Third Round vs Florø
Home colours	Away colours

The 2017 season is Sogndal's second season back in the Eliteserien since their relegation at the end of the 2014 season.

== Squad ==
As of 16 September 2017

Note: Flags indicate national team as defined under FIFA eligibility rules; some limited exceptions apply. Players may hold more than one non-FIFA nationality.

No.	Pos.	Nation	Player
1	GK	NOR	Mathias Dyngeland
2	DF	EST	Taijo Teniste
3	DF	NOR	Bjørn Inge Utvik
4	MF	NGR	Chidiebere Nwakali (on loan from Manchester City)
5	DF	NOR	Victor Grodås
7	MF	NOR	Eirik Schulze
10	MF	GHA	Gilbert Koomson
11	FW	NOR	Martin Ramsland
13	GK	NOR	Tarjei Aase Omenås
14	DF	ENG	Reiss Greenidge
15	DF	NOR	Per Magnus Steiring
16	DF	NOR	Ole Martin Rindarøy (on loan from Molde)
17	DF	FRA	Christophe Psyché
18	FW	NOR	Bendik Bye

No.	Pos.	Nation	Player
19	FW	NOR	Ole Amund Sveen
20	FW	NOR	Markus Brændsrød
21	GK	NOR	Kristian Rutlin
22	MF	NOR	Lars Christian Kjemhus
23	MF	NOR	Edin Øy
24	DF	NOR	Eirik Bergum Skaasheim
25	FW	DEN	Kasper Nissen
26	DF	DEN	Magnus Pedersen
27	MF	NOR	Eirik Birkelund
28	MF	NOR	Johan Hove
30	MF	NOR	Joachim Soltvedt
39	MF	GUI	Mohamed Didé Fofana
40	DF	NOR	Even Hovland
77	FW	MNE	Staniša Mandić (loan from Čukarički)

=== Out on loan ===
Note: Flags indicate national team as defined under FIFA eligibility rules; some limited exceptions apply. Players may hold more than one non-FIFA nationality.

No.	Pos.	Nation	Player
—	MF	NOR	Peter Aase (at Åsane)
—	MF	NOR	Henrik Furebotn (at Fredrikstad)
—	MF	NOR	Fredrik Flo (at Bryne)
—	MF	NOR	Simen Brekkhus (at Åsane)

== Transfers ==
=== Winter ===
In: Note: Flags indicate national team as defined under FIFA eligibility rules; some limited exceptions apply. Players may hold more than one non-FIFA nationality.

No.	Pos.	Nation	Player
4	MF	NGR	Chidiebere Nwakali (on loan from (England) Manchester City)
5	DF	NOR	Victor Grodås (loan return from (Norway) Kristiansund)
7	MF	NOR	Eirik Schulze (from (Norway) Sandnes Ulf)
13	GK	NOR	Tarjei Aase Omenås (from (Norway) Strømmen)
15	DF	NOR	Per Magnus Steiring (from (Norway) Rosenborg, previously on loan at Viking)
18	FW	NOR	Bendik Bye (from (Norway) Levanger)
25	FW	DEN	Kasper Nissen (from (Norway) Nest-Sotra)
30	DF	ISL	Kristinn Jónsson (from (Norway) Sarpsborg 08)
34	MF	NOR	Simen Brekkhus (loan return from (Norway) Florø)

Out: Note: Flags indicate national team as defined under FIFA eligibility rules; some limited exceptions apply. Players may hold more than one non-FIFA nationality.

No.	Pos.	Nation	Player
4	DF	FIN	Hannu Patronen (to (Finland) HJK Helsinki)
7	MF	NOR	Rune Bolseth (retired)
15	DF	FIN	Jukka Raitala (to (United States) Columbus Crew)
16	DF	NOR	Vegard Leikvoll Moberg (to (Norway) Bodø/Glimt)
18	FW	GHA	Mahatma Otoo (to (Turkey) Ümraniyespor)
20	FW	NOR	Kristian Fardal Opseth (on loan to (Norway) Bodø/Glimt)
25	MF	NOR	Ruben Holsæter (to (Norway) Førde)
26	DF	DEN	Magnus Pedersen (on loan to (Norway) Elverum)
29	GK	NOR	Stefan Hagerup (to (Norway) Ull/Kisa)

=== Summer ===
In: Note: Flags indicate national team as defined under FIFA eligibility rules; some limited exceptions apply. Players may hold more than one non-FIFA nationality.

No.	Pos.	Nation	Player
14	DF	NOR	Ole Martin Rindarøy (loan from (Norway) Molde)
16	DF	ENG	Reiss Greenidge (from (England) Ebbsfleet United)
20	FW	NOR	Markus Brændsrød (from (Norway) Strømmen)
23	MF	NOR	Edin Øy (loan return from (Norway) Fana)
26	DF	DEN	Magnus Pedersen (loan return from (Norway) Elverum)
30	MF	NOR	Joachim Soltvedt (from (Norway) Åsane)
39	MF	GUI	Mohamed Didé Fofana (from (Guinea) Hafia)
40	DF	NOR	Even Hovland (from (Germany) Nürnberg)
77	FW	MNE	Staniša Mandić (on loan from (Serbia) Čukarički)

Out: Note: Flags indicate national team as defined under FIFA eligibility rules; some limited exceptions apply. Players may hold more than one non-FIFA nationality.

No.	Pos.	Nation	Player
6	MF	NOR	Henrik Furebotn (on loan to (Norway) Fredrikstad)
8	FW	NOR	Fredrik Flo (on loan to (Norway) Bryne)
14	MF	NOR	Kristoffer Ryland
16	DF	ETH	Walid Atta (loan return to (Saudi Arabia) Najran)
20	FW	NOR	Kristian Fardal Opseth (to (Norway) Bodø/Glimt, previously on loan)
30	DF	ISL	Kristinn Jónsson (to (Iceland) Breiðablik)
34	MF	NOR	Simen Brekkhus (on loan to (Norway) Åsane)

== Competitions ==
=== Eliteserien ===
==== Results summary ====
Overall								Home						Away					
Pld	W	D	L	GF	GA	GD	Pts	W	D	L	GF	GA	GD	W	D	L	GF	GA	GD
30	8	8	14	38	48	−10	32	6	4	5	27	21	+6	2	4	9	11	27	−16

Last updated: 26 November 2017.
Source: see below

==== Results by round ====
Round	1	2	3	4	5	6	7	8	9	10	11	12	13	14	15	16	17	18	19	20	21	22	23	24	25	26	27	28	29	30
Ground	A	H	A	H	A	H	A	H	A	H	A	H	H	A	H	A	H	A	A	H	A	H	A	H	A	H	A	H	A	H
Result	L	W	L	D	L	L	D	W	W	L	D	W	D	L	W	D	L	L	L	W	L	L	W	D	L	D	L	L	D	W
Position	15	6	10	12	13	16	15	13	11	11	12	9	12	12	11	11	12	13	13	13	13	14	13	13	13	13	14	15	15	14

Updated to match(es) played on 26 November 2017. Source: see below
A = Away; H = Home; W = Win; D = Draw; L = Loss

==== Results ====
2 April 2017 1	Sarpsborg 08	3–1	Sogndal	Sarpsborg
15:30 CEST (UTC+2)	Rosted 30', 65'; Jørgensen (yellow card) 50'; Zachariassen 55'	Report	Ramsland 14'	Stadium: Sarpsborg Stadion; Attendance: 4,302; Referee: Espen Eskås

5 April 2017 2	Sogndal	4–1	Stabæk	Sogndalsfjøra
19:00 CEST (UTC+2)	Mandé 19' (o.g.); Birkelund (yellow card) 39'; Bye 46', 55'; Koomson 74' (pen.)	Report	Hanche-Olsen (yellow card) 49'; Nimely 70'; Njie (yellow card) 90'	Stadium: Fosshaugane Campus; Attendance: 2,237; Referee: Rohit Saggi

9 April 2017 3	Tromsø	3–0	Sogndal	Tromsø
18:00 CEST (UTC+2)	Åsen 46'; Wangberg 53'; Norbye 90+3'	Report	Grodås (yellow card) 32'	Stadium: Alfheim Stadion; Attendance: 3,082; Referee: Trygve Kjensli

17 April 2017 4	Sogndal	1–1	Strømsgodset	Sogndalsfjøra
18:00 CEST (UTC+2)	Ramsland 31'; Utvik (yellow card) 35'	Report	Jradi 14'; Pedersen (yellow card) 47'; Tagbajumi (yellow card) 64'	Stadium: Fosshaugane Campus; Attendance: 2,454; Referee: Kristoffer Hagenes

23 April 2017 5	Vålerenga	3–0	Sogndal	Oslo
18:00 CEST (UTC+2)	Grindheim 41' (yellow card) 68'; Tollås 44'; Finne 89'	Report	Birkelund (yellow card) 38'; Skaasheim (yellow card) 49'; Nwakali (yellow card) 55'	Stadium: Ullevaal Stadion; Attendance: 5,844; Referee: Svein Oddvar Moen

30 April 2017 6	Sogndal	0–1	Lillestrøm	Sogndalsfjøra
18:00 CEST (UTC+2)		Report	Mikalsen 63'	Stadium: Fosshaugane Campus; Attendance: 3,024; Referee: Tore Hansen

7 May 2017 7	Haugesund	0–0	Sogndal	Haugesund
18:00 CEST (UTC+2)		Report	Fredriksen (red card) 75'	Stadium: Haugesund Stadion; Referee: Martin Lundby

13 May 2017 8	Sogndal	4–0	Viking	Sogndalsfjøra
18:00 CEST (UTC+2)	Koomson 1', 38', 69'; Ramsland (yellow card) 33' (goal) 87'; Grodås (yellow card) 56'	Report	Austbø (yellow card) 68'	Stadium: Fosshaugane Campus; Attendance: 2,512; Referee: Kai Erik Steen

16 May 2017 9	Molde	1–2	Sogndal	Molde
18:00 CEST (UTC+2)	Sigurðarson 58'	Report	Ramsland 48'; Schulze 57'; Wæhler (yellow card) 62'	Stadium: Aker Stadion; Attendance: 7,106; Referee: Trygve Kjensli

20 May 2017 10	Sogndal	2–3	Brann	Sogndalsfjøra
18:00 CEST (UTC+2)	Schulze 10' (yellow card) 80'; Steiring 61'; Ramsland (yellow card) 77'	Report	Barmen 63'; Larsen 82'; Haugen 84'; Leciejewski (yellow card) 88'	Stadium: Fosshaugane Campus; Attendance: 5,600; Referee: Espen Eskås

28 May 2017 11	Kristiansund	1–1	Sogndal	Kristiansund
18:00 CEST (UTC+2)	Mendy 36'	Report	Wæhler (yellow card) 19'; Schulze 58'	Stadium: Atlanten Stadion; Attendance: 3,509; Referee: Dag Vidar Hafsås

4 June 2017 12	Sogndal	3–2	Sandefjord	Sogndalsfjøra
18:00 CEST (UTC+2)	Moberg 16'; Jónsson (yellow card) 26'; Birkelund (yellow card) 42'; Koomson 45+3'; Bye 90+6'	Report	Wæhler 15' (o.g.); Vallès (yellow card) 31'; Sødlund 39'; Hansen (red card) 45+2'	Stadium: Fosshaugane Campus; Attendance: 2,463; Referee: Trygve Kjensli

18 June 2017 13	Sogndal	0–0	Odd	Sogndalsfjøra
18:00 CEST (UTC+2)	Schulze (yellow card) 18'; Ramsland (yellow card) 40'; Hove (yellow card) 68'	Report	Semb Berge (yellow card) 73'	Stadium: Fosshaugane Campus; Attendance: 2,459; Referee: Kristoffer Hagenes

25 June 2017 14	Rosenborg	3–0	Sogndal	Trondheim
18:00 CEST (UTC+2)	Vilhjálmsson 61'; Jevtović 65', 67' (yellow card) 66'	Report	Kjemhus (yellow card) 26'; Hove (yellow card) 58'	Stadium: Lerkendal Stadion; Attendance: 17,545; Referee: Tore Hansen

1 July 2017 15	Sogndal	1–0	Aalesund	Sogndalsfjøra
20:15 CEST (UTC+2)	Nwakali 2' (red card) 83'; Koomson (yellow card) 55'	Report	Arnarson (yellow card) 77'	Stadium: Fosshaugane Campus; Attendance: 5,089; Referee: Trond Ivar Døvle

9 July 2017 16	Viking	1–1	Sogndal	Stavanger
18:00 CEST (UTC+2)	Mets (yellow card) 53'; Martinsen 66'; Danielsen (yellow card) 90+3'	Report	Steiring (yellow card) 40'; Ramsland 67'; Fredriksen (yellow card) 69'	Stadium: Viking Stadion; Attendance: 7,238; Referee: Dag Vidar Hafsås

15 July 2017 17	Sogndal	0–3	Rosenborg	Sogndalsfjøra
15:30 CEST (UTC+2)	Steiring (yellow card) 63'; Dyngeland (yellow card) 77'	Report	Jevtović 31'; Midtsjø 56'; Reginiussen (yellow card) 69'; Vilhjálmsson (yellow card) 75' (goal) 78'	Stadium: Fosshaugane Campus; Attendance: 4,507; Referee: Rohit Saggi

6 August 2017 18	Odd	2–1	Sogndal	Skien
18:00 CEST (UTC+2)	Broberg 3'; Samuelsen 26' (pen.)	Report	Schulze 79'	Stadium: Skagerak Arena; Attendance: 6,433; Referee: Tore Hansen

11 August 2017 19	Sandefjord	2–1	Sogndal	Sandefjord
19:00 CEST (UTC+2)	Vallès (yellow card) 13'; Storbæk 45'; Kastrati (yellow card) 64'; Mjelde 89'	Report	Wæhler (yellow card) 12'; Nwakali (yellow card) 13'; Greenidge 48'; Steiring (yellow card) 79'	Stadium: Komplett Arena; Referee: Martin Lundby

20 August 2017 20	Sogndal	2–0	Kristiansund	Sogndalsfjøra
18:00 CEST (UTC+2)	Koomson 15' (pen.); Nwakali 76'	Report	Bjerkås (yellow card) 15'; Sørli (yellow card) 72'	Stadium: Fosshaugane Campus; Attendance: 2,987; Referee: Trygve Kjensli

9 September 2017 21	Brann	2–1	Sogndal	Bergen
18:00 CEST (UTC+2)	Vega 9'; Barmen 50'	Report	Schulze 24'; Ramsland (yellow card) 72'; Grodås (yellow card) 83'	Stadium: Brann Stadion; Attendance: 15,374; Referee: Ola Hobber Nilsen

17 September 2017 22	Sogndal	0–1	Haugesund	Sogndalsfjøra
18:00 CEST (UTC+2)	Birkelund (yellow card) 22'; Greenidge (yellow card) 76'	Report	Gytkjær 68'; Abdi (yellow card) 77'; Knudsen (yellow card) 82'	Stadium: Fosshaugane Campus; Attendance: 2,589; Referee: Tom Harald Hagen

24 September 2017 23	Aalesund	0–1	Sogndal	Ålesund
18:00 CEST (UTC+2)	Hatlehol (yellow card) 86'	Report	Schulze 34' (yellow card) 57'; Ramsland (yellow card) 65'	Stadium: Color Line Stadion; Attendance: 5,178; Referee: Martin Lundby

1 October 2017 24	Sogndal	2–2	Molde	Sogndalsfjøra
18:00 CEST (UTC+2)	Mandić 12'; Nwakali 23'; Hovland (yellow card) 50'	Report	Sigurðarson 36'; Strand 45+3'	Stadium: Fosshaugane Campus; Attendance: 3,012; Referee: Dag Vidar Hafsås

15 October 2017 25	Lillestrøm	1–0	Sogndal	Lillestrøm
18:00 CEST (UTC+2)	Kippe (yellow card) 30' (goal) 89'; Amundsen (yellow card) 67'	Report	Hove (yellow card) 15'	Stadium: Åråsen Stadion; Attendance: 4,312; Referee: Svein Oddvar Moen

22 October 2017 27	Sogndal	3–3	Sarpsborg 08	Sogndalsfjøra
18:00 CEST (UTC+2)	Wæhler 21'; Greenidge (yellow card) 24'; Koomson 26'; Rindarøy 39'; Birkelund (yellow card) 67'; Hovland (yellow card) 78'; Ramsland (yellow card) 84'	Report	Diatta 4' (yellow card) 41'; Nielsen 54', 88'	Stadium: Fosshaugane Campus; Attendance: 2,504; Referee: Trygve Kjensli

29 October 2017 28	Strømsgodset	4–1	Sogndal	Drammen
18:00 CET (UTC+1)	Glesnes (yellow card) 39'; Júnior 44'; Jradi 61', 86'; Pedersen 64'	Report	Bye 14' (yellow card) 90'; Wæhler (yellow card) 39'	Stadium: Marienlyst Stadion; Attendance: 6,048; Referee: Ola Hobber Nilsen

5 November 2017 28	Sogndal	0–2	Tromsø	Sogndalsfjøra
18:00 CET (UTC+1)		Report	Olsen 38'; Ingebrigtsen 66'; Samb (yellow card) 89'	Stadium: Fosshaugane Campus; Attendance: 3,675; Referee: Tore Hansen

19 November 2017 29	Stabæk	1–1	Sogndal	Bærum
18:00 CEST (UTC+2)	Brynhildsen 30'	Report	Birkelund (yellow card) 25'; Dyngeland (yellow card) 35'; Soltvedt 56'; Mandić (yellow card) 83'	Stadium: Nadderud Stadion; Attendance: 4,373; Referee: Tom Harald Hagen

26 November 2017 30	Sogndal	5–2	Vålerenga	Sogndalsfjøra
18:00 CEST (UTC+2)	Rindarøy 5'; Birkelund 41'; Teniste (yellow card) 60' (goal) 70'; Ramsland 72'; Nwakali 75'	Report	Johansen 24'; Näsberg (yellow card) 27'; Grindheim 68'	Stadium: Fosshaugane Campus; Attendance: 3,585; Referee: Rohit Saggi

==== Table ====
Pos	Team	Pld	W	D	L	GF	GA	GD	Pts	Qualification or relegation
12	Lillestrøm	30	10	7	13	40	43	−3	37	Qualification for the Europa League second qualifying round (Note: Lillestrøm qualified for the Europa League second qualifying round as winners of the 2017 Norwegian Cup.)
13	Sandefjord	30	11	3	16	38	51	−13	36	
14	Sogndal (R)	30	8	8	14	38	48	−10	32	Qualification for the relegation play-offs
15	Aalesund (R)	30	8	8	14	38	50	−12	32	Relegation to First Division
16	Viking (R)	30	6	6	18	33	57	−24	24	Relegation to First Division

Source: Football Association of Norway (in Norwegian), Soccerway
Rules for classification: 1) Points; 2) Goal difference; 3) Goals scored; 4) Head-to-head points; 5) Head-to-head goal difference; 6) Head-to-head away goals scored (only if between two teams); 7) Head-to-head goals scored; 8) Play-off (only used to decide champions or relegation).
(R) Relegated

==== Relegation play-offs ====
29 November 2017 First leg	Sogndal	1–0	Ranheim	Sogndalsfjøra
18:00 CET (UTC+1)	Ramsland (yellow card) 49'; Rindarøy 52'; Teniste (yellow card) 56'; Nwakali (yellow card) 75'	Report	Karlsen (yellow card) 86'	Stadium: Fosshaugane Campus; Attendance: 4,531; Referee: Tom Harald Hagen

2 December 2017 Second leg	Ranheim	1–0 (a.e.t.) (1–1 agg.) (5–4 p)	Sogndal	Trondheim
18:00 CET (UTC+1)	Rismark (yellow card) 38'; Løkberg (yellow card) 40'; Karlsen 88' (pen.); Witry (yellow card) 92'	Report		Stadium: EXTRA Arena; Attendance: 4,531; Referee: Tore Hansen
	Penalties
	Reginiussen (penalty scored); Kvande (penalty scored); Barli (penalty scored); Witry (penalty scored); Karlsen (penalty scored)		(penalty scored) Teniste; (penalty scored) Soltvedt; (penalty scored) Mandić; (penalty missed) Schulze; (penalty scored) Hovland

=== Norwegian Cup ===
26 April 2017 First Round	Fjøra	1–6	Sogndal	Sogndalsfjøra
18:00 CEST (UTC+2)	Sørflaten (yellow card) 57'; Flo 61'	Report	Nwakali 7' (yellow card) 89'; Koomson 27'; Bye 43'; Brekkhus 69'; Kjemhus 71', 85'	Stadium: Fosshaugane Campus; Attendance: 340; Referee: Marius Hansen Grøtta

24 May 2017 Second Round	Raufoss	0–2	Sogndal	Raufoss
18:00 CEST (UTC+2)	S.Hjelmtvedt (yellow card) 15'; M.Alm (yellow card) 90+2'	Report	Lund 79'; Bye 81'	Stadium: NAMMO Stadion; Attendance: 792; Referee: Bjørn Hansen

31 May 2017 Third Round	Florø	2–1	Sogndal	Florø
18:00 CEST (UTC+2)	Muhammed 61'; Benmoussa 67'; Frenderup (yellow card) 90+2'	Report	Husa 60' (o.g.); Fredriksen (yellow card) 63'	Stadium: Florø Stadion; Attendance: 1,209; Referee: Jan Morten Tennøy

== Squad statistics ==
As of match played 2 December 2017

=== Appearances and goals ===
No.	Pos	Nat	Player	Total		Eliteserien		Relegation Playoff		Norwegian Cup	
No.	Pos	Nat	Player	Apps	Goals	Apps	Goals	Apps	Goals	Apps	Goals
1	GK	(Norway) NOR	Mathias Dyngeland	33	0	30	0	2	0	1	0
2	DF	(Estonia) EST	Taijo Teniste	30	1	26	1	2	0	1+1	0
3	DF	(Norway) NOR	Bjørn Inge Utvik	16	0	10+4	0	0+1	0	1	0
4	MF	(Nigeria) NGR	Chidiebere Nwakali	29	5	24+2	4	1	0	2	1
5	DF	(Norway) NOR	Victor Grodås	14	0	10+3	0	0	0	1	0
7	MF	(Norway) NOR	Eirik Schulze	28	6	21+4	6	1+1	0	1	0
10	MF	(Ghana) GHA	Gilbert Koomson	33	8	28	7	2	0	3	1
11	FW	(Norway) NOR	Martin Ramsland	30	6	26+1	6	2	0	1	0
13	GK	(Norway) NOR	Tarjei Aase Omenås	2	0	0	0	0	0	2	0
14	DF	(Norway) NOR	Ole Martin Rindarøy	7	4	6	2	1	2	0	0
15	DF	(Norway) NOR	Per Magnus Steiring	24	1	17+3	1	2	0	2	0
16	DF	(England) ENG	Reiss Greenidge	13	1	10+1	1	0+2	0	0	0
17	DF	(France) FRA	Christophe Psyché	6	0	6	0	0	0	0	0
18	FW	(Norway) NOR	Bendik Bye	28	6	11+13	4	1	0	3	2
19	MF	(Norway) NOR	Ole Amund Sveen	2	0	1+1	0	0	0	0	0
20	FW	(Norway) NOR	Markus Brændsrød	5	0	0+5	0	0	0	0	0
22	MF	(Norway) NOR	Lars Christian Kjemhus	15	2	10+3	0	0	0	2	2
24	DF	(Norway) NOR	Eirik Bergum Skaasheim	15	0	6+7	0	0	0	2	0
27	MF	(Norway) NOR	Eirik Birkelund	32	1	28	1	1	0	3	0
28	MF	(Norway) NOR	Johan Hove	14	0	5+6	0	1	0	1+1	0
30	MF	(Norway) NOR	Joachim Soltvedt	6	1	1+4	1	0+1	0	0	0
31	DF	(Norway) NOR	Ulrik Fredriksen	19	0	14+2	0	0	0	2+1	0
35	DF	(Norway) NOR	Eivind Helgesen	1	0	0+1	0	0	0	0	0
37	DF	(Norway) NOR	Espen Næss Lund	11	1	2+7	0	0	0	2	1
39	MF	(Guinea) GUI	Mohamed Didé Fofana	1	0	1	0	0	0	0	0
40	DF	(Norway) NOR	Even Hovland	11	0	9	0	2	0	0	0
41	DF	(Norway) NOR	Kjetil Wæhler	19	1	16+1	1	2	0	0	0
77	FW	(Montenegro) MNE	Staniša Mandić	10	1	4+4	1	1+1	0	0	0
Players away from Sogndal on loan:
6	MF	(Norway) NOR	Henrik Furebotn	13	0	6+6	0	0	0	1	0
8	FW	(Norway) NOR	Fredrik Flo	3	0	0+2	0	0	0	1	0
34	MF	(Norway) NOR	Simen Brekkhus	7	1	1+4	0	0	0	1+1	1
Players who left Sogndal during the season:
16	MF	(Ethiopia) ETH	Walid Atta	1	0	0	0	0	0	0+1	0
30	DF	(Iceland) ISL	Kristinn Jónsson	3	0	1	0	0	0	0+2	0

=== Goal scorers ===
Place	Position	Nation	Number	Name	Tippeligaen	Relegation Playoffs	Norwegian Cup	Total
1	MF	(Ghana)	10	Gilbert Koomson	7	0	1	8
2	FW	(Norway)	11	Martin Ramsland	7	0	0	7
3	MF	(Norway)	7	Eirik Schulze	6	0	0	6
3	FW	(Norway)	18	Bendik Bye	4	0	2	6
5	MF	(Nigeria)	4	Chidiebere Nwakali	4	0	1	5
6	DF	(Norway)	14	Ole Martin Rindarøy	2	1	0	3
7	MF	(Norway)	22	Lars Christian Kjemhus	0	0	2	2
7				Own goal	1	0	1	2
9	DF	(Norway)	15	Per Magnus Steiring	1	0	0	1
9	DF	(England)	16	Reiss Greenidge	1	0	0	1
9	FW	(Montenegro)	77	Staniša Mandić	1	0	0	1
9	DF	(Norway)	41	Kjetil Wæhler	1	0	0	1
9	MF	(Norway)	30	Joachim Soltvedt	1	0	0	1
9	DF	(Estonia)	2	Taijo Teniste	1	0	0	1
9	MF	(Norway)	30	Eirik Birkelund	1	0	0	1
9	MF	(Norway)	34	Simen Brekkhus	0	0	1	1
9	DF	(Norway)	37	Espen Næss Lund	0	0	1	1
				TOTALS	38	1	10	49

=== Disciplinary record ===
Number	Nation	Position	Name	Tippeligaen		Relegation Playoffs		Norwegian Cup		Total	
Number	Nation	Position	Name	Yellow card	Red card	Yellow card	Red card	Yellow card	Red card	Yellow card	Red card
1	(Norway)	GK	Mathias Dyngeland	2	0	0	0	0	0	2	0
2	(Estonia)	DF	Taijo Teniste	1	0	1	0	0	0	2	0
3	(Norway)	DF	Bjørn Inge Utvik	1	0	0	0	0	0	1	0
4	(Nigeria)	MF	Chidiebere Nwakali	2	1	1	0	1	0	4	1
5	(Norway)	DF	Victor Grodås	3	0	0	0	0	0	3	0
7	(Norway)	MF	Eirik Schulze	3	0	0	0	0	0	3	0
10	(Ghana)	MF	Gilbert Koomson	1	0	0	0	0	0	1	0
11	(Norway)	FW	Martin Ramsland	6	0	1	0	0	0	7	0
15	(Norway)	DF	Per Magnus Steiring	3	0	0	0	0	0	3	0
16	(England)	DF	Reiss Greenidge	2	0	0	0	0	0	2	0
18	(Norway)	FW	Bendik Bye	1	0	0	0	0	0	1	0
22	(Norway)	MF	Lars Christian Kjemhus	1	0	0	0	0	0	1	0
24	(Norway)	DF	Eirik Bergum Skaasheim	1	0	0	0	0	0	1	0
27	(Norway)	MF	Eirik Birkelund	6	0	0	0	0	0	6	0
28	(Norway)	MF	Johan Hove	3	0	0	0	0	0	3	0
30	(Iceland)	DF	Kristinn Jónsson	1	0	0	0	0	0	1	0
31	(Norway)	DF	Ulrik Fredriksen	1	1	0	0	1	0	2	1
40	(Norway)	DF	Even Hovland	2	0	0	0	0	0	2	0
41	(Norway)	DF	Kjetil Wæhler	4	0	0	0	0	0	4	0
77	(Montenegro)	FW	Staniša Mandić	1	0	0	0	0	0	1	0
			TOTALS	44	2	3	0	2	0	49	2
