= 2016 Sogndal Fotball season =

Sogndal
2016 season
- President: Tor Arne Ness
- Manager: Eirik Bakke
- Stadium: Fosshaugane Campus
- Tippeligaen: 11th
- Norwegian Cup: Third Round vs Nest-Sotra
Home colours	Away colours

The 2016 season is Sogndal's first season back in the Tippeligaen since their relegation at the end of the 2014 season.

== Squad ==
As of 19 April 2016

Note: Flags indicate national team as defined under FIFA eligibility rules; some limited exceptions apply. Players may hold more than one non-FIFA nationality.

No.	Pos.	Nation	Player
1	GK	NOR	Mathias Dyngeland
2	DF	EST	Taijo Teniste
3	DF	NOR	Bjørn Inge Utvik
4	DF	FIN	Hannu Patronen
6	MF	NOR	Henrik Furebotn
7	MF	NOR	Rune Bolseth
10	MF	GHA	Gilbert Koomson
11	FW	NOR	Martin Ramsland
15	DF	FIN	Jukka Raitala
16	DF	NOR	Vegard Leikvoll Moberg
17	DF	FRA	Christophe Psyché
18	FW	GHA	Mahatma Otoo

No.	Pos.	Nation	Player
19	MF	NOR	Ole Amund Sveen
20	FW	NOR	Kristian Fardal Opseth
21	GK	NOR	Kristian Rutlin
22	MF	NOR	Lars Christian Kjemhus
23	MF	NOR	Edin Øy
25	MF	NOR	Ruben Holsæter
26	DF	DEN	Magnus Pedersen
27	MF	NOR	Eirik Birkelund
28	DF	NOR	Joar Tryti
29	GK	NOR	Stefan Hagerup
31	MF	NOR	Orjan Hippe Sørflaten
35	MF	NOR	Johan Hove

=== Out on loan ===
Note: Flags indicate national team as defined under FIFA eligibility rules; some limited exceptions apply. Players may hold more than one non-FIFA nationality.

No.	Pos.	Nation	Player
5	DF	NOR	Victor Grodås (on loan at Kristiansund)
6	MF	NOR	Peter Aase (on loan at Florø)
8	FW	NOR	Fredrik Flo (on loan at Fana)

No.	Pos.	Nation	Player
24	DF	NOR	Eirik Bergum Skaasheim (on loan at Hødd)
34	MF	NOR	Simen Brekkhus (on loan at Florø)

== Transfers ==
=== Winter ===
In: Note: Flags indicate national team as defined under FIFA eligibility rules; some limited exceptions apply. Players may hold more than one non-FIFA nationality.

No.	Pos.	Nation	Player
10	FW	GHA	Gilbert Koomson (from (Thailand) BEC Tero Sasana)
11	FW	NOR	Martin Ramsland (from (Norway) Strømmen)
15	DF	FIN	Jukka Raitala (free agent)
19	MF	NOR	Ole Amund Sveen (from (Norway) Hødd)
26	DF	DEN	Magnus Pedersen (on loan from (Denmark) OB)
27	MF	NOR	Eirik Birkelund (free agent)
—	MF	NOR	Eirik Bakke (from retirement)

Out: Note: Flags indicate national team as defined under FIFA eligibility rules; some limited exceptions apply. Players may hold more than one non-FIFA nationality.

No.	Pos.	Nation	Player
6	MF	NOR	Peter Aase (on loan to (Norway) Åsane)
10	MF	NOR	Thomas Drage (released)
11	FW	NGR	Osita Henry Chikere (released)
15	MF	NOR	Petter Strand (to (Norway) Molde)
23	MF	NOR	Edin Øy (on loan to (Norway) Førde)
24	DF	NOR	Eirik Bergum Skaasheim (on loan to (Norway) Hødd)
—	DF	NOR	Sindre Austevoll (to (Norway) Åsane)
—	FW	NOR	Kristoffer Ryland (on loan to (Norway) Florø)

=== Summer ===
In: Note: Flags indicate national team as defined under FIFA eligibility rules; some limited exceptions apply. Players may hold more than one non-FIFA nationality.

No.	Pos.	Nation	Player
6	MF	NOR	Henrik Furebotn (from (Norway) Bodø/Glimt)
16	DF	NOR	Vegard Leikvoll Moberg (from (Norway) Åsane)
26	DF	DEN	Magnus Pedersen (from (Denmark) OB, previously on loan)
29	GK	NOR	Stefan Hagerup (loan return from (Norway) Ull/Kisa)
35	MF	NOR	Johan Hove (Promoted)

Out: Note: Flags indicate national team as defined under FIFA eligibility rules; some limited exceptions apply. Players may hold more than one non-FIFA nationality.

No.	Pos.	Nation	Player
5	DF	NOR	Victor Grodås (on loan to (Norway) Kristiansund)
6	MF	NOR	Peter Aase (on loan to (Norway) Florø, previously on loan at (Norway) Åsane)
8	FW	NOR	Fredrik Flo (on loan to (Norway) Fana)
16	MF	SEN	Babacar Sarr (to (Norway) Molde)
29	GK	NOR	Stefan Hagerup (on loan to (Norway) Ull/Kisa)
34	MF	NOR	Simen Brekkhus (on loan to (Norway) Florø)

== Competitions ==
=== Tippeligaen ===
==== Results summary ====
Overall								Home						Away					
Pld	W	D	L	GF	GA	GD	Pts	W	D	L	GF	GA	GD	W	D	L	GF	GA	GD
30	8	12	10	33	37	−4	36	4	7	4	20	19	+1	4	5	6	13	18	−5

Last updated: 10 November 2016.
Source: see below

==== Results by round ====
Round	1	2	3	4	5	6	7	8	9	10	11	12	13	14	15	16	17	18	19	20	21	22	23	24	25	26	27	28	29	30
Ground	A	H	A	H	A	H	A	H	A	H	A	H	H	A	H	A	H	A	H	A	A	H	A	H	A	H	A	H	A	H
Result	L	W	D	W	L	L	L	D	W	D	D	D	D	W	W	D	D	W	L	L	D	D	L	W	W	D	D	L	L	L
Position	15	7	9	7	9	10	12	11	10	10	10	10	10	9	9	9	9	8	9	9	9	10	10	9	9	9	9	10	10	11

Updated to match(es) played on 10 November 2016. Source: see below
A = Away; H = Home; W = Win; D = Draw; L = Loss

==== Results ====
13 March 2016 1	Bodø/Glimt	2–0	Sogndal	Bodø
18:00 CEST (UTC+2)	Jonassen 42'; Jevtović 86'	Summary		Stadium: Aspmyra Stadion; Attendance: 2,398; Referee: Dag Vidar Hafsås

20 March 2016 2	Sogndal	1–0	Vålerenga	Sogndalsfjøra
15:30 CET (UTC+1)	Ramsland 12'	Summary		Stadium: Fosshaugane Campus; Attendance: 3,453; Referee: Kai Erik Steen

3 April 2016 3	Sarpsborg 08	0–0	Sogndal	Sarpsborg
18:00 CEST (UTC+2)	Lund Nielsen (yellow card) 53'	Summary	Bolseth (yellow card) 10'	Stadium: Sarpsborg Stadion; Attendance: 3,308; Referee: Svein-Erik Edvartsen

8 April 2016 4	Sogndal	1–0	Haugesund	Sogndalsfjøra
19:00 CEST (UTC+2)	Otoo 33'	Summary	Tubić (yellow card) 29'; Skjerve (yellow card) 40'	Stadium: Fosshaugane Campus; Attendance: 2,753; Referee: Tore Hansen

16 April 2016 5	Strømsgodset	2–1	Sogndal	Drammen
15:30 CEST (UTC+2)	Hamoud (yellow card) 23'; Høiland (penalty missed); Pedersen 63', 70'	Summary	Sarr (yellow card) 36' (yellow-red card) 60'; Utvik 47'; Psyché (yellow card) 67'	Stadium: Marienlyst Stadion; Attendance: 6,497; Referee: Espen Eskås

20 April 2016 6	Sogndal	0–1	Odd	Sogndalsfjøra
19:00 CEST (UTC+2)	Koomson (yellow card) 32'	Summary	Samuelsen 53' (pen.)	Stadium: Fosshaugane Campus; Attendance: 2,688; Referee: Martin Lundby

23 April 2016 7	Brann	2–0	Sogndal	Bergen
18:00 CEST (UTC+2)	Acosta 24'; Haugen 51'	Summary		Stadium: Brann Stadion; Attendance: 11,628; Referee: Trond Ivar Døvle

1 May 2016 8	Sogndal	1–1	Rosenborg	Sogndalsfjøra
18:00 CEST UTC+2	Sarr 9'; Patronen (yellow card) 22' (yellow-red card) 69'	Summary	Konradsen 72'	Stadium: Fosshaugane Campus; Attendance: 4,082; Referee: Tom Harald Hagen

8 May 2016 9	Aalesund	1–4	Sogndal	Ålesund
18:00 CEST (UTC+2)	Mos 1'; Carlsen (yellow card) 40'	Summary	Sveen 13'; Birkelund (yellow card) 47'; Kirkeskov 51' (o.g.); Ramsland 64'; Koomson 66'	Stadium: Color Line Stadion; Attendance: 5,408; Referee: Ola Hobber Nilsen

12 May 2016 10	Sogndal	0–0	Tromsø	Sogndalsfjøra
19:00 CEST (UTC+2)	Koomson (yellow card) 90+4'	Summary		Stadium: Fosshaugane Campus; Attendance: 2,639; Referee: Svein Oddvar Moen

16 May 2016 11	Viking	0–0	Sogndal	Stavanger
18:00 CEST (UTC+2)		Summary	Ramsland (yellow card) 24'; Raitala (yellow card) 72'	Stadium: Viking Stadion; Attendance: 11,321; Referee: Trygve Kjensli

22 May 2016 12	Sogndal	2–2	Start	Sogndalsfjøra
18:00 CEST (UTC+2)	Psyché 10' 53'; Kjemhus (yellow card) 37'; Sarr (yellow card) 84'	Summary	DeJohn (yellow card) 15' (goal) 62'; Hoff 81'	Stadium: Fosshaugane Campus; Attendance: 2,770; Referee: Kai Erik Steen

29 May 2016 13	Sogndal	2–2	Lillestrøm	Sogndalsfjøra
15:30 CEST (UTC+2)	Sarr 49'; Opseth 53'	Summary	Martin 29'; Jradi 39'	Stadium: Fosshaugane Campus; Attendance: 2,869; Referee: Ola Hobber Nilsen

3 July 2016 14	Stabæk	0–1	Sogndal	Bærum
18:00 CEST (UTC+2)	Eghan (yellow card) 90+3'	Summary	Kjemhus (yellow card) 56'; Otoo 73', (yellow card) 74'; Sarr (yellow card) 76'; Ramsland (yellow card) 86'	Stadium: Nadderud Stadion; Attendance: 3,052; Referee: Tom Harald Hagen

9 July 2016 15	Sogndal	4–3	Molde	Sogndalsfjøra
20:00 CEST (UTC+2)	Patronen 3'; Kjemhus 24', 50'; Sveen 30'; Teniste (yellow card) 67'; Opseth (yellow card) 84'	Summary	Toivio 21'; Singh 88', 90'	Stadium: Fosshaugane Campus; Attendance: 3,217; Referee: Tore Hansen

15 July 2016 16	Vålerenga	1–1	Sogndal	Oslo
19:00 CEST (UTC+2)	Zahid 17'; Tollås (yellow card) 30'; Larsen (yellow card) 65'	Summary	Sveen 69'	Stadium: Ullevaal Stadion; Attendance: 7,074; Referee: Kim Andre Johnsen

24 July 2016 17	Sogndal	2–2	Bodø/Glimt	Sogndalsfjøra
18:00 CEST (UTC+2)	Opseth 74'; Sveen 85'; Ramsland (yellow card) 88'	Summary	Olsen 17', 61'; Edvardsen (yellow card) 90'	Stadium: Fosshaugane Campus; Attendance: 3,219; Referee: Dag Vidar Hafsås

31 July 2016 18	Haugesund	0–1	Sogndal	Haugesund
18:00 CEST (UTC+2)	Skjerve (yellow card) 66'; Tronstad (yellow card) 90+1'	Summary	Sveen 55'; Kjemhus (yellow card) 63'; Koomson (yellow card) 72'	Stadium: Haugesund Stadion; Attendance: 4,432; Referee: Tom Harald Hagen

7 August 2016 19	Sogndal	1–2	Viking	Sogndalsfjøra
20:00 CEST (UTC+2)	Sveen (yellow card) 70'; Holsæter (yellow card) 88'; Otoo 90'	Summary	Sverrisson 39'; Adegbenro (yellow card) 61' (goal) 80'; Ibrahim (yellow card) 86'	Stadium: Fosshaugane Campus; Attendance: 2,906; Referee: Espen Eskås

14 August 2016 20	Rosenborg	3–1	Sogndal	Trondheim
18:00 CEST (UTC+2)	Midtsjø 15'; Bakenga 37'; Svensson 40'; Midtsjø (yellow card) 53'	Summary	Patronen (yellow card) 33'; Svensson 75' (o.g.)	Stadium: Lerkendal Stadion; Attendance: 15,328; Referee: Trond Ivar Døvle

21 August 2016 21	Start	1–1	Sogndal	Kristiansand
18:00 CEST (UTC+2)	Børufsen (yellow card) 13'; Johnson (yellow card) 82'; Salvesen 89'	Summary	Furebotn 7'; Pedersen (yellow card) 55'; Raitala (yellow card) 81'	Stadium: Sør Arena; Attendance: 4,157; Referee: Kristoffer Hagenes

28 August 2016 22	Sogndal	1–1	Stabæk	Sogndalsfjøra
15:30 CEST (UTC+2)	Ramsland 70'; Patronen (yellow card) 90'	Summary	Kassi (yellow card) 30'; Mehmeti (yellow card) 39'; Hanche-Olsen (yellow card) 50'; Meling 78'	Stadium: Fosshaugane Campus; Attendance: 3,004; Referee: Kai-Erik Steen

11 September 2016 23	Tromsø	2–0	Sogndal	Tromsø
15:30 CEST (UTC+2)	Wangberg 26'; Jenssen 41'; Norbye (yellow card) 57'; Espejord (yellow card) 59'; Antonsen (yellow card) 68'; Ingebrigtsen (yellow card) 68'	Summary	Birkelund (yellow card) 42'	Stadium: Alfheim Stadion; Attendance: 3,135; Referee: Espen Eskås

18 September 2016 24	Sogndal	3–0	Sarpsborg 08	Sogndalsfjøra
15:30 CEST (UTC+2)	Ramsland 15'; Furebotn (yellow card) 29'; Sveen 74'; Koomson 83'	Summary		Stadium: Fosshaugane Campus; Attendance: 2,713; Referee: Trygve Kjensli

25 September 2016 25	Lillestrøm	1–2	Sogndal	Lillestrøm
15:30 CEST (UTC+2)	Kippe (red card) 64'; Mathew 69'	Summary	Koomson 65' (pen.); Sveen 72'	Stadium: Åråsen Stadion; Attendance: 7,088; Referee: Svein-Erik Edvartsen

1 October 2016 26	Sogndal	0–0	Brann	Sogndalsfjøra
18:00 CEST (UTC+2)	Ramsland (yellow card) 32'; Bolseth (yellow card) 58'; Furebotn (yellow card) 61'	Summary	Acosta (red card) 32'; Braaten (yellow card) 86'; Leciejewski (yellow card) 90+3'	Stadium: Fosshaugane Campus; Attendance: 5,600; Referee: Martin Lundby

16 October 2016 27	Molde	0–0	Sogndal	Molde
18:00 CEST (UTC+2)		Summary		Stadium: Aker Stadion; Attendance: 7,745; Referee: Trygve Kjensli

23 October 2016 28	Sogndal	0–1	Strømsgodset	Sogndalsfjøra
20:00 CEST (UTC+2)		Summary	Andersen 89'	Stadium: Fosshaugane Campus; Attendance: 2,375; Referee: Trond Ivar Døvle

30 October 2016 29	Odd	3–1	Sogndal	Skien
18:00 CET (UTC+1)	Nordkvelle 67'; Mladenovic 77'; Zekhnini 85'	Summary	Raitala 5'	Stadium: Skagerak Arena; Attendance: 9,851; Referee: Ola Hobber Nilsen

6 November 2016 30	Sogndal	2–4	Aalesund	Sogndalsfjøra
18:00 CET (UTC+1)	Psyché 3'; Ramsland 17' (yellow card) 65'; Bolseth (yellow card) 51'; Patronen (yellow card) 78'	Summary	Abdellaoue 12'; Þrándarson 23'; Gyasi 35'; Kirkeskov (yellow card) 52'; Teniste 76' (o.g.); Arnarson (yellow card) 80'	Stadium: Fosshaugane Campus; Attendance: 2,864; Referee: Tom Harald Hagen

==== Table ====
Pos	Team	Pld	W	D	L	GF	GA	GD	Pts
9	Aalesund	30	12	6	12	46	51	−5	42
10	Vålerenga	30	10	8	12	41	39	+2	38
11	Sogndal	30	8	12	10	33	37	−4	36
12	Lillestrøm	30	8	10	12	45	50	−5	34
13	Tromsø	30	9	7	14	36	46	−10	34

Source: Football Association of Norway (in Norwegian), Soccerway
Rules for classification: 1) Points; 2) Goal difference; 3) Goals scored; 4) Head-to-head points; 5) Head-to-head goal difference; 6) Head-to-head away goals scored (between two teams).

=== Norwegian Cup ===
13 April 2016 First Round	Valdres	1–5	Sogndal	Fagernes
18:00 CEST (UTC+2)	Mönell 87'	Report	Opseth 4'; Sarr 8'; Holsæter 53'; Flo 64', 89'	Stadium: Blåbærmyra; Attendance: 700; Referee: Tommy Frydenlund

28 April 2016 Second Round	Førde	0–1	Sogndal	Førde
18:00 CEST (UTC+2)	C.Kvist (yellow card) 53'; T.Dvergsdal (yellow card) 68'; V.Savland (yellow card) 83'	Report	Bolseth 67'	Stadium: Førde stadion Attendance: 2,800; Referee: Kristoffer Hagenes

4 May 2016 Third Round	Nest-Sotra	1–0	Sogndal	Ågotnes
18:00 CEST (UTC+2)	J.Furdal (yellow card) 15'; Pluemjai 73'; O.Rødahl (yellow card) 90+2'	Report	Birkelund (yellow card) 22'	Stadium: Ågotnes Stadion; Attendance: 350; Referee: Trond Ivar Døvle

== Squad statistics ==
As of match played 6 November 2016

=== Appearances and goals ===
No.	Pos	Nat	Player	Total		Tippeligaen		Norwegian Cup	
No.	Pos	Nat	Player	Apps	Goals	Apps	Goals	Apps	Goals
1	GK	(Norway) NOR	Mathias Dyngeland	33	0	30	0	3	0
2	DF	(Estonia) EST	Taijo Teniste	29	0	27	0	2	0
3	DF	(Norway) NOR	Bjørn Inge Utvik	20	1	16+4	1	0	0
4	DF	(Finland) FIN	Hannu Patronen	24	1	19+4	1	1	0
6	MF	(Norway) NOR	Henrik Furebotn	13	1	13	1	0	0
7	MF	(Norway) NOR	Rune Bolseth	27	1	16+9	0	2	1
10	MF	(Ghana) GHA	Gilbert Koomson	31	3	27+1	3	2+1	0
11	FW	(Norway) NOR	Martin Ramsland	30	5	27+1	5	0+2	0
15	DF	(Finland) FIN	Jukka Raitala	28	1	28	1	0	0
16	DF	(Norway) NOR	Vegard Leikvoll Moberg	6	0	2+4	0	0	0
17	DF	(France) FRA	Christophe Psyché	32	3	27+2	3	3	0
18	FW	(Ghana) GHA	Mahatma Otoo	23	2	9+11	2	3	0
19	MF	(Norway) NOR	Ole Amund Sveen	28	8	27+1	8	0	0
20	FW	(Norway) NOR	Kristian Fardal Opseth	21	4	2+16	2	3	2
22	MF	(Norway) NOR	Lars Christian Kjemhus	27	2	19+5	2	3	0
23	MF	(Norway) NOR	Edin Øy	1	0	0+1	0	0	0
25	MF	(Norway) NOR	Ruben Holsæter	13	1	0+10	0	2+1	1
26	DF	(Denmark) DEN	Magnus Pedersen	9	0	4+3	0	1+1	0
27	MF	(Norway) NOR	Eirik Birkelund	28	1	21+5	0	2	1
28	DF	(Norway) NOR	Joar Tryti	2	0	0+2	0	0	0
31	MF	(Norway) NOR	Orjan Hippe Sørflaten	1	0	0	0	0+1	0
35	MF	(Norway) NOR	Johan Hove	1	0	0+1	0	0	0
Players away from Strømsgodset on loan:
5	DF	(Norway) NOR	Victor Grodås	1	0	0+1	0	0	0
8	FW	(Norway) NOR	Fredrik Flo	3	0	0+1	0	0+2	0
34	MF	(Norway) NOR	Simen Brekkhus	6	0	1+3	0	2	0
Players who appeared for Strømsgodset no longer at the club:
16	MF	(Senegal) SEN	Babacar Sarr	18	3	15	2	3	1

=== Goal scorers ===
Place	Position	Nation	Number	Name	Tippeligaen	Norwegian Cup	Total
1	MF	(Norway)	19	Ole Amund Sveen	8	0	8
2	FW	(Norway)	11	Martin Ramsland	5	0	5
3	FW	(Norway)	20	Kristian Fardal Opseth	2	2	4
4	MF	(Ghana)	10	Gilbert Koomson	3	0	3
4	DF	(France)	17	Christophe Psyché	3	0	3
4	MF	(Senegal)	16	Babacar Sarr	2	1	3
7	FW	(Ghana)	18	Mahatma Otoo	2	0	2
7	MF	(Norway)	22	Lars Christian Kjemhus	2	0	2
7				Own goal	2	0	2
10	DF	(Finland)	4	Hannu Patronen	1	0	1
10	MF	(Norway)	6	Henrik Furebotn	1	0	1
10	DF	(Finland)	15	Jukka Raitala	1	0	1
10	DF	(Norway)	3	Bjørn Inge Utvik	1	0	1
10	MF	(Norway)	7	Rune Bolseth	0	1	0
10	MF	(Norway)	25	Ruben Holsæter	0	1	0
10	MF	(Norway)	27	Eirik Birkelund	0	1	0
				TOTALS	33	6	39

=== Disciplinary record ===
Number	Nation	Position	Name	Tippeligaen		Norwegian Cup		Total	
Number	Nation	Position	Name	Yellow card	Red card	Yellow card	Red card	Yellow card	Red card
2	(Estonia)	DF	Taijo Teniste	1	0	0	0	1	0
4	(Finland)	DF	Hannu Patronen	5	1	0	0	5	1
6	(Finland)	MF	Henrik Furebotn	2	0	0	0	2	0
7	(Norway)	MF	Rune Bolseth	3	0	0	0	3	0
10	(Ghana)	MF	Gilbert Koomson	3	0	0	0	3	0
11	(Norway)	FW	Martin Ramsland	5	0	0	0	5	0
15	(Finland)	DF	Jukka Raitala	2	0	0	0	2	0
16	(Senegal)	MF	Babacar Sarr	4	1	0	0	4	1
17	(France)	DF	Christophe Psyché	1	0	0	0	1	0
18	(Ghana)	FW	Mahatma Otoo	1	0	0	0	1	0
19	(Finland)	MF	Ole Amund Sveen	1	0	0	0	1	0
20	(Finland)	FW	Kristian Fardal Opseth	1	0	0	0	1	0
22	(Finland)	MF	Lars Christian Kjemhus	3	0	0	0	3	0
25	(Finland)	MF	Ruben Holsæter	1	0	0	0	1	0
26	(Denmark)	DF	Magnus Pedersen	1	0	0	0	1	0
27	(Norway)	MF	Eirik Birkelund	2	0	1	0	3	0
			TOTALS	36	2	1	0	37	2
