= Christophe Psyché =

French footballer (born 1988)

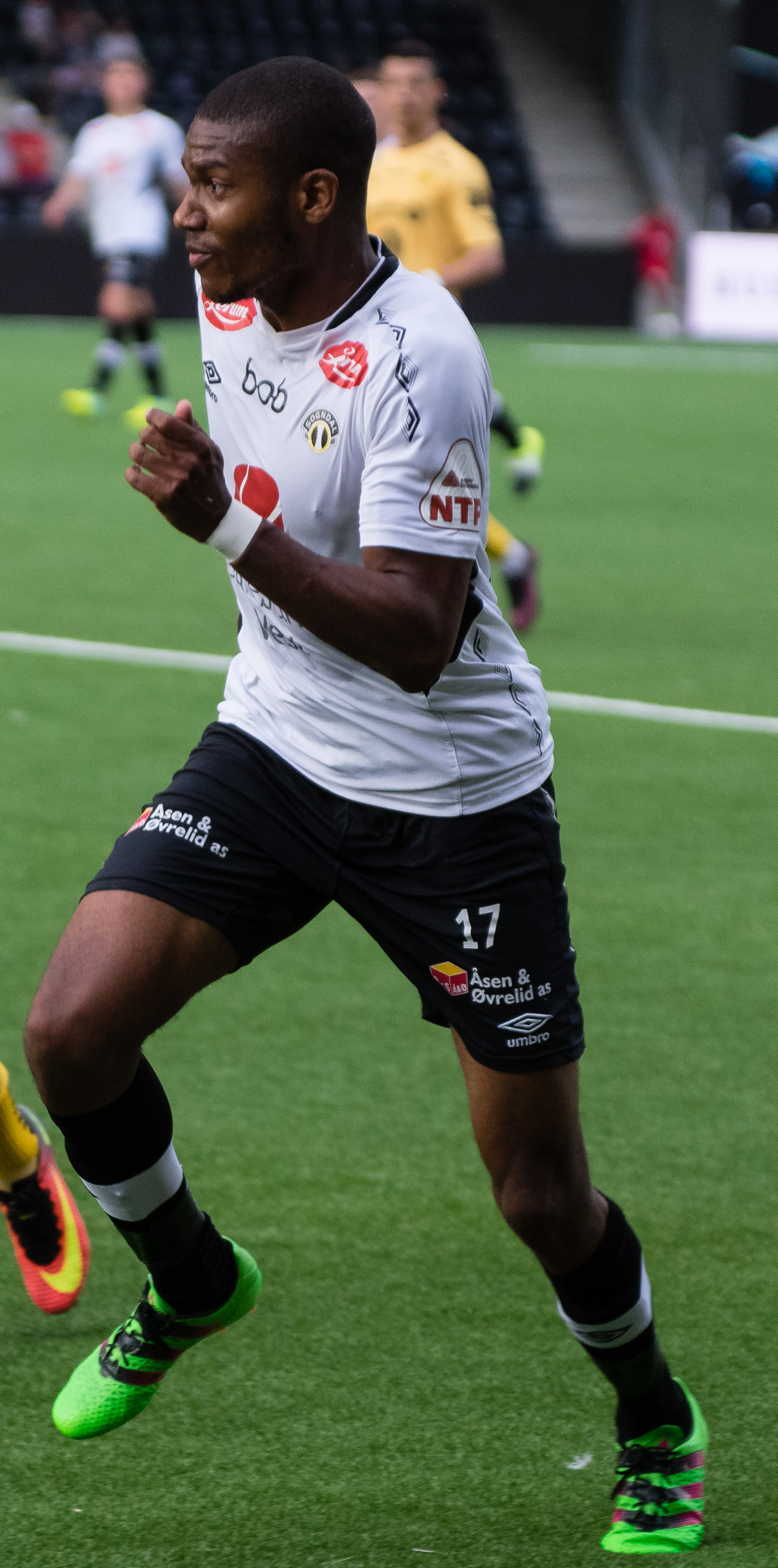

Personal information
- Full name: Christophe Charles Steven René Psyché
- Date of birth: 28 July 1988 (age 38)
- Place of birth: Cannes, France
- Height: 1.88 m (6 ft 2 in)
- Position: Defender

Senior career*
Years	Team	Apps	(Gls)
2008–2010	Oslo City	2	(0)
2011	Løv-Ham	13	(0)
2011–2013	Kristiansund	54	(3)
2014	HamKam	14	(0)
2014–2018	Sogndal	73	(6)
2018	Baník Ostrava	7	(0)
2018–2021	Kristiansund	61	(9)
2021	AEL Limassol	5	(0)
2021–2024	Tromsø	76	(3)
- * Club domestic league appearances and goals as of 4 December 2024

Christophe Charles Steven René Psyché (born 28 July 1988) is a French footballer who plays as a defender, and who last played for Tromsø. He has previously played for Baník Ostrava, Sogndal, HamKam, Løv-Ham and Oslo City.

== Career ==
Psyché was born in Cannes and he started his career with Oslo City.

After short spells with Løv-Ham, Kristiansund and HamKam, Psyché joined Sogndal in 2014. He made his debut for Sogndal in a 1-3 defeat against Odd.

On 18 January 2018, Psyché signed a two-year deal with Czech team FC Baník Ostrava, before going back to former club Kristiansund.

After four seasons at Tromsø, the club confirmed that Psyche's contract would not be extended, and his time at the club would come to and end after the 2024 season.

== Career statistics ==
As of 22 January 2025

Club	Season	Division	League		Cup (Note: Includes Norwegian Cup, Cypriot Cup)		Total	
Club	Season	Division	Apps	Goals	Apps	Goals	Apps	Goals
Oslo City	2010	2. divisjon	2	0	0	0	2	0
Løv-Ham	2011	1. divisjon	13	0	2	1	15	1
Kristiansund	2011	2. divisjon	3	0	0	0	3	0
Kristiansund	2012	2. divisjon	25	0	2	1	27	1
Kristiansund	2013	1. divisjon	26	3	2	1	28	4
Kristiansund	Total		54	3	4	2	58	5
HamKam	2014	1. divisjon	14	0	3	0	17	0
Sogndal	2014	Eliteserien	10	2	0	0	10	2
Sogndal	2015	1. divisjon	28	1	3	1	31	2
Sogndal	2016	Eliteserien	29	3	3	0	32	3
Sogndal	2017	Eliteserien	6	0	0	0	6	0
Sogndal	Total		73	6	6	1	79	7
Baník Ostrava	2018	Czech First League	7	0	0	0	7	0
Kristiansund	2018	Eliteserien	13	0	0	0	13	0
Kristiansund	2019	Eliteserien	26	7	1	0	27	7
Kristiansund	2020	Eliteserien	22	2	—		22	2
Kristiansund	Total		61	9	1	0	62	9
AEL Limassol	2020–21	Cypriot First Division	5	0	3	0	8	0
Tromsø	2021	Eliteserien	16	0	0	0	16	0
Tromsø	2022	Eliteserien	27	2	1	0	28	2
Tromsø	2023	Eliteserien	26	1	2	0	28	1
Tromsø	2024	Eliteserien	7	0	2	0	9	0
Tromsø	Total		76	3	5	0	81	3
Career total			304	21	21	4	325	25
