= Reiss Greenidge =

Guyanese footballer (born 1996)

Personal information
- Full name: Reiss James Greenidge
- Date of birth: 8 February 1996 (age 30)
- Place of birth: Enfield, England
- Height: 1.98 m (6 ft 6 in)
- Position: Defender

Team information
- Current team: Sittingbourne

Youth career
- –2013: Arsenal
- 2013–2014: West Bromwich Albion

Senior career*
Years	Team	Apps	(Gls)
2014–2016	West Bromwich Albion	0	(0)
2014	→ Port Vale (loan)	0	(0)
2015	→ Ipswich Town (loan)	0	(0)
2016–2017	Ebbsfleet United	6	(0)
2016	→ Hemel Hempstead Town (loan)	8	(0)
2016	→ Hemel Hempstead Town (loan)	7	(0)
2016	→ Hemel Hempstead Town (loan)	4	(0)
2017–2018	Sogndal	19	(1)
2019–2020	Arendal	19	(1)
2020–2022	Bolton Wanderers	5	(0)
2021–2022	→ Barnet (loan)	24	(2)
2022–2025	Maidstone United	67	(6)
2025–2026	Slough Town	25	(1)
2026–	Sittingbourne	0	(0)

International career^{‡}
2021–	Guyana	13	(0)
- * Club domestic league appearances and goals as of 16:24, 24 July 2026 (UTC) ‡ National team caps and goals as of 19:44, 26 April 2026 (UTC)

Reiss James Greenidge (born 8 February 1996) is a semi-professional footballer who plays as a defender for Isthmian League South East Division club Sittingbourne. Born in England, he represents the Guyana national team. His brother, Jordan, is also a professional footballer.

Greenidge spent time at Arsenal and West Bromwich Albion and had unsuccessful loan spells at Port Vale and Ipswich Town, before joining Ebbsfleet United in January 2016. From there, he was loaned to Hemel Hempstead Town. He travelled to Norway in July 2017 to sign for Sogndal. He played first and second-tier football for the club before joining third-tier side Arendal in January 2019. He returned to England to sign for Bolton Wanderers in August 2020, who went on to win promotion out of League Two at the end of the 2020–21 season. He was loaned out to Barnet for the 2021–22 season. In October 2022, he signed for Maidstone United, where he won the Kent Senior Cup in 2024. He moved on to Slough Town in June 2025, where he stayed for one season before joining Sittingbourne.

== Career ==
=== Early career ===
Greenidge spent time at Arsenal's Academy, before joining West Bromwich Albion in 2013. In a later interview he said "I learned how to play football at West Brom". He joined Port Vale on loan in September 2014, with the loan expiring on 31 December 2014. He also spent time on loan at Ipswich Town, though only played for the under-21 team. He was never in a first-team matchday squad at West Brom, Port Vale, or Ipswich.

Following his release from West Brom, Greenidge went on trial with Watford, AFC Wimbledon and Crystal Palace before signing with Ebbsfleet United in January 2016. He made his competitive debut for the "Fleet" on 16 February, in a 1–1 draw at Oxford City, coming on as a 81st-minute substitute for Aaron McLean. Three days later he joined National League South rivals Hemel Hempstead Town on a one-month loan deal. He scored his first senior goal on 4 October 2016, in a 2–1 victory over Sheppey United at Stonebridge Road. He asked Ebbsfleet manager Daryl McMahon not to send him out on loan for the 2016–17 season after an impressive pre-season. However, he rejoined Hemel Hempstead Town on an initial two-month loan deal on 9 November 2016. On 6 February 2017, he returned to Hemel Hempstead for a third loan spell. He was released by Ebbfleet on 5 June 2017.

=== Norway ===
In July 2017, Greenidge signed for Norwegian Eliteserien club Sogndal, having had trials at Viking FK and IK Start. He played ten league games in the 2017 season and also featured twice in the relegation play-offs as Sogndal were relegated after losing a penalty shoot-out to Ranheim. He played nine games in the 2018 campaign. On 30 January 2019, Greenidge joined 2. divisjon side Arendal on a two-year deal. He scored one goal in 19 games in the 2019 season.

=== Bolton Wanderers ===
On 4 August 2020, Greenidge signed for English League Two side Bolton Wanderers on a two-year deal. He made his debut for the "Trotters" at the University of Bolton Stadium on 12 September, in a 1–0 defeat by Forest Green Rovers in Bolton's first league match of the 2020–21 season. He played seven games as Bolton secured promotion in third-place, though did not feature after being sent off in a 1–0 defeat to Crawley Town at the University of Bolton Stadium on 2 January. On 3 May 2022, the club confirmed that he would be released at the end of his contract.

==== Barnet (loan) ====
On 21 July 2021, Greenidge joined National League side Barnet on a season-long loan deal which the "Bees" reported to be "with a view to a permanent move". He made 28 appearances for the "Bees" in the 2021–22 season, scoring two goals.

=== Maidstone United ===
On 21 October 2022, Greenidge signed for National League side Maidstone United. He made twelve appearances in the 2022–23 season as Maidstone were relegated in last place. Maidstone defeated EFL clubs Barrow and Stevenage to reach the fourth round of the FA Cup, where they then knocked out Championship side Ipswich Town 2–1 at Portman Road, with Greenidge playing as a second-half substitute in the win over Ipswich.

He played in the 2024 Kent Senior Cup final victory over Ebbsfleet United. He played against his brother, who played for Dartford and shared a house with him, three times in the 2023–24 season. He featured 36 times in the 2024–25 campaign, playing all three matches of the play-offs, including the play-off final defeat to Boreham Wood. He was released upon the expiry of his contract.

=== Slough Town ===
On 16 June 2025, Greenidge joined his brother Jordan at National League South side Slough Town. He featured 28 times in the 2025–26 campaign, and was released at the end of his contract in June. His brother had already left the club in December.

=== Sittingbourne ===
On 21 July 2026, with his brother having joined the club the same day, Greenidge joined Isthmian League South East Division club Sittingbourne.

== International career ==
Greenidge was called up to the Guyana national football team in March 2019. Two years later he was called up for Guyana's qualifiers for the 2021 CONCACAF Gold Cup. His debut came on 3 July 2021 where he started and scored an own goal after deflecting a shot from Stheven Robles in a 4–0 defeat against Guatemala, which eliminated Guyana from Gold Cup qualification. He played in the 2025 CONCACAF Gold Cup qualification games, where Guyana again lost out to Guatemala.

== Style of play ==
Greenidge is a pacey 6 ft 6 in (1.98 m) defender.

== Personal life ==
He was reported to be the grandson of Barbados cricketer Sir Gordon Greenidge, though this was later reported to be untrue.

His brother, Jordan, also plays non-League football.

== Career statistics ==
=== Club ===
As of match played 25 April 2026

Appearances and goals by club, season and competition
Club	Season	League			National cup (Note: Includes FA Cup, Norwegian Football Cup)		Other		Total	
Club	Season	Division	Apps	Goals	Apps	Goals	Apps	Goals	Apps	Goals
West Bromwich Albion	2014–15	Premier League	0	0	0	0	0	0	0	0
West Bromwich Albion	2015–16	Premier League	0	0	0	0	0	0	0	0
West Bromwich Albion	Total		0	0	0	0	0	0	0	0
Port Vale (loan)	2014–15	League One	0	0	0	0	0	0	0	0
Ipswich Town (loan)	2014–15	Championship	0	0	0	0	0	0	0	0
Ebbsfleet United	2015–16	National League South	1	0	0	0	0	0	1	0
Ebbsfleet United	2016–17	National League South	5	0	1	0	1 (Note: Appearance(s) in the Kent Senior Cup.)	1	7	1
Ebbsfleet United	Total		6	0	1	0	1	1	8	1
Hemel Hempstead Town (loan)	2015–16	National League South	8	0	0	0	1 (Note: Appearance(s) in the Herts Senior Cup.)	0	9	0
Hemel Hempstead Town (loan)	2016–17	National League South	11	0	0	0	0	0	11	0
Hemel Hempstead Town (loan)	Total		19	0	0	0	1	0	20	0
Sogndal	2017	Eliteserien	10	1	0	0	2 (Note: Appearance(s) in the play-offs.)	0	12	1
Sogndal	2018	1. divisjon	9	0	0	0	0	0	9	0
Sogndal	Total		19	1	0	0	2	0	21	1
Arendal	2019	2. divisjon	19	1	0	0	0	0	19	1
Arendal	2020	2. divisjon	0	0	0	0	0	0	0	0
Arendal	Total		19	1	0	0	0	0	19	1
Bolton Wanderers	2020–21	EFL League Two	5	0	0	0	2 (Note: Appearance(s) in EFL Trophy)	0	7	0
Bolton Wanderers	2021–22	EFL League One	0	0	0	0	0	0	0	0
Bolton Wanderers	Total		5	0	0	0	2	0	7	0
Barnet (loan)	2021–22	National League	24	2	0	0	4 (Note: One appearance in FA Trophy, three appearances in Middlesex Senior Cup)	0	28	2
Maidstone United	2022–23	National League	12	1	0	0	0	0	12	1
Maidstone United	2023–24	National League South	25	3	3	0	3 (Note: One appearance in FA Trophy, one appearance in Kent Senior Cup, one appearances in play-offs)	0	31	3
Maidstone United	2024–25	National League South	30	2	3	0	3	0	36	2
Maidstone United	Total		67	6	6	0	6	0	79	6
Slough Town	2025–26	National League South	25	1	2	0	1 (Note: Appearance(s) in the Birmingham Senior Cup.)	0	28	1
Sittingbourne	2026–27	Isthmian League; South East Division	0	0	0	0	0	0	0	0
Career total			184	11	9	0	17	1	210	10

=== International ===
As of match played 10 June 2025

Appearances and goals by national team and year
National team	Year	Apps	Goals
Guyana
Guyana	2021	1	0
Guyana	2023	3	0
Guyana	2024	5	0
Guyana	2025	4	0
Total		13	0

== Honours ==
Bolton Wanderers

- EFL League Two third-place promotion: 2020–21

Maidstone United

- Kent Senior Cup: 2024
