= Eivind Helgesen =

Norwegian footballer (born 2001)

Personal information
- Date of birth: 10 October 2001 (age 25)
- Place of birth: Sogndal, Norway
- Height: 1.79 m (5 ft 10 in)
- Position: Right-back

Team information
- Current team: Arendal
- Number: 16

Youth career
- 2008–2016: Sogndal

Senior career*
Years	Team	Apps	(Gls)
2016–2019	Sogndal 2	64	(7)
2017–2021	Sogndal	20	(1)
2021	→ Øygarden (loan)	22	(0)
2022–2023	Hødd 2	13	(1)
2022–2024	Hødd	18	(1)
2023	→ Gjøvik-Lyn (loan)	25	(0)
2024–	Arendal	55	(4)

International career
2019	Norway U18	5	(0)
- * Club domestic league appearances and goals as of 12:34, 14 July 2026 (UTC)

Eivind Helgesen (born 10 October 2001) is a Norwegian footballer who plays as a right-back for 2. divisjon side Arendal.

== Early life ==
Helgesen was born in the Sogndal Municipality of Norway to former footballer Trond Helgesen, who had made dozens of appearances in the country's Eliteserien for Sogndal and Hødd.

== Club career ==
Having already featured for the club's second team, Helgesen made his professional debut in Sogndal's 4–0 Eliteserien win over Viking on 13 May 2017. In doing so, he became the first player born in 2001 to feature in the league. After not making in senior appearance in 2018, he signed a professional contract in February 2019 – a deal through 2021. However, he would only make a handful of appearances in 2019, stating that he hoped to feature more after playing in Sogndal's 1–0 loss to Nest-Sotra on 16 May. His first and only goal for the club came in Sogndal's 1. divisjon 6–1 win against Ull/Kisa on 6 July 2020. He joined 2. divisjon club Øygarden on loan in March 2021. He left Sogndal at the end of the 2021 season.

In February 2022, Helgesen signed with 2. divisjon club Hødd – another former club of his father. After two seasons with Hødd, including a loan to 2. divisjon club Gjøvik-Lyn, he joined Arendal in January 2024. In September of the same year, he extended his deal with the club until 2026. He suffered an injury in January 2026, undergoing surgery the same month.

== International career ==
Helgesen was invited to a talent camp in 2016, alongside seven other players from the Sogn og Fjordane region. He was called up to Norway's under-18 squad in January 2019. He made his debut for the under-18 side the following month, in Norway's 3–1 win against Slovakia.

== Style of play ==
A winger in his early career, Helgesen was re-trained as a right-back following his debut with Sogndal.

== Career statistics ==
=== Club ===
As of matches played 14 July 2026.

Appearances and goals by club, season and competition
Club	Season	League			Cup (Note: Includes NM Cupen)		Other		Total	
Club	Season	Division	Apps	Goals	Apps	Goals	Apps	Goals	Apps	Goals
Sogndal 2	2016	3. divisjon	11	0	–		0	0	11	0
Sogndal 2	2017	4. divisjon	18	4	–		0	0	18	4
Sogndal 2	2018	3. divisjon	19	1	–		0	0	19	1
Sogndal 2	2019	3. divisjon	16	2	–		0	0	16	2
Sogndal 2	Total		64	7	0	0	0	0	64	7
Sogndal	2017	Eliteserien	1	0	0	0	0	0	1	0
Sogndal	2018	1. divisjon	0	0	0	0	0	0	0	0
Sogndal	2019	1. divisjon	3	0	2	0	0	0	5	0
Sogndal	2020	1. divisjon	16	1	0	0	0	0	16	1
Sogndal	2021	1. divisjon	0	0	0	0	0	0	0	0
Sogndal	Total		20	1	2	0	0	0	22	1
Øygarden (loan)	2021	2. divisjon	22	0	3	0	0	0	25	0
Hødd 2	2022	3. divisjon	12	1	–		0	0	12	1
Hødd 2	2023	3. divisjon	1	0	–		0	0	1	0
Hødd 2	Total		13	1	0	0	0	0	13	1
Hødd	2022	2. divisjon	18	1	2	0	0	0	20	1
Hødd	2023	1. divisjon	0	0	0	0	0	0	0	0
Hødd	Total		18	1	2	0	0	0	20	1
Gjøvik-Lyn (loan)	2023	2. divisjon	25	0	4	0	0	0	29	0
Arendal	2024	2. divisjon	24	2	3	0	0	0	27	2
Arendal	2025	2. divisjon	20	2	1	0	0	0	21	2
Arendal	2026	2. divisjon	11	0	2	1	0	0	13	1
Arendal	Total		55	4	6	1	0	0	61	5
Career total			217	14	17	1	0	0	234	15
