= Johan Hove =

Norwegian footballer (born 2000)

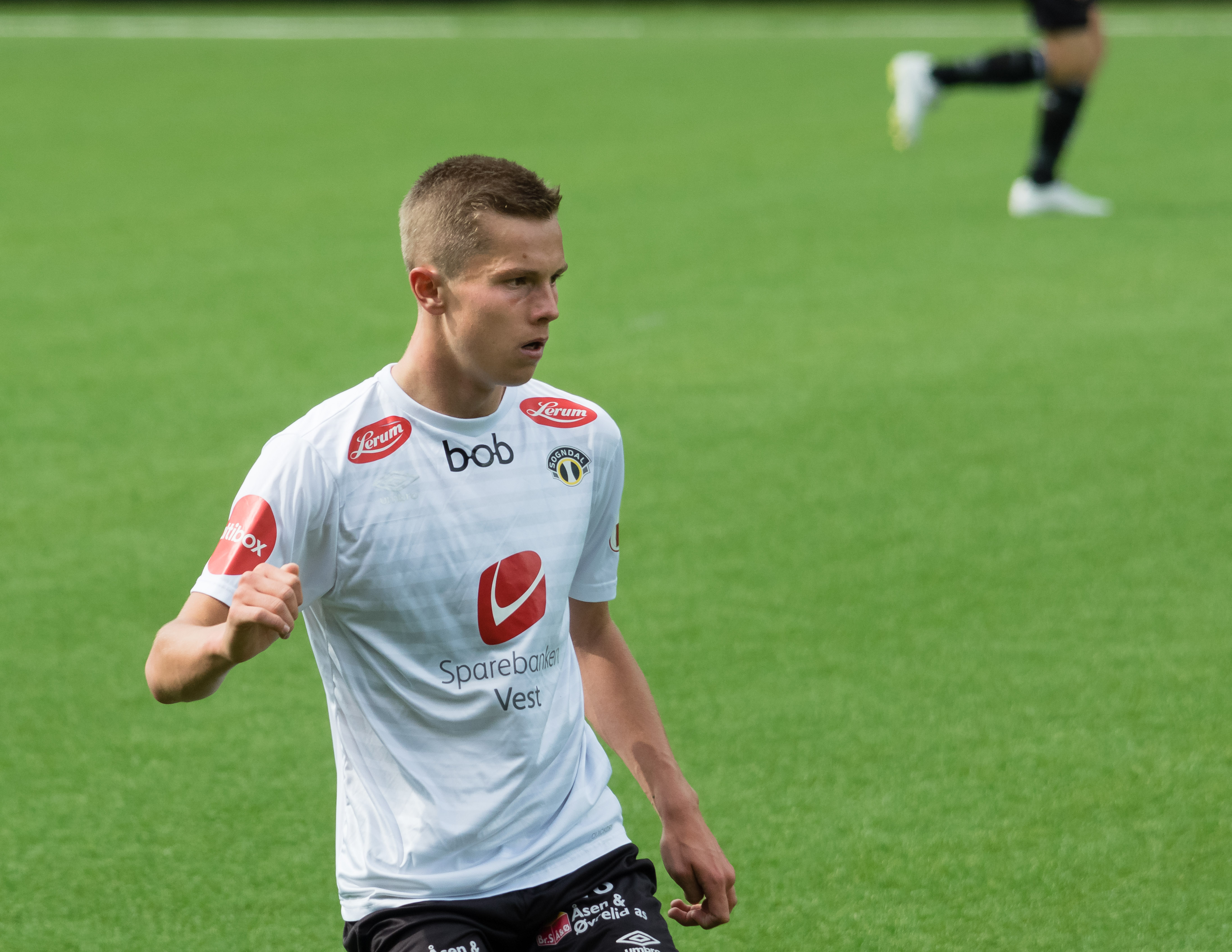
- Hove with Sogndal in 2017

Personal information
- Date of birth: 7 September 2000 (age 26)
- Place of birth: Sogndal, Norway
- Height: 1.77 m (5 ft 10 in)
- Position: Midfielder

Team information
- Current team: AIK
- Number: 8

Senior career*
Years	Team	Apps	(Gls)
2016–2018	Sogndal	25	(0)
2018–2023	Strømsgodset	117	(29)
2023–2025	Groningen	72	(7)
2025–	AIK	40	(13)

International career^{‡}
2015	Norway U15	4	(0)
2016	Norway U16	20	(0)
2017	Norway U17	11	(1)
2018	Norway U18	8	(1)
2019	Norway U19	6	(0)
2019–2023	Norway U21	24	(3)
- * Club domestic league appearances and goals as of 08:35, 17 August 2026 (UTC) ‡ National team caps and goals as of 17:37, 21 August 2023 (UTC)

Johan Hove (Norwegian pronunciation: [/jʊˈhɑːn ˈhɔːʋə]; born 7 September 2000) is a Norwegian professional footballer who plays as a midfielder for AIK in the Allsvenskan.

== Club career ==
=== Sogndal ===
Hove progressed through the Sogndal youth academy. On 8 May 2016, he made his debut in Eliteserien, coming on as a substitute for Ole Amund Sveen in a 4–1 win away over Aalesunds FK. On 19 April 2018, he signed a contract extension keeping him at Sogndal until 31 December 2020.

=== Strømsgodset ===
On 14 August 2018, Hove signed a one-and-a-half-year deal with Strømsgodset. He was assigned the number 8 shirt. On 26 August, he made his debut, coming on as a substitute for Herman Stengel in a 4–3 loss to Rosenborg.

Hove scored his first goal in the Norwegian top division, in a 3–2 win over Haugesund on 31 March 2019. On 18 December 2019, he renewed his contract with Strømsgodset until 30 June 2022. The parties further extended the existing agreement on 21 September 2020, until 30 June 2023.

=== Groningen ===
On 17 January 2023, Hove officially joined Eredivisie side Groningen, signing a contract until June 2026 with the Dutch club.

Following Groningen's relegation from the Eredivisie at the end of the 2022–23 season, Hove announced he was open to leaving the club, but he was not able to land a transfer.

In the final match of the 2023–24 season, he scored Groningen's opening goal in a 2–0 win over promotion rivals Roda JC, helping to secure Groningen's immediate return to the Eredivisie.

=== AIK ===
AIK confirmed on 13 February 2025 that they had signed Hove. His contract with the Swedish club extends to 31 December 2028.

== International career ==
Hove represented Norway at various national youth levels. He made his debut for the Norway under-21 team on 10 September 2019, replacing Tobias Heintz in a 3–0 victory over Hungary, in a friendly played in Felcsút.

== Career statistics ==
As of match played 16 August 2026

Appearances and goals by club, season and competition
Club	Season	League			National cup (Note: Includes Norwegian Football Cup, KNVB Cup, Svenska Cupen)		Europe		Other		Total	
Club	Season	Division	Apps	Goals	Apps	Goals	Apps	Goals	Apps	Goals	Apps	Goals
Sogndal	2016	Eliteserien	3	0	0	0	—		—		3	0
Sogndal	2017	Eliteserien	11	0	2	0	—		1 (Note: Appearance in Eliteserien play-offs)	0	14	0
Sogndal	2018	Norwegian First Division	11	0	1	0	—		—		12	0
Sogndal	Total		25	0	3	0	—		1	0	29	0
Strømsgodset	2018	Eliteserien	5	0	0	0	—		—		5	0
Strømsgodset	2019	Eliteserien	23	2	2	0	—		—		25	2
Strømsgodset	2020	Eliteserien	30	10	—		—		—		30	10
Strømsgodset	2021	Eliteserien	29	6	2	1	—		—		31	7
Strømsgodset	2022	Eliteserien	30	11	4	0	—		—		34	11
Strømsgodset	Total		117	29	8	1	—		—		125	30
Groningen	2022–23	Eredivisie	18	2	0	0	—		—		18	2
Groningen	2023–24	Eerste Divisie	34	5	4	0	—		—		38	5
Groningen	2024–25	Eredivisie	20	0	2	0	—		—		22	0
Groningen	Total		72	7	6	0	—		—		78	7
AIK	2025	Allsvenskan	25	8	3	0	4 (Note: Appearances in UEFA Conference League)	2	—		32	10
AIK	2026	Allsvenskan	15	5	4	1	—		—		19	6
AIK	Total		40	13	7	1	4	2	—		51	16
Career total			254	49	24	5	2	1	1	0	283	53
