= Jordan Greenidge =

English footballer

Personal information
- Full name: Jordan Neil Greenidge
- Date of birth: 5 January 2000 (age 26)
- Place of birth: Enfield Town, London, England
- Position: Forward

Team information
- Current team: Sittingbourne

Youth career
- Reading
- 2016–2018: Stoke City

Senior career*
Years	Team	Apps	(Gls)
2018–2019	Omonia	1	(0)
2019	Badajoz	1	(0)
2021–2022	Newport County	1	(0)
2022	Weymouth	5	(0)
2022	→ Dartford (loan)	5	(3)
2022–2023	Hemel Hempstead Town	12	(3)
2022–2023	→ Tonbridge Angels (loan)	26	(14)
2023–2024	Tonbridge Angels	28	(8)
2024	Dartford	7	(0)
2024–2025	Chelmsford City	29	(7)
2025	Slough Town	11	(1)
2025–2026	Hampton & Richmond Borough	8	(0)
2026–	Sittingbourne	0	(0)
- * Club domestic league appearances and goals as of 16:20, 24 July 2026 (UTC)

Jordan Neil Greenidge (born 5 January 2000) is an English professional footballer who plays as a forward for Isthmian League South East Division club Sittingbourne.

== Career ==
In 2016, Greenidge joined the academy at Stoke City, following time in Reading's youth set-up. During his time at Stoke, Greenidge was part of the side that reached the semi-finals of the FA Youth Cup in 2016–17, scoring Stoke's only two goals in the semi-final in a 9–2 aggregate loss against Manchester City.

In July 2018, Greenidge joined Cypriot First Division side Omonia on a three-year deal. On 24 September 2018, he made his professional debut coming on as a substitute for the final six minutes in place of Cris Montes in a 1–0 loss away to AEK Larnaca.

On 17 January 2019, he left Omonia after just one appearance and two weeks later he joined Spanish Segunda División B side Badajoz.

In August 2021, he joined League Two side Newport County on a one-year contract after impressing in pre-season trials. He made his debut for Newport on 10 August 2021 in the starting line-up for the 1–0 EFL Cup first round win against Ipswich Town. Greenidge scored his first goal for Newport on 12 October 2021 in the 4–3 EFL Trophy defeat to Arsenal Under-21s. On 6 January 2022 Newport terminated Greenidge's contract by mutual consent

On 15 January 2022, Greenidge signed for Weymouth.

On 8 March 2022, Greenidge signed for Dartford on loan from the rest of the 2021–22 season.

On 15 July 2022, Greenidge signed for Hemel Hempstead Town.

On 19 November 2022, Greenidge signed for Tonbridge Angels on an initial month's loan. On 19 December 2022, after scoring three league goals in his first four games, and a hat trick in a FA Trophy game, Greenidge's loan was extended until 8 February 2023.

Having signed for Tonbridge Angels at the start of the 2023–24 season, Greenidge's contract was terminated by the club on 8 March 2024. On the same day, he rejoined his former loan side Dartford for the rest of the season. On 30 April 2024, it was announced the Greenidge would leave Dartford following the expiration of his contract.

On 26 August 2024, Greenidge signed for Chelmsford City. On the same day he signed for the club, Greenidge scored on his debut, scoring the equaliser in a 1–1 draw against Chippenham Town. On 26 March 2025, Chelmsford announced Greenidge had departed the club.

On 3 June 2025, Greenidge joined Slough Town.

On 26 December 2025, Greenidge joined fellow National League South side, Hampton & Richmond Borough.

In July 2026, Greenidge joined Isthmian League South East Division club Sittingbourne.

== Personal life ==
His brother Reiss Greenidge currently plays for Maidstone United having previously played for Bolton Wanderers.
