= Fredrik Flo =

Danish footballer (born 1996)

Personal information
- Full name: Fredrik Flo
- Date of birth: 10 October 1996 (age 30)
- Place of birth: Århus, Denmark
- Height: 1.91 m (6 ft 3 in)
- Position: Forward

Team information
- Current team: Skeid
- Number: 3

Senior career*
| Years | Team | Apps | (Gls) |
| 2015–2018 | Sogndal | 5 | (0) |
| 2016 | → Fana (loan) | 11 | (5) |
| 2017 | → Bryne (loan) | 9 | (0) |
| 2018 | → Fana (loan) | 24 | (5) |
| 2019–2020 | Sotra | 22 | (3) |
| 2020–2022 | Øygarden | 61 | (0) |
| 2022 | Sandefjord | 8 | (1) |
| 2023– | Skeid | 64 | (3) |
- * Club domestic league appearances and goals as of 9 November 2025

Fredrik Flo (born 10 October 1996) is a Danish footballer who plays for Skeid.

== Career ==
In the second half of 2016 he was loaned out to Fana. He is the son of Håvard Flo.

He was loaned out to Bryne in 2017 and Fana again in 2018. In 2019 he transferred to Sotra. In 2020 he transferred to Øygarden.

== Personal life ==
He is the son of former Werder Bremen and Wolverhampton Wanderers striker Håvard Flo.

== Career statistics ==
=== Club ===
As of match played 8 November 2025

Appearances and goals by club, season and competition
| Club | Season | League | | | National Cup | | Continental | | Total | |
| Club | Season | Division | Apps | Goals | Apps | Goals | Apps | Goals | Apps | Goals |
|---|---|---|---|---|---|---|---|---|---|---|
| Sogndal | 2015 | OBOS-ligaen | 2 | 0 | 1 | 1 | - | | 3 | 1 |
| Sogndal | 2016 | Tippeligaen | 1 | 0 | 2 | 2 | - | | 3 | 2 |
| Sogndal | 2017 | Eliteserien | 2 | 0 | 1 | 0 | - | | 3 | 0 |
| Sogndal | Total | | 5 | 0 | 4 | 3 | - | - | 9 | 3 |
| Fana (loan) | 2016 | PostNord-ligaen | 11 | 5 | 0 | 0 | - | | 11 | 5 |
| Fana (loan) | 2018 | Norsk Tipping-ligaen | 24 | 5 | 1 | 0 | - | | 25 | 5 |
| Fana (loan) | Total | | 35 | 10 | 1 | 0 | - | - | 36 | 10 |
| Bryne (loan) | 2017 | PostNord-ligaen | 9 | 0 | 0 | 0 | - | | 9 | 0 |
| Bryne (loan) | Total | | 9 | 0 | 0 | 0 | - | - | 9 | 0 |
| Sotra | 2019 | PostNord-ligaen | 22 | 3 | 2 | 0 | - | | 24 | 3 |
| Sotra | Total | | 22 | 3 | 2 | 0 | - | - | 24 | 3 |
| Øygarden | 2020 | OBOS-ligaen | 28 | 0 | 0 | 0 | - | | 28 | 0 |
| Øygarden | 2021 | PostNord-ligaen | 25 | 0 | 3 | 0 | - | | 28 | 0 |
| Øygarden | 2022 | PostNord-ligaen | 8 | 0 | 0 | 0 | - | | 8 | 0 |
| Øygarden | Total | | 61 | 0 | 3 | 0 | - | - | 64 | 0 |
| Sandefjord | 2022 | Eliteserien | 8 | 1 | 2 | 0 | - | | 10 | 1 |
| Sandefjord | Total | | 8 | 1 | 2 | 0 | - | - | 10 | 1 |
| Skeid | 2023 | OBOS-ligaen | 26 | 0 | 2 | 0 | - | | 28 | 0 |
| Skeid | 2024 | PostNord-ligaen | 13 | 2 | 1 | 0 | - | | 14 | 2 |
| Skeid | 2025 | OBOS-ligaen | 25 | 1 | 3 | 0 | - | | 28 | 1 |
| Skeid | Total | | 64 | 3 | 6 | 0 | - | - | 70 | 3 |
| Career total | | | 204 | 17 | 18 | 3 | - | - | 222 | 20 |
