= Stefan Hagerup =

Norwegian footballer (born 1994)

Personal information
- Date of birth: 6 April 1994 (age 32)
- Place of birth: Bergen, Norway
- Height: 1.90 m (6 ft 3 in)
- Position: Goalkeeper

Team information
- Current team: Lillestrøm
- Number: 1

Youth career
- Løv-Ham
- –2013: Fyllingsdalen

Senior career*
Years	Team	Apps	(Gls)
2013–2015	Fyllingsdalen	31	(0)
2015–2016	Sogndal	12	(0)
2016	→ Ull/Kisa (loan)	9	(0)
2017–2023	Ull/Kisa	202	(5)
2024–	Lillestrøm	7	(0)
2024–	Lillestrøm II	11	(0)
- * Club domestic league appearances and goals as of 23 July 2026

Stefan Hagerup (born 6 April 1994) is a Norwegian footballer who plays as a goalkeeper for Lillestrøm SK. He is best known from his period in Ull/Kisa, where he played every single minute from 2017 through 2023 and scored 5 league goals.

== Career ==
Hagerup hails from Sandsli in Bergen. He played youth football for Løv-Ham, being an outfield player until age 13–14, and continued after Løv-Ham was merged with Fyllingen to form FK Fyllingsdalen. Hagerup made his senior debut for Fyllingsdalen in 2013 and established himself as the first choice in the 2014 2. divisjon. Besides football, he worked in the mail service.

In May 2015, the second-tier club Sogndal IL found themselves without a goalkeeper, as Mathias Dyngeland was injured and Christian Sukke was ill. Sogndal gained permission to sign a goalkeeper outside of the transfer window, and found Hagerup via a former assistant coach who now had a role in Fyllingsdalen. Hagerup played 12 matches, helping Sogndal win the 2015 1. divisjon and promotion to the 2016 Eliteserien. Hagerup never played in the Eliteserien, and was instead loaned out to second-tier club Ull/Kisa between May and July 2016. After the 2017 season was over, Hagerup and Ull/Kisa agreed to a permanent move, initially on a contract spanning two years.

In 2017, 2018, 2019, 2020, 2021, 2022 and 2023, Stefan Hagerup played every single minute for Ull/Kisa in the league. The team reached the Eliteserien playoffs twice, but was relegated from the second to the third tier in 2021. However, he arguably became more known for something other than goalkeeping.

Ahead of the 2019 season, it was reported from Ull/Kisa's pre-season camp that Stefan Hagerup would be Ull/Kisa's free kick taker. A journalist compared his technique to that of Didier Drogba and David Luiz.

Hagerup scored his first goal in a training match against Elverum, before his first official goal came in October 2019 against Skeid. In addition to being decisive for Ull/Kisa's 2–1 away win, the technique was described as staggering. Videos of the goal were posted by social media accounts and online newspapers all over Europe, North and South America, gaining millions of views. Another goal came in July 2020, saving one point against Jerv.

In June 2022, he scored twice, first in a 4–3 victory against Asker and a 3–2 victory against Brattvåg. Romerikes Blad described the latter as particularly spectacular, "in headwind, from nearly 30 meters"; being "so fierce that the utmost fierce descriptions had to be dragged out". The same newspaper wrote that his next goal, in 2023, rivalled the others, "a study in perfectioned free kick technique".

In late 2023, his contract with Ull/Kisa ended, and Hagerup wanted to try something new. He trained with Eliteserien club Lillestrøm SK in November 2023, and was offered a contract—as backup for Mads Hedenstad Christiansen and to allow the younger goalkeepers to move out on loan. Said Hagerup; "I am aware that I might play zero Eliteserien games as long as I am with LSK, but I am ready to do my best and will contribute positively". In August 2024, Hedenstad Christiansen picked up an injury and was ruled out for an indeterminate time. Hagerup would make his Eliteserien debut at the age of 30.

== Personal life ==
Hagerup entered a relationship with Rebecca Skaar Danielsen from Loddefjord, and the couple eventually had two children. While they resided at Jessheim, Rebecca's sister eventually moved there as well, and started a relationship with one of Hagerup's teammates.
