= Edin Øy =

Norwegian footballer (born 1997)

Personal information
- Date of birth: 20 May 1997 (age 29)
- Place of birth: Øvre Årdal, Norway
- Height: 1.84 m (6 ft 0 in)
- Position: Midfielder

Team information
- Current team: Ullensaker/Kisa
- Number: 23

Youth career
- Årdal

Senior career*
Years	Team	Apps	(Gls)
2015–2018	Sogndal	5	(0)
2016	→ Førde (loan)	10	(1)
2017	→ Fana (loan)	11	(0)
2018–2019	Ljungskile	26	(6)
2020–	Ullensaker/Kisa	24	(0)
- * Club domestic league appearances and goals as of 20:41, 10 January 2022 (UTC)

Edin Øy (born 20 May 1997) is a Norwegian footballer who plays for Ullensaker/Kisa.
