= Simen Brekkhus =

Norwegian football midfielder (born 1997)

Personal information
- Date of birth: 6 May 1997 (age 29)
- Place of birth: Voss Municipality, Norway
- Position: Midfielder

Team information
- Current team: Fana
- Number: 7

Youth career
- Bulken
- Ørnar

Senior career*
Years	Team	Apps	(Gls)
2012–2014	Voss		
2015–2017	Sogndal	18	(0)
2016	→ Florø (loan)	13	(1)
2017	→ Åsane (loan)	14	(0)
2018–	Fana	51	(12)
- * Club domestic league appearances and goals as of 23 January 2020

Simen Brekkhus (born 6 May 1997) is a Norwegian football midfielder who currently plays for 3. divisjon side Fana.

He started his youth career in local clubs in his native Voss Municipality. In the summer of 2014 he moved to Sogndalsfjøra, and played for Sogndal Fotball's C team, soon the B team. He was drafted into the first-team squad, and made his debut in the first round of the 2015 Norwegian Football Cup. He made his Norwegian Premier League debut in March 2016 against Bodø/Glimt, starting the game. Ahead of the 2018 season he joined 3. divisjon side Fana.
