= Tarjei Aase Omenås =

Norwegian footballer (born 1992)

Tarjei Omenås
Personal information
- Full name: Tarjei Gjendemsjø Omenås
- Birth name: Tarjei Aase Omenås
- Date of birth: 2 February 1992 (age 34)
- Place of birth: Ålesund, Norway
- Position: Goalkeeper

Senior career*
Years	Team	Apps	(Gls)
2009–2010	Lyn	3	(0)
2011–2013	Skeid	4	(0)
2014–2015	Lyn	16	(0)
2015	Hønefoss	18	(0)
2016	Strømmen	24	(0)
2017	Sogndal	0	(0)
2018–2019	Aalesund	2	(0)
- * Club domestic league appearances and goals as of 13 December 2019

Tarjei Gjendemsjø Omenås (born 2 February 1992) is a Norwegian football goalkeeper who last played for Aalesund.

He hails from Ålesund, but joined Lyn as a junior.

He became sales and sponsor partner director of Aalesunds FK, before being promoted to acting managing director on 1 May 2024.
