= Lars Christian Kjemhus =

Norwegian footballer (born 1994)

Personal information
- Full name: Lars Christian Eikhaug Kjemhus
- Date of birth: 3 March 1994 (age 32)
- Place of birth: Bergen, Norway
- Height: 1.80 m (5 ft 11 in)
- Position: Left midfielder

Team information
- Current team: NHH

Youth career
- Bønes
- –2013: Brann

Senior career*
Years	Team	Apps	(Gls)
2013–2014	Fana	31	(7)
2015–2018	Sogndal	77	(5)
2019	Nest-Sotra	0	(0)
2019–	NHH		
- * Club domestic league appearances and goals as of 29 March 2019

Lars Christian Kjemhus (born 3 March 1994) is a Norwegian football midfielder who currently plays for 4. divisjon side NHH FK.

== Career ==
Kjemhus started his career in minnows Bønes IL before joining the ranks of SK Brann. After a successful time with their junior team, Kjemhus started his senior career in Fana IL in 2014. After one season there he signed with Sogndal. He made his Norwegian Premier League debut in March 2016 against Bodø/Glimt.

February 5, 2019, Kjemhus signed for Nest-Sotra. However, after not playing once, he featured for the Norwegian School of Economics students' team NHH FK in the autumn of 2019.

== Career statistics ==
As of 10 November 2018

Season	Club	Division	League		Cup		Total	
Season	Club	Division	Apps	Goals	Apps	Goals	Apps	Goals
2015	Sogndal	OBOS-ligaen	20	2	3	2	23	4
2016	Sogndal	Tippeligaen	24	2	3	0	27	2
2017	Sogndal	Eliteserien	13	0	2	2	15	2
2018	Sogndal	OBOS-ligaen	18	1	2	0	20	1
Career Total			75	5	10	4	85	9
