= Hannu Patronen =

Finnish footballer (born 1984)

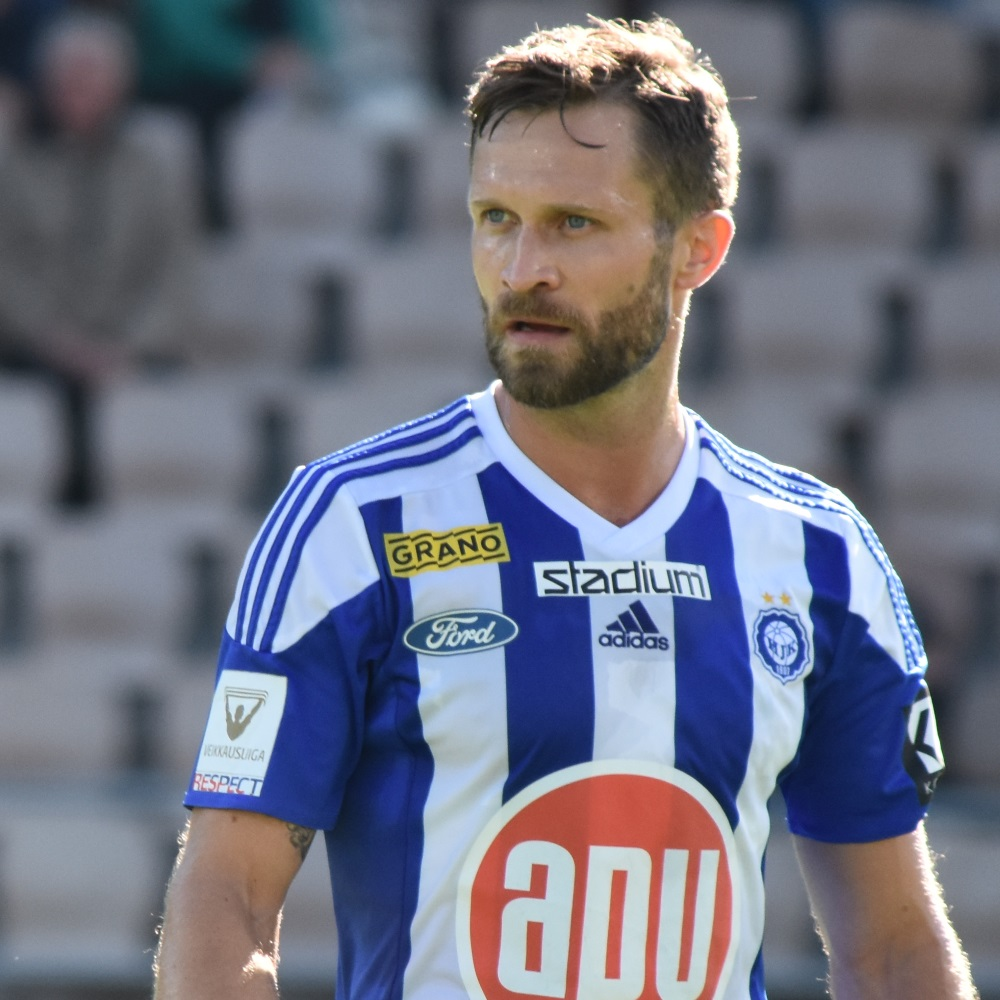
- Patronen with HJK in 2018.

Personal information
- Full name: Hannu Jarl Johannes Patronen
- Date of birth: 23 May 1984 (age 42)
- Place of birth: Järvenpää, Finland
- Height: 1.83 m (6 ft 0 in)
- Position: Centre back

Youth career
- Honka

Senior career*
Years	Team	Apps	(Gls)
2002–2008	Honka	101	(7)
2008–2011	Helsingborg	46	(2)
2012–2016	Sogndal	121	(8)
2017–2018	HJK	35	(4)
2019–2021	HIFK	40	(1)

International career
2011–2016	Finland	6	(0)

Managerial career
- 2021–: VJS (assistant)
- Finland U19 (assistant)
- * Club domestic league appearances and goals

Hannu Patronen (born 23 May 1984) is a Finnish football coach and a former footballer who played as a centre back. He has previously played as a defensive midfielder, and spent time with the Finnish side FC Honka, Swedish side Helsingborgs IF and Norwegian side Sogndal Fotball. Patronen has been capped at international level for Finland.

== Career ==
He made 47 caps for his Finnish club side FC Honka before agreeing on a move to Allsvenskan outfit Helsingborgs IF on 12 July 2008. Patronen signed a 3,5 years long contract with the Swedes for a transfer fee of €322,500. Patronen made his debut with Helsingborg on 15 July 2008 at home against AIK and played for 90 minutes, when his new club won 2–1.

After playing 44 matches and scoring two goals in Allsvenskan with Helsingborg, Patronen was signed on a two-year contract by the Norwegian Tippeligaen side Sogndal ahead of the 2012 season as the replacement for Even Hovland, who had transferred to the reigning Tippeligaen champions Molde. Patronen soon became an integral part of Sogndal's central defence, and he played 54 matches and scored two goals in Tippeligaen during his two first seasons with the club. After his two-year contract expired he signed a one-year extension with Sogndal, which kept him to the club to the end of the 2014 season.

Patronen signed for Helsinki IFK 27 December 2018.

== Career statistics ==
Club	Season	Division	League		Cup		Europe		Total	
Club	Season	Division	Apps	Goals	Apps	Goals	Apps	Goals	Apps	Goals
Honka	2002	Ykkönen	5	0	0	0	–		5	0
Honka	2003	Ykkönen	11	0	0	0	–		11	0
Honka	2004	Ykkönen	16	5	0	0	–		16	5
Honka	2005	Ykkönen	22	0	0	0	–		22	0
Honka	2006	Veikkausliiga	21	0	0	0	–		21	0
Honka	2007	Veikkausliiga	16	2	0	0	3 (Note: Includes UEFA Intertoto Cup)	0	19	2
Honka	2008	Veikkausliiga	10	0	–		–		10	0
Honka	Total		101	7	0	0	3	0	170	10
Helsingborg	2008	Allsvenskan	17	1	2	0	–		19	1
Helsingborg	2009	Allsvenskan	12	0	0	0	2 (Note: Includes UEFA Europa League)	0	14	0
Helsingborg	2010	Allsvenskan	11	0	1	0	–		12	0
Helsingborg	2011	Allsvenskan	6	1	1	0	1	0	8	1
Helsingborg	Total		46	2	4	0	3	0	53	2
Sogndal	2012	Tippeligaen	28	2	0	0	–		28	2
Sogndal	2013	Tippeligaen	24	1	4	0	–		28	1
Sogndal	2014	Tippeligaen	22	0	2	0	–		24	0
Sogndal	2015	1. divisjon	25	4	0	0	–		25	4
Sogndal	2016	Tippeligaen	22	1	1	0	–		23	1
Sogndal	Total		121	8	5	0	0	0	126	8
HJK Helsinki	2017	Veikkausliiga	15	3	4	0	3	0	22	3
HJK Helsinki	2018	Veikkausliiga	20	1	2	1	5 (Note: Includes UEFA Champions League and UEFA Europa League)	0	27	2
HJK Helsinki	Total		35	4	6	1	8	0	49	5
HIFK	2019	Veikkausliiga	22	0	1	0	–		23	0
HIFK	2020	Veikkausliiga	17	1	3	0	–		20	1
HIFK	2021	Veikkausliiga	1	0	2	0	–		3	0
HIFK	Total		40	1	6	0	–	–	46	1
Career Total			167	10	23	1	6	0	196	11

== Honours ==
Individual

- Veikkausliiga Team of the Year: 2017
