= Gilbert Koomson =

Ghanaian footballer

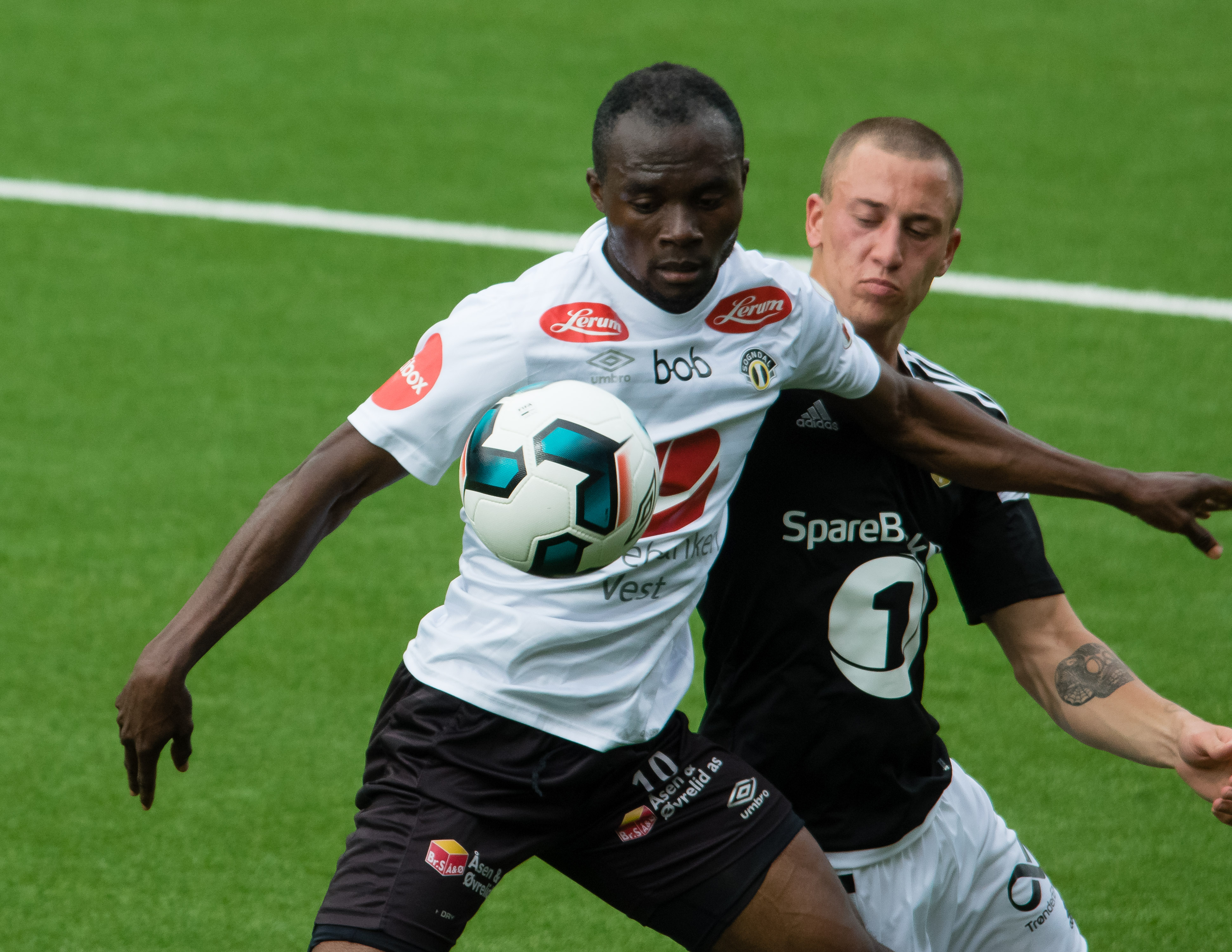
- Koomson in 2017

Personal information
- Date of birth: 9 September 1994 (age 32)
- Place of birth: Accra, Ghana
- Height: 1.80 m (5 ft 11 in)
- Positions: Forward; winger

Team information
- Current team: Duhok

Youth career
- 2008–2010: Ajax Accra FC
- 2011: BEC Tero Sasana

Senior career*
| Years | Team | Apps | (Gls) |
| 2012–2015 | BEC Tero Sasana | 46 | (7) |
| 2013 | → Samut Songkhram (loan) | 12 | (6) |
| 2013 | → Sogndal (loan) | 7 | (0) |
| 2016–2017 | Sogndal | 56 | (10) |
| 2018–2020 | Brann | 72 | (11) |
| 2020–2021 | Kasımpaşa | 22 | (0) |
| 2021–2023 | Bodø/Glimt | 20 | (1) |
| 2022 | → Aalesund (loan) | 10 | (1) |
| 2023 | Sandefjord | 25 | (1) |
| 2024 | Hapoel Petah Tikva | 7 | (0) |
| 2024–2025 | Duhok | 10 | (1) |

International career^{‡}
| 2009–2010 | Ghana U16 | 7 | (2) |
| 2011 | Ghana U17 | 3 | (0) |
| 2015 | Ghana U23 | | |
| 2016 | Ghana | 1 | (0) |
- * Club domestic league appearances and goals as of 1 June 2024 ‡ National team caps and goals as of 6 June 2015

Gilbert Koomson (born 9 September 1994) is a Ghanaian professional footballer who plays as a forward or winger for Iraq stars league team Duhok SC.

== Club career ==
Koomson was born in Accra, Ghana. He played for BEC Tero Sasana in the Thai FA Youth Cup and also being call to Ghana national under-17 team.

Previously, he spent time in the Ajax Accra F.C. in Ghana. Stoke City called him to go on trial but he had a problem with a visa and thus was unable to earn a work permit. He came to Thailand to improve his career of professional footballer under the guidance and recommendation from BEC Tero Sasana Technical Director Peter Butler, (Ex West Ham United) who was coaching Koomson while he was guest coaching at the Manchester City academy in Accra Ghana.

Koomson went to European football when signing for Sogndal in Norway. After two seasons at Sogndal, Koomson signed for Brann ahead of the 2018 season.

== International career ==
Koomson was called up to the senior Ghana side for a 2018 World Cup qualifier against Uganda in October 2016. In 2016, Koomson debuted for Ghana against South Africa.

== Career statistics ==
As of match played 13 November 2022

Appearances and goals by club, season and competition
| Club | Season | League | | | National Cup | | Continental | | Total | |
| Club | Season | Division | Apps | Goals | Apps | Goals | Apps | Goals | Apps | Goals |
|---|---|---|---|---|---|---|---|---|---|---|
| Samutsongkhram (loan) | 2013 | Thai League 1 | 12 | 6 | 0 | 0 | — | | 12 | 6 |
| Sogndal (loan) | 2013 | Eliteserien | 7 | 0 | 0 | 0 | — | | 7 | 0 |
| Police Tero | 2014 | Thai League 1 | 26 | 6 | 0 | 0 | — | | 26 | 6 |
| Police Tero | 2015 | Thai League 1 | 20 | 1 | 0 | 0 | — | | 20 | 1 |
| Police Tero | Total | | 46 | 7 | 0 | 0 | — | | 46 | 7 |
| Sogndal | 2016 | Eliteserien | 28 | 3 | 3 | 0 | — | | 31 | 3 |
| Sogndal | 2017 | Eliteserien | 28 | 7 | 3 | 1 | — | | 31 | 8 |
| Sogndal | Total | | 56 | 10 | 6 | 1 | — | | 62 | 11 |
| Brann | 2018 | Eliteserien | 30 | 1 | 2 | 0 | — | | 32 | 1 |
| Brann | 2019 | Eliteserien | 25 | 2 | 2 | 0 | 2 | 0 | 29 | 2 |
| Brann | 2020 | Eliteserien | 17 | 8 | 0 | 0 | — | | 17 | 8 |
| Brann | Total | | 72 | 11 | 4 | 0 | 2 | 0 | 78 | 11 |
| Kasımpaşa | 2020–21 | Süper Lig | 22 | 0 | 1 | 0 | — | | 23 | 0 |
| Bodø/Glimt | 2021 | Eliteserien | 6 | 1 | 1 | 0 | 2 | 0 | 9 | 1 |
| Bodø/Glimt | 2022 | Eliteserien | 14 | 0 | 5 | 3 | 13 | 0 | 32 | 3 |
| Bodø/Glimt | Total | | 20 | 1 | 6 | 3 | 15 | 0 | 41 | 4 |
| Sandefjord (loan) | 2023 | Eliteserien | 25 | 1 | 2 | 0 | 0 | 0 | 27 | 1 |
| Sandefjord (loan) | Total | | 25 | 1 | 2 | 0 | 0 | 0 | 27 | 1 |
| Hapoel Petah Tikva | 2023–24 | Israeli Premier League | 7 | 0 | 2 | 0 | 0 | 0 | 9 | 0 |
| Hapoel Petah Tikva | Total | | 7 | 0 | 2 | 0 | 0 | 0 | 9 | 0 |
| Duhok | 2024–25 | Iraq Stars League | 0 | 0 | 0 | 0 | 0 | 0 | 0 | 0 |
| Duhok | Total | | 0 | 0 | 0 | 0 | 0 | 0 | 0 | 0 |
| Career total | | | 278 | 37 | 21 | 3 | 17 | 0 | 316 | 39 |

== Honours ==
Bodø/Glimt

- Eliteserien: 2021

=== Individual ===
- Eliteserien Top assist provider: 2016
