= Eirik Birkelund =

Norwegian footballer (born 1994)

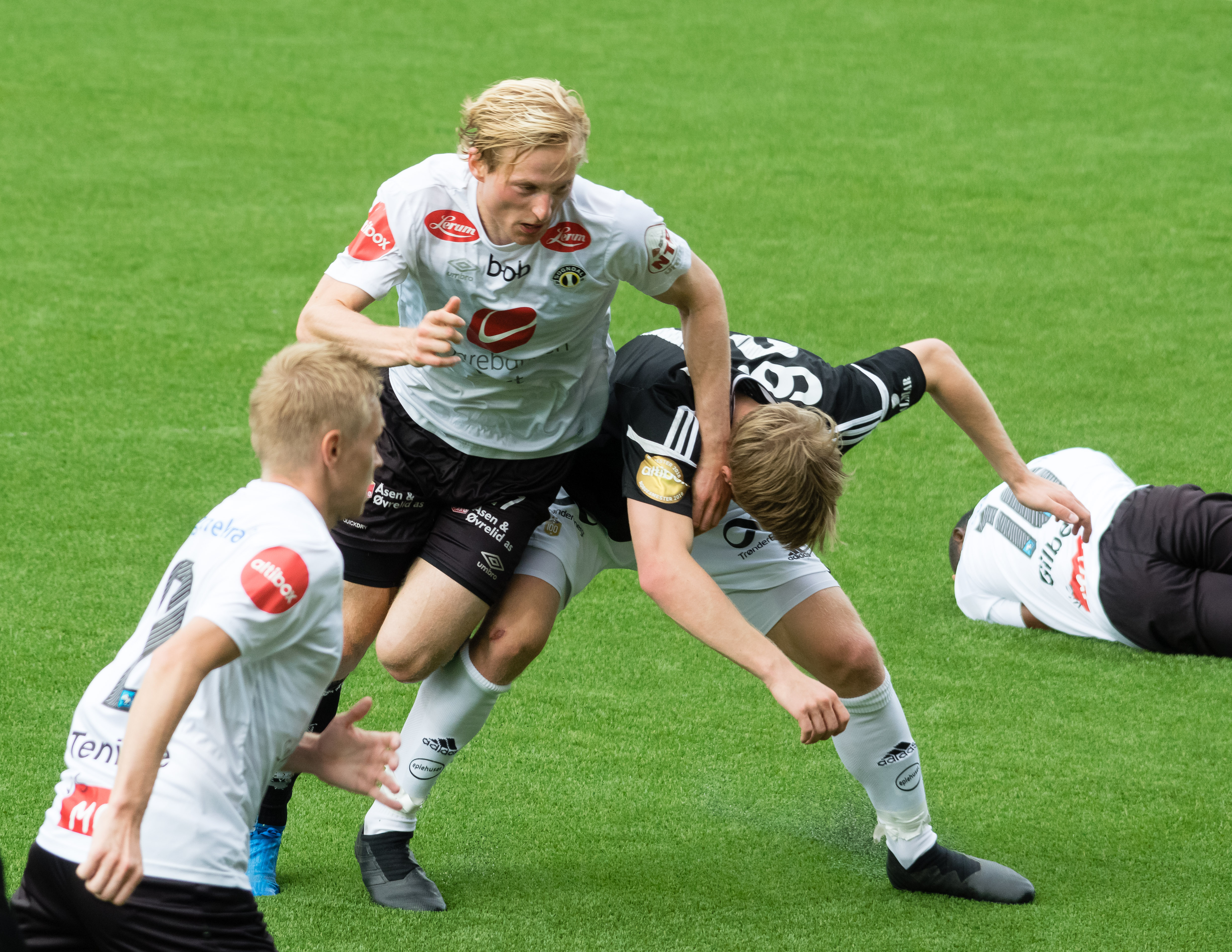
- Eirik Birkelund in 2017.

Personal information
- Full name: Eirik Birkelund
- Date of birth: 13 January 1994 (age 32)
- Place of birth: Bergen, Norway
- Height: 1.80 m (5 ft 11 in)
- Position: Central midfielder

Youth career
- Trane
- –2012: Brann
- 2013–: Saint-Étienne

Senior career*
Years	Team	Apps	(Gls)
2010–2013	Brann	4	(0)
2013–2014	Saint-Étienne	0	(0)
2013–2014	Saint-Étienne II	23	(0)
2014–2016	Brann	14	(0)
2016–2019	Sogndal	91	(3)

International career
	Norway U17	5	(0)
	Norway U19	8	(2)
- * Club domestic league appearances and goals as of 2 August 2019

Eirik Birkelund (born 13 January 1994) is a former Norwegian footballer.

== Career ==
=== Club ===
Throughout 2012 he played for SK Brann, which he had joined at youth level from SK Trane. He was selected for his senior debut in the Norwegian Premier League on 10 June 2011 as a substitute against Sogndal. In 2012, he played three league matches and one cup match.

In June 2014, Birkelund re-signed for SK Brann on an 18-month contract.

In the summer of 2019 Birkelund decide to quit football to and begin on a medicine study.

== Career statistics ==
=== Club ===
As of 2 August 2019

Season	Club	Division	League		Cup		Total	
Season	Club	Division	Apps	Goals	Apps	Goals	Apps	Goals
2011	Brann	Tippeligaen	1	0	0	0	1	0
2012	Brann	Tippeligaen	3	0	1	0	4	0
2012–13	Saint-Étienne II	CFA	6	0	0	0	6	0
2013–14	Saint-Étienne II	CFA 2	17	0	0	0	17	0
2014	Brann	Tippeligaen	2	0	0	0	2	0
2015	Brann	OBOS-ligaen	12	0	1	0	13	0
2016	Sogndal	Tippeligaen	25	0	2	0	27	0
2017	Sogndal	Eliteserien	28	1	3	0	31	1
2018	Sogndal	OBOS-ligaen	27	2	2	1	29	3
2019	Sogndal	OBOS-ligaen	11	0	0	0	11	0
Career Total			132	3	9	1	141	4
