= Henrik Furebotn =

Norwegian footballer (born 1986)

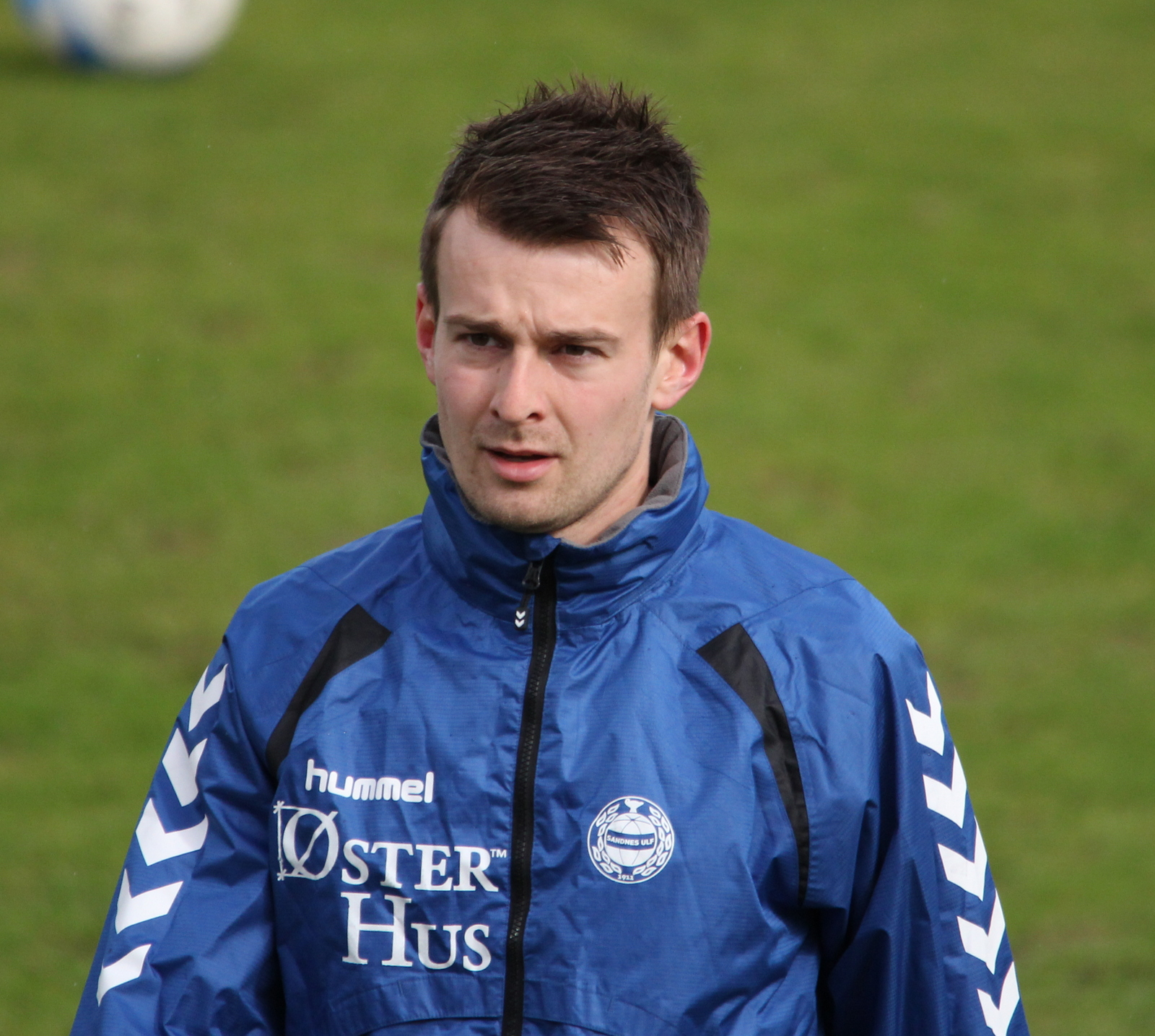

Personal information
- Full name: Henrik Luggenes Furebotn
- Date of birth: 11 February 1986 (age 40)
- Place of birth: Øvre Årdal, Norway
- Height: 1.70 m (5 ft 7 in)
- Position: Midfielder

Team information
- Current team: Årdal

Youth career
- Jotun

Senior career*
Years	Team	Apps	(Gls)
2003–2006	Årdal	64	(14)
2006–2012	Sogndal	173	(16)
2013–2014	Sandnes Ulf	50	(4)
2015–2016	Bodø/Glimt	42	(5)
2016–2018	Sogndal	24	(1)
2017	→ Fredrikstad (loan)	10	(0)
2024–	Årdal	20	(0)

International career
2004	Norway U18	3	(0)
- * Club domestic league appearances and goals

Henrik Furebotn (born 11 February 1986) is a Norwegian former footballer who played as a midfielder.

== Club career ==
He was capped for Norway as a youth international. He signed for Sogndal prior to the 2006 season, having previously played for Årdal in the Second Division. He made his first team debut against Pors in the first round of Adeccoligaen in 2006 on 9 April 2006. His debut in Tippeligaen came on 20 March 2010 against Strømsgodset in the first round of Tippeligaen in 2010. Before the start of the 2015 season, he joined Bodø/Glimt, rejoining Sogndal in 2016. In 2018 Furebotn decided to retire from football.

== Career statistics ==
As of 16 August 2018

Season	Club	Division	League		Cup		Other (Note: Other competitive competitions, including the Norwegian relegation/promotion play-off)		Total	
Season	Club	Division	Apps	Goals	Apps	Goals	Apps	Goals	Apps	Goals
2006	Sogndal	1. divisjon	25	1	4	2	-	-	25	1
2007	Sogndal	1. divisjon	21	2	1	0	-	-	21	2
2008	Sogndal	1. divisjon	21	3	4	0	2	0	21	3
2009	Sogndal	1. divisjon	29	7	4	2	1	0	33	9
2010	Sogndal	1. divisjon	27	2	5	0	-	-	32	2
2011	Sogndal	Tippeligaen	24	0	2	0	-	-	26	0
2012	Sogndal	Tippeligaen	26	1	1	0	-	-	27	1
2013	Sandnes Ulf	Tippeligaen	26	2	2	0	-	-	28	2
2014	Sandnes Ulf	Tippeligaen	24	2	0	0	-	-	24	2
2015	Bodø/Glimt	Tippeligaen	26	3	1	0	-	-	27	3
2016	Bodø/Glimt	Tippeligaen	16	2	3	2	-	-	19	4
2016	Sogndal	Tippeligaen	12	1	-	-	-	-	12	1
2017	Sogndal	Eliteserien	12	0	1	0	-	-	13	0
2017	Fredrikstad	1. divisjon	10	0	0	0	-	-	10	0
2018	Sogndal	1. divisjon	0	0	0	0	-	-	0	0
Career Total			299	26	27	6	4	0	335	32
