= Eirik Bergum Skaasheim =

Norwegian footballer (born 1993)

Eirik Skaasheim
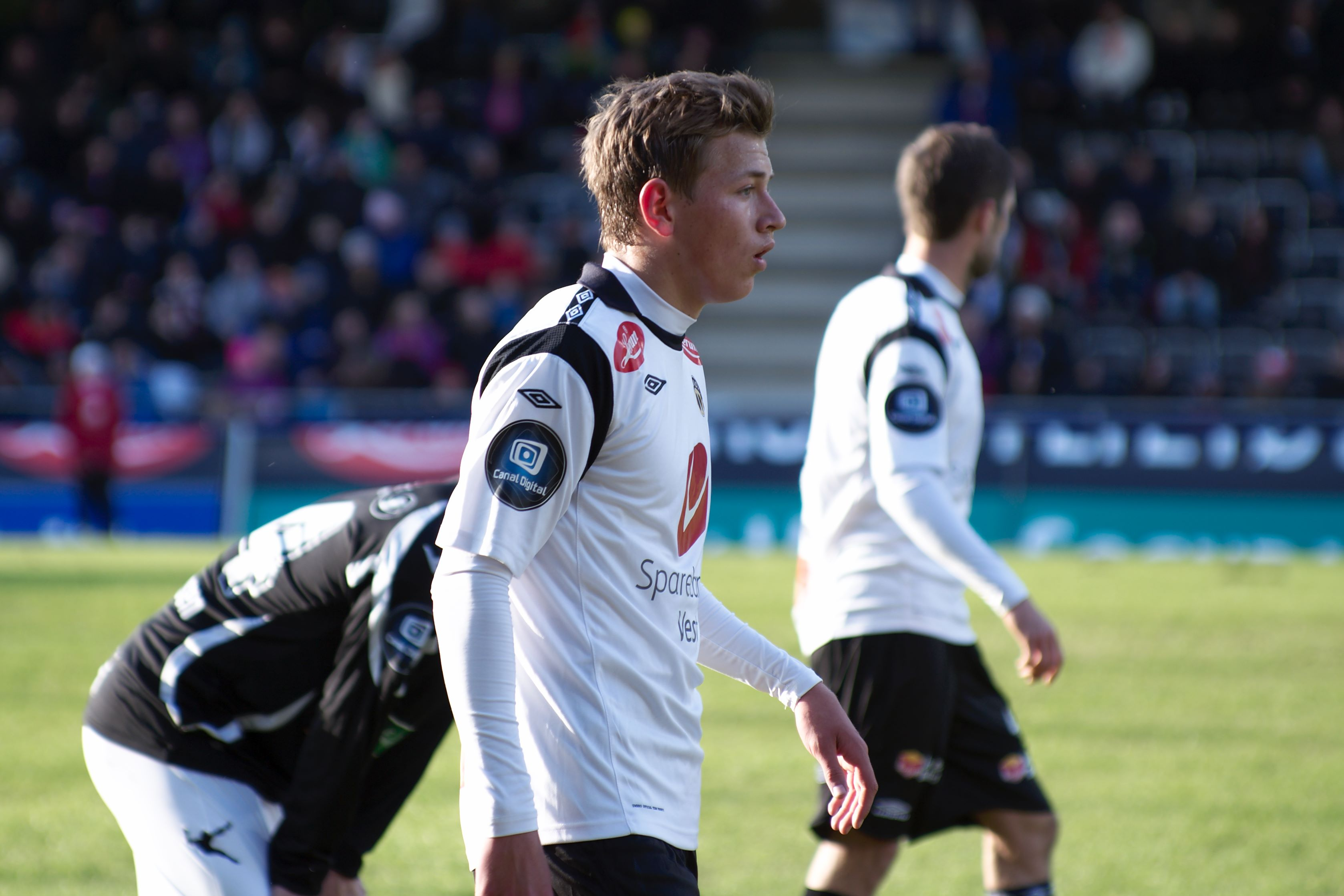

Personal information
- Full name: Eirik Bergum Skaasheim
- Date of birth: 22 January 1993 (age 33)
- Place of birth: Balestrand, Norway
- Height: 1.83 m (6 ft 0 in)
- Position: Defender

Team information
- Current team: NHH

Youth career
- Høyang

Senior career*
Years	Team	Apps	(Gls)
2010–2017	Sogndal	83	(1)
2016	→ Hødd (loan)	15	(0)
2019–	NHH		

International career
2012	Norway U19	2	(0)
2013	Norway U21	5	(0)
- * Club domestic league appearances and goals as of 6 August 2017

Eirik Bergum Skaasheim (born 22 January 1993) is a Norwegian footballer who plays as a defender for NHH FK.

== Career ==
Skaasheim was born in Balestrand Municipality and he started his career with Sogndal Fotball.

Skaasheim joined Sogndal in 2011. He made his debut for Sogndal in a 1–1 draw against Start.

== Career statistics ==
As of 6 August 2017

Season	Club	Division	League		Cup		Total	
Season	Club	Division	Apps	Goals	Apps	Goals	Apps	Goals
2010	Sogndal	Tippeligaen	0	0	1	1	1	1
2011	Sogndal	Tippeligaen	1	0	0	0	1	0
2012	Sogndal	Tippeligaen	25	0	1	0	26	0
2013	Sogndal	Tippeligaen	24	1	2	0	26	1
2014	Sogndal	Tippeligaen	9	0	2	0	11	0
2015	Sogndal	OBOS-ligaen	15	0	1	0	16	0
2016	Sogndal	Tippeligaen	0	0	0	0	0	0
2016	Hødd	OBOS-ligaen	15	0	0	0	15	0
2017	Sogndal	Eliteserien	9	0	2	0	11	0
Career Total			98	1	9	1	107	2
