= Martin Ramsland =

Norwegian footballer (born 1993)

Personal information
- Date of birth: 2 April 1993 (age 33)
- Place of birth: Øyslebø, Norway
- Height: 1.83 m (6 ft 0 in)
- Position: Striker

Team information
- Current team: Arendal
- Number: 8

Youth career
- Marnardal

Senior career*
Years	Team	Apps	(Gls)
2011–2013	MK	36	(18)
2013	→ Strømmen (loan)	13	(3)
2014–2015	Strømmen	36	(12)
2016–2019	Sogndal	63	(15)
2019–2021	Start	59	(15)
2022–2023	Sandnes Ulf	44	(16)
2023–2024	Aalesund	30	(1)
2025–	Arendal	22	(11)
- * Club domestic league appearances and goals as of 3 November 2025

Martin Ramsland (born 2 April 1993) is a Norwegian football striker who currently plays for Eliteserien side Arendal.

He hails from Øyslebø and started his career in local club Marnardal IL. After playing in the Sixth Division he jumped four tiers to play for Mandalskameratene in the Second Division. Discovered by larger clubs, notably Viking and Start, he was signed on loan by Strømmen in 2013, a move that was made permanent. In 2016, he joined Sogndal, who were particularly impressed by Ramsland's stats collected by an analytic tool named ZXY. He made his Norwegian Premier League debut in March 2016 against Bodø/Glimt.

On 12 December 2019, Ramsland got a 5 and a half minute hattrick to turn the score against Lillestrøm from 4-0 to 4-3 to make IK Start promote on away goals to the Eliteserien.

== Career statistics ==
=== Club ===
As of match played 3 December 2023

Appearances and goals by club, season and competition
Club	Season	League			National Cup		Europe		Total	
Club	Season	Division	Apps	Goals	Apps	Goals	Apps	Goals	Apps	Goals
Mandalskameratene	2011	2. divisjon	3	1	0	0	-		3	1
Mandalskameratene	2012	2. divisjon	23	14	1	1	-		24	15
Mandalskameratene	2013	3. divisjon	10	3	0	0	-		10	3
Mandalskameratene	Total		36	18	1	1	-	-	37	19
Strømmen (loan)	2013	Adeccoligaen	13	3	0	0	-		13	3
Strømmen	2014	1. divisjon	7	0	1	0	-		8	0
Strømmen	2015	OBOS-ligaen	29	12	4	3	-		33	15
Strømmen	Total		49	15	5	3	-	-	54	18
Sogndal	2016	Tippeligaen	28	5	2	0	-		30	5
Sogndal	2017	Eliteserien	27	7	1	0	-		28	7
Sogndal	2018	OBOS-ligaen	0	0	0	0	-		0	0
Sogndal	2019	OBOS-ligaen	8	3	2	0	-		10	3
Sogndal	Total		63	15	5	0	-	-	68	12
Start	2019	OBOS-ligaen	12	8	0	0	-		12	8
Start	2020	Eliteserien	17	0	0	0	-		17	0
Start	2021	OBOS-ligaen	30	7	2	0	-		32	7
Start	Total		59	15	2	0	-	-	61	15
Sandnes Ulf	2022	OBOS-ligaen	28	13	1	0	-		29	13
Sandnes Ulf	2023	OBOS-ligaen	16	3	2	2	-		18	5
Sandnes Ulf	Total		44	16	3	2	-	-	47	18
Aalesund	2023	Eliteserien	13	1	0	0	-		13	1
Aalesund	Total		13	1	0	0	-	-	13	1
Career total			264	80	16	6	-	-	280	86
