= Mathias Dyngeland =

Norwegian footballer (born 1995)

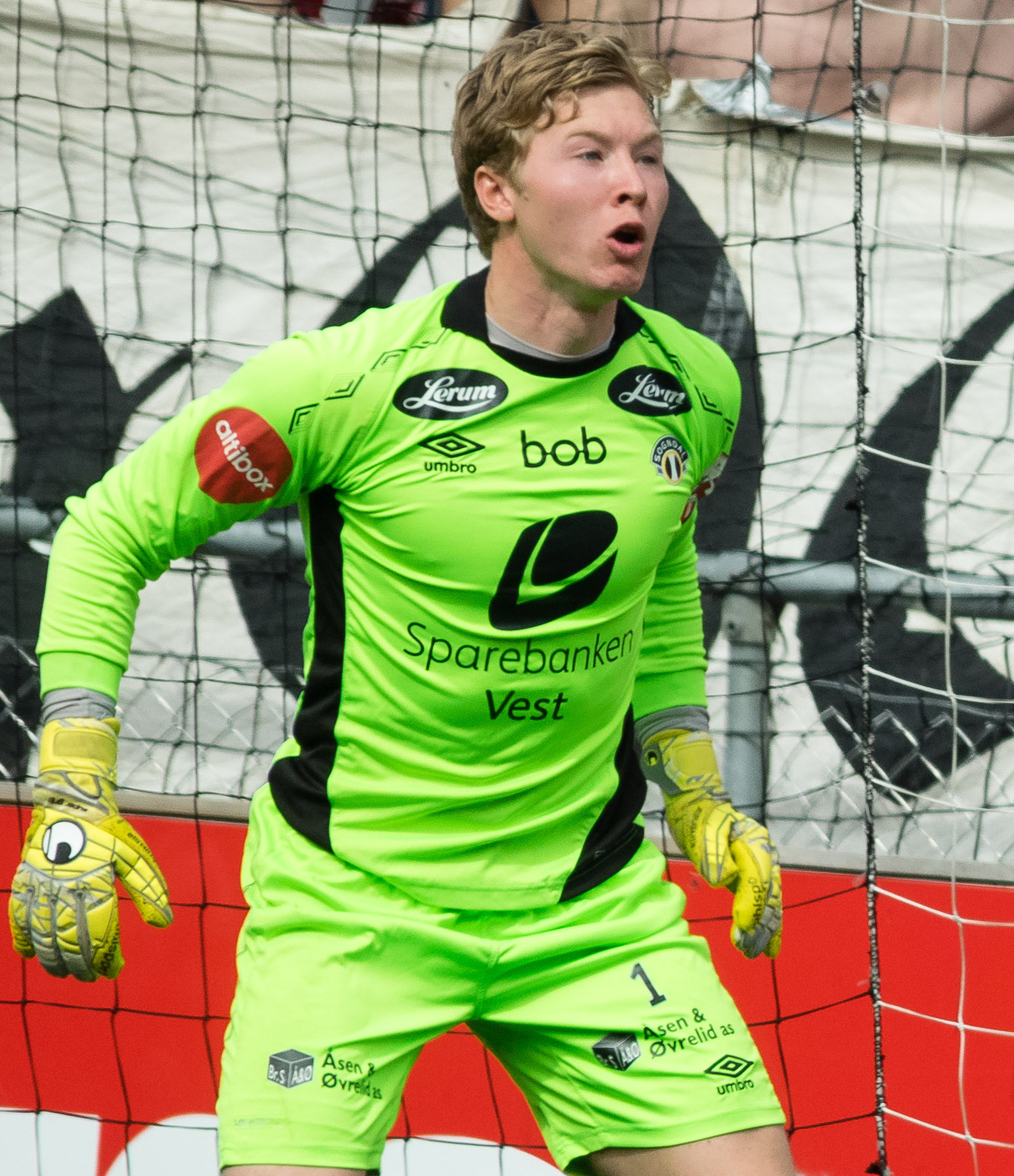
- Mathias Dyngeland in 2017 with Sogndal

Personal information
- Full name: Mathias Lønne Dyngeland
- Date of birth: 7 October 1995 (age 31)
- Place of birth: Fana, Norway
- Height: 1.87 m (6 ft 2 in)
- Position: Goalkeeper

Team information
- Current team: Brann
- Number: 1

Youth career
- –2012: Fana

Senior career*
Years	Team	Apps	(Gls)
2011–2012	Fana	0	(0)
2012–2019	Sogndal	151	(0)
2012	→ Fana (loan)	2	(0)
2020–2022	Elfsborg	1	(0)
2021	→ Vålerenga (loan)	3	(0)
2022–	Brann	132	(0)

International career^{‡}
2012	Norway U17	6	(0)
2013	Norway U18	3	(0)
2014	Norway U19	3	(0)
2014–2016	Norway U21	6	(0)
2023–	Norway	1	(0)
- * Club domestic league appearances and goals as of 13 September 2026 ‡ National team caps and goals as of 16 November 2023

Mathias Lønne Dyngeland (born 7 October 1995) is a Norwegian footballer who plays as a goalkeeper for Brann in Eliteserien and the Norway national team. He has previously played for Fana and Sogndal.

== Club career ==
Dyngeland was born in Fana, and he started his career with local club Fana. He received a lot of attention at the age of 15 after his performance in a 2–3 2011 Norwegian Football Cup loss against his future club Brann.

Dyngeland joined Sogndal in 2012. He made his debut for Sogndal in a 3–0 defeat against Stabæk.

After a spell with Elfsborg, including a loan to Vålerenga, he joined Brann in 2022. He has generally been Brann's main starting goalkeeper since, playing every single minute of their 2022, 2024, and 2025 domestic league campaigns. He suffered a hamstring injury in April 2026, keeping him out for much of the 2026 Eliteserien.

== International career ==
Dyngeland has played for Norway at international youth level, getting his first cap for Norway's under-17 national team on 10 February 2012, in a 2–3 loss to Sweden.

On 30 May 2017, he was called up for the senior team for the first time for the matches against the Czech Republic and Sweden, on 10 and 13 June respectively. He earned his first cap for the team on 16 November 2023, in a 2–0 win against the Faroe Islands.

== Personal life ==
His older brother, who he played together with at Fana and Sogndal, is former footballer Stian Dyngeland. The two have two younger brothers, Sander and Noah, both currently playing at Norwegian Third Division side IL Gneist. All four brothers started out at Fana, with Sander also spending time at Stian's former club Os.

== Career statistics ==
=== Club ===
As of match played 13 September 2026

Appearances and goals by club, season and competition
Club	Season	League			National Cup		Continental		Total	
Club	Season	Division	Apps	Goals	Apps	Goals	Apps	Goals	Apps	Goals
Fana	2011	3. divisjon	0	0	1	0	–		1	0
Fana	Total		0	0	1	0	–		1	0
Fana (loan)	2012	2. divisjon	2	0	2	0	–		4	0
Fana (loan)	Total		2	0	2	0	–		4	0
Sogndal	2013	Tippeligaen	0	0	0	0	–		0	0
Sogndal	2014	Tippeligaen	19	0	3	0	–		22	0
Sogndal	2015	OBOS-ligaen	12	0	0	0	–		12	0
Sogndal	2016	Tippeligaen	30	0	3	0	–		33	0
Sogndal	2017	Eliteserien	30	0	1	0	–		31	0
Sogndal	2018	OBOS-ligaen	30	0	0	0	–		30	0
Sogndal	2019	OBOS-ligaen	30	0	2	0	–		32	0
Sogndal	Total		151	0	9	0	–		160	0
Elfsborg	2020	Allsvenskan	1	0	1	0	–		2	0
Elfsborg	2021	Allsvenskan	0	0	0	0	–		0	0
Elfsborg	Total		1	0	1	0	–		2	0
Vålerenga (loan)	2021	Eliteserien	3	0	1	0	–		4	0
Vålerenga (loan)	Total		3	0	1	0	–		4	0
Brann	2022	OBOS-ligaen	30	0	1	0	–		31	0
Brann	2023	Eliteserien	29	0	7	0	4 (Note: Appearances in UEFA Conference League)	0	40	0
Brann	2024	Eliteserien	30	0	1	0	6	0	37	0
Brann	2025	Eliteserien	30	0	1	0	12 (Note: Two appearances in UEFA Champions League, ten appearances in UEFA Europa League)	0	43	0
Brann	2026	Eliteserien	13	0	3	0	10 (Note: Four appearances in UEFA Europa League, six appearances in UEFA Conference League)	0	25	0
Brann	Total		132	0	11	0	32	0	175	0
Career total			289	0	25	0	32	0	346	0
