= Magnus Pedersen =

Danish footballer (born 1996)

Personal information
- Full name: Magnus Fruergård Pedersen
- Date of birth: 23 November 1996 (age 29)
- Height: 1.88 m (6 ft 2 in)
- Position: Right back

Youth career
- –2009: Assens FC
- 2009–2015: OB

Senior career*
Years	Team	Apps	(Gls)
2015–2016	OB	1	(0)
2016	→ Sogndal (loan)	3	(0)
2016–2018	Sogndal	7	(0)
2017	→ Elverum (loan)	11	(0)
2018–2019	Middelfart	29	(0)
2019	Tarup-Paarup		

International career
2013–2014	Denmark U-18	4	(0)
2014–2015	Denmark U-19	7	(0)
- * Club domestic league appearances and goals as of 16:30, 17 November 2019 (UTC)

Magnus Fruergård Pedersen (born 23 November 1996) is a Danish footballer who plays as a right back.

== Club career ==
=== OB ===
At the age of 18, Pedersen was moved to the first team squad in the summer 2015.

Pedersen got his debut for OB on 16 August 2015. Pedersen started on the bench, but replaced Mohammed Diarra in the 75nd minute in a 2–3 defeat against Randers FC in the Danish Superliga.

==== Loan to Sogndal ====
On 1 April 2016 he signed a loan deal with Tippeligaen-side Sogndal.

=== Sogndal ===
On 6 June 2016 it was confirmed, that Pedersen permanently had signed with Sogndal. After only 4 games from start in 2016, Pedersen was set to leave the club. Pedersen sat on the bench in 16 games without coming on and was not in the squad for five games.

After he came back from Elverum at the end of the 2017 season, Sogndal confirmed on 18 January 2018, that Pedersen had resigned his contract, to move back to Denmark. After leaving Norway, he began training with Danish 1st Division club FC Fredericia.

==== Loan to Elverum ====
On 24 March 2017 he signed a loan deal with Elverum Fotball in OBOS-ligaen stretching to the summer. He was replacing an injured Stian Lund.

=== Middelfart G&BK ===
After a one-week trial at FC Fredericia, Pedersen signed a two-year contract with Danish 2nd Division Middelfart G&BK on 3 February 2018.

=== Tarup-Paarup IF ===
On 26 July 2019, Pedersen moved to Denmark Series club Tarup-Paarup IF.
