= Victor Grodås =

Norwegian footballer (born 1991)

Personal information
- Full name: Victor Eriksson Grodås
- Date of birth: 9 December 1991 (age 34)
- Place of birth: Lillestrøm, Norway
- Position: Defender

Team information
- Current team: Skjetten

Youth career
- –2010: Lillestrøm

Senior career*
| Years | Team | Apps | (Gls) |
| 2011–2014 | Hødd | 53 | (3) |
| 2015–2018 | Sogndal | 42 | (0) |
| 2016 | → Kristiansund (loan) | 10 | (0) |
| 2018–2019 | Strømmen | 40 | (0) |
| 2020–2023 | Kongsvinger | 79 | (4) |
| 2024– | Skjetten SK | 0 | (0) |
- * Club domestic league appearances and goals as of 6 December 2023

Victor Grodås (born 9 December 1991) is a Norwegian footballer who plays for Skjetten.

He is the oldest son of Frode Grodås and his Swedish wife Maria, originally from Charlottenberg.

In December 2023, Grodås announced that he would step down from professional football, and from January 2024 play for Skjetten SK.
