= Fana IL =

Norwegian multi-sport club

Home colours

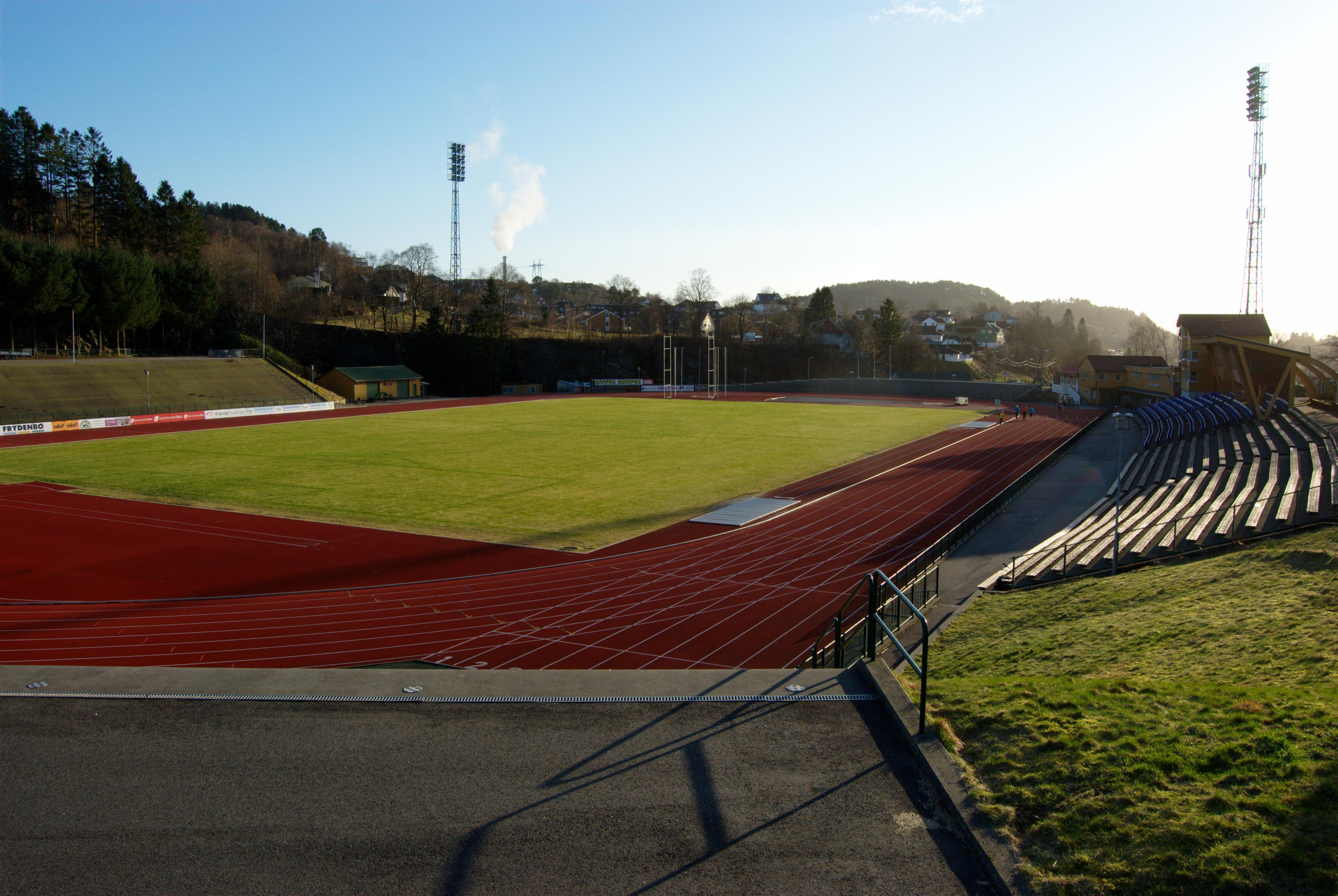
Fana Stadion

Fana Idrettslag is the biggest multi-sport club in Fana, Bergen, Norway. It has several branches, of which football is the largest. Fana IL was founded on 3 March in 1920 at Stend in Bergen.

== The different sports ==
There are a broad scale of activities within the club, and all the following sports have their own sub-group.:

- Alpine skiing
- Track and field
- Handball
- Cross-country skiing / Biathlon
- Orienteering
- Speed skating
- Kickboxing
- Bicycle racing
- Gymnastics
- Rhythmic Gymnastics
- Baton Twirling
- Football

== Football ==
The men's first team plays in the 3. divisjon, the fourth tier in the Norwegian football league system, after being relegated from the 2. divisjon in 2017. The club had a spell in the second tier 1. divisjon in the 1990s.

=== Recent history, men's team ===
Season		Pos.	Pl.	W	D	L	GS	GA	P	Cup	Notes
2001	2. divisjon, section 2	2	26	17	4	5	66	36	55	Second round	
2002	2. divisjon, section 3	5	26	12	4	10	48	46	40	3rd round	
2003	2. divisjon, section 3	11	26	9	3	14	41	51	30	First round	
2004	2. divisjon, section 3	6	26	10	8	8	48	57	38	Second round	
2005	2. divisjon, section 3	10	26	10	3	13	37	50	33	First round	
2006	2. divisjon, section 3	8	26	11	3	12	54	57	36	Second round	
2007	2. divisjon, section 3	9	26	9	8	9	41	46	35	First round	
2008	2. divisjon, section 3	11	26	9	4	13	43	52	31	Second round	
2009	2. divisjon, section 3	11	26	8	4	14	47	66	28	First round	
2010	2. divisjon, section 1	↓ 14	26	3	5	18	27	68	14	Second round	Relegated to 3. divisjon
2011	3. divisjon, section 8	↑ 1	26	18	5	3	79	30	59	Second round	Promoted to 2. divisjon
2012	2. divisjon, section 2	11	26	8	6	12	54	52	30	Second round	
2013	2. divisjon, section 3	8	26	10	5	11	40	47	35	First round	
2014	2. divisjon, section 3	9	26	9	6	11	51	56	33	First round	
2015	2. divisjon, section 3	10	26	7	10	9	42	57	31	Second round	
2016	2. divisjon, section 3	5	26	10	9	7	35	29	39	Second round	
2017	2. divisjon, section 2	↓ 13	26	5	7	14	30	64	22	Second round	Relegated to 3. divisjon
2018	3. divisjon, section 4	7	26	13	1	12	30	64	22	First round	
