= List of Norwegian football transfers summer 2017 =

This is a list of Norwegian football transfers in the 2017 summer transfer window by club. Only clubs of the 2017 Eliteserien and 2017 Norwegian First Division is included.

== Eliteserien ==
=== Brann ===
In:

No.	Pos.	Nation	Player
14	FW	NED	Ludcinio Marengo (from (Netherlands) ADO Den Haag)
26	GK	NOR	Lars Cramer (free agent)

Out:

No.	Pos.	Nation	Player
11	FW	NOR	Steffen Lie Skålevik (on loan to (Norway) Start)
20	MF	NOR	Halldor Stenevik (on loan to (Norway) Nest-Sotra)

=== Haugesund ===
In:

No.	Pos.	Nation	Player
5	DF	CRO	Marko Ćosić (from (Croatia) Inter Zaprešić)
6	MF	POL	Jakub Serafin (on loan from (Poland) Lech Poznań)
55	MF	SRB	Aleksandar Kovačević (from (Poland) Lechia Gdańsk)

Out:

No.	Pos.	Nation	Player
6	MF	SVK	Filip Kiss (to (Saudi Arabia) Al-Ettifaq)
10	FW	NOR	Erik Huseklepp (on loan to (Norway) Åsane)
14	DF	BRA	Bruno Soares (to (Israel) Hapoel Tel Aviv)
20	FW	NOR	Johnny Per Buduson (on loan to (Norway) Fredrikstad)
23	MF	BIH	Haris Hajradinović (to (Croatia) Osijek)

=== Kristiansund ===
In:

No.	Pos.	Nation	Player
7	FW	NOR	Torgil Gjertsen (from (Norway) Ranheim)
12	MF	SEN	Amidou Diop (from (Norway) Molde)
21	MF	NOR	Andreas Rødsand (loan return from (Norway) Nest-Sotra)
22	MF	NOR	Olav Øby (on loan from (Norway) Sarpsborg 08)
36	MF	NOR	Magne Hoseth (free agent)

Out:

No.	Pos.	Nation	Player
4	MF	NGA	Thompson Ekpe (loan return to (Norway) Molde)
7	FW	NOR	Rocky Lekaj (to (Norway) Fredrikstad)
22	MF	NOR	Kamer Qaka (released)

=== Lillestrøm ===
In:

No.	Pos.	Nation	Player
1	GK	CRO	Marko Marić (on loan from (Germany) 1899 Hoffenheim)
7	FW	NGA	Moses Ebiye (from (Nigeria) Akwa United)
8	MF	NGA	Charles Chinedu Ezeh (from (Nigeria) Gee-Lec Football Academy)
10	FW	NGA	Marco Tagbajumi (on loan from (Norway) Strømsgodset)

Out:

No.	Pos.	Nation	Player
1	GK	POR	Daniel Fernandes (released)
7	FW	SVK	Tomáš Malec (loan return to (Austria) LASK Linz)
9	FW	KOS	Bajram Ajeti (to (Sweden) Gefle)
18	MF	NGA	Bonke Innocent (to (Sweden) Malmö FF)
21	FW	NOR	Petter Mathias Olsen (on loan to (Norway) Strømmen)
27	FW	CZE	Michal Škoda (loan return to (Czech Republic) Zbrojovka Brno)
29	GK	NOR	Emil Ødegaard (on loan to (Norway) Levanger)

=== Molde ===
In:

No.	Pos.	Nation	Player
7	MF	NOR	Mathias Normann (on loan from (England) Brighton & Hove Albion)
11	MF	NOR	Martin Ellingsen (from (Norway) Kongsvinger)
13	MF	NGA	Thompson Ekpe (loan return from (Norway) Kristiansund)
26	GK	NOR	Mathias Eriksen Ranmark (from (Norway) Oppsal)
28	FW	SEN	Ibrahima Wadji (from (Turkey) Gaziantep BB)
29	DF	NOR	Vegard Forren (free agent)
32	DF	SWE	Christopher Telo (from (Sweden) Norrköping)
49	MF	NOR	Ola Ormset Husby (loan return from (Norway) Levanger)

Out:

No.	Pos.	Nation	Player
3	DF	NOR	Ole Martin Rindarøy (on loan to (Norway) Sogndal)
11	FW	NOR	Sander Svendsen (to (Sweden) Hammarby)
13	MF	NGA	Thompson Ekpe (to (Norway) Arendal, previously on loan at (Norway) Kristiansund)
16	MF	NOR	Etzaz Hussain (on loan to (Norway) Odd)
18	MF	SEN	Amidou Diop (to (Norway) Kristiansund)
34	GK	BRA	Neydson (on loan to (Norway) Elverum)
29	DF	NOR	Kristian Fredrik Aasen Strande (on loan to (Norway) Brattvåg)
49	MF	NOR	Ola Ormset Husby (on loan to (Norway) Brattvåg, previously on loan at (Norway) Levanger)

=== Odd ===
In:

No.	Pos.	Nation	Player
11	FW	KOS	Elba Rashani (from (Norway) Rosenborg)
20	MF	NOR	Etzaz Hussain (on loan from (Norway) Molde)

Out:

No.	Pos.	Nation	Player
3	MF	KOS	Ardian Gashi (to (Norway) Ørn-Horten)
11	MF	NOR	Rafik Zekhnini (to (Italy) Fiorentina)
20	MF	NOR	Fredrik Oldrup Jensen (to (Belgium) Zulte Waregem)

=== Rosenborg ===
In:

No.	Pos.	Nation	Player
15	MF	NOR	Anders Trondsen (from (Norway) Sarpsborg 08)
17	MF	SWE	Jonathan Levi (from (Sweden) Östers IF)
22	MF	NOR	Morten Konradsen (from (Norway) Bodø/Glimt)
28	FW	NGA	Samuel Adegbenro (from (Norway) Viking)

Out:

No.	Pos.	Nation	Player
15	FW	KOS	Elbasan Rashani (to (Norway) Odd)
17	MF	NOR	John Hou Sæter (to (Norway) Stabæk)
21	MF	NOR	Fredrik Midtsjø (to (Netherlands) AZ)
27	FW	NOR	Mushaga Bakenga (to (Norway) Tromsø)
32	DF	NOR	Erlend Dahl Reitan (on loan to (Norway) Bodø/Glimt)

=== Sandefjord ===
In:

No.	Pos.	Nation	Player
7	FW	URU	Facundo Rodríguez (on loan from (Uruguay) Peñarol)
10	MF	URU	Carlos Grossmüller (on loan from (Peru) Universitario de Deportes)
14	DF	NED	Crescendo van Berkel (from (Netherlands) Telstar)
—	DF	NOR	Varg Støvland (loan return from (Norway) Fram Larvik)

Out:

No.	Pos.	Nation	Player
10	FW	HUN	Péter Kovács (to (Norway) Arendal)
13	FW	NOR	Markus Naglestad (released)
14	DF	ENG	Elliot Kebbie (released)
20	DF	NOR	Kevin Jablinski (on loan to (Norway) Raufoss)

=== Sarpsborg 08 ===
In:

No.	Pos.	Nation	Player
6	MF	DEN	Nicolai Poulsen (on loan from (Denmark) Randers)
24	MF	CPV	Erikson Spinola Lima (from (Norway) KFUM Oslo)
27	FW	FRA	Rashad Muhammed (from (Norway) Florø)
77	MF	ETH	Amin Askar (from (Turkey) Şanlıurfaspor)

Out:

No.	Pos.	Nation	Player
4	DF	NOR	Morten Sundli (to (Sweden) Öster)
6	MF	NOR	Anders Trondsen (to (Norway) Rosenborg)
9	FW	NGA	Kachi (on loan to (Norway) Strømmen, previously on loan at (Norway) Bodø/Glimt)
24	FW	NOR	Amani Mbedule (on loan to (Norway) Notodden, previously on loan at (Norway) Hødd)
44	FW	KOS	Erton Fejzullahu (to (Sweden) Kalmar)
45	FW	NOR	Jørgen Strand Larsen (on loan to (Italy) A.C. Milan Primavera)
—	MF	NOR	Olav Øby (on loan to (Norway) Kristiansund, previously on loan at (Norway) Strømmen)

=== Sogndal ===
In:

No.	Pos.	Nation	Player
14	DF	NOR	Ole Martin Rindarøy (on loan from (Norway) Molde)
16	DF	ENG	Reiss Greenidge (free agent)
20	FW	NOR	Markus Brændsrød (from (Norway) Strømmen)
23	MF	NOR	Edin Øy (loan return from (Norway) Fana)
30	MF	NOR	Joachim Soltvedt (from (Norway) Åsane)
39	MF	GUI	Mohamed Didé Fofana (from (Guinea) Hafia)
40	DF	NOR	Even Hovland (from (Germany) 1. FC Nürnberg)
77	FW	MNE	Staniša Mandić (on loan from (Serbia) Čukarički)

Out:

No.	Pos.	Nation	Player
6	MF	NOR	Henrik Furebotn (on loan to (Norway) Fredrikstad)
8	FW	NOR	Fredrik Flo (on loan to (Norway) Bryne)
16	DF	ETH	Walid Atta (loan return to (Saudi Arabia) Najran)
20	FW	NOR	Kristian Fardal Opseth (to (Norway) Bodø/Glimt, previously on loan)
30	DF	ISL	Kristinn Jónsson (to (Iceland) Breiðablik)
34	MF	NOR	Simen Brekkhus (on loan to (Norway) Åsane)

=== Stabæk ===
In:

No.	Pos.	Nation	Player
2	DF	VEN	Ronald Hernández (from (Venezuela) Zamora FC)
8	MF	NOR	John Hou Sæter (from (Norway) Rosenborg)
20	FW	USA	Rubio Rubin (from (Denmark) Silkeborg)
22	GK	SWE	John Alvbåge (on loan from (Sweden) IFK Göteborg)
60	DF	NOR	Edvard Linnebo Race (loan return from (Norway) Kongsvinger)
77	MF	CHN	Tao Hongliang (from (China) Shandong Luneng Taishan F.C.)

Out:

No.	Pos.	Nation	Player
8	MF	FRA	El Hadji Ba (released)
20	FW	LBR	Alex Nimely (released)
50	FW	NOR	Oskar Johannes Løken (to (Norway) Raufoss)
22	GK	IND	Gurpreet Singh Sandhu (released)

=== Strømsgodset ===
In:

No.	Pos.	Nation	Player
18	DF	NOR	Henrik Bredeli (loan return from (Norway) Strømmen)
20	GK	NOR	Pål Vestly Heigre (from (Norway) Aalesund)

Out:

No.	Pos.	Nation	Player
7	FW	NOR	Tommy Høiland (to (Norway) Viking)
12	GK	POL	Radoslaw Janukiewicz (loan return to (Poland) Pogoń Szczecin)
18	DF	NOR	Henrik Bredeli (on loan to (Norway) Fredrikstad, previously on loan at (Norway) Strømmen)
33	FW	NGA	Marco Tagbajumi (on loan to (Norway) Lillestrøm)
46	DF	NOR	Sondre Solholm Johansen (to (Norway) Mjøndalen, previously on loan)
77	GK	IRN	Sosha Makani (loan return to (Norway) Mjøndalen)

=== Tromsø ===
In:

No.	Pos.	Nation	Player
21	GK	FIN	Otto Fredrikson (from (Norway) Kongsvinger)
25	DF	NOR	Lasse Nilsen (loan return from (Norway) Tromsdalen)
40	GK	ESP	Javier Jiménez Camarero (from (Spain) Huesca)
42	FW	NOR	Mushaga Bakenga (from (Norway) Rosenborg)
88	MF	RUS	Shamil Gasanov (from (Russia) Anzhi Makhachkala)

Out:

No.	Pos.	Nation	Player
16	DF	GHA	Patrick Kpozo (loan return to (Sweden) AIK)
27	MF	NOR	Fredrik Michalsen (on loan to (Iceland) Fjölnir)

=== Viking ===
In:

No.	Pos.	Nation	Player
3	DF	NOR	Andreas Nordvik (from (Denmark) Esbjerg)
4	DF	ESP	José Cruz (from (Spain) Racing Ferrol)
7	FW	ENG	George Green (from (England) Burnley)
8	FW	NGA	Aniekpeno Udoh (loan return from (Norway) Levanger)
8	MF	ENG	Ross Jenkins (from (Bulgaria) Pirin Blagoevgrad)
9	MF	NOR	Fredrik Torsteinbø (from (Sweden) Hammarby)
10	FW	NOR	Tommy Høiland (from (Norway) Strømsgodset)
13	DF	CRO	Šime Gregov (from (Slovenia) Koper)
26	MF	NOR	Tore André Sørås (from (Norway) Follo)
99	FW	CIV	Ghislain Guessan (from (Algeria) RC Arbaâ)

Out:

No.	Pos.	Nation	Player
4	DF	ENG	Michael Ledger (loan return to (England) Sunderland)
6	DF	EST	Karol Mets (to (Netherlands) NAC Breda)
7	FW	NGA	Samuel Adegbenro (to (Norway) Rosenborg)
8	FW	NGA	Aniekpeno Udoh (on loan to (Sweden) Ljungskile, previously on loan at (Norway) Levanger)
9	FW	DEN	Patrick Pedersen (to (Iceland) Valur)
10	FW	GHA	Kwesi Appiah (loan return to (England) Crystal Palace)
21	MF	NOR	Herman Kleppa (on loan to (Norway) Vidar)
23	FW	NIR	Robin Shroot (loan return to (Norway) Hødd)
30	MF	NOR	Stian Michalsen (on loan to (Sweden) Ljungskile)

=== Vålerenga ===
In:

No.	Pos.	Nation	Player
9	FW	NOR	Fitim Azemi (from (Israel) Maccabi Haifa)
33	GK	GHA	Adam Larsen Kwarasey (from (Denmark) Brøndby)

Out:

No.	Pos.	Nation	Player
9	MF	SWE	Rasmus Lindkvist (to (Sweden) AIK)
17	FW	NOR	Muhamed Keita (loan return to (Poland) Lech Poznań)
10	MF	NOR	Ghayas Zahid (to (Cyprus) APOEL)
29	MF	NOR	Magnus Grødem (on loan to (Norway) Ull/Kisa)
30	GK	NOR	Aslak Falch (to (Sweden) Norrköping)
31	DF	NOR	Mathusan Sandrakumar (on loan to (Norway) Strømmen)

=== Aalesund ===
In:

No.	Pos.	Nation	Player
10	FW	GRE	Thanasis Papazoglou (on loan from (Belgium) Kortrijk)
25	GK	NOR	Jan-Lennart Urke (from (Norway) Hødd)

Out:

No.	Pos.	Nation	Player
4	DF	FIN	Tero Mäntylä (released)
10	FW	RSA	Lars Veldwijk (loan return to (Belgium) Kortrijk)
23	GK	NOR	Pål Vestly Heigre (to (Norway) Strømsgodset)

== OBOS-ligaen ==
=== Arendal ===
In:

No.	Pos.	Nation	Player
6	DF	KOS	Avni Pepa (from (Iceland) ÍBV)
17	MF	NGA	Thompson Ekpe (from (Norway) Molde)
18	FW	BRA	Darlan (from (Brazil) Olaria AC)
24	GK	DEN	Marco Priis Jørgensen (on loan from (Norway) Mjøndalen)
39	FW	HUN	Péter Kovács (from (Norway) Sandefjord)

Out:

No.	Pos.	Nation	Player
6	DF	NOR	Sven Fredrik Stray (released)
16	FW	NOR	Ole Marius Håbestad (released)
18	FW	NOR	Steinar Berås (released)
27	FW	NOR	Ken Deeku (released)

=== Bodø/Glimt ===
In:

No.	Pos.	Nation	Player
20	FW	SWE	Amor Layouni (from (Norway) Elverum)
21	DF	NOR	Erlend Dahl Reitan (on loan from (Norway) Rosenborg)
22	FW	NOR	Kristian Fardal Opseth (from (Norway) Sogndal, previously on loan)
—	MF	ISL	Oliver Sigurjónsson (from (Iceland) Breiðablik)

Out:

No.	Pos.	Nation	Player
9	FW	NGA	Kachi (loan return to (Norway) Sarpsborg 08)
11	MF	SRB	Nemanja Mladenović (released)
17	MF	NOR	Mathias Normann (to (England) Brighton & Hove Albion)
19	FW	NOR	Joachim Osvold (to (Norway) Levanger)

=== Elverum ===
In:

No.	Pos.	Nation	Player
2	DF	SRB	Goran Antonic (from (Cyprus) Nea Salamis Famagusta)
11	FW	SWE	Haris Cirak (on loan from (Sweden) AFC Eskilstuna)
20	MF	NOR	Sabri Khattab (from (Canada) FC Edmonton)
29	FW	ZIM	Silas Songani (on loan from (Denmark) SøderjyskE)
30	GK	BRA	Neydson (on loan from (Norway) Molde)
32	FW	SEN	Mouhamadou Moustapha N'Diaye (from (Norway) Fredrikstad)

Out:

No.	Pos.	Nation	Player
4	DF	IRQ	Rebin Sulaka (to (Qatar) Al-Markhiya Sports Club)
19	FW	SWE	Amor Layouni (to (Norway) Bodø/Glimt)
20	MF	SWE	Carlos Gaete Moggia (to (Sweden) Västerås)
22	GK	NOR	Vegar Berntsen (on loan to (Norway) Nybergsund IL-Trysil)
25	FW	NOR	Robin Hjelmeseth (to (Norway) Hødd)

=== Florø ===
In:

No.	Pos.	Nation	Player
12	MF	NOR	Kristoffer Ryland (from Sogndal 2, previously on loan)
19	FW	SEN	Alioune Ndour (from (United Arab Emirates) Al Khaleej)
25	FW	NOR	Peter Aase (from Sogndal, previously on loan)
29	FW	NOR	Torbjørn Aabrekk (from Varegg)

Out:

No.	Pos.	Nation	Player
13	MF	NOR	Truls Hovland (to Årdal)
27	FW	FRA	Rashad Muhammed (to Sarpsborg 08)

=== Fredrikstad ===
In:

No.	Pos.	Nation	Player
11	FW	NOR	Johnny Per Buduson (on loan from (Norway) Haugesund)
14	MF	SWE	Alexander Henningsson (from (Sweden) Halmstad)
17	FW	NOR	Rocky Lekaj (from (Norway) Kristiansund)
19	DF	NOR	Henrik Bredeli (on loan from (Norway) Strømsgodset)
21	MF	NOR	Henrik Furebotn (on loan from (Norway) Sogndal)

Out:

No.	Pos.	Nation	Player
11	DF	NOR	Kristian Brix (to (Norway) Sandnes Ulf)
17	MF	NOR	Mats André Kaland (to (Norway) Ull/Kisa)
19	FW	SEN	Mouhamadou Moustapha N'Diaye (to (Norway) Elverum)
29	DF	ENG	Kevin Wright (to (Sweden) Degerfors)
33	MF	CRO	Dinko Trebotic (released)

=== Jerv ===
In:

No.	Pos.	Nation	Player
6	MF	DEN	Mathias Wichmann (from (Denmark) Viborg)
15	DF	NOR	Halvor Hovstad (promoted from junior squad)
45	FW	GNB	Idelino Colubali (on loan from (Portugal) Boavista)

Out:

No.	Pos.	Nation	Player
18	DF	NOR	Tobias Collett (on loan to Vindbjart)

=== Kongsvinger ===
In:

No.	Pos.	Nation	Player
—	FW	SEN	Mame Niang (from (South Africa) Stellenbosch)
—	MF	POR	Hélio Pinto (from (Greece) Trikala)

Out:

No.	Pos.	Nation	Player
8	MF	NOR	Martin Skjelbreid Ellingsen (to (Norway) Molde)
21	DF	NOR	Edvard Linnebo Race (loan return to (Norway) Stabæk)
22	DF	NOR	Lars Rydje (to (Norway) Skjetten)

=== Levanger ===
In:

No.	Pos.	Nation	Player
11	FW	NOR	Joachim Osvold (from (Norway) Bodø/Glimt)
29	GK	NOR	Emil Ødegaard (on loan from (Norway) Lillestrøm)

Out:

No.	Pos.	Nation	Player
11	FW	NGA	Aniekpeno Udoh (loan return to (Norway) Viking)
12	GK	ENG	Lloyd Saxton (loan return to (Sweden) GIF Sundsvall)
49	MF	NOR	Ola Ormset Husby (loan return to (Norway) Molde)

=== Mjøndalen ===
In:

No.	Pos.	Nation	Player
1	GK	IRN	Sosha Makani (loan return from (Norway) Strømsgodset)
23	DF	NOR	Sondre Solholm Johansen (from (Norway) Strømsgodset, previously on loan)
32	DF	NOR	Vetle Dragsnes (from (Norway) Ull/Kisa)

Out:

No.	Pos.	Nation	Player
3	DF	NOR	Petter Havsgård Martinsen (on loan to (Norway) Nest-Sotra)
6	MF	SWE	Pontus Silfwer (to (Sweden) Halmstad)
10	FW	LTU	Simonas Stankevicius (on loan to (Norway) Egersund)
24	FW	NOR	Thomas Sørum (Retired)
30	GK	DEN	Marco Priis Jørgensen (on loan to (Norway) Arendal)

=== Ranheim ===
In:

No.	Pos.	Nation	Player
—	DF	NOR	Andreas Søfteland (from (Norway) Sverresborg)

Out:

No.	Pos.	Nation	Player
9	FW	NOR	Torgil Gjertsen (to (Norway) Kristiansund)

=== Sandnes Ulf ===
In:

No.	Pos.	Nation	Player
17	FW	NOR	Roger Ekeland (from (Norway) Stord)
22	DF	BIH	Jasmin Bogdanovic (from (Bosnia and Herzegovina) Zrinjski Mostar)
24	DF	NOR	Kristian Brix (from (Norway) Fredrikstad)

Out:

No.	Pos.	Nation	Player
17	MF	NOR	Eirik Larsson (released)
18	FW	NOR	Jon Petter Stangeland (released)
20	MF	NOR	Andreas Dybevik (on loan to (Norway) Bryne)
36	MF	SRB	Bojan Zajić (retired)

=== Start ===
In:

No.	Pos.	Nation	Player
5	MF	NOR	Adnan Hadzic (from (Norway) Ørn-Horten)
11	FW	NOR	Steffen Lie Skålevik (on loan from (Norway) Brann)
22	FW	ISL	Kristján Flóki Finnbogason (from (Iceland) FH)
31	DF	JAM	Damion Lowe (from (United States) Tampa Bay Rowdies)

Out:

No.	Pos.	Nation	Player
5	MF	ENG	Nigel Reo-Coker (released)
91	FW	FRA	Dany N'Guessan (released)

=== Strømmen ===
In:

No.	Pos.	Nation	Player
—	FW	NGA	Kachi (on loan from (Norway) Sarpsborg 08)
—	FW	NOR	Petter Mathias Olsen (on loan from (Norway) Lillestrøm)
—	DF	NOR	Mathusan Sandrakumar (on loan from (Norway) Vålerenga)

Out:

No.	Pos.	Nation	Player
6	DF	NOR	Henrik Bredeli (loan return to (Norway) Strømsgodset)
7	MF	NOR	Olav Øby (loan return to (Norway) Sarpsborg 08)
9	FW	NOR	Markus Brændsrød (to (Norway) Sogndal)

=== Tromsdalen ===
In:

No.	Pos.	Nation	Player
—	FW	NOR	Sebastian Jensen (from (Norway) Senja)
—	DF	NOR	Jo Nymo Matland (from (Belgium) Sporting Hasselt)

Out:

No.	Pos.	Nation	Player
9	FW	NOR	Christer Johnsgård (on loan to (Norway) Senja)
16	DF	NOR	Simon Laugsand (on loan to (Norway) Finnsnes)
17	DF	NOR	Lasse Nilsen (loan return to (Norway) Tromsø)

=== Ull/Kisa ===
In:

No.	Pos.	Nation	Player
15	MF	NOR	Mats André Kaland (from Fredrikstad)
20	MF	NOR	Magnus Grødem (on loan from Vålerenga)
26	DF	NOR	Espen Bjørnsen Garnås (from Kjelsås)

Out:

No.	Pos.	Nation	Player
12	GK	NOR	Fredrik Johansen Mundal (on loan to Skjetten, previously on loan at KFUM Oslo)
20	DF	NOR	Vetle Dragsnes (to Mjøndalen)
23	MF	NOR	Jonas Fjeldberg (to (United States) Dayton Flyers)

=== Åsane ===
In:

No.	Pos.	Nation	Player
6	MF	NOR	Simen Brekkhus (on loan from (Norway) Sogndal)
17	DF	NOR	Nikolai Harris (from (Norway) Fløy)
18	FW	NOR	Erik Huseklepp (on loan from (Norway) Haugesund)

Out:

No.	Pos.	Nation	Player
—	MF	NOR	Joachim Soltvedt (to (Norway) Sogndal)
9	FW	RUS	Vadim Manzon (released)
