= List of Norwegian football transfers winter 2017–18 =

This is a list of Norwegian football transfers in the 2017–18 winter transfer window by club. Only clubs of the 2018 Eliteserien and 2018 OBOS-ligaen are included.

== Eliteserien ==
=== Bodø/Glimt ===
In: Note: Flags indicate national team as defined under FIFA eligibility rules; some limited exceptions apply. Players may hold more than one non-FIFA nationality.

No.	Pos.	Nation	Player
8	DF	NOR	Eirik Wollen Steen (from (Norway) Åsane)
9	FW	NOR	Endre Kupen (from (Norway) Florø)
12	GK	SRB	Zoran Popović (from (Serbia) Voždovac)
17	DF	ESP	José Isidoro (free transfer)
19	MF	DEN	Philip Zinckernagel (from (Denmark) SønderjyskE)
21	FW	NOR	Geir André Herrem (from (Norway) Åsane)

Out: Note: Flags indicate national team as defined under FIFA eligibility rules; some limited exceptions apply. Players may hold more than one non-FIFA nationality.

No.	Pos.	Nation	Player
1	GK	CAN	Simon Thomas (to (Norway) Kongsvinger)
8	DF	NOR	Daniel Edvardsen (to (Norway) Sandnes Ulf)
21	DF	NOR	Erlend Dahl Reitan (loan return to (Norway) Rosenborg)
23	MF	ISL	Oliver Sigurjónsson (on loan to (Iceland) Breiðablik)
28	FW	NOR	William Hanssen (on loan to (Norway) Alta)

=== Brann ===
In: Note: Flags indicate national team as defined under FIFA eligibility rules; some limited exceptions apply. Players may hold more than one non-FIFA nationality.

No.	Pos.	Nation	Player
1	GK	AUT	Samuel Şahin-Radlinger (on loan from (Germany) Hannover 96)
2	DF	EST	Taijo Teniste (from (Norway) Sogndal)
10	MF	BIH	Amer Ordagić (from (Bosnia and Herzegovina) Sloboda Tuzla)
11	FW	NOR	Steffen Lie Skålevik (loan return from (Norway) Start)
22	MF	GHA	Gilbert Koomson (from (Norway) Sogndal)
27	FW	NOR	Henrik Kjelsrud Johansen (from (Norway) Vålerenga)
—	DF	NOR	Emil Kalsaas (from (Norway) Fyllingsdalen)

Out: Note: Flags indicate national team as defined under FIFA eligibility rules; some limited exceptions apply. Players may hold more than one non-FIFA nationality.

No.	Pos.	Nation	Player
1	GK	USA	Alex Horwath (to (United States) Real Salt Lake)
6	DF	ISL	Viðar Ari Jónsson (on loan to (Iceland) FH)
9	MF	NOR	Kasper Skaanes (to (Norway) Start)
10	FW	SWE	Jakob Orlov (to (Sweden) Jönköpings Södra)
20	MF	NOR	Halldor Stenevik (on loan to (Norway) Nest-Sotra)
22	FW	NOR	Torgeir Børven (to (Norway) Odd)
24	GK	POL	Piotr Leciejewski (to (Poland) Zagłębie Lubin)
26	GK	NOR	Lars Cramer (retired)
26	DF	FIN	Dani Hatakka (to (Finland) SJK, previously on loan)
33	DF	NOR	Amin Nouri (to (Norway) Vålerenga)
—	DF	NOR	Viljar Birkeland (to (Norway) Åsane)
—	MF	NOR	Andreas Fantoft (to (Norway) Åsane)

=== Haugesund ===
In: Note: Flags indicate national team as defined under FIFA eligibility rules; some limited exceptions apply. Players may hold more than one non-FIFA nationality.

No.	Pos.	Nation	Player
3	DF	CIV	Benjamin Karamoko (from (France) Saint-Étienne)
6	DF	NOR	Joakim Våge Nilsen (from (Norway) Odd)
7	MF	NOR	Christian Grindheim (from (Norway) Vålerenga)
14	MF	NOR	Torbjørn Kallevåg (from (Norway) Hødd)
20	FW	MLI	Ibrahima Koné (from (Mali) CO de Bamako)
25	MF	CPV	Erin Pinheiro (on loan from (France) Saint-Étienne)
35	MF	NGA	Anthony Ikedi (from (Belgium) Gent, previously on loan)
77	MF	NGA	Babajide David (on loan from (Denmark) Midtjylland)

Out: Note: Flags indicate national team as defined under FIFA eligibility rules; some limited exceptions apply. Players may hold more than one non-FIFA nationality.

No.	Pos.	Nation	Player
6	MF	POL	Jakub Serafin (loan return to (Poland) Lech Poznań)
7	FW	SOM	Liban Abdi (to (Saudi Arabia) Al-Ettifaq)
10	FW	NOR	Erik Huseklepp (to (Norway) Åsane, previously on loan)
11	MF	NOR	Tor Arne Andreassen (retired)
13	MF	NOR	Eirik Mæland (to (Norway) Fredrikstad)
15	MF	NGA	Izuchuckwu Anthony (on loan to (Norway) Jerv)
17	FW	NGA	Shuaibu Ibrahim (on loan to (Norway) Kongsvinger)
20	FW	NOR	Johnny Per Buduson (to (Norway) HamKam, previously on loan at (Norway) Fredrikstad)
26	DF	NOR	Sverre Bjørkkjær (to (Norway) Strømmen)
28	MF	NOR	Arent-Emil Hauge (on loan to (Norway) Vard Haugesund)
29	MF	NOR	Robert Kling (to (Norway) Florø)
—	FW	NOR	Erling Flotve Myklebust (to (Norway) Vard, previously on loan)

=== Kristiansund ===
In: Note: Flags indicate national team as defined under FIFA eligibility rules; some limited exceptions apply. Players may hold more than one non-FIFA nationality.

No.	Pos.	Nation	Player
6	MF	EST	Brent Lepistu (from (Estonia) Flora Tallinn)
12	GK	EST	Andreas Vaikla (from (Finland) IFK Mariehamn)
13	FW	NOR	Bendik Bye (from (Norway) Sogndal)
18	MF	NOR	Stian Aasmundsen (from (Sweden) Jönköpings Södra)
22	MF	NOR	Bent Sørmo (from (Norway) Levanger)

Out: Note: Flags indicate national team as defined under FIFA eligibility rules; some limited exceptions apply. Players may hold more than one non-FIFA nationality.

No.	Pos.	Nation	Player
6	FW	NOR	Tor Erik Torske (to (Norway) Sunndal)
13	GK	CRO	Ante Knezovic (to (Serbia) Zemun)
18	FW	NOR	Jean Alassane Mendy (to (Belgium) Lokeren)
21	MF	NOR	Andreas Rødsand (released)
22	MF	NOR	Olav Øby (loan return to (Norway) Sarpsborg 08)
36	MF	NOR	Magne Hoseth (to (Norway) Averøykameratene)

=== Lillestrøm ===
In: Note: Flags indicate national team as defined under FIFA eligibility rules; some limited exceptions apply. Players may hold more than one non-FIFA nationality.

No.	Pos.	Nation	Player
9	FW	ENG	Gary Martin (from (Belgium) Lokeren)
10	FW	NOR	Thomas Lehne Olsen (from (Norway) Tromsø)
17	MF	NOR	Kristoffer Ødemarksbakken (from (Norway) Ull/Kisa)
25	GK	EST	Matvei Igonen (from (Estonia) FCI Tallinn)

Out: Note: Flags indicate national team as defined under FIFA eligibility rules; some limited exceptions apply. Players may hold more than one non-FIFA nationality.

No.	Pos.	Nation	Player
10	FW	NGA	Marco Tagbajumi (loan return to (Norway) Strømsgodset)
17	MF	NOR	Jørgen Kolstad (to (Norway) Kongsvinger, previously on loan)
21	FW	NOR	Petter Mathias Olsen (on loan to (Norway) Strømmen)
23	MF	BUL	Chigozie Udoji (to (Greece) Platanias)
28	MF	NOR	Henrik Loholt Kristiansen (to (Norway) Ullensaker/Kisa)
29	GK	NOR	Emil Ødegaard (on loan to (Norway) Grorud, previously on loan at (Norway) Levanger)
77	GK	KEN	Arnold Origi (to (Norway) Sandnes Ulf)
—	DF	SWE	Martin Falkeborn (on loan to (Sweden) Frej)

=== Molde ===
In: Note: Flags indicate national team as defined under FIFA eligibility rules; some limited exceptions apply. Players may hold more than one non-FIFA nationality.

No.	Pos.	Nation	Player
7	MF	NOR	Mathias Normann (on loan from (England) Brighton & Hove Albion)
16	MF	NOR	Etzaz Hussain (loan return from (Norway) Odd)
27	FW	NGA	Daniel Chima Chukwu (from (Poland) Legia Warsaw)
28	DF	NOR	Kristoffer Haugen (from (Norway) Viking)
—	FW	NGA	Leke James (from (China) Beijing Enterprises)

Out: Note: Flags indicate national team as defined under FIFA eligibility rules; some limited exceptions apply. Players may hold more than one non-FIFA nationality.

No.	Pos.	Nation	Player
2	DF	SWE	Isak Ssewankambo (on loan to (Sweden) Malmö FF)
3	DF	NOR	Ole Martin Rindarøy (to (Norway) Sogndal, previously on loan)
5	DF	FIN	Joona Toivio (to (Poland) Bruk-Bet Termalica Nieciecza)
10	FW	ISL	Björn Bergmann Sigurðarson (to (Russia) Rostov)
15	DF	FRO	Sonni Nattestad (on loan to (Norway) Aalesund)
18	DF	NOR	Leo Skiri Østigård (on loan to (Norway) Viking)
21	MF	BRA	Agnaldo (on loan to (Finland) RoPS, previously on loan at (Brazil) Vila Nova)
23	DF	NOR	Knut Olav Rindarøy (retired)
25	FW	ISL	Óttar Magnús Karlsson (on loan to (Sweden) Trelleborg)
27	DF	NOR	Martin Ove Roseth (on loan to (Norway) Levanger)
29	DF	NOR	Kristian Strande (to (Norway) Egersund, previously on loan at (Norway) Brattvåg)
34	GK	BRA	Neydson (to (Norway) Brattvåg, previously on loan at (Norway) Elverum)
59	FW	NOR	Adnan Dudić (to (Norway) Brattvåg, previously on loan at (Norway) Fram Larvik)
50	GK	NOR	Jonatan Byttingsvik (to (Norway) Levanger)
—	MF	NOR	Ola Ormset Husby (to (Norway) Brattvåg, previously on loan)
—	DF	FIN	Roni Peiponen (to (Finland) HJK Helsinki, previously on loan)

=== Odd ===
In: Note: Flags indicate national team as defined under FIFA eligibility rules; some limited exceptions apply. Players may hold more than one non-FIFA nationality.

No.	Pos.	Nation	Player
6	MF	NOR	Vebjørn Hoff (from (Norway) Aalesund)
9	FW	NOR	Birk Risa (from (Germany) 1. FC Köln)
19	MF	NOR	Bilal Njie (from (Norway) Vålerenga)
20	FW	NOR	Tobias Lauritsen (from (Norway) Pors)
22	FW	NOR	Torgeir Børven (from (Norway) Brann)

Out: Note: Flags indicate national team as defined under FIFA eligibility rules; some limited exceptions apply. Players may hold more than one non-FIFA nationality.

No.	Pos.	Nation	Player
6	MF	NOR	Oliver Berg (to (Sweden) Dalkurd)}
9	FW	NOR	Torbjørn Agdestein (to (Norway) Aalesund)
10	FW	CAN	Olivier Occéan (to (Norway) Urædd)
15	FW	NOR	Sigurd Hauso Haugen (to (Norway) Sogndal)
18	DF	NOR	Joakim Våge Nilsen (to (Norway) Haugesund)
19	MF	CAN	Zakaria Messoudi (released)
20	MF	NOR	Etzaz Hussain (loan return to (Norway) Molde)
22	MF	NOR	Erik Eikeng (to (Norway) Florø)
24	FW	FIN	Riku Riski (to (Finland) HJK Helsinki)
26	GK	NOR	Anders Klemensson (loan return to (Norway) Pors)
27	FW	SEN	Pape Paté Diouf (to (Norway) Arendal)

=== Ranheim ===
In: Note: Flags indicate national team as defined under FIFA eligibility rules; some limited exceptions apply. Players may hold more than one non-FIFA nationality.

No.	Pos.	Nation	Player
5	MF	NOR	Øyvind Alseth (from (Canada) Toronto)
11	MF	NOR	Eirik Valla Dønnem (from (Norway) Byåsen)
13	MF	NOR	Joachim Olufsen (from (Norway) Strindheim)
15	DF	NOR	Erik Tønne (from (Norway) Levanger)
18	DF	NOR	Ivar Furu (from (Norway) Byåsen)
19	DF	NOR	Glenn Walker (from (Norway) Rosenborg)
22	MF	NOR	Sivert Solli (from (Norway) Rosenborg)
25	MF	NOR	Marius Augdal (from (Norway) Stjørdals-Blink)
26	FW	NOR	Ola Solbakken (from (Norway) Rosenborg)
27	FW	NOR	Andreas Helmersen (on loan from (Norway) Rosenborg)

Out: Note: Flags indicate national team as defined under FIFA eligibility rules; some limited exceptions apply. Players may hold more than one non-FIFA nationality.

No.	Pos.	Nation	Player
11	FW	NOR	Georg Flatgård (to (Norway) Elverum)
13	GK	NOR	Alexander Hovdevik (to (Norway) Byåsen)
25	MF	NOR	Marius Augdal (on loan to (Norway) Stjørdals-Blink)
26	GK	NOR	Daniel Hagen (to (Norway) Egersund)

=== Rosenborg ===
In: Note: Flags indicate national team as defined under FIFA eligibility rules; some limited exceptions apply. Players may hold more than one non-FIFA nationality.

No.	Pos.	Nation	Player
14	FW	NOR	Alexander Søderlund (from (France) Saint-Ètienne)
16	DF	NOR	Even Hovland (from (Norway) Sogndal)
20	DF	DEN	Malte Amundsen (from (Denmark) HB Køge)
26	DF	BIH	Besim Šerbečić (from (Bosnia and Herzegovina) Radnik Bijeljina)
27	FW	NOR	Rafik Zekhnini (on loan from (Italy) Fiorentina)
30	DF	NGA	Igho Ogbu (from (Nigeria) Gombe United)
32	DF	NOR	Erlend Dahl Reitan (loan return from (Norway) Bodø/Glimt)

Out: Note: Flags indicate national team as defined under FIFA eligibility rules; some limited exceptions apply. Players may hold more than one non-FIFA nationality.

No.	Pos.	Nation	Player
14	DF	NOR	Johan Lædre Bjørdal (to (Belgium) Zulte Waregem)
16	DF	NOR	Jørgen Skjelvik (to (United States) LA Galaxy)
19	FW	NOR	Andreas Helmersen (on loan to (Norway) Ranheim)
20	DF	AUS	Alex Gersbach (on loan to (France) Lens)
26	FW	SRB	Milan Jevtović (loan return to (Turkey) Antalyaspor)
30	DF	NGA	Igho Ogbu (on loan to (Norway) Levanger)
33	GK	NOR	Julian Faye Lund (on loan to (Norway) Levanger)
—	FW	NOR	Erik Nordengen (to (Norway) Elverum)
—	FW	NOR	Ola Solbakken (to (Norway) Ranheim)
—	MF	NOR	Sivert Solli (to (Norway) Ranheim, previously on loan to (Norway) Elverum)
—	DF	NOR	Glenn Walker (to (Norway) Ranheim)
—	MF	NOR	Vegard Erlien (to (Norway) Sandnes Ulf)

=== Sandefjord ===
In: Note: Flags indicate national team as defined under FIFA eligibility rules; some limited exceptions apply. Players may hold more than one non-FIFA nationality.

No.	Pos.	Nation	Player
6	FW	NOR	Mohamed Ofkir (from (Belgium) Lokeren)
7	MF	ISL	Emil Pálsson (from (Iceland) FH Hafnarfjarðar)
12	GK	NOR	Eirik Holmen Johansen (from (United States) New York City)
13	DF	ENG	Andrew Eleftheriou (on loan from (England) Watford)
15	FW	SWE	Pontus Engblom (from (Norway) Strømsgodset)
—	DF	NOR	Sander Moen Foss (promoted from junior squad)

Out: Note: Flags indicate national team as defined under FIFA eligibility rules; some limited exceptions apply. Players may hold more than one non-FIFA nationality.

No.	Pos.	Nation	Player
5	DF	NOR	Alexander Gabrielsen (retired)
7	FW	URU	Facundo Rodríguez (loan return to (Uruguay) Peñarol)
10	MF	URU	Carlos Grossmüller (loan return to (Peru) Universitario)
12	GK	NOR	Øystein Øvretveit (to (Norway) Jerv)
14	DF	NED	Crescendo van Berkel (released)
18	MF	SWE	William Kurtovic (on loan to (Norway) Ull/Kisa)
20	DF	NOR	Kevin Jablinski (to (Norway) Raufoss)
21	FW	NOR	Håkon Lorentzen (on loan to (Norway) Åsane)
23	DF	NOR	Mats Holt (to (Norway) Kjelsås)
24	DF	NOR	Alf Øivind Aslesen (on loan to (Norway) Fram Larvik)

=== Sarpsborg 08 ===
In: Note: Flags indicate national team as defined under FIFA eligibility rules; some limited exceptions apply. Players may hold more than one non-FIFA nationality.

No.	Pos.	Nation	Player
3	MF	NOR	Harmeet Singh (from (Sweden) Kalmar)
4	DF	NOR	Bjørn Inge Utvik (from (Norway) Sogndal)
6	DF	EST	Joonas Tamm (from (Estonia) Flora Tallinn)
14	MF	NGA	Mohammed Usman (from (Portugal) União da Madeira)
15	MF	NOR	Gaute Høberg Vetti (from (Norway) Nest-Sotra)
18	FW	DEN	Mikkel Agger (from (Denmark) Thisted)
19	FW	NOR	Kristoffer Larsen (from (Denmark) Lyngby)
28	FW	NOR	Alexander Ruud Tveter (from (Sweden) Halmstad)
29	FW	DEN	Ronnie Schwartz (from (Belgium) Waasland-Beveren)
30	DF	CRO	Nikola Tkalčić (from (Sweden) IFK Norrköping)
31	GK	NOR	Aslak Falch (from (Sweden) IFK Norrköping)

Out: Note: Flags indicate national team as defined under FIFA eligibility rules; some limited exceptions apply. Players may hold more than one non-FIFA nationality.

No.	Pos.	Nation	Player
1	GK	SRB	Stefan Čupić (to (Serbia) Voždovac)
2	DF	DEN	Andreas Albech (to (Denmark) Vendsyssel)
3	DF	FIN	Henri Toivomäki (to (Finland) KuPS)
5	DF	ISL	Orri Sigurður Ómarsson (on loan to (Norway) HamKam, previously at (Iceland) Valur)
6	MF	DEN	Nicolai Poulsen (loan return to (Denmark) Randers)
9	FW	NGA	Kachi (to (Norway) Sandnes Ulf, previously on loan at (Norway) Strømmen)
10	FW	SWE	Jonas Lindberg (to (Sweden) GAIS)
13	DF	NOR	Ole Heieren Hansen (to (Norway) Kråkerøy)
15	DF	NOR	Sigurd Rosted (to (Belgium) Gent)
18	MF	NOR	Tor Øyvind Hovda (to (Norway) Hønefoss)
19	MF	SEN	Krépin Diatta (to (Belgium) Club Brugge)
23	MF	NOR	Kristoffer Normann Hansen (to (Norway) Ullensaker/Kisa)
24	MF	CPV	Erikson Spinola Lima (to (Norway) Aalesund)
24	FW	NOR	Amani Mbedule (on loan to (Norway) Notodden)
29	DF	NOR	Alexander Groven (to (Norway) Hønefoss)
—	DF	NOR	Leonard Getz (to (Norway) Fredrikstad)
—	MF	NOR	Olav Øby (to (Norway) Kongsvinger, previously on loan at (Norway) Kristiansund)

=== Stabæk ===
In: Note: Flags indicate national team as defined under FIFA eligibility rules; some limited exceptions apply. Players may hold more than one non-FIFA nationality.

No.	Pos.	Nation	Player
1	GK	NOR	Simen Lillevik Kjellevold (loan return from (Norway) Kongsvinger)
4	DF	NOR	Vadim Demidov (from (United States) Minnesota United)
5	DF	NOR	Steinar Strømnes (from (Norway) Strømmen)
9	FW	NOR	Abdul-Basit Agouda (from (Norway) Strømsgodset)
27	DF	NOR	Nicolas Pignatel Jenssen (promoted from junior squad)
50	FW	NOR	Oscar Aga (promoted from junior squad)
94	MF	NOR	Martin Rønning Ovenstad (on loan from (Austria) Sturm Graz)

Out: Note: Flags indicate national team as defined under FIFA eligibility rules; some limited exceptions apply. Players may hold more than one non-FIFA nationality.

No.	Pos.	Nation	Player
3	DF	NOR	Morten Skjønsberg (retired)
9	FW	NOR	Sindre Mauritz-Hansen (on loan to (Norway) Strømmen)
14	MF	NOR	Marius Østvold (to (Norway) Lyn)
17	DF	NOR	Ahmed El Amrani (to (Finland) Honka)
20	FW	USA	Rubio Rubin (to (Mexico) Tijuana)
22	GK	SWE	John Alvbåge (loan return to (Sweden) IFK Göteborg)
45	DF	NOR	Morten Renå Olsen (on loan to (Norway) HamKam)
67	MF	BEL	Tortol Lumanza (to (Turkey) Osmanlispor)
77	MF	CHN	Tao Hongliang (demoted to junior team)
79	FW	NOR	Sebastian Pedersen (to (Norway) Strømsgodset)
—	DF	NOR	Edvard Linnebo Race (to (Norway) Raufoss)
—	FW	NOR	Markus Myre Aanesland (to (Norway) Kongsvinger)

=== Start ===
In: Note: Flags indicate national team as defined under FIFA eligibility rules; some limited exceptions apply. Players may hold more than one non-FIFA nationality.

No.	Pos.	Nation	Player
2	DF	SWE	Elliot Käck (from (Sweden) Djurgården)
3	DF	NOR	Espen Hammer Berger (from (Norway) Levanger)
4	MF	NGA	Aremu Afeez (from (Ghana) Inter Allies)
7	FW	SWE	Kevin Kabran (from (Sweden) Brommapojkarna)
11	MF	ISL	Aron Sigurðarson (from (Norway) Tromsø)
17	FW	ISL	Guðmundur Andri Tryggvason (from (Iceland) KR Reykjavik)
18	MF	GHA	Isaac Twum (from (Ghana) Inter Allies)
19	MF	NOR	Kasper Skaanes (from (Norway) Brann)
20	FW	NOR	Mathias Bringaker (from (Norway) Viking)
21	MF	NOR	Niklas Sandberg (from (Norway) Ull/Kisa)
25	MF	NGA	Michael Ogungbaro (from (Norway) Jerv)
26	GK	GER	Jonas Deumeland (free transfer)
33	FW	SWE	Isac Lidberg (from (Sweden) Åtvidaberg)

Out: Note: Flags indicate national team as defined under FIFA eligibility rules; some limited exceptions apply. Players may hold more than one non-FIFA nationality.

No.	Pos.	Nation	Player
2	DF	NOR	Jens Kristian Skogmo (to (Norway) Arendal)
3	DF	FIN	Tapio Heikkilä (to (Norway) Sandnes Ulf)
4	MF	USA	Conor O'Brien (released)
7	MF	NED	Niels Vorthoren (to (Norway) Sandnes Ulf)
11	FW	NOR	Steffen Lie Skålevik (loan return to (Norway) Brann)
17	MF	ISL	Guðmundur Kristjánsson (to (Iceland) FH)
19	FW	NGA	Abubakar Ibrahim (on loan to (Norway) HamKam)
21	MF	NOR	Mikael Ugland (on loan to (Norway) Fløy)
25	MF	NGA	Michael Ogungbaro (on loan to (Norway) Åsane)
26	GK	NOR	Mats Olsen (to (Norway) Fløy)
28	DF	NOR	Rolf Daniel Vikstøl (to (Norway) Viking)
30	FW	NOR	Lasse Sigurdsen (on loan to (Norway) Fløy)}
32	MF	NOR	Thomas Zernichow (to (Norway) Jerv)
33	FW	GHA	Dennis Antwi (on loan to (Norway) Åsane)}
33	FW	SWE	Isac Lidberg (on loan to (Norway) Jerv)
—	DF	NOR	Philip Sandvik Aukland (on loan to (Norway) Arendal)}

=== Strømsgodset ===
In: Note: Flags indicate national team as defined under FIFA eligibility rules; some limited exceptions apply. Players may hold more than one non-FIFA nationality.

No.	Pos.	Nation	Player
7	MF	NOR	Herman Stengel (from (Norway) Vålerenga)
17	DF	NOR	Christopher Lindquist (loan return from (Norway) Florø)
30	FW	NOR	Mustafa Abdellaoue (from (Norway) Aalesund)
39	DF	NOR	Lars Sætra (from (China) Baoding Rongda)
90	FW	NOR	Amahl Pellegrino (from (Norway) Mjøndalen)
—	FW	NOR	Sebastian Pedersen (from (Norway) Stabæk)

Out: Note: Flags indicate national team as defined under FIFA eligibility rules; some limited exceptions apply. Players may hold more than one non-FIFA nationality.

No.	Pos.	Nation	Player
9	FW	SWE	Pontus Engblom (to (Norway) Sandefjord)
13	MF	SWE	Christian Rubio Sivodedov (on loan to (Sweden) GIF Sundsvall)
18	DF	NOR	Henrik Bredeli (to (Norway) Fram Larvik, previously on loan at (Norway) Fredrikstad)
33	FW	NGA	Marco Tagbajumi (to (Republic of Ireland) Dundalk, previously on loan at (Norway) Lillestrøm)
34	FW	NOR	Abdul-Basit Agouda (to (Norway) Stabæk)
40	GK	NOR	Morten Sætra (on loan to (Norway) Elverum, previously on loan at (Norway) Nybergsund-Trysil)
54	MF	NOR	Knut Ahlander (on loan to (Norway) Asker)
66	MF	NOR	Andreas Hoven (on loan to (Norway) Notodden)
—	FW	NOR	Sebastian Pedersen (on loan to (Norway) Strømmen)

=== Tromsø ===
In: Note: Flags indicate national team as defined under FIFA eligibility rules; some limited exceptions apply. Players may hold more than one non-FIFA nationality.

No.	Pos.	Nation	Player
2	DF	NOR	Tom Høgli (from (Denmark) Copenhagen)
8	MF	DEN	Oliver Kjærgaard (from (Denmark) Lyngby)
11	MF	FIN	Robert Taylor (on loan from (Sweden) AIK)
17	MF	NOR	Daniel Berntsen (from (Norway) Vålerenga)

Out: Note: Flags indicate national team as defined under FIFA eligibility rules; some limited exceptions apply. Players may hold more than one non-FIFA nationality.

No.	Pos.	Nation	Player
4	DF	SEN	Mehdi Dioury (on loan to (Norway) Tromsdalen)
8	MF	NOR	Ulrik Yttergård Jenssen (to (Denmark) Nordsjælland)
10	FW	NOR	Thomas Lehne Olsen (to (Norway) Lillestrøm)
11	MF	NOR	Jonas Johansen (retired)
17	MF	ISL	Aron Sigurðarson (to (Norway) Start)
19	MF	NOR	William Frantzen (released)
20	MF	NOR	Peter Aas (to (Norway) Alta)
21	GK	FIN	Otto Fredrikson (retired)
24	FW	NOR	Mikael Ingebrigtsen (to (Sweden) IFK Göteborg)
27	FW	NOR	Fredrik Michalsen (to (Norway) Fløya, previously on loan at (Iceland) Fjölnir)
35	FW	NOR	Garib Gerkondani (to (Norway) Finnsnes)
40	GK	ESP	Javier Jiménez Camarero (to (Spain) UCAM Murcia)
88	MF	RUS	Shamil Gasanov (to (Russia) Yenisey Krasnoyarsk)

=== Vålerenga ===
In: Note: Flags indicate national team as defined under FIFA eligibility rules; some limited exceptions apply. Players may hold more than one non-FIFA nationality.

No.	Pos.	Nation	Player
5	DF	URU	Felipe Carvalho (from (Sweden) Malmö FF)
10	FW	LBR	Sam Johnson (from (China) Wuhan Zall)
19	FW	NGA	Peter Godly Michael
25	DF	CAN	Sam Adekugbe (from (Canada) Vancouver Whitecaps)
30	DF	POR	João Meira (from (United States) Chicago Fire)
33	DF	NOR	Amin Nouri (from (Norway) Brann)

Out: Note: Flags indicate national team as defined under FIFA eligibility rules; some limited exceptions apply. Players may hold more than one non-FIFA nationality.

No.	Pos.	Nation	Player
2	DF	NOR	Markus Nakkim (on loan to (Norway) Viking)
5	DF	SWE	Robert Lundström (to (Sweden) AIK)
14	MF	NOR	Herman Stengel (to (Norway) Strømsgodset)
15	MF	NOR	Daniel Berntsen (to (Norway) Tromsø)
19	MF	NOR	Christian Grindheim (to (Norway) Haugesund)
20	FW	NOR	Henrik Kjelsrud Johansen (to (Norway) Brann)
25	FW	NOR	Mohammed Abdellaoue (retired)
26	MF	NOR	Aron Dønnum (on loan to (Norway) HamKam)
28	FW	NOR	Thomas Elsebutangen (on loan to (Norway) Bærum)
31	DF	NOR	Mathusan Sandrakumar (to (Norway) Bærum, previously on loan at (Norway) Strømmen)
38	DF	NOR	Kristoffer Hay (on loan to (Norway) Tromsdalen)
51	MF	NOR	Bilal Njie (to (Norway) Odd)

== OBOS-ligaen ==
=== Aalesund ===
In: Note: Flags indicate national team as defined under FIFA eligibility rules; some limited exceptions apply. Players may hold more than one non-FIFA nationality.

No.	Pos.	Nation	Player
4	DF	FRO	Sonni Nattestad (on loan from (Norway) Molde)
7	MF	CPV	Erikson Spinola Lima (from (Norway) Sarpsborg 08)
10	FW	ISL	Hólmbert Friðjónsson (from (Iceland) Stjarnan)
13	GK	NOR	Tarjei Aase Omenås (from (Norway) Sogndal)
19	MF	ENG	Jernade Meade (from (Sweden) AFC Eskilstuna)
20	DF	NOR	Robert Sandnes (from (Iceland) KR Reykjavík)
23	FW	NOR	Torbjørn Agdestein (from (Norway) Odd)
—	FW	SEN	Pape Habib Guèye (from (Senegal) Académie Foot Darou Salam)

Out: Note: Flags indicate national team as defined under FIFA eligibility rules; some limited exceptions apply. Players may hold more than one non-FIFA nationality.

No.	Pos.	Nation	Player
2	DF	DEN	Mikkel Kirkeskov (on loan to (Poland) Piast Gliwice)
9	FW	SWE	Valmir Berisha (on loan to (Iceland) Fjölnir)
10	FW	GRE	Thanasis Papazoglou (loan return to (Belgium) Kortrijk)
16	FW	GHA	Edwin Gyasi (to (Bulgaria) CSKA Sofia)
15	MF	BRA	Marlinho (to (Norway) Kongsvinger)
18	MF	NOR	Vebjørn Hoff (to (Norway) Odd)
25	GK	NOR	Jan-Lennart Urke (loan return to (Norway) Hødd)
30	FW	NOR	Mustafa Abdellaoue (to (Norway) Strømsgodset)
37	DF	NOR	Joakim Barstad (to (Norway) Brattvåg)

=== Florø ===
In: Note: Flags indicate national team as defined under FIFA eligibility rules; some limited exceptions apply. Players may hold more than one non-FIFA nationality.

No.	Pos.	Nation	Player
3	DF	NOR	Dejan Corovic (from (Norway) Arendal)
9	FW	FRO	Patrik Johannesen (from (Faroe Islands) B36 Tórshavn)
10	FW	DEN	Lorent Callaku (from (Denmark) Greve)
22	MF	NOR	Erik Eikeng (from (Norway) Odd)
24	MF	NOR	Robert Kling (from (Norway) Haugesund)

Out: Note: Flags indicate national team as defined under FIFA eligibility rules; some limited exceptions apply. Players may hold more than one non-FIFA nationality.

No.	Pos.	Nation	Player
3	DF	NOR	Martin Hollevik (to (Norway) Sotra)
9	FW	NOR	Endre Kupen (to (Norway) Bodø/Glimt)
17	FW	NOR	Monir Benmoussa (released)
20	MF	NOR	Erlend Hove (retired)
77	DF	NOR	Christopher Lindquist (loan return to (Norway) Strømsgodset)

=== HamKam ===
In: Note: Flags indicate national team as defined under FIFA eligibility rules; some limited exceptions apply. Players may hold more than one non-FIFA nationality.

No.	Pos.	Nation	Player
1	GK	DEN	Marco Priis Jørgensen (from (Norway) Mjøndalen)
2	DF	NOR	Morten Renå Olsen (on loan from (Norway) Stabæk)
3	DF	ISL	Orri Sigurður Ómarsson (on loan from (Norway) Sarpsborg 08)
5	DF	NOR	Lars Brotangen (from (Norway) Kjelsås)
15	MF	NOR	Aron Dønnum (on loan from (Norway) Vålerenga)
20	FW	NOR	Johnny Per Buduson (from (Norway) Haugesund)
22	MF	NOR	Kristian Lønstad Onsrud (from (Norway) Raufoss)
27	MF	NOR	Peder Nersveen (from (Norway) Elverum)
99	FW	NGA	Abubakar Ibrahim (on loan from (Norway) Start)

Out: Note: Flags indicate national team as defined under FIFA eligibility rules; some limited exceptions apply. Players may hold more than one non-FIFA nationality.

No.	Pos.	Nation	Player
—	GK	NOR	Lars Jendal (on loan to (Norway) Nybergsund-Trysil)
2	DF	ESP	Juan Manuel Cordero Santana (to (Norway) Alta)
3	DF	NOR	John Anders Rise (retired)
5	DF	NOR	Marius Bratberg Lund (to (Norway) Kjelsås)
6	MF	DEN	Franck Semou (released)
15	DF	BFA	François Yabré (to (Norway) Mjølner)
16	FW	NOR	Håvard Dalseth (released)
18	FW	CIV	Kevin Beugré (to (Norway) Fram Larvik)
21	FW	NOR	Mikkel Frankmo (to (Norway) Brumunddal)
99	FW	NOR	Markus Naglestad (to (Norway) Hødd)

=== Jerv ===
In: Note: Flags indicate national team as defined under FIFA eligibility rules; some limited exceptions apply. Players may hold more than one non-FIFA nationality.

No.	Pos.	Nation	Player
5	MF	NGA	Izuchuckwu Anthony (on loan from (Norway) Haugesund)
8	MF	NOR	Thomas Zernichow (from (Norway) Start)
9	MF	NOR	Tor André Skimmeland Aasheim (from (Norway) Viking)
10	FW	NOR	Aram Khalili (from (Norway) Bryne)
20	GK	NOR	Øystein Øvretveit (from (Norway) Sandefjord)
33	FW	SWE	Isac Lidberg (on loan from (Norway) Start)
95	FW	BRA	Luke Ferreira (from (United States) Palm Beach Suns)

Out: Note: Flags indicate national team as defined under FIFA eligibility rules; some limited exceptions apply. Players may hold more than one non-FIFA nationality.

No.	Pos.	Nation	Player
5	DF	NOR	Nils Petter Andersen (to (Norway) Fløy)
8	MF	NOR	Christopher McConnagher (retired)
9	MF	NOR	Eirik Haugstad (to (Norway) Lyn)}
10	MF	ARU	Erixon Danso (to (Norway) Sandnes Ulf)
13	MF	NGA	Babajide David (loan return to (Denmark) Midtjylland)
12	GK	NOR	Stian Christensen (released)
20	FW	NOR	Jakob Toft (released)
25	MF	NGA	Michael Ogungbaro (to (Norway) Start)
45	FW	GNB	Idelino Colubali (loan return to (Portugal) Boavista)
15	DF	NOR	Halvor Hovstad (on loan to (Norway) Vindbjart)

=== Kongsvinger ===
In: Note: Flags indicate national team as defined under FIFA eligibility rules; some limited exceptions apply. Players may hold more than one non-FIFA nationality.

No.	Pos.	Nation	Player
1	GK	NOR	Idar Nordby Lysgård (from (Norway) Skeid)
3	DF	NOR	Edvard Skagestad (from (Norway) Fredrikstad)
8	MF	NOR	Nicolai Fremstad (from (Norway) Raufoss)
11	MF	NOR	Olav Øby (from (Norway) Sarpsborg 08)
13	FW	NOR	Markus Myre Aanesland (from (Norway) Stabæk)
15	MF	BRA	Marlinho (from (Norway) Aalesund)
17	MF	NOR	Jørgen Kolstad (from (Norway) Lillestrøm, previously on loan)
18	DF	NOR	Iman Mafi (from (Norway) Vindbjart)
19	DF	NOR	Martin Lundal (from (Norway) Nardo)
20	MF	NOR	Even Bydal (from (Norway) Asker)
21	DF	NOR	Daniel Lysgård (promoted from junior squad)
24	DF	NOR	Ridouan Essaeh (from (Norway) Skeid)
25	GK	CAN	Simon Thomas (from (Norway) Bodø/Glimt)
26	FW	NGA	Shuaibu Ibrahim (on loan from (Norway) Haugesund)
27	GK	GER	Tobias Trautner (from (Norway) Strømmen)

Out: Note: Flags indicate national team as defined under FIFA eligibility rules; some limited exceptions apply. Players may hold more than one non-FIFA nationality.

No.	Pos.	Nation	Player
1	GK	NOR	Simen Lillevik (loan return to (Norway) Stabæk)
3	DF	NOR	Jørgen Richardsen (to (Iceland) Víkingur)
7	DF	AUS	Dylan Murnane (to (Finland) IFK Mariehamn)
11	FW	ESP	Maikel Nieves (to (Sweden) Brommapojkarna)
13	MF	POR	Hélio Pinto (to (India) NorthEast United)
15	DF	RUS	Kirill Suslov (to (Russia) Amkar Perm)
19	FW	SWE	Pär Ericsson (to (Sweden) Karlstad)
26	FW	SEN	Mame Niang (to (South Africa) Royal Eagles)

=== Levanger ===
In: Note: Flags indicate national team as defined under FIFA eligibility rules; some limited exceptions apply. Players may hold more than one non-FIFA nationality.

No.	Pos.	Nation	Player
1	GK	NOR	Julian Faye Lund (on loan from (Norway) Rosenborg)
2	DF	SWE	Viktor Ljung (from (Sweden) Helsingborg)
6	DF	NOR	Martin Ove Roseth (on loan from (Norway) Molde)
7	MF	SWE	Andreas Peterson (from (Sweden) GAIS)
9	MF	SWE	Ermal Hajdari (from (Sweden) Whitehawk)
12	GK	NOR	Jonatan Byttingsvik (from (Norway) Molde)
15	MF	NOR	Håvard Lorentsen (from (Norway) Steinkjer)
17	DF	FIN	Hampus Holmgren (from (Sweden) Åtvidabergs FF)
19	DF	NGA	Igho Ogbu (on loan from (Norway) Rosenborg)
21	MF	FIN	Solomon Duah (from (Finland) KuPS)

Out: Note: Flags indicate national team as defined under FIFA eligibility rules; some limited exceptions apply. Players may hold more than one non-FIFA nationality.

No.	Pos.	Nation	Player
1	GK	NOR	Ola Rygg (to (Norway) Verdal)
6	MF	SWE	Joakim Wrele (to (Norway) Hødd)
9	MF	NOR	Kim Robert Nyborg (to (Norway) Egersund)
11	FW	NOR	Joachim Osvold (to (Norway) Hødd)
15	DF	NOR	Erik Tønne (to (Norway) Ranheim)
17	MF	SWE	Marcus Astvald (to (Sweden) Brage)
18	DF	NOR	Per Verner Rønning (retired)
19	DF	NOR	Espen Hammer Berger (to (Norway) Start)
25	MF	NOR	Bent Sørmo (to (Norway) Kristiansund)
29	GK	NOR	Emil Ødegaard (loan return to (Norway) Lillestrøm)

=== Mjøndalen ===
In: Note: Flags indicate national team as defined under FIFA eligibility rules; some limited exceptions apply. Players may hold more than one non-FIFA nationality.

No.	Pos.	Nation	Player
5	DF	NOR	Alexander Betten Hansen (from (Norway) Fram Larvik)
6	DF	SWE	Sebastian Starke Hedlund (on loan from (Sweden) Kalmar)
7	MF	NOR	Ylldren Ibrahimaj (from (Norway) Arendal)
8	FW	PLE	Mahmoud Eid (on loan from (Sweden) Kalmar)
12	GK	SWE	Lukas Jonsson (on loan from (Sweden) Sirius)
21	FW	NOR	Alfred Scriven (from (Norway) Hallingdal)

Out: Note: Flags indicate national team as defined under FIFA eligibility rules; some limited exceptions apply. Players may hold more than one non-FIFA nationality.

No.	Pos.	Nation	Player
1	GK	IRN	Sosha Makani (on loan to (Iran) Sanat Naft Abadan)
3	DF	NOR	Petter Havsgård Martinsen (to (Norway) Nest-Sotra, previously on loan)
5	DF	NOR	Ulrik Arneberg (retired)
7	FW	NOR	Amahl Pellegrino (to (Norway) Strømsgodset)
8	MF	NGA	Kingsley Olie (released)
9	MF	NOR	Mads Hansen (retired)
10	FW	LTU	Simonas Stankevičius (released, previously on loan at (Norway) Egersund)
21	MF	NOR	Magnus Sylling Olsen (retired)
30	GK	DEN	Marco Priis Jørgensen (to (Norway) HamKam, previously on loan at (Norway) Arendal)

=== Nest-Sotra ===
In: Note: Flags indicate national team as defined under FIFA eligibility rules; some limited exceptions apply. Players may hold more than one non-FIFA nationality.

No.	Pos.	Nation	Player
1	GK	NOR	Egil Selvik (on loan from (Norway) Sandnes Ulf)
7	MF	NOR	Morten Bjørlo (from (Norway) Egersund)
8	MF	SWE	Haris Cirak (from (Sweden) AFC Eskilstuna)
9	FW	NOR	Sondre Liseth (from (Norway) Fana)
12	DF	NOR	Petter Havsgård Martinsen (from (Norway) Mjøndalen, previously on loan)
20	MF	NOR	Halldor Stenevik (on loan from (Norway) Brann)
22	DF	NOR	Mads Bjørsvik Songve (from (Norway) Åsane)
23	MF	NOR	Bendik Torset (from (Norway) Hødd)
29	MF	NOR	Kristoffer Nesse Stephensen (from (Norway) Åsane)
96	GK	CAN	Yann-Alexandre Fillion (on loan from (Switzerland) FC Zürich)

Out: Note: Flags indicate national team as defined under FIFA eligibility rules; some limited exceptions apply. Players may hold more than one non-FIFA nationality.

No.	Pos.	Nation	Player
1	GK	NOR	Martin Sanchez Olsen (retired)
8	MF	NOR	Akinbola Akinyemi (to (Norway) Notodden)
14	MF	NOR	Gaute Høberg Vetti (to (Norway) Sarpsborg 08)
70	MF	NOR	Rune Johan Åsheim (to (Norway) Lysekloster)

=== Notodden ===
In: Note: Flags indicate national team as defined under FIFA eligibility rules; some limited exceptions apply. Players may hold more than one non-FIFA nationality.

No.	Pos.	Nation	Player
6	DF	ENG	Michael Ledger (from (England) Sunderland)
14	DF	SWE	Jonathan Asp (from (Sweden) Åtvidaberg)
15	MF	POR	Filipe Ferreira (from (Croatia) Istra 1961)
18	DF	ENG	Josh Robson (on loan from (England) Sunderland)
19	MF	NOR	Andreas Hoven (on loan from (Norway) Strømsgodset)
20	FW	NOR	Amani Mbedule (on loan from (Norway) Sarpsborg 08)
26	MF	NOR	Akinbola Akinyemi (from (Norway) Nest-Sotra)

Out: Note: Flags indicate national team as defined under FIFA eligibility rules; some limited exceptions apply. Players may hold more than one non-FIFA nationality.

No.	Pos.	Nation	Player
6	DF	SWE	Filip Almström-Tähti (to (Sweden) Örgryte)
7	MF	NOR	Borgar Velta (retired)
15	FW	NOR	Jim Johansen (released)
17	DF	NOR	Eric Kitolano (to (Norway) Ull/Kisa)
23	FW	NOR	Ole Marius Aasen (retired)

=== Sandnes Ulf ===
In: Note: Flags indicate national team as defined under FIFA eligibility rules; some limited exceptions apply. Players may hold more than one non-FIFA nationality.

No.	Pos.	Nation	Player
3	DF	FRO	Ári Jónsson (from (Faroe Islands) HB Tórshavn)
5	DF	NOR	Daniel Edvardsen (from (Norway) Bodø/Glimt)
6	MF	NED	Niels Vorthoren (from (Norway) Start)
9	FW	NGA	Kachi (from (Norway) Sarpsborg 08)
11	MF	ARU	Erixon Danso (from (Norway) Jerv)
12	GK	LVA	Deniss Korneičiks (from (Norway) Bryne)
14	DF	NOR	Akinshola Akinyemi (from (Norway) Fredrikstad)
15	MF	NOR	Vegard Erlien (from (Norway) Rosenborg)
16	DF	FIN	Tapio Heikkilä (from (Norway) Start)
21	MF	NOR	Herman Kleppa (from (Norway) Viking)
77	GK	KEN	Arnold Origi (from (Norway) Lillestrøm)

Out: Note: Flags indicate national team as defined under FIFA eligibility rules; some limited exceptions apply. Players may hold more than one non-FIFA nationality.

No.	Pos.	Nation	Player
3	DF	NOR	Viljar Vevatne (to (Norway) Viking)
6	MF	NOR	Tomas Kristoffersen (to (Norway) Åsane)
9	FW	NOR	Oddbjørn Skartun (to (Norway) Vard Haugesund)
10	MF	NOR	Roy Miljeteig (to (Norway) Egersund)
12	GK	NOR	Egil Selvik (on loan to (Norway) Nest-Sotra)
13	DF	NOR	Jørgen Olsen (to (Norway) Egersund)
17	FW	NOR	Roger Blokkhus Ekeland (on loan to (Norway) Egersund)
17	DF	DEN	Nicolai Geertsen (to (Denmark) Hillerød)
19	DF	DEN	Mads Nielsen (to (Norway) Fredrikstad)
21	FW	NOR	Kjell Rune Sellin (to (Norway) Fredrikstad)
26	DF	NOR	Kenneth Sola (retired)
33	GK	NOR	Jonas Høidahl (released)

=== Sogndal ===
In: Note: Flags indicate national team as defined under FIFA eligibility rules; some limited exceptions apply. Players may hold more than one non-FIFA nationality.

No.	Pos.	Nation	Player
2	DF	NGA	Akeem Latifu (from (Hungary) Budapest Honvéd)
6	MF	NOR	Henrik Furebotn (loan return from (Norway) Fredrikstad)
8	FW	NOR	Ulrik Flo (from (Norway) Fredrikstad)
12	GK	NOR	Kjetil Haug (from (England) Manchester City)
14	DF	NOR	Ole Martin Rindarøy (from (Norway) Molde, previously on loan)
18	FW	NOR	Sigurd Hauso Haugen (from (Norway) Odd)
29	DF	NOR	Tomas Totland (loan return from Fana)

Out: Note: Flags indicate national team as defined under FIFA eligibility rules; some limited exceptions apply. Players may hold more than one non-FIFA nationality.

No.	Pos.	Nation	Player
2	DF	EST	Taijo Teniste (to (Norway) Brann)
3	DF	NOR	Bjørn Inge Utvik (to (Norway) Sarpsborg 08)
4	MF	NGA	Chidiebere Nwakali (loan return to (England) Manchester City)
8	FW	NOR	Fredrik Flo (on loan to (Norway) Fana, previously on loan at (Norway) Bryne)
10	MF	GHA	Gilbert Koomson (to (Norway) Brann)
13	GK	NOR	Tarjei Aase Omenås (to (Norway) Aalesund)
17	DF	FRA	Christophe Psyché (to (Czech Republic) Baník Ostrava)
18	FW	NOR	Bendik Bye (to (Norway) Kristiansund)
24	DF	NOR	Eirik Bergum Skaasheim (retired)
26	DF	DEN	Magnus Pedersen (to (Denmark) Middelfart, previously on loan at (Norway) Elverum)
37	DF	NOR	Espen Næss Lund (retired)
40	DF	NOR	Even Hovland (to (Norway) Rosenborg)

=== Strømmen ===
In: Note: Flags indicate national team as defined under FIFA eligibility rules; some limited exceptions apply. Players may hold more than one non-FIFA nationality.

No.	Pos.	Nation	Player
5	DF	NOR	Sverre Bjørkkjær (from (Norway) Haugesund)
7	FW	NOR	Petter Mathias Olsen (on loan from (Norway) Lillestrøm)
14	FW	NOR	Sindre Mauritz-Hansen (on loan from (Norway) Stabæk)
17	MF	NOR	Øystein Vestvatn (from (Norway) Follo)
—	DF	NOR	Mansour Gueye (from (Norway) Skeid)
—	FW	NOR	Sebastian Pedersen (on loan from (Norway) Strømsgodset)

Out: Note: Flags indicate national team as defined under FIFA eligibility rules; some limited exceptions apply. Players may hold more than one non-FIFA nationality.

No.	Pos.	Nation	Player
1	GK	GER	Tobias Trautner (to (Norway) Kongsvinger)
5	MF	NOR	Steinar Strømnes (to (Norway) Stabæk)
6	DF	NOR	Mathusan Sandrakumar (loan return to (Norway) Vålerenga)
17	MF	NOR	Kristian Bjørndalen (to (Norway) Gjelleråsen, previously on loan at (Norway) Lørenskog)
88	MF	NOR	Stian Rasch (retired)
99	FW	NGA	Kachi (loan return to (Norway) Sarpsborg 08)

=== Tromsdalen ===
In: Note: Flags indicate national team as defined under FIFA eligibility rules; some limited exceptions apply. Players may hold more than one non-FIFA nationality.

No.	Pos.	Nation	Player
15	DF	NOR	Kristoffer Hay (on loan from (Norway) Vålerenga)
17	DF	NOR	Martin Albertsen (loan return from (Norway) Senja)
30	GK	NOR	Marius Berntzen (from (Faroe Islands) TB/FC Suðuroy/Royn)
66	MF	NOR	Andreas Løvland (from (Norway) Finnsnes)

Out: Note: Flags indicate national team as defined under FIFA eligibility rules; some limited exceptions apply. Players may hold more than one non-FIFA nationality.

No.	Pos.	Nation	Player
9	FW	NOR	Christer Johnsgård (to (Norway) Senja, previously on loan)
22	GK	POL	Grzegorz Flasza (to (Norway) Arendal)
24	DF	NOR	Jonas Høylo Funingsrud (to (Norway) Fløya)
27	DF	NOR	Vetle Walnum Vinje (to (Norway) Valhall)

=== Ull/Kisa ===
In: Note: Flags indicate national team as defined under FIFA eligibility rules; some limited exceptions apply. Players may hold more than one non-FIFA nationality.

No.	Pos.	Nation	Player
6	DF	NOR	Eric Kitolano (from (Norway) Notodden)
15	MF	SWE	William Kurtovic (on loan from (Norway) Sandefjord)
16	MF	NOR	Henrik Loholt Kristiansen (from (Norway) Lillestrøm)
19	MF	NOR	Kristoffer Normann Hansen (from (Norway) Sarpsborg 08)
20	DF	NOR	Morten Sundli (from (Sweden) Öster)

Out: Note: Flags indicate national team as defined under FIFA eligibility rules; some limited exceptions apply. Players may hold more than one non-FIFA nationality.

No.	Pos.	Nation	Player
6	MF	NOR	Markus Furseth (to (Norway) Eidsvold Turn)
10	MF	NOR	Niklas Sandberg (to (Norway) Start)
12	GK	NOR	Fredrik Johansen Mundal (on loan to (Norway) Skedsmo, previously on loan at (Norway) Skjetten)
16	MF	NOR	Kristoffer Ødemarksbakken (to (Norway) Lillestrøm)
24	DF	NOR	Martin Rosenkilde (to (Norway) Skjetten)
—	FW	NOR	Markus Stensby (to (Norway) Eidsvold Turn, previously on loan)

=== Viking ===
In: Note: Flags indicate national team as defined under FIFA eligibility rules; some limited exceptions apply. Players may hold more than one non-FIFA nationality.

No.	Pos.	Nation	Player
3	DF	NOR	Viljar Vevatne (from (Norway) Sandnes Ulf)
4	DF	NOR	Tord Johnsen Salte (on loan from (France) Lyon)
5	DF	NOR	Markus Nakkim (on loan from (Norway) Vålerenga)
6	DF	NOR	Leo Skiri Østigård (on loan from (Norway) Molde)
8	FW	NGA	Aniekpeno Udoh (loan return from (Sweden) Ljungskile)
11	MF	NOR	Zlatko Tripić (from (Moldova) Sheriff Tiraspol)
21	MF	ENG	Jordan Hallam (on loan from (England) Sheffield United)
23	DF	NOR	Rolf Daniel Vikstøl (from (Norway) Start)
28	MF	NOR	Kristian Thorstvedt (from (Norway) Stabæk 2)
30	MF	NOR	Stian Michalsen (loan return from (Sweden) Ljungskile)

Out: Note: Flags indicate national team as defined under FIFA eligibility rules; some limited exceptions apply. Players may hold more than one non-FIFA nationality.

No.	Pos.	Nation	Player
3	DF	NOR	Andreas Nordvik (to (Denmark) Fredericia)
4	DF	ESP	José Cruz (to (Spain) Mérida)
7	MF	ENG	George Green (to (England) Nuneaton Town)
8	MF	ENG	Ross Jenkins (to (Scotland) Hamilton Academical)
13	DF	CRO	Šime Gregov (to (Iran) Tractor Sazi)
19	MF	NOR	Michael Haukås (retired)
20	MF	NOR	Tor André Skimmeland Aasheim (to (Norway) Jerv)
21	MF	NOR	Herman Kleppa (to (Norway) Sandnes Ulf, previously on loan at (Norway) Vidar)
27	FW	NOR	Mathias Bringaker (to (Norway) Start)
28	DF	NOR	Kristoffer Haugen (to (Norway) Molde)
99	FW	CIV	Ghislain Guessan (released)
—	DF	NOR	Erik Steen (to (Norway) Vidar, previously on loan)

=== Åsane ===
In: Note: Flags indicate national team as defined under FIFA eligibility rules; some limited exceptions apply. Players may hold more than one non-FIFA nationality.

No.	Pos.	Nation	Player
6	MF	NOR	Andreas Fantoft (from (Norway) Brann)
7	MF	NOR	Tomas Kristoffersen (from (Norway) Sandnes Ulf)
14	DF	NOR	Ole Martin Kolskogen (from (Norway) Os)
18	FW	NOR	Erik Huseklepp (from (Norway) Haugesund, previously on loan)
21	FW	NOR	Håkon Lorentzen (on loan from (Norway) Sandefjord)
23	DF	NOR	Viljar Birkeland (from (Norway) Brann)
25	DF	NOR	Aleksander Solli (from (Norway) Asker)
30	MF	NGA	Michael Ogungbaro (on loan from (Norway) Start)
33	FW	GHA	Dennis Antwi (on loan from (Norway) Start)}

Out: Note: Flags indicate national team as defined under FIFA eligibility rules; some limited exceptions apply. Players may hold more than one non-FIFA nationality.

No.	Pos.	Nation	Player
3	DF	NOR	Eirik Wollen Steen (to (Norway) Bodø/Glimt)
22	DF	NOR	Mads Bjørsvik Songve (to (Norway) Nest-Sotra)
29	MF	NOR	Kristoffer Nesse Stephensen (to (Norway) Nest-Sotra)
88	FW	NOR	Geir André Herrem (to (Norway) Bodø/Glimt)
