= 2017 Viking FK season =

Viking
2017 season
- Chair: Stig Christiansen
- Manager: Ian Burchnall (until 9 November); Bjarte Lunde Aarsheim (from 9 November)
- Stadium: Viking Stadion
- Eliteserien: 16th (relegated)
- Cup: Second round
- Top goalscorer: League: Samuel Adegbenro (6); All: Samuel Adegbenro (6)
- Highest home attendance: 9,838 vs Brann (20 August)
- Lowest home attendance: 6,157 vs Stabæk (26 November)
- Average home league attendance: 7,380
Home colours	Away colours

The 2017 season was Viking's 29th consecutive year in Eliteserien, and their 68th season in the top flight of Norwegian football.

== Season events ==
Ian Burchnall replaced Kjell Jonevret as manager on 24 November 2016.

Almost a year later, on 9 November 2017, Burchnall was fired from the job following the club's relegation to OBOS-ligaen.

== Squad ==
As of match played 26 November 2017

Note: Flags indicate national team as defined under FIFA eligibility rules; some limited exceptions apply. Players may hold more than one non-FIFA nationality.

No.	Pos.	Nation	Player
1	GK	NOR	Iven Austbø (vice-captain)
2	DF	NOR	Rasmus Martinsen
3	DF	NOR	Andreas Nordvik
4	DF	ESP	José Cruz
7	MF	ENG	George Green
8	MF	ENG	Ross Jenkins
9	MF	NOR	Fredrik Torsteinbø
10	FW	NOR	Tommy Høiland
11	FW	NOR	Zymer Bytyqi
13	DF	CRO	Šime Gregov
14	MF	NOR	André Danielsen (captain)

No.	Pos.	Nation	Player
15	GK	NOR	Amund Wichne
17	MF	DEN	Steffen Ernemann
18	MF	NOR	Julian Ryerson
19	MF	NOR	Michael Haukås
20	FW	NOR	Tor André Skimmeland Aasheim
22	DF	DEN	Claes Kronberg
25	FW	NGR	Usman Sale
26	MF	NOR	Tore André Sørås
27	FW	NOR	Mathias Bringaker
28	DF	NOR	Kristoffer Haugen
99	FW	CIV	Ghislain Guessan

=== Out on loan ===
As of 9 August 2017

Note: Flags indicate national team as defined under FIFA eligibility rules; some limited exceptions apply. Players may hold more than one non-FIFA nationality.

No.	Pos.	Nation	Player
21	MF	NOR	Herman Kleppa (at Vidar)
30	FW	NOR	Stian Michalsen (at Ljungskile)

No.	Pos.	Nation	Player
—	DF	NOR	Erik Steen (at Vidar)
—	FW	NGR	Aniekpeno Udo (at Ljungskile)

== Transfers ==
=== Winter ===
In: Note: Flags indicate national team as defined under FIFA eligibility rules; some limited exceptions apply. Players may hold more than one non-FIFA nationality.

No.	Pos.	Nation	Player
6	DF	ENG	Michael Ledger (on loan from (England) Sunderland)
10	FW	GHA	Kwesi Appiah (on loan from (England) Crystal Palace)
17	MF	DEN	Steffen Ernemann (from (Norway) Sarpsborg 08)
23	FW	NIR	Robin Shroot (on loan from (Norway) Hødd)
41	DF	NOR	Kristian Novak (from (Norway) Ålgård)

Out: Note: Flags indicate national team as defined under FIFA eligibility rules; some limited exceptions apply. Players may hold more than one non-FIFA nationality.

No.	Pos.	Nation	Player
4	DF	NOR	Joackim Jørgensen (to (Norway) Sarpsborg 08)
8	MF	ENG	Chris Dawson (loan return to (England) Rotherham United)
8	FW	NGR	Aniekpeno Udo (on loan to (Norway) Levanger)
16	MF	NOR	Abdisalam Ibrahim (to (Norway) Vålerenga)
23	MF	ISL	Steinþór Þorsteinsson (to (Iceland) KA)
24	GK	NOR	Pål Vestly Heigre (to (Norway) Aalesund)
26	DF	NOR	Erik Steen (on loan to (Norway) Vidar)
29	FW	NOR	Martin Hummervoll (to (Norway) Vidar)
—	DF	NOR	Per Magnus Steiring (loan return to (Norway) Rosenborg)

=== Summer ===
In: Note: Flags indicate national team as defined under FIFA eligibility rules; some limited exceptions apply. Players may hold more than one non-FIFA nationality.

No.	Pos.	Nation	Player
3	DF	NOR	Andreas Nordvik (from (Denmark) Esbjerg)
4	DF	ESP	José Cruz (from (Spain) Racing Ferrol)
7	MF	ENG	George Green (from (England) Burnley)
8	MF	ENG	Ross Jenkins (from (Bulgaria) Pirin Blagoevgrad)
9	MF	NOR	Fredrik Torsteinbø (from (Sweden) Hammarby)
10	FW	NOR	Tommy Høiland (from (Norway) Strømsgodset)
13	DF	CRO	Šime Gregov (from (Slovenia) Koper)
26	MF	NOR	Tore André Sørås (from (Norway) Follo)
99	FW	CIV	Ghislain Guessan (from (Algeria) RC Arbaâ)
—	FW	NGR	Aniekpeno Udo (loan return from (Norway) Levanger)

Out: Note: Flags indicate national team as defined under FIFA eligibility rules; some limited exceptions apply. Players may hold more than one non-FIFA nationality.

No.	Pos.	Nation	Player
4	DF	ENG	Michael Ledger (loan return to (England) Sunderland)
6	DF	EST	Karol Mets (to (Netherlands) NAC Breda)
7	FW	NGR	Samuel Adegbenro (to (Norway) Rosenborg)
9	FW	DEN	Patrick Pedersen (to (Iceland) Valur)
10	FW	GHA	Kwesi Appiah (loan return to (England) Crystal Palace)
21	MF	NOR	Herman Kleppa (on loan to (Norway) Vidar)
23	FW	NIR	Robin Shroot (loan return to (Norway) Hødd)
30	FW	NOR	Stian Michalsen (on loan to (Sweden) Ljungskile)
—	FW	NGR	Aniekpeno Udo (on loan to (Sweden) Ljungskile)

== Competitions ==
=== Eliteserien ===
==== League table ====
Pos	Team	Pld	W	D	L	GF	GA	GD	Pts	Qualification or relegation
12	Lillestrøm	30	10	7	13	40	43	−3	37	Qualification for the Europa League second qualifying round (Note: Lillestrøm qualified for the Europa League second qualifying round as winners of the 2017 Norwegian Cup.)
13	Sandefjord	30	11	3	16	38	51	−13	36	
14	Sogndal (R)	30	8	8	14	38	48	−10	32	Qualification for the relegation play-offs
15	Aalesund (R)	30	8	8	14	38	50	−12	32	Relegation to First Division
16	Viking (R)	30	6	6	18	33	57	−24	24	Relegation to First Division

Source: Football Association of Norway (in Norwegian), Soccerway
Rules for classification: 1) Points; 2) Goal difference; 3) Goals scored; 4) Head-to-head points; 5) Head-to-head goal difference; 6) Head-to-head away goals scored (only if between two teams); 7) Head-to-head goals scored; 8) Play-off (only used to decide champions or relegation).
(R) Relegated

==== Results summary ====
Overall								Home						Away					
Pld	W	D	L	GF	GA	GD	Pts	W	D	L	GF	GA	GD	W	D	L	GF	GA	GD
30	6	6	18	33	57	−24	24	4	3	8	20	28	−8	2	3	10	13	29	−16

Last updated: 26 November 2017.
Source: see below

==== Results by round ====
Round	1	2	3	4	5	6	7	8	9	10	11	12	13	14	15	16	17	18	19	20	21	22	23	24	25	26	27	28	29	30
Ground	A	H	A	H	H	A	H	A	H	A	A	H	A	H	A	H	A	H	A	H	A	H	A	H	A	H	A	H	A	H
Result	L	L	L	L	W	D	L	L	L	D	L	W	L	D	L	D	W	D	D	L	L	L	L	L	W	L	L	W	L	W
Position	12	13	16	16	14	15	16	16	16	16	16	16	16	16	16	16	16	15	15	16	16	16	16	16	16	16	16	16	16	16

Updated to match(es) played on 26 November 2017. Source: see below
A = Away; H = Home; W = Win; D = Draw; L = Loss

==== Matches ====
3 April 2017 1	Vålerenga	1–0	Viking	Oslo
19:00 CEST (UTC+2)	Finne 53'	Report		Stadium: Ullevaal Stadion; Attendance: 8,559; Referee: Dag Vidar Hafsås

6 April 2017 2	Viking	1–2	Tromsø	Stavanger
19:00 CEST (UTC+2)	Ernemann (yellow card) 56'; Ryerson 58'; Haugen (yellow card) 79'	Report	Ledger 6' (o.g.); Gundersen (yellow card) 21'; Landu-Landu (yellow card) 79'; Åsen 90'	Stadium: Viking Stadion; Attendance: 6,321; Referee: Kristoffer Hagenes

9 April 2017 3	Sarpsborg 08	3–0	Viking	Sarpsborg
18:00 CEST (UTC+2)	Trondsen 2'; Østli 56'; Mortensen 68'	Report	Shroot (yellow card) 19'; Mets (yellow card) 77'	Stadium: Sarpsborg Stadion; Attendance: 4,230; Referee: Ola Hobber Nilsen

17 April 2017 4	Viking	0–1	Rosenborg	Stavanger
20:00 CEST (UTC+2)	Ryerson (yellow card) 36'; Haugen (yellow card) 84'	Report	Helland 9'; Bendtner (yellow card) 45'; Jensen (yellow card) 53'; Reginiussen (yellow card) 78'	Stadium: Viking Stadion; Attendance: 6,804; Referee: Martin Lundby

23 April 2017 5	Viking	3–0	Odd	Stavanger
18:00 CEST (UTC+2)	Adegbenro 27'; Mets (yellow card) 54'; Bringaker 58'; Danielsen 62' (pen.)	Report	Ruud (yellow card) 41'	Stadium: Viking Stadion; Attendance: 6,914; Referee: Trygve Kjensli

29 April 2017 6	Brann	1–1	Viking	Bergen
18:00 CEST (UTC+2)	Haugen 22'; Nilsen (yellow card) 67'; Barmen (yellow card) 77'	Report	Adegbenro (yellow card) 64' (goal) 90+3'; Ryerson (yellow card) 67'	Stadium: Brann Stadion; Attendance: 12,613; Referee: Ola Hobber Nilsen

7 May 2017 7	Viking	0–2	Sandefjord	Stavanger
18:00 CEST (UTC+2)	Adegbenro (yellow card) 55'	Report	Kane (yellow card) 43'; Storbæk (yellow card) 45' (goal) 71'; Kurtovic (yellow card) 62'; Morer 69'	Stadium: Viking Stadion; Attendance: 7,261; Referee: Rohit Saggi

13 May 2017 8	Sogndal	4–0	Viking	Sogndalsfjøra
18:00 CEST (UTC+2)	Koomson 1', 38', 69' (pen.); Ramsland (yellow card) 33' (goal) 87'; Grodås (yellow card) 56'	Report	Austbø (yellow card) 68'	Stadium: Fosshaugane Campus; Attendance: 2,512; Referee: Kai Erik Steen

16 May 2017 9	Viking	1–2	Aalesund	Stavanger
18:00 CEST (UTC+2)	Hoff 11' (o.g.)	Report	Abdellaoue 28' (pen.); Veldwijk (yellow card) 30'; Gyasi 87'; Lie (yellow card) 90+2'	Stadium: Viking Stadion; Attendance: 8,431; Referee: Ola Hobber Nilsen

22 May 2017 10	Stabæk	1–1	Viking	Bærum
19:00 CEST (UTC+2)	Gyasi (yellow card) 84'; Omoijuanfo 90+5'	Report	Appiah 41'; Sale (yellow card) 58'; Ernemann (yellow card) 81'	Stadium: Nadderud Stadion; Attendance: 3,644; Referee: Tore Hansen

29 May 2017 11	Strømsgodset	4–2	Viking	Drammen
19:00 CEST (UTC+2)	Andersen 10' (yellow card) 79'; Glesnes 32'; Jradi 50', 53'; Sivodedov (yellow card) 58'; Vilsvik (yellow card) 70'	Report	Danielsen (yellow card) 60'; Bytyqi 66'; Adegbenro 80'	Stadium: Marienlyst Stadion; Attendance: 5,652; Referee: Espen Eskås

4 June 2017 12	Viking	2–1	Kristiansund	Stavanger
18:00 CEST (UTC+2)	Adegbenro (yellow card) 3'; Appiah 55' (pen.); Pedersen 90+5' (yellow card) 90+5'	Report	Ulvestad (yellow card) 22'; Mendy 62'; Baranov (yellow card) 79'; McDermott (yellow card) 90+2'	Stadium: Viking Stadion; Attendance: 7,261; Referee: Kristoffer Hagenes

18 June 2017 13	Lillestrøm	1–0	Viking	Lillestrøm
18:00 CEST (UTC+2)	Knudtzon (yellow card) 44'; Melgalvis 90+3'	Report	Ryerson (yellow card) 59'	Stadium: Åråsen Stadion; Attendance: 5,714; Referee: Martin Lundby

25 June 2017 14	Viking	1–1	Haugesund	Stavanger
20:00 CEST (UTC+2)	Appiah 29'; Martinsen (yellow card) 32'; Sale (yellow card) 64'; Ernemann (yellow card) 83'	Report	Abdi (yellow card) 39'; Hajradinović (yellow card) 43'; Knudsen (yellow card) 80'; Skjerve 88' (yellow card) 90+3'	Stadium: Viking Stadion; Attendance: 8,234; Referee: Rohit Saggi

2 July 2017 15	Molde	3–2	Viking	Molde
18:00 CEST (UTC+2)	Strand 5'; Sigurðarson 30' (pen.); Amang (yellow card) 82' (yellow-red card) 90+5' (goal) 90+4'; Hussain (yellow card) 83'	Report	Martinsen (yellow card) 29'; Ryerson (yellow card) 54'; Bringaker 72' (yellow card) 90+1'; Haugen 84'; Sale (yellow card) 90+1'	Stadium: Aker Stadion; Attendance: 7,831; Referee: Espen Eskås

9 July 2017 16	Viking	1–1	Sogndal	Stavanger
18:00 CEST (UTC+2)	Mets (yellow card) 53'; Martinsen 66'; Danielsen (yellow card) 90+3'	Report	Steiring (yellow card) 40'; Ramsland 67'; Fredriksen (yellow card) 69'	Stadium: Viking Stadion; Attendance: 7,238; Referee: Dag Vidar Hafsås

16 July 2017 17	Odd	0–2	Viking	Skien
18:00 CEST (UTC+2)	Zekhnini (yellow card) 61'; Diouf (yellow card) 71'	Report	Adegbenro 6', 24'	Stadium: Skagerak Arena; Attendance: 6,780; Referee: Kristoffer Hagenes

6 August 2017 18	Viking	2–2	Lillestrøm	Stavanger
18:00 CEST (UTC+2)	Adegbenro 60'; Høiland 68'	Report	Krogstad 19' (pen.); Haakenstad 44'; Origi (yellow card) 66'	Stadium: Viking Stadion; Attendance: 8,052; Referee: Tommy Skjerven

13 August 2017 19	Aalesund	1–1	Viking	Ålesund
18:00 CEST (UTC+2)	Grétarsson (yellow card) 80'; Riise (yellow card) 88'; Papazoglou 90+3'	Report	Høiland 12'; Jenkins (yellow card) 31'; Martinsen (yellow card) 51'; Adegbenro (yellow card) 56'	Stadium: Color Line Stadion; Attendance: 5,480; Referee: Kristoffer Hagenes

20 August 2017 20	Viking	2–4	Brann	Stavanger
20:00 CEST (UTC+2)	Danielsen (yellow card) 18'; Høiland 39' (pen.); Ryerson 61'; Cruz (yellow card) 90'	Report	Vega 28'; Skaanes 63'; Haugen 69'; Larsen 90'	Stadium: Viking Stadion; Attendance: 9,838; Referee: Tore Hansen

10 September 2017 21	Sandefjord	3–1	Viking	Sandefjord
18:00 CEST (UTC+2)	Grossmüller 18', 28'; Storbæk (yellow card) 23'; Kastrati 59' (pen.); Hansen (yellow card) 82'	Report	Guessan 14'; Gregov (yellow card) 16' (yellow-red card) 58'; Høiland (yellow card) 23'; Ryerson (yellow card) 49'; Green (yellow card) 73'	Stadium: Komplett Arena; Attendance: 3,159; Referee: Sigurd Kringstad

17 September 2017 22	Viking	2–3	Molde	Stavanger
18:00 CEST (UTC+2)	Sarr 2' (o.g.); Cruz (red card) 11'; Jenkins (yellow card) 45'; Høiland 77'	Report	Sigurðarson 13' (pen.); Ellingsen 33'; Normann (yellow card) 60'; Haaland 80'; Telo (yellow card) 90+2'	Stadium: Viking Stadion; Attendance: 6,737; Referee: Martin Lundby

23 September 2017 23	Haugesund	2–1	Viking	Haugesund
18:00 CEST (UTC+2)	Kovačević (yellow card) 45'; Stølås 78' (yellow card) 80'; Skjerve 90+5'	Report	Høiland (yellow card) 45'; Haugen 45+1' (yellow card) 80'; Green (yellow card) 90+6'	Stadium: Haugesund Stadion; Attendance: 5,919; Referee: Kai Erik Steen

1 October 2017 24	Viking	0–1	Strømsgodset	Stavanger
18:00 CEST (UTC+2)	Jenkins (yellow card) 71'; Green (yellow card) 83'	Report	Jradi 31'; Høibråten (yellow card) 33'; Tokstad (yellow card) 50'; Nguen (yellow card) 71'	Stadium: Viking Stadion; Attendance: 6,230; Referee: Espen Eskås

15 October 2017 25	Kristiansund	0–2	Viking	Kristiansund
18:00 CEST (UTC+2)	Coly (yellow card) 25' (yellow-red card) 67'	Report	Ryerson 15'; Danielsen (yellow card) 25'; Ernemann (yellow card) 28'; Haugen 62'	Stadium: Kristiansund Stadion; Attendance: 3,771; Referee: Kristoffer Hagenes

22 October 2017 26	Viking	1–7	Vålerenga	Stavanger
18:00 CEST (UTC+2)	Haugen (yellow card) 64'; Danielsen (yellow card) 70' (yellow-red card) 86'; Nordvik 74'; Jenkins (yellow card) 85'	Report	Stengel 12', 84' (yellow card) 37'; Juklerød 15', 35', 78'; Jääger 28'; Friðjónsson 54'	Stadium: Viking Stadion; Attendance: 7,760; Referee: Tore Hansen

29 October 2017 27	Tromsø	3–0	Viking	Tromsø
18:00 CET (UTC+1)	Wangberg 30'; Lehne Olsen 43', 73'	Report	Martinsen (yellow card) 42' (yellow-red card) 77'; Green (yellow card) 68'; Wichne (yellow card) 72'	Stadium: Alfheim Stadion; Attendance: 3,464; Referee: Rohit Saggi

5 November 2017 28	Viking	2–1	Sarpsborg 08	Stavanger
18:00 CET (UTC+1)	Green 22' (yellow card) 54'; Bytyqi (yellow card) 68'; Torsteinbø 88'; Ryerson (yellow card) 90+1'	Report	Mortensen 17'; Poulsen (yellow card) 90+2'	Stadium: Viking Stadion; Attendance: 7,467; Referee: Kai Erik Steen

19 November 2017 29	Rosenborg	2–0	Viking	Trondheim
18:00 CET (UTC+1)	Bendtner 8'; Trondsen 40'	Report		Stadium: Lerkendal Stadion; Attendance: 16,834; Referee: Ola Hobber Nilsen

26 November 2017 30	Viking	2–0	Stabæk	Stavanger
18:00 CET (UTC+1)	Sale (yellow card) 9'; Bringaker 25', 51'; Jenkins (yellow card) 27'; Gregov (yellow card) 90+2'	Report	Moe (yellow card) 57'; Tao (yellow card) 84'	Stadium: Viking Stadion; Attendance: 6,157; Referee: Tommy Skjerven

=== Norwegian Cup ===
26 April 2017 First round	Riska	1–4	Viking	Sandnes
18:00 CEST (UTC+2)	Myhre 64'	Report	Haugen 37'; Michalsen 48'; Pedersen 54'; Shroot 79'	Stadium: Riska stadion Attendance: 1,200; Referee: Steinar Hauge

25 May 2017 Second round	Egersund	3–1	Viking	Egersund
18:00 CEST (UTC+2)	Sumareh 18'; Sleveland 62'; Madsen (yellow card) 70'; Larsen 90+2'	Report	Sale (red card) 34'; Bringaker 50'; Kronberg (yellow card) 80'	Stadium: Idrettsparken; Attendance: 1,357; Referee: Jan Morten Tennøy

== Squad statistics ==
As of match played 26 November 2017

=== Appearances and goals ===
No.	Pos	Nat	Player	Total		Eliteserien		Norwegian Cup	
No.	Pos	Nat	Player	Apps	Goals	Apps	Goals	Apps	Goals
Goalkeepers
1	GK	(Norway) NOR	Iven Austbø	24	0	24	0	0	0
15	GK	(Norway) NOR	Amund Wichne	8	0	6	0	2	0
Defenders
2	DF	(Norway) NOR	Rasmus Martinsen	17	1	15	1	1+1	0
3	DF	(Norway) NOR	Andreas Nordvik	8	1	8	1	0	0
4	DF	(Spain) ESP	José Cruz	5	0	5	0	0	0
13	DF	(Croatia) CRO	Šime Gregov	10	0	7+3	0	0	0
22	DF	(Denmark) DEN	Claes Kronberg	28	0	26	0	1+1	0
28	DF	(Norway) NOR	Kristoffer Haugen	29	4	27	3	2	1
45	DF	(Norway) NOR	Adrian Pereira	2	0	0+1	0	0+1	0
Midfielders
7	MF	(England) ENG	George Green	7	1	2+5	1	0	0
8	MF	(England) ENG	Ross Jenkins	12	0	10+2	0	0	0
9	MF	(Norway) NOR	Fredrik Torsteinbø	10	1	7+3	1	0	0
14	MF	(Norway) NOR	André Danielsen	30	1	28	1	2	0
17	MF	(Denmark) DEN	Steffen Ernemann	20	0	17+3	0	0	0
18	MF	(Norway) NOR	Julian Ryerson	30	3	28	3	1+1	0
19	MF	(Norway) NOR	Michael Haukås	17	0	6+9	0	2	0
26	MF	(Norway) NOR	Tore André Sørås	0	0	0	0	0	0
Forwards
10	FW	(Norway) NOR	Tommy Høiland	13	4	13	4	0	0
11	FW	(Norway) NOR	Zymer Bytyqi	25	1	17+8	1	0	0
20	FW	(Norway) NOR	Tor André Skimmeland Aasheim	10	0	5+4	0	1	0
25	FW	(Nigeria) NGR	Usman Sale	11	0	8+2	0	1	0
27	FW	(Norway) NOR	Mathias Bringaker	25	5	12+12	4	1	1
42	FW	(Norway) NOR	Jonas Pereira	2	0	0+2	0	0	0
99	FW	(Ivory Coast) CIV	Ghislain Guessan	3	1	3	1	0	0
Players out on loan
21	MF	(Norway) NOR	Herman Kleppa	1	0	0	0	1	0
30	FW	(Norway) NOR	Stian Michalsen	7	1	1+5	0	1	1
	DF	(Norway) NOR	Erik Steen	0	0	0	0	0	0
	FW	(Nigeria) NGR	Aniekpeno Udo	0	0	0	0	0	0
Players who have made an appearance or had a squad number this season but have left the club
4	DF	(England) ENG	Michael Ledger	14	0	13	0	1	0
6	DF	(Estonia) EST	Karol Mets	18	0	16	0	2	0
7	MF	(Nigeria) NGR	Samuel Adegbenro	16	6	15	6	0+1	0
9	FW	(Denmark) DEN	Patrick Pedersen	8	2	0+6	1	1+1	1
10	FW	(Ghana) GHA	Kwesi Appiah	12	3	10+2	3	0	0
23	FW	(Northern Ireland) NIR	Robin Shroot	8	1	2+4	0	2	1

=== Goal scorers ===
Place	Position	Nation	Number	Name	Eliteserien	Norwegian Cup	Total
1	MF	(Nigeria)	7	Samuel Adegbenro	6	0	6
2	FW	(Norway)	27	Mathias Bringaker	4	1	5
3	FW	(Norway)	10	Tommy Høiland	4	0	4
3	DF	(Norway)	28	Kristoffer Haugen	3	1	4
5	FW	(Ghana)	10	Kwesi Appiah	3	0	3
5	MF	(Norway)	18	Julian Ryerson	3	0	3
7	FW	(Denmark)	9	Patrick Pedersen	1	1	2
7				Own goal	2	0	2
9	DF	(Norway)	2	Rasmus Martinsen	1	0	1
9	DF	(Norway)	3	Andreas Nordvik	1	0	1
9	MF	(England)	7	George Green	1	0	1
9	MF	(Norway)	9	Fredrik Torsteinbø	1	0	1
9	FW	(Norway)	11	Zymer Bytyqi	1	0	1
9	MF	(Norway)	14	André Danielsen	1	0	1
9	FW	(Northern Ireland)	23	Robin Shroot	0	1	1
9	FW	(Norway)	30	Stian Michalsen	0	1	1
9	FW	(Ivory Coast)	99	Ghislain Guessan	1	0	1
				TOTALS	33	5	38

=== Disciplinary record ===
Number	Nation	Position	Name	Eliteserien		Norwegian Cup		Total	
Number	Nation	Position	Name	Yellow card	Red card	Yellow card	Red card	Yellow card	Red card
1	(Norway)	GK	Iven Austbø	1	0	0	0	1	0
2	(Norway)	DF	Rasmus Martinsen	3	1	0	0	3	1
4	(Spain)	DF	José Cruz	0	1	0	0	0	1
8	(England)	MF	Ross Jenkins	5	0	0	0	5	0
10	(Norway)	FW	Tommy Høiland	2	0	0	0	2	0
11	(Norway)	FW	Zymer Bytyqi	1	0	0	0	1	0
13	(Croatia)	DF	Šime Gregov	1	1	0	0	1	1
14	(Norway)	MF	André Danielsen	4	1	0	0	4	1
15	(Norway)	GK	Amund Wichne	1	0	0	0	1	0
17	(Denmark)	MF	Steffen Ernemann	4	0	0	0	4	0
18	(Norway)	MF	Julian Ryerson	6	0	0	0	6	0
22	(Denmark)	DF	Claes Kronberg	0	0	1	0	1	0
25	(Nigeria)	FW	Usman Sale	4	0	0	1	4	1
27	(Norway)	FW	Mathias Bringaker	1	0	0	0	1	0
28	(Norway)	DF	Kristoffer Haugen	4	0	0	0	4	0
Players who left during the season:
6	(Estonia)	DF	Karol Mets	3	0	0	0	3	0
7	(England)	MF	George Green	5	0	0	0	5	0
7	(Nigeria)	FW	Samuel Adegbenro	4	0	0	0	4	0
9	(Denmark)	FW	Patrick Pedersen	1	0	0	0	1	0
23	(Northern Ireland)	FW	Robin Shroot	1	0	0	0	1	0
			TOTALS	51	4	1	1	52	5
