= Michael Ledger =

English footballer

Personal information
- Full name: Michael Ledger
- Date of birth: 15 August 1997 (age 29)
- Place of birth: Consett, England
- Height: 1.86 m (6 ft 1 in)
- Position: Centre-back

Team information
- Current team: Consett

Youth career
- 2005–2015: Sunderland

Senior career*
Years	Team	Apps	(Gls)
2015–2018	Sunderland	0	(0)
2017	→ Viking (loan)	13	(0)
2017–2018	→ Hartlepool United (loan)	11	(0)
2018–2019	Notodden	47	(2)
2020	Queen of the South	5	(0)
2020–2022	Greenock Morton	47	(1)
2022–2025	Spennymoor Town	95	(0)
2025–	Consett	39	(0)
- * Club domestic league appearances and goals as of 22:28, 22 May 2026 (UTC)

Michael Ledger (born 15 August 1997) is an English footballer who plays as a centre-back for Pitching Inn Northern Premier League Division One East club Consett A.F.C. He has previously played for Sunderland, Notodden, Queen of the South, Greenock Morton, and Spennymoor Town, and on loan at Viking and Hartlepool United.

== Career ==
=== Sunderland ===
Born in Consett, Ledger joined the Sunderland Academy at the age of seven. After progressing through the youth system at Sunderland, Ledger was captain for the under-18 team and his impressive displays resulted in him signing his first professional contract. Soon after that he was promoted to the development squad in June 2015.

Whilst progressing through the development squad at Sunderland, Ledger started to feature during the 2016-17 season, as he played on four occasions in the EFL Trophy campaign. On 2 January 2017, Ledger was called up to the first-team squad for the first time, although he was an unused substitute in the 2–2 draw versus Liverpool. After his loan spell with Viking ended, Ledger signed a full-time contract with the Black Cats in June 2017.

=== Loan Spells ===
In November 2016, Ledger was sent out on loan to Norwegian club Viking until their close season in February 2017 and debuted for the club on 3 April 2017, in a 1–0 defeat away to Vålerenga. He then claimed an assist for Samuel Adegbenro in a 4–2 defeat versus Strømsgodset on 29 May 2017. During his time at the club Ledger started in every match for Viking, with his final appearance coming on 18 June 2017, in a 1–0 defeat against Lillestrøm.

Despite interest from clubs in the Bundesliga, Ledger was loaned out to Hartlepool United on 31 August 2017, until the end of the season, debuting in a 3–1 win versus Maidstone United on 14 September 2017. After suffering an injury set-back in late September 2017, Ledger remained in the first-team, despite competition from other squad players.

=== Notodden FK ===
On 13 March 2018, Ledger signed for Notodden FK in Norway on a two-year contract.

=== Queen of the South ===
On 31 January 2020, Ledger signed for Dumfries club Queen of the South until 30 June 2020.

=== Greenock Morton ===
On 25 September 2020, Ledger signed for Scottish Championship side Greenock Morton.

=== Spennymoor Town ===
On 20 August 2022, Ledger moved back to England when he signed for National League North side Spennymoor Town.

=== Consett A.F.C ===
On 17 August 2025, Ledger signed for Pitching Inn Northern Premier League Division One East side Consett A.F.C

== Career statistics ==
As of 25 April 2026

Appearances and goals by club, season and competition
Club	Season	League			National Cup		League Cup		Other		Total	
Club	Season	Division	Apps	Goals	Apps	Goals	Apps	Goals	Apps	Goals	Apps	Goals
Sunderland	2016–17	Premier League	0	0	0	0	0	0	4 (Note: Appearances for Sunderland under-23s in the EFL Trophy)	0	4	0
Sunderland	2017–18	Premier League	0	0	0	0	0	0	0	0	0	0
Sunderland	Total		0	0	0	0	0	0	4	0	4	0
Viking (loan)	2017	Eliteserien	13	0	1	0	—		0	0	14	0
Hartlepool United (loan)	2017–18	National League	11	0	1	0	0	0	0	0	12	0
Notodden	2018	1. divisjon	21	0	1	0	—		0	0	22	0
Notodden	2019	1. divisjon	23	1	1	1	—		2 (Note: Appearances in the 2019 1. divisjon relegation play-offs)	0	26	2
Notodden	Total		44	1	2	1	—		2	0	48	2
Queen of the South	2019–20	Scottish Championship	5	0	0	0	0	0	0	0	5	0
Greenock Morton	2020–21	Scottish Championship	22	0	3	0	3	0	3	0	31	0
Greenock Morton	2021–22	Scottish Championship	25	1	2	0	3	0	3	0	33	1
Greenock Morton	Total		47	1	5	0	6	0	6	0	64	1
Spennymoor Town	2022–23	National League North	24	0	1	0	0	0	2	0	27	0
Spennymoor Town	2023–24	National League North	29	0	0	0	0	0	0	0	29	0
Spennymoor Town	2024–25	National League North	42	0	1	0	0	0	7	0	50	0
Spennymoor Town	Total		95	0	2	0	0	0	9	0	106	0
Consett	2025–26	NPL Division One East	39	0	0	0	0	0	3	0	42	0
Career total			254	3	11	1	6	0	24	0	295	4

== Honours ==
Spennymoor Town

- FA Trophy runner-up: 2024–25

== Personal life ==
Ledger is a Sunderland supporter.
