= Samuel Adegbenro =

Nigerian footballer (born 1995)

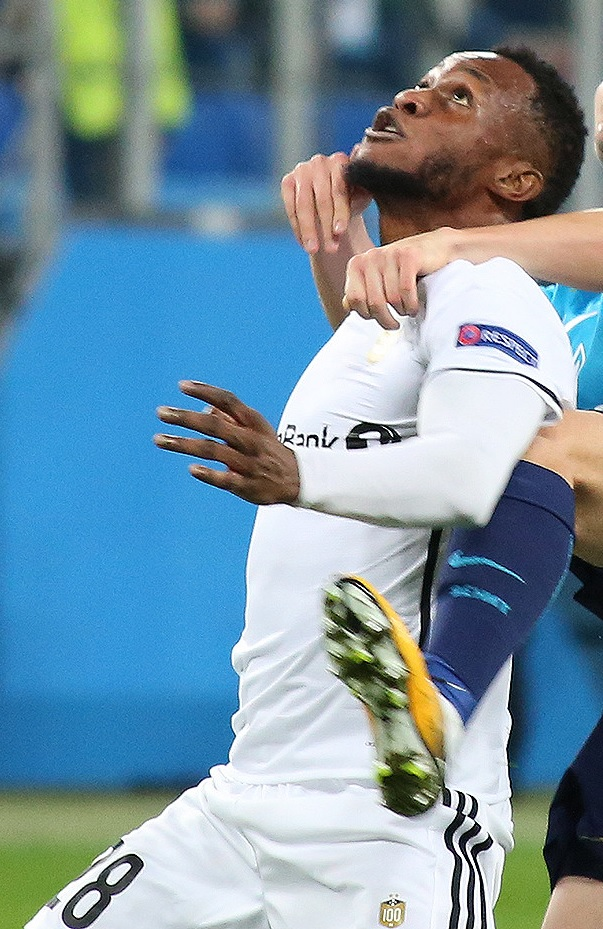
- Adegbenro with Rosenborg in 2017

Personal information
- Full name: Samuel Adeniyi Adegbenro
- Date of birth: 3 December 1995 (age 30)
- Place of birth: Osogbo, Nigeria
- Height: 1.78 m (5 ft 10 in)
- Positions: Forward; winger

Team information
- Current team: Egersund
- Number: 19

Youth career
- Prime
- Kwara United

Senior career*
Years	Team	Apps	(Gls)
2015–2017	Viking	67	(14)
2017–2020	Rosenborg	49	(10)
2021	IFK Norrköping	30	(17)
2022–2024	Beijing Guoan	41	(7)
2023	→ Viking (loan)	11	(4)
2025–	Egersund	10	(0)
- * Club domestic league appearances and goals as of 8 November 2025

Samuel Adeniyi Adegbenro (born 3 December 1995) is a Nigerian professional footballer who plays as a winger for Egersund.

A fast and skillful player able to operate at both flanks, Adegbenro can play in the center as well; as an attacking midfielder or striker. At Rosenborg, he mainly played as a left winger in a 4-3-3 formation.

== Club career ==
=== Nigeria ===
Adegbenro was born in Nigeria. He started his career at local team Prime before switching to Kwara United.

Adegbenro got ranked as the club's most valuable player by Kwara United general manager, Alhaji Haruna Maigidasanma, after the first half of the 2014 season.

=== Viking ===
After impressing at trials earlier that winter, Adegbenro moved to Norwegian Eliteserien club Viking alongside fellow Nigerian, Suleiman Abdullahi, signing a four-year contract 5 February 2015.

Adegbenro made his debut for Viking on 6 April 2015 against Mjøndalen; they lost the game, 1–0. Adegbenro scored his first goal in Eliteserien against Molde at home, a match which Viking won by 2–1. Adegbenro, accompanied by Suleiman Abdullahi, made a great impact to the team throughout the 2015 season. Making 24 appearances this season, Adegbenro scored 5 goals and assisted another 5.

He was awarded William Danielsen's memory goblet for his debut season at Viking's annual meeting on 15 March 2016.

The 2016 season resulted in 28 appearances, 3 goals and 1 assist.

=== Rosenborg ===
On 15 August 2017, Adegbenro moved to Rosenborg for around 15 million NOK, signing a four-and-a-half-year contract. Two days later he scored on his debut after coming off the bench securing Rosenborg a 1–0 away win versus Ajax in the first leg of the 2017–18 UEFA Europa League play-off round. In the second leg a week later, Adegbenro helped Rosenborg reach the 2017–18 UEFA Europa League group stage by scoring twice in a 3–2 win at home, making it 4–2 on aggregate.

=== IFK Norrköping ===
On 13 January 2021, Adegbenro moved to IFK Norrköping. On 1 March 2022, Norrköping announced that the club reached the agreement with an unidentified Chinese club for Adegbenro's transfer and that further details of the transfer would be announced when the transfer window opens in China in mid-March. There was no additional announcement made in mid-March. On 6 April 2022, Fotbollskanalen Europa reported that the new club is Beijing Guoan and Adegbenro is in China in COVID-19 quarantine, while there was no official confirmation for the transfer from IFK Norrköping or Beijing Guoan at that time.

=== Beijing Guoan ===
On 15 April 2022, Adegbenro joined Chinese Super League club Beijing Guoan. On 29 October 2022, Adegbenro scored his first 2 goals for Guoan in a 4–1 win against Guangzhou F.C.

==== Return to Viking (loan) ====
On 30 August 2023, Adegbenro returned to Viking on loan until the end of the 2023 season. On 24 September 2023, he scored a goal against Sandefjord in a 4–3 win.

== Career statistics ==
As of match played 8 November 2025

Appearances and goals by club, season and competition
Club	Season	League			National cup		Continental		Total	
Club	Season	Division	Apps	Goals	Apps	Goals	Apps	Goals	Apps	Goals
Viking	2015	Eliteserien	24	5	4	2	—		28	7
Viking	2016	Eliteserien	28	3	3	1	—		31	4
Viking	2017	Eliteserien	15	6	1	0	—		16	6
Viking	Total		67	14	8	3	—		75	17
Rosenborg	2017	Eliteserien	10	2	1	0	8	3	19	5
Rosenborg	2018	Eliteserien	7	3	2	0	4	1	13	4
Rosenborg	2019	Eliteserien	20	5	3	1	12	1	35	7
Rosenborg	2020	Eliteserien	12	0	—		3	0	15	0
Rosenborg	Total		49	10	6	1	27	5	82	16
Norrköping	2021	Allsvenskan	30	17	4	2	—		34	19
Beijing Guoan	2022	Chinese Super League	14	3	0	0	—		14	3
Beijing Guoan	2023	Chinese Super League	12	1	0	0	—		12	1
Beijing Guoan	2024	Chinese Super League	15	3	3	0	—		18	3
Beijing Guoan	Total		41	7	44	0	—		44	7
Viking (loan)	2023	Eliteserien	11	4	—		—		11	4
Egersund	2025	1. divisjon	10	0	2	0	—		12	0
Career total			193	49	20	6	27	5	240	60

== Honours ==
Individual

- Allsvenskan Top goalscorer: 2021
- Allsvenskan Forward of the Year: 2021
