= Marco Priis Jørgensen =

Danish footballer (born 1991)

Personal information
- Date of birth: 2 June 1991 (age 35)
- Place of birth: Denmark
- Height: 1.90 m (6 ft 3 in)
- Position: Goalkeeper

Team information
- Current team: Eik Tønsberg
- Number: 1

Youth career
- B.93
- Hvidovre

Senior career*
Years	Team	Apps	(Gls)
2010–2011	Long Island RR	0	(0)
2011	HB Køge	0	(0)
2011–2014	Long Island RR	0	(0)
2014–2015	Midtjylland	0	(0)
2015–2017	Mjøndalen	32	(0)
2017	→ Arendal (loan)	7	(0)
2018–2019	HamKam	2	(0)
2019–2020	Roskilde	0	(0)
2020–2021	Hødd	8	(0)
2022–2023	Brattvåg	49	(0)
2024–	Eik Tønsberg	28	(0)
- * Club domestic league appearances and goals as of 25 July 2025

Marco Priis Jørgensen (born 2 June 1991) is a Danish football goalkeeper who plays for Eik Tønsberg.

== Career ==
Jørgensen signed for HamKam on 12 March 2018. He left the club at the end of 2018, when his contract expired. However, in March 2019, he renewed his contract with the club.

On 19 July 2019, Jørgensen joined Danish 1st Division club FC Roskilde after a trial.
