= José Cruz (Spanish footballer) =

Spanish footballer (born 1988)

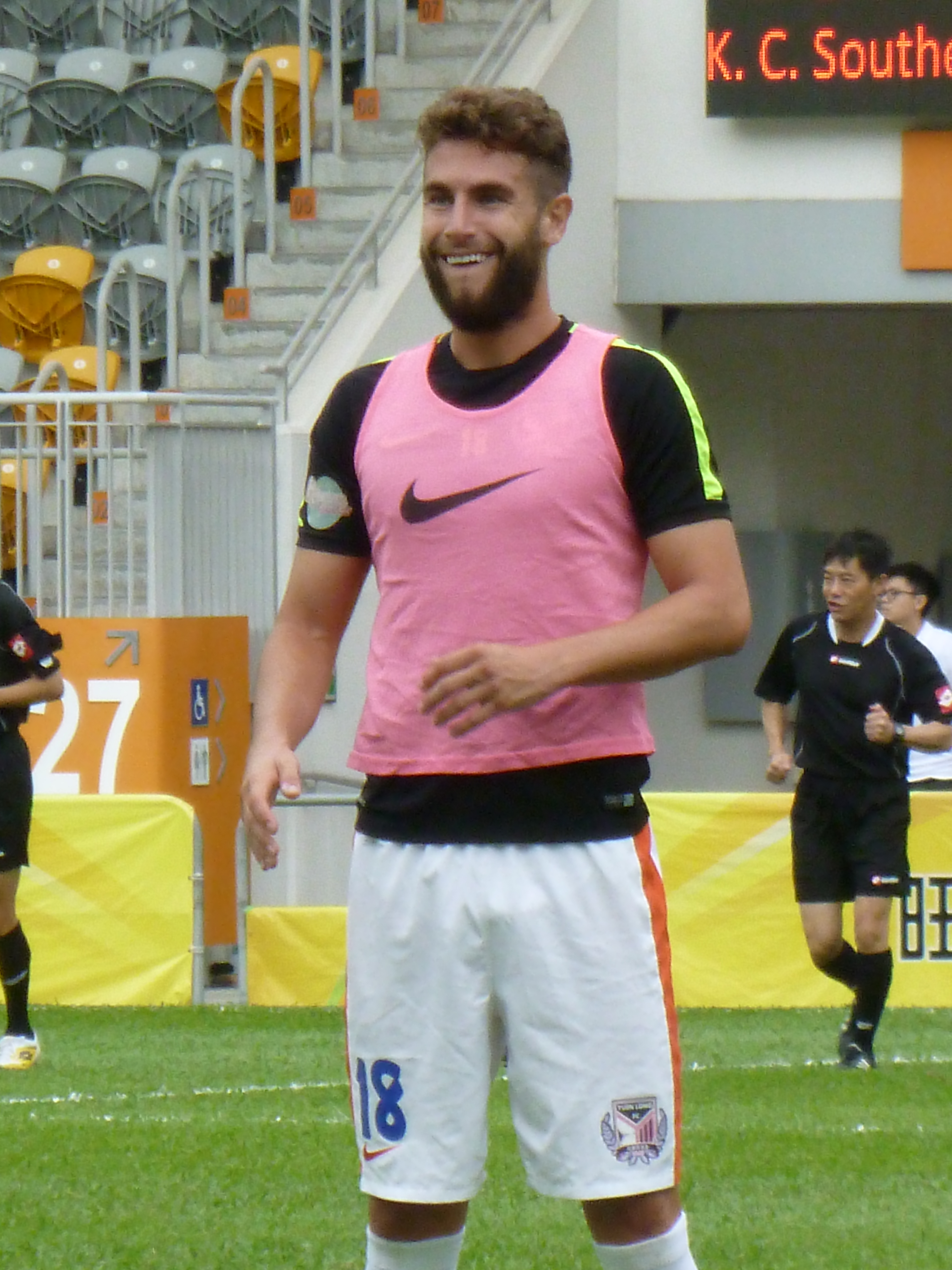

Personal information
- Full name: José Manuel Cruz Orozco
- Date of birth: 10 August 1988 (age 38)
- Place of birth: Córdoba, Spain
- Height: 1.85 m (6 ft 1 in)
- Position: Defender

Team information
- Current team: Ciudad de Lucena

Youth career
- Séneca
- 2006–2007: Real Madrid

Senior career*
Years	Team	Apps	(Gls)
2007–2010	Real Madrid C	97	(9)
2010–2012	Sporting B	56	(2)
2012–2013	Lucena	31	(4)
2013–2015	Jaén	47	(2)
2015–2016	Yuen Long	8	(1)
2016	Almería B	15	(2)
2016–2017	Racing Ferrol	34	(2)
2017	Viking	5	(0)
2018	Mérida	15	(0)
2018–2020	Marbella	33	(2)
2020–2021	Linares Deportivo	23	(1)
2021–2023	Córdoba	35	(0)
2023–2024	UCAM Murcia	42	(1)
2024–	Ciudad de Lucena	6	(0)
- * Club domestic league appearances and goals as of 13 October 2024

José Manuel Cruz Orozco (born 10 August 1988) is a Spanish footballer who plays as a defender for Ciudad de Lucena.

== Club career ==
Born in Córdoba, Andalusia, Cruz finished his formation with Real Madrid, then played his first three years as a senior with the C-team. On 15 July 2010 he signed with Sporting de Gijón, but only appeared officially for the reserves in Segunda División B.

In the 2012 summer, Cruz joined fellow league club Lucena CF. After only one season he penned a one-year deal with Real Jaén, freshly promoted to Segunda División.

On 18 August 2013, Cruz played his first game as a professional, starting in a 1–2 home loss against SD Eibar. He scored his first professional goal on 30 March of the following year, netting the last in a 1–1 home draw against Hércules CF.

On 27 July 2015, Cruz moved abroad for the first time in his career, joining Hong Kong club Yuen Long FC. The following January he returned to his native country, and represented UD Almería B and Racing de Ferrol in the following years.

On 28 July 2017, Cruz signed for Norwegian Eliteserien club Viking FK. He left the club after the 2017 season.

On 17 January 2018, Cruz returned to Spain, signing for Segunda División B club Mérida AD. Ahead of the 2018–19 season, he joined fellow Segunda División B club Marbella FC. After two seasons with Marbella, he signed for Linares Deportivo in September 2020.

== Club statistics ==
As of match played 15 May 2021

Club	Season	League			Cup		Other		Total	
Club	Season	Division	Apps	Goals	Apps	Goals	Apps	Goals	Apps	Goals
Sporting B	2010–11	Segunda División B	31	2	—		—		31	2
Sporting B	2011–12	Segunda División B	25	0	—		—		25	0
Sporting B	Total		56	2	—		—		56	2
Lucena	2012–13	Segunda División B	31	4	1	0	2 (Note: Appearance(s) in promotion play-offs)	0	34	4
Jaén	2013–14	Segunda División	12	1	1	0	—		13	1
Jaén	2014–15	Segunda División B	35	1	1	0	—		36	1
Jaén	Total		47	2	2	0	—		49	2
Yuen Long	2015–16	Hong Kong Premier League	8	1	2	0	—		10	1
Almería B	2015–16	Segunda División B	15	2	—		—		15	2
Racing Ferrol	2016–17	Segunda División B	34	2	2	0	—		36	2
Viking	2017	Eliteserien	5	0	0	0	—		5	0
Mérida	2017–18	Segunda División B	15	0	0	0	1 (Note: Appearance in relegation play-offs)	0	16	0
Marbella	2018–19	Segunda División B	23	2	1	0	—		24	2
Marbella	2019–20	Segunda División B	10	0	0	0	1	0	11	0
Marbella	Total		33	2	1	0	1	0	35	2
Linares Deportivo	2020–21	Segunda División B	22	1	2	0	1	0	25	1
Career total			266	16	10	0	5	0	281	16
