= Ross Jenkins (footballer, born 1990) =

English footballer

Personal information
- Full name: Ross Aden Jenkins
- Date of birth: 9 November 1990 (age 36)
- Place of birth: Watford, England
- Height: 6 ft 3 in (1.90 m)
- Position: Central midfielder

Team information
- Current team: Oxford City (manager)

Youth career
- 2007–2008: Watford

Senior career*
Years	Team	Apps	(Gls)
2008–2014	Watford	81	(2)
2012	→ Plymouth Argyle (loan)	2	(1)
2013	→ Barnet (loan)	5	(1)
2015–2016	Crawley Town	14	(0)
2016	Poli Timișoara	9	(1)
2017	Pirin Blagoevgrad	11	(0)
2017	Viking	12	(0)
2018	Hamilton Academical	11	(0)
Total		145	(5)

International career
2009	England U20	5	(0)

Managerial career
- 2022–2024: Oxford City
- 2024: Boreham Wood
- 2024–: Oxford City
- * Club domestic league appearances and goals

Ross Aden Jenkins (born 9 November 1990) is an English football manager and former player who played as a central midfielder. He currently manages National League North club Oxford City.

== Career ==
Jenkins was born in Watford and began a two-year academy scholarship with his hometown club in summer 2007. During the 2007–08 season he played regularly in the club's under-18 side, as well as appearing for the reserves. After appearing frequently for Watford's first team during the 2008 pre-season, he made his competitive debut on 12 August 2008 whilst still an academy scholar. Jenkins played the entire game as Watford beat League One side Bristol Rovers 1–0 in the League Cup. He remained in the club's League Cup team, playing full games against Darlington, West Ham United and Swansea City before Watford bowed out to Tottenham Hotspur in the quarter-final.

Jenkins made his league debut in the defeat at Barnsley on 15 November 2008 under the management of Malky Mackay, and retained his place in the team thereafter, scoring his first league goal in the 3–2 defeat at promotion contenders Birmingham City on 6 December. In 2009, Jenkins formed a midfield partnership with Jack Cork under manager Brendan Rodgers in which the team climbed to 13th place in the league by the end of the season. He made his 50th start for Watford on 20 October 2009 against Ipswich Town.

Jenkins then went on to represent England at U20 level, playing in a 5–0 win over Montenegro at The Hawthorns.

Jenkins signed for Plymouth Argyle on an initial one-month loan on 21 September. He scored on his debut in League Two as the club came from two goals behind to win 3–2 at Morecambe. After scoring his first goal, Jenkins said he determined to expect to score more goals at Plymouth. However, his time at Plymouth Argyle was short-lived and he returned to his parent club after suffering a groin injury. Jenkins joined Barnet on loan in March 2013, and made his debut when he played 90 minutes in a 4–1 home win over Morecambe. He scored his first goal for Barnet in a 3–2 defeat at Accrington Stanley on 16 March 2013. Jenkins made 5 appearances in total before returning to Watford.

After leaving Watford, Jenkins started training with Malky Mackay's Wigan Athletic at the beginning of the 2014–15 season.

On 17 September 2015, he joined Crawley Town. In January 2016, less than four months after joining Crawley, Jenkins cancelled his contract and moved to Romania to join Poli Timișoara.

In February 2017, Jenkins joined Bulgarian club Pirin Blagoevgrad, signing a 6-month contract. He left the club after his contract expired.

On 2 August 2017, Jenkins signed with Norwegian Eliteserien side Viking. He was released by Viking at the end of the 2017 Norwegian season, and signed for Scottish Premiership club Hamilton Academical in February 2018.

== Coaching career ==
Persistent injury led Jenkins to retire from professional football at the age of 28; he subsequently moved into a coaching role at non-League side Oxford City.

Following the departure of first-team manager David Oldfield to Weymouth in January 2022, Jenkins was placed in caretaker charge with the club sitting in fourth position in the table. On 9 March, Jenkins was appointed Head Coach on a permanent contract.

The 2022–23 season saw Jenkins guide Oxford to promotion to the fifth tier for the first time in the club's history, defeating St Albans City 4–0 in the play-off final. However, Oxford City suffered an immediate relegation back to the sixth tier in the following season. On 15 May 2024, the club confirmed Jenkins' departure.

On 15 May 2024, Jenkins was appointed manager of National League South club Boreham Wood. He left in September after eight games in charge, with Wood winless in four games.

On 27 September 2024, Jenkins returned to Oxford City, now in National League North, as manager.

== International career ==
Jenkins received his first call up to the England U20 squad on 7 August 2009. He started in their friendly against Montenegro a few days later at The Hawthorns which ended in a 5–0 victory.

== Personal life ==
Jenkins is the second player with his name to have played competitive football for Watford. He is no relation to the Ross Jenkins who played for Watford from 1972 to 1983, and was a two-time Watford Player of the Season.

== Career statistics ==
=== Club ===
Appearances and goals by club, season and competition
Club	Season	League			National Cup		League Cup		Other		Total	
Club	Season	Division	Apps	Goals	Apps	Goals	Apps	Goals	Apps	Goals	Apps	Goals
Watford	2008–09	Championship	29	1	3	0	0	0	0	0	32	1
Watford	2009–10	Championship	24	0	1	0	1	0	0	0	26	0
Watford	2010–11	Championship	19	1	1	0	2	0	0	0	22	1
Watford	2011–12	Championship	9	0	0	0	0	0	0	0	9	0
Watford	2012–13	Championship	0	0	0	0	1	0	0	0	1	0
Watford	Total		81	2	5	0	4	0	0	0	90	2
Plymouth Argyle (loan)	2012–13	League Two	2	1	0	0	0	0	0	0	2	1
Barnet (loan)	2012–13	League Two	5	1	0	0	0	0	0	0	5	1
Crawley Town	2015–16	League Two	14	0	0	0	0	0	0	0	14	0
Poli Timișoara	2015–16	Liga I	9	1	0	0	0	0	0	0	9	1
Pirin Blagoevgrad	2016–17	First Professional Football League	11	0	1	0	0	0	0	0	12	0
Viking	2017	Eliteserien	12	0	0	0	0	0	0	0	12	0
Hamilton Academical	2017–18	Scottish Premiership	11	0	0	0	0	0	0	0	11	0
Career total			145	5	6	0	4	0	0	0	155	5

== Managerial statistics ==
As of match played 19 September 2026

Managerial record by team and tenure
Team	From	To	Record					Ref.
Team	From	To	P	W	D	L	Win %	Ref.
Oxford City	18 January 2022	15 May 2024	127	47	31	49	37.0	
Boreham Wood	15 May 2024	12 September 2024	8	3	3	2	37.5	
Oxford City	27 September 2024	Present	103	39	25	39	37.9	
Total			238	89	59	90	37.4	—

== Honours ==
Manager

Oxford City

- National League South play-offs: 2023
