= George Green (footballer, born 1996) =

English footballer

Personal information
- Full name: George William Athelston Green
- Date of birth: 2 January 1996 (age 30)
- Place of birth: Dewsbury, England
- Height: 1.83 m (6 ft 0 in)
- Position: Attacking midfielder

Team information
- Current team: Thackley

Youth career
- 2003–2011: Bradford City
- 2011–2013: Everton

Senior career*
| Years | Team | Apps | (Gls) |
| 2013–2015 | Everton | 0 | (0) |
| 2015 | → Tranmere Rovers (loan) | 6 | (1) |
| 2015 | Oldham Athletic | 3 | (0) |
| 2015–2016 | Ossett Albion | 4 | (0) |
| 2016–2017 | Burnley | 0 | (0) |
| 2016 | → Kilmarnock (loan) | 4 | (0) |
| 2017 | → Salford City (loan) | 8 | (0) |
| 2017 | Viking | 7 | (1) |
| 2018 | Nuneaton Town | 14 | (2) |
| 2018–2019 | Chester | 12 | (0) |
| 2019–2020 | Boston United | 4 | (0) |
| 2019 | → Gainsborough Trinity (loan) | 3 | (0) |
| 2020–2022 | Ossett United | 22 | (2) |
| 2022 | Humber United | 6 | (4) |
| 2022–2023 | Frickley Athletic | 10 | (2) |
| 2023– | Thackley | 20 | (4) |

International career^{‡}
| 2012 | England U16 | 6 | (4) |
| 2012–2013 | England U17 | 7 | (2) |
| 2013 | England U18 | 3 | (2) |
- * Club domestic league appearances and goals as of 21:26, 18 March 2024 (UTC) ‡ National team caps and goals as of 13:21, 19 June 2015 (UTC)

George William Athelston Green (born 2 January 1996) is an English footballer who plays as an attacking midfielder.

Green began his career as a youth player with Bradford City, before being signed by Everton in 2011. After a loan spell with Tranmere Rovers, Green was released, and after short stints with Oldham Athletic and Ossett Albion, he signed for Burnley. Loan spells at Kilmarnock and Salford City preceded his release from Burnley in 2017, before signing with Norwegian club, Viking. Following his return to England, he has played in the non-league for Nuneaton Town, Chester, Boston United, and Gainsborough Trinity, and Ossett United.

While at Everton, Green was selected to represent England U16s, U17s and U18s

== Career ==
Green started as a youth player with Bradford City, before being signed by Everton in October 2011 for an initial fee of £300,000 that could have risen as high as £2 million and received a £45,000 signing-on fee. He joined the club's youth setup, and was a member of the side that won the 2014 U18 Premier League. He went on loan to Tranmere Rovers in March 2015. He made his Tranmere debut later that month, scoring an injury-time equaliser in a game against AFC Wimbledon.

On 10 June 2015, Green left Everton after nearly four years at the club without having made a senior appearance. His time at the club had been marred by alcohol and drug addiction, and he spent time at The Priory rehab.

Nine days later, Green agreed to join League One side Oldham Athletic on a two-year deal with an option of a third year, but voluntarily terminated the contract that November. On 8 November, Green signed for Ossett Albion, making his debut on 10 November against Mossley. He signed a six-month contract with Burnley in January 2016, after scoring a hat-trick in a trial match.

On 12 August 2016 Green joined Scottish Premiership club Kilmarnock on a six-month loan. On 28 January 2017, Green joined National League North side Salford City on loan until the end of the season. He made a total of eight appearances for Salford during the loan spell. Green was released by Burnley in June 2017. On 16 August 2017, Green signed for Viking in Norway, but on 21 November, his contract was terminated due to incidents off the pitch.

On 2 February 2018, Green signed for National League North side Nuneaton Town. On 17 July, Green signed for National League North side Chester on a one-year contract, with the option of a second-year extension. He was released by the club at the end of the season.

In June 2019, Green joined Boston United. In November he joined Gainsborough Trinity on a month's loan. On 9 June 2020, he moved to Ossett United. He combined his non-league career with training to be an electrician. In 2021, he had a six-week trial with Bulgarian team OFC Pirin Blagoevgrad. In 2022, after a short stint with Humber United, he signed for Frickley Athletic, and moved to Thackley in February 2023.

== International career ==
He has represented England at youth level, featuring in the 2013 UEFA European Under-17 Championship qualifying round, scoring against Estonia.

== Career statistics ==
As of match played 14 September 2019

Appearances and goals by club, season and competition
| Club | Season | League | | | National cup | | League cup | | Other | | Total | |
| Club | Season | Division | Apps | Goals | Apps | Goals | Apps | Goals | Apps | Goals | Apps | Goals |
|---|---|---|---|---|---|---|---|---|---|---|---|---|
| Everton | 2013–14 | Premier League | 0 | 0 | 0 | 0 | 0 | 0 | — | | 0 | 0 |
| Everton | 2014–15 | Premier League | 0 | 0 | 0 | 0 | 0 | 0 | 0 | 0 | 0 | 0 |
| Everton | Total | | 0 | 0 | 0 | 0 | 0 | 0 | 0 | 0 | 0 | 0 |
| Tranmere Rovers (loan) | 2014–15 | League Two | 6 | 1 | — | | — | | — | | 6 | 1 |
| Oldham Athletic | 2015–16 | League One | 3 | 0 | 0 | 0 | 0 | 0 | 1 (Note: Appearance(s) in Football League Trophy) | 0 | 4 | 0 |
| Ossett Albion | 2015–16 | NPL Division One North | 4 | 0 | — | | — | | 3 (Note: Two appearances in Northern Premier League Challenge Cup; one appearance in West Riding County Cup) | 0 | 7 | 0 |
| Burnley | 2015–16 | Championship | 0 | 0 | 0 | 0 | — | | — | | 0 | 0 |
| Burnley | 2016–17 | Premier League | 0 | 0 | 0 | 0 | 0 | 0 | — | | 0 | 0 |
| Burnley | Total | | 0 | 0 | 0 | 0 | 0 | 0 | 0 | 0 | 0 | 0 |
| Kilmarnock (loan) | 2016–17 | Scottish Premiership | 4 | 0 | — | | 0 | 0 | — | | 4 | 0 |
| Salford City (loan) | 2016–17 | National League North | 8 | 0 | — | | — | | — | | 8 | 0 |
| Viking | 2017 | Eliteserien | 7 | 1 | 0 | 0 | — | | — | | 7 | 1 |
| Nuneaton Town | 2017–18 | National League North | 14 | 2 | 0 | 0 | — | | — | | 14 | 2 |
| Chester | 2018–19 | National League North | 12 | 0 | 0 | 0 | — | | 2 (Note: Appearance(s) in Cheshire Senior Cup) | 1 | 14 | 1 |
| Boston United | 2019–20 | National League North | 4 | 0 | 0 | 0 | — | | 4 (Note: One appearance in FA Trophy; three appearances one goal in Lincolnshire Senior Cup) | 1 | 8 | 1 |
| Career total | | | 62 | 4 | 0 | 0 | 0 | 0 | 10 | 2 | 72 | 6 |

== Personal life ==
Green is the father to two children, and lives in Cleckheaton. In September 2018, Green publicly spoke about his battles with drugs and alcohol and mental health.
