= Stian Michalsen =

Norwegian footballer (born 1997)

Personal information
- Full name: Stian Rokås Michalsen
- Date of birth: 28 March 1997 (age 29)
- Place of birth: Stavanger, Norway
- Height: 1.87 m (6 ft 2 in)
- Position: Winger

Team information
- Current team: Egersund
- Number: 10

Youth career
- Tasta
- 2012–2016: Viking

Senior career*
Years	Team	Apps	(Gls)
2016–2018	Viking	14	(0)
2016	→ Sola (loan)	12	(2)
2017	→ Ljungskile (loan)	10	(0)
2018–2020	Arendal	46	(8)
2021–	Egersund	100	(32)

International career
2012	Norway U15	5	(0)
2015	Norway U18	3	(0)
- * Club domestic league appearances and goals as of 14 November 2026

Stian Rokås Michalsen (born 28 March 1997) is a Norwegian footballer who plays as a winger for Egersund.

== Career ==
Michalsen made his league debut for Viking as a substitute against Start in October 2016.

In August 2018, he signed for 2. divisjon club Arendal. On 1 March 2021, he moved on to fellow 2. divisjon club Egersund.

== Career statistics ==
As of match played 22 October 2022

Club	Season	League			Cup		Total	
Club	Season	Division	Apps	Goals	Apps	Goals	Apps	Goals
Viking	2016	Eliteserien	1	0	0	0	1	0
Viking	2017	Eliteserien	6	0	1	1	7	1
Viking	2018	1. divisjon	7	0	1	0	8	0
Viking	Total		14	0	2	1	16	1
Sola (loan)	2016	2. divisjon	12	2	1	0	13	2
Ljungskile (loan)	2017	Division 1	10	0	0	0	10	0
Arendal	2018	2. divisjon	11	5	0	0	11	5
Arendal	2019	2. divisjon	17	3	1	0	18	3
Arendal	2020	2. divisjon	18	0	—		18	0
Arendal	Total		46	8	1	0	47	8
Egersund	2021	2. divisjon	26	13	1	0	27	13
Egersund	2022	2. divisjon	22	7	2	2	24	9
Egersund	Total		48	20	3	2	51	22
Career total			130	30	7	3	137	33
