= Herman Kleppa =

Norwegian footballer (born 1996)

Personal information
- Date of birth: 17 September 1996 (age 30)
- Place of birth: Stavanger, Norway
- Height: 1.80 m (5 ft 11 in)
- Position: Defender

Team information
- Current team: Egersund
- Number: 2

Youth career
- –2010: Stavanger
- 2011–2015: Viking

Senior career*
Years	Team	Apps	(Gls)
2015–2017	Viking	1	(0)
2017	→ Vidar (loan)	11	(1)
2018–2019	Sandnes Ulf	30	(0)
2019	→ Egersund (loan)	7	(1)
2020	Egersund	19	(3)
2021	Raufoss	16	(1)
2021–2022	Mjøndalen	17	(0)
2022–2024	Sandnes Ulf	54	(2)
2025–	Egersund	53	(3)
- * Club domestic league appearances and goals as of 14 November 2026

Herman Kleppa (born 17 September 1996) is a Norwegian footballer who plays as a defender for Egersund.

In January 2021, he signed a three-year contract with Raufoss. After only half a season with the club, he joined Mjøndalen on 31 August 2021. On 13 January 2025, he joined Egersund on a two-year contract.
