= Egersunds IK =

Norwegian sports club

Egersund
- Full name: Egersunds Idrettsklubb
- Nicknames: Tigrene (The Tigers), EIK
- Founded: 16 September 1919; 107 years ago
- Ground: Idrettsparken, Egersund
- Chairman: Bernt Blitzner
- Head coach: Endre Eide
- League: OBOS-ligaen
- 2026: 1. divisjon, 8th of 16
Home colours	Away colours

Egersunds Idrettsklubb, commonly known as Egersund or EIK, is a Norwegian sports club from Egersund in Rogaland. The club has sections for football, handball and athletics, and is most known for its football team, which plays in the 1. divisjon, the second tier of the Norwegian football league system.

== History ==
The inhabitants of Egersund first started playing football late in the 19th century, after influence from the English pottery-workers in the town. At first the football was not organized, but during the spring of 1909 Egersund Fodboldsklubb was founded. The club, who played in kits with yellow and black stripes, did not play any competitive matches, but is today considered the forerunner of Egersunds IK. After the First World War, the gymnastics club Egersunds TF created a football-team, and Egersunds IK was founded in September 1919 when the football section of Egersunds TF broke out to create its own club. The club soon joined the Football Association of Norway, and played its first match against Vidar.

Egersunds IK first match in the Norwegian Cup was a 0–3 loss against Viking in the first round of the 1925 Norwegian Cup. The club played in local leagues until 1939, when they qualified for the top-tier of the new national league, Norgesserien (League of Norway). The club's first season was interrupted by the Second World War, and when the league was reorganized after the war, Egersund ended up in the second tier. Further relegations followed, and the club has never been in the top tier of Norwegian football again. In 1957, Egersund were promoted to the second tier, and started one of the better periods of the club's history. A cup match away at Viking in Stavanger in 1960, drew a crowd of 4,269, the biggest attendance for any Egersund match, home or away. In the 1961 Norwegian Cup, Egersund eliminated Flekkefjord and Start to reach the third round of the Norwegian Cup, for the first time in history, where they lost 3–0 against Skeid at Bislett Stadion.

In the early 2000s, Egersund mostly played in the 3. divisjon, regularly fighting for promotion to the 2. divisjon. In 2006, the club employed former Northern Ireland international Jimmy Quinn as manager, but he left after a short time. In 2011, the club finished second in the 3. divisjon behind Start 2, As Start was relegated from Tippeligaen, their reserve could not play in the third tier and Egersund was promoted instead. The next season the team managed to survive a season in the 2. divisjon without being relegated, for the first time in nearly 30 years. The club also reached the third round of the Norwegian Cup in 2012, for the first time since 1961, after eliminating Vidar 11–10 in a penalty shoot-out.

After five successful years at the helm, Jone Mathiesen resigned as head coach in late 2012, being replaced by former Norway international Bengt Sæternes. After an inconsistent 2013-season, Sæternes guided EIK to second place behind promoted Åsane in 2014, before leaving for Sandnes Ulf in November that year. He was replaced by former Swedish International Magnus Powell, who also managed to steer his team to a runners up spot behind Ullensaker/Kisa in 2015. Powell resigned in November 2015 to take up the coaching post at Levanger FK. In December 2015 EIK appointed former Rangers player Maurice Ross as their new manager.

== Notable footballers ==
Kjell Iversen was the first former Egersunds-player to represent Norway, when he made his debut against Kuwait in 1982. Bengt Sæternes is another former Egersund player that has been capped for Norway. Jørgen Tengesdal, Kai Ove Stokkeland, Johan Lædre Bjørdal, Valon Berisha, Veton Berisha, Zlatko Tripić and Stian Koldal has played in Tippeligaen after starting their career in Egersund. Most of these players have moved to Viking, which helps Egersund with development of young players. Tripic' transfer to Molde in 2011, caused resentment in Viking, who considered discontinuing the cooperation with Egersund.

== Recent seasons ==
Season		Pos.	Pl.	W	D	L	GS	GA	P	Cup	Notes
2003	3. divisjon	3	22	12	6	4	53	31	42	First round	
2004	3. divisjon	↑ 1	22	17	4	1	57	17	55	First round	Promoted to 2. divisjon
2005	2. divisjon	↓ 12	26	5	8	13	34	51	23	First round	Relegated to 3. divisjon
2006	3. divisjon	3	22	13	3	6	53	30	42	First round	
2007	3. divisjon	9	26	9	6	11	42	44	33	First round	
2008	3. divisjon	6	26	13	4	9	58	39	43	First qualifying round	
2009	3. divisjon	3	26	17	4	5	75	35	55	First round	
2010	3. divisjon	2	26	19	1	6	76	28	58	Second qualifying round	
2011	3. divisjon	↑ 2	26	15	9	2	83	23	54	First round	Promoted to 2. divisjon
2012	2. divisjon	10	26	9	8	9	46	45	35	Third round	
2013	2. divisjon	7	26	10	5	11	41	45	35	Second round	
2014	2. divisjon	2	26	14	6	6	48	36	48	Third round	
2015	2. divisjon	2	26	16	7	3	55	22	55	First round	
2016	2. divisjon	3	26	13	4	9	48	28	43	Second round	
2017	2. divisjon	9	26	8	10	8	40	29	34	Third round	
2018	2. divisjon	4	26	12	8	6	47	28	44	Third round	
2019	2. divisjon	4	26	13	6	7	60	36	45	Second round	
2020	2. divisjon	3	19	10	4	5	48	22	34	Cancelled	
2021	2. divisjon	3	26	15	3	8	55	40	48	First round	
2022	2. divisjon	3	24	13	6	5	51	29	45	Second round	
2023	2. divisjon	↑ 1	26	19	5	2	73	21	62	First round	Promoted to 1. divisjon
2024	1. divisjon	4	30	14	5	11	57	56	47	Third round	
2025	1. divisjon	5	30	15	7	8	51	38	52	Fourth round	
2026	1. divisjon	8	30	11	8	11	50	57	41	Fourth round	

== Players ==
=== Current squad ===
As of 31 August, 2026

Note: Flags indicate national team as defined under FIFA eligibility rules; some limited exceptions apply. Players may hold more than one non-FIFA nationality.

No.	Pos.	Nation	Player
1	GK	POL	Marcel Zapytowski
2	DF	NOR	Herman Kleppa
3	DF	NOR	Bjørn Mæland
4	DF	SWE	Ali Suljić
5	DF	NOR	Nicolas Pignatel Jenssen
6	MF	NOR	Kasper Sætherbø
7	FW	DEN	Nicolaj Tornvig Hansen (on loan from Midtjylland)
8	MF	NOR	Chris Sleveland (captain)
10	MF	NOR	Stian Michalsen
12	GK	DEN	Mads Eriksen
14	MF	NOR	Jan Inge Lynum
15	DF	SEN	Ibrahima Diallo

No.	Pos.	Nation	Player
16	MF	NOR	Jostein Ekeland
17	DF	NOR	Sivert Westerlund
18	DF	NOR	Phillip Hovland
20	DF	NOR	Jonas Jørgensen
21	MF	NOR	Kristian Eggen
22	MF	NOR	Horenus Tadesse
25	MF	NOR	Jesper Gregersen (on loan from Sarpsborg)
26	MF	ISL	Breki Baxter
27	MF	NOR	Scott Vatne
28	FW	ISL	Hinrik Hardarson
29	MF	NOR	Arne Hetland
31	DF	SWE	Isak Jönsson

=== Out on loan ===
Note: Flags indicate national team as defined under FIFA eligibility rules; some limited exceptions apply. Players may hold more than one non-FIFA nationality.

No.	Pos.	Nation	Player
9	FW	NOR	Oscar Kapskarmo (at Sandefjord until 31 December 2026)

For season transfers, see List of Norwegian football transfers winter 2024–25, and List of Norwegian football transfers summer 2025.

== Athletics ==
The club hosted the Norwegian half-marathon championships in 1990, the relays championship in 1996, and the short course cross-country running championships in 2009.
