= 2013 Sogndal Fotball season =

Sogndal
2013 season
- Chairman: Tor Arne Ness
- Manager: Jonas Olsson
- Stadium: Fosshaugane Campus
- Tippeligaen: 12th
- Norwegian Cup: Fourth Round vs Vålerenga
- Top goalscorer: League: Malick Mané (10); All: Malick Mané (14)
Home colours	Away colours

The 2013 season was Sogndal's third season back in the Tippeligaen. They finished the season in 12th place and were knocked out of the cup by Vålerenga in the Fourth Round.

== Squad ==
Note: Flags indicate national team as defined under FIFA eligibility rules; some limited exceptions apply. Players may hold more than one non-FIFA nationality.

No.	Pos.	Nation	Player
2	DF	EST	Taijo Teniste
3	DF	NOR	Bjørn Inge Utvik
4	DF	FIN	Hannu Patronen
6	MF	SEN	Sidy Sagna
7	MF	NOR	Rune Bolseth
8	FW	NOR	Ulrik Flo
9	FW	NOR	Azar Karadas
11	FW	NOR	Martin Trøen
14	DF	NOR	Espen Næss Lund
15	DF	NOR	Anders Hella
16	DF	NOR	Eivind Daniel Røed
17	DF	NOR	Gustav Valsvik
18	FW	GHA	Mahatma Otoo

No.	Pos.	Nation	Player
19	MF	NOR	Magnus Stamnestrø (on loan from Molde)
20	DF	NOR	Thomas Eriksen Ness
21	GK	NOR	Leif Kvamme Lysne
22	FW	SEN	Malick Mané
23	FW	DEN	Tonny Brochmann
24	MF	NOR	Erik Bergum Skaasheim
25	MF	NOR	Ruben Holsæter
26	GK	SWE	Erik Dahlin
27	FW	NOR	Kristoffer Stephensen
28	MF	NOR	Peter Aase
29	GK	NOR	Mathias Dyngeland
30	FW	GHA	Gilbert Koomson (on loan from BEC Tero Sasana)

=== On Loan ===
Note: Flags indicate national team as defined under FIFA eligibility rules; some limited exceptions apply. Players may hold more than one non-FIFA nationality.

No. / Pos. / Nation / Player	No. / Pos. / Nation / Player

== Transfers ==
=== Winter ===
In: Note: Flags indicate national team as defined under FIFA eligibility rules; some limited exceptions apply. Players may hold more than one non-FIFA nationality.

No.	Pos.	Nation	Player
6	MF	SEN	Sidy Sagna (from (France) Saint-Étienne)
7	MF	NOR	Rune Bolseth (from (Norway) Hønefoss)
19	MF	NOR	Magnus Stamnestrø (loan from (Norway) Molde)
26	GK	SWE	Erik Dahlin (from (Sweden) IFK Göteborg)

Out: Note: Flags indicate national team as defined under FIFA eligibility rules; some limited exceptions apply. Players may hold more than one non-FIFA nationality.

No.	Pos.	Nation	Player
1	GK	NOR	Kenneth Udjus (to (Norway) Lillestrøm)
6	MF	CIV	Ahyee Aye Elvis (to (Norway) Vard Haugesund)
7	FW	NOR	Henrik Furebotn (to (Norway) Sandnes Ulf)
9	MF	NOR	Eirik Bakke (Retired)
12	MF	SEN	Stéphane Badji (to (Norway) Brann)
15	FW	NOR	Joakim Rudolfsen
16	DF	NOR	Eivind Daniel Røed
20	DF	NOR	Thomas Eriksen Ness

=== Summer ===
In: Note: Flags indicate national team as defined under FIFA eligibility rules; some limited exceptions apply. Players may hold more than one non-FIFA nationality.

No.	Pos.	Nation	Player
18	FW	GHA	Mahatma Otoo (from (Ghana) Hearts of Oak)
30	FW	GHA	Gilbert Koomson (loan from (Thailand) BEC Tero Sasana)

Out: Note: Flags indicate national team as defined under FIFA eligibility rules; some limited exceptions apply. Players may hold more than one non-FIFA nationality.

No.	Pos.	Nation	Player
5	DF	NOR	Per-Egil Flo (to (Norway) Molde)
10	MF	NOR	Ørjan Hopen (loan to (Norway) Bryne)
11	FW	BRA	Ricardo Santos (to (Sweden) Åtvidaberg)
18	FW	NOR	Stian Dyngeland (loan to (Norway) Fana)
30	FW	NOR	Stefan Aase

== Competitions ==
=== Tippeligaen ===
==== Results summary ====
Overall								Home						Away					
Pld	W	D	L	GF	GA	GD	Pts	W	D	L	GF	GA	GD	W	D	L	GF	GA	GD
30	8	9	13	33	48	−15	33	4	5	6	17	24	−7	4	4	7	16	24	−8

==== Results by round ====
Round	1	2	3	4	5	6	7	8	9	10	11	12	13	14	15	16	17	18	19	20	21	22	23	24	25	26	27	28	29	30
Ground	H	A	H	A	H	A	H	A	H	A	A	H	A	H	A	A	H	A	H	A	H	A	H	A	H	A	H	H	A	H
Result	D	L	L	W	D	L	W	D	W	L	W	D	W	D	D	D	D	L	L	W	W	L	L	L	L	D	L	W	L	L
Position	7	13	15	12	12	14	13	12	9	11	8	8	8	7	7	7	8	9	11	9	7	7	10	11	12	12	12	11	12	12

Updated to match(es) played on 10 November 2013. Source: see below
A = Away; H = Home; W = Win; D = Draw; L = Loss

==== Matches ====
17 March 2013 1	Sogndal	2–2	Tromsø	Sogndalsfjøra
18:00 CET (UTC+1)	Santos 26'; Flo 50'	Summary	Johansen 44'; Bendiksen 60' (yellow card) 65'; Prijović (yellow card) 90+3'	Stadium: Fosshaugane Campus; Attendance: 2,718; Referee: Kjetil Sælen

1 April 2013 2	Vålerenga	1–0	Sogndal	Oslo
19:00 CEST (UTC+2)	Børven 2'	Summary	Karadas (yellow card) 83'	Stadium: Ullevaal Stadion; Attendance: 10,442; Referee: Kristoffer Helgerud

5 April 2013 3	Sogndal	0–4	Rosenborg	Sogndalsfjøra
19:00 CEST (UTC+2)		Summary	Svensson (yellow card) 11' (goal) 45+2'; Mikkelsen 31'; Nielsen 45'; Elyounoussi 76'	Stadium: Fosshaugane Campus; Attendance: 3,154; Referee: Anders Johansen

13 April 2013 4	Molde	1–2	Sogndal	Molde
15:30 CEST (UTC+2)	Valle (yellow card) 22'; Gatt (yellow card) 79'; Hussain 90+5'	Summary	Santos 17'; Holsæter (yellow card) 40'; Flo (yellow card) 69'; Stamnestrø 86'; Mané (yellow card) 90+3'	Stadium: Aker Stadion; Attendance: 9,419; Referee: Trond Ivar Døvle

21 April 2013 5	Sogndal	0–0	Sarpsborg 08	Sogndalsfjøra
18:00 CET (UTC+1)		Summary	Berthod (yellow card) 23'; Breive (red card) 40'; Ásgeirsson (yellow card) 71'	Stadium: Fosshaugane Campus; Attendance: 2,418; Referee: Ola Hobber Nilsen

28 April 2013 6	Viking	4–1	Sogndal	Stavanger
15:30 CEST (UTC+2)	de Lanlay 5'; Ingelsten 10'; Olsen 90', 90'	Summary	Karadas 56'	Stadium: Viking Stadion; Attendance: 8,823; Referee: Per Ivar Staberg

5 May 2013 7	Sogndal	3–1	Brann	Sogndalsfjøra
19:00 CEST (UTC+2)	Valsvik (yellow card) 11'; Karadas 25'; Mané 49', 85'	Summary	El Fakiri (yellow card) 29'; Grønner (yellow card) 40' (yellow-red card) 54'; Haugen (yellow card) 65'; Askar 90'	Stadium: Fosshaugane Campus; Attendance: 4,063; Referee: Ken Henry Johnsen

9 May 2013 8	Lillestrøm	2–2	Sogndal	Lillestrøm
18:00 CEST (UTC+2)	Moen (yellow card) 54' (goal) 74' (pen.); Omoijuanfo 65'; Pálmason (yellow card) 73'	Summary	Patronen 22' (yellow card) 73' (yellow-red card) 84'; Valsvik 37'; Flo (yellow card) 71'; Dahlin (yellow card) 82'	Stadium: Åråsen Stadion; Attendance: 4,150; Referee: Trygve Kjensli

12 May 2013 9	Sogndal	2–0	Odd	Sogndalsfjøra
18:00 CEST (UTC+2)	Lund (yellow card) 29'; Mané 43'; Bolseth (yellow card) 48'; Karadas (yellow card) 66'; Skaasheim 80'	Summary	White (yellow card) 14'; Berge (yellow card) 80'	Stadium: Fosshaugane Campus; Attendance: 2,806; Referee: Svein-Erik Edvartsen

16 May 2013 10	Strømsgodset	3–1	Sogndal	Drammen
18:00 CEST (UTC+2)	Adjei-Boateng 3', 72'; Johansen 55'	Summary	Patronen (yellow card) 8'; Sagna (yellow card) 40'; Mané 71'	Stadium: Marienlyst Stadion; Attendance: 6,786; Referee: Trond Ivar Døvle

20 May 2013 11	Haugesund	0–1	Sogndal	Haugesund
18:00 CEST (UTC+2)	Bangura (yellow card) 68'	Summary	Utvik (yellow card) 17'; Mane 69' (pen.)	Stadium: Haugesund Stadion; Attendance: 4,661; Referee: Omar Rafiq

26 May 2013 12	Sogndal	1–1	Start	Sogndalsfjøra
18:00 CEST (UTC+2)	Karadas 33' (yellow card) 80'	Summary	Acosta (yellow card) 13'; Vilhjálmsson 69'; Kristjánsson (yellow card) 80'	Stadium: Fosshaugane Campus; Attendance: 4,011; Referee: Kjetil Sælen

23 June 2013 13	Sandnes Ulf	1–3	Sogndal	Sandnes
18:00 CEST (UTC+2)	Sola 84'	Summary	Holmvik 3' (o.g.); Sagna 51'; Valsvik 56'	Stadium: Sandnes Idrettspark; Attendance: 2,510; Referee: Svein-Erik Edvartsen

29 June 2013 14	Sogndal	1–1	Hønefoss	Sogndalsfjøra
20:05 CEST (UTC+2)	Bolseth 26'	Summary	Aðalsteinsson (yellow card) 17'; Groven (yellow card) 36'; Riski 43'	Stadium: Fosshaugane Campus; Attendance: 4,581; Referee: Per Ivar Staberg

6 July 2013 15	Aalesund	2–2	Sogndal	Ålesund
15:30 CEST (UTC+2)	James 29'; Matland (yellow card) 40'; Hamdallah 49'	Summary	Mané (yellow card) 37' (goal) 40'; Sagna (yellow card) 42' (yellow-red card) 73'; Karadas (yellow card) 78'; Stamnestrø 81'	Stadium: Color Line Stadion; Attendance: 7,601; Referee: Ola Hobber Nilsen

14 July 2013 16	Tromsø	2–2	Sogndal	Tromsø
18:00 CEST (UTC+2)	Ondrášek 38'; Koppinen (yellow card) 52'; Pritchard (yellow card) 59' (yellow-red card) 63'; Fojut 69'	Summary	Karadas 22'; Stamnestrø 26'; Holsæter (yellow card) 60'	Stadium: Alfheim Stadion; Attendance: 3,769; Referee: Brage Sandmoen

28 July 2013 17	Sogndal	1–1	Haugesund	Sogndalsfjøra
18:00 CEST (UTC+2)	Mané (yellow card) 23' (goal) 90+1' (pen.); Karadas (yellow card) 49'	Summary	Gytkjær (yellow card) 20'; Haraldseid 74'; Cvetinović (yellow card) 90'	Stadium: Fosshaugane Campus; Attendance: 3,348; Referee: Ola Hobber Nilsen

4 August 2013 18	Rosenborg	2–0	Sogndal	Trondheim
18:00 CET (UTC+2)	Reginiussen 9'; Nielsen 87'	Summary		Stadium: Lerkendal Stadion; Attendance: 14,211; Referee: Tom Harald Hagen

10 August 2013 19	Sogndal	1–2	Molde	Sogndalsfjøra
15:30 CEST (UTC+2)	Mané 24'; Bolseth (yellow card) 62'	Summary	Toivio (yellow card) 45+1' (goal) 73'; Høiland 75'	Stadium: Fosshaugane Campus; Attendance: 3,507; Referee: Espen Berntsen

18 August 2013 20	Sarpsborg 08	0–1	Sogndal	Sarpsborg
18:00 CEST (UTC+2)	Elyounoussi (yellow card) 63'	Summary	Sagna 33'; Koomson (yellow card) 45+3'; Patronen (yellow card) 73'; Otoo (yellow card) 77'	Stadium: Sarpsborg Stadion; Attendance: 3,647; Referee: Brage Sandmoen

24 August 2013 21	Sogndal	1–0	Viking	Sogndalsfjøra
15:30 CEST (UTC+2)	Bolseth 81'	Summary	Berisha (yellow card) 79'	Stadium: Fosshaugane Campus; Attendance: 3,867; Referee: Ken Henry Johnsen

30 August 2013 22	Brann	1–0	Sogndal	Bergen
19:00 CEST (UTC+2)	Pusic 6'; Haugen (yellow card) 43' (yellow-red card); Askar (yellow card) 70'; Demir (yellow card) 78'	Summary	Holsæter (yellow card) 62'; Karadas (yellow card) 70'; Patronen (yellow card) 90'	Stadium: Brann Stadion; Attendance: 12,200; Referee: Kristoffer Helgerud

14 September 2013 23	Sogndal	1–2	Lillestrøm	Sogndalsfjøra
15:30 CEST (UTC+2)	Mané 22'; Sagna (yellow card) 80'	Summary	Moen 10'; Andersson 24'; Stoor (yellow card) 70'; Mjelde (yellow card) 88'	Stadium: Fosshaugane Campus; Attendance: 2,942; Referee: Dag Vidar Hafsås

22 September 2013 24	Start	2–0	Sogndal	Kristiansand
18:00 CEST (UTC+2)	Vilhjálmsson 28', 48'; Vikstøl (yellow card) 90+2'	Summary	Stamnestrø (yellow card) 41'	Stadium: Sør Arena; Attendance: 10,345; Referee: Trygve Kjensli

27 September 2013 25	Sogndal	0–5	Strømsgodset	Sogndalsfjøra
19:00 CEST (UTC+2)		Summary	Kamara 8', 19', 22'; Hamoud (yellow card) 15'; Diomande 26'; Kastrati 90+2'	Stadium: Fosshaugane Campus; Attendance: 3,324; Referee: Svein-Erik Edvartsen

6 October 2013 26	Odd	0–0	Sogndal	Skien
18:00 CEST (UTC+2)		Summary	Bolseth (yellow card) 26'; Patronen (yellow card) 81'	Stadium: Skagerak Arena; Attendance: 5,843; Referee: Omar Rafiq

20 October 2013 27	Sogndal	1–2	Vålerenga	Sogndalsfjøra
18:00 CEST (UTC+2)	Sagna 52'	Summary	Zajić 59'; González (yellow card) 79'; Hæstad (yellow card) 83'; Grindheim 89'	Stadium: Fosshaugane Campus; Attendance: 4,084; Referee: Tom Harald Hagen

27 October 2013 28	Sogndal	2–1	Sandnes Ulf	Sogndalsfjøra
18:00 CEST (UTC+2)	Otoo 2'; Mané 26'; Bolseth (yellow card) 44'; Skaasheim (yellow card) 66'	Summary	Þorsteinsson (yellow card) 22'; Mihajlov (yellow card) 25'; Aanestad 45'	Stadium: Fosshaugane Campus; Attendance: 2,618; Referee: Trygve Kjensli

3 November 2013 29	Hønefoss	3–1	Sogndal	Hønefoss
18:00 CET (UTC+1)	Haugen 55'; Mathisen 57'; Riski 68' (yellow card) 69'	Summary	Stamnestrø 61'	Stadium: Aka Arena; Attendance: 2,214; Referee: Espen Berntsen

10 November 2013 30	Sogndal	1–2	Aalesund	Sogndalsfjøra
18:00 CET (UTC+1)	Karadas (yellow card) 68'; Flo 88'	Summary	Matland 25'; Ulvestad (yellow card) 67'; James 71' (yellow card) 81'; Arnefjord (yellow card) 87'	Stadium: Fosshaugane Campus; Attendance: 3,263; Referee: Trond Ivar Døvle

==== Table ====
Pos	Team	Pld	W	D	L	GF	GA	GD	Pts	Qualification or relegation
10	Lillestrøm	30	9	9	12	37	44	−7	36	
11	Vålerenga	30	10	6	14	41	50	−9	36	
12	Sogndal	30	8	9	13	33	48	−15	33	
13	Sandnes Ulf	30	9	6	15	36	58	−22	33	
14	Sarpsborg 08 (O)	30	8	7	15	40	58	−18	31	Qualification for the relegation play-offs

Source: fotball.no
Rules for classification: 1) points; 2) goal difference; 3) number of goals scored.
(O) Play-off winners

=== Norwegian Cup ===
17 April 2013 First Round	Tornado Måløy	0–4	Sogndal	Måløy
18:00 CEST (UTC+2)	Holvik (yellow card) 20'	Report	Lund 4', 24'; Karadas 47', 59'; Utvik (yellow card) 86'	Stadium: Måløy Stadion; Attendance: 200; Referee: Jonny Skjerven

1 May 2013 Second Round	Træff	3–3 (a.e.t.) (4–5 p)	Sogndal	Molde
18:00 CEST (UTC+2)	Engh 34' (pen.); Oltedal 47', 90+2' (yellow card) 81'; Flemmen (yellow card) 102'	Report	Flo 25'; Mané 31' (pen.), 49'; Bolseth (yellow card) 112'	Stadium: Reknesbanen; Attendance: 360; Referee: Sigurd Smehus Kringstad
	Penalties
	Håkon Sandnes (penalty scored); Kosberg (penalty missed); Rønningen (penalty scored); Flemmen (penalty scored); Fredriksen (penalty scored); Amundsgård (penalty missed); Leirvik (penalty missed)		(penalty missed) Mané; (penalty scored) Karadas; (penalty scored) Sagna; (penalty scored) Flo; (penalty scored) Valsvik; (penalty missed) Lund; (penalty scored) Teniste

29 May 2013 Third Round	Sogndal	4–3	Ull/Kisa	Sogndalsfjøra
18:00 CEST (UTC+2)	Mané 25', 83'; Flo 46'; Stamnestrø 78'	Report	Giæver 11', 77'; Rosenkilde (yellow card) 35'; Dos Santos 89'	Stadium: Fosshaugane Campus; Attendance: 420; Referee: Kristoffer Helgerud

26 June 2013 Fourth Round	Vålerenga	3–1	Sogndal	Oslo
18:00 CEST (UTC+2)	Børven 17'; Holm 72'; Calvo (yellow card) 76'; Abdellaoue 90+4'	Report	Holsæter 78'; Santos (yellow card) 90+2'	Stadium: Ullevaal Stadion; Attendance: 2,040; Referee: Espen Berntsen

== Squad statistics ==
As of match played 10 November 2013

=== Appearances and goals ===
No.	Pos	Nat	Player	Total		Tippeligaen		Norwegian Cup	
No.	Pos	Nat	Player	Apps	Goals	Apps	Goals	Apps	Goals
2	DF	(Estonia) EST	Taijo Teniste	32	0	30	0	2	0
3	DF	(Norway) NOR	Bjørn Inge Utvik	11	0	6+4	0	0+1	0
4	DF	(Finland) FIN	Hannu Patronen	28	1	24	1	4	0
6	MF	(Senegal) SEN	Sidy Sagna	30	3	25+3	3	2	0
7	MF	(Norway) NOR	Rune Bolseth	29	2	26	2	3	0
8	FW	(Norway) NOR	Ulrik Flo	33	4	27+2	2	4	2
9	FW	(Norway) NOR	Azar Karadas	31	6	20+7	4	4	2
14	DF	(Norway) NOR	Espen Næss Lund	15	2	3+9	0	2+1	2
15	DF	(Norway) NOR	Anders Hella	1	0	0+1	0	0	0
17	DF	(Norway) NOR	Gustav Valsvik	33	2	30	2	3	0
18	FW	(Ghana) GHA	Mahatma Otoo	10	1	6+4	1	0	0
19	MF	(Norway) NOR	Magnus Stamnestrø	22	5	6+13	4	2+1	1
21	GK	(Norway) NOR	Leif Kvamme Lysne	2	0	0+1	0	1	0
22	FW	(Senegal) SEN	Malick Mané	33	14	28+1	10	4	4
23	MF	(Denmark) DEN	Tonny Brochmann	1	0	0+1	0	0	0
24	MF	(Norway) NOR	Erik Bergum Skaasheim	27	1	19+5	1	3	0
25	MF	(Norway) NOR	Ruben Holsæter	31	1	26+1	0	4	1
26	GK	(Sweden) SWE	Erik Dahlin	33	0	30	0	3	0
27	FW	(Norway) NOR	Kristoffer Stephensen	14	0	3+9	0	1+1	0
30	MF	(Ghana) GHA	Gilbert Koomson	7	0	3+4	0	0	0
Players away from Sogndal on loan:
18	FW	(Norway) NOR	Stian Dyngeland	3	0	0+3	0	0	0
Players who left Sogndal during the season:
5	DF	(Norway) NOR	Per-Egil Flo	14	0	11	0	2+1	0
10	MF	(Norway) NOR	Ørjan Hopen	3	0	0+2	0	0+1	0
11	FW	(Brazil) BRA	Ricardo Santos	13	2	7+5	2	0+1	0

=== Goal scorers ===
Place	Position	Nation	Number	Name	Tippeligaen	Norwegian Cup	Total
1	FW	(Senegal)	22	Malick Mané	10	4	14
2	FW	(Norway)	9	Azar Karadas	4	2	6
3	MF	(Norway)	19	Magnus Stamnestrø	4	1	5
4	FW	(Norway)	8	Ulrik Flo	2	2	4
5	MF	(Senegal)	6	Sidy Sagna	3	0	3
6	FW	(Brazil)	11	Ricardo Santos	2	0	2
6	DF	(Norway)	17	Gustav Valsvik	2	0	2
6	MF	(Norway)	7	Rune Bolseth	2	0	2
6	DF	(Norway)	14	Espen Næss Lund	0	2	2
10	DF	(Finland)	4	Hannu Patronen	1	0	1
10	DF	(Norway)	24	Erik Bergum Skaasheim	1	0	1
10	FW	(Ghana)	18	Mahatma Otoo	1	0	1
10				Own goal	1	0	1
10	MF	(Norway)	25	Ruben Holsæter	0	1	1
				TOTALS	33	12	45

=== Disciplinary record ===
Number	Nation	Position	Name	Tippeligaen		Norwegian Cup		Total	
Number	Nation	Position	Name	Yellow card	Red card	Yellow card	Red card	Yellow card	Red card
3	(Norway)	DF	Bjørn Inge Utvik	1	0	1	0	2	0
4	(Finland)	DF	Hannu Patronen	6	1	0	0	6	1
5	(Norway)	DF	Per-Egil Flo	1	0	1	0	2	0
6	(Senegal)	MF	Sidy Sagna	4	1	0	0	4	1
7	(Norway)	MF	Rune Bolseth	4	0	1	0	5	0
9	(Norway)	FW	Azar Karadas	7	0	0	0	7	0
11	(Brazil)	FW	Ricardo Santos	0	0	1	0	1	0
14	(Norway)	MF	Espen Næss Lund	1	0	0	0	1	0
17	(Norway)	DF	Gustav Valsvik	1	0	0	0	1	0
18	(Ghana)	FW	Mahatma Otoo	1	0	0	0	1	0
19	(Norway)	MF	Magnus Stamnestrø	1	0	0	0	1	0
22	(Senegal)	FW	Malick Mané	3	0	0	0	3	0
24	(Norway)	MF	Erik Bergum Skaasheim	1	0	0	0	1	0
25	(Norway)	MF	Ruben Holsæter	3	0	0	0	3	0
26	(Sweden)	GK	Erik Dahlin	1	0	0	0	1	0
30	(Ghana)	MF	Gilbert Koomson	1	0	0	0	1	0
			TOTALS	36	2	3	0	39	2
