= 2014 Sogndal Fotball season =

Sogndal
2014 season
- Chairman: Tor Arne Ness
- Manager: Jonas Olsson
- Stadium: Fosshaugane Campus
- Tippeligaen: 15th Relegated
- Norwegian Cup: Fourth Round vs Viking
- Top goalscorer: League: Mahatma Otoo (9); All: Mahatma Otoo (12)
Home colours	Away colours

The 2014 season was Sogndal's fourth consecutive season in the Tippeligaen. They finished the season in 15th place, being relegated to the OBOS-ligaen, whilst also reaching the Fourth Round of the Norwegian Cup where they were beaten by Viking.

== Squad ==
As of 30 July 2014

Note: Flags indicate national team as defined under FIFA eligibility rules; some limited exceptions apply. Players may hold more than one non-FIFA nationality.

No.	Pos.	Nation	Player
1	GK	NOR	Mathias Dyngeland
2	DF	EST	Taijo Teniste
3	DF	NOR	Bjørn Inge Utvik
4	DF	FIN	Hannu Patronen
5	DF	ISL	Hjörtur Logi Valgarðsson
6	MF	NOR	Helge Haugen
7	MF	NOR	Rune Bolseth
8	FW	NOR	Ulrik Flo
12	GK	NOR	Kenneth Udjus (on loan from Lillestrøm)
14	DF	SWE	Tom Söderberg
15	MF	NOR	Petter Strand
16	MF	SEN	Babacar Sarr
17	DF	FRA	Christophe Psyché

No.	Pos.	Nation	Player
18	FW	GHA	Mahatma Otoo
19	FW	NGR	Edward Ofere
20	FW	NOR	Kristian Fardal Opseth
21	GK	NOR	Leif Lysne
22	FW	NOR	Tim André Nilsen
23	MF	DEN	Tonny Brochmann
24	DF	NOR	Erik Skaasheim
25	MF	NOR	Ruben Holsæter
27	MF	NOR	Kristoffer Stephensen
28	DF	NOR	Joar Tryti
33	MF	NOR	Runar Flugheim Heggestad
35	MF	NOR	Truls Hovland

== Transfers ==
=== Winter ===
In: Note: Flags indicate national team as defined under FIFA eligibility rules; some limited exceptions apply. Players may hold more than one non-FIFA nationality.

No.	Pos.	Nation	Player
5	DF	ISL	Hjörtur Logi Valgarðsson (from (Sweden) IFK Göteborg)
6	MF	NOR	Helge Haugen (from (Norway) Hønefoss)
10	MF	NOR	Ørjan Hopen (loan return from (Norway) Bryne)
15	MF	NOR	Petter Strand (from (Norway) Tertnes)
20	FW	NOR	Kristian Fardal Opseth (from (Norway) Førde)
22	FW	NOR	Tim André Nilsen (from (Norway) Nest-Sotra)

Out: Note: Flags indicate national team as defined under FIFA eligibility rules; some limited exceptions apply. Players may hold more than one non-FIFA nationality.

No.	Pos.	Nation	Player
6	MF	SEN	Sidy Sagna
14	DF	NOR	Espen Næss Lund (to (Norway) Kristiansund)
15	DF	NOR	Anders Hella (to (Norway) Fyllingsdalen)
16	DF	NOR	Eivind Daniel Røed
19	MF	NOR	Magnus Stamnestrø (loan return to (Norway) Molde)
20	DF	NOR	Thomas Ness
22	FW	SEN	Malick Mané (to (Sweden) IFK Göteborg)
30	MF	GHA	Gilbert Koomson (loan return to (Thailand) BEC Tero Sasana)

=== Summer ===
In: Note: Flags indicate national team as defined under FIFA eligibility rules; some limited exceptions apply. Players may hold more than one non-FIFA nationality.

No.	Pos.	Nation	Player
12	GK	NOR	Kenneth Udjus (on loan from (Norway) Lillestrøm)
14	DF	SWE	Tom Söderberg (on loan from (Sweden) Elfsborg)
16	MF	SEN	Babacar Sarr (from (Norway) Start)
17	DF	FRA	Christophe Psyché (from (Norway) HamKam)
19	FW	NGR	Edward Ofere (from (Denmark) Vestsjælland)

Out: Note: Flags indicate national team as defined under FIFA eligibility rules; some limited exceptions apply. Players may hold more than one non-FIFA nationality.

No.	Pos.	Nation	Player
9	FW	NOR	Azar Karadas (to (Norway) Brann)
10	MF	NOR	Ørjan Hopen (on loan to (Norway) Nest-Sotra)
11	FW	NOR	Martin Trøen (to (Norway) HamKam)
17	DF	NOR	Gustav Valsvik (to (Norway) Strømsgodset)
26	GK	SWE	Erik Dahlin (to (Sweden) IFK Trollhättan)
27	MF	NOR	Kristoffer Nesse Stephensen (on loan to (Norway) Fyllingsdalen)

== Competitions ==
=== Tippeligaen ===
==== Results summary ====
Overall								Home						Away					
Pld	W	D	L	GF	GA	GD	Pts	W	D	L	GF	GA	GD	W	D	L	GF	GA	GD
30	6	6	18	31	49	−18	24	5	3	7	16	18	−2	1	3	11	15	31	−16

==== Results by round ====
Round	1	2	3	4	5	6	7	8	9	10	11	12	13	14	15	16	17	18	19	20	21	22	23	24	25	26	27	28	29	30
Ground	A	H	A	H	A	H	A	H	A	H	H	A	H	A	H	A	H	A	H	A	H	A	H	A	H	A	A	H	A	H
Result	L	D	L	L	W	L	L	W	D	W	W	D	W	L	D	L	L	L	L	L	L	L	D	L	W	L	L	L	L	L
Position	15	15	16	16	12	14	16	13	12	11	10	10	9	9	8	10	10	12	13	14	14	14	15	15	14	14	14	14	15	15

Updated to match(es) played on 9 November 2014. Source: see below
A = Away; H = Home; W = Win; D = Draw; L = Loss

==== Results ====
30 March 2014 1	Stabæk	3–0	Sogndal	Bærum
18:00 CEST (UTC+2)	Henderson 14'; Næss 79'; Brustad 85'	Summary		Stadium: Nadderud Stadion; Attendance: 4,017; Referee: Tore Hansen

6 April 2014 2	Sogndal	1–1	Sarpsborg 08	Sogndalsfjøra
18:00 CEST (UTC+2)	Flo 56'	Summary	Dja Djédjé 2' (yellow card) 47'; Olanare (yellow card) 33'	Stadium: Fosshaugane Campus; Attendance: 2,511; Referee: Omar Rafiq

13 April 2014 3	Bodø/Glimt	4–2	Sogndal	Bodø
18:00 CEST (UTC+2)	Sané 17'; Karlsen (yellow card) 38'; Richards 54'; Badou 72'; N'Diaye 87'	Summary	Flo 15', 36'; Opseth (yellow card) 44'; Strand (yellow card) 52'	Stadium: Aspmyra Stadion; Attendance: 3,122; Referee: Ola Nilsen

21 April 2014 4	Sogndal	1–3	Strømsgodset	Sogndalsfjøra
18:00 CEST (UTC+2)	Hopen 10'; Opseth (yellow card) 89'	Summary	Høibråten 6'; Wikheim 52'; Ovenstad (yellow card) 66'; Storbæk (yellow card) 71'; Kovács 79'	Stadium: Fosshaugane Campus; Attendance: 2,875; Referee: Trond Ivar Døvle

27 April 2014 5	Haugesund	0–3	Sogndal	Haugesund
18:00 CEST (UTC+2)		Summary	Otoo 16'; Valgarðsson 34'; Utvik 57' (yellow card) 64'	Stadium: Haugesund Stadion; Attendance: 5,419; Referee: Tore Hansen

1 May 2014 6	Sogndal	1–2	Rosenborg	Sogndalsfjøra
19:00 CEST (UTC+2)	Otoo 7'; Hopen (yellow card) 81'	Summary	Reginiussen 28'; Svensson (yellow card) 40'; Søderlund 53'	Stadium: Fosshaugane Campus; Attendance: 4 068; Referee: Espen Berntsen

4 May 2014 7	Lillestrøm	2–0	Sogndal	Lillestrøm
18:00 CEST (UTC+2)	Pálmason 27' (yellow card) 52'; Knudtzon 48'	Summary	Karadas (yellow card) 16'	Stadium: Åråsen Stadion; Attendance: 5,058; Referee: Trygve Kjensli

11 May 2014 8	Sogndal	2–1	Start	Sogndalsfjøra
18:00 CEST (UTC+2)	Otoo 67'; Patronen (yellow card) 85'; Valsvik 89'; Nilsen 90+1'	Summary	Andersen 65'	Stadium: Fosshaugane Campus; Attendance: 2,524; Referee: Martin Lundby

16 May 2014 9	Aalesund	2–2	Sogndal	Ålesund
18:00 CEST (UTC+2)	Arnefjord 84'; Barrantes 87'	Summary	Otoo 39'; Nilsen 75'	Stadium: Color Line Stadion; Attendance: 6,580; Referee: Dag Vidar Hafsås

20 May 2014 10	Sogndal	2–1	Brann	Sogndalsfjøra
19:00 CEST (UTC+2)	Otoo 6'; Strand 44'; Karadas (yellow card) 90'; Utvik (yellow card) 90+2'; Valgarðsson (yellow card) 90+4'	Summary	Mojsov (yellow card) 22' Orlov 49'	Stadium: Fosshaugane Campus; Attendance: 4,035; Referee: Trygve Kjensli

25 May 2014 11	Sogndal	1–0	Sandnes Ulf	Sogndalsfjøra
18:00 CEST (UTC+2)	Nilsen 90+3'	Summary	Rubio (yellow card) 79' (yellow-red card) 85'	Stadium: Fosshaugane Campus; Attendance: 2,827; Referee: Espen Berntsen

9 June 2014 12	Odd	0–0	Sogndal	Skien
CEST (UTC+2)		Summary	Strand (yellow card) 31'; Patronen (yellow card) 43'; Dyngeland (yellow card) 81'	Stadium: Skagerak Arena; Attendance: 6,398; Referee: Dag Vidar Hafsås

12 June 2014 13	Sogndal	2–0	Vålerenga	Sogndalsfjøra
18:00 CEST (UTC+2)	Karadas (yellow card) 38'; Flo 59'; Holsæter 79'	Summary	Holm (yellow card) 54'	Stadium: Fosshaugane Campus; Attendance: 3,013; Referee: Kristoffer Helgerud

5 July 2014 14	Molde	3–0	Sogndal	Molde
15:30 CEST (UTC+2)	Chukwu 11'; Valsvik 33' (o.g.); Linnes 79'	Summary		Stadium: Aker Stadion; Attendance: 8,786; Referee: Trond Ivar Døvle

12 July 2014 15	Sogndal	0–0	Viking	Sogndalsfjøra
15:30 CEST (UTC+2)		Summary		Stadium: Fosshaugane Campus; Attendance: 2,875; Referee: Omar Rafiq

20 July 2014 16	Rosenborg	1–0	Sogndal	Trondheim
18:00 CEST (UTC+2)	Søderlund 24' (pen.)	Summary		Stadium: Lerkendal Stadion; Attendance: 11 323; Referee: Svein-Erik Edvartsen

27 July 2014 17	Sogndal	1–3	Odd	Sogndalsfjøra
18:00 CEST (UTC+2)	Psyché 75'; Haugen (yellow card) 79'	Summary	Eriksen (yellow card) 40'; Samuelsen 43'; Nordkvelle 84'; Storbæk 88'	Stadium: Fosshaugane Campus; Attendance: 2,845; Referee: Ola Hobber Nilsen

2 August 2014 18	Strømsgodset	1–1	Sogndal	Sogndalsfjøra
15:30 CEST (UTC+2)	Ogunjimi 11'; Kastrati (yellow card) 61'	Summary	Sarr (yellow card) 61'; Söderberg (yellow card) 61' (goal) 87'; Patronen (yellow card) 82'	Stadium: Fosshaugane Campus; Attendance: 7,149; Referee: Anders Johansen

10 August 2014 19	Sogndal	0–1	Bodø/Glimt	Sogndalsfjøra
18:00 CEST (UTC+2)	Ofere (yellow card) 90+1'	Summary	Chatto (yellow card) 47' (goal) 87'	Stadium: Fosshaugane Campus; Attendance: 3,071; Referee: Ken Henry Johnsen

16 August 2014 20	Viking	4–2	Sogndal	Stavanger
15:30 CEST (UTC+2)	Sigurðsson (yellow card) 25' (goal) 27'; Haugen 69'; Nisja 80' de Lanlay 90+3'	Summary	Valgarðsson (yellow card) 16'; Flo 21'; Brochmann 37'; Strand (yellow card) 70'; Patronen (yellow card) 75'	Stadium: Viking Stadion; Attendance: 8,260; Referee: Trond Ivar Døvle

24 August 2014 21	Sogndal	0–1	Lillestrøm	Sogndalsfjøra
18:00 CEST (UTC+2)		Summary	Amundsen 89'	Stadium: Fosshaugane Campus; Attendance: 3,556; Referee: Martin Lundby

31 August 2014 22	Start	3–2	Sogndal	Kristiansand
18:00 CEST (UTC+2)	Tripić 4'; Vikstøl 38'; Asante 84' (pen.)	Summary	Bolseth (yellow card) 18'; Sarr (yellow card) 21'; Otoo 35', 49'; Söderberg (yellow card) 79'	Stadium: Sør Arena; Attendance: 4,899; Referee: Svein Edvartsen

14 September 2014 23	Sogndal	1–1	Aalesund	Sogndalsfjøra
18:00 CEST (UTC+2)	Patronen (yellow card) 25'; Ofere (yellow card) 26'; Arnefjord 54' (o.g.)	Summary	Ulvestad (yellow card) 18'; James 43'	Stadium: Fosshaugane Campus; Attendance: 4,517; Referee: Andres Johansen

21 September 2014 24	Sarpsborg 08	3–1	Sogndal	Sarpsborg
18:00 CEST (UTC+2)	Castro 43'; Feldballe 52'; Zajić 57'	Summary	Flo (yellow card) 75'; Otoo 83'	Stadium: Sarpsborg Stadion; Attendance: 3,509; Referee: Anders Johansen

27 September 2014 25	Sogndal	4–1	Haugesund	Sogndalsfjøra
15:30 CEST (UTC+2)	Flo 11'; Nilsen 57', 61'; Patronen (yellow card) 77'; Otoo 83'	Summary	Sema 45'	Stadium: Fosshaugane Campus; Attendance: 3,321; Referee: Tom Harald Hagen

5 October 2014 26	Vålerenga	2–1	Sogndal	Oslo
18:00 CEST (UTC+2)	Zahid 41'; Patronen 50' (o.g.)	Summary	Nilsen 8'; Bolseth (yellow card) 29'; Sarr (yellow card) 88'	Stadium: Ullevaal Stadion; Attendance: 7,211; Referee: Svein Erik Edvartsen

19 October 2014 27	Sandnes Ulf	1–0	Sogndal	Sandnes
18:00 CEST (UTC+2)	Utvik 31' (o.g.); Sigurdsson (yellow card) 75'; Frejd (yellow card) 90+1'	Summary	Sarr (yellow card) 35'; Holsæter (yellow card) 90+1'; Udjus (yellow card) 90+4'	Stadium: Sandnes Idrettspark; Attendance: 2,428; Referee: Trygve Kjensli

26 October 2014 28	Sogndal	0–1	Molde	Sogndalsfjøra
18:00 CEST (UTC+2)		Summary	Elyounoussi 35'; Gabrielsen (yellow card) 60'	Stadium: Fosshaugane Campus; Attendance: 3,763; Referee: Trond Ivar Døvle

2 November 2014 29	Brann	2–1	Sogndal	Bergen
18:00 CEST (UTC+2)	Grønner 45'; Karadas 46'; Pedersen (yellow card) 80'; Sævarsson (yellow card) 86'	Summary	Flo 55'; Patronen (yellow card) 81'; Nilsen (yellow card) 88'	Stadium: Brann Stadion; Attendance: 17,686; Referee: Ken Henry Johnsen

9 November 2014 30	Sogndal	0–2	Stabæk	Sogndalsfjøra
18:00 CET (UTC+1)		Summary	Kassi 87'; Boli 90+2'	Stadium: Fosshaugane Campus; Attendance: 4,439; Referee: Svein Erik Edvartsen

==== Table ====
Pos	Team	Pld	W	D	L	GF	GA	GD	Pts	Qualification or relegation
12	Start	30	10	5	15	47	60	−13	35	
13	Bodø/Glimt	30	10	5	15	45	60	−15	35	
14	Brann (R)	30	8	5	17	41	54	−13	29	Qualification for the relegation play-offs
15	Sogndal (R)	30	6	6	18	31	49	−18	24	Relegation to First Division
16	Sandnes Ulf (R)	30	4	10	16	27	53	−26	22	Relegation to First Division

Source: fotball.no
Rules for classification: 1) points; 2) goal difference; 3) number of goals scored.
(R) Relegated

=== Norwegian Cup ===
24 April 2014 First Round	Årdal	0–4	Sogndal	Øvre Årdal
18:00 CEST (UTC+2)	Lereng (yellow card) 86'	Summary	Otoo 2'; Utvik 52'; Hopen 75'; Stephensen 77'; Holsæter (yellow card) 90+1'	Stadium: Jotun stadion Attendance: 650; Referee: Steinar Hauge

7 May 2014 Second Round	Åsane	0–2	Sogndal	Åsane
18:00 CEST (UTC+2)		Summary	Nilsen 38'; Patronen (yellow card) 58'; Holsæter (yellow card) 70'; Brochmann 82'	Stadium: Åsane Idrettspark; Attendance: 100; Referee: Kjetil Thorsø Hansen

4 June 2014 Third Round	Sogndal	3–0	Strømmen	Sogndalsfjøra
18:00 CEST (UTC+2)	Otoo 47', 66'; Nilsen 52'	Summary		Stadium: Fosshaugane Campus; Attendance: 518; Referee: Kai Erik Steen

24 April 2014 Fourth Round	Viking	4–1	Sogndal	Stavanger
19:00 CEST (UTC+2)	de Lanlay 25'; Sverrisson 57'; Böðvarsson 77'; Dyngeland 90' (o.g.)	Summary	Karadas 72'	Stadium: Viking Stadion; Attendance: 2,300; Referee: Brage Sandmoen

== Squad statistics ==
As of match played 9 November 2014

=== Appearances and goals ===
No.	Pos	Nat	Player	Total		Tippeligaen		Norwegian Cup	
No.	Pos	Nat	Player	Apps	Goals	Apps	Goals	Apps	Goals
1	GK	(Norway) NOR	Mathias Dyngeland	22	0	19	0	3	0
2	DF	(Estonia) EST	Taijo Teniste	27	0	25	0	2	0
3	DF	(Norway) NOR	Bjørn Inge Utvik	28	2	22+2	1	4	1
4	DF	(Finland) FIN	Hannu Patronen	24	0	21+1	0	2	0
5	DF	(Iceland) ISL	Hjörtur Logi Valgarðsson	30	1	26	1	4	0
6	MF	(Norway) NOR	Helge Haugen	30	0	25+2	0	3	0
7	MF	(Norway) NOR	Rune Bolseth	29	0	25+2	0	2	0
8	FW	(Norway) NOR	Ulrik Flo	27	7	23+3	7	0+1	0
12	GK	(Norway) NOR	Kenneth Udjus	6	0	6	0	0	0
14	DF	(Sweden) SWE	Tom Söderberg	7	1	7	1	0	0
15	MF	(Norway) NOR	Petter Strand	31	1	27+2	1	2	0
16	MF	(Senegal) SEN	Babacar Sarr	11	0	10+1	0	0	0
17	DF	(France) FRA	Christophe Psyché	10	1	5+5	1	0	0
18	FW	(Ghana) GHA	Mahatma Otoo	30	12	26+1	9	3	3
19	FW	(Nigeria) NGR	Edward Ofere	8	0	3+5	0	0	0
20	FW	(Norway) NOR	Kristian Fardal Opseth	13	0	2+8	0	2+1	0
22	FW	(Norway) NOR	Tim André Nilsen	30	8	10+16	6	2+2	2
23	MF	(Denmark) DEN	Tonny Brochmann	19	2	5+12	1	0+2	1
24	DF	(Norway) NOR	Erik Skaasheim	11	0	7+2	0	1+1	0
25	MF	(Norway) NOR	Ruben Holsæter	20	1	6+11	1	3	0
28	DF	(Norway) NOR	Joar Tryti	1	0	0+1	0	0	0
33	MF	(Norway) NOR	Runar Flugheim Heggestad	1	0	0	0	0+1	0
35	MF	(Norway) NOR	Truls Hovland	2	0	0+1	0	0+1	0
Players away from Stabæk on loan:
10	MF	(Norway) NOR	Ørjan Hopen	8	2	2+4	1	2	1
27	MF	(Norway) NOR	Kristoffer Nesse Stephensen	7	1	3+1	0	2+1	1
Players who appeared for Stabæk no longer at the club:
9	FW	(Norway) NOR	Azar Karadas	13	1	10	0	3	1
17	DF	(Norway) NOR	Gustav Valsvik	13	0	10	0	3	0
26	GK	(Sweden) SWE	Erik Dahlin	6	0	5	0	1	0

=== Goal scorers ===
Place	Position	Nation	Number	Name	Tippeligaen	Norwegian Cup	Total
1	FW	(Ghana)	18	Mahatma Otoo	9	3	12
2	FW	(Norway)	22	Tim André Nilsen	6	2	8
3	FW	(Norway)	8	Ulrik Flo	7	0	7
4	DF	(Norway)	3	Bjørn Inge Utvik	1	1	2
4	MF	(Norway)	10	Ørjan Hopen	1	1	2
4	MF	(Denmark)	23	Tonny Brochmann	1	1	2
7	DF	(Iceland)	5	Hjörtur Logi Valgarðsson	1	0	1
7	MF	(Norway)	15	Petter Strand	1	0	1
7	MF	(Norway)	25	Ruben Holsæter	1	0	1
7	DF	(France)	17	Christophe Psyché	1	0	1
7	DF	(Sweden)	14	Tom Söderberg	1	0	1
7				Own goal	1	0	1
7	MF	(Norway)	27	Kristoffer Nesse Stephensen	0	1	1
7	FW	(Norway)	9	Azar Karadas	0	1	1
				TOTALS	31	10	41

=== Disciplinary record ===
Number	Nation	Position	Name	Tippeligaen		Norwegian Cup		Total	
Number	Nation	Position	Name	Yellow card	Red card	Yellow card	Red card	Yellow card	Red card
1	(Norway)	GK	Mathias Dyngeland	1	0	0	0	1	0
3	(Norway)	DF	Bjørn Inge Utvik	2	0	0	0	2	0
4	(Finland)	DF	Hannu Patronen	7	0	0	0	7	0
5	(Iceland)	DF	Hjörtur Logi Valgarðsson	2	0	0	0	2	0
6	(Norway)	MF	Helge Haugen	1	0	0	0	1	0
7	(Norway)	MF	Rune Bolseth	2	0	0	0	2	0
8	(Norway)	FW	Ulrik Flo	1	0	0	0	1	0
9	(Norway)	FW	Azar Karadas	3	0	0	0	3	0
10	(Norway)	MF	Ørjan Hopen	1	0	0	0	1	0
12	(Norway)	GK	Kenneth Udjus	1	0	0	0	1	0
14	(Sweden)	DF	Tom Söderberg	2	0	0	0	2	0
15	(Norway)	MF	Petter Strand	3	0	0	0	3	0
16	(Senegal)	MF	Babacar Sarr	4	0	0	0	4	0
19	(Nigeria)	FW	Edward Ofere	2	0	0	0	2	0
20	(Norway)	FW	Kristian Fardal Opseth	2	0	0	0	2	0
22	(Norway)	FW	Tim André Nilsen	1	0	0	0	1	0
25	(Norway)	MF	Ruben Holsæter	1	0	2	0	3	0
27	(Norway)	MF	Kristoffer Nesse Stephensen	0	0	1	0	1	0
			TOTALS	36	0	3	0	39	0
