= 2015 Sogndal Fotball season =

Sogndal
2015 season
- President: Tor Arne Ness
- Manager: Eirik Bakke
- Stadium: Fosshaugane Campus
- OBOS-ligaen: 1st
- Norwegian Cup: Third round vs Hønefoss
Home colours	Away colours

The 2015 season was Sogndal's first season back in the OBOS-ligaen following their relegation at the end of the 2014 season. They finished the season as Champions, whilst also reaching the Third Round of the Norwegian Cup where they were defeated by Hønefoss.

== Squad ==
Note: Flags indicate national team as defined under FIFA eligibility rules; some limited exceptions apply. Players may hold more than one non-FIFA nationality.

No.	Pos.	Nation	Player
1	GK	(Norway) NOR	Mathias Dyngeland
2	DF	(Estonia) EST	Taijo Teniste
3	DF	(Norway) NOR	Bjørn Inge Utvik
4	DF	(Finland) FIN	Hannu Patronen
5	DF	(Norway) NOR	Victor Grodås
6	MF	(Norway) NOR	Helge Haugen
7	MF	(Norway) NOR	Rune Bolseth
8	FW	(Norway) NOR	Ulrik Flo
10	MF	(Norway) NOR	Thomas Drage
11	FW	(Nigeria) NGA	Osita Henry Chikere
12	GK	(Norway) NOR	Christian Sukke
14	MF	(Norway) NOR	Kristoffer Ryland
15	MF	(Norway) NOR	Petter Strand

No.	Pos.	Nation	Player
16	MF	(Senegal) SEN	Babacar Sarr
17	DF	(France) FRA	Christophe Psyché
18	FW	(Ghana) GHA	Mahatma Otoo
20	FW	(Norway) NOR	Kristian Fardal Opseth
21	GK	(Norway) NOR	Kristian Rutlin
22	MF	(Norway) NOR	Lars Christian Kjemhus
23	MF	(Norway) NOR	Edin Øy
24	DF	(Norway) NOR	Erik Skaasheim
25	MF	(Norway) NOR	Ruben Holsæter
28	DF	(Norway) NOR	Joar Tryti
29	GK	(Norway) NOR	Stefan Hagerup
33	MF	(Norway) NOR	Runar Flugheim Heggestad
35	MF	(Norway) NOR	Kenneth Blomseth Skjerven

== Transfers ==
=== Winter ===
In: Note: Flags indicate national team as defined under FIFA eligibility rules; some limited exceptions apply. Players may hold more than one non-FIFA nationality.

No.	Pos.	Nation	Player
5	DF	(Norway) NOR	Victor Grodås (from (Norway) Hødd)
10	FW	(England) ENG	Robin Shroot (from (Norway) Hødd)
11	FW	(Norway) NOR	Jim Johansen (on loan from (Norway) Bodø/Glimt)
12	GK	(Norway) NOR	Christian Sukke (on loan from (Norway) Sarpsborg 08)
22	MF	(Norway) NOR	Lars Christian Kjemhus (from (Norway) Fana)
—	MF	(Norway) NOR	Ørjan Hopen (loan return from (Norway) Nest-Sotra)
—	MF	(Norway) NOR	Martin Trøen (loan return from (Norway) HamKam)

Out: Note: Flags indicate national team as defined under FIFA eligibility rules; some limited exceptions apply. Players may hold more than one non-FIFA nationality.

No.	Pos.	Nation	Player
5	DF	(Iceland) ISL	Hjörtur Logi Valgarðsson (to (Sweden) Örebro SK)
12	GK	(Norway) NOR	Kenneth Udjus (loan return to (Norway) Lillestrøm)
14	DF	(Sweden) SWE	Tom Söderberg (loan return to (Sweden) IF Elfsborg)
19	FW	(Nigeria) NGA	Edward Ofere (to (Scotland) Inverness Calesonian Thistle)
21	GK	(Norway) NOR	Leif Lysne (released)
22	FW	(Norway) NOR	Tim André Nilsen (to (Norway) Mjøndalen)
23	MF	(Denmark) DEN	Tonny Brochmann (to (Norway) Sandnes)
27	MF	(Norway) NOR	Kristoffer Nesse Stephensen (to (Norway) Åsane)
—	MF	(Norway) NOR	Ørjan Hopen (to (Norway) Levanger)
—	MF	(Norway) NOR	Martin Trøen (to (Norway) Eidsvold)

=== Summer ===
In: Note: Flags indicate national team as defined under FIFA eligibility rules; some limited exceptions apply. Players may hold more than one non-FIFA nationality.

No.	Pos.	Nation	Player
6	MF	(Norway) NOR	Peter Aase (from (Norway) Florø)
10	MF	(Norway) NOR	Thomas Drage (from (Norway) Tromsø)
11	FW	(Nigeria) NGA	Osita Henry Chikere (free agent)

Out: Note: Flags indicate national team as defined under FIFA eligibility rules; some limited exceptions apply. Players may hold more than one non-FIFA nationality.

No.	Pos.	Nation	Player
8	FW	(Norway) NOR	Ulrik Flo (to (Norway) Odd)
10	FW	(Northern Ireland) NIR	Robin Shroot (to (Norway) Hødd)
11	FW	(Norway) NOR	Jim Johansen (loan return to (Norway) Bodø/Glimt)
12	GK	(Norway) NOR	Christian Sukke (loan return to (Norway) Sarpsborg 08)

== Competitions ==
=== OBOS-ligaen ===
==== Results summary ====
Overall								Home						Away					
Pld	W	D	L	GF	GA	GD	Pts	W	D	L	GF	GA	GD	W	D	L	GF	GA	GD
30	18	8	4	59	31	+28	62	11	3	1	31	15	+16	7	5	3	28	16	+12

Last updated: 1 November 2015.
Source: see below

==== Results by round ====
Round	1	2	3	4	5	6	7	8	9	10	11	12	13	14	15	16	17	18	19	20	21	22	23	24	25	26	27	28	29	30
Ground	H	A	H	A	H	A	H	A	H	A	H	A	A	H	H	A	A	H	A	H	A	H	H	A	H	A	A	H	H	A
Result	W	D	W	W	D	L	W	W	W	W	W	W	W	D	D	D	L	W	D	D	W	W	W	L	W	D	W	W	W	L
Position	1	4	4	3	3	4	1	1	1	1	1	1	1	1	1	1	1	1	1	1	1	1	1	1	1	1	1	1	1	1

Updated to match(es) played on 1 November 2015. Source: see below
A = Away; H = Home; W = Win; D = Draw; L = Loss

==== Results ====
6 April 2015 1	Sogndal	3–1	Bærum	Sogndalsfjøra
18:00 CEST (UTC+2)	Shroot 34'; U. Flo 58'; Psyché 67'	Report	Pedersen 83'	Stadium: Fosshaugane Campus; Attendance: 2,417; Referee: Steinar Hauge

12 April 2015 2	Jerv	0–0	Sogndal	Grimstad
18:00 CEST (UTC+2)		Report		Stadium: Levermyr Stadion; Attendance: 1,407; Referee: Espen Eskås

19 April 2015 3	Sogndal	2–1	Hønefoss	Sogndalsfjøra
18:00 CEST (UTC+2)	Opseth 53', 72'	Report	Hamutenya 5'	Stadium: Fosshaugane Campus; Attendance: 2,387; Referee: Kim Rune Borgersen

26 April 2015 4	Nest-Sotra	1–2	Sogndal	Ågotnes
18:00 CEST (UTC+2)	Hammersland 28'	Report	Opseth 3'; Sarr 78'	Stadium: Ågotnes Stadion; Attendance: 920; Referee: Ole Gya

30 April 2015 5	Sogndal	1–3	Levanger	Sogndalsfjøra
18:00 CEST (UTC+2)	Strand 59'	Report	Bye 7', 58'; Flakk 27'	Stadium: Fosshaugane Campus; Attendance: 2,085; Referee: Anders Gjermshus

3 May 2015 6	Kristiansund	1–1	Sogndal	Kristiansund
18:00 CEST (UTC+2)	Lund 90+3'	Report	Kjemhus 66'	Stadium: Kristiansund Stadion; Attendance: 1,583; Referee: Ole Gya

10 May 2015 7	Sogndal	3–0	Åsane	Sogndalsfjøra
18:00 CEST (UTC+2)	Johansen 6', 28'; Shroot 26'	Report		Stadium: Fosshaugane Campus; Attendance: 2,263; Referee: Martin Lundby

13 May 2015 8	Bryne	0–2	Sogndal	Bryne
18:00 CEST (UTC+2)		Report	Otoo 18'; Kjemhus 44'	Stadium: Bryne Stadion; Attendance: 1,219; Referee: Bjørn Hansen

16 May 2015 9	Sogndal	1–0	Ranheim	Sogndalsfjøra
18:00 CEST (UTC+2)	Shroot 44'	Report		Stadium: Fosshaugane Campus; Attendance: 2,637; Referee: Anders Gjermshus

25 May 2015 10	Sandnes Ulf	1–2	Sogndal	Sandnes
15:00 CEST (UTC+2)	Skjølsvik 18'	Report	Otoo 3'; Patronen 26'	Stadium: Sandnes Idrettspark; Attendance: 2,150; Referee: Steinar Hauge

31 May 2015 11	Sogndal	2–0	Fredrikstad	Sogndalsfjøra
15:00 CEST (UTC+2)	Patronen 8', 32'	Report		Stadium: Fosshaugane Campus; Attendance: 2,722; Referee: Jan Morten Tennøy

7 June 2015 12	Follo	0–1	Sogndal	Ski
18:00 CEST (UTC+2)		Report	Utvik 90+5'	Stadium: Ski Stadion; Attendance: 1,065; Referee: Christian Moen

21 June 2015 13	Brann	0–4	Sogndal	Bergen
18:00 CEST (UTC+2)		Report	Opseth 5', 77', 80'; Otoo 23'	Stadium: Brann Stadion; Attendance: 14,147; Referee: Martin Lundby

24 June 2015 16	Sogndal	1–1	Jerv	Sogndalsfjøra
19:00 CEST (UTC+2)	Opseth 52'	Report	Andersen 90+1'	Stadium: Fosshaugane Campus; Attendance: 2,407; Referee: Kai Erik Steen

27 June 2015 14	Sogndal	1–1	Hødd	Sogndalsfjøra
20:00 CEST (UTC+2)	Shroot 13'	Report	Sveen 90+3'	Stadium: Fosshaugane Campus; Attendance: 4,768; Referee: Torkjell Trædal

5 July 2015 15	Strømmen	1–1	Sogndal	Strømmen
18:00 CEST (UTC+2)	Konate 44'	Report	Otoo 57' (pen.)	Stadium: Strømmen Stadion; Attendance: 426; Referee: Jan Morten Tennøy

3 August 2015 17	Ranheim	3–2	Sogndal	Trondheim
19:00 CEST (UTC+2)	Stene 51'; Tronseth 76'; Blakstad 90+1'	Report	Opseth 23', 32'	Stadium: DnB Arena; Attendance: 646; Referee: Sigurd Kringstad

10 August 2015 18	Sogndal	3–1	Bryne	Sogndalsfjøra
19:00 CEST (UTC+2)	Otoo 15'; Sarr 18'; Utvik 43'	Report	Utvik 65' (o.g.)	Stadium: Fosshaugane Campus; Attendance: 2,518; Referee: Omar Rafiq

13 August 2015 19	Fredrikstad	1–1	Sogndal	Fredrikstad
19:00 CEST (UTC+2)	Nilsen 84' (pen.)	Report	Sarr 78'	Stadium: Fredrikstad Stadion; Attendance: 3,850; Referee: Torkjell Trædal

17 August 2015 20	Sogndal	0–0	Brann	Sogndalsfjøra
19:00 CEST (UTC+2)		Report		Stadium: Fosshaugane Campus; Attendance: 5,287; Referee: Tom Harald Hagen

23 August 2015 21	Bærum	0–5	Sogndal	Bærum
18:00 CEST (UTC+2)		Report	Opseth 30', 62' (pen.); Utvik 36'; Otoo 75', 81'	Stadium: Sandvika Stadion; Attendance: 609; Referee: Steinar Hauge

30 August 2015 22	Sogndal	2–1	Follo	Sogndalsfjøra
18:00 CEST (UTC+2)	Otoo 62'; Mjønner 90' (o.g.)	Report	Karoliussen 54'	Stadium: Fosshaugane Campus; Attendance: 2,932; Referee: Petter Toppe

14 September 2015 23	Sogndal	3–0	Nest-Sotra	Sogndalsfjøra
19:00 CEST (UTC+2)	Opseth 35', 86'; Otoo 40'	Report		Stadium: Fosshaugane Campus; Attendance: 2,611; Referee: Kim Rune Borgersen

21 September 2015 24	Hødd	1–0	Sogndal	Ulsteinvik
19:00 CEST (UTC+2)	Moltu 79'	Report		Stadium: Høddvoll Stadion; Attendance: 2,505; Referee: Omar Rafiq

28 September 2015 25	Sogndal	3–2	Strømmen	Sogndalsfjøra
19:00 CEST (UTC+2)	Patronen 37'; Bolseth 52'; Holsæter 89'	Report	Ramsland 57'; Blårud 74'	Stadium: Fosshaugane Campus; Attendance: 2,289; Referee: Sigurd Kringstad

4 October 2015 26	Åsane	1–1	Sogndal	Åsane
15:00 CEST (UTC+2)	Leikvoll Moberg 14'	Report	Strand 62'	Stadium: Myrdal Gress; Attendance: 941; Referee: Bjørn Hansen

18 October 2015 28	Hønefoss	2–5	Sogndal	Hønefoss
15:30 CEST (UTC+2)	Kastrati 19'; Seck 87'	Report	Sarr 17'; Otoo 42', 82'; Svendsen 54' (o.g.); Opseth 80'	Stadium: AKA Arena; Attendance: 1,469; Referee: Per Erik Haugen

21 October 2015 27	Sogndal	4–3	Kristiansund	Sogndalsfjøra
19:00 CEST (UTC+2)	Otoo 7', 39'; Opseth 52'; Drage 60'	Report	Rønningen 36'; Torske 56'; D. Ulvestad 90+3'	Stadium: Fosshaugane Campus; Attendance: 2,339; Referee: Kai Erik Steen

25 October 2015 29	Sogndal	2–1	Sandnes Ulf	Sogndalsfjøra
13:00 CET (UTC+1)	Holsæter 44'; Opseth 48'	Report	Geertsen 57'	Stadium: Fosshaugane Campus; Attendance: 3,517; Referee: Petter Toppe

1 November 2015 30	Levanger	4–1	Sogndal	Levanger
13:00 CET (UTC+1)	Bye 7', 63'; Braaten 36'; Stokke 40'	Report	Strand 82'	Stadium: Moan Kunstgress; Attendance: 965; Referee: Steinar Hauge

==== Table ====
Pos	Team	Pld	W	D	L	GF	GA	GD	Pts	Promotion, qualification or relegation
1	Sogndal (C, P)	30	18	8	4	59	31	+28	62	Promotion to Tippeligaen
2	Brann (P)	30	14	11	5	46	35	+11	53	Promotion to Tippeligaen
3	Kristiansund	30	14	7	9	37	30	+7	49	Qualification for the promotion play-offs
4	Hødd	30	14	6	10	43	40	+3	48	Qualification for the promotion play-offs
5	Jerv	30	12	11	7	47	28	+19	47	Qualification for the promotion play-offs

Source: nifs.no
Rules for classification: 1) points; 2) goal difference; 3) number of goals scored.
(C) Champions; (P) Promoted

=== Norwegian Cup ===
22 April 2015 First Round	Lysekloster	1–5	Sogndal	Lyse Abbey
18:00 CEST (UTC+2)	K.Liseth 75'; T.Helland (yellow card) 77'	Report	Kjemhus 18', 67'; Otoo 23'; Opseth 27'; F.Flo 90+1'	Stadium: Kuventræ; Attendance: 700; Referee: Steinar Hauge

6 May 2015 Second Round	HamKam	0–2	Sogndal	Hamar
18:00 CEST (UTC+2)		Report	U.Flo 18'; Utvik (yellow card) 45'; Otoo 54'	Stadium: Briskeby Arena; Attendance: 475; Referee: Bjørn Hansen

3 June 2015 Third Round	Sogndal	1–2	Hønefoss	Sogndalsfjøra
18:00 CEST (UTC+2)	Psyché 81'	Report	Mané 59', 62'; O.Berget (yellow card) 83'	Stadium: Fosshaugane Campus; Attendance: 539; Referee: Petter Toppe

== Squad statistics ==
As of match played 5 November 2017

=== Appearances and goals ===
No.	Pos	Nat	Player	Total		OBOS-ligaen		Norwegian Cup	
No.	Pos	Nat	Player	Apps	Goals	Apps	Goals	Apps	Goals
1	GK	(Norway) NOR	Mathias Dyngeland	12	0	12	0	0	0
2	DF	(Estonia) EST	Taijo Teniste	27	0	25	0	2	0
3	DF	(Norway) NOR	Bjørn Inge Utvik	28	3	16+9	3	3	0
4	DF	(Finland) FIN	Hannu Patronen	25	4	23+2	4	0	0
5	DF	(Norway) NOR	Victor Grodås	26	0	23	0	2+1	0
6	MF	(Norway) NOR	Peter Aase	5	0	1+4	0	0	0
7	MF	(Norway) NOR	Rune Bolseth	28	1	22+4	1	1+1	0
10	MF	(Norway) NOR	Thomas Drage	13	1	13	1	0	0
11	FW	(Nigeria) NGA	Osita Henry Chikere	8	0	1+7	0	0	0
15	MF	(Norway) NOR	Petter Strand	28	3	26	3	2	0
16	MF	(Senegal) SEN	Babacar Sarr	32	4	29	4	3	0
17	DF	(France) FRA	Christophe Psyché	31	2	26+2	1	3	1
18	FW	(Ghana) GHA	Mahatma Otoo	29	15	21+5	13	3	2
20	FW	(Norway) NOR	Kristian Fardal Opseth	28	17	21+5	16	1+1	1
21	GK	(Norway) NOR	Kristian Rutlin	1	0	0	0	0+1	0
22	MF	(Norway) NOR	Lars Christian Kjemhus	23	4	15+5	2	3	2
23	MF	(Norway) NOR	Edin Øy	4	0	0+4	0	0	0
24	DF	(Norway) NOR	Erik Skaasheim	17	0	9+6	0	2	0
25	MF	(Norway) NOR	Ruben Holsæter	9	2	2+7	2	0	0
29	GK	(Norway) NOR	Stefan Hagerup	13	0	12	0	1	0
30	GK	(Norway) NOR	Håvard Follevåg Mjelleli	1	0	0	0	1	0
31	FW	(Norway) NOR	Fredrik Flo	3	1	0+2	0	0+1	1
34	MF	(Norway) NOR	Simen Brekkhus	2	0	0	0	1+1	0
36	FW	(Norway) NOR	Asgrim Farnes	10	0	3+6	0	0+1	0
	DF	(Norway) NOR	Sindre Austevoll	1	0	0	0	0+1	0
Players away from Sogndal on loan:
Players who left Sogndal during the season:
8	FW	(Norway) NOR	Ulrik Flo	17	2	13+2	1	2	1
10	FW	(Northern Ireland) NIR	Robin Shroot	12	4	6+5	4	1	0
11	FW	(Norway) NOR	Jim Johansen	13	2	5+6	2	1+1	0
12	GK	(Norway) NOR	Christian Sukke	7	0	6	0	1	0

=== Goal scorers ===
Place	Position	Nation	Number	Name	OBOS-ligaen	Norwegian Cup	Total
1	FW	(Norway)	20	Kristian Fardal Opseth	16	1	17
2	FW	(Ghana)	18	Mahatma Otoo	13	2	15
3	DF	(Finland)	4	Hannu Patronen	4	0	4
3	FW	(Northern Ireland)	10	Robin Shroot	4	0	4
3	MF	(Senegal)	16	Babacar Sarr	4	0	4
3	MF	(Norway)	22	Lars Christian Kjemhus	2	2	4
7	DF	(Norway)	3	Bjørn Inge Utvik	3	0	3
7	MF	(Norway)	15	Petter Strand	3	0	3
9	FW	(Norway)	11	Jim Johansen	2	0	2
9	MF	(Norway)	25	Ruben Holsæter	2	0	2
9	FW	(Norway)	8	Ulrik Flo	1	1	2
9	DF	(France)	17	Christophe Psyché	1	1	2
9				Own goal	2	0	2
14	MF	(Norway)	10	Thomas Drage	1	0	1
14	MF	(Norway)	7	Rune Bolseth	1	0	1
14	FW	(Norway)	31	Fredrik Flo	0	1	1
				TOTALS	59	8	67

=== Disciplinary record ===
Number	Nation	Position	Name	OBOS-ligaen		Norwegian Cup		Total	
Number	Nation	Position	Name	Booked	Sent off (straight red)	Booked	Sent off (straight red)	Booked	Sent off (straight red)
2	(Estonia)	DF	Taijo Teniste	2	0	0	0	2	0
3	(Norway)	DF	Bjørn Inge Utvik	3	0	1	0	4	0
4	(Finland)	DF	Hannu Patronen	4	0	0	0	4	0
5	(Norway)	DF	Victor Grodås	3	0	0	0	3	0
6	(Norway)	MF	Peter Aase	1	0	0	0	1	0
7	(Norway)	MF	Rune Bolseth	1	0	0	0	1	0
8	(Norway)	FW	Ulrik Flo	2	0	0	0	2	0
10	(Norway)	MF	Thomas Drage	1	0	0	0	1	0
11	(Norway)	FW	Jim Johansen	1	0	0	0	1	0
15	(Norway)	MF	Petter Strand	2	0	0	0	2	0
16	(Senegal)	MF	Babacar Sarr	4	0	0	0	4	0
17	(France)	DF	Christophe Psyché	3	1	0	0	3	1
18	(Ghana)	FW	Mahatma Otoo	2	0	0	0	2	0
20	(Norway)	FW	Kristian Fardal Opseth	1	0	0	0	1	0
22	(Norway)	MF	Lars Christian Kjemhus	2	0	0	0	2	0
25	(Norway)	MF	Ruben Holsæter	1	0	0	0	1	0
34	(Norway)	MF	Simen Brekkhus	1	0	0	0	1	0
			TOTALS	34	1	1	0	35	1
