= Stian Dyngeland =

Norwegian footballer (born 1991)

Personal information
- Full name: Stian Lønne Dyngeland
- Date of birth: 13 February 1991 (age 35)
- Place of birth: Totland, Norway
- Height: 1.81 m (5 ft 11 in)
- Position: Forward

Senior career*
Years	Team	Apps	(Gls)
2007–2011	Fana		
2012–2014	Sogndal	16	(1)
2013	→ Fana (loan)	11	(3)
2014–2016	Fana	57	(7)
2017	Fram	13	(1)
2017–2018	Lysekloster	19	(6)
2018–2019	Fram	20	(2)
2019	Os	6	(1)
Total		142	(21)
- * Club domestic league appearances and goals

Stian Lønne Dyngeland (born 13 February 1991) is a Norwegian former professional footballer who played as a forward for Fana, Sogndal and Lysekloster, among other clubs. He is the older brother of goalkeeper Mathias Dyngeland.

== Career ==
Dyngeland was born in Totland in Bergen Municipality and he started his career with the local team Fana IL where he was the team's top goalscorer in the 2011 3. Divisjon with 17 goals.

Dyngeland joined Sogndal IL in 2012 after he moved to Sogndal to study, and was originally meant to play for the reserve team in the 4. divisjon. After impressing in the pre-season for Sogndal's first team, head coach Jonas Olsson decided to promote Dyngeland to the first-team squad. He made his debut for Sogndal in the opening match of the 2012 Tippeligaen season against Odd Grenland on 25 March 2012, when he replaced Malick Mane as a substitute in the 90th minute. He made his first start in Tippeligaen when Stabæk was beaten 3–1 on 15 July 2012. Dyngeland scored his first goal for Sogndal against Aalesund on 28 October 2012, when he secured a vital point in a battle against relegation after equalizing to 1–1 three minutes after he came on as a substitute. Dyngeland played a total of 13 matches in his first season with Sogndal when the team avoided relegation.

In August 2013, Dyngeland returned to his old club Fana, on loan till the end of the season.

Dyngeland retired after the 2019 season, where he played for Os, to focus on his civil career as a police officer.

== Personal life ==
Dyngeland's younger brother Mathias is a goalkeeper currently playing for Brann. They have played together at Fana and Sogndal. While both were at Fana together, Mathias received a lot of attention at the age of 15 after his performance in a 2011 Norwegian Football Cup tie against Brann. The two have two younger brothers, Sander and Noah, both currently playing at Norwegian Third Division side IL Gneist. All four brothers started out at Fana, with Sander also spending time at Stian's former club Os.

Dyngeland enjoys singing, and in 2013 he joined the competition Idol after being persuaded by Sogndal supporter and Idol judge Tone Damli Aaberge. Despite receiving praise from judge Kurt Nilsen, Dyngeland did not progress from the audition, but he stated that it might have been the best for his footballing career, given that he had to skip a training session to attend the audition.

== Career statistics ==
As of 8 October 2013

Season	Club	Division	League		Cup		Total	
Season	Club	Division	Apps	Goals	Apps	Goals	Apps	Goals
2012	Sogndal	Tippeligaen	13	1	1	0	14	1
2013	Sogndal	Tippeligaen	3	0	0	0	3	0
Career Total			16	1	1	0	17	1
