= Kristian Opseth =

Norwegian footballer (born 1990)

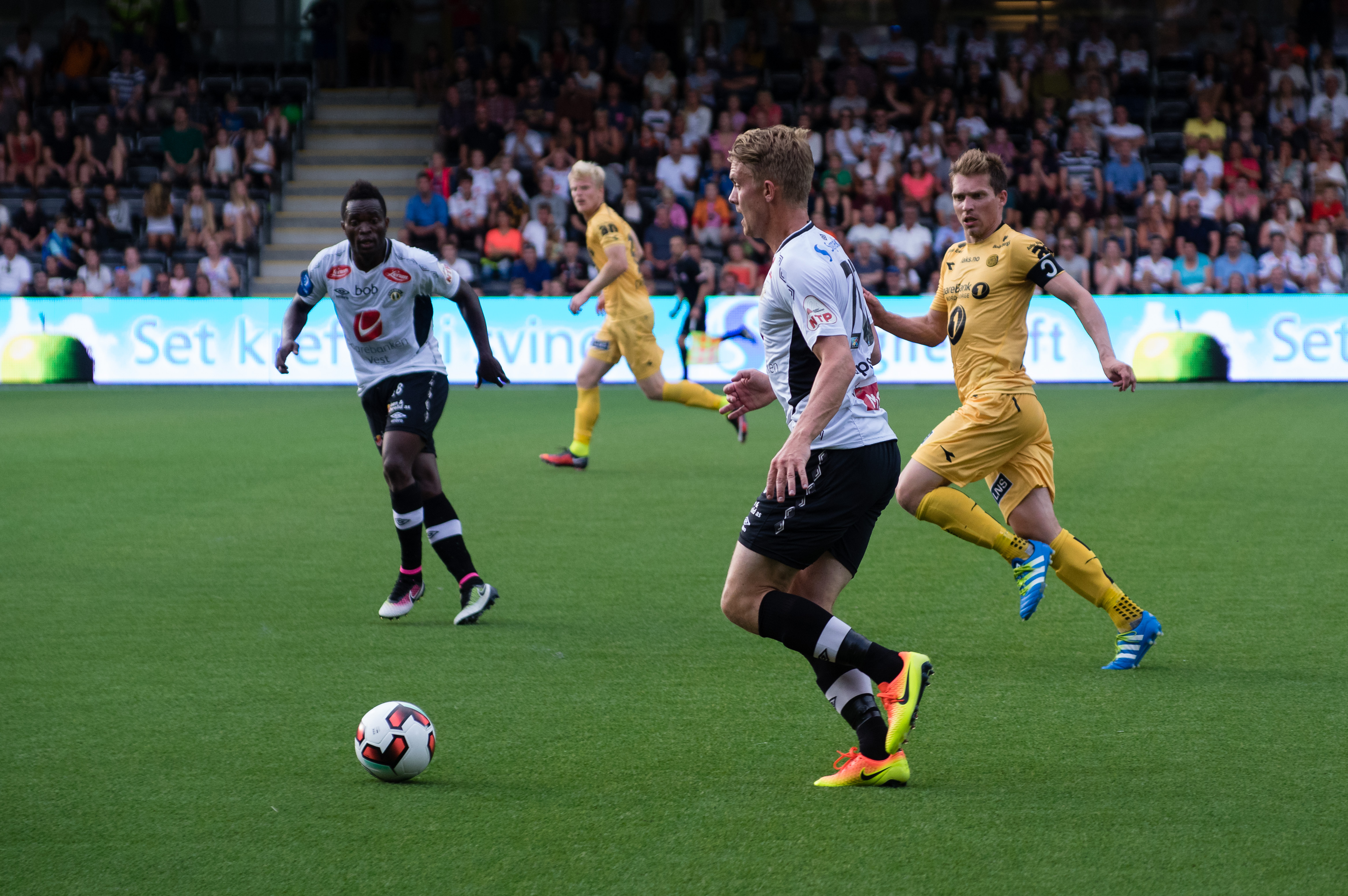
- Opseth with Sogndal in 2016

Personal information
- Full name: Kristian Fardal Opseth
- Date of birth: 6 January 1990 (age 36)
- Place of birth: Kaupanger, Norway
- Height: 1.88 m (6 ft 2 in)
- Position: Striker

Team information
- Current team: Stabæk
- Number: 22

Youth career
- Kaupanger

Senior career*
Years	Team	Apps	(Gls)
2012–2013	Førde	42	(36)
2014–2017	Sogndal	54	(18)
2017	→ Bodø/Glimt (loan)	13	(10)
2017–2019	Bodø/Glimt	47	(28)
2019	Erzurumspor	12	(1)
2019–2020	Adelaide United	21	(6)
2020–2021	Bengaluru	15	(1)
2021–2023	Sarpsborg 08	55	(15)
2024–	Stabæk	18	(2)
- * Club domestic league appearances and goals as of 1 December 2025

Kristian Fardal Opseth (born 6 January 1990) is a Norwegian footballer who plays as a striker for Stabæk.

== Career ==
Opseth started his career with Kaupanger before joining Førde.

=== Sogndal ===
He joined Sogndal in 2014, and made his debut in a 3–0 defeat against Stabæk.

=== Bodø/Glimt ===
Opseth later joined Bodø/Glimt. In 2017, he became the all-time top scorer of the Norwegian First Division, having scored 28 goals in 30 matches.

=== Erzurumspor ===
Opseth joined Turkish side Erzurumspor on 23 January 2019.

=== Adelaide ===
On 31 July 2019, Opseth joined Australian club Adelaide United. In October 2020, it was announced by Bruce Djite that Opseth had left Adelaide United.

=== Bengaluru ===
On 20 October 2020, Kristian Opseth joined Indian Super League club Bengaluru FC.

=== Sarpsborg 08 ===
On 3 March 2021, he returned to Norway, signing a two-year contract with Sarpsborg 08.

=== Stabæk ===
After Sarpsborg 08 chose not to renew Opseth's contract after the 2023 season, Stabæk announced in March 2023 that they had signed Opseth on a two-year contract.

== Career statistics ==
=== Club ===
As of 30 August 2025

Appearances and goals by club, season and competition
Club	Season	League			National cup (Note: Includes Norwegian Cup, FFA Cup)		Total	
Club	Season	Division	Apps	Goals	Apps	Goals	Apps	Goals
Førde	2012	3. divisjon	24	26	0	0	24	26
Førde	2013	2. divisjon	18	10	0	0	18	10
Førde	Total		42	36	0	0	42	36
Sogndal	2014	Tippeligaen	10	0	3	0	13	0
Sogndal	2015	1. divisjon	26	16	2	1	28	17
Sogndal	2016	Tippeligaen	18	2	3	1	21	3
Sogndal	Total		54	18	8	2	62	20
Bodø/Glimt (loan)	2017	1. divisjon	13	10	2	2	15	12
Bodø/Glimt	2017	1. divisjon	17	18	0	0	17	18
Bodø/Glimt	2018	Eliteserien	30	10	4	3	34	13
Bodø/Glimt	Total		60	38	6	5	66	43
Erzurumspor	2018–19	Süper Lig	12	1	0	0	12	1
Adelaide United	2019–20	A-League	21	6	3	0	24	6
Bengaluru	2020–21	Indian Super League	15	0	0	0	15	0
Sarpsborg 08	2021	Eliteserien	16	5	3	4	19	9
Sarpsborg 08	2022	Eliteserien	13	2	4	1	17	3
Sarpsborg 08	2023	Eliteserien	27	8	5	6	32	14
Sarpsborg 08	Total		56	15	12	11	68	26
Stabæk	2024	1. divisjon	6	1	4	3	10	4
Stabæk	2025	1. divisjon	10	1	2	1	12	2
Stabæk	Total		16	2	6	4	22	6
Career Total			276	116	35	22	311	138

== Honours ==
=== Club ===
Sogndal

- Norwegian First Division: 2015

Bodø/Glimt

- Norwegian First Division: 2017

Adelaide United

- FFA Cup: 2019

=== Individual ===
- Norwegian First Division top scorer: 2017
