= Taijo Teniste =

Estonian footballer (born 1988)

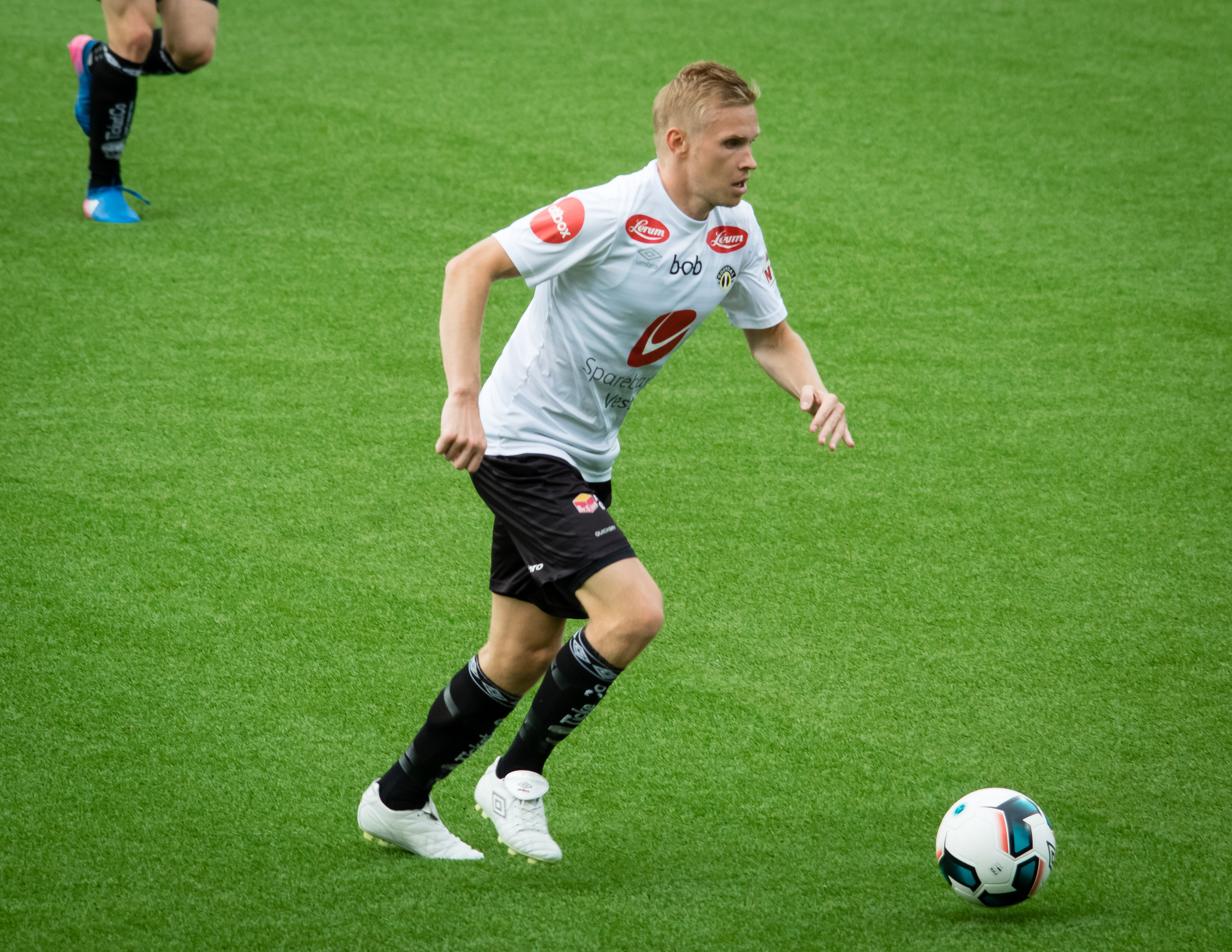
- Teniste with Sogndal in 2017

Personal information
- Full name: Taijo Teniste
- Date of birth: 31 January 1988 (age 38)
- Place of birth: Tartu, then part of Estonian SSR, Soviet Union
- Height: 1.73 m (5 ft 8 in)
- Position: Right back

Team information
- Current team: Tartu Welco
- Number: 33

Youth career
- –2004: SK 10 Premium
- 2005: Levadia

Senior career*
Years	Team	Apps	(Gls)
2004	SK 10 Premium	17	(16)
2005–2007	Levadia II	49	(15)
2005–2011	Levadia	148	(13)
2011–2017	Sogndal	164	(1)
2018–2020	Brann	59	(2)
2021–2023	Tartu Tammeka	64	(2)
2024	Tartu Welco	1	(0)
2024	Tallinna Kalev	12	(0)
2025–	Tartu Welco	52	(0)

International career^{‡}
2004	Estonia U17	7	(0)
2005	Estonia U18	1	(0)
2005–2006	Estonia U19	8	(0)
2005–2010	Estonia U21	19	(0)
2010	Estonia U23	1	(0)
2007–2025	Estonia	100	(1)
- * Club domestic league appearances and goals as of 17 November 2026 ‡ National team caps and goals as of 10 September 2025

Taijo Teniste (born 31 January 1988) is an Estonian professional footballer who plays as a right back for Estonian Esiliiga club Tartu Welco and the Estonia national team.

== Club career ==
=== SK 10 ===
Teniste came through the Spordiklubi 10 youth academy and played for the club's first team in the IV liiga.

=== Levadia ===
In January 2005, Teniste signed for Levadia. He made his debut in the Meistriliiga on 3 April 2005, in a 4–0 home victory over Merkuur Tartu. Teniste helped Levadia win four successive Meistriliiga titles in 2006, 2007, 2008 and 2009.

On 4 July 2011, Teniste joined League Two side Swindon Town for a trial, but was not offered a contract as manager Paolo Di Canio felt Teniste was not a natural left back.

=== Sogndal ===
On 1 September 2011, Teniste joined Norwegian club Sogndal on loan until the end of the season, with the option to make the deal permanent. He made his debut in the Tippeligaen on 11 September, in a 0–0 home draw against Aalesund, coming on as a substitute for Ole Jørgen Halvorsen in injury time. On 23 December 2011, Teniste signed a two-year contract with Sogndal. His contract was subsequently extended to 2015 and then to 2017. Teniste scored his first goal for Sogndal on 26 November 2017, in a 5–2 home win over Vålerenga in the last match of the 2017 season.

=== Brann ===
On 14 August 2017, it was announced that Teniste would join Brann after the 2017 season on a three-year deal.

== International career ==
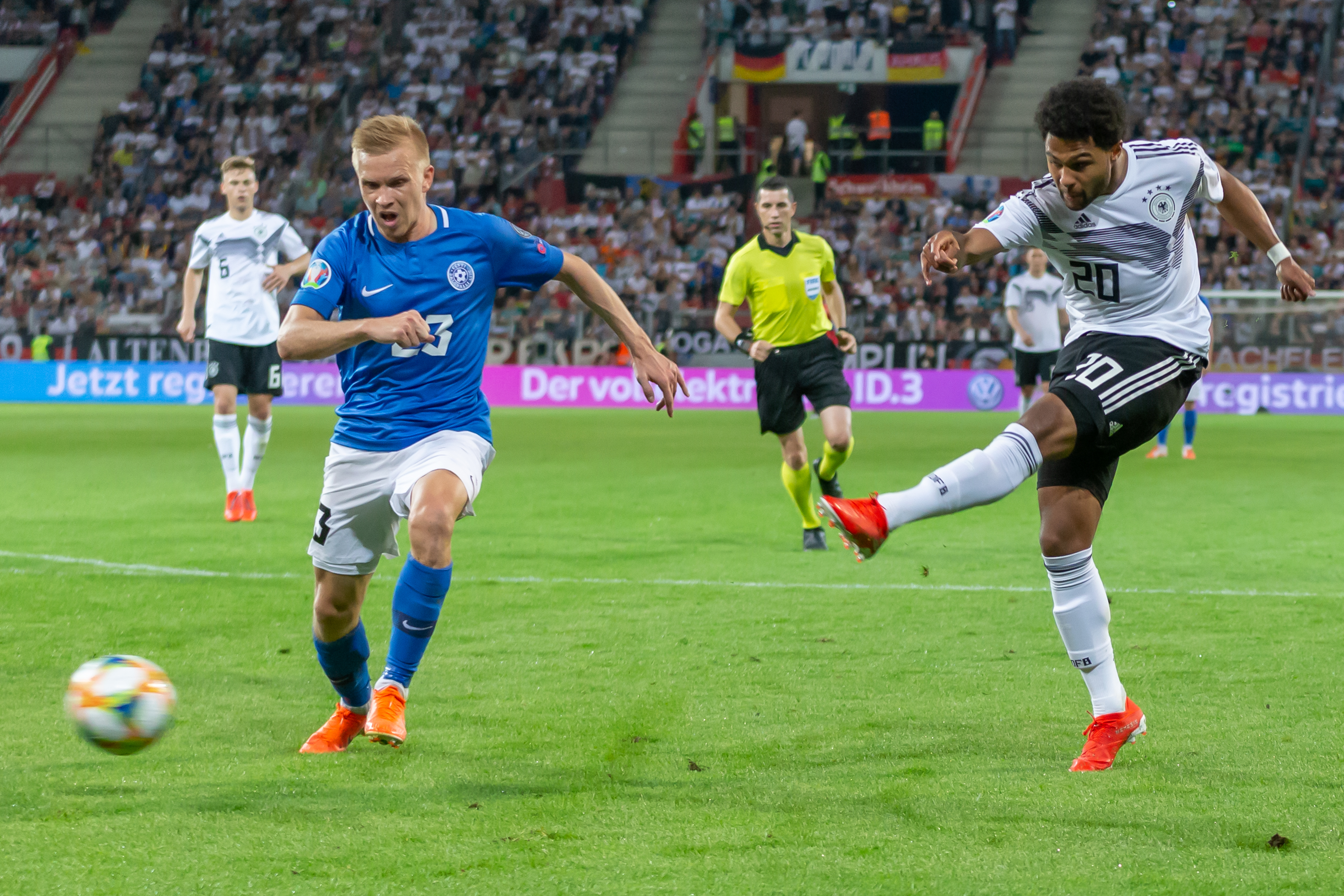
Teniste playing for Estonia against Germany in 2019

Teniste has represented Estonia at under-17, under-18, under-19, under-21 and under-23 levels.

Teniste made his senior international debut for Estonia on 9 November 2007, replacing Urmas Rooba in the 70th minute of a 0–2 away loss to Saudi Arabia in a friendly. Teniste finally scored his first goal for the national team on his 93rd cap on 26 September 2022 scoring in a 4–0 UEFA Nations League away win against San Marino. This goal also helped Estonia seal their return to the C League.

== Career statistics ==
=== Club ===
As of 8 November 2020.

Appearances and goals by club, season and competition
Club	Season	League			Cup (Note: Includes the Estonian Cup and Norwegian Cup)		Europe		Other		Total	
Club	Season	Division	Apps	Goals	Apps	Goals	Apps	Goals	Apps	Goals	Apps	Goals
SK 10 Premium	2004	IV liiga	17	16	—		—		—		17	16
Levadia II	2005	Esiliiga	16	5	—		—		—		16	5
Levadia II	2006	Esiliiga	27	5	—		—		—		27	5
Levadia II	2007	Esiliiga	6	5	—		—		—		6	5
Levadia II	Total		49	15	—		—		—		49	15
Levadia	2005	Meistriliiga	12	2	1	0	1 (Note: Appearance(s) in UEFA Champions League)	0	0	0	14	2
Levadia	2006	Meistriliiga	6	0	0	0	0	0	—		6	0
Levadia	2007	Meistriliiga	19	1	4	0	2	0	2 (Note: Appearances in Baltic League)	0	27	1
Levadia	2008	Meistriliiga	31	2	5	0	2	0	4 (Note: One appearance in Estonian Supercup, three appearances in Baltic League)	0	42	2
Levadia	2009	Meistriliiga	24	3	1	0	6 (Note: Four appearances in UEFA Champions League, two appearances in UEFA Europa League)	0	2 (Note: One appearance in Estonian Supercup, one appearance in Baltic League)	0	33	3
Levadia	2010	Meistriliiga	33	1	3	0	2	0	1 (Note: Appearance in Estonian Supercup)	0	39	1
Levadia	2011	Meistriliiga	23	4	2	0	2 (Note: Appearances in UEFA Europa League)	0	2	0	29	4
Levadia	Total		148	13	16	0	15	0	11	0	190	13
Sogndal (loan)	2011	Tippeligaen	7	0	0	0	—		—		7	0
Sogndal	2012	Tippeligaen	24	0	1	0	—		—		25	0
Sogndal	2013	Tippeligaen	30	0	2	0	—		—		32	0
Sogndal	2014	Tippeligaen	25	0	2	0	—		—		27	0
Sogndal	2015	OBOS-ligaen	25	0	2	0	—		—		27	0
Sogndal	2016	Tippeligaen	27	0	3	0	—		—		30	0
Sogndal	2017	Eliteserien	26	1	2	0	—		2 (Note: Appearances in Eliteserien relegation play-offs)	0	30	1
Sogndal	Total		164	1	12	0	—		2	0	178	1
Brann	2018	Eliteserien	23	1	1	0	—		—		24	1
Brann	2019	Eliteserien	26	1	2	0	2	1	—		30	2
Brann	2020	Eliteserien	10	0	0	0	—		—		10	0
Brann	Total		59	2	3	0	2	1	—		64	3
Career total			437	47	31	0	17	1	13	0	498	48

=== International ===
As of 09 September 2025

Appearances and goals by national team and year
National team	Year	Apps	Goals
Estonia	2007	3	0
Estonia	2009	2	0
Estonia	2010	1	0
Estonia	2011	5	0
Estonia	2012	6	0
Estonia	2013	10	0
Estonia	2014	8	0
Estonia	2015	7	0
Estonia	2016	10	0
Estonia	2017	10	0
Estonia	2018	6	0
Estonia	2019	9	0
Estonia	2020	7	0
Estonia	2021	4	0
Estonia	2022	7	1
Estonia	2023	4	0
Estonia	2024	0	0
Estonia	2025	1	0
Total		100	1

== International goals ==
No.	Date	Venue	Opponent	Score	Result	Competition
1.	26 September 2022	San Marino Stadium, Serravalle, San Marino	San Marino	2–0	4–0	2022–23 UEFA Nations League

== Honours ==
=== Club ===
Levadia II

- Esiliiga: 2006, 2007

Levadia

- Meistriliiga: 2006, 2007, 2008, 2009
- Estonian Cup: 2006–07, 2009–10
- Estonian Supercup: 2010

Sogndal

- OBOS-ligaen: 2015

== See also ==
- List of men's footballers with 100 or more international caps
