= Eivind Daniel Røed =

Norwegian footballer (born 1992)

Personal information
- Full name: Eivind Daniel Brakvatne Røed
- Date of birth: 1 January 1992 (age 34)
- Position: Defender

Youth career
- Eid
- 2008–2009: Sogndal

Senior career*
Years	Team	Apps	(Gls)
2007–2008	Eid		
2010–2013	Sogndal	15	(0)
2013	→ Fyllingsdalen (loan)		
2014	Norheimsund		
2015	Eid		
2016–	Norheimsund		

International career
2007	Norway U15	2	(0)
2008	Norway U16	13	(2)
2009	Norway U17	7	(0)
2010	Norway U18	9	(0)
2011	Norway U19	4	(0)

Managerial career
- 2014–?: Brann (academy)
- Norheimsund (player-manager)
- * Club domestic league appearances and goals

Eivind Daniel Røed (born 1 January 1992) is a retired Norwegian football defender and later manager.

He hails from Stårheim. He played for Eid IL in the 3. divisjon and represented Norway as a youth international. In the summer of 2008 he signed for Sogndal. He had trialled with SK Brann, and rejected trials at Celtic F.C. among others. He starting played for their senior team in 2010. In 2012, still only aged 20, he had major injury problems. In 2013 he was loaned out to FK Fyllingsdalen. Here, he could play in the 2. divisjon, as a central defender which he preferred, and he also knew people in the Christian milieu of the city. He moved down in the 4. divisjon in 2014 when joining Norheimsund IL. In 2015 he played for Eid, but returned to Norheimsund.

He also became an academy coach in SK Brann in 2014. He later became player-manager of Norheimsund while working as a sports teacher at Framnes Christian Upper Secondary School.
