= Magnus Stamnestrø =

Norwegian footballer (born 1992)

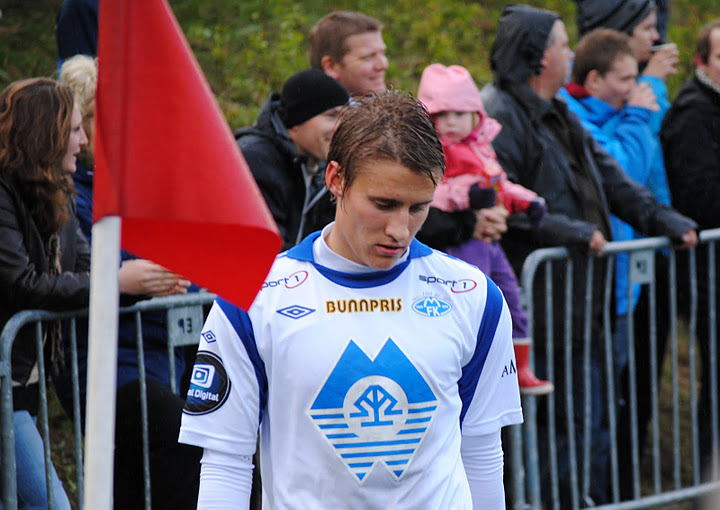
- Photo: Øistein Gjøvik

Personal information
- Full name: Magnus Stamnestrø
- Date of birth: 18 April 1992 (age 34)
- Place of birth: Kyrksæterøra, Norway
- Height: 1.75 m (5 ft 9 in)
- Position: Midfielder

Youth career
- –2010: KIL/Hemne

Senior career*
Years	Team	Apps	(Gls)
2010–2014	Molde	16	(1)
2013	→ Sogndal (loan)	19	(4)
2014	→ Kristiansund (loan)	11	(1)
2014–2015	Kristiansund	24	(4)
2015–2018	Rosenborg	17	(0)
2018–2020	Ranheim	5	(0)
2019	→ KÍ Klaksvík (loan)	9	(1)

International career^{‡}
2011	Norway U19	3	(1)
2012	Norway U21	2	(2)
- * Club domestic league appearances and goals as of 18 August 2020 ‡ National team caps and goals as of 20 April 2013

Magnus Stamnestrø (born 18 April 1992) is a former Norwegian footballer. He has represented his country at under-19 and under-21 level.

Stamnestrø transferred from KIL/Hemne to Molde FK in 2010, and made his debut in Tippeligaen the same year. He won the league with Molde in both 2011 and 2012. He was sent on a season-long loan deal to Sogndal in April 2013. In 2014, he was first sent on loan to Kristiansund BK, and after the first half of the season the loan was made into a permanent transfer. In July 2015 he bought by Rosenborg BK.

== Club career ==
Hailing from Kyrksæterøra, Stamnestrø played for KIL/Hemne while growing up and transferred to Molde in 2010. He made his debut in Tippeligaen in the 3–3 draw against Lillestrøm in the 14th round of the 2010 season. Molde were leading 3–0 when the teams had played 90 minutes, but Lillestrøm managed to score three times during the stoppage time. Stamnestrø made three appearances as a substitute in the 2011 season when Molde won the league for the first time, before he started his first match Tippeligaen-match in the last match of the season against Sogndal.

He scored his first goal in Tippeligaen in the 4–3 victory against Stabæk in October 2012. During the 2012 season, Stamnestrø played nine matches in Tippeligaen, five cup-matches and four European matches, and scored a total of five goals. Stamnestrø signed a new three-year contract with Molde in November 2012.

Stamnestrø had to have a surgery in December 2012 due to an ankle-injury, and missed the entire pre-season ahead of the 2013 season. He was sent on a season-long loan-deal in April 2013, to the Tippeligaen side Sogndal to have a better chance to play first-team football. He made his debut for Sogndal when he replaced Ruben Holsæter in the match against Rosenborg on 7 April 2013. He also came on as a substitute in the following match, and scored the match-winning goal in the 2–1 victory against Molde, which was their fourth loss in as many matches. Molde's start of the season in 2013 was the worst opening by a defending champion in Norway.

In 2014, he went on a season's loan to second-tier club Kristiansund BK, a deal that later the same year was made permanent. After 4 season at Rosenborg when he played his last game in 2016, he went to the local club Ranheim in the summer of 2018.

== International career ==
Stamnestrø got his first match for Norway at youth international level, when he played the under-19 team against Portugal U19 in February 2011 on La Manga Club in Spain. He played a total of three matches, scoring one goal for Norway U19. In October 2012, the under-19 team became the new under-21 team and Stamnestrø scored a goal in both friendly matches against Netherlands U-21. Stamnestrø was one of few that played every minute in both matches, and he was also the team's captain in one of the matches.

== Career statistics ==
=== Club ===
As of match played 13 July 2020

Appearances and goals by club, season and competition
Club	Season	League			National Cup		Europe		Total	
Club	Season	Division	Apps	Goals	Apps	Goals	Apps	Goals	Apps	Goals
Molde	2010	Eliteserien	3	0	0	0	-		3	0
Molde	2011	Eliteserien	4	0	4	0	-		8	0
Molde	2012	Eliteserien	9	1	5	2	4	0	18	3
Molde	Total		16	1	9	2	4	0	29	3
Sogndal (loan)	2013	Eliteserien	19	4	4	1	-		23	4
Sogndal (loan)	Total		19	4	4	1	-	-	23	4
Kristiansund (loan)	2014	1. divisjon	24	1	1	0	-		25	1
Kristiansund	2015	1. divisjon	11	4	3	2	-		14	6
Kristiansund	Total		35	5	4	2	-	-	39	7
Rosenborg	2015	Eliteserien	4	0	1	0	-		5	0
Rosenborg	2016	Eliteserien	13	0	4	4	-		17	4
Rosenborg	2017	Eliteserien	0	0	0	0	-		0	0
Rosenborg	2018	Eliteserien	0	0	2	1	-		2	1
Rosenborg	Total		17	0	7	5	-	-	24	5
Ranheim	2018	Eliteserien	2	0	0	0	-		2	0
Ranheim	2019	Eliteserien	1	0	1	0	-		2	0
Ranheim	2020	1. divisjon	2	0	0	0	-		2	0
Ranheim	Total		5	0	1	0	-	-	6	0
KÍ Klaksvík (loan)	2019	Betri deildin	9	1	0	0	1	0	10	1
KÍ Klaksvík (loan)	Total		9	1	0	0	1	0	10	1
Career total			101	11	25	10	5	0	131	21

== Honours ==
Molde

- Norwegian League (2): 2011, 2012

Rosenborg

- Norwegian League (2): 2015, 2016
- Norwegian Football Cup (3): 2015, 2016, 2018

KÍ Klaksvík

- Faroese Premier League (1): 2019
