= Sidy Sagna =

Senegalese footballer

Personal information
- Full name: Sidimane Sagna
- Date of birth: 4 February 1990 (age 36)
- Place of birth: Dakar, Senegal
- Height: 1.81 m (5 ft 11 in)
- Position: Defensive midfielder

Team information
- Current team: AS Domérat
- Number: 8

Youth career
- 1999–2007: ASC Yeggo

Senior career*
Years	Team	Apps	(Gls)
2008–2009	ASC Yeggo	22	(7)
2009–2010	Saint-Étienne B	42	(0)
2010–2011	Saint-Étienne	2	(0)
2013	Sogndal	28	(3)
2014–2015	Aris	12	(0)
2016–2017	US Roye-Noyon	26	(2)
2017–2018	União Madeira	15	(0)
2018	Samtredia	8	(0)
2019	Panevėžys	6	(0)
2020–2021	Sfântul Gheorghe	29	(0)
2022–	AS Domérat	26	(0)
- * Club domestic league appearances and goals as of 1 July 2023

Sidimane "Sidy" Sagna (born 4 February 1990) is a Senegalese professional footballer who plays as a defensive midfielder for French club AS Domérat.

== Career ==
Sagna was born in Dakar, Senegal. He began his career with ASC Yeggo and joined in January 2009 to Ligue 1 side AS Saint-Étienne's reserve team. On 31 May 2010, he signed a professional contract with Saint-Étienne until 30 June 2011. He played for Saint Etienne reserves during season 2011–12 and 2012–13, until signing a professional contract at Norwegian club Sogndal in January 2013. He was released after the 2013 season. In October 2019 he joined Lithuanian club FK Panevėžys.

== Career statistics ==
Season	Club	Division	League		Cup		Total	
Season	Club	Division	Apps	Goals	Apps	Goals	Apps	Goals
2013	Sogndal	Tippeligaen	28	3	1	0	29	3
Career total			28	3	1	0	29	3
