= Peter Aase =

Norwegian footballer (born 1995)

Personal information
- Full name: Peter Adrian Dinessen Aase
- Date of birth: 27 March 1995 (age 31)
- Place of birth: Florø, Norway
- Height: 1.76 m (5 ft 9 in)
- Position: Midfielder

Team information
- Current team: Førde
- Number: 28

Youth career
- –2009: Florø

Senior career*
Years	Team	Apps	(Gls)
2010–2011	Florø	5	(0)
2012–2013	Sogndal	2	(0)
2012	→ Sogndal 2	1	(0)
2012	→ Florø (loan)	8	(2)
2013	→ Florø (loan)	5	(0)
2013–2015	Florø	44	(12)
2014	→ Florø 2	2	(1)
2015–2017	Sogndal	5	(0)
2016	→ Åsane (loan)	1	(0)
2016	→ Åsane 2 (loan)	6	(1)
2016–2017	→ Florø (loan)	23	(2)
2016	→ Florø 2 (loan)	1	(0)
2017–2019	Florø	44	(2)
2017–2019	→ Florø 2	5	(1)
2019	Sotra	11	(3)
2020–2022	Lysekloster	2	(0)
2022	Førde	8	(0)
2023	Bjarg	0	(0)
2023–	Førde	6	(0)

International career
2010	Norway U15	3	(0)
2011	Norway U16	11	(1)
2012	Norway U17	9	(0)
2013	Norway U18	2	(0)
- * Club domestic league appearances and goals as of 19:18, 25 January 2024 (UTC)

Peter Aase (born 27 March 1995) is a Norwegian footballer who plays as a midfielder for Norwegian club Førde.

== Career ==
Aase made his senior debut for Florø SK in 2010. A Norway youth international, he was bought by larger neighbors Sogndal Fotball in the summer of 2012 and made his Eliteserien debut in September 2012 against Strømsgodset. In 2013 and 2014 he played for Florø, rejoining Sogndal in the summer of 2015 to play the closer of the 2015 1. divisjon. In 2016, he was loaned out to Åsane Fotball in the spring and to Florø in the autumn. The loan continued until the summer of 2017, when the move was made permanent. In mid-2019 he went on to Sotra SK, and ahead of the 2020 season was signed by Lysekloster IL. His twin brother, Stefan Aase, already played there.
