= Tim Nilsen =

Norwegian footballer (born 1992)

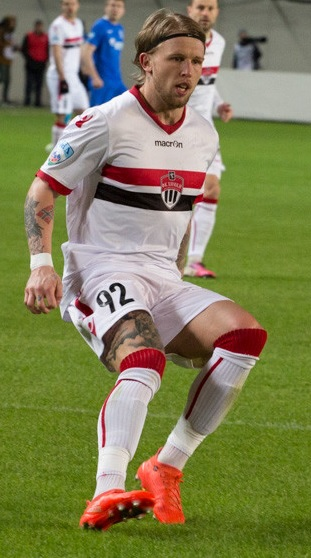
- Nilsen with Khimki in 2017

Personal information
- Full name: Tim André Nilsen
- Date of birth: 7 October 1992 (age 34)
- Place of birth: Bergen, Norway
- Height: 1.83 m (6 ft 0 in)
- Position: Striker

Team information
- Current team: Fana
- Number: 9

Youth career
- 2006–2010: Løv-Ham

Senior career*
Years	Team	Apps	(Gls)
2011	Fyllingen	22	(19)
2012–2013	Fyllingsdalen	21	(6)
2013–2014	Nest-Sotra	25	(20)
2014–2015	Sogndal	26	(5)
2015–2016	Mjøndalen	10	(1)
2015	→ Fredrikstad (loan)	14	(6)
2016	Ljungskile	24	(5)
2017	FC Khimki	9	(2)
2017	Fana	7	(4)
2018–2019	Fredrikstad	49	(28)
2020	Derry City	4	(0)
2021	Lysekloster	13	(11)
2022–	Fana	39	(44)
- * Club domestic league appearances and goals as of 19:22, 22 April 2024 (UTC)

Tim André Nilsen (born 7 October 1992) is a Norwegian footballer who plays as a striker for Norwegian Third Division side Fana IL. He has previously played for Nest-Sotra, Sogndal, Mjøndalen, Fredrikstad, Ljungskile, FC Khimki, Fana and Derry City.

== Career ==
Nilsen was born in Bergen and he started his career with Fyllingen in 2011.

Nilsen joined Sogndal in 2014. He made his debut for Sogndal in a 3–0 defeat against Stabæk.

Nilsen joined Mjøndalen in 2015.

On 13 February 2017, he signed a 2.5-year contract with the Russian club FC Khimki.

Nilsen signed for League of Ireland Premier Division side Derry City on 24 January 2020. He left the club on 1 July 2020 after making 4 appearances. In 2021 he began playing for Lysekloster.

== Career statistics ==
=== Club ===
As of 21 March 2021

Appearances and goals by club, season and competition
Club	Season	League			National Cup		League Cup		Europe		Total	
Club	Season	Division	Apps	Goals	Apps	Goals	Apps	Goals	Apps	Goals	Apps	Goals
Fyllingen	2011	3. divisjon	22	19	1	0	—		—		23	19
Fyllingsdalen	2012	2. divisjon	21	6	1	0	—		—		22	6
Nest-Sotra	2013	2. divisjon	25	20	2	3	—		—		27	23
Sogndal	2014	Tippeligaen	26	5	4	2	—		—		30	7
Mjøndalen	2015	Tippeligaen	10	1	3	1	—		—		13	2
Fredrikstad (loan)	2015	1. divisjon	14	6	0	0	—		—		14	6
Ljungskile	2016	Superettan	24	5	3	4	—		—		27	9
Khimki	2016–17	Russian Football National League	9	2	0	0	—		—		9	2
Fana	2017	2. divisjon	7	4	0	0	—		—		7	4
Fredrikstad	2018	2. divisjon	25	13	2	1	—		—		27	14
Fredrikstad	2019	2. divisjon	24	15	2	3	—		—		26	18
Fredrikstad	Fredrikstad Total		63	34	4	4	—		—		67	38
Derry City	2020	League of Ireland Premier Division	4	0	0	0	0	0	0 (Note: Appearances in UEFA Europa League)	0	4	0
Career Total			211	96	18	14	0	0	0	0	229	110
