= Espen Næss Lund =

Norwegian footballer (born 1985)

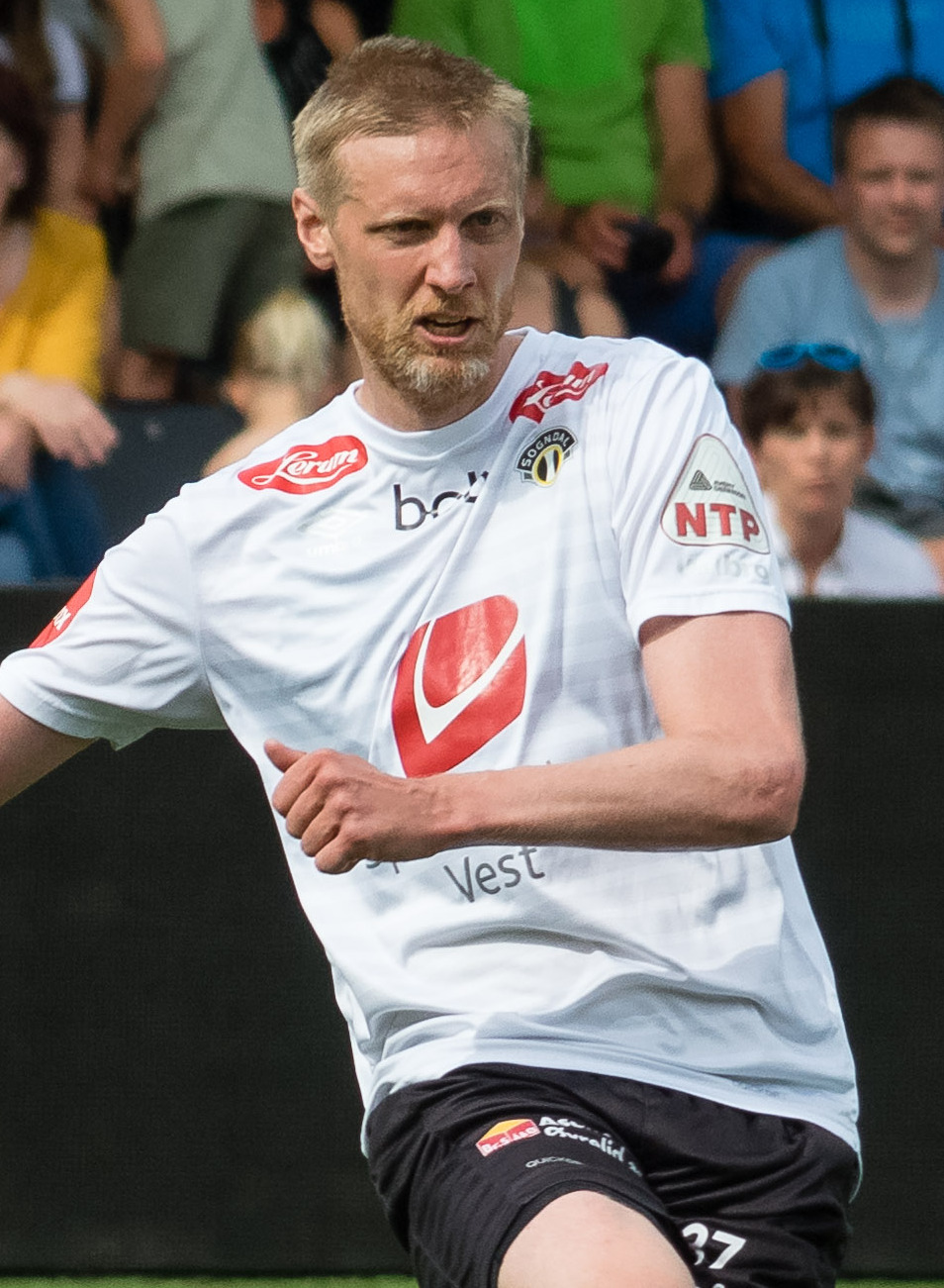
- Næss Lund in 2017

Personal information
- Full name: Espen Næss Lund
- Date of birth: 7 May 1985 (age 41)
- Place of birth: Tønsberg, Norway
- Height: 1.95 m (6 ft 5 in)
- Positions: Striker; defender

Youth career
- Ivrig
- Tønsberg
- Vålerenga

Senior career*
Years	Team	Apps	(Gls)
2003	Vålerenga	3	(0)
2004–2010	Tønsberg		
2011–2013	Sogndal	19	(0)
2012	→ Strømmen (loan)	11	(0)
2014–2016	Kristiansund	68	(4)
2017	Sogndal	9	(0)
2019	Dahle		

International career
2001	Norway U16	9	(4)
2002	Norway U17	6	(0)
2003	Norway U18	8	(2)
2004	Norway U19	3	(0)

Managerial career
- 2020–: Re
- * Club domestic league appearances and goals as of 1 January 2018

Espen Næss Lund (born 7 May 1985) is a retired Norwegian football player.

In 2020 he started his manager career as head coach of Re FK.

== Career statistics ==
As of 6 August 2017

Club	Season	Division	League		Cup		Total	
Club	Season	Division	Apps	Goals	Apps	Goals	Apps	Goals
2011	Sogndal	Eliteserien	5	0	1	0	6	0
2012	Sogndal	Eliteserien	2	0	0	0	2	0
2012	Strømmen	1. divisjon	11	0	0	0	11	0
2013	Sogndal	Eliteserien	12	0	3	2	15	2
2014	Kristiansund	1. divisjon	24	3	3	0	27	3
2015	Kristiansund	1. divisjon	25	1	3	1	28	2
2016	Kristiansund	1. divisjon	19	0	0	0	19	0
2017	Sogndal	Eliteserien	9	0	2	1	11	1
Career Total			107	4	12	4	119	8
