= Fosshaugane Campus =

Football stadium in Norway

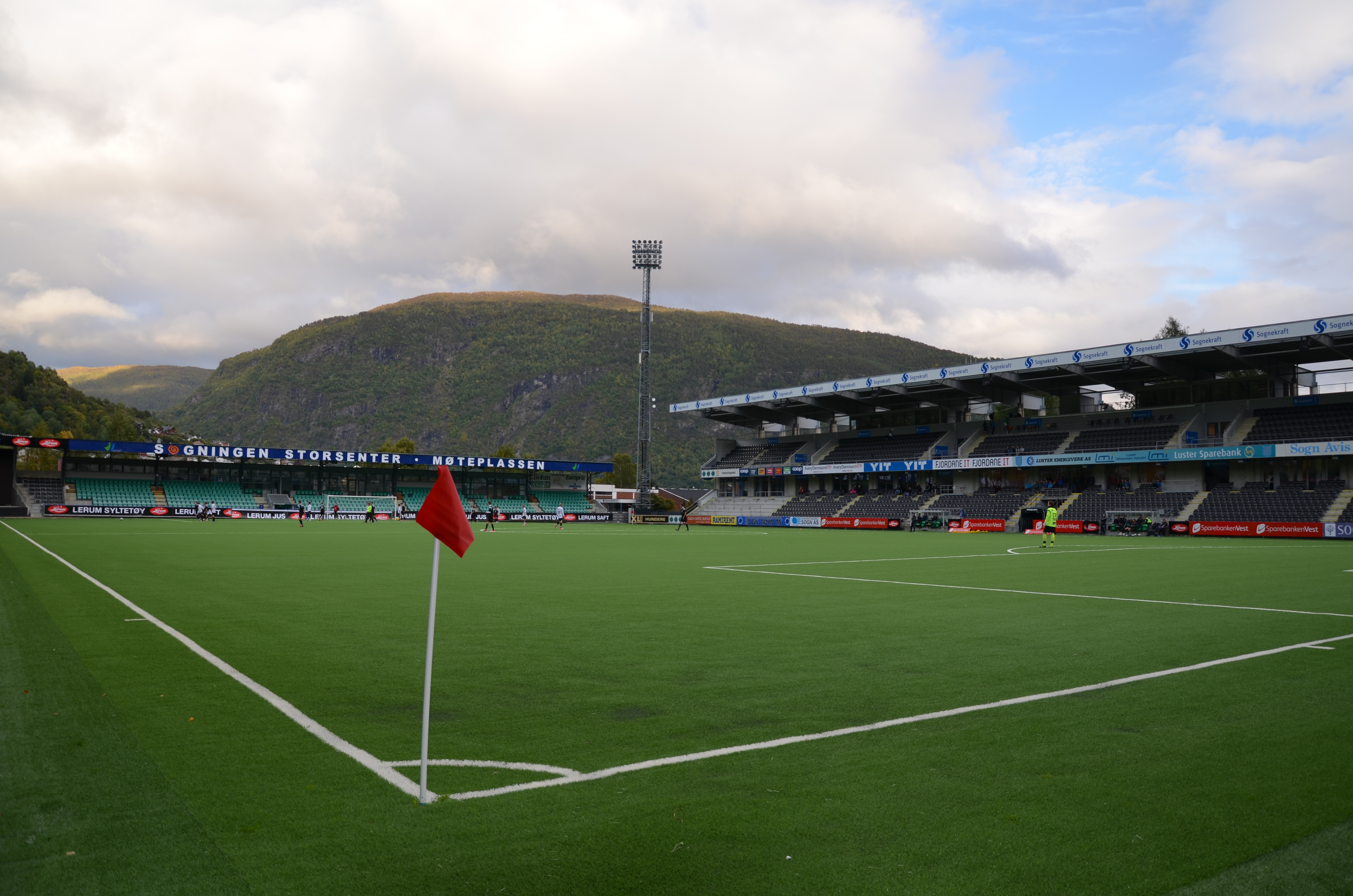
- Interactive map of Fosshaugane Campus
- Former names: Fosshaugane Stadion
- Location: Sogndalsfjøra, Vestland county, Norway
- Coordinates: 61°13′54″N 7°5′9″E
- Owner: Sogndal Fotball
- Operator: Sogndal Fotball
- Capacity: 5,622
- Surface: Artificial turf (from May 2012)
- Record attendance: 7,000 (5 September 1976)
- Field size: 105 × 68 m

Construction
- Groundbreaking: December 2004
- Opened: 7 July 2006

Tenant
- Sogndal Fotball (2006–present)

Fosshaugane Campus is the current home ground for the football team, Sogndal Fotball. It is also a combined with a school's campus, from where it got its name.

The stadium was inaugurated on 7 July 2006 when Sogndal beat Bryne 2–0. In a 2012 survey carried out by the Norwegian Players' Association among away-team captains, Fosshaugane was ranked lowest amongst league stadiums, with a score of 1.93 on a scale from one to five.

== Facts ==
- Capacity: 5,622
- Record attendance: 7,000 (Sogndal – Start, 5 September 1976)
- Opening game: 7 July 2006 (Sogndal – Bryne)
