= Kenneth Udjus =

Norwegian footballer (born 1983)

Personal information
- Full name: Nils Kenneth Udjus
- Date of birth: 2 July 1983 (age 43)
- Place of birth: Kristiansand, Norway
- Height: 1.93 m (6 ft 4 in)
- Position: Goalkeeper

Team information
- Current team: Asker
- Number: 1

Youth career
- Hånes
- Start
- Vigør

Senior career*
Years	Team	Apps	(Gls)
2004	Arendal	23	(0)
2004	Tromsø	0	(0)
2005–2006	Tønsberg	18	(0)
2006	Arendal	11	(0)
2007–2011	Brann	15	(0)
2007	→ Løv-Ham (loan)	22	(0)
2011–2012	Sogndal	55	(0)
2013–2015	Lillestrøm	22	(0)
2014	→ Sogndal (loan)	6	(0)
2015–2016	Brann	9	(0)
2016	IFK Norrköping	0	(0)
2017–2018	Asker	15	(0)
- * Club domestic league appearances and goals as of 25 March 2019

Kenneth Udjus (born 2 July 1983) is a retired Norwegian professional footballer who last played as a goalkeeper for Asker.

== Youth career ==
Udjus played as a defender as a junior in IK Start, until Thomas Gill discovered his goalkeeping abilities by chance when Udjus was 17.

In the 2012 season he kept a clean sheet for 558 minutes, which at the time was a record in the Norwegian top division. The record has since been broken by Sondre Rossbach (730 minutes).

== Other ==
He is the grandson of the Norwegian politician Ragnar Udjus.

== Career statistics ==
As of 12 June 2017

Appearances and goals by club, season and competition
Club	Season	League			Cup		Total	
Club	Season	Division	Apps	Goals	Apps	Goals	Apps	Goals
Brann	2007	Tippeligaen	0	0	0	0	0	0
Brann	2008	Tippeligaen	6	0	0	0	6	0
Brann	2009	Tippeligaen	9	0	3	0	12	0
Brann	2010	Tippeligaen	0	0	2	0	2	0
Brann	Total		15	0	5	0	20	0
Løv-Ham (loan)	2007	Adeccoligaen	22	0	0	0	22	0
Sogndal	2011	Tippeligaen	25	0	4	0	29	0
Sogndal	2012	Tippeligaen	30	0	0	0	30	0
Sogndal	Total		55	0	4	0	59	0
Lillestrøm	2013	Tippeligaen	22	0	1	0	23	0
Lillestrøm	2014	Tippeligaen	0	0	2	0	2	0
Lillestrøm	Total		22	0	3	0	25	0
Sogndal (loan)	2014	Tippeligaen	6	0	0	0	6	0
Brann	2015	1. divisjon	9	0	1	0	10	0
Norrköping	2016	Allsvenskan	0	0	0	0	0	0
Asker	2017	2. divisjon	14	0	0	0	14	0
Asker	2018	2. divisjon	1	0	0	0	1	0
Asker	Total		15	0	0	0	15	0
Career total			144	0	13	0	157	0

== Honours ==
- Kniksen award: Goalkeeper of the year (2012)
