= Ørjan Hopen =

Norwegian footballer (born 1992)

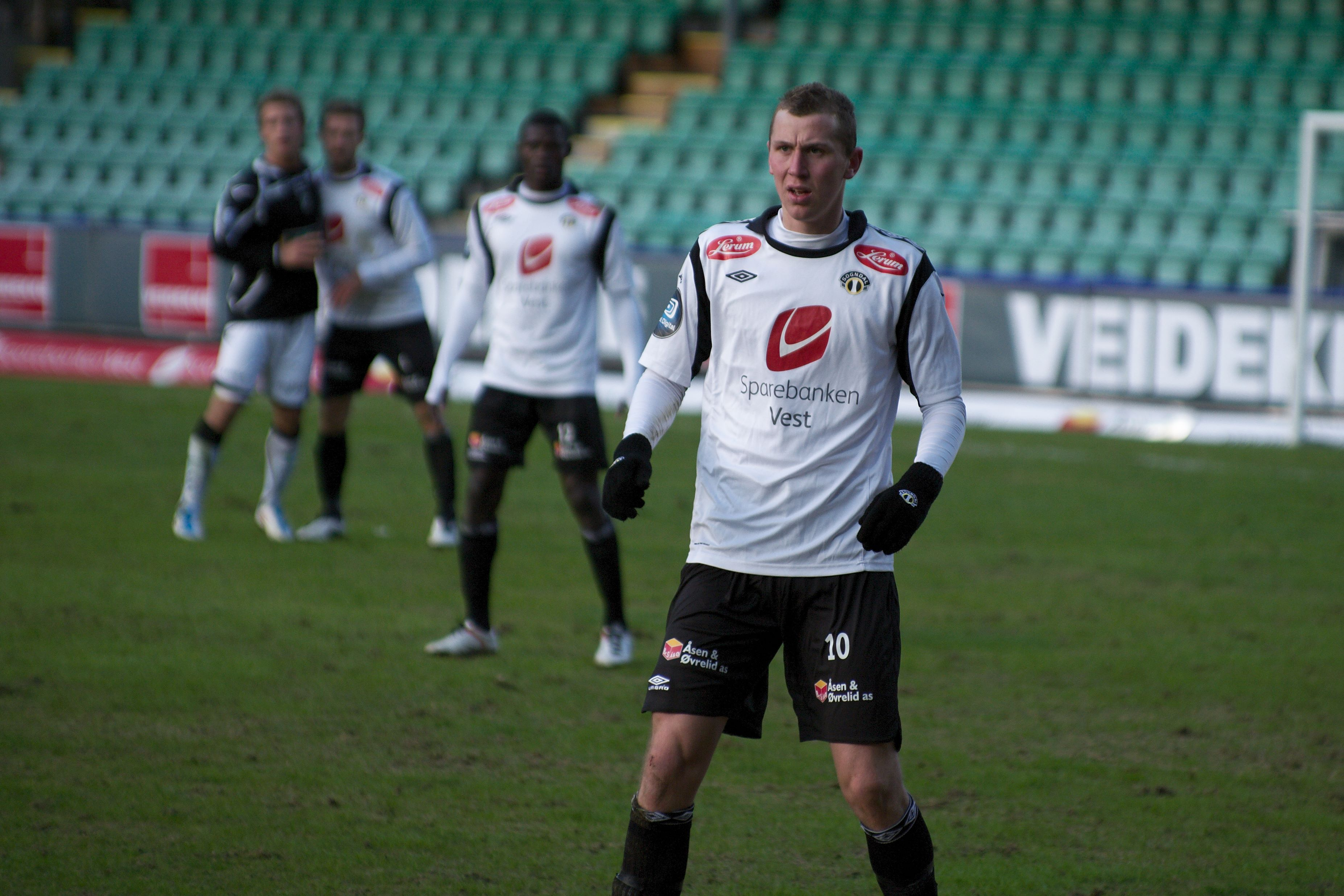

Personal information
- Full name: Ørjan Hopen
- Date of birth: 19 March 1992 (age 34)
- Place of birth: Sogndal, Norway
- Height: 1.80 m (5 ft 11 in)
- Position: Midfielder

Team information
- Current team: Raumnes & Årnes (player-manager)

Senior career*
Years	Team	Apps	(Gls)
2008–2014	Sogndal	68	(9)
2013	→ Bryne (loan)	8	(1)
2014	→ Nest-Sotra (loan)	13	(2)
2015–2016	Levanger	52	(10)
2017	Skeid	13	(2)
2018–2022	Funnefoss/Vormsund IL	50	(16)
2023	Bøn		
2024–	Raumnes & Årnes		

Managerial career
- 2023: Bøn (player-manager)
- 2023: Eidsvold Turn (assistant)
- 2024–: Raumnes & Årnes (player-manager)
- * Club domestic league appearances and goals as of 31 May 2024

Ørjan Hopen (born 19 March 1992) is a Norwegian football midfielder who currently plays for Raumnes & Årnes IL.

== Personal life ==
He is the son of former Sogndal player Arild Hopen.

== Club career ==
He was brought up in the Sogndal system and signed his first professional contract in 2008. He scored his first competitive goal for Sogndal in his first competitive match against Smørås IL when he came on as a substitute in the 74th minute and scoring his goal at the 83rd minute mark in the First Round of the 2009 Norwegian Football Cup. He made his debut in Tippeligaen against Strømsgodset with another sub appearance in the first round of the 2011 season on 20 March 2011.

After a couple of years in second-tier Levanger he left ahead of the 2017 season. After three months as a free agent he signed for third-tier Skeid.

Ahead of the 2018 season he joined Funnefoss/Vormsund IL in the Norwegian Fourth Division. He stayed here until the 2022 season was over, and was subsequently announced as player-manager of Fifth Division team Bøn FK and assistant manager of ambitious Third Division team Eidsvold Turn. In 2024 he moved on to Raumnes & Årnes IL, having taken up residence in Fjellfoten.

== Career statistics ==
Season	Club	Division	League		Cup		Total	
Season	Club	Division	Apps	Goals	Apps	Goals	Apps	Goals
2009	Sogndal	1. divisjon	0	0	2	1	2	1
2010	Sogndal	1. divisjon	14	0	1	0	15	0
2011	Sogndal	Eliteserien	20	6	2	0	22	6
2012	Sogndal	Eliteserien	26	2	1	0	27	2
2013	Sogndal	Eliteserien	2	0	1	0	3	0
2013	Bryne	1. divisjon	8	1	0	0	8	1
2014	Sogndal	Eliteserien	6	1	2	1	8	2
2014	Nest-Sotra	1. divisjon	13	2	0	0	13	2
2015	Levanger	1. divisjon	26	5	3	0	29	5
2016	Levanger	1. divisjon	26	5	0	0	26	5
2017	Skeid	2. divisjon	7	1	2	0	9	1
Career Total			148	23	14	2	162	25
