= Malick Mané =

Senegalese footballer

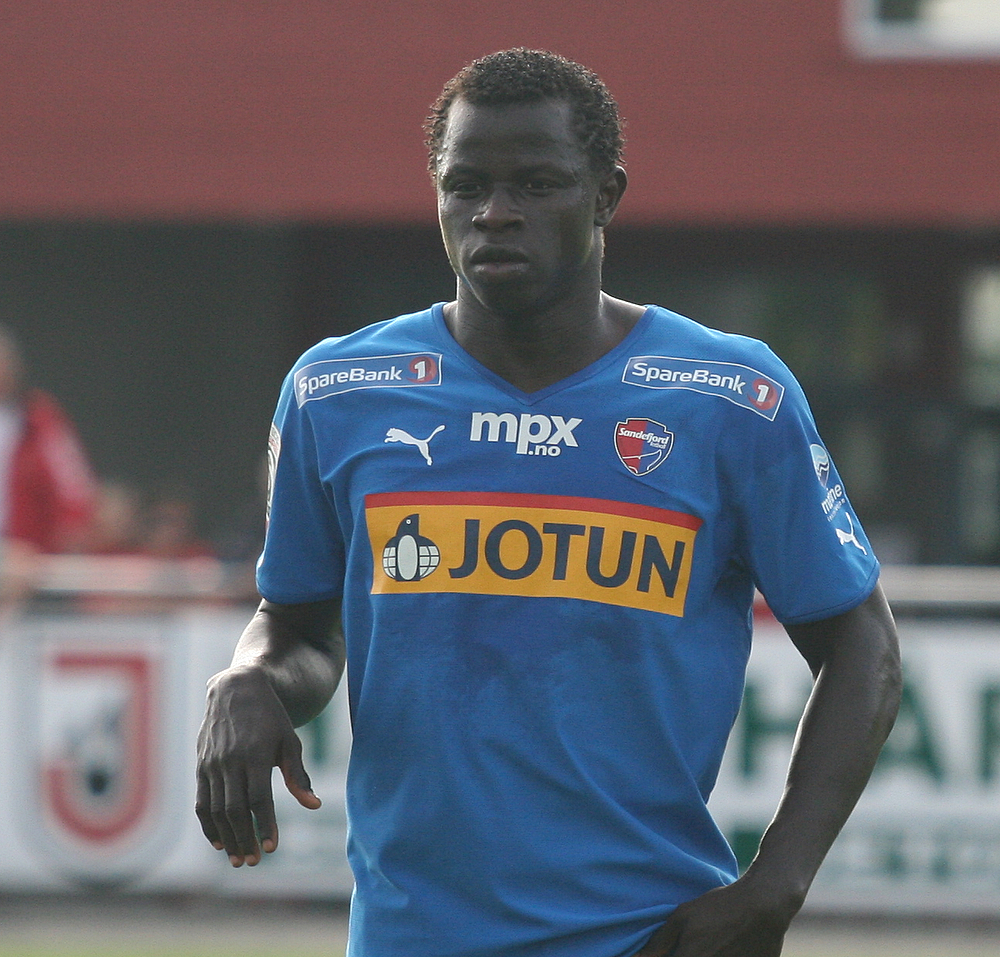
- Mané playing for Sandefjord in 2008

Personal information
- Full name: Malick Neme Mané
- Date of birth: 14 October 1988 (age 38)
- Place of birth: Ziguinchor, Senegal
- Height: 1.73 m (5 ft 8 in)
- Positions: Forward; winger

Youth career
- –2005: Casa Sports

Senior career*
Years	Team	Apps	(Gls)
2005–2007	Casa Sports		
2008–2011	Sandefjord	82	(19)
2011	→ Aktobe (loan)	29	(12)
2012–2014	Sogndal	59	(12)
2014–2015	IFK Göteborg	11	(1)
2014	→ Central Coast Mariners (loan)	4	(0)
2015	→ Hønefoss BK (loan)	22	(5)
2015	→ Najran (loan)	8	(0)
2016	Taraz	30	(13)
2017	Nei Mongol Zhongyou	14	(1)
2017	Taraz	12	(3)
2018	Akzhayik	27	(9)
2019	Laçi	13	(0)
2019	Atyrau	4	(0)
2021-2022	ASAC Ndiambour		
2022–	Cetinkaya TSK		

International career
2012	Senegal	1	(0)
- * Club domestic league appearances and goals

Malick Neme Mané (born 14 October 1988) is a Senegalese former professional footballer who plays as a forward.

== Career ==
=== Aktobe ===
In February 2011, Mané moved to Kazakhstan, signing a year-long loan contract with Kazakhstan Premier League side FC Aktobe. Aktobe also had the option to buy Mané at the end of his loan deal for $1 million.

=== Sogndal ===
In February 2012, Mané joined Sogndal Fotball on a two-year contract.

=== IFK Göteborg ===
On 12 March 2014, Mané signed a four-year contract with Swedish Allsvenskan side IFK Göteborg.

In July 2014, Mané joined A-League side Central Coast Mariners on a season-long loan from IFK Göteborg. Mané returned to Sweden in December after failing to settle in Australia. Shortly after returning from Australia, Mané signed a one-year loan deal with Norwegian OBOS-ligaen side Hønefoss. In September 2015, Mané's loan deal with Hønefoss was cut short and he was sent on loan to Saudi Professional League side Najran SC until 15 July 2016.

On 13 February 2016, Mané's contract with IFK Göteborg was terminated.

=== Taraz ===
Following his release from IFK Göteborg, Mané went on trial with Kazakhstan Premier League side FC Taraz in late February, signing for them on 26 February 2016.

=== Atyrau ===
On 3 July 2019, Mané returned to Kazakhstan, signing for FC Atyrau.

== Career statistics ==
=== Club ===
As of match played 11 November 2018

Appearances and goals by club, season and competition
Club	Season	League			National cup		League cup		Continental		Other		Total	
Club	Season	Division	Apps	Goals	Apps	Goals	Apps	Goals	Apps	Goals	Apps	Goals	Apps	Goals
Sandefjord	2008	Adeccoligaen	28	6	0	0	–		–		–		0	0
Sandefjord	2009	Tippeligaen	28	8	2	1	–		–		–		0	0
Sandefjord	2010	Tippeligaen	26	5	4	2	–		–		–		0	0
Sandefjord	Total		82	19	6	3	0	0	0	0	0	0	88	22
Aktobe	2011	Kazakhstan Premier League	29	12	1	0	–		4	2	–		34	14
Sogndal	2012	Tippeligaen	30	2	0	0	–		–		–		30	2
Sogndal	2013	Tippeligaen	29	10	3	4	–		–		–		32	14
Sogndal	Total		59	12	3	4	0	0	0	0	0	0	62	16
IFK Göteborg	2014	Allsvenskan	11	1	1	0	–		1	0	–		13	1
IFK Göteborg	2015	Allsvenskan	0	0	0	0	–		0	0	–		0	0
IFK Göteborg	Total		11	1	1	0	0	0	1	0	0	0	13	1
Central Coast Mariners (loan)	2014–15	A-League	4	0	2	0	–		–		–		6	0
Hønefoss (loan)	2015	OBOS-ligaen	22	5	4	6	–		–		–		26	11
Najran (loan)	2015–16	Jameel League	5	0	0	0	–		–		–		5	0
Taraz	2016	Kazakhstan Premier League	30	13	0	0	–		–		–		30	13
Nei Mongol Zhongyou	2017	China League One	14	0	1	1	–		–		–		15	1
Taraz	2017	Kazakhstan Premier League	12	1	0	0	–		–		–		12	3
Akzhayik	2018	Kazakhstan Premier League	27	9	1	0	–		–		–		28	9
Career total			295	74	19	14	0	0	5	2	0	0	319	90

=== International ===
Appearances and goals by national team and year
National team	Year	Apps	Goals
Senegal	2012	1	0
Total		1	0
