= Bjørn Inge Utvik =

Norwegian footballer (born 1996)

Personal information
- Full name: Bjørn Inge Utvik
- Date of birth: 28 February 1996 (age 30)
- Place of birth: Avaldsnes, Norway
- Height: 1.82 m (6 ft 0 in)
- Position: Centre-back

Team information
- Current team: Sarpsborg 08
- Number: 4

Youth career
- Haugesund

Senior career*
Years	Team	Apps	(Gls)
2012	Haugesund	0	(0)
2013–2018	Sogndal	93	(5)
2018–2023	Sarpsborg 08	122	(7)
2024–2025	Vancouver Whitecaps FC	30	(0)
2025–	Sarpsborg 08	25	(0)

International career^{‡}
2013	Norway U17	5	(0)
2013–2014	Norway U18	15	(3)
2014–2015	Norway U19	5	(1)
2014–2018	Norway U21	7	(1)
- * Club domestic league appearances and goals as of 23 July 2026 ‡ National team caps and goals as of 12 September 2018

Bjørn Inge Utvik (born 28 February 1996) is a Norwegian footballer who plays as a centre-back for Sarpsborg 08 in Eliteserien. He has previously played for Haugesund, Sogndal and Vancouver Whitecaps FC.

== Career ==
Utvik was born in Avaldsnes and he started his career with FK Haugesund.

Utvik joined Sogndal in 2013. He made his debut for Sogndal in a 3–1 defeat against Strømsgodset.

On 30 January 2024, Utvik (known for wearing a helmet due to a head injury) was announced at Vancouver Whitecaps FC on a one-year contract with the option of a further year.

== Career statistics ==
As of 13 November 2022

Season	Club	Division	League		Cup		Europe		Total	
Season	Club	Division	Apps	Goals	Apps	Goals	Apps	Goals	Apps	Goals
2012	Haugesund	Tippeligaen	0	0	1	0	—		1	0
2013	Sogndal	Tippeligaen	10	0	1	0	—		11	0
2014	Sogndal	Tippeligaen	24	1	4	1	—		28	2
2015	Sogndal	OBOS-ligaen	25	3	3	0	—		28	3
2016	Sogndal	Tippeligaen	20	1	0	0	—		20	1
2017	Sogndal	Eliteserien	14	0	1	0	—		15	0
2018	Sarpsborg 08	Eliteserien	9	0	3	1	3	0	15	1
2019	Sarpsborg 08	Eliteserien	10	1	0	0	—		10	1
2020	Sarpsborg 08	Eliteserien	28	2	0	0	—		28	2
2021	Sarpsborg 08	Eliteserien	28	0	1	0	—		29	0
2022	Sarpsborg 08	Eliteserien	20	0	2	0	—		22	0
2023	Sarpsborg 08	Eliteserien	27	4	4	0			31	4
2024	Vancouver Whitecaps	MLS	13	0						
Career Total			188	8	16	2	3	0	207	10
