= Jonas Olsson (footballer, born 1970) =

Swedish footballer and manager

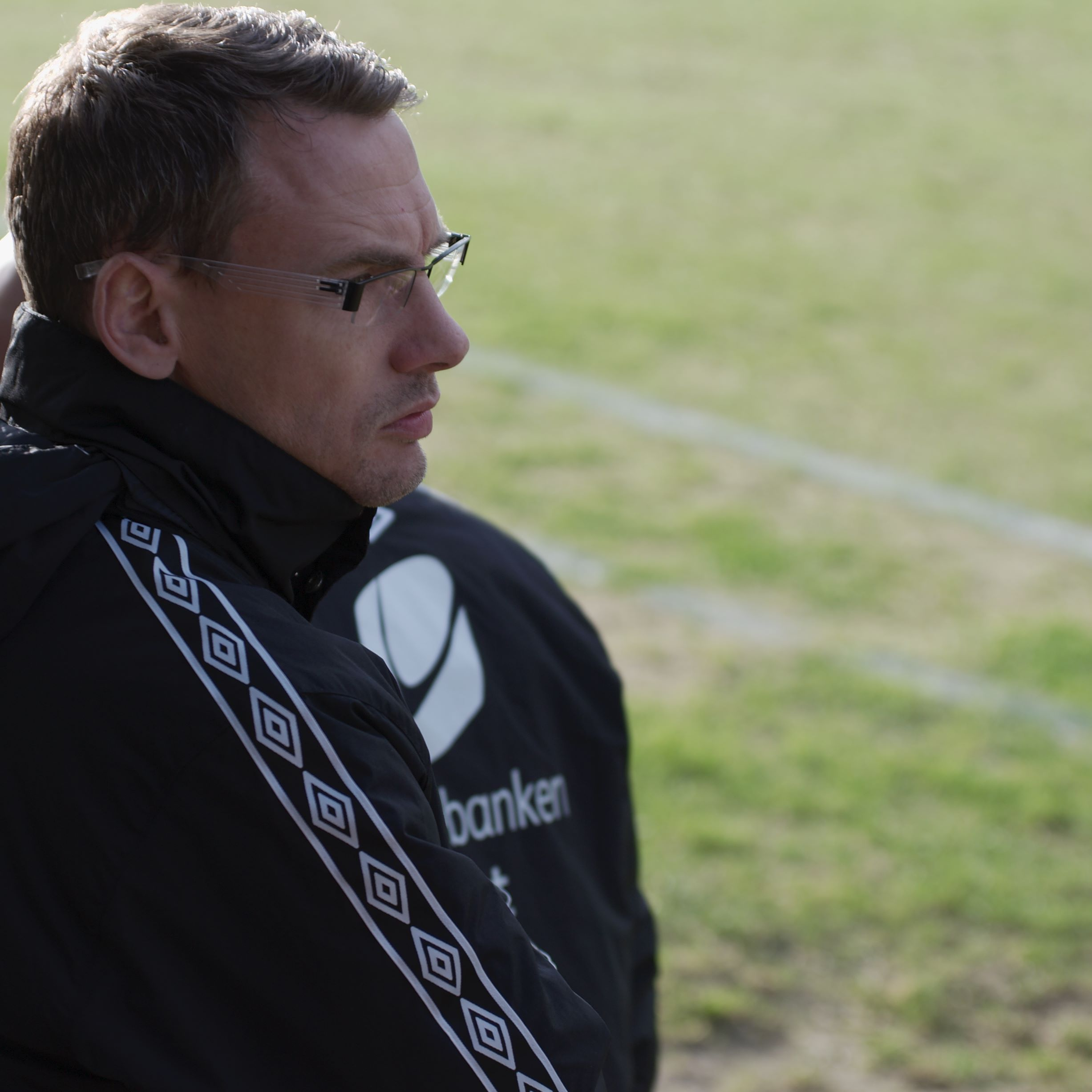

Personal information
- Date of birth: 14 January 1970 (age 56)
- Place of birth: Gothenburg, Sweden
- Position: Defender

Senior career*
Years	Team	Apps	(Gls)
1989–1998	IFK Göteborg	113	(6)

International career
1986	Sweden U17	9	(0)
1986–1988	Sweden U19	10	(1)
1990	Sweden U21	2	(0)

Managerial career
- 2004–2007: FC Trollhättan
- 2007–2011: IFK Göteborg
- 2012–2014: Sogndal
- 2015: Ullensaker/Kisa
- 2015–2016: Ljungskile
- * Club domestic league appearances and goals

Jonas Olsson (born 14 January 1970) is a Swedish football manager and former player. Olsson is currently director of youth academy for IFK Göteborg.

== Playing career ==
He played 266 official games for IFK Göteborg during his career as a player, won six Swedish Championships, and played in the UEFA Champions League. He also represented the Sweden U17, U19, and U21 teams.

== Coaching career ==
He managed IFK Göteborg together with Stefan Rehn from 2007 to 2011. On 4 October 2011, he agreed to take over as coach of Sogndal from the 2012-season.

== Honours ==
Individual

- Årets Ärkeängel: 1995
