= Rune Bolseth =

Norwegian footballer (born 1980)

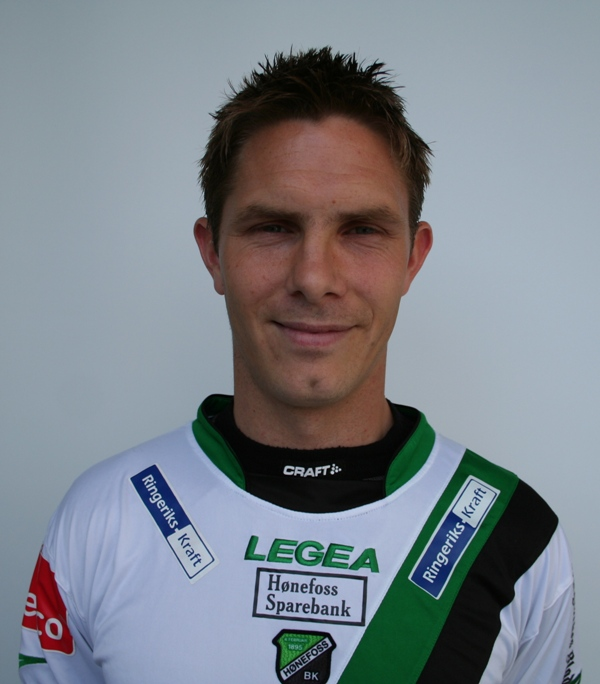

Personal information
- Date of birth: 4 July 1980 (age 46)
- Place of birth: Gloppen, Norway
- Height: 1.75 m (5 ft 9 in)
- Position: Midfielder

Youth career
- 1994–1999: Sandane TIL

Senior career*
Years	Team	Apps	(Gls)
1999–2009	Sogndal	266	(33)
2010–2012	Hønefoss	67	(9)
2013–2017	Sogndal	104	(3)

Managerial career
- 2020–: Sogndal (assistant)
- * Club domestic league appearances and goals as of 3 November 2016

Rune Bolseth (born 4 July 1980) is a retired Norwegian footballer who played as a midfielder.

== Career ==
Bolseth was born in Gloppen Municipality in Sogn og Fjordane county and he started his career with Sogndal in 1999. He made his debut against Hødd in a 1–2 loss on 1 August 1999.

Bolseth joined Hønefoss in 2010 after ten years in Sogndal. He made his debut for Hønefoss in a 1–2 loss against Tromsø.

== Career statistics ==
As of 3 November 2016

Season	Club	Division	League		Cup		Total	
Season	Club	Division	Apps	Goals	Apps	Goals	Apps	Goals
1999	Sogndal	Adeccoligaen	11	1	0	0	11	1
2000	Sogndal	Adeccoligaen	25	4	0	0	25	4
2001	Sogndal	Tippeligaen	26	6	3	2	29	8
2002	Sogndal	Tippeligaen	25	6	2	2	27	8
2003	Sogndal	Tippeligaen	19	2	1	0	20	2
2004	Sogndal	Tippeligaen	24	1	3	0	27	1
2005	Sogndal	Adeccoligaen	29	4	0	0	29	4
2006	Sogndal	Adeccoligaen	30	3	1	0	31	3
2007	Sogndal	Adeccoligaen	29	2	0	0	29	2
2008	Sogndal	Adeccoligaen	23	3	0	0	23	3
2009	Sogndal	Adeccoligaen	25	1	2	0	27	1
2010	Hønefoss	Tippeligaen	15	0	3	0	18	0
2011	Hønefoss	Adeccoligaen	29	7	3	0	32	7
2012	Hønefoss	Tippeligaen	23	2	1	0	24	2
2013	Sogndal	Tippeligaen	26	2	2	0	28	2
2014	Sogndal	Tippeligaen	27	0	2	0	29	0
2015	Sogndal	OBOS-ligaen	26	1	2	0	28	1
2016	Sogndal	Tippeligaen	24	0	2	1	26	1
Career Total			436	44	27	5	463	49
