= Ruben Holsæter =

Norwegian footballer (born 1991)

Personal information
- Full name: Ruben Digernes Holsæter
- Date of birth: 20 April 1991 (age 35)
- Position: Midfielder

Team information
- Current team: Førde
- Number: 10

Senior career*
Years	Team	Apps	(Gls)
2007–2011	Førde		
2009	→ Jølster (loan)		
2011–2016	Sogndal	82	(4)
2017–	Førde		
- * Club domestic league appearances and goals

Ruben Holsæter (born 20 April 1991) is a Norwegian football midfielder.

He has played his entire career for Førde IL, except from a spell in Jølster IL in 2009 and the period mid-2011 to 2016 when he played for Sogndal. Holsæter got 93 Sogndal games and 6 goals across all competitions, among those 73 Eliteserien games and 2 goals.
