= Tenden =

Tenden is a surname. Notable people with the surname include:

- Asbjørn Tenden (born 1975), Norwegian footballer
- Borghild Tenden (born 1951), Norwegian politician
- Steinar Tenden (born 1978), Norwegian footballer, brother of Asbjørn
