= Flo, Norway =

Village in Stryn Municipality, Norway

Flo
- Village
- Interactive map of Flo
- Location within Vestland Location within Norway
- Coordinates: 61.9456°N 7.0247°E
- Country: Norway
- Region: Western Norway
- County: Vestland
- District: Nordfjord
- Municipality: Stryn Municipality
- Elevation: 74 m (243 ft)
- Time zone: UTC+01:00 (CET)
  - Summer (DST): UTC+02:00 (CEST)
- Post Code: 6783 Stryn

Flo is a small village in Stryn Municipality in Vestland county, Norway. It is located on the northern shore of the lake Oppstrynsvatn, about 18 kilometres (11 mi) east of the municipal center of Stryn. Directly south across the lake is the Jostedalsbreen nasjonalparksenter, a visitor center for the nearby Jostedalsbreen National Park.

== Notable people ==
Flo has become famous as the ancestral home of national and international footballers, all of whom are related: The brothers Kjell Rune Flo, Jostein Flo, Tore André Flo, and Jarle Flo, all of whom grew up in nearby Stryn, as well as their cousin Håvard Flo who grew up in Flo. In addition Kjell Rune's son Ulrik Flo and Håvard's nephew Per Egil Flo have played for Sogndal Fotball in the Tippeligaen. Per Egil Flo now plays for Slavia Prague. All in all, seven members of the Flo family have played in Tippeligaen, and four (Jostein, Håvard, Tore André and Per Egil) have played for Norway's national team.
