= Sweden national football team records and statistics =

The following is a list of the Sweden men's national football team's competitive records and statistics.

== Honours ==
Competition	1st place, gold medalist(s)	2nd place, silver medalist(s)	3rd place, bronze medalist(s)	Total
World Cup	0	1	2	3
European Championship	0	0	1	1
Olympic Games	1	0	2	3
Nations League	0	0	0	0
Total	1	1	5	7

=== Major titles ===
- FIFA World Cup
  - Runners-up (1): 1958
  - Third place (2): 1950, 1994
  - Fourth place (1): 1938
- UEFA European Championship
  - Semi-finals (1): 1992
- Olympic football tournament
  - Gold Medal (1): 1948
  - Bronze Medal (2): 1924, 1952

=== Minor titles ===
- Nordic Football Championship
  - Winners (9): 1933–36, 1937–47, 1948–51, 1952–55, 1956–59, 1960–63, 1964–67, 1968–71, 1972–77

== Individual records ==
=== Player records ===
As of 19 November 2023
Players in bold are still active with Sweden.

==== Most capped players ====
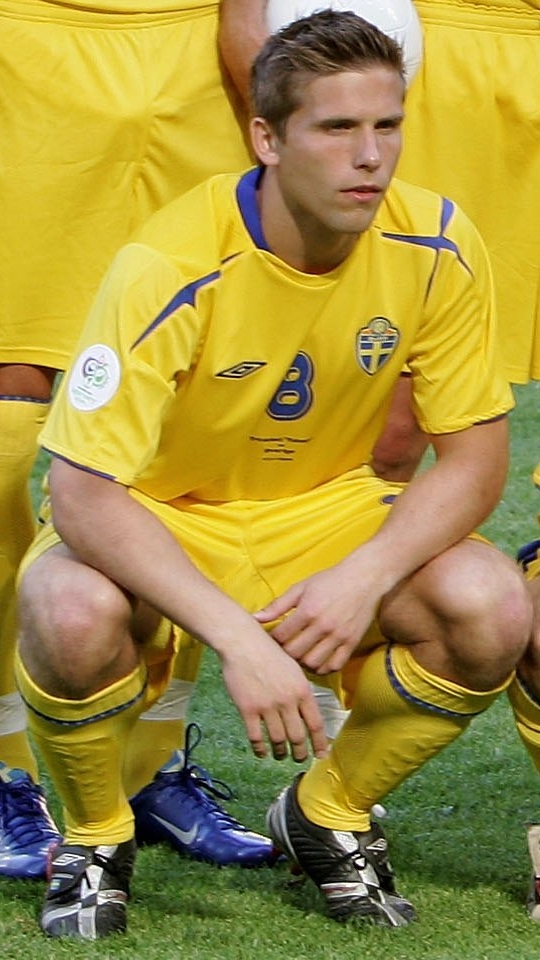
Anders Svensson is Sweden's most capped player of all time, with 148 appearances for the national team.

Rank	Player	Caps	Goals	Career
1	Anders Svensson	148	21	1999–2013
2	Thomas Ravelli	143	0	1981–1997
3	Sebastian Larsson	133	10	2008–2021
3	Andreas Isaksson	133	0	2002–2016
5	Kim Källström	131	16	2001–2016
6	Zlatan Ibrahimović	122	62	2001–2023
7	Olof Mellberg	117	8	2000–2012
8	Roland Nilsson	116	1	1986–2000
9	Björn Nordqvist	115	0	1963–1978
10	Niclas Alexandersson	109	7	1993–2008

==== Top goalscorers ====
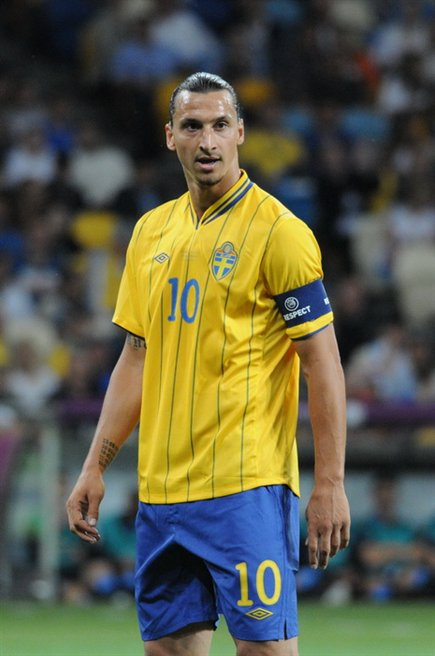
Zlatan Ibrahimović is Sweden's all-time top goalscorer, with 62 goals for the national team.

Rank	Player	Goals	Caps	Average	Career
1	Zlatan Ibrahimović (list)	62	122	0.51	2001–2023
2	Sven Rydell	49	43	1.14	1923–1932
3	Gunnar Nordahl	43	33	1.3	1942–1948
4	Henrik Larsson	37	106	0.35	1993–2009
5	Gunnar Gren	32	57	0.56	1940–1958
6	Kennet Andersson	31	83	0.37	1990–2000
7	Marcus Allbäck	30	74	0.41	1999–2008
8	Martin Dahlin	29	60	0.48	1991–1997
9	**Viktor Gyökeres**	27	42	0.64	2019–present
9	Tomas Brolin	27	47	0.57	1990–1995
9	Agne Simonsson	27	51	0.53	1957–1967

==== Age-related records ====
Age-related records of the Sweden men's national football team.

Oldest player
41 years, 5 months and 21 days – Zlatan Ibrahimović (0–3 against Belgium on 24 March 2023)
Youngest debutante
17 years, 2 months and 11 days – Gunnar Pleijel (5–2 against Finland on 22 October 1911)
Oldest debutante
34 years, 9 months and 1 day – Stendy Appeltoft (3–0 against Finland on 28 August 1955)
Longest national career
22 years, 1 month and 24 days – Zlatan Ibrahimović (from 31 January 2001 until 24 March 2023)
Oldest goalscorer
37 years, 11 months and 26 days – Gunnar Gren (two goals in a 4–4 draw against Denmark on 26 October 1958)
Youngest goalscorer
17 years, 3 months and 22 days – Alexander Isak (one goal in a 6–0 win against Slovakia on 12 January 2017)

== Competition records ==
Champions Runners-up Third place Fourth place Tournament held on home soil

=== FIFA World Cup ===
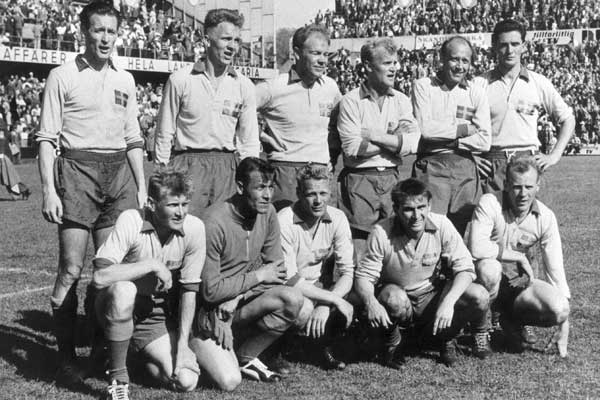
Sweden in the 1958 FIFA World Cup final.

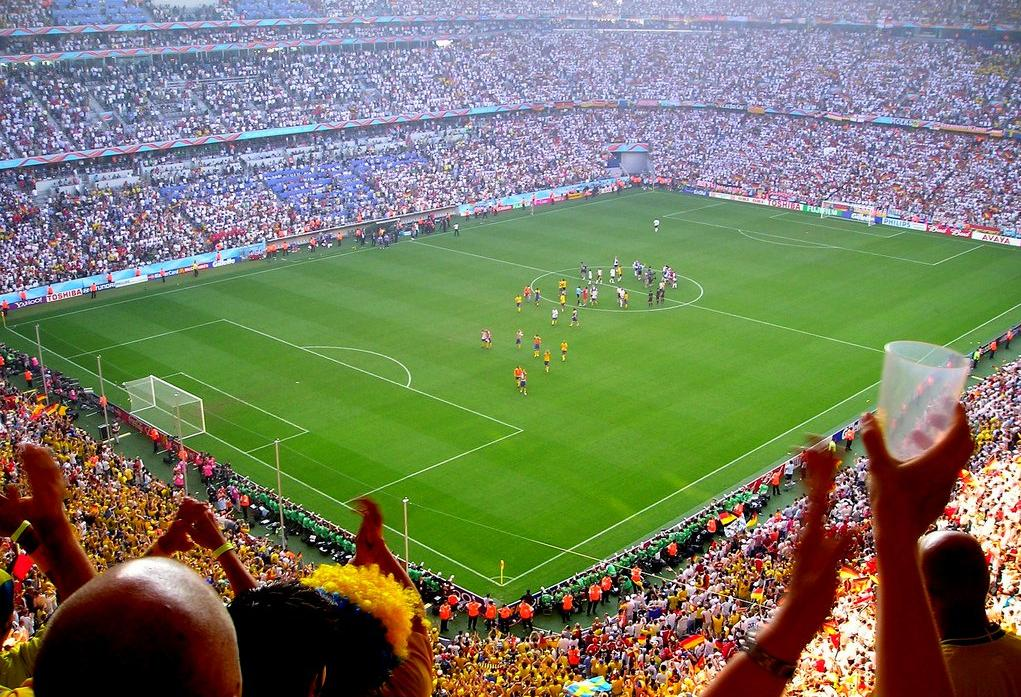
Sweden playing against Germany in the 2006 FIFA World Cup at Munich's Allianz Arena.

FIFA World Cup record									Qualification record					
Year	Round	Position	Pld	W	D	L	GF	GA	Pld	W	D	L	GF	GA
(Uruguay) 1930	Did not enter								No qualification					
(Italy) 1934	Quarter-finals	8th	2	1	0	1	4	4	2	2	0	0	8	2
(France) 1938	Fourth place	4th	3	1	0	2	11	9	3	2	0	1	11	7
(Brazil) 1950	Third place	3rd	5	2	1	2	11	15	2	2	0	0	6	2
(Switzerland) 1954	Did not qualify								4	1	1	2	9	8
(Sweden) 1958	Runners-up	2nd	6	4	1	1	12	7	Qualified as hosts					
(Chile) 1962	Did not qualify								5	3	0	2	11	5
(England) 1966	Did not qualify								4	2	1	1	10	3
(Mexico) 1970	Group stage	9th	3	1	1	1	2	2	4	3	0	1	12	5
(West Germany) 1974	Second round	5th	6	2	2	2	7	6	7	4	2	1	17	9
(Argentina) 1978	Group stage	13th	3	0	1	2	1	3	4	3	0	1	7	4
(Spain) 1982	Did not qualify								8	3	2	3	7	8
(Mexico) 1986	Did not qualify								8	4	1	3	14	9
(Italy) 1990	Group stage	21st	3	0	0	3	3	6	6	4	2	0	9	3
(United States) 1994	Third place	3rd	7	3	3	1	15	8	10	6	3	1	19	8
(France) 1998	Did not qualify								10	7	0	3	16	9
(South Korea) (Japan) 2002	Round of 16	13th	4	1	2	1	5	5	10	8	2	0	20	3
(Germany) 2006	Round of 16	14th	4	1	2	1	3	4	10	8	0	2	30	4
(South Africa) 2010	Did not qualify								10	5	3	2	13	5
(Brazil) 2014	Did not qualify								12	6	2	4	21	18
(Russia) 2018	Quarter-finals	7th	5	3	0	2	6	4	12	7	2	3	27	9
(Qatar) 2022	Did not qualify								10	6	0	4	13	8
(Canada) (Mexico) (United States) 2026	Round of 32	27th	4	1	1	2	7	10	8	2	2	4	10	15
Total	Best: Runners-up	13/23	55	20	14	21	87	83	149	88	23	38	290	144

=== UEFA European Championship ===
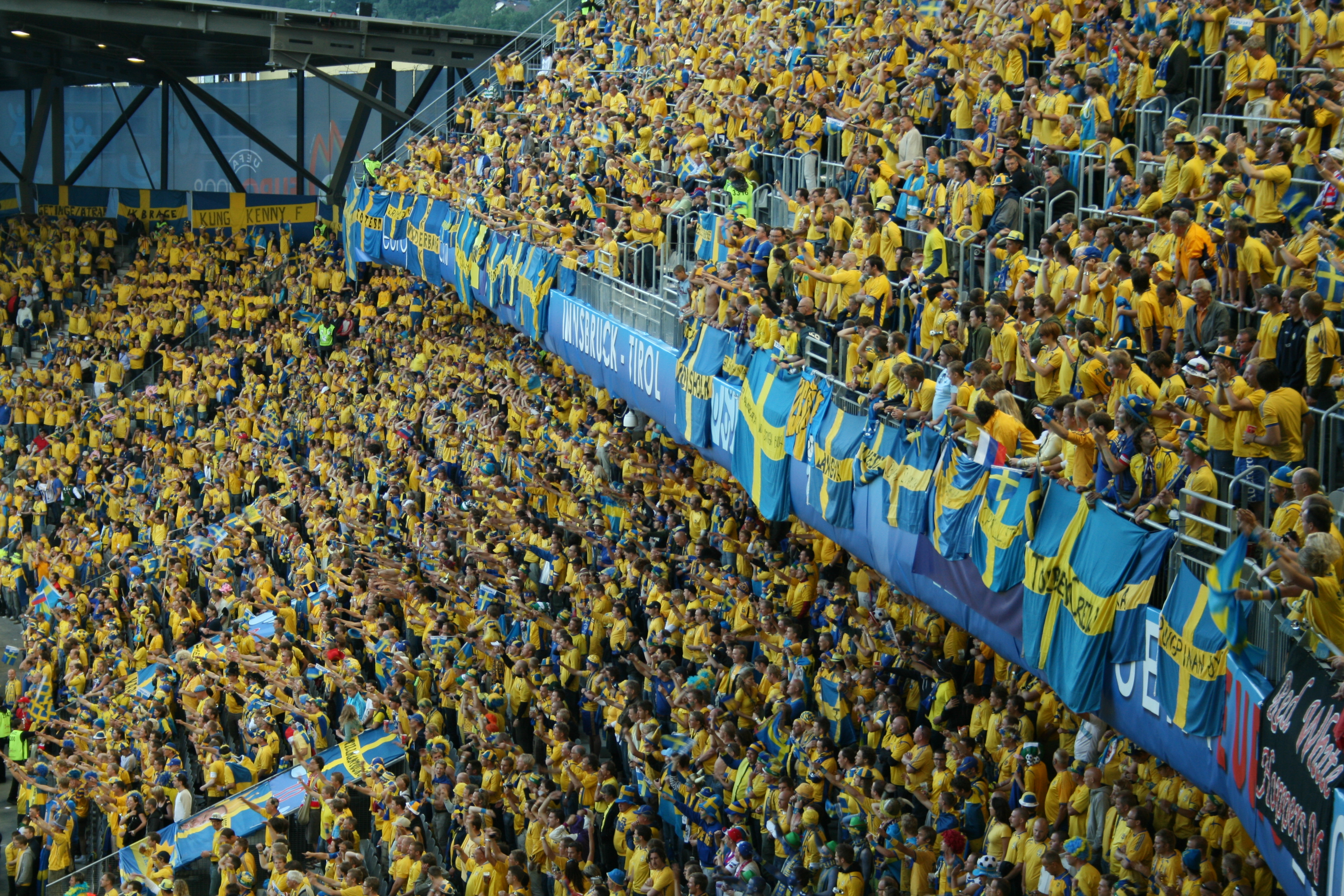
Swedish supporters during UEFA Euro 2008.

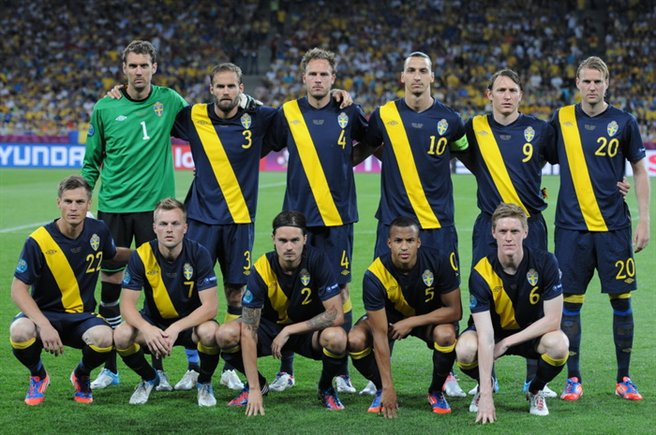
Sweden at the UEFA Euro 2012.

UEFA European Championship record									Qualification record					
Year	Round	Position	Pld	W	D	L	GF	GA	Pld	W	D	L	GF	GA
(France) 1960	Did not enter								Did not enter					
(Spain) 1964	Did not qualify								6	2	3	1	8	7
(Italy) 1968	Did not qualify								6	2	1	3	9	12
(Belgium) 1972	Did not qualify								6	2	2	2	3	5
(Socialist Federal Republic of Yugoslavia) 1976	Did not qualify								6	3	0	3	8	9
(Italy) 1980	Did not qualify								6	1	2	3	9	13
(France) 1984	Did not qualify								8	5	1	2	14	5
(West Germany) 1988	Did not qualify								8	4	2	2	12	5
(Sweden) 1992	Semi-finals	3rd	4	2	1	1	6	5	Qualified as hosts					
(England) 1996	Did not qualify								8	2	3	3	9	10
(Belgium) (Netherlands) 2000	Group stage	14th	3	0	1	2	2	4	8	7	1	0	10	1
(Portugal) 2004	Quarter-finals	7th	4	1	3	0	8	3	8	5	2	1	19	3
(Austria) (Switzerland) 2008	Group stage	10th	3	1	0	2	3	4	12	8	2	2	23	9
(Poland) (Ukraine) 2012	Group stage	11th	3	1	0	2	5	5	10	8	0	2	31	11
(France) 2016	Group stage	20th	3	0	1	2	1	3	12	6	4	2	19	12
(Europe) 2020	Round of 16	10th	4	2	1	1	5	4	10	6	3	1	23	9
(Germany) 2024	Did not qualify								8	3	1	4	14	12
Total	Best: Semi-finals	7/17	24	7	7	10	30	28	122	64	27	31	211	123

=== UEFA Nations League ===
UEFA Nations League record
Season	Division	Group	Pld	W	D	L	GF	GA	P/R	RK
2018–19	B	2	4	2	1	1	5	3	▲	16th
2020–21	A	3	6	1	0	5	5	13	▼	14th
2022–23	B	4	6	1	1	4	7	11	▼	30th
2024–25	C	1	6	5	1	0	19	4	▲	34th
2026–27	B	4	4	3	1	0	7	3	TBD	
Total			26	12	4	10	43	34	14th	

=== Olympic Games ===
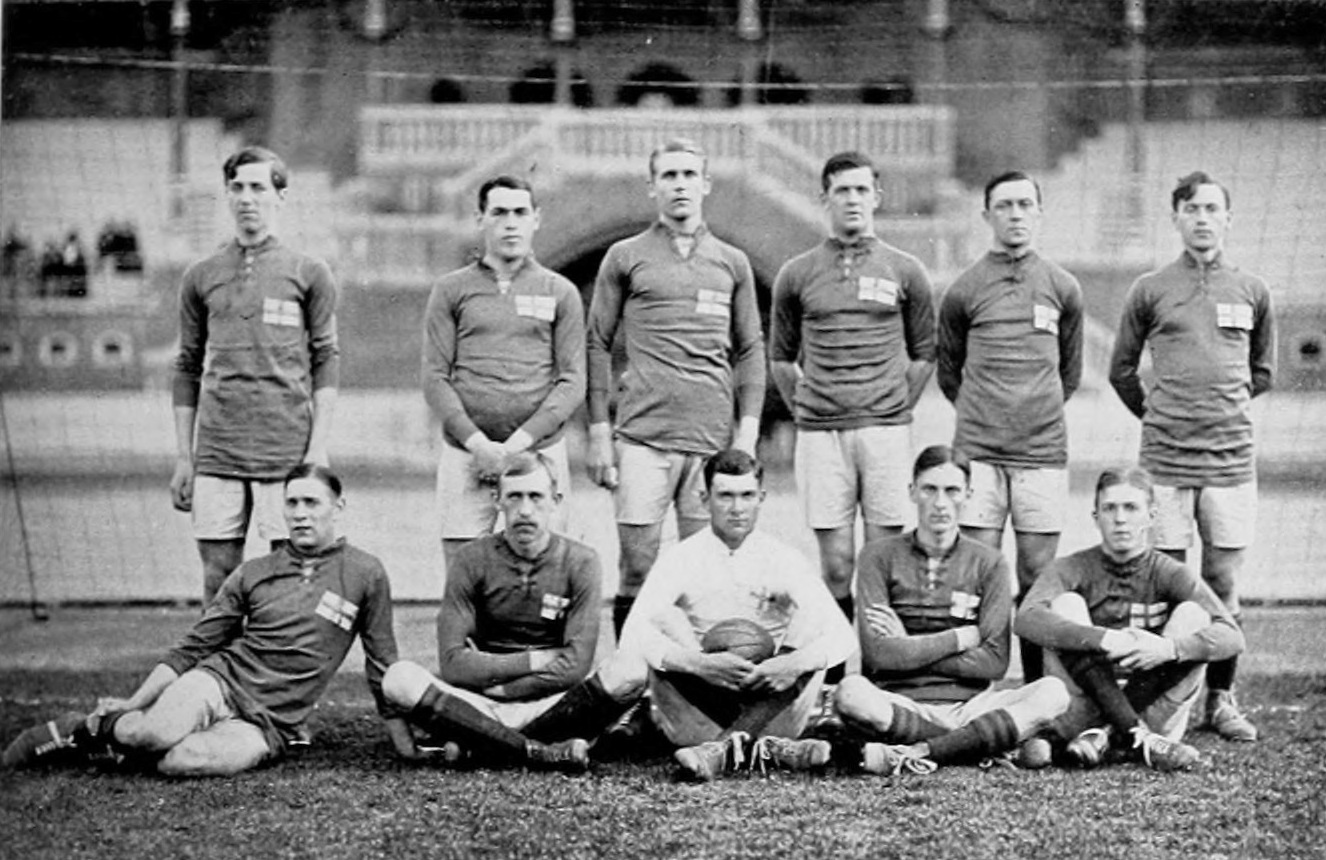
Sweden at the 1912 Summer Olympics.

Football at the Summer Olympics was first played officially in 1908. The Olympiads between 1896 and 1980 were only open for amateur players. The 1984 and 1988 tournaments were open to players with no appearances in the FIFA World Cup. After the 1988 Olympics, the football event was changed into a tournament for U23 teams with a maximum of three older players. See Sweden Olympic football team for competition record from 1984 until present day.

Olympic Games record									Qualification record					
Year	Round	Position	Pld	W	D	L	GF	GA	Pld	W	D	L	GF	GA
(United Kingdom) 1908	Fourth place	4th	2	0	0	2	1	14	No qualification					
(Sweden) 1912	Round of 16	9th	2	0	0	2	3	5	No qualification					
(Belgium) 1920	Quarter-finals	6th	3	1	0	2	14	7	No qualification					
(France) 1924	Third place	3rd	5	3	1	1	18	5	No qualification					
(Netherlands) 1928	Did not enter								No qualification					
(Germany) 1936	Round of 16	9th	1	0	0	1	2	3	No qualification					
(United Kingdom) 1948	Champions	1st	4	4	0	0	22	3	No qualification					
(Finland) 1952	Third place	3rd	4	3	0	1	9	8	No qualification					
(Australia) 1956	Did not enter								Did not enter					
(Italy) 1960	Did not enter								Did not enter					
(Japan) 1964	Did not qualify								2	0	1	1	2	6
(Mexico) 1968	Did not enter								Did not enter					
(West Germany) 1972	Did not enter								Did not enter					
(Canada) 1976	Did not enter								Did not enter					
(Soviet Union) 1980	Did not enter								Did not enter					
Total	1 title	7/15	21	11	1	9	69	45	2	0	1	1	2	6

=== Nordic Football Championship ===
Nordic Football Championship record
Year	Round	Position	Pld	W	D	L	GF	GA
1924–28	Runners-up	2nd	10	6	1	3	31	19
1929–32	Runners-up	2nd	12	6	1	5	35	31
1933–36	Champions	1st	12	7	2	3	31	22
1937–47	Champions	1st	12	9	0	3	41	16
1948–51	Champions	1st	12	7	2	3	36	22
1952–55	Champions	1st	12	8	4	0	44	14
1956–59	Champions	1st	12	9	2	1	45	17
1960–63	Champions	1st	12	7	3	2	24	10
1964–67	Champions	1st	12	5	4	3	22	14
1968–71	Champions	1st	12	10	2	0	32	10
1972–77	Champions	1st	12	8	2	2	24	9
1978–80	Runners-up	2nd	6	3	0	3	7	6
1981–85	Runners-up	2nd	6	3	1	2	7	4
2000–01	Fifth place	5th	5	1	2	2	3	4
Total	9 titles	14/14	147	89	26	32	382	198

=== Minor tournaments ===
Minor tournaments record
Tournament	Round	Position	Pld	W	D	L	GF	GA
(Denmark) 1939 DBU 50 years	Semi-finals	3rd	1	0	0	1	0	1
(Finland) (Sweden) 1947 FBF 40 years	Winners	1st	2	2	0	0	11	2
(Norway) 1952 NFF 50 years	Runners-up	2nd	2	1	0	1	3	3
(Sweden) 1954 SvFF 50 years	Winners	1st	2	2	0	0	9	0
(Finland) 1957 FBF 50 years	Winners	1st	2	1	1	0	5	1
(Finland) 1981 Lahti Cup	Runners-up	2nd	2	1	0	1	5	4
(Spain) 1988 Maspalomas	Winners	1st	2	2	0	0	5	1
(West Germany) 1988 West Berlin	Winners	1st	2	1	1	0	3	1
(Denmark) 1989 DBU 100 years	Runners-up	2nd	2	1	0	1	2	7
(Sweden) 1991 Scania 100	Third place	3rd	2	1	0	1	6	3
(United States) 1994 Joe Robbie Cup	Winners	1st	2	1	1	0	3	1
(Denmark) (Norway) (Sweden) 1994 Nordic Cup	Winners	1st	2	1	0	1	2	1
(England) 1995 Umbro Cup	Third place	3rd	3	0	2	1	5	6
(Hong Kong) 1996 Carlsberg Cup	Winners	1st	2	1	1	0	2	1
(Thailand) 1997 King's Cup	Winners	1st	4	3	1	0	6	1
(Thailand) 2001 King's Cup	Winners	1st	4	2	2	0	9	3
(Thailand) 2003 King's Cup	Winners	1st	4	3	1	0	12	4
(Hong Kong) 2004 Carlsberg Cup	Third place	3rd	2	1	0	1	3	3
2011 Cyprus Cup	Runners-up	2nd	2	1	1	0	3	1
(Thailand) 2013 King's Cup	Winners	1st	2	1	1	0	4	1
Total	12 titles		46	26	12	8	98	45

== Head-to-head records ==
The following table shows Sweden's all-time international record. The abandoned match against Denmark on 2 June 2007 here counts as a draw.

Statistics updated as of 5 October 2026.

Against	Pld	W	D	L	GF	GA	GD	Win %
Albania	6	4	1	1	11	5	+6	66.67%
Algeria	6	5	1	0	15	4	+11	83.33%
Argentina	3	1	1	1	6	6	0	33.33%
Armenia	1	1	0	0	3	1	+2	100%
Australia	5	1	2	2	2	2	0	20%
Austria	39	13	6	20	56	62	−6	33.33%
Azerbaijan	6	5	0	1	18	4	+14	83.33%
Bahrain	1	1	0	0	2	0	+2	100%
Barbados	1	1	0	0	4	0	+4	100%
Belarus	5	5	0	0	16	2	+14	100%
Belgium	17	5	3	9	31	27	+4	29.41%
Bosnia and Herzegovina	2	1	1	0	5	3	+2	50%
Botswana	1	1	0	0	2	1	+1	100%
Brazil	15	2	3	10	17	35	−18	13.33%
Bulgaria	16	11	2	3	31	11	+20	68.75%
Cameroon	1	0	1	0	2	2	0	0%
Chile	2	0	1	1	2	3	−1	0%
China	3	2	1	0	6	2	+4	66.67%
Colombia	2	0	2	0	2	2	0	0%
Costa Rica	2	1	0	1	2	2	0	50%
Croatia	6	2	0	4	7	8	−1	33.33%
Cuba	1	1	0	0	8	0	+8	100%
Cyprus	6	5	1	0	19	3	+16	83.33%
Czech Republic	4	2	2	0	7	5	+2	50%
Czechoslovakia	16	3	4	9	21	36	−15	18.75%
Denmark	110	47	21	42	189	179	+10	42.73%
East Germany	6	2	1	3	8	9	−1	33.33%
Ecuador	2	0	1	1	2	3	−1	0%
Egypt	4	2	0	2	10	3	+7	50%
England	24	7	9	8	31	37	−6	29.17%
England Amateurs	3	0	0	3	2	18	−16	0%
Estonia	22	19	3	0	68	17	+51	86.36%
Faroe Islands	5	4	1	0	11	1	+10	80%
Finland	91	69	11	11	299	96	+203	75.82%
France	24	6	5	13	23	37	−14	25%
Georgia	2	1	0	1	1	2	−1	50%
Germany	38	13	9	16	63	72	−9	36%
Great Britain	1	0	0	1	1	12	−11	0%
Greece	9	3	3	3	20	10	+10	33.33%
Hungary	47	18	11	18	81	91	−10	38.3%
Iceland	17	12	3	2	39	18	+21	70.59%
Iran	1	1	0	0	3	1	+2	100%
Israel	12	7	4	1	26	9	+17	58.33%
Italy	25	7	7	11	25	28	−3	28%
Ivory Coast	3	1	0	2	3	3	0	33.33%
Jamaica	2	1	1	0	2	1	+1	50%
Japan	6	1	4	1	8	8	0	16.67%
Jordan	1	0	1	0	0	0	0	0%
Kazakhstan	2	2	0	0	3	0	+3	100%
Kosovo	5	3	0	2	7	3	+4	60%
Latvia	17	11	4	2	54	12	+42	64.71%
Liechtenstein	4	4	0	0	10	1	+9	100%
Lithuania	5	5	0	0	22	3	+19	100%
Luxembourg	6	5	1	0	16	1	+15	83.33%
Malaysia	1	1	0	0	3	1	+2	100%
Malta	13	13	0	0	49	2	+47	100%
Mexico	11	6	3	2	13	6	+7	54.55%
Moldova	9	9	0	0	24	4	+20	100%
Montenegro	3	2	1	0	6	3	+3	66.67%
New Zealand	1	1	0	0	4	1	+3	100%
Netherlands	26	8	6	12	49	52	–3	30.77%
Nigeria	2	2	0	0	5	2	+3	100%
North Korea	3	1	2	0	6	2	+4	33.33%
North Macedonia	3	3	0	0	4	1	+3	100%
Northern Ireland	7	3	1	3	7	10	−3	42.86%
Norway	112	60	25	27	285	158	+127	53.57%
Oman	1	1	0	0	1	0	+1	100%
Paraguay	3	1	1	1	4	4	0	33.33%
Peru	1	0	1	0	0	0	0	0%
Poland	30	17	4	9	65	44	+21	56.67%
Portugal	21	7	6	8	31	30	+1	33.33%
Qatar	3	2	1	0	8	2	+6	66.67%
Republic of Ireland	11	5	3	3	17	14	+3	45.45%
Romania	14	8	3	3	27	13	+14	57.14%
Russia	29	10	10	9	37	47	-10	34.48%
San Marino	4	4	0	0	22	0	+22	100%
Saudi Arabia	3	2	1	0	6	3	+3	66.67%
Scotland	12	6	1	5	19	14	+5	50%
Senegal	1	0	0	1	1	2	−1	0%
Serbia	5	1	0	4	3	11	−8	20%
Singapore	1	1	0	0	5	0	+5	100%
Slovakia	9	5	4	0	16	5	+11	55.56%
Slovenia	6	2	4	0	7	4	+3	33.33%
South Africa	3	1	1	1	4	2	+2	33.33%
South Korea	5	3	2	0	18	3	+15	60%
Spain	18	4	6	8	18	27	−9	23.53%
Switzerland	31	11	7	13	48	48	0	35.48%
Syria	1	0	1	0	1	1	0	0%
Thailand	5	4	1	0	13	4	+9	80%
Trinidad and Tobago	2	1	1	0	5	0	+5	50%
Tunisia	5	3	1	1	8	3	+5	60%
Turkey	12	3	4	5	14	15	−1	25%
Ukraine	6	2	1	3	7	7	0	33.33%
United Arab Emirates	2	1	0	1	3	2	+1	50%
United States	8	4	0	4	13	10	+3	50%
Uruguay	3	2	0	1	6	3	+3	66.67%
Uzbekistan	1	1	0	0	2	1	+1	100%
Venezuela	1	0	0	1	0	2	−2	0%
Wales	7	6	1	0	16	3	+13	85.71%
Yugoslavia	11	4	2	5	17	19	−2	36.36%
Total	1128	556	237	335	2238	1486	+753	49.29%

=== Matches not counted as international matches by FIFA ===
This is a list of matches that the Swedish FA counts as official international matches, but not FIFA. All these matches are included in the table above.

- Sweden 1–6 England Amateurs (Gothenburg, Sweden; 8 September 1908)
- England Amateurs 7–0 Sweden (Kingston upon Hull, England; 6 November 1909)
- Sweden 1–5 England Amateurs (Solna, Sweden; 10 June 1914)
- Sweden 4–1 Norway (Tampere, Finland; 21 July 1952)
- Sweden 3–1 Austria (Helsinki, Finland; 23 July 1952)
- Hungary 6–0 Sweden (Helsinki, Finland; 28 July 1952)
- Sweden 2–0 Germany (Helsinki, Finland; 1 August 1952)
- Hungary 4–0 Sweden (Budapest, Hungary; 4 May 1963)
- Sweden 2–2 Hungary (Gothenburg, Sweden; 27 October 1963)
- Sweden 4–2 Norway (Lahti, Finland; 28 February 1981)
- Sweden 4–0 United States (Jönköping, Sweden; 23 February 1984)
- Romania 0–2 Sweden (Bangkok, Thailand; 9 February 1997)
- Sweden 1–0 Denmark (La Manga, Spain; 31 January 2000)
- South Africa 1–1 Sweden (Nelspruit, South Africa; 22 January 2011)
- Cyprus 0–2 Sweden (Nicosia, Cyprus; 8 February 2011)
- Qatar 0–5 Sweden (Doha, Qatar; 23 January 2012)
- Sweden 1–1 (4–1 p) North Korea (Chiang Mai, Thailand; 23 January 2013)
- Sweden 3–0 Finland (Chiang Mai, Thailand; 26 January 2013)
- Sweden 0–1 Finland (Abu Dhabi, United Arab Emirates; 19 January 2015)
- Sweden 1–1 Estonia (Abu Dhabi, United Arab Emirates; 6 January 2016)
- Finland 0–3 Sweden (Abu Dhabi, United Arab Emirates; 10 January 2016)
- Sweden 1–2 Ivory Coast (Abu Dhabi, United Arab Emirates; 8 January 2017)
- Sweden 6–0 Slovakia (Abu Dhabi, United Arab Emirates; 12 January 2017)
- Sweden 1–1 Estonia (Abu Dhabi, United Arab Emirates; 7 January 2018)
- Sweden 1–0 Denmark (Abu Dhabi, United Arab Emirates; 11 January 2018)-->
