= Jarle Flo =

Norwegian footballer (born 1970)

Personal information
- Date of birth: 23 April 1970 (age 56)
- Place of birth: Stryn, Norway
- Height: 1.94 m (6 ft 4 in)
- Position: Central defender

Youth career
- –1986: Stryn

Senior career*
Years	Team	Apps	(Gls)
1987–1992	Stryn		
1993–1998	Sogndal		
- * Club domestic league appearances and goals

Jarle Flo (born 23 April 1970) is a retired Norwegian footballer who played as a defender for Stryn and Sogndal. Three of his seasons in Sogndal came in Eliteserien; 1994, 1997 and 1998. He was a member of the Flo family, with several family members playing in the English Premier League.

== Personal life ==
Jarle Flo is the brother of fellow footballers Kjell Rune, Jostein and Tore André Flo, and first cousin of Håvard Flo. With all hailing from Flo in Stryn Municipality, they all started their career in Stryn TIL before they progressed to the larger neighboring club Sogndal IL. In 1992, Jarle played for Stryn together with Tore André and the lesser known brothers Kjell Rune and Bjarte. In the 1993 season opener, Sogndal started with Jarle, Tore André, Jostein and Håvard. The four oldest Flo brothers were Leeds United fans growing up.

Jarle Flo and his then-cohabitant had their first child in the mid-1990s. They married in April 1998. In 2015, his son Mathias Flo was allowed to train with Sogndal's senior team. The same opportunity was given to Jarle Flo's first cousin once removed, Fredrik Flo (son of Håvard). Mathias Flo played as a striker for Sogndal 2, Raufoss and Fjøra.

== Career ==
As a teenager, Jarle Flo practised football, swimming and athletics. Owing to differences in growth, he was a better high jumper than double Olympian Steinar Hoen at the age of 14.

Jarle Flo was drafted into Stryn's senior football team in 1987, contesting the third tier under new manager Harald Aabrekk. He joined from Stryn's junior team alongside Håvard Flo. In December 1992 his transfer to Sogndal was announced, making the move at the same time as his younger brother Tore André. Jarle would also attend Sogn og Fjordane University College. Sogndal were promoted to the 1994 Eliteserien after Jarle Flo scored the goal that secured one point against Hødd in October 1993.

Flo's first Eliteserien goals came in July 1994, when he scored both goals in a home victory over Tromsø. In late 1995, the newspaper VG reported that Tromsø IL had transfer talks with Jarle Flo. Tore André Flo was a striker for Tromsø at the time, and according to VG, Tore André vowed to continue his career there if Tromsø signed Jarle. In August 1997, Watford's assistant manager Kenny Jackett scouted and had a sitdown with Jarle Flo and Flo's agent Gunnar Martin Kjenner. However, Watford did not wish to spend money on the defender who had one year left of his contract.

During that time, Norway played Liverpool in a yearly exhibition match in Oslo. In 1997, Jarle Flo was selected for the Norwegian team. Notably, Flo tackled Liverpool striker Robbie Fowler, who sustained a knee injury which caused him to miss the opening phase of the Premier League. Also in 1997, Jarle Flo notably played against both Tore André (in Brann) and Jostein (in Strømsgodset). Jarle played in central defence against his brothers who were strikers, managing to hold Tore André goalless shortly before the latter moved to Chelsea, whereas Jostein scored several goals.

In the 1998 Eliteserien, a hapless Sogndal were relegated. According to Bergens Tidende, the club was badly managed, both by the coaches and the board. As the manager stripped Asle Hillestad of the captaincy, according to Bergens Tidende several team members regarded Jarle Flo as being bypassed when the young Eirik Bakke was made captain. Throughout 1998, Jarle Flo was often benched or fielded as a midfielder or winger. Whereas other players were preferred in central defence, this did not work out for Sogndal, reaching the lowest point when Sogndal was trounced 0–9 at home by Stabæk. While several players left Sogndal for other clubs, some voicing their criticism, Jarle Flo lost his motivation and retired as a player. Flo would not criticize Sogndal openly; "There is no point in digging oneself further down in the football dirt".

Jarle Flo later served as a board member of Sogndal Fotball.

=== Style of play ===
Standing at 1.94 metres (6 ft 4 in) tall, Jarle Flo was known for aerial strength. VG also described his playing style as "honest" and that he was willing to do legwork.
