= 2004 Lunar New Year Cup =

Tournament details
- Host country: Hong Kong
- Dates: 6 – 9 February
- Teams: 4
- Venue: 1 (in 1 host city)

Final positions
- Champions: Norway (2nd title)

Tournament statistics
- Matches played: 4
- Goals scored: 11 (2.75 per match)
- Top scorer(s): (Norway) Frode Johnsen (Norway) Havard Flo (Sweden) Lasse Nilsson (2 goals)

The 2004 Lunar New Year Cup (a.k.a. Carlsberg Cup) was a football tournament held in Hong Kong over the first and fourth day of the Chinese New Year holiday (6 February 2004 and 9 February 2004).

== Participating teams ==
- Hong Kong League XI (host)
- Honduras
- Norway
- Sweden

== Squads ==
=== Hong Kong League XI ===
- Coach: (Hong Kong) Lai Sun Cheung

No.	Pos.	Player	Date of birth (age)	Caps	Club
1	GK	(Macau) Domingos Chan	11 September 1970 (aged 33)		(Hong Kong) Sun Hei
2	DF	(Nigeria) Barnes Colly Ezeh	10 December 1979 (aged 24)		(Hong Kong) Happy Valley
4	DF	(Hong Kong) Ng Wai Chiu	22 October 1981 (aged 22)		(China) Guangzhou Pharmaceutical
5	DF	(Brazil) Cristiano Cordeiro	14 August 1973 (aged 30)		(Hong Kong) Sun Hei
6	MF	(Hong Kong) Lau Chi Keung	7 January 1977 (aged 27)		(Hong Kong) Sun Hei
7	MF	(Hong Kong) Law Chun Bong	25 January 1981 (aged 22)		(Hong Kong) Sun Hei
8	MF	(Hong Kong) Cheung Sai Ho	27 August 1975 (aged 28)		(Hong Kong) Happy Valley
9	FW	(Brazil) Marcio Gabriel Anacleto	10 November 1975 (aged 28)		(Hong Kong)
10	MF	(Japan) Dan Ito	3 November 1975 (aged 28)		(Hong Kong) Kitchee
11	MF	(Hong Kong) Lee Kin Wo	20 October 1967 (aged 36)		(Hong Kong) Sun Hei
14	MF	(Hong Kong) Sham Kwok Keung	10 September 1985 (aged 18)		(Hong Kong) Happy Valley
15	DF	(Hong Kong) Chan Wai Ho	24 April 1982 (aged 21)		(Hong Kong) Rangers
16	DF	(Hong Kong) Luk Koon Pong	1 August 1978 (aged 25)		(Hong Kong) South China
18	DF	(Hong Kong) Lee Wai Man	18 August 1973 (aged 30)		(Hong Kong) Happy Valley
19	GK	(Hong Kong) Fan Chun Yip	2 May 1976 (aged 27)		(Hong Kong) Happy Valley
20	DF	(Hong Kong) Poon Yiu Cheuk	19 September 1977 (aged 26)		(Hong Kong) Happy Valley
21	FW	(Indonesia) Rochi Putiray	26 June 1970 (aged 33)		(Hong Kong) Kitchee
22	FW	(Hong Kong) Kwok Yue Hung	28 February 1975 (aged 28)		(Hong Kong) Happy Valley
23	MF	(Nigeria) Gerard Ambassa Guy	21 September 1978 (aged 25)		(Hong Kong) Happy Valley
24	MF	(Hong Kong) Poon Man Tik	24 February 1975 (aged 28)		(Hong Kong) Sun Hei
25	DF	(Hong Kong) Szeto Man Chun	5 June 1975 (aged 28)		(Hong Kong) South China
	DF	(Hong Kong) Man Pei Tak	16 February 1982 (aged 21)		(Hong Kong) Rangers
	MF	(Brazil) Jose Ricardo Rambo	17 August 1971 (aged 32)		(Hong Kong)
	FW	(Hong Kong) Wong Chun Yue	28 January 1978 (aged 25)		(Hong Kong) Sun Hei

=== Honduras ===
- Coach: (Serbia and Montenegro) Bora Milutinović

No.	Pos.	Player	Date of birth (age)	Caps	Club
1	GK	Hector Medina	27 January 1975 (aged 28)		(Honduras) Real España
2	DF	Elmer Marín	14 October 1979 (aged 24)		(Honduras) Olimpia
4	DF	Milton Palacios	2 December 1980 (aged 23)		(Honduras) Olimpia
6	DF	Ninrod Medina	26 August 1976 (aged 27)		(Mexico) Zacatepec
8	DF	José Pineda	19 March 1975 (aged 28)		(Honduras) Olimpia
10	FW	Wilmer Velásquez	28 April 1972 (aged 31)		(Honduras) Olimpia
11	FW	Milton Núñez	30 November 1972 (aged 31)		(Mexico) Necaxa
12	MF	Maynor Suazo	10 August 1979 (aged 24)		(Austria) Salzburg
13	FW	Pompilio Cacho	22 December 1976 (aged 27)		(Honduras) Motagua
15	MF	Elkin González	29 September 1980 (aged 23)		(Honduras) Real España
16		Marcelo Ferreira			(Honduras) Olimpia
17	DF	Javier Martínez	6 December 1971 (aged 32)		(Honduras) Marathón
18	FW	Saul Martínez	29 January 1976 (aged 27)		(China) Shanghai Shenhua
19	DF	Iván Guerrero	30 November 1977 (aged 26)		(Honduras) Motagua
21	FW	Williams Reyes	30 December 1976 (aged 27)		(El Salvador) FAS
24	DF	Júnior Izaguirre	12 August 1979 (aged 24)		(Honduras) Motagua
	GK	Víctor Coello	29 July 1974 (aged 29)		(Honduras) Marathón
	DF	Edgar Alvarez	8 January 1980 (aged 24)		(Uruguay) Peñarol
	DF	Victor Mena	2 August 1980 (aged 23)		(Honduras) Motagua
	DF	Mauricio Sabillón	11 November 1978 (aged 25)		(Honduras) Marathón
	MF	Amado Guevara	2 May 1976 (aged 27)		(United States) New York Metrostars
	MF	Danilo Turcios	8 May 1978 (aged 25)		(Mexico) Tecos

=== Norway ===
- Coach: Age Hareide

No.	Pos.	Player	Date of birth (age)	Caps	Club
1	GK	Terje Skjeldestad	18 January 1978 (aged 26)		(Norway) Sogndal
3	DF	Vidar Riseth	21 April 1972 (aged 31)		(Norway) Rosenborg
4	DF	Brede Hangeland	20 June 1981 (aged 22)		(Norway) Viking
5	DF	Ståle Stensaas	7 July 1971 (aged 32)		(Norway) Rosenborg
6	DF	Jon Inge Høiland	20 September 1977 (aged 26)		(Sweden) Malmö
7	MF	Jan-Derek Sørensen	28 December 1971 (aged 32)		(Norway) Lyn
8	MF	Magne Hoseth	13 October 1980 (aged 23)		(Norway) Molde
9	FW	Frode Johnsen	13 July 1974 (aged 29)		(Norway) Rosenborg
10	FW	Håvard Flo	4 April 1970 (aged 33)		(Norway) Sogndal
11	FW	Harald Brattbakk	1 February 1971 (aged 32)		(Norway) Rosenborg
16	FW	Rune Buer Johansen	4 September 1973 (aged 30)		(Norway) Ham-Kam
17	MF	Daniel Braaten	25 May 1982 (aged 21)		(Norway) Skeid
18	MF	Karl Oskar Fjørtoft	26 July 1975 (aged 28)		(Sweden) Hammarby
19	MF	Ardian Gashi	20 June 1981 (aged 22)		(Norway) Ørn-Horten
20	DF	Pa Modou Kah	30 July 1980 (aged 23)		(Sweden) AIK
21	MF	Jan Gunnar Solli	19 April 1981 (aged 22)		(Norway) Rosenborg
22	MF	Anders Stadheim	14 August 1980 (aged 23)		(Norway) Sogndal
	GK	Erik Holtan	20 April 1969 (aged 34)		(Norway) Odd
	DF	Tommy Berntsen	18 December 1973 (aged 30)		(Norway) Lyn
	DF	Bjørn Dahl	17 April 1978 (aged 25)		(Norway) Viking
	DF	Erlend Hanstveit	28 January 1981 (aged 22)		(Norway) Brann
	DF	Alexander Aas	14 September 1978 (aged 25)		(Norway) Odd Grenland

=== Sweden ===
- Coaches: Tommy Söderberg, Lars Lagerbäck

No.	Pos.	Player	Date of birth (age)	Caps	Club
1	GK	Andreas Isaksson	3 October 1981 (aged 22)		(Sweden) Djurgårdens IF
2	DF	Christoffer Andersson	22 October 1978 (aged 25)		(Sweden) Helsingborgs IF
3	DF	Mikael Antonsson	31 May 1981 (aged 22)		(Sweden) IFK Göteborg
4	DF	Christian Järdler	3 June 1982 (aged 21)		(Sweden) Helsingborgs IF
5	DF	Fredric Lundqvist			(Sweden) GIF Sundsvall
6	DF	Max von Schlebrügge	1 February 1977 (aged 26)		(Sweden) Hammarby IF
7	DF	Fredrik Stenman	2 June 1983 (aged 20)		(Sweden) Djurgårdens IF
8	DF	Alexander Östlund	2 November 1978 (aged 25)		(Sweden) Hammarby IF
9	FW	Pablo Piñones-Arce	27 August 1981 (aged 22)		(Sweden) Hammarby IF
10	MF	Johan Arneng	14 June 1979 (aged 24)		(Sweden) Djurgårdens IF
11	MF	Martin Ericsson	4 September 1980 (aged 23)		(Sweden) IFK Göteborg
12	GK	Magnus Kihlstedt	29 February 1972 (aged 31)		(Denmark) F.C. Copenhagen
13	MF	Andreas Johansson	5 July 1978 (aged 25)		(Sweden) Djurgårdens IF
14	MF	Andreas Johansson	10 March 1982 (aged 21)		(Sweden) Halmstads BK
16	FW	Lasse Nilsson	3 January 1982 (aged 22)		(Sweden) Hammarby IF
17	MF	Mikael Nilsson	24 June 1978 (aged 25)		(Sweden) Halmstads BK
18	MF	Mats Rubarth	25 January 1977 (aged 26)		(Sweden) AIK Fotboll
19	FW	Niklas Skoog	15 June 1974 (aged 29)		(Sweden) Malmö FF
20	MF	Babis Stefanidis	8 March 1981 (aged 22)		(Sweden) Djurgårdens IF
21	GK	John Alvbåge	10 August 1982 (aged 21)		(Sweden) Örebro SK

== Results ==
=== Semifinals ===
6 February 2004

Sweden	0–3	Norway
		Johnsen 44'; Flo 53', 63'

Hong Kong Stadium, Hong Kong
Attendance: 16,765
Referee: Fong Yau Fat (Hong Kong)
6 February 2004

Hong Kong League XI	0–1	Honduras
		Cacho 18'

Hong Kong Stadium, Hong Kong
Attendance: 16,765
Referee: Adunyachart Khantama (Thailand)

=== Third place match ===
9 February 2004

Hong Kong League XI	0–3	Sweden
		Stefanidis 15'; Nilsson 73', 90'

Hong Kong Stadium, Hong Kong
Attendance: 14,604
Referee: Adunyachart Khantama (Thailand)

=== Final ===
9 February 2004

Norway	3–1	Honduras
Brattbakk 26'; Johnsen 37'; Hoset 86'		Martínez 28'

Hong Kong Stadium, Hong Kong
Attendance: 14,604
Referee: Fong Yau Fat (Hong Kong)

== Bracket ==
Semi-finals
6 February 2004 – Hong Kong
Sweden	0
Norway	3
6 February 2004 – Hong Kong
Hong Kong League XI	0
Honduras	1

Final
9 February 2004 – Hong Kong
Norway	3
Honduras	1
Third place
9 February 2004 – Hong Kong
Hong Kong League XI	0
Sweden	3

2004 Carlsberg Cup champions

Norway
Second title

== Top scorers ==
2 goals

- (Norway) Frode Johnsen
- (Norway) Havard Flo
- (Sweden) Lasse Nilsson

1 goal

- (Norway) Magne Hoset
- (Norway) Harald Brattbakk
- (Honduras) Pompilio Cacho
- (Honduras) Saúl Martínez
- (Sweden) Babis Stefanidis

== See also ==
- Hong Kong Football Association
- Hong Kong First Division League
