= List of international goals scored by Zlatan Ibrahimović =

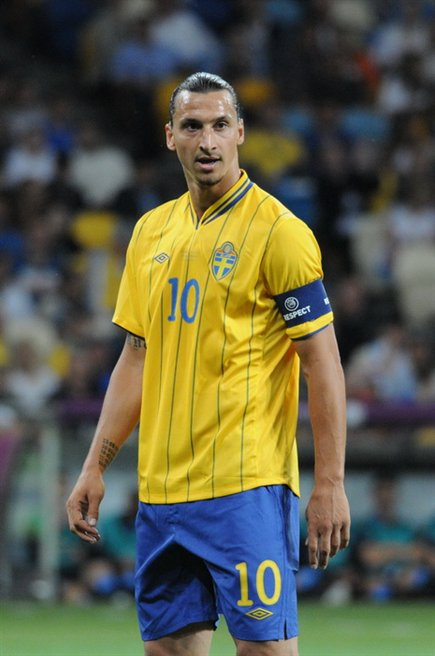
Zlatan Ibrahimović playing for Sweden during UEFA Euro 2012

Zlatan Ibrahimović is a Swedish former professional association footballer who represented Sweden at international level from 2001 to 2023. As well as Sweden, he was eligible to represent Bosnia and Herzegovina, or Croatia. He made his debut for Sweden in a 0–0 draw against the Faroe Islands on 31 January 2001, scoring his first international goal later that year against Azerbaijan. He briefly retired in October 2009 when Sweden failed to qualify for the 2010 FIFA World Cup, but returned to the international team as joint-captain the following August. During his international career, he scored 62 goals in 122 international appearances, making him Sweden's all-time top scorer, surpassing Sven Rydell's record with two goals against Estonia at the Friends Arena during a friendly in September 2014. On 21 June 2016, Ibrahimović announced his retirement from international football after UEFA Euro 2016, playing his last match for Sweden against Belgium the following day. However, he would reverse this decision more than four years later, being recalled to the national team in March 2021 at the age of 39.

Ibrahimović recorded his first international hat-trick on 4 September 2004, when he scored four goals against Malta, also the team against which he scored the most times, with six. He scored four international hat-tricks; in addition to the one against Malta; he scored three goals in a game against Finland during the UEFA Euro 2012 qualifying competition, four in a friendly against England in 2012, and three in a friendly against Norway in 2013. More than half of Ibrahimović's goals came at home, having scored twenty at the Friends Arena, eleven at the Råsunda Stadium, five at Ullevi, two at the Swedbank Stadion and one at Gamla Ullevi.

The majority of Ibrahimović's goals came in qualifying matches. He scored nineteen in European Championship qualifiers, including eleven during the 2016 qualifying round, where he finished as the second-highest scorer, two behind Poland's Robert Lewandowski. Ibrahimović also scored nineteen times in World Cup qualifiers. He never scored a goal in the World Cup finals but scored six in European Championship finals. The remainder of Ibrahimović's goals, eighteen, were scored in friendlies.

== International goals ==
Scores and results list Sweden's goal tally first.

Key
‡	Indicates goal was scored from a penalty kick

List of international goals scored by Zlatan Ibrahimović
No.	Cap	Date	Venue	Opponent	Score	Result	Competition	Ref.
1	4	7 October 2001	Råsunda Stadium, Solna, Sweden	Azerbaijan	3–0	3–0	2002 FIFA World Cup qualification	
2	13	21 August 2002	Lokomotiv Stadium, Moscow, Russia	Russia	1–1	1–1	Friendly	
3	15	12 October 2002	Råsunda Stadium, Solna, Sweden	Hungary	1–1	1–1	UEFA Euro 2004 qualification	
4	16	30 April 2003	Råsunda Stadium, Solna, Sweden	Croatia	1–1	1–2	Friendly	
5	17	6 September 2003	Ullevi, Gothenburg, Sweden	San Marino	3–0	5–0	UEFA Euro 2004 qualification	
6	17	6 September 2003	Ullevi, Gothenburg, Sweden	San Marino	5–0‡	5–0	UEFA Euro 2004 qualification	
7	20	31 March 2004	Ullevi, Gothenburg, Sweden	England	1–0	1–0	Friendly	
8	24	14 June 2004	Estádio José Alvalade, Lisbon, Portugal	Bulgaria	4–0‡	5–0	UEFA Euro 2004	
9	25	18 June 2004	Estádio do Dragão, Porto, Portugal	Italy	1–1	1–1	UEFA Euro 2004	
10	28	18 August 2004	Råsunda Stadium, Solna, Sweden	Netherlands	2–2	2–2	Friendly	
11	29	4 September 2004	National Stadium, Ta' Qali, Malta	Malta	1–0	7–0	2006 FIFA World Cup qualification	
12	29	4 September 2004	National Stadium, Ta' Qali, Malta	Malta	2–0	7–0	2006 FIFA World Cup qualification	
13	29	4 September 2004	National Stadium, Ta' Qali, Malta	Malta	3–0	7–0	2006 FIFA World Cup qualification	
14	29	4 September 2004	National Stadium, Ta' Qali, Malta	Malta	5–0	7–0	2006 FIFA World Cup qualification	
15	33	4 June 2005	Ullevi, Gothenburg, Sweden	Malta	4–0	6–0	2006 FIFA World Cup qualification	
16	34	3 September 2005	Råsunda Stadium, Solna, Sweden	Bulgaria	3–0	3–0	2006 FIFA World Cup qualification	
17	35	7 September 2005	Ferenc Puskás Stadium, Budapest, Hungary	Hungary	1–0	1–0	2006 FIFA World Cup qualification	
18	36	12 October 2005	Råsunda Stadium, Solna, Sweden	Iceland	1–1	3–1	2006 FIFA World Cup qualification	
19	51	10 June 2008	Wals-Siezenheim Stadium, Salzburg, Austria	Greece	1–0	2–0	UEFA Euro 2008	
20	52	14 June 2008	Tivoli-Neu, Innsbruck, Austria	Spain	1–1	1–2	UEFA Euro 2008	
21	58	10 June 2009	Ullevi, Gothenburg, Sweden	Malta	3–0	4–0	2010 FIFA World Cup qualification	
22	59	5 September 2009	Ferenc Puskás Stadium, Budapest, Hungary	Hungary	2–1	2–1	2010 FIFA World Cup qualification	
23	63	11 August 2010	Råsunda Stadium, Solna, Sweden	Scotland	1–0	3–0	Friendly	
24	65	7 September 2010	Swedbank Stadion, Malmö, Sweden	San Marino	1–0	6–0	UEFA Euro 2012 qualification	
25	65	7 September 2010	Swedbank Stadion, Malmö, Sweden	San Marino	5–0	6–0	UEFA Euro 2012 qualification	
26	69	7 June 2011	Råsunda Stadium, Solna, Sweden	Finland	2–0	5–0	UEFA Euro 2012 qualification	
27	69	7 June 2011	Råsunda Stadium, Solna, Sweden	Finland	3–0	5–0	UEFA Euro 2012 qualification	
28	69	7 June 2011	Råsunda Stadium, Solna, Sweden	Finland	4–0	5–0	UEFA Euro 2012 qualification	
29	75	29 February 2012	Stadion Maksimir, Zagreb, Croatia	Croatia	1–0‡	3–1	Friendly	
30	76	30 May 2012	Gamla Ullevi, Gothenburg, Sweden	Iceland	1–0	3–2	Friendly	
31	77	5 June 2012	Råsunda Stadium, Solna, Sweden	Serbia	2–1‡	2–1	Friendly	
32	78	11 June 2012	Olympic Stadium, Kyiv, Ukraine	Ukraine	1–0	1–2	UEFA Euro 2012	
33	80	19 June 2012	Olympic Stadium, Kyiv, Ukraine	France	1–0	2–0	UEFA Euro 2012	
34	83	12 October 2012	Tórsvøllur, Tórshavn, Faroe Islands	Faroe Islands	2–1	2–1	2014 FIFA World Cup qualification	
35	84	16 October 2012	Olympiastadion, Berlin, Germany	Germany	1–4	4–4	2014 FIFA World Cup qualification	
36	85	14 November 2012	Friends Arena, Solna, Sweden	England	1–0	4–2	Friendly	
37	85	14 November 2012	Friends Arena, Solna, Sweden	England	2–2	4–2	Friendly	
38	85	14 November 2012	Friends Arena, Solna, Sweden	England	3–2	4–2	Friendly	
39	85	14 November 2012	Friends Arena, Solna, Sweden	England	4–2	4–2	Friendly	
40	90	11 June 2013	Friends Arena, Solna, Sweden	Faroe Islands	1–0	2–0	2014 FIFA World Cup qualification	
41	90	11 June 2013	Friends Arena, Solna, Sweden	Faroe Islands	2–0‡	2–0	2014 FIFA World Cup qualification	
42	91	14 August 2013	Friends Arena, Solna, Sweden	Norway	1–0	4–2	Friendly	
43	91	14 August 2013	Friends Arena, Solna, Sweden	Norway	2–2	4–2	Friendly	
44	91	14 August 2013	Friends Arena, Solna, Sweden	Norway	3–2	4–2	Friendly	
45	93	10 September 2013	Astana Arena, Astana, Kazakhstan	Kazakhstan	1–0	1–0	2014 FIFA World Cup qualification	
46	94	11 October 2013	Friends Arena, Solna, Sweden	Austria	2–1	2–1	2014 FIFA World Cup qualification	
47	96	19 November 2013	Friends Arena, Solna, Sweden	Portugal	1–1	2–3	2014 FIFA World Cup qualification play-offs	
48	96	19 November 2013	Friends Arena, Solna, Sweden	Portugal	2–1	2–3	2014 FIFA World Cup qualification play-offs	
49	99	4 September 2014	Friends Arena, Solna, Sweden	Estonia	1–0	2–0	Friendly	
50	99	4 September 2014	Friends Arena, Solna, Sweden	Estonia	2–0	2–0	Friendly	
51	101	15 November 2014	Podgorica City Stadium, Podgorica, Montenegro	Montenegro	1–0	1–1	UEFA Euro 2016 qualification	
52	102	27 March 2015	Zimbru Stadium, Chișinău, Moldova	Moldova	1–0	2–0	UEFA Euro 2016 qualification	
53	102	27 March 2015	Zimbru Stadium, Chișinău, Moldova	Moldova	2–0‡	2–0	UEFA Euro 2016 qualification	
54	103	31 March 2015	Friends Arena, Solna, Sweden	Iran	1–0	3–1	Friendly	
55	105	14 June 2015	Friends Arena, Solna, Sweden	Montenegro	2–0	3–1	UEFA Euro 2016 qualification	
56	105	14 June 2015	Friends Arena, Solna, Sweden	Montenegro	3–0	3–1	UEFA Euro 2016 qualification	
57	107	8 September 2015	Friends Arena, Solna, Sweden	Austria	1–4	1–4	UEFA Euro 2016 qualification	
58	108	9 October 2015	Rheinpark Stadion, Vaduz, Liechtenstein	Liechtenstein	2–0	2–0	UEFA Euro 2016 qualification	
59	109	12 October 2015	Friends Arena, Solna, Sweden	Moldova	1–0	2–0	UEFA Euro 2016 qualification	
60	110	14 November 2015	Friends Arena, Solna, Sweden	Denmark	2–0‡	2–1	UEFA Euro 2016 qualification play-offs	
61	111	17 November 2015	Telia Parken, Copenhagen, Denmark	Denmark	1–0	2–2	UEFA Euro 2016 qualification play-offs	
62	111	17 November 2015	Telia Parken, Copenhagen, Denmark	Denmark	2–0	2–2	UEFA Euro 2016 qualification play-offs	

== Hat-tricks ==
No.	Opponent	Goals	Score	Venue	Competition	Date
1	Malta	4 – (1–0', 2–0', 3–0', 5–0')	7–0	National Stadium, Ta' Qali, Malta	2006 FIFA World Cup qualification	4 September 2004
2	England	4 – (1–0', 2–2', 3–2', 4–2')	4–2	Friends Arena, Solna, Sweden	Friendly	14 November 2012
3	Norway	3 – (1–0', 2–2', 3–2')	4–2	Friends Arena, Solna, Sweden	Friendly	14 August 2013

== Statistics ==
Goals by year
Year	Apps	Goals
2001	5	1
2002	10	2
2003	4	3
2004	12	8
2005	5	4
2006	6	0
2007	7	0
2008	7	2
2009	6	2
2010	4	3
2011	8	3
2012	11	11
2013	11	9
2014	5	3
2015	10	11
2016	5	0
2017	0	0
2018	0	0
2019	0	0
2020	0	0
2021	4	0
2022	1	0
2023	1	0
Total	122	62

Goals by competition
Competition	Goals
FIFA World Cup qualification	19
UEFA European Championship qualification	19
Friendlies	18
UEFA European Championship finals	6
Total	62

Goals by opponent
Opponent	Goals
Malta	6
England	5
San Marino	4
Denmark	3
Faroe Islands	3
Finland	3
Hungary	3
Moldova	3
Montenegro	3
Norway	3
Austria	2
Bulgaria	2
Croatia	2
Estonia	2
Iceland	2
Portugal	2
Azerbaijan	1
France	1
Germany	1
Greece	1
Iran	1
Italy	1
Kazakhstan	1
Liechtenstein	1
Netherlands	1
Russia	1
Scotland	1
Serbia	1
Spain	1
Ukraine	1
Total	62

== See also ==
- List of men's footballers with 50 or more international goals
- List of top international men's football goal scorers by country
- Sweden national football team records and statistics
