= Asbjørn Tenden =

Norwegian footballer (born 1975)

Personal information
- Full name: Asbjørn Tenden
- Date of birth: 9 April 1975 (age 51)
- Place of birth: Stryn, Norway
- Position: Striker

Senior career*
Years	Team	Apps	(Gls)
- Stryn
1995–1996	Brann	10	(1)
1998–1999	Start	33	(7)
2000	Førde		
- Loen IL

International career
1995	Norway U-21	2	(0)
- * Club domestic league appearances and goals

Asbjørn Tenden (born 9 April 1975) is a Norwegian footballer.

From 1995 to 1996 he played 10 games in the Norwegian Premier League for SK Brann. In that period he scored one goal in the game against Ham-Kam at Brann Stadion on 27 August 1995 when he came on a substitute for Frank Strandli in the 89th minute.

In the 1996 season he only played one league game as a substitute and left the club after the season. Before he left the club after the season he also got five minutes as a substitute in a game in the UEFA Cup Winners' Cup against PSV Eindhoven.

In IK Start he played 33 games and scored seven goals in the Norwegian Premier League.

Later he has played for local clubs such as Førde and later Loen IL on the lower levels of the Norwegian league system. He is the brother of footballer Steinar Tenden.
