= Tore André Flo =

Norwegian footballer and coach (born 1973)

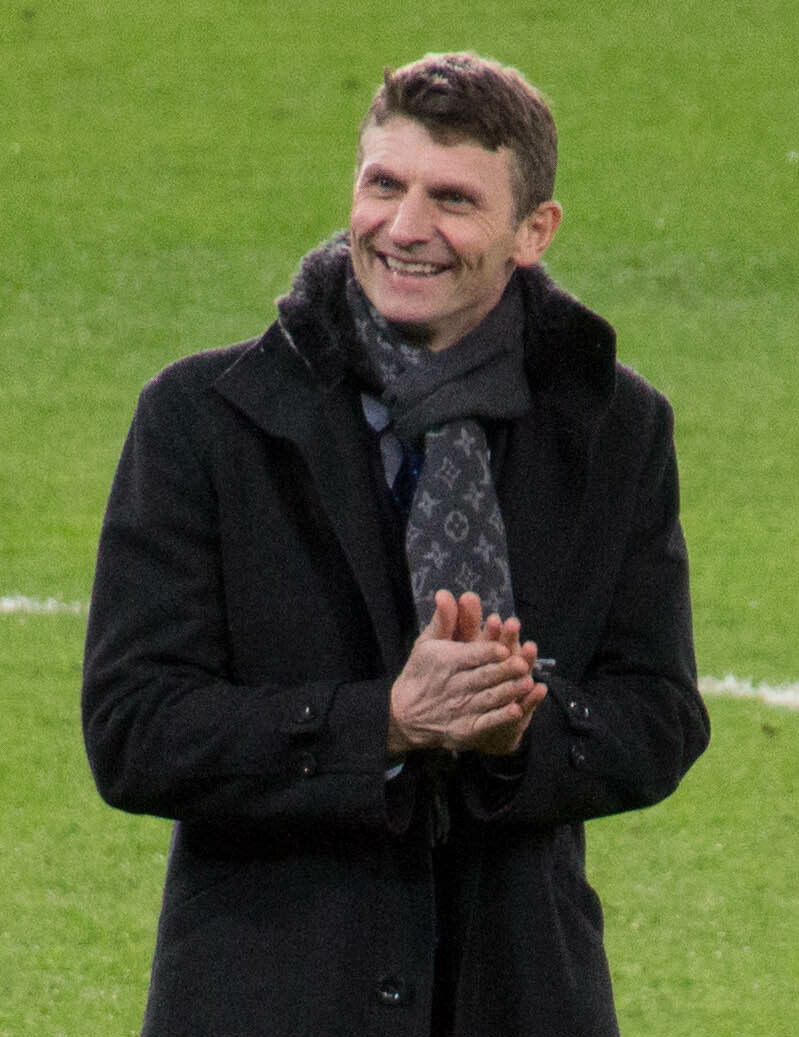
- Flo in 2018

Personal information
- Full name: Tore André Flo
- Date of birth: 15 June 1973 (age 53)
- Place of birth: Flo, Stryn Municipality, Norway
- Height: 1.93 m (6 ft 4 in)
- Position: Forward

Team information
- Current team: Norway youth (manager)

Youth career
- Stryn

Senior career*
| Years | Team | Apps | (Gls) |
| 1993–1994 | Sogndal | 44 | (21) |
| 1995 | Tromsø | 26 | (18) |
| 1996–1997 | Brann | 40 | (28) |
| 1997–2000 | Chelsea | 112 | (34) |
| 2000–2002 | Rangers | 53 | (29) |
| 2002–2003 | Sunderland | 29 | (4) |
| 2003–2005 | Siena | 63 | (13) |
| 2005–2006 | Vålerenga | 24 | (4) |
| 2007–2008 | Leeds United | 23 | (4) |
| 2008–2009 | Milton Keynes Dons | 13 | (0) |
| 2011–2012 | Sogndal | 22 | (2) |
| Total | | 449 | (157) |

International career
| 1995–2004 | Norway | 76 | (23) |

Managerial career
- 2022–2024: Sogndal
- 2025–: Norway youth
- * Club domestic league appearances and goals

Tore André Flo (born 15 June 1973) is a Norwegian professional football coach and a former striker who previously was the manager of 1. divisjon club Sogndal.

He was capped 76 times, scoring 23 goals for Norway, and represented his country in 1998 FIFA World Cup and UEFA Euro 2000, and scored Norway's first goal when Norway won 2–1 against Brazil and advanced to the second round of the 1998 World Cup.

During his professional career, he played for Sogndal, Tromsø and Brann in Tippeligaen, before he moved abroad and played for Chelsea. After a successful spell with the English club, he was sold to Rangers for £12 million and became the most expensive Norwegian player. Flo later had spells at Sunderland, Siena, Vålerenga and Leeds United before he announced his retirement in March 2008. He later made two comebacks; for Milton Keynes Dons in November 2008 and the Norwegian club Sogndal in March 2011. In August 2012 he announced his retirement for the third time. He subsequently rejoined Chelsea as a member of their coaching staff.

== Early life ==
Flo hails from the village of Flo in Stryn Municipality in Sogn og Fjordane, Norway. He comes from a family of footballers.

== Club career ==
=== Sogndal ===
Flo started his career with his local amateur club Stryn. In 1993, he moved to Sogndal, playing with his brothers Jostein and Jarle. Tore André Flo made his debut in Tippeligaen on 17 April 1994 against Tromsø. When Sogndal was relegated from Tippeligaen in 1994, Flo was transferred to Tromsø.

=== Tromsø ===
In Tromsø, Flo became a success: he scored 18 goals in the 1995-season, and was the club's top goalscorer. His performances in that season culminated in Flo making his debut for the Norwegian national team.

=== Brann ===
Flo moved to Bergen in 1996 to play for Brann. He continued to play well, and scored 28 goals during his stay there. During his years in Brann, Flo arguably became one of Norway's best attackers.

In the first half of the 1997 season, however, he was not considered a great success by most of the Brann fans, perhaps because his mind was already in Chelsea, which he signed for under disputed circumstances. He did, however, score a hat-trick in his last game for Brann before leaving for Chelsea.

=== Chelsea ===
Flo was bought for £300,000 by the English Premier League team Chelsea in the summer of 1997.

Flo made his debut for Chelsea against Coventry City, and scored in a 3–2 loss for his side. He scored 15 goals in his debut season for Chelsea, including a hat-trick in a 6–1 win over Tottenham Hotspur at White Hart Lane and two in a 6–2 win over Crystal Palace as Chelsea finished 4th in the Premier League and won the League Cup and the Cup Winners' Cup. Flo made a particularly important contribution in the latter tournament, hitting two away goals against Real Betis in the quarter-finals.

A year later, as Chelsea challenged for the title, Flo hit ten league goals, but constantly found his playing opportunities limited by manager Gianluca Vialli's squad rotation policy and the signing of Italian striker Pierluigi Casiraghi. The Blues eventually finished third, high enough for their first ever UEFA Champions League qualification. Flo scored 19 goals in the 1999–00 season, making him Chelsea's top scorer and helping the club win the FA Cup and reach the Champions League quarter-finals, where he scored twice in a 3–1 win over Barcelona at Stamford Bridge. He scored another at the Camp Nou in the return game against Barca, though the team ultimately lost 5–1 (it was 3–1 at full-time, with Chelsea conceding two goals in extra time). By the start of the 2000–01 season, Chelsea had signed strikers Jimmy Floyd Hasselbaink and Eiður Guðjohnsen, despite scoring two goals and assisting one in a 3–3 away tie against Manchester United, he was again forced onto the substitutes' bench, and he requested a move away. He made 163 appearances for Chelsea (70 of which were as a substitute) and scored 50 goals.

=== Rangers ===
In November 2000, Flo was sold to Scottish Premier League team Rangers, in a record £12 million deal, making Flo the most expensive Norwegian player ever at the time, Rangers' most expensive signing and the biggest transfer by any Scottish club.

Much was expected of Flo, and he started off well by scoring on his début in a 5–1 victory over Rangers' archrivals Celtic, and hit 18 goals in 30 SPL games. His second season at Rangers was considered his best in Scotland, scoring 22 goals in 42 games, including the opening goal in the 2002 League Cup final win over Ayr United.

=== Sunderland ===
He was sold to Sunderland on transfer deadline day at the beginning of the 2002–03 season. Flo's arrival was announced alongside fellow striker Marcus Stewart, and the total cost of the transfers were declared as £10m. The individual prices were not made clear by Sunderland, although a figure of £8.2 million for Flo was widely quoted by the media. Sunderland have since confirmed that he was bought for £6.75 million, making him Sunderland's second most expensive purchase. Sunderland's manager Peter Reid had been under-fire throughout pre-season for his failure to buy a big-name striker as a long-term replacement for the ageing Niall Quinn. The relatively high price-tag for a player who was struggling in Scotland, and the late hour of his signing led many fans, and pundits including legend Jimmy Montgomery to believe that Flo was a deadline-day panic buy. Once again he scored in his debut match, a 1–1 draw with Manchester United.

It was clear by Sunderland's tactics that Reid expected Flo to slot into the role of veteran Niall Quinn (who retired from playing in November) as a tall target-man for long-balls. It was not a role he was comfortable with, and he struggled to form a partnership with fellow striker Kevin Phillips. When Reid was sacked in October and replaced by Howard Wilkinson, Flo immediately fell out of favour – failing to make the bench for Wilkinson's first game – as Wilkinson publicly called into question the Norwegian's fitness. Flo managed to work his way back into the first-team until Wilkinson's dismissal in March. His successor, Mick McCarthy failed to give Flo 90 minutes of football in any of the remaining nine games of the season.

In 33 appearances for Sunderland Flo scored only 6 goals (4 of them in the Premiership) completing only 11 of the 23 league games he started. Sunderland were relegated to Division One, and with massive debts were forced to sell or release most players on high wages. Flo played one League Cup game in the 2003–04, but in the autumn of 2003 he was given a free transfer.

=== Siena ===
Flo then tried his luck in Italy, joining newly promoted Serie A team Siena on a free transfer in 2003. Flo played for Siena for two seasons, becoming a success in Italian football and helping the club establish themselves in the top division for the first time. He showed surprising versatility when he was asked by manager Giuseppe Papadopulo to play in a more withdrawn role as a second striker, behind Enrico Chiesa and Nicola Ventola, rather than in his usual role as a main striker. He excelled in this position and was ever-present for his club throughout the 2003–04 season, as he scored eight goals, helping Siena to avoid relegation: he scored his first goal for his new club against Empoli in the third round of the league on 20 September. The next goal came against Reggina in the sixth round 18 October. Later becoming matchwinner in a 1–0 home win against Udinese.

His second and last season with the club was less successful, as injuries and competition from other strikers saw him gain less playing time under manager Gigi Simoni; he only managed five goals from 17 starts throughout the 2004–05 season, and made 5 appearances as substitute, although he once again helped Siena avoid relegation. He scored the only goal in a historic 1–0 first ever victory against rivals Fiorentina. He put on another brilliant performance in November against eventual finalists Roma in a 2–1 Coppa Italia away win where he scored both of his team's goals. Another two goals came in a 1–3 away win against Chievo in January, he also scored the 2–1 goal in a 2–2 home tie against eventual Coppa Italia champions Inter Milan.

=== Vålerenga ===
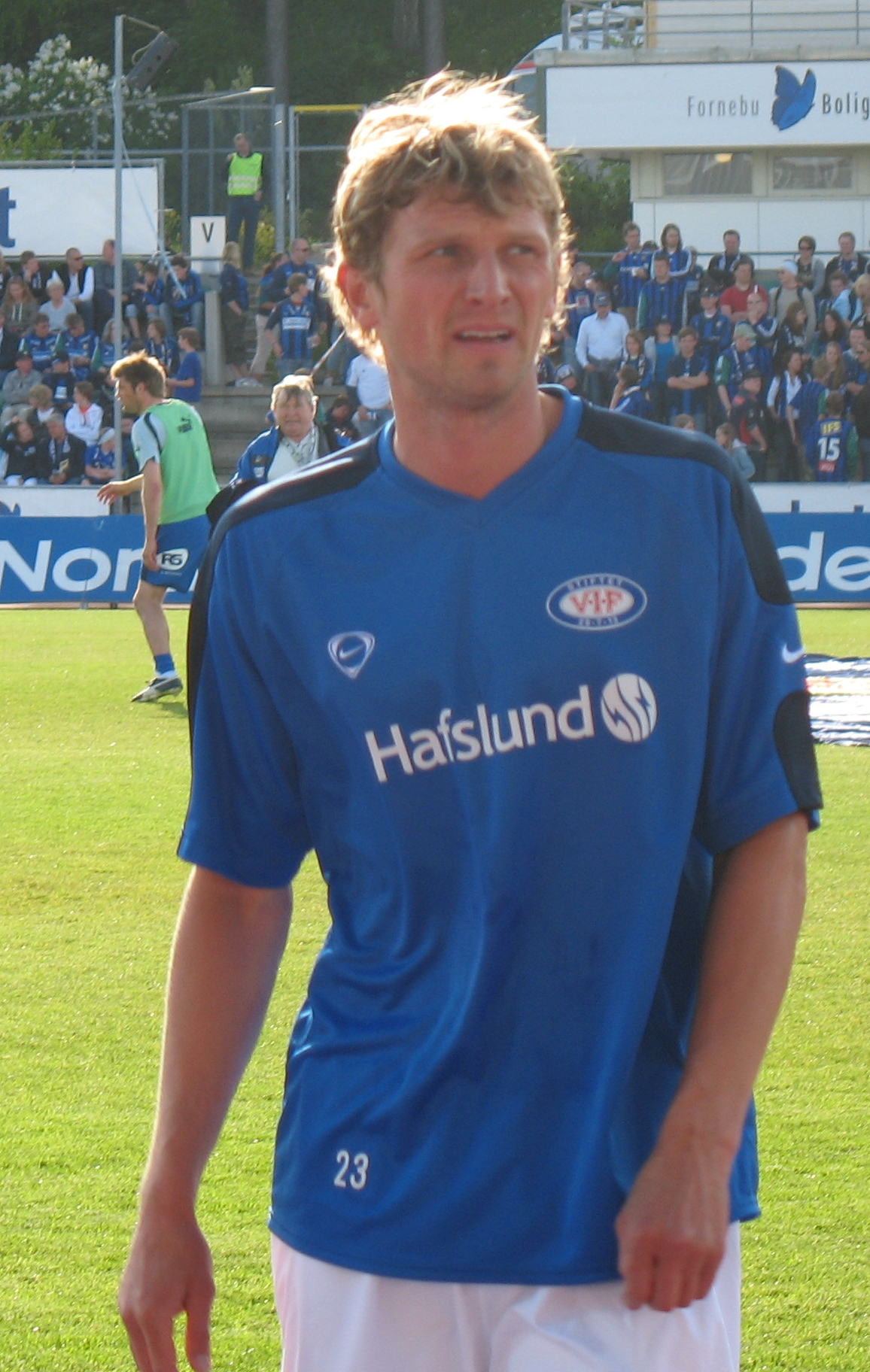
Flo playing for Vålerenga in June 2006

Flo signed for the ambitious club Vålerenga from Oslo in July 2005. He was contracted to the club until the end of the 2006 season. His stay at Vålerenga was hampered by numerous injuries that prevented him of making a serious impact. Vålerenga did not offer him a new contract at the end of the season, leaving Flo free to sign with other clubs.

=== Leeds United ===
On 3 January 2007, former teammate Dennis Wise brought Flo back to England, this time for Leeds United, with a contract lasting till the end of the 2006–07 Championship season. Flo made his away début as a substitute for the Yorkshire outfit in Leeds' 3–1 defeat to West Bromwich Albion in the FA Cup. A week later Flo scored his first goal for Leeds against the same opposition after three minutes with a towering header in a league match which ended in a 3–2 defeat. Subsequent injury prevented Flo from playing any significant part during the rest of the season. Flo was believed to be set to leave Leeds due to a clause in his contract, but Leeds signed Flo with an initial one-year contract to help their 2007–08 League One campaign. He only managed to score 3 times in the League during the season, all in sub appearances. Flo was sponsored by famous Leeds fans, the Kaiser Chiefs. Flo had previously admitted that Leeds would probably be his last club before retirement. He turned into somewhat of a fans favourite without playing that much for Leeds.

In March 2008, Flo announced his retirement from football.

=== Milton Keynes Dons ===
On 21 November 2008, Flo came out of retirement and signed a contract with Milton Keynes Dons that lasted until the end of the season. He played his first match for MK Dons coming on as a sub against Scunthorpe on 6 December 2008. He didn't start a match until the 3rd last game of the season against Walsall. Flo also had the misfortune of missing the ninth penalty in a tense shoot-out against Scunthorpe United which prevented MK Dons from reaching the 2009 League one play-off final at Wembley.

On 19 May 2009, Flo was released from his contract with Milton Keynes Dons.

=== Sogndal ===
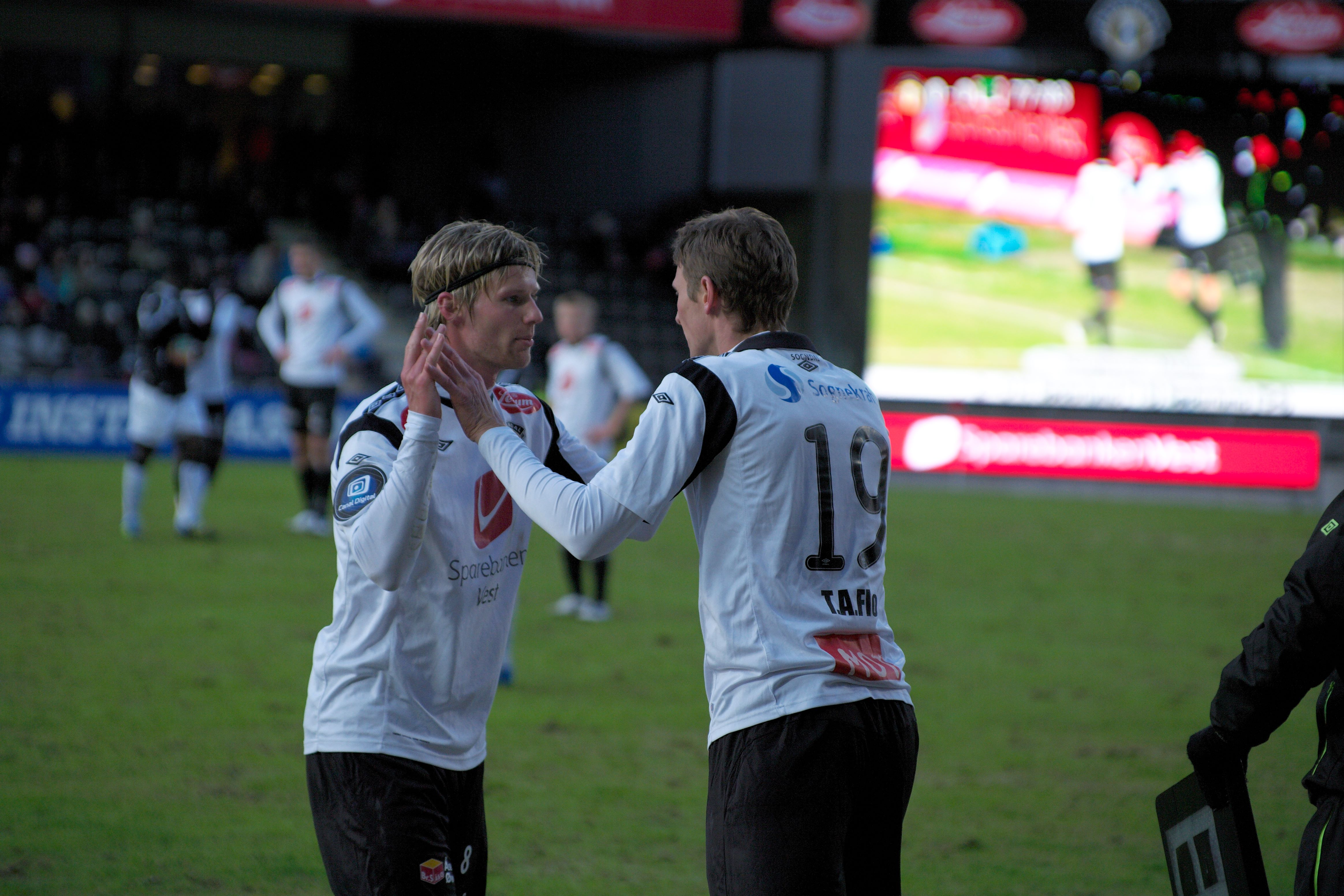
Tore André Flo (right) and Ulrik Flo.

In 2011, two years after retirement, Flo surprisingly made a second comeback at newly promoted Sogndal. He first came on as a substitute against Rosenborg on 30 July. In his first start at the last day of the season he scored both goals in a 2–1 victory against league champions Molde, then coached by Ole Gunnar Solskjær.

== International career ==
Flo made 76 appearances for the Norwegian national team and made his debut in a 0–0 draw with England. He scored 23 goals, making him Norway's joint-4th highest goalscorer, along with Ole Gunnar Solskjær. He gained the nickname Flonaldo (a play on Brazilian striker Ronaldo) when Norway beat Brazil 4–2 in a friendly match. Flo played for Norway at the 1998 FIFA World Cup, scoring a goal in a 2–1 win over holders Brazil as they reached the second round. Flo chose to retire from international football in 2004, deciding to prioritise his family.

== Style of play ==
Flo was a quick, tall, powerful, and physically strong striker, with an eye for goal, who was known for his ability in the air; in spite of his size, he also possessed good technical skills, and was capable of playing off of his teammates.

== Managerial career ==
After retiring from playing in 2012, Flo returned his former club Chelsea as a club ambassador and a coach in their Academy (Chelsea Development Squad and Academy), working with their youth development teams, most often the Under-14s. He was later on promoted to a loan player technical coach working under the loan department of Chelsea.

On 17 November 2021, Flo was announced as the new head coach of Sogndal in Norway for the 2022 season, the club he began and ended his playing career.

In February 2025, Flo was appointed as manager in the Norwegian youth national team pool, taking charge of one of Norway U15, Norway U16 and Norway U17.

== Personal life ==
Flo comes from a family of footballers, with seven members of his family having played in Tippeligaen. His brother Jostein Flo and his cousin Håvard Flo have also played for a number of clubs abroad and been capped for Norway. The brothers Kjell Rune Flo and Jarle Flo have played in Tippeligaen for Molde and Sogndal, respectively. In addition have Kjell Rune's son Ulrik Flo and Håvard's nephew Per Egil Flo played for Sogndal in Tippeligaen. Flo supports Birmingham City.

The best man at Tore André Flo's wedding was Helge Øvreberg, a former teammate in Sogndal, who also played for Ny-Krohnborg, Nest-Sotra, Frøya and Stryn.

=== Tore André Flo Academy ===
In 2010 Flo and football coach Sean Faulkner founded a football academy in Berkshire. It teaches children aged from 5 to 17 at schools, clubs and holiday camps. Flo coaches some sessions.

== Career statistics ==
=== Club ===
Appearances and goals by club, season and competition
| Club | Season | League | | | National cup (Note: Includes Norwegian Football Cup, FA Cup, Scottish Cup, Coppa Italia) | | League cup (Note: Includes Football League Cup, Scottish League Cup) | | Europe | | Total | |
| Club | Season | Division | Apps | Goals | Apps | Goals | Apps | Goals | Apps | Goals | Apps | Goals |
|---|---|---|---|---|---|---|---|---|---|---|---|---|
| Sogndal | 1993 | 1. divisjon | 22 | 16 | 3 | 5 | – | | – | | 25 | 21 |
| Sogndal | 1994 | Tippeligaen | 22 | 5 | 3 | 3 | – | | – | | 25 | 8 |
| Sogndal | Total | | 44 | 21 | 6 | 8 | – | | – | | 50 | 29 |
| Tromsø | 1995 | Tippeligaen | 26 | 18 | | | – | | – | | 26 | 18 |
| Brann | 1996 | Tippeligaen | 24 | 19 | | | – | | 4 (Note: Appearances in UEFA Cup Winners' Cup) | 4 | 28 | 23 |
| Brann | 1997 | Tippeligaen | 16 | 9 | | | – | | 6 (Note: Appearances in UEFA Cup) | 2 | 22 | 11 |
| Brann | Total | | 40 | 28 | | | – | | 10 | 6 | 50 | 34 |
| Chelsea | 1997–98 | Premier League | 34 | 11 | 1 | 0 | 4 | 2 | 5 | 2 | 44 | 15 |
| Chelsea | 1998–99 | Premier League | 30 | 10 | 3 | 0 | 3 | 1 | 9 | 2 | 45 | 13 |
| Chelsea | 1999–2000 | Premier League | 34 | 10 | 6 | 1 | 1 | 0 | 16 (Note: Appearances in UEFA Champions League) | 8 | 57 | 19 |
| Chelsea | 2000–01 | Premier League | 14 | 3 | 0 | 0 | 1 | 0 | 2 | 0 | 17 | 3 |
| Chelsea | Total | | 112 | 34 | 10 | 1 | 9 | 3 | 32 | 12 | 163 | 50 |
| Rangers | 2000–01 | Scottish Premier League | 19 | 11 | 2 | 2 | 1 | 0 | 0 | 0 | 22 | 13 |
| Rangers | 2001–02 | Scottish Premier League | 30 | 18 | 3 | 2 | 2 | 1 | 11 (Note: Four appearances and three goals in UEFA Champions League, seven appearances and one goal in UEFA Cup) | 4 | 46 | 25 |
| Rangers | 2002–03 | Scottish Premier League | 4 | 0 | – | | – | | – | | 4 | 0 |
| Rangers | Total | | 53 | 29 | 5 | 4 | 3 | 1 | 11 | 4 | 72 | 38 |
| Sunderland | 2002–03 | Premier League | 29 | 4 | 2 | 0 | 1 | 2 | – | | 32 | 6 |
| Sunderland | 2003–04 | First Division | 0 | 0 | 0 | 0 | 1 | 0 | – | | 1 | 0 |
| Sunderland | Total | | 29 | 4 | 2 | 0 | 2 | 2 | – | | 33 | 6 |
| Siena | 2003–04 | Serie A | 33 | 8 | – | | – | | – | | 33 | 8 |
| Siena | 2004–05 | Serie A | 30 | 5 | 1 | 2 | – | | – | | 31 | 7 |
| Siena | Total | | 63 | 13 | 1 | 2 | – | | – | | 64 | 15 |
| Vålerenga | 2005 | Tippeligaen | 8 | 0 | – | | – | | – | | 8 | 0 |
| Vålerenga | 2006 | Tippeligaen | 16 | 4 | – | | – | | – | | 16 | 4 |
| Vålerenga | Total | | 24 | 4 | – | | – | | – | | 24 | 4 |
| Leeds United | 2006–07 | Championship | 1 | 1 | 1 | 0 | 0 | 0 | – | | 2 | 1 |
| Leeds United | 2007–08 | League One | 22 | 3 | 0 | 0 | 0 | 0 | – | | 22 | 3 |
| Leeds United | Total | | 23 | 4 | 1 | 0 | 0 | 0 | – | | 24 | 4 |
| MK Dons | 2008–09 | League One | 13 | 0 | 0 | 0 | 0 | 0 | – | | 13 | 0 |
| Sogndal | 2011 | Tippeligaen | 9 | 2 | 0 | 0 | – | | – | | 9 | 2 |
| Sogndal | 2012 | Tippeligaen | 13 | 0 | 1 | 0 | – | | – | | 14 | 0 |
| Sogndal | Total | | 22 | 2 | 1 | 0 | – | | – | | 23 | 2 |
| Career total | | | 469 | 173 | 25 | 15 | 13 | 6 | 43 | 16 | 550 | 210 |

=== International ===
Appearances and goals by national team and year
| National team | Year | Apps | Goals |
|---|---|---|---|
| Norway | 1995 | 4 | 1 |
| Norway | 1996 | 4 | 0 |
| Norway | 1997 | 12 | 8 |
| Norway | 1998 | 14 | 6 |
| Norway | 1999 | 9 | 6 |
| Norway | 2000 | 11 | 0 |
| Norway | 2001 | 5 | 0 |
| Norway | 2002 | 4 | 0 |
| Norway | 2003 | 10 | 2 |
| Norway | 2004 | 3 | 0 |
| Total | | 76 | 23 |

Scores and results list Norway's goal tally first, score column indicates score after each Flo goal.

List of international goals scored by Tore André Flo
| No. | Date | Venue | Opponent | Score | Result | Competition | Ref. |
|---|---|---|---|---|---|---|---|
| 1 | 29 November 1995 | Queen's Park Oval, Port of Spain, Trinidad and Tobago | Trinidad and Tobago | 1–0 | 2–3 | Friendly | |
| 2 | 29 March 1997 | Sharjah Stadium, Sharjah, UAE | United Arab Emirates | 1–0 | 4–1 | Friendly | |
| 3 | 29 March 1997 | Sharjah Stadium, Sharjah, UAE | United Arab Emirates | 2–1 | 4–1 | Friendly | |
| 4 | 29 March 1997 | Sharjah Stadium, Sharjah, UAE | United Arab Emirates | 3–1 | 4–1 | Friendly | |
| 5 | 30 May 1997 | Ullevaal Stadion, Oslo, Norway | Brazil | 2–0 | 4–2 | Friendly | |
| 6 | 30 May 1997 | Ullevaal Stadion, Oslo, Norway | Brazil | 3–1 | 4–2 | Friendly | |
| 7 | 20 August 1997 | Helsinki Olympic Stadium, Helsinki, Finland | Finland | 4–0 | 4–0 | 1998 FIFA World Cup qualification | |
| 8 | 6 September 1997 | Tofiq Bahramov Republican Stadium, Baku, Azerbaijan | Azerbaijan | 1–0 | 1–0 | 1998 FIFA World Cup qualification | |
| 9 | 10 September 1997 | Ullevaal Stadion, Oslo, Norway | Switzerland | 5–0 | 5–0 | 1998 FIFA World Cup qualification | |
| 10 | 25 February 1998 | Stade Vélodrome, Marseille, France | France | 2–2 | 3–3 | Friendly | |
| 11 | 22 April 1998 | Parken Stadium, Copenhagen, Denmark | Denmark | 2–0 | 2–0 | Friendly | |
| 12 | 27 May 1998 | Aker Stadion, Molde, Norway | Saudi Arabia | 5–0 | 6–0 | Friendly | |
| 13 | 23 June 1998 | Stade Vélodrome, Marseille, France | Brazil | 1–1 | 2–1 | 1998 FIFA World Cup | |
| 14 | 10 October 1998 | Bežigrad Stadium, Ljubljana, Slovenia | Slovenia | 1–1 | 2–1 | UEFA Euro 2000 qualifying | |
| 15 | 18 November 1998 | Cairo International Stadium, Cairo, Egypt | Egypt | 1–1 | 1–1 | Friendly | |
| 16 | 28 April 1999 | Boris Paitchadze National Stadium, Tbilisi, Georgia | Georgia | 2–0 | 4–1 | UEFA Euro 2000 qualifying | |
| 17 | 28 April 1999 | Boris Paitchadze National Stadium, Tbilisi, Georgia | Georgia | 4–0 | 4–1 | UEFA Euro 2000 qualifying | |
| 18 | 20 May 1999 | Ullevaal Stadion, Oslo, Norway | Jamaica | 1–0 | 6–0 | Friendly | |
| 19 | 20 May 1999 | Ullevaal Stadion, Oslo, Norway | Jamaica | 2–0 | 6–0 | Friendly | |
| 20 | 5 June 1999 | Arena Kombëtare, Tirana, Albania | Albania | 2–1 | 2–1 | UEFA Euro 2000 qualifying | |
| 21 | 9 October 1999 | Daugava Stadium, Riga, Latvia | Latvia | 2–1 | 2–1 | UEFA Euro 2000 qualifying | |
| 22 | 22 May 2003 | Ullevaal Stadion, Oslo, Norway | Finland | 2–0 | 2–0 | Friendly | |
| 23 | 11 October 2003 | Ullevaal Stadion, Oslo, Norway | Luxembourg | 1–0 | 1–0 | UEFA Euro 2004 qualifying | |

=== Managerial statistics ===
Managerial record by team and tenure
| Team | From | To | Record | | | | | | | | Ref |
| Team | From | To | G | W | D | L | GF | GA | GD | Win % | Ref |
|---|---|---|---|---|---|---|---|---|---|---|---|
| Sogndal | 1 January 2022 | 30 September 2024 | 89 | 35 | 20 | 34 | 157 | 146 | +11 | 39.33 | |

== Honours ==
=== Player ===
Brann

- Tippeligaen runner-up: 1997

Chelsea

- FA Cup: 1999–2000
- Football League Cup: 1997–98
- FA Charity Shield: 2000
- UEFA Cup Winners' Cup: 1997–98
- UEFA Super Cup: 1998

Rangers

- Scottish Cup: 2001–02
- Scottish League Cup: 2001–02

=== Coach ===
Individual

- Norwegian First Division Coach of the Month: July 2023
