= Högaborgs BK =

Swedish football club

- Full name: Högaborgs Bollklubb
- Founded: 1927 (93 years ago)
- Ground: Harlyckans IP; Helsingborg; Sweden
- Capacity: 2,000
- Chairman: Henrik Hedenskog
- Coach: Filip Kacaniklic
- League: Division 2 Sydvästra Götaland
- Division 2 Västra Götaland,
Home colours

Högaborgs BK is a Swedish football club from Helsingborg that was founded in 1927. They currently play in the Swedish fourth division (Division 2).

== Background ==
The club was founded in the spring 1927 by Sven Damberg and Lars Flodin and a group of friends. During their first year they played in blue shirts and white shorts, but in 1928 they changed to their current colours. The newly formed club also laid out a sports ground at Viskans vall in eastern Högaborg but were forced to move out in 1937 because Helsingborg municipality wanted to use the site for housing. The club played at Tre Torns plan in Jönköpingsgatan until 1942 when Harlyckans Idrottsplats was completed and the club moved there. Harlyckan has been the club's home ever since. In 1971 the club was expanded with a ladies section and in 1979 started a floorball section.

Since their foundation in 1927 Högaborgs BK has participated mainly in the middle and lower divisions of the Swedish football league system. The club currently plays in Division 2 Västra Götaland which is the fourth tier of Swedish football. They play their home matches at the Harlyckans IP in Helsingborg.

Högaborgs BK are affiliated to the Skånes Fotbollförbund.

== Season to season ==
Season	Level	Division	Section	Position	Movements
1993	Tier 4	Division 3	Södra Götaland	2nd	Promotion Playoffs
1994	Tier 4	Division 3	Södra Götaland	2nd	Promotion Playoffs
1995	Tier 4	Division 3	Södra Götaland	1st	Promoted
1996	Tier 3	Division 2	Södra Götaland	2nd	Promotion Playoffs
1997	Tier 3	Division 2	Södra Götaland	7th	
1998	Tier 3	Division 2	Södra Götaland	10th	Relegation Playoffs
1999	Tier 3	Division 2	Södra Götaland	2nd	
2000	Tier 3	Division 2	Södra Götaland	8th	
2001	Tier 3	Division 2	Södra Götaland	8th	
2002	Tier 3	Division 2	Södra Götaland	3rd	
2003	Tier 3	Division 2	Södra Götaland	6th	
2004	Tier 3	Division 2	Södra Götaland	9th	
2005	Tier 3	Division 2	Södra Götaland	11th	Relegated
2006*	Tier 5	Division 3	Sydvästra Götaland	1st	Promoted
2007	Tier 4	Division 2	Södra Götaland	4th	
2008	Tier 4	Division 2	Södra Götaland	10th	Relegation Playoffs
2009	Tier 4	Division 2	Västra Götaland	8th	
2010	Tier 4	Division 2	Södra Götaland	7th	
2011	Tier 4	Division 2	Södra Götaland	8th	
2012	Tier 4	Division 2	Södra Götaland	3rd	
2013	Tier 4	Division 2	Västra Götaland	11th	Relegation Playoffs – Not Relegated
2014	Tier 4	Division 2	Västra Götaland	5th	
2015	Tier 4	Division 2	Västra Götaland	11th	
2016	Tier 4	Division 2	Västra Götaland	13th	Relegated
2017	Tier 5	Division 3	Sydvästra Götaland	1st	Promoted
2018	Tier 4	Division 2	Västra Götaland	14th	Relegated

* League restructuring in 2006 resulted in a new division being created at Tier 3 and subsequent divisions dropping a level.

== Attendances ==
In recent seasons Högaborgs BK have had the following average attendances:

Season	Average attendance	Division / Section	Level
2005	241	Div 2 Södra Götaland	Tier 4
2006	163	Div 3 Sydvästra Götaland	Tier 5
2007	202	Div 2 Södra Götaland	Tier 4
2008	248	Div 2 Södra Götaland	Tier 4
2009	244	Div 2 Västra Götaland	Tier 4
2010	181	Div 2 Södra Götaland	Tier 4
2011	176	Div 2 Södra Götaland	Tier 4
2012	216	Div 2 Södra Götaland	Tier 4
2013	Not Available	Div 2 Västra Götaland	Tier 4
2014	253	Div 2 Västra Götaland	Tier 4
2015	Not Available	Div 2 Västra Götaland	Tier 4
2016	Not Available	Div 2 Västra Götaland	Tier 4
2017	108	Div 3 Sydvästra Götaland	Tier 5
2018	135	Div 2 Västra Götaland	Tier 4

* Attendances are provided in the Publikliga sections of the Svenska Fotbollförbundet website.

== Notable former players ==
- Daniel Andersson
- Stendy Appeltoft
- Jesper Jansson
- Abdul Khalili
- Imad Khalili
- Henrik Larsson
- Jordan Larsson
- Mats Magnusson
- Daniel Nannskog
- Marcus Olsson
- Martin Olsson
- Joakim Persson
- Moustafa Zeidan
