= Per-Egil Flo =

Norwegian footballer (born 1989)

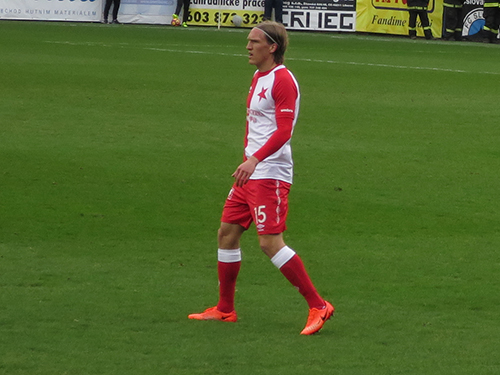

Personal information
- Full name: Per-Egil Hough Flo
- Date of birth: 18 January 1989 (age 37)
- Place of birth: Stryn, Norway
- Height: 6 ft 0 in (1.83 m)
- Position: Defender

Team information
- Current team: Sogndal
- Number: 13

Youth career
- Stryn

Senior career*
Years	Team	Apps	(Gls)
2006–2013	Sogndal	165	(5)
2013–2016	Molde	78	(6)
2017–2018	Slavia Prague	13	(0)
2018–2021	Lausanne-Sport	93	(4)
2021–	Sogndal	115	(7)

International career^{‡}
2009	Norway U-21	3	(0)
2011–2012	Norway U-23	3	(0)
2014–2017	Norway	5	(0)
Medal record
Molde
Winner	Tippeligaen	2014
Slavia Prague
Winner	Czech First League	2016–17
Winner	Czech Cup	2017–18
Runner-up	Czech First League	2017–18
Lausanne-Sport
Winner	Swiss Challenge League	2019–20
- * Club domestic league appearances and goals as of 1 December 2025 ‡ National team caps and goals as of 23 April 2018

Per-Egil Hough Flo (born 18 January 1989) is a Norwegian footballer who plays as a defender for Sogndal. He is the nephew of Håvard Flo and first cousin once removed of Jostein Flo, Jarle Flo and Tore André Flo.

== Career ==
=== Club ===
After progressing through Sogndal's youth team, Flo went on to play for the first team in the 2006 season, before he joined Molde in July 2013.

On 29 December 2016, Molde announced that Flo had left the club to sign a 2.5-year contract with Slavia Prague. On 17 July 2018, Flo signed for the Swiss club Lausanne-Sport.

== Career statistics ==
=== Club ===
As of match played 28 June 2025

Appearances and goals by club, season and competition
Club	Season	League			National Cup		Continental		Other		Total	
Club	Season	Division	Apps	Goals	Apps	Goals	Apps	Goals	Apps	Goals	Apps	Goals
Sogndal	2006	Adeccoligaen	15	0			-		-		15	0
Sogndal	2007	Adeccoligaen	12	0			-		-		12	0
Sogndal	2008	Adeccoligaen	29	3	4	1	-		-		33	4
Sogndal	2009	Adeccoligaen	26	0	2	0	-		1	0	29	0
Sogndal	2010	Adeccoligaen	27	2	4	0	-		-		31	2
Sogndal	2011	Tippeligaen	29	0	3	1	-		-		32	1
Sogndal	2012	Tippeligaen	16	0	0	0	-		-		16	0
Sogndal	2013	Tippeligaen	11	0	0	0	-		-		24	2
Sogndal	Total		165	5	13	2	-	-	1	0	179	7
Molde	2013	Tippeligaen	8	0	1	0	0	0	-		9	0
Molde	2014	Tippeligaen	24	1	4	1	4	0	-		32	2
Molde	2015	Tippeligaen	25	3	2	0	6	0	-		33	3
Molde	2016	Tippeligaen	21	2	1	0	2	0	-		24	2
Molde	Total		78	6	8	1	12	0	-	-	98	7
Slavia Prague	2016–17	HET liga	11	0	1	0	0	0	-		12	0
Slavia Prague	2017–18	HET liga	2	0	3	1	0	0	-		5	1
Slavia Prague	Total		13	0	4	1	0	0	-	-	17	1
Lausanne-Sport	2018–19	Swiss Challenge League	32	0	1	0	0	0	-		33	0
Lausanne-Sport	2019–20	Swiss Challenge League	30	2	2	0	0	0	-		32	2
Lausanne-Sport	2020–21	Swiss Super League	31	2	1	0	0	0	-		32	2
Lausanne-Sport	Total		93	4	4	0	0	0	-	-	97	4
Sogndal	2021	OBOS-ligaen	28	3	0	0	-		-		28	3
Sogndal	2022	OBOS-ligaen	18	0	0	0	-		-		18	0
Sogndal	2023	OBOS-ligaen	24	1	3	1	-		-		27	2
Sogndal	2024	OBOS-ligaen	19	2	2	0	-		-		21	2
Sogndal	2025	OBOS-ligaen	9	0	1	0	-		-		10	0
Sogndal	Total		98	6	6	1	-	-	-	-	104	7
Career total			447	21	35	5	12	0	1	0	495	26

=== International ===
Norway national team
Year	Apps	Goals
2014	4	0
2015	0	0
2016	0	0
2017	1	0
Total	5	0

Statistics accurate as of match played 13 June 2017

== Honours ==
Sogndal

- Adeccoligaen (1): 2010

Molde

- Tippeligaen (1): 2014
- Norwegian Cup (2): 2013, 2014

Slavia Prague

- HET liga (1): 2016–17
- MOL Cup (1): 2017–18

Lausanne-Sport

- Swiss Challenge League (1): 2019–20
