= Dan Ito =

Japanese footballer

Dan Itō 伊藤 壇
Personal information
- Full name: Dan Itō
- Date of birth: 3 November 1976 (age 49)
- Place of birth: Sapporo, Hokkaido, Japan
- Height: 1.73 m (5 ft 8 in)
- Position: Midfielder

Youth career
- 1991–1993: Noboribetsu Otani High School
- 1994–1997: Sendai University

Senior career*
Years	Team	Apps	(Gls)
1998–1999	Vegalta Sendai	30	(2)
2000	Sapporo Shukyu-Dan	10	(4)
2001	Woodlands Wellington		(4)
2002	Westgate		(1)
2003	Saigon Port		
2004	Kitchee		
2004	Osotspa	4	
2004	Kitchee		
2005	Penang	5	(3)
2005–2006	QAF	4	(1)
2006	Valencia		
2006	QAF	0	(0)
2006	DPMM	10	(0)
2007–2008	QAF		(12)
2008	Tuen Mun Progoal	7	(2)
2009	Windsor Arch Ka I	9	(8)
2009–2011	Churchill Brothers		
2011	Rakhapura United	8	
2011	Manang Marshyangdi		
2012–2013	Build Bright United	7	(9)
2013	Green Archers United	7	(0)
2013	Erchim	18	(12)
2014	Lao Toyota		
2014	Yotha		
2015	Thimphu	2	
2016	Colombo	12	(5)
2017	Ponta Leste	5	
2019	Guam Rovers		
- * Club domestic league appearances and goals

Dan Itō (伊藤 壇, Itō Dan; born 3 November 1975) is a Japanese former professional football player. His last team was Rovers FC in Guam.

== Club career ==
Known for his peregrinating football career, Itō has traveled and played as a foreign footballer in 19 countries or regions around the Asian Pacific area, including Australia, Singapore, Vietnam, Thailand, Malaysia, Brunei, Maldives, Hong Kong, Macau, India, Myanmar, Nepal, Cambodia, Philippines, Mongolia, Laos, Bhutan, and Sri Lanka.

Itō appeared for the Hong Kong League XI selection which participated at the 2004 Carlsberg Cup.

== Club statistics ==
Season	Club	League	J.League		J.League Cup		Total	
Season	Club	League	Apps	Goals	Apps	Goals	Apps	Goals
1998	Brummell Sendai	Football League	23	2	4	0	27	2
1999	Vegalta Sendai	J2 League	7	0	2	0	9	0
Total			30	2	6	0	36	2
