= Fredric Lundqvist =

Swedish footballer

Personal information
- Full name: Fredric Tommy Lundqvist
- Date of birth: 3 August 1976 (age 50)
- Place of birth: Luleå, Sweden
- Position: Defender

Youth career
- Gammelstads IF

Senior career*
Years	Team	Apps	(Gls)
1994	Lira BK	17	(0)
1995–1998	IFK Luleå	117	(1)
1999	Lira BK	23	(1)
2000–2005	GIF Sundsvall	127	(13)
2005–2007	Viking FK	5	(0)
Total		261	(15)

International career
1994	Sweden U19	6	(0)
2003–2005	Sweden	5	(0)
- * Club domestic league appearances and goals

Fredric Tommy Lundqvist (born 3 August 1976) is a Swedish former professional footballer who played as a defender. He is best remembered for his time in Allsvenskan with GIF Sundsvall, but also represented Lira BK, IFK Luleå, and Viking FK during a career that spanned between 1994 and 2007. A full international between 2003 and 2005, he won five caps for the Sweden national team.

== Club career ==
Starting his career with Gammelstads IF, Lundqvist played in Division 2 and Division 1 with Lira BK and IFK Luleå before making his Allsvenskan debut for GIF Sundsvall during the 2000 season. In 2005, he signed a contract with the Tippeligaen club Viking FK. In early 2007 he announced his retirement from professional football after having appeared in only five games with Viking FK after a long battle with an Achilles injury.

== International career ==
Lundqvist represented the Sweden U19 team six times before making his full international debut for Sweden on 18 February 2003 in a friendly game against North Korea. He was on the bench for two UEFA Euro 2004 qualifying games against San Marino and Poland, but never appeared in a competitive game for Sweden. He won his fifth and final cap in a friendly game against Mexico on 26 January 2005.

== Career statistics ==
=== Club ===
Appearances and goals by club, season and competition
Club	Season	League			Cup		Continental		Other		Total	
Club	Season	Division	Apps	Goals	Apps	Goals	Apps	Goals	Apps	Goals	Apps	Goals
Lira BK	1994	Division 2 Norrland	17	0			–					
IFK Luleå	1995	Division 1 Norra	23	0			–					
IFK Luleå	1996	Division 1 Norra	25	0			–					
IFK Luleå	1997	Division 1 Norra	22	1			–					
IFK Luleå	1998	Division 1 Norra	24	0			–					
IFK Luleå	Total		117	1			–					
Lira BK	1999	Division 1 Norra	23	1			–					
GIF Sundsvall	2000	Allsvenskan	23	0								
GIF Sundsvall	2001	Allsvenskan	20	4								
GIF Sundsvall	2002	Allsvenskan	25	4								
GIF Sundsvall	2003	Allsvenskan	23	0								
GIF Sundsvall	2004	Allsvenskan	23	3								
GIF Sundsvall	2005	Allsvenskan	11	2								
GIF Sundsvall	Total		127	13								
Viking FK	2005	Tippeligaen	1	0								
Viking FK	2006	Tippeligaen	4	0								
Viking FK	Total		5	0								
Career total			261	15								

=== International ===
Appearances and goals by national team and year
National team	Year	Apps	Goals
Sweden	2003	4	0
Sweden	2004	0	0
Sweden	2005	1	0
Total		5	0

== Honours ==
Sweden

- King's Cup: 2003

Individual

- Årets Giffare (GIF Sundsvall Player of the Year): 2001
