= Håvard Flo =

Norwegian footballer (born 1970)

Personal information
- Date of birth: 4 April 1970 (age 56)
- Place of birth: Flo, Stryn Municipality, Norway
- Height: 1.87 m (6 ft 2 in)
- Position: Forward

Youth career
- 1980: Stryn

Senior career*
Years	Team	Apps	(Gls)
1990–1994	Sogndal	81	(20)
1994–1996	AGF	53	(27)
1996–1999	Werder Bremen	55	(5)
1999–2001	Wolverhampton Wanderers	38	(9)
2001–2008	Sogndal	157	(78)
2010	Sogndal	21	(3)
Total		403	(141)

International career
1996–2004	Norway	26	(7)
- * Club domestic league appearances and goals

Håvard Flo (born 4 April 1970) is a Norwegian former professional footballer who played as a forward. He played for Stryn and Sogndal, before he left Norway in 1994 and played for AGF, SV Werder Bremen and Wolverhampton Wanderers. He returned to Sogndal in 2001. He made a comeback for Sogndal in 2010.

== Career ==
Flo was born in Flo in Stryn Municipality. His most successful spell was in AGF, where he won the Danish Cup in 1996. The same year AGF finished second in the League – behind eventual champions Brøndby. AGF also won a bronze medal in the "Flo-era". Flo is still remembered in Aarhus as one of the best AGF players ever. In 2008, when Flo first announced his retirement, he returned to Aarhus for a final tribute in the half time break.

He was a member of the Norwegian squad at the 1998 FIFA World Cup in which he also scored in the tie against Scotland, and is a cousin of fellow footballers Jostein Flo, Tore André Flo and Jarle Flo. Håvard Flo's nephew Per Egil Flo also plays for Sogndal. His last match was in the second leg play-off against Aalesunds. Sogndal lost 7–2 on aggregate, but he scored the only Sogndal goal away and got applause even from the Aalesund fans.

Flo was a large and physically strong player, who was also renowned for having a good touch, in spite of his size.

== Career statistics ==
=== International ===
Appearances and goals by national team and year
National team	Year	Apps	Goals
Norway	1996	2	0
Norway	1997	3	1
Norway	1998	10	2
Norway	1999	1	0
Norway	2000	–	
Norway	2001	–	
Norway	2002	–	
Norway	2003	6	0
Norway	2004	4	4
Total		26	7

Scores and results list Norway's goal tally first, score column indicates score after each Flo goal.

List of international goals scored by Håvard Flo
No.	Date	Venue	Opponent	Score	Result	Competition
1	22 January 1997	Lang Park, Brisbane, Australia	New Zealand	3–0	3–0	1997 Australia Four Nations Tournament
2	20 May 1998	Bislett Stadium, Oslo, Norway	Mexico	2–0	5–2	Friendly
3	16 June 1998	Parc Lescure, Bordeaux, France	Scotland	1–0	1–1	1998 FIFA World Cup
4	22 January 2004	Hong Kong Stadium, So Kon Po, Hong Kong	Sweden	2–0	3–0	2004 Lunar New Year Cup
5	22 January 2004	Hong Kong Stadium, So Kon Po, Hong Kong	Sweden	3–0	3–0	2004 Lunar New Year Cup
6	28 January 2004	National Stadium, Kallang, Singapore	Singapore	3–2	5–2	Friendly
7	28 January 2004	National Stadium, Kallang, Singapore	Singapore	5–2	5–2	Friendly

== Honours ==
AGF

- Danish Cup: 1995–96

Werder Bremen

- UEFA Intertoto Cup: 1998
