= Steinar Tenden =

Norwegian footballer (born 1978)

Personal information
- Full name: Steinar Tenden
- Date of birth: 5 April 1978 (age 48)
- Place of birth: Stryn, Norway
- Height: 1.93 m (6 ft 4 in)
- Position: Striker

Senior career*
Years	Team	Apps	(Gls)
1999	Loen IL		
2000–2002	Stryn		
2003	KA Akureyri		
2004	Stryn		
2004	Brann	1	(0)
2005	Sogndal	6	(2)
2005	Førde		
Medal record
Norwegian Football Cup
Gold medal – first place	Norwegian Football Cup	2004
- * Club domestic league appearances and goals

Steinar Tenden (born 5 April 1978) is a Norwegian footballer who played as a striker for several teams in Norway and Iceland. He played one game in the Norwegian Premier League when he was in SK Brann.

== Career ==
Tenden initially started in his local club Loen IL, but transferred to Stryn higher in the Norwegian league system, where he scored 88 goals in 81 matches between 2000 and 2002. In 2003, he became one of the few Norwegians who have played in the Icelandic football when he played for KA Akureyri. In the last game of the season he scored a goal that secured KA Akureyri's place in the Úrvalsdeild. After the season, he returned to Stryn in 2004.

After impressing Brann's coach, Mons Ivar Mjelde, in a friendly between Brann and Stryn, Tenden signed with Brann in July 2004 for a short-term contract that lasted out the season. He made his debut for Brann in the Norwegian Football Cup quarter final against Bryne at Brann Stadion on 15 August, where he got one minute as a substitute for Robbie Winters. He also got four minutes in the Norwegian Premier League in a game against Bodø/Glimt 19 September 2004. Because of an ankle injury he did not get any more time on the pitch for SK Brann, but because Brann went on to win the 2004 Norwegian Football Cup, Tenden became Norwegian champion in football, after playing one minute of football.

Because of injuries Tenden was not offered a new contract with Brann, and transferred to Sogndal together with his teammate Tommy Knarvik, cancelling his initial plans to return to Loen IL. Tenden made six appearances and scored two goals in the First Division for Sogndal in his only season at the club.

He is the younger brother of footballer Asbjørn Tenden.

== Honours ==
- Norwegian Cup: 2004
