= Ulrik Flo =

Norwegian footballer (born 1988)

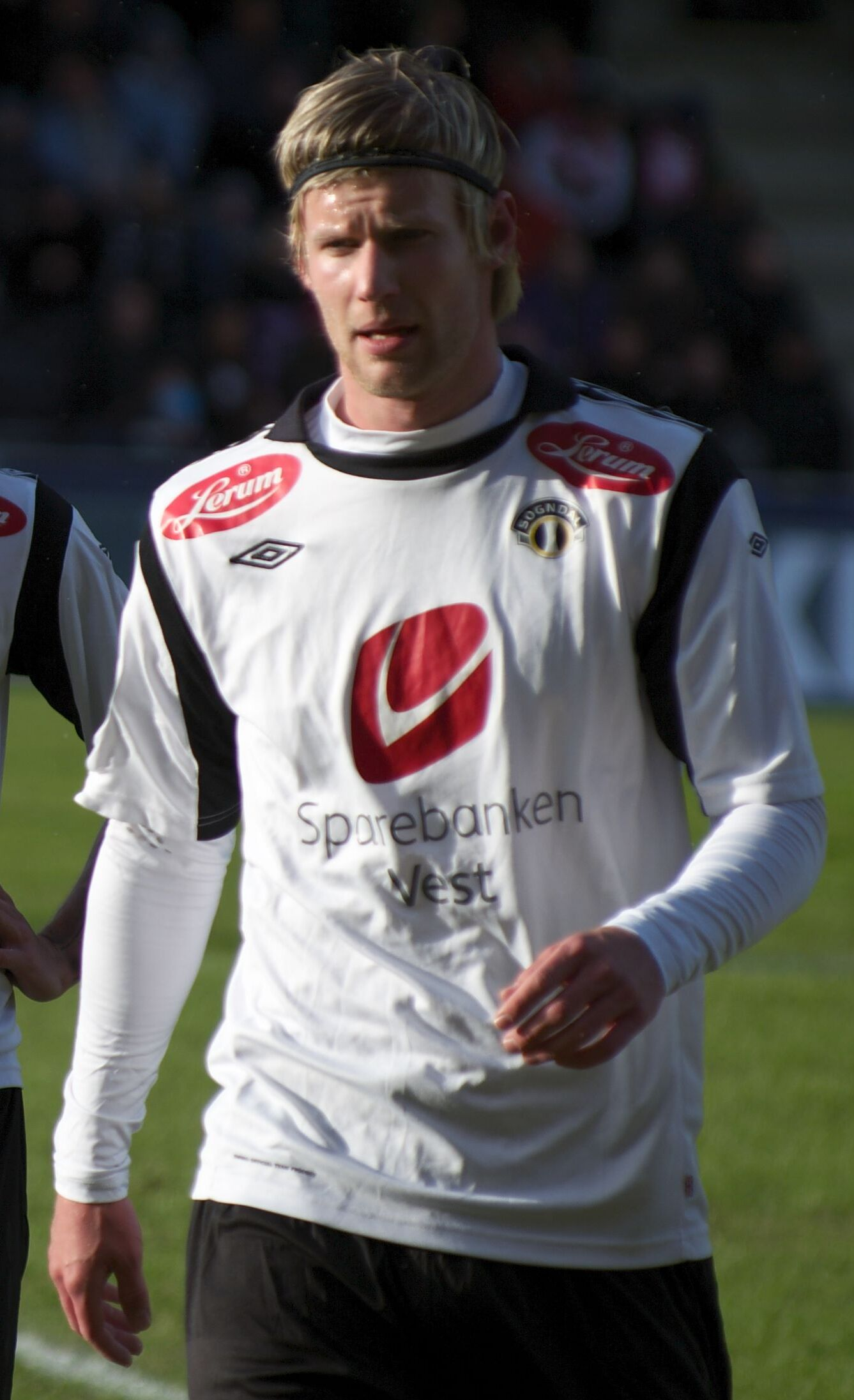
- Flo in 2012

Personal information
- Date of birth: 6 October 1988 (age 38)
- Place of birth: Stryn, Norway
- Height: 1.86 m (6 ft 1 in)
- Position: Forward

Team information
- Current team: Fjøra

Youth career
- Stryn

Senior career*
Years	Team	Apps	(Gls)
–2006	Stryn		
2007–2015	Sogndal	177	(31)
2015–2016	Odd	3	(0)
2016	Silkeborg IF	16	(1)
2016–2018	Fredrikstad	39	(14)
2018–2019	Sogndal	38	(5)
2021–	Fjøra	39	(27)

International career
2006	Norway U18	1	(0)
- * Club domestic league appearances and goals as of 26 April 2025

Ulrik Flo (born 6 October 1988) is a Norwegian former professional footballer who played as a forward.

He is the nephew of Jostein Flo and Tore Andre Flo.

== Club career ==
Flo signed for Sogndal in 2007, moving from his youth club Stryn after taking advice from his uncle Jostein. He made his debut in Tippeligaen on 20 March 2011 in Sogndal's match against Strømsgodset.

== Personal life ==
Ulrik Flo is a part of the Flo family, he is the son of the former Molde player Kjell Rune Flo, who is the brother of former international footballers Jostein Flo and Tore Andre Flo. When he made his debut in Tippeligaen, he became the seventh person from his extended family to play in the first tier in Norway.

== Career statistics ==
=== Club ===
As of match played 2 November 2019

Appearances and goals by club, season and competition
Club	Season	League			National Cup		Europe		Total	
Club	Season	Division	Apps	Goals	Apps	Goals	Apps	Goals	Apps	Goals
Sogndal	2007	1. divisjon	2	0	0	0	-		2	0
Sogndal	2008	1. divisjon	0	0	0	0	-		0	0
Sogndal	2009	1. divisjon	28	5	2	0	-		30	5
Sogndal	2010	1. divisjon	21	5	3	1	-		24	6
Sogndal	2011	Eliteserien	29	1	3	1	-		32	2
Sogndal	2012	Eliteserien	27	10	1	0	-		28	10
Sogndal	2013	Eliteserien	29	2	3	3	-		32	5
Sogndal	2014	Eliteserien	26	7	1	0	-		27	7
Sogndal	2015	1. divisjon	15	1	2	1	-		17	2
Sogndal	Total		177	31	15	6	-	-	192	37
Odd	2015	Eliteserien	3	0	0	0	2	0	5	0
Odd	Total		3	0	0	0	2	0	5	0
Silkeborg	2015–16	Danish 1st Division	13	1	0	0	-		13	1
Silkeborg	2016–17	Danish Superliga	3	0	0	0	-		3	0
Silkeborg	Total		16	1	0	0	-	-	16	1
Fredrikstad	2016	1. divisjon	10	6	0	0	-		10	6
Fredrikstad	2017	1. divisjon	29	8	1	0	-		30	8
Fredrikstad	Total		39	14	1	0	-	-	40	14
Sogndal	2018	1. divisjon	19	1	2	2	-		21	3
Sogndal	2019	1. divisjon	19	4	3	1	-		22	5
Sogndal	Total		38	5	5	3	-	-	43	8
Career total			273	51	21	9	2	0	296	60
