= Stendy Appeltoft =

Swedish footballer (1920–1992)

Personal information
- Date of birth: 27 November 1920
- Place of birth: Sweden
- Date of death: 28 November 1992 (aged 72)
- Position: Defender

Youth career
- Högaborgs BK

Senior career*
Years	Team	Apps	(Gls)
- Högaborgs BK
1949–1956	Helsingborgs IF		

International career
1955	Sweden B	1	(0)
1955	Sweden	1	(0)
- * Club domestic league appearances and goals

Stendy Appeltoft (27 November 1920 – 28 November 1992) was a Swedish footballer who played as a defender. He won one cap for the Sweden national team in 1955.

== Club career ==
Appeltoft played his club football for Högaborgs BK and Helsingborgs IF and appeared in a total of 382 games for Helsingborg.

== International career ==
Appeltoft made his only appearance for the Sweden national team on 28 August 1955 when he replaced Bengt Gustavsson in the 19th minute in a friendly game against Finland. At 34 years, 9 months and 1 day, he is the oldest debutante to ever appear for the Sweden national team. He also appeared once for the Sweden B team.

== Career statistics ==
=== International ===
Appearances and goals by national team and year
National team	Year	Apps	Goals
Sweden	1955	1	0
Total		1	0

== Honours ==
Records

- Oldest debutante for the Sweden national team: 34 years, 9 months and 1 day (3–0 against Finland on 28 August 1955)
