= Stryn TIL =

Norwegian sports club

- Full name: Stryn Turn- og Idrettslag
- Founded: 30 December 1898
- Ground: Stryn krøllgras, Stryn Municipality
- League: 3. divisjon
Home colours

Stryn Turn- og Idrettslag is a Norwegian multi-sports club from Stryn Municipality, Vestland. It has sections for association football, team handball, basketball, track and field, Nordic skiing, alpine skiing, gymnastics, and cycling. The club was founded on 30 December 1898.

The men's football team currently plays in the 3. divisjon, the fourth tier of Norwegian football, where it has played since 1999. Before that they had a stint in the 2. divisjon from 1996 to 1998. While playing on the fourth tier, the team contested a Playoff to the 2. Divisjon in 2005, but lost to Hamarkameratene 2 on aggregate; and 2006 when it lost to FF Lillehammer on aggregate.

The club is well known as the youth club of the Flo football family; Håvard, Jarle, Jostein, Tore André, Per Egil and Ulrik. Other professional footballers from Stryn include Steinar Tenden and Mats Solheim. Harald Aabrekk coached the men's team from 1987 to 1989.
