= 2013 Emirates Cup =

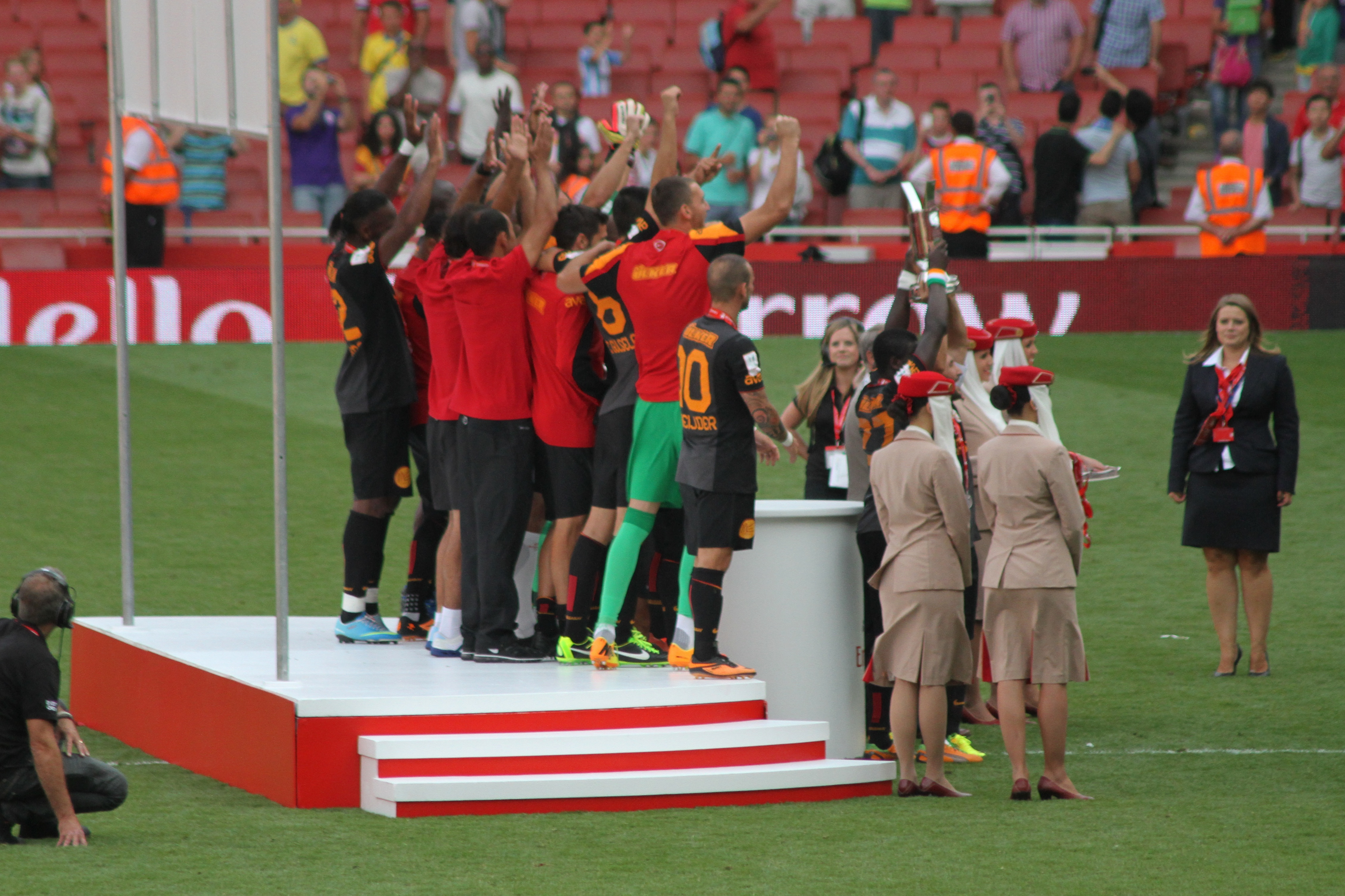

Tournament details
- Host country: England
- City: London
- Dates: 3 – 4 August
- Teams: 4 (from 1 confederation)
- Venue: 1 (in 1 host city)

Final positions
- Champions: Galatasaray (1st title)
- Runners-up: Porto
- Third place: Arsenal
- Fourth place: Napoli

Tournament statistics
- Matches played: 4
- Goals scored: 12 (3 per match)
- Top scorer(s): Didier Drogba; Goran Pandev (2 goals each)

The 2013 Emirates Cup was a pre-season football friendly tournament hosted by Arsenal at its home ground, the Emirates Stadium in London. It was the sixth Emirates Cup, an invitational competition inaugurated in 2007. Held on the weekend of 3–4 August 2013, the participants were Arsenal, Porto, Napoli, and Galatasaray. The 2013 edition marked the resumption of the Emirates Cup as the tournament took a hiatus in 2012 due to the Summer Olympics.

The competition followed a point scoring system much like the Amsterdam Tournament, whereby each team played two matches, with three points awarded for a win, one point for a draw and none for a loss. It also reverted to system whereby each goal was awarded with a point. Arsenal did not face Porto, and Napoli did not play against Galatasaray.

The first day saw Galatasaray defeat Porto by a single goal, while Arsenal came from two goals down to draw against Napoli. Didier Drogba scored twice for Galatasaray against Arsenal to ensure the Turkish club won the tournament. Porto beat Napoli 3–1 to finish second, on six points.

== Background ==
In March 2007 Arsenal announced their intention to stage a pre-season competition at their home ground, the Emirates Stadium. Managing director Keith Edelman revealed plans were at an exploratory stage, and added: "It would be in pre-season, around late July, and tickets would be reasonably priced. We feel it could be a really exciting event." The tournament went ahead four months later and is named after Arsenal's main sponsor Emirates.

After a break in 2012 due to the Summer Olympics, Arsenal confirmed the return of the Emirates Cup in May 2013. Süper Lig champions Galatasaray, Italian side Napoli and Portuguese club Porto were revealed as participants for the 2013 edition, alongside hosts Arsenal. Arsenal chief executive Ivan Gazidis said in a statement, "We are welcoming three high-quality sides to this year’s competition again and I’m sure we’ll see some great football played over the two days."

== Summary ==
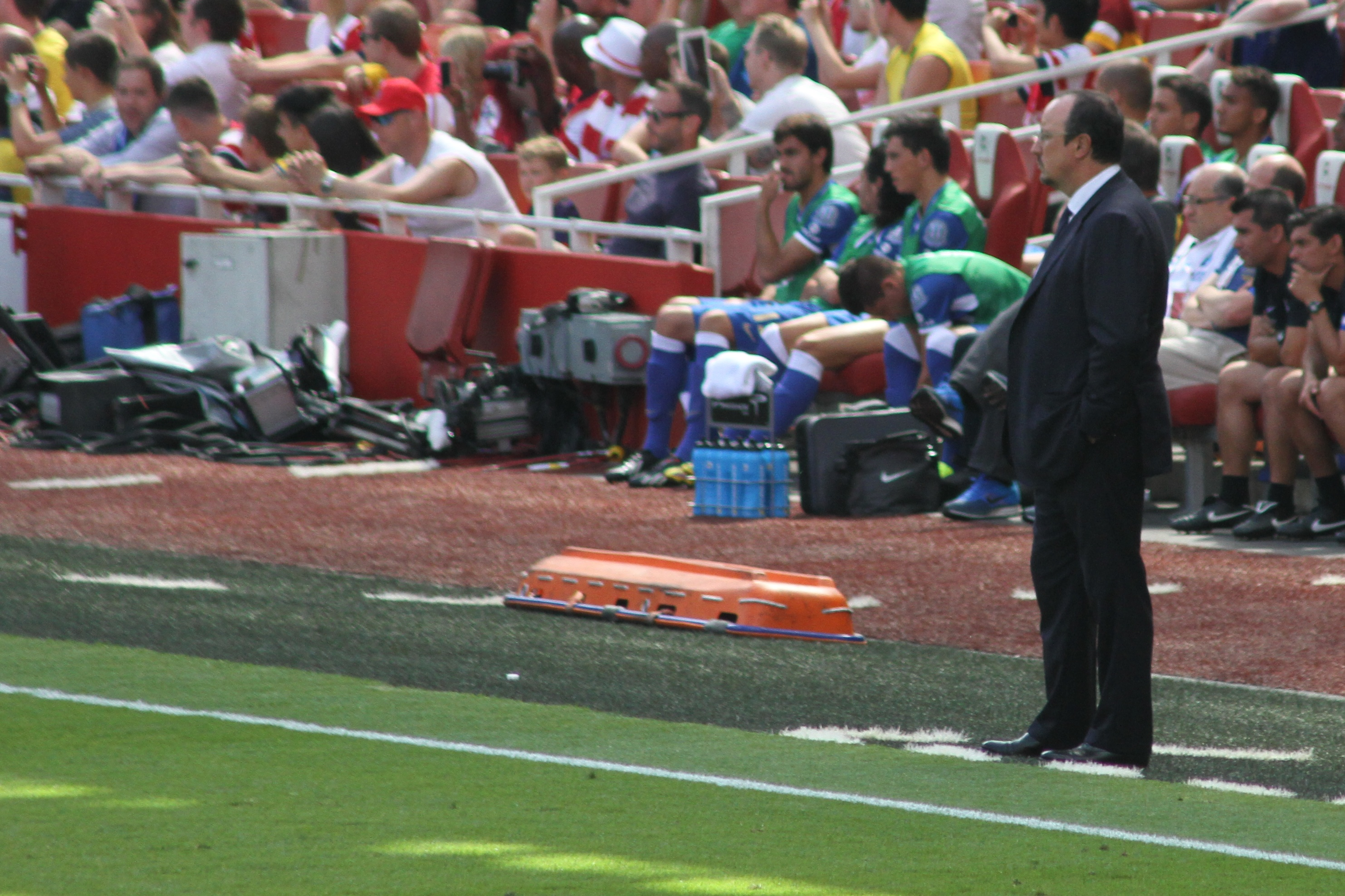
Napoli manager Rafael Benítez standing on the touchline

Porto faced Galatasaray on the first day of the tournament. The only goal of the game was scored by Galatasaray's Felipe Melo, who converted a penalty in the second half. Porto began sprightly, but struggled to make their possession count. They were awarded a penalty in the 19th minute but Jackson Martínez saw his effort saved by goalkeeper Fernando Muslera. As the match went on Galatasaray started to dominate; Didier Drogba and Wesley Sneijder linked up well and provided the team's biggest threat up front. After taking the lead via a penalty won by former Arsenal defender Emmanuel Eboué, Galatasaray once more conceded a penalty. Up stepped Porto's captain Lucho González, but he hit his penalty wide. The score ended 1–0 in Galatasaray's favour; the club's manager Fatih Terim said afterwards: “Our play wasn't very satisfactory but in the second half we pressed more and we performed better.”

Arsenal played Napoli in the day's late game. In the match, the hosts came back from two goals down in the space of 14 minutes to draw 2–2. Napoli were sharp in the first half, leading through Lorenzo Insigne's goal and doubled their advantage after Pandev went around goalkeeper Łukasz Fabiański to score. Arsenal's poor performance resulted in the home support booing the team off at half time. Arsenal played with purpose thereafter, and got back into the game when Olivier Giroud's overhead kick found its way into the Napoli goal. Laurent Koscielny equalised for Arsenal with four minutes of normal time remaining. In an assessment of Arsenal's performance, The Observer's match reporter Simon Burton noted the hosts "worked the ball nicely through midfield but ran out of ideas at the edge of the penalty area."

Napoli took on Porto on the second day of the Emirates Cup. The Italian club led towards the end of the first half as Goran Pandev scored from the penalty spot. Porto responded after the break with three goals; the first came in the 50th minute when Nabil Ghilas' strike beat Pepe Reina in goal. Napoli's Federico Fernández scored an own goal and substitute Licá sealed a 3–1 win for the Portuguese side after Andrea Dossena made an error in his penalty box. The final game of the tournament was Arsenal versus Galatasaray. It was the first meeting between the two clubs since the 2000 UEFA Cup Final which Galatasaray won on penalties. Yaya Sanogo played up front for Arsenal, while Drogba started on the bench for Galatasaray. Theo Walcott, who missed a chance in the 18th minute, gave Arsenal the lead five minutes before the break. A tangle between Drogba and Ignasi Miquel in the Arsenal penalty box resulted in the referee awarding Galatasaray a penalty in the 78th minute. Arsenal manager Arsène Wenger described the penalty as a "classic Drogba," and the player duly converted his spot kick. Drogba scored his second of the match late on to win the Emirates Cup for Galatasaray; he controlled a long ball from Sneijder, before cutting inside and shooting past Wojciech Szczęsny. It was Drogba's 15th goal against Arsenal in 15 matches.

== Standings ==
Each team played two matches, with three points awarded for a win, one point for a draw, and a point for every goal scored. In addition, shots on target were taken into account and were used to decide the tournament winners if teams were level on points and goal difference.

Pos	Team	Pld	W	D	L	GF	GA	GD	Pts
1	Galatasaray	2	2	0	0	3	1	+2	9
2	Porto	2	1	0	1	3	2	+1	6
3	Arsenal	2	0	1	1	3	4	−1	4
4	Napoli	2	0	1	1	3	5	−2	4

== Matches ==
3 August 2013
14:00 BST

Galatasaray	1–0	Porto
Felipe Melo 71' (pen.)	Report

Emirates Stadium, London
Attendance: 59,554
Referee: Andre Marriner

3 August 2013
16:20 BST

Arsenal	2–2	Napoli
Giroud 72'; Koscielny 86'	Report	Insigne 7'; Pandev 28'

Emirates Stadium, London
Attendance: 59,554
Referee: Kevin Friend

4 August 2013
14:00 BST

Napoli	1–3	Porto
Pandev 45' (pen.)	Report	Ghilas 50'; Fernández 68' (o.g.); Licá 78'

Emirates Stadium, London
Attendance: 59,608
Referee: Anthony Taylor

4 August 2013
16:20 BST

Arsenal	1–2	Galatasaray
Walcott 40'	Report	Drogba 78' (pen.), 87'

Emirates Stadium, London
Attendance: 59,608
Referee: Jonathan Moss

== Goalscorers ==
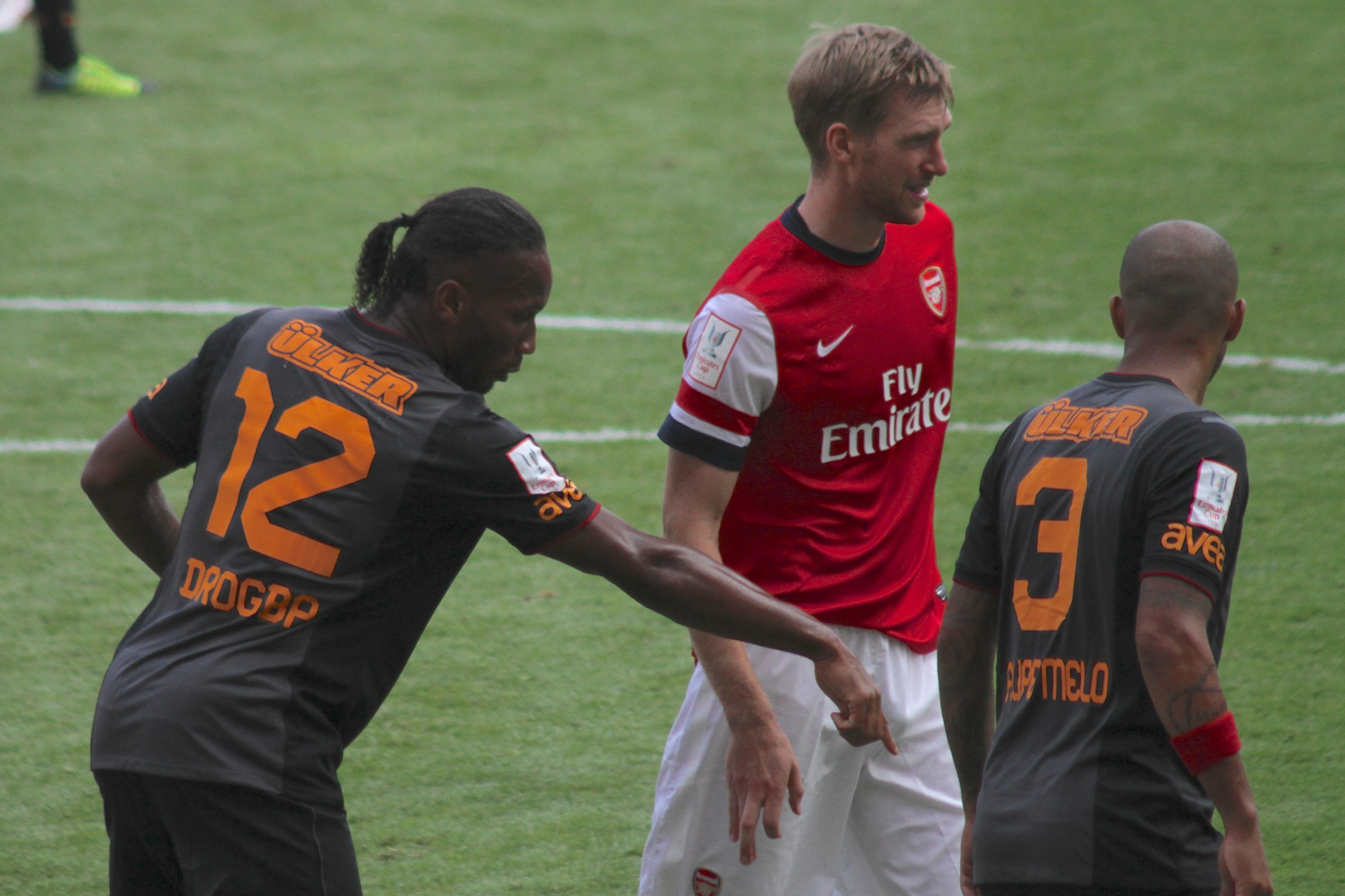
Didier Drogba (left) scored two goals in the tournament

Rank	Name	Team	Goals
1	(Ivory Coast) Didier Drogba	Galatasaray	2
1	(North Macedonia) Goran Pandev	Napoli	2
3	(France) Olivier Giroud	Arsenal	1
3	(France) Laurent Koscielny	Arsenal	1
3	(England) Theo Walcott	Arsenal	1
3	(Brazil) Felipe Melo	Galatasaray	1
3	(Italy) Lorenzo Insigne	Napoli	1
3	(Algeria) Nabil Ghilas	Porto	1
3	(Portugal) Licá	Porto	1
Own goal	(Argentina) Federico Fernández	Napoli	1
