= Emirates Cup =

Association football competition

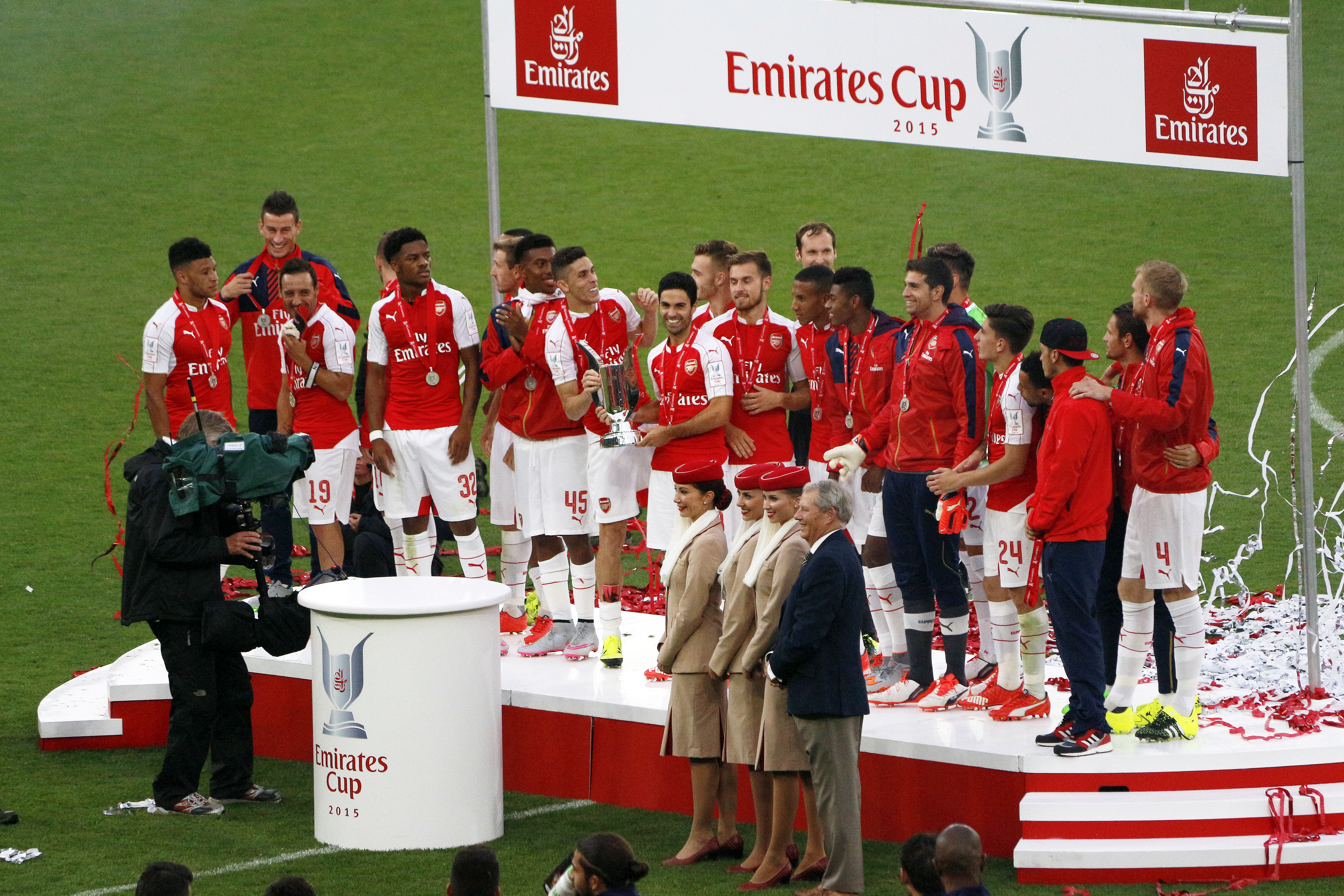
- Arsenal celebrate with the trophy after winning the 2015 Emirates Cup.
- Founded: 2007; 19 years ago
- Teams: 2
- Current champions: (Germany) Borussia Dortmund (1st title)
- Most championships: (England) Arsenal (9 titles)
- Website: Official website

The Emirates Cup is a pre-season association football competition hosted by English club Arsenal at their home ground, the Emirates Stadium in Holloway, London. Created in 2007 and named after the club's principal shirt sponsor, Emirates, the tournament consists of exhibition games with invited clubs held in the summer. It is not sanctioned as a competitive event and carries no official recognition. The competition was not staged in 2012 due to the London Olympics, in 2016 and 2018 due to stadium maintenance, and in 2020 and 2021 because of the COVID-19 pandemic.

The tournament format, though occasionally revised, has always prioritised entertainment and brand exposure for Emirates over competitive football. In its early editions, teams earned three points for a win, one for a draw, and none for a loss, with an extra point awarded for each goal scored. This was dropped in 2011 but reinstated in 2013. If teams finished level on points, total shots on target were used as a further tiebreaker. Since 2019, the event has been shortened to a single-day format.

Arsenal, as the organisers and perennial hosts, have won the most titles, winning the competition nine times. Other one-time winners include Hamburger SV (2008), New York Red Bulls (2011), Galatasaray (2013), Valencia (2014), Lyon (2019) and Borussia Dortmund (2026). Lyon have appeared more often than any other visiting side, with four invitations. Borussia Dortmund are the current holders, having defeated Arsenal 3–2 in the 2026 edition.

== History ==
Arsenal first announced their intention to stage a pre-season competition at their home ground, the Emirates Stadium, in March 2007. Managing director Keith Edelman revealed plans were at an exploratory stage, and added: "It would be in pre-season, around late July, and tickets would be reasonably priced. We feel it could be a really exciting event." Details of the tournament were formally announced on 1 May 2007, with Italian champions Inter Milan, French side Paris Saint-Germain and German outfit Hamburg confirmed as participants. Hamburg's qualification into the UEFA Intertoto Cup meant they withdrew from the competition; the club was replaced by Spain's Valencia.

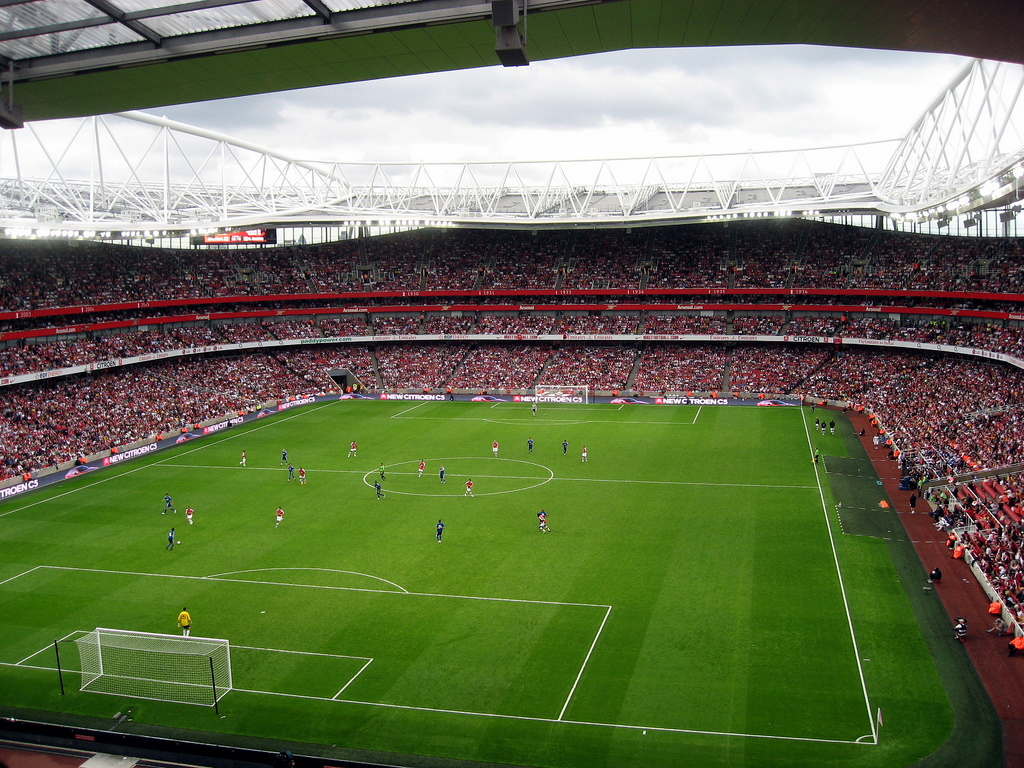
A wide shot of the Emirates Stadium, where Arsenal faced Real Madrid in 2008.

The inaugural Emirates Cup took place on 28 July and 29 July 2007 and was well attended, with over 110,000 people filling the stadium across the two-day tournament. Each club played two sides; Valencia and Arsenal did not face each other, and Inter did not play against Paris Saint-Germain. Arsenal won the first tournament, having beaten their French opponents 2–1 and defeated Inter by the same scoreline, courtesy of a late strike by Robin van Persie . The following year Hamburg made an appearance alongside Real Madrid and Juventus, and won the tournament as they finished two points clear of second-place Real.

In 2009, Arsenal welcomed Atlético Madrid, Rangers, and Paris Saint-Germain to the Emirates Cup. The hosts regained the trophy winning both of their matches and scoring five goals; midfielder Jack Wilshere was twice named man of the match for his performances against Atlético Madrid and Rangers. Arsenal retained the Emirates Cup in 2010, but failed to top the table in the next three tournaments. New York Red Bulls, who were captained by former Arsenal striker Thierry Henry, won the Emirates Cup in 2011, after beating Paris Saint-Germain and drawing with the hosts. The tournament did not take place in 2012 due to the ongoing Summer Olympics in London; it was believed that the capital's infrastructure was not able to cater for the extra 100,000 supporters that usually attend the two-day event. When the Emirates Cup resumed in 2013, Turkish side Galatasaray earned nine points to finish top of the group, and a year later Valencia became the first Spanish winners of the tournament as the hosts lost their decisive game against Monaco.

Arsenal claimed their fourth Emirates Cup in 2015; the competition was held on the final weekend of July. The hosts scored seven goals in the tournament – six against Lyon, who later became the first team in the competition's history not to score a goal in either of their matches. Due to the extended schedule of UEFA Euro 2016 and essential pitch reconstruction works at the Emirates Stadium, the Emirates Cup did not take place in the pre-season period of the 2016–17 season. Two years later, stadium building work meant that once again the tournament did not take place; Arsenal instead played pre-season matches in the International Champions Cup.

The competition returned in 2019 with Arsenal Women featuring for the first time in the pre-season tournament, where they faced Bayern Munich. In the men's tournament, Lyon defeated Arsenal 2–1 to win their first title. The 2020 and 2021 editions were cancelled due to the COVID-19 pandemic.

== Tournaments ==
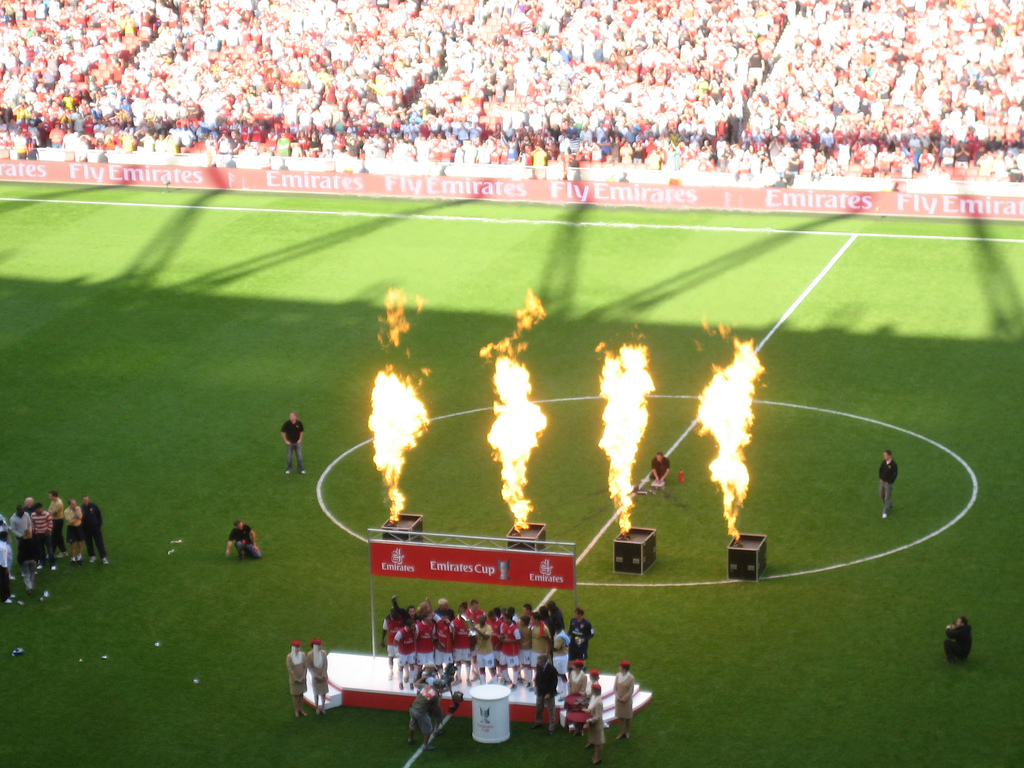
Arsenal won the inaugural Emirates Cup held in 2007.

Emirates Cup – men's tournament results
Ed.	Year	Winner	Runner-up	Third	Fourth	Ref.
1	2007	(England) Arsenal	(France) Paris Saint-Germain	(Spain) Valencia	(Italy) Inter Milan	
2	2008	(Germany) Hamburger SV	(Spain) Real Madrid	(England) Arsenal	(Italy) Juventus	
3	2009	(England) Arsenal (2)	(Scotland) Rangers	(Spain) Atlético Madrid	(France) Paris Saint-Germain	
4	2010	(England) Arsenal (3)	(France) Lyon	(Scotland) Celtic	(Italy) Milan	
5	2011	(United States) New York Red Bulls	(France) Paris Saint-Germain	(England) Arsenal	(Argentina) Boca Juniors	
6	2013	(Turkey) Galatasaray	(Portugal) Porto	(England) Arsenal	(Italy) Napoli	
7	2014	(Spain) Valencia	(England) Arsenal	(France) Monaco	(Portugal) Benfica	
8	2015	(England) Arsenal (4)	(Spain) Villarreal	(Germany) VfL Wolfsburg	(France) Lyon	
9	2017	(England) Arsenal (5)	(Spain) Sevilla	(Germany) RB Leipzig	(Portugal) Benfica	
10	2019	(France) Lyon	(England) Arsenal	—N/a		
11	2022	(England) Arsenal (6)	(Spain) Sevilla	—N/a		
12	2023	(England) Arsenal (7)	(France) Monaco	—N/a		
13	2024	(England) Arsenal (8)	(France) Lyon	—N/a		
14	2025	(England) Arsenal (9)	(Spain) Athletic Bilbao	—N/a		
15	2026	(Germany) Borussia Dortmund	(England) Arsenal	—N/a		

Emirates Cup – women's tournament results
Ed.	Year	Winner	Score	Runner-up	Ref.
1	2019	(Germany) Bayern Munich	1–0	(England) Arsenal	

== Performance by team ==
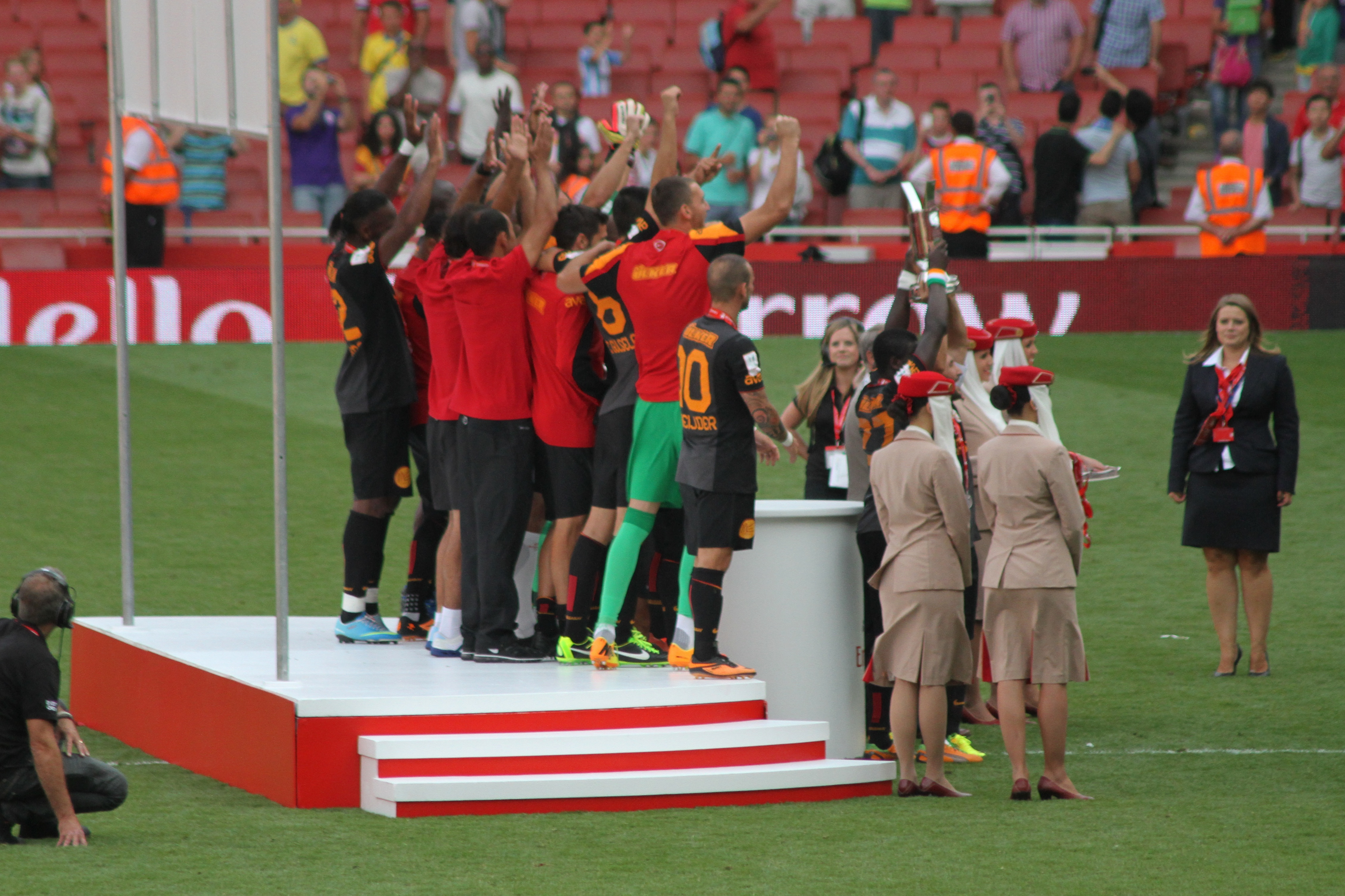
Galatasaray was the first Turkish club to win the Emirates Cup.

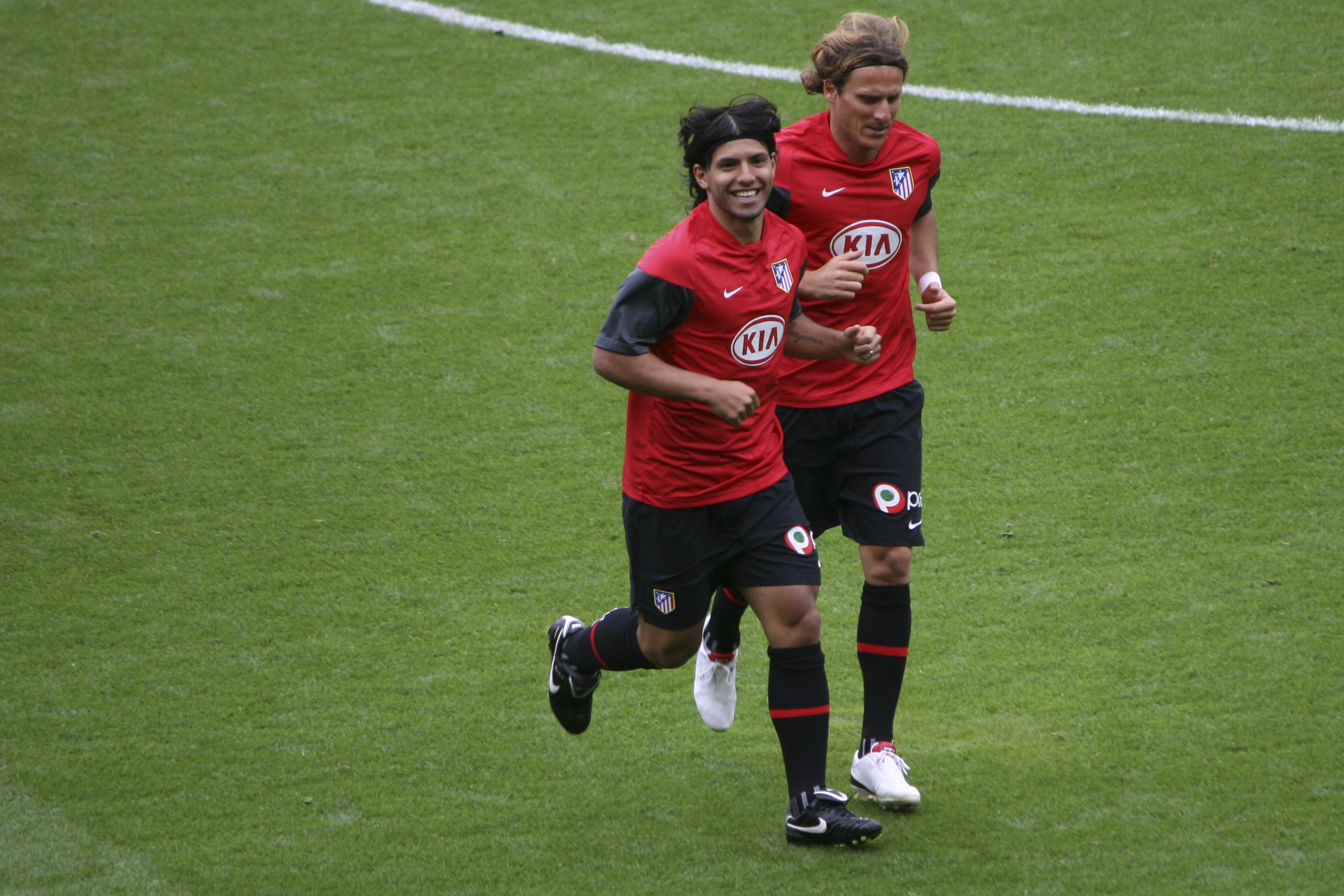
Sergio Agüero and Diego Forlán featured in the 2009 edition of the Emirates Cup for Atlético Madrid.

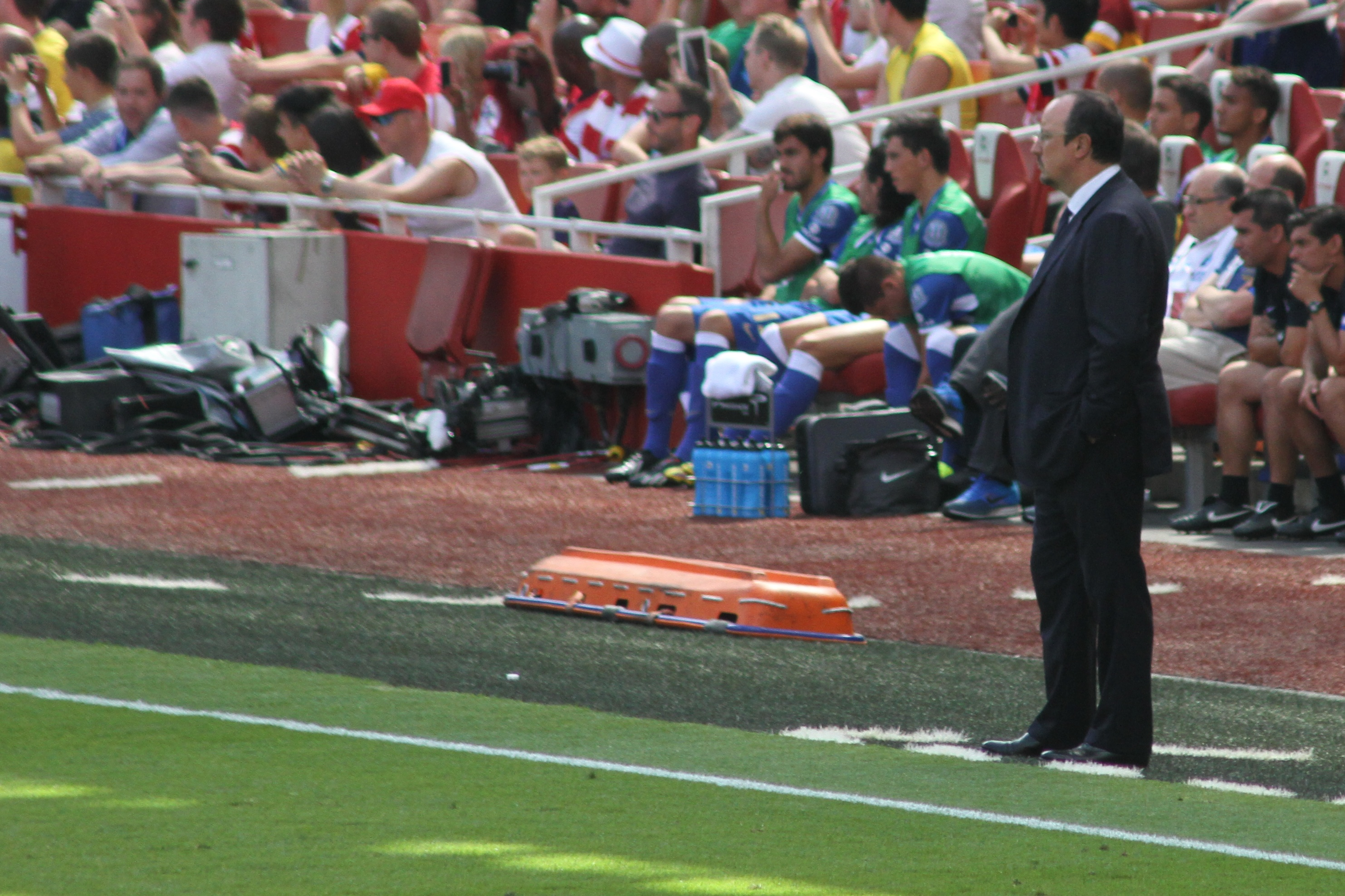
Rafael Benítez managed Napoli in the tournament.

=== Men's ===
Men's Emirates Cup statistics
Team	Winner	Runner-up	Third	Fourth	Total
(England) Arsenal	9	3	3	—	15
(France) Lyon	1	2	—	1	4
(Spain) Valencia	1	—	1	—	2
(Germany) Borussia Dortmund	1	—	—	—	1
(Turkey) Galatasaray	1	—	—	—	1
(Germany) Hamburger SV	1	—	—	—	1
(United States) New York Red Bulls	1	—	—	—	1
(France) Paris Saint-Germain	—	2	—	1	3
(Spain) Sevilla	—	2	—	—	2
(France) Monaco	—	1	1	—	2
(Spain) Athletic Bilbao	—	1	—	—	1
(Portugal) Porto	—	1	—	—	1
(Scotland) Rangers	—	1	—	—	1
(Spain) Real Madrid	—	1	—	—	1
(Spain) Villarreal	—	1	—	—	1
(Spain) Atlético Madrid	—	—	1	—	1
(Scotland) Celtic	—	—	1	—	1
(Germany) RB Leipzig	—	—	1	—	1
(Germany) VfL Wolfsburg	—	—	1	—	1
(Portugal) Benfica	—	—	—	2	2
(Argentina) Boca Juniors	—	—	—	1	1
(Italy) Internazionale	—	—	—	1	1
(Italy) Juventus	—	—	—	1	1
(Italy) Milan	—	—	—	1	1
(Italy) Napoli	—	—	—	1	1

=== Women's ===
Women's Emirates Cup statistics
Team	Winner	Runner-up	Total
(Germany) Bayern Munich	1	—	1
(England) Arsenal	—	1	1

== See also ==
- Pre-season friendly / invitational tournaments
- Amsterdam Tournament
- Wembley Cup
