= 2015 Emirates Cup =

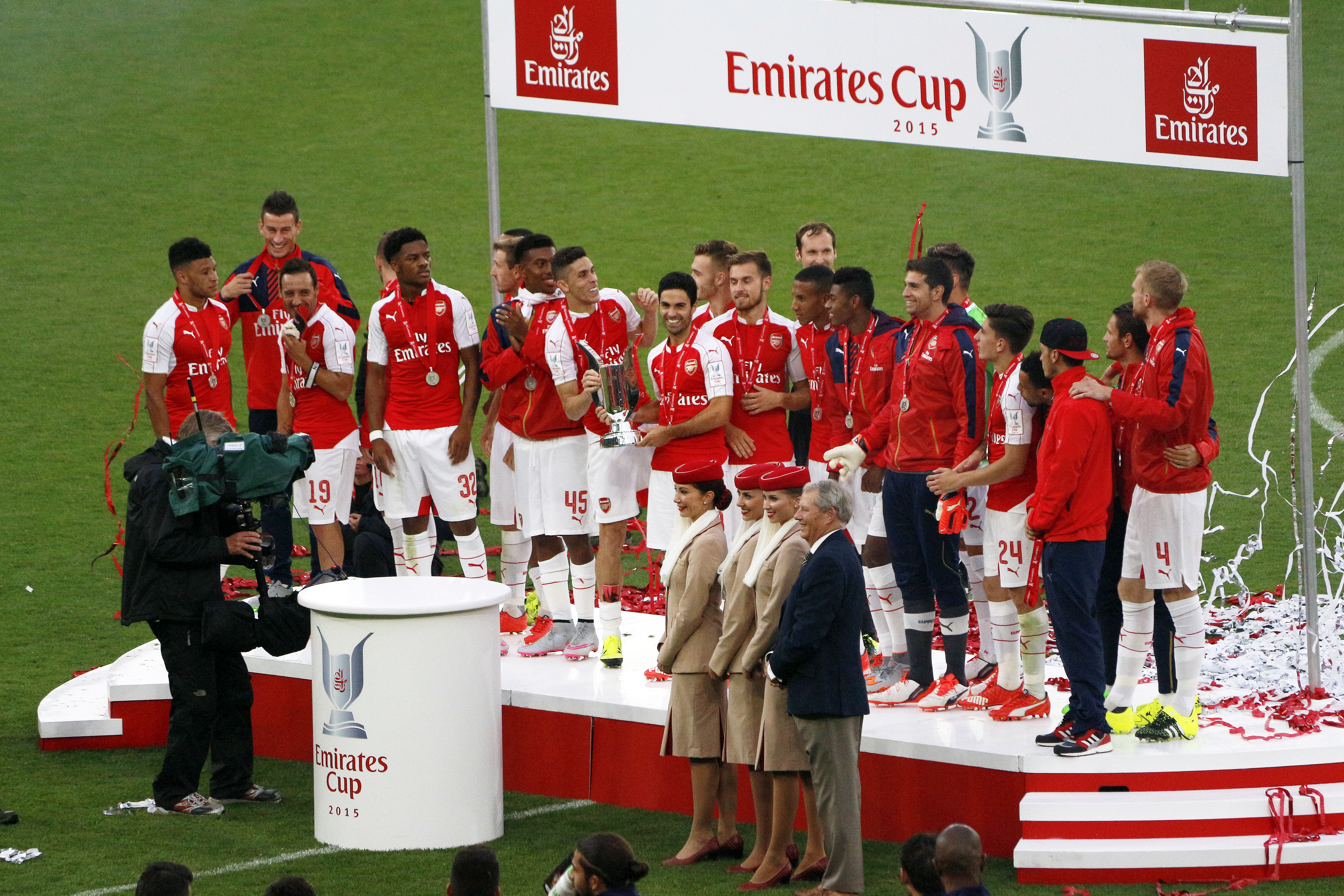
- Arsenal celebrate with the trophy after winning the two-day tournament

Tournament details
- Host country: England
- City: London
- Dates: 25 – 26 July
- Teams: 4 (from 1 confederation)
- Venue: 1 (in 1 host city)

Final positions
- Champions: Arsenal (4th title)
- Runners-up: Villarreal
- Third place: Wolfsburg
- Fourth place: Lyon

Tournament statistics
- Matches played: 4
- Goals scored: 12 (3 per match)
- Top scorer: 12 players (1 goal)

The 2015 Emirates Cup was a pre-season football friendly tournament hosted by Arsenal at its home ground, the Emirates Stadium in London. It was the eighth Emirates Cup, an invitational competition inaugurated in 2007. Held on the weekend of 25–26 July 2015, the participants were Arsenal, Villarreal, Olympique Lyonnais, and Wolfsburg.

Each team played two matches, with three points awarded for a win, one point for a draw and none for a loss. An additional point was awarded for every goal scored. Arsenal did not face Villarreal, and Lyon did not play against Wolfsburg. Arsenal claimed their fourth Emirates Cup and first in five years by beating Lyon 6–0 on the first day and then Wolfsburg the day after by a single goal. Villarreal finished as runners-up winning both of their matches, while Wolfsburg and Lyon ended the tournament with no wins. Wolfsburg, which scored one goal in the tournament, placed third, and Lyon, which scored none, placed last.

== Background ==
The Emirates Cup began in July 2007 once Arsenal finalised plans to stage a pre-season competition at its home ground. Named after Arsenal's main sponsor Emirates, the competition's inaugural edition was attended by over 110,000 people across the two days.

In May 2015, Bundesliga club Wolfsburg, Villarreal of La Liga and Ligue 1 outfit Olympique Lyonnais (Lyon) were confirmed as participants, alongside hosts Arsenal, for the eighth edition of the Emirates Cup. It marked Lyon's second appearance in the tournament; they also participated in 2010. Arsenal chief executive Ivan Gazidis said of the three other clubs in a statement, "Lyon, Villarreal and Wolfsburg have some fantastic players and will all contribute to an entertaining weekend of football for our supporters."

== Summary ==
Villarreal took on Wolfsburg on the opening day of the 2015 Emirates Cup. Wolfsburg's squad included former Arsenal player Nicklas Bendtner, while Manchester City-bound midfielder Kevin De Bruyne started for the German side. The match got off to a lively start with two goals scored in the opening 15 minutes. Villarreal took the lead through Mario in the 8th minute when the team drove forward and he placed his shot into the top left-hand corner of the goal. Almost immediately, Ivan Perišić levelled the score with a left-footed shot. The winner came in the 16th minute; Gerard Moreno's headed pass found Matías Nahuel in the penalty box, and the Villarreal forward's hard shot found its way into the net. The second half was a subdued affair despite several clear chances to score – according to FourFourTwo, "Bendtner's return to the Emirates was the main highlight for the home crowd," when the striker came on for Max Kruse in the 60th minute.

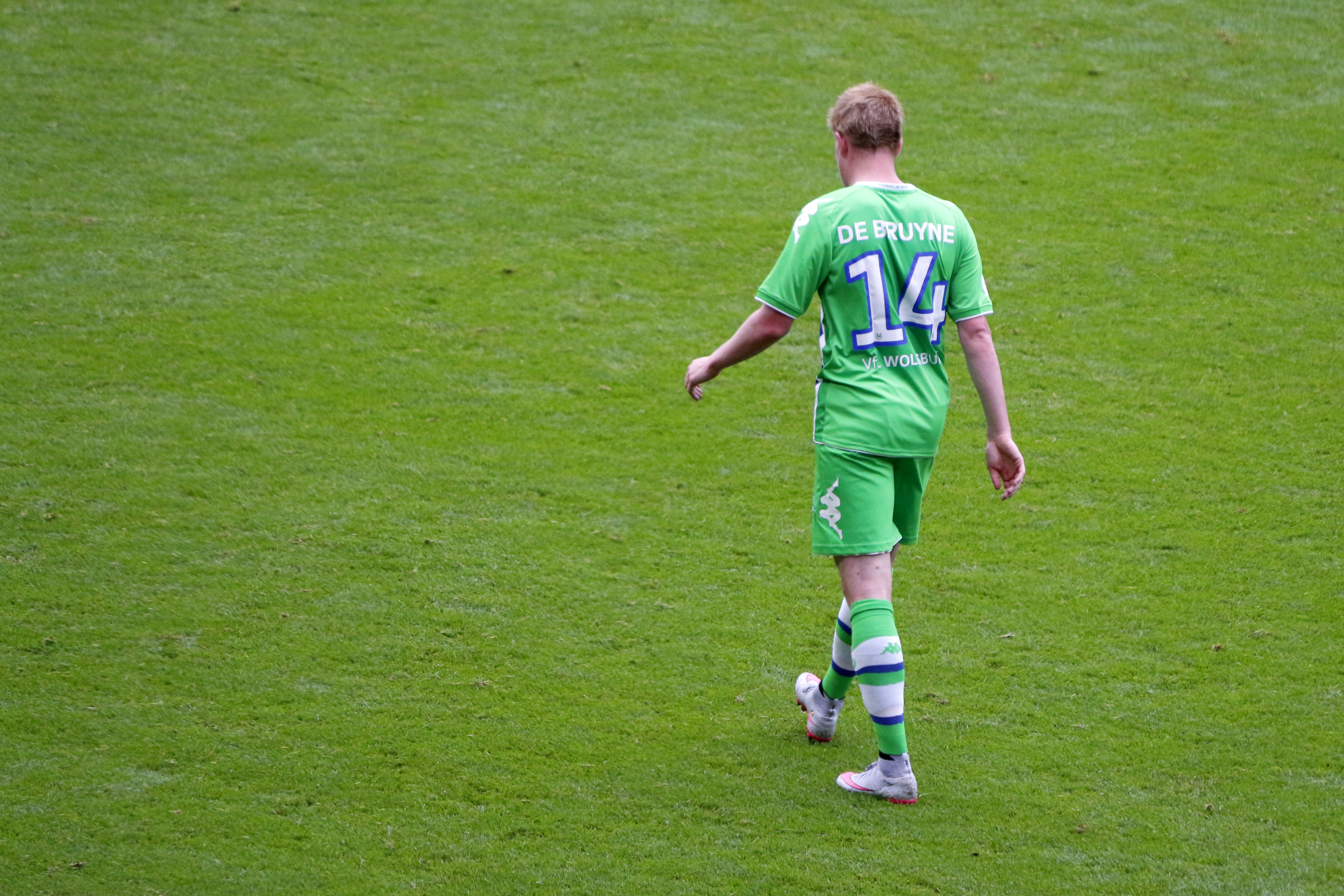
Kevin de Bruyne in action for Wolfsburg against Arsenal on the second day of the tournament.

Arsenal faced Lyon in the day's late kick-off. Forward Alex Iwobi started for Arsenal, while goalkeeper Petr Čech, who left Chelsea to join the North London club, was named on the substitutes' bench. For Lyon, Alexandre Lacazette played upfront alongside Clinton N'Jie, who later left to join Tottenham Hotspur. Arsenal started well, moving the ball around in Lyon's half, and went a goal up just after the half-hour mark when Olivier Giroud headed in a free kick awarded for a foul on Mathieu Debuchy. A flurry of goals followed: Alex Oxlade-Chamberlain made it 2–0, and Iwobi and Ramsey each scored before the break, leaving it 4–0 in favour of Arsenal. Mesut Özil, who match reporter Amy Lawrence noted "was able to mix a more direct style with his penchant for assisting" added a fifth, and then substitute Santi Cazorla rounded off the 6–0 victory with a final goal in the 85th minute. Arsenal's big win delighted manager Arsène Wenger who said afterwards: "We have a good squad. We score goals. We can create chances," though he maintained the club was "open-minded" to make additions in the transfer window.

Lyon and Villarreal faced each other on the final day of the tournament. Manager Hubert Fournier made a number of changes from Lyon's defeat to Arsenal, including a start for former Tottenham and Fulham midfielder Steed Malbranque. He was involved in Lyon's first chance of the match, setting up Aldo Kalulu who had his shot saved by the Wolfsburg goalkeeper. Villarreal were awarded a penalty in the 31st minute for a foul on Javier Espinosa, which Roberto Soriano slotted in. The Spanish side doubled their lead early in the second half when Léo Baptistão chipped the ball over goalkeeper Mathieu Gorgelin. In the day's late match, Arsenal beat Wolfsburg by a single goal to regain the Emirates Cup. Theo Walcott scored the only goal of the match, assisted by winger Jeff Reine-Adelaide who Wenger described as having "something special".

Arsenal finished the two-day tournament in top place, with 13 points. Villarreal were second, Wolfsburg third and Lyon with no wins or goals scored came last with zero points. The Emirates Cup was postponed the following year due to pitch reconstruction works at Arsenal's home ground; the tournament continued in 2017.

== Standings ==
Each team played two matches, with three points awarded for a win, one point for a draw, and a point for every goal scored. In addition, shots on target were taken into account and used to decide the competition winners if teams had the same points total and goal difference tally.

Pos	Team	Pld	W	D	L	GF	GA	GD	Pts
1	Arsenal	2	2	0	0	7	0	+7	13
2	Villarreal	2	2	0	0	4	1	+3	10
3	Wolfsburg	2	0	0	2	1	3	−2	1
4	Lyon	2	0	0	2	0	8	−8	0

== Matches ==
25 July 2015
14:00 BST

Wolfsburg	1–2	Villarreal
Perišić 10'	Report	Mario 8'; Nahuel 16'

Emirates Stadium, London
Attendance: 56,690
Referee: Robert Madley

25 July 2015
16:20 BST

Arsenal	6–0	Lyon
Giroud 29'; Oxlade-Chamberlain 34'; Iwobi 35'; Ramsey 38'; Özil 62'; Cazorla 84'	Report

Emirates Stadium, London
Attendance: 56,690
Referee: Jonathan Moss

26 July 2015
14:00 BST

Lyon	0–2	Villarreal
	Report	Soriano 31' (pen.); Baptistão 54'

Emirates Stadium, London
Attendance: 59,918
Referee: Ryuji Sato

26 July 2015
16:20 BST

Arsenal	1–0	Wolfsburg
Walcott 51'	Report

Emirates Stadium, London
Attendance: 59,918
Referee: Craig Pawson

== Goalscorers ==
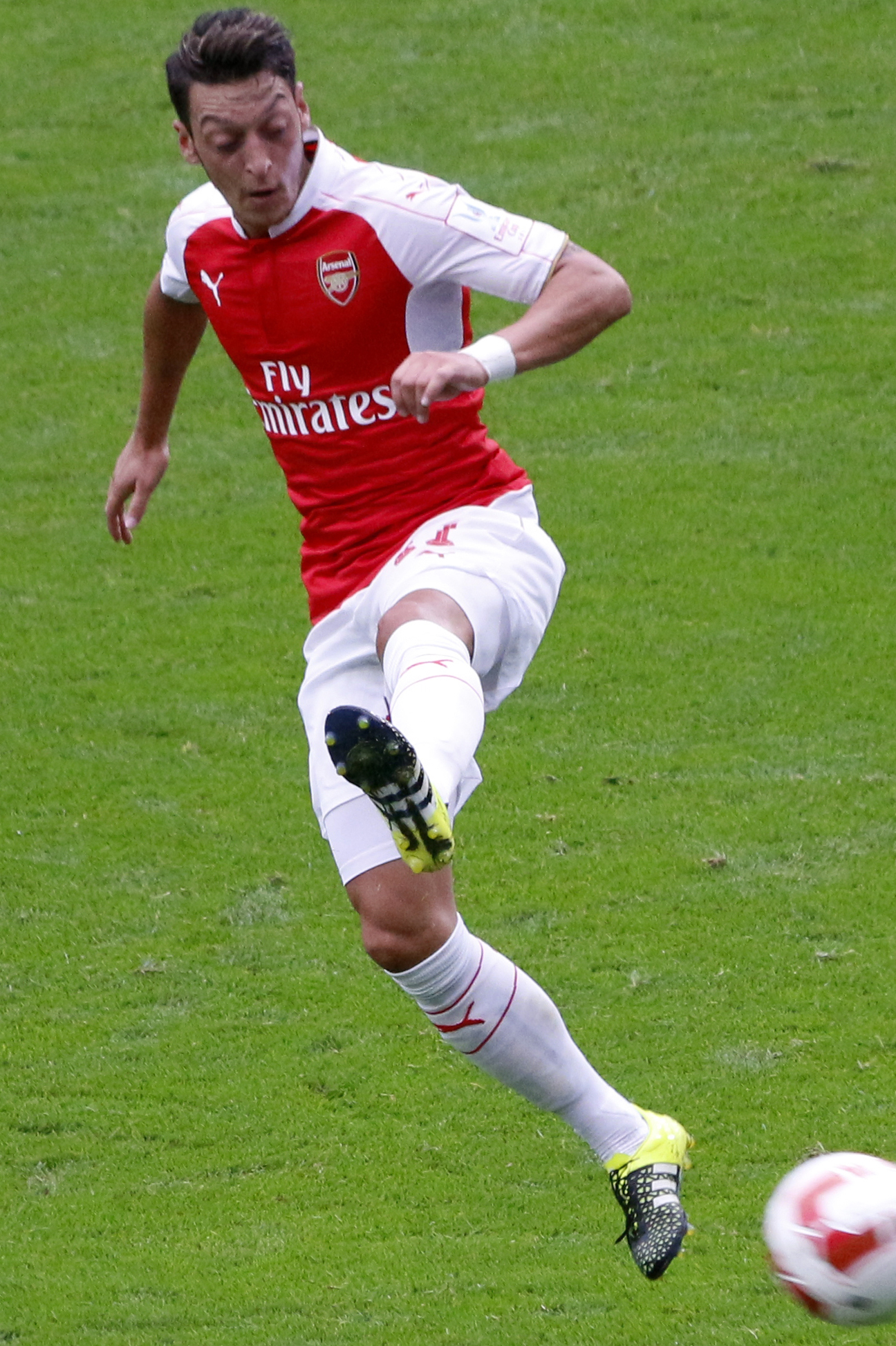
Mesut Özil scored his only goal of the tournament against Lyon.

Name	Team	Goals
(Spain) Santi Cazorla	(England) Arsenal	1
(France) Olivier Giroud	(England) Arsenal	1
(England) Alex-Oxlade Chamberlain	(England) Arsenal	1
(England) Theo Walcott	(England) Arsenal	1
(Wales) Aaron Ramsey	(England) Arsenal	1
(Germany) Mesut Özil	(England) Arsenal	1
(Nigeria) Alex Iwobi	(England) Arsenal	1
(Argentina) Matias Nahuel Leiva	(Spain) Villarreal	1
(Spain) Mario Gaspar	(Spain) Villarreal	1
(Spain) Bruno Soriano	(Spain) Villarreal	1
(Brazil) Léo Baptistão	(Spain) Villarreal	1
(Croatia) Ivan Perišić	(Germany) Wolfsburg	1
