= 2014 Emirates Cup =

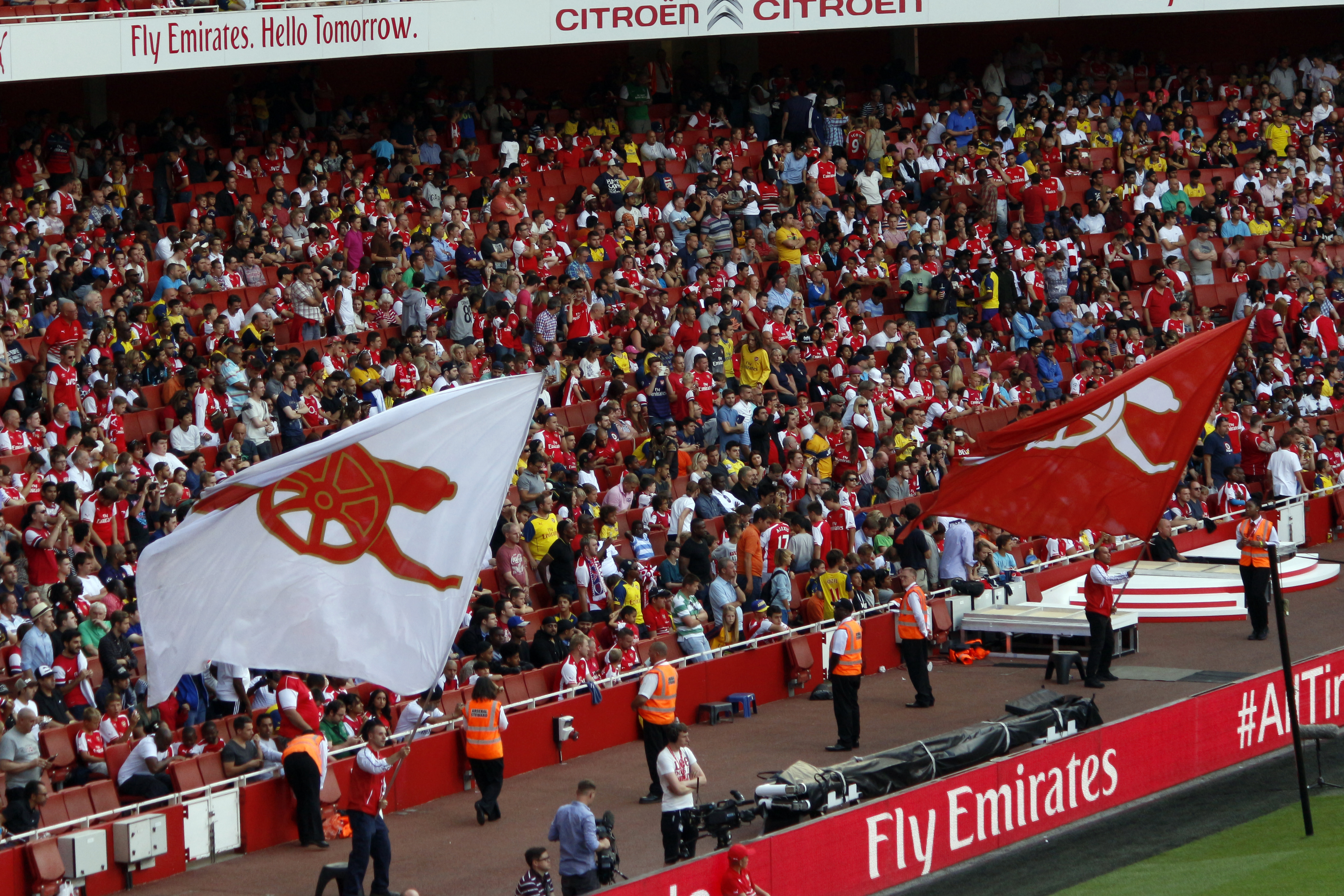

Tournament details
- Host country: England
- City: London
- Dates: 2–3 August
- Teams: 4 (from 1 confederation)
- Venue: 1 (in 1 host city)

Final positions
- Champions: Valencia (1st title)
- Runners-up: Arsenal
- Third place: Monaco
- Fourth place: Benfica

Tournament statistics
- Matches played: 4
- Goals scored: 15 (3.75 per match)
- Top scorer(s): Yaya Sanogo (4 goals)

The 2014 Emirates Cup was a pre-season football friendly tournament hosted by Arsenal at its home ground, the Emirates Stadium in London. It was the eighth Emirates Cup, an invitational competition inaugurated in 2007. Held on the weekend of 2–3 August 2014, the participants were Arsenal, Monaco, Valencia, and Benfica.

The competition follows a point scoring system whereby each team plays two matches, with three points awarded for a win, one point for a draw and none for a loss. An additional point is awarded for every goal scored. Arsenal did not face Valencia, and Benfica did not play against Monaco. On the first day of the Emirates Cup, Yaya Sanogo scored four goals as Arsenal eased to a 5–1 victory over Benfica, while Valencia and Monaco played out a 2–2 draw. Arsenal's failure to earn a point against Monaco on the final day meant Valencia won the tournament having come from a goal down to beat Benfica by two clear goals.

== Background ==
The Emirates Cup began in July 2007 once Arsenal finalised plans to stage a pre-season competition at its home ground. Primeira Liga champions Benfica, La Liga club Valencia, and Ligue 1 side Monaco were confirmed as participants for the 2014 edition, alongside hosts Arsenal in May. It marked Valencia's second appearance in the tournament; the club acted as Hamburg's replacements in 2007. Arsenal chief executive Ivan Gazidis said the tournament had "proved to be an overwhelming success" now in its seventh year and added in a statement, "Not only does the tournament offer supporters the first chance to see the team play at Emirates Stadium before the start of the new season, it will of course also provide a very competitive level of preparation for all the teams ahead of the 2014/2015 season."

== Summary ==
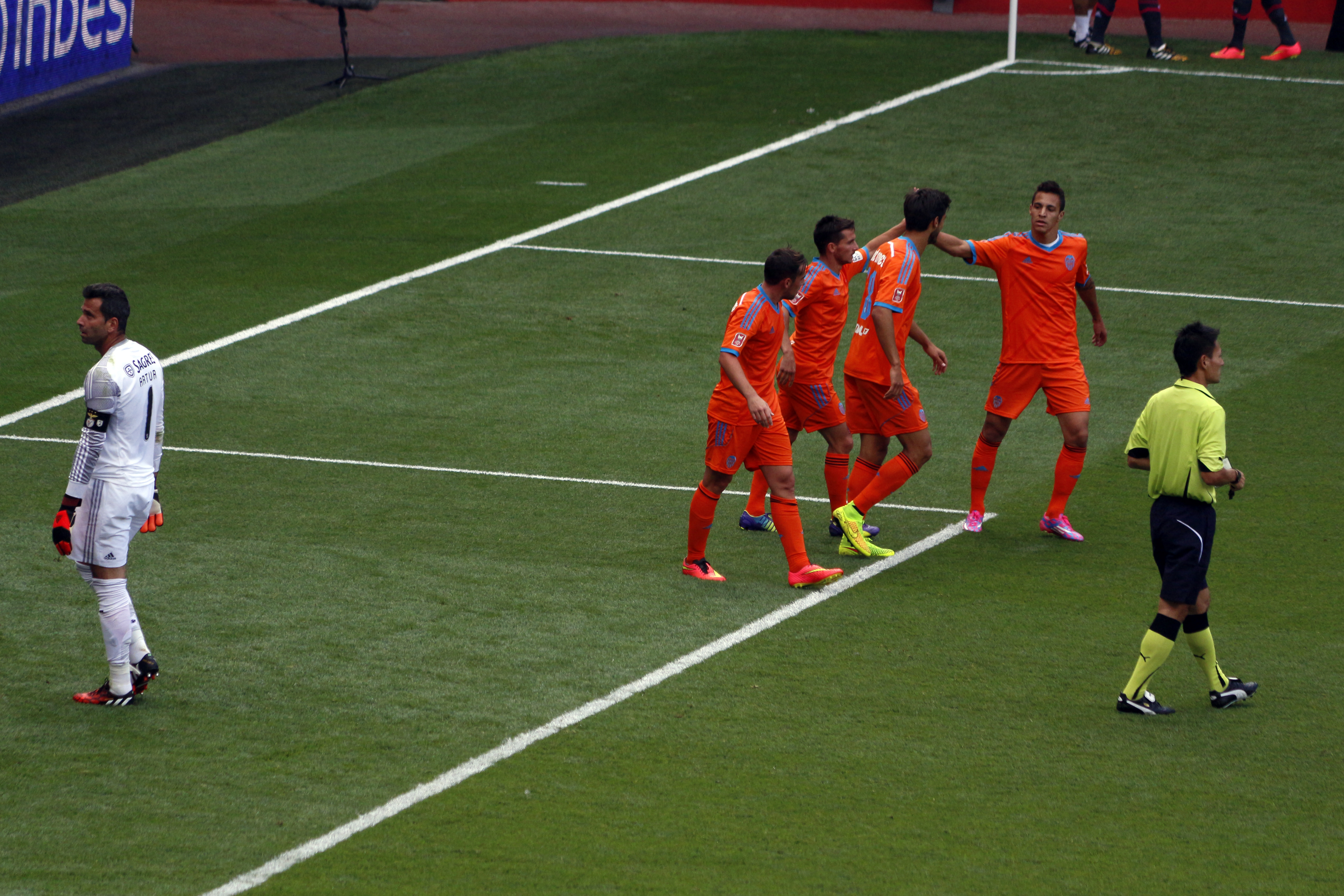
The Valencia players celebrate Paco Alcácer's goal against Monaco.

Valencia faced Monaco on the opening day of the 2014 Emirates Cup. Monaco coach Leonardo Jardim fielded an expensively assembled team, which included midfielders João Moutinho and Geoffrey Kondogbia, and striker Radamel Falcao all on the substitutes' bench. Valencia started well and created the game's first chance in the 8th minute – Rodrigo De Paul collected a pass from Antonio Barragán and his effort sailed over the crossbar. Sofiane Feghouli then forced goalkeeper Danijel Subašić into a save, before Anthony Martial created Monaco's first meaningful chance in the 23rd minute which was on target. Despite the Spanish side's domination, Monaco took the lead just on the half-hour mark. From Moutinho's corner, Rúben Vezo tried to divert Aymen Abdennour's connection to the ball, but inadvertently scored an own goal. Valencia got back into the game via another own goal; Barragán's cross was knocked into his own net by defender Ricardo Carvalho. The Spanish side grew in confidence as a result and controlled the midfield for a short period of time. They went ahead in the second half through Paco Alcácer's goal, but Lucas Ocampos equalised for Monaco in the 80th minute and the score stayed 2–2 at the final whistle.

Arsenal played Benfica in the day's second match. Alexis Sánchez, who joined Arsenal from Barcelona in the summer was named in the squad, while new signing Calum Chambers started in defence. The hosts made a lively start and went ahead in the 26th minute; Yaya Sanogo with his back on goal managed to back-flick the ball past goalkeeper Artur Moraes. Sanogo and Héctor Bellerín linked up well to set Joel Campbell up to score Arsenal's second and before the half was over Sanogo added two more goals to complete a hat-trick. Arsenal made it 5–0 early in the second half as Sanogo profited from Artur's failure to hold onto the ball. Nicolás Gaitán scored Benfica's only goal of the match, but the hosts were rarely troubled after that. Arsenal manager Arsène Wenger said of his opponents after the game: "It is very difficult to draw any conclusions after a game like that. Benfica might be on a different level of preparation. But for important periods of the game we played the way we want to play."

On the second day Valencia beat Benfica 3–1. The Spanish side went a goal behind in the second minute after Benfica forward Franco Jara ran down the right and crossed the ball in the penalty area for Derley to score. Though Valencia responded well by creating a few chances of their own, Benfica almost scored a second, but for Jara's 25 yards (23 m) strike hitting the crossbar in the 39th minute. As the match resumed in the second half, Valencia started well and equalised in the 49th minute thanks to José Gayà. Four minutes later Pablo Piatti scored and Andrés Guardado made sure of Valencia's victory when he took advantage of Artur's inability to hold onto the ball.

Arsenal went into the final day of the tournament as favourites to win the Emirates Cup. Against Monaco, they started Sánchez and Mathieu Debuchy, while Olivier Giroud came in for Sanogo – the notable changes from the win against Benfica. Monaco's Falcao headed in the only goal of the match, coming at a time when his team "became more urgent". Though Arsenal picked up the pace in the second half, aided by Wenger's substitutions and the decision to play Sánchez in a central forward position, they were unable to score. Valencia therefore won the tournament, finishing one point ahead of runners-up Arsenal.

== Standings ==
Each team played two matches, with three points awarded for a win, one point for a draw and a point for every goal scored. In addition, shots on target were taken into account and used to decide the competition winners if teams are level on points and goal difference.

Pos	Team	Pld	W	D	L	GF	GA	GD	Pts
1	Valencia	2	1	1	0	5	3	+2	9
2	Arsenal	2	1	0	1	5	2	+3	8
3	Monaco	2	1	1	0	3	2	+1	7
4	Benfica	2	0	0	2	2	8	−6	2

== Matches ==
2 August 2014
14:00 BST

Valencia	2–2	Monaco
Carvalho 37' (o.g.); Alcácer 69'	Report	Vezo 30' (o.g.); Ocampos 80'

Emirates Stadium, London
Attendance: ?
Referee: Michael Oliver

2 August 2014
16:20 BST

Arsenal	5–1	Benfica
Sanogo 26', 44', 45+1', 49'; Campbell 40'	Report	Gaitán 61'

Emirates Stadium, London
Attendance: ?
Referee: Lee Mason

3 August 2014
14:00 BST

Benfica	1–3	Valencia
Derley 2'	Report	Gayà 49'; Piatti 54'; Guardado 60'

Emirates Stadium, London
Attendance: 30,000
Referee: Ryuji Sato

3 August 2014
16:20 BST

Arsenal	0–1	Monaco
	Report	Falcao 37'

Emirates Stadium, London
Attendance: 50,000
Referee: Martin Atkinson

== Goalscorers ==
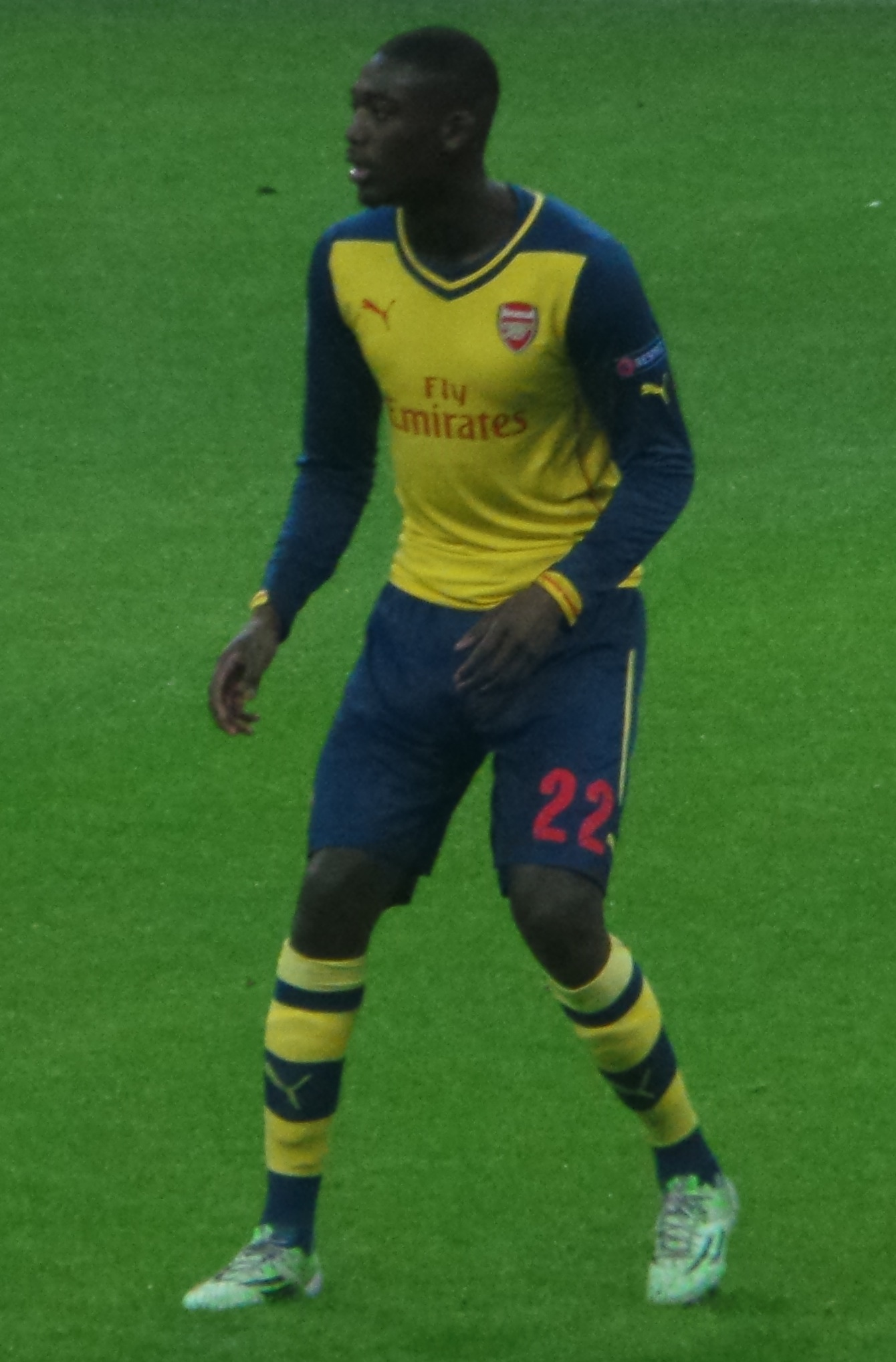
Yaya Sanogo was the tournament's top scorer, with four goals.

Rank	Player	Club	Goals
1	(France) Yaya Sanogo	Arsenal	4
2	(Brazil) Derley	Benfica	1
2	(Spain) Paco Alcácer	Valencia	1
2	(Costa Rica) Joel Campbell	Arsenal	1
2	(Colombia) Radamel Falcao	Monaco	1
2	(Spain) José Gayà	Valencia	1
2	(Argentina) Pablo Piatti	Valencia	1
2	(Mexico) Andrés Guardado	Valencia	1
2	(Argentina) Lucas Ocampos	Monaco	1
Own goals	(Portugal) Ricardo Carvalho	Monaco	1
Own goals	(Portugal) Rúben Vezo	Valencia	1
