= 2007 Emirates Cup =

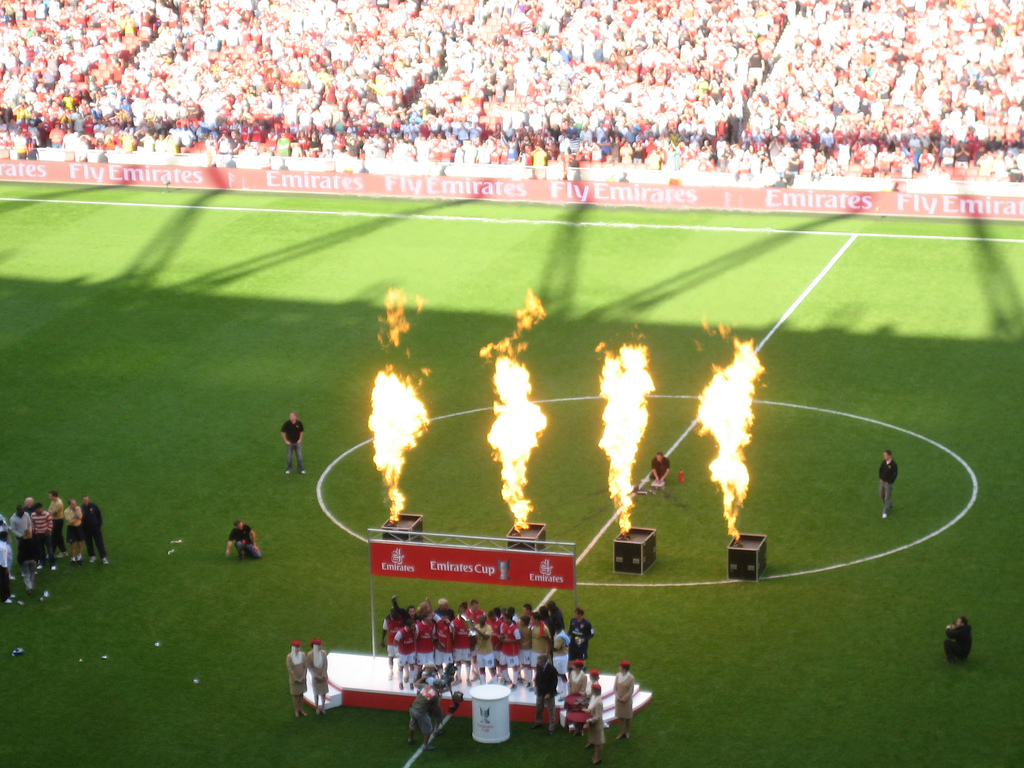

Tournament details
- Host country: England
- City: London
- Dates: 28 – 29 July
- Teams: 4 (from 1 confederation)
- Venue: 1 (in 1 host city)

Final positions
- Champions: Arsenal (1st title)
- Runners-up: Paris Saint-Germain
- Third place: Valencia
- Fourth place: Inter Milan

Tournament statistics
- Matches played: 4
- Goals scored: 11 (2.75 per match)
- Top scorer(s): Péguy Luyindula (2 goals)

The 2007 Emirates Cup was the inaugural pre-season men's association football friendly tournament hosted by Arsenal. It took place at the club's home ground, the Emirates Stadium during the weekend of 28 July and 29 July 2007. The idea of a pre-season competition staged at Arsenal first came about during the 2006–07 season; once planning was complete, the club invited three other European clubs to participate in the event: Inter Milan, Paris Saint-Germain and Valencia. The latter club replaced Hamburg as the German side had Intertoto Cup commitments.

The competition follows a point scoring system much like the Amsterdam Tournament, whereby each team plays two matches, with three points awarded for a win, one point for a draw and none for a loss. An additional point is awarded for every goal scored. Arsenal did not face Valencia, and Inter did not play against Paris Saint-Germain. On the first day of the Emirates Cup, Valencia beat Inter Milan by two goals, while Arsenal defeated Paris Saint-Germain 2–1. Valencia's loss to Paris Saint-Germain on day two meant Arsenal needed to beat Inter Milan in order to finish top of the group. They went a goal behind in the second half, but goals from Alexander Hleb and Robin van Persie secured the cup win. The tournament was well attended with over 110,000 filling the Emirates Stadium across the two-day tournament.

== Background ==
In March 2007 Arsenal announced their intention to stage a pre-season competition at their home ground, the Emirates Stadium. Managing director Keith Edelman revealed plans were at an exploratory stage, and added: "It would be in pre-season, around late July, and tickets would be reasonably priced. We feel it could be a really exciting event." Details of the tournament were formally announced five weeks later, with Italian champions Inter Milan, French side Paris Saint-Germain and German outfit Hamburg confirmed as participants. Hamburg's qualification into the Intertoto Cup however meant they withdrew from the competition; the club were subsequently replaced by Spain's Valencia. The two-day competition was televised live in the United Kingdom by Sky Sports.

== Summary ==
Inter Milan faced Valencia in the opening match of the tournament; manager Roberto Mancini named an experienced Inter team that included defender Marco Materazzi and forward Zlatan Ibrahimović. Valencia began the much the stronger of the two, and went ahead in the 13th minute when Jaime Gavilán scored. The midfielder had received the ball from a cross, and managed to guide it under goalkeeper Francesco Toldo. Referee Alan Kelly turned down Inter Milan's appeals for a penalty, when a challenge by Valencia defender Iván Helguera had caused Luís Figo to tumble in the area. Inter nearly equalised through Maxwell as his effort hit the post, but conceded their second goal of the match minutes before the interval. Materazzi fouled David Villa outside the penalty area, and his deflected free-kick sailed into the net. Substitutions for both sides in the second half led to further chances, all of which came to nothing.

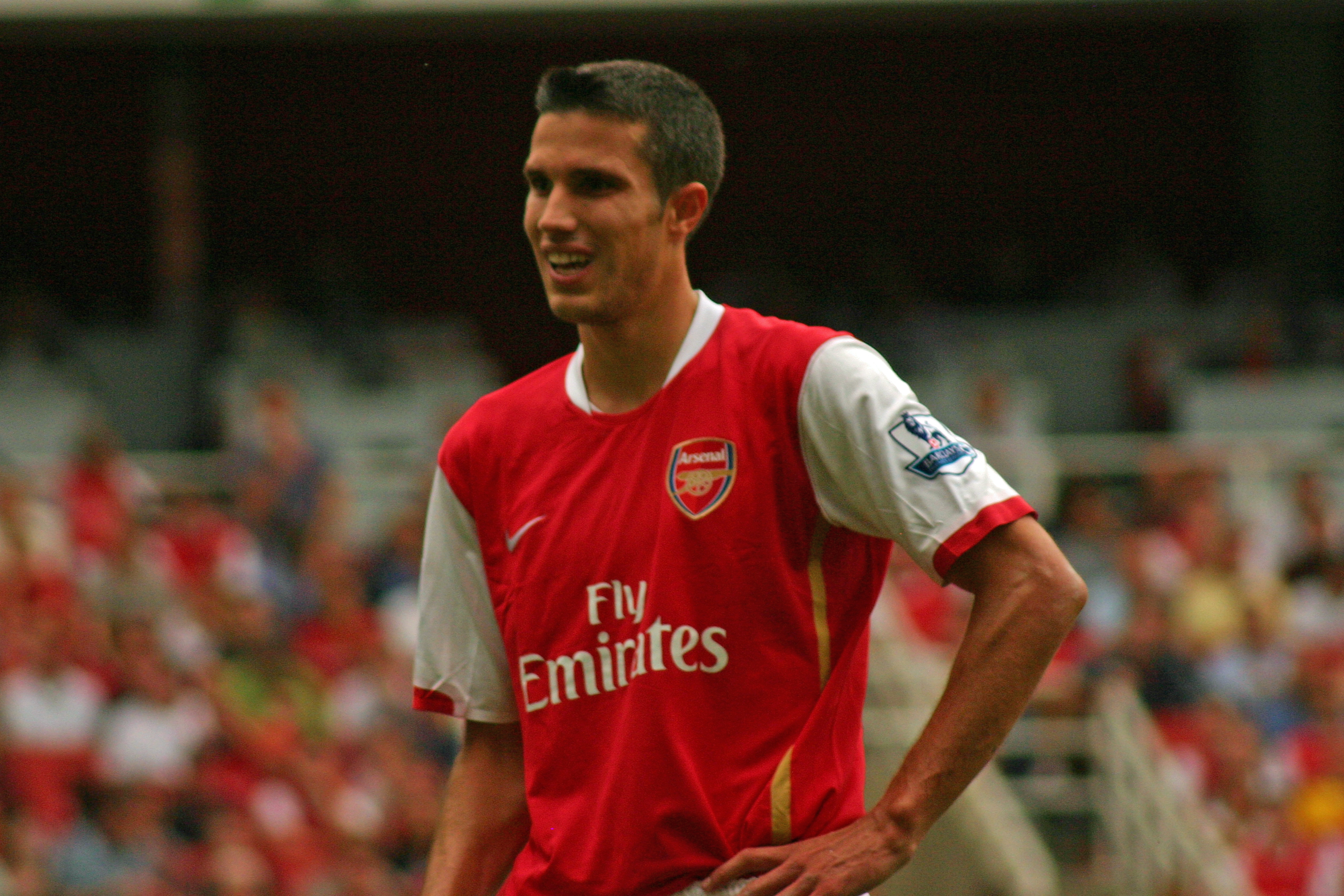
Robin van Persie scored Arsenal's winning goal against Inter Milan.

The hosts Arsenal played Paris Saint-Germain in the later game. Although the visitors dominated play in the first 45 minutes, they went behind at the cusp of half-time, when Arsenal midfielder Mathieu Flamini scored. He collected the ball from Nicklas Bendtner and his first-time shot went in off the post. Wenger tweaked his team's formation after the break from their customary 4–4–2 to 4–4–1–1 and made five changes to his team. He positioned right-back Emmanuel Eboué as a midfielder, and Alexander Hleb behind Bendtner. Arsenal's performance improved in the second half and they doubled their lead through Bendtner in the 70th minute. Goalkeeper Manuel Almunia immediately denied Pauleta with a stretching save at the far post, but could not prevent Péguy Luyindula from scoring. Arsenal held on to win by two goals.

On the second day of the tournament Paris Saint-Germain beat Valencia by three goals. The French club had made five changes to the side that lost against Arsenal, which worked to their favour as Amara Diané and David Ngog each scored inside 30 minutes. Valencia struggled to match their opponents' intensity, though remained a threat with Fernando Morientes' arrival in the second half. The match was settled with five minutes remaining of normal time; Luyindula, on as a substitute, received a pass from Loris Arnaud which drew goalkeeper Timo Hildebrand out of his area and allowed the French striker to tap the ball into an empty net.

Needing to beat Inter Milan to win the Emirates Cup, Arsenal failed to take the initiative and went behind after 62 minutes. William Gallas' negligence to spot the incoming David Suazo meant the Inter striker was able to head the ball past goalkeeper Jens Lehmann. Arsenal regrouped quickly and scored five minutes later; a well-worked move between Eboué and Bacary Sagna set Hleb up to shoot, but his effort was saved by Toldo. The ball rebounded to the Arsenal midfielder, whose second shot went into the far corner. Near the end of normal time Robin van Persie scored a "wonder goal" to secure the win. Collecting a long pass from Eboué, the striker weaved past his opponent and dragged the ball back, before hitting it high into the far corner. Wenger said of Van Persie's winner: "It was a great goal but I'm pleased we had a great team performance. As a team I think we played very well and that is most important."

== Standings ==
Each team plays two matches, with three points awarded for a win, one point for a draw, and a point for every goal scored.

Pos	Team	Pld	W	D	L	GF	GA	GD	Pts
1	Arsenal	2	2	0	0	4	2	+2	10
2	Paris Saint-Germain	2	1	0	1	4	2	+2	7
3	Valencia	2	1	0	1	2	3	−1	5
4	Inter Milan	2	0	0	2	1	4	−3	1

== Matches ==
Day 1

28 July 2007
14:00 BST

Inter Milan	0–2	Valencia
	Report	Gavilán 13'; Villa 39'

Emirates Stadium, London
Attendance: 55,106
Referee: Alan Kelly

28 July 2007
16:15 BST

Arsenal	2–1	Paris Saint-Germain
Flamini 45'; Bendtner 70'	Report	Luyindula 80'

Emirates Stadium, London
Attendance: 55,106
Referee: Peter Walton

Day 2

29 July 2007
14:00 BST

Paris Saint-Germain	3–0	Valencia
Diane 15'; Ngog 30'; Luyindula 85'	Report

Emirates Stadium, London
Attendance: 59,821
Referee: Andre Marriner

29 July 2007
16:15 BST

Arsenal	2–1	Inter Milan
Hleb 67'; Van Persie 85'	Report	Suazo 62'

Emirates Stadium, London
Attendance: 59,821
Referee: Mark Halsey

== Goalscorers ==
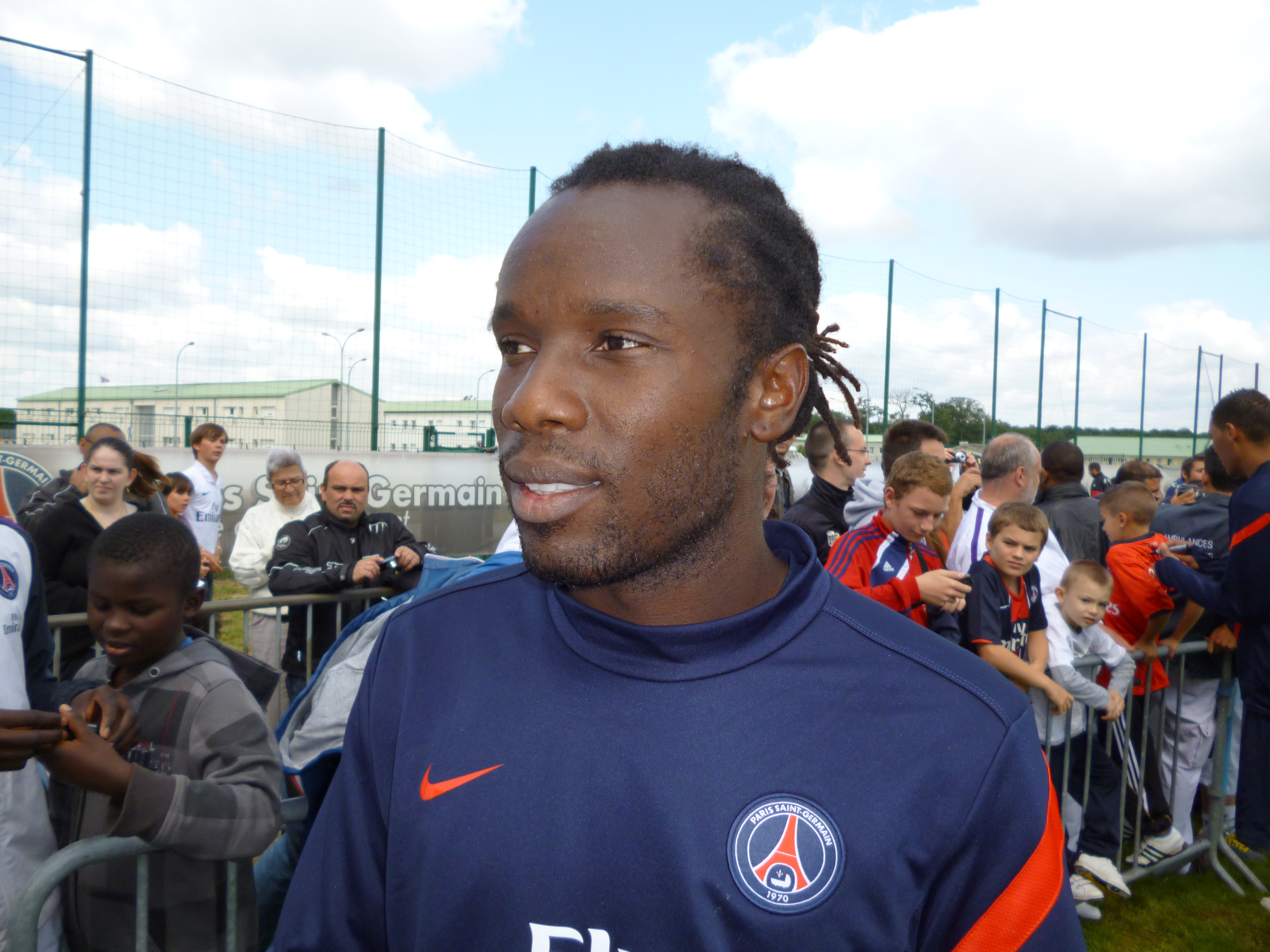
Peguy Luyindula was the tournament's topscorer, with two goals.

Rank	Name	Team	Goals
1	(France) Péguy Luyindula	Paris Saint-Germain	2
2	(Denmark) Nicklas Bendtner	Arsenal	1
2	(Ivory Coast) Amara Diane	Paris Saint-Germain	1
2	(France) Mathieu Flamini	Arsenal	1
2	(Spain) Jaime Gavilán	Valencia	1
2	(Belarus) Alexander Hleb	Arsenal	1
2	(France) David Ngog	Paris Saint-Germain	1
2	(Honduras) David Suazo	Inter Milan	1
2	(Netherlands) Robin van Persie	Arsenal	1
2	(Spain) David Villa	Valencia	1
