= 2008 Emirates Cup =

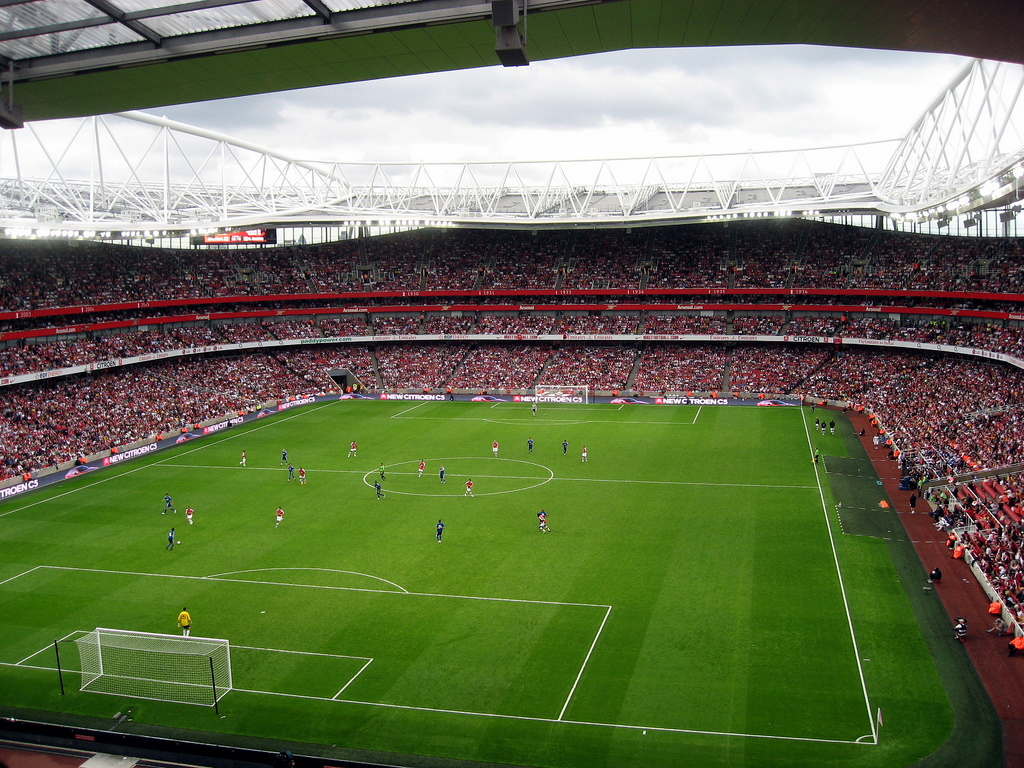

Tournament details
- Host country: England
- City: London
- Dates: 2–3 August
- Teams: 4 (from 1 confederation)
- Venue: 1 (in 1 host city)

Final positions
- Champions: Hamburg (1st title)
- Runners-up: Real Madrid
- Third place: Arsenal
- Fourth place: Juventus

Tournament statistics
- Matches played: 4
- Goals scored: 8 (2 per match)
- Top scorer: Ivica Olić (2 goals)

The 2008 Emirates Cup was a pre-season football friendly tournament hosted by Arsenal at its home ground, the Emirates Stadium in London. It was the second Emirates Cup, an invitational competition inaugurated in 2007. Held on the weekend of 2–3 August 2008, the participants of the tournament were Arsenal, Real Madrid, Juventus, and Hamburg.

Each team played two matches, with three points awarded for a win, one point for a draw and none for a loss. An additional point is awarded for every goal scored. Arsenal did not face Hamburg, and Real Madrid did not play against Juventus. On the opening day of the tournament, Real Madrid beat Hamburg 2–1, while Arsenal lost to Juventus by a single goal. Although the hosts defeated Real on day two, Hamburg won the Emirates Cup as they recorded a 3–0 victory against Juventus.

== Background ==
The Emirates Cup began in July 2007 once Arsenal finalised plans to stage a pre-season competition at its home ground. Named after Arsenal's main sponsor Emirates, the competition's inaugural edition was attended by over 110,000 people across the two days. La Liga champions Real Madrid, Italian outfit Juventus and German side Hamburg were confirmed as participants for the 2008 edition, alongside hosts Arsenal. Hamburg's inclusion came after their withdrawal a year earlier due to European commitments. Coverage of the two-day event was broadcast in the United Kingdom on Sky Sports.

== Summary ==
Real Madrid took on Hamburg on the opening day of the tournament. There was a contingent of former Premier League players and staff, as Real Madrid's lineup featured Ruud van Nistelrooy and Jerzy Dudek, while Hamburg was coached by former Tottenham Hotspur manager Martin Jol. Van Nistelrooy almost scored inside three minutes of the first half when his teammate Raúl put him through on goal. Hamburg goalkeeper Frank Rost distracted the striker by rushing towards him. Paolo Guerrero headed wide for Hamburg, before Real Madrid took the lead five minutes before the half-hour mark. Hamburg's Nigel de Jong was beaten off the ball in his own penalty area by right back Míchel Salgado, who set Van Nistelrooy up for a straightforward tap in. Real Madrid dominated and were punished for missing multiple chances to extend their lead when Mohamed Zidan scored Hamburg's equaliser. Receiving the ball from the left-hand corner of Real Madrid's half, the striker curled the ball past goalkeeper Dudek which went in off the crossbar. David Jarolím and Guerrero came close to putting Hamburg 2–1 in front, but Dani Parejo five minutes from time sealed the win for Real Madrid, heading in Juanmi Callejón's cross.

Real Madrid lost to Arsenal on the second day of the Emirates Cup. Emmanuel Adebayor scored the only goal of the match, converting a penalty in the second half. The striker was booed throughout the tournament as he failed to clarify his plans for the future during pre-season, even though he had agreed a contract extension according to Arsenal manager Arsène Wenger. "To my face he told me he wants to stay at the club and that is what happened," Wenger told reporters. Arsenal were defeated by Juventus the day before; David Trezeguet's goal came after the hosts failed to deal with a free kick properly. Gaël Clichy, Cesc Fàbregas and Kolo Touré were absent for Arsenal, though captain William Gallas did feature in the second half. New signing Samir Nasri started the match against Real Madrid.

Hamburg won the 2008 Emirates Cup after beating Juventus by three goals. Guerrero scored the first in the 19th minute and Ivica Olić added two more in stoppage time.

== Standings ==
Each team played two matches, with three points awarded for a win, one point for a draw, and a point for every goal scored.

Pos	Team	Pld	W	D	L	GF	GA	GD	Pts
1	Hamburg	2	1	0	1	4	2	+2	7
2	Real Madrid	2	1	0	1	2	2	0	5
3	Arsenal	2	1	0	1	1	1	0	4
4	Juventus	2	1	0	1	1	3	−2	4

Rules for classification: 1) points; 2) goal difference; 3) number of goals scored.

== Matches ==
2 August 2008
14:00 BST

Real Madrid	2–1	Hamburg
Van Nistelrooy 25'; Parejo 85'	Report	Zidan 53'

Emirates Stadium, London
Attendance: 51,000
Referee: Alan Kelly

2 August 2008
16:15 BST

Arsenal	0–1	Juventus
	Report	Trezeguet 37'

Emirates Stadium, London
Attendance: 51,000
Referee: Peter Walton

3 August 2008
14:00 BST

Juventus	0–3	Hamburg
	Report	Guerrero 19'; Olić 90+1', 90+2'

Emirates Stadium, London
Attendance: 51,000
Referee: Chris Foy

3 August 2008
16:15 BST

Arsenal	1–0	Real Madrid
Adebayor 49' (pen.)	Report

Emirates Stadium, London
Attendance: 51,000
Referee: Mark Clattenburg

== Goalscorers ==
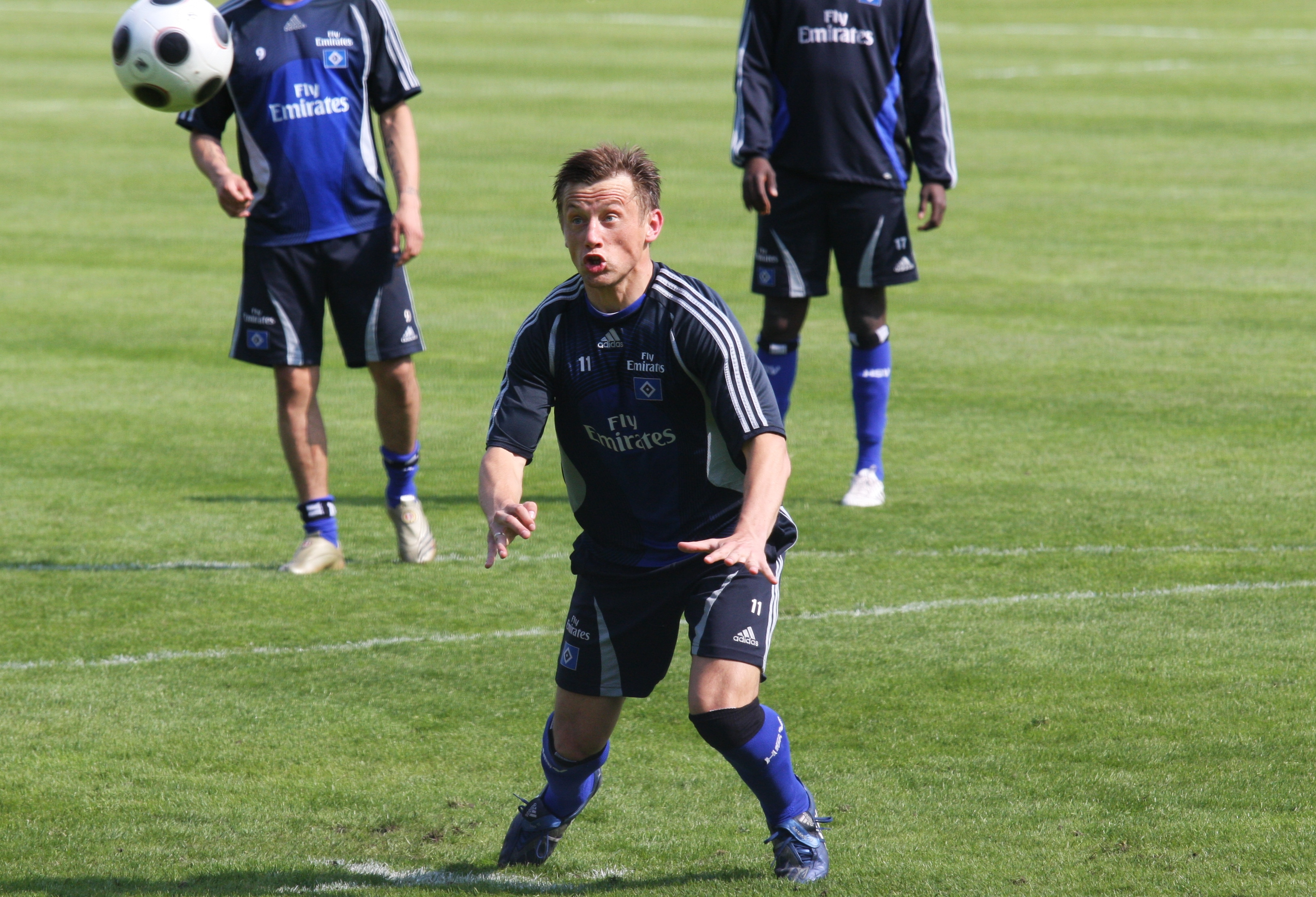
Ivica Olić was the tournament's topscorer, with two goals.

Rank	Name	Team	Goals
1	(Croatia) Ivica Olić	Hamburg	2
2	(Spain) Dani Parejo	Real Madrid	1
2	(France) David Trezeguet	Juventus	1
2	(Netherlands) Ruud van Nistelrooy	Real Madrid	1
2	(Egypt) Mohamed Zidan	Hamburg	1
2	(Peru) Paolo Guerrero	Hamburg	1
2	(Togo) Emmanuel Adebayor	Arsenal	1
