= 2011 Emirates Cup =

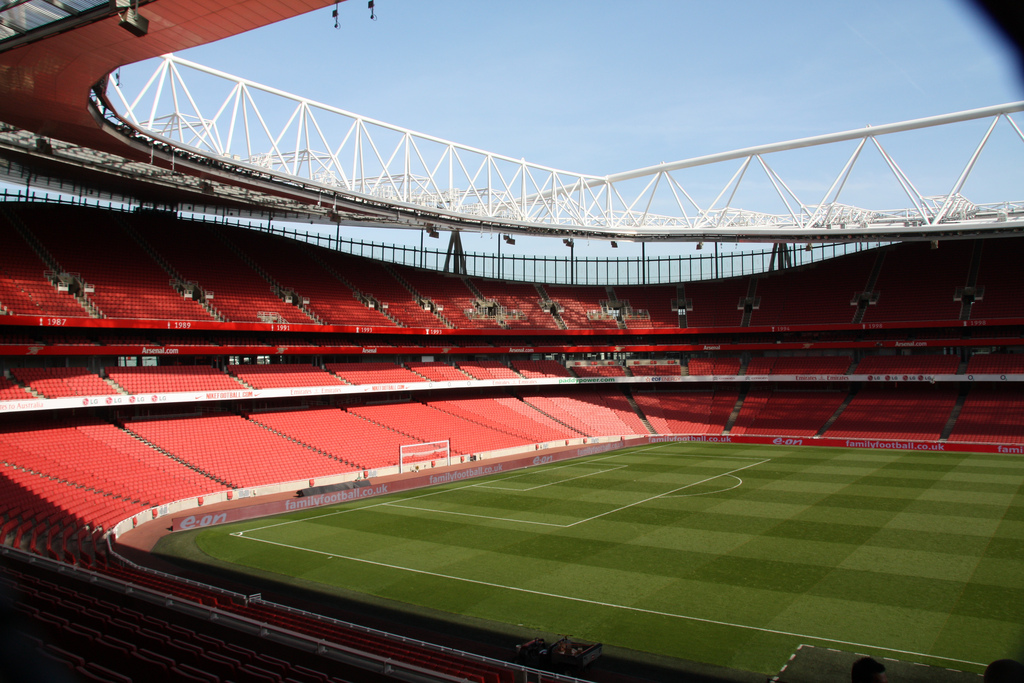
- Emirates Stadium

Tournament details
- Host country: England
- City: London
- Dates: 30 – 31 July
- Teams: 4 (from 3 confederations)
- Venue: 1 (in 1 host city)

Final positions
- Champions: New York Red Bulls (1st title)
- Runners-up: Paris Saint-Germain
- Third place: Arsenal
- Fourth place: Boca Juniors

Tournament statistics
- Matches played: 4
- Goals scored: 10 (2.5 per match)
- Top scorer(s): Robin van Persie (2 goals)

The 2011 Emirates Cup was a pre-season football friendly tournament hosted by Arsenal at its home ground, the Emirates Stadium in London. It was the fifth Emirates Cup, an invitational competition inaugurated in 2007. Held on the weekend of 30–31 July 2011, the participants were Arsenal, Boca Juniors, Paris Saint-Germain, and New York Red Bulls. The inclusion of the Red Bulls meant Thierry Henry returned to play against his former club, Arsenal. The 2011 edition, with the Red Bulls and Boca Juniors, also marked the first time clubs outside of UEFA's jurisdiction had participated in the competition.

The Emirates Cup follows a point scoring system much like the Amsterdam Tournament, whereby each team plays two matches, with three points awarded for a win, one point for a draw and none for a loss. For this event Arsenal and Paris Saint-Germain did not play each other, nor did Boca Juniors face New York Red Bulls. Unlike previous editions, additional points were not awarded for every goal scored. The Red Bulls won the Emirates Cup after beating PSG on the first day and then earning a point against Arsenal on the second. Paris Saint-Germain finished runners-up, while Arsenal came in third and Boca Juniors last.

== Background ==
The Emirates Cup began in July 2007 once Arsenal finalised plans to stage a pre-season competition at its home ground. Named after Arsenal's main sponsor Emirates, the competition's inaugural edition was attended by more than 110,000 people across the two days.

Argentine club Boca Juniors, French side Paris Saint-Germain and American club New York Red Bulls were confirmed as participants for the 2011 edition, alongside hosts Arsenal. The inclusion of Boca Juniors and New York Red Bulls marked the first time clubs outside of the UEFA zone had participated in the competition. The involvement of New York Red Bulls had added significance because Thierry Henry, who formerly played for Arsenal, faced his old club.

== Summary ==
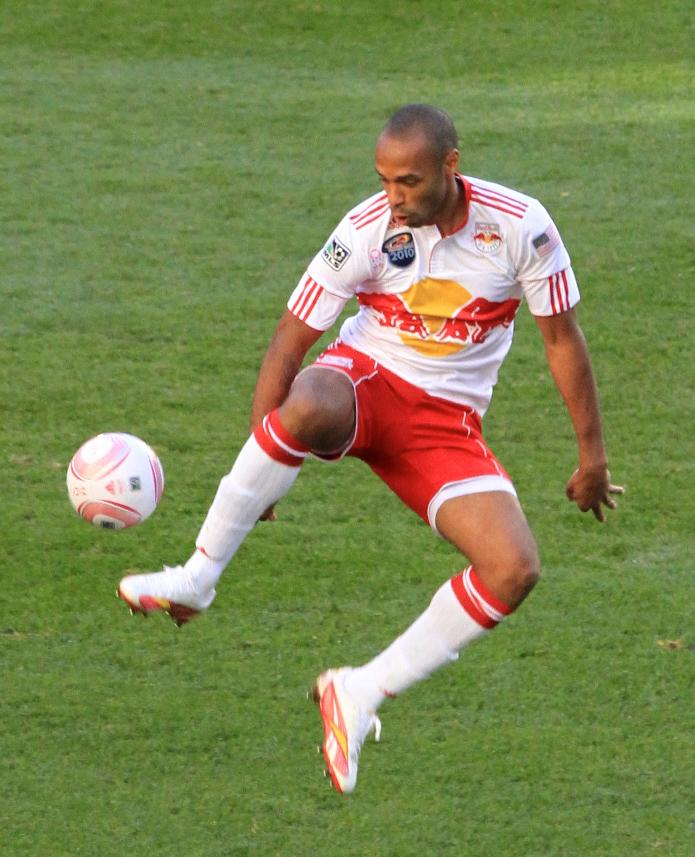
Thierry Henry featured in the tournament, playing for New York Red Bulls against his former club Arsenal.

The opening match of the 2011 Emirates Cup saw New York Red Bulls taking on Paris Saint-Germain. Defender Tim Ream captained the Red Bulls in place of Henry, who was rested, while Péguy Luyindula started up front for Paris Saint-Germain; the forward was the top scorer in the inaugural Emirates Cup. The only goal of the match came in the 27th minute. Joel Lindpere passed the ball to teammate Juan Agudelo, and made a darting run towards the Paris Saint-Germain penalty area. Agudelo passed it back to Lindpere, who evaded his closest opponent and placed the ball into the far right side of the net, past goalkeeper Salvatore Sirigu. For most of the game, Paris Saint-Germain struggled to get past the Red Bulls, who were comfortable in defence and "looked extremely dangerous on the counter attack" according to match reporter Joe Prince-Wright. Paris Saint-Germain enjoyed plenty of possession during the second half; Jérémy Ménez almost equalised but for Frank Rost's save. New York Red Bulls coach Hans Backe was pleased with his team's defensive performance and told reporters after the match: "For a U.S. team playing a team like Paris, I think it's a massive result for us."

Paris Saint-Germain's second match of the tournament was against Boca Juniors. The French side named a much-changed team from the defeat against the Red Bulls; Alphonse Areola started in goal, while Kevin Gameiro provided an attacking threat up front. In the 8th minute, Paris Saint-Germain went ahead when Jean-Eudes Maurice scored, and doubled their lead minutes before the break through Guillaume Hoarau's strike. Ceará scored directly from a free kick in the 79th minute and the final score was 3–0 in Paris Saint-Germain's favour. Boca Juniors faced Arsenal the day before and came from 2–0 down to draw against the hosts. Gervinho assisted Robin van Persie's goal in the first half a minute before the half-hour, and substitute Aaron Ramsey scored Arsenal's second, a long-range strike in the 46th minute. Poor defending on Arsenal's part allowed Lucas Viatri to get a goal for Boca Juniors in the 68th minute and three minutes later Pablo Mouche equalised. The post-match reaction in The Telegraph made reference to the futures of certain Arsenal players, particularly Cesc Fàbregas and Samir Nasri. Arsenal manager Arsène Wenger reiterated his desire to keep hold of his squad, saying: "We are not in a position where we have to sell our players, we want to keep our players and we are not looking for money."

The final match of the 2011 tournament was between Arsenal and New York Red Bulls. As expected Henry started for the Red Bulls, and Rafael Márquez also came into the lineup. For the hosts, Thomas Vermaelen, Jack Wilshere and Bacary Sagna all started in a strong first eleven. Van Persie's header in the 42nd minute looked to be enough for Arsenal to retain the trophy, but the Red Bulls capitalised on their opponents' carelessness in front of goal by equalising. Henry found his teammate Roy Miller, whose cross was diverted into the net by defender Kyle Bartley. The 1–1 draw meant the Red Bulls won the competition as they picked up more points than the other participants. Arsenal were booed off the pitch by their supporters, something Wenger said he understood, before adding "I don’t think we need to put any extra pressure on us now." He revealed he wanted Henry "to play the last five minutes" of the match for Arsenal which was denied by the referee, and paid tribute to his former player: "They say great clubs never die, it looks like great players never die as well, because Thierry showed us today he is still top quality with his feet and with his head".

== Standings ==
Pos	Team	Pld	W	D	L	GF	GA	GD	Pts
1	(United States) New York Red Bulls	2	1	1	0	2	1	+1	4
2	(France) Paris Saint-Germain	2	1	0	1	3	1	+2	3
3	(England) Arsenal	2	0	2	0	3	3	0	2
4	(Argentina) Boca Juniors	2	0	1	1	2	5	−3	1

Rules for classification: Three points were awarded for a win, and one point for a draw. Unlike previous Emirates Cups, no points were awarded for goals scored.

== Matches ==
30 July 2011
14:00 BST

New York Red Bulls	1–0	Paris Saint-Germain
Lindpere 27'	Report

Emirates Stadium, London
Attendance: 54,488
Referee: Kenny Ng

30 July 2011
16:20 BST

Arsenal	2–2	Boca Juniors
Van Persie 29'; Ramsey 46'	Report	Viatri 68'; Mouche 71'

Emirates Stadium, London
Attendance: 54,488
Referee: Martin Atkinson

31 July 2011
14:00 BST

Paris Saint-Germain	3–0	Boca Juniors
Maurice 8'; Hoarau 38'; Ceará 79'	Report

Emirates Stadium, London
Attendance: 60,011
Referee: Kristinn Jakobsson

31 July 2011
16:20 BST

Arsenal	1–1	New York Red Bulls
Van Persie 42'	Report	Bartley 84' (o.g.)

Emirates Stadium, London
Attendance: 60,011
Referee: Kevin Friend

== Goalscorers ==
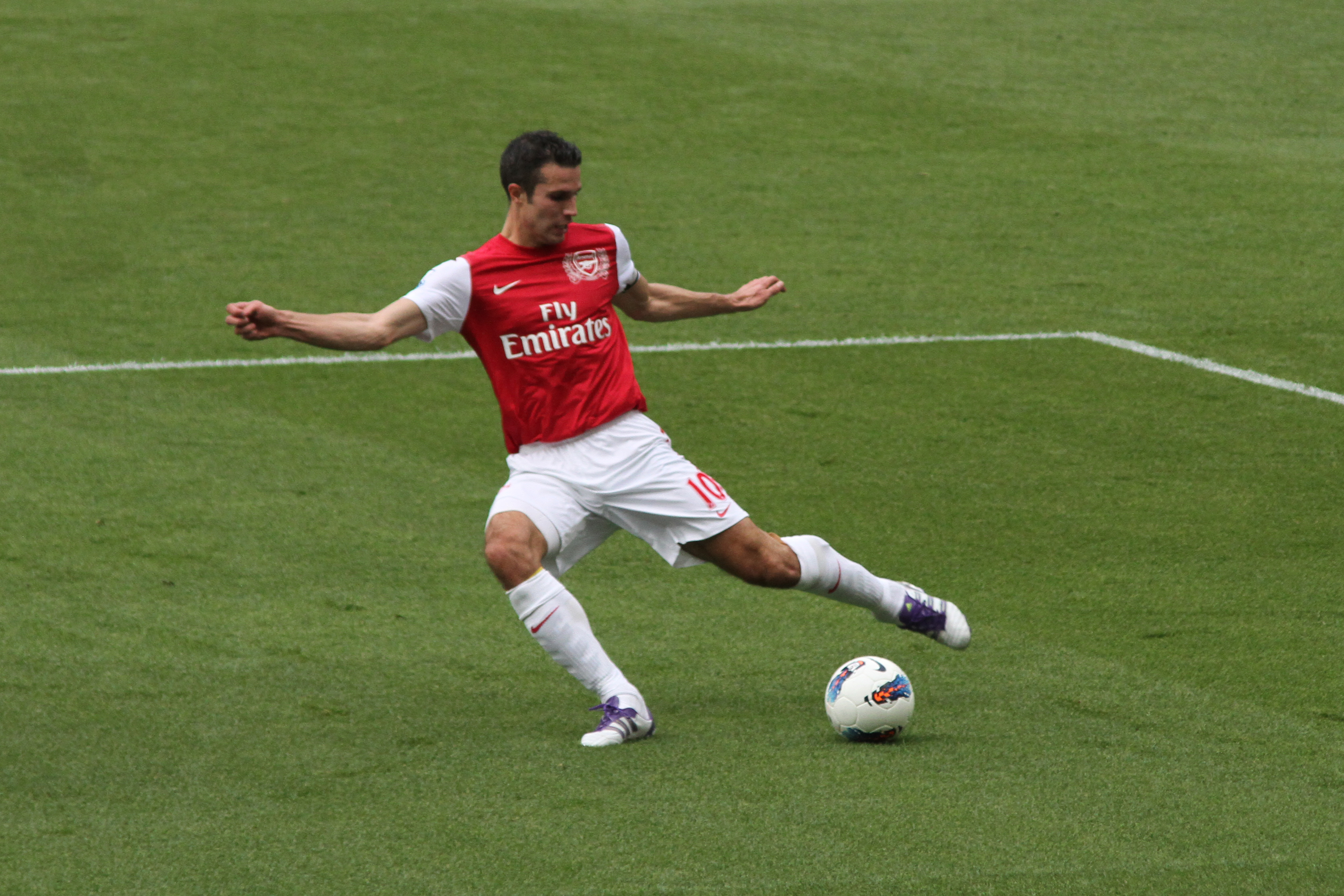
Robin van Persie scored in both of Arsenal's matches

Rank	Name	Team	Goals
1	(Netherlands) Robin van Persie	Arsenal	2
2	(Estonia) Joel Lindpere	New York Red Bulls	1
2	(Wales) Aaron Ramsey	Arsenal	1
2	(Argentina) Lucas Viatri	Boca Juniors	1
2	(Argentina) Pablo Mouche	Boca Juniors	1
2	(France) Jean-Eudes Maurice	Paris Saint-Germain	1
2	(France) Guillaume Hoarau	Paris Saint-Germain	1
2	(Brazil) Ceará	Paris Saint-Germain	1
Own goal	(England) Kyle Bartley	Arsenal	1
