= 2010 Emirates Cup =

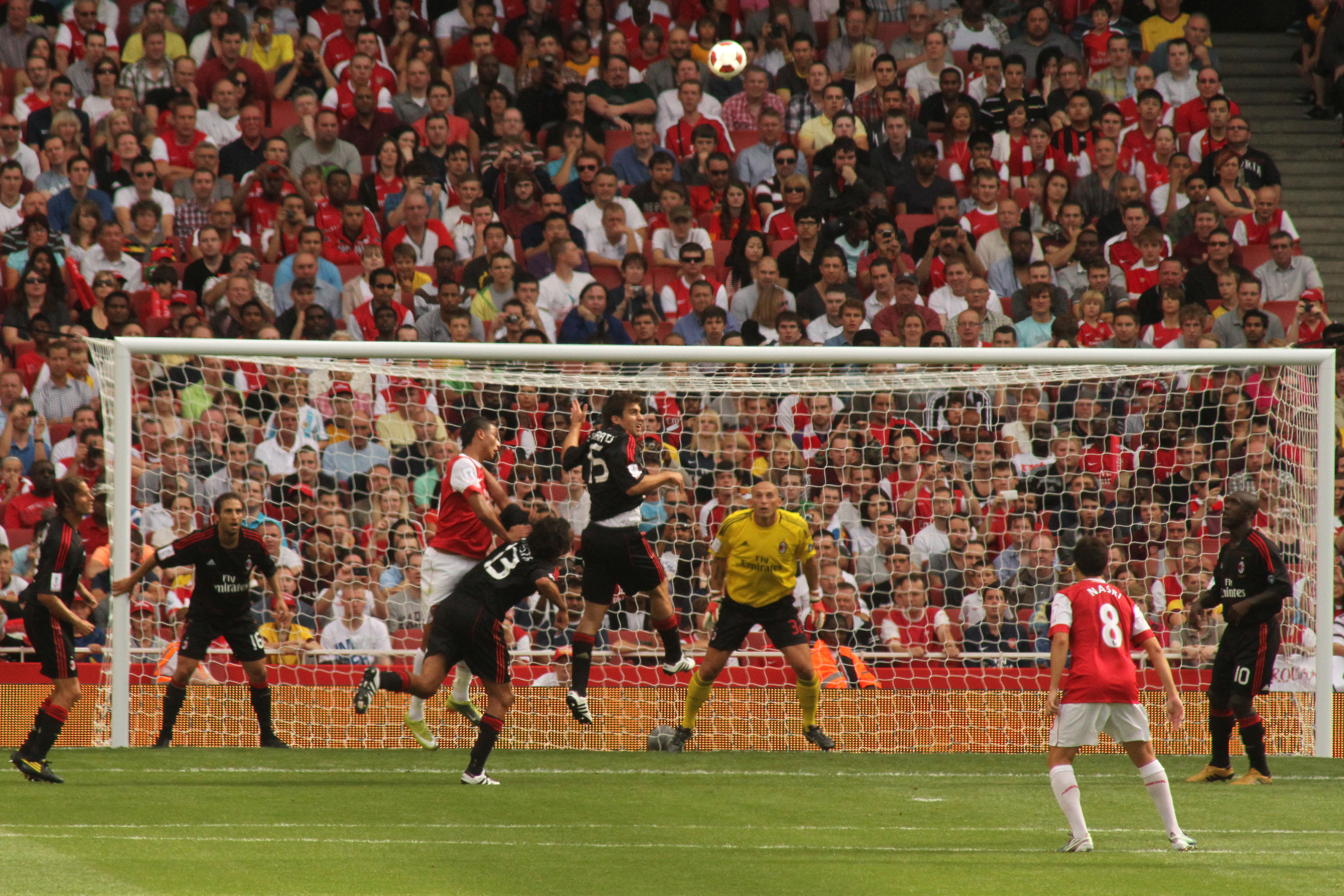
- Action between Arsenal and Milan on the first day of the tournament.

Tournament details
- Host country: England
- City: London
- Dates: 31 July – 1 August
- Teams: 4 (from 1 confederation)
- Venue: 1 (in 1 host city)

Final positions
- Champions: Arsenal (3rd title)
- Runners-up: Lyon
- Third place: Celtic
- Fourth place: Milan

Tournament statistics
- Matches played: 4
- Goals scored: 13 (3.25 per match)
- Top scorer: 13 players (1 goal)

The 2010 Emirates Cup was a pre-season football friendly tournament hosted by Arsenal at its home ground, the Emirates Stadium in London. It was the fourth Emirates Cup, an invitational competition inaugurated in 2007. Held on the weekend of 31 July and 1 August 2010, the participants were Arsenal, Lyon, Milan, and Celtic.

The Emirates Cup follows a point scoring system similar to the Amsterdam Tournament, whereby each team plays two matches, with three points awarded for a win, one point for a draw and none for a loss. Like previous editions, in 2010 an additional point was awarded for every goal scored. Arsenal did not face Lyon, and Celtic did not play against Milan. The first day saw Celtic come from two goals down to draw against Lyon. Marouane Chamakh scored on his home Arsenal debut, but it was not enough to secure a win as Alexandre Pato equalised for Milan in the second half. Arsenal retained the Emirates Cup on the final day as they beat Celtic. Lyon finished second after a 1–1 draw with fourth-place Milan, leaving Celtic in the third spot.

== Background ==
The Emirates Cup began in July 2007 once Arsenal finalised plans to stage a pre-season competition at its home ground. Named after Arsenal's main sponsor Emirates, the competition's inaugural edition was attended by more than 110,000 people across the two days.

Scottish club Celtic, Italian side Milan and French outfit Olympique Lyonnais (Lyon) were confirmed as participants for the 2010 edition, alongside hosts Arsenal. Arsenal chief executive Ivan Gazidis described the Emirates Cup as "one of the world's most prestigious pre-season tournaments", and added in a statement: "I'm sure all supporters are looking forward to the weekend, which not only offers the opportunity to watch two top quality matches each day, but of course, also provides the teams with a high level of preparation ahead of the forthcoming season." Coverage of the two-day event was broadcast in the United Kingdom on Sky Sports.

== Summary ==
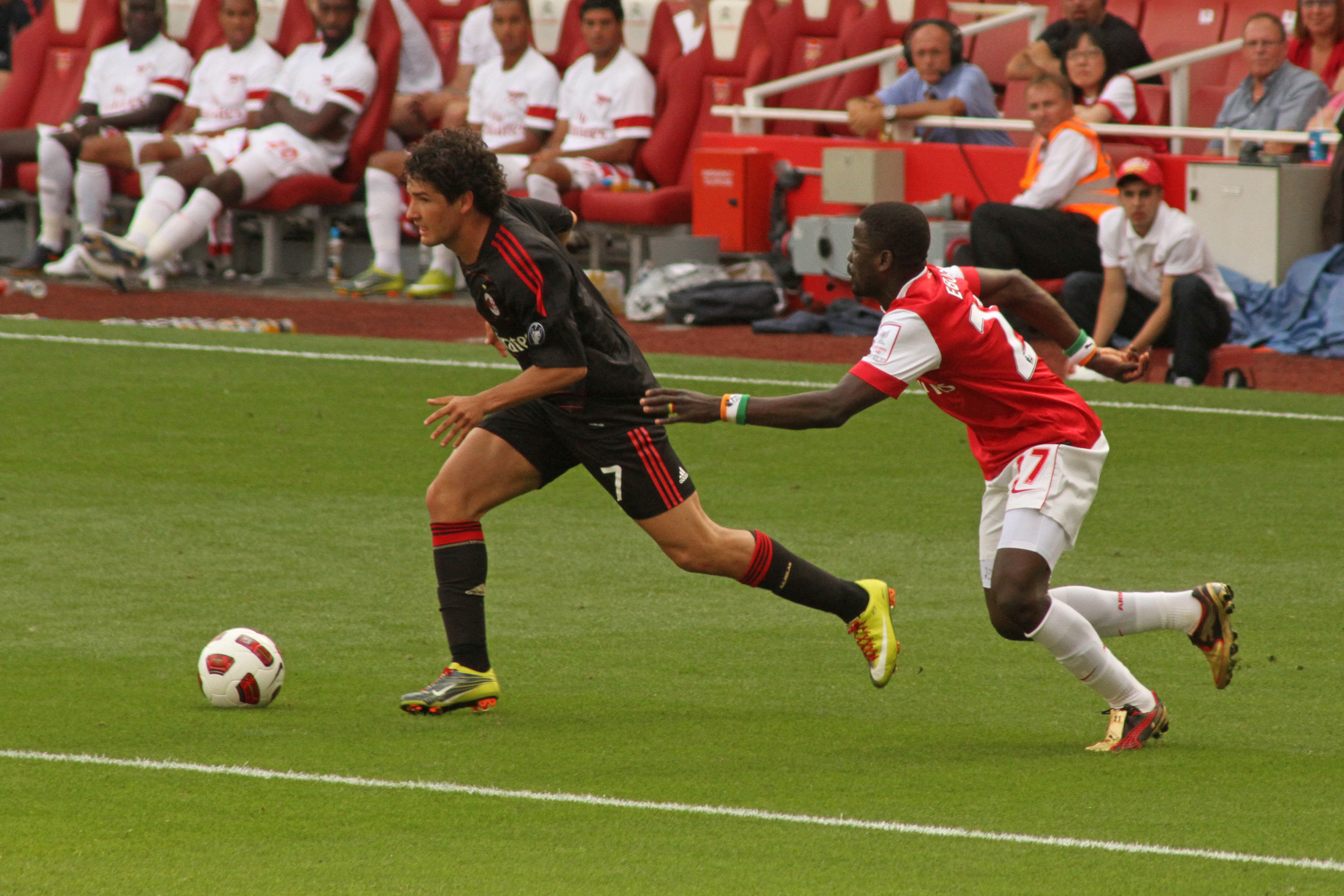
Alexandre Pato gets past Emmanuel Eboué during the friendly between Arsenal and Milan.

The tournament got underway on 31 July 2010; Celtic faced Lyon in the day's first match. Celtic manager Neil Lennon fielded a relatively strong side, led by striker Gary Hooper, while opposing coach Claude Puel started striker Alexandre Lacazette and midfielder Clément Grenier, and left first-choice goalkeeper Hugo Lloris on the substitutes' bench. Celtic's big crowd saw their side struggle to dictate play, though striker Marc-Antoine Fortune had the game's first real chance when his header hit the side-netting. Harry Novillo and Kim Källström had chances blocked, before Lyon took the lead in the 28th minute. Celtic conceded a free kick on the right, and from 25 yards out Michel Bastos hit a shot which flew past goalkeeper Łukasz Załuska. Early in the second half Lyon made it 2–0; Grenier slotted a through ball past the Celtic defence which reached Lacazette. The French forward cut the ball back to Novillo whose one-touch deflected off a Celtic player and into the net. Both sides subsequently made a number of substitutions, at which point Lyon came close to scoring a third but for Jeremy Pied's mishit. Celtic continued to press forward and were rewarded when Hooper volleyed in a cross from James Forrest. The comeback was completed in stoppage time, as substitute Georgios Samaras headed in Charlie Mulgrew's free kick.

Later in the day the Arsenal played Milan. Striker Marouane Chamakh made his home debut for the hosts having joined on a free transfer from Bordeaux earlier in the summer. Arsène Wenger also named defender Laurent Koscielny, who partnered stand-in captain Thomas Vermaelen in central defence. Midfielder Mathieu Flamini started against his former side. Arsenal began intently, and Vermaelen nearly broke the deadlock with a header on target in the 21st minute. Flamini's strike moments later forced Łukasz Fabiański to make a save. In spite of this, Arsenal largely dealt with Milan's threat in the first half. Chamakh scored the opening goal minutes before the interval, as he finished off Andrey Arshavin's cross. Alexandre Pato levelled the score in the second half, heading in Clarence Seedorf's free kick. Arsenal's Mark Randall and Milan's Gianluca Zambrotta had chances to win the match for their respective sides, but their shots went wide and the score remained 1–1 at the final whistle.

On the second and final day of the tournament, Milan took on Lyon. Despite a goalless first half, both sides enjoyed spells of possession and fashioned opportunities to score. The game energised after the break as Milan took the lead through Marco Borriello's goal. Jimmy Briand equalised for Lyon in the 79th minute, and the match ended all square. Arsenal versus Celtic was the day's late match. The hosts started strongly after Carlos Vela scored inside three minutes, and extended their lead just before half time when Bacary Sagna hit a shot from long distance. Samir Nasri made it 3–0 in the 51st minute, and despite Celtic's late rally, Arsenal ended 3–2 winners. Midfielder Jack Wilshere was picked out as Arsenal's key player for the game by The Guardian's match reporter Sachin Nakrani, who wrote: "During the first-half in particular, the 18-year-old was magnificent, showing a level of control and composure that defied belief given his youth. At times, Celtic's own midfielders could not get near the teenager as he glided through them."

== Standings ==
Each team played two matches, with three points awarded for a win, one point for a draw, and a point for every goal scored. Total shots on target over two days were used as a tiebreaker, if teams were tied on points, goal difference and goals scored.

Pos	Team	Pld	W	D	L	GF	GA	GD	Pts
1	Arsenal	2	1	1	0	4	3	+1	8
2	Lyon	2	0	2	0	3	3	0	5
3	Celtic	2	0	1	1	4	5	−1	5
4	Milan	2	0	2	0	2	2	0	4

== Matches ==
31 July 2010
14:00 BST

Celtic	2–2	Lyon
Hooper 82'; Samaras 89'	Report	Bastos 28'; Novillo 54'

Emirates Stadium, London
Attendance: 60,012
Referee: Ryuji Sato

31 July 2010
16:20 BST

Arsenal	1–1	Milan
Chamakh 36'	Report	Pato 77'

Emirates Stadium, London
Attendance: 60,012
Referee: Chris Foy

1 August 2010
14:00 BST

Milan	1–1	Lyon
Borriello 56'	Report	Briand 79'

Emirates Stadium, London
Attendance: 60,127
Referee: Minoru Tojo

1 August 2010
16:20 BST

Arsenal	3–2	Celtic
Vela 3'; Sagna 45'; Nasri 51'	Report	Murphy 72'; Ki 82'

Emirates Stadium, London
Attendance: 60,127
Referee: Andre Marriner

== Goalscorers ==
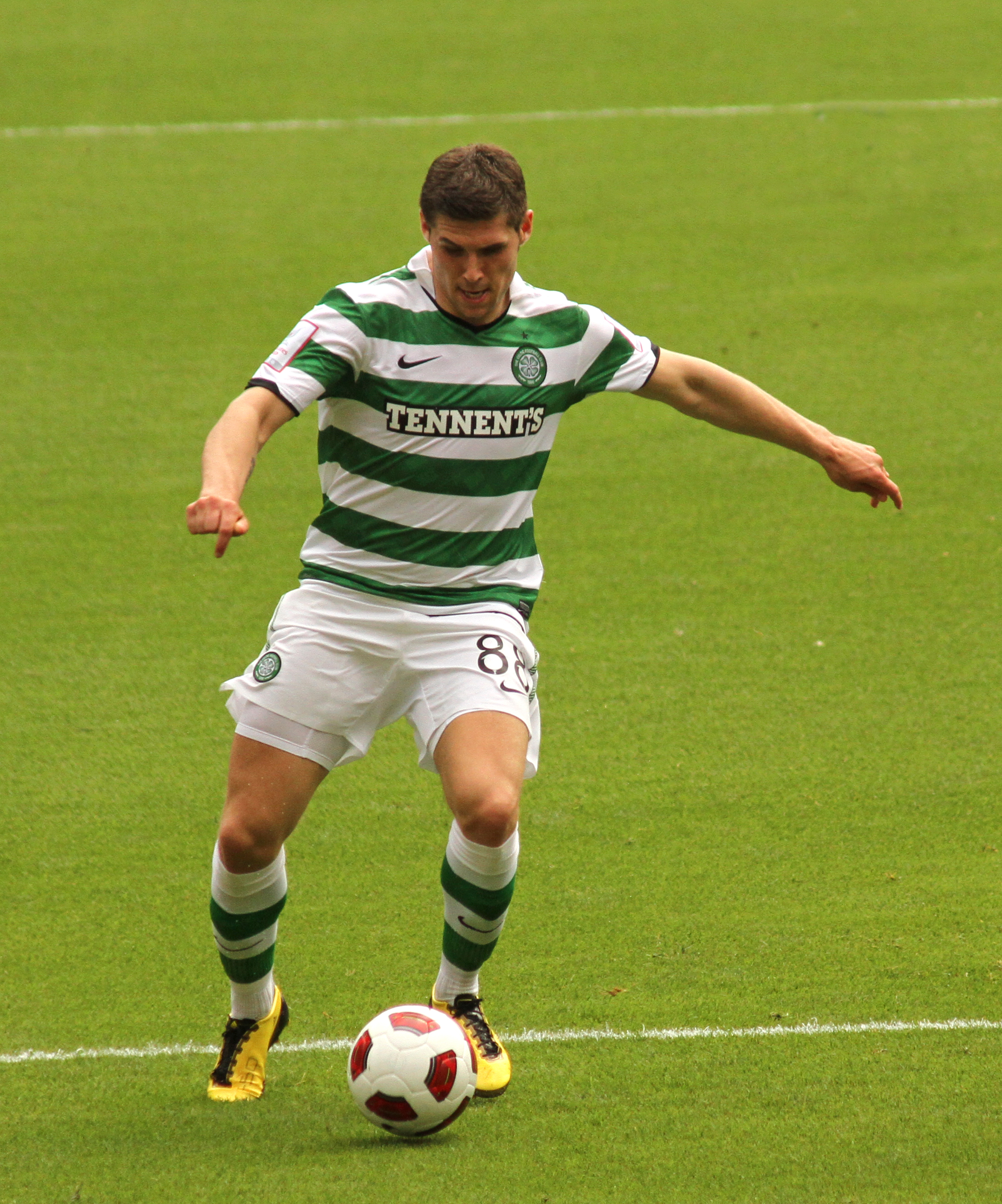
Gary Hooper scored on the opening day of the competition, against Lyon.

Rank	Name	Team	Goals
1	(Brazil) Michel Bastos	Lyon	1
1	(France) Harry Novillo	Lyon	1
1	(England) Gary Hooper	Celtic	1
1	(Greece) Georgios Samaras	Celtic	1
1	(Morocco) Marouane Chamakh	Arsenal	1
1	(Brazil) Alexandre Pato	Milan	1
1	(Italy) Marco Borriello	Milan	1
1	(France) Jimmy Briand	Lyon	1
1	(Mexico) Carlos Vela	Arsenal	1
1	(France) Bacary Sagna	Arsenal	1
1	(France) Samir Nasri	Arsenal	1
1	(Republic of Ireland) Daryl Murphy	Celtic	1
1	(South Korea) Ki Sung-Yeung	Celtic	1
