= Ivan Gazidis =

South African businessman (born 1964)

- Born: 13 September 1964 (age 62); Johannesburg, South Africa
- Citizenship: South African
- Education: University of Oxford
- Occupation: Football executive
- Employer: Kilmer Sports Ventures
- Title: President

Ivan Gazidis (born 13 September 1964) is a South African-Greek business executive and former footballer who is currently the President of Kilmer Sports Ventures and the president of Saint-Étienne. He previously held executive positions at Italian Serie A club AC Milan, Premier League club Arsenal, and the Major League Soccer.

== Early life and education ==
Gazidis was born on September 13, 1964 to an ethnically Greek family in Johannesburg, South Africa. At the age of 4, the Gazidis family moved to the United Kingdom where Gazidis would later attend independent Manchester Grammar School and St Edmund Hall at the University of Oxford. He was twice awarded a blue playing football against Cambridge in 1984 and 1985. He graduated with a degree in law in 1986 and in 1992 he moved to the United States to work for Latham & Watkins.

== Career ==
In 1994, he joined the founding management team of Major League Soccer, becoming in 2001 its deputy commissioner. He oversaw MLS's key strategic and business decisions and its marketing arm, Soccer United Marketing, of which he was president. He also helped promote the Mexican Football Federation and the CONCACAF Gold Cup.

In November 2008, Gazidis accepted the post of chief executive of Arsenal, a post he formally took up from 1 January 2009. He succeeded former managing director Keith Edelman and was expected to take over many of the roles formerly undertaken by ex-vice-chairman David Dein. In 2017–18, he oversaw significant personnel changes at the top of the club in preparation for then manager Arsene Wenger's departure, which was announced in April 2018. Gazidis spearheaded the search for a new manager, eventually hiring Unai Emery.

On 18 September 2018, Gazidis announced that he would be leaving Arsenal to join A.C. Milan. He took up the role on 1 December 2018. During January 2019 transfer window, he opted to terminate Gonzalo Higuain's loan deal six months in advance. He approved the transfers of Krzysztof Piątek and Lucas Paquetá, both carried out by Leonardo. In his first season as the club's CEO, the team finished fifth in Serie A, which was its best result in six years. And just two seasons after, the team finished second in 2020-2021 Serie A season; making them qualify to the UEFA Champions League for the first time since season 2012–2013. Gazidis left the club in the middle of the subsequent 2021–22 season, which A.C. Milan finished by winning the Serie A champions trophy for the first time in 11 years.

On 5 March 2024, Gazidis was appointed president of Kilmer Sports Ventures (KSV), a company within the Kilmer Group owned by Larry Tanenbaum. Following KSV's acquisition of Saint-Étienne on 3 June 2024, he also became president of the club. In both roles, he is supported by executive vice-presidents Huss Fahmy and Jaeson Rosenfeld, with whom he previously worked at Arsenal.

== Personal life ==
Gazidis is married and has two sons.
