= Keith Edelman =

British businessman

Keith Edelman (born June 1950) is an English businessman. He was managing director of Arsenal Football Club between 2000 and 2008.

== Biography ==
=== Business ===
Keith Edelman graduated from UMIST in 1971 with a BSc (Hons) in management sciences. He then worked for Rank Xerox, IBM and Fiat before joining Bank of America in 1978. Starting as planning manager, EMEA Division and then finance director, UK and Nordic Region, he eventually became managing director of Bank of America Finance.

In 1983, he joined Grand Metropolitan as a UK strategic director/director of finance, Foods Division. In 1985, he joined the Ladbroke Group as corporate planning director and completed the major acquisitions and disposals for the group; these included the acquisitions of Hilton International, Texas Homecare Plc, Thomson T Line Plc and Gable House Properties Plc. Following the acquisition of Hilton he became chair of Texas Homecare, a chain of DIY stores. In 1991, he left to become managing director of Carlton Communications and in 1993 group chief executive of Storehouse plc which included Mothercare and BHS.

He has also held a number of non-executive appointments, including Eurotunnel (Audit & Remuneration Committees 1994–2004), Haberdashers' Aske's School (governor 1994–2005), where he was a pupil from prep school through A Levels, include (director (charity) 1997–2001), Glenmorangie (chairman 2002–2005), Qualceram Shires plc (cirector 2005 to 2009) and Arnotts Holdings (2009–2010), chairman Goals Soccer Centres plc (2013–2016), senior independent director of Supergroup (2009–2018), non-executive director of Safestore (2009–2016), senior independent director of Thorntons Plc(2012–2015). Currently he is chairman Revolution Bars Group Plc, chairman Pennpetro Group plc, senior independent director Headlam Group Plc, non-executive chairman Altitude Group Plc and a director of the London Legacy Development Corporation.

=== Arsenal Football Club ===
In 2000, he joined Arsenal Football Club as managing director, bringing his financial and business experience to the club. Edelman, was responsible for all commercial and administrative activities at the club. In a period of increased commercialization of football he completed the first strategic partnership the club entered into since its formation, selling a 10 percent stake to Granada Media for £77 million. He has overseen the club's re-branding and crest redesign to limit copyright breaches, and was subsequently involved in a sponsorship deal with Nike, valued at £130 million over 10 years.

He was instrumental in the club's development of its new stadium and Keith Edelman arranged all the funding raising the £380 million of banking facilities. He also completed one of the largest football sponsorship deals with the airline Emirates for over £100 million, including naming rights to the Emirates Stadium. He opened the stadium in August 2006 both on time and on budget and set up all the operational aspects of the stadium that has made Emirates so successful. He signed a controversial sponsorship deal between the club and the Israeli Tourism Ministry, as Arsenal's main sponsor, Emirates, are the national carrier of Dubai (which does not have diplomatic ties with Israel) and do not fly to Israel. The club, however, denied any rift with Emirates stemming from the agreement. He oversaw the development of Highbury Square and pre sold over 90% of all units and brought the project in on time and on budget.

In 2007 Keith became club president of the Arsenal Ladies team, a position previously held by David Dein until he left Arsenal FC in April of that year. Edelman was always pragmatic about the club's future and did not rule out the club eventually going public or the major shareholders eventually deciding to sell their stakes. He resigned as a Director at Arsenal Holdings plc on 1 May 2008 and continued until May 2009 as a consultant.
