= 2019 Rosenborg BK season =

Rosenborg
2019 season
- Chairman: Ivar Koteng
- Coach: Eirik Horneland
- Stadium: Lerkendal Stadion
- Eliteserien: 3rd
- Norwegian Cup: Fourth round
- Champions League: Play-off round vs Dinamo Zagreb
- Europa League: Group stage
- Top goalscorer: League: Søderlund (8); All: Søderlund (13)
- Highest home attendance: 17 799 vs Haugesund (16 May)
- Lowest home attendance: 10 040 vs Sarpsborg 08 (5 May)
- Average home league attendance: 12 704 ▼22.6% (1 December)
Home colours	Away colours	Third colours

The 2019 season is Rosenborg's 40th consecutive year in the top flight now known as Eliteserien, their 52nd season in the top flight of Norwegian football. They will participate in Eliteserien, the Cup, the 2019 Mesterfinalen and the 2019-20 UEFA Champions League, entering at the First qualifying round stage. This will be Eirik Horneland's first season as Rosenborg manager after being appointed on January 3.

== Squad ==
Note: Flags indicate national team as defined under FIFA eligibility rules; some limited exceptions apply. Players may hold more than one non-FIFA nationality.

No.	Pos.	Nation	Player
1	GK	NOR	André Hansen
2	DF	NOR	Vegar Eggen Hedenstad
3	DF	NOR	Birger Meling
4	DF	NOR	Tore Reginiussen
5	MF	SRB	Đorđe Denić
7	MF	DEN	Mike Jensen (captain)
8	MF	NOR	Anders Konradsen
9	FW	DEN	Nicklas Bendtner
10	FW	NOR	Pål André Helland
11	FW	NOR	Yann-Erik de Lanlay
14	FW	NOR	Alexander Søderlund
15	MF	NOR	Anders Trondsen

No.	Pos.	Nation	Player
16	DF	NOR	Even Hovland
17	FW	NGA	David Akintola
19	DF	NOR	Gustav Valsvik
20	MF	NOR	Edvard Tagseth
22	MF	NOR	Gjermund Åsen
23	FW	NOR	Bjørn Maars Johnsen
24	GK	NOR	Arild Østbø
25	MF	NOR	Marius Lundemo
28	FW	NGA	Samuel Adegbenro
34	FW	NOR	Erik Botheim
35	FW	NOR	Emil Konradsen Ceide
37	MF	NOR	Mikael Tørset Johnsen

== Transfers ==
=== Winter ===
In: Note: Flags indicate national team as defined under FIFA eligibility rules; some limited exceptions apply. Players may hold more than one non-FIFA nationality.

No.	Pos.	Nation	Player
22	MF	NOR	Gjermund Åsen (from (Norway) Tromsø)
17	FW	NGA	David Akintola (on loan from (Denmark) Midtjylland)
19	DF	NOR	Gustav Valsvik (from (Germany) Eintracht Braunschweig)

Out: Note: Flags indicate national team as defined under FIFA eligibility rules; some limited exceptions apply. Players may hold more than one non-FIFA nationality.

No.	Pos.	Nation	Player
10	FW	ISL	Matthías Vilhjálmsson (to (Norway) Vålerenga)
17	FW	SWE	Jonathan Levi (on loan to (Sweden) Elfsborg)
19	FW	NOR	Andreas Helmersen (on loan to (Norway) Odd)
20	DF	AUS	Alex Gersbach (to (Netherlands) NAC Breda)
21	DF	NOR	Erlend Dahl Reitan (on loan to (Norway) Bodø/Glimt)
27	FW	TUN	Issam Jebali (to (Saudi Arabia) Al-Wehda)
33	GK	NOR	Julian Faye Lund (on loan to (Norway) Mjøndalen)
36	MF	NOR	Olaus Skarsem (on loan to (Norway) Ranheim)
—	DF	NOR	Torbjørn Lysaker Heggem (on loan to (Norway) Ranheim)
—	MF	NOR	Tobias Bjørnebye (on loan to (Norway) Hødd)
—	DF	DEN	Malte Amundsen (to (Denmark) Vejle)

=== Summer ===
In: Note: Flags indicate national team as defined under FIFA eligibility rules; some limited exceptions apply. Players may hold more than one non-FIFA nationality.

No.	Pos.	Nation	Player
20	MF	NOR	Edvard Tagseth (Free agent)
23	FW	NOR	Bjørn Maars Johnsen (on loan from (Netherlands) AZ)

Out: Note: Flags indicate national team as defined under FIFA eligibility rules; some limited exceptions apply. Players may hold more than one non-FIFA nationality.

No.	Pos.	Nation	Player
9	FW	DEN	Nicklas Bendtner (to (Denmark) FC København)
26	DF	BIH	Besim Šerbečić (on loan to (Bosnia and Herzegovina) Sarajevo)
30	DF	NGA	Igoh Ogbu (on loan to (Norway) Sogndal)

== Friendlies ==
16 February 2019	Rosenborg (Norway)	5–1	(Sweden) GIF Sundsvall	Malvik
17:00 UTC (UTC+1)	Hovland 2'; Helland 6'; Søderlund 12'; Akintola 36'; Adegbenro 71'	Summary	Hallenius 39'	Stadium: Abrahallen

28 February 2019	Ranheim (Norway)	1–0	(Norway) Rosenborg	Trondheim
17:00 UTC (UTC+1)	López 13'	Summary		Stadium: EXTRA Arena

10 March 2019	Brann (Norway)	1–0	(Norway) Rosenborg	Marbella, Spain
18:00 UTC (UTC+1)	Strand 44'

17 March 2019	Rosenborg (Norway)	0–1	(Norway) Molde	Malvik
16:00 UTC (UTC+1)		Summary	Knudtzon 7'	Stadium: Abrahallen

25 March 2019	IFK Norrköping (Sweden)	0–3	(Norway) Rosenborg	Norrköping
13:00 UTC (UTC+1)		Summary	Akintola 14'; Denić 19'; Helland 53'	Stadium: Nya Parken

10 June 2019	Rosenborg (Norway)	8–0	(Norway) Kolstad	Trondheim
18:00 UTC (UTC+1)	Søderlund 7', 21', 60', 69', 78'; Helland 53'; Adegbenro 67'; Engen Vik 80'	Summary		Stadium: Lerkendal Stadion

10 September 2019	Rosenborg (Norway)	7–0	(Norway) Strindheim	Trondheim
18:00 UTC (UTC+1)	Adegbenro 7', 43'; Maars Johnsen 10', 56'; Søderlund 32'; Hedenstad 42'; Botheim 71'	Summary		Stadium: Lerkendal Stadion

=== The Atlantic Cup ===
1 February 2019	Rosenborg (Norway)	0–2	(Czech Republic) Slavia Praha	Faro, Portugal
21:00 UTC (UTC+1)		Summary	Stoch 3'; Olayinka 49'	Stadium: Estádio Algarve; Attendance: 200

4 February 2019	AGF Aarhus (Denmark)	3–2	(Norway) Rosenborg	Faro, Portugal
20:00 UTC (UTC+1)	Sana 8'; Toutouh 52'; Mikanović 78'	Summary	Søderlund 19'; Hovland 87'	Stadium: Estádio Algarve; Attendance: 50

== Competitions ==
=== Eliteserien ===
==== Results summary ====
Overall								Home						Away					
Pld	W	D	L	GF	GA	GD	Pts	W	D	L	GF	GA	GD	W	D	L	GF	GA	GD
30	14	10	6	53	41	+12	52	11	3	1	34	16	+18	3	7	5	19	25	−6

Last updated: 1 December 2019.
Source: see below

==== Results by round ====
Round	1	2	3	4	5	6	7	8	9	10	11	12	13	14	15	16	17	18	19	20	21	22	23	24	25	26	27	28	29	30
Ground	A	H	A	H	A	H	A	H	H	A	H	A	H	A	H	A	H	A	H	A	H	A	H	A	A	H	A	H	A	H
Result	L	D	L	D	L	W	D	L	W	W	W	L	W	W	W	D	W	D	W	D	W	W	D	L	D	W	D	W	D	W
Position	14	13	15	15	16	15	15	15	12	11	9	9	8	7	5	6	5	4	4	4	4	4	4	4	4	4	4	4	4	3

Updated to match(es) played on 1 December 2019. Source: see below
A = Away; H = Home; W = Win; D = Draw; L = Loss

==== Results ====
31 March 2019 1	Bodø/Glimt	2–0	Rosenborg	Bodø
20:00 CEST (UTC+2)	Konradsen 43'; Saltnes (yellow card) 52'; Layouni 60'; Moberg (yellow card) 62'; Ricardo (yellow card) 65'	Summary	Jensen (yellow card) 44'; Bendtner (yellow card) 65'	Stadium: Aspmyra Stadion; Attendance: 2,793; Referee: Tom Harald Hagen

8 April 2019 2	Rosenborg	1–1	Odd	Trondheim
19:00 CEST (UTC+2)	Helland 44'	Summary	Semb Berge (yellow card) 14'; Ruud (yellow card) 34'; Børven 54'	Stadium: Lerkendal Stadion; Attendance: 11,723; Referee: Tommy Skjerven

14 April 2019 3	Stabæk	3–1	Rosenborg	Bærum
18:00 CEST (UTC+2)	Bohinen 29'; Brynhildsen 56'; Boli 67'	Summary	Søderlund (yellow card) 22'; Reginiussen 42'; Hovland (yellow card) 55'	Stadium: Nadderud Stadion; Attendance: 4,521; Referee: Trond Ivar Døvle

22 April 2019 4	Rosenborg	0–0	Strømsgodset	Trondheim
18:00 CEST (UTC+2)	Helland (yellow card) 73'	Summary	Mos (yellow card) 51'	Stadium: Lerkendal Stadion; Attendance: 11,367; Referee: Trygve Kjensli

28 April 2019 5	Molde	3–0	Rosenborg	Molde
20:00 CEST (UTC+2)	Gabrielsen 2'; Haraldseid (yellow card) 7'; Eikrem 13', 27'; Bjørnbak (yellow card) 82'; Moström (yellow card) 89'	Summary	Meling (yellow card) 88'	Stadium: Aker Stadion; Attendance: 9,010; Referee: Tore Hansen

5 May 2019 6	Rosenborg	1–0	Sarpsborg 08	Trondheim
20:00 CEST (UTC+2)	Trondsen (yellow card) 29'; Jensen 39'	Summary	Halvorsen (yellow card) 29'	Stadium: Lerkendal Stadion; Attendance: 10,040; Referee: Svein Oddvar Moen

11 May 2019 7	Lillestrøm	1–1	Rosenborg	Lillestrøm
18:00 CEST (UTC+2)	Gustavsson 23'; Sinyan (yellow card) 84'	Summary	Jensen 62'; Adegbenro (yellow card) 70'	Stadium: Åråsen Stadion; Attendance: 8,839; Referee: Rohit Saggi

16 May 2019 8	Rosenborg	0–2	Haugesund	Trondheim
18:00 CEST (UTC+2)	Lundemo 32'; Denić (yellow card) 62'	Summary	Grindheim 45'; Pallesen Knudsen 59'; Bruno Leite (yellow card) 88'	Stadium: Lerkendal Stadion; Attendance: 17,799; Referee: Trond Ivar Døvle

19 May 2019 9	Rosenborg	3–2	Mjøndalen	Trondheim
18:00 CEST (UTC+2)	Reginiussen 27' de Lanlay 30'; Søderlund 66'; Meling (yellow card) 84'; Helland (yellow card) 90'	Summary	Johansen (yellow card) 36'; Aasmundsen 39'; Brochmann 65'; Liseth (yellow card) 81'	Stadium: Lerkendal Stadion; Attendance: 13,038; Referee: Tom Harald Hagen

26 May 2019 10	Brann	0–1	Rosenborg	Bergen
20:00 CEST (UTC+2)		Report	Hedenstad (yellow card) 11'; Akintola 88'	Stadium: Brann Stadion; Attendance: 14,956; Referee: Tore Hansen

16 June 2019 11	Rosenborg	3–0	Vålerenga	Trondheim
20:00 CEST (UTC+2)	Adegbenro 14'; Reginiussen (yellow card) 36' de Lanlay 66'; Søderlund 86'	Summary	Bjørdal (yellow card) 57'; Abu (yellow card) 86'	Stadium: Lerkendal Stadion; Attendance: 13,320; Referee: Rohit Saggi

23 June 2019 12	Tromsø	1–0	Rosenborg	Tromsø
18:00 CEST (UTC+2)	Wangberg 65'; Andersen (yellow card) 74'; Pedersen (yellow card) 90'	Report	Hovland (yellow card) 50'; Søderlund (yellow card) 89'	Stadium: Alfheim Stadion; Attendance: 4,501; Referee: Tommy Skjerven

29 June 2019 13	Rosenborg	1–0	Kristiansund	Trondheim
18:00 CEST (UTC+2)	Lundemo (yellow card) 28'; Jensen 45' (pen.); Meling (yellow card) 84'; Åsen (yellow card) 90'	Summary	Coly (yellow card) 44'; D P Ulvestad (yellow card) 45'; P E Ulvestad (yellow card) 61'	Stadium: Lerkendal Stadion; Attendance: 13,522; Referee: Trond Ivar Døvle

4 July 2019 14	Ranheim	2–3	Rosenborg	Trondheim
20:00 CEST (UTC+2)	Hedenstad 44' (o.g.); Valla Dønnem (yellow card) 55'; Sollie Rønning 85'	Summary	Adegbenro 27'; Akintola 51'; Søderlund 88'	Stadium: EXTRA Arena; Attendance: 2,925; Referee: Svein Oddvar Moen

13 July 2019 15	Rosenborg	5–1	Viking	Trondheim
15:30 CEST (UTC+2)	Hedenstad 36'; Søderlund 40', 73'; Reginiussen (yellow card) 41'; Konradsen 50', 81'	Summary	Ekeland 44'; Friðjónsson (yellow card) 75'	Stadium: Lerkendal Stadion; Attendance: 12,659; Referee: Ola Hobber Nilsen

3 August 2019 16	Sarpsborg 08	1–1	Rosenborg	Sarpsborg
18:00 CEST (UTC+2)	Thomassen 3'; Lindseth (yellow card) 30'; Straalman (yellow card) 53'	Summary	Jensen 12'; Trondsen (yellow card) 67'; Meling (yellow card) 77'	Stadium: Sarpsborg Stadion; Attendance: 7,042; Referee: Rohit Saggi

10 August 2019 17	Rosenborg	5–2	Tromsø	Trondheim
15:30 CEST (UTC+2)	Botheim 11', 42', 64'; Valsvik 20'; Åsen 79'	Summary	Antonsen (yellow card) 31'; Taylor (penalty missed) 39'; Nilsen (yellow card) 49'; Pedersen 66' (yellow card) 69'	Stadium: Lerkendal Stadion; Attendance: 12,869; Referee: Tore Hansen

17 August 2019 18	Odd	1–1	Rosenborg	Skien
18:00 CEST (UTC+2)	Risa 10'; Semb Berge (yellow card) 44'; Rashani (yellow card) 83'	Summary	Trondsen (yellow card) 30'; Valsvik (yellow card) 45'; Hovland 60'; Meling (yellow card) 76'	Stadium: Skagerak Arena; Attendance: 7,218; Referee: Tommy Skjerven

24 August 2019 19	Rosenborg	3–2	Stabæk	Trondheim
18:00 CEST (UTC+2)	Søderlund 28'; Adegbenro 63'; Helland 75' (pen.) (yellow card) 86'	Summary	Meling 8' (o.g.); Sandberg (yellow card) 75'; Toutouh (yellow card) 77'; Junker 82'	Stadium: Lerkendal Stadion; Attendance: 12,298; Referee: Tom Harald Hagen

1 September 2019 20	Vålerenga	1–1	Rosenborg	Oslo
20:00 CEST (UTC+2)	Borchgrevink 60'; Vega (yellow card) 88'	Summary	Jensen (red card) 38'; Adegbenro (yellow card) 47'; Hedenstad 54' (yellow card) 77'; Konradsen (yellow card) 90'	Stadium: Intility Arena; Attendance: 11,101; Referee: Rohit Saggi

14 September 2019 21	Rosenborg	3–1	Lillestrøm	Trondheim
18:00 CEST (UTC+2)	Maars Johnsen 25', 59' (yellow card) 1'; Adegbenro 53'	Summary	Mathew (yellow card) 24'; Pedersen 65'; Krogstad (yellow card) 67'; Salquist (yellow card) 84'	Stadium: Lerkendal Stadion; Attendance: 12,183; Referee: Espen Eskås

22 September 2019 22	Mjøndalen	1–2	Rosenborg	Mjøndalen
20:00 CEST (UTC+2)	Occéan 6'	Summary	Søderlund 15' (pen.); Olsen Solberg 51' (o.g.); Lundemo (yellow card) 67'	Stadium: Consto Stadion; Attendance: 2,462; Referee: Ola Hobber Nilsen

28 September 2019 23	Rosenborg	0–0	Brann	Trondheim
20:00 CEST (UTC+2)	Meling (yellow card) 70'	Summary	Teniste (yellow card) 32'; Kristiansen (yellow card) 71'	Stadium: Lerkendal Stadion; Attendance: 12,578; Referee: Svein Oddvar Moen

6 October 2019 24	Haugesund	2–1	Rosenborg	Haugesund
18:00 CEST (UTC+2)	Bergqvist (yellow card) 15'; Grindheim (yellow card) 49'; Sandberg 56'; Samuelsen 85'	Summary	Lundemo (yellow card) 52'; Maars Johnsen 84'	Stadium: Haugesund Stadion; Attendance: 5,322; Referee: Trond Ivar Døvle

19 October 2019 25	Kristiansund	2–2	Rosenborg	Kristiansund
18:00 CEST (UTC+2)	Gjertsen 43'; Psyché 84'	Summary	Akintola 21'; Maars Johnsen 56'; Hovland (yellow card) 88'	Stadium: Kristiansund Stadion; Attendance: 4,444; Referee: Svein Oddvar Moen

27 October 2019 26	Rosenborg	3–1	Molde	Trondheim
20:00 CET (UTC+1)	Søderlund (yellow card) 24' (yellow-red card) 45'; Akintola 35'; Hovland 41'; Jensen (yellow card) 57'; Maars Johnsen 83'	Summary	Omoijuanfo 13'; Ellingsen (yellow card) 65'; Hussain 90'	Stadium: Lerkendal Stadion; Attendance: 14,093; Referee: Tom Harald Hagen

1 November 2019 27	Strømsgodset	3–3	Rosenborg	Drammen
19:00 CEST (UTC+2)	Maigaard 20' (pen.); Keita 53'; Sætra 90+1'	Summary	Hovland 16'; Jensen 73' (pen.); Glesnes 88' (o.g.)	Stadium: Marienlyst Stadion; Attendance: 5,457; Referee: Svein Oddvar Moen

10 November 2019 28	Rosenborg	3–2	Bodø/Glimt	Trondheim
20:00 CET (UTC+1)	Reginiussen 17' (yellow card) 79'; Helland 72' (pen.) (yellow card) 90'; Hedenstad (yellow card) 57'; Søderlund (yellow card) 78'; Lundemo 90+5'	Summary	Hauge 27' (pen.), 33'; Konradsen (yellow card) 72'; Ricardo (yellow card) 77'	Stadium: Lerkendal Stadion; Attendance: 12,039; Referee: Espen Eskås

24 November 2019 29	Viking	2–2	Rosenborg	Stavanger
18:00 CET (UTC+1)	Furdal 14'; Källman 43'; Tripić (yellow card) 90+4'	Summary	Hedenstad (yellow card) 34'; Akintola 36'; Søderlund 52'; Adegbenro (yellow card) 62'; Reginiussen (yellow card) 90+4'	Stadium: Viking Stadion; Attendance: 13,540; Referee: Tore Hansen

1 December 2019 30	Rosenborg	3–2	Ranheim	Trondheim
18:00 CET (UTC+1)	Trondsen (yellow card) 42'; Hovland 58', 76'; Adegbenro 81'; Meling (yellow card) 90'; Jensen (penalty missed)	Summary	Alseth 21'; Barli (yellow card) 45+4'; Karlsen 77' (yellow card) 77'	Stadium: Lerkendal Stadion; Attendance: 11,026; Referee: Trond Ivar Døvle

==== Table ====
Pos	Team	Pld	W	D	L	GF	GA	GD	Pts	Qualification or relegation
1	Molde (C)	30	21	5	4	72	31	+41	68	Qualification for the Champions League first qualifying round
2	Bodø/Glimt	30	15	9	6	64	44	+20	54	Qualification for the Europa League first qualifying round
3	Rosenborg	30	14	10	6	53	41	+12	52	Qualification for the Europa League first qualifying round
4	Odd	30	15	7	8	45	40	+5	52	
5	Viking	30	13	8	9	55	42	+13	47	Qualification for the Europa League second qualifying round (Note: Viking qualified for the Europa League second qualifying round as winners of the 2019 Norwegian Cup.)

Source: Football Association of Norway (in Norwegian), Soccerway
Rules for classification: 1) Points; 2) Goal difference; 3) Goals scored; 4) Head-to-head points; 5) Head-to-head goal difference; 6) Head-to-head away goals scored (only if between two teams); 7) Head-to-head goals scored; 8) Play-off (only used to decide champions or relegation).
(C) Champions

=== Norwegian Cup ===
1 May 2019 First Round	Rørvik	1–3	Rosenborg	Rørvik
16:00 CEST (UTC+2)	Fausa 30'; Denner Oliveria (yellow card) 88'	Summary	Valsvik 4'; Konradsen 52'; Botheim 59'	Stadium: Rørvik kunstgress Referee: Mathias Støfringshaug

22 May 2019 Second Round	Tiller	0–3	Rosenborg	Trondheim
18:00 CEST (UTC+2)	Johnsen (yellow card) 56'; Killinberg (yellow card) 71'	Summary	Botheim 57'; Meling 62'; Åsen 87'	Stadium: Tonstad Kunstgress; Attendance: 2,512; Referee: Robert Eggen

19 June 2019 Third Round	Ull/Kisa	1–2 (a.e.t.)	Rosenborg	Jessheim
18:00 CEST (UTC+2)	Langås 65'	Summary	Akintola 72'; Adegbenro 102'; Konradsen (red card) 120'	Stadium: UKI Arena; Attendance: 3,435; Referee: Trygve Kjensli

26 June 2019 Fourth Round	Rosenborg	1–1 (a.e.t.) (4–5 p)	Aalesund	Trondheim
20:00 CEST (UTC+2)	Helland (red card) 33'; Reginiussen 82'	Summary	Ólafsson (yellow card) 9' (yellow-red card) 45'; Castro 35'; Uzochukwu (yellow card) 52'	Stadium: Lerkendal Stadion; Attendance: 5,122; Referee: Ola Hobber Nilsen
	Penalties
	Jensen (penalty scored); Hovland (penalty scored); Søderlund (penalty missed); Meling (penalty scored); Akintola (penalty scored)		Carlsen (penalty scored); Meade (penalty scored); Lie (penalty scored); Steen Sæthre (penalty scored); Friðjónsson (penalty scored)

=== Mesterfinalen ===
Cancelled Final	Rosenborg	–	Molde	Oslo
??:?? CET (UTC+1)				Stadium: Ullevaal Stadion

=== Champions League ===
==== Qualifying phase ====
10 July 2019 1st qualifying round 1st leg	Linfield (Northern Ireland)	0–2	(Norway) Rosenborg	Belfast, Northern Ireland
20:45 CEST (UTC+2)	Stafford (yellow card) 34'; Stewart (yellow card) 60'; Mulgrew (yellow card) 67'; Lavery (yellow card) 72'; Waterworth (yellow card) 90'	Summary	Jensen 22'; Lundemo (yellow card) 37'; Søderlund 69' (yellow card) 90'; Trondsen (yellow card) 84'	Stadium: Windsor Park; Referee: Ivaylo Stoyanov (Bulgaria)

17 July 2019 1st qualifying round 2nd leg	Rosenborg (Norway)	4–0 (6–0 agg.)	(Northern Ireland) Linfield	Trondheim
20:00 CEST (UTC+2)	Konradsen 20', 51'; Akintola 69'; Helland 85'	Summary	Casement (yellow card) 39'; Mulgrew (yellow card) 42'; Larkin (yellow card) 63'	Stadium: Lerkendal Stadion; Attendance: 11,904; Referee: Enea Jorgji (Albania)

24 July 2019 2nd qualifying round 1st leg	BATE (Belarus)	2–1	(Norway) Rosenborg	Barysaw, Belarus
19:00 CEST (UTC+2)	Stasevich 5', pen.' Simović (yellow card) 22'; Skavysh 51'	Summary	Søderlund (yellow card) 5'; Hedenstad (yellow card) 13'; Konradsen 25'	Stadium: Borisov Arena; Referee: Sandro Schärer (Switzerland)

31 July 2019 2nd qualifying round 2nd leg	Rosenborg (Norway)	2–0 (3–2 agg.)	(Belarus) BATE	Trondheim
19:00 CEST (UTC+2)	Konradsen (yellow card) 38'; Helland 73', pen' (yellow card) 81'; Søderlund 85'	Summary	Rios (yellow card) 52'; Jonassen (yellow card) 72'; Moukam (yellow card) 85'	Stadium: Lerkendal Stadion; Attendance: 14,875; Referee: Marco Di Bello (Italy)

7 August 2019 3rd qualifying round 1st leg	Maribor (Slovenia)	1–3	(Norway) Rosenborg	Maribor, Slovenia
20:15 CEST (UTC+2)	Milec (yellow card) 6'; Pihler (yellow card) 49'; Tavares 70'	Summary	Adegbenro (yellow card) 23'; Søderlund 50', 63'; Jensen 71' (yellow card) 89'	Stadium: Ljudski vrt Referee: François Letexier (France)

13 August 2019 3rd qualifying round 2nd leg	Rosenborg (Norway)	3–1 (6–2 agg.)	(Slovenia) Maribor	Trondheim
19:00 CEST (UTC+2)	Lundemo (yellow card) 17'; Konradsen (yellow card) 39' (goal) 61', 81'; Søderlund 53'	Summary	Požeg Vancaš 45'	Stadium: Lerkendal Stadion; Attendance: 18,564; Referee: Serdar Gözübüyük (Netherlands)

21 August 2019 Play-off round 1st leg	Dinamo Zagreb (Croatia)	2–0	(Norway) Rosenborg	Zagreb, Croatia
21:00 CEST (UTC+2)	Petković 8' (pen.); Moro (yellow card) 25'; Oršić 28'; Stojanović (yellow card) 75'	Summary	Hovland (yellow card) 26'; Meling (yellow card) 90'	Stadium: Stadion Maksimir; Attendance: 23,859; Referee: Daniele Orsato (Italy)

27 August 2019 Play-off round 2nd leg	Rosenborg (Norway)	1–1 (1–3 agg.)	(Croatia) Dinamo Zagreb	Trondheim
21:00 CEST (UTC+2)	Akintola 11'; Søderlund (yellow card) 47'	Summary	Dilaver (yellow card) 43'; Gojak 71'; Leovac (yellow card) 84'	Stadium: Lerkendal Stadion; Attendance: 18,173; Referee: Ovidiu Hațegan (Romania)

=== UEFA Europa League ===
==== Group stage ====
Pos	Team	Pld	W	D	L	GF	GA	GD	Pts	Qualification	LASK	SPO	PSV	ROS
1	(Austria) LASK	6	4	1	1	11	4	+7	13	Advance to knockout phase	—	3–0	4–1	1–0
2	(Portugal) Sporting CP	6	4	0	2	11	7	+4	12	Advance to knockout phase	2–1	—	4–0	1–0
3	(Netherlands) PSV Eindhoven	6	2	2	2	9	12	−3	8		0–0	3–2	—	1–1
4	(Norway) Rosenborg	6	0	1	5	3	11	−8	1		1–2	0–2	1–4	—

Source: UEFA
Rules for classification: Group stage tiebreakers

19 September 2019 1	LASK (Austria)	1–0	(Norway) Rosenborg	Linz, Austria
18:55 CEST (UTC+2)	Renner (yellow card) 26'; Michorl 45'; Filipovic (yellow card) 54'	Summary	Hedenstad (yellow card) 44'; Meling (yellow card) 56'; Hovland (yellow card) 84'	Stadium: Linzer Stadion; Attendance: 12,179; Referee: Donatas Rumšas (Lithuania)

3 October 2019 2	Rosenborg (Norway)	1–4	(Netherlands) PSV Eindhoven	Trondheim
21:00 CEST (UTC+2)	Adegbenro 70'	Summary	Rosario 14'; Meling 38' (o.g.); Malen 41', 79'; Sadílek (yellow card) 80'	Stadium: Lerkendal Stadion; Attendance: 10,296; Referee: Halil Umut Meler (Turkey)

24 October 2019 3	Sporting CP (Portugal)	1–0	(Norway) Rosenborg	Lisbon, Portugal
21:00 CEST (UTC+2)	Coates (yellow card) 36'; Vietto (yellow card) 64'; Bolasie 70'; Rosier (yellow card) 75'	Summary	Helland (yellow card) 90+2'; Jensen (yellow card) 90+3'	Stadium: Estádio José Alvalade; Attendance: 27,671; Referee: Lawrence Visser (Belgium)

7 November 2019 4	Rosenborg (Norway)	0–2	(Portugal) Sporting CP	Trondheim
18:55 CET (UTC+1)			Coates 16'; Neto (yellow card) 26'; Fernandes 38'; Eduardo (yellow card) 59'	Stadium: Lerkendal Stadion; Attendance: 11,018; Referee: Kevin Clancy (Scotland)

28 November 2019 5	Rosenborg (Norway)	1–2	(Austria) LASK	Trondheim
21:00 CET (UTC+1)	Johnsen 45', (yellow card) 57'	Summary	Goiginger 20'; Frieser 54'	Stadium: Lerkendal Stadion; Attendance: 9,775; Referee: Giorgi Kruashvili (Georgia)

12 December 2019 6	PSV Eindhoven (Netherlands)	1–1	(Norway) Rosenborg	Eindhoven, Netherlands
18:55 CET (UTC+1)	Ihattaren 63'; Malen (yellow card) 90+5'	Summary	Helland 22'; Meling (yellow card) 59'; Reginiussen (yellow card) 80'	Stadium: Philips Stadion; Attendance: 24,000; Referee: Vitali Meshkov (Russia)

== Squad statistics ==
=== Appearances and goals ===
As of match played 12 December 2019

No.	Pos	Nat	Player	Total		Eliteserien		Norwegian Cup		Mesterfinalen		Champions League		Europa League	
No.	Pos	Nat	Player	Apps	Goals	Apps	Goals	Apps	Goals	Apps	Goals	Apps	Goals	Apps	Goals
1	GK	(Norway) NOR	André Hansen	42	0	28+0	0	1+0	0	0+0	0	8+0	0	5+0	0
2	DF	(Norway) NOR	Vegar Eggen Hedenstad	44	2	27+0	2	4+0	0	0+0	0	8+0	0	5+0	0
3	DF	(Norway) NOR	Birger Meling	44	1	28+0	0	2+0	1	0+0	0	8+0	0	6+0	0
4	DF	(Norway) NOR	Tore Reginiussen	39	4	25+0	3	2+0	1	0+0	0	8+0	0	4+0	0
5	MF	(Serbia) SRB	Đorđe Denić	13	0	6+3	0	2+2	0	0+0	0	0+0	0	0+0	0
7	MF	(Denmark) DEN	Mike Jensen	43	7	27+0	5	3+0	0	0+0	0	7+0	2	6+0	0
8	MF	(Norway) NOR	Anders Konradsen	33	8	15+5	2	3+0	1	0+0	0	7+0	5	1+2	0
10	FW	(Norway) NOR	Pål André Helland	29	6	9+9	3	2+0	0	0+0	0	1+5	2	1+2	1
11	FW	(Norway) NOR	Yann-Erik de Lanlay	23	2	10+7	2	1+0	0	0+0	0	2+3	0	0+0	0
14	MF	(Norway) NOR	Alexander Søderlund	43	13	23+5	8	2+0	0	0+0	0	8+0	5	4+1	0
15	MF	(Norway) NOR	Anders Trondsen	36	0	14+8	0	2+1	0	0+0	0	1+5	0	4+1	0
16	DF	(Norway) NOR	Even Hovland	45	5	28+0	5	3+0	0	0+0	0	8+0	0	6+0	0
17	FW	(Nigeria) NGA	David Akintola	36	8	16+5	5	4+0	1	0+0	0	7+1	2	3+0	0
19	DF	(Norway) NOR	Gustav Valsvik	20	2	10+3	1	3+1	1	0+0	0	0+1	0	2+0	0
20	MF	(Norway) NOR	Edvard Tagseth	3	0	1+0	0	0+0	0	0+0	0	0+0	0	1+1	0
22	MF	(Norway) NOR	Gjermund Åsen	35	2	14+9	1	1+2	1	0+0	0	3+1	0	3+2	0
23	FW	(Norway) NOR	Bjørn Maars Johnsen	16	6	4+7	5	0+0	0	0+0	0	0+0	0	3+2	1
24	GK	(Norway) NOR	Arild Østbø	5	0	1+0	0	3+0	0	0+0	0	0+0	0	1+0	0
25	MF	(Norway) NOR	Marius Lundemo	36	1	17+5	1	1+0	0	0+0	0	7+0	0	5+1	0
28	FW	(Nigeria) NGA	Samuel Adegbenro	35	7	18+2	5	1+2	1	0+0	0	5+1	0	6+0	1
34	FW	(Norway) NOR	Erik Botheim	12	5	4+3	3	2+1	2	0+0	0	0+0	0	0+2	0
35	FW	(Norway) NOR	Emil Konradsen Ceide	16	0	3+6	0	1+1	0	0+0	0	0+3	0	0+2	0
36	DF	(Norway) NOR	Sondre Skogen	0	0	0+0	0	0+0	0	0+0	0	0+0	0	0+0	0
37	MF	(Norway) NOR	Mikael Tørset Johnsen	6	0	0+2	0	1+2	0	0+0	0	0+0	0	0+1	0
40	GK	(Norway) NOR	Rasmus Semundseth Sandberg	0	0	0+0	0	0+0	0	0+0	0	0+0	0	0+0	0
Players away from Rosenborg on loan:
17	FW	(Sweden) SWE	Jonathan Levi	0	0	0+0	0	0+0	0	0+0	0	0+0	0	0+0	0
19	FW	(Norway) NOR	Andreas Helmersen	0	0	0+0	0	0+0	0	0+0	0	0+0	0	0+0	0
21	DF	(Norway) NOR	Erlend Dahl Reitan	0	0	0+0	0	0+0	0	0+0	0	0+0	0	0+0	0
26	DF	(Bosnia and Herzegovina) BIH	Besim Šerbečić	0	0	0+0	0	0+0	0	0+0	0	0+0	0	0+0	0
30	DF	(Nigeria) NGA	Igoh Ogbu	1	0	0+0	0	0+1	0	0+0	0	0+0	0	0+0	0
33	GK	(Norway) NOR	Julian Faye Lund	0	0	0+0	0	0+0	0	0+0	0	0+0	0	0+0	0
36	MF	(Norway) NOR	Olaus Skarsem	0	0	0+0	0	0+0	0	0+0	0	0+0	0	0+0	0
	DF	(Norway) NOR	Torbjørn Lysaker Heggem	0	0	0+0	0	0+0	0	0+0	0	0+0	0	0+0	0
	MF	(Norway) NOR	Tobias Bjørnebye	0	0	0+0	0	0+0	0	0+0	0	0+0	0	0+0	0
Players who appeared for Rosenborg no longer at the club:
9	FW	(Denmark) DEN	Nicklas Bendtner	5	0	2+3	0	0+0	0	0+0	0	0+0	0	0+0	0
10	FW	(Iceland) ISL	Matthías Vilhjálmsson	0	0	0+0	0	0+0	0	0+0	0	0+0	0	0+0	0
20	DF	(Australia) AUS	Alex Gersbach	0	0	0+0	0	0+0	0	0+0	0	0+0	0	0+0	0
27	FW	(Tunisia) TUN	Issam Jebali	0	0	0+0	0	0+0	0	0+0	0	0+0	0	0+0	0
	DF	(Denmark) DEN	Malte Amundsen	0	0	0+0	0	0+0	0	0+0	0	0+0	0	0+0	0

=== Disciplinary record ===
As of match played 12 December 2019

Number	Nation	Position	Name	Eliteserien		Norwegian Cup		Mesterfinalen		Champions League		Europa League		Total	
Number	Nation	Position	Name	Booked	Sent off (straight red)	Booked	Sent off (straight red)	Booked	Sent off (straight red)	Booked	Sent off (straight red)	Booked	Sent off (straight red)	Booked	Sent off (straight red)
1	(Norway)	GK	André Hansen	0	0	0	0	0	0	0	0	0	0	0	0
2	(Norway)	DF	Vegar Eggen Hedenstad	4	0	0	0	0	0	1	0	1	0	6	0
3	(Norway)	DF	Birger Meling	7	0	0	0	0	0	1	0	2	0	10	0
4	(Norway)	DF	Tore Reginiussen	4	0	0	0	0	0	0	0	1	0	5	0
5	(Serbia)	MF	Đorđe Denić	1	0	0	0	0	0	0	0	0	0	1	0
7	(Denmark)	MF	Mike Jensen	2	1	0	0	0	0	1	0	1	0	4	1
8	(Norway)	MF	Anders Konradsen	1	0	0	1	0	0	2	0	0	0	3	1
10	(Norway)	FW	Pål André Helland	4	0	0	1	0	0	1	0	1	0	6	1
11	(Norway)	FW	Yann-Erik de Lanlay	0	0	0	0	0	0	0	0	0	0	0	0
14	(Norway)	MF	Alexander Søderlund	3	1	0	0	0	0	3	0	0	0	6	1
15	(Norway)	MF	Anders Trondsen	4	0	0	0	0	0	1	0	0	0	5	0
16	(Norway)	DF	Even Hovland	3	0	0	0	0	0	1	0	1	0	5	0
17	(Nigeria)	FW	David Akintola	0	0	0	0	0	0	0	0	0	0	0	0
19	(Norway)	DF	Gustav Valsvik	1	0	0	0	0	0	0	0	0	0	1	0
20	(Norway)	MF	Edvard Tagseth	0	0	0	0	0	0	0	0	0	0	0	0
22	(Norway)	MF	Gjermund Åsen	1	0	0	0	0	0	0	0	0	0	1	0
23	(Norway)	FW	Bjørn Maars Johnsen	1	0	0	0	0	0	0	0	1	0	2	0
24	(Norway)	GK	Arild Østbø	0	0	0	0	0	0	0	0	0	0	0	0
25	(Norway)	MF	Marius Lundemo	4	0	0	0	0	0	2	0	0	0	6	0
28	(Nigeria)	FW	Samuel Adegbenro	3	0	0	0	0	0	1	0	0	0	4	0
34	(Norway)	FW	Erik Botheim	0	0	0	0	0	0	0	0	0	0	0	0
35	(Norway)	FW	Emil Konradsen Ceide	0	0	0	0	0	0	0	0	0	0	0	0
36	(Norway)	DF	Sondre Skogen	0	0	0	0	0	0	0	0	0	0	0	0
37	(Norway)	MF	Mikael Tørset Johnsen	0	0	0	0	0	0	0	0	0	0	0	0
40	(Norway)	GK	Rasmus Semundseth Sandberg	0	0	0	0	0	0	0	0	0	0	0	0
Players away from Rosenborg on loan:
17	(Sweden)	FW	Jonathan Levi	0	0	0	0	0	0	0	0	0	0	0	0
19	(Norway)	FW	Andreas Helmersen	0	0	0	0	0	0	0	0	0	0	0	0
21	(Norway)	DF	Erlend Dahl Reitan	0	0	0	0	0	0	0	0	0	0	0	0
26	(Bosnia and Herzegovina)	DF	Besim Šerbečić	0	0	0	0	0	0	0	0	0	0	0	0
30	(Nigeria)	DF	Igoh Ogbu	0	0	0	0	0	0	0	0	0	0	0	0
33	(Norway)	GK	Julian Faye Lund	0	0	0	0	0	0	0	0	0	0	0	0
36	(Norway)	MF	Olaus Skarsem	0	0	0	0	0	0	0	0	0	0	0	0
	(Norway)	DF	Torbjørn Lysaker Heggem	0	0	0	0	0	0	0	0	0	0	0	0
Players who appeared for Rosenborg no longer at the club:
9	(Denmark)	FW	Nicklas Bendtner	1	0	0	0	0	0	0	0	0	0	1	0
10	(Iceland)	FW	Matthías Vilhjálmsson	0	0	0	0	0	0	0	0	0	0	0	0
20	(Australia)	DF	Alex Gersbach	0	0	0	0	0	0	0	0	0	0	0	0
27	(Tunisia)	FW	Issam Jebali	0	0	0	0	0	0	0	0	0	0	0	0
	(Denmark)	DF	Malte Amundsen	0	0	0	0	0	0	0	0	0	0	0	0
			TOTALS	44	2	0	2	0	0	14	0	8	0	66	4

== See also ==
- Rosenborg BK seasons
