= 2018 Rosenborg BK season =

Rosenborg
2018 season
- Chairman: Ivar Koteng
- Coach: Kåre Ingebrigtsen (before 19 July 2018); Rini Coolen (after 19 July 2018)
- Stadium: Lerkendal Stadion
- Eliteserien: 1st
- Norwegian Cup: Winner
- Champions League: Second qualifying round vs Celtic
- Europa League: Group stage
- Top goalscorer: League: Søderlund (8); All: Søderlund (14)
- Highest home attendance: 21 201 vs Ranheim (5 May)
- Lowest home attendance: 13 668 vs Sarpsborg 08 (23 September)
- Average home league attendance: 16 424 ▼6.6% (24 November)
Home colours	Away colours	Third colours

The 2018 season is Rosenborg's 39th consecutive year in the top flight now known as Eliteserien, their 51st season in the top flight of Norwegian football. They will participate in Eliteserien, the Cup, the 2018 Mesterfinalen and the 2018-19 UEFA Champions League, entering at the First qualifying round stage. Kåre Ingebrigtsen started the season as manager but the club decided to remove him from the job after 4 years on July 19 and made Head of the academy Rini Coolen the manager.

== Squad ==
Note: Flags indicate national team as defined under FIFA eligibility rules; some limited exceptions apply. Players may hold more than one non-FIFA nationality.

No.	Pos.	Nation	Player
1	GK	NOR	André Hansen
2	DF	NOR	Vegar Eggen Hedenstad
3	DF	NOR	Birger Meling
4	DF	NOR	Tore Reginiussen
5	MF	SRB	Đorđe Denić
7	MF	DEN	Mike Jensen (captain)
8	MF	NOR	Anders Konradsen
9	FW	DEN	Nicklas Bendtner
10	FW	ISL	Matthías Vilhjálmsson
11	FW	NOR	Yann-Erik de Lanlay
14	FW	NOR	Alexander Søderlund
15	MF	NOR	Anders Trondsen
16	DF	NOR	Even Hovland

No.	Pos.	Nation	Player
17	MF	SWE	Jonathan Levi
20	DF	AUS	Alex Gersbach
21	DF	NOR	Erlend Dahl Reitan
23	FW	NOR	Pål André Helland
24	GK	NOR	Arild Østbø
25	MF	NOR	Marius Lundemo
26	DF	BIH	Besim Šerbečić
27	FW	TUN	Issam Jebali
28	FW	NGA	Samuel Adegbenro
30	DF	NGA	Igoh Ogbu
34	FW	NOR	Erik Botheim
36	MF	NOR	Olaus Skarsem

== Transfers ==
=== Winter ===
In: Note: Flags indicate national team as defined under FIFA eligibility rules; some limited exceptions apply. Players may hold more than one non-FIFA nationality.

No.	Pos.	Nation	Player
14	FW	NOR	Alexander Søderlund (from (France) Saint-Ètienne)
16	DF	NOR	Even Hovland (from (Norway) Sogndal)
20	DF	DEN	Malte Amundsen (from (Denmark) HB Køge)
26	DF	BIH	Besim Šerbečić (from (Bosnia and Herzegovina) Radnik Bijeljina)
27	FW	NOR	Rafik Zekhnini (on loan from (Italy) Fiorentina)
30	DF	NGA	Igoh Ogbu (from (Nigeria) Gombe United)

Out: Note: Flags indicate national team as defined under FIFA eligibility rules; some limited exceptions apply. Players may hold more than one non-FIFA nationality.

No.	Pos.	Nation	Player
14	DF	NOR	Johan Lædre Bjørdal (Free agent)
16	DF	NOR	Jørgen Skjelvik (to (United States) LA Galaxy)
19	FW	NOR	Andreas Helmersen (on loan to (Norway) Ranheim)
20	DF	AUS	Alex Gersbach (on loan to (France) Lens)
26	FW	SRB	Milan Jevtović (loan return to (Turkey) Antalyaspor)
30	DF	NGA	Igoh Ogbu (on loan to (Norway) Levanger)
33	GK	NOR	Julian Faye Lund (on loan to (Norway) Levanger)
—	MF	NOR	Sivert Solli (to (Norway) Ranheim)

=== Summer ===
In: Note: Flags indicate national team as defined under FIFA eligibility rules; some limited exceptions apply. Players may hold more than one non-FIFA nationality.

No.	Pos.	Nation	Player
5	MF	SRB	Đorđe Denić (from (Serbia) Rad)
20	DF	AUS	Alex Gersbach (loan return from (France) Lens)
27	FW	TUN	Issam Jebali (from (Sweden) Elfsborg)
30	DF	NGA	Igoh Ogbu (loan return from (Norway) Levanger)

Out: Note: Flags indicate national team as defined under FIFA eligibility rules; some limited exceptions apply. Players may hold more than one non-FIFA nationality.

No.	Pos.	Nation	Player
5	DF	DEN	Jacob Rasmussen (to (Italy) Empoli)
18	MF	NOR	Magnus Stamnestrø (to (Norway) Ranheim)
20	DF	DEN	Malte Amundsen (on loan to (Germany) Eintracht Braunschweig)
22	MF	NOR	Morten Konradsen (to (Norway) Bodø/Glimt)
27	FW	NOR	Rafik Zekhnini (loan return to (Italy) Fiorentina)

== Competitions ==
=== Eliteserien ===
==== Results summary ====
Overall								Home						Away					
Pld	W	D	L	GF	GA	GD	Pts	W	D	L	GF	GA	GD	W	D	L	GF	GA	GD
30	19	7	4	51	24	+27	64	9	5	1	32	14	+18	10	2	3	19	10	+9

Last updated: 24 November 2018.
Source: see below

==== Results by round ====
Round	1	2	3	4	5	6	7	8	9	10	11	12	13	14	15	16	17	18	19	20	21	22	23	24	25	26	27	28	29	30
Ground	A	H	A	H	A	H	A	H	A	H	A	H	A	H	A	H	A	H	A	H	H	A	H	A	H	A	A	H	A	H
Result	L	D	D	W	W	W	W	D	W	W	W	L	L	W	W	W	W	D	W	W	W	W	W	L	D	D	W	W	W	D
Position	12	11	12	8	6	4	2	2	2	2	2	2	3	2	2	2	2	2	2	1	1	1	1	1	1	1	1	1	1	1

Updated to match(es) played on 24 November 2018. Source: see below
A = Away; H = Home; W = Win; D = Draw; L = Loss

==== Results ====
11 March 2018 1	Sarpsborg 08	1–0	Rosenborg	Sarpsborg
20:00 CET (UTC+1)	Lund Nielsen (yellow card) 14'; Zachariassen 69'; Singh (yellow card) 78'; Schwartz (yellow card) 90'	Summary	Konradsen (yellow card) 21'; Hedenstad (yellow card) 77'	Stadium: Sarpsborg Stadion; Attendance: 5,201; Referee: Svein Oddvar Moen

17 March 2018 2	Rosenborg	2–2	Kristiansund	Trondheim
18:00 CET (UTC+1)	Adegbenro 51'; Konradsen 53'	Summary	Bamba 11'; Sørmo (yellow card) 25'; Hopmark (yellow card) 53'; Bye 80'; Rønningen (yellow card) 90'; McDermott (yellow card) 90'	Stadium: Lerkendal Stadion; Attendance: 14,285; Referee: Espen Eskås

2 April 2018 3	Odd	1–1	Rosenborg	Skien
20:00 CEST (UTC+2)	Rasmussen 57' (o.g.)	Summary	Helland 55'	Stadium: Skagerak Arena; Attendance: 5,497; Referee: Ola Hobber Nilsen

8 April 2018 4	Rosenborg	4–0	Molde	Trondheim
20:00 CEST (UTC+2)	Bendtner 20', 69'; Søderlund 30'; Konradsen 52'; Søderlund (yellow card) 78'	Summary	Haugen (yellow card) 38'; Gabrielsen (yellow card) 78'	Stadium: Lerkendal Stadion; Attendance: 16,154; Referee: Kai Erik Steen

16 April 2018 5	Bodø/Glimt	0–1	Rosenborg	Bodø
19:00 CEST (UTC+2)	Isidoro (yellow card) 34'; Leikvoll Moberg (yellow card) 90'	Summary	Søderlund 47'	Stadium: Aspmyra Stadion; Attendance: 4,387; Referee: Trygve Kjensli

22 April 2018 6	Rosenborg	2–0	Start	Trondheim
18:00 CEST (UTC+2)	Reginiussen 47'; Konradsen 90'	Summary	Lowe (yellow card) 40'; Twum (yellow card) 86'; Käck (yellow card) 90'	Stadium: Lerkendal Stadion; Attendance: 15,594; Referee: Trond Ivar Døvle

29 April 2018 7	Strømsgodset	0–1	Rosenborg	Drammen
20:00 CEST (UTC+2)	Pedersen (yellow card) 66'; Stengel (yellow card) 90'	Summary	Jensen 33'; Søderlund (yellow card) 55'	Stadium: Marienlyst Stadion; Attendance: 7,587; Referee: Espen Eskås

5 May 2018 8	Rosenborg	1–1	Ranheim	Trondheim
18:00 CEST (UTC+2)	de Lanlay 55'	Summary	Karlsen (yellow card) 18'; Reginiussen 78'	Stadium: Lerkendal Stadion; Attendance: 21,201; Referee: Svein Oddvar Moen

13 May 2018 9	Stabæk	0–1	Rosenborg	Bærum
20:00 CEST (UTC+2)	Moe (yellow card) 45'	Summary	Trondsen 49'	Stadium: Nadderud Stadion; Attendance: 4,561; Referee: Tom Harald Hagen

16 May 2018 10	Rosenborg	3–0	Lillestrøm	Trondheim
18:00 CEST (UTC+2)	Bendtner 13'; Helland 61'; Søderlund 75'	Summary	Kippe (yellow card) 32'	Stadium: Lerkendal Stadion; Attendance: 21,045; Referee: Ola Hobber Nilsen

21 May 2018 11	Haugesund	1–2	Rosenborg	Haugesund
18:00 CEST (UTC+2)	Gytkjær (penalty missed); Velde 88' (yellow card) 89'	Summary	Søderlund 2', 27'; Rasmussen (yellow card) 20' (yellow-red card) 54'	Stadium: Haugesund Stadion; Attendance: 6,502; Referee: Trond Ivar Døvle

27 May 2018 12	Rosenborg	1–2	Brann	Trondheim
20:00 CEST (UTC+2)	Søderlund 50'	Summary	Haugen 55'; Orry Larsen 61'; Skålevik (yellow card) 75'	Stadium: Lerkendal Stadion; Attendance: 19,806; Referee: Svein Oddvar Moen

11 June 2018 13	Tromsø	2–1	Rosenborg	Tromsø
19:00 CEST (UTC+2)	Gundersen 28'; Nilsen 58'	Summary	Reginiussen (yellow card) 60' (goal) 63'; Jensen (yellow card) 90'	Stadium: Alfheim Stadion; Attendance: 5,214; Referee: Ola Hobber Nilsen

24 June 2018 14	Rosenborg	3–0	Vålerenga	Trondheim
20:00 CEST (UTC+2)	Konradsen 13'; Helland 25'; Søderlund (yellow card) 48'; Bendtner 54' (pen.)	Summary	Ibrahim (yellow card) 24'; Fredheim Holm (yellow card) 55'; Meira (yellow card) 68'	Stadium: Lerkendal Stadion; Attendance: 16,249; Referee: Tom Harald Hagen

1 July 2018 15	Sandefjord	0–1	Rosenborg	Sandefjord
18:00 CEST (UTC+2)	Storbæk (yellow card) 22'; Kastrati (yellow card) 61'; Vallès (yellow card) 61'	Summary	Konradsen (yellow card) 60'; Levi 83'	Stadium: Komplett Arena; Attendance: 3,849; Referee: Trygve Kjensli

7 July 2018 16	Rosenborg	2–1	Tromsø	Trondheim
18:00 CEST (UTC+2)	Jensen (yellow card) 33' (goal) 34'; Botheim 48'; Dahl Reitan (yellow card) 58'	Summary	Wangberg (yellow card) 71'; Espejord 85'; Ødegaard (yellow card) 90'	Stadium: Lerkendal Stadion; Attendance: 15,384; Referee: Trond Ivar Døvle

4 August 2018 17	Ranheim	1–3	Rosenborg	Trondheim
18:00 CEST (UTC+2)	Tønne 36'	Summary	Jensen 12'; Trondsen 26'; Lundemo 77'	Stadium: EXTRA Arena; Attendance: 2,919; Referee: Tommy Skjerven

12 August 2018 18	Rosenborg	1–1	Stabæk	Trondheim
18:00 CEST (UTC+2)	Lundemo 59'	Summary	Boli 52'	Stadium: Lerkendal Stadion; Attendance: 14,046; Referee: Tore Hansen

19 August 2018 19	Kristiansund	0–2	Rosenborg	Kristiansund
18:00 CEST (UTC+2)	Kastrati (yellow card) 50'; Sørmo (yellow card) 90'	Summary	Hovland (yellow card) 47'; Konradsen 65'; Jebali 72'	Stadium: Kristiansund Stadion; Attendance: 4,277; Referee: Tom Harald Hagen

26 August 2018 20	Rosenborg	4–3	Strømsgodset	Trondheim
18:00 CEST (UTC+2)	Jebali 22'; Meling 40'; Bendtner 50'; Jensen 65'	Summary	Mos 43'; Nguen 59'; Sætra (yellow card) 77'; Hansen 84' (o.g.)	Stadium: Lerkendal Stadion; Attendance: 16,519; Referee: Ola Hobber Nilsen

2 September 2018 21	Rosenborg	1–0	Haugesund	Trondheim
18:00 CEST (UTC+2)	Denić (yellow card) 19'; Levi 23'; Jensen (yellow card) 88'	Summary	Skjerve (yellow card) 55'; Ikedi (yellow card) 74'	Stadium: Lerkendal Stadion; Attendance: 15,427; Referee: Espen Eskås

16 September 2018 22	Vålerenga	2–3	Rosenborg	Oslo
18:00 CEST (UTC+2)	Johnson 36'; Nouri 58'	Summary	Levi 45'; Jääger 50' (o.g.); Meling (yellow card) 73'; Jebali 90' (yellow card) 90'	Stadium: Intility Arena; Attendance: 14,740; Referee: Svein Oddvar Moen

23 September 2018 23	Rosenborg	3–1	Sarpsborg 08	Trondheim
18:00 CEST (UTC+2)	Denić (yellow card) 27'; Levi 66'; Søderlund 74' de Lanlay 85'	Summary	Mortensen 45'; Tamm (yellow card) 50'; Muhammed (yellow card) 73'; Horn 90' (yellow card) 90'	Stadium: Lerkendal Stadion; Attendance: 13,668; Referee: Tore Hansen

30 September 2018 24	Molde	1–0	Rosenborg	Molde
18:00 CEST (UTC+2)	Hestad (yellow card) 38'; Forren 41'	Summary	Gersbach (yellow card) 27'; Jensen (yellow card) 65'	Stadium: Aker Stadion; Attendance: 9,444; Referee: Ola Hobber Nilsen

7 October 2018 25	Rosenborg	1–1	Sandefjord	Trondheim
18:00 CEST (UTC+2)	Søderlund 69' (pen.); Šerbečić (yellow card) 72'	Summary	Kurtovic (yellow card) 19'; Vallès (yellow card) 22'; Rufo 37'	Stadium: Lerkendal Stadion; Attendance: 13,908; Referee: Trond Ivar Døvle

21 October 2018 26	Lillestrøm	0–0	Rosenborg	Lillestrøm
18:00 CEST (UTC+2)	Arnór Smárason (yellow card) 73'	Summary	Meling (yellow card) 16'; Trondsen (yellow card) 45'; Helland (yellow card) 80'	Stadium: Åråsen Stadion; Attendance: 8,256; Referee: Rohit Saggi

28 October 2018 27	Brann	1–2	Rosenborg	Bergen
20:00 CET (UTC+1)	Vega 48'	Summary	Adegbenro 14'; Jensen 16'; Hansen (yellow card) 90'	Stadium: Brann Stadion; Attendance: 12,914; Referee: Svein Oddvar Moen

4 November 2018 28	Rosenborg	3–1	Odd	Trondheim
18:00 CET (UTC+1)	Meling (yellow card) 37'; Helland 40', 61'; Jensen 56'; Denić (yellow card) 76'	Summary	Risa (yellow card) 23'; Ruud 60'	Stadium: Lerkendal Stadion; Attendance: 13,983; Referee: Tom Harald Hagen

11 November 2018 29	Start	0–1	Rosenborg	Kristiansand
18:00 CET (UTC+1)	Segberg (yellow card) 62'	Summary	Adegbenro 28'; Trondsen (yellow card) 78'	Stadium: Sør Arena; Attendance: 5,481; Referee: Trygve Kjensli

24 November 2018 30	Rosenborg	1–1	Bodø/Glimt	Trondheim
18:00 CET (UTC+1)	Trondsen (yellow card) 78' de Lanlay 73'	Summary	Saltnes 73'	Stadium: Lerkendal Stadion; Attendance: 19,086; Referee: Ola Hobber Nilsen

==== Table ====
Pos	Team	Pld	W	D	L	GF	GA	GD	Pts	Qualification or relegation
1	Rosenborg (C)	30	19	7	4	51	24	+27	64	Qualification for the Champions League first qualifying round (Note: Since the winners of the 2018 Norwegian Cup (Rosenborg) qualified for European competition based on league position, the spot awarded to the cup winners (Europa League first qualifying round) was passed to the second-placed team, while the spot awarded to the second-placed team (Europa League first qualifying round) was passed to the fourth-placed team.)
2	Molde	30	18	5	7	63	36	+27	59	Qualification for the Europa League first qualifying round
3	Brann	30	17	7	6	45	31	+14	58	Qualification for the Europa League first qualifying round
4	Haugesund	30	16	5	9	45	33	+12	53	Qualification for the Europa League first qualifying round
5	Kristiansund	30	13	7	10	46	41	+5	46	

Source: Football Association of Norway (in Norwegian), Soccerway
Rules for classification: 1) Points; 2) Goal difference; 3) Goals scored; 4) Head-to-head points; 5) Head-to-head goal difference; 6) Head-to-head away goals scored (only if between two teams); 7) Head-to-head goals scored; 8) Play-off (only used to decide champions or relegation).
(C) Champions

=== Norwegian Cup ===
19 April 2018 First Round	Trygg/Lade	2–4	Rosenborg	Trondheim
18:00 CEST (UTC+2)	Johansen Midtsand 22'; Skjeldnes Berre 45'	Summary	Šerbečić (yellow card) 20'; Zekhnini 28'; Lundemo 47'; Søderlund 52'; Haugen Bjørnstad 90' (o.g.)	Stadium: OBOS-banen; Attendance: 1,500; Referee: Thomas Solum Lystad

2 May 2018 Second Round	Steinkjer	0–5	Rosenborg	Steinkjer
18:00 CEST (UTC+2)	Sivertsen (penalty missed)	Summary	Trondsen 28'; Botheim 30', 45', 90'; Stamnestrø 85'	Stadium: Guldbergaunet Stadion; Attendance: 4,032; Referee: Robert Eggen

9 May 2018 Third Round	Brattvåg	0–1	Rosenborg	Brattvåg
18:00 CEST (UTC+2)	Grytten (yellow card) 61'; Stensøe (yellow card) 68'; Mujčić (yellow card) 88'	Summary	Søderlund 64'	Stadium: Brattvåg Stadion; Attendance: 2,087; Referee: Kristoffer Hagenes

30 May 2018 Fourth Round	Rosenborg	2–2 (a.e.t.) (7–6 p)	Odd	Trondheim
18:00 CEST (UTC+2)	Konradsen 25' (yellow card) 84'; Søderlund 81'; Meling (yellow card) 87'	Summary	Risa 3'; Lauritsen 79'	Stadium: Lerkendal Stadion; Attendance: 6,059; Referee: Kai Erik Steen
	Penalties
	Levi (penalty scored); Søderlund (penalty scored); Hedenstad (penalty scored); Hovland (penalty scored); Meling (penalty scored); Rasmussen (penalty scored); Reginiussen (penalty scored)		Lauritsen (penalty scored); Ruud (penalty scored); Nordkvelle (penalty scored); Risa (penalty scored); Bergan (penalty scored); Njie (penalty scored); Hoff (penalty missed)

26 September 2018 Quarter-finals	Rosenborg	2–0	Vålerenga	Trondheim
20:00 CEST (UTC+2)	Denić 17'; Søderlund 54'	Summary	Myhre (yellow card) 25'; Abu (yellow card) 79'; Magnus Grødem (yellow card) 89'	Stadium: Lerkendal Stadion; Attendance: 6,579; Referee: Kai Erik Steen

1 November 2018 Semi-finals	Rosenborg	2–1	Start	Trondheim
19:05 CET (UTC+1)	Bendtner 55' (yellow card) 73'; Søderlund 90'	Summary	Sandberg 33'	Stadium: Lerkendal Stadion; Attendance: 7,908; Referee: Ola Hobber Nilsen

==== Final ====
2 December 2018 Final	Rosenborg	4–1	Strømsgodset	Oslo
13:15 CET (UTC+1)	Jensen 18'; Konradsen 39'; Helland (yellow card) 43'; Bendtner 52', 90'; Hedenstad (yellow card) 62'	Summary	Mos 13'	Stadium: Ullevaal Stadion; Attendance: 22,182; Referee: Trond Ivar Døvle

=== Mesterfinalen ===
26 April 2018 Final	Lillestrøm	0–1	Rosenborg	Lillestrøm
18:30 CEST (UTC+2)		Summary	Bendtner 52'; Zekhnini (yellow card) 63'; Šerbečić (yellow card) 81'	Stadium: Åråsen Stadion; Attendance: 4,295; Referee: Tom Harald Hagen

=== Champions League ===
==== Qualifying phase ====
11 July 2018 1st qualifying round 1st leg	Valur (Iceland)	1–0	(Norway) Rosenborg	Reykjavík, Iceland
22:00 CEST (UTC+2)	Sigurbjörnsson 84'	Summary		Stadium: Hlíðarendi; Referee: Rade Obrenović, Slovenia

18 July 2018 1st qualifying round 2nd leg	Rosenborg (Norway)	3–1 (3–2 agg.)	(Iceland) Valur	Trondheim
19:45 CEST (UTC+2)	Bendtner 55' (pen.) 90' (pen.); Trondsen 84'	Summary	Sigurðsson (yellow card) 10'; Sævarsson (yellow card) 62'; Sigurðsson 85'; Pedersen (red card) 90'; Thomsen (yellow card) 90'	Stadium: Lerkendal Stadion; Attendance: 10,604; Referee: Stefan Apostolov (Bulgaria)

25 July 2018 2nd qualifying round 1st leg	Celtic (Scotland)	3–1	(Norway) Rosenborg	Glasgow, Scotland
20:45 CEST (UTC+2)	Brown (yellow card) 30'; Édouard 43', 75'; Ntcham 46' (yellow card) 65'	Summary	Meling 15' (yellow card) 83'; Reginiussen (yellow card) 55'; Søderlund (yellow card) 64'	Stadium: Celtic Park; Referee: Bart Vertenten (Belgium)

1 August 2018 2nd qualifying round 2nd leg	Rosenborg (Norway)	0–0 (1–3 agg.)	(Scotland) Celtic	Trondheim
20:45 CEST (UTC+2)	Meling (yellow card) 8'; Levi (yellow card) 74'	Summary	Ajer (yellow card) 88'	Stadium: Lerkendal Stadion; Attendance: 14,263; Referee: Sandro Schärer (Switzerland)

=== UEFA Europa League ===
==== Qualifying rounds ====
9 August 2018 3rd qualifying round 1st Leg	Cork City (Republic of Ireland)	0–2	(Norway) Rosenborg	Cork, Ireland
20:45 CEST (UTC+2)	Buckley (yellow card) 55'; McLoughlin (yellow card) 62'; Coughlan (yellow card) 83'	Summary	Levi 22', 44'; Trondsen (yellow card) 57'; Hovland (yellow card) 66'; Reginiussen (yellow card) 71'	Stadium: Turners Cross; Attendance: 5,488; Referee: Petr Ardeleanu, Czech Republic

16 August 2018 3rd qualifying round 2nd Leg	Rosenborg (Norway)	3–0 (5–0 agg.)	(Republic of Ireland) Cork City	Trondheim
20:45 CEST (UTC+2)	Šerbečić 26'; Trondsen (yellow card) 55' (goal) 58'; Søderlund 34'; Helland (yellow card) 90'	Summary		Stadium: Lerkendal Stadion; Attendance: 8,028; Referee: Mads-Kristoffer Kristoffersen, Denmark

23 August 2018 Play-off round 1st Leg	Rosenborg (Norway)	3–1	(North Macedonia) Shkëndija	Trondheim
20:45 CEST (UTC+2)	Jebali 11'; Bendtner 15'; Lundemo (yellow card) 32'; Levi 44'	Summary	Stênio Júnior 76'; Bojku (yellow card) 87'; Alimi (yellow card) 88'	Stadium: Lerkendal Stadion; Attendance: 8,767; Referee: Orel Grinfeld, Israel

30 August 2018 Play-off round 2nd Leg	Shkëndija (North Macedonia)	0–2 (1–5 agg.)	(Norway) Rosenborg	Skopje, Macedonia
20:15 CEST (UTC+2)	Ibraimi (penalty missed) 20'; Emini (penalty missed) 49'; Stênio Júnior (yellow card) 58'; Musliu (yellow card) 73'; Bejtullai (yellow card) 83'	Summary	Hovland (yellow card) 48' (goal) 67'; Reginiussen 84'	Stadium: Philip II Arena, Skopje; Referee: Aleksei Kulbakov, Belarus

==== Group stage ====
Pos	Team	Pld	W	D	L	GF	GA	GD	Pts	Qualification	SAL	CEL	RBL	ROS
1	(Austria) Red Bull Salzburg	6	6	0	0	17	6	+11	18	Advance to knockout phase	—	3–1	1–0	3–0
2	(Scotland) Celtic	6	3	0	3	6	8	−2	9	Advance to knockout phase	1–2	—	2–1	1–0
3	(Germany) RB Leipzig	6	2	1	3	9	8	+1	7		2–3	2–0	—	1–1
4	(Norway) Rosenborg	6	0	1	5	4	14	−10	1		2–5	0–1	1–3	—

Source: UEFA
Rules for classification: Group stage tiebreakers

20 September 2018 1	Celtic (Scotland)	1–0	(Norway) Rosenborg	Glasgow, Scotland
21:00 CEST (UTC+2)	Griffiths 87'	Summary	Jebali (yellow card) 15'; Søderlund (yellow card) 60'	Stadium: Celtic Park; Attendance: 47,287; Referee: Paweł Gil (Poland)

4 October 2018 2	Rosenborg (Norway)	1–3	(Germany) RB Leipzig	Trondheim
18:55 CEST (UTC+2)	Hovland (yellow card) 58'; Jebali 79'	Summary	Augustin 12'; Konaté 54'; Cunha 61'	Stadium: Lerkendal Stadion; Attendance: 11,484; Referee: Marco Guida (Italy)

25 October 2018 3	Red Bull Salzburg (Austria)	3–0	(Norway) Rosenborg	Salzburg, Austria
18:55 CEST (UTC+2)	Dabour 34', 59' (pen.); Wolf 53'; André (yellow card) 84'	Summary	Šerbečić (yellow card) 15'; Jensen (yellow card) 67'	Stadium: Red Bull Arena; Attendance: 20,639; Referee: Irfan Peljto (Bosnia and Herzegovina)

8 November 2018 4	Rosenborg (Norway)	2–5	(Austria) Red Bull Salzburg	Trondheim
21:00 CET (UTC+1)	Adegbenro 52'; Jensen 62'	Summary	Minamino 6', 19', 45'; Gulbrandsen 37'; Hovland 57' (o.g.); Samassékou (yellow card) 61'; Dabour (yellow card) 83'; Schlager (yellow card) 86'	Stadium: Lerkendal Stadion; Attendance: 12,836; Referee: Aleksei Eskov (Russia)

29 November 2018 5	Rosenborg (Norway)	0–1	(Scotland) Celtic	Trondheim
18:55 CET (UTC+1)	Konradsen (yellow card) 37'; Denić (yellow card) 49'	Summary	Sinclair 42'	Stadium: Lerkendal Stadion; Attendance: 14,061; Referee: Halis Özkahya (Turkey)

13 December 2018 6	RB Leipzig (Germany)	1–1	(Norway) Rosenborg	Leipzig, Germany
21:00 CET (UTC+1)	Cunha 47'; Bruma (yellow card) 89'	Summary	Trondsen (yellow card) 34'; Jebali (yellow card) 55'; Konradsen (yellow card) 79'; Reginiussen 86'	Stadium: Red Bull Arena; Attendance: 16,957; Referee: Serhiy Boyko (Ukraine)

=== Club Friendlies ===
17 January 2018	Rosenborg	4–1	Kolstad	Malvik
18:00 UTC (UTC+1)	Botheim 15'; Helmersen 46', 49', 86'	Summary	Sørhøy 40'	Stadium: Abrahallen

7 February 2018	Rosenborg	2–3	Byåsen	Malvik
18:00 UTC (UTC+1)	Jensen 14'; Levi 84'	Summary	Obiech 29'; Bjørnholm 36', 50'	Stadium: Abrahallen; Attendance: 250; Referee: Thomas Solum Lystad

12 February 2018	Rosenborg	3–1	Stjørdals-Blink	Malvik
18:00 UTC (UTC+1)	Søderlund 41'; Jensen 73'; Helland 83'	Summary	Rødahl 4'	Stadium: Abrahallen

14 February 2018	Rosenborg	4–0	Melhus	Malvik
17:30 UTC (UTC+1)	Botheim 36'; Søderlund 74', 88'; Helland 90'	Summary		Stadium: Abrahallen

17 February 2018	Rosenborg	5–0	Nardo	Malvik
11:30 UTC (UTC+1)	Konradsen 14'; Adegbenro 23'; Helland 26'; Levi 73'; Botheim 79' (pen.)	Summary		Stadium: Abrahallen; Referee: Thomas Solum Lystad

22 February 2018	Rosenborg (Norway)	3–2	(Russia) Krasnodar	Marbella, Spain
16:00 UTC (UTC+1)	Helland 56'; Meling 58'; Søderlund 78'	Summary	Shatov 4'; Mamaev 90'

25 February 2018	Rosenborg (Norway)	1–4	(Russia) Rubin Kazan	Marbella, Spain
15:00 UTC (UTC+1)	Rasmussen 31'	Summary	Popov 29'; Azmoun 36'; Ustinov 58'; Akhmetov 88'

28 February 2018	Rosenborg (Norway)	3–1	(Belarus) Dinamo Brest	Marbella, Spain
16:00 UTC (UTC+1)	Bendtner 38', 84'; Lundemo 79'	Summary	Fameyeh 6'

5 March 2018	Lillestrøm	0–0	Rosenborg	Lillestrøm
18:30 CEST (UTC+2)		Summary		Stadium: LSK-Hallen; Referee: Tom Harald Hagen

28 March 2018	Rosenborg	2–1	Ranheim	Trondheim
14:00 UTC (UTC+1)	Helland 49' (pen.); Reitan 55'	Summary	Solbakken 90'

== Squad statistics ==
=== Appearances and goals ===
As of match played 13 December 2018

No.	Pos	Nat	Player	Total		Eliteserien		Norwegian Cup		Mesterfinalen		Champions League		Europa League	
No.	Pos	Nat	Player	Apps	Goals	Apps	Goals	Apps	Goals	Apps	Goals	Apps	Goals	Apps	Goals
1	GK	(Norway) NOR	André Hansen	46	0	29+0	0	3+0	0	0+0	0	4+0	0	10+0	0
2	DF	(Norway) NOR	Vegar Eggen Hedenstad	43	0	27+0	0	4+0	0	0+0	0	4+0	0	8+0	0
3	DF	(Norway) NOR	Birger Meling	46	1	28+0	0	5+1	0	0+0	0	4+0	1	8+0	0
4	DF	(Norway) NOR	Tore Reginiussen	47	4	29+0	2	5+0	0	0+1	0	4+0	0	8+0	2
5	MF	(Serbia) SRB	Đorđe Denić	17	1	5+3	0	1+0	1	0+0	0	0+0	0	3+5	0
7	MF	(Denmark) DEN	Mike Jensen	46	8	28+0	6	4+0	1	0+0	0	4+0	0	10+0	1
8	MF	(Norway) NOR	Anders Konradsen	30	6	17+1	5	3+0	1	0+0	0	0+0	0	8+1	0
9	FW	(Denmark) DEN	Nicklas Bendtner	37	12	22+1	5	2+0	3	1+0	1	4+0	2	7+0	1
10	FW	(Iceland) ISL	Matthías Vilhjálmsson	14	0	2+5	0	0+1	0	0+0	0	0+2	0	0+4	0
11	FW	(Norway) NOR	Yann-Erik de Lanlay	25	3	9+8	3	3+1	0	0+0	0	0+0	0	4+0	0
14	FW	(Norway) NOR	Alexander Søderlund	44	14	17+10	8	3+3	5	0+1	0	1+3	0	5+1	1
15	MF	(Norway) NOR	Anders Trondsen	38	5	24+0	2	4+1	1	0+0	0	4+0	1	4+1	1
16	DF	(Norway) NOR	Even Hovland	45	1	27+0	0	4+0	0	1+0	0	4+0	0	9+0	1
17	FW	(Sweden) SWE	Jonathan Levi	40	7	10+9	4	5+2	0	1+0	0	3+1	0	6+3	3
20	DF	(Australia) AUS	Alex Gersbach	7	0	3+0	0	0+1	0	0+0	0	0+1	0	2+0	0
23	FW	(Norway) NOR	Pål André Helland	30	4	19+1	4	2+2	0	0+0	0	3+0	0	0+3	0
24	GK	(Norway) NOR	Arild Østbø	8	0	1+2	0	4+0	0	1+0	0	0+0	0	0+0	0
25	MF	(Norway) NOR	Marius Lundemo	29	3	7+9	2	2+0	1	0+0	0	3+1	0	5+2	0
26	DF	(Bosnia and Herzegovina) BIH	Besim Šerbečić	13	0	1+3	0	4+0	0	1+0	0	0+0	0	3+1	0
27	FW	(Tunisia) TUN	Issam Jebali	13	5	7+0	3	1+0	0	0+0	0	0+0	0	4+1	2
28	FW	(Nigeria) NGA	Samuel Adegbenro	13	4	5+2	3	2+0	0	0+0	0	0+0	0	3+1	1
30	DF	(Nigeria) NGA	Igoh Ogbu	0	0	0+0	0	0+0	0	0+0	0	0+0	0	0+0	0
32	DF	(Norway) NOR	Erlend Dahl Reitan	19	0	4+4	0	3+1	0	1+0	0	1+0	0	2+3	0
34	FW	(Norway) NOR	Erik Botheim	12	4	1+4	1	2+0	3	1+0	0	1+1	0	0+2	0
35	FW	(Norway) NOR	Emil Konradsen Ceide	4	0	0+2	0	0+1	0	0+1	0	0+0	0	0+0	0
36	MF	(Norway) NOR	Olaus Skarsem	3	0	0+0	0	0+1	0	0+1	0	0+0	0	0+1	0
38	MF	(Norway) NOR	Mikael Tørset Johnsen	2	0	0+0	0	0+1	0	0+1	0	0+0	0	0+0	0
	DF	(Norway) NOR	Torbjørn Lysaker Heggem	1	0	0+0	0	0+0	0	0+1	0	0+0	0	0+0	0
	DF	(Norway) NOR	Robert Williams	1	0	0+0	0	0+1	0	0+0	0	0+0	0	0+0	0
Players away from Rosenborg on loan:
19	FW	(Norway) NOR	Andreas Helmersen	0	0	0+0	0	0+0	0	0+0	0	0+0	0	0+0	0
20	DF	(Denmark) DEN	Malte Amundsen	3	0	0+0	0	2+0	0	1+0	0	0+0	0	0+0	0
33	GK	(Norway) NOR	Julian Faye Lund	0	0	0+0	0	0+0	0	0+0	0	0+0	0	0+0	0
Players who appeared for Rosenborg no longer at the club:
5	DF	(Denmark) DEN	Jacob Rasmussen	15	0	7+3	0	4+0	0	1+0	0	0+0	0	0+0	0
18	MF	(Norway) NOR	Magnus Stamnestrø	2	1	0+0	0	0+2	1	0+0	0	0+0	0	0+0	0
22	MF	(Norway) NOR	Morten Konradsen	5	0	0+1	0	2+1	0	1+0	0	0+0	0	0+0	0
27	FW	(Norway) NOR	Rafik Zekhnini	10	1	0+6	0	3+0	1	1+0	0	0+0	0	0+0	0

=== Disciplinary record ===
As of match played 13 December 2018

Number	Nation	Position	Name	Eliteserien		Norwegian Cup		Mesterfinalen		Champions League		Europa League		Total	
Number	Nation	Position	Name	Booked	Sent off (straight red)	Booked	Sent off (straight red)	Booked	Sent off (straight red)	Booked	Sent off (straight red)	Booked	Sent off (straight red)	Booked	Sent off (straight red)
1	(Norway)	GK	André Hansen	1	0	0	0	0	0	0	0	0	0	1	0
2	(Norway)	DF	Vegar Eggen Hedenstad	1	0	1	0	0	0	0	0	0	0	2	0
3	(Norway)	DF	Birger Meling	3	0	1	0	0	0	2	0	0	0	6	0
4	(Norway)	DF	Tore Reginiussen	1	0	0	0	0	0	1	0	1	0	3	0
5	(Serbia)	MF	Đorđe Denić	3	0	0	0	0	0	0	0	1	0	4	0
7	(Denmark)	MF	Mike Jensen	4	0	0	0	0	0	0	0	1	0	5	0
8	(Norway)	MF	Anders Konradsen	1	0	1	0	0	0	0	0	1	0	3	0
9	(Denmark)	FW	Nicklas Bendtner	1	0	1	0	0	0	0	0	0	0	2	0
10	(Iceland)	FW	Matthías Vilhjálmsson	0	0	0	0	0	0	0	0	0	0	0	0
11	(Norway)	FW	Yann-Erik de Lanlay	0	0	0	0	0	0	0	0	0	0	0	0
14	(Norway)	FW	Alexander Søderlund	3	0	0	0	0	0	1	0	1	0	5	0
15	(Norway)	MF	Anders Trondsen	3	0	0	0	0	0	0	0	3	0	6	0
16	(Norway)	DF	Even Hovland	1	0	0	0	0	0	0	0	3	0	4	0
17	(Sweden)	FW	Jonathan Levi	0	0	0	0	0	0	1	0	0	0	1	0
20	(Australia)	DF	Alex Gersbach	1	0	0	0	0	0	0	0	0	0	1	0
23	(Norway)	FW	Pål André Helland	1	0	1	0	0	0	0	0	1	0	3	0
24	(Norway)	GK	Arild Østbø	0	0	0	0	0	0	0	0	0	0	0	0
25	(Norway)	MF	Marius Lundemo	0	0	0	0	0	0	0	0	1	0	1	0
26	(Bosnia and Herzegovina)	DF	Besim Šerbečić	1	0	1	0	1	0	0	0	1	0	4	0
27	(Tunisia)	FW	Issam Jebali	1	0	0	0	0	0	0	0	2	0	3	0
28	(Nigeria)	FW	Samuel Adegbenro	0	0	0	0	0	0	0	0	0	0	0	0
30	(Nigeria)	DF	Igoh Ogbu	0	0	0	0	0	0	0	0	0	0	0	0
32	(Norway)	DF	Erlend Dahl Reitan	1	0	0	0	0	0	0	0	0	0	1	0
34	(Norway)	FW	Erik Botheim	0	0	0	0	0	0	0	0	0	0	0	0
35	(Norway)	FW	Emil Konradsen Ceide	0	0	0	0	0	0	0	0	0	0	0	0
36	(Norway)	MF	Olaus Skarsem	0	0	0	0	0	0	0	0	0	0	0	0
38	(Norway)	MF	Mikael Tørset Johnsen	0	0	0	0	0	0	0	0	0	0	0	0
	(Norway)	DF	Torbjørn Lysaker Heggem	0	0	0	0	0	0	0	0	0	0	0	0
	(Norway)	DF	Robert Williams	0	0	0	0	0	0	0	0	0	0	0	0
Players away from Rosenborg on loan:
19	(Norway)	FW	Andreas Helmersen	0	0	0	0	0	0	0	0	0	0	0	0
20	(Denmark)	DF	Malte Amundsen	0	0	0	0	0	0	0	0	0	0	0	0
33	(Norway)	GK	Julian Faye Lund	0	0	0	0	0	0	0	0	0	0	0	0
Players who appeared for Rosenborg no longer at the club:
5	(Denmark)	DF	Jacob Rasmussen	0	1	0	0	0	0	0	0	0	0	0	1
18	(Norway)	DF	Magnus Stamnestrø	0	0	0	0	0	0	0	0	0	0	0	0
22	(Norway)	MF	Morten Konradsen	0	0	0	0	0	0	0	0	0	0	0	0
27	(Norway)	FW	Rafik Zekhnini	0	0	0	0	1	0	0	0	0	0	1	0
			TOTALS	27	1	6	0	2	0	5	0	16	0	56	1

== See also ==
- Rosenborg BK seasons
