= Nicklas Bendtner =

Danish footballer (born 1988)

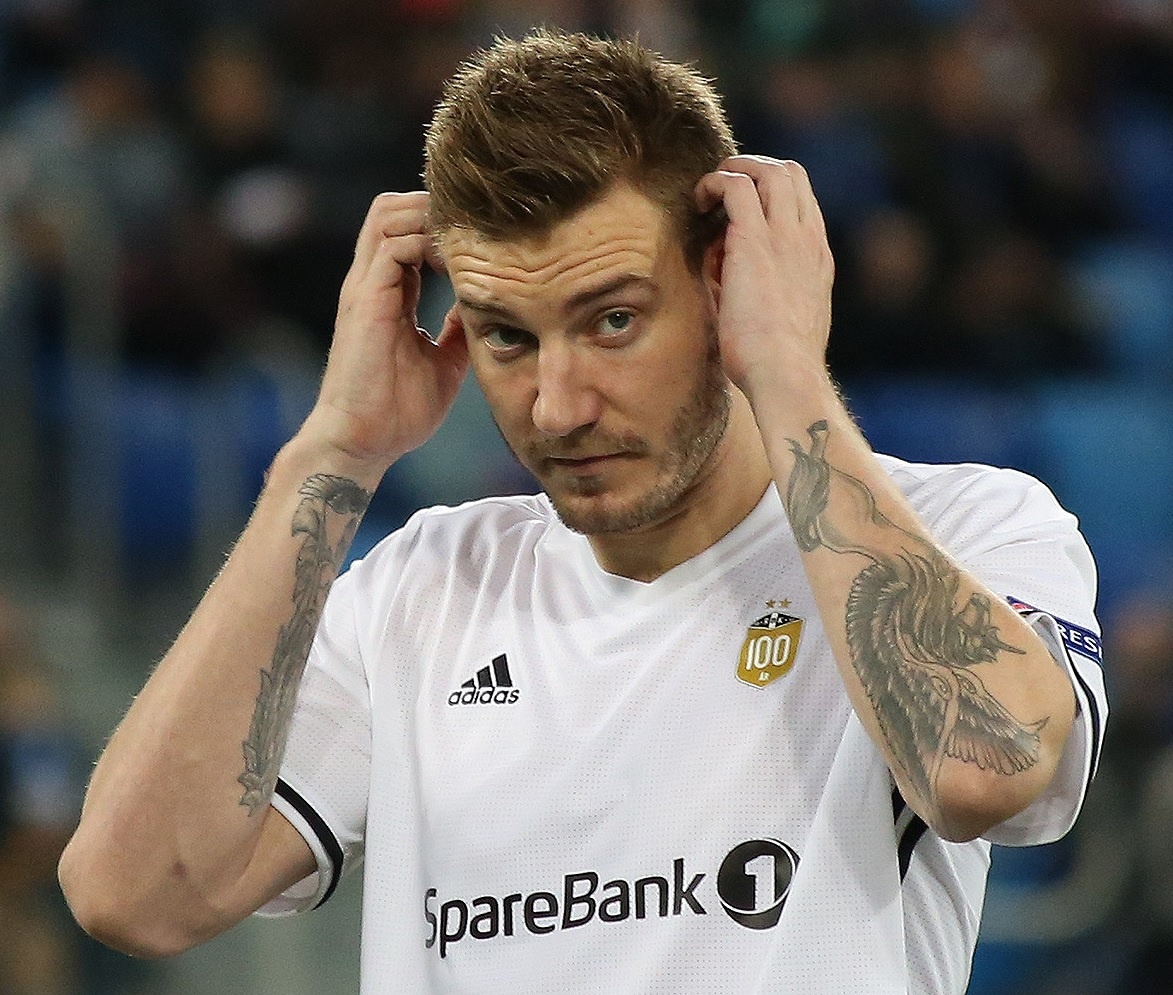
- Bendtner with Rosenborg in 2017

Personal information
- Full name: Nicklas Bendtner
- Date of birth: 16 January 1988 (age 38)
- Place of birth: Copenhagen, Denmark
- Height: 1.94 m (6 ft 4 in)
- Position: Striker

Youth career
- 1992–1998: Tårnby Boldklub
- 1998–2004: Kjøbenhavns Boldklub
- 2004–2005: Arsenal

Senior career*
Years	Team	Apps	(Gls)
2005–2014	Arsenal	108	(24)
2006–2007	→ Birmingham City (loan)	42	(11)
2011–2012	→ Sunderland (loan)	28	(8)
2012–2013	→ Juventus (loan)	9	(0)
2014–2016	VfL Wolfsburg	31	(3)
2016–2017	Nottingham Forest	15	(2)
2017–2019	Rosenborg	57	(24)
2019	Copenhagen	6	(0)
Total		296	(72)

International career
2004	Denmark U16	3	(3)
2004–2005	Denmark U17	15	(6)
2006	Denmark U19	2	(1)
2006	Denmark U21	4	(2)
2006–2018	Denmark	81	(30)
- * Club domestic league appearances and goals

Nicklas Bendtner (Danish pronunciation: [ˈne̝klæs ˈpenˀtnɐ]; born 16 January 1988) is a Danish former professional footballer who played as a striker. A large, tall, and physically strong player, he was known for his ability in the air and possessed a powerful header.

Having progressed through the youth ranks at Tårnby Boldklub, Kjøbenhavns Boldklub and Arsenal, Bendtner signed his first professional contract with Arsenal in 2005. He made his debut in October 2005 in the League Cup against Sunderland. For the 2006–07 season, Bendtner was loaned out to Championship club Birmingham City, where he made 48 appearances. Following his return to Arsenal, he became a regular first team player, but began to slip out of favour during the 2010–11 season. As a result, he moved on loan to Premier League club Sunderland for the majority of the 2011–12 season, where he made 30 appearances. He then spent the entire 2012–13 season on loan to Serie A club Juventus, where he made 10 appearances but failed to score. Bendtner was released by Arsenal in 2014. He subsequently joined VfL Wolfsburg on a free transfer, for whom he scored the winning goal in the 2015 DFL-Supercup. Released in 2016, he returned to England, where he spent the first half of the 2016–17 season with Nottingham Forest of the Championship, and in March 2017 he signed for Rosenborg.

Bendtner has played internationally for Denmark at under-16, under-17, under-19, under-21 and senior levels. He made his senior international debut as an 18-year-old, on 16 August 2006 in a friendly match against Poland, and scored his first international goal in that match. Bendtner was a member of Denmark's 2010 FIFA World Cup and UEFA Euro 2012 squads, and helped them qualify for the 2018 World Cup.

== Club career ==
=== Youth career ===
Bendtner was born in Copenhagen. As a child, he played football for Tårnby Boldklub before joining F.C. Copenhagen's feeder club Kjøbenhavns Boldklub (KB) in 1998. He scored four goals in six Danish national youth team matches, before joining English club Arsenal in August 2004.

=== Arsenal ===
Bendtner formed a prolific strike partnership in the Arsenal reserves with Arturo Lupoli. His first-team debut for Arsenal came on 25 October 2005 in a League Cup match against Sunderland at the Stadium of Light, as a late substitute for Quincy Owusu-Abeyie.

==== Loan to Birmingham City ====
Bendtner was loaned to Championship team Birmingham City in August 2006 to gain first team experience; the loan initially ran until January 2007. He made his debut for Birmingham as a substitute for Stephen Clemence against Colchester United on 5 August. He played the final half-hour and scored the winning goal. The loan at Birmingham was extended until the end of the 2006–07 season. He finished with eleven league goals as Birmingham were promoted to the Premier League as Championship runners-up.

==== 2007–08 season ====
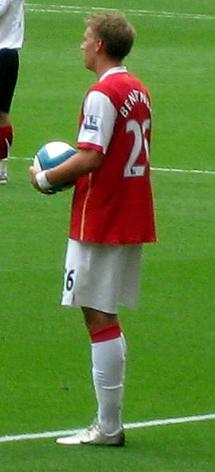
Bendtner playing for Arsenal in 2007

Bendtner signed a new five-year contract with Arsenal in May 2007, and returned to the club for the 2007–08 Premier League season. After impressing at Birmingham, the teenage striker was presented with opportunities to seek first-team football elsewhere, with reports that Olympique Lyonnais and Milan wanted the promising teenager, but he stayed on in order to earn his place in the starting eleven.

Bendtner scored his first goal at the Emirates Stadium against Paris Saint-Germain in the inaugural Emirates Cup pre-season tournament; he assisted another for Mathieu Flamini and missed a late penalty. He made his Premier League debut as a substitute against Fulham on 12 August 2007. His first competitive strike for the Gunners was the match-winning goal in a 2–0 League Cup match against Newcastle United on 25 September 2007. On 23 October, he scored his debut UEFA Champions League goal in the 89th minute against Slavia Prague, finishing off a back-heeled pass from Emmanuel Eboué to complete a 7–0 win and equal the record Champions League victory.

Bendtner's first Premier League goal came on 22 December 2007 in a 2–1 Arsenal victory in the North London derby against Tottenham Hotspur at the Emirates Stadium. He headed the winning goal from a Cesc Fàbregas corner just 1.8 seconds (official time) after coming on as a substitute for Eboué, breaking the previous record. His first Premier League start came a week later at Everton; he was sent off for two bookable offences. After serving his suspension, he scored his first FA Cup goal against Burnley on 6 January 2008 as Arsenal won 2–0.

During the season, manager Arsène Wenger tried to partner Bendtner with Emmanuel Adebayor whenever Robin van Persie was rested. Bendtner and Adebayor, however, did not get along well. It became apparent during the 2008 League Cup semi-final second leg away at Tottenham when the pair had a heated on-pitch altercation with the scoreline at 4–1 to Tottenham and referee Howard Webb, captain William Gallas, and other teammates had to intervene and separate the two. Adebayor later apologized on Arsenal's website and the Football Association declined to take any formal action against either.

Bendtner also scored a last minute equaliser against Aston Villa to keep Arsenal top of the table.

==== 2008–09 season ====
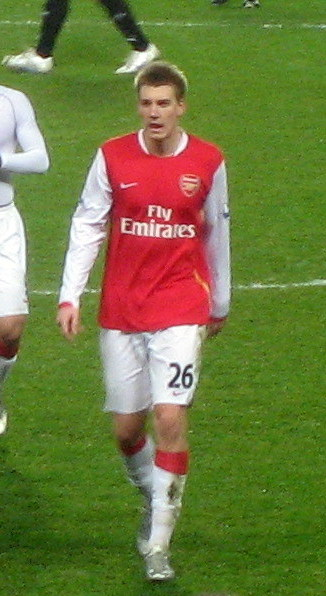
Bendtner with Arsenal in 2008

The highlight of Bendtner's 2008–09 pre-season was scoring four goals in the first half of Arsenal's 10–2 victory against Burgenland XI on 29 July 2008. He scored his first Premier League goal of the season against Bolton Wanderers and within 90 seconds provided an assist for Eboué to score.

Bendtner had a hard time in October and November, but on 25 November, he scored a controversial 87th-minute winner against Dynamo Kyiv in the Champions League to ensure Arsenal progressed to the knockout stages. After treatment to an injured player, with Dynamo apparently expecting the ball to be returned to them, Fàbregas hit the ball forward and Bendtner scored with a left-footed shot. He was booked for removing his shirt in celebration. In January, he scored two more goals as a substitute, late winners at home to Bolton and Hull City, both from Van Persie crosses.

On 24 February, Bendtner was goaded after missing a number of chances in the 1–0 win over Roma in the Champions League knockout stages. The following week, he scored two goals at West Bromwich Albion as Arsenal won 3–1. The fans were much more supportive towards him when he missed a string of chances against Blackburn Rovers. Arsenal still won 4–0, thanks to Andrey Arshavin's stunner, and a brace from Eboué. Bendtner got a goal in a 3–1 win at Newcastle United, a header from a long free-kick.

On 5 May 2009, the 21-year-old Bendtner was seen leaving a nightclub hours after Arsenal's 3–1 home defeat by rival side Manchester United in the Champions League semi-final, pictured with his belt undone and jeans pulled down. He later said: "I may be young, but my actions were a poor error of judgment and something I deeply regret." Bendtner was a second-half substitute for Arsenal, who lost 4–1 on aggregate to defending champions United. Bendtner made amends with a goal, albeit a consolation, in a 4–1 defeat to London rival club Chelsea.

==== 2009–10 season ====
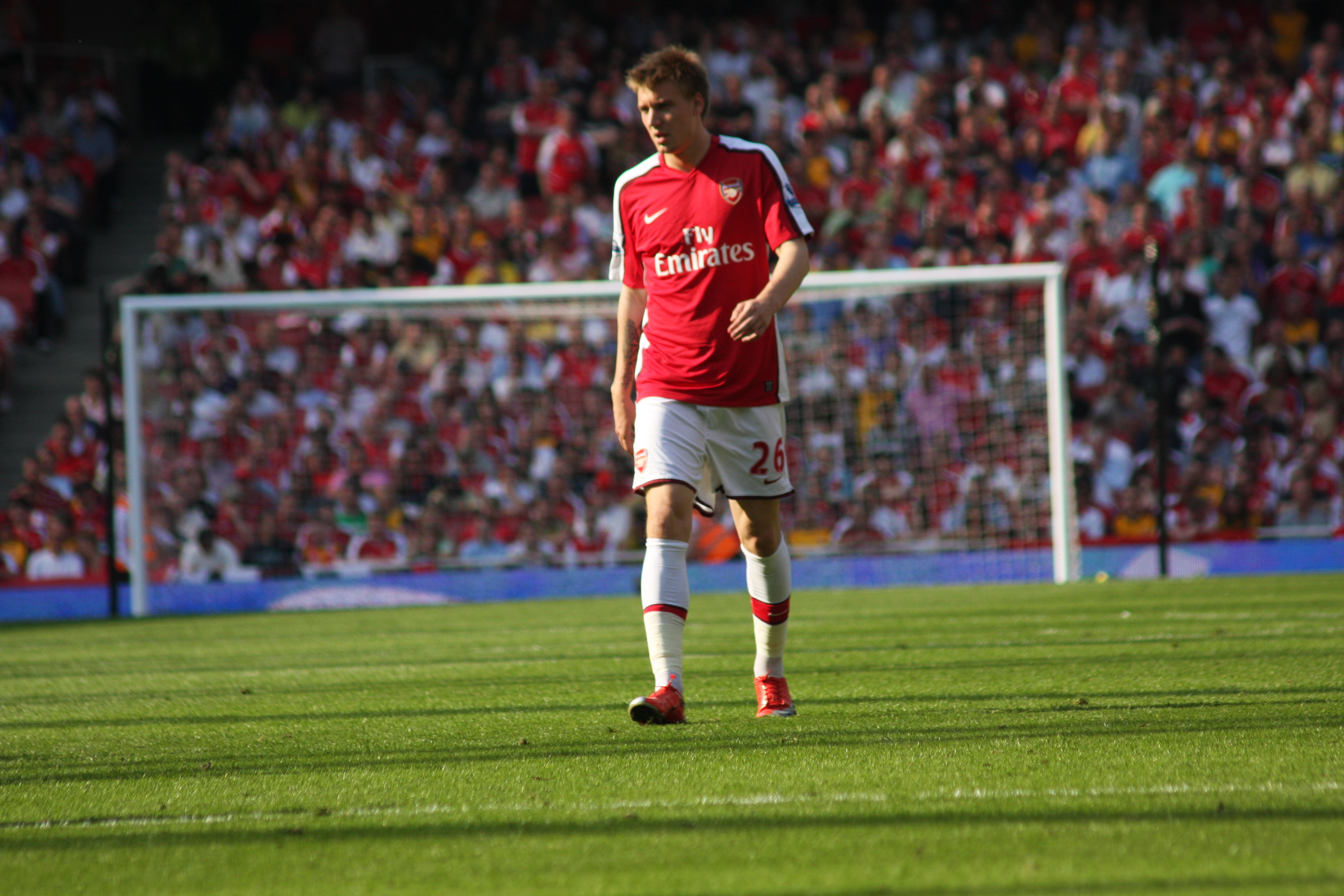
Bendtner playing for Arsenal against Stoke City in 2009

Bendtner started the 2009–10 season by announcing a change in his Arsenal squad number from 26, which he had been allocated initially, to 52, which he claimed was "a special number to [him] personally". He agreed to refund any supporters who had already bought a shirt printed with his original number. He scored his first goal of the season in the Champions League group stage in a 3–2 away win against Standard Liège. On the morning of 27 September, he was involved in a car accident while driving along the A1. He suffered cuts to his knees and shoulder pain, and wrote off his Aston Martin. He returned to action on 4 October and scored his first league goal of the season in Arsenal's 6–2 win over Blackburn Rovers. On 28 October, he scored the winning goal in the League Cup in a 2–1 win against Liverpool.

On 10 November, Bendtner underwent surgery in Germany after aggravating a groin injury in the 3–0 win on 31 October playing against Tottenham Hotspur. He was expected to be out for up to four weeks, but did not return until 27 January in a 0–0 draw at Villa Park. He started his first match after recovering from his injury and played 82 minutes in Arsenal's victory over Liverpool on 10 February to complete his return to full fitness. Ten days later, he scored his first league goal since October with the opener in a 2–0 home defeat of Sunderland. He followed this up with the equalising goal in a 3–1 win against Stoke City at the Britannia Stadium on 27 February.

On 9 March, Bendtner scored the first hat-trick of his professional career in a 5–0 victory over Porto in the second leg of the Champions League first knockout round to overturn their 2–1 loss in the first leg. Four days later, he scored a stoppage-time winning goal against Hull City to put the Gunners level on points with Chelsea at the top of the Premier League. Another stoppage-time winner followed in the 1–0 victory over Wolverhampton Wanderers on 3 April.

Bendtner won the Arsenal Player of the Month award for his performances in March, taking over 33% of the votes. He scored the only goal for Arsenal in a 4–1 defeat to Barcelona at the Camp Nou as they were knocked out of the Champions League in the quarter-final on 6 April.

==== 2010–11 season ====
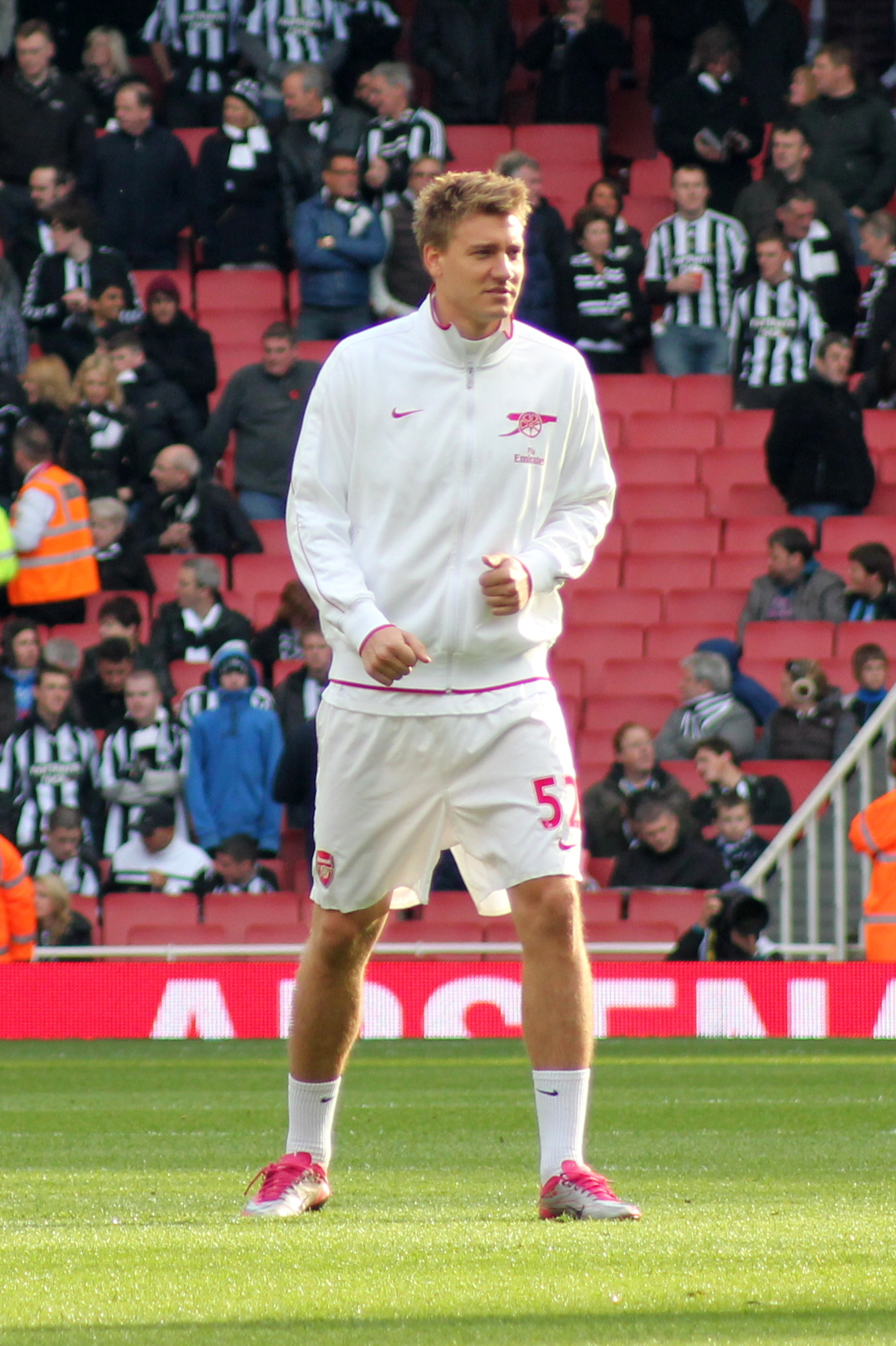
Bendtner warming up for Arsenal in 2010

After worsening his groin problem during the 2010 World Cup, and spending almost four months out of action, Bendtner's first appearance of the season came as a substitute against Birmingham City on 16 October. On 24 October, he scored his first goal of the season in a 3–0 away win against Manchester City. Three days later, he scored again in a match against Newcastle United in the League Cup at St James' Park, as Arsenal won 4–0. Bendtner scored his first goal of 2011 on 25 January against Ipswich Town in the League Cup, to level the aggregate score at 1–1. Arsenal won the match 3–0, and 3–1 on aggregate. The goal earned him the Arsenal Goal of the Month award for January. On 2 March, Bendtner scored a hat-trick in the FA Cup fifth round replay against League One team Leyton Orient. it was his first hat-trick for nearly a year, and the first by an Arsenal player in an FA Cup tie since Ian Wright's against Yeovil Town in 1993.

Bendtner was left out of Arsenal's 2011 summer tour of Asia while talks took place over a transfer. Amid rumours of interest from Stoke City and Borussia Dortmund, as well as confirmed interest from Hamburg sporting director Frank Arnesen, Bendtner made public his desire to leave Arsenal in August, citing the need for first-team football as motivation.

==== Loan to Sunderland ====
On the last day of the August 2011 transfer window, Premier League club Sunderland completed a one-year loan deal for Bendtner; the striker linked up again with manager Steve Bruce. A couple of days later, Bendtner was reported as saying that he would never play for Arsenal again because he was not given the opportunity to establish himself in the first team after his car accident. On his debut, he made an assist against Chelsea. His first goal came on 1 October to begin Sunderland's comeback from 2–0 down to draw with West Bromwich Albion, and he made the cross from which Ahmed Elmohamady equalised. Bendtner had to wait three weeks for the Dubious Goals Committee to credit him with the goal, which had gone into the net off Gareth McAuley.

Bendtner's second goal for Sunderland came in injury time against Bolton Wanderers; the match ended 2–0 and was Sunderland's first away win of the season. He scored his third in a 3–2 win at Queens Park Rangers. On 21 January 2012, Bendtner fractured his eye-socket in a collision during Sunderland's match against Swansea City on 21 January 2012; when he returned to action, he wore a protective facemask. He converted a penalty in the Tyne-Wear derby on 4 March to put Sunderland 1–0 up, and scored again the following week to give his team a 1–0 victory against Liverpool. In Sunderland's 3–1 victory at home to Queens Park Rangers, he scored the opening goal with an "unstoppable" header, and took his total for March to four from five matches with Sunderland's second goal in a 3–3 draw away to Manchester City. He finished the season as Sunderland's top scorer in Premier League matches with eight goals.

==== Loan to Juventus ====
On the last day of the August 2012 transfer window, Bendtner joined Italian Serie A club Juventus on loan for the season, with an option to make the move permanent. He made his debut as a substitute for Fabio Quagliarella in a 2–0 win against Chievo at the Juventus Stadium on 22 September 2012, and his first start came five weeks later in a 1–0 win against Catania. He again started in the Coppa Italia match against Cagliari in December, but suffered a thigh injury that required surgery and was expected to be out for at least two months. While he was ruled out through injury, he was at the centre of controversy when he was arrested for drink driving on 4 March 2013. Bendtner did not return to action until Juventus's last league match of the season with the title already secured. Coming on as a 74th-minute substitute in the 3–2 defeat away to Sampdoria on 18 May 2013, he fractured his wrist late in the game. He finished his season with only two league starts and without a goal in eleven appearances in all competitions. Juventus chose not to make the loan move permanent, and Bendtner returned to Arsenal. Juventus stated they had not sold any shirts with Bendtner's name on it until talkSPORT presenter, Darren Gough, became the first person to buy one despite the shop staff attempting to dissuade him.

==== 2013–14 season ====
On 22 September 2013, Bendtner was an unused substitute against Stoke City. Three days later, he made his first Arsenal appearance for two years in a League Cup match against West Bromwich Albion. He made the assist for Thomas Eisfeld's goal as the match finished 1–1 after extra time. Bendtner played the whole 120 minutes and scored Arsenal's first penalty as they won the shoot-out 4–3. He scored his first Arsenal goal since March 2011 with a second-minute header in a 2–0 win against Hull Cuty on 4 December. On 1 January 2014, Bendtner scored his last goal for Arsenal against Cardiff City in the 88th minute, injuring his ankle in the process before Theo Walcott sealed a 2–0 win. Although he had hoped to prove himself to Arsenal, this did not happen, and he was released at the end of the season when his contract expired.

=== VfL Wolfsburg ===
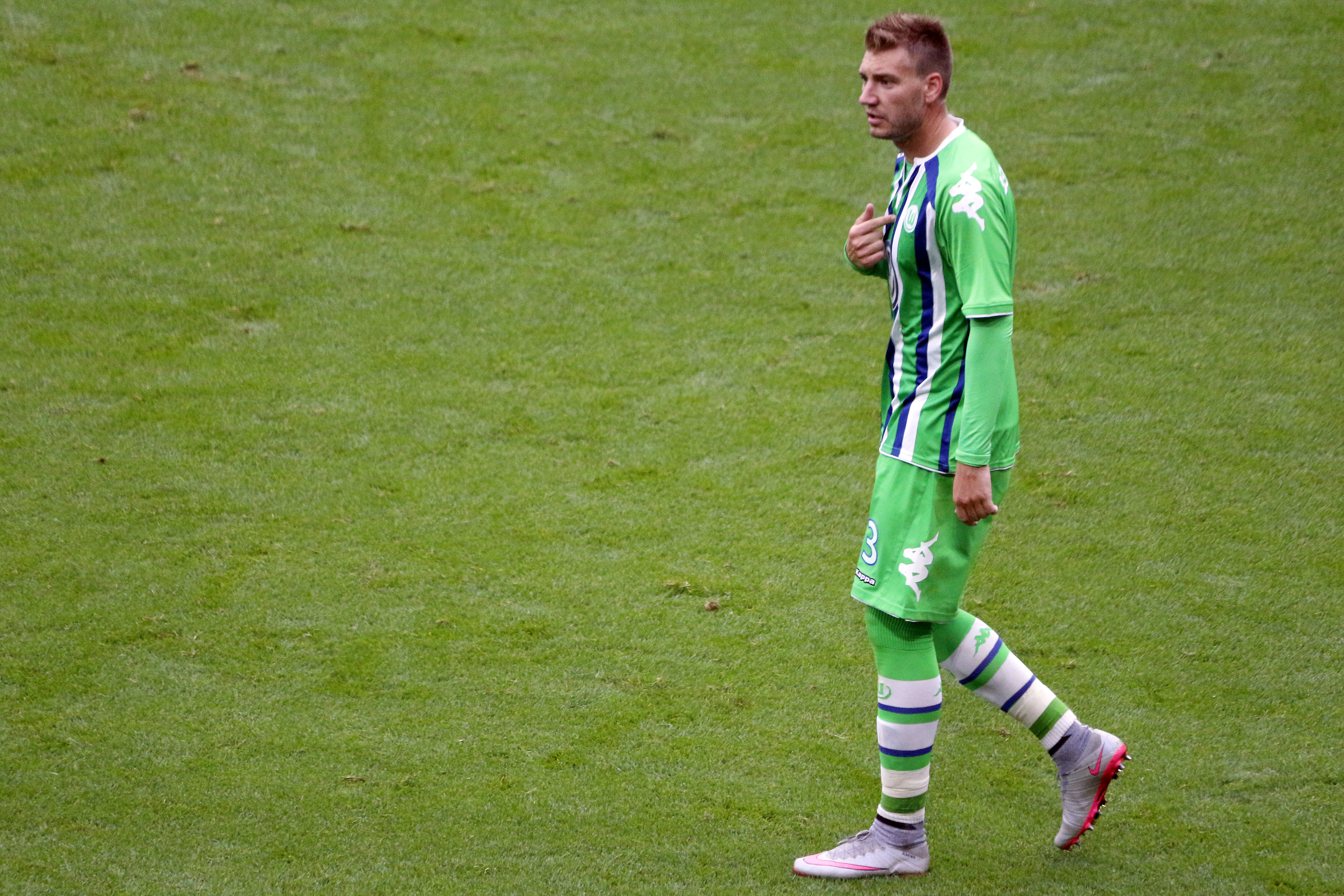
Bendtner playing for VfL Wolfsburg in 2015

On 15 August 2014, Bendtner signed a three-year deal with VfL Wolfsburg of the Bundesliga. Managing director Klaus Allofs described him as "a striker at the best age, who already was able to gather a lot of international experience in his career, which did not always run in a straight line". Bendtner made his Wolfsburg debut on 30 August, as a second-half substitute against Eintracht Frankfurt in a match that finished 2–2. On 6 November, he scored his first two goals for Wolfsburg, one from the penalty-spot and one from open play, in a 5–1 win against Krasnodar in the Europa League. Sixteen days later, he scored his first Bundesliga goal, against Schalke 04 in a 3–2 away defeat. On 19 March 2015, he scored an 89th-minute winner against Inter Milan at the San Siro to secure a 5–2 aggregate victory that took Wolfsburg to the quarter-final of the Europa League. Bendtner was an unused substitute as Wolfsburg beat Borussia Dortmund 3–1 in the 2015 DFB-Pokal Final.

Bendtner began his second season at Wolfsburg with the 2015 DFL-Supercup against Bayern Munich: he produced a "poacher's finish" in the 89th minute from Kevin De Bruyne's cross to draw the game level at 1–1 and then scored the winner in the penalty shootout to clinch the trophy. On 8 August 2015, he continued his good form by scoring in a 4–1 win at Stuttgarter Kickers in the first round of the 2015–16 DFB-Pokal, and opened his Bundesliga account for the season two weeks later with a goal in a 1–1 draw with 1. FC Köln.

On 25 April 2016, Wolfsburg announced that Bendtner's contract, which was due to run until June 2017, had been terminated with immediate effect. While a free agent, Bendtner trained with his hometown club F.C. Copenhagen.

=== Nottingham Forest ===
On 7 September 2016, Bendtner signed a two-year deal with English Championship club Nottingham Forest. Bendtner said that he moved to Forest because both parties were desperate- Forest offered Bendtner a large salary as they were desperate for a striker, and Bendtner wanted to move closer to his son in London and to get his footballing career back on track. He made his debut for the club on 20 September in the 2016–17 EFL Cup against former club Arsenal, after which Arsène Wenger asserted that "if he keeps fit he still has a chance to come back to the top level. I think a hungry Nicklas Bendtner can score goals against anybody, and that's what you want from him."

On 11 December 2016, Bendtner scored an own goal against Forest's rivals Derby County in an eventual 3–0 defeat.

Bendtner finished his Forest career with two goals from seventeen appearances in all competitions. Bendtner felt that his heart wasn't really in it when he moved to Forest, and felt that 'It wasn't until I got to Rosenborg that I found myself again and found that true love of football'.

=== Rosenborg BK ===
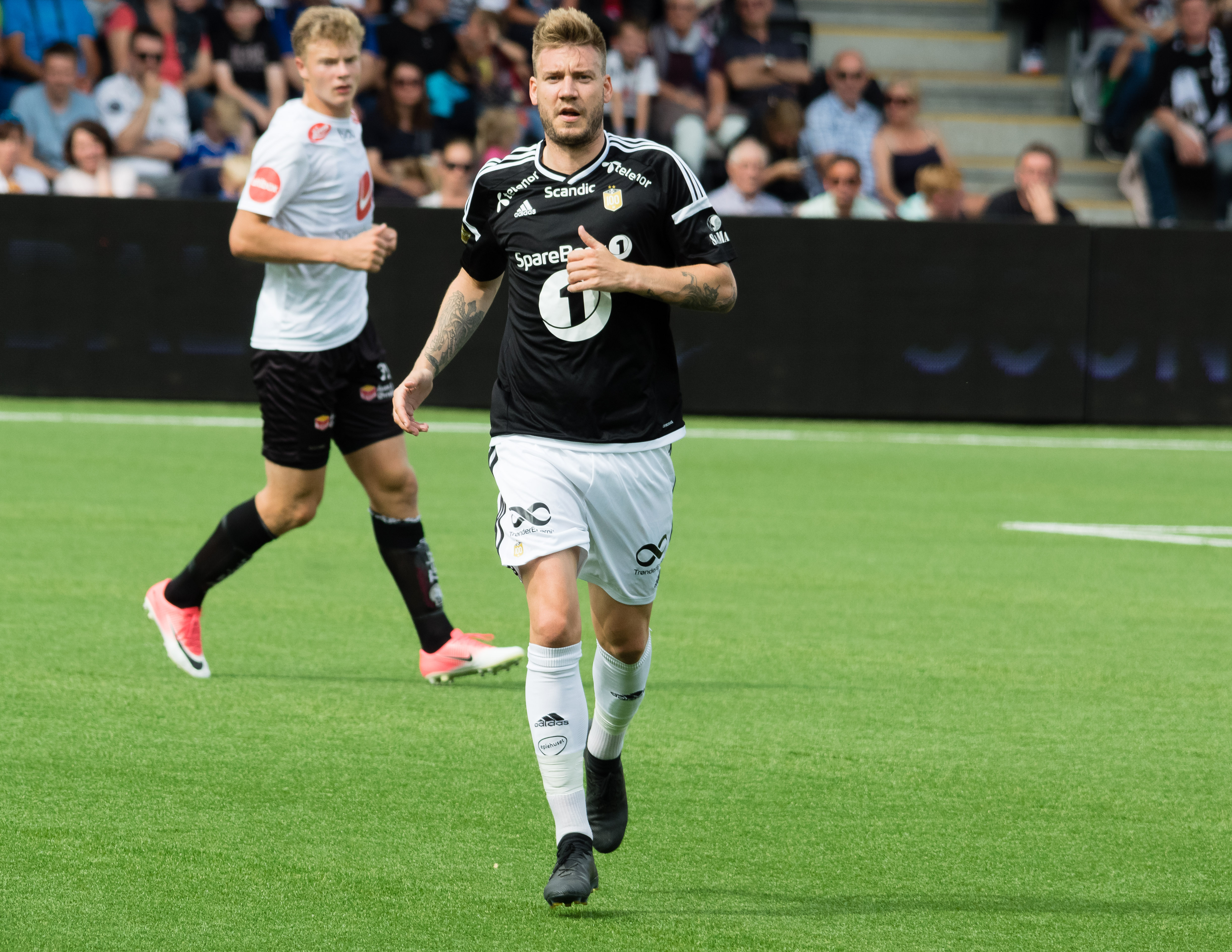
Bendtner playing for Rosenborg against Sogndal in 2017

On 6 March 2017, Bendtner signed for Norwegian club Rosenborg for an undisclosed fee. He made his debut as a second-half substitute in the Mesterfinalen of 2017 against Brann, and supplied the assist for the second goal in a 2–0 win. He also scored his first league goal in his Eliteserien debut against Odds at Lerkendal. On 12 August, Bendtner scored a trivela goal from outside the penalty box in a 2–1 win over Molde FK.

Bendtner won his second consecutive Mesterfinalen in the 2018 event, scoring the only goal of the game against Lillestrøm, nutmegging defender Marius Amundsen en route to goal.

=== Copenhagen ===
On the transfer deadline day, 2 September 2019, F.C. Copenhagen signed Bendtner on a deal until the end of the year. On 17 December 2019 it was confirmed, that Copenhagen would not extend his contract and Bendtner left the club again at the end of 2019. He scored his only goal in a cup game against FC Nordsjælland on 31 October 2019.

=== Retirement ===
On 25 August 2020, Tårnby FF, whose senior team competes in the fourth-tier Denmark Series, announced that Bendtner had signed up for the club, where he would become part of the "M+32 Old Boys" team. On Bendtner joining the team, organiser of the M+32 team, Martin Skov Hæstrup stated that "we are very happy that Nicklas wants to stay in shape with some of the guys he has known for many years. This opportunity is something we have been discussing for many years." He made his debut for the team on 9 September where he started as an attacking midfielder against the Fredensborg BI M+32 team which ended in a 1–0 win.

In June 2021, Bendtner announced his retirement from football in the Discovery+ programme Bendtner og Philine. In the episode, he stated that: "all your life you play football, and from one day to the next it ends", and added that he had "not been able to do some of the things I liked because of corona. I think I need to have a little more time to process that it's over now".

== International career ==
=== Youth ===
Bendtner started his international career with three matches for the Denmark under-16 team in February 2004. During his third game he scored a hat-trick against Armenia. He then scored six goals in 15 appearances for the under-17s, and was named Danish Under-17 Player of the Year for 2004.

Bendtner made his under-21 debut on 17 May 2006, at the age of 18, scoring both goals in a Danish 2–0 victory over Spain in a friendly match. He was the youngest player selected for Denmark's squad for the 2006 European Under-21 Championships, and replaced Morten "Duncan" Rasmussen in the Danish starting line-up. When Rasmussen came on to replace Bendtner during the match against the Netherlands, Bendtner told the press afterwards that the change was a mistake and that he was a better striker than Rasmussen. He received a reprimand, apologised to his teammates, and retained the starting position for Denmark's remaining group match before they were eliminated.

=== Senior ===
==== Early career and UEFA Euro 2008 qualification ====
On 16 August 2006, Bendtner made his first senior appearance for Denmark; aged 18 years and 212 days, he was the seventh youngest debutant ever. He started the match, a friendly against Poland, and scored after 32 minutes, helping Denmark to a 2–0 win. On 1 September, he played his second senior match for his country, as a substitute in a friendly against Portugal. He scored the final goal in a 4–2 win for Denmark. Although he still qualified to play for the U21s, Bendtner soon earned a starting place for the senior team; he scored two goals in UEFA Euro 2008 qualifiers.

==== 2010 FIFA World Cup and UEFA Euro 2012 qualification ====
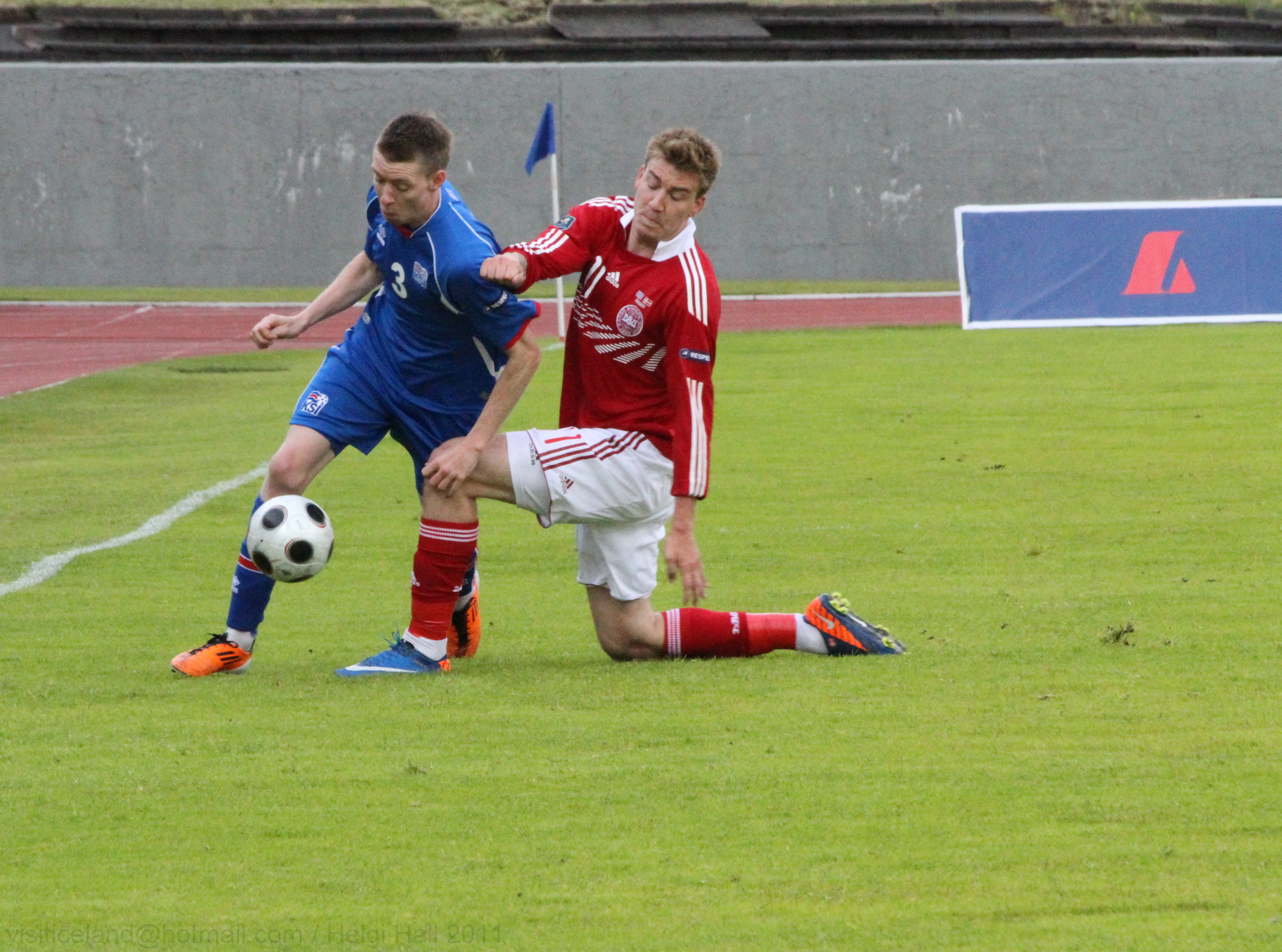
Bendtner (right) playing for Denmark against Iceland in 2011

In the 2010 World Cup qualifiers, Bendtner scored an 84th-minute goal against Portugal to make the score 1–1; Denmark went on to win 3–2. He scored again in the reverse fixture against Portugal which ended 1–1, and four days later scored a header against Albania in another 1–1 draw. He assisted Jakob Poulsen's goal in Denmark's 1–0 win over Sweden, which meant they qualified for the 2010 FIFA World Cup. He ended the campaign with three goals. For his contribution, he was voted Danish Player of the Year and his goal against Portugal won the Goal of the Year award. Bendtner was selected by coach Morten Olsen for the World Cup squad. He played in all three of Denmark's group matches, and scored his country's first goal of the 2–1 win against Cameroon.

Bendtner turned down the opportunity of representing his country at the 2011 European Under-21 Championships because he wanted to "spend some quality time with [his] young son". In qualifying for UEFA Euro 2012, he scored two goals for the senior team in a 2–0 win against Norway on 6 September 2011. On 11 October, he scored a "second-half tap-in" against Portugal to ensure Denmark qualified for Euro 2012. In friendlies in November, Bendtner scored against both Sweden and Finland; in the latter match, he "finished a fine counterattacking move to net the winning goal".

==== UEFA Euro 2012 ====
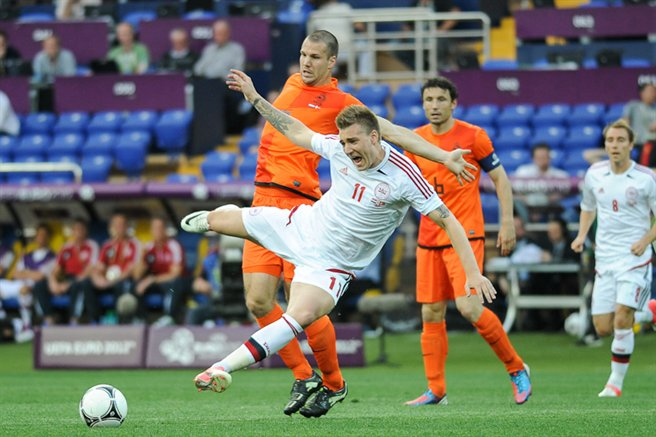
Bendtner in action against the Netherlands at UEFA Euro 2012

Bendtner was selected in the Denmark squad for Euro 2012. A Sports Illustrated preview described him as "tall and powerful, capable of acting as a target man, yet also has the technical gifts to play deeper or on the flank." On 13 June, he scored twice in Denmark's narrow 3–2 defeat to Portugal in the second group match. After scoring his second goal, Bendtner revealed the logo of bookmakers Paddy Power on the waistband of his underwear, in an instance of ambush marketing for which UEFA banned him for one 2014 World Cup qualifying match and fined him €100,000. The company paid the fine. On 12 October 2012, he scored the equalising goal in a 1–1 draw with Bulgaria in a World Cup qualifier, and received a yellow card when playing against Italy four days later.

==== Suspension from the national team and UEFA Euro 2016 qualification ====
In March 2013, after Bendtner's arrest for drink driving, the Danish Football Association (DBU) suspended Bendtner from consideration for national team selection for six months. According to their statement: "The DBU have demanded that Nicklas Bendtner take six months off to think over his international future. The DBU respect the rights of all players to have a private life, but we also have certain rules that need to be met by international players in their public behaviour." On his next appearance, in the return fixture against Italy, he scored both of Denmark's goals in a 2–2 draw and was yellow-carded for removing his shirt in celebration. An ankle injury sustained on club duty with Arsenal resulted in Bendtner being sidelined from international football until a friendly against England at Wembley Stadium in March 2014, in which he played the first 63 minutes.

In the first round of international call-ups after Bendtner's transfer to Wolfsburg, he was left out of the Denmark squad by Morten Olsen, who named Martin Braithwaite as his sole striker for a friendly against Turkey and a Euro 2016 qualifier against Armenia. In March 2015, he scored a hat-trick as Denmark came from behind to beat the United States 3–2 in a friendly at Aarhus.

==== 2018 FIFA World Cup ====
Bendtner was named in Denmark's preliminary 35-man squad for the 2018 FIFA World Cup, and retained his place when the group was reduced to 27, but a groin injury sustained on club duty meant he was not included in the final 23.

== Style of play ==
Bendtner was a versatile forward capable of playing in several attacking positions. Although his preferred role was as a centre-forward, he has also been used out wide on either flank. A large, tall, and physically strong player, he was known for his ability in the air and possessed a powerful header.

Considered a promising but undisciplined player in his youth, he was regarded as "a player blessed with a fabulous all-round talent", and a quick, intelligent, and hard-working striker, with a good positional sense, first touch, tactical awareness, and an ability to score goals or hold up the ball and create chances.

His former Arsenal manager Arsène Wenger once labelled Bendtner as a potentially "unstoppable striker", and also described him as a player who as a youngster was "good in the air", and who had "good technique, good stature, good pace, ... good link play", also adding that "he had it all in the locker." Despite his talent and confidence in his abilities, Bendtner often struggled with injuries, which limited his fitness; he was also criticised in the media for his perceived arrogance, mentality, and inconsistency, as well as his off-field antics, and as a result, he has been accused of failing to live up to his potential.

== Personal life ==
In November 2009, Bendtner was seen in Hyde Park with former Baroness Caroline Iuel-Brockdorff, a socialite and close friend of the Danish royal family. The couple met when Iuel-Brockdorff was filmed renovating her family home, Valdemar's Castle, on a reality show. Bendtner was a guest and they did a photoshoot together to promote his appearance. In December 2010, Iuel-Brockdorff gave birth to Bendtner's son at London's Portland Hospital. The couple separated soon afterwards.

Bendtner has a cult following who refer to him as "Lord Bendtner". In March 2015, Danish celebrity tabloid Se og Hør bought him a square foot of land in Scotland to bestow him the title of "Lord", and according to his agent, he considered it a "fun gimmick". Bendtner has also taken part in the joke, uploading on Instagram a poster of him holding the Ballon d'Or and running as a candidate for Prime Minister in the June 2015 Danish election. During his time at Rosenborg, Bendtner was dubbed "Emperor" as Mushaga Bakenga was already nicknamed "Lord" at Rosenborg.

In November 2018, Bendtner was sentenced to 50 days in prison in Denmark for assaulting a taxi driver. On 21 November, Bendtner and his lawyer dropped the appeal, accepting that Bendtner will serve his sentence either in jail or house arrest.

During the COVID-19 pandemic, Bendtner began playing Counter-Strike: Global Offensive, and became the owner of a small CSGO team called Prosapia Esport. In November 2022, he participated in a showmatch at the BLAST Premier Fall Finals at the Royal Arena in Copenhagen, playing on Team Denmark.

== Career statistics ==
=== Club ===
Appearances and goals by club, season and competition
Club	Season	League			National cup (Note: Includes FA Cup, Coppa Italia, DFB-Pokal, Norwegian Football Cup, Danish Cup)		League cup (Note: Includes Football League/EFL Cup)		Europe		Other		Total	
Club	Season	Division	Apps	Goals	Apps	Goals	Apps	Goals	Apps	Goals	Apps	Goals	Apps	Goals
Arsenal	2005–06	Premier League	0	0	0	0	3	0	0	0	0	0	3	0
Arsenal	2007–08	Premier League	27	5	2	1	5	1	6 (Note: Appearance(s) in UEFA Champions League)	2	—		40	9
Arsenal	2008–09	Premier League	31	9	5	2	2	2	12	2	—		50	15
Arsenal	2009–10	Premier League	23	6	0	0	1	1	7	5	—		31	12
Arsenal	2010–11	Premier League	17	2	5	4	5	3	5	0	—		32	9
Arsenal	2011–12	Premier League	1	0	—		0	0	0	0	—		1	0
Arsenal	2013–14	Premier League	9	2	1	0	2	0	2	0	—		14	2
Arsenal	Total		108	24	13	7	18	7	32	9	0	0	171	47
Birmingham City (loan)	2006–07	Championship	42	11	2	0	4	2	—		—		48	13
Sunderland (loan)	2011–12	Premier League	28	8	2	0	—		—		—		30	8
Juventus (loan)	2012–13	Serie A	9	0	1	0	—		1	0	—		11	0
VfL Wolfsburg	2014–15	Bundesliga	18	1	2	0	—		8 (Note: Appearance(s) in UEFA Europa League)	4	—		28	5
VfL Wolfsburg	2015–16	Bundesliga	13	2	1	1	—		4	0	1 (Note: Appearance in DFL-Supercup)	1	19	4
VfL Wolfsburg	Total		31	3	3	1	—		12	4	1	1	47	9
Nottingham Forest	2016–17	Championship	15	2	1	0	1	0	—		—		17	2
Rosenborg	2017	Eliteserien	29	19	2	0	—		12 (Note: Four appearances in UEFA Champions League, eight appearances and four goals in UEFA Europa League)	4	1 (Note: Appearance in Mesterfinalen)	0	44	23
Rosenborg	2018	Eliteserien	23	5	2	3	—		11 (Note: Four appearances and two goals in UEFA Champions League, seven appearances and one goal in UEFA Europa League)	3	1	1	37	12
Rosenborg	2019	Eliteserien	5	0	0	0	—		0	0	0	0	5	0
Rosenborg	Total		57	24	4	3	—		23	7	2	1	86	35
Copenhagen	2019–20	Danish Superliga	6	0	2	1	—		1	0	—		9	1
Career total			296	72	28	12	23	9	69	20	3	2	419	115

=== International ===
Appearances and goals by national team and year
National team	Year	Apps	Goals
Denmark	2006	4	2
Denmark	2007	10	3
Denmark	2008	8	3
Denmark	2009	9	2
Denmark	2010	4	2
Denmark	2011	10	5
Denmark	2012	10	5
Denmark	2013	2	2
Denmark	2014	7	2
Denmark	2015	10	3
Denmark	2016	0	0
Denmark	2017	5	1
Denmark	2018	2	0
Total		81	30

Scores and results list Denmark's goal tally first, score column indicates score after each Bendtner goal.

List of international goals scored by Nicklas Bendtner
No.	Cap	Date	Venue	Opponent	Score	Result	Competition
1	1	16 August 2006	Odense Stadium, Odense, Denmark	Poland	1–0	2–0	Friendly
2	2	1 September 2006	Brøndby Stadion, Brøndbyvester, Denmark	Portugal	4–2	4–2	Friendly
3	6	28 March 2007	MSV-Arena, Duisburg, Germany	Germany	1–0	1–0	Friendly
4	13	17 November 2007	Windsor Park, Belfast, Northern Ireland	Northern Ireland	1–0	1–2	UEFA Euro 2008 qualification
5	14	21 November 2007	Parken Stadium, Copenhagen, Denmark	Iceland	1–0	3–0	UEFA Euro 2008 qualification
6	15	26 February 2008	Športni Park, Nova Gorica, Slovenia	Slovenia	2–1	2–1	Friendly
7	16	26 March 2008	MCH Arena, Herning, Denmark	Czech Republic	1–0	1–1	Friendly
8	21	10 September 2008	Estádio José Alvalade, Lisbon, Portugal	Portugal	1–1	3–2	2010 FIFA World Cup qualification
9	28	5 September 2009	Parken Stadium, Copenhagen, Denmark	Portugal	1–0	1–1	2010 FIFA World Cup qualification
10	29	9 September 2009	Qemal Stafa Stadium, Tirana, Albania	Albania	1–0	1–1	2010 FIFA World Cup qualification
11	32	3 March 2010	Ernst-Happel-Stadion, Vienna, Austria	Austria	1–1	1–2	Friendly
12	34	19 June 2010	Loftus Versfeld Stadium, Pretoria, South Africa	Cameroon	1–1	2–1	2010 FIFA World Cup
13	41	6 September 2011	Parken Stadium, Copenhagen, Denmark	Norway	1–0	2–0	UEFA Euro 2012 qualification
14	41	6 September 2011	Parken Stadium, Copenhagen, Denmark	Norway	2–0	2–0	UEFA Euro 2012 qualification
15	43	11 October 2011	Parken Stadium, Copenhagen, Denmark	Portugal	2–0	2–1	UEFA Euro 2012 qualification
16	44	11 November 2011	Parken Stadium, Copenhagen, Denmark	Sweden	1–0	2–0	Friendly
17	45	15 November 2011	Blue Water Arena, Esbjerg, Denmark	Finland	2–1	2–1	Friendly
18	47	26 May 2012	Imtech Arena, Hamburg, Germany	Brazil	1–3	1–3	Friendly
19	50	13 June 2012	Arena Lviv, Lviv, Ukraine	Portugal	1–2	2–3	UEFA Euro 2012
20	50	13 June 2012	Arena Lviv, Lviv, Ukraine	Portugal	2–2	2–3	UEFA Euro 2012
21	53	12 October 2012	Vasil Levski National Stadium, Sofia, Bulgaria	Bulgaria	1–1	1–1	2014 FIFA World Cup qualification
22	55	14 November 2012	Türk Telekom Arena, Istanbul, Turkey	Turkey	1–0	1–1	Friendly
23	56	11 October 2013	Parken Stadium, Copenhagen, Denmark	Italy	1–1	2–2	2014 FIFA World Cup qualification
24	56	11 October 2013	Parken Stadium, Copenhagen, Denmark	Italy	2–1	2–2	2014 FIFA World Cup qualification
25	63	14 November 2014	Partizan Stadium, Belgrade, Serbia	Serbia	1–1	3–1	UEFA Euro 2016 qualification
26	63	14 November 2014	Partizan Stadium, Belgrade, Serbia	Serbia	3–1	3–1	UEFA Euro 2016 qualification
27	65	25 March 2015	NRGi Park, Aarhus, Denmark	United States	1–1	3–2	Friendly
28	65	25 March 2015	NRGi Park, Aarhus, Denmark	United States	2–2	3–2	Friendly
29	65	25 March 2015	NRGi Park, Aarhus, Denmark	United States	3–2	3–2	Friendly
30	79	14 November 2017	Aviva Stadium, Dublin, Ireland	Republic of Ireland	5–1	5–1	2018 FIFA World Cup qualification

== Honours ==
Birmingham City

- Football League Championship runner-up: 2006–07

Arsenal

- Football League Cup runner-up: 2010–11

Juventus

- Serie A: 2012–13

VfL Wolfsburg

- DFB-Pokal: 2014–15
- DFL-Supercup: 2015

Rosenborg

- Eliteserien: 2017, 2018
- Norwegian Football Cup: 2018
- Mesterfinalen: 2017, 2018

Individual

- Danish Under-17 Player of the Year: 2004
- Danish Talent of the Year: 2007
- Danish Football Player of the Year: 2009
- Danish Goal of the Year: 2009
- Eliteserien top scorer: 2017
