= Anders Trondsen =

Norwegian footballer (born 1995)

Personal information
- Full name: Anders Trondsen
- Date of birth: 30 March 1995 (age 31)
- Place of birth: Lillehammer, Norway
- Height: 1.83 m (6 ft 0 in)
- Positions: Left-back; central midfielder

Team information
- Current team: HamKam
- Number: 16

Youth career
- –2011: Lillehammer
- 2011: Stabæk

Senior career*
Years	Team	Apps	(Gls)
2011	Lillehammer	1	(0)
2012–2014	Stabæk 2	16	(0)
2012–2014	Stabæk	55	(4)
2015–2017	Sarpsborg 08	64	(4)
2017–2020	Rosenborg	69	(5)
2020–2022	Trabzonspor	11	(0)
2023–2025	IFK Göteborg	48	(0)
2025	→ Sarpsborg 08 (loan)	7	(0)
2026–	HamKam	10	(1)

International career
2010	Norway U15	3	(0)
2011	Norway U16	11	(0)
2012	Norway U17	11	(1)
2012–2013	Norway U18	10	(0)
2014	Norway U19	4	(0)
2014–2016	Norway U21	14	(1)
2016–2017	Norway	4	(0)
- * Club domestic league appearances and goals as of 23 July 2026

Anders Trondsen (born 30 March 1995) is a Norwegian professional footballer who plays as a left-back and central midfielder who plays for HamKam.

== Club career ==
Trondsen made his debut for Lillehammer FK in the 2011 Norwegian Second Division. In the autumn of 2011, he moved to attend the Norwegian College of Elite Sport in Bærum and play for Stabæk Fotball's youth team. He made his senior league debut for Stabæk in the loss against SK Brann in August 2012.

Trondsen signed for Sarpsborg 08 on 5 March 2015. On 14 August 2017, he signed for Rosenborg BK. He signed for Trabzonspor on 7 August 2020. In November 2022, Trondsen signed a contract with IFK Gothenburg until 2026.

== International career ==
Trondsen debuted for the Norway national football team against Portugal on 29 May 2016.

== Career statistics ==
=== Club ===
As of match played 11 August 2025

Appearances and goals by club, season and competition
Club	Season	League			National Cup		Europe		Total	
Club	Season	Division	Apps	Goals	Apps	Goals	Apps	Goals	Apps	Goals
Lillehammer	2011	2. divisjon	1	0	0	0	–		1	0
Stabæk	2012	Tippeligaen	3	0	0	0	–		3	0
Stabæk	2013	1. divisjon	26	3	4	0	–		30	3
Stabæk	2014	Tippeligaen	26	1	4	0	–		30	1
Stabæk	Total		55	4	8	0	–		63	4
Sarpsborg 08	2015	Tippeligaen	24	1	5	1	–		29	2
Sarpsborg 08	2016	Tippeligaen	22	1	4	0	–		6	1
Sarpsborg 08	2017	Eliteserien	18	2	3	2	–		21	4
Sarpsborg 08	Total		64	4	12	3	–		76	7
Rosenborg	2017	Eliteserien	10	2	1	0	6	0	17	2
Rosenborg	2018	Eliteserien	24	2	5	1	9	2	38	5
Rosenborg	2019	Eliteserien	22	0	3	0	11	0	36	0
Rosenborg	2020	Eliteserien	13	1	0	0	0	0	13	1
Rosenborg	Total		69	5	9	1	26	2	104	8
Trabzonspor	2020–21	Süper Lig	0	0	0	0	–		0	0
Trabzonspor	2021–22	Süper Lig	11	0	0	0	3 (Note: Appearances in UEFA Europa Conference League)	0	14	0
Trabzonspor	Total		11	0	0	0	3	0	14	0
IFK Göteborg	2023	Allsvenskan	12	0	1	0	–		13	0
IFK Göteborg	2024	Allsvenskan	26	0	4	0	–		30	0
IFK Göteborg	2025	Allsvenskan	10	0	4	0	–		14	0
IFK Göteborg	Total		48	0	9	0	0	0	57	0
Sarpsborg 08 (loan)	2025	Eliteserien	0	0	0	0	–		0	0
Career total			248	13	37	4	29	2	314	19

== Honours ==
=== Club ===
Rosenborg

- Eliteserien: 2017, 2018
- Norwegian Football Cup: 2018

Trabzonspor

- Süper Lig: 2021–22
