= Đorđe Denić =

Serbian footballer

Personal information
- Date of birth: 1 April 1996 (age 30)
- Place of birth: Belgrade, FR Yugoslavia
- Height: 1.82 m (6 ft 0 in)
- Position: Midfielder

Team information
- Current team: Mardin 1969
- Number: 8

Youth career
- Partizan
- 2009–2015: Rad

Senior career*
Years	Team	Apps	(Gls)
2013–2018	Rad	86	(9)
2015–2016	→ Žarkovo (loan)	9	(5)
2018–2020	Rosenborg	17	(0)
2020	→ Apollon Limassol (loan)	21	(1)
2021–2022	Apollon Limassol	19	(0)
2021–2022	→ Atromitos (loan)	29	(1)
2022–2023	Mladost Novi Sad	25	(1)
2023–2024	Henan FC	40	(5)
2025–2026	Pendikspor	50	(4)
2026–	Mardin 1969	14	(0)

International career^{‡}
2012	Serbia U16	2	(1)
2012	Serbia U17	2	(0)
2016	Serbia U20	1	(0)
2017–2018	Serbia U21	4	(1)
- * Club domestic league appearances and goals as of 8 November 2026 ‡ National team caps and goals as of 13 August 2018

Đorđe Denić (Serbian Cyrillic: Ђорђе Денић; born 1 April 1996) is a Serbian professional footballer who plays as a midfielder for Turkish TFF 1. Lig club Mardin 1969. He has played for Rad, Žarkovo, Rosenborg, Apollon Limassol, Atromitos, Mladost Novi Sad, Henan FC and Pendikspor.

== Club career ==
=== Rad ===
Denić made his professional debut for Rad on 1 September 2013, in a SuperLiga match against Partizan at their stadium. He was substituted in for Andrija Luković in 80th minute, after which Rad lost 3-1. He was loaned to Žarkovo on dual registration until the end of first half the 2015–16 season.

=== Rosenborg ===
Denić signed for Norwegian side Rosenborg on 13 August 2018 on a three-and-a-half-year contract.

=== Henan FC ===
On 30 July 2023, Denić signed with Chinese Super League club Henan FC.

== Career statistics ==
=== Club ===
As of match played 4 November 2023

Appearances and goals by club, season and competition
Club	Season	League			National Cup		Europe		Other		Total	
Club	Season	Division	Apps	Goals	Apps	Goals	Apps	Goals	Apps	Goals	Apps	Goals
Rad	2013–14	Serbian SuperLiga	1	0	0	0	—		—		1	0
Rad	2014–15	Serbian SuperLiga	8	0	0	0	—		—		8	0
Rad	2015–16	Serbian SuperLiga	24	1	1	0	—		—		25	1
Rad	2016–17	Serbian SuperLiga	19	2	2	0	—		—		21	2
Rad	2017–18	Serbian SuperLiga	33	5	1	0	—		—		34	5
Rad	2018–19	Serbian SuperLiga	1	1	0	0	—		—		1	1
Rad	Total		86	9	4	0	—		—		90	9
Žarkovo (loan)	2015–16	League Belgrade	9	5	0	0	—		—		9	5
Žarkovo (loan)	Total		9	5	0	0	—		—		9	5
Rosenborg	2018	Eliteserien	8	0	1	1	8	0	—		17	1
Rosenborg	2019	Eliteserien	9	0	4	0	—		—		13	0
Rosenborg	Total		17	0	5	1	8	0	—		30	1
Apollon Limassol (loan)	2019–20	Cypriot First Division	7	0	4	0	—		—		11	0
Apollon Limassol (loan)	2020–21	Cypriot First Division	14	1	0	0	3	0	—		17	1
Apollon Limassol (loan)	Total		21	1	4	0	3	0	—		28	1
Apollon Limassol	2020–21	Cypriot First Division	19	0	0	0	—		—		19	0
Apollon Limassol	2021–22	Cypriot First Division	—		—		2	0	—		2	0
Apollon Limassol	Total		19	0	0	0	2	0	—		21	0
Atromitos (Ioan)	2021–22	Super League Greece	29	1	1	0	—		—		30	1
Mladost Novi Sad	2022–23	Serbian SuperLiga	25	1	1	0	—		—		26	1
Henan FC	2023	Chinese Super League	11	3	0	0	—		—		11	3
Career total			217	20	16	1	13	0	0	0	246	21
