= Birger Meling =

Norwegian footballer (born 1994)

- Meling in 2026 with Copenhagen

Personal information
- Full name: Birger Solberg Meling
- Date of birth: 17 December 1994 (age 31)
- Place of birth: Stavanger, Norway
- Height: 1.73 m (5 ft 8 in)
- Position: Left-back

Team information
- Current team: Copenhagen
- Number: 24

Youth career
- 2000–2013: Viking
- 2013–2014: Middlesbrough

Senior career*
Years	Team	Apps	(Gls)
2014–2016	Stabæk	59	(5)
2017–2020	Rosenborg	79	(1)
2020–2021	Nîmes	26	(2)
2021–2023	Rennes	59	(0)
2023–	Copenhagen	56	(5)

International career^{‡}
2015–2016	Norway U21	6	(0)
2017–2023	Norway	39	(0)
- * Club domestic league appearances and goals as of 26 October 2026 ‡ National team caps and goals as of 5 January 2024

Birger Solberg Meling (born 17 December 1994) is a Norwegian professional footballer who plays as a left-back for Danish Superliga club Copenhagen, and the Norway national football team.

== Club career ==
=== Early career ===
After playing youth football for Viking and Middlesbrough, Meling joined Stabæk before the 2014 season. He made his senior league debut in September 2014 in a 3–0 defeat against Aalesund. In February 2017, he signed for Rosenborg.

=== Nîmes ===
In July 2020, Meling joined Nîmes on a three-year contract. The transfer fee paid to Rosenborg was less than €1 million. On his Ligue 1 debut on the season's first matchday, he contributed an assist and a goal in Nîmes's 4–0 win against Brest.

=== Copenhagen ===
On 14 August 2023, Meling signed a contract with the Danish champions Copenhagen until the summer of 2027.

== Career statistics ==
=== Club ===
As of match played 29 October 2026

Appearances and goals by club, season and competition
Club	Season	League			Cup		Europe		Other		Total	
Club	Season	Division	Apps	Goals	Apps	Goals	Apps	Goals	Apps	Goals	Apps	Goals
Stabæk	2014	Eliteserien	2	0	0	0	—		—		2	0
Stabæk	2015	Eliteserien	27	1	5	0	—		—		32	1
Stabæk	2016	Eliteserien	30	4	3	1	2 (Note: Appearances in UEFA Europa League)	0	2 (Note: Appearances in the 2016 Eliteserien playoffs)	0	37	5
Stabæk	Total		59	5	8	1	2	0	2	0	71	6
Rosenborg	2017	Eliteserien	20	0	5	1	11 (Note: Three appearances in UEFA Champions League, eight appearances in UEFA Europa League)	0	—		36	1
Rosenborg	2018	Eliteserien	28	1	6	0	12 (Note: Four appearances and one goal in UEFA Champions League, eight appearances in UEFA Europa League)	1	—		46	2
Rosenborg	2019	Eliteserien	28	0	2	1	14 (Note: Eight appearances and one goal in UEFA Champions League, six appearances in UEFA Europa League)	0	—		44	1
Rosenborg	2020	Eliteserien	3	0	—		0	0	—		3	0
Rosenborg	Total		79	1	13	2	37	1	—		129	4
Nîmes	2020–21	Ligue 1	26	2	0	0	—		—		26	2
Rennes	2021–22	Ligue 1	31	0	0	0	6 (Note: Appearances in UEFA Europa Conference League)	0	—		37	0
Rennes	2022–23	Ligue 1	16	0	1	0	5	0	—		22	0
Rennes	Total		47	0	1	0	11	0	—		59	0
Copenhagen	2023–24	Superliga	19	0	0	0	5 (Note: Appearances in UEFA Champions League)	0	—		24	0
Copenhagen	2024–25	Danish Superliga	10	0	1	0	8	0	—		19	0
Copenhagen	2025–26	Danish Superliga	17	0	4	0	8	0	–		29	0
Copenhagen	2026–27	Danish Superliga	10	5	1	0	5	0	–		16	5
Copenhagen	Total		56	5	6	0	26	0	—		88	5
Career total			267	13	28	5	76	1	2	0	373	18

=== International ===
As of 20 June 2023

Appearances and goals by national team and year
National team	Year	Apps	Goals
Norway	2017	4	0
Norway	2018	6	0
Norway	2019	1	0
Norway	2020	3	0
Norway	2021	12	0
Norway	2022	7	0
Norway	2023	4	0
Total		37	0

== Honours ==
Rosenborg

- Norwegian League: 2017, 2018
- Norwegian Football Cup: 2018

Copenhagen

- Danish Superliga: 2024–25
- Danish Cup: 2024–25
