= 2018 Norwegian Football Cup =

Tournament details
- Country: Norway
- Teams: 272 (overall); 128 (main competition)

Final positions
- Champions: Rosenborg (12th title)
- Runners-up: Strømsgodset

Tournament statistics
- Matches played: 127
- Goals scored: 414 (3.26 per match)
- Top goal scorer(s): Mustafa Abdellaoue (8 goals)

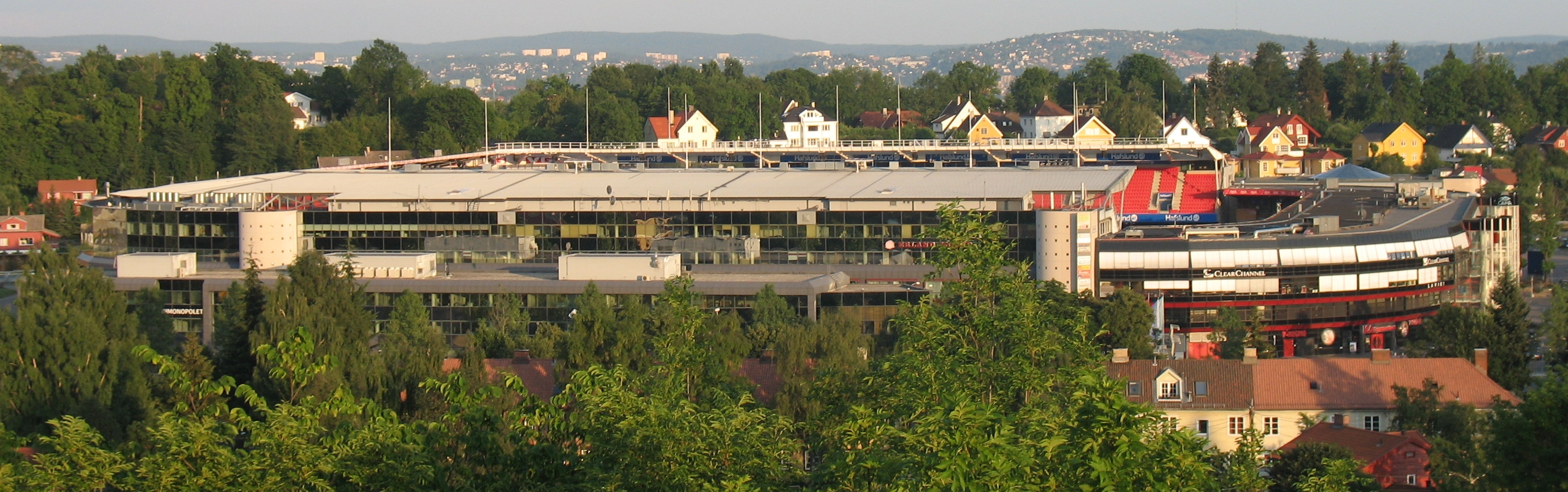
Ullevaal Stadion, Oslo - venue for the Norwegian Cup final

The 2018 Norwegian Football Cup was the 113th edition of the Norwegian annual knock-out football tournament. It began with qualification matches in March and April 2018. The first round was played from 17–19 April 2018 and the tournament concluded with the final on 2 December 2018.

Rosenborg won their twelfth Cup title. The victory would have earned them a place in the first qualifying round of the 2019–20 UEFA Europa League, but since the club already had qualified to the 2019–20 UEFA Champions League as winners of the 2018 Eliteserien, this berth was passed down to Haugesund, fourth-place finishers in the league.

== Calendar ==
Below are the dates for each round as given by the official schedule:

Round	Main date	Number of fixtures	Clubs
First Qualifying Round	3 March – 2 April 2018	88	176
Second Qualifying Round	2–7 April 2018	44	88
First Round	17–19 April 2018	64	128
Second Round	1–3 May 2018	32	64
Third Round	9–10 May 2018	16	32
Fourth Round	30 May – 14 June 2018	8	16
Quarter-finals	26–27 September 2018	4	8
Semi-finals	31 October 2018	2	4
Final	2 December 2018	1	2

== First round ==
Number of teams per tier entering this round
Eliteserien (1)	1. divisjon (2)	2. divisjon (3)	3. divisjon (4)	4. divisjon (5)	Total
16 / 16	16 / 16	25 / 28	49 / 84	22 / 298	128 / 442

17 April 2018	Moss (3)	4–0	(4) Kråkerøy	Moss
18:00 CEST (UTC+2)	Reinback 25', 37'; Aarstrand 80', 90'	Report		Stadium: Melløs Stadion; Attendance: 190; Referee: Stian Røvig Sletner

18 April 2018	Bjørnevatn (4)	0–3	(3) Alta	Bjørnevatn
16:00 CEST (UTC+2)		Report	Mannsverk 52'; Hansen 62'; Hanssen 84'	Stadium: Bjørneparken; Attendance: 200; Referee: Shervin Enger Heydary

18 April 2018	Harstad (4)	5–3 (a.e.t.)	(5) Mosjøen	Harstad
16:30 CEST (UTC+2)	Framvik 82', 94'; Andersen 84', 101'; Košutić 118'	Report	Høgseth 55', 90', 116'	Stadium: Harstad stadion Attendance: 120; Referee: Ole Ragnar Jansen Knutsen

18 April 2018	Kvik Halden (4)	0–4	(3) Fredrikstad	Halden
18:00 CEST (UTC+2)		Report	Nielsen 3'; Nilsen 42'; Chaib 65'; Begby 90'	Stadium: Halden Stadion; Attendance: 534; Referee: Sebastian Vegstein Mikalsen

18 April 2018	Østsiden (4)	2–9	(1) Sarpsborg 08	Fredrikstad
18:00 CEST (UTC+2)	Cham 45'; Skårn 83'	Report	Muhammed 5'; Tveter 8', 59'; Usman 24'; Larsen 30'; Heintz 33', 35'; Østli 43'; Lunde 75'	Stadium: Østfoldhallen; Attendance: 300; Referee: Ajdin Medic

18 April 2018	Årvoll (5)	0–8	(1) Vålerenga	Oslo
18:00 CEST (UTC+2)		Report	Meira 31'; Juklerød 34', 37'; Azemi 39', 47'; Finne 40'; Michael 52'; Borchgrevink 83'	Stadium: Årvoll Kunstgress; Attendance: 2,678; Referee: Per Erik Haugen

18 April 2018	Ullern (4)	3–5 (a.e.t.)	(1) Stabæk	Oslo
18:00 CEST (UTC+2)	Bergstrøm 11', 13'; Rosvoll 112'	Report	Boli 87', 117'; Omoijuanfo 89'; Brynhildsen 96'; Ovenstad 98'	Stadium: Ullernbanen; Attendance: 1,238; Referee: Magnus Koløy

18 April 2018	Frigg Oslo (4)	0–3	(2) Strømmen	Oslo
18:00 CEST (UTC+2)		Report	Pedersen 19'; Lange 72'; Mauritz-Hansen 90+1'	Stadium: Frogner stadion Attendance: 100; Referee: Mohammad Hafezi

18 April 2018	Lommedalen (5)	0–2	(3) Skeid	Lommedalen
18:00 CEST (UTC+2)		Report	Pettersen 45'; Can 90+5'	Stadium: Lommedalen Kunstgress; Referee: Ole-Alexander Ekeli Valen

18 April 2018	Korsvoll (4)	0–1	(4) Lørenskog	Oslo
18:00 CEST (UTC+2)		Report	Romøren 67'	Stadium: Korsvollbanen; Attendance: 121; Referee: Emilie Rodahl Torkelsen

18 April 2018	Oppsal (4)	0–4	(2) Kongsvinger	Oslo
18:00 CEST (UTC+2)		Report	Lundal 16'; Güven 42', 56'; Ibrahim 63'	Stadium: Oppsal Arena; Attendance: 268; Referee: Sulman Hussain

18 April 2018	Bærum (3)	2–1	(4) Drøbak-Frogn	Sandvika
18:00 CEST (UTC+2)	Rønning 23'; Llullaku 62'	Report	Grønli 87'	Stadium: Sandvika Stadion; Referee: Satha Sejoohn Sritharan

18 April 2018	Kløfta (5)	0–3	(1) Lillestrøm	Kløfta
18:00 CEST (UTC+2)		Report	Brenden 19'; Olsen 29'; Mathew 76'	Stadium: Bakkedalen; Attendance: 1,750; Referee: Eivind Bodding

18 April 2018	Gjelleråsen (4)	0–3	(2) Ullensaker/Kisa	Slattum (Nittedal)
18:00 CEST (UTC+2)		Report	Abshir 13'; Nesset 24'; Kristiansen 82'	Stadium: Li kunstgress Attendance: 278; Referee: Anders Bodding

18 April 2018	Eidsvold (4)	1–3	(3) Kjelsås	Eidsvoll
18:00 CEST (UTC+2)	Teigland 53'	Report	Becerra 2'; Taaje 47'; Solli 84'	Stadium: Myhrer stadion Attendance: 110; Referee: Marius Bye

18 April 2018	Grorud (3)	2–0	(4) Tønsberg	Oslo
18:00 CEST (UTC+2)	Ahmed 50'; Pettersen 66'	Report		Stadium: Grorud matchbane Attendance: 210; Referee: Hakan Catalgøl

18 April 2018	Asker (3)	5–0	(4) Follo	Asker
18:00 CEST (UTC+2)	Sanyang 14', 50'; Bencsik 28'; Celina 66', 84'	Report		Stadium: Føyka Stadion; Attendance: 153; Referee: Herman Holthe

18 April 2018	Raufoss (3)	6–0	(4) Skjetten	Raufoss
18:00 CEST (UTC+2)	Henningsson 16'; Moldskred 23', 41'; Owusu 49', 74'; Doghman 66'	Report		Stadium: NAMMO Stadion; Attendance: 410; Referee: Jørgen Haugen

18 April 2018	Nybergsund (3)	0–1	(3) Elverum	Nybergsund
18:00 CEST (UTC+2)		Report	Tøråsen 46'	Stadium: Nybergsund Stadium; Attendance: 226; Referee: Ali Al-Hatem

18 April 2018	Vestfossen (4)	1–4	(1) Strømsgodset	Vestfossen
18:00 CEST (UTC+2)	Torgersen 62'	Report	Abdellaoue 8', 54'; Pellegrino 58'; Andersen 79'	Stadium: Strandajordet kunstgress Attendance: 850; Referee: Mohammad Usman Aslam

18 April 2018	Lillehammer (5)	0–2	(3) Hønefoss	Lillehammer
18:00 CEST (UTC+2)		Report	Østebø 50'; Thorberg 77'	Stadium: Stampesletta; Attendance: 164; Referee: Johan William Grundt

18 April 2018	Ørn-Horten (4)	3–1	(4) Lyn	Horten
18:00 CEST (UTC+2)	Johansen 35', 63'; Brovina 65'	Report	Ifejilika 54'	Stadium: Lystlunden; Referee: Nedim Brbovic

18 April 2018	Eik-Tønsberg (5)	1–6	(1) Sandefjord	Eik
18:00 CEST (UTC+2)	Gulliksen 41'	Report	Foss 12'; Kastrati 34', 44'; Engblom 49'; Ofkir 88'; Mjelde 88'	Stadium: Eikbanen; Attendance: 711; Referee: Harald Magnus Børresen

18 April 2018	Flint (5)	2–4 (a.e.t.)	(2) Mjøndalen	Tønsberg
18:00 CEST (UTC+2)	Krysian 50'; Høyem 82'	Report	Scriven 20'; Hansen 53'; Lindseth 109'; Ibrahimaj 120'	Stadium: Løveid kunstgress Referee: Hans Kristian Pedersen

18 April 2018	Halsen (4)	0–4	(3) Fram Larvik	Larvik
18:00 CEST (UTC+2)		Report	Rugland 22' (pen.), 26'; Laham 82'; Beugré 85'	Stadium: Bergeskogen KG; Referee: Mohammad Nabhani

18 April 2018	Skarphedin (5)	0–9	(1) Odd	Bø
18:00 CEST (UTC+2)		Report	Broberg 8'; Lauritsen 30', 38' (pen.), 66', 76'; Rashani 73', 90+2'; Kitolano 78'; Mladenovic 83'	Stadium: Gullbringbanen; Attendance: 1,350; Referee: Herman Leiulfsrud Aass

18 April 2018	Pors Grenland (4)	1–2 (a.e.t.)	(2) Notodden	Porsgrunn
18:00 CEST (UTC+2)	Kongsro 78'	Report	Akinyemi 71', 120+1'	Stadium: Pors Stadion; Attendance: 562; Referee: Sander Magdalon Bråten

18 April 2018	Vigør (5)	1–8	(1) Start	Kristiansand
18:00 CEST (UTC+2)	Valjevcic 88'	Report	Bringaker 2'; Berger 29'; Salvesen 32', 73'; Sigurðarson 33', 40', 63'; Afeez 64'	Stadium: Hellemyr kunstgress Attendance: 812; Referee: Marius Lien

18 April 2018	Vindbjart (4)	1–2	(2) Jerv	Vennesla
18:00 CEST (UTC+2)	Jabai 11'	Report	Follerås 78'; Hagen 84'	Stadium: Moseidmoen; Attendance: 623; Referee: Jørgen Haga

18 April 2018	Eiger (5)	0–1	(3) Egersunds	Eigerøya
18:00 CEST (UTC+2)		Report	Nyborg 20'	Stadium: Bøgh Hafsø banen Attendance: 1,100; Referee: Ole-Petter Grindheim

18 April 2018	Staal Jørpeland (4)	0–1	(3) Bryne	Jørpeland
18:00 CEST (UTC+2)		Report	Lye 54'	Stadium: Jørpeland stadion Referee: Aleksander Skjold Vermundsen

18 April 2018	Sola (4)	2–3	(2) Sandnes Ulf	Solakrossen
18:00 CEST (UTC+2)	Meinseth 35'; Hinna 76'	Report	Aasen 60'; Kryger 72', 81'	Stadium: Sola stadion Attendance: 250; Referee: Ola Kellerhals

18 April 2018	Vidar (3)	5–1	(4) Vardeneset	Stavanger
18:00 CEST (UTC+2)	Hellestø 12'; Christensen 16'; Håland 47'; Hummervoll 64', 90'	Report	Jakobsen 3'	Stadium: Lassa Idrettspark; Attendance: 228; Referee: André Bjørgen Birkeland

18 April 2018	Madla (4)	0–2	(2) Viking	Stavanger
18:00 CEST (UTC+2)		Report	Høiland 3', 24'	Stadium: ISS Stadion; Attendance: 1,050; Referee: Daniel Higraff

18 April 2018	Skjold (5)	0–3	(1) Haugesund	Skjold
18:00 CEST (UTC+2)		Report	Kovačević 13'; Velde 36'; Skjerve 41'	Stadium: Grinde kunstgras Attendance: 700; Referee: Mischa Kellerhals

18 April 2018	Os (5)	1–6	(2) Åsane	Os
18:00 CEST (UTC+2)	Eide 81'	Report	Hammersland 8', 18', 41'; Lorentzen 23'; Solli 37'; Tørum 89'	Stadium: Kuventræ; Attendance: 647; Referee: Marius Hansen Grøtta

18 April 2018	Øystese (4)	1–4	(2) Sogndal	Øystese
18:00 CEST (UTC+2)	Aase 38'	Report	Flo 73', 87'; Soltvedt 75'; Haugen 90+2'	Stadium: Norheimsund stadion kunstgress Attendance: 500; Referee: Steinar Hauge

18 April 2018	Sotra (4)	1–1 (a.e.t.) (4–3 p)	(3) Vard Haugesund	Bergen
18:00 CEST (UTC+2)	Stava 38'	Report	Kvalvågnes 18'	Stadium: Varden Amfi; Referee: Anders Bjerk Hansen

18 April 2018	Arna-Bjørnar (5)	1–1 (a.e.t.) (0–3 p)	(4) Lysekloster	Bergen
18:00 CEST (UTC+2)	Hanstvedt 32'	Report	Østervold 76'	Stadium: Garnes kunstgress Referee: Ruben Haugland

18 April 2018	Fana (4)	0–1	(2) Nest-Sotra	Bergen
18:00 CEST (UTC+2)		Report	Edvardsen 41'	Stadium: Nesttun Idrettsplass; Attendance: 250; Referee: André Knudsen Arnholt

18 April 2018	Tertnes (4)	0–1	(4) Fyllingsdalen	Bergen
18:00 CEST (UTC+2)		Report	Bergset 83'	Stadium: Åstveit idrettspark 1 Referee: Vebjørn Nord Haugland

18 April 2018	Fjøra (5)	2–3 (a.e.t.)	(2) Florø	Sogndalsfjøra
18:00 CEST (UTC+2)	Knutsen 57'; Hoberg 83'	Report	Husa 68', 104'; Callaku 90+1' (pen.)	Stadium: Fosshaugane Campus; Attendance: 350; Referee: Svein Tore Sinnes

18 April 2018	Bergsøy (5)	2–1	(2) Aalesund	Bergsøy
18:00 CEST (UTC+2)	Tepurić 75'; Rogers 87'	Report	Meade 30'	Stadium: Havila Stadium; Attendance: 1,029; Referee: Even Myrheim

18 April 2018	Herd (4)	1–4	(3) Brattvåg	Ålesund
18:00 CEST (UTC+2)	Fosse 41'	Report	Zamble 4', 49'; Fellows 24'; Grytten 64'	Stadium: Amfi Moa Stadion; Attendance: 400; Referee: Bendik Haarberg

18 April 2018	Volda (5)	0–1	(3) Hødd	Volda
18:00 CEST (UTC+2)		Report	Saunes 59'	Stadium: Volda Stadion; Attendance: 200; Referee: Torgeir Halsen

18 April 2018	Træff (4)	1–6	(1) Molde	Molde
18:00 CEST (UTC+2)	Jonassen 46'	Report	Chukwu 7', 63', 90'; Wadji 12', 26'; Brustad 14'	Stadium: Reknesbanen; Attendance: 600; Referee: Mads Skarsem

18 April 2018	Sunndal (5)	0–4	(1) Kristiansund	Sunndalsøra
18:00 CEST (UTC+2)		Report	Stokke 36'; Coly 60'; Kalludra 72'; Sørmo 90+4'	Stadium: Sande stadion Attendance: 600; Referee: Marte Sørø

18 April 2018	Kvik (5)	0–1	(1) Ranheim	Trondheim
18:00 CEST (UTC+2)		Report	Helmersen 68'	Stadium: Rosenborgbanen; Attendance: 292; Referee: Henrikke Nervik

18 April 2018	Stjørdals-Blink (3)	6–0	(4) Kolstad	Stjørdalshalsen
18:00 CEST (UTC+2)	Sollihaug 2'; Nordskag 31'; Stokke 33', 70', 89'; Šišić 85'	Report		Stadium: Nye Blinkbanen; Attendance: 161; Referee: Oliver Skaret Barsøe

18 April 2018	Orkla (4)	2–1	(3) Nardo	Orkanger
18:00 CEST (UTC+2)	Helgetun 49'; Lynum 84'	Report	Engan 52'	Stadium: Orkdalsbanken Stadion; Attendance: 188; Referee: Erlend Helmersen

18 April 2018	Byåsen (4)	0–3	(2) Levanger	Trondheim
18:00 CEST (UTC+2)		Report	Voll 3', 65'; Duah 79'	Stadium: Byåsen Arena; Attendance: 118; Referee: Robert Eggen

18 April 2018	Steinkjer (4)	4–2	(5) Strindheim	Steinkjer
18:00 CEST (UTC+2)	Sørkilflå 45', 58'; Sivertsen 79', 90'	Report	Krokbø 16'; Engvik 83'	Stadium: Guldbergaunet Stadion; Attendance: 142; Referee: Dag Erik Tangvik

18 April 2018	Sortland (4)	1–2 (a.e.t.)	(3) Mjølner	Sortland
18:00 CEST (UTC+2)	Tarasovs 118'	Report	Arntsen 108'; Torvanger 120'	Stadium: Blåbyhallen; Attendance: 250; Referee: Simen Albrigtsen Eilertsen

18 April 2018	Fløya (4)	1–3 (a.e.t.)	(2) Tromsdalen	Tromsø
18:00 CEST (UTC+2)	Michalsen 63'	Report	Løvland 8'; Laugsand 97'; Jenssen 118'	Stadium: Fløyabanen; Attendance: 280; Referee: Kristian Kristiansen

18 April 2018	Senja (4)	2–1	(4) Finnsnes	Silsand
18:00 CEST (UTC+2)	Johnsgård 10'; Jensen 89' (pen.)	Report	Aloyseous 76'	Stadium: Islandbotn; Referee: Geir-Oskar Isaksen

18 April 2018	Skjervøy (4)	1–3	(1) Tromsø	Skjervøy
18:00 CEST (UTC+2)	Waage 78'	Report	Samb 11'; Kjærgaard 76'; Grønli 81'	Stadium: Skjervøy kunstgress Attendance: 501; Referee: Egil Bertheussen

18 April 2018	Arendal (3)	2–0	(3) Fløy	Arendal
18:00 CEST (UTC+2)	Christensen 26', 67'	Report		Stadium: Bjønnes Stadion; Attendance: 552; Referee: Per Thomas Byrkjedal

18 April 2018	Sandviken (5)	1–6	(1) Brann	Bergen
18:15 CEST (UTC+2)	Grøttå 59'	Report	Vega 7', 60'; Johansen 25', 44'; Braaten 32'; Heggebø 65'	Stadium: Stemmemyren Kunstgress; Attendance: 1,100; Referee: Sivert Amland

18 April 2018	Valdres (4)	2–1 (a.e.t.)	(4) Brumunddal	Fagernes
19:00 CEST (UTC+2)	Spence 15'; Ludvigsen 101' (o.g.)	Report	Andersen 68'	Stadium: Blåbærmyra; Referee: Jesper Østbøl Lea

18 April 2018	Junkeren (4)	1–0	(5) Mo	Bodø
19:00 CEST (UTC+2)	Berg 2'	Report		Stadium: Nordland Hall; Attendance: 120; Referee: Mathias Støfringshaug

18 April 2018	Tynset (4)	0–3	(2) HamKam	Tynset
19:00 CEST (UTC+2)		Report	Nordli 40'; Alegre 42'; Dønnum 79'	Stadium: Nytrømoen; Attendance: 250; Referee: Stian Wiggen Hansen

19 April 2018	Melbo (4)	1–4	(1) Bodø/Glimt	Melbu
16:45 CEST (UTC+2)	Pedersen 66'	Report	Olsen 23'; Hauge 44' (pen.), 81'; Zinckernagel 52'	Stadium: Melbu Stadium; Attendance: 500; Referee: Martin Berg

19 April 2018	Lokomotiv Oslo (4)	0–3	(3) KFUM Oslo	Oslo
18:00 CEST (UTC+2)		Report	Vedvik 59'; Mawa 83'; Kastrati 86'	Stadium: Marienlyst kunstgress Attendance: 77; Referee: Abdulhadi Al-Fahad

19 April 2018	Trygg/Lade (5)	2–4	(1) Rosenborg	Trondheim
18:00 CEST (UTC+2)	Midtsand 22'; Berre 45'	Report	Zekhnini 28'; Lundemo 47'; Søderlund 52'; Bjørnstad 90'	Stadium: Lade Anlegget; Attendance: 1,500; Referee: Thomas Solum Lystad

== Second round ==
Number of teams per tier entering this round
Eliteserien (1)	1. divisjon (2)	2. divisjon (3)	3. divisjon (4)	4. divisjon (5)	Total
16 / 16	15 / 16	21 / 28	11 / 84	1 / 298	64 / 442

1 May 2018	Grorud (3)	0–1	(1) Vålerenga	Oslo
18:00 CEST (UTC+2)		Report	Carvalho 24'	Stadium: Grorud Matchbane; Attendance: 1,455; Referee: Mohammad Usman Aslam

1 May 2018	Kongsvinger (2)	4–2	(3) Raufoss	Kongsvinger
18:00 CEST (UTC+2)	Güven 2'; Ibrahim 55'; Castro 78', 90+3'	Report	Nilsen 4'; Henningsson 10'	Stadium: Gjemselund Stadion; Attendance: 713; Referee: Per Erik Haugen

1 May 2018	Orkla (4)	1–3	(1) Ranheim	Orkanger
18:00 CEST (UTC+2)	Helgetun 74'	Report	Karlsen 10'; Kvande 44'; Solli 86'	Stadium: Orkdalsbanken Stadion; Attendance: 872; Referee: Mads Skarsem

2 May 2018	Mjølner (3)	2–1	(3) Stjørdals-Blink	Narvik
16:00 CEST (UTC+2)	Johnsen 10'; Kalinins 90+4'	Report	Kartum 76'	Stadium: Narvik Stadion; Attendance: 219

2 May 2018	Junkeren (4)	0–3	(2) Levanger	Bodø
17:30 CEST (UTC+2)		Report	Hajdari 6'; Aas 58'; Konradsen 86'	Stadium: Nordland Hall; Attendance: 316; Referee: Martin Berg

2 May 2018	Fredrikstad (3)	1–3	(1) Odd	Fredrikstad
18:00 CEST (UTC+2)	Chaib 70'	Report	Lauritsen 10', 26'; Njie 49'	Stadium: Fredrikstad Stadion; Attendance: 1,981; Referee: Bjørn Hansen

2 May 2018	Skeid (3)	3–0	(1) Sandefjord	Oslo
18:00 CEST (UTC+2)	Aleesami 23'; Hassan 69'; Can 74' (pen.)	Report		Stadium: Nordre Åsen; Attendance: 483; Referee: Christian Moen

2 May 2018	Kjelsås (3)	0–3	(2) Ullensaker/Kisa	Oslo
18:00 CEST (UTC+2)		Report	Aalbu 25'; Solberg 66'; Nesset 90+1'	Stadium: Grefsen Stadion; Attendance: 244; Referee: Ola Kellerhals

2 May 2018	Strømmen (2)	1–2	(3) Bærum	Strømmen
18:00 CEST (UTC+2)	Olsen 83'	Report	Aubert 62'; Llullaku 75'	Stadium: Strømmen Stadion; Attendance: 199; Referee: Mischa Kellerhals

2 May 2018	HamKam (2)	4–0 (a.e.t.)	(3) Hønefoss	Hamar
18:00 CEST (UTC+2)	O.Midtskogen 92', 117'; Ómarsson 95'; Buduson 116'	Report		Stadium: Briskeby Arena; Attendance: 409; Referee: Ole-Alexander Ekeli Valen

2 May 2018	Elverum (3)	2–3 (a.e.t.)	(3) KFUM Oslo	Elverum
18:00 CEST (UTC+2)	Rasch 3'; Bellhcen 97'	Report	Sortevik 10'; Mawa 119' (pen.); Aalmen 120'	Stadium: Elverum Stadion; Attendance: 157; Referee: Sulman Hussain

2 May 2018	Valdres (4)	1–3	(1) Strømsgodset	Fagernes
18:00 CEST (UTC+2)	Høglien 71'	Report	Tokstad 31'; Pellegrino 76'; Jradi 83'	Stadium: Blåbærmyra; Attendance: 823; Referee: Harald Røvig Sletner

2 May 2018	Ørn-Horten (4)	0–6	(1) Sarpsborg 08	Horten
18:00 CEST (UTC+2)		Report	Schwartz 16', 25' (pen.), 67'; Tveter 34'; Utvik 36'; Heintz 73'	Stadium: Lystlunden; Attendance: 582; Referee: Sander Magdalon Bråten

2 May 2018	Fram Larvik (3)	2–3 (a.e.t.)	(2) Mjøndalen	Larvik
18:00 CEST (UTC+2)	Rugland 20'; Bredeli 94'	Report	Bojang 13'; Hellum 109'; Jansen 119'	Stadium: Fram Stadion; Attendance: 306; Referee: Jørgen Haugen

2 May 2018	Notodden (2)	3–0	(3) Asker	Notodden
18:00 CEST (UTC+2)	Ferreira 50'; Hustad 72'; Hoven 90+1'	Report		Stadium: Notodden Stadion; Attendance: 351; Referee: Jon Romuld Håversen

2 May 2018	Arendal (3)	0–3	(1) Start	Arendal
18:00 CEST (UTC+2)		Report	Lowe 55'; Käck 58'; Kabran 79'	Stadium: Bjønnes Stadion; Attendance: 1,276; Referee: Daniel Higraff

2 May 2018	Egersund (3)	2–1	(2) Jerv	Egersund
18:00 CEST (UTC+2)	Sleveland 34'; Grande 90+1'	Report	Ferreira 19'	Stadium: Idrettsparken; Attendance: 370; Referee: Marius Lien

2 May 2018	Sandnes Ulf (2)	1–0	(3) Vidar	Sandnes
18:00 CEST (UTC+2)	Kachi 36'	Report		Stadium: Sandnes Stadion; Attendance: 265; Referee: Vebjørn Haugland

2 May 2018	Sotra (4)	0–4	(1) Brann	Sotra
18:00 CEST (UTC+2)		Report	Grønner 20'; Vega 25'; Larsen 41'; Marengo 75'	Stadium: Straume Sports Park; Attendance: 1,113; Referee: Marius Hansen Grøtta

2 May 2018	Lysekloster (4)	1–2	(1) Haugesund	Os
18:00 CEST (UTC+2)	Dyngeland 61'	Report	Koné 38'; Velde 56'	Stadium: Monastery Framo Idrettspark; Attendance: 501; Referee: Svein Tore Sinnes

2 May 2018	Nest-Sotra (2)	3–3 (a.e.t.) (6–5 p)	(2) Åsane	Bergen
18:00 CEST (UTC+2)	Furdal 15'; Rødsand 57'; Dang 112'	Report	Fantoft 47'; Larsen 78'; Huseklepp 92'	Stadium: Varden Amfi; Attendance: 172; Referee: Sivert Amland
	Penalties
	Furdal (penalty scored); Rødsand (penalty missed); Sæthre (penalty scored); Haugsdal (penalty scored); Bjørlo (penalty scored); Martinsen (penalty scored); Dang (penalty scored); Čírak (penalty scored)		(penalty scored) Hestetun; (penalty scored) Kristoffersen; (penalty scored) Solli; (penalty missed) Bruun-Hanssen; (penalty missed) Huseklepp; (penalty scored) Hammersland; (penalty scored) Ogungbaro; (penalty missed) Harris

2 May 2018	Fyllingsdalen (4)	2–1 (a.e.t.)	(2) Sogndal	Bergen
18:00 CEST (UTC+2)	Nyland 44'; Kampenes 110'	Report	Birkelund 65'	Stadium: Varden Amfi; Attendance: 400; Referee: André Knudsen Arnholt

2 May 2018	Hødd (3)	1–0 (a.e.t.)	(2) Florø	Ulsteinvik
18:00 CEST (UTC+2)	Rise 120'	Report		Stadium: Høddvoll Stadion; Referee: Thomas Solum Lystad

2 May 2018	Bergsøy (5)	0–6	(1) Kristiansund	Bergsøy
18:00 CEST (UTC+2)		Report	Stokke 26', 30', 52'; Bye 40'; Kalludra 69'; Sørli 82'	Stadium: Havila Stadium; Referee: Mathias Smehus Kringstad

2 May 2018	Brattvåg (3)	1–0 (a.e.t.)	(1) Molde	Brattvåg
18:00 CEST (UTC+2)	Stensøe 106'	Report		Stadium: Brattvåg gras Attendance: 1,010; Referee: Jan Morten Tennøy

2 May 2018	Steinkjer (4)	0–5	(1) Rosenborg	Steinkjer
18:00 CEST (UTC+2)		Report	Trondsen 28'; Botheim 30', 45', 90'; Stamnestrø 85'	Stadium: Guldbergaunet Stadion; Attendance: 4,032; Referee: Robert Eggen

2 May 2018	Harstad (4)	2–5	(1) Bodø/Glimt	Harstad
18:00 CEST (UTC+2)	Andersen 4', 61'	Report	Drage 3'; Herrem 51'; Berg 68'; Bjørnbak 84'; Opseth 90+4'	Stadium: Harstad stadion Attendance: 1,273; Referee: Ali Al-Hatem

2 May 2018	Alta (3)	3–1 (a.e.t.)	(2) Tromsdalen	Alta
18:00 CEST (UTC+2)	Jacobsen 74'; Cordero 113', 120+2'	Report	Mienna 65'	Stadium: Alta Idrettspark; Attendance: 320; Referee: Stian Røvig Sletner

2 May 2018	Senja (4)	0–1 (a.e.t.)	(1) Tromsø	Silsand
18:15 CEST (UTC+2)		Report	Landu-Landu 119'	Stadium: Islandbotn; Attendance: 500; Referee: Magnus Koløy

2 May 2018	Bryne (3)	1–0	(2) Viking	Bryne
19:00 CEST (UTC+2)	el Ghaouti 88'	Report		Stadium: Bryne Stadion; Attendance: 2,396; Referee: Steinar Hauge

3 May 2018	Moss (3)	0–1 (a.e.t.)	(1) Stabæk	Moss
18:00 CEST (UTC+2)		Report	Boli 112'	Stadium: Melløs Stadion; Attendance: 415; Referee: Eivind Bodding

3 May 2018	Lørenskog (4)	1–5	(1) Lillestrøm	Lørenskog
18:00 CEST (UTC+2)	Alba 8'	Report	Paulsen 19' (o.g.); Sandberg 50'; Melgalvis 73'; Krogstad 76'; Brenden 87'	Stadium: Rolvsrud stadion Attendance: 1,184; Referee: Ajdin Medic

== Third round ==
Number of teams per tier entering this round
Eliteserien (1)	1. divisjon (2)	2. divisjon (3)	3. divisjon (4)	4. divisjon (5)	Total
14 / 16	8 / 16	9 / 28	1 / 84	0 / 298	32 / 442

9 May 2018	Bærum (3)	0–3	(1) Strømsgodset	Sandvika
18:00 CEST (UTC+2)		Report	Lyngen 51' (o.g.); Abdellaoue 59'; Andersen 63'	Stadium: Kadettangen; Attendance: 500; Referee: Steinar Hauge

9 May 2018	Ullensaker/Kisa (2)	3–2 (a.e.t.)	(2) Kongsvinger	Jessheim
18:00 CEST (UTC+2)	Jørstad 7'; Solberg 32'; Kitolano 109'	Report	Bydal 13'; Kurtovic 44' (o.g.)	Stadium: Jessheim Stadion; Attendance: 675; Referee: Trygve Kjensli

9 May 2018	Notodden (2)	1–1 (a.e.t.) (1–3 p)	(1) Odd	Notodden
18:00 CEST (UTC+2)	Ferreira 2'	Report	Mladenovic 41'	Stadium: Notodden Stadion; Attendance: 1,158; Referee: Mohammad Usman Aslam
	Penalties
	Midtgarden (penalty missed); Asp (penalty scored); Hoven (penalty missed); Akinb.Akinyemi (penalty missed)		(penalty scored) Børven; (penalty scored) Ruud; (penalty scored) Nordkvelle

9 May 2018	KFUM Oslo (3)	1–3	(1) Lillestrøm	Oslo
18:00 CEST (UTC+2)	Gaye 54'	Report	Martin 19'; Olsen 25'; Mathew 90+4'	Stadium: KFUM Arena; Attendance: 1,169; Referee: Svein Tore Sinnes

9 May 2018	Nest-Sotra (2)	1–2	(1) Haugesund	Bergen
18:00 CEST (UTC+2)	Liseth 19'	Report	Gytkjær 55', 90+2'	Stadium: Varden Amfi; Attendance: 603; Referee: Tom Harald Hagen

9 May 2018	Egersund (3)	0–1	(1) Start	Egersund
18:00 CEST (UTC+2)		Report	Bringaker 76'	Stadium: Idrettsparken; Attendance: 876; Referee: Jan Morten Tennøy

9 May 2018	Mjøndalen (2)	2–0	(1) Stabæk	Mjøndalen
18:00 CEST (UTC+2)	Hellum 49'; Bojang 51'	Report		Stadium: Isachsen Stadion; Attendance: 884; Referee: Christian Moen

9 May 2018	Mjølner (3)	1–2	(1) Bodø/Glimt	Narvik
18:00 CEST (UTC+2)	Torvanger 82'; Evjen (penalty missed) 90+3'	Report	Saltnes 61'; Herrem 69'	Stadium: Narvik Stadion; Attendance: 951; Referee: Daniel Higraff

9 May 2018	Brattvåg (3)	0–1	(1) Rosenborg	Brattvåg
18:00 CEST (UTC+2)		Report	Søderlund 64'	Stadium: Brattvåg gras Attendance: 2,083; Referee: Kristoffer Hagenes

9 May 2018	Levanger (2)	2–4	(1) Ranheim	Levanger
18:00 CEST (UTC+2)	López 18'; Stene 60'	Report	Karlsen 56', 67' (pen.); Reginiussen 74'; Sørløkk 76'	Stadium: Moan Fritidspark; Attendance: 848; Referee: Mads Skarsem

9 May 2018	Alta (3)	0–1 (a.e.t.)	(1) Tromsø	Alta
18:00 CEST (UTC+2)		Report	Bakenga 107'	Stadium: Alta Idrettspark; Attendance: 1,001; Referee: Bjørn Hansen

9 May 2018	Fyllingsdalen (4)	0–1	(1) Brann	Bergen
18:00 CEST (UTC+2)		Report	Vega 49'	Stadium: Varden Amfi; Attendance: 3,500; Referee: Kai Erik Steen

9 May 2018	Bryne (3)	1–0	(2) Sandnes Ulf	Bryne
18:30 CEST (UTC+2)	Bøgild 84'	Report		Stadium: Bryne Stadion; Attendance: 1,047; Referee: Marius Hansen Grøtta

9 May 2018	Skeid (3)	1–2	(1) Vålerenga	Oslo
19:15 CEST (UTC+2)	Godoy 65'	Report	Finne 38'; Carvalho 51'	Stadium: Nordre Åsen; Attendance: 2,623; Referee: Espen Eskås

10 May 2018	Hødd (3)	2–0	(1) Kristiansund	Ulsteinvik
18:00 CEST (UTC+2)	Moltu 24'; Osvold 43'	Report		Stadium: Høddvoll Stadion; Attendance: 1,159; Referee: Tommy Skjerven

10 May 2018	HamKam (2)	1–0	(1) Sarpsborg 08	Hamar
18:00 CEST (UTC+2)	Buduson 76'	Report		Stadium: Briskeby Arena; Attendance: 2,171; Referee: Trond Ivar Døvle

== Fourth round ==
Number of teams per tier entering this round
Eliteserien (1)	1. divisjon (2)	2. divisjon (3)	3. divisjon (4)	4. divisjon (5)	Total
11 / 16	3 / 16	2 / 28	0 / 84	0 / 298	16 / 442

30 May 2018	Rosenborg (1)	2–2 (a.e.t.) (7–6 p)	(1) Odd	Trondheim
18:30 CEST (UTC+2)	Konradsen 25'; Søderlund 81'	Report	Risa 3'; Lauritsen 79'	Stadium: Lerkendal Stadion; Attendance: 6,059; Referee: Kai Erik Steen
	Penalties
	Levi (penalty scored); Søderlund (penalty scored); Hedenstad (penalty scored); Hovland (penalty scored); Meling (penalty scored); Rasmussen (penalty scored); Reginiussen (penalty scored)		(penalty scored) Lauritsen; (penalty scored) Ruud; (penalty scored) Nordkvelle; (penalty scored) Risa; (penalty scored) Bergan; (penalty scored) Njie; (penalty missed) Hoff

30 May 2018	Lillestrøm (1)	4–1	(1) Brann	Lillestrøm
20:00 CEST (UTC+2)	Mathew 51'; Martin 68'; Olsen 75'; Haakenstad 90'	Report	Karadas 52'	Stadium: Åråsen Stadion; Attendance: 4,456; Referee: Tom Harald Hagen

13 June 2018	Ullensaker/Kisa (2)	0–0 (a.e.t.) (3–4 p)	(3) Bryne	Jessheim
18:30 CEST (UTC+2)		Report		Stadium: Jessheim Stadion; Attendance: 595; Referee: Tommy Skjerven
	Penalties
	Solberg (penalty missed); Torp (penalty missed); Nesset (penalty scored); Hansen (penalty scored); Kurtovic (penalty scored)		(penalty scored) Lye; (penalty scored) Bøgild; (penalty missed) Langeland; (penalty scored) Fjelde; (penalty scored) Ystanes

13 June 2018	Start (1)	1–1 (a.e.t.) (5–3 p)	(2) HamKam	Kristiansand
18:30 CEST (UTC+2)	Børufsen 34'	Report	Ibrahim 49'	Stadium: Sør Arena; Attendance: 1,704; Referee: Kristoffer Hagenes
	Penalties
	Sigurðarson (penalty scored); Sandberg (penalty scored); Finnbogason (penalty scored); Christensen (penalty scored); Kabran (penalty scored)		(penalty missed) Brotangen; (penalty scored) Hagen; (penalty scored) Nordli; (penalty scored) Moen

13 June 2018	Mjøndalen (2)	2–2 (a.e.t.) (6–7 p)	(1) Haugesund	Mjøndalen
18:30 CEST (UTC+2)	Jansen 73', 90'	Report	Grindheim 19'; Gytkjær 46'	Stadium: Isachsen Stadion; Attendance: 1,071; Referee: Trygve Kjensli
	Penalties
	Gauseth (penalty scored); Hedlund (penalty missed); Lindseth (penalty scored); Sell (penalty scored); Eid (penalty scored); Bojang (penalty scored); Johansen (penalty scored); A.Hansen (penalty missed)		(penalty missed) Stølås; (penalty scored) Haraldseid; (penalty scored) Velde; (penalty scored) Kallevåg; (penalty missed) Skjerve; (penalty scored) Koné; (penalty scored) Tronstad; (penalty scored) David

13 June 2018	Bodø/Glimt (1)	2–2 (a.e.t.) (5–4 p)	(3) Hødd	Bodø
18:30 CEST (UTC+2)	Berg 45'; Bjørnbak 116' (pen.)	Report	Myklebust 9'; Naglestad 95'	Stadium: Aspmyra Stadion; Attendance: 851; Referee: Dag Vidar Hafsås
	Penalties
	Moberg (penalty scored); Bjørnbak (penalty scored); Ángel (penalty scored); Saltnes (penalty scored); Opseth (penalty scored)		(penalty scored) Naglestad; (penalty scored) Haugan; (penalty missed) Saunes; (penalty scored) Hjelmeseth; (penalty scored) Wrele

14 June 2018	Tromsø (1)	3–3 (a.e.t.) (4–5 p)	(1) Vålerenga	Tromsø
18:00 CEST (UTC+2)	Berntsen 31'; Espejord 69', 100'	Report	Finne 3', 94'; Johnson 82'	Stadium: Alfheim Stadion; Attendance: 2,166; Referee: Rohit Saggi
	Penalties
	Espejord (penalty scored); Gundersen (penalty missed); Bakenga (penalty scored); Samb (penalty scored); Taylor (penalty scored)		(penalty scored) Tollås; (penalty scored) Juklerød; (penalty missed) Johnson; (penalty scored) Adekugbe; (penalty scored) Ejuke

14 June 2018	Strømsgodset (1)	2–0	(1) Ranheim	Drammen
18:00 CEST (UTC+2)	Andersen 57'; Jradi 90+2'	Report		Stadium: Marienlyst Stadion; Attendance: 2,863; Referee: Trond Ivar Døvle

== Quarter-finals ==
Number of teams per tier entering this round
Eliteserien (1)	1. divisjon (2)	2. divisjon (3)	3. divisjon (4)	4. divisjon (5)	Total
7 / 16	0 / 16	1 / 28	0 / 84	0 / 298	8 / 442

26 September 2018	Start (1)	2–1	(1) Bodø/Glimt	Kristiansand
18:00 CEST (UTC+2)	Christensen 7'; Shala 76'	Report	Opseth 19'	Stadium: Sør Arena; Attendance: 5,026; Referee: Espen Eskås

26 September 2018	Rosenborg (1)	2–0	(1) Vålerenga	Trondheim
20:00 CEST (UTC+2)	Denić 17'; Søderlund 54'	Report		Stadium: Lerkendal Stadion; Attendance: 6,579; Referee: Kai Erik Steen

27 September 2018	Lillestrøm (1)	2–0	(3) Bryne	Lillestrøm
18:00 CEST (UTC+2)	Lehne Olsen 66'; Martin 69' (pen.)	Report		Stadium: Åråsen Stadion; Attendance: 3,777; Referee: Trygve Kjensli

27 September 2018	Haugesund (1)	0–1	(1) Strømsgodset	Haugesund
20:00 CEST (UTC+2)		Report	Abdellaoue 16'	Stadium: Haugesund Stadion; Attendance: 2,921; Referee: Trond Ivar Døvle

== Semi-finals ==
Number of teams per tier entering this round
Eliteserien (1)	1. divisjon (2)	2. divisjon (3)	3. divisjon (4)	4. divisjon (5)	Total
4 / 16	0 / 16	0 / 28	0 / 84	0 / 298	4 / 442

31 October 2018	Strømsgodset (1)	3–0	(1) Lillestrøm	Drammen
20:00 CET (UTC+1)	Abdellaoue 49', 52', 83'	Report		Stadium: Marienlyst Stadion; Attendance: 5,765; Referee: Tom Harald Hagen

1 November 2018	Rosenborg (1)	2–1	(1) Start	Trondheim
19:05 CET (UTC+1)	Bendtner 55'; Søderlund 90+3'	Report	Sandberg 33'	Stadium: Lerkendal Stadion; Attendance: 7,908; Referee: Ola Hobber Nilsen

== Final ==
2 December 2018
13:15 CET (UTC+1)

Rosenborg	4–1	Strømsgodset
Jensen 18'; Konradsen 40'; Bendtner 52', 90+4'	Report	Abdellaoue 13'

Ullevaal Stadion, Oslo
Attendance: 22,182
Referee: Trond Ivar Døvle (Fjellhamar)

== Scorers ==
8 goals:

- (Norway) Mustafa Abdellaoue - Strømsgodset

7 goals:

- (Norway) Tobias Lauritsen - Odd

4 goals:

- (Costa Rica) Deyver Vega - Brann
- (Norway) Gabriel Andersen - Harstad
- (Norway) Benjamin Stokke - Kristiansund
- (Norway) Thomas Lehne Olsen - Lillestrøm
- (Norway) Alexander Søderlund - Rosenborg
- (Norway) Bård Finne - Vålerenga

3 goals:

- (Norway) Joakim Hammersland - Åsane
- (Norway) Jone Rugland - Fram Larvik
- (Denmark) Frederik Gytkjær - Haugesund
- (Norway) Adem Güven - Kongsvinger
- (England) Gary Martin - Lillestrøm
- (Nigeria) Ifeanyi Mathew - Lillestrøm
- (Netherlands) Quint Jansen - Mjøndalen
- (Nigeria) Daniel Chima Chukwu - Molde
- (Norway) Eirik Søfting Høgseth - Mosjøen
- (Norway) Michael Karlsen - Ranheim
- (Denmark) Nicklas Bendtner - Rosenborg
- (Norway) Erik Botheim - Rosenborg
- (Norway) Tobias Heintz - Sarpsborg 08
- (Denmark) Ronnie Schwartz - Sarpsborg 08
- (Norway) Alexander Ruud Tveter - Sarpsborg 08
- (Ivory Coast) Franck Boli - Stabæk
- (Iceland) Aron Sigurðarson - Start
- (Norway) Sondre Stokke - Stjørdals-Blink
- (Norway) Eirik Ulland Andersen - Strømsgodset

2 goals:

- (Spain) Juan Manuel Cordero - Alta
- (Denmark) Rasmus Christensen - Arendal
- (The Gambia) Alagie Sanyang - Asker
- (Norway) Behajdin Celina - Asker
- (Sweden) Erblin Llullaku - Bærum
- (Norway) Patrick Berg - Bodø/Glimt
- (Norway) Martin Bjørnbak - Bodø/Glimt
- (Norway) Jens Petter Hauge - Bodø/Glimt
- (Norway) Geir André Herrem - Bodø/Glimt
- (Norway) Kristian Fardal Opseth - Bodø/Glimt
- (Norway) Henrik Kjelsrud Johansen - Brann
- (Norway) Willy Zamble - Brattvåg
- (Norway) Christer Husa - Florø
- (Norway) Youssef Chaib - Fredrikstad
- (Norway) Johnny Per Buduson - HamKam
- (Norway) Ole Erik Midtskogen - HamKam
- (Norway) Viktor Martin Framvik - Harstad
- (Norway) Kristoffer Velde - Haugesund
- (Norway) Moses Mawa - KFUM Oslo
- (Nigeria) Shuaibu Ibrahim - Kongsvinger
- (Norway) Niklas Castro - Kongsvinger
- (Sweden) Liridon Kalludra - Kristiansund
- (Norway) Vegard Voll - Levanger
- (Norway) Erik Næsbak Brenden - Lillestrøm
- (Norway) Aleksander Torvanger - Mjølner
- (Norway) Jibril Bojang - Mjøndalen
- (Norway) Andreas Hellum - Mjøndalen
- (Norway) Mikkel Aleksander Aarstrand - Moss
- (Norway) Tim Andre Reinback - Moss
- (Senegal) Ibrahima Wadji - Molde
- (Norway) Akinbola Akinyemi - Notodden
- (Portugal) Filipe Ferreira - Notodden
- (Kosovo) Elbasan Rashani - Odd
- (Norway) Stefan Mladenovic - Odd
- (Norway) Erik Helgetun - Orkla
- (Norway) Jens Erik Johansen - Ørn-Horten
- (Norway) Solomon Owusu - Raufoss
- (Norway) Matias Belli Moldskred - Raufoss
- (Sweden) Anton Henningsson - Raufoss
- (Norway) Anders Konradsen - Rosenborg
- (Kosovo) Flamur Kastrati - Sandefjord
- (Norway) Axel Kryger - Sandnes Ulf
- (Turkey) Mesüt Can - Skeid
- (Norway) Ulrik Flo - Sogndal
- (Norway) Mathias Bringaker - Start
- (Norway) Lars-Jørgen Salvesen - Start
- (Norway) Mathias Sørkilflå - Steinkjer
- (Norway) Thomas Sivertsen - Steinkjer
- (Lebanon) Bassel Jradi - Strømsgodset
- (Norway) Amahl Pellegrino - Strømsgodset
- (Norway) Runar Espejord - Tromsø
- (Norway) Ole Andreas Nesset - Ullensaker/Kisa
- (Norway) Nicolay Solberg - Ullensaker/Kisa
- (Norway) Emmanuel Bergstrøm - Ullern
- (Kosovo) Fitim Azemi - Vålerenga
- (Norway) Simen Juklerød - Vålerenga
- (Uruguay) Felipe Carvalho - Vålerenga
- (Norway) Martin Hummervoll - Vidar
- (Norway) Tommy Høiland - Viking

1 goal:

- (England) Jernade Meade - Aalesunds
- (Norway) Mats Frede Hansen - Alta
- (Norway) William Arne Hanssen - Alta
- (Norway) Felix Adrian Jacobsen - Alta
- (Norway) Håvard Mannsverk - Alta
- (Norway) Martin Hole Hanstvedt - Arna-Bjørnar
- (Norway) Andreas Fantoft - Åsane
- (Norway) Erik Huseklepp - Åsane
- (Norway) Erlend Hellevik Larsen - Åsane
- (Norway) Håkon Lorentzen - Åsane
- (Norway) Aleksander Solli - Åsane
- (Norway) Daniel Steensæth Tørum - Åsane
- (Norway) Cornelius Bencsik - Asker
- (Norway) Jan Aubert - Bærum
- (Norway) Jon Tveit Rønning - Bærum
- (Croatia) Franjo Tepurić - Bergsøy
- (England) Craig Stuart Rogers - Bergsøy
- (Denmark) Philip Zinckernagel - Bodø/Glimt
- (Norway) Thomas Drage - Bodø/Glimt
- (Norway) Trond Olsen - Bodø/Glimt
- (Norway) Ulrik Saltnes - Bodø/Glimt
- (Netherlands) Ludcinio Marengo- Brann
- (Norway) Daniel Braaten - Brann
- (Norway) Aune Selland Heggebø- Brann
- (Norway) Jonas Grønner- Brann
- (Norway) Azar Karadas- Brann
- (Norway) Peter Orry Larsen- Brann
- (Norway) Scott Drabløs Fellows - Brattvåg
- (Norway) Torbjørn Grytten - Brattvåg
- (Norway) Daniel Stensøe - Brattvåg
- (Norway) Fredrik Haave Andersen - Brumunddal
- (Morocco) Omar Fonstad el Ghaouti - Bryne
- (Norway) Mads Bøgild - Bryne
- (Norway) Einar Tunheim Lye - Bryne
- (Norway) Markus Aaser Grønli - Drøbak-Frogn
- (Norway) Chris Sleveland - Egersunds
- (Norway) Kenneth Grande Nyborg - Egersunds
- (Norway) Kim Robert Nyborg - Egersunds
- (Norway) Jonatan André Teigland - Eidsvold
- (Norway) Johan Finnmann Gulliksen - Eik-Tønsberg
- (Norway) Eivind Holte Tøråsen - Elverum
- (Norway) Robin Rasch - Elverum
- (Morocco) Elmahdi Bellhcen - Elverum
- (Norway) Thomas Aloyseous - Finnsnes
- (Norway) Joar Hoberg - Fjøra
- (Norway) Morten Knutsen - Fjøra
- (Norway) Sondre Krogstad Høyem - Flint
- (Poland) Adrian Krysian - Flint
- (Denmark) Lorent Callaku - Florø
- (Norway) Fredrik Michalsen - Fløya
- (Ivory Coast) Kevin Beugré - Fram Larvik
- (Norway) Henrik Bredeli - Fram Larvik
- (Norway) Mahmoud Laham - Fram Larvik
- (Denmark) Mads Nielsen - Fredrikstad
- (Norway) Tim André Nilsen - Fredrikstad
- (Norway) Ludvig Begby - Fredrikstad
- (Norway) Kaspar Bergset - Fyllingsdalen
- (Norway) Eirik Kampenes - Fyllingsdalen
- (Norway) Henrik Nyland - Fyllingsdalen
- (Norway) Zirak Ahmed - Grorud
- (Norway) Fredrick Pettersen - Grorud
- (Iceland) Orri Sigurður Ómarsson - HamKam
- (Norway) Aron Dønnum - HamKam
- (Nigeria) Abubakar Aliyu Ibrahim - HamKam
- (Norway) Simen Bolkan Nordli - HamKam
- (Spain) Rubén Alegre - HamKam
- (Serbia) Nikica Košutić - Harstad
- (Mali) Ibrahima Koné - Haugesund
- (Norway) Christian Grindheim- Haugesund
- (Norway) Vegard Skjerve- Haugesund
- (Serbia) Aleksandar Kovačević - Haugesund
- (Norway) Emil Fosse - Herd
- (Norway) Steffen Moltu - Hødd
- (Norway) Magnus Myklebust - Hødd
- (Norway) Markus Naglestad - Hødd
- (Norway) Joachim Osvold - Hødd
- (Norway) Bendik Rise - Hødd
- (Norway) Eirik Saunes - Hødd
- (Norway) Daniel Østebø - Hønefoss
- (Norway) Markus Thorberg - Hønefoss
- (Brazil) Luke Ferreira - Jerv
- (Norway) Christian Follerås - Jerv
- (Norway) Andreas Hagen - Jerv
- (Norway) Lasse Johan Berg - Junkeren
- (Norway) Håkon Aalmen - KFUM Oslo
- (Norway) Dadi Dodou Gaye - KFUM Oslo
- (Norway) Fisnik Kastrati - KFUM Oslo
- (Norway) Stian Sortevik - KFUM Oslo
- (Norway) Simen Vedvik - KFUM Oslo
- (Norway) Lowrens Piero Rosinelli Becerra - Kjelsås
- (Norway) Jesper Solli - Kjelsås
- (Norway) Jesper Taaje - Kjelsås
- (Norway) Even Bydal - Kongsvinger
- (Norway) Martin Lundal - Kongsvinger
- (Norway) Bendik Bye - Kristiansund
- (Norway) Sondre Sørli - Kristiansund
- (Norway) Bent Sørmo - Kristiansund
- (Senegal) Aliou Coly - Kristiansund
- (Finland) Solomon Duah - Levanger
- (Norway) Jo Sondre Aas - Levanger
- (Norway) Heike Lie Konradsen - Levanger
- (Norway) Robert Stene - Levanger
- (Spain) Adrià Mateo López - Levanger
- (Sweden) Ermal Hajdari - Levanger
- (Norway) Mats Haakenstad - Lillestrøm
- (Norway) Fredrik Krogstad - Lillestrøm
- (Norway) Aleksander Melgalvis - Lillestrøm
- (Norway) Erik Sandberg - Lillestrøm
- (Norway) Andreas Storsveen Romøren - Lørenskog
- (Norway) Chimaobi Ifejilika - Lyn
- (Norway) Stian Dyngeland - Lysekloster
- (Norway) Kristoffer Østervold - Lysekloster
- (Norway) Adrian Pedersen - Melbo
- (Latvia) Nikita Kalinins - Mjølner
- (Norway) Fredrik Arntsen - Mjølner
- (Norway) Mathias Johnsen - Mjølner
- (Norway) Sebastian Temte Hansen - Mjøndalen
- (Norway) Ylldren Ibrahimaj - Mjøndalen
- (Norway) Jonathan Lindseth - Mjøndalen
- (Norway) Alfred Scriven - Mjøndalen
- (Norway) Fredrik Brustad - Molde
- (Norway) Christoffer Engan - Nardo
- (Norway) Alexander Dang - Nest-Sotra
- (Norway) Joachim Edvardsen - Nest-Sotra
- (Norway) Johnny Furdal - Nest-Sotra
- (Norway) Sondre Liseth - Nest-Sotra
- (Norway) Andreas Rødsand - Nest-Sotra
- (Norway) Andreas Hoven - Notodden
- (Norway) Erlend Hustad - Notodden
- (Sweden) Martin Broberg - Odd
- (Norway) Joshua Kitolano - Odd
- (Norway) Bilal Njie - Odd
- (Norway) Birk Risa - Odd
- (Norway) Jan Inge Lynum - Orkla
- (Norway) Artan Brovina - Ørn-Horten
- (Norway) Øystein Takle Eide - Os
- (Norway) Markus Cham - Østsiden
- (Norway) Christoffer Alagie Jatta Skårn - Østsiden
- (Norway) Jens Aase - Øystese
- (Norway) Vegard Kongsro - Pors Grenland
- (Norway) Andreas Helmersen - Ranheim
- (Norway) Daniel Kvande - Ranheim
- (Norway) Mads Reginiussen - Ranheim
- (Norway) Sivert Solli - Ranheim
- (Norway) Sondre Sørløkk - Ranheim
- (Norway) Ryan Doghman- Raufoss
- (Norway) Snorre Strand Nilsen- Raufoss
- (Norway) Mikal Haugen Bjørnstad - Rosenborg
- (Serbia) Đorđe Denić - Rosenborg
- (Denmark) Mike Jensen - Rosenborg
- (Norway) Marius Lundemo - Rosenborg
- (Norway) Magnus Stamnestrø - Rosenborg
- (Norway) Alexander Søderlund - Rosenborg
- (Norway) Anders Trondsen - Rosenborg
- (Norway) Rafik Zekhnini - Rosenborg
- (Norway) Sander Moen Foss - Sandefjord
- (Sweden) Pontus Engblom - Sandefjord
- (Norway) Mohamed Ofkir - Sandefjord
- (Norway) Erik Mjelde - Sandefjord
- (Nigeria) Kachi - Sandnes Ulf
- (Norway) Vegard Aasen - Sandnes Ulf
- (Norway) Martin Andersen Grøttå - Sandviken
- (France) Rashad Muhammed - Sarpsborg 08
- (Nigeria) Mohammed Usman - Sarpsborg 08
- (Norway) Kristoffer Larsen - Sarpsborg 08
- (Norway) Joe Lunde - Sarpsborg 08
- (Norway) Anders Østli - Sarpsborg 08
- (Norway) Bjørn Inge Utvik - Sarpsborg 08
- (Norway) Sebastian Jensen - Senja
- (Norway) Christer Johnsgård - Senja
- (Denmark) Mustafa Hassan - Skeid
- (Norway) Ayoub Aleesami - Skeid
- (Norway) Johannes Andres Nunez Godoy - Skeid
- (Norway) Stian Pettersen - Skeid
- (Norway) Reidar Waage - Skjervøy
- (Norway) Eirik Birkelund - Sogndal
- (Norway) Joachim Soltvedt - Sogndal
- (Norway) Sigurd Hauso Haugen - Sogndal
- (Norway) Håvard Meinseth - Sola
- (Norway) Johannes Bernhard Hinna - Sola
- (Norway) Deniss Tarasovs - Sortland
- (Norway) Kristoffer Stava - Sotra
- (Norway) Ohi Omoijuanfo - Stabæk
- (Norway) Ola Brynhildsen - Stabæk
- (Norway) Martin Rønning Ovenstad - Stabæk
- (Norway) Tobias Christensen - Start
- (Jamaica) Damion Lowe - Start
- (Norway) Espen Berger - Start
- (Norway) Espen Børufsen - Start
- (Nigeria) Aremu Afeez - Start
- (Sweden) Kevin Kabran - Start
- (Sweden) Elliot Käck - Start
- (Norway) Niklas Sandberg - Start
- (Kosovo) Herolind Shala - Start
- (Bosnia and Herzegovina) Nedzad Šišić - Stjørdals-Blink
- (Norway) Sander Erik Kartum - Stjørdals-Blink
- (Norway) Simen Nordskag - Stjørdals-Blink
- (Norway) Jørgen Selnes Sollihaug - Stjørdals-Blink
- (Norway) Andreas Krokbø - Strindheim
- (Norway) Martin André Elverum Engvik - Strindheim
- (Norway) Sindre Mauritz-Hansen - Strømmen
- (Norway) Thor Lange - Strømmen
- (Norway) Petter Mathias Olsen - Strømmen
- (Norway) Sebastian Pedersen - Strømmen
- (Norway) Kristoffer Tokstad - Strømsgodset
- (Norway) Alexander Jonassen - Træff
- (Norway) Simon Laugsand - Tromsdalen
- (Norway) Andreas Løvland - Tromsdalen
- (Norway) Tor Martin Mienna - Tromsdalen
- (Norway) Anders Jenssen - Tromsdalen
- (Denmark) Oliver Kjærgaard - Tromsø
- (Norway) Mushaga Bakenga - Tromsø
- (Norway) Daniel Berntsen - Tromsø
- (Norway) Sigurd Grønli - Tromsø
- (Norway) Christian Landu Landu - Tromsø
- (Senegal) Elhadji Mour Samb - Tromsø
- (Norway) Nichlas Johansen Midtsand - Trygg/Lade
- (Norway) Stian Skjeldnes Berre - Trygg/Lade
- (Norway) Andreas Aalbu - Ullensaker/Kisa
- (Norway) Truls Jørstad - Ullensaker/Kisa
- (Norway) Eric Kitolano - Ullensaker/Kisa
- (Norway) Henrik Loholt Kristiansen - Ullensaker/Kisa
- (Somalia) Ciise Aden Abshir - Ullensaker/Kisa
- (Norway) Torbjørn Rosvoll - Ullern
- (England) Kyle Spence - Valdres
- (Norway) Simen Høglien - Valdres
- (Liberia) Sam Johnson - Vålerenga
- (Portugal) João Meira - Vålerenga
- (Nigeria) Peter Godly Michael - Vålerenga
- (Norway) Christian Borchgrevink - Vålerenga
- (Norway) Mats Kvalvågnes - Vard Haugesund
- (Norway) Steffen Klemetsen Jakobsen - Vardeneset
- (Norway) Sigve Kleppa Christensen - Vidar
- (Norway) Martin Håland - Vidar
- (Norway) Vetle Hellestø - Vidar
- (Norway) Anel Valjevcic - Vigør
- (Norway) Kawsu Jabai - Vindbjart
- (Norway) Anders Torgersen - Vestfossen

Own goals:

- (Norway) Anders Ludvigsen - Brumunddal (18 April 2018 vs Valdres)
- (Norway) Tobias Skjelle Paulsen - Lørenskog (3 May 2018 vs Lillestrøm)
- (Norway) Mads Lyngen - Bærum (9 May 2018 vs Strømsgodset)
- (Norway) William Kurtovic - Ullensaker/Kisa (9 May 2018 vs Kongsvinger IL)
