= Aalbu =

Aalbu is a Norwegian surname. Notable people with the surname include:

- Andreas Aalbu (born 1990), Norwegian footballer
- Ellen Scheel Aalbu (born 1968), Norwegian former footballer
- Jan Erik Aalbu (born 1963), Norwegian former footballer
- Ragnar Aalbu (born 1966), Norwegian illustrator
