= 2017 Rosenborg BK season =

Rosenborg
2017 season
- Chairman: Ivar Koteng
- Coach: Kåre Ingebrigtsen
- Stadium: Lerkendal Stadion
- Eliteserien: 1st
- Norwegian Cup: Quarter-finals
- Champions League: Third qualifying round vs Celtic
- Europa League: Group stage
- Top goalscorer: League: Nicklas Bendtner (19); All: Nicklas Bendtner (23)
- Highest home attendance: 21 112 vs Tromsø (16 May)
- Lowest home attendance: 15 271 vs Vålerenga (17 September)
- Average home league attendance: 17 593 ▲0.0% (19 November)
- Biggest win: 5 – 1 vs Sandefjord (8 July)
Home colours	Away colours	Third colours

The 2017 season is Rosenborg's 38th consecutive year in the top flight now known as Eliteserien, their 50th season in the top flight of Norwegian football and third season with Kåre Ingebrigtsen as permanent manager. They will participate in Eliteserien, the Cup, Mesterfinalen and the 2017–18 UEFA Champions League, entering at the Second qualifying round stage. They qualified for the group stage of the 2017–18 UEFA Europa League. This year will mark Rosenborg's 100th anniversary, an event that will be marked with the game against Lillestrøm on 20 May, one day after the 100th anniversary.

== Squad ==
Note: Flags indicate national team as defined under FIFA eligibility rules; some limited exceptions apply. Players may hold more than one non-FIFA nationality.

No.	Pos.	Nation	Player
1	GK	(Norway) NOR	André Hansen
2	DF	(Norway) NOR	Vegar Eggen Hedenstad
3	DF	(Norway) NOR	Birger Meling
4	DF	(Norway) NOR	Tore Reginiussen
5	DF	(Denmark) DEN	Jacob Rasmussen
7	MF	(Denmark) DEN	Mike Jensen (captain)
8	MF	(Norway) NOR	Anders Konradsen
9	FW	(Denmark) DEN	Nicklas Bendtner
10	FW	(Iceland) ISL	Matthías Vilhjálmsson
11	FW	(Norway) NOR	Yann-Erik de Lanlay
14	DF	(Norway) NOR	Johan Lædre Bjørdal
15	MF	(Norway) NOR	Anders Trondsen

No.	Pos.	Nation	Player
17	MF	(Sweden) SWE	Jonathan Levi
18	MF	(Norway) NOR	Magnus Stamnestrø
19	FW	(Norway) NOR	Andreas Helmersen
20	DF	(Australia) AUS	Alex Gersbach
22	MF	(Norway) NOR	Morten Konradsen
23	FW	(Norway) NOR	Pål André Helland
24	GK	(Norway) NOR	Arild Østbø
25	MF	(Norway) NOR	Marius Lundemo
26	FW	(Serbia) SRB	Milan Jevtović (on loan from Antalyaspor)
28	FW	(Nigeria) NGA	Samuel Adegbenro
34	FW	(Norway) NOR	Erik Botheim

== Transfers ==
=== Winter ===
In: Note: Flags indicate national team as defined under FIFA eligibility rules; some limited exceptions apply. Players may hold more than one non-FIFA nationality.

No.	Pos.	Nation	Player
2	DF	(Norway) NOR	Vegar Eggen Hedenstad (from (Germany) FC St. Pauli)
3	DF	(Norway) NOR	Birger Meling (from (Norway) Stabæk)
5	DF	(Denmark) DEN	Jacob Rasmussen (from (Germany) FC St. Pauli)
9	FW	(Denmark) DEN	Nicklas Bendtner (from (England) Nottingham Forest)
15	FW	(Kosovo) KOS	Elbasan Rashani (from (Denmark) Brøndby, previously on loan)
24	GK	(Norway) NOR	Arild Østbø (from (Norway) Sarpsborg 08)
25	MF	(Norway) NOR	Marius Lundemo (free agent)
26	FW	(Serbia) SRB	Milan Jevtović (on loan from (Turkey) Antalyaspor)

Out: Note: Flags indicate national team as defined under FIFA eligibility rules; some limited exceptions apply. Players may hold more than one non-FIFA nationality.

No.	Pos.	Nation	Player
2	DF	(Norway) NOR	Jonas Svensson (to (Netherlands) AZ)
5	DF	(Iceland) ISL	Hólmar Örn Eyjólfsson (to (Israel) Maccabi Haifa)
9	FW	(Denmark) DEN	Christian Gytkjær (to (Germany) TSV 1860 München)
12	GK	(Norway) NOR	Alexander Lund Hansen (Retired)
22	MF	(Norway) NOR	Sivert Solli (on loan to (Norway) Elverum)
24	GK	(Ghana) GHA	Adam Larsen Kwarasey (to (Denmark) Brøndby)
28	MF	(Iceland) ISL	Guðmundur Þórarinsson (to (Sweden) IFK Norrköping)
30	GK	(Estonia) EST	Pavel Londak (Released)
31	DF	(Norway) NOR	Per Magnus Steiring (to (Norway) Sogndal)
33	GK	(Norway) NOR	Julian Faye Lund (on loan to (Norway) Levanger)

=== Summer ===
In: Note: Flags indicate national team as defined under FIFA eligibility rules; some limited exceptions apply. Players may hold more than one non-FIFA nationality.

No.	Pos.	Nation	Player
15	MF	(Norway) NOR	Anders Trondsen (from (Norway) Sarpsborg 08)
17	MF	(Sweden) SWE	Jonathan Levi (from (Sweden) Östers IF)
22	MF	(Norway) NOR	Morten Konradsen (from (Norway) Bodø/Glimt)
28	FW	(Nigeria) NGA	Samuel Adegbenro (from (Norway) Viking)

Out: Note: Flags indicate national team as defined under FIFA eligibility rules; some limited exceptions apply. Players may hold more than one non-FIFA nationality.

No.	Pos.	Nation	Player
15	FW	(Kosovo) KOS	Elbasan Rashani (to (Norway) Odd)
17	MF	(Norway) NOR	John Hou Sæter (to (Norway) Stabæk)
21	MF	(Norway) NOR	Fredrik Midtsjø (to (Netherlands) AZ)
27	FW	(Norway) NOR	Mushaga Bakenga (to (Norway) Tromsø)
32	DF	(Norway) NOR	Erlend Dahl Reitan (on loan to (Norway) Bodø/Glimt)

== Competitions ==
=== Eliteserien ===
==== Results summary ====
Overall								Home						Away					
Pld	W	D	L	GF	GA	GD	Pts	W	D	L	GF	GA	GD	W	D	L	GF	GA	GD
30	18	7	5	57	20	+37	61	9	4	2	30	10	+20	9	3	3	27	10	+17

Last updated: 26 November 2017.
Source: see below

==== Results by round ====
Round	1	2	3	4	5	6	7	8	9	10	11	12	13	14	15	16	17	18	19	20	21	22	23	24	25	26	27	28	29	30
Ground	H	A	H	A	H	A	H	A	H	H	A	H	A	H	A	H	A	H	A	H	A	H	A	H	A	A	H	A	H	A
Result	W	W	W	W	D	W	W	D	L	D	D	W	L	W	D	W	W	W	W	L	W	W	W	D	W	W	D	L	W	L
Position	1	1	2	1	1	1	1	1	1	1	1	1	2	1	1	1	1	1	1	1	1	1	1	1	1	1	1	1	1	1

Updated to match(es) played on 26 November 2017. Source: see below
A = Away; H = Home; W = Win; D = Draw; L = Loss

==== Results ====
2 April 2017 1	Rosenborg	3–0	Odd	Trondheim
20:00 CEST (UTC+2)	Gersbach (yellow card) 32'; Bendtner 57'; Semb Berge 58' (o.g.); Jevtović 69'	Summary		Stadium: Lerkendal Stadion; Attendance: 16,804; Referee: Tore Hansen

5 April 2017 2	Sandefjord	0–3	Rosenborg	Sandefjord
19:00 CEST (UTC+2)	Bindia (yellow card) 17' (yellow-red card) 45'; Kurtovic (yellow card) 45'; Kastrati (yellow card) 78'	Summary	Hedenstad (yellow card) 4'; Vilhjálmsson 50'; Bendtner 74'; Konradsen (yellow card) 81'; Helland 85'	Stadium: Komplett Arena; Attendance: 6,103; Referee: Trond Ivar Døvle

8 April 2017 3	Rosenborg	2–1	Molde	Trondheim
18:00 CEST (UTC+2)	Jevtović 7'; Midtsjø 9'	Summary	Bendtner 21' (o.g.); Strand (yellow card) 38'; Gregersen (yellow card) 61'; Sarr (yellow card) 84'	Stadium: Lerkendal Stadion; Attendance: 20,843; Referee: Tom Harald Hagen

17 April 2017 4	Viking	0–1	Rosenborg	Stavanger
20:00 CEST (UTC+2)	Ryerson (yellow card) 36'; Haugen (yellow card) 84'	Summary	Helland 9'; Bendtner (yellow card) 45'; Jensen (yellow card) 53'; Reginiussen (yellow card) 78'	Stadium: Viking Stadion; Attendance: 6,804; Referee: Martin Lundby

23 April 2017 5	Rosenborg	0–0	Aalesund	Trondheim
18:00 CEST (UTC+2)	Meling (yellow card) 68'; Midtsjø (yellow card) 88'; Konradsen (yellow card) 90'	Summary	Kirkeskov (yellow card) 45'; Berisha (yellow card) 84'; Arnarson (yellow card) 84'; Ramsteijn (yellow card) 86'; Solnørdal (yellow card) 90'; Mos (yellow card) 90'	Stadium: Lerkendal Stadion; Attendance: 16,948; Referee: Trond Ivar Døvle

1 May 2017 6	Sarpsborg 08	1–2	Rosenborg	Sarpsborg
19:00 CEST (UTC+2)	Zachariassen (yellow card) 75'; Thomassen 79'	Summary	Bendtner 9'; Bakenga 80'; Jevtović (red card) 82'	Stadium: Sarpsborg Stadion; Attendance: 5,759; Referee: Svein Oddvar Moen

7 May 2017 7	Rosenborg	2–1	Brann	Trondheim
20:00 CET (UTC+1)	Helland 8'; Bendtner (yellow card) 53'; Konradsen 90'	Summary	Rólantsson 79'; Braaten (yellow card) 90'	Stadium: Lerkendal Stadion; Attendance: 17,020; Referee: Espen Eskås

13 May 2017 8	Stabæk	0–0	Rosenborg	Bærum
16:00 CET (UTC+1)	Moe (yellow card) 43'; Njie (yellow card) 81'	Summary	Bakenga (yellow card) 37'	Stadium: Nadderud Stadion; Attendance: 4,938; Referee: Tom Harald Hagen

16 May 2017 9	Rosenborg	1–2	Tromsø	Trondheim
20:00 CEST (UTC+2)	Vilhjálmsson 20'; Helland (yellow card) 41'; Hedenstad (yellow card) 52'; Rashani (yellow card) 90'	Summary	Åsen (yellow card) 8'; Ingebrigtsen 43'; Sigurðarson 85'; Pedersen (yellow card) 90'	Stadium: Lerkendal Stadion; Attendance: 21,112; Referee: Kai Erik Steen

20 May 2017 10	Rosenborg	1–1	Lillestrøm	Trondheim
15:30 CEST (UTC+2)	Bendtner 59'; Vilhjálmsson (yellow card) 86'	Summary	Kippe 81'; Ajeti (yellow card) 90'	Stadium: Lerkendal Stadion; Attendance: 18,947; Referee: Trygve Kjensli

28 May 2017 11	Vålerenga	1–1	Rosenborg	Oslo
20:00 CEST (UTC+2)	Grindheim (yellow card) 65'; Stengel 84'; Sandberg (yellow card) 86'	Summary	Lundemo (yellow card) 38'; Jevtović 45'; Meling (yellow card) 62'; Bendtner (yellow card) 86'; Jensen (yellow card) 90'	Stadium: Ullevaal Stadion; Attendance: 13,827; Referee: Kai Erik Steen

4 June 2017 12	Rosenborg	3–1	Strømsgodset	Trondheim
18:00 CET (UTC+1)	Glesnes 8' (o.g.); Jevtović 16'; Vilhjálmsson 53'	Summary	Glesnes (yellow card) 18'; Parr (yellow card) 49'; Ulland Andersen 68'	Stadium: Lerkendal Stadion; Attendance: 15,974; Referee: Ola Hobber Nilsen

18 June 2017 13	Haugesund	1–0	Rosenborg	Haugesund
18:00 CEST (UTC+2)	Hajradinović 3'; Knudsen (yellow card) 23'; Kiss (yellow card) 74'	Summary	Lundemo (yellow card) 51'; Meling (red card) 80'	Stadium: Haugesund Stadion; Attendance: 5,385; Referee: Trond Ivar Døvle

25 June 2017 14	Rosenborg	3–0	Sogndal	Trondheim
18:00 CEST (UTC+2)	Vilhjálmsson 61'; Jevtović 65', 67' (yellow card) 66'	Summary	Kjemhus (yellow card) 26'; Hove (yellow card) 58'	Stadium: Lerkendal Stadion; Attendance: 17,545; Referee: Tore Hansen

3 July 2017 15	Kristiansund	3–3	Rosenborg	Kristiansund
19:00 CEST (UTC+2)	Mendy 55', 61'; Sørli 83'	Summary	Vilhjálmsson 30'; Midtsjø (yellow card) 31'; Konradsen 44'; Bendtner 90'	Stadium: Kristiansund stadion Attendance: 4,126; Referee: Tommy Skjerven

8 July 2017 16	Rosenborg	5–1	Sandefjord	Trondheim
15:30 CEST (UTC+2)	Vilhjálmsson 23'; Bendtner 32' (pen.); Jensen 34'; Hedenstad 38', 75'; Meling (yellow card) 90'	Summary	Bindia (yellow card) 32'; Vallés (yellow card) 31'; Kastrati 85'	Stadium: Lerkendal Stadion; Attendance: 16,571; Referee: Martin Sleire Lundby

15 July 2017 17	Sogndal	0–3	Rosenborg	Sogndalsfjøra
15:30 CEST UTC+2	Steiring (yellow card) 63'; Dyngeland (yellow card) 77'	Summary	Jevtović 31'; Midtsjø 56'; Reginiussen (yellow card) 69'; Vilhjálmsson (yellow card) 75'; Vilhjálmsson 78'	Stadium: Fosshaugane Campus; Attendance: 4,507; Referee: Rohit Saggi

6 August 2017 18	Rosenborg	4–1	Kristiansund	Trondheim
18:00 CET (UTC+1)	Helland 13'; Bendtner 39' (pen.), 75'; Jevtović 76'	Summary	Ulvestad (yellow card) 20'; Bamba 58'	Stadium: Lerkendal Stadion; Attendance: 17,214; Referee: Svein Oddvar Moen

12 August 2017 19	Molde	1–2	Rosenborg	Molde
18:00 CEST (UTC+2)	Brustad 5'; Ssewankambo (yellow card) 90'	Summary	Jensen (yellow card) 20'; Bendtner 73'; Konradsen 85'	Stadium: Aker Stadion; Attendance: 10,720; Referee: Ola Hobber Nilsen

20 August 2017 20	Rosenborg	0–1	Haugesund	Trondheim
18:00 CEST (UTC+2)	Rasmussen (yellow card) 62'; Trondsen (yellow card) 90'	Summary	Reginiussen 26' (o.g.); Knudsen (yellow card) 53'	Stadium: Lerkendal Stadion; Attendance: 16,285; Referee: Espen Eskås

10 September 2017 21	Strømsgodset	0–2	Rosenborg	Drammen
20:00 CET (UTC+1)	Engblom (yellow card) 23'	Summary	Bendtner 61'; Adegbenro 69'	Stadium: Marienlyst Stadion; Attendance: 7,314; Referee: Tore Hansen

17 September 2017 22	Rosenborg	3–0	Vålerenga	Trondheim
18:00 CEST (UTC+2)	Bendtner 2', 45' (pen.); Bendtner (yellow card) 38'; Trondsen 69'	Summary	Lundström (yellow card) 45'; Ibrahim (yellow card) 72'	Stadium: Lerkendal Stadion; Attendance: 15,271; Referee: Kai Erik Steen

24 September 2017 23	Lillestrøm	0–3	Rosenborg	Kjeller
18:00 CEST (UTC+2)	Amundsen (yellow card) 72'	Summary	Adegbenro (yellow card) 13'; Bendtner 22', 73' (pen.); Helland 35'	Stadium: Åråsen Stadion; Attendance: 7,868; Referee: Ola Hobber Nilsen

1 October 2017 24	Rosenborg	1–1	Sarpsborg 08	Trondheim
18:00 CEST (UTC+2)	Rosted 56' (o.g.)	Summary	Rosted 65'; Halvorsen (yellow card) 68'; Rosted (yellow card) 90'	Stadium: Lerkendal Stadion; Attendance: 15,801; Referee: Svein Oddvar Moen

14 October 2017 25	Tromsø	0–3	Rosenborg	Tromsø
15:30 CEST (UTC+2)	Magnar Ødegaard (yellow card) 65'	Summary	Adegbenro 5'; Bendtner 51'; Helland 56'	Stadium: Alfheim Stadion; Attendance: 5,445; Referee: Tore Hansen

22 October 2017 26	Brann	0–3	Rosenborg	Bergen
20:00 CEST (UTC+2)	Skaanes (yellow card) 33'; Kristiansen (yellow card) 56'	Summary	Adegbenro (yellow card) 38'; Bendtner 55', 59'; Gersbach (yellow card) 64'; Trondsen (yellow card) 86'; Jevtović 90'	Stadium: Brann Stadion; Attendance: 13,619; Referee: Tom Harald Hagen

29 October 2017 27	Rosenborg	0–0	Stabæk	Trondheim
18:00 CET (UTC+1)	Hedenstad (yellow card) 57'	Summary	Skogseid (yellow card) 50'	Stadium: Lerkendal Stadion; Attendance: 20,723; Referee: Kristoffer Hagenes

5 November 2017 28	Aalesund	2–1	Rosenborg	Ålesund
18:00 CET (UTC+1)	Þrándarson (yellow card) 55'; Lie (yellow card) 56'; Gyasi (yellow card) 57'; Mos 68'; Gyasi 75'	Summary	Bendtner 55'; Jevtović (yellow card) 67'	Stadium: Color Line Stadion; Attendance: 6,105; Referee: Svein Oddvar Moen

19 November 2017 29	Rosenborg	2–0	Viking	Trondheim
18:00 CET (UTC+1)	Bendtner 8'; Trondsen 41'	Summary		Stadium: Lerkendal Stadion; Attendance: 16,834; Referee: Ola Hobber Nilsen

26 November 2017 30	Odd	1–0	Rosenborg	Skien
18:00 CET (UTC+1)	Samuelsen (yellow card) 30'; Mladenovic 53'; Rashani (yellow card) 68'	Summary		Stadium: Skagerak Arena; Attendance: 7,438; Referee: Trond Ivar Døvle

==== Table ====
Pos	Team	Pld	W	D	L	GF	GA	GD	Pts	Qualification or relegation
1	Rosenborg (C)	30	18	7	5	57	20	+37	61	Qualification for the Champions League first qualifying round
2	Molde	30	16	6	8	50	35	+15	54	Qualification for the Europa League first qualifying round
3	Sarpsborg 08	30	13	12	5	50	36	+14	51	Qualification for the Europa League first qualifying round
4	Strømsgodset	30	14	8	8	45	37	+8	50	
5	Brann	30	13	8	9	51	36	+15	47	

Source: Football Association of Norway (in Norwegian), Soccerway
Rules for classification: 1) Points; 2) Goal difference; 3) Goals scored; 4) Head-to-head points; 5) Head-to-head goal difference; 6) Head-to-head away goals scored (only if between two teams); 7) Head-to-head goals scored; 8) Play-off (only used to decide champions or relegation).
(C) Champions

=== Norwegian Cup ===
26 April 2017 First Round	Strindheim	0–2	Rosenborg	Trondheim
18:00 CEST (UTC+2)		Summary	Vilhjálmsson 9', 77'; Bjørdal (yellow card) 17'	Stadium: Strindheim Kunstgress; Attendance: 750; Referee: Kent Gomo Hammer

24 May 2017 Second Round	Tynset	1–9	Rosenborg	Tynset
18:30 CEST (UTC+2)	Ligård 79'	Summary	Jevtović 16'; Meling 36'; Vilhjálmsson 47', 90'; Reginiussen 52'; Konradsen 57'; Jensen 71'; Midtsjø 75'; Rashani 90'	Stadium: Nytrømoen; Attendance: 3,026; Referee: Mads Følstad Skarsem

31 May 2017 Third Round	Levanger	2–4	Rosenborg	Levanger
18:30 CEST (UTC+2)	Aamodt (yellow card) 47'; Tadesse 66'; Stene 89'; Berger (yellow card) 90'	Summary	Helland 36'; Vilhjálmsson 42', 67', 70'; Lundemo (yellow card) 53'	Stadium: Moan Fritidspark; Attendance: 2,078; Referee: Mathias Smehus Kringstad

9 August 2017 Fourth Round	Jerv	1–2	Rosenborg	Grimstad
18:30 CEST (UTC+2)	Haugstad 10'; Ogungbaro (yellow card) 47'; Wichmann (yellow card) 61'; Andersen (yellow card) 62'; Akintola (yellow card) 77'	Summary	Jevtović 33'; Vilhjálmsson 60'	Stadium: Levermyr stadion Attendance: 2,981; Referee: Tom Harald Hagen

27 August 2017 Quarter-finals	Rosenborg	1–2	Vålerenga	Trondheim
20:15 CEST (UTC+2)	Jevtović 12'	Summary	Dønnum 43'; Kjelsrud Johansen 74'; Zahid (yellow card) 77'; Juklerød (yellow card) 89'	Stadium: Lerkendal Stadion; Attendance: 9,195; Referee: Tom Harald Hagen

=== Mesterfinalen ===
29 March 2017 Final	Brann	0–2	Rosenborg	Bergen
19:00 CEST (UTC+2)	Vega (yellow card) 43'; Acosta (yellow card) 88'	Summary	Jevtović 32'; Rasmussen (yellow card) 43'; Jensen (yellow card) 48'; Bakenga (yellow card) 84'; Reginiussen 90'	Stadium: Brann Stadion; Attendance: 10,681; Referee: Svein Oddvar Moen

=== Champions League ===
==== Qualifying phase ====
12 July 2017 2nd qualifying round 1st leg	Dundalk (Republic of Ireland)	1–1	(Norway) Rosenborg	Dundalk, Republic of Ireland
20:45 CEST (UTC+2)	McMillan 18'	Summary	Reginiussen 44'	Stadium: Oriel Park; Attendance: 3,050; Referee: Radu Marian Petrescu, Romania

19 July 2017 2nd qualifying round 2nd leg	Rosenborg (Norway)	2–1 (a.e.t.) (3–2 agg.)	(Republic of Ireland) Dundalk	Trondheim
19:15 CEST (UTC+2)	de Lanlay 43'; Jevtović (yellow card) 74'; Vilhjálmsson 98'; Konradsen (yellow card) 119'	Summary	Gartland 12'; Duffy (yellow card) 56'; McEleney (yellow card) 59'	Stadium: Lerkendal Stadion; Attendance: 14,817; Referee: Aliyar Aghayev, Azerbaijan

26 July 2017 3rd qualifying round 1st leg	Celtic (Scotland)	0–0	(Norway) Rosenborg	Glasgow, Scotland
20:45 CEST (UTC+2)	Ajer (yellow card) 79'	Summary	Vilhjálmsson (yellow card) 81'	Stadium: Celtic Park; Attendance: 49,172; Referee: Tiago Martins, Portugal

2 August 2017 3rd qualifying round 2nd leg	Rosenborg (Norway)	0–1 (0–1 agg.)	(Scotland) Celtic	Trondheim
20:45 CEST (UTC+2)	Jevtović (yellow card) 37'; Helland (yellow card) 75'	Summary	Forrest 69'	Stadium: Lerkendal Stadion; Attendance: 20,967; Referee: Jonathan Lardot, Belgium

=== UEFA Europa League ===
==== Qualifying rounds ====
17 August 2017 Play-off round 1st Leg	Ajax (Netherlands)	0–1	(Norway) Rosenborg	Amsterdam, Netherlands
20:45 CEST (UTC+2)	Kluivert (yellow card) 74'; Schöne (yellow card) 90'; Dijks (yellow card) 90'	Summary	Bjørdal (yellow card) 9' de Lanlay (yellow card) 62'; Adegbenro 77'	Stadium: Amsterdam Arena; Referee: Craig Thomson, Scotland

24 August 2017 Play-off round 2nd Leg	Rosenborg (Norway)	3–2 (4–2 agg.)	(Netherlands) Ajax	Trondheim
20:45 CEST (UTC+2)	Midtsjø (yellow card) 21'; Bendtner 25'; Meling (yellow card) 48'; Adegbenro 80', 89' (yellow card) 89'	Summary	Viergever (yellow card) 45'; Younes 60'; Schöne 61'; Veltman (yellow card) 87'	Stadium: Lerkendal Stadion; Attendance: 21,211; Referee: Ruddy Buquet, France

==== Group stage ====
Pos	Team	Pld	W	D	L	GF	GA	GD	Pts	Qualification	ZEN	RS	ROS	VRD
1	(Russia) Zenit Saint Petersburg	6	5	1	0	17	5	+12	16	Advance to knockout phase	—	3–1	3–1	2–1
2	(Spain) Real Sociedad	6	4	0	2	16	6	+10	12	Advance to knockout phase	1–3	—	4–0	3–0
3	(Norway) Rosenborg	6	1	2	3	6	11	−5	5		1–1	0–1	—	3–1
4	(North Macedonia) Vardar	6	0	1	5	3	20	−17	1		0–5	0–6	1–1	—

Source: UEFA
Rules for classification: Group stage tiebreakers

14 September 2017 1	Real Sociedad (Spain)	4–0	(Norway) Rosenborg	San Sebastián, Spain
21:05 CEST (UTC+2)	Llorente 9', 77'; Zurutuza 10'; Skjelvik 41' (o.g.)	Summary	Reginiussen (yellow card) 90'	Stadium: Anoeta; Attendance: 21,429; Referee: Paolo Mazzoleni (Italy)

28 September 2017 2	Rosenborg (Norway)	3–1	(North Macedonia) Vardar	Trondheim
19:00 CEST (UTC+2)	Bendtner 25' (pen.); Konradsen 56'; Hedenstad 68'; Skjelvik (yellow card) 79'	Summary	Musliu (yellow card) 24'; Jighauri (yellow card) 41'; Demiri (yellow card) 43'; Juan Felipe 90'	Stadium: Lerkendal Stadion; Attendance: 16,038; Referee: Georgi Kabakov (Bulgaria)

19 October 2017 3	Zenit Saint Petersburg (Russia)	3–1	(Norway) Rosenborg	Saint Petersburg, Russia
19:00 CEST (UTC+2)	Rigoni 2', 68', 75'; Paredes (yellow card) 39'	Summary	Hedenstad (yellow card) 14'; Trondsen (yellow card) 35'; Helland 88'	Stadium: Krestovsky Stadium; Referee: Tobias Stieler (Germany)

2 November 2017 4	Rosenborg (Norway)	1–1	(Russia) Zenit Saint Petersburg	Trondheim
21:05 CET (UTC+1)	Reginiussen (yellow card) 42'; Bendtner 55' (pen.)	Summary	Yerokhin (yellow card) 33'; Criscito (yellow card) 73'; Kokorin 90'	Stadium: Lerkendal Stadion; Attendance: 18,597; Referee: Serdar Gözübüyük (Netherlands)

23 November 2017 5	Rosenborg (Norway)	0–1	(Spain) Real Sociedad	Trondheim
19:00 CET (UTC+1)	Skjelvik (yellow card) 90'	Summary	Oyarzabal 90'; Martínez (yellow card) 90'	Stadium: Lerkendal Stadion; Attendance: 18,307; Referee: Daniel Stefanski (Poland)

7 December 2017 6	Vardar (North Macedonia)	1–1	(Norway) Rosenborg	Skopje, Macedonia
21:05 CET (UTC+1)	Ytalo 9'; Barseghyan (yellow card) 72'	Summary	Bendtner 45' (pen.)	Stadium: Philip II Arena; Referee: Serhiy Boiko (Ukraine)

=== Club Friendlies ===
28 January 2017	Rosenborg	3–1	Ranheim	Hommelvik
14:00 UTC (UTC+1)	Jevtović 10', 56'; Vilhjálmsson 51'	Summary	Rye 77'	Stadium: Abrahallen

5 February 2017	Red Bull Salzburg (Austria)	2–0	(Norway) Rosenborg	Salzburg, Austria
14:00 UTC (UTC+1)	Hwang 51'; Minamino 76'	Summary

11 February 2017	FC København (Denmark)	0–2	(Norway) Rosenborg	Copenhagen, Denmark
13:00 UTC (UTC+1)		Summary	Bakenga 8'; Helland 45'	Stadium: Parken

25 February 2017	Rosenborg (Norway)	1–1	(Sweden) GIF Sundsvall	Hommelvik
15:00 UTC (UTC+1)	Rashani 19'	Summary	Pirttijoki 65'	Stadium: Abrahallen

5 March 2017	Malmö FF (Sweden)	1–1	(Norway) Rosenborg	Malmö, Sweden
14:00 UTC (UTC+1)	Eikrem 37'	Summary	Jevtović 58' (pen.)	Stadium: Swedbank Stadion

8 March 2017	Rosenborg (Norway)	2–1	(Finland) HJK	Marbella, Spain
17:00 UTC (UTC+1)	Konradsen 76'; Vilhjálmsson 90'	Summary	Morelos 63'

12 March 2017	Rosenborg (Norway)	1–1	(Iceland) Hafnarfjarðar	Marbella, Spain
13:05 UTC (UTC+1)	Vilhjálmsson 17'	Summary	Finnbogason 49'

17 March 2017	Rosenborg	4–1	Ranheim	Hommelvik
15:30 UTC (UTC+1)	Reginiussen 44'; Midtsjø 76'; Bakenga 82', 88'	Summary	Gjertsen 75'	Stadium: Abrahallen

5 September 2017	Rosenborg	2–0	Strindheim	Trondheim
17:00 CEST (UTC+2)	Skarsem ?'; Tørset Johnsen ?'	Summary		Stadium: Skoglunden

== Squad statistics ==
=== Appearances and goals ===
As of match played 7 December 2017

No.	Pos	Nat	Player	Total		Eliteserien		Norwegian Cup		Mesterfinalen		Champions League		Europa League	
No.	Pos	Nat	Player	Apps	Goals	Apps	Goals	Apps	Goals	Apps	Goals	Apps	Goals	Apps	Goals
1	GK	(Norway) NOR	André Hansen	38	0	25+0	0	0+0	0	1+0	0	4+0	0	8+0	0
2	DF	(Norway) NOR	Vegar Eggen Hedenstad	38	3	27+0	2	0+0	0	1+0	0	4+0	0	6+0	1
3	DF	(Norway) NOR	Birger Meling	36	1	19+1	0	3+2	1	0+0	0	3+0	0	8+0	0
4	DF	(Norway) NOR	Tore Reginiussen	35	3	23+1	0	1+0	1	0+1	1	3+0	1	6+0	0
5	DF	(Denmark) DEN	Jacob Rasmussen	17	0	9+1	0	1+0	0	1+0	0	0+0	0	4+1	0
7	MF	(Denmark) DEN	Mike Jensen	45	2	26+3	1	4+0	1	1+0	0	4+0	0	7+0	0
8	MF	(Norway) NOR	Anders Konradsen	35	5	19+3	3	2+1	1	1+0	0	4+0	0	5+0	1
9	FW	(Denmark) DEN	Nicklas Bendtner	44	23	27+2	19	2+0	0	0+1	0	4+0	0	8+0	4
10	FW	(Iceland) ISL	Matthías Vilhjálmsson	30	16	9+9	7	4+1	8	1+0	0	1+3	1	0+2	0
11	FW	(Norway) NOR	Yann-Erik de Lanlay	19	1	4+4	0	1+1	0	0+0	0	3+1	1	4+1	0
14	DF	(Norway) NOR	Johan Lædre Bjørdal	31	0	12+6	0	4+0	0	1+0	0	2+1	0	4+1	0
15	MF	(Norway) NOR	Anders Trondsen	17	2	8+2	2	1+0	0	0+0	0	0+0	0	5+1	0
16	DF	(Norway) NOR	Jørgen Skjelvik	35	0	20+1	0	3+0	0	0+0	0	4+0	0	6+1	0
17	FW	(Sweden) SWE	Jonathan Levi	10	0	2+5	0	0+1	0	0+0	0	0+0	0	1+1	0
18	MF	(Norway) NOR	Magnus Stamnestrø	0	0	0+0	0	0+0	0	0+0	0	0+0	0	0+0	0
19	FW	(Norway) NOR	Andreas Helmersen	1	0	0+1	0	0+0	0	0+0	0	0+0	0	0+0	0
20	DF	(Australia) AUS	Alex Gersbach	25	0	9+6	0	4+0	0	1+0	0	0+0	0	1+4	0
22	MF	(Norway) NOR	Morten Konradsen	6	0	2+2	0	0+0	0	0+0	0	0+0	0	2+0	0
23	FW	(Norway) NOR	Pål André Helland	31	8	21+1	6	3+0	1	0+1	0	1+1	0	1+2	1
24	GK	(Norway) NOR	Arild Østbø	11	0	5+1	0	5+0	0	0+0	0	0+0	0	0+0	0
25	MF	(Norway) NOR	Marius Lundemo	27	0	15+3	0	3+1	0	0+0	0	0+1	0	2+2	0
26	FW	(Serbia) SRB	Milan Jevtović	41	13	18+7	9	4+1	3	1+0	1	3+1	0	2+4	0
28	FW	(Nigeria) NGA	Samuel Adegbenro	19	5	7+3	2	1+0	0	0+0	0	0+0	0	6+2	3
34	FW	(Norway) NOR	Erik Botheim	6	0	0+3	0	1+1	0	0+0	0	0+0	0	0+1	0
Players away from Rosenborg on loan:
22	MF	(Norway) NOR	Sivert Solli	0	0	0+0	0	0+0	0	0+0	0	0+0	0	0+0	0
32	DF	(Norway) NOR	Erlend Dahl Reitan	4	0	0+1	0	3+0	0	0+0	0	0+0	0	0+0	0
33	GK	(Norway) NOR	Julian Faye Lund	0	0	0+0	0	0+0	0	0+0	0	0+0	0	0+0	0
Players who appeared for Rosenborg no longer at the club:
15	FW	(Kosovo) KOS	Elbasan Rashani	12	1	2+6	0	0+1	1	1+0	0	0+2	0	0+0	0
17	MF	(Norway) NOR	John Hou Sæter	0	0	0+0	0	0+0	0	0+0	0	0+0	0	0+0	0
21	MF	(Norway) NOR	Fredrik Midtsjø	30	3	16+4	2	3+0	1	1+0	0	4+0	0	2+0	0
27	FW	(Norway) NOR	Mushaga Bakenga	14	1	3+7	1	1+2	0	0+1	0	0+0	0	0+0	0

=== Disciplinary record ===
As of match played 7 December 2017

Number	Nation	Position	Name	Eliteserien		Norwegian Cup		Mesterfinalen		Champions League		Europa League		Total	
Number	Nation	Position	Name	Booked	Sent off (straight red)	Booked	Sent off (straight red)	Booked	Sent off (straight red)	Booked	Sent off (straight red)	Booked	Sent off (straight red)	Booked	Sent off (straight red)
1	(Norway)	GK	André Hansen	0	0	0	0	0	0	0	0	0	0	0	0
2	(Norway)	DF	Vegar Eggen Hedenstad	3	0	0	0	0	0	0	0	1	0	4	0
3	(Norway)	DF	Birger Meling	3	1	0	0	0	0	0	0	1	0	4	1
4	(Norway)	DF	Tore Reginiussen	2	0	0	0	0	0	0	0	2	0	4	0
5	(Denmark)	DF	Jacob Rasmussen	1	0	0	0	1	0	0	0	0	0	2	0
7	(Denmark)	MF	Mike Jensen	3	0	0	0	1	0	0	0	0	0	4	0
8	(Norway)	MF	Anders Konradsen	2	0	0	0	0	0	1	0	0	0	3	0
9	(Denmark)	FW	Nicklas Bendtner	4	0	0	0	0	0	0	0	0	0	4	0
10	(Iceland)	FW	Matthías Vilhjálmsson	1	0	0	0	0	0	1	0	0	0	2	0
11	(Norway)	FW	Yann-Erik de Lanlay	0	0	0	0	0	0	0	0	1	0	1	0
14	(Norway)	DF	Johan Lædre Bjørdal	0	0	1	0	0	0	0	0	1	0	2	0
15	(Norway)	MF	Anders Trondsen	2	0	0	0	0	0	0	0	1	0	3	0
16	(Norway)	DF	Jørgen Skjelvik	0	0	0	0	0	0	0	0	2	0	2	0
17	(Sweden)	FW	Jonathan Levi	0	0	0	0	0	0	0	0	0	0	0	0
18	(Norway)	DF	Magnus Stamnestrø	0	0	0	0	0	0	0	0	0	0	0	0
19	(Norway)	FW	Andreas Helmersen	0	0	0	0	0	0	0	0	0	0	0	0
20	(Australia)	DF	Alex Gersbach	2	0	0	0	0	0	0	0	0	0	2	0
22	(Norway)	MF	Morten Konradsen	0	0	0	0	0	0	0	0	0	0	0	0
23	(Norway)	FW	Pål André Helland	1	0	0	0	0	0	0	0	0	0	1	0
24	(Norway)	GK	Arild Østbø	0	0	0	0	0	0	0	0	0	0	0	0
25	(Norway)	MF	Marius Lundemo	2	0	1	0	0	0	0	0	0	0	3	0
26	(Serbia)	FW	Milan Jevtović	2	1	0	0	0	0	1	0	0	0	3	1
28	(Nigeria)	FW	Samuel Adegbenro	2	0	0	0	0	0	0	0	1	0	3	0
34	(Norway)	FW	Erik Botheim	0	0	0	0	0	0	0	0	0	0	0	0
Players away from Rosenborg on loan:
22	(Norway)	MF	Sivert Solli	0	0	0	0	0	0	0	0	0	0	0	0
32	(Norway)	DF	Erlend Dahl Reitan	0	0	0	0	0	0	0	0	0	0	0	0
33	(Norway)	GK	Julian Faye Lund	0	0	0	0	0	0	0	0	0	0	0	0
Players who appeared for Rosenborg no longer at the club:
15	(Kosovo)	FW	Elbasan Rashani	1	0	0	0	0	0	0	0	0	0	1	0
17	(Norway)	MF	John Hou Sæter	0	0	0	0	0	0	0	0	0	0	0	0
21	(Norway)	MF	Fredrik Midtsjø	2	0	0	0	0	0	0	0	1	0	3	0
27	(Norway)	FW	Mushaga Bakenga	1	0	0	0	1	0	0	0	0	0	2	0
			TOTALS	34	2	2	0	5	0	3	0	11	0	55	2

== See also ==
- Rosenborg BK seasons
