= Anders Konradsen =

Norwegian footballer (born 1990)

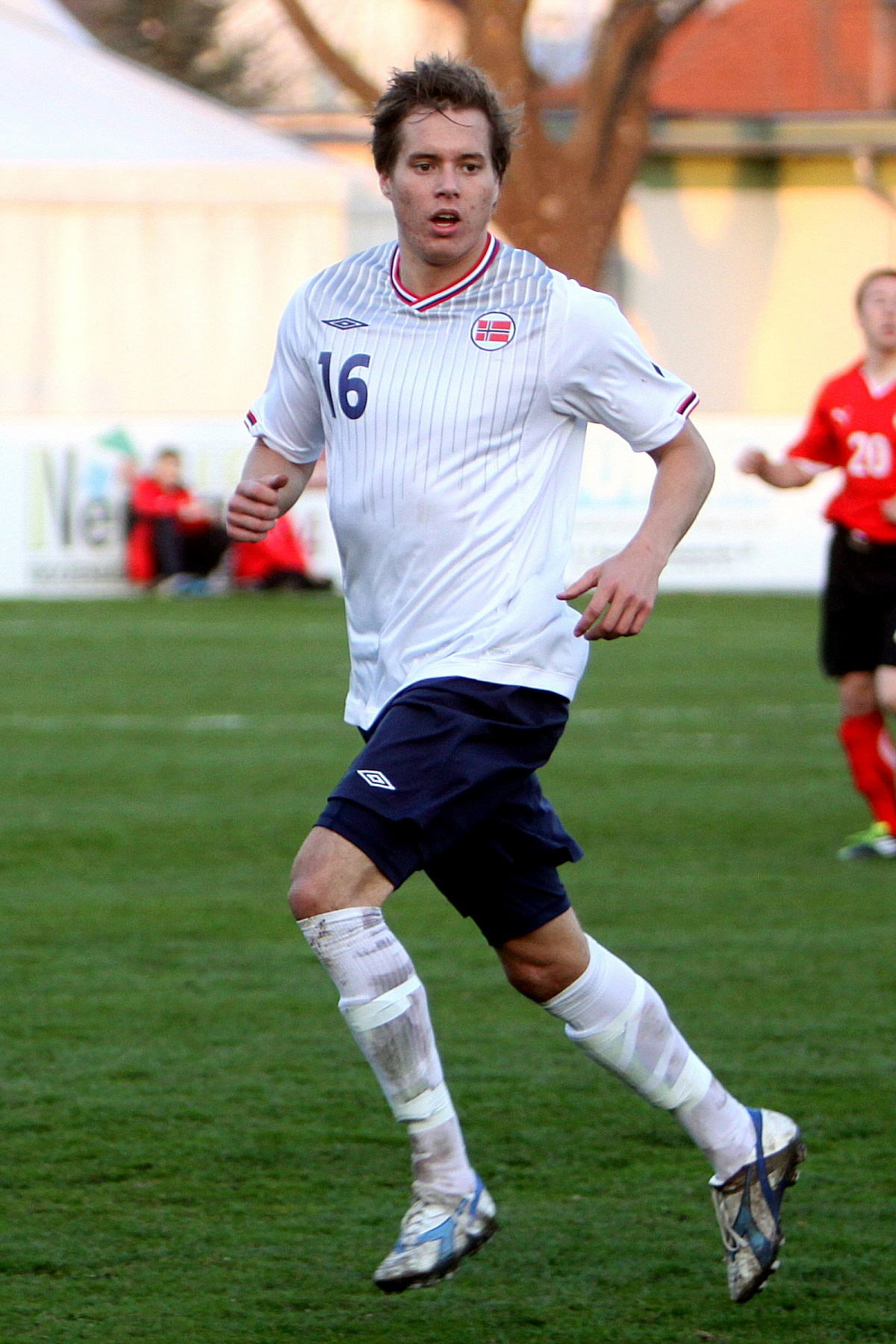
- Konradsen playing for Norway U21 in 2011

Personal information
- Full name: Anders Ågnes Konradsen
- Date of birth: 18 July 1990 (age 36)
- Place of birth: Bodø, Norway
- Position: Midfielder

Senior career*
Years	Team	Apps	(Gls)
2007–2011	Bodø/Glimt	68	(11)
2011–2013	Strømsgodset	57	(5)
2013–2015	Rennes	49	(3)
2013–2014	Rennes B	5	(0)
2015–2021	Rosenborg	122	(20)
2022	Bodø/Glimt	7	(0)

International career^{‡}
2006	Norway U16	4	(1)
2007	Norway U17	5	(2)
2008	Norway U18	9	(0)
2009	Norway U19	3	(1)
2010–2013	Norway U21	14	(1)
2011	Norway U23	1	(0)
2012–2014	Norway	8	(1)
- * Club domestic league appearances and goals as of 30 July 2022 ‡ National team caps and goals as of 12 June 2015

Anders Ågnes Konradsen (born 18 July 1990) is a Norwegian former professional footballer. He has previously played for the Norwegian clubs Bodø/Glimt, Strømsgodset and Rosenborg, and the French club Rennes. He was a part of the Norwegian team that played in the 2013 UEFA European Under-21 Championship, and has also been capped for Norway at senior level.

== Early years ==
Konradsen was born in Bodø, where he also grew up. He is an older brother of fellow footballer Morten Konradsen.

He was promoted to Bodø/Glimt's first-team squad along with Stefan Johansen ahead of the 2007 season, and Konradsen made his first-team debut against Lofoten in the second round of the 2007 Norwegian Football Cup. He first represented Norway at under-16 level, and after his performances for the under-18 team he was wanted by the Italian side Sampdoria.

== Club career ==
Konradsen made his break-through in Bodø/Glimt's first team in the 2009 season, and played 26 matches as a winger for the team that was relegated from Tippeligaen. In the following season, he was Bodø/Glimt's top goalscorer in the First Division with nine goals.

After the 2010 season, Konradsen was wanted by Tromsø and Aalesund in addition to Ole Gunnar Solskjær's Molde, but joined Strømsgodset ahead of the 2011 season in a deal where Jim Johansen transferred the other way.

Konradsen was sold to the French club Rennes for 15 million NOK in January 2013, and became the most expensive player Strømsgodset had ever sold. He made his debut for Rennes in the Ligue 1 in the 2–0 victory against Toulouse on 10 February 2013.

On 16 August 2015 Rosenborg signed Konradsen on a three-and-a-half-year contract for an undisclosed sum.

== International career ==
Konradsen has represented Norway from under-16 to under-23 level, and was included in the Norwegian under-21 squad for the 2013 UEFA European Under-21 Championship. Konradsen started the opening match against Israel U-21, and had one shot in the crossbar and another in the post when Norway drew 2–2. In the second match of the tournament against England U21, Harmeet Singh was chosen ahead of Konradsen in the starting line-up.

Konradsen made his debut for the senior team in the friendly match against Hungary in November 2012, and was also called up for the friendly matches against South Africa and Zambia in January 2013, but withdrew from the squad due to sickness.

== Career statistics ==
=== Club ===
As of match played 24 August 2022

Appearances and goals by club, season and competition
Club	Season	League			National Cup		Europe		Other		Total	
Club	Season	Division	Apps	Goals	Apps	Goals	Apps	Goals	Apps	Goals	Apps	Goals
Bodø/Glimt	2007	Adeccoligaen	7	0	0	0	–		–		7	0
Bodø/Glimt	2008	Tippeligaen	8	0	4	1	–		–		12	1
Bodø/Glimt	2009	Tippeligaen	26	2	2	0	–		–		28	2
Bodø/Glimt	2010	Adeccoligaen	27	9	2	0	–		–		29	9
Bodø/Glimt	Total		68	11	8	1	–		–		76	12
Strømsgodset	2011	Tippeligaen	28	4	4	1	2	0	–		34	5
Strømsgodset	2012	Tippeligaen	29	1	5	3	–		–		34	4
Strømsgodset	Total		57	5	9	4	2	0	–		68	9
Rennes	2012–13	Ligue 1	6	0	0	0	–		–		6	0
Rennes	2013–14	Ligue 1	24	1	4	1	–		–		28	2
Rennes	2014–15	Ligue 1	19	2	8	2	–		–		27	4
Rennes	Total		49	3	12	3	–		–		61	6
Rosenborg	2015	Tippeligaen	9	4	2	0	8	0	–		19	4
Rosenborg	2016	Tippeligaen	26	4	6	0	6	0	–		38	4
Rosenborg	2017	Eliteserien	22	3	3	1	9	1	1	0	35	5
Rosenborg	2018	Eliteserien	18	5	3	2	9	0	–		30	7
Rosenborg	2019	Eliteserien	20	2	3	1	10	5	–		33	8
Rosenborg	2020	Eliteserien	11	0	0	0	2	2	–		13	2
Rosenborg	2021	Eliteserien	16	2	2	1	6	0	–		24	3
Rosenborg	Total		122	20	19	5	50	8	1	0	192	33
Bodø/Glimt	2022	Eliteserien	7	0	3	0	5	0	–		15	0
Bodø/Glimt	Total		7	0	3	0	5	0	0	0	15	0
Career total			304	39	51	13	57	8	1	0	412	60

== Honours ==
Rosenborg

- Eliteserien: 2015, 2016, 2017, 2018
- Norwegian Football Cup: 2015, 2016, 2018
- Mesterfinalen: 2017

Norway U21

- UEFA European Under-21 Championship bronze: 2013
