= Rasmus Christensen =

Danish footballer (born 1991)

Personal information
- Full name: Rasmus Lynge Christensen
- Date of birth: 12 August 1991 (age 35)
- Place of birth: Denmark
- Height: 1.76 m (5 ft 9 1/2 in)
- Position: Winger

Team information
- Current team: Arendal
- Number: 8

Youth career
- –2006: Jyderup Boldklub
- 2006–2007: Holbæk B&I
- 2007–2010: FC Midtjylland

Senior career*
Years	Team	Apps	(Gls)
2010–2013	FC Midtjylland	1	(0)
2012	→ FC Fredericia (loan)	6	(0)
2013	→ Hobro IK (loan)	8	(0)
2013–2016	Hobro IK	36	(1)
2016–2019	Arendal	43	(21)
2020	Hisøy IL	0	(0)
2021–	Arendal	61	(12)

International career
2007	Denmark U-17	2	(1)
2008	Denmark U-18	6	(1)
- * Club domestic league appearances and goals as of 1 December 2023

Rasmus Christensen (born 12 August 1991) is a professional footballer who plays as a winger for Norwegian club Arendal.

== Life and career ==
=== Club career ===
Christensen came through the youth system at FC Midtjylland. He made his first team debut near the end of the 2010-11 season, coming on as a second-half substitute for Adigun Salami in a 5–2 defeat away to eventual champions FC Copenhagen.

FC Midtjylland finished the season in fourth place, earning qualification to the following season's UEFA Europa League. In July 2011, Christensen was named in the squad to face Welsh club The New Saints in the second qualifying round of the 2011–12 Europa League.

In a friendly match warm up for this European tie, against German 2.Bundesliga side St Pauli, Christensen suffered a cruciate ligament injury. It is expected that he will be out of the game for around nine months and be unable to participate in most of the 2011–12 campaign.

Rasmus Christensen scored a late 92nd minute consolation goal for his team against Sandnes Ulf, the goal had very little significance to the result. However the goal made Joe Hobkirk, a long life fan of Arendal very happy. The goal made the young 21 year old £1,815, oioi sesh one.

In August 2016, Christensen joined Norwegian club Arendal Fotball. He left the club at the end of 2019. He joined Hisøy IL for the 2020 season.

=== International career ===
Christensen has gained international recognition for Denmark at under-17 and under-18 levels. He played two games in the 2008 UEFA European Under-17 Football Championship qualifying round, scoring once in a 2–0 victory against the Ukraine under-17s. With the under-18s, he scored one goal in six appearances in 2008.
