= Nikica Košutić =

Serbian footballer

Personal information
- Full name: Nikica Košutić
- Date of birth: 7 December 1985 (age 40)
- Place of birth: Zemun, SFR Yugoslavia
- Height: 1.77 m (5 ft 10 in)
- Position: Centre forward

Team information
- Current team: Medkila

Senior career*
Years	Team	Apps	(Gls)
2003–2007	Zemun	13	(0)
2007	→ Beograd (loan)	23	(3)
2007	Bežanija	17	(1)
2008	Chernomorets	15	(0)
2008–2009	Ethnikos Filippiada	36	(10)
2009–2010	Anagennisi Karditsa	11	(1)
2011–2012	Al Hazm Ar Rass	10	(0)
2012	Radnički Nova Pazova	14	(0)
2013–2014	Inđija	17	(3)
2014–2015	Iraklis Psachna	10	(0)
2015	Fokikos	18	(9)
2016	Chalkis	12	(2)
2017–2018	Harstad	27	(10)
2019	Medkila	12	(2)
2020	Jadran Golubinci		
2021	Radnički Irig		
2021-2022	Jadran Golubinci		
- * Club domestic league appearances and goals as of 11 October 2025

Nikica Košutić (Serbian Cyrillic: Никица Кошутић; born 7 December 1985) is a Serbian retired football forward.
