= Filipe Ferreira (footballer, born October 1996) =

Portuguese footballer

Personal information
- Full name: Filipe Gabriel Gonçalves Ferreira
- Date of birth: 26 October 1996 (age 30)
- Place of birth: Bombarral, Portugal
- Height: 1.82 m (6 ft 0 in)
- Position: Midfielder

Team information
- Current team: Caldas
- Number: 4

Youth career
- 2004–2005: Bombarralense
- 2005–2015: Benfica
- 2013: → Oeiras (loan)
- 2014: → Casa Pia (loan)

Senior career*
Years	Team	Apps	(Gls)
2015–2017	Benfica B	19	(1)
2017–2018	Istra 1961	3	(0)
2018–2019	Notodden	26	(0)
2020	Sertanense	1	(0)
2020–2021	Salgueiros	11	(0)
2021	Cova Piedade	2	(0)
2022–2023	Belenenses	32	(0)
2023–2025	Atlético	33	(0)
2025–	Caldas	26	(0)

International career
2014	Portugal U18	5	(0)
- * Club domestic league appearances and goals as of 03:58, 27 August 2026 (UTC)

Filipe Gabriel Gonçalves Ferreira (born 26 October 1996) is a Portuguese professional footballer who plays as a midfielder for Liga 3 club Caldas.

== Club career ==
Ferreira was born in Bombarral, Leiria District, and joined S.L. Benfica's youth system at the age of 8. On 12 September 2015, he made his senior debut with the reserve side, coming on as a late substitute in a 2–0 home win against Académico de Viseu FC. On 24 November, also in the Segunda Liga and from the bench, he helped the hosts to defeat Clube Oriental de Lisboa 2–1 by scoring with 15 minutes left.

On 18 August 2017, the 20-year-old Ferreira and teammate Rodrigo Escoval were sold to NK Istra 1961 from the Croatian Football League, as Mato Miloš moved in the opposite direction. The following February, he signed with Norwegian First Division club Notodden FK.

Ferreira subsequently returned to Portugal, where he represented a host of teams in the lower leagues.
