= Slattum =

- Village
- Location within Akershus Location within Norway
- Coordinates: 60°00′34″N 10°55′13″E
- Country: Norway
- Region: Østlandet
- County: Akershus
- Municipality: Nittedal
- Time zone: UTC+01:00 (CET)
  - Summer (DST): UTC+02:00 (CEST)
- Post Code: 1480

Slattum is a village in Nittedal, Akershus, Norway.
