= Daniel Stensøe =

Norwegian footballer (born 1994)

Personal information
- Date of birth: 10 September 1994 (age 32)
- Position: Midfielder

Team information
- Current team: Spjelkavik

Youth career
- Blindheim
- Herd
- Aalesund

Senior career*
Years	Team	Apps	(Gls)
2012	Herd	21	(2)
2013	Aalesund	2	(0)
2014	Herd	10	(0)
2015	Emblem	5	(0)
2016	Spjelkavik IL	24	(2)
2017–2018	Brattvåg IL	50	(8)
2019–	Spjelkavik IL	14	(2)
- * Club domestic league appearances and goals as of 1 January 2020

Daniel Stensøe (born 10 September 1994) is a Norwegian footballer who plays as a midfielder for Spjelkavik IL.

He started his career in SK Herd and joined the Tippeligaen side Aalesund after the 2012 season. He made his debut for Aalesund as a substitute against Brann in May 2013. Ahead of the 2014 season he went back to Herd.
