= Ermal Hajdari =

Swedish footballer (born 1992)

Personal information
- Date of birth: 4 December 1992 (age 33)
- Place of birth: Sweden
- Height: 1.78 m (5 ft 10 in)
- Positions: Winger; striker

Team information
- Current team: Levanger FK
- Number: 7

Youth career
- 2014: Nike Academy

Senior career*
Years	Team	Apps	(Gls)
2011–2013	Kristianstads FF	13	(2)
2015	FCI Tallinn	26	(6)
2016	Nosaby IF	12	(3)
2016–2017	Tasman United	18	(4)
2017	Whitehawk FC	7	(0)
2018–2019	Levanger FK	50	(8)
2020	Egersunds IK	18	(8)
2021	Arendal Fotball	24	(5)
2022–	Levanger FK	97	(13)
- * Club domestic league appearances and goals as of 15 November 2026

Ermal Hajdari (born 4 December 1992) is a Swedish footballer who plays as a winger or striker for Levanger FK.

== Early life ==
Hajdari was born in 1992 in Sweden. He participated in Swedish television program Proffsdrömmen. He is of Kosovan descent.

== Career ==
In 2015, Hajdari signed for Estonian side FCI Tallinn. He helped the club achieve qualify for the UEFA Europa League. In 2016, he signed for New Zealand side Tasman United. He was described as "after... three rounds... already clear... [he] will be... [the club's] biggest threat on attack".

== Style of play ==
Hajdari mainly operates as a winger or striker. He is known for his passing ability.

== Personal life ==
Hajdari grew up in Kristianstad, Sweden. He has regarded Sweden international Zlatan Ibrahimovic as his football idol.
