= Vegar Eggen Hedenstad =

Norwegian footballer (born 1991)

Vegar Hedenstad
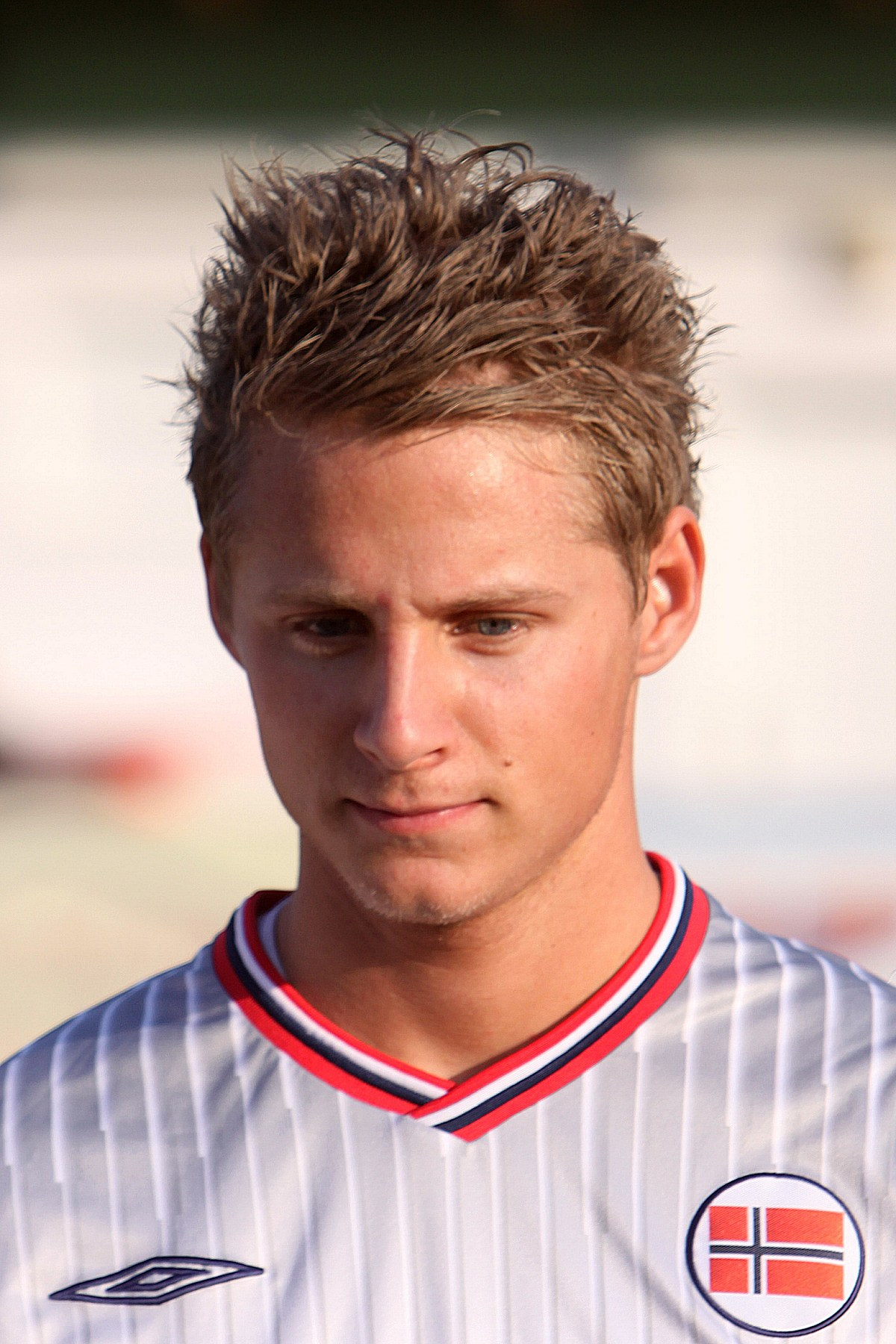
- Hedenstad with Norway U21 in 2011

Personal information
- Full name: Vegar Eggen Hedenstad
- Date of birth: 26 June 1991 (age 35)
- Place of birth: Elverum, Norway
- Height: 1.78 m (5 ft 10 in)
- Position: Right-back

Team information
- Current team: Vålerenga
- Number: 6

Youth career
- Elverum

Senior career*
Years	Team	Apps	(Gls)
2006–2007	Elverum		
2008–2012	Stabæk	94	(6)
2012–2016	SC Freiburg	23	(0)
2012–2016	SC Freiburg II	9	(0)
2014–2015	→ Eintracht Braunschweig (loan)	28	(1)
2016–2017	FC St. Pauli	15	(0)
2017–2020	Rosenborg	100	(5)
2021–2022	Fatih Karagümrük	32	(1)
2022–	Vålerenga	96	(4)

International career^{‡}
2008	Norway U17	13	(2)
2010	Norway U19	5	(0)
2010–2013	Norway U21	22	(0)
2011	Norway U23	1	(0)
2012–2013	Norway	4	(0)
- * Club domestic league appearances and goals as of 23 July 2026 ‡ National team caps and goals as of 15 June 2013

Vegar Eggen Hedenstad (born 26 June 1991) is a Norwegian professional footballer who plays as a right-back for Norwegian First Division club Vålerenga. Hedenstad has been capped at international level for Norway

== Club career ==
Hedenstad was born in Elverum Municipality and played for Elverum Fotball where he made his senior debut in the Third Division in 2006, at the age of 14 and became the youngest ever senior player at the team. At the age of 16, Hedenstad played on a team consisting of local talents in a show-match against HamKam, and HamKam's head coach Arne Erlandsen approached Hedenstad immediately after the match and stated that he wanted to sign him. However, Hedenstad signed for Stabæk and joined the club ahead of the 2008 season.

Hedenstad made his debut in Tippeligaen on 7 June 2008 against Strømsgodset and made a total of three appearances during the 2008 season when Stabæk won Tippeligaen, enough to earn him a championship-medal. The next season, Hedenstad was playing regularly on the team that finished third in Tippeligaen and won bronze-medals.

On 17 July 2012, Hedenstad signed a four-year deal with Bundesliga outfit SC Freiburg, and became the second footballer from Elverum in the Bundesliga, after Terje Olsen who played for Bayer Leverkusen in the 1980s. He was injured after five minutes in his first match for Freiburg, during the team's pre-season tour to Austria. Hedenstad made his debut in the Bundesliga when Freiburg lost 2–0 to Bayer Leverkusen on 1 September 2012.

On 4 July 2014, Hedenstad joined Eintracht Braunschweig on a one-year loan deal.

Hedenstad joined FC St. Pauli in the summer 2016.

In February 2017 he joined Rosenborg. In December 2020 it was announced Hedenstad would leave Rosenborg after 4 seasons after his contract expired at the end of the year.

On 5 January 2021, Hedenstad signed for Süper Lig club Fatih Karagümrük.

== International career ==
Hedenstad has represented Norway at every level from under-15 to under-23, and was playing regularly as a right back for the under-21 team in the 2013 UEFA European Under-21 Football Championship qualification, when the team qualified for the championship.

Hedenstad made his debut for the national team when he replaced Lars Christopher Vilsvik at half time in a 1–1 friendly draw against Denmark on 15 January 2012. He was again called up for the friendly match against Hungary in October 2012. In the absence of John Arne Riise Hedenstad played the whole match on the left back to great acclaim, with the pundits stating that Hedenstad would soon replace Riise as Norway's regular starting left-back.

== Personal life ==
In January 2009, after his girlfriend Charlotte received news that she was dying of cancer and only had a few months left to live, Hedenstad took a break from professional football. Only 17 at the time, he later described those last few months with her as "fantastic", because they were able to spend them together. In May 2012, Hedenstad experienced another tragic death, when his teammate at Stabæk, Tor Marius Gromstad, died at the age of 22 from an accidental fall at a construction site.

== Career statistics ==
=== Club ===
As of match played 13 July 2025

Appearances and goals by club, season and competition
Club	Season	League			National Cup		Europe		Other		Total	
Club	Season	Division	Apps	Goals	Apps	Goals	Apps	Goals	Apps	Goals	Apps	Goals
Stabæk	2008	Tippeligaen	3	0	1	0	–		–		4	0
Stabæk	2009	Tippeligaen	22	1	5	0	6	0	–		33	1
Stabæk	2010	Tippeligaen	27	1	2	0	2	0	–		31	1
Stabæk	2011	Tippeligaen	28	2	2	0	–		–		30	2
Stabæk	2012	Tippeligaen	14	2	3	0	2	0	–		19	2
Stabæk	Total		94	6	13	0	10	0	0	0	117	6
SC Freiburg	2012–13	Bundesliga	16	0	4	0	–		–		20	0
SC Freiburg	2013–14	Bundesliga	0	0	0	0	1	0	–		1	0
SC Freiburg	2015–16	2. Bundesliga	7	0	1	0	–		–		8	0
SC Freiburg	Total		23	0	5	0	1	0	0	0	29	0
Eintracht Braunschweig (loan)	2014–15	2. Bundesliga	28	1	2	0	–		–		30	1
FC St. Pauli	2016–17	2. Bundesliga	15	0	1	1	–		–		16	1
Rosenborg	2017	Eliteserien	27	2	0	0	10	1	1	0	38	3
Rosenborg	2018	Eliteserien	27	0	4	0	12	0	–		43	0
Rosenborg	2019	Eliteserien	27	2	4	0	13	0	–		44	2
Rosenborg	2020	Eliteserien	19	1	0	0	4	0	–		23	1
Rosenborg	Total		100	5	8	0	39	1	1	0	148	6
Fatih Karagümrük	2020–21	Süper Lig	18	1	0	0	–		–		18	1
Fatih Karagümrük	2021–22	Süper Lig	14	0	0	0	–		–		14	0
Fatih Karagümrük	Total		32	1	0	0	0	0	0	0	32	1
Vålerenga	2022	Eliteserien	27	2	3	0	–		–		30	2
Vålerenga	2023	Eliteserien	12	0	3	0	–		–		15	0
Vålerenga	2024	OBOS-ligaen	28	2	3	2	–		–		31	4
Vålerenga	2025	Eliteserien	6	0	1	0	–		–		7	0
Vålerenga	Total		73	4	10	0	0	0	0	0	83	6
Career total			365	17	39	3	50	1	1	0	455	21

== Honours ==
Stabæk

- Norwegian League: 2008

Rosenborg

- Norwegian League: 2017, 2018
- Norwegian Football Cup: 2018
