= Notodden Stadion =

Football stadium in Notodden, Eastern Norway

Coordinates: 59°33′51″N 9°15′35″E

- Interactive map of Notodden Stadion
- Full name: Notodden Stadion
- Location: Notodden, Norway
- Owner: Notodden FK
- Capacity: 3000, 716 Seated
- Field size: cvt

Tenant
- Notodden FK (–2008)

Notodden Stadion is the former homepitch for the Norwegian football team Notodden FK.
