= Andreas Aalbu =

Norwegian footballer (born 1990)

Personal information
- Date of birth: 26 March 1990 (age 36)
- Place of birth: Bærum, Norway
- Height: 1.91 m (6 ft 3 in)
- Position: Midfielder

Team information
- Current team: Vålerenga (marketing director)

Youth career
- Bærum

Senior career*
Years	Team	Apps	(Gls)
2009–2012	Bærum		
2013	Kristiansund	26	(0)
2014–2015	Bærum	47	(14)
2015–2016	Fredrikstad	26	(3)
2016	→ Varberg (loan)	10	(0)
2017–2018	Ull/Kisa	35	(8)
2018	Fredrikstad	11	(3)
2019	Høvik		

Managerial career
- 2019–2020: Ull/Kisa (marketing director)
- 2020–2022: Ull/Kisa (managing director)
- 2023: Stabæk (marketing director)
- 2023–: Vålerenga (marketing director)
- * Club domestic league appearances and goals

Andreas Aalbu (born 26 March 1990) is a Norwegian footballer who played as a midfielder. He spent most of his playing career in the Norwegian First Division from 2012 to 2018, also becoming known for staff roles after his active career.

== Personal life ==
He is the son of Jan-Erik Aalbu and Ellen Scheel, both footballers, though only his mother represented Norway on international level.

The family resided in the United States for two years when he was little. As a child and teenager he also participated in ski jumping, representing the club Lommedalens IL. He jumped 125 metres, but retired from ski jumping at the age of 14. Through his adolescence, it turned out that he grew too tall to be a ski jumper anyway.

== Career ==
Andreas Aalbu made the step from Bærum SK's youth team to its senior team, eventually winning promotion from the 2011 2. divisjon. Of Aalbu's 79 league and playoff games for Bærum in the First Division, 78 were in the starting eleven. He also spent one year (2013) in Kristiansund BK. He did not score a single goal in Kristiansund, but upon returning to Bærum, he scored three goals and made one assist in the opening match of the 2014 1. divisjon.

The 2014 season ended with Bærum reaching an all-time high, the 2014 Eliteserien promotion/relegation play-offs. In the summer window of 2015, however, Aalbu joined Fredrikstad FK, a larger club, but one that struggled in the table. On leaving Bærum who sunk into in a similar situation, Aalbu stated that the loss of Bærum's former manager and several players meant that Bærum had lost "some of its soul". Fredrikstad also had much larger fan crowds, and he became fully professional as a footballer. He made his debut against Strømmen in August 2015, scoring once, followed by his home debut in late August, scoring again. Fredrikstad barely survived relegation in the closing minutes of the 2015 1. divisjon, after a goal from Aalbu secured one point for Fredrikstad, as well as other results being favourable.

In 2016 he was loaned to Varbergs BoIS of the Superettan. Ljungskile SK was also rumoured to be interested. He then surfaced in Ull/Kisa before the start of the 2017 season. He made his debut in a La Manga friendly and scored the only goal of the match against Florø. In 2018, he went back to the Second Division for the first time since 2011, and also to another former club of his, when signing for promotion chasers Fredrikstad FK.

== Post-playing career ==
Aalbu studied sport management at Molde University College and the Norwegian School of Sport Sciences. He got his first job within sports shortly after ending his playing career in late 2018, when Ull/Kisa hired him as director of marketing and sponsorates.

In January 2020, Aalbu was announced as Ull/Kisa's new managing director. He took over for Cato Strømberg, a man credited with transforming Ull/Kisa to an elite club competing in the second highest league. He sometimes employed an antagonistic style, stating on social media that "he would not set foot" on the grounds of his former club Bærum SK, following a disagreement over COVID-19 rules. In the early summer of 2021, Aalbu experienced that Ull/Kisa hired a new manager, Sindre Tjelmeland, who resigned only five matches into the season to take over a larger club. In reality, Aalbu and Tjelmeland maintained an amicable personal relation. The season ended in relegation for Ull/Kisa.

In September 2022 he joined Bærum SK's main rival, Stabæk Fotball, as their new marketing director. In Budstikka, Aalbu vowed not to change jobs in the foreseeable future. The question was posed because his father had acquired a reputation for jumping between a considerable number of executive jobs. After one year, in September 2023 it was announced that Andreas Aalbu had been persuaded to take over as marketing director of Vålerenga Fotball, starting in 2024. He was allowed to leave Stabæk before 2023 ended; a season that saw both Stabæk and Vålerenga being relegated from the 2023 Eliteserien.

He criticized Viaplay's decision to air the Saudi Premier League.
