= Siemann =

Siemann is a surname. Notable people with the surname include:

- Brian Siemann (born 1989), American Paralympic wheelchair racer
- Evan Siemann, American professor
- Leander Siemann (born 1995), German footballer
- Pipi-Liis Siemann (born 1975), Estonian politician
