= 2014–15 Arsenal F.C. season =

English football club season

Arsenal
2014–15 season
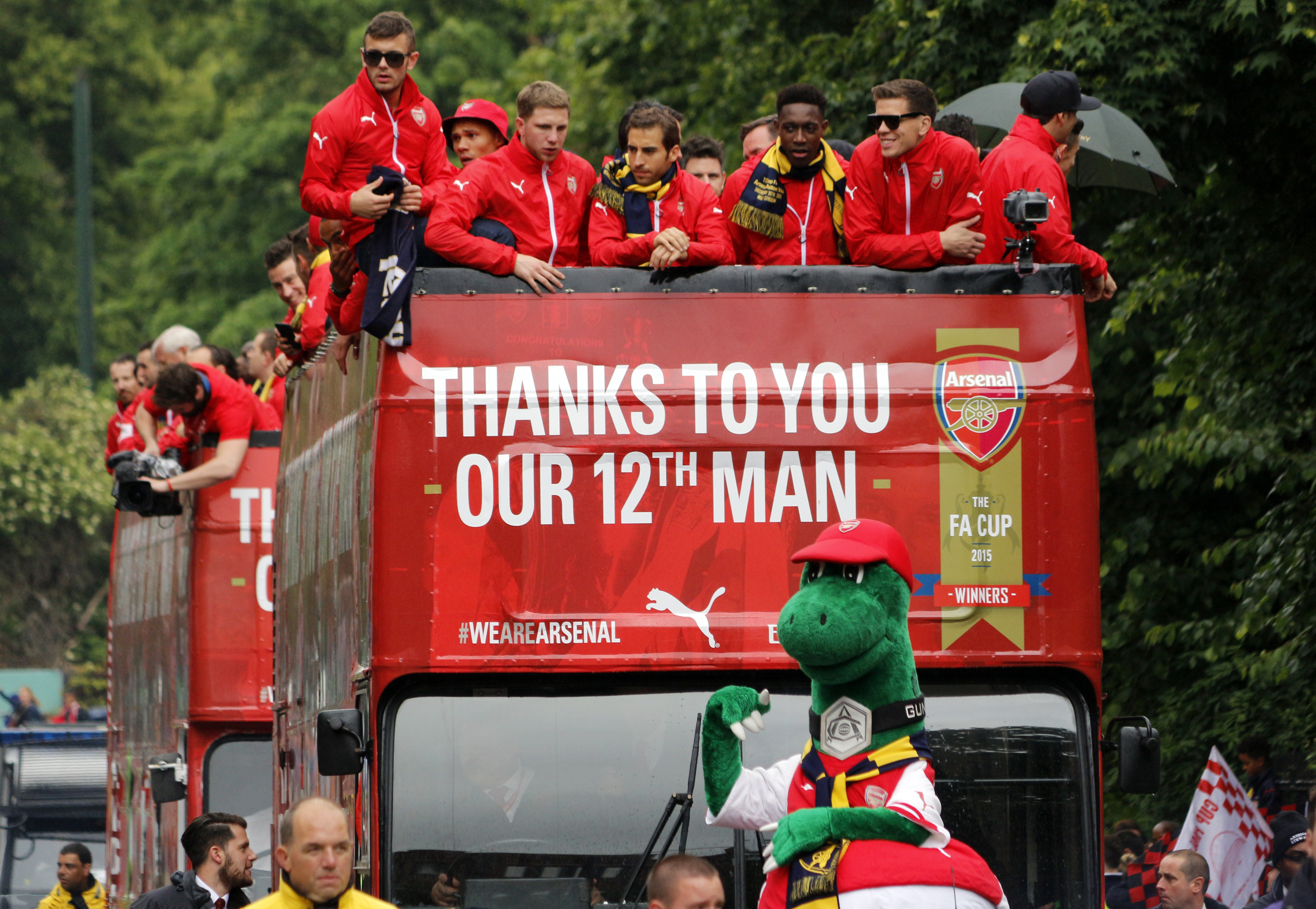
- Arsenal's victory parade following their 12th FA Cup title
- Chairman: Sir Chips Keswick
- Manager: Arsène Wenger
- Stadium: Emirates Stadium
- Premier League: 3rd
- FA Cup: Winners
- League Cup: Third round
- FA Community Shield: Winners
- UEFA Champions League: Round of 16
- Top goalscorer: League: Alexis Sánchez (16); All: Alexis Sánchez (25)
- Highest home attendance: 60,081 vs. Liverpool (4 April 2015, Premier League)
- Lowest home attendance: 59,439 vs. Hull City (4 January 2015, FA Cup)
- Average home league attendance: 59,992
- Biggest win: 5–0 vs. Aston Villa (H) (1 February 2015, Premier League)
- Biggest defeat: Defeated by two goals against four different opponents (Note: Biggest defeats: 2–0 vs. Chelsea (A) (5 October 2014, Premier League) 2–0 vs. Borussia Dortmund (A) (16 September 2014, UEFA Champions League) 2–0 vs. Southampton (A) (1 January 2015, Premier League) 3–1 vs. Monaco (H) (25 February 2015, UEFA Champions League))
| Home colours | Away colours | Third colours |

The 2014–15 season was Arsenal's 23rd season in the Premier League and 89th consecutive season in the top flight of English football. The club participated in the Premier League, FA Cup, Football League Cup, FA Community Shield and the UEFA Champions League. Arsenal finished third in the Premier League and won both the FA Community Shield and the FA Cup.

Arsène Wenger, club manager since 1996, signed several players in the preseason, including Chilean winger Alexis Sánchez from Barcelona, who would be the team's top scorer and win Arsenal Player of the Season. Wenger led the "Gunners" through a turbulent start with player injuries and poor form placing the side as low as eighth in December. In the second half of the season, Arsenal found good form, challenging for the Premier League title with an eight game winning streak in the latter stages. However, following a nil-all draw in April with eventual champions Chelsea, Arsenal all but lost their chances at winning the title. Arsenal repeated their 2014 victory, winning the 2015 FA Cup final 4–0 against Aston Villa; thus becoming the most successful team outright in the FA Cup, with a total of 12 titles.

In the UEFA Champions League, Arsenal finished second in their group behind Borussia Dortmund on goal difference. Arsenal was eliminated on away goals over two legs against the Ligue 1 side Monaco in the round of 16. It was the fifth consecutive season Arsenal left the competition in the round of 16 phase.

== Background ==
The 2014–15 season marked Arsenal's 23rd consecutive year in the Premier League, their 111th season in the English top flight, and their 89th consecutive season in the tier. This season the club extended the record for the longest continuous run in the top flight which began with their promotion in the 1919–20 season. During the previous season, Arsenal finished fourth in the Premier League behind Manchester City, Chelsea and Liverpool; the club won the FA Cup after defeating Hull City in the final. Additionally, they finished in the round of 16 of the UEFA Champions League and the fourth round of the Football League Cup. Ahead of the new season, the club announced that playing kits would be manufactured by German sportswear company Puma, after a 20-year association with Nike came to an end. The club also announced an increase in their ticket prices of 3% in line with inflation. Long term manager Arsène Wenger, who joined the club in 1996, extended his contract with the club through May 2017. Arsenal chairman Chips Keswick commentated on how Wenger "has established Arsenal for its exciting playing style around the world", and that he has "no doubt [Arsenal] have an exciting future ahead of [them] with him leading the team".

=== Summer transfer window ===
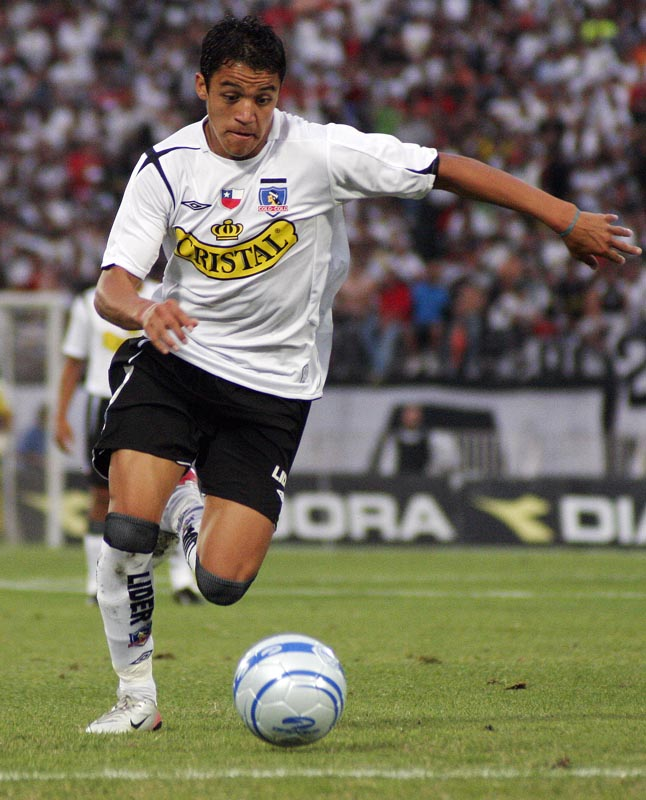
Sánchez (pictured with Colo-Colo) joined for a £35 million transfer fee from Barcelona

On 26 June 2014, Arsenal announced that 11 players would depart the club on 30 June at the conclusion of their contracts. The list included loanees Kim Källström and Emiliano Viviano, along with players who signed pre-contract agreements: Łukasz Fabiański (Swansea City), Bacary Sagna (Manchester City), Zak Ansah (Charlton Athletic), Zachari Fagan (Welling United), and Chuks Aneke (Zulte Waregem). The list of players also included Leander Siemann, Nicklas Bendtner, Park Chu-young and Daniel Boateng.

The club transferred a selection of players ahead of the season for undisclosed fees; these players included German midfielder Thomas Eisfeld, Swiss international defender Johan Djourou, and Spanish defender Ignasi Miquel. The club received a £15 million fee from Barcelona for the transfer of Belgian defender Thomas Vermaelen, who left after making 110 Premier League appearances for Arsenal. It was also reported that Arsenal received benefits for selling a selection of contractual rights including clauses with Carlos Vela at Real Sociedad, and Cesc Fàbregas at Chelsea.

The club announced the much-anticipated transfer of Chilean forward Alexis Sánchez on 10 July from Barcelona, who joined the club on a long-term contract for a reported transfer fee of £35 million. A week later, French defender Mathieu Debuchy joined the club for an undisclosed fee; he was seen as a direct replacement for the departed Sagna. On 27 July, Colombian goalkeeper David Ospina signed for Arsenal from French club Nice for a reported transfer fee of £3 million, replacing former goalkeeper Fabiański, who had ended his contract.

The club announced the signing of English defender Calum Chambers from Southampton on 28 July; his transfer fee was reported to cost the club £16 million. Wenger admitted that Chambers' transfer fee was a gamble for a young player, but he had faith in the player to demonstrate his versatility whilst at the club. Arsenal's final first-team summer signing was Danny Welbeck, his transfer from Manchester United was reported to have cost Arsenal £16 million.

During the summer transfer window, a variety of players left the club on loan, this included first-team players such as Carl Jenkinson to West Ham United, and Francis Coquelin to Charlton Athletic.

== Pre-season ==
In preparation for their season, Arsenal played Conference South side Boreham Wood at their home stadium Meadow Park. The "Gunners" defeated Boreham Wood 2–0 with players who did not attend the 2014 FIFA World Cup; the team won comfortably with goals from academy players Kristoffer Olsson and Benik Afobe. Arsenal then travelled to Harrison, United States to play the New York Red Bulls. Former Arsenal player Thierry Henry played against his former club as his side defeated Arsenal 1–0, and Bradley Wright-Phillips, the son of former Arsenal player Ian Wright, scored the only goal against a heavily rotated Arsenal side. In August, Arsenal hosted the 2014 Emirates Cup which was an invitational friendly tournament at the Emirates Stadium with Valencia, Benfica and Monaco participating. Arsenal played Benfica first, defeating the Portuguese side 5–1 with four goals from Yaya Sanogo and a volleyed goal from academy player Joel Campbell. Arsenal then played Monaco, losing 1–0 due to a Radamel Falcao goal. Valencia won the Emirates Cup tournament and Arsenal placed second.

Match details

| 19 July 2014 Friendly | Boreham Wood (England) | 0–2 | (England) Arsenal | Borehamwood |
| 15:00 BST | | Report | Olsson 68'; Afobe 86' (pen.) | Stadium: Meadow Park; Attendance: NA; Referee: NA |

| 26 July 2014 New York Cup | New York Red Bulls (United States) | 1–0 | (England) Arsenal | Harrison, United States |
| 17:00 EDT; 22:00 BST | Wright-Phillips 33'; Cahill (yellow card) 45+1'; Kimura (yellow card) 90' | Report | | Stadium: Red Bull Arena; Attendance: 25,219; Referee: Javier Santos (Puerto Rico) |

| 2 August 2014 Emirates Cup | Arsenal (England) | 5–1 | (Portugal) Benfica | Holloway |
| 16:20 BST | Monreal (yellow card) 20'; Sanogo 26', 44', 45+1', 49'; Campbell 40' | Report | Gaitán 62'; Benito (yellow card) 83' | Stadium: Emirates Stadium; Attendance: NA; Referee: Lee Mason (England) |

| 3 August 2014 Emirates Cup | Arsenal (England) | 0–1 | (France) Monaco | Holloway |
| 16:20 BST | Wilshere (yellow card) 36'; Miquel (yellow card) 65'; Flamini (yellow card) 90' | Report | Falcao 37'; Subašić (yellow card) 81' | Stadium: Emirates Stadium; Attendance: 50,000; Referee: Martin Atkinson (England) |

== FA Community Shield ==
Arsenal qualified for the FA Community Shield on virtue of winning the FA Cup during the preceding season; they faced Manchester City, the Premier League champions. In Arsenal's first competitive game of the season, the club defeated Manchester City 3–0 with goals from Santi Cazorla, Aaron Ramsey and Giroud. Wenger was happy with Arsenal's bright start to the season pointing out after the game that his team exhibited a "complete performance"; he also acknowledged the team's flaws, saying that during the second half "we lost a bit more of the ball than in the first half and our movements were less fluent".

Match details

| 10 August 2014 Final | Arsenal | 3–0 | Manchester City | Wembley Park |
| 15:00 BST | Cazorla 21'; Ramsey 43'; Giroud 62' | Report | Fernando (yellow card) 51' | Stadium: Wembley Stadium; Attendance: 71,523; Referee: Michael Oliver |

== Premier League ==
=== August–October ===
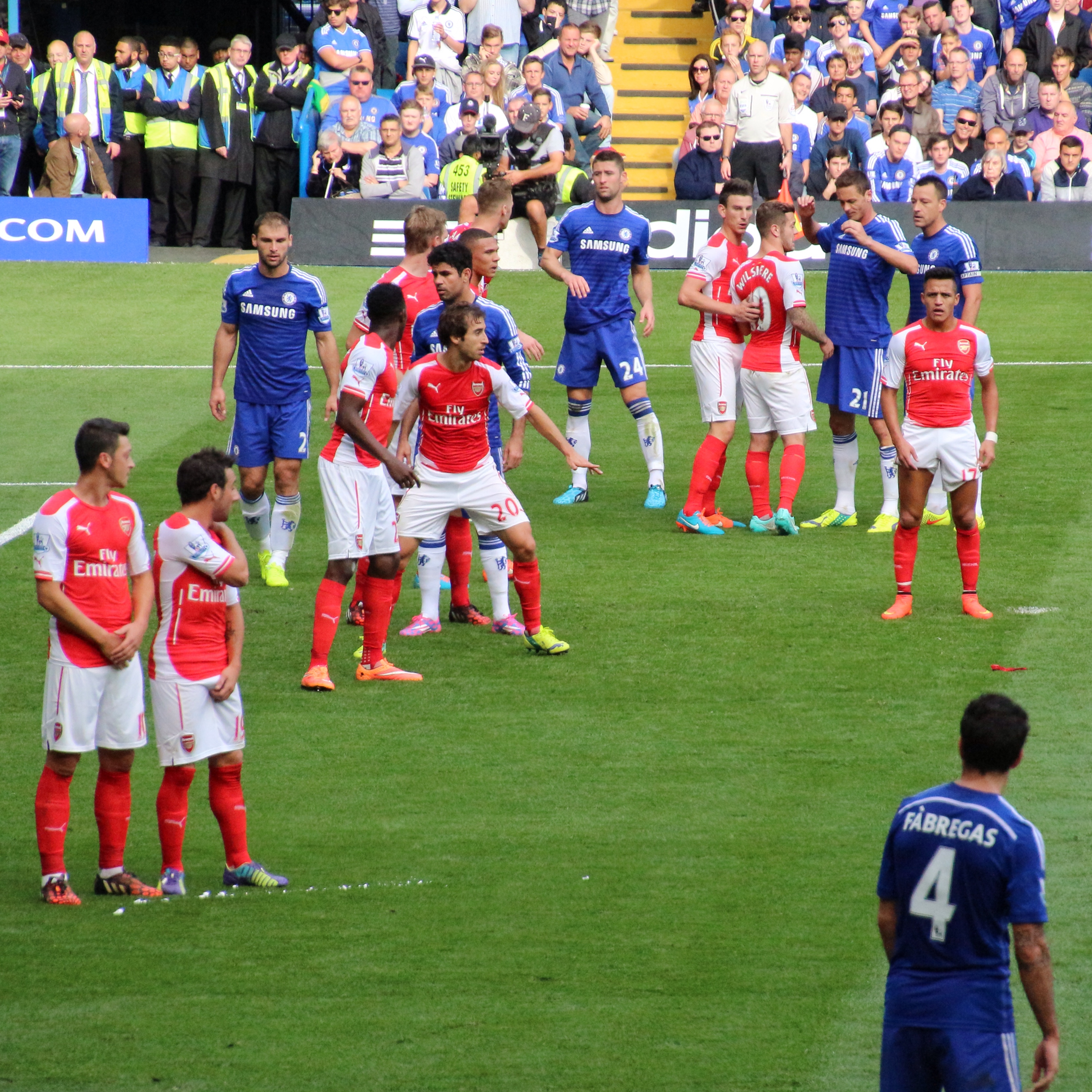
Arsenal defending a free-kick against Chelsea at Stamford Bridge on 5 October

Arsenal began their Premier League season at the Emirates Stadium against Crystal Palace on 16 August 2014. The visitors took the lead through Brede Hangeland's header from a corner in the first half, but Arsenal replied with a Laurent Koscielny equaliser and a late stoppage time winner from Ramsey. Arsenal defeated Crystal Palace, who had a player sent off, and gave the club a winning start to their league campaign. The club then went on a three-game winless run with draws against Everton at Goodison Park, Leicester City at the King Power Stadium, and after the international break, Manchester City at the Emirates Stadium. New signing Sánchez scored his first league goal for the club against Leicester City, but the club also lost Giroud and Debuchy to injury during their winless run. Arsenal's misfortune was momentarily suspended after a comprehensive 3–0 away win over Aston Villa, with a first Arsenal league goal for new signing Welbeck, a calm Mesut Özil finish and an own goal from Villa defender Aly Cissokho.

On 27 September, Arsenal faced Tottenham Hotspur in the North London derby at the Emirates Stadium. The match ended in a 1–1 draw; Spurs' Nacer Chadli gave his side the lead early in the second half, but Arsenal responded with Alex Oxlade-Chamberlain's effort against a wrong-footed Tottenham defence with 15 minutes left in the match. After the game, Wenger voiced his frustration at Arsenal's set-piece routines saying that the players did not create enough from these opportunities; Wenger also mentioned that Ramsey and club captain Mikel Arteta sustained muscular injuries, and they would be temporarily unavailable. Arsenal's misfortune continued when they lost 2–0 against rivals Chelsea at Stamford Bridge, with the "Blue's" Eden Hazard and Diego Costa on the scoresheet. The loss meant the Wenger had not defeated Chelsea manager José Mourinho after 12 different attempts. Arsenal also lost playmaker Özil to injury during the match and could not play for three months.

With the hope of finding good form, the club played Steve Bruce's Hull City after the international break, where the "Gunners" drew 2–2 with Sánchez and Welbeck netting the goals for Arsenal at the Emirates Stadium. Wenger, frustrated with the result, criticised his players for conceding "too many goals" as a result of a lack of concentration. Arsenal won their final match in October when they defeated Sunderland at the Stadium of Light, capitalising off player mistakes, and the club finished the month in fifth place on the Premier League table.

=== November–February ===
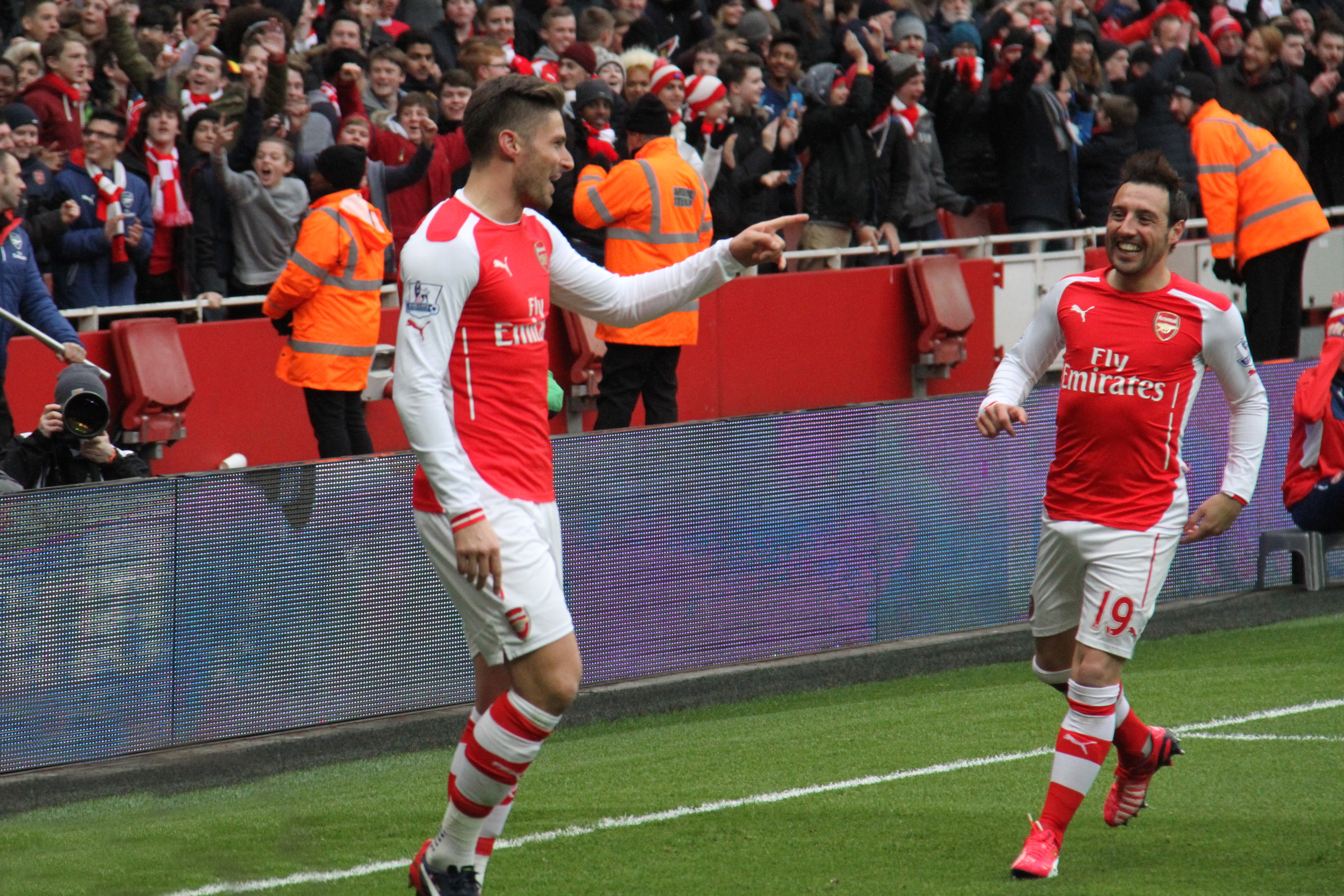
Giroud (left) and Carzorla celebrating the former's goal against Aston Villa at the Emirates Stadium

A Sánchez brace (two goals) and a first senior goal from Chambers helped Arsenal dispatch Sean Dyche's Burnley 3–0 at home on 1 November. The Chilean took his club goal tally to ten goals during the match, Wenger praised Sánchez after the match by comparing the player to Uruguayan forward Luis Suárez in his post-match interview. Travelling to Wales, Arsenal then lost to Swansea City 2–1, after having a one goal lead courtesy of a tidy Sánchez finish. The club's first home defeat came against Manchester United; the 2–1 loss was Arsenal's first and only consecutive defeat in the Premier League during the season. A Kieran Gibbs own goal and a tidy Wayne Rooney finish meant that Giroud's goal in added time was just a consolation; after the match, Wenger called his side "defensibly naive" and also thought the game was "one way traffic" in United's favour. The defeat was a dent in Arsenal's title hopes, given that Jack Wilshere was also injured after a heavy Paddy McNair challenge. The club ended their month positively with a tight 1–0 away win against West Bromwich Albion, courtesy of a Welbeck header.

On 3 December, Arsenal defeated Southampton 1–0, and three days later lost 3–2 away to Stoke City. During the game against Stoke, new signing Chambers was sent off after receiving a second yellow card and Wenger was again critical of his side, calling Arsenal "soft". With Giroud and Carzorla scoring braces, Arsenal later defeated Newcastle United 4–1 at the Emirates Stadium to recover from their defeat to Stoke City. Arsenal then travelled to Anfield to play a struggling Liverpool side who were placed mid-table; the "Gunners" drew 2–2 with Liverpool with Philippe Coutinho and Martin Škrtel scoring the goals for the "Reds". On Boxing Day, Arsenal defeated Queens Park Rangers 2–1, and later dispatched West Ham United on 28 December to end 2014 with a victory. On 5 January 2015, Arsenal sent Lukas Podolski on loan to Inter Milan for the remainder of the season; Podolski had not started a Premier League game for Arsenal during the season, and had only made four appearances in Arsenal's UEFA Champions League group stage campaign. Arsenal also loaned Yaya Sanogo to Crystal Palace for the remainder of the season, the Frenchman had only made five appearances for Arsenal during the season. To reinforce the squad, the club signed Gabriel Paulista from La Liga side Villarreal for £11.2 million.

In the three games Arsenal played in January, they lost 2–0 to Southampton away, defeated Stoke City 3–0 at the Emirates Stadium, and dispatched Manchester City 2–0 at the City of Manchester Stadium. In the game against Stoke, Sánchez was involved in all three goals, assisting Koscielny's header and scoring the other two; the match also saw Özil appear as a substitute, having returned from injury. Wenger said that Arsenal's performance in their 2–0 win over Manchester City was "exceptional". Cazorla scored the opening goal from a penalty and later set up Giroud's goal from a free-kick; it was Arsenal's first win at Manchester City since October 2010. In February, Arsenal defeated Aston Villa 5–0 at the Emirates Stadium in what would be Arsenal's largest winning margin during the season. The club's good form was interrupted when they lost 2–1 to Tottenham Hotspur at White Hart Lane with Harry Kane scoring both goals for Spurs. In Arsenal's final two matches during the month, they defeated Leicester City at the Emirates Stadium, and dispatched Crystal Palace 2–1 at Selhurst Park.

=== March–May ===
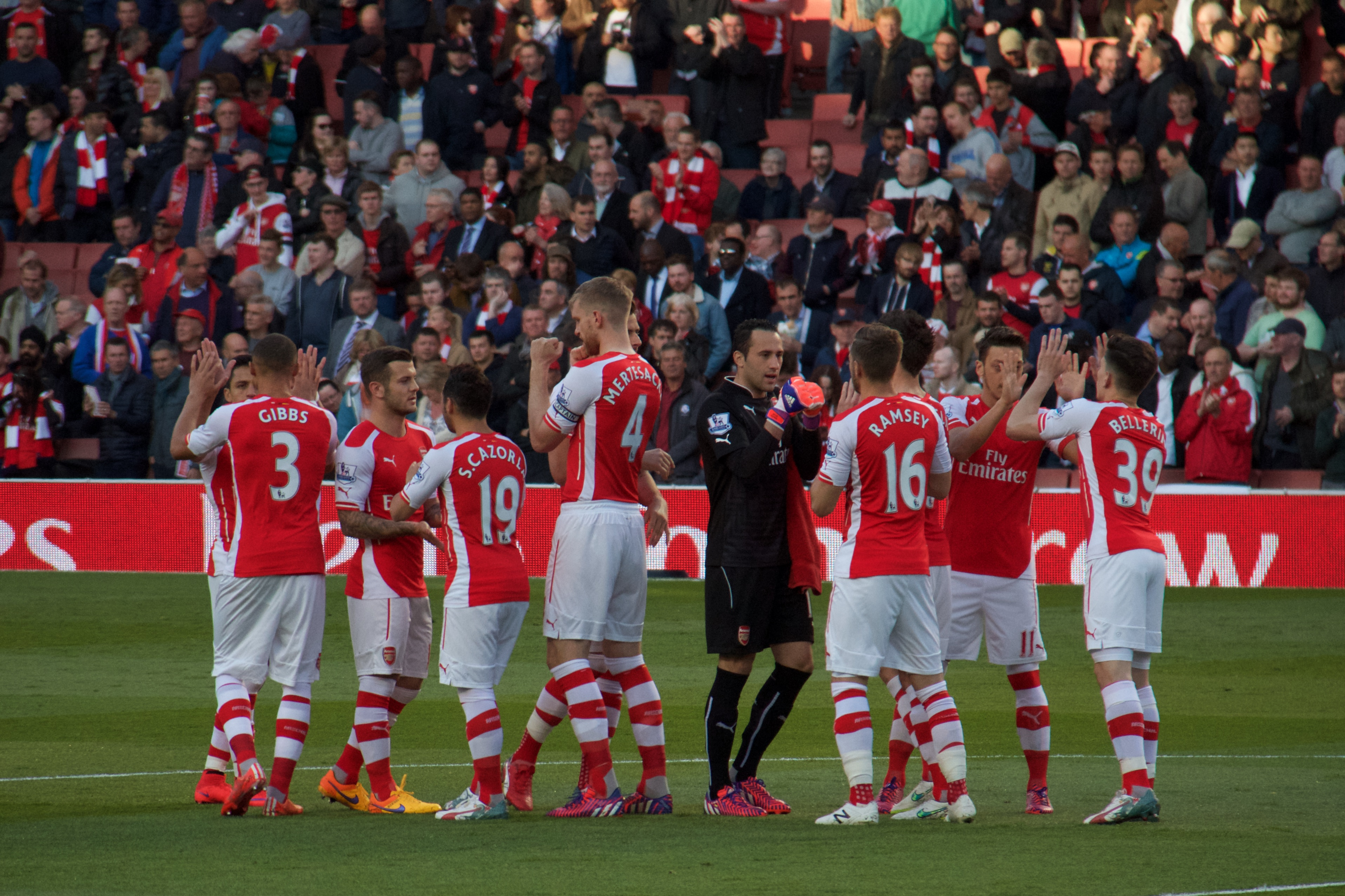
Arsenal players before their match against Sunderland at the Emirates Stadium

On 1 March, Arsenal played Everton with Giroud and Tomáš Rosický scoring the goals for the "Gunners" as they won 2–0 at home. January signing Gabriel Paulista also made his first Premier League start during the match. Three days later, Arsenal travelled to Loftus Road to defeat Queens Park Rangers 2–1, with Sánchez ending a run of seven games without scoring. The "Gunners" finished March with a 3–0 home win against West Ham United, and a 2–1 win over Newcastle United; with their victory in Tyneside, Arsenal had won their last six consecutive league games and sat third on the league table, one point behind second-placed Manchester City. Wenger was later voted Premier League Manager of the Month for Arsenal's strong form in March, and Giroud was voted Premier League Player of the Month after he scored five goals in Arsenal's four league matches in the month.

On 4 April, Arsenal convincingly defeated Liverpool 4–1 at home, goals from Héctor Bellerín, Özil, Sánchez and Giroud sealed the victory for the "Gunners"; the win saw Arsenal jump to second place on the league table, but were still seven points behind Chelsea in first place – who had a game in hand. After a 1–0 away win over Burnley, Arsenal were set to play a much-anticipated game against Chelsea on 26 April at home. The match ended in a 0–0 draw and thus ended Arsenal's winning run of eight league games; Chelsea later won the Premier League title after their 1–0 win over Crystal Palace on 3 May.

Having lost out on the league title, Arsenal looked to secure qualification for the Champions League in their final five league matches. With a win over Hull City, a loss against Swansea City, and two draws against Manchester United and Sunderland, a win in their final game against West Bromwich Albion would secure Arsenal third place and Champions League football for the following season. The "Gunners" ended their season positively after they won 4–1 at home with a Walcott hat-trick and a 20-yard finish by Wilshere.

Match details

| 16 August 2014 1 | Arsenal | 2–1 | Crystal Palace | Holloway |
| 17:30 BST | Chambers (yellow card) 44'; Koscielny 45+1'; Cazorla (yellow card) 60'; Ramsey 90+1' | Report | Hangeland 35'; Puncheon (yellow card) 48' (yellow-red card) 89'; Chamakh (yellow card) 68'; Kelly (yellow card) 77' | Stadium: Emirates Stadium; Attendance: 59,962; Referee: Jonathan Moss |

| 23 August 2014 2 | Everton | 2–2 | Arsenal | Walton |
| 17:30 BST | Coleman 19'; Baines (yellow card) 29'; Naismith 45' | Report | Mertesacker (yellow card) 43'; Wilshere (yellow card) 54'; Chambers (yellow card) 57'; Flamini (yellow card) 77'; Ramsey 83'; Giroud 90' | Stadium: Goodison Park; Attendance: 39,490; Referee: Kevin Friend |

| 31 August 2014 3 | Leicester City | 1–1 | Arsenal | Leicester |
| 16:00 BST | Ulloa 23'; Albrighton (yellow card) 84'; Hammond (yellow card) 85'; Moore (yellow card) 90' | Report | Sánchez 20'; Szczęsny (yellow card) 90' | Stadium: King Power Stadium; Attendance: 31,535; Referee: Anthony Taylor |

| 13 September 2014 4 | Arsenal | 2–2 | Manchester City | Holloway |
| 12:45 BST | Flamini (yellow card) 58'; Monreal (yellow card) 62'; Wilshere 64'; Sánchez 74', (yellow card) 75' | Report | Lampard (yellow card) 22'; Zabaleta (yellow card) 24'; Agüero 28', (yellow card) 64'; Fernandinho (yellow card) 50'; Demichelis 84' | Stadium: Emirates Stadium; Attendance: 60,003; Referee: Mark Clattenburg |

| 20 September 2014 5 | Aston Villa | 0–3 | Arsenal | Aston |
| 15:00 BST | Clark (yellow card) 83' | Report | Chambers (yellow card) 22'; Özil 33'; Welbeck 34'; Cissokho 35' (o.g.); Ramsey (yellow card) 56'; Wilshere (yellow card) 84' | Stadium: Villa Park; Attendance: 40,013; Referee: Mike Jones |

| 27 September 2014 6 | Arsenal | 1–1 | Tottenham Hotspur | Holloway |
| 17:30 BST | Oxlade-Chamberlain (yellow card) 12', (goal) 74'; Wilshere (yellow card) 22'; Chambers (yellow card) 86' | Report | Lamela (yellow card) 27'; Chadli 56', (yellow card) 57'; Adebayor (yellow card) 69'; Lennon (yellow card) 69'; Mason (yellow card) 72'; Rose (yellow card) 83' | Stadium: Emirates Stadium; Attendance: 59,900; Referee: Michael Oliver |

| 5 October 2014 7 | Chelsea | 2–0 | Arsenal | Fulham |
| 14:05 BST | Cahill (yellow card) 20'; Hazard 27' (pen.); Ivanović (yellow card) 53'; Schürrle (yellow card) 66'; Costa 78'; Oscar (yellow card) 86' | Report | Chambers (yellow card) 22'; Koscielny (yellow card) 27'; Welbeck (yellow card) 90+1' | Stadium: Stamford Bridge; Attendance: 41,607; Referee: Martin Atkinson |

| 18 October 2014 8 | Arsenal | 2–2 | Hull City | Holloway |
| 15:00 BST | Sánchez 13'; Wilshere (yellow card) 69'; Cazorla (yellow card) 80'; Welbeck 90+1' | Report | Diamé 17'; Chester (yellow card) 44'; Hernández 46'; Huddlestone (yellow card) 66' | Stadium: Emirates Stadium; Attendance: 60,004; Referee: Roger East |

| 25 October 2014 9 | Sunderland | 0–2 | Arsenal | Sunderland |
| 15:00 BST | Larsson (yellow card) 38'; Cattermole (yellow card) 63'; Wickham (yellow card) 68' | Report | Gibbs (yellow card) 24'; Sánchez 30', 90+3'; Welbeck (yellow card) 50'; Arteta (yellow card) 55' | Stadium: Stadium of Light; Attendance: 44,449; Referee: Kevin Friend |

| 1 November 2014 10 | Arsenal | 3–0 | Burnley | Holloway |
| 15:00 GMT | Sánchez 70', 90'; Chambers 72' | Report | Boyd (yellow card) 16' | Stadium: Emirates Stadium; Attendance: 60,012; Referee: Craig Pawson |

| 9 November 2014 11 | Swansea City | 2–1 | Arsenal | Swansea, Wales |
| 16:00 GMT | Taylor (yellow card) 37'; Ki Sung-yueng (yellow card) 41'; Williams (yellow card) 50'; Carroll (yellow card) 63'; Sigurðsson 75'; Gomis 78'; Barrow (yellow card) 90' | Report | Ramsey (yellow card) 45+1'; Mertesacker (yellow card) 55'; Chambers (yellow card) 62'; Sánchez 63', (yellow card) 86'; Gibbs (yellow card) 74' | Stadium: Liberty Stadium; Attendance: 20,812; Referee: Phil Dowd |

| 22 November 2014 12 | Arsenal | 1–2 | Manchester United | Holloway |
| 17:30 GMT | Cazorla (yellow card) 65'; Giroud 90+5', (yellow card) 90+8' | Report | Gibbs 56' (o.g.); Rooney 85'; Wilson (yellow card) 90+7' | Stadium: Emirates Stadium; Attendance: 60,074; Referee: Mike Dean |

| 29 November 2014 13 | West Bromwich Albion | 0–1 | Arsenal | West Bromwich |
| 12:45 GMT | Dorrans (yellow card) 53'; Gamboa (yellow card) 84' | Report | Welbeck 60'; Oxlade-Chamberlain (yellow card) 90+3' | Stadium: The Hawthorns; Attendance: 24,228; Referee: Chris Foy |

| 3 December 2014 14 | Arsenal | 1–0 | Southampton | Holloway |
| 19:45 GMT | Sánchez 89' | Report | Alderweireld (yellow card) 43'; Wanyama (yellow card) 76' | Stadium: Emirates Stadium; Attendance: 60,025; Referee: Andre Marriner |

| 6 December 2014 15 | Stoke City | 3–2 | Arsenal | Stoke-on-Trent |
| 15:00 GMT | Crouch 1', (yellow card) 46'; Krkić 35'; Muniesa (yellow card) 44'; Walters 45'; Adam (yellow card) 84' | Report | Chambers (yellow card) 61' (yellow-red card) 78'; Cazorla 68' (pen.); Ramsey 70'; Gibbs (yellow card) 71'; Oxlade-Chamberlain (yellow card) 72' | Stadium: Britannia Stadium; Attendance: 27,367; Referee: Anthony Taylor |

| 13 December 2014 16 | Arsenal | 4–1 | Newcastle United | Holloway |
| 17:30 GMT | Giroud 15', 58'; Bellerín (yellow card) 37'; Cazorla 54', 88' (pen.); Oxlade-Chamberlain (yellow card) 57' | Report | Tioté (yellow card) 59'; Pérez 63'; Janmaat (yellow card) 82' | Stadium: Emirates Stadium; Attendance: 59,949; Referee: Lee Mason |

| 21 December 2014 17 | Liverpool | 2–2 | Arsenal | Liverpool |
| 16:00 GMT | Coutinho 45'; Borini (yellow card) 90' (yellow-red card) 90+2'; Škrtel 90+7' | Report | Flamini (yellow card) 14'; Debuchy 45+2', (yellow card) 47'; Giroud 64'; Cazorla (yellow card) 90+3' | Stadium: Anfield; Attendance: 44,703; Referee: Michael Oliver |

| 26 December 2014 18 | Arsenal | 2–1 | Queens Park Rangers | Holloway |
| 17:30 GMT | Sánchez 37'; Giroud (red card) 53'; Rosický 65'; Coquelin (yellow card) 90+4' | Report | Ferdinand (yellow card) 27'; Mutch (yellow card) 55'; Hoilett (yellow card) 70'; Austin 79' (pen.); Kranjčar (yellow card) 90+3' | Stadium: Emirates Stadium; Attendance: 59,947; Referee: Martin Atkinson |

| 28 December 2014 19 | West Ham United | 1–2 | Arsenal | Upton Park |
| 15:00 GMT | Carroll (yellow card) 36'; Kouyaté 54'; Tomkins (yellow card) 84'; Reid (yellow card) 88' | Report | Cazorla 41' (pen.); Welbeck 44'; Sánchez (yellow card) 48'; Debuchy (yellow card) 80'; Coquelin (yellow card) 90+5' | Stadium: Boleyn Ground; Attendance: 34,977; Referee: Neil Swarbrick |

| 1 January 2015 20 | Southampton | 2–0 | Arsenal | Southampton |
| 15:00 GMT | Wanyama (yellow card) 23'; Mané 34'; Tadić 56'; Gardoș (yellow card) 67' | Report | Coquelin (yellow card) 74' | Stadium: St Mary's Stadium; Attendance: 31,492; Referee: Craig Pawson |

| 11 January 2015 21 | Arsenal | 3–0 | Stoke City | Holloway |
| 13:30 GMT | Koscielny 6'; Sánchez 33', 48' | Report | Wollscheid (yellow card) 51'; Cameron (yellow card) 61'; Crouch (yellow card) 63' | Stadium: Emirates Stadium; Attendance: 59,956; Referee: Jonathan Moss |

| 18 January 2015 22 | Manchester City | 0–2 | Arsenal | Manchester |
| 16:00 GMT | Kompany (yellow card) 41'; Fernandinho (yellow card) 54'; Agüero (yellow card) 86' | Report | Koscielny (yellow card) 3'; Cazorla 24' (pen.); Ramsey (yellow card) 38'; Bellerín (yellow card) 56'; Giroud 67' | Stadium: Etihad Stadium; Attendance: 45,596; Referee: Mike Dean |

| 1 February 2015 23 | Arsenal | 5–0 | Aston Villa | Holloway |
| 13:30 GMT | Giroud 8'; Özil 56'; Walcott 63'; Cazorla 75' (pen.); Bellerín 90+2' | Report | Clark (yellow card) 57'; Gil (yellow card) 68' | Stadium: Emirates Stadium; Attendance: 59,958; Referee: Anthony Taylor |

| 7 February 2015 24 | Tottenham Hotspur | 2–1 | Arsenal | Tottenham |
| 12:45 GMT | Kane (yellow card) 36', (goal) 56', 86'; Mason (yellow card) 79'; Bentaleb (yellow card) 90+2' | Report | Özil 11'; Monreal (yellow card) 43'; Welbeck (yellow card) 45+2'; Koscielny (yellow card) 53'; Giroud (yellow card) 84'; Ramsey (yellow card) 90+4' | Stadium: White Hart Lane; Attendance: 35,659; Referee: Martin Atkinson |

| 10 February 2015 25 | Arsenal | 2–1 | Leicester City | Holloway |
| 19:45 GMT | Koscielny 27'; Walcott 41'; Rosický (yellow card) 67'; Giroud (yellow card) 90+5' | Report | Kramarić 61'; Wasilewski (yellow card) 65'; Simpson (yellow card) 89' | Stadium: Emirates Stadium; Attendance: 60,032; Referee: Mike Jones |

| 21 February 2015 26 | Crystal Palace | 1–2 | Arsenal | Selhurst |
| 15:00 GMT | Mutch (yellow card) 19'; Murray 90+4' | Report | Cazorla 8' (pen.); Coquelin (yellow card) 28'; Giroud 45+1', (yellow card) 56'; Chambers (yellow card) 85' | Stadium: Selhurst Park; Attendance: 24,721; Referee: Mark Clattenburg |

| 1 March 2015 27 | Arsenal | 2–0 | Everton | Holloway |
| 14:05 GMT | Giroud 39', (yellow card) 47'; Koscielny (yellow card) 78'; Rosický 89' | Report | | Stadium: Emirates Stadium; Attendance: 59,925; Referee: Andre Marriner |

| 4 March 2015 28 | Queens Park Rangers | 1–2 | Arsenal | White City |
| 19:45 GMT | Henry (yellow card) 32'; Yun Suk-young (yellow card) 80'; Austin 82' | Report | Bellerín (yellow card) 34'; Giroud 64'; Sánchez 69' | Stadium: Loftus Road; Attendance: 17,977; Referee: Kevin Friend |

| 14 March 2015 29 | Arsenal | 3–0 | West Ham United | Holloway |
| 15:00 GMT | Sánchez (yellow card) 36'; Giroud 45+1'; Ramsey 82'; Flamini 84' | Report | Sakho (yellow card) 78' | Stadium: Emirates Stadium; Attendance: 60,002; Referee: Chris Foy started the match as referee but was replaced by Anthony Taylor after 59 minutes due to Foy suffering a calf injury. |

| 21 March 2015 30 | Newcastle United | 1–2 | Arsenal | Newcastle upon Tyne |
| 15:00 GMT | Sissoko 48' | Report | Giroud 24', 28' | Stadium: St James' Park; Attendance: 50,544; Referee: Mike Jones |

| 4 April 2015 31 | Arsenal | 4–1 | Liverpool | Holloway |
| 12:45 BST | Bellerín 37', (yellow card) 70'; Özil 40'; Sánchez 45'; Giroud 90+1' | Report | Can (yellow card) 49' (yellow-red card) 84'; Henderson 76' (pen.) | Stadium: Emirates Stadium; Attendance: 60,081; Referee: Anthony Taylor |

| 11 April 2015 32 | Burnley | 0–1 | Arsenal | Burnley |
| 17:30 BST | Mee (yellow card) 25'; Duff (yellow card) 26' | Report | Ramsey 12' | Stadium: Turf Moor; Attendance: 20,615; Referee: Mike Dean |

| 26 April 2015 33 | Arsenal | 0–0 | Chelsea | Holloway |
| 16:00 BST | Coquelin (yellow card) 34'; Ramsey (yellow card) 89'; Cazorla (yellow card) 90+3'; Monreal (yellow card) 90+5' | Report | Fàbregas (yellow card) 23'; Willian (yellow card) 68'; Ivanović (yellow card) 72' | Stadium: Emirates Stadium; Attendance: 60,066; Referee: Michael Oliver |

| 4 May 2015 34 | Hull City | 1–3 | Arsenal | Kingston upon Hull |
| 20:00 BST | Livermore (yellow card) 23'; N'Doye (yellow card) 30'; Quinn 57' | Report | Sánchez 28', 45+1'; Ramsey 33' | Stadium: KC Stadium; Attendance: 23,628; Referee: Lee Mason |

| 11 May 2015 35 | Arsenal | 0–1 | Swansea City | Holloway |
| 20:00 BST | | Report | Shelvey (yellow card) 38'; Gomis 86' | Stadium: Emirates Stadium; Attendance: 59,989; Referee: Kevin Friend |

| 17 May 2015 36 | Manchester United | 1–1 | Arsenal | Stretford |
| 16:00 BST | Herrera 30', (yellow card) 90+5' | Report | Blackett 82' (o.g.) | Stadium: Old Trafford; Attendance: 75,323; Referee: Mike Dean |

| 20 May 2015 37 | Arsenal | 0–0 | Sunderland | Holloway |
| 19:45 BST | Ramsey (yellow card) 18' | Report | | Stadium: Emirates Stadium; Attendance: 59,987; Referee: Anthony Taylor |

| 24 May 2015 38 | Arsenal | 4–1 | West Bromwich Albion | Holloway |
| 15:00 BST | Walcott 4', 14', 37'; Wilshere 17'; Bellerín (yellow card) 48' | Report | McAuley 57' | Stadium: Emirates Stadium; Attendance: 59,971; Referee: Robert Madley |

=== League Table ===
| Pos | Team | Pld | W | D | L | GF | GA | GD | Pts | Qualification or relegation |
|---|---|---|---|---|---|---|---|---|---|---|
| 1 | Chelsea (C) | 38 | 26 | 9 | 3 | 73 | 32 | +41 | 87 | Qualification for the Champions League group stage |
| 2 | Manchester City | 38 | 24 | 7 | 7 | 83 | 38 | +45 | 79 | Qualification for the Champions League group stage |
| 3 | Arsenal | 38 | 22 | 9 | 7 | 71 | 36 | +35 | 75 | Qualification for the Champions League group stage |
| 4 | Manchester United | 38 | 20 | 10 | 8 | 62 | 37 | +25 | 70 | Qualification for the Champions League play-off round |
| 5 | Tottenham Hotspur | 38 | 19 | 7 | 12 | 58 | 53 | +5 | 64 | Qualification for the Europa League group stage (Note: Since winners of the 2014–15 FA Cup, Arsenal, and winners of the 2014–15 Football League Cup, Chelsea, qualified for the Champions League based on league position, the spot awarded to the FA Cup winners (Europa League group stage) was passed to the sixth-placed team, Liverpool, and the spot awarded to the League Cup winners (Europa League third qualifying round) was passed to the seventh-placed team, Southampton, since those teams were the first teams in the table not already qualified for any European competition.) |

Source: Barclays Premier League
Rules for classification: 1) Points; 2) Goal difference; 3) Goals scored; 4) Play-offs (only if needed to decide champion, teams for relegation or teams for UEFA competitions).
(C) Champions

== FA Cup ==
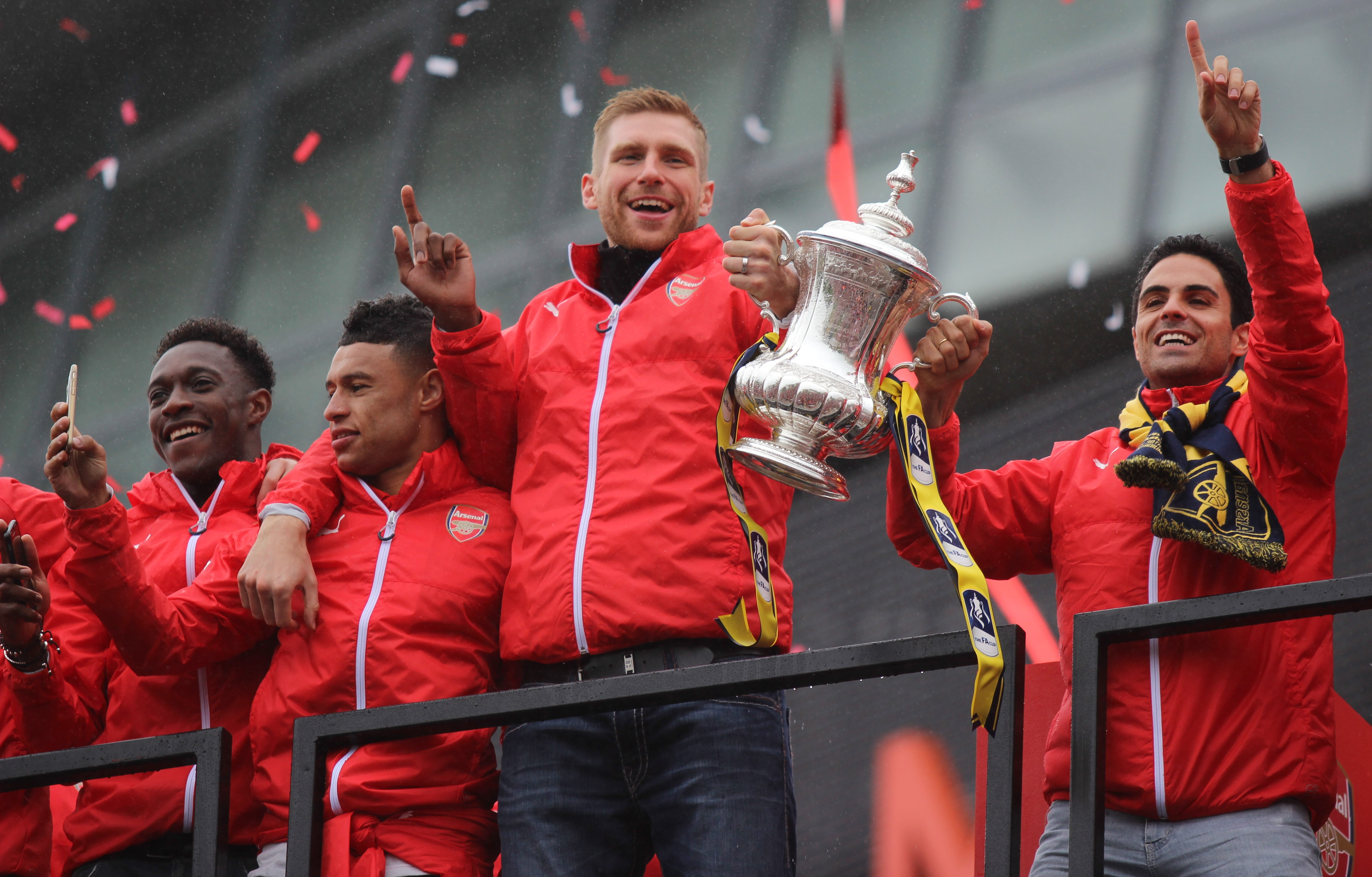
Arsenal players celebrating their FA Cup win during a victory parade

Arsenal entered the FA Cup as title holders, following their victory over Hull City in the previous edition's final. Their opening tie in January 2015 was a home match against Hull City, a repeat of the previous final; the "Gunners" won 2–0 with a corner set-piece headed in by Per Mertesacker along with a sharp turn and finish from Sánchez. In the following round away against Brighton & Hove Albion, Arsenal prevailed 3–2 with goals from Walcott, Özil and Rosický helping the club reach the fifth round of the competition.

In the following month, Arsenal defeated Middlesbrough 2–0 at the Emirates Stadium with both goals scored by Giroud; Gabriel Paulista also made his debut for the club during the match. In the quarter-finals played in March, Arsenal travelled to Old Trafford to play Manchester United. An early goal from Arsenal's Nacho Monreal was cancelled out by Rooney's flying header from Angel Di Maria's cross, the Argentine was later sent off following Welbeck's winner against his former club. Following their victory over Manchester United, the title holders were now "huge favourites" to win the competition.

Arsenal played EFL Championship side Reading in the semi-finals in April at Wembley Stadium, Arsenal gained a first half lead through a Sánchez close range finish. However, a Garath McCleary volley equalised the scoreline in the second half taking the match to extra time; in the 11th minute of extra time, Reading goalkeeper Adam Federici dropped Sánchez's late effort which sealed Arsenal's progression to the final. In Arsenal's final match of the season, they faced Aston Villa at Wembley Stadium on 30 May. The "Gunners" comfortably defeated Tim Sherwood's side 4–0 with goals from Walcott, Sánchez, Mertesacker and Giroud. The win marked the club's 12th FA Cup trophy, which made it the most successful team in the competition's history.

Match details

| 4 January 2015 Third round | Arsenal | 2–0 | Hull City | Holloway |
| 17:30 GMT | Mertesacker 20'; Sánchez (yellow card) 76', (goal) 82'; Coquelin (yellow card) 88' | Report | McShane (yellow card) 45+1'; Davies (yellow card) 85' | Stadium: Emirates Stadium; Attendance: 59,439; Referee: Robert Madley |

| 25 January 2015 Fourth round | Brighton & Hove Albion | 2–3 | Arsenal | Brighton |
| 16:00 GMT | O'Grady 50'; Baldock (yellow card) 73', (goal) 75'; Holla (yellow card) 79'; Greer (yellow card) 87'; Dunk (yellow card) 90+3' | Report | Walcott 2'; Özil 24'; Rosický 59' | Stadium: Falmer Stadium; Attendance: 30,278; Referee: Michael Oliver |

| 15 February 2015 Fifth round | Arsenal | 2–0 | Middlesbrough | Holloway |
| 16:00 GMT | Giroud 27', 29'; Gabriel (yellow card) 55' | Report | Vossen (yellow card) 85' | Stadium: Emirates Stadium; Attendance: 59,823; Referee: Mike Dean |

| 9 March 2015 Sixth round | Manchester United | 1–2 | Arsenal | Stretford |
| 19:45 GMT | Rooney 29'; Herrera (yellow card) 37'; Fellaini (yellow card) 59'; Young (yellow card) 60'; Rojo (yellow card) 64'; Di María (yellow card) 76' (yellow-red card) 77'; Januzaj (yellow card) 87' | Report | Bellerín (yellow card) 4'; Monreal 25'; Welbeck 61'; Ramsey (yellow card) 88' | Stadium: Old Trafford; Attendance: 74,285; Referee: Michael Oliver |

| 18 April 2015 Semi-finals | Reading | 1–2 (a.e.t.) | Arsenal | Wembley Park |
| 17:20 BST | Chalobah (yellow card) 45+2'; McCleary 54' | Report | Sánchez 39', 105+1'; Gabriel (yellow card) 108' | Stadium: Wembley Stadium; Attendance: 84,081; Referee: Martin Atkinson |

| 30 May 2015 Final | Arsenal | 4–0 | Aston Villa | Wembley Park |
| 17:30 BST | Walcott 40'; Sánchez 50'; Mertesacker 62'; Giroud 90+3' | Report | Cleverley (yellow card) 14'; Hutton (yellow card) 33'; Delph (yellow card) 37'; Westwood (yellow card) 52'; Agbonlahor (yellow card) 83' | Stadium: Wembley Stadium; Attendance: 89,283; Referee: Jonathan Moss |

== Football League Cup ==
Arsenal entered the Football League Cup in the third round, receiving a bye in the first and second rounds due to the club's Premier League status and participation in European competition. Arsenal left the competition in the third round following a 2–1 home defeat to Southampton. Despite an early goal from Sánchez, goals from Southampton's Dušan Tadić and Nathaniel Clyne meant that the "Saints" qualified for the following round instead of Arsenal.

Match details

| 23 September 2014 Third round | Arsenal | 1–2 | Southampton | Holloway |
| 19:45 BST | Sánchez 13'; Rosický (yellow card) 87'; Wilshere (yellow card) 90+2' | Report | Tadić 20' (pen.); Wanyama (yellow card) 26'; Clyne 38'; Targett (yellow card) 85'; Forster (yellow card) 90+2'; Pellè (yellow card) 90+3' | Stadium: Emirates Stadium; Attendance: 59,621; Referee: Keith Stroud |

== UEFA Champions League ==
=== Play-off round ===
Arsenal qualified for the play-off round of the UEFA Champions League on virtue of finishing fourth in the Premier League the preceding season. The club faced a two-legged tie in August 2014 against Turkish side Beşiktaş; the two clubs played a 0–0 draw in Istanbul during the first leg with Ramsey being sent off after having been cautioned twice. In the second-leg at the Emirates Stadium, Arsenal qualified for the group stage after a 1–0 win with Sánchez scoring his first goal for the club and the only goal of the match.

Match details

| 19 August 2014 First leg | Beşiktaş (Turkey) | 0–0 | (England) Arsenal | Istanbul, Turkey |
| 19:45 BST | Motta (yellow card) 53'; Özyakup (yellow card) 77' | Report | Ramsey (yellow card) 54' (yellow-red card) 80'; Flamini (yellow card) 56'; Monreal (yellow card) 66' | Stadium: Atatürk Olympic Stadium; Attendance: 41,531; Referee: Milorad Mažić (Serbia) |

| 27 August 2014 Second leg | Arsenal (England) | 1–0 (1–0 agg.) | (Turkey) Beşiktaş | Holloway |
| 19:45 BST | Sánchez 45+1'; Debuchy (yellow card) 14' (yellow-red card) 75'; Chambers (yellow card) 77'; Szczęsny (yellow card) 86' | Report | Kavlak (yellow card) 23'; Özyakup (yellow card) 32'; Franco (yellow card) 59'; Hutchinson (yellow card) 79'; Uysal (yellow card) 85'; Töre (yellow card) 90' | Stadium: Emirates Stadium; Attendance: 59,946; Referee: Pedro Proença (Portugal) |

=== Group stage ===
On 29 August, Arsenal were drawn into group D with German side Borussia Dortmund, Belgium side Anderlecht and Turkish side Galatasaray. In Arsenal's first group stage match in September away against Borussia Dortmund, the German side won 2–0 with goals from Pierre-Emerick Aubameyang and Ciro Immobile; academy graduate Bellerín also made his first start for the club. At the start of October, Arsenal returned to the competition with a comprehensive 4–1 home victory over Galatasaray. Welbeck scored his first senior hat-trick against the Turkish side and Szczęsny was sent off after he fouled Burak Yılmaz, conceding a penalty. With David Ospina starting in goal following Szczęsny's suspension, the "Gunners" later travelled to Belgium to defeat Anderlecht 2–1 with two late goals from Gibbs and Podolski, now halfway through the group stage Arsenal were placed second behind Borussia Dortmund. In November, Anderlecht came to a rain-lashed Emirates Stadium and drew 3–3 with Arsenal who had a 3–0 lead; the goals from Arteta, Sánchez and Oxlade-Chamberlain were cancelled out by one goal from Anderlecht's Aleksandar Mitrović and two from Anthony Vanden Borre. Arsenal qualified for the knockout phase after they defeated Borussia Dortmund 2–0 at home with goals from Sanogo and Sánchez; they wrapped up their group stage campaign finishing second after a comfortable 4–1 away win over Galatasaray in December.

Group D classification

| Pos | Team | Pld | W | D | L | GF | GA | GD | Pts | Qualification | DOR | ARS | AND | GAL |
|---|---|---|---|---|---|---|---|---|---|---|---|---|---|---|
| 1 | (Germany) Borussia Dortmund | 6 | 4 | 1 | 1 | 14 | 4 | +10 | 13 | Advance to knockout phase | — | 2–0 | 1–1 | 4–1 |
| 2 | (England) Arsenal | 6 | 4 | 1 | 1 | 15 | 8 | +7 | 13 | Advance to knockout phase | 2–0 | — | 3–3 | 4–1 |
| 3 | (Belgium) Anderlecht | 6 | 1 | 3 | 2 | 8 | 10 | −2 | 6 | Transfer to Europa League | 0–3 | 1–2 | — | 2–0 |
| 4 | (Turkey) Galatasaray | 6 | 0 | 1 | 5 | 4 | 19 | −15 | 1 | | 0–4 | 1–4 | 1–1 | — |

Source: UEFA
Rules for classification: Group stage tiebreakers

Match details

| 16 September 2014 1 | Borussia Dortmund (Germany) | 2–0 | (England) Arsenal | Dortmund, Germany |
| 19:45 BST | Mkhitaryan (yellow card) 5'; Immobile 45'; Aubameyang 48' | Report | Özil (yellow card) 54'; Wilshere (yellow card) 88' | Stadium: Signal Iduna Park; Attendance: 65,851; Referee: Olegário Benquerença (Portugal) |

| 1 October 2014 2 | Arsenal (England) | 4–1 | (Turkey) Galatasaray | Holloway |
| 19:45 BST | Welbeck 22', 30', 52'; Sánchez 41'; Flamini (yellow card) 44'; Szczęsny (red card) 60' | Report | Melo (yellow card) 34'; Džemaili (yellow card) 43'; Yılmaz 61' (pen.) | Stadium: Emirates Stadium; Attendance: 59,803; Referee: Gianluca Rocchi (Italy) |

| 22 October 2014 3 | Anderlecht (Belgium) | 1–2 | (England) Arsenal | Anderlecht, Belgium |
| 19:45 BST | Najar 71'; Deschacht (yellow card) 80' | Report | Monreal (yellow card) 8'; Welbeck (yellow card) 66'; Gibbs 89'; Podolski 90+1' | Stadium: Constant Vanden Stock Stadium; Attendance: 19,881; Referee: Carlos Velasco Carballo (Spain) |

| 4 November 2014 4 | Arsenal (England) | 3–3 | (Belgium) Anderlecht | Holloway |
| 19:45 GMT | Arteta 25' (pen.); Sánchez 29'; Oxlade-Chamberlain 58'; Monreal (yellow card) 72' | Report | Vanden Borre 61', 73' (pen.), (yellow card) 90+3'; Kljestan (yellow card) 87'; Mitrović (yellow card) 89' (goal) 90' | Stadium: Emirates Stadium; Attendance: 59,872; Referee: Clément Turpin (France) |

| 26 November 2014 5 | Arsenal (England) | 2–0 | (Germany) Borussia Dortmund | Holloway |
| 19:45 GMT | Sanogo 2'; Arteta (yellow card) 15'; Sánchez 57' | Report | Subotić (yellow card) 13'; Piszczek (yellow card) 37' | Stadium: Emirates Stadium; Attendance: 59,902; Referee: Viktor Kassai (Hungary) |

| 9 December 2014 6 | Galatasaray (Turkey) | 1–4 | (England) Arsenal | Istanbul, Turkey |
| 19:45 GMT | Melo (yellow card) 33'; Çamdal (yellow card) 43'; Kaya (yellow card) 57'; Sneijder 88' | Report | Podolski 3', 90+2' (yellow card) 65'; Ramsey 11', 29'; Flamini (yellow card) 15'; Debuchy (yellow card) 65' | Stadium: Türk Telekom Arena; Attendance: 20,590; Referee: David Fernández Borbalán (Spain) |

=== Knockout phase ===
==== Round of 16 ====
On 15 December, Arsenal were drawn against Ligue 1 side Monaco for their round of 16 tie. Arsenal faced the prospect of exiting the tournament at this stage after they were defeated convincingly in February 2015 during the first leg at home; Phil McNulty from BBC Sport characterised Arsenal's performance as incompetent and naive. Despite a consolidation goal from Oxlade-Chamberlain, goals from Geoffrey Kondogbia, Yannick Carrasco and former Tottenham Hotspur striker Dimitar Berbatov meant that Monaco had a strong second-leg advantage. Arsenal travelled to the Stade Louis II the following month with the hope of turning the tie around with a two-goal deficit; despite winning the match with an improved performance, the "Gunners" left the competition by the away goals rule having drawn 3–3 on aggregate. Needing to score at least three unanswered goals, Arsenal started strong with Giroud's composed close-range goal in the 36th minute, and they later came close to scoring again before half-time with Welbeck's effort. Ramsey came off the bench to score a late goal in the second half, but the team couldn't score a third despite overwhelming pressure on Monaco's defence. This was the fifth straight season which Arsenal left the Champions League at the round of 16 stage.

Match details

| 25 February 2015 First leg | Arsenal (England) | 1–3 | (France) Monaco | Holloway |
| 19:45 GMT | Coquelin (yellow card) 42'; Bellerín (yellow card) 74'; Özil (yellow card) 87'; Oxlade-Chamberlain 90+1' | Report | Kondogbia 38'; Echiéjilé (yellow card) 45'; Berbatov 53'; Moutinho (yellow card) 90+2'; Carrasco 90+4' | Stadium: Emirates Stadium; Attendance: 59,868; Referee: Deniz Aytekin (Germany) |

| 17 March 2015 Second leg | Monaco (France) | 0–2 (3a–3 agg.) | (England) Arsenal | Fontvieille, Monaco |
| 19:45 GMT | Kondogbia (yellow card) 52' | Report | Giroud 36'; Sánchez (yellow card) 42'; Ramsey 79' | Stadium: Stade Louis II; Attendance: 17,263; Referee: Svein Oddvar Moen (Norway) |

== Postseason ==
"He is very positive, always wants to go forward, wants to hurt the opponent and he is also – what the fans like with him – a fighter. He is a guy who has a good combination of talent, combative aspect and fighting spirit."

— Wenger commenting on Sánchez's Player of the Season award

Following Arsenal's season, Sánchez was voted Arsenal Player of the Season by club supporters; the Chilean scored 25 goals for the "Gunners" in his debut campaign. Sánchez was included in the PFA Premier League Team of the Year, and was also voted PFA Fans' Player of the Year, FSF Player of the Year, Facebook Premier League Player of the Year, and Kids' Choice UK's Favourite Footballer.

Wilshere's Premier League goal scored against West Bromwich Albion on the final match day was voted BBC Goal of the Season. The online poll was surged with Arsenal supporters from Twitter that voted for Wilshere, who won the award with 34% of votes.

== Squad statistics ==
Key

GK = Goalkeeper

DF = Defender

MF = Midfielder

FW = Forward

= Yellow cards

= Red cards

Numbers in parentheses denote appearances as substitute. Players with number struck through and marked † left the club during the playing season.

Arsenal 2014–15 season player statistics
| No. | Pos. | Nat. | Name | Premier League | | FA Cup | | League Cup | | UEFA Champions League | | FA Community Shield | | Total | | Discipline | |
| No. | Pos. | Nat. | Name | Apps | Goals | Apps | Goals | Apps | Goals | Apps | Goals | Apps | Goals | Apps | Goals | A yellow rectangular card | A red rectangular card |
|---|---|---|---|---|---|---|---|---|---|---|---|---|---|---|---|---|---|
| 1 | GK | POL | Wojciech Szczęsny | 17 | 0 | 5 | 0 | 0 | 0 | 6 | 0 | 1 | 0 | 29 | 0 | 2 | 1 |
| 2 | DF | FRA | Mathieu Debuchy | 10 | 1 | 1 | 0 | 0 | 0 | 3 | 0 | 1 | 0 | 15 | 1 | 3 | 1 |
| 3 | DF | ENG | Kieran Gibbs | 18 (4) | 0 | 3 | 0 | 0 | 0 | 6 (1) | 1 | 1 | 0 | 28 (5) | 1 | 3 | 0 |
| 4 | DF | GER | Per Mertesacker | 35 | 0 | 4 | 2 | 0 | 0 | 9 | 0 | 0 | 0 | 48 | 2 | 2 | 0 |
| 5 | DF | BRA | Gabriel Paulista | 4 (2) | 0 | 1 (1) | 0 | 0 | 0 | 0 | 0 | 0 | 0 | 5 (3) | 0 | 2 | 0 |
| 6 | DF | FRA | Laurent Koscielny | 26 (1) | 3 | 5 | 0 | 0 | 0 | 6 | 0 | 1 | 0 | 38 (1) | 3 | 4 | 0 |
| 7 | MF | CZE | Tomáš Rosický | 5 (10) | 2 | 2 (1) | 1 | 1 | 0 | 0 (4) | 0 | 0 (1) | 0 | 8 (16) | 3 | 2 | 0 |
| 8 | MF | ESP | Mikel Arteta | 6 (1) | 0 | 0 | 0 | 0 | 0 | 4 | 1 | 1 | 0 | 11 (1) | 1 | 2 | 0 |
| ~~9~~ | FW | GER | Lukas Podolski † | 0 (7) | 0 | 0 | 0 | 1 | 0 | 1 (4) | 3 | 0 | 0 | 2 (11) | 3 | 1 | 0 |
| 10 | MF | ENG | Jack Wilshere | 9 (5) | 2 | 0 (1) | 0 | 1 | 0 | 4 (1) | 0 | 1 | 0 | 15 (7) | 2 | 6 | 0 |
| 11 | MF | GER | Mesut Özil | 21 (1) | 4 | 5 | 1 | 0 | 0 | 5 | 0 | 0 | 0 | 31 (1) | 5 | 2 | 0 |
| 12 | FW | FRA | Olivier Giroud | 21 (6) | 14 | 2 (3) | 3 | 0 | 0 | 3 | 1 | 0 (1) | 1 | 26 (10) | 19 | 5 | 1 |
| 13 | GK | COL | David Ospina | 18 | 0 | 1 | 0 | 1 | 0 | 2 (1) | 0 | 0 | 0 | 22 (1) | 0 | 0 | 0 |
| 14 | FW | ENG | Theo Walcott | 4 (10) | 5 | 3 (2) | 2 | 0 | 0 | 0 (2) | 0 | 0 | 0 | 7 (14) | 7 | 0 | 0 |
| 15 | MF | ENG | Alex Oxlade-Chamberlain | 17 (6) | 1 | 1 (2) | 0 | 0 (1) | 0 | 5 (4) | 2 | 0 (1) | 0 | 23 (14) | 3 | 4 | 0 |
| 16 | MF | WAL | Aaron Ramsey | 23 (6) | 6 | 3 (1) | 0 | 0 | 0 | 6 (1) | 3 | 1 | 1 | 33 (8) | 10 | 7 | 1 |
| 17 | FW | CHI | Alexis Sánchez | 34 (1) | 16 | 5 (1) | 4 | 1 | 1 | 9 | 4 | 1 | 0 | 50 (2) | 25 | 6 | 0 |
| 18 | DF | ESP | Nacho Monreal | 26 (2) | 0 | 4 | 1 | 0 | 0 | 6 | 0 | 0 (1) | 0 | 36 (3) | 1 | 6 | 0 |
| 19 | MF | ESP | Santi Cazorla | 33 (4) | 7 | 5 | 0 | 0 (1) | 0 | 8 (1) | 0 | 1 | 1 | 47 (6) | 8 | 5 | 0 |
| 20 | MF | FRA | Mathieu Flamini | 15 (8) | 1 | 2 | 0 | 0 | 0 | 4 (3) | 0 | 0 (1) | 0 | 21 (12) | 1 | 6 | 0 |
| 21 | DF | ENG | Calum Chambers | 17 (6) | 1 | 3 (1) | 0 | 1 | 0 | 6 (1) | 0 | 1 | 0 | 28 (8) | 1 | 8 | 1 |
| ~~22~~ | FW | FRA | Yaya Sanogo † | 2 (1) | 0 | 0 | 0 | 0 | 0 | 2 | 1 | 1 | 0 | 5 (1) | 1 | 0 | 0 |
| 23 | FW | ENG | Danny Welbeck | 18 (7) | 4 | 3 | 1 | 0 | 0 | 6 | 3 | 0 | 0 | 27 (7) | 8 | 4 | 0 |
| 24 | MF | FRA | Abou Diaby | 0 | 0 | 0 | 0 | 1 | 0 | 0 | 0 | 0 | 0 | 1 | 0 | 0 | 0 |
| ~~26~~ | GK | ARG | Emiliano Martínez † | 3 (1) | 0 | 0 | 0 | 0 | 0 | 2 | 0 | 0 | 0 | 5 (1) | 0 | 0 | 0 |
| ~~28~~ | FW | CRI | Joel Campbell † | 0 (4) | 0 | 1 | 0 | 1 | 0 | 1 (2) | 0 | 0 (1) | 0 | 3 (7) | 0 | 0 | 0 |
| ~~34~~ | MF | FRA | Francis Coquelin † | 19 (3) | 0 | 4 (1) | 0 | 1 | 0 | 2 | 0 | 0 | 0 | 26 (4) | 0 | 7 | 0 |
| 35 | MF | GER | Gedion Zelalem | 0 | 0 | 0 | 0 | 0 | 0 | 0 (1) | 0 | 0 | 0 | 0 (1) | 0 | 0 | 0 |
| ~~38~~ | FW | ENG | Chuba Akpom † | 0 (3) | 0 | 0 (3) | 0 | 0 (1) | 0 | 0 | 0 | 0 | 0 | 0 (7) | 0 | 0 | 0 |
| 39 | DF | ESP | Héctor Bellerín | 17 (3) | 2 | 3 | 0 | 1 | 0 | 4 | 0 | 0 | 0 | 25 (3) | 2 | 7 | 0 |
| 42 | DF | ENG | Isaac Hayden | 0 | 0 | 0 | 0 | 1 | 0 | 0 | 0 | 0 | 0 | 1 | 0 | 0 | 0 |
| 70 | MF | ENG | Ainsley Maitland-Niles | 0 (1) | 0 | 0 (1) | 0 | 0 | 0 | 0 (1) | 0 | 0 | 0 | 0 (3) | 0 | 0 | 0 |
| 73 | DF | ENG | Stefan O'Connor | 0 | 0 | 0 | 0 | 0 | 0 | 0 (1) | 0 | 0 | 0 | 0 (1) | 0 | 0 | 0 |
| — | | | Own goals | — | 2 | — | | — | | — | | — | | — | 2 | — | |

== Transfers ==
For consistency, transfer fees in the tables below are all exclusively sourced from BBC Sport's contemporary report of each transfer. Arsenal did not sign any players on loan during the season.

Transfers in
| No. | Pos. | Player | Transferred from | Fee | Date | Ref. |
|---|---|---|---|---|---|---|
| — | DF | Ilias Chatzitheodoridis (GRE) | (Greece) Mas Kallitheakos | Undisclosed | 1 July 2014 (Note: Chatzitheodoridis' transfer from Mas Kallitheakos was announced on 6 June 2014, before the season started) | |
| — | MF | Ben Sheaf (ENG) | (England) West Ham United | Undisclosed | 2 July 2014 | |
| — | GK | Hugo Keto (FIN) | (Finland) HJK | Undisclosed | 4 July 2014 | |
| 17 | FW | Alexis Sánchez (CHI) | (Spain) Barcelona | £35m | 10 July 2014 | |
| 2 | DF | Mathieu Debuchy (FRA) | (England) Newcastle United | Undisclosed | 17 July 2014 | |
| 13 | GK | David Ospina (COL) | (France) Nice | £3m | 27 July 2014 | |
| 21 | DF | Calum Chambers (ENG) | (England) Southampton | £16m | 28 July 2014 | |
| 23 | FW | Danny Welbeck (ENG) | (England) Manchester United | £16m | 2 September 2014 | |
| 36 | MF | Krystian Bielik (POL) | (Poland) Legia Warsaw | £2.4m | 21 January 2015 | |
| 5 | DF | Gabriel Paulista (BRA) | (Spain) Villarreal | £11.2m | 28 January 2015 | |

Transfers out
| No. | Pos. | Player | Following club | Fee | Date | Ref. |
|---|---|---|---|---|---|---|
| 43 | DF | Zachari Fagan (ENG) | (England) Welling United | Released | 30 June 2014 (Note: Fagan signed a pre-contract agreement with Welling United on 20 May 2014) | |
| 21 | GK | Łukasz Fabiański (POL) | (England) Swansea City | Released | 30 June 2014 (Note: Fabiański signed a pre-contract agreement with Swansea City on 29 May 2014) | |
| 39 | FW | Zak Ansah (GHA) | (England) Charlton Athletic | Released | 30 June 2014 (Note: Ansah signed a pre-contract agreement with Charlton Athletic on 9 June 2014) | |
| 3 | DF | Bacary Sagna (FRA) | (England) Manchester City | Released | 30 June 2014 (Note: Sagna signed a pre-contract agreement with Manchester City on 13 June 2014) | |
| 38 | MF | Chuks Aneke (ENG) | (Belgium) Zulte Waregem | Released | 30 June 2014 (Note: Aneke signed a pre-contract agreement with Zulte Waregem on 21 June 2014) | |
| 55 | DF | Leander Siemann (GER) | (Portugal) Porto B | Released | 30 June 2014 (Note: Siemann later joined Porto B on 2 August 2014 as a free agent) | |
| 23 | FW | Nicklas Bendtner (DEN) | (Germany) VfL Wolfsburg | Released | 30 June 2014 (Note: Bendtner later joined VfL Wolfsburg on 15 August 2014 as a free agent) | |
| 30 | FW | Park Chu-young (KOR) | (Saudi Arabia) Al Shabab | Released | 30 June 2014 (Note: Park later joined Al Shabab on 9 October 2014 as a free agent) | |
| 41 | DF | Daniel Boateng (ENG) | (Bosnia and Herzegovina) Olimpik | Released | 30 June 2014 (Note: Boateng later joined Olimpik on 15 January 2015 as a free agent) | |
| 42 | MF | Thomas Eisfeld (GER) | (England) Fulham | Undisclosed | 23 July 2014 | |
| — | DF | Johan Djourou (SWI) | (Germany) Hamburger SV | Undisclosed | 7 August 2014 | |
| 5 | DF | Thomas Vermaelen (BEL) | (Spain) Barcelona | £15m | 9 August 2014 | |
| 51 | DF | Ignasi Miquel (ESP) | (England) Norwich City | Undisclosed | 1 September 2014 | |
| 53 | MF | Kristoffer Olsson (SWE) | (Denmark) Midtjylland | Undisclosed | 6 January 2015 | |
| 36 | FW | Benik Afobe (ENG) (Note: Afobe later changed his nationality to represent DR Congo at international level in 2016) | (England) Wolverhampton Wanderers | Undisclosed | 14 January 2015 | |

Loans out
| No. | Pos. | Player | Loaned to | Date | Loan expired | Ref. |
|---|---|---|---|---|---|---|
| 58 | FW | Wellington Silva (BRA) | (Spain) Almería | 21 July 2014 | 30 June 2015 | |
| 25 | DF | Carl Jenkinson (ENG) | (England) West Ham United | 31 July 2014 | 30 June 2015 | |
| 36 | FW | Benik Afobe (ENG) | (England) Milton Keynes Dons | 4 August 2014 | 14 January 2015 (Note: Afobe transferred to Wolverhampton Wanderers on 14 January 2015, terminating his loan spell scheduled to finish at the end of the season) | |
| 48 | FW | Austin Lipman (ENG) | (England) Boreham Wood | 7 August 2014 | 30 June 2015 | |
| 56 | MF | Jon Toral (ESP) | (England) Brentford | 15 August 2014 | 30 June 2015 | |
| 31 | FW | Ryo Miyaichi (JAP) | (Netherlands) Twente | 1 September 2014 | 30 June 2015 | |
| 53 | MF | Kristoffer Olsson (SWE) | (Denmark) Midtjylland | 2 September 2014 | 31 December 2014 | |
| 46 | MF | Jack Jebb (ENG) | (England) Stevenage | 16 October 2014 | 17 January 2015 (Note: Originally planned as a one-month loan, Jebb extended his loan to finish on 17 January 2015) | |
| 46 | MF | Jack Jebb (ENG) | (England) Stevenage | 26 March 2015 | 30 June 2015 | |
| 34 | MF | Francis Coquelin (FRA) | (England) Charlton Athletic | 3 November 2014 | 12 December 2014 (Note: Originally scheduled for a month, Coquelin's loan to Charlton Athletic was extended to 30 December 2014, he then returned to Arsenal early on 12 December 2014) | |
| 57 | GK | Josh Vickers (ENG) | (England) Concord Rangers | 7 November 2014 | 30 June 2015 (Note: Originally scheduled for a month, Vickers' loan to Concord Rangers was later extended to last the entire season) | |
| 9 | FW | Lukas Podolski (GER) | (Italy) Inter Milan | 5 January 2015 | 30 June 2015 | |
| 49 | GK | Matt Macey (ENG) | (England) Accrington Stanley | 8 January 2015 | 7 February 2015 | |
| 22 | FW | Yaya Sanogo (FRA) | (England) Crystal Palace | 13 January 2015 | 30 June 2015 | |
| 28 | FW | Joel Campbell (CRI) | (Spain) Villarreal | 27 January 2015 | 30 June 2015 | |
| 26 | GK | Emiliano Martínez (ARG) | (England) Rotherham United | 20 March 2015 | 30 June 2015 | |
| 37 | DF | Semi Ajayi (NGA) | (England) Cardiff City | 25 March 2015 | 30 June 2015 | |
| 38 | FW | Chuba Akpom (ENG) | (England) Nottingham Forest | 26 March 2015 | 30 June 2015 | |

== See also ==
- 2014–15 in English football
- List of Arsenal F.C. seasons
