= Evan Siemann =

American academic

Evan Siemann is a professor in the Biosciences Department at Rice University in Houston, Texas. He received his AB from Cornell University in 1990 and his PhD from the University of Minnesota in 1997. The focus of his research has been investigating how local environmental factors (e.g. enemies, resources, disturbance regime and recruitment limitation) interact with post-invasion adaptation to determine the likelihood and severity of Chinese tallow tree (Sapium sebiferum) invasions into East Texas coastal prairie, mesic forests, and floodplain forests. The results of this research have been highlighted in Science Daily, Environmental News Service, and The Sciences. He has explored the ecosystem level impacts of exotic tree invasions into coastal prairies. His research group is engaged in a number of applied research projects related to controlling exotic plant and animal invasions into Texas ecosystems.

== Selected publications ==
- Zou, J., Rogers, W.E., and Siemann, E. 2009. Plasticity of Sapium sebiferum seedling growth to light and water resources: Inter- and intraspecific comparisons. Basic and Applied Ecology 10:79–88.
- Zou, J., Siemann, E. and Rogers, W.E.,. 2008. Decreased resistance and increased tolerance to native herbivores of the invasive plant Sapium sebiferum. Ecography 31:663–671.
- Rua, MA, NIjjer, S, Johnson, A, Rogers, WE, and Siemann, E. 2008. Experimental approaches to test allelopathy: A case study using the invader Sapium sebiferum. Allelopathy Journal 22:1–13.
- Horn, K.C., Johnson, S.D., Boles, K.M., Moore, A., Siemann, E., and Gabler, C.A. 2008. Factors affecting hatching success of golden apple snail eggs: effects of water immersion and cannibalism. Wetlands 28:544–549.
- Zou, J., Rogers, W.E., and Siemann, E. . 2008. Increased competitive ability and herbivory tolerance of the invasive plant Sapium sebiferum. Biological Invasions 10:291–302.
- Nijjer, S., Rogers, W.E., Lee, C.A., and Siemann, E.. 2008. The effects of soil biota and fertilization on the success of Sapium sebiferum Applied Soil Ecology 38:1–11.
- Siemann E, Rogers WE, and Dewalt SJ. 2006. Rapid adaptation of insect herbivores to an invasive plant. Proc R Soc B 273:2763–2769.
- Zou J, Rogers WE, Dewalt SJ, Siemann E. 2006. The effect of Chinese tallow tree (Sapium sebiferum) ecotype on soil-plant system carbon and nitrogen processes. Oecologia. 150: 272–281.
- Bossdorf O, Auge H, Lafuma L, Rogers WE, Siemann E, Prati D. 2005. Phenotypic and genetic differentiation between native and introduced plant populations. Oecologia. 2005 Jun;144(1):1–11
- Siemann, E. and W.E. Rogers. 2003. Changes in light and nitrogen availability under pioneer trees may facilitate tree invasions of grasslands. Journal of Ecology 91:923–931.
- Siemann, E. and W. E. Rogers. 2003. Herbivory, disease, recruitment limitation and success of alien and native tree species. Ecology 84:1489–1505.
- Siemann, E. and W.E. Rogers. 2001. Genetic differences in growth of an invasive tree species. Ecology Letters 4:514–518.
- Siemann, E. 1998. Experimental tests of the effects of plant productivity and plant diversity on grassland arthropod diversity. Ecology 79:2057–2070.
- Tilman, D, J. Knops, D. Wedin, P. Reich, M. Ritchie and E. Siemann. 1997. Functional diversity and composition simultaneously influence ecosystem processes. Science 277: 1300–1302.
- Siemann, E., D. Tilman and J. Haarstad. 1996. Insect species diversity, abundance and body size relationships. Nature 380:704–706.
