= Leander Siemann =

German footballer

Personal information
- Date of birth: 25 October 1995 (age 31)
- Place of birth: Berlin, Germany
- Height: 1.86 m (6 ft 1 in)
- Position: Centre-back

Youth career
- 2010–2011: Hertha BSC
- 2011–2014: Arsenal

Senior career*
Years	Team	Apps	(Gls)
2014–2015	Porto B	5	(0)
2016–2018	1. FC Köln II	38	(0)
2018–2019	Berliner AK 07	27	(2)
2019–2020	Berliner AK 07	14	(0)
2020–2021	SC Verl	1	(0)
- * Club domestic league appearances and goals as of 15:44, 21 July 2021 (UTC)

Leander Siemann (born 25 October 1995) is a German professional footballer who most recently played as a centre-back for SC Verl. In 2015 Siemann received a one-year suspension for using banned substances.

== Club career ==
Born in Berlin, Siemann started his youth career with Hertha BSC, where he was described by youth manager Frank Vogel as ‘He is dynamic, strong and good in one-on-ones.’ In March 2011, he joined Arsenal academy for £220,000 after passing a one-week trial with the club. In May 2014, he was released by the club. He consequently joined Segunda Liga team Porto B.

On 8 April 2015, it was announced that Siemann got a one-year suspension for using banned substances. It was the first doping case in Portugal in the last three years. He played five matches for Porto's reserve team and left the club at the end of the 2014–15 season.

He trialled with 1. FC Köln II in June 2016.

Siemann joined Berliner AK 07 in July 2018 on a one-year contract and left the club at the end of the season. However, he returned to the club on 3 September 2019, signing a contract for the 2019–20 season.

In September 2020 Siemann signed with SC Verl, newly promoted to the 3. Liga, after trialling with the club and playing in a 5–4 friendly win against Schalke 04.

== See also ==
- List of doping cases in sport
