= 2016 Knattspyrnufélag Reykjavíkur season =

Knattspyrnufélag Reykjavíkur (KR)
2016 season
- Manager: Bjarni Guðjónsson
- Stadium: Alvogenvöllurinn
- Borgunarbikarinn: Round of 32
- Lengjubikarinn: Winners
- Top goalscorer: League: 1 Kennie Chopart; Óskar Örn Hauksson; Pálmi Rafn Pálmason; Indriði Sigurðsson; All: 5 Hólmbert Aron Friðjónsson; Morten Beck Andersen; Óskar Örn Hauksson
Home colours	Away colours

The 2016 season will be KR's 102nd season in Úrvalsdeild and their 38th consecutive season in top-flight of Icelandic Football.

Along with the Úrvalsdeild, the club also compete in the Lengjubikarinn, the Borgunarbikarinn and the 2016–17 UEFA Europa League where they entered in the first qualifying round.

Bjarni Guðjónsson will head coach the team for the second season running. He will be assisted by former KR striker Guðmundur Benediktsson.

On 21 April KR won the Icelandic League Cup, Lengjubikarinn, with a 2–0 win against Víkingur R.

On 25 May KR lost to Selfoss in the 3rd round of the Icelandic Cup, Borgunarbikarinn. This was the first time that the team did not qualify through to the 4th round.

== First team ==
=== Current squad ===
As of 22 April 2016. These players competed in Úrvalsdeild, Borgunarbikarinn, Lengjubikarinn, Europa League

Note: Flags indicate national team as defined under FIFA eligibility rules; some limited exceptions apply. Players may hold more than one non-FIFA nationality.

No.	Pos.	Nation	Player
1	GK	(Iceland) ISL	Stefán Logi Magnússon
2	DF	(Denmark) DEN	Morten Beck
3	DF	(Iceland) ISL	Ástbjörn Þórðarson
4	MF	(Denmark) DEN	Michael Præst
6	DF	(Iceland) ISL	Gunnar Þór Gunnarsson
7	DF	(Iceland) ISL	Skúli Jón Friðgeirsson
8	MF	(Iceland) ISL	Finnur Orri Margeirsson
9	FW	(Iceland) ISL	Hólmbert Aron Friðjónsson
10	MF	(Iceland) ISL	Pálmi Rafn Pálmason (Vice-captain)
11	FW	(Denmark) DEN	Morten Beck Andersen
13	GK	(Iceland) ISL	Sindri Snær Jensson

No.	Pos.	Nation	Player
16	DF	(Iceland) ISL	Indriði Sigurðsson (Captain)
17	FW	(Denmark) DEN	Kennie Chopart
18	DF	(Iceland) ISL	Aron Bjarki Jóspesson
20	MF	(Denmark) DEN	Denis Fazlagic
21	MF	(Iceland) ISL	Atli Hrafn Andrason
22	MF	(Iceland) ISL	Óskar Örn Hauksson
23	FW	(Iceland) ISL	Guðmundur Andri Tryggvason
24	MF	(Iceland) ISL	Valtýr Már Michaelsson
28	MF	(Iceland) ISL	Óliver Dagur Thorlacius
30	FW	(Iceland) ISL	Axel Sigurðarson
—	DF	(Iceland) ISL	Kjartan Franklín Magnús

== Transfers and loans ==
=== Transfers in ===
Date	Position	No.	Player	From club	Other	Ref
9 October 2015	DF	16	(Iceland) Indriði Sigurðsson	(Norway) Viking FK		
16 October 2015	MF	4	(Denmark) Michael Præst	(Iceland) Stjarnan		
2 December 2015	MF	8	(Iceland) Finnur Orri Margeirsson	(Norway) Lillestrøm SK		
3 February 2016	FW	17	(Denmark) Kennie Chopart	(Iceland) Fjölnir		
5 February 2016	FW	11	(Denmark) Morten Beck Andersen	(Denmark) Hobro IK		
22 March 2016	DF	2	(Denmark) Morten Beck	(Denmark) SønderjyskE		
19 April 2016	MF	20	(Denmark) Denis Fazlagic	(Denmark) Vejle Boldklub		

=== Transfers out ===
Date	Position	No.	Player	To club	Other	Ref
12 October 2015	FW	9	(Iceland) Þorsteinn Már Ragnarsson	(Iceland) Víkingur Ó		
15 October 2015	DF	2	(Iceland) Grétar Sigfinnur Sigurðarson	(Iceland) Stjarnan		
12 November 2015	MF	8	(Iceland) Jónas Guðni Sævarsson	(Iceland) Keflavík		
5 December 2015	DF	3	(Denmark) Rasmus Christiansen	(Iceland) Valur		
27 January 2016	FW	19	(Denmark) Søren Frederiksen	(Denmark) Viborg FF		
3 February 2016	MF	11	(Iceland) Almarr Ormarsson	(Iceland) KA		
15 February 2016	FW	7	(England) Gary Martin	(Iceland) Víkingur R.		
3 March 2016	DF	4	(Uruguay) Gonzalo Balbi Lorenzo		Left by Mutual Consent	

=== Loans out ===
Start Date	End Date	Position	No.	Player	To Club	Ref
18 March 2016	16 October 2016	DF		(Iceland) Leifur Þorbjarnarson	(Iceland) KV	
6 April 2016	16 October 2016	GK	12	(Iceland) Hörður Fannar Björgvinsson	(Iceland) Stjarnan	
21 April 2016	16 October 2016	MF	29	(Iceland) Júlí Karlsson	(Iceland) Grótta	

== Pre-season ==
=== Reykjavík Cup ===
KR took part in the 2016 Reykjavík Cup, a pre-season tournament for clubs from Reykjavík.

The team played in Group A along with Leiknir R., Víkingur R., ÍR and Fylkir. KR finished fourth in the group with 6 points and did not make the semi-finals.

Date	Round	Opponents	Stadium	Result F–A	Scorers
14 January 2016	Group stage	Víkingur R.	Egilshöll	2–3	Pálmi Rafn 9' Aron Bjarki 82'(pen.)
20 January 2016	Group stage	Fylkir	Egilshöll	1–0	Hólmbert Aron 92'
24 January 2016	Group stage	Leiknir R.	Egilshöll	1–5	Axel S. 20'
29 January 2016	Group stages	ÍR	Egilshöll	5–1	Gary Martin 8' 30' Ástbjörn Þ. 39' M. Præst 54' Pálmi Rafn 66'

=== Fótbolti.net Cup ===
KR took part in the 2016 Fótbolti.net Tournament, a pre-season tournament held in January each year.

The team played in Group A along with ÍA, FH and Þróttur R. KR finished top of the group with 9 points and went through to the final.

KR played ÍBV in the final and lost the match 1–2 with Guðmundur Andri scoring KR's only goal.

Date	Round	Opponents	Stadium	Result F–A	Scorers
8 January 2016	Group stage	FH	Fífan	2–1	Gary Martin 77' Almarr O. 90'
12 January 2016	Group stage	Þróttur R.	Egilshöll	2–0	Guðmundur Andri 8' 64'
23 January 2016	Group stage	ÍA	Akraneshöllin	4–2	Pámi Rafn 23' Almarr O. 26' Óskar Örn 45' Guðmundur Andri 91'
1 February 2016	Final	ÍBV	Egilshöll	1–2	Guðmundur Andri 79'

== Lengjubikarinn ==
KR played in the Icelandic league cup, Lengjubikarinn. They were drawn in Group 3 along with ÍA, Víkingur R., Haukar, HK and Grindavík. KR finished second in the group behind Víkingur R. with 10 points and went through to the quarter-finals.

In the quarter-finals KR played Fylkir who had topped group 2. After a goalless first half KR killed the game off with three goals in a span off 16 minutes in the second half. Morten Beck Andersen opened the scoring in the 50th minute with Óskar Örn doubling the lead in the 57th minute. Morten Beck Andersen then scored his second goal of the night making it 3–0 in the 66th minute.

KR played Keflavík in the semi-finals. KR maintained their good goal scoring form from the quarter-finals and won the game convincingly 4–0. Morten Beck Andersen again scored a brace with Hólmbert Aron and Indriði scoring one each.

On 21 April, KR won the Lengjubikarinn after a 2–0 win against Víkingur R. After a goalless first half Óskar Örn opened the scoring with a headed goal right after the break. He then doubled the scoring with a wonderful shot from his own half over Víkingur's goalkeeper. This was KR's 6th league cup.

=== Matches ===
Win Draw Loss Upcoming fixture

14 February 2016 Group stages	KR	1–1	Haukar	Reykjavík
18:15 GMT	Hólmbert Aron Friðjónsson 52'; Kjartan Franklín Magnús (yellow card) 79'	Report	Aron Jóhannsson 86' (pen.); Arnar Aðalgeirsson (red card) 58'; Gunnlaugur Fannar Guðmundsson (yellow card) 70'	Stadium: Egilshöll; Referee: Þorvaldur Árnason

4 March 2016 Group stages	HK	1–2	KR	Kópavogur
18:10 GMT	Eiður Gauti Sæbjörnsson 94'; Birkir Valur Jónsson (yellow card) 26'; Árni Arnarson (yellow card) 53'	Report	Hólmbert Aron Friðjónsson 6' 35'; Finnur Orri Margeirsson (yellow card) 73'	Stadium: Kórinn; Referee: Pétur Guðmundsson

17 March 2016 Group stages	KR	1–3	Víkingur R.	Reykjavík
19:00 GMT	Skúli Jón Friðgeirsson 47'; Finnur Orri Margeirsson (yellow card) 36'; Hólmbert Aron Friðjónsson (yellow card) 56'; Guðmundur Andri Tryggvason (yellow card) 90'	Report	Vladimir Tufegdzic 20' (yellow card) 54'; Gary Martin 57'; Stefán Þór Pálsson 73'; Alan Lowing (yellow card) 14'; Iain Williamson (yellow card) 65'	Stadium: Egilshöll; Referee: Aðalbjörn Heiðar Þorsteinsson

23 March 2016 Group stages	ÍA	0–4	KR	Akranes
19:00 GMT	Ólafur Valur Valdimarsson (yellow card) 33' (yellow card) 45' (red card)	Report	Hólmbert Aron Friðjónsson 30' (yellow card) 62'; Morten Beck 69'; Finnur Orri Margeirsson 74'; Morten Beck Andersen 86'; Gunnar Þór Gunnarsson (yellow card) 37'; Pálmi Rafn Pálmason (yellow card) 64'	Stadium: Akraneshöllin; Referee: Guðmundur Ársæll Guðmundsson

31 March 2016 Group stages	KR	3–0	Grindavík	Reykjavík
19:00 GMT	Finnur Orri Margeirsson 20' (yellow card) 54'; Óskar Örn Hauksson 85' (pen.); Pálmi Rafn Pálmason 90+2'; Morten Beck Andersen (yellow card) 90+2'	Report	Alexander Veigar Þórarinsson (yellow card) 29'; Úlfar Hrafn Pálsson (yellow card) 31'; Matthías Örn Friðriksson (yellow card) 38'; Björn Berg Bryde (yellow card) 75'	Stadium: Egilshöll; Referee: Aðalbjörn Heiðar Þorsteinsson

8 April 2016 Quarter-finals	Fylkir	0–3	KR	Reykjavík
18:00 GMT	Jose Enrique Seoane Vergara (yellow card) 32'; Emil Ásmundsson (yellow card) 45+1'; Tómas Þorsteinsson (yellow card) 90+2'	Report	Morten Beck Andersen 50' 66'; Óskar Örn Hauksson 56'	Stadium: Valsvöllur; Referee: Guðmundur Ársæll Guðmundsson

15 April 2016 Semi-finals	KR	4–0	Keflavík	Reykjavík
19:00 GMT	Morten Beck Andersen 44' 45'; Hólmbert Aron Friðjónsson 62'; Indriði Sigurðsson 90'	Report		Stadium: Egilshöll; Referee: Þóroddur Hjaltalín

21 April 2016 Final	Víkingur R.	0–2	KR	Reykjavík
19:15 GMT	Arnþór Ingi Kristinsson (yellow card) 26'	Report	Óskar Örn Hauksson 46' 56'; Valtýr Már Michaelsson (yellow card) 32'; Finnur Orri Margeirsson (yellow card) 37'; Indriði Sigurðsson (yellow card) 83'	Stadium: Egilshöll; Referee: Pétur Guðmundsson

== Úrvalsdeild ==
=== League table ===
Pos	Team	Pld	W	D	L	GF	GA	GD	Pts	Qualification or relegation
1	FH (C)	22	12	7	3	32	17	+15	43	Qualification for the Champions League second qualifying round
2	Stjarnan	22	12	3	7	43	31	+12	39	Qualification for the Europa League first qualifying round
3	KR	22	11	5	6	29	20	+9	38	Qualification for the Europa League first qualifying round
4	Fjölnir	22	11	4	7	42	25	+17	37	
5	Valur	22	10	5	7	41	28	+13	35	Qualification for the Europa League first qualifying round (Note: Valur qualified for the Europa League first qualifying round by winning the 2016 Icelandic Cup.)

Source: KSÍ (in Icelandic), Soccerway
Rules for classification: 1) Points; 2) Goal difference; 3) Goals scored; 4) Head-to-head points; 5) Head-to-head goal difference; 6) Head-to-head goals scored; 7) Head-to-head away goals scored; 8) Play-off (only for deciding champion); 9) Draw.
(C) Champions

=== Matches ===
Win Draw Loss Upcoming fixture

2 May 2016 1	KR	0–0	Víkingur R.	Reykjavík
19:15 GMT	Denis Fazlagic (yellow card) 9'	Report	Viktor Jónsson (yellow card) 11'	Stadium: Alvogenvöllurinn; Attendance: 1895; Referee: Þóroddur Hjaltalín

8 May 2016 2	Þróttur R.	2–2	KR	Reykjavík
19:15 GMT	Dion Jeremy Acoff 17'; Emil Atlason 71'; Tonny Mawejje (yellow card) 52'	Report	Óskar Örn Hauksson 45+1' (pen.); Kennie Chopart 80'; Denis Fazlagic (yellow card) 87'	Stadium: Þróttarvöllur; Attendance: 1060; Referee: Guðmundur Ársæll Guðmundsson

12 May 2016 3	KR	1–0	FH	Reykjavík
20:00 GMT	Pálmi Rafn Pálmason 65'; Michael Præst (yellow card) 54'; Gunnar Þór Gunnarsson (yellow card) 56'	Report	Bergsveinn Ólafsson (yellow card) 27'; Emil Pálsson (yellow card) 52'; Davíð Þór Viðarsson (yellow card) 56'; Kristján Flóki Finnbogason (yellow card) 58'; Jonathan Hendrickx (yellow card) 90+8'	Stadium: Alvogenvöllurinn; Referee: Pétur Guðmundsson

17 May 2016 4	KR	1–1	Stjarnan	Reykjavík
20:00 GMT	Indriði Sigurðsson 51'; Skúli Jón Friðgeirsson (yellow card) 48'; Michael Præst (yellow card) 54'	Report	Baldur Sigurðsson 5' (yellow card) 44'; Heiðar Ægisson (yellow card) 34'; Daníel Laxdal (yellow card) 45+1'; Halldór Orri Björnsson (yellow card) 50'	Stadium: Alvogenvöllurinn; Referee: Þóroddur Hjaltalín

22 May 2016 5	Breiðablik	1–0	KR	Kópavogur
20:00 GMT	Höskuldur Gunnlaugsson 35'; Oliver Sigurjónsson (yellow card) 58'	Report	Kennie Chopart (yellow card) 59'	Stadium: Kópavogsvöllur; Attendance: 1819; Referee: Ívar Orri Kristjánsson

29 May 2016 6	KR	2–1	Valur	Reykjavík
20:00 GMT	Óskar Örn Hauksson 35'; Denis Fazlagic 48'; Indriði Sigurðsson (yellow card) 71'	Report	Haukur Páll Sigurðsson 90+1' (yellow card) 53'; Bjarni Ólafur Eiríksson (yellow card) 34'; Kristinn Freyr Sigurðsson (yellow card) 59'	Stadium: Alvogenvöllurinn; Attendance: 1659; Referee: Þorvaldur Árnason

4 June 2016 7	ÍBV	v	KR	Vestmannaeyjar
16:00 GMT				Stadium: Hásteinsvöllur

23 June 2016 8	KR	v	ÍA	Reykjavík
19:15 GMT				Stadium: Alvogenvöllurinn

15 June 2016 9	Fjölnir	v	KR	Reykjavík
19:15 GMT				Stadium: Fjölnisvöllur

10 July 2016 10	KR	v	Víkingur Ó.	Reykjavík
16:00 GMT				Stadium: Alvogenvöllurinn

17 July 2016 11	Fylkir	v	KR	Reykjavík
19:15 GMT				Stadium: Floridana völlurinn

=== Results by matchday ===
Matchday	1	2	3	4	5	6	7	8	9	10	11	12	13	14	15	16	17	18	19	20	21	22
Ground	H	A	H	H	A	H	A	H	A	H	A	A	H	A	A	H	A	H	A	H	A	H
Result	D	D	W	D	L	W																
Position	6	7	6	5	8	7																

Updated to match(es) played on 29 May 2016. Source:
A = Away; H = Home; W = Win; D = Draw; L = Loss

=== Results ===
Overall								Home						Away					
Pld	W	D	L	GF	GA	GD	Pts	W	D	L	GF	GA	GD	W	D	L	GF	GA	GD
6	2	3	1	6	5	+1	9	2	2	0	4	2	+2	0	1	1	2	3	−1

Last updated: 29 May 2016.
Source: KSÍ

=== Points breakdown ===
- Points at home: 8
- Points away from home: 1
- 6 Points:
- 4 Points:
- 3 Points:
- 2 Points:
- 1 Point:
- 0 Points:

== Borgunarbikarinn ==
KR came into the Icelandic Cup, Borgunarbikarinn, in the 3rd round. The team was drawn against Selfoss who play in the 1. deild karla. KR lost the game 1–2 after extra-time. KR took the lead in the through Denis Fazlagic header on the 61st minute but Selfoss fought back and managed to equalise the game on the 72nd minute. KR had plenty of possession and created many chances but did not manage to find the winning goal so the game went to extra time were Selfoss scored the only goal on the 116th minute and went through to the 4th round, round of 16. This was the first time that KR had been defeated in the 3rd round of the Icelandic Cup.

=== Matches ===
25 May 2016 Round of 32	KR	1–2 (a.e.t.)	Selfoss	Reykjavík
19:15 GMT	Denis Fazlagic 61'; Hólmbert Aron Friðjónsson (yellow card) 73'; Atli Hrafn Andrason (yellow card) 90+1'; Pálmi Rafn Pálmason (yellow card) 108'	Report	James Mack 71'; Arnar Logi Sveinsson 116'; Giordano Pantano (yellow card) 56'; Ivan Martinez Gutierrez (yellow card) 63'; Haukur Ingi Gunnarsson (yellow card) 76'; Svavar Berg Jóhannsson (yellow card) 86'; Jose Teodoro Tirado Garcia (yellow card) 115'	Stadium: Alvogenvöllurinn; Attendance: 450; Referee: Sigurður Óli Þórleifsson

== Squad statistics ==
=== Goalscorers ===
Includes all competitive matches.

As of match played 29 May 2016

Rank	Pos.	No.	Player	Úrvalsdeild	Borgunarbikar	Lengjubikar	Europe	Total
1	MF	22	(Iceland) Óskar Örn Hauksson	2	0	4	0	6
2	FW	11	(Denmark) Morten Beck Andersen	0	0	5	0	5
3	FW	9	(Iceland) Hólmbert Aron Friðjónsson	0	0	5	0	5
4	MF	10	(Iceland) Pálmi Rafn Pálmason	1	0	1	0	2
5	MF	8	(Iceland) Finnur Orri Margeirsson	0	0	2	0	2
6	DF	16	(Iceland) Indriði Sigurðsson	1	0	1	0	2
7	MF	20	(Denmark) Denis Fazlagic	1	1	0	0	2
8	DF	2	(Denmark) Morten Beck	0	0	1	0	1
9	DF	7	(Iceland) Skúli Jón Friðgeirsson	0	0	1	0	1
10	FW	17	(Denmark) Kennie Chopart	1	0	0	0	1

=== Goalkeeping ===
Includes all competitive matches.

As of match played 29 May 2016

Pos.	No.	Player	Games Played	Clean Sheets (%)	Goals Against
GK	1	(Iceland) Stefán Logi Magnússon	14	7 (50%)	11
GK	13	(Iceland) Sindri Snær Jensson	2	0 (0%)	1

=== Appearances ===
Includes all competitive matches. Numbers in parentheses are sub-appearances.

As of match played 29 May 2016

No.	Pos.	Player	Úrvalsdeild	Borgunarbikar	Lengjubikar	Europe	Total
1	GK	(Iceland) Stefán Logi Magnússon	6	1	6 (1)	0	14
2	DF	(Denmark) Morten Beck	6	1	5	0	12
3	DF	(Iceland) Ástbjörn Þórðarson	0	0	1 (1)	0	2
4	MF	(Denmark) Michael Præst	5 (1)	0	3 (2)	0	11
6	DF	(Iceland) Gunnar Þór Gunnarsson	6	0	7	0	13
7	DF	(Iceland) Skúli Jón Friðgeirsson	6	1	8	0	15
8	MF	(Iceland) Finnur Orri Margeirsson	4 (1)	1	6	0	12
9	FW	(Iceland) Hólmbert Aron Friðjónsson	4 (1)	1	8	0	14
10	MF	(Iceland) Pálmi Rafn Pálmason	4	1	6	0	11
11	FW	(Denmark) Morten Beck Andersen	3 (3)	1	5 (2)	0	14
13	GK	(Iceland) Sindri Snær Jensson	0	0	2	0	2
16	DF	(Iceland) Indriði Sigurðsson	6	1	7	0	14
17	FW	(Denmark) Kennie Chopart	3 (2)	(1)	5	0	11
18	DF	(Iceland) Aron Bjarki Jósepsson	(1)	1	4 (4)	0	10
20	MF	(Denmark) Denis Fazlagic	4 (2)	1	1	0	8
21	MF	(Iceland) Atli Hrafn Andrason	1 (2)	(1)	1 (1)	0	6
22	MF	(Iceland) Óskar Örn Hauksson	6	1	8	0	15
23	FW	(Iceland) Guðmundur Andri Tryggvason	0	0	(1)	0	1
24	MF	(Iceland) Valtýr Már Michaelsson	2	0	3 (3)	0	8
28	MF	(Iceland) Óliver Dagur Thorlacius	0	0	(5)	0	5
30	FW	(Iceland) Axel Sigurðarson	(1)	0	1 (7)	0	9
	DF	(Iceland) Kjartan Franklín Magnús	0	0	1	0	1
	MF	(Iceland) Júlí Karlsson	0	0	(2)	0	2
	DF	(Iceland) Leifur Þorbjarnarson	0	0	(1)	0	1

=== Disciplinary ===
Includes all competitive matches.

As of match played 29 May 2016

No.	Pos.	Player	Yellow card	Second yellow card	Red card
4	MF	(Iceland) Michael Præst	2	0	0
6	DF	(Iceland) Gunnar Þór Gunnarsson	2	0	0
7	DF	(Iceland) Skúli Jón Friðgeirsson	1	0	0
8	MF	(Iceland) Finnur Orri Margeirsson	4	0	0
9	FW	(Iceland) Hólmbert Aron Friðjónsson	3	0	0
10	MF	(Iceland) Pálmi Rafn Pálmason	2	0	0
11	FW	(Denmark) Morten Beck Andersen	1	0	0
16	DF	(Iceland) Indriði Sigurðsson	2	0	0
17	FW	(Denmark) Kennie Chopart	1	0	0
20	MF	(Denmark) Denis Fazlagic	2	0	0
21	MF	(Iceland) Atli Hrafn Andrason	1	0	0
23	FW	(Iceland) Guðmundur Andri Tryggvason	1	0	0
24	MF	(Iceland) Valtýr Már Michaelsson	2	0	0
	DF	(Iceland) Kjartan Franklín Magnús	1	0	0

=== Squad Stats ===
Includes all competitive matches; Úrvalsdeild, Borgunarbikar, Lengjubikar and Europa League.

	Úrvalsdeild	Borgunarbikar	Lengjubikar	Europa League	Total
Games played	6	1	8	0	15
Games won	2	0	6	0	8 (50%)
Games drawn	3	0	1	0	4 (29%)
Games lost	1	1	1	0	3 (21%)
Goals scored	6	1	20	0	27
Goals conceded	5	2	5	0	12
Clean sheets	2	0	5	0	7
Yellow cards	8	3	13	0	24
Red cards	0	0	0	0	0

Last updated: 29 May 2016
