= 2015 Knattspyrnufélag Reykjavíkur season =

Knattspyrnufélag Reykjavíkur (KR)
2015 season
- Manager: Bjarni Guðjónsson
- Stadium: KR-völlur
- Úrvalsdeild: 3rd
- Borgunarbikarinn: Runner up
- Lengjubikarinn: Group Stage
- Europa League: 2nd Qualify. Round
- Meistarakeppni KSÍ: 2nd
- Top goalscorer: League: 8 Óskar Örn Hauksson; All: 13; Óskar Örn Hauksson
Home colours	Away colours

The 2015 season was KR's 101st season in Úrvalsdeild and their 37th consecutive season in top-flight of Icelandic Football.

Along with the Úrvalsdeild, the club also competed in the Meistarakeppni KSÍ, the Lengjubikarinn, the Borgunarbikarinn and the 2015–16 UEFA Europa League where they entered in the first qualifying round.

Former KR player and captain Bjarni Guðjónsson head coached the team for the first time after being appointed on 28 October 2014. This was Bjarni's second season as a head coach of a team in the top-flight, having been relegated from the 2014 Úrvalsdeild with Fram. Bjarni was assisted by Guðmundur Benediktsson, also a former KR player. Guðmundur head coached Breiðablik in the 2014 season.

== First Team ==
=== Current squad ===
As of 16 July 2015. These players competed in Úrvalsdeild, Borgunarbikarinn, Lengjubikarinn, Meistarakeppni KSÍ, Europa League

Note: Flags indicate national team as defined under FIFA eligibility rules; some limited exceptions apply. Players may hold more than one non-FIFA nationality.

No.	Pos.	Nation	Player
1	GK	ISL	Stefán Logi Magnússon
2	DF	ISL	Grétar Sigfinnur Sigurðarson
3	DF	DEN	Rasmus Christiansen
4	DF	URU	Gonzalo Balbi Lorenzo
5	DF	ISL	Skúli Jón Friðgeirsson (Vice-captain)
6	DF	ISL	Gunnar Þór Gunnarsson
7	FW	ENG	Gary Martin
8	MF	ISL	Jónas Guðni Sævarsson
9	FW	ISL	Þorsteinn Már Ragnarsson
10	MF	ISL	Pálmi Rafn Pálmason (Captain)
11	MF	ISL	Almarr Ormarsson
12	GK	ISL	Hörður Fannar Björgvinsson

No.	Pos.	Nation	Player
13	GK	ISL	Sindri Snær Jensson
16	MF	ISL	Kristinn Jóhannes Magnússon
17	FW	ISL	Hólmbert Aron Friðjónsson
18	DF	ISL	Aron Bjarki Jóspesson
19	FW	DEN	Søren Frederiksen
20	MF	DEN	Jacob Schoop
22	MF	ISL	Óskar Örn Hauksson
27	MF	ISL	Guðmundur Andri Tryggvason
28	MF	ISL	Atli Hrafn Andrason
29	MF	ISL	Júlí Karlsson
30	FW	ISL	Axel Sigurðarson
—	DF	ISL	Leifur Þorbjarnarson

== Transfers and loans ==
=== Transfers in ===
Date	Position	No.	Player	From club	Other	Ref
16 October 2014	FW	9	(Iceland) Þorsteinn Már Ragnarsson	(Iceland) Víkingur Ó	Back from loan	
16 October 2014	MF		(Iceland) Viðar Þór Sigurðsson	(Iceland) KV	Back from Loan	
16 October 2014	MF		(Iceland) Leifur Þorbjarnarson	(Iceland) KV	Back from Loan	
6 November 2014	GK	12	(Iceland) Hörður Fannar Björgvinsson	(Iceland) Fram		
6 December 2014	MF	10	(Iceland) Pálmi Rafn Pálmason	(Iceland) Lillestrøm SK		
16 January 2015	FW	19	(Denmark) Søren Frederiksen	(Denmark) AaB		
11 February 2015	DF	3	(Denmark) Rasmus Christiansen	(Norway) Ull/Kisa		
17 February 2015	DF	5	(Iceland) Skúli Jón Friðgeirsson	(Sweden) Gefle IF		
21 February 2015	MF	16	(Iceland) Kristinn Jóhannes Magnússon	(Iceland) Víkingur R		
14 April 2015	MF	20	(Denmark) Jacob Schoop	(Denmark) Odense Boldklub		
24 April 2015	MF	22	(Iceland) Óskar Örn Hauksson	(Canada) FC Edmonton	Back from Loan	
15 July 2015	FW	17	(Iceland) Hólmbert Aron Friðjónsson	(Scotland) Celtic		

=== Transfers out ===
Date	Position	No.	Player	To club	Other	Ref
21 October 2014	MF		(Iceland) Torfi Karl Ólafsson	(Iceland) Víkingur Ó		
18 November 2014	MF	8	(Iceland) Baldur Sigurðsson	(Denmark) SønderjyskE		
24 November 2014	DF	3	(Iceland) Haukur Heiðar Hauksson	(Sweden) AIK		
8 May 2015	MF	24	(Togo) Farid Zato	Released		
14 May 2015	MF	23	(Iceland) Atli Sigurjónsson	(Iceland) Breiðablik		
21 July 2015	FW		(Iceland) Emil Atlason	(Iceland) Valur		

=== Loans out ===
Start Date	End Date	Position	No.	Player	To Club	Ref
15 January 2015	24 April 2015	MF	11	(Iceland) Óskar Örn Hauksson	(Canada) FC Edmonton	
2 February 2015	21 July 2015	FW	15	(Iceland) Emil Atlason	(Iceland) Preussen Münster	
10 February 2015	16 October 2015	MF	5	(Iceland) Egill Jónsson	(Iceland) Víkingur Ó	
20 February 2015	16 October 2015	DF	21	(Iceland) Guðmundur Reynir Gunnarsson	(Iceland) Víkingur Ó	
6 March 2015	16 October 2015	FW		(Iceland) Kristófer Eggertsson	(Iceland) Víkingur Ó	
14 March 2015	14 April 2015	GK	12	(Iceland) Hörður Fannar Björgvinsson	(Iceland) BÍ/Bolungarvík	
7 May 2015	16 October 2015	MF	26	(Iceland) Björn Þorláksson	(Iceland) Grótta	
8 May 2015	16 October 2015	FW		(Iceland) Viðar Þór Sigurðsson	(Iceland) Fjarðabyggð	

== Preseason ==
=== Reykjavík Cup ===
KR took part in the 2015 Reykjavík Cup, a pre-season tournament for clubs from Reykjavík.

The team played in Group A along with Fjölnir, Fram and Fylkir. KR won their first two games against Fylkir and Fram but lost the third games against Fjölnir and finished second in the group with 6 points.

In the semi-finals KR lost to Leiknir R on penalties after the game had ended 2–2 with Leiknir R scoring the equaliser in the 90th minute.

Date	Round	Opponents	Stadium	Result F–A	Scorers
16 January 2015	Group stage	Fylkir	Egilshöll	2–1	Almarr 63' Gunnar Þór 83'
22 January 2015	Group stage	Fram	Egilshöll	2–0	Kristinn Jóhannes 15' Guðmundur Andri 70'
29 January 2015	Group stage	Fjölnir	Egilshöll	1–2	Gunnar Þór 17'
5 February 2015	Semi-finals	Leiknir R	Egilshöll	2–2 (4–2)	Aron Bjarki 21' Almarr 50'

== Lengjubikarinn ==
KR played in the Icelandic league cup, Lengjubikarinn. They were drawn in Group 2 along with Leiknir R, Víkingur R, Fjölnir, KA, Selfoss, Grótta and Fram. KR lost their first two games, 3–4 against Víkingur R and 0–1 against Fjölnir. In the third round KR recorded their first win, 1–0 against Fram, with Þorsteinn Már scoring the winning goal. KR than defeated Leiknir R 2–1 in the fourth round and draw against KA 2–2 in the fifth. On 26 March, the sixth round, KR won their neighbours in Grótta 4–0. In the seventh round KR drew against Selfoss 1–1 and lost their chance to go second. As Leiknir R had announced they would not compete in the quarter-finals KR were handed their place in the finals.

On 13 April KR withdrew their team from the competition, handing the spot over to KA.

Date	Round	Opponents	Stadium	Result F–A	Scorers
15 February 2015	Group stage	Víkingur R	Egilshöll	3–4	Atli Hrafn 33' Almarr 35' Aron Bjarki 45'
21 February 2015	Group stage	Fjölnir	Egilshöll	0–1	
6 March 2015	Group stage	Fram	Egilshöll	1–0	Þorsteinn Már 21'
13 March 2015	Group stage	Leiknir R	Egilshöll	2–1	Gary Martin 85' Þorsteinn Már 88'
22 March 2015	Group stage	KA	KA-völlur	2–2	Þorsteinn Már 45' Gary Martin 67'
26 March 2015	Group stage	Grótta	Vivaldivöllurinn	4–0	Almarr 4' Søren 36' Aron Bjarki 43' Þorsteinn Már 77'
9 April 2015	Group stage	Selfoss	JÁVERK-völlurinn	1–1	Gary Martin 37'

== Meistarakeppni KSÍ ==
KR played 2014 league champions Stjarnan in the Meistarakeppni KSÍ, an annual match contested between the champions of the previous Úrvalsdeild season and the holders of the Borgunarbikarinn on 27 April 2015.

KR lost the game 1–0 with the winning goal coming in the 82nd minute.

Date	Round	Opponents	Stadium	Result F–A	Scorers
27 April 2015	Final	Stjarnan	Kórinn	0–1	

== Úrvalsdeild ==
=== League table ===
Pos	Team	Pld	W	D	L	GF	GA	GD	Pts	Qualification or relegation
1	FH (C)	22	15	3	4	47	26	+21	48	Qualification for the Champions League second qualifying round
2	Breiðablik	22	13	7	2	34	13	+21	46	Qualification for the Europa League first qualifying round
3	KR	22	12	6	4	36	21	+15	42	Qualification for the Europa League first qualifying round
4	Stjarnan	22	9	6	7	32	24	+8	33	
5	Valur	22	9	6	7	38	31	+7	33	Qualification for the Europa League first qualifying round (Note: Valur qualified for the UEFA Europa League first qualifying round by winning the 2015 Icelandic Cup.)

Source: KSÍ, Soccerway
Rules for classification: 1) Points; 2) Goal difference; 3) Goals scored; 4) Head-to-head points; 5) Head-to-head goal difference; 6) Head-to-head goals scored; 7) Head-to-head away goals scored; 8) Play-off (only for deciding champion); 9) Draw.
(C) Champions

=== Matches ===
Win Draw Loss Upcoming fixture

4 May 2015 1	KR	1–3	FH	Reykjavík
19:15 GMT	Jacob Schoop 50'; Pálmi Rafn Pálmason (yellow card) 37'; Gonzalo Balbi Lorenzo (yellow card) 39'; Skúli Jón Friðgeirsson (yellow card) 45'	Report	Kristján Flóki Finnbogason 73' (yellow card) 89'; Atli Guðnason 85' 90'; Sam Hewson (yellow card) 26'; Bjarni Þór Viðarsson (yellow card) 31'	Stadium: KR-völlur; Attendance: 2558; Referee: Garðar Örn Hinriksson

11 May 2015 2	Breiðablik	2–2	KR	Kópavogur
19:15 GMT	Höskuldur Gunnlaugsson 10'; Guðjón Pétur Lýðsson 71' (yellow card) 86'; Damir Muminovic (yellow card) 65'	Report	Søren Frederiksen 70'; Óskar Örn Hauksson 45+1'; Gonzalo Balbi Lorenzo (yellow card) 85'	Stadium: Kópavogsvöllur; Attendance: 1945; Referee: Valgeir Valgeirsson

17 May 2015 3	KR	2–0	Fjölnir	Reykjavík
20:00 GMT	Gary Martin 8' (pen.); Pálmi Rafn Pálmason 61'; Rasmus Christiansen (yellow card) 60'	Report	Ólafur Páll Snorrason (yellow card) 38'; Emil Pálsson (yellow card) 40'; Viðar Ari Jónsson (yellow card) 71'; Arnór Eyvar Ólafsson (yellow card) 75' (yellow-red card) 89'	Stadium: KR-völlur; Attendance: 1345; Referee: Valdimar Pálsson

20 May 2015 4	Fylkir	1–3	KR	Reykjavík
20:00 GMT	Albert Brynjar Ingason 22' (yellow card) 81'; Daði Ólafsson (yellow card) 9'; Andrés Már Jóhannesson (yellow card) 73'; Elís Rafn Björnsson (yellow card) 87'	Report	Søren Frederiksen 6' (yellow card) 63'; Skúli Jón Friðgeirsson 35'; Þorsteinn Már Ragnarsson 90'; Gonzalo Balbi Lorenzo (yellow card) 77'	Stadium: Fylkisvöllur; Referee: Þóroddur Hjaltalín

25 May 2015 5	KR	1–0	ÍBV	Reykjavík
17:00 GMT	Óskar Örn Hauksson 79'	Report	Víðir Þorvarðarson (yellow card) 26'; Avni Pepa (yellow card) 60'; Hafsteinn Briem (yellow card) 60'; Bjarni Gunnarsson (yellow card) 71'	Stadium: KR-völlur; Attendance: 1455; Referee: Gunnar Jarl Jónsson

31 May 2015 6	KR	4–0	Keflavík	Reykjavík
19:15 GMT	Þorsteinn Már Ragnarsson 20'; Óskar Örn Hauksson 56' (pen.) 76'; Skúli Jón Friðgeirsson 78'	Report	Guðjón Árni Antoníusson (yellow card) 1'; Samuel Jimenez Hernandez (yellow card) 33'; Einar Orri Einarsson (yellow card) 55'	Stadium: KR-völlur; Attendance: 1412; Referee: Erlendur Eiríksson

7 June 2015 7	Valur	3–0	KR	Reykjavík
19:15 GMT	Patrick Pedersen 6' (pen.) 52' (yellow card) 86'; Haukur Ásberg Hilmarsson 93'; Haukur Páll Sigurðsson (yellow card) 17'; Bjarni Ólafur Eiríksson (yellow card) 53'; Kristinn Freyr Sigurðsson (yellow card) 59'; Ingvar Þór Kale (yellow card) 73'	Report	Aron Bjarki Jósepsson (yellow card) 32'; Jacob Schoop (yellow card) 73'; Pálmi Rafn Pálmason (yellow card) 73'	Stadium: Vodafonevöllurinn; Attendance: 1621; Referee: Þóroddur Hjaltalín

15 June 2015 8	KR	1–1	ÍA	Reykjavík
19:15 GMT	Almarr Ormarsson 61'; Kristinn Jóhannes Magnússon (yellow card) 53'; Gunnar Þór Gunnarsson (yellow card) 76'; Grétar Sigfinnur Sigurðarson (yellow card) 92'	Report	Ásgeir Marteinsson 44' (yellow card) 38'; Darren Lough (yellow card) 34'; Jón Vilhelm Ákason (yellow card) 77'	Stadium: KR-völlur; Attendance: 1477; Referee: Þorvaldur Árnason

22 June 2015 9	Stjarnan	0–1	KR	Garðabær
20:00 GMT	Brynjar Gauti Guðjónsson (yellow card) 40'; Pablo Punyed (yellow card) 54'; Michael Præst (yellow card) 55'; Ólafur Karl Finsen (yellow card) 71'; Gunnar Nielsen (red card) 76'; Arnar Már Björgvinsson (yellow card) 79'	Report	Almarr Ormarsson 68'; Pálmi Rafn Pálmason (yellow card) 83'	Stadium: Samsungvöllurinn; Attendance: 1337; Referee: Erlendur Eiríksson

28 June 2015 10	KR	1–0	Leiknir R	Reykjavík
19:15 GMT	Þorsteinn Már Ragnarsson 74'; Rasmus Christiansen (yellow card) 26'	Report	Fannar Þór Arnarsson (yellow card) 23'; Atli Arnarsson (yellow card) 77'; Eiríkur Ingi Magnússon (yellow card) 82'; Eyjólfur Tómasson (red card) 90'	Stadium: KR-völlur; Attendance: 1522; Referee: Valdimar Pálsson

12 July 2015 11	Víkingur R	0–3	KR	Reykjavík
19:15 GMT	Ívar Örn Jónsson (yellow card) 80'; Finnur Ólafsson (yellow card) 83'; Tómas Guðmundsson (yellow card) 87'; Hallgrímur Mar Steingrímsson (yellow card) 90'	Report	Þorsteinn Már Ragnarsson 11'; Søren Frederiksen 37' 40'	Stadium: Víkingsvöllur; Attendance: 1336; Referee: Garðar Örn Hinriksson

19 July 2015 12	FH	1–3	KR	Hafnarfjörður
20:00 GMT	Emil Pálsson 11'; Sam Tillen (yellow card) 24'; Guðmann Þórisson (yellow card) 48'; Kassim Doumbia (yellow card) 78'; Atli Viðar Björnsson (yellow card) 81'	Report	Hólmbert Aron Friðjónsson 56' (pen.); Gary Martin 58'; Óskar Örn Hauksson 68'; Jónas Guðni Sævarsson (yellow card) 19'; Rasmus Christiansen (yellow card) 48'; Gunnar Þór Gunnarsson (yellow card) 84'	Stadium: Kaplakrikavöllur; Attendance: 2435; Referee: Gunnar Jarl Jónsson

27 July 2015 13	KR	0–0	Breiðablik	Reykjavík
20:00 GMT	Þorsteinn Már Ragnarsson (yellow card) 32'	Report	Elfar Freyr Helgason (yellow card) 19'	Stadium: Alvogenvöllurinn; Attendance: 2250; Referee: Þorvaldur Árnason

5 August 2015 14	Fjölnir	2–1	KR	Reykjavík
19:15 GMT	Guðmundur Karl Guðmundsson 5'; Mark Charles Magee 77' (yellow card) 91'; Bergsveinn Ólafsson (yellow card) 39'; Jonatan Neftali Diez Gonzales (yellow card) 56'; Guðmundur Böðvar Guðjónsson (yellow card) 67'; Þórður Ingason (yellow card) 83'	Report	Hólmbert Aron Friðjónsson 57'; Skúli Jón Friðgeirsson (yellow card) 50'	Stadium: Fjölnisvöllur; Attendance: 1264; Referee: Erlendur Eiríksson

10 August 2015 15	KR	2–0	Fylkir	Reykjavík
19:15 GMT	Þorsteinn Már Ragnarsson 79'; Pálmi Rafn Pálmason 83'; Stefán Logi Magnússon (yellow card) 25'; Aron Bjarki Jósepsson (yellow card) 45+1'	Report	Ragnar Bragi Sveinsson (yellow card) 25'; Hákon Ingi Jónsson (yellow card) 48'; Tonci Radovnikovic (yellow card) 56'; Ásgeir Börkur Ásgeirsson (yellow card) 87'	Stadium: Alvogenvöllurinn; Attendance: 1501; Referee: Valdimar Pálsson

21 August 2015 16	ÍBV	1–1	KR	Vestmannaeyjar
18:00 GMT	Jose Enrique Seoane Vergara 41' (yellow card) 84'; Víðir Þorvarðarson (yellow card) 67'; Mees Siers (yellow card) 73'; Jonathan Patrick Barden (yellow card) 90+3'	Report	Gunnar Þór Gunnarsson 73' (yellow card) 78'; Grétar Sigfinnur Sigurðarson (yellow card) 39'; Hólmbert Aron Friðjónsson (yellow card) 76'; Almarr Ormarsson (yellow card) 80'	Stadium: Hásteinsvöllur; Attendance: 509; Referee: Pétur Guðmundsson

25 August 2015 17	Keflavík	0–1	KR	Keflavík
18:00 GMT	Einar Orri Einarsson (yellow card) 45'	Report	Pálmi Rafn Pálmason 71' (yellow card) 58'; Søren Frederiksen (yellow card) 63'	Stadium: Nettóvöllurinn; Attendance: 850; Referee: Þóroddur Hjaltalín

30 August 2015 18	KR	2–2	Valur	Reykjavík
18:00 GMT	Own goal 32'; Almarr Ormarsson 90'; Aron Bjarki Jósepsson (yellow card) 60' (yellow card) 88' (red card); Gunnar Þór Gunnarsson (yellow card) 76'	Report	Kristinn Ingi Halldórsson 1' (yellow card) 90+3'; Sigurður Egill Lárusson 52'; Haukur Páll Sigurðsson (yellow card) 23'; Kristinn Freyr Sigurðsson (yellow card) 54'; Andri Fannar Stefánsson (yellow card) 79'	Stadium: Alvogenvöllurinn; Attendance: 1255; Referee: Garðar Örn Hinriksson

13 September 2015 19	ÍA	0–0	KR	Akranes
17:00 GMT	Ásgeir Marteinsson (yellow card) 75'	Report	Rasmus Steenberg Christiansen (yellow card) 19'; Gonzalo Balbi Lorenzo (yellow card) 90+4'	Stadium: Norðurálsvöllurinn; Attendance: 976; Referee: Garðar Örn Hinriksson

20 September 2015 20	KR	0–3	Stjarnan	Reykjavík
16:00 GMT	Stefán Logi Magnússon (red card) 29'; Hólmbert Aron Friðjónsson (yellow card) 52'; Søren Frederiksen (yellow card) 76'	Report	Veigar Páll Gunnarsson 30' (pen.) (yellow card) 35'; Guðjón Baldvinsson 46' (yellow card) 79'; Pablo Punyed 78'; Halldór Orri Björnsson (yellow card) 36'; Þórhallur Kári Knútsson (yellow card) 49'; Brynjar Gauti Guðjónsson (yellow card) 51'; Michael Præst (yellow card) 52'	Stadium: Alvogenvöllurinn; Attendance: 515; Referee: Valgeir Valgeirsson

26 September 2015 21	Leiknir R.	0–2	KR	Reykjavík
14:00 GMT	Eiríkur Ingi Magnússon (yellow card) 43' (yellow card) 78' (red card); Brynjar Hlöðversson (yellow card) 45+2'	Report	Óskar Örn Hauksson 56'; Gary Martin 62'	Stadium: Leiknisvöllur; Attendance: 314; Referee: Þorvaldur Árnason

3 October 2015 22	KR	5–2	Víkingur R.	Reykjavík
14:00 GMT	Óskar Örn Hauksson 5' 53'; Hólmbert Aron Friðjónsson 6'; Gary Martin 38' 60'; Gonzalo Balbi Lorenzo (yellow card) 67'	Report	Haukur Baldvinsson 46' (yellow card) 63'; Erlingur Agnarsson 45+3'; Arnþór Ingi Kristinsson (yellow card) 26'; Davíð Örn Atlason (yellow card) 28'	Stadium: Alvogenvöllurinn; Attendance: 344; Referee: Leiknir Ágústsson

=== Results ===
Overall								Home						Away					
Pld	W	D	L	GF	GA	GD	Pts	W	D	L	GF	GA	GD	W	D	L	GF	GA	GD
22	12	6	4	36	21	+15	42	6	3	1	19	8	+11	6	3	3	17	13	+4

Last updated: 26 September 2015.
Source: KSÍ

=== Points breakdown ===
- Points at home: 21
- Points away from home: 21
- 6 Points: Fylkir, Keflavík, Leiknir R., Víkingur R.
- 4 Points: ÍBV
- 3 Points: FH, Fjölnir, Stjarnan
- 2 Points: Breiðablik, ÍA
- 1 Point: Valur
- 0 Points:

== Borgunarbikarinn ==
KR came into the Icelandic cup, Borgunarbikarinn, in the 32nd-finals and were drawn against Keflavík. KR won the game comfortably 0–5.

In the 16th-finals the team was drawn against KV. KR won the game 7–1. Pálmi Rafn scored his first hat trick for the club.

KR won FH in the quarter-finals 2–1 at home. Gary Martin scored the winning goal on the 61st minute after Kassim Doumbia had equalised following Óskar Örn's goal.

In the semi-finals KR won an easy victory against ÍBV 4–1, having controlled the game from the first minute. Hólmbert Aron scored two of the four goals.

KR played Valur in the cup final and lost 2–0. Valur dominated the game and broke the deadlock on the 71st minute with a goal from Bjarni Ólafur. Kristinn Ingi doubled the lead for Valur on the 87th minute. KR played below par and had few chances in the game.

Win Draw Loss Upcoming fixture

3 June 2015 32nd-finals	Keflavík	0–5	KR	Keflavík
19:15 GMT	Unnar Már Unnarsson (red card) 44'	Report	Grétar Sigfinnur Sigurðarson 15'; Almarr Ormarsson 42'; Þorsteinn Már Ragnarsson 60'; Søren Frederiksen 67'; Guðmundur Andri Tryggvason 82'; Skúli Jón Friðgeirsson (yellow card) 18'	Stadium: Nettóvöllurinn; Attendance: 370; Referee: Þorvaldur Árnason

18 June 2015 16th-finals	KV	1–7	KR	Reykjavík
19:15 GMT	Jón Kári Ívarsson 83'	Report	Óskar Örn Hauksson 13' 54'; Pálmi Rafn Pálmason 26' 45' 64' (pen.); Almarr Ormarsson 33'; Jacob Schoop 35'	Stadium: Alvogenvöllurinn; Referee: Guðmundur Ársæll Guðmundsson

5 July 2015 Quarter finals	KR	2–1	FH	Reykjavík
20:00 GMT	Óskar Örn Hauksson 15'; Gary Martin 61'; Pálmi Rafn Pálmason (yellow card) 57'	Report	Kassim Doumbia 17' (yellow card) 89'; Davíð Þór Viðarsson (yellow card) 76'; Emil Pálsson (yellow card) 82'; Sam Tillen (yellow card) 91'	Stadium: Alvogenvöllurinn; Referee: Garðar Örn Hinriksson

30 July 2015 Semi finals	KR	4–1	ÍBV	Reykjavík
18:00 GMT	Hólmbert Aron Friðjónsson 23' 41'; Óskar Örn Hauksson 54'; Þorsteinn Már Ragnarsson 67'	Report	Bjarni Gunnarsson 70'; Ian Jeffs (yellow card) 24'; Hafsteinn Briem (yellow card) 40'; Víðir Þorvarðarson (yellow card) 58'; Jonathan Patrick Barden (yellow card) 90'	Stadium: Alvogenvöllurinn; Referee: Þóroddur Hjaltalín

15 August 2015 Final	Valur	2–0	KR	Reykjavík
16:00 GMT	Bjarni Ólafur Eiríksson 71'; Kristinn Ingi Halldórsson 87'; Thomas Guldborg Christensen (yellow card) 7'; Haukur Páll Sigurðsson (yellow card) 76'; Andri Fannar Stefánsson (yellow card) 77'	Report	Skúli Jón Friðgeirsson (yellow card) 68'; Þorsteinn Már Ragnarsson (yellow card) 90+4'	Stadium: Laugardalsvöllur; Attendance: 5751; Referee: Erlendur Eiríksson

== Europa League ==
KR came into the 2015–16 UEFA Europa League in the 1st qualifying round.

On 22 June KR was drawn against the Irish team Cork City F.C. The first leg ended 1–1 with Óskar Örn scoring KR's only goal and handing KR crucial away goal. KR won the second leg 2–1 after extra time. The team had gone behind and had a player sent off in the first half.

In the second qualifying round KR was drawn against Rosenborg. In the first leg Rosenborg controlled the play for most of the game and won the match 1–0 courtesy of a penalty goal from Pål André Helland. Hólmbert Aron played his first ever game for KR when he came on as a substitute on the 67th minute. In the second leg Rosenborg killed the tie in the first 18 minutes of the game scoring three goals and winning the tie 4–0.

=== First qualifying round ===
Win Draw Loss Upcoming fixture

2 July 2015 First leg	Cork City F.C. (Republic of Ireland)	1–1	(Iceland) KR	Cork City, Ireland
20:45 CET	Alan Bennett 19'; Colin Healy (yellow card) 53'; Mark O'Sullivan (yellow card) 83'	Report	Óskar Örn Hauksson 28' (yellow card) 36'; Aron Bjarki Jósepsson (yellow card) 83'; Pálmi Rafn Pálmason (yellow card) 87'	Stadium: Turner's Cross; Referee: (Denmark) Mads-Kristoffer Kristoffersen

9 July 2015 Second leg	KR (Iceland)	2–1 (a.e.t.) (3–2 agg.)	(Republic of Ireland) Cork City F.C.	Reykjavík, Iceland
21:15 CET	Pálmi Rafn Pálmason 75' (yellow card) 58'; Jacob Schoop 99'; Skúli Jón Friðgeirsson (yellow card) 33' (yellow card) 44' (red card); Aron Bjarki Jósepsson (yellow card) 35'; Gary Martin (yellow card) 90'; Þorsteinn Már Ragnarsson (yellow card) 102'	Report	Mark O'Sullivan 13' (yellow card) 104'; Alan Bennett (yellow card) 44'; Mark McNulty (yellow card) 102'; Colin Healy (yellow card) 102'; John O'Flynn (yellow card) 119'	Stadium: Alvogenvöllurinn; Referee: (Latvia) Aleksandrs Anufrijevs

=== Second qualifying round ===
Win Draw Loss Upcoming fixture

16 July 2015 First leg	KR (Iceland)	0–1	(Norway) Rosenborg	Reykjavík, Iceland
21:15 CET	Rasmus Christiansen (yellow card) 55'; Óskar Örn Hauksson (yellow card) 60'	Report	Pål André Helland 56'; Mike Jensen (yellow card) 83'; Riku Riski (yellow card) 83'	Stadium: Alvogenvöllurinn; Referee: (Hungary) Ádám Farkas

23 July 2015 Second leg	Rosenborg (Norway)	3–0 (4–0 agg.)	(Iceland) KR	Trondheim, Norway
19:00 CET	Fredrik Midtsjø 4'; Pål André Helland 7'; Alexander Søderlund 18'; Jonas Svensson (yellow card) 64'	Report	Gunnar Þór Gunnarsson (yellow card) 16'; Pálmi Rafn Pálmason (yellow card) 60'	Stadium: Lerkendal Stadion; Referee: (Greece) Athenasios Giachos

== Squad statistics ==
=== Goalscorers ===
Includes all competitive matches.

As of match played 3 October 2015

Rank	Pos.	No.	Player	Úrvalsdeild	Borgunarbikar	Lengjubikar	Meistarkeppni KSÍ	Europe	Total
1	MF	22	(Iceland) Óskar Örn Hauksson	8	4	0	0	1	13
2	FW	9	(Iceland) Þorsteinn Már Ragnarsson	5	2	4	0	0	11
3	FW	7	(England) Gary Martin	5	1	3	0	0	9
4	MF	10	(Iceland) Pálmi Rafn Pálmason	3	3	0	0	1	7
5	MF	11	(Iceland) Almarr Ormarsson	3	2	2	0	0	7
6	FW	19	(Denmark) Søren Frederiksen	4	1	1	0	0	6
7	FW	17	(Iceland) Hólmbert Aron Friðjónsson	3	2	0	0	0	5
8	MF	20	(Denmark) Jacob Schoop	1	1	0	0	1	3
9	DF	18	(Iceland) Aron Bjarki Jósepsson	0	0	2	0	0	2
10	DF	5	(Iceland) Skúli Jón Friðgeirsson	2	0	0	0	0	2
11	MF	28	(Iceland) Atli Hrafn Andrason	0	0	1	0	0	1
12	DF	2	(Iceland) Grétar Sigfinnur Sigurðarson	0	1	0	0	0	1
13	FW	27	(Iceland) Guðmundur Andri Tryggvason	0	1	0	0	0	1
14	DF	6	(Iceland) Gunnar Þór Gunnarsson	1	0	0	0	0	1

=== Appearances ===
Includes all competitive matches. Numbers in parentheses are sub-appearances.

As of match played 3 October 2015

No.	Pos.	Player	Úrvalsdeild	Borgunarbikar	Lengjubikar	Meistarkeppni KSÍ	Europe	Total
1	GK	(Iceland) Stefán Logi Magnússon	19	4	2	1	4	30
2	DF	(Iceland) Grétar Sigfinnur Sigurðarson	6 (5)	2	3 (4)	0	1 (2)	23
3	DF	(Denmark) Rasmus Christiansen	17	4	5	1	4	31
4	DF	(Uruguay) Gonzalo Balbi Lorenzo	10 (5)	2	6	1	1 (1)	26
5	DF	(Iceland) Skúli Jón Friðgeirsson	22	4	4	1	3	34
6	DF	(Iceland) Gunnar Þór Gunnarsson	20	5	5	1	4	35
7	FW	(England) Gary Martin	8 (7)	1 (2)	5 (2)	1	2 (2)	30
8	MF	(Iceland) Jónas Guðni Sævarsson	20	3	6	0	4	33
9	FW	(Iceland) Þorsteinn Már Ragnarsson	9 (10)	(5)	5 (1)	1	1 (2)	34
10	MF	(Iceland) Pálmi Rafn Pálmason	21	5	5	1	4	36
11	MF	(Iceland) Almarr Ormarsson	10 (12)	4 (1)	7	(1)	2 (2)	39
12	GK	(Iceland) Hörður Fannar Björgvinsson	0	0	1	0	0	1
13	GK	(Iceland) Sindri Snær Jensson	3 (1)	1	4	0	0	9
16	MF	(Iceland) Kristinn Jóhannes Magnússon	3 (7)	2 (1)	2 (4)	1	(1)	21
17	FW	(Iceland) Hólmbert Aron Friðjónsson	7 (3)	2	0	0	1 (1)	14
18	DF	(Iceland) Aron Bjarki Jósepsson	9 (3)	3	5	(1)	3 (1)	25
19	FW	(Denmark) Søren Frederiksen	18 (1)	3 (2)	4	1	3	32
20	MF	(Denmark) Jacob Schoop	21	5	0	1	3	30
22	MF	(Iceland) Óskar Örn Hauksson	19 (2)	5	0	(1)	4	31
26	MF	(Iceland) Björn Þorláksson	0	0	1 (2)	0	0	3
27	FW	(Iceland) Guðmundur Andri Tryggvason	(1)	(2)	2 (1)	0	0	6
28	MF	(Iceland) Atli Hrafn Andrason	(2)	(1)	2 (4)	0	0	9
29	MF	(Iceland) Júlí Karlsson	0	0	(1)	0	0	1
30	FW	(Iceland) Axel Sigurðarson	(2)	(1)	(1)	0	0	4
	DF	(Iceland) Leifur Þorbjarnarson	0	0	1 (2)	0	0	3
	FW	(Iceland) Viðar Þór Sigurðsson	0	0	(2)	0	0	2
	FW	(Iceland) Kristófer Eggertsson	0	0	2	0	0	2

=== Disciplinary record ===
Includes all competitive matches.

As of match played 3 October 2015

No.	Pos.	Player	Úrvalsdeild			Borgunarbikar			Lengjubikar			Meistarakeppni KSÍ			Europe			Total		
No.	Pos.	Player	Yellow card	Second yellow card	Red card	Yellow card	Second yellow card	Red card	Yellow card	Second yellow card	Red card	Yellow card	Second yellow card	Red card	Yellow card	Second yellow card	Red card	Yellow card	Second yellow card	Red card
1	GK	(Iceland) Stefán Logi Magnússon	1	0	1	0	0	0	0	0	0	0	0	0	0	0	0	1	0	1
2	DF	(Iceland) Grétar Sigfinnur Sigurðarson	2	0	0	0	0	0	2	0	0	0	0	0	0	0	0	4	0	0
3	DF	(Denmark) Rasmus Christiansen	4	0	0	0	0	0	0	0	0	1	0	0	1	0	0	6	0	0
4	DF	(Uruguay) Gonzalo Balbi	5	0	0	0	0	0	0	0	0	0	0	0	0	0	0	5	0	0
5	DF	(Iceland) Skúli Jón Friðgeirsson	2	0	0	2	0	0	0	0	0	0	0	0	1	1	0	5	1	0
6	DF	(Iceland) Gunnar Þór Gunnarsson	4	0	0	0	0	0	0	0	0	0	0	0	1	0	0	5	0	0
7	FW	(England) Gary Martin	0	0	0	0	0	0	0	0	0	0	0	0	1	0	0	1	0	0
8	MF	(Iceland) Jónas Guðni Sævarsson	1	0	0	0	0	0	1	0	0	0	0	0	0	0	0	2	0	0
9	FW	(Iceland) Þorsteinn Már Ragnarsson	1	0	0	1	0	0	1	0	0	0	0	0	1	0	0	4	0	0
10	MF	(Iceland) Pálmi Rafn Pálmason	4	0	0	1	0	0	0	0	0	0	0	0	3	0	0	8	0	0
11	MF	(Iceland) Almarr Ormarsson	1	0	0	0	0	0	1	0	0	0	0	0	0	0	0	2	0	0
16	MF	(Iceland) Kristinn Jóhannes Magnússon	1	0	0	0	0	0	0	0	0	0	0	0	0	0	0	1	0	0
17	FW	(Iceland) Hólmbert Aron Friðjónsson	2	0	0	0	0	0	0	0	0	0	0	0	0	0	0	2	0	0
18	DF	(Iceland) Aron Bjarki Jósepsson	3	1	0	0	0	0	0	0	0	0	0	0	2	0	0	5	1	0
19	FW	(Denmark) Søren Frederiksen	3	0	0	0	0	0	0	0	0	0	0	0	0	0	0	3	0	0
20	MF	(Denmark) Jacob Schoop	1	0	0	0	0	0	0	0	0	1	0	0	0	0	0	2	0	0
22	MF	(Iceland) Óskar Örn Hauksson	0	0	0	0	0	0	0	0	0	0	0	0	2	0	0	2	0	0
27	FW	(Iceland) Guðmundur Andri Tryggvason	0	0	0	0	0	0	1	0	0	0	0	0	0	0	0	1	0	0
	DF	(Iceland) Leifur Þorbjarnarson	0	0	0	0	0	0	1	0	0	0	0	0	0	0	0	1	0	0
