= 2016 Icelandic Men's Football League Cup =

Deildarbikar karla

Tournament details
- Country: Iceland
- Dates: 12 February 2016 — 21 April 2016
- Teams: 24

Final positions
- Champions: KR
- Runners-up: Víkingur R.

Tournament statistics
- Matches played: 67
- Goals scored: 229 (3.42 per match)
- Top goal scorer(s): Elvar Ingi Vignisson; Guðjón Pétur Lýðsson; Gary Martin; Hólmbert Friðjónsson; Morten Beck Andersen (5 goals)
- All statistics correct as of 22 April 2016.

The 2016 Icelandic Men's Football League Cup was the 21st season of the Icelandic Men's League Cup, a pre-season professional football competition in Iceland. The tournament started on 12 February and was conclude on 21 April. KR won the league cup after defeating Víkingur R. in the final 2–0.

== Participating teams ==
| Úrvalsdeild | 1. deild karla |
|---|---|
| Breiðablik; FH; Fjölnir; Fylkir; ÍA; ÍBV; KR; Stjarnan; Valur; Vikingur Reykjavik; Víkingur Ólafsvík; Þróttur | Fjarðabyggðar; Fram Reykjavík; Grindavík; Haukar; HK; Huginn; KA; Keflavík; Leiknir F.; Leiknir R.; UMF Selfoss; Þór Akureyri |

== League tables ==
=== Group 1 ===
| Pos | Team | Pld | W | D | L | GF | GA | GD | Pts | Qualification |
|---|---|---|---|---|---|---|---|---|---|---|
| 1 | Valur (Q) | 5 | 3 | 2 | 0 | 12 | 4 | +8 | 11 | Qualification to the Quarter-finals |
| 2 | Keflavík (Q) | 5 | 3 | 1 | 1 | 9 | 3 | +6 | 10 | Qualification to the Quarter-finals |
| 3 | Stjarnan | 5 | 3 | 0 | 2 | 18 | 7 | +11 | 9 | |
| 4 | ÍBV | 5 | 1 | 1 | 3 | 9 | 12 | −3 | 4 | |
| 5 | Huginn | 5 | 1 | 1 | 3 | 3 | 17 | −14 | 4 | |
| 6 | Fram Reykjavík | 5 | 0 | 3 | 2 | 8 | 16 | −8 | 3 | |

Updated to match(es) played on 2 April 2016. Source: Group 1
Rules for classification: 1) points; 2) goal difference; 3) number of goals scored.
(Q) Qualified for the phase indicated

=== Group 2 ===
| Pos | Team | Pld | W | D | L | GF | GA | GD | Pts | Qualification |
|---|---|---|---|---|---|---|---|---|---|---|
| 1 | Fylkir (Q) | 5 | 4 | 1 | 0 | 16 | 7 | +9 | 13 | Qualification to the Quarter-finals |
| 2 | Breiðablik (Q) | 5 | 3 | 1 | 1 | 8 | 7 | +1 | 10 | Qualification to the Quarter-finals |
| 3 | Víkingur Ólafsvík | 5 | 2 | 3 | 0 | 10 | 6 | +4 | 9 | |
| 4 | KA | 5 | 2 | 1 | 2 | 13 | 7 | +6 | 7 | |
| 5 | UMF Selfoss | 5 | 1 | 0 | 4 | 7 | 9 | −2 | 3 | |
| 6 | Fjarðabyggðar | 5 | 0 | 0 | 5 | 2 | 21 | −19 | 0 | |

Updated to match(es) played on 4 April 2016. Source: Group 2
Rules for classification: 1) points; 2) goal difference; 3) number of goals scored.
(Q) Qualified for the phase indicated

=== Group 3 ===
| Pos | Team | Pld | W | D | L | GF | GA | GD | Pts | Qualification |
|---|---|---|---|---|---|---|---|---|---|---|
| 1 | Vikingur Reykjavik (Q) | 5 | 4 | 0 | 1 | 13 | 7 | +6 | 12 | Qualification to the Quarter-finals |
| 2 | KR (Q) | 5 | 3 | 1 | 1 | 11 | 5 | +6 | 10 | Qualification to the Quarter-finals |
| 3 | ÍA | 5 | 3 | 1 | 1 | 15 | 11 | +4 | 10 | |
| 4 | HK | 5 | 1 | 1 | 3 | 9 | 8 | +1 | 4 | |
| 5 | Haukar | 5 | 0 | 3 | 2 | 6 | 13 | −7 | 3 | |
| 6 | Grindavík | 5 | 0 | 2 | 3 | 2 | 12 | −10 | 2 | |

Updated to match(es) played on 31 March 2016. Source: Group 3
Rules for classification: 1) points; 2) goal difference; 3) number of goals scored.
(Q) Qualified for the phase indicated

=== Group 4 ===
| Pos | Team | Pld | W | D | L | GF | GA | GD | Pts | Qualification |
|---|---|---|---|---|---|---|---|---|---|---|
| 1 | FH (Q) | 5 | 4 | 0 | 1 | 12 | 2 | +10 | 12 | Qualification to the Quarter-finals |
| 2 | Leiknir R. (Q) | 5 | 3 | 2 | 0 | 5 | 2 | +3 | 11 | Qualification to the Quarter-finals |
| 3 | Fjölnir | 5 | 3 | 0 | 2 | 11 | 7 | +4 | 9 | |
| 4 | Þór Akureyri | 5 | 2 | 1 | 2 | 9 | 10 | −1 | 7 | |
| 5 | Leiknir F. | 5 | 1 | 1 | 3 | 4 | 11 | −7 | 4 | |
| 6 | Þróttur | 5 | 0 | 0 | 5 | 1 | 10 | −9 | 0 | |

Updated to match(es) played on 6 April 2016. Source: Group 4
Rules for classification: 1) points; 2) goal difference; 3) number of goals scored.
(Q) Qualified for the phase indicated

== Knockout stage ==
=== Quarter-finals ===
The top two teams of each group entered the quarter-finals stage, with ties being played between 7 and 14 April 2016.

| 7 April 2016 | Vikingur Reykjavik | 0–0 (5–3 p) | Leiknir R. | Reykjavík |
| 18:00 | | KSI Report | | Stadium: Víkingsvöllur; Referee: Erlendur Eiriksson |

| 8 April 2016 | Fylkir | 0–3 | KR | Reykjavík |
| 18:00 | | KSI Report | Andersen 50', 66'; Hauksson 56' | Stadium: Vodafonevöllurinn; Referee: Gudmundur Gudmundsson Ársæll |

| 8 April 2016 | Keflavík | 0–0 (4–2 p) | FH | Reykjanesbær |
| 19:00 | | KSI Report | | Stadium: Reykjaneshöllin; Attendance: 180; Referee: Peter Gudmundsson |

| 14 April 2016 | Valur | 2–1 | Breiðablik | Reykjavík |
| 17:30 | Sigurðsson 45'; Toft 72' | KSI Report | Steinþórsson 16' | Stadium: Vodafonevöllurinn; Referee: Gunnar Jarl Jónsson |

=== Semi-finals ===
The semi-final matches were contested on 15 and 18 April 2016.

| 15 April 2016 | KR | 4–0 | Keflavík | Reykjavík |
| 19:00 | Andersen 44', 45'; Friðjónsson 62'; Sigurðsson 90' | KSI Report | | Stadium: KR-völlur; Referee: Þóroddur Hjaltalín |

| 18 April 2016 | Valur | 2–2 (4–5 p) | Vikingur Reykjavik | Reykjavík |
| 19:00 | Bergsson 79'; Ómarsson 90+1'; Stefánsson (red card) 88' | KSI Report | Martin 35', 83'; Tufegdžić (yellow card) 89' (yellow-red card) | Stadium: Vodafonevöllurinn; Referee: Vilhjálmur Alvar Þórarinsson |

=== Final ===
The final was played on 21 April 2016 at Egilshöll in Reykjavík.

21 April 2016
19:15

| KR | 2–0 | Vikingur Reykjavik |
|---|---|---|
| Hauksson 46', 56' | Report |

Egilshöll, Reykjavík
Attendance: 511
Referee: Pétur Guðmundsson

== Top goalscorers ==
As of 21 April 2016

| Rank | Player | Club | Goals |
|---|---|---|---|
| 1 | (Iceland) Elvar Ingi Vignisson | ÍBV | 5 |
| 1 | (Iceland) Guðjón Pétur Lýðsson | Valur | 5 |
| 1 | (England) Gary Martin | Víkingur R. | 5 |
| 1 | (Iceland) Hólmbert Friðjónsson | KR | 5 |
| 1 | (Denmark) Morten Beck Andersen | KR | 5 |
