= 2015 Icelandic Cup =

Borgunarbikar

Tournament details
- Country: Iceland
- Teams: 52

Final positions
- Champions: Valur
- Runners-up: KR

Tournament statistics
- Matches played: 30
- Goals scored: 157 (5.23 per match)

The 2015 Icelandic Cup, also known as Borgunarbikar for sponsorship reasons, was the 56th edition of the Icelandic national football cup. Valur won the title, making it their first win in ten years.

== Calendar ==
Below are the dates for each round as given by the official schedule:

Round	Main date	Number of fixtures	Clubs
First Round	1–9 May 2015	25	50 → 25
Second Round	18–20 May 2015	20	42 → 21
Third Round	2–4 June 2015	16	32 → 16
Fourth Round	18 June 2015	8	16 → 8
Quarter-finals	4–6 July 2015	4	8 → 4
Semi-finals	29–30 July 2015	2	4 → 2
Final	15 August 2015	1	2 → 1

== First round ==
Team 1	Score	Team 2
1 May 2015
Skínandi	6–2	KFR
Víðir	1–2 (a.e.t.)	Kría
Vængir Júpiters	3–1 (a.e.t.)	Gnúpverjar
Árborg	9–0	Kóngarnir
KB	2–4	Þróttur Vogum
Höttur	16–0	Hrafnkell Fr.
2 May 2015
Nökkvi	0–1	Dalvík/Reynir
Mídas	3–4 (a.e.t.)	Vatnaliljur
Hamar	0–7	Kári Akranes
ÍH	0–2	Örninn
Stál-úlfur	2–6	Ægir
Elliði	0–4 (a.e.t.)	Léttir
KV	3–0	SR
Snæfell	1–7	KH
Hörður	0–5	KFG
Hamrarnir/Vinir	0–4	Magni
Einherji	2–4	Sindri
3 May 2015
Ísbjörninn	0–9	Reynir S.
Hvíti Riddarinn	2–7	Augnablik
Álftanes	2–0	KFS
Völsungur	2–0	KF
Njarðvík	8–0	Afríka
Leiknir F.	0–0 (a.e.t.) (6–5 p)	Huginn
6 May 2015
Ármann	2–4	Berserkir
9 May 2015
Skallagrímur	11–0	Stokkseyri

1 May 2015	Vængir Júpiters	3–1 (a.e.t.)	Gnúpverjar	Fjölnisvöllur, Reykjavík
16:00 CET	Atli Hjaltested 36'; Guðfinnur Magnússon 110'; Marinó Þór Jakobsson 112'		Örn Bergmann Úlfarsson 44'	Referee: Steinar Stephensen

1 May 2015	Víðir	1–2 (a.e.t.)	Kría	Nesfisk-völlurinn, Garður
16:00 CET	Helgi Þór Jónsson 90'		Eiríkur Ársælsson 79'; Lárus Brynjar Bjarnason (red card) 90+1'; Pétur Rögnvaldsson 112'	Referee: Árni Heiðar Guðmundsson

1 May 2015	Skínandi	6–2	KFR	Samsung völlurinn, Garðabær
16:00 CET	Ágúst Leó Björnsson 16', 24'; Guðbjörn Snær Björnsson 35'; Snæþór Fannar Kristinsson 47'; Guðmundur Ásgeir Guðmundsson 77', 85'		Helgi Ármannsson 57'; Guðmundur Garðar Sigfússon 74'	Referee: Helgi Mikael Jónasson

1 May 2015	KB	2–4	Þróttur Vogum	Leiknisvöllur, Reykjavík
16:00 CET	Kjartan Andri Baldvinsson 14', 53'		Andri Gíslason 17', 21', 70'; Kristján Steinn Magnússon 58'	Referee: Pétur Guðmundsson

1 May 2015	Árborg	9–0	Kóngarnir	Jáverk-völlurinn, Selfoss
16:00 CET	Magnús Helgi Sigurðsson 33'; Tómas Ingvi Hassing 38', 48', 62', 76'; Daníel Ingi Birgisson 42', 81'; Tómas Kjartansson 54'; Halldór Áskell Stefánsson 90+2'		Svavar Dór Ragnarsson (yellow card) 86' (yellow-red card)	Referee: Gunnþór Steinar Jónsson

1 May 2015	Höttur	16–0	Hrafnkell Fr.	Fellavöllur, Egilsstaðir
16:30 CET	Kristófer Örn Kristjánsson 6'; Jovan Kujundzic 17', 54' (pen.); Högni Helgason 22', 37', 67', 90+1'; 26' (o.g.); Garðar Már Grétarsson 35', 63', 70', 86', 90+2'; Jordan Farahani 50'; Brynjar Árnason 65'; Bragi Emilsson 76'			Referee: Gunnar Gunnarsson

2 May 2015	Nökkvi	0–1	Dalvík/Reynir	KA-völlur, Akureyri
15:00 CET			Jóhann Már Kristinsson 90'	Referee: Sveinn Þórður Þórðarson

2 May 2015	Mídas	3–4 (a.e.t.)	Vatnaliljur	Framvöllur, Reykjavík
15:00 CET	Stefán Gunnar Jóhannsson 11'; Sigurður Ólafur Kjartansson 52'; Hjalti Arnarson 90'; Daníel Björn Sigurbjörnsson (yellow card) (yellow-red card) 99'		Árni Henry Gunnarsson 27'; Garðar Sigurðsson 39', 58'; Fannar Árnason 95'	Referee: Gunnar Helgason

2 May 2015	Snæfell	1–7	KH	Stykkishólmsvöllur, Stykkishólmur
16:00 CET	Jóhannes Helgi Alfreðsson 59'		Arnar Steinn Einarsson 20', 26' (pen.), 35'; Atli Sigurðsson 52', 56'; Alexander Lúðvígsson 75', 87'	Referee: Magnús Þór Jónsson

2 May 2015	Stál-úlfur	2–6	Ægir	Kórinn Gervigrasvöllur, Kópavogur
16:00 CET	Karol Stempinski 84'; Magnús Pálmi Gunnarsson 86'		William Daniels 13', 43'; 21' (o.g.); Uchenna Michael Onyeador 30'; Milan Djurovic 75'	Referee: Magnús Garðarsson

2 May 2015	KV	3–0	SR	KR-völlur, Reykjavík
16:00 CET	Ásgrímur Gunnarsson 45'; Guðmundur Sigurðsson 49', 88'			Referee: Karel Fannar Sveinbjörnsson

2 May 2015	ÍH	0–2	Örninn	Kaplakrikavöllur, Hafnarfjörður
16:00 CET	Eiríkur Viljar H. Kúld (red card) 32'; Örn Rúnar Magnússon (yellow card) 70' (yellow-red card); Jón Ásbjörnsson (red card) 80'		Kwami Obaioni Silva Santos 71'; Viktor Jes Ingvarsson 90'	Referee: Óli Njáll Ingólfsson

2 May 2015	Hamar	0–7	Kári Akranes	Jáverk-völlurinn, Selfoss
16:00 CET			Valgeir Daði Valgeirsson 32'; Ragnar Þór Gunnarsson 47'; Fjalar Örn Sigurðsson 48', 75', 90' (pen.); Dominik Bajda 54'; Sverrir Mar Smárason 90+3'	Referee: Arnar Þór Stefánsson

2 May 2015	Elliði	0–4 (a.e.t.)	Léttir	Fylkisvöllur, Reykjavík
16:00 CET			Þorleifur Sigurlásson 103'; Viggó Pétur Pétursson 107'; Orri Rafn Sigurðarson 112'; Haukur Már Ólafsson 115'	Referee: Einar Ingi Jóhannsson

2 May 2015	Hörður	0–5	KFG	Víkin, Reykjavík
18:00 CET			Andri Valur Ívarsson 3', 55'; Bjarni Pálmason 44', 83'; Daði Kristjánsson 60'	Referee: Snorri Páll Einarsson

2 May 2015	Hamrarnir/Vinir	0–4	Magni	KA-völlur, Akureyri
18:00 CET			Hreggviður Heiðberg Gunnarsson 32'; Lars Óli Jessen 64'; Arnar Geir Halldórsson 71'; Símon Símonarson 83'	Referee: Vilhelm Adolfsson

2 May 2015	Einherji	2–4	Sindri	Vopnafjarðarvöllur, Vopnafjörður
19:00 CET	Sigurður Donys Sigurðsson 44', 45'		Sigurður Bjarni Jónsson 7', 77', 90'; Einar Smári Þorsteinsson 76' (pen.)	Referee: Jóhann Óskar Þórólfsson

3 May 2015	Völsungur	2–0	KF	Húsavíkurvöllur, Húsavík
16:00 CET	Jóhann Þórhallsson 43', 53'			Referee: Valdimar Pálsson

3 May 2015	Njarðvík	8–0	Afríka	Njarðtaksvöllur, Njarðvík
16:00 CET	Theodór Guðni Halldórsson 10', 64', 71'; Róbert Örn Ólafsson 19'; Bergþór Ingi Smárason 54', 90+3'; Arnór Svansson 62'; Magnús Þór Magnússon 77'			Referee: Skúli Freyr Brynjólfsson

3 May 2015	Álftanes	2–0	KFS	Bessastaðavöllur, Álftanes
16:00 CET	Guðbjörn Alexander Sæmundsson 63'; Darri Steinn Konráðsson 87'			Referee: Guðmundur Ársæll Guðmundsson

3 May 2015	Ísbjörninn	0–9	Reynir S.	Kórinn Gervigrasvöllur, Kópavogur
16:00 CET	Einar Páll Ágústsson (yellow card) 68' (yellow-red card); Guðmundur Kristinn Vilbergsson (yellow card) 68' (yellow-red card)		Sindri Lars Ómarsson 3', 21', 54'; Margeir Felix Gústavsson 36', 63'; Birkir Freyr Sigurðsson 70'; Pétur Þór Jaidee 75'; Magnús Einar Magnússon 76'; Jóhann Magni Jóhannsson 88'	Referee: Guðmundur Ævar Guðmundsson

3 May 2015	Hvíti Riddarinn	2–7	Augnablik	N1-völlurinn Varmá Gervigras, Mosfellsbær
16:00 CET	Haukur Eyþórsson 13'; Axel Lárusson 58'		Hreinn Bergs 23', 68', 87'; Hjörtur Júlíus Hjartarson 50'; Arnar Sigurðsson 70'; Gunnar Örn Jónsson 70'; Óðinn Ómarsson 90'	Referee: Þorvaldur Árnason

3 May 2015	Leiknir F.	0–0 (a.e.t.) (6–5 p)	Huginn	Fjarðabyggðarhöllin, Reyðarfjörður
18:00 CET				Referee: Tómas Orri Hreinsson

6 May 2015	Ármann	2–4	Berserkir	Gervigrasvöllur Laugardal, Reykjavík
23:00 CET	Hans Sævar Sævarsson 3'; Jón Hafsteinn Jóhannsson 6'		Marteinn Briem 47', 81'; Kári Einarsson 66'; Einar Guðnason 84'	Referee: Sigurður Ingi Magnússon

9 May 2015	Skallagrímur	11–0	Stokkseyri	Skallagrímsvöllur, Borgarnes
16:00 CET	Birgir Theodór Ásmundsson 20'; Sölvi G. Gylfason 28', 38', 74'; Baldvin Freyr Ásmundsson 37', 62'; Viktor Ingi Jakobsson 48'; Heimir Þór Ásgeirsson 79'; Leifur Guðjónsson 83'; Viktor Már Jónasson 90' (pen.); Hörður Óli Þórðarson 90+3'			Referee: Jónas Geirsson

== Second round ==
Team 1	Score	Team 2
18 May 2015
Ægir	0–3	KV
Grindavík	1–0	Þróttur Vogum
KH	0–3	HK
KFG	2–1	Árborg
19 May 2015
Grótta	0–2	Fram
BÍ/Bolungarvík	6–0	Skallagrímur
ÍR	0–1	Léttir
KA Akureyri	6–0	Dalvík/Reynir
Reynir S.	0–2	Selfoss
Þór	2–0	Tindastóll
Sindri	0–0 (a.e.t.) (2–3 p)	Höttur
Víkingur Ó.	2–1	Haukar
Augnablik	1–4	Njarðvík
Völsungur	2–1 (a.e.t.)	Magni
Leiknir F.	1–1 (a.e.t.) (6–7 p)	Fjarðabyggð
Örninn	2–4 (a.e.t.)	Kári
Vatnaliljur	2–1	Berserkir
Kría	0–1 (a.e.t.)	Álftanes
20 May 2015
Þróttur R.	3–0	Vængir Júpiters
Afturelding	2–0	Skínandi

18 May 2015	Grindavík	1–0	Þróttur Vogum	Grindavíkurvöllur, Grindavík
21:00 CET	Óli Baldur Bjarnason 82'			Referee: Gunnþór Steinar Jónsson

18 May 2015	Ægir	0–3	KV	Þorlákshafnarvöllur, Þorlákshöfn
21:00 CET			Brynjar Gauti Þorsteinsson 72'; Ásgrímur Gunnarsson 75'; Jón Konráð Guðbergsson 90+3'	Referee: Jóhann Ingi Jónsson

18 May 2015	KH	0–3	HK	Hlíðarendi, Reykjavík
22:00 CET			Guðmundur Atli Steinþórsson 13'; Guðmundur Magnússon 64', 73' (pen.)	Referee: Svanlaugur Þorsteinsson

18 May 2015	KFG	2–1	Árborg	Samsung völlurinn, Garðabær
22:30 CET	Bjarni Pálmason 13'; Andri Valur Ívarsson 79'		Magnús Helgi Sigurðsson 14'	Referee: Andri Vigfússon

19 May 2015	Grótta	0–2	Fram	Vivaldivöllurinn, Seltjarnarnes
20:00 CET			Eyþór Helgi Birgisson 33'; Einar Bjarni Ómarsson 73'	Referee: Helgi Mikael Jónasson

19 May 2015	Völsungur	2–1 (a.e.t.)	Magni	Húsavíkurvöllur, Húsavík
21:00 CET	Eyþór Traustason (red card) 12'; Jóhann Þórhallsson 32' (yellow card) 115' (yellow-red card) ? 120'		Andrés Vilhjálmsson 26'	Referee: Sigurður Hjörtur Þrastarson

19 May 2015	Víkingur Ó.	2–1	Haukar	Ólafsvíkurvöllur, Ólafsvík
21:00 CET	William Dominguez da Silva 52' (pen.); Marcos Campos Gimenez 66'		Alexander Helgason 13'	Referee: Ívar Orri Kristjánsson

19 May 2015	Sindri	0–0 (a.e.t.) (2–3 p)	Höttur	Sindravellir, Höfn
21:00 CET				Referee: Tómas Orri Hreinsson

19 May 2015	Þór	2–0	Tindastóll	Þórsvöllur, Akureyri
21:00 CET	Kristinn Þór Rósbergsson 12'; Jóhann Helgi Hannesson 28'			Referee: Vilhelm Adolfsson

19 May 2015	Reynir S.	0–2	Selfoss	N1-völlurinn, Sandgerði
21:00 CET			Svavar Berg Jóhannsson 56' ? 85' (o.g.)

19 May 2015	Leiknir F.	1–1 (a.e.t.) (6–7 p)	Fjarðabyggð	Fjarðabyggðarhöllin, Reyðarfjörður
21:00 CET	Julio 90+5' (pen.)		Milos Ivankovic 90+2'	Referee: Halldór Breiðfjörð Jóhannsson

19 May 2015	KA	6–0	Dalvík/Reynir	KA-völlur, Akureyri
21:00 CET	Juraj Grizelj 15', 55'; Ben Everson 34', 39'; Ólafur Aron Pétursson 84'; Ýmir Már Geirsson 90+3'		Craig Rodgers (red card) 15'	Referee: Valdimar Pálsson

19 May 2015	ÍR	0–1	Léttir	Hertz völlurinn, Reykjavík
21:00 CET			Haukur Már Ólafsson 83'	Referee: Bríet Bragadóttir

19 May 2015	BÍ/Bolungarvík	6–0	Skallagrímur	Torfnesvöllur, Hnífsdalur
21:00 CET	Nikulás Jónsson 22'; Sigurgeir Sveinn Gíslason 32' (pen.); Rodchil Junior Prevalus 34', 45', 48', 80'			Referee: Árni Heiðar Guðmundsson

19 May 2015	Augnablik	1–4	Njarðvík	Fagrilundur, Kópavogur
21:15 CET	Arnar Sigurðsson 41'		Bergþór Ingi Smárason 36'; Theodór Guðni Halldórsson 68'; Marc Lladosa Ferrer 78'; Arnór Svansson 90+2'	Referee: Sigurður Óli Þórleifsson

19 May 2015	Örninn	2–4 (a.e.t.)	Kári	Kórinn Gervigrasvöllur, Kópavogur
22:00 CET	Kwami Obaioni Silva Santos 2'; Ingvar Gylfason 19'		Salvar Georgsson 15'; Óliver Darri Bergmann Jónsson 90+1', 98', 101'	Referee: Steinar Stephensen

19 May 2015	Vatnaliljur	2–1	Berserkir	Fagrilundur, Kópavogur
22:30 CET	Björn Öder Ólason 38'; Felix Hjálmarsson 51'; Fannar Árnason (red card) 59'		Einar Guðnason 43'	Referee: Snorri Páll Einarsson

19 May 2015	Kría	0–1 (a.e.t.)	Álftanes	Vivaldivöllurinn, Seltjarnarnes
22:30 CET			Magnús Ársælsson 113'; Ari Leifur Jóhannsson (red card) 68'; Darri Steinn Konráðsson (yellow card) 120+1' (yellow-red card)	Referee: Kristinn Friðrik Hrafnsson

20 May 2015	Þróttur R.	3–0	Vængir Júpiters	Gervigrasvöllur Laugardal, Reykjavík
21:00 CET	Rafn Andri Haraldsson 82'; Ragnar Pétursson 87'; Björgólfur Hideaki Takefusa 90'			Referee: Aðalbjörn Heiðar Þorsteinsson

20 May 2015	Afturelding	2–0	Skínandi	N1-völlurinn Varmá, Mosfellsbær
21:00 CET	Andri Hrafn Sigurðsson 72'; Valgeir Steinn Runólfsson 90'			Referee: Magnús Garðarsson

== Third round ==
Team 1	Score	Team 2
2 June 2015
Fjarðabyggð	4–0	Kári
KA	4–0	Álftanes
Völsungur	3–4	Grindavík
KV	2–1	Fram
Þróttur R.	4–1	BÍ/Bolungarvík
Vatnaliljur	0–3	Afturelding
3 June 2015
Léttir	0–6	ÍBV
Þór	2–3	Víkingur Ó.
FH	2–1	HK
Fylkir	3–2	Njarðvík
ÍA	0–3	Fjölnir
Keflavík	0–5	KR
Stjarnan	1–1 (a.e.t.) (6–5 p)	Leiknir R.
Valur	4–0	Selfoss
Víkingur R.	2–0 (a.e.t.)	Höttur
4 June 2015
KFG	1–3	Breiðablik

2 June 2015	Fjarðabyggð	4–0	Kári	Norðfjarðarvöllur, Neskaupstaður
20:30 CET	Brynjar Jónasson 3'; Ólafur Örn Eyjólfsson 28'; Ingvar Ásbjörn Ingvarsson 78'; Viðar Þór Sigurðsson 88'			Referee: Aðalbjörn Heiðar Þorsteinsson

2 June 2015	KA	4–0	Álftanes	KA-völlur, Akureyri
21:00 CET	Ævar Ingi Jóhannesson 49'; Orri Gústafsson 73'; Ólafur Aron Pétursson 75'; Ben Everson 85'			Referee: Valdimar Pálsson

2 June 2015	Völsungur	3–4	Grindavík	Húsavíkurvöllur, Húsavík
21:00 CET	Péter Odrobéna 61'; Sæþór Olgeirsson 82'; Rafnar Smárason 87'		Alejandro Jesus Blzquez Hernandez 7'; Ásgeir Þór Ingólfsson 12'; Óli Baldur Bjarnason 33', 41'	Referee: Þóroddur Hjaltalín

2 June 2015	KV	2–1	Fram	KR-völlur, Reykjavík
22:15 CET	Davíð Steinn Sigurðarson 46'; Brynjar Orri Bjarnason 80' (pen.)		Orri Gunnarsson 52'	Referee: Ívar Orri Kristjánsson

2 June 2015	Þróttur R.	4–1	BÍ/Bolungarvík	Gervigrasvöllur Laugardal, Reykjavík
22:15 CET	Viktor Jónsson 47', 58', 68' (pen.); Davíð Þór Ásbjörnsson 89'		Joseph Thomas Spivack 27'	Referee: Pétur Guðmundsson

2 June 2015	Vatnaliljur	0–3	Afturelding	Fagrilundur, Kópavogur
23:00 CET	Garðar Sigurðsson (red card) 45+1'		Kristófer Örn Jónsson 41'; Wentzel Steinarr R. Kamban 45', 77'	Referee: Halldór Breiðfjörð Jóhannsson

3 June 2015	Léttir	0–6	ÍBV	Hertz völlurinn, Reykjavík
20:30 CET			Dominic Khori Adams 23', 70', 90+1'; Jonathan Glenn 36'; Richard Sæþór Sigurðsson 85', 86'	Referee: Helgi Mikael Jónasson

3 June 2015	Þór	2–3	Víkingur Ó.	Þórsvöllur, Akureyri
21:00 CET	Sveinn Elías Jónsson 17'; Kristinn Þór Rósbergsson 36'		Kristinn Magnús Pétursson 20'; Ingólfur Sigurðsson 82'; Kristófer Eggertsson 87'	Referee: Gunnar Sverrir Gunnarsson

3 June 2015	Keflavík	0–5	KR	Nettóvöllurinn, Keflavík
22:15 CET	Unnar Már Unnarsson (red card) 44'		Grétar Sigfinnur Sigurðarson 15'; Almarr Ormarsson 42'; Þorsteinn Már Ragnarsson 60'; Søren Frederiksen 67'; Guðmundur Andri Tryggvason 82'	Referee: Þorvaldur Árnason

3 June 2015	Víkingur R.	2–0 (a.e.t.)	Höttur	Víkingsvöllur, Reykjavík
22:15 CET	Rolf Toft 96'; Igor Tasković 111'		Aron Gauti Magnússon (red card) 88'	Referee: Sigurður Óli Þórleifsson

3 June 2015	Valur	4–0	Selfoss	Vodafonevöllurinn, Reykjavík
22:15 CET	Patrick Pedersen 24', 65', 90'; Tómas Óli Garðarsson 90+2'			Referee: Garðar Örn Hinriksson

3 June 2015	ÍA	0–3	Fjölnir	Norðurálsvöllurinn, Akranes
22:15 CET			Mark Charles Magee 13', 18'; Aron Sigurðarson 83'	Referee: Guðmundur Ársæll Guðmundsson

3 June 2015	FH	2–1	HK	Kaplakriki, Hafnarfjörður
22:15 CET	Steven Lennon 33'; Þórarinn Ingi Valdimarsson 45'		Guðmundur Atli Steinþórsson 5' (pen.)	Referee: Vilhjálmur Alvar Þórarinsson

3 June 2015	Fylkir	3–2	Njarðvík	Fylkisvöllur, Reykjavík
22:15 CET	Ásgeir Örn Arnþórsson 84'; Ragnar Bragi Sveinsson 90+2'; Davíð Einarsson 90+4'		Bergþór Ingi Smárason 39'; Kristjan Hauksson 69' (o.g.)	Referee: Valgeir Valgeirsson

3 June 2015	Stjarnan	1–1 (a.e.t.) (6–5 p)	Leiknir R.	Samsung völlurinn, Garðabær
22:15 CET	Jeppe Hansen 32'		Kristján Páll Jónsson 22'	Referee: Erlendur Eiríksson

4 June 2015	KFG	1–3	Breiðablik	Samsung völlurinn, Garðabær
22:15 CET	Hákon Atli Bryde 73'		Arnór Gauti Ragnarsson 41'; Haukur Þorsteinsson 84' (o.g.); Höskuldur Gunnlaugsson 90+2'	Referee: Leiknir Ágústsson

== Fourth round ==
Team 1	Score	Team 2
18 June 2015
Þróttur R.	0–2	ÍBV
Fjarðabyggð	0–4	Valur
KV	1–7	KR
Stjarnan	0–3	Fylkir
FH	2–1	Grindavík
Víkingur R.	1–0	Afturelding
Fjölnir	4–0	Víkingur Ó.
Breiðablik	0–1 (a.e.t.)	KA

18 June 2015	Þróttur R.	0–2	ÍBV	Laugardalsvöllur, Reykjavík
20:30 CET			Jonathan Glenn 35'; Víðir Þorvarðarson 75'	Referee: Þóroddur Hjaltalín

18 June 2015	Fjarðabyggð	0–4	Valur	Fjarðabyggðarhöllin, Reyðarfjörður
21:00 CET			Kristinn Freyr Sigurðsson 15'; Daði Bergsson 40'; Patrick Pedersen 51'; Haukur Ásberg Hilmarsson 90+2'	Referee: Erlendur Eiríksson

18 June 2015	KV	1–7	KR	KR-völlur, Reykjavík
22:15 CET	Jón Kári Ívarsson 83'		Óskar Örn Hauksson 13', 54'; Pálmi Rafn Pálmason 26', 45', 64' (pen.); Almarr Ormarsson 33'; Jacob Schoop 35'	Referee: Guðmundur Ársæll Guðmundsson

18 June 2015	Stjarnan	0–3	Fylkir	Samsung völlurinn, Garðabær
22:15 CET			Tómas Þorsteinsson 26'; Albert Brynjar Ingason 77'; Ragnar Bragi Sveinsson 87'	Referee: Garðar Örn Hinriksson

18 June 2015	FH	2–1	Grindavík	Kaplakriki, Hafnarfjörður
22:15 CET	Steven Lennon 8' (pen.), 35' (pen.)		Hákon Ívar Ólafsson 87'	Referee: Valgeir Valgeirsson

18 June 2015	Víkingur R.	1–0	Afturelding	Víkingsvöllur, Reykjavík
22:15 CET	Atli Fannar Jónsson 1'; Haukur Baldvinsson (yellow card) 90+2' (yellow-red card)			Referee: Valdimar Pálsson

18 June 2015	Fjölnir	4–0	Víkingur Ó.	Fjölnisvöllur, Reykjavík
22:15 CET	Þórir Guðjónsson 17', 63'; Gunnar Már Guðmundsson 19'; Aron Sigurðarson 53'			Referee: Þorvaldur Árnason

18 June 2015	Breiðablik	0–1 (a.e.t.)	KA	Kópavogsvöllur, Kópavogur
22:15 CET			Ævar Ingi Jóhannesson 98'	Referee: Vilhjálmur Alvar Þórarinsson

== Quarter-finals ==
Team 1	Score	Team 2
4 July 2015
ÍBV	4–0	Fylkir
5 July 2015
Víkingur R.	1–2	Valur
KR	2–1	FH
6 July 2015
KA	2–1	Fjölnir

4 July 2015	ÍBV	4–0	Fylkir	Hásteinsvöllur, Vestmannaeyjar
22:15 CET	Bjarni Gunnarsson 34', 70'; Ian Jeffs 54'; Aron Bjarnason 63'			Referee: Vilhjálmur Alvar Þórarinsson

5 July 2015	Víkingur R.	1–2	Valur	Víkingsvöllur, Reykjavík
22:15 CET	Andri Rúnar Bjarnason 34'		Thomas Nielsen 47' (o.g.); Iain Williamson 80'	Referee: Gunnar Jarl Jónsson

5 July 2015	KR	2–1	FH	KR-völlur, Reykjavík
23:00 CET	Óskar Örn Hauksson 15'; Gary Martin 61'		Kassim Doumbia 17'	Referee: Garðar Örn Hinriksson

6 July 2015	KA	2–1	Fjölnir	Akureyrarvöllur, Akureyri
20:00 CET	Davíð Rúnar Bjarnason 6'; Ævar Ingi Jóhannesson 7'		Mark Magee 53'	Referee: Erlendur Eiríksson

== Semi-finals ==
29 July 2015	KA	1–1 (a.e.t.) (3–5 p)	Valur	Akureyrarvöllur, Akureyri
21:00 CET	Elfar Árni Aðalsteinsson 6' (pen.)		Orri Sigurður Ómarsson 23'	Referee: Vilhjálmur Alvar Þórarinsson

30 July 2015	KR	4–1	ÍBV	Alvogenvöllurinn, Reykjavík
21:00 CET	Hólmbert Friðjónsson 23', 41'; Óskar Örn Hauksson 54'; Þorsteinn Már Ragnarsson 67'		Bjarni Gunnarsson 70'	Referee: Þóroddur Hjaltalín

== Final ==
15 August 2015	Valur	2–0	KR	Laugardalsvöllur, Reykjavík
19:00 CET	Bjarni Ólafur Eiríksson 71'; Kristinn Ingi Halldórsson 87'			Attendance: 5,751; Referee: Erlendur Eiríksson
