= Giordano Pantano =

Italian footballer

Personal information
- Date of birth: 26 May 1992 (age 34)
- Place of birth: Catania, Italy
- Height: 1.80 m (5 ft 11 in)
- Position: Centre-back

Team information
- Current team: ASD Digiesse PraiaTortora

Youth career
- –2011: Lazio

Senior career*
Years	Team	Apps	(Gls)
2011–2013	Pro Patria	58	(0)
2013–2014	Sorrento	26	(0)
2014–2015	Lucchese	2	(0)
2015	Lumezzane	13	(0)
2016–2017	Selfoss	32	(0)
2018	Acireale	7	(1)
2018–2019	Budoni	36	(1)
2019–2020	Nardò	14	(0)
2020–2021	Team Altamura	24	(1)
2021	Vado	9	(0)
2021–2022	Sanremese	9	(0)
2022–2023	Aglianese	30	(1)
2023	Akragas	11	(0)
2023–2024	Gravina	10	(0)
2024–2025	AC Locri 1909	27	(1)
2025–2026	Sambiase	29	(0)
2026–	ASD Digiesse PraiaTortora	0	(0)
- * Club domestic league appearances and goals as of 26 September 2026

Giordano Pantano (born 26 May 1992) is an Italian footballer who plays as a centre back for ASD Digiesse PraiaTortora.
