= Michael Præst =

Danish footballer (born 1986)

Personal information
- Full name: Michael Præst
- Date of birth: 25 July 1986 (age 40)
- Place of birth: Give, Denmark
- Height: 1.83 m (6 ft 0 in)
- Position: Defender

Team information
- Current team: KR Reykjavíkur

Youth career
- –2006: Ammitsbøl/Jerlev IF
- 2006–2007: Vejle BK

Senior career*
| Years | Team | Apps | (Gls) |
| 2007–2009 | Vejle Boldklub | 5 | (1) |
| 2009 | → Kolding FC (loan) | 14 | (1) |
| 2009–2011 | Kolding FC | 11 | (0) |
| 2011–2013 | FC Fyn | 19 | (3) |
| 2013–2015 | Stjarnan | 47 | (1) |
| 2015– | KR Reykjavík | 4 | (0) |
- * Club domestic league appearances and goals as of 5 January 2016

Michael Præst (born 25 July 1986) is a Danish professional football player in the defender position, who currently plays for KR Reykjavíkur in the Úrvalsdeild.

== Career ==
On 1 September 2007 he signed a 2-year contract with Vejle Boldklub, after playing in the club as a youth player. He made his debut for Vejle in August 2008, and went on to play five games and score one goal for the club, including two league games. He was loaned out to Kolding FC in January 2009, and signed a permanent contract with the club in July 2009. He prolonged his Kolding deal in January 2010.
