= Ian Jeffs =

English footballer and assistant manager

Personal information
- Full name: Ian David Jeffs
- Date of birth: 12 October 1982 (age 44)
- Place of birth: Chester, England
- Position: Midfielder

Team information
- Current team: Iceland (assistant); ÍBV (men's, assistant)
- Number: 30

Senior career*
Years	Team	Apps	(Gls)
2001–2004	Crewe Alexandra	0	(0)
2002–2003	→ Kidsgrove Athletic (loan)	?	(?)
2003	→ ÍBV (loan)	16	(3)
2004–2006	ÍBV	32	(5)
2006–2007	Örebro	27	(2)
2007	ÍBV	11	(9)
2008	Fylkir	18	(2)
2009–2010	Valur	40	(3)
2011–2016	ÍBV	101	(16)
2017	KFS	1	(0)

Managerial career
- 2015–2018: ÍBV (women's)
- 2016: ÍBV (men's)
- 2018–present: Iceland (assistant)
- 2018–present: ÍBV (men's, assistant)
- * Club domestic league appearances and goals as of 11 March 2018

Ian David Jeffs (born 12 October 1982) is an English former footballer and the current assistant manager of the Icelandic women's national football team and Úrvalsdeild karla club ÍBV. Úrvalsdeild kvenna club ÍBV.

Jeffs began his career with Crewe Alexandra but made only one senior appearance for the club before being released in 2004. He was loaned to Kidsgrove Athletic for a short spell during the 2002–03 season. Jeffs has spent the majority of his career playing in Iceland, where he has represented ÍBV, Fylkir and Valur. Between 2006 and 2007 he played for Swedish side Örebro, where he was part of the side that won promotion to the Allsvenskan, the top division of Swedish football.

== Playing career ==
Born in Chester, Jeffs came through the youth ranks at Crewe Alexandra and was awarded his first professional contract in February 2001 along with eleven other academy graduates, including Dean Ashton, David Vaughan and Michael Higdon. His first involvement in senior football came during a loan spell at non-league side Kidsgrove Athletic in the 2002–03 season. On 16 May 2003, it was announced that he and teammate Tom Betts were to join newly promoted Icelandic Úrvalsdeild outfit ÍBV on loan for the duration of the 2003 campaign. Jeffs made his debut for the club two days later in a 2–3 home defeat to KA. In his third appearance for ÍBV, he scored the only goal in a 1–0 home win over Fylkir as the team recorded their first victory of the season. He was almost ever-present in the ÍBV starting line-up during the first two months of the season, appearing in 11 out of 12 league and cup matches; an injury sustained in the 0–2 defeat to Þróttur kept him out of the 4–5 penalty shootout loss to Grindavík in the fourth round of the Icelandic Cup. Jeffs went on to play all but two of ÍBV's league matches in the 2003 season, scoring three goals in the process.

Jeffs and Betts returned to Crewe at the end of their loan period and were given international clearance to play for the Railwaymen following the re-opening of the transfer window on 1 January 2004. Jeffs went on to make his debut for the club two days later, coming on as a second-half substitute for Ben Rix as Crewe were beaten 0–1 at home by Telford United in the third round of the FA Cup. He was never selected to play for the club again and was released at the end of the 2003–04 campaign, having already agreed to return to ÍBV on a permanent basis for the 2004 season.

== Career statistics ==
As of 31 May 2014.

Club statistics
Club	Season	League			National Cup		League Cup		Europe (Note: Appearances and goals in UEFA Cup/UEFA Europa League)		Total	
Club	Season	Division	Apps	Goals	Apps	Goals	Apps	Goals	Apps	Goals	Apps	Goals
Crewe Alexandra	2003–04	First Division	0	0	1	0	0	0	0	0	1	0
ÍBV (loan)	2003	Úrvalsdeild	16	3	1	1	0	0	0	0	17	4
ÍBV	2004	Úrvalsdeild	15	3	2	0	0	0	0	0	17	3
ÍBV	2005	Úrvalsdeild	17	2	3	0	7	1	2	1	29	4
ÍBV	2006	Úrvalsdeild	0	0	0	0	2	0	0	0	2	0
ÍBV	Total		48	8	6	1	9	1	2	1	65	11
Örebro	2006	Superettan	25	2	0	0	0	0	0	0	25	2
Örebro	2007	Allsvenskan	2	0	0	0	0	0	0	0	2	0
Örebro	Total		27	2	0	0	0	0	0	0	27	2
ÍBV	2007	1. deild karla	11	9	0	0	0	0	0	0	11	9
Fylkir	2008	Úrvalsdeild	18	2	4	1	4	1	0	0	26	4
Valur	2009	Úrvalsdeild	20	0	3	1	5	0	0	0	28	1
Valur	2010	Úrvalsdeild	20	3	2	0	5	1	0	0	27	4
Valur	Total		40	3	5	1	10	1	0	0	55	5
ÍBV	2011	Úrvalsdeild	19	6	4	2	7	3	1	0	31	11
ÍBV	2012	Úrvalsdeild	17	3	2	1	6	1	2	0	27	5
ÍBV	2013	Úrvalsdeild	22	2	3	1	5	2	4	0	34	5
ÍBV	2014	Úrvalsdeild	5	0	0	0	5	0	0	0	10	0
ÍBV	Total		63	11	9	4	23	6	7	0	102	21
Career total			207	35	25	7	46	9	9	1	287	52

== Managing career ==
Jeffs was the manager of ÍBV women's football team from 2015 to 2018 and ÍBV men's football team in 2016. In late 2018, he was hired as the assistant manager to the Icelandic women's national football team and as an assistant to ÍBV men's football team.
