= Skúli Jón Friðgeirsson =

Icelandic footballer (born 1988)

Personal information
- Full name: Skúli Jón Friðgeirsson
- Date of birth: 30 July 1988 (age 38)
- Place of birth: Iceland
- Height: 1.87 m (6 ft 1 1/2 in)
- Position: Centre back

Senior career*
Years	Team	Apps	(Gls)
2005–2012	KR	125	(4)
2012–2015	IF Elfsborg	5	(0)
2014	→ Gefle IF (loan)	10	(1)
2015–2019	KR	86	(4)

International career
2005	Iceland U17	7	(1)
2006–2007	Iceland U19	11	(3)
2007–2011	Iceland U21	10	(1)
2010–2012	Iceland	4	(0)
- * Club domestic league appearances and goals

Skúli Jón Friðgeirsson (born 30 July 1988) is an Icelandic retired football player.

Skúli was described as a very all around player with very strong defensive skills. He could play as a midfielder but mainly as a defender which was the reason IF Elfsborg signed him, due to the many injuries among their defenders. He was right-footed and could play as secondary position right-fullback even if his main position was centre back.

== Early years ==
His mother club is KR Reykjavik where he has played ever since he transferred to IF Elfsborg.

== Club career ==
Before transferring to Elfsborg, Skúli played for KR Reykjavik which he made his debut in 2005 and since he has won all the titles to be won in Iceland, lately he won the double, league- and cup title in 2011. He have made 14 appearances in Europa League qualification with KR and is also going to play there the season 2012/2013 with his new team Elfsborg who is participating EL-qualification for the seventh time in a row, for the great results in Allsvenskan. IF Elfsborg head coach Jörgen Lennartsson commented about Skúli as such: "Skúli is an all-around player, useful in many positions, both as a center-back, wing back and defensive midfielder. He is physically strong, intelligent, has good technique and is defensively strong. He also has a very good game idea".

On 29 January 2014 Friðgeirsson signed a six-months loan deal with Gefle IF.

In September 2019, 31-year-old Friðgeirsson announced his retirement.

== Achievements ==
- 2012 Allsvenskan champion, Sweden
- 2011 Icelandic champions
- 2010, 2011 cup title, Iceland
- 2005, 2010 supercup title, Iceland
