= Gunnar Þór Gunnarsson =

Icelandic footballer

Gunnar Gunnarsson
Personal information
- Full name: Gunnar Þór Gunnarsson
- Date of birth: 4 October 1985 (age 41)
- Place of birth: Iceland
- Height: 1.83 m (6 ft 0 in)
- Position: Leftback

Team information
- Current team: KR Reykjavík
- Number: 6

Senior career*
Years	Team	Apps	(Gls)
2003–2006	Fram	54	(0)
2006–2007	Hammarby IF	45	(0)
2007–2010	IFK Norrköping	55	(1)
2011–2020	KR	131	(2)

International career^{‡}
2001–2002	Iceland U-17	8	(1)
2003	Iceland U-19	5	(0)
2004–2006	Iceland U-21	13	(0)
2007	Iceland	3	(0)
- * Club domestic league appearances and goals as of 28 September 2013 ‡ National team caps and goals as of 9 September 2007

Gunnar Þór Gunnarsson (born 4 October 1985) is an Icelandic football player who last represented KR in Pepsi deildin before retiring after the 2020 season. He left Hammarby IF on 1 November 2007 to sign a three-year contract with IFK Norrköping.

He joined Hammarby IF before the 2006 season, leaving Icelandic club Fram. He is a defender who played most commonly at left back.

== International career ==
His first international appearance for Iceland was against Spain on 28 March 2007.
