= Gary Martin (footballer) =

English footballer (born 1990)

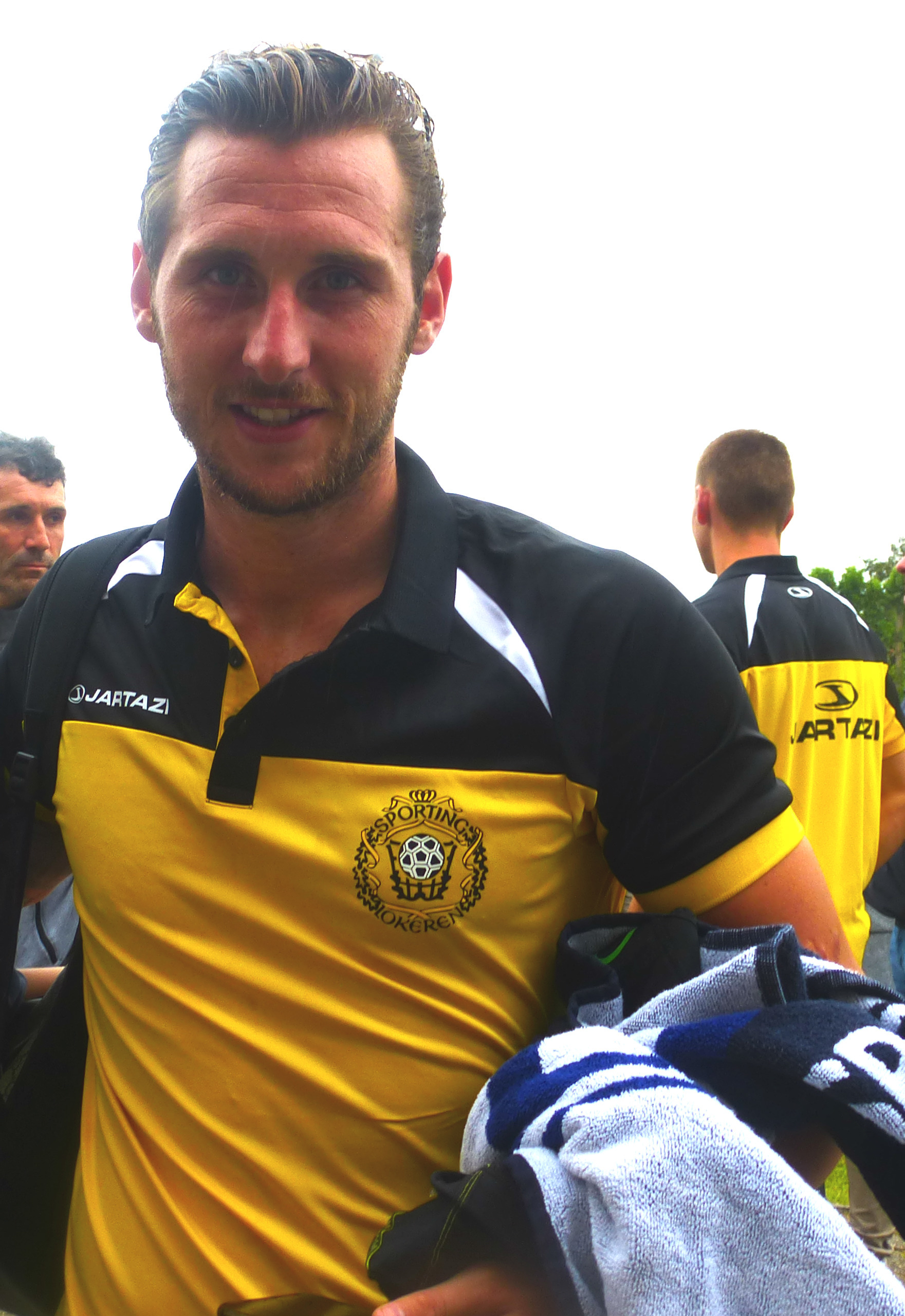
- Martin with Lokeren in 2017

Personal information
- Full name: Gary John Martin
- Date of birth: 10 October 1990 (age 36)
- Place of birth: Darlington, England
- Height: 5 ft 11 in (1.80 m)
- Position: Striker

Team information
- Current team: Hebburn Town

Youth career
- –2010: Middlesbrough

Senior career*
Years	Team	Apps	(Gls)
2010	Middlesbrough	0	(0)
2010	→ Újpest (loan)	2	(0)
2010–2012	ÍA	36	(22)
2011	→ Hjørring (loan)	6	(0)
2012–2016	KR	69	(35)
2016–2017	Víkingur Reykjavík	13	(5)
2016–2017	→ Lillestrøm (loan)	10	(4)
2017	Lokeren	8	(0)
2017	York City	3	(0)
2018–2019	Lillestrøm	19	(2)
2019	Valur	3	(2)
2019–2021	ÍBV	31	(23)
2020	→ Darlington (loan)	6	(0)
2021–2024	Selfoss	64	(26)
2024	→ Víkingur Ólafsvík (loan)	18	(10)
2024–2025	Bishop Auckland	24	(5)
2025–2026	Hebburn Town	38	(26)
2026–	Bishop Auckland	3	(1)
- * Club domestic league appearances and goals as of 17:33, 1 August 2026 (UTC)

Gary John Martin (born 10 October 1990) is an English professional footballer who plays as a striker for Northern League Division One club Bishop Auckland. Besides England, he has played in Hungary, Iceland, Belgium and Norway.

== Career ==
Martin was born in Darlington, County Durham. He started his career with Middlesbrough, where he came through the club's youth system and was given a youth-team scholarship (YTS) in 2007. He was a prolific goalscorer at both youth and reserve levels, scoring 19 goals in 39 matches for the academy team, and 17 goals in 26 appearances for the reserve team. In June 2009, his YTS was extended by a year, and in the build-up to the 2009–10 season he played with the first team in pre-season. On 23 February 2010, Martin joined Nemzeti Bajnokság I club Újpest on loan until the end of the season. He went on to make two league appearances during his spell with Újpest, coming on as a substitute in a 4–1 home win against Diósgyőr and a 1–0 defeat away to Lombard-Pápa.

After being released by Middlesbrough in May 2010, Martin signed for 1. deild karla club ÍA on 23 July 2010, initially on a short-term contract to the end of the season. He made his debut five days later, coming on as a 54th-minute substitute for Stefán Örn Arnarson in the 1–1 draw with Fjölnir, and scored his first goal for the club two weeks later in a 2–2 draw away to Þór Akureyri. Martin joined Danish 1st Division club Hjørring on loan in August 2011, making seven appearances before the club decided to not extend his loan in November.

After two successful seasons, Martin signed for Úrvalsdeild champions KR for a nominal fee. In the 2013 season, KR again won the Úrvalsdeild title, with Martin being joint top scorer in the league with 13 goals. He was named the best foreign player in the league and was selected in the Team of the Year. During the season, Martin also made his first appearance in the UEFA Europa League, scoring his first goal in that competition against Glentoran. He was the Úrvalsdeild top scorer in the 2014 season with 13 goals.

Martin signed for KR's Úrvalsdeild rivals Víkingur Reykjavík on 15 February 2016 on a three-year contract. On 10 August 2016, he signed for Tippeligaen club Lillestrøm on loan for the remainder of the 2016 season, joining up with his former coach at KR, Rúnar Kristinsson. He returned to Víkingur Reykjavík in January 2017.

Martin signed for Belgian First Division A club Lokeren on 16 January 2017 on a two-and-a-half-year contract, where he again joined up with his former manager Rúnar Kristinsson. Having not played at the beginning of the 2017–18 season, Martin was released on 18 October 2017.

On 24 October 2017, Martin signed a three-year contract to return to Lillestrøm, effective from 1 January 2018. He signed for National League North club York City on 2 November 2017 on a short-term contract, playing for them in the interim period before his transfer to Lillestrøm. He made his debut two days later in York's 2–1 home win over Curzon Ashton, in which he provided an assist for Jon Parkin to score the opening goal. Martin scored his first goal in his fourth appearance, a 3–1 home victory over Coalville Town in the FA Trophy third qualifying round on 25 November 2017. He scored the opening goal of the match, with a curling shot from the edge of the penalty area into the top-left corner. Martin left the club two days later, because of what York described as a disciplinary issue. It was reported in The Press that the club had discovered that he had been playing for Darlington Albion in the Darlington Sunday Morning Invitation League.

Martin signed for Úrvalsdeild champions Valur on 7 January 2019 on a three-year contract. However, after five months with Valur, he left the club to join fellow Úrvalsdeild club ÍBV. He finished as top scorer in the 2019 Úrvalsdeild, with 14 goals for Valur and ÍBV combined. Martin signed for his home-town club, Darlington of the National League North, on 11 January 2020 on loan until late March. On 1 May, he signed with 1. deild karla club Selfoss. In April 2024, he joined Víkingur on loan.

On 1 November 2024, Martin returned to England, signing a two-year deal with Northern Premier League side Bishop Auckland. On 16 November, he scored on his debut in a 2–0 win over Liversedge. In May 2025, Martin joined Hebburn Town.

In June 2026, Martin returned to Northern League Division One club Bishop Auckland.

== Career statistics ==
As of match played 18 September 2021

Appearances and goals by club, season and competition
Club	Season	League			National Cup (Note: Includes Magyar Kupa, Icelandic Cup, Danish Cup and Norwegian Football Cup)		League Cup		Europe		Other		Total	
Club	Season	Division	Apps	Goals	Apps	Goals	Apps	Goals	Apps	Goals	Apps	Goals	Apps	Goals
Újpest	2009–10	Nemzeti Bajnokság I	2	0	1	0	—		—		—		3	0
ÍA	2010	1. deild karla	9	10	—		—		—		—		9	10
ÍA	2011	1. deild karla	16	9	1	1	—		—		—		17	10
ÍA	2012	Úrvalsdeild	11	3	1	0	—		—		—		12	3
ÍA	Total		36	22	2	1	—		—		—		38	23
Hjørring (loan)	2011–12	Danish 1st Division	6	0	1	0	—		—		—		7	0
KR	2012	Úrvalsdeild	11	4	2	2	—		—		—		13	6
KR	2013	Úrvalsdeild	22	13	3	1	—		4 (Note: Appearances in UEFA Europa League)	1	1 (Note: Appearance in Icelandic Super Cup)	0	30	15
KR	2014	Úrvalsdeild	21	13	5	2	—		2 (Note: Appearances in UEFA Champions League)	0	1	0	29	15
KR	2015	Úrvalsdeild	15	5	3	1	—		4	0	1	0	23	6
KR	Total		69	35	13	6	—		10	1	3	0	95	42
Víkingur Reykjavík	2016	Úrvalsdeild	13	5	1	0	—		—		—		14	5
Lillestrøm (loan)	2016	Tippeligaen	10	4	—		—		—		—		10	4
Lokeren	2016–17	Belgian First Division A	8	0	—		—		—		6 (Note: Appearances in UEFA Europa League play-offs)	0	14	0
Lokeren	2017–18	Belgian First Division A	0	0	0	0	—		—		—		0	0
Lokeren	Total		8	0	0	0	—		—		6	0	14	0
York City	2017–18	National League North	3	0	—		—		—		1 (Note: Appearance in FA Trophy)	1	4	1
Lillestrøm	2018	Eliteserien	19	2	3	3	—		2	0	1 (Note: Appearance in Mesterfinalen)	0	25	5
Valur	2019	Úrvalsdeild	3	2	1	0	—		0	0	1	0	5	2
ÍBV	2019	Úrvalsdeild	12	12	—		—		0	0	—		12	12
ÍBV	2020	1. deild karla	19	11	4	7	—		—		—		23	18
ÍBV	2021	1. deild karla	0	0	1	1	—		—		—		1	1
ÍBV	Total		31	23	5	8	—		—		—		36	31
Darlington (loan)	2019–20	National League North	6	0	—		—		0	0	1	0	7	0
Selfoss	2021	1. deild karla	22	13	—		—		—		—		22	13
Career total			228	106	27	18	0	0	12	1	13	1	280	126

== Honours ==
ÍA

- 1. deild karla: 2011

KR

- Úrvalsdeild: 2013
- Icelandic Cup: 2012, 2014
- Icelandic Super Cup: 2014

Hebburn Town

- Northern Premier League Premier Division: 2025–26
