= Hólmbert Friðjónsson =

Icelandic footballer (born 1993)

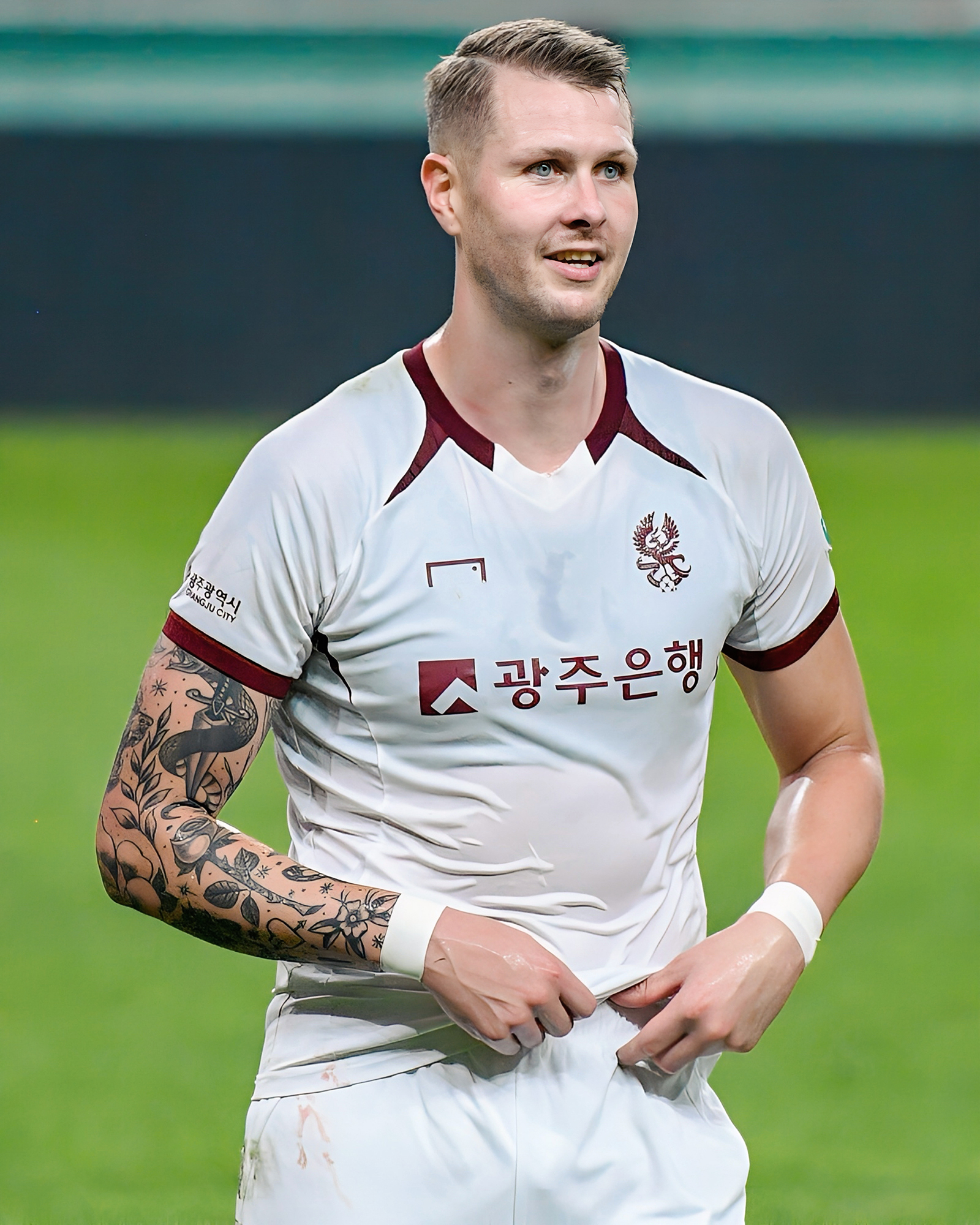
- Friðjónsson in 2025

Personal information
- Full name: Hólmbert Aron Briem Friðjónsson
- Date of birth: 19 April 1993 (age 33)
- Place of birth: Reykjavík, Iceland
- Height: 1.96 m (6 ft 5 in)
- Position: Striker

Team information
- Current team: Gwangju FC
- Number: 11

Youth career
- –2010: HK

Senior career*
Years	Team	Apps	(Gls)
2010–2011	HK	29	(7)
2011–2013	Fram	43	(11)
2013–2015	Celtic	0	(0)
2014–2015	→ Brøndby (loan)	11	(1)
2015–2016	KR	20	(3)
2016	→ Stjarnan (loan)	9	(2)
2017	Stjarnan	19	(11)
2018–2020	Aalesund	67	(36)
2020–2021	Brescia	9	(0)
2021–2024	Holstein Kiel	26	(3)
2022	→ Lillestrøm SK (loan)	27	(5)
2024–2025	Preußen Münster	23	(3)
2025–	Gwangju FC	25	(3)

International career^{‡}
2009	Iceland U17	4	(1)
2010–2011	Iceland U19	6	(2)
2012–2014	Iceland U21	10	(5)
2015–	Iceland	6	(2)
- * Club domestic league appearances and goals as of 4 August 2026 ‡ National team caps and goals as of 31 March 2021

Hólmbert Aron Briem Friðjónsson (born 19 April 1993) is an Icelandic professional footballer for South Korean football club Gwangju FC and who plays as a striker.

== Club career ==
In July 2011 Hólmbert transferred to Fram Reykjavík after making his mark as a young player with HK in the Icelandic second tier.

Keflavík-born Hólmbert emerged as a stand out player during the 2013 season and his 10 goals were crucial to help Fram Reykjavík avoid relegation from the Icelandic top league. The player also scored three times for the team in the Icelandic Cup, which helped them win the competition for the first time in 24 years. Hólmbert scored Fram's first goal in the Cup final, a 3–3 draw with Stjarnan, then converted his kick as Fram won on a penalty shootout, in a game that he described as "the highlight of my career".

After trials in the Netherlands with Heracles and in Scotland with Celtic, Hólmbert signed a four-year deal to join the Glasgow giants, for a fee of around £100,000. Although officially signing for the team on 1 January 2014 for the next transfer window, the player started training with his new club at the beginning of December 2013. Hólmbert made the decision to join the Scottish club after speaking to teammates Steven Lennon and Alan Lowing who both played previously in the Scottish Premiership.

Hólmbert joined Danish Superliga club Brøndby on loan in September 2014, after failing to feature in any competitive games for Celtic. During the loan, Hólmbert made eleven league appearances, scoring one goal. After returning to Celtic, he was released on 2 July 2015 without ever making a first team appearance. The same day, it was announced that he was returning to Iceland to play for KR Reykjavík on a 2.5-year contract. On 1 August 2016, he signed for Stjarnan on a loan deal for the remainder of the season. He then made the move permanent after the season.

On 5 October 2020, he joined Italian club Brescia.

In June 2021 it was announced Hólmbert would join 2. Bundesliga side Holstein Kiel for the 2021–22 season. In the first half of the season, he struggled with injuries and played just 82 minutes.

In January 2022 Hólmbert moved to Eliteserien club Lillestrøm SK on loan until the end of the year.

At the start of the 2024–25 season he moved to 2. Bundesliga side Preußen Münster.

On 6 August 2025, he moved to South Korean K League 1 club Gwangju FC.

== International career ==
Hólmbert received his first call-up for the Iceland national team on 16 January 2015 in a friendly against Canada. He scored his first goal on 19 January 2015 in their return friendly against Canada.

== Career statistics ==
=== Club ===
As of match played 4 August 2026

Appearances and goals by club, season and competition
Club	Season	League			National cup (Note: Includes Icelandic Men's Football Cup, Danish Cup, Norwegian Football Cup, DFB-Pokal, Korean Cup)		Continental		Total	
Club	Season	Division	Apps	Goals	Apps	Goals	Apps	Goals	Apps	Goals
HK	2010	1. deild karla	19	4	0	0	–		19	4
HK	2011	1. deild karla	10	3	1	0	–		11	3
HK	Total		29	7	1	0	0	0	30	7
Fram	2011	Úrvalsdeild	9	0	0	0	–		9	0
Fram	2012	Úrvalsdeild	13	1	2	0	–		15	1
Fram	2013	Úrvalsdeild	21	10	5	3	–		26	13
Fram	Total		43	11	7	3	0	0	50	14
Celtic	2013–14	Scottish Premiership	0	0	0	0	0	0	0	0
Brøndby (loan)	2014–15	Danish Superliga	11	1	2	0	–		13	1
KR	2015	Úrvalsdeild	10	3	2	2	2 (Note: Appearances in UEFA Europa League)	0	14	5
KR	2016	Úrvalsdeild	10	0	1	0	3	2	14	2
KR	Total		20	3	3	2	5	2	28	7
Stjarnan (loan)	2016	Úrvalsdeild	9	2	0	0	–		9	2
Stjarnan	2017	Úrvalsdeild	19	11	4	0	2	0	25	11
Aalesund	2018	Norwegian First Division	28	19	1	0	–		29	19
Aalesund	2019	Norwegian First Division	24	6	3	3	–		27	9
Aalesund	2020	Eliteserien	15	11	0	0	–		15	11
Aalesund	Total		67	36	4	3	0	0	71	39
Brescia	2020–21	Serie B	9	0	0	0	–		9	0
Holstein Kiel	2021–22	2. Bundesliga	4	0	1	0	–		5	0
Holstein Kiel	2022–23	2. Bundesliga	8	2	0	0	–		8	2
Holstein Kiel	2023–24	2. Bundesliga	14	1	2	2	–		16	3
Holstein Kiel	Total		26	3	3	2	0	0	29	5
Lillestrøm SK (loan)	2022	Eliteserien	27	5	3	1	4 (Note: Appearances in UEFA Europa Conference League)	3	34	9
Preußen Münster	2024–25	2. Bundesliga	23	3	0	0	–		23	3
Gwangju FC	2025	K League 1	9	2	3	1	–		12	3
Gwangju FC	2026	K League 1	16	1	0	0	–		16	1
Gwangju FC	Total		25	3	3	1	0	0	28	4
Career total			308	85	30	12	11	5	349	102

=== International ===
Scores and results list Iceland's goal tally first, score column indicates score after each Hólmbert goal.

List of international goals scored by Hólmbert Friðjónsson
No.	Date	Venue	Opponent	Score	Result	Competition	Ref.
1	19 January 2015	UCF Soccer and Track Stadium, Orlando	Canada	1–1	1–1	Friendly	
2	8 September 2020	King Baudouin Stadium, Brussels, Belgium	Belgium	1–0	1–5	2020–21 UEFA Nations League A	
