= KR-völlur =

Football stadium in Reykjavík, Iceland

Coordinates: 64°08′44.46″N 21°58′3.82″W

Meistaravellir
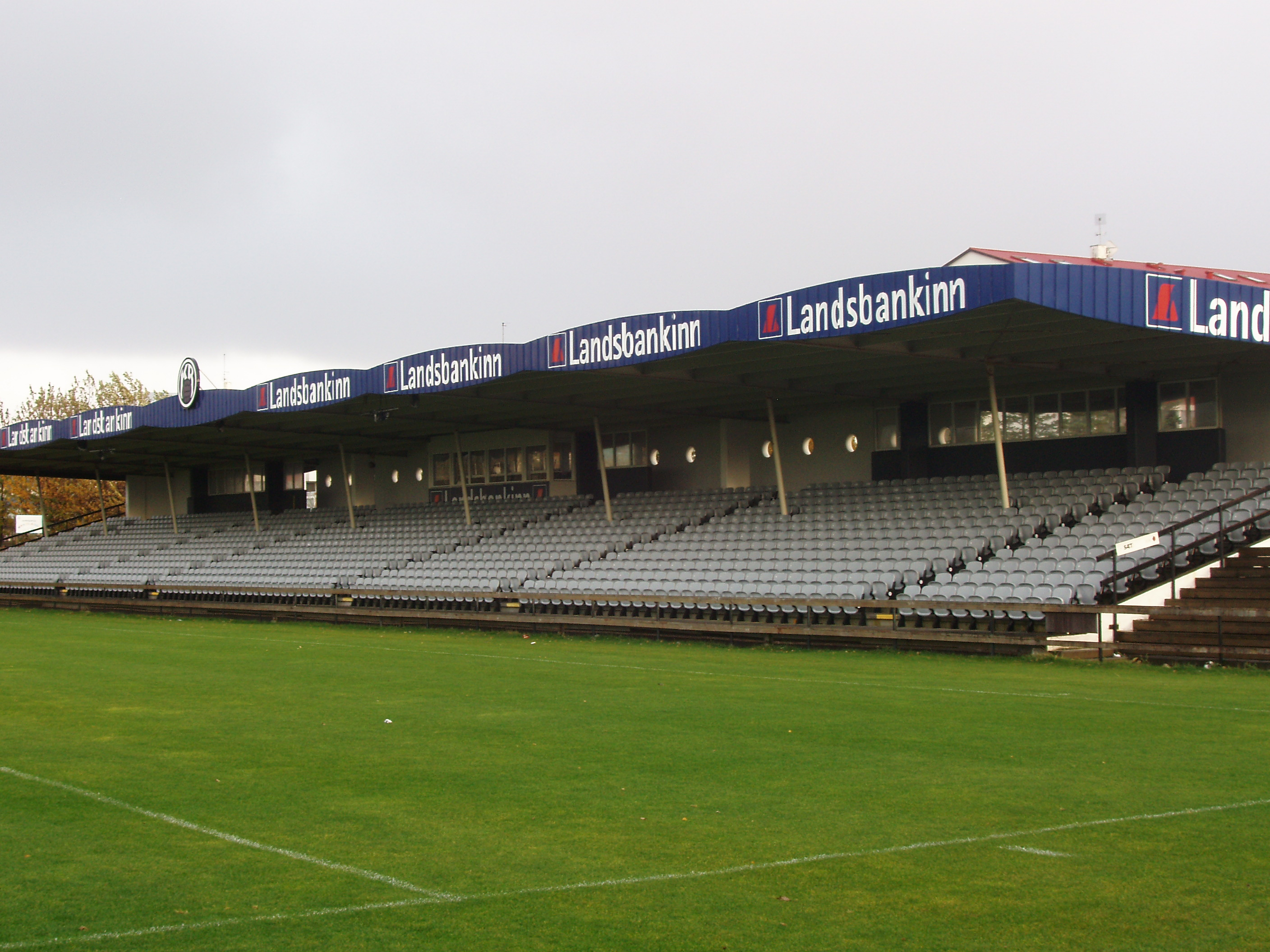
- Interactive map of Meistaravellir
- Location: Vesturbær, Reykjavík, Iceland
- Capacity: 2,781 (1,541 seated)
- Surface: Grass
- Field size: 105 m × 68 m (344 ft × 223 ft)

Construction
- Opened: 1951

Tenants
- KR Reykjavík; KV

Meistaravellir (lit. 'Master's Fields') or KR-völlur (lit. 'KR Field' or more precisely 'KR Stadium') is a football stadium in Reykjavík, Iceland.

It is currently used mostly for football matches and has been the home stadium of Knattspyrnufélag Reykjavíkur since 1984. The stadium holds about 2,700 people and is located at Kaplaskjólsvegur in West Reykjavík.

== History ==
KR-völlur was first established as a football ground in 1951 as a part time ground. KR played the majority of their matches at Laugardalsvöllur. In 1984, they moved to play their matches at KR-völlur full-time. In the same year, it hosted a UEFA Cup match between KR against English club Queen's Park Rangers. In more recent times, KR have played their European home matches at Laugardalsvöllur instead of KR-völlur. By 2011, KR-völlur had the highest regular attendance in Icelandic football.

In 2021, KR announced that they were going to be renovating KR-völlur with a new administration building paid for by Reykjavík City Council and an extra stand. The pitch would also be renovated but there was debate within the club as to whether they would retain the natural grass pitch or install an artificial pitch. Due to a number of delays, which included the Rekjavik city council delaying planning permission and a shortage of funding for the project from the council, the renovations would eventually start in 2024 and the decision was made to install an artificial pitch as the designer had originally envisaged. This was because it was felt that the club needed an artificial pitch because they were using their artificial training pitch for all of their teams' adult and youth football training and matches and it was damaging the surface after just a year of installation. There were suggestions that KR could have financed it using sponsorship money Alvogen but they opted not to utilise this option.

== Gallery ==
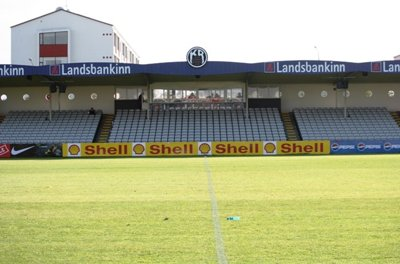
The Meistaravellir in spring 2007

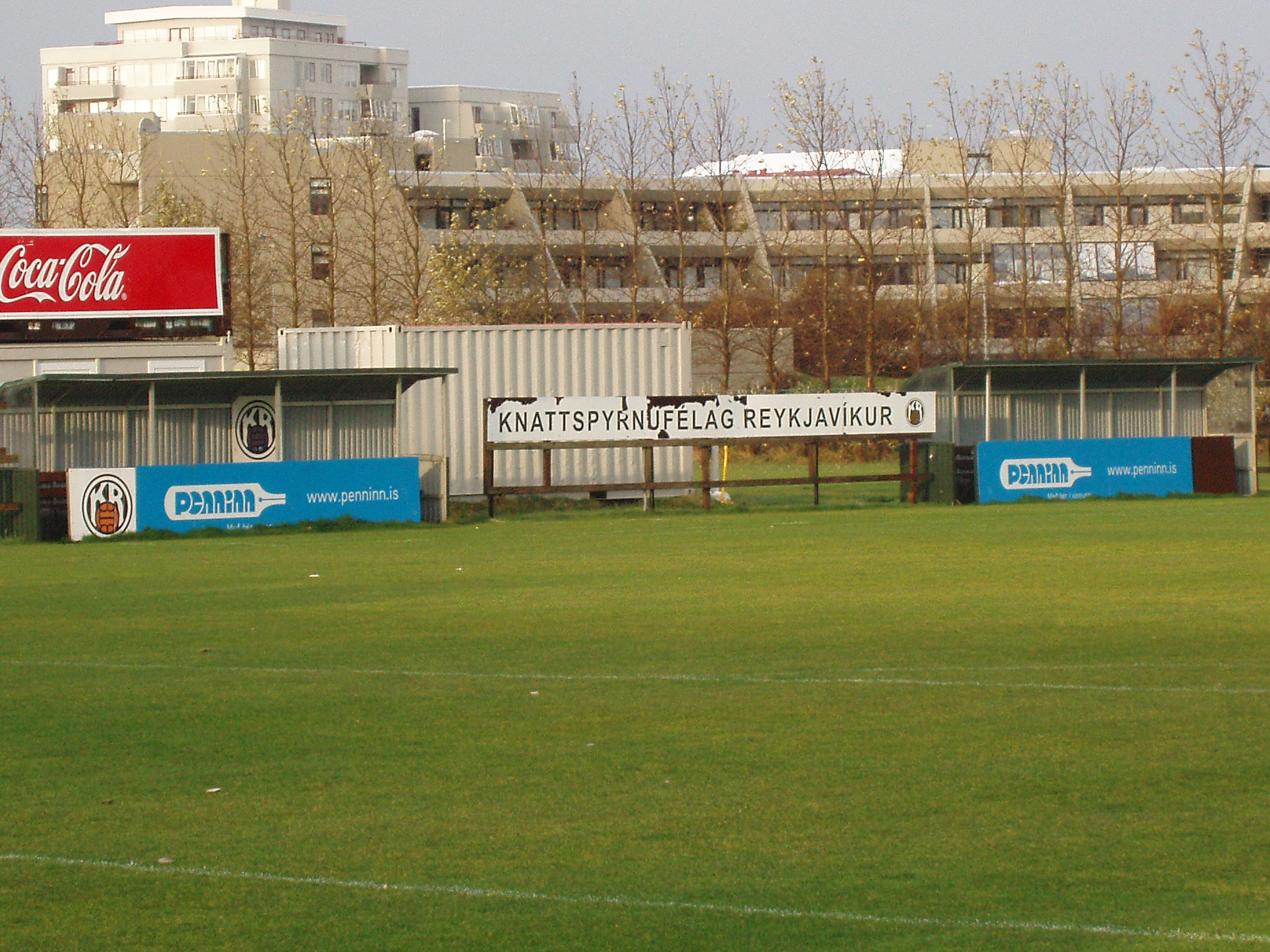
Meistaravellir dugouts opposite main stand in 2011

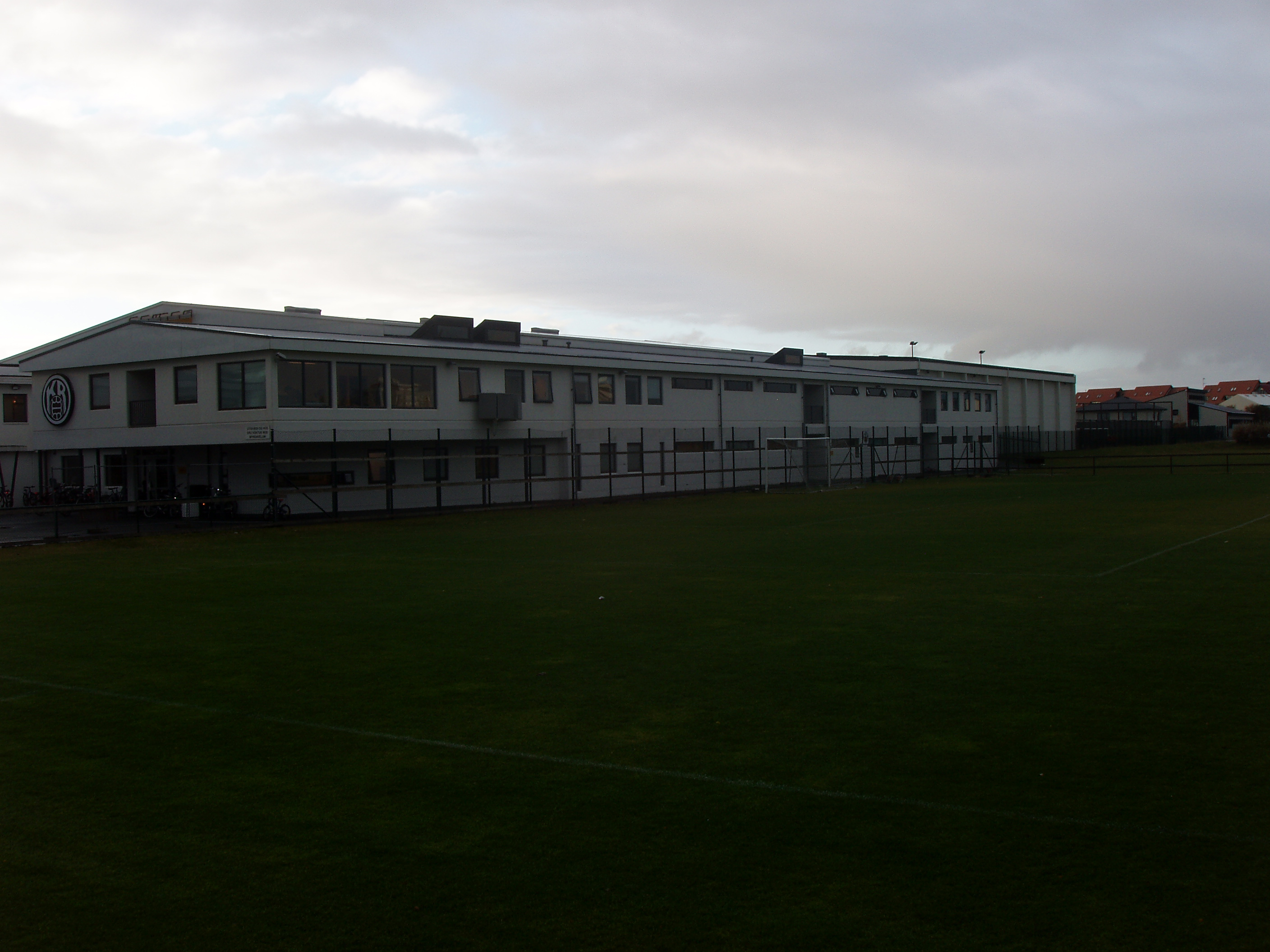
KR home behind one of the goals

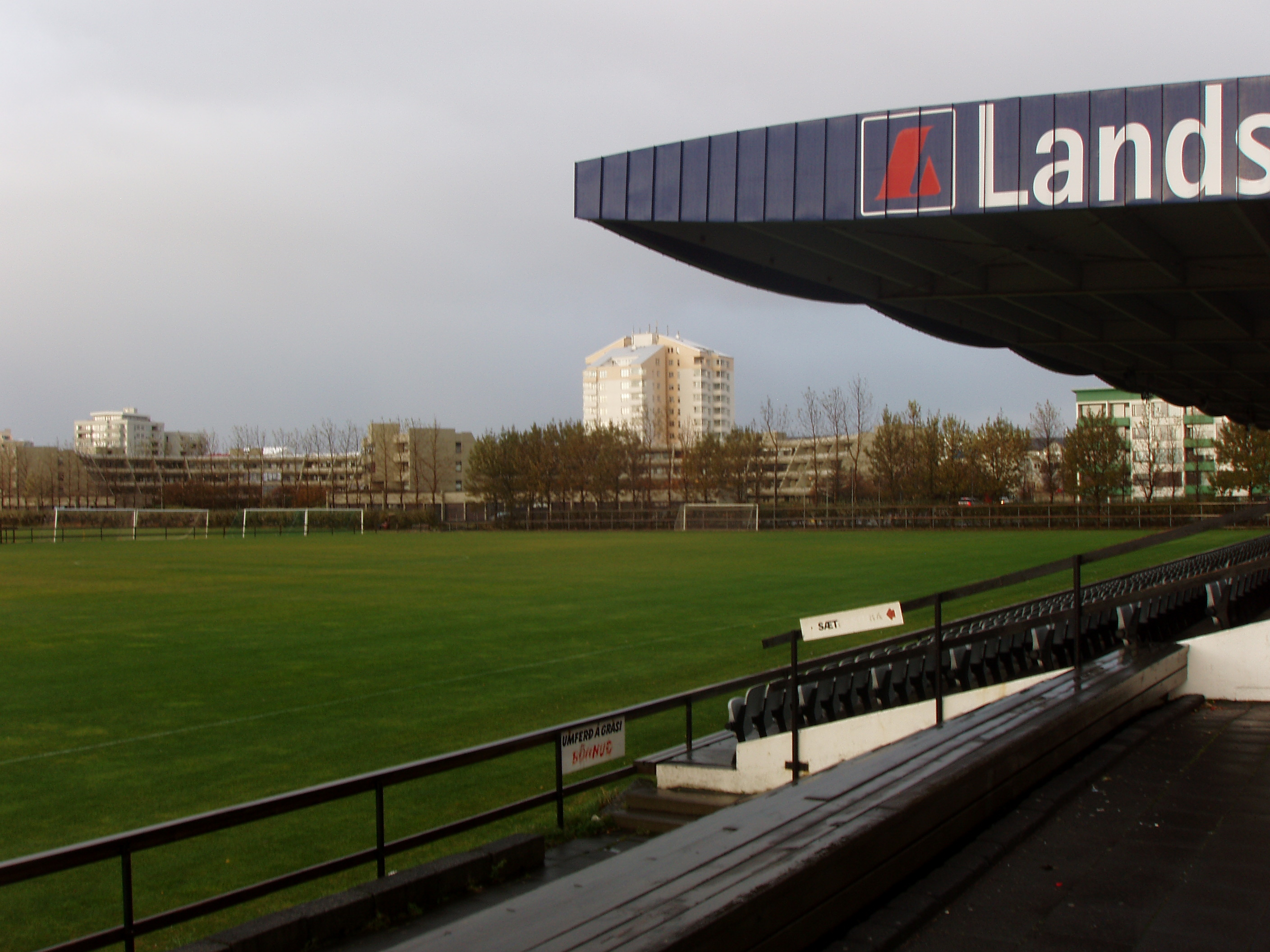
Pitch as seen from next to the Main stand
