= Óskar Örn Hauksson =

Icelandic footballer

Personal information
- Full name: Óskar Örn Hauksson
- Date of birth: 22 August 1984 (age 42)
- Place of birth: Sandgerði, Iceland
- Height: 1.75 m (5 ft 9 in)
- Position: Winger

Team information
- Current team: Víkingur Reykjavík
- Number: 18

Senior career*
Years	Team	Apps	(Gls)
2001–2003	Njarðvík	36	(13)
2003	Sogndal	2	(0)
2004–2006	Grindavík	52	(12)
2007–2021	KR	281	(71)
2012	→ Sandnes Ulf (loan)	8	(0)
2015	→ FC Edmonton (loan)	1	(0)
2022	Stjarnan	25	(3)
2023	Grindavík	16	(7)
2024–	Víkingur	8	(1)

International career^{‡}
2000	Iceland U16	4	(1)
2000	Iceland U17	3	(0)
2001-2002	Iceland U19	6	(1)
2009–2010	Iceland	2	(0)
- * Club domestic league appearances and goals as of 19 May 2024 ‡ National team caps and goals as of 1 May 2021

Óskar Örn Hauksson (born 22 August 1984) is an Icelandic football player, currently playing for Víkingur Reykjavík. He has previously played for Njarðvík, Sogndal, Grindavík, Knattspyrnufélag Reykjavíkur and been on loan to Sandnes Ulf and FC Edmonton. He is the all-time top scorer for KR in the Icelandic top division and was the 2019 Úrvalsdeild Player of the Year when he led KR to his 3rd and the club's 27th league title.
