= 2015 Breiðablik UBK season =

Breiðablik
2015 season
- Manager: Arnar Grétarsson
- Stadium: Kópavogsvöllur
- Úrvalsdeild: 2nd
- Borgunarbikarinn: 15th
- Lengjubikarinn: 1st
- Top goalscorer: League: Jonathan Glenn (8); All: Arnþór Ari Atlason (10)
Home colours	Away colours

The 2015 season was Breiðablik's 30th season in Úrvalsdeild and their 10th consecutive season in top-flight of Icelandic Football.

Along with the Úrvalsdeild, the club competed in the Lengjubikarinn and Borgunarbikarinn.

The 2015 season was Arnar Grétarsson's first season as head coach of Breiðablik after being appointed on 8 November 2014.

On 23 April Breiðablik won the Icelandic league cup, Lengjubikarinn, after a 1–0 win against KA. This was their 2nd Lengjubikar title in the last 3 years.

Breiðablik finished the season in second place in the league only two points behind FH. This earned them a place in the first qualifying round of the 2016–17 Europa League.

== First team ==
As of 23 September 2015. These players competed in Úrvalsdeild, Borgunarbikarinn, Lengjubikarinn

Note: Flags indicate national team as defined under FIFA eligibility rules; some limited exceptions apply. Players may hold more than one non-FIFA nationality.

No.	Pos.	Nation	Player
1	GK	ISL	Gunnleifur Vignir Gunnleifsson (vice captain)
3	MF	ISL	Oliver Sigurjónsson
4	DF	ISL	Damir Muminovic
5	DF	ISL	Elfar Freyr Helgason
6	DF	ISL	Kári Ársælsson
7	MF	ISL	Höskuldur Gunnlaugsson
8	MF	ISL	Arnþór Ari Atlason
10	MF	ISL	Guðjón Pétur Lýðsson
11	MF	ISL	Olgeir Sigurgeirsson
12	GK	ISL	Arnór Bjarki Hafsteinsson
13	FW	ISL	Sólon Breki Leifsson
17	FW	TRI	Jonathan Glenn

No.	Pos.	Nation	Player
20	MF	ISL	Atli Sigurjónsson
21	MF	ISL	Viktor Örn Margeirsson
22	MF	ISL	Ellert Hreinsson
23	DF	ISL	Kristinn Jónsson
24	GK	ISL	Aron Snær Friðriksson
27	FW	ISL	Arnór Gauti Ragnarsson
28	MF	ISL	Davíð Kristján Ólafsson
29	DF	ISL	Arnór Sveinn Aðalsteinsson (captain)
30	MF	ISL	Andri Rafn Yeoman
31	DF	ISL	Guðmundur Friðriksson
33	MF	ISL	Gísli Eyjólfsson
—	MF	ISL	Sölvi Pálsson

== Transfers and loans ==
=== Transfers In ===
Date	Position	No.	Player	From club	Other	Ref
16 October 2014	MF	33	(Iceland) Gísli Eyjólfsson	(Iceland) Haukar	Back from Loan	
16 October 2014	DF	31	(Iceland) Guðmundur Friðriksson	(Iceland) Selfoss	Back from Loan	
16 October 2014	MF	26	(Iceland) Páll Olgeir Þorsteinsson	(Iceland) Víkingur R	Back from Loan	
16 October 2014	MF	21	(Iceland) Viktor Örn Margeirsson	(Iceland) HK	Back from Loan	
16 October 2014	FW	20	(Iceland) Stefán Þór Pálsson	(Iceland) KA	Back from Loan	
1 November 2014	MF	8	(Iceland) Arnþór Ari Atlason	(Iceland) Fram		
10 November 2014	DF	2	(Iceland) Ósvald Jarl Traustason	(Iceland) Fram		
19 December 2014	DF	6	(Iceland) Kári Ársælsson	(Iceland) BÍ/Bolungarvík		
12 March 2015	FW	9	(Bosnia and Herzegovina) Ismar Tandir	(United States) Sacramento Republic		
13 March 2015	DF	23	(Iceland) Kristinn Jónsson	(Sweden) Brommapojkarna	Back from Loan	
14 May 2015	MF	20	(Iceland) Atli Sigurjónsson	(Iceland) KR		
31 July 2015	FW	9	(Norway) Tor André Aasheim	(Norway) FK Haugesund		

=== Transfers Out ===
Date	Position	No.	Player	To club	Other	Ref
16 October 2014	DF	21	(Iceland) Baldvin Sturluson	(Iceland) Stjarnan	Was on Loan	
24 October 2014	MF	8	(Iceland) Finnur Orri Margeirsson	(Iceland) FH		
1 December 2014	FW	20	(Iceland) Stefán Þór Pálsson	(Iceland) Víkingur R		
4 December 2014	DF	6	(Scotland) Jordan Halsman	(Scotland) Cowdenbeath		
29 January 2015	FW	23	(Iceland) Árni Vilhjálmsson	(Norway) Lillestrøm		
1 February 2015	MF	27	(Iceland) Tómas Óli Garðarsson	(Iceland) Valur		
14 February 2015	FW	9	(Iceland) Elfar Árni Aðalsteinsson	(Iceland) KA		
18 March 2015	FW	17	(Iceland) Elvar Páll Sigurðsson	(Iceland) Leiknir R		
19 March 2015	DF	2	(Iceland) Gísli Páll Helgason	(Iceland) Þór		
28 April 2015	MF	26	(Iceland) Páll Olgeir Þorsteinsson	(Iceland) Keflavík		
10 July 2015	FW	9	(Bosnia and Herzegovina) Ismar Tandir		Mutual Consent	
1 September 2015	FW	9	(Norway) Tor André Aasheim	(Norway) FK Haugesund		

=== Loans in ===
Start Date	End Date	Position	No.	Player	From Club	Ref
26 July 2015	16 October 2015	FW	17	(Trinidad and Tobago) Jonathan Glenn	(Iceland) ÍBV	

=== Loans out ===
Start Date	End Date	Position	No.	Player	To Club	Ref
6 May 2015	16 October 2015	GK	36	(Iceland) Hlynur Örn Hlöðversson	(Iceland) Tindastóll	
5 May 2015	16 October 2015	MF	16	(Iceland) Ernir Bjarnason	(Iceland) Fram	
15 May 2015	16 October 2015	DF	2	(Iceland) Ósvald Jarl Traustason	(Iceland) Grótta	
22 July 2015	16 October 2015	FW	19	(Iceland) Gunnlaugur Hlynur Birgisson	(Iceland) Víkingur Ó	
28 July 2015	16 October 2015	DF	17	(Iceland) Alfons Sampsted	(Iceland) Þór	

== Pre-season ==
=== Fótbolti.net Cup ===
Breiðablik took part in the 2015 Fótbolti.net Cup, a pre-season tournament for clubs outside of Reykjavík. The team played in Group 1 along with ÍA, FH and Þróttur R. Breiðablik topped the group with two wins and a draw.

On 4 February 2015 Breiðablik became Fótbolti.net Cup winners after defeating Stjarnan in the final, 2–1. Arnþór Ari Atlason and Arnór Sveinn Aðalsteinsson scored Breiðablik's goals. This was Breiðablik's third Fótbolti.net Cup in four years, having also won in 2012 and 2013.

Date	Round	Opponents	Stadium	Result F–A	Scorers
10 January 2015	Group stage	FH	Fífan	2–1	Arnór Sveinn Aðalsteinsson 40'(p) 84'
17 January 2015	Group stage	ÍA	Fífan	3–0	Ellert Hreinsson ?' Arnþór Ari Atlason ?' Davíð Kristján Ólafsson ?'
20 January 2015	Group stage	Þróttur R	Egilshöll	3–3	Ellert Hreinsson ?' Olgeir Sigurgeirsson ?'(p) ?'
3 February 2015	Final	Stjarnan	Kórinn	2–1	Arnþór Ari Atlason 35' Arnór Sveinn Aðalsteinsson 64'

== Lengjubikarinn ==
Breiðablik were drawn in Group 1 in the 2015 Lengjubikarinn along with FH, Fylkir, ÍBV, Þróttur R, Víkingur Ó, BÍ/Bolungarvík and HK. Their first game was a 0–0 draw against Fylkir on 20 Feb Breiðablik than defeated ÍBV in the second round 2–0 but as Kristinn Jónsson was illegally used by Breiðablik they lost the game 3–0, Kristinn had assisted the first goal and scored the second. In the third round Breiðablik defeated Þróttur R 3–1 with 2 goals from Ellert and 1 from Arnþór Ari. On 19 March Breiðablik defeated HK in the Kópavog's derby 1–0 with a goal from Oliver. Breiðablik won their third game in a row when they defeated Víkingur Ó. 4–1. In the 6th round Breiðablik won FH 3–0. On 2 April Breiðablik secured their place in the quarter-finals by defeating BÍ/Bolungarvík 4–0.

In the quarter-finals Breiðablik defeated Valur 5–1. Höskuldur and Ellert Hreins scored two goals each and Arnþór Ari one.

Breiðablik won Víkingur R in the semi-finals on 19 April 1–0. Arnþór Ari scored the winning goal and his 6th goal of the competition.

On 23 April Breiðablik became the Lengjubikarinn champions after a 1–0 win against KA. Ellert Hreins scored the winning goal on the 6th minute and. Breiðablik controlled the game from the first minute and the win was never in doubt.

Date	Round	Opponents	Stadium	Result F–A	Scorers
20 February 2015	Group stage	Fylkir	Egilshöll	0–0	
9 March 2015	Group stage	ÍBV	Akraneshöllin	0–3	
14 March 2015	Group stage	Þróttur R	Kórinn	3–1	Arnþór Ari Atlason 12' Ellert Hreinsson 15' 41'
19 March 2015	Group stage	HK	Kórinn	1–0	Oliver Sigurjónsson 16'
24 March 2015	Group stage	Víkingur Ó.	Fífan	4–1	Guðjón Pétur 13' Arnþór Ari 63' 81' Ellert Hreins. 67'
28 March 2015	Group stage	FH	Fífan	3–0	Davíð Kristján 7' Arnór Sveinn 36'(p.) 79'(p.)
2 April 2015	Group stage	BÍ/Bolungarvík	Fífan	4–0	Ellert Hreins 58' Ismar Tandir 72' Olgeir 82' Arnþór Ari 88'
16 April 2015	Quarter-finals	Valur	Fífan	5–1	Arnþór Ari 18' Höskuldur 55' 68' Ellert Hreins 59' 61'
19 April 2015	Semi-finals	Víkingur R	Víkingsvöllur	1–0	Arnþór Ari 19'
23 April 2015	Final	KA	Kórinn	1–0	Ellert Hreins 6'

== Úrvalsdeild ==
=== League table ===
Pos	Team	Pld	W	D	L	GF	GA	GD	Pts	Qualification or relegation
1	FH (C)	22	15	3	4	47	26	+21	48	Qualification for the Champions League second qualifying round
2	Breiðablik	22	13	7	2	34	13	+21	46	Qualification for the Europa League first qualifying round
3	KR	22	12	6	4	36	21	+15	42	Qualification for the Europa League first qualifying round
4	Stjarnan	22	9	6	7	32	24	+8	33	
5	Valur	22	9	6	7	38	31	+7	33	Qualification for the Europa League first qualifying round (Note: Valur qualified for the UEFA Europa League first qualifying round by winning the 2015 Icelandic Cup.)

Source: KSÍ, Soccerway
Rules for classification: 1) Points; 2) Goal difference; 3) Goals scored; 4) Head-to-head points; 5) Head-to-head goal difference; 6) Head-to-head goals scored; 7) Head-to-head away goals scored; 8) Play-off (only for deciding champion); 9) Draw.
(C) Champions

=== Matches ===
Win Draw Loss Upcoming fixture

7 May 2015 1	Fylkir	1–1	Breiðablik	Reykjavík
19:15 GMT	Albert Brynjar Ingason 39'; Ásgeir Eyþórsson (yellow card) 62'; Jóhannes Karl Guðjónsson (yellow card) 69'	Report	Guðjón Pétur Lýðsson 48' (pen.); Arnór Sveinn Aðalsteinsson (yellow card) 69'	Stadium: Fylkisvöllur; Attendance: 2220; Referee: Gunnar Jarl Jónsson

11 May 2015 2	Breiðablik	2–2	KR	Kópavogur
19:15 GMT	Höskuldur Gunnlaugsson 10'; Guðjón Pétur Lýðsson 71' (yellow card) 86'; Damir Muminovic (yellow card) 65'	Report	Søren Frederiksen 70'; Óskar Örn Hauksson 45+1'; Gonzalo Balbi (yellow card) 85'	Stadium: Kópavogsvöllur; Attendance: 1945; Referee: Valgeir Valgeirsson

17 May 2015 3	Keflavík	1–1	Breiðablik	Keflavík
20:00 GMT	Sigurbergur Elísson 49'; Unnar Már Unnarsson (yellow card) 63'; Einar Orri Einarsson (yellow card) 77'; Hólmar Örn Rúnarsson (yellow card) 78'	Report	Guðjón Pétur Lýðsson 90+3'; Guðmundur Friðriksson (yellow card) 45+1'; Damir Muminovic (yellow card) 55'; Elfar Freyr Helgason (yellow card) 90+3'	Stadium: Nettóvöllurinn; Attendance: 967; Referee: Vilhjálmur Alvar Þórarinsson

20 May 2015 4	Breiðablik	1–0	Valur	Kópavogur
19:15 GMT	Höskuldur Gunnlaugsson 81'	Report	Haukur Páll Sigurðsson (yellow card) 14'; Andri Fannar Stefánsson (yellow card) 71'	Stadium: Kópavogsvöllur; Attendance: 1246; Referee: Erlendur Eiríksson

26 May 2015 5	ÍA	0–1	Breiðablik	Akranes
19:15 GMT	Marko Andelkovic (yellow card) 48'	Report	Arnþór Ari Atlason 68'	Stadium: Norðurálsvöllurinn; Attendance: 1050; Referee: Þóroddur Hjaltalín

31 May 2015 6	Breiðablik	3–0	Stjarnan	Kópavogur
19:15 GMT	Guðjón Pétur Lýðsson 12' (pen.) (yellow card) 42'; Arnþór Ari Atlason 15'; Elfar Freyr Helgason 37'	Report	Arnar Már Björgvinsson (yellow card) 2'; Heiðar Ægisson (yellow card) 65'	Stadium: Kópavogsvöllur; Attendance: 1638; Referee: Þorvaldur Árnason

7 June 2015 7	Leiknir R	0–2	Breiðablik	Reykjavík
19:15 GMT	Atli Arnarson (yellow card) 47'	Report	Ellert Hreinsson 45'; Atli Sigurjónsson 79'; Damir Muminovic (yellow card) 23'; Elfar Freyr Helgason (yellow card) 84'	Stadium: Leiknisvöllur; Attendance: 1150; Referee: Valgeir Valgeirsson

14 June 2015 8	Breiðablik	4–1	Víkingur R	Kópavogur
19:15 GMT	Kristinn Jónsson 15' 27'; Höskuldur Gunnlaugsson 57'; Ellert Hreinsson 86'; Atli Sigurjónsson (yellow card) 92'	Report	Rolf Toft 50'	Stadium: Kópavogsvöllur; Attendance: 1386; Referee: Garðar Örn Hinriksson

21 June 2015 9	FH	1–1	Breiðablik	Hafnarfjörður
20:00 GMT	Kassim Doumbia 93'; Þórarinn Ingi Valdimarsson (yellow card) 35'; Böðvar Böðvarsson (yellow card) 65'; Jón Ragnar Jónsson (yellow card) 82'; Bjarni Þór Viðarsson (red card) 91'	Report	Arnþór Ari Atlason 69'; Guðjón Pétur Lýðsson (yellow card) 79'	Stadium: Kaplakrikavöllur; Attendance: 2843; Referee: Gunnar Jarl Jónsson

28 June 2015 10	ÍBV	2–0	Breiðablik	Vestmannaeyjar
17:00 GMT	Jonathan Ricardo Glenn 72'; Víðir Þorvarðarson 74'; Mees Siers (yellow card) 18'; Hafsteinn Briem (yellow card) 76'; Avni Pepa (yellow card) 92'	Report	Arnór Sveinn Aðalsteinsson (yellow card) 45'; Atli Sigurjónsson (yellow card) 75'; Guðjón Pétur Lýðsson (yellow card) 79'	Stadium: Hásteinsvöllur; Attendance: 655; Referee: Erlendur Eiríksson

13 July 2015 11	Breiðablik	2–0	Fjölnir	Kópavogur
20:00 GMT	Oliver Sigurjónsson 38' (yellow card) 86'; Arnór Sveinn Aðalsteinsson 70'	Report	Guðmundur Böðvar Guðjónsson (yellow card) 14'	Stadium: Kópavogsvöllur; Attendance: 1235; Referee: Ívar Orri Kristjánsson

20 July 2015 12	Breiðablik	0–1	Fylkir	Kópavogur
19:15 GMT	Damir Muminovic (yellow card) 90'	Report	Albert Brynjar Ingason 70' (yellow card) 53'; Ragnar Bragi Sveinsson (yellow card) 49'; Jóhannes Karl Guðjónsson (yellow card) 73'; Hákon Ingi Jónsson (yellow card) 82'; Andrés Már Jóhannesson (yellow card) 90'	Stadium: Kópavogsvöllur; Attendance: 1320; Referee: Garðar Örn Hinriksson

27 July 2015 13	KR	0–0	Breiðablik	Reykjavík
20:00 GMT	Þorsteinn Már Ragnarsson (yellow card) 32'	Report	Elfar Freyr Helgason (yellow card) 19'	Stadium: Alvogenvöllurinn; Attendance: 2250; Referee: Þorvaldur Árnason

5 August 2015 14	Breiðablik	4–0	Keflavík	Kópavogur
19:15 GMT	Jonathan Glenn 42'; Höskuldur Gunnlaugsson 44' 67'; Arnþór Ari Atlason 50'	Report	Bojan Stefán Ljubicic (yellow card) 64'; Frans Elvarsson (yellow card) 65'; Einar Orri Einarsson (yellow card) 66'; Sindri Snær Magnússon (yellow card) 72'	Stadium: Kópavogsvöllur; Attendance: 1128; Referee: Garðar Örn Hinriksson

10 August 2015 15	Valur	0–1	Breiðablik	Reykjavík
19:15 GMT	Haukur Páll Sigurðsson (yellow card) 32'; Thomas Guldborg Christensen (yellow card) 87'; Sigurður Egill Lárusson (yellow card) 90+5'	Report	Jonathan Glenn 38'; Arnór Sveinn Aðalsteinsson (yellow card) 34'; Oliver Sigurjónsson (yellow card) 53'; Atli Sigurjónsson (yellow card) 89'; Höskuldur Gunnlaugsson (yellow card) 90+2'	Stadium: Laugardalsvöllur; Attendance: 992; Referee: Vilhjálmur Alvar Þórarinsson

17 August 2015 16	Breiðablik	3–1	ÍA	Kópavogur
18:00 GMT	Jonathan Glenn 47' 88' 90+3'	Report	Albert Hafsteinsson 84'; Ingimar Elí Hlynsson (yellow card) 69'	Stadium: Kópavogsvöllur; Attendance: 1725; Referee: Valdimar Pálsson

24 August 2015 17	Stjarnan	0–1	Breiðablik	Garðabær
20:00 GMT	Daníel Laxdal (yellow card) 90+2'	Report	Jonathan Glenn 43' (yellow card) 68'; Oliver Sigurjónsson (yellow card) 25'; Arnór Sveinn Aðalsteinsson (yellow card) 84'	Stadium: Samsung völlurinn Attendance: 1156; Referee: Vilhjálmur Alvar Þórarinsson

30 August 2015 18	Breiðablik	0–0	Leiknir R.	Kópavogur
18:00 GMT	Atli Sigurjónsson (yellow card) 83'; Jonathan Glenn (yellow card) 90+2'	Report	Ólafur Hrannar Kristjánsson (yellow card) 85'; Daði Bergsson (yellow card) 85'; Kristján Páll Jónsson (yellow card) 90+1'	Stadium: Kópavogsvöllur; Attendance: 1435; Referee: Þorvaldur Árnason

13 September 2015 19	Víkingur R.	2–2	Breiðablik	Reykjavík
17:00 GMT	Vladimir Tufegdzic 47' (yellow card) 54'; Ívar Örn Jónsson 89' (pen.); Alan Lowing (yellow card) 24'; Arnþór Ingi Kristinsson (yellow card) 78'; Hallgrímur Mar Steingrímsson (yellow card) 90+4'	Report	Oliver Sigurjónsson 18'; Höskuldur Gunnlaugsson 71'; Arnór Sveinn Aðalsteinsson (yellow card) 57'	Stadium: Víkingsvöllur; Attendance: 953; Referee: Erlendur Eiríksson

20 September 2015 20	Breiðablik	2–1	FH	Kópavogur
16:30 GMT	Jonathan Glenn 74'; Damir Muminovic 77' (yellow card) 36'; Arnþór Ari Atlason (yellow card) 50'; Oliver Sigurjónsson (yellow card) 90+4'	Report	Atli Guðnason 72'; Pétur Viðarsson (yellow card) 40'; Jonathan Hendrickx (yellow card) 85'; Kristján Flóki Finnbogason (yellow card) 90+1'; Davíð Þór Viðarsson (yellow card) 90+3'	Stadium: Kópavogsvöllur; Attendance: 1643; Referee: Þorvaldur Árnason

26 September 2015 21	Breiðablik	1–0	ÍBV	Kópavogur
14:00 GMT	Atli Sigurjónsson 51'; Elfar Freyr Helgason (yellow card) 54'	Report	Mees Siers (yellow card) 16'	Stadium: Kópavogsvöllur; Attendance: 410; Referee: Garðar Örn Hinriksson

3 October 2015 22	Fjölnir	0–2	Breiðablik	Reykjavík
14:00 GMT	Atli Már Þorbergsson (yellow card) 8'; Þórir Guðjónsson (yellow card) 66'; Jonatan Neftali Diez Gonzales (yellow card) 72'	Report	Jonathan Glenn 20' (red card); Andri Rafn Yeoman 90+5'; Atli Sigurjónsson (yellow card) 90+2'	Stadium: Fjölnisvöllur; Attendance: 560; Referee: Valdimar Pálsson

=== Results ===
Overall								Home						Away					
Pld	W	D	L	GF	GA	GD	Pts	W	D	L	GF	GA	GD	W	D	L	GF	GA	GD
22	13	7	2	34	13	+21	46	8	2	1	22	6	+16	5	5	1	12	7	+5

Last updated: 3 October 2015.
Source: KSÍ

=== Points breakdown ===
- Points at home: 26
- Points away from home: 20
- 6 Points: Valur, ÍA, Stjarnan, Fjölnir
- 4 Points: Keflavík, Leiknir R., Víkingur R., FH
- 3 Points: ÍBV
- 2 Points: KR
- 1 Point: Fylkir
- 0 Points:

== Borgunarbikarinn ==
Breiðablik came into the Icelandic cup, Borgunarbikarinn, in the 32nd-finals and were drawn against KFG. KR won the game 1–3. In the 16th-finals the team was drawn against KA. Breiðablik lost the game 1–0 after extra time.

Win Draw Loss Upcoming fixture

4 June 2015 32nd-finals	KFG	1–3	Breiðablik	Garðabær
19:15 GMT	Hákon Atli Bryde 73'; Arnar Þór Ingason (yellow card) 56'	Report	Arnór Gauti Ragnarsson 41'; Own goal 84'; Höskuldur Gunnlaugsson 92'	Stadium: Samsung völlurinn Attendance: 252; Referee: Leiknir Ágústsson

18 June 2015 16th-finals	Breiðablik	0–1 (a.e.t.)	KA	Kópavogur
19:15 GMT		Report	Ævar Ingi Jóhannesson 98'; Jóhann Helgason (yellow card) 59'; Ben Everson (yellow card) 93'	Stadium: Kópavogsvöllur; Attendance: 436; Referee: Vilhjálmur Alvar Þórarinsson

== Squad statistics ==
=== Goalscorers ===
Includes all competitive matches.

As of match played 3 October 2015

Rank	Pos.	No.	Player	Úrvalsdeild	Borgunarbikar	Lengjubikar	Total
1	MF	8	(Iceland) Arnþór Ari Atlason	4	0	6	10
2	MF	22	(Iceland) Ellert Hreinsson	2	0	7	9
3	MF	7	(Iceland) Höskuldur Gunnlaugsson	6	1	2	9
4	FW	17	(Trinidad and Tobago) Jonathan Glenn	8	0	0	8
5	MF	10	(Iceland) Guðjón Pétur Lýðsson	4	0	1	5
6	DF	29	(Iceland) Arnór Sveinn Aðalsteinsson	1	0	2	3
7	MF	3	(Iceland) Oliver Sigurjónsson	2	0	1	3
8	DF	23	(Iceland) Kristinn Jónsson	2	0	0	2
9	MF	20	(Iceland) Atli Sigurjónsson	2	0	0	2
10	MF	28	(Iceland) Davíð Kristján Ólafsson	0	0	1	1
11	MF	11	(Iceland) Olgeir Sigurgeirsson	0	0	1	1
12	FW	9	(Bosnia and Herzegovina) Ismar Tandir	0	0	1	1
13	DF	5	(Iceland) Elfar Freyr Helgason	1	0	0	1
14	FW	27	(Iceland) Arnór Gauti Ragnarsson	0	1	0	1
15	DF	4	(Iceland) Damir Muminovic	1	0	0	1
16	MF	30	(Iceland) Andri Rafn Yeoman	1	0	0	1

=== Appearances ===
Includes all competitive matches. Numbers in parentheses are sub appearances

As of match played 3 October 2015

No.	Pos.	Player	Úrvalsdeild	Borgunarbikar	Lengjubikar	Total
1	GK	(Iceland) Gunnleifur Gunnleifsson	22	2	10	34
2	DF	(Iceland) Ósvald Jarl Traustason	0	0	(4)	4
3	MF	(Iceland) Oliver Sigurjónsson	19	0	4 (4)	27
4	DF	(Iceland) Damir Muminovic	21	(1)	9 (1)	32
5	DF	(Iceland) Elfar Freyr Helgason	21	1	8	30
6	DF	(Iceland) Kári Ársælsson	(3)	1	2 (1)	7
7	MF	(Iceland) Höskuldur Gunnlaugsson	19 (1)	(2)	9	30
8	MF	(Iceland) Arnþór Ari Atlason	19 (2)	1 (1)	9 (1)	32
9	FW	(Bosnia and Herzegovina) Ismar Tandir	(2)	1	2 (3)	8
10	MF	(Iceland) Guðjón Pétur Lýðsson	17 (3)	(1)	4 (6)	31
11	MF	(Iceland) Olgeir Sigurgeirsson	(10)	1	(9)	20
13	FW	(Iceland) Sólon Breki Leifsson	(4)	(1)	(1)	6
16	MF	(Iceland) Ernir Bjarnason	0	0	(2)	2
17	FW	(Trinidad and Tobago) Jonathan Glenn	8 (1)	0	0	9
19	FW	(Iceland) Gunnlaugur Hlynur Birgisson	2	2	6 (3)	13
20	MF	(Iceland) Atli Sigurjónsson	8 (11)	2	0	21
21	MF	(Iceland) Viktor Örn Margeirsson	2	2	2 (1)	7
22	MF	(Iceland) Ellert Hreinsson	18 (2)	1	8 (1)	29
23	DF	(Iceland) Kristinn Jónsson	22	1	7 (1)	31
24	GK	(Iceland) Aron Snær Friðriksson	0	0	(1)	1
27	FW	(Iceland) Arnór Gauti Ragnarsson	(2)	1	(1)	4
28	MF	(Iceland) Davíð Kristján Ólafsson	4 (5)	2	10	21
29	DF	(Iceland) Arnór Sveinn Aðalsteinsson	19	1	10	30
30	MF	(Iceland) Andri Rafn Yeoman	17 (5)	1	7 (1)	31
31	DF	(Iceland) Guðmundur Friðriksson	3 (4)	1	2	10
33	MF	(Iceland) Gísli Eyjólfsson	1 (4)	0	0	5
	DF	(Iceland) Alfons Sampsted	0	1	1	2
	MF	(Iceland) Sölvi Pálsson	0	0	(1)	1
	FW	(Iceland) Elvar Páll Sigurðsson	0	0	(2)	2

=== Disciplinary record ===
Includes all competitive matches.

As of match played 3 October 2015

No.	Pos.	Player	Úrvalsdeild			Borgunarbikar			Lengjubikar			Total		
No.	Pos.	Player	Yellow card	Second yellow card	Red card	Yellow card	Second yellow card	Red card	Yellow card	Second yellow card	Red card	Yellow card	Second yellow card	Red card
3	MF	(Iceland) Oliver Sigurjónsson	4	0	0	0	0	0	3	0	0	7	0	0
4	DF	(Iceland) Damir Muminovic	5	0	0	0	0	0	3	0	0	8	0	0
5	DF	(Iceland) Elfar Freyr Helgason	4	0	0	0	0	0	1	0	0	5	0	0
7	MF	(Iceland) Höskuldur Gunnlaugsson	1	0	0	0	0	0	0	0	0	1	0	0
8	MF	(Iceland) Arnþór Ari Atlason	1	0	0	0	0	0	1	0	0	2	0	0
10	MF	(Iceland) Guðjón Pétur Lýðsson	4	0	0	0	0	0	0	0	0	4	0	0
17	FW	(Trinidad and Tobago) Jonathan Glenn	2	0	1	0	0	0	0	0	0	2	0	1
19	FW	(Iceland) Gunnlaugur Hlynur Birgisson	0	0	0	0	0	0	2	0	0	2	0	0
20	MF	(Iceland) Atli Sigurjónsson	5	0	0	0	0	0	0	0	0	5	0	0
22	MF	(Iceland) Ellert Hreinsson	0	0	0	0	0	0	3	0	0	3	0	0
23	DF	(Iceland) Kristinn Jónsson	0	0	0	0	0	0	1	0	0	1	0	0
29	DF	(Iceland) Arnór Sveinn Aðalsteinsson	5	0	0	0	0	0	3	0	0	8	0	0
31	DF	(Iceland) Guðmundur Friðriksson	1	0	0	0	0	0	0	0	0	1	0	0
