= 2014 Breiðablik UBK season =

Breiðablik
2014 season
- Manager: Ólafur Kristjánsson (until 2 July 2014); Guðmundur Benediktsson (Interim head coach)
- Stadium: Kópavogsvöllur
- Úrvalsdeild: 7th
- Borgunarbikarinn: 16th-finals
- Lengjubikarinn: 2nd
- Top goalscorer: League: Árni Vilhjálmsson (10); All: Árni Vilhjálmsson (17)
Home colours	Away colours

The 2014 season was Breiðablik's 29th season in Úrvalsdeild and their 9th consecutive season in top-flight of Icelandic Football.

After 8 years as head coach of Breiðablik Ólafur Kristjánsson signed as manager of FC Nordsjælland on 2 July, he left the club after the Stjarnan game on 2 June. He was replaced by his assistant coach Guðmundur Benediktsson 6 league games into the season.

On 25 April Breiðablik finished 2nd in Lengjubikarinn, losing the final 4–1 to FH.

Despite their good pre-season and finishing 2nd in Lengjubikarinn Breiðablik struggled in the league and went 9 league games without a victory. Their first league victory came on 2 July against Þór. Breiðablik finished the season in 7th place, their lowest finish since 2008, with 12 draws in 22 games.

Breiðablik were eliminated in the quarter-finals of Borgunarbikarinn on 6 July to eventual winners KR after beating HK and Þór in the 32nd-finals and 16th-finals.

On 13 October former Breiðablik's player Arnar Grétarsson was confirmed as the new head coach of Breiðablik following the departure of Guðmundur Benediktsson.

== First team ==
As of 18 October 2014. These players competed in Úrvalsdeild, Borgunarbikarinn, Lengjubikarinn

Note: Flags indicate national team as defined under FIFA eligibility rules; some limited exceptions apply. Players may hold more than one non-FIFA nationality.

No.	Pos.	Nation	Player
1	GK	ISL	Gunnleifur Vignir Gunnleifsson (vice captain)
2	DF	ISL	Gísli Páll Helgason
3	MF	ISL	Oliver Sigurjónsson
4	DF	ISL	Damir Muminovic
5	DF	ISL	Elfar Freyr Helgason
6	DF	SCO	Jordan Halsman
7	MF	ISL	Stefán Gíslason
8	MF	ISL	Finnur Orri Margeirsson (captain)
9	FW	ISL	Elfar Árni Aðalsteinsson
10	MF	ISL	Guðjón Pétur Lýðsson
11	MF	ISL	Olgeir Sigurgeirsson
12	GK	ISL	Arnór Bjarki Hafsteinsson
14	MF	ISL	Höskuldur Gunnlaugsson
16	MF	ISL	Ernir Bjarnason

No.	Pos.	Nation	Player
17	FW	ISL	Elvar Páll Sigurðsson
19	FW	ISL	Gunnlaugur Hlynur Birgisson
20	FW	ISL	Stefán Þór Pálsson (Joined KA in May on loan)
21	DF	ISL	Guðmundur Friðriksson (Joined Selfoss in July on loan)
21	DF	ISL	Baldvin Sturluson
22	MF	ISL	Ellert Hreinsson
23	FW	ISL	Árni Vilhjálmsson
26	DF	ISL	Páll Olgeir Þorsteinsson (Joined Víkingur in July on loan)
27	MF	ISL	Tómas Óli Garðarsson
28	MF	ISL	Davíð Kristján Ólafsson
29	DF	ISL	Arnór Sveinn Aðalsteinsson
30	MF	ISL	Andri Rafn Yeoman
33	MF	ISL	Gísli Eyjólfsson (Joined Haukar in May on loan)
—	DF	ISL	Ingiberg Ólafur Jónsson (Joined Fram in April)

=== Transfers in ===
Date	Position	No.	Player	From club	Ref
6 December 2013	DF	4	(Iceland) (Slovenia) Damir Muminovic	(Iceland) Víkingur Ó	
13 January 2014	DF	29	(Iceland) Arnór Sveinn Aðalsteinsson	(Norway) Hønefoss BK	
27 January 2014	DF	6	(Scotland) Jordan Halsman	(Iceland) Fram	
31 January 2014	MF	7	(Iceland) Stefán Gíslason	(Belgium) OH Leuven	
17 July 2014	FW	19	(Iceland) Gunnlaugur Hlynur Birgisson	(Belgium) Club Brugge	
23 July 2014	MF	3	(Iceland) Oliver Sigurjónsson	(Denmark) AGF	

=== Transfers out ===
Date	Position	No.	Player	To Club	Ref
26 October 2013	DF		(Iceland) Ósvald Jarl Traustason	(Iceland) Fram	
5 November 2013	MF	5	(Iceland) Sindri Snær Magnússon	(Iceland) Keflavík	
6 November 2013	MF	17	(Iceland) Jökull I Elísabetarson	(Iceland) ÍBV	
27 November 2013	FW	21	(Iceland) Atli Fannar Jónsson	(Iceland) ÍBV	
10 December 2013	DF	15	(Iceland) Sverrir Ingi Ingason	(Norway) Viking FK	
23 December 2013	GK		(Iceland) Vignir Jóhannesson	(Iceland) Selfoss	
31 December 2013	FW	20	(Denmark) Nichlas Rohde	(Denmark) FC Nordsjælland	Loan Ends
16 January 2014	DF	4	(Netherlands) Renee G. Troost	(Netherlands) Rijnsburgse Boys	
30 January 2014	DF	7	(Iceland) Þórður Steinar Hreiðarsson	(Switzerland) FC Locarno	
1 February 2014	MF	18	(Iceland) Arnar Már Björgvinsson	(Iceland) Stjarnan	
5 April 2014	MF	16	(Iceland) Viggó Kristjánsson	(Iceland) Grótta	
10 April 2014	DF		(Iceland) Ingiberg Ólafur Jónsson	(Iceland) Fram	

=== Loans in ===
Start Date	End Date	Position	No.	Player	From Club	Ref
24 July 2014	16 October 2014	DF	21	(Iceland) Baldvin Sturluson	(Iceland) Stjarnan	

=== Loans out ===
Start Date	End Date	Position	No.	Player	To Club	Ref
1 January 2014	31 December 2014	DF	19	(Iceland) Kristinn Jónsson	(Sweden) IF Brommapojkarna	
9 May 2014	16 October 2014	MF	33	(Iceland) Gísli Eyjólfsson	(Iceland) Haukar	
16 May 2014	16 October 2014	FW	20	(Iceland) Stefán Þór Pálsson	(Iceland) KA	
25 July 2014	16 October 2014	DF	26	(Iceland) Páll Olgeir Þorsteinsson	(Iceland) Víkingur	
30 July 2014	16 October 2014	DF	21	(Iceland) Guðmundur Friðriksson	(Iceland) Selfoss	

== Pre-season ==
=== Fótbolti.net Cup ===
Breiðablik took part in Fótbolti.net Cup, a pre-season tournament for clubs outside of Reykjavík, in January. The team played in Group 1 with FH, Keflavík and Grindavík. Breiðablik played 4 games, won 2 and lost 2. The team won ÍBV in the game for 5th place.

Date	Round	Opponents	Stadium	Result F–A	Scorers
10 January 2014	Group stage	Keflavík	Reykjaneshöllin	4–2	Árni Vill 29' 42' Davíð Kristján 33' Andri Rafn 77'
19 January 2014	Group stage	Grindavík	Fífan	2–3	Árni Vill 58' Finnur Orri 72'
25 January 2014	Group stage	FH	Fífan	0–3	
31 January 2014	5th place final	ÍBV	Kórinn	3–1	Stefán Þór 12' Ellert Hreins 69' Guðjón Pétur 73' (pen.)

=== Atlantic Cup ===
Breiðablik took part, for the first time, in The Atlantic Cup held in Algarve, Portugal, a pre-season friendly tournament contested of 8 teams from 6 countries. The team played 3 games, 1 win 1 draw 1 loss, against SV Mattersburg, FC Midtjylland and F.C. Copenhagen and finished in 5th place. FH were the other Icelandic team in the tournament.

Date	Opponents	Stadium	Result F–A	Scorers
4 February 2014	SV Mattersburg	Estádio Albufeira	1–1	Guðjón Pétur 23'(pen.)
7 February 2014	FC Midtjylland	Estádio da Nora	2–1	Árni Vill 50' Elfar Árni 59'
10 February	F.C. Copenhagen	Estádio Algarve	0–2	

Pos	Team	Pld	W	D	L	GF	GA	GD	Pts
1	(Denmark) F.C. Copenhagen	3	3	0	0	11	0	+11	9
2	(Sweden) Örebro SK	3	3	0	0	8	2	+6	9
3	(Russia) FC Spartak Moscow	3	2	0	1	5	7	−2	6
4	(Iceland) Breiðablik UBK	3	1	1	1	3	4	-1	5
5	(Austria) SV Mattersburg	3	1	1	1	6	5	+1	4
6	(Czech Republic) FC Slovan Liberec	3	1	0	2	2	7	−5	3
7	(Denmark) FC Midtjylland	3	0	0	3	3	6	−3	0
8	(Iceland) FH Hafnarfjarðar	3	0	0	3	4	11	−7	0

== Lengjubikarinn ==
Lengjubikarinn, the Icelandic league cup, was held from 14 February to 25 April. It was played in 3 groups and Breiðablik were drawn in Group 1 along with 7 other teams. Breiðablik finished in 2nd place in the group and went on to play in the quarter-finals where they beat Víkingur. In the semi-finals they beat Þór but lost in the finals to FH thus getting the silver.

=== Matches ===
Date	Round	Opponents	Stadium	Result F–A	Scorers
18 February 2014	Group stage	Grindavík	Kórinn	2–1	Páll Olgeir 34' Tómas Óli 81'
22 February 2014	Group stage	BÍ/Bolungarvík	Fífan	1–1	Árni Vill 20'
8 March 2014	Group stage	Fram	Fífan	4–3	Finnur Orri 5' 79' Tómas Óli 17' 40'
15 March 2014	Group stage	Keflavík	Reykjaneshöllin	2–1	Guðjón Pétur 16' (pen.) Stefán Gísla 50'
22 March 2014	Group stage	KR	Fífan	0–0	
29 March 2014	Group stage	ÍA	Akraneshöllin	2–2	Guðjón Pétur 19' (pen.) Finnur Orri 26'
12 April 2014	Group stage	Afturelding	Fífan	4–0	Árni Vill 32' 52' 54' Elvar Páll 86'
16 April 2014	Quarter-finals	Víkingur	Fífan	1–0	Elfar Árni 76'
21 April 2014	Semi-finals	Þór	Boginn	2–1	Guðjón Pétur 10' Árni Vill 27'
25 April 2014	Finals	FH	Samsung-völlurinn	1–4	Gísli Eyjólfsson '79

== Úrvalsdeild ==
Breiðablik started the season on 5 May with a game against FH. The game ended with a 1–1 draw and from their Breiðablik started too struggle. They only took 6 points from their first 9 games, 6 draws and 3 defeats. Ólafur Kristjánsson's last game in charge was against Stjarnan on 2 June, game that ended with a 1–1 draw and Ólafur left Breiðablik without a league win in 2014 season. Their first win came on 2 July against Þór, that was Guðmundur Benediktsson first league win as head coach of Breiðablik. After collecting 12 points in the first half of the season from 11 games (2 wins, 6 draws, 3 defeats), the team improved slightly in the second half off the season and only lost 2 games of the last 13, but too many draws, 12 in total, left the team only securing safety in the 20th round. Breiðablik finished the season in 7th place only 3 points shy of 4th place which gave Europa League Qualification after KR's win in Borgunarbikarinn.

=== Table ===
Pos	Team	Pld	W	D	L	GF	GA	GD	Pts	Qualification or relegation
1	Stjarnan (C)	22	15	7	0	42	21	+21	52	Qualification for the Champions League second qualifying round
2	FH	22	15	6	1	46	17	+29	51	Qualification for the Europa League first qualifying round (Note: The 2014 Icelandic Cup winner, KR, qualifies for 2015–16 UEFA Europa League first qualifying round.)
3	KR	22	13	4	5	40	24	+16	43	Qualification for the Europa League first qualifying round
4	Víkingur Reykjavík	22	9	3	10	25	29	−4	30	Qualification for the Europa League first qualifying round
5	Valur	22	8	4	10	31	36	−5	28	
6	Fylkir	22	8	4	10	34	40	−6	28	
7	Breiðablik	22	5	12	5	36	33	+3	27	
8	Keflavík	22	6	7	9	29	32	−3	25	
9	Fjölnir	22	5	8	9	33	36	−3	23	
10	ÍBV	22	5	7	10	28	38	−10	22	
11	Fram (R)	22	6	3	13	30	48	−18	21	Relegation to 1. deild karla
12	Þór A. (R)	22	3	3	16	24	44	−20	12	Relegation to 1. deild karla

Source: KSÍ
Rules for classification: 1) points; 2) goal difference; 3) number of goals scored.
(C) Champions; (R) Relegated

=== Matches ===
Win Draw Loss Upcoming fixture

5 May 2014 1	FH	1–1	Breiðablik	Hafnarfjörður
19:15 GMT	Hólmar Örn Rúnarsson 35'	Report	Tómas Óli Garðarsson 3'	Stadium: Kaplakrikavöllur; Attendance: 1869; Referee: Kristinn Jakobsson

8 May 2014 2	Breiðablik	1–2	KR	Garðabær
19:15 GMT	Elfar Árni Aðalsteinsson 38'	Report	Haukur Heiðar Hauksson 2'; Óskar Örn Hauksson 57'	Stadium: Samsung-völlurinn; Attendance: 1502; Referee: Þóroddur Hjaltalín

12 May 2014 3	Keflavík	2–0	Breiðablik	Keflavík
19:15 GMT	Elías Már Ómarsson 62' 82'	Report		Stadium: Nettóvöllurinn; Attendance: 1250; Referee: Þorvaldur Árnason

18 May 2014 4	Breiðablik	2–2	Fjölnir	Kópavogur
19:15 GMT	Árni Vilhjálmsson 28'; Davíð Kristján Ólafsson 61'	Report	Guðmundur Karl Guðmundsson 54'; Þórir Guðjónsson 73'	Stadium: Kópavogsvöllur; Attendance: 1523; Referee: Vilhjálmur Alvar Þórarinsson

22 May 2014 5	Fram	1–1	Breiðablik	Reykjavík
19:15 GMT	Hafsteinn Briem 76'	Report	Guðjón Pétur Lýðsson 3' (pen.)	Stadium: Gervigrasvöllur Laugardal; Attendance: 685; Referee: Garðar Örn Hinriksson

2 June 2014 6	Breiðablik	1–1	Stjarnan	Kópavogur
20:00 GMT	Elvar Páll Sigurðsson 74'	Report	Niclas Vemmelund 19'	Stadium: Kópavogsvöllur; Attendance: 1250; Referee: Kristinn Jakobsson

11 June 2014 7	Fylkir	1–1	Breiðablik	Reykjavík
19:15 GMT	Elís Rafn Björnsson 14'	Report	Guðjón Pétur Lýðsson 33'	Stadium: Lautin; Attendance: 1303; Referee: Valdimar Pálsson

15 June 2014 8	Breiðablik	1–1	ÍBV	Kópavogur
17:00 GMT	Árni Vilhjálmsson 8'	Report	Jonathan Ricardo Glenn 81'	Stadium: Kópavogsvöllur; Attendance: 680; Referee: Gunnar Jarl Jónsson

22 June 2014 9	Víkingur	1–0	Breiðablik	Reykjavík
19:15 GMT	Pape Mamadou Faye 16'	Report		Stadium: Víkingsvöllur; Attendance: 1162; Referee: Garðar Örn Hinriksson

2 July 2014 10	Breiðablik	3–2	Þór	Kópavogur
19:15 GMT	Elfar Árni Aðalsteinsson 23'; Elfar Freyr Helgason 45'; Árni Vilhjálmsson 53'	Report	Sveinn Elías Jónsson 37'; Þórður Birgisson 90'	Stadium: Kópavogsvöllur; Attendance: 404; Referee: Vilhjálmur Alvar Þórarinsson

14 July 2014 11	Valur	1–2	Breiðablik	Reykjavík
19:15 GMT	Kolbeinn Kárason 30'	Report	Elfar Árni Aðalsteinsson 17' 21'	Stadium: Vodafonevöllurinn; Attendance: 1056; Referee: Þóroddur Hjaltalín

21 July 2014 12	Breiðablik	2–4	FH	Kópavogur
19:15 GMT	Árni Vilhjálmsson 11'; Arnór Sveinn Aðalsteinsson 44'	Report	Ingimundur Níels Óskarsson 10'; Atli Viðar Björnsson 31'; Kassim Doumbia 39'; Jón Ragnar Jónsson 90'	Stadium: Kópavogsvöllur; Attendance: 1240; Referee: Þorvaldur Árnason

27 July 2014 13	KR	1–1	Breiðablik	Reykjavík
20:00 GMT	Kjartan Henry Finnbogason 53'	Report	Árni Vilhjálmsson 9'	Stadium: KR-völlur; Attendance: 1200; Referee: Garðar Örn Hinriksson

6 August 2014 14	Breiðablik	4–4	Keflavík	Kópavogur
19:15 GMT	Guðjón Pétur Lýðsson 36'; Höskuldur Gunnlaugsson 47'; Stefán Gíslason 88'; Baldvin Sturluson 90+5'	Report	Aron Rúnarsson Heiðdal 5'; Elías Már Ómarsson 45'; Hörður Sveinsson 50'; Frans Elvarsson 69'	Stadium: Kópavogsvöllur; Attendance: 827; Referee: Guðmundur Ársæll Guðmundsson

11 August 2014 15	Fjölnir	1–1	Breiðablik	Reykjavík
19:15 GMT	Mark Charles Magee 76'	Report	Árni Vilhjálmsson 52'	Stadium: Fjölnisvöllur; Attendance: 784; Referee: Þóroddur Hjaltalín

18 August 2014 16	Breiðablik	3–0	Fram	Kópavogur
19:15 GMT	Árni Vilhjálmsson 78'; Guðjón Pétur Lýðsson 80'; Elfar Árni Aðalsteinsson 84'	Report		Stadium: Kópavogsvöllur; Attendance: 1575; Referee: Ívar Orri Kristjánsson

24 August 2014 17	Stjarnan	2–2	Breiðablik	Garðabær
19:15 GMT	Ólafur Karl Finsen 44' (pen.); Veigar Páll Gunnarsson 83'	Report	Guðjón Pétur Lýðsson 49'; Damir Muminovic 52'	Stadium: Samsung-völlurinn; Attendance: 855; Referee: Garðar Örn Hinriksson

31 August 2014 18	Breiðablik	2–2	Fylkir	Kópavogur
18:00 GMT	Elvar Páll Sigurðsson 53'; Ellert Hreinsson 79'	Report	Gunnar Örn Jónsson 40'; Kjartan Ágúst Breiðdal 81'	Stadium: Kópavogsvöllur; Attendance: 1115; Referee: Þóroddur Hjaltalín

14 September 2014 19	ÍBV	1–1	Breiðablik	Vestmannaeyjar
17:00 GMT	Brynjar Gauti Guðjónsson 25'	Report	Damir Muminovic 71'	Stadium: Hásteinsvöllur; Attendance: 360; Referee: Valdimar Pálsson

21 September 2014 20	Breiðablik	4–1	Víkingur	Kópavogur
16:00 GMT	Árni Vilhjálmsson 9' 19' 82'; Ellert Hreinsson 90'	Report	Ívar Örn Jónsson 78' (pen.)	Stadium: Kópavogsvöllur; Attendance: 807; Referee: Þorvaldur Árnason

28 September 2014 21	Þór	2–0	Breiðablik	Akureyri
14:00 GMT	Jóhann Helgi Hannesson 4'; Kristinn Þór Rósbergsson 82'	Report		Stadium: Þórsvöllur; Attendance: 287; Referee: Kristinn Jakobsson

4 October 2014 22	Breiðablik	3–0	Valur	Kópavogur
13:30 GMT	Guðjón Pétur Lýðsson 67' (pen.) 90'; Ellert Hreinsson 90'	Report		Stadium: Kópavogsvöllur; Attendance: 495; Referee: Vilhjálmur Alvar Þórarinsson

=== Results ===
Overall								Home						Away					
Pld	W	D	L	GF	GA	GD	Pts	W	D	L	GF	GA	GD	W	D	L	GF	GA	GD
22	5	12	5	36	33	+3	27	4	5	2	26	19	+7	1	7	3	10	14	−4

Last updated: 21 October 2014.
Source: KSÍ

=== Points breakdown ===
- Points at home: 17
- Points away from home: 10
- 6 Points: Valur
- 4 Points: Fram
- 3 Points: Víkingur, Þór
- 2 Points: Fjölnir, Stjarnan, Fylkir, ÍBV
- 1 Points: FH, KR, Keflavík

== Borgunarbikar ==
Breiðablik entered the Borgunarbikarinn in the 3rd round (32nd finals) with the other teams from Úrvalsdeild where they were drawn against local rivals HK. Breiðablik won the game 2–1 and the win was their first win of the 2014 summer season. In the 4th round (16th finals) Breiðablik defeated Þór 3–1 after extra time. Breiðablik then lost in the 5th round 2–0 to eventual winners KR in a disappointing game.

=== Matches ===
Date	Round	Opponents	Stadium	Result F–A	Scorers
26 May 2014	Round 3	HK	Kórinn	2–1	Árni Vill 65' Jordan Halsman 80'
19 June 2014	Round 4	Þór	Kópavogsvöllur	3–1 (ext)	Guðjón Pétur 63' Elfar Árni 99' Andri Rafn 115'
6 July 2014	Round 5	KR	Kópavogsvöllur	0–2	

== Squad information ==
=== Players' statistics ===
As of 21. October 2014

Appearances (Apps.) numbers are for appearances in competitive games only(Úrvalsdeild, Borgunarbikar and Lengjubikar). Right side of + are sub appearances
Red card numbers denote: Numbers in parentheses represent red cards overturned for wrongful dismissal.

No.	Nat.	Player	Pos.	Úrvalsdeild				Borgunarbikar				Lengjubikar				Total			
No.	Nat.	Player	Pos.	Apps	Goal	Booked	Sent off (straight red)	Apps	Goal	Booked	Sent off (straight red)	Apps	Goal	Booked	Sent off (straight red)	Apps	Goal	Booked	Sent off (straight red)
1	(Iceland)	Gunnleifur Gunnleifsson	GK	22				3				9				34			
2	(Iceland)	Gísli Páll Helgason	DF	9		2		2				3+2				16		2	
3	(Iceland)	Oliver Sigurjónsson	DF	1+4												5			
4	(Iceland) (Slovenia)	Damir Muminovic	DF	15	2	6		2		1		8		2	1	25	2	8	1
5	(Iceland)	Elfar Freyr Helgason	DF	21+1	1	3		3	1			8+2		1		35	2	4	
6	(Scotland)	Jordan Halsman	DF	4+3				1	1	1		9		3	1	17	1	3	1
7	(Iceland)	Stefán Gíslason	MF	10+3	1	2		1+1				4	1	1		19	2	3	
8	(Iceland)	Finnur Orri Margeirsson	MF	21		2		3				8	3	1		32	3	3	
9	(Iceland)	Elfar Árni Aðalsteinsson	FW	12+7	5	3		3		1		9+1	1	2		32	6	5	
10	(Iceland)	Guðjón Pétur Lýðsson	MF	18+1	7	2		3	1			8+1	3	1		31	11	3	
11	(Iceland)	Olgeir Sigurgeirsson	MF	2+9		2		2+1				2+6				22		2	
12	(Iceland)	Arnór Bjarki Hafsteinsson	GK									1				1			
14	(Iceland)	Höskuldur Gunnlaugsson	MF	14+1	1			1+1				2+3				22	1		
16	(Iceland)	Ernir Bjarnason	MF	+1								1+2				4			
17	(Iceland)	Elvar Páll Sigurðsson	FW	10+5	2			2				+6	1	1		23	3	1	
19	(Iceland)	Gunnlaugur Hlynur Birgisson	FW	+1												1			
20	(Iceland)	Stefán Þór Pálsson	FW									1+1				2			
21	(Iceland)	Guðmundur Friðriksson	DF	3				+1				4+3				11			
21	(Iceland)	Baldvin Sturluson	DF	5+3	1	1										8	1	1	
22	(Iceland)	Ellert Hreinsson	FW	7+8	3	2		+1				1+5				22	3	2	
23	(Iceland)	Árni Vilhjálmsson	FW	19+1	10	4	1	3	2			7	5	1		30	17	6	1
26	(Iceland)	Páll Olgeir Þorsteinsson	DF	4+2								8	1			14	1		
27	(Iceland)	Tómas Óli Garðarsson	MF	7+2	1	1		+2				4+4	3			19	4	1	
28	(Iceland)	Davíð Kristján Ólafsson	MF	4+5	1			+1				4+6		1		20	1	1	
29	(Iceland)	Arnór Sveinn Aðalsteinsson	DF	16+1	1	4		1+1								19	1	4	
30	(Iceland)	Andri Rafn Yeoman	MF	18+2		1		2		1		7		3		29		4	
33	(Iceland)	Gísli Eyjólfsson	FW									2+2	1			4	1		
	(Iceland)	Ingiberg Ólafur Jónsson	DF									+1				1			
