= 2015 Úrvalsdeild =

Úrvalsdeild (Pepsi-deildin)
- Season: 2015
- Dates: 3 May – 4 October 2015
- Champions: FH (7th title)
- Relegated: Keflavík; Leiknir R
- Matches: 132
- Goals: 380 (2.88 per match)
- Top goalscorer: Patrick Pedersen (13 goals)
- Best goalkeeper: Gunnleifur Gunnleifsson (12 clean sheets)
- Biggest home win: Víkingur 7–1 Keflavík (19 July 2015)
- Biggest away win: Fylkir 0–4 Fjölnir (26 July 2015); Keflavík 0–4 ÍA (20 September 2015)
- Highest scoring: Víkingur 7–1 Keflavík (19 July 2015); ÍA 4–4 Fjölnir (24 August 2015)
- Longest winning run: 7 games FH
- Longest unbeaten run: 9 games Breiðablik
- Longest winless run: 13 games Keflavík
- Longest losing run: 4 games Keflavík; Fjölnir; Víkingur R
- Highest attendance: 2843; FH 1–1 Breiðablik (21 June 2015)
- Lowest attendance: 350; Keflavík 0–4 ÍA (20 September 2015)

The 2015 Úrvalsdeild karla, also known as Pepsi-deild karla for sponsorship reasons, was the 104th season of top-flight Icelandic football. Twelve teams contested the league; the defending champions were Stjarnan, who had won their first league title in 2014 going unbeaten in the league.

On 26 September FH were crowned champions after a 2–1 win over Fjölnir with one game to spare. This was FH's 7th league title.

Keflavík and Leiknir R were relegated from the league. Keflavík had been in the league since 2004 but this was Leiknir R's first season in the top flight.

The season started on 3 May 2015 and was conclude on 4 October 2015.

== Teams ==
Location of teams in the 2015 Úrvalsdeild

A total of 12 teams contested the league. 10 teams from the 2014 season and the 2 promoted teams from 2014 1. deild karla. On 4 September 2014 both Leiknir R. and ÍA earned promotion from 1. deild, they replaced the relegated teams Fram and Þór.

=== Club information ===
Team	Location	Stadium	Manager	Captain	2014 season
Breiðablik	Kópavogur	Kópavogsvöllur	(Iceland) Arnar Grétarsson	(Iceland) Arnór Sveinn Aðalsteinsson	7th
FH	Hafnarfjörður	Kaplakriki	(Iceland) Heimir Guðjónsson	(Iceland) Davíð Þór Viðarsson	2nd
Fjölnir	Reykjavík	Fjölnisvöllur	(Iceland) Ágúst Gylfason	(Iceland) Bergsveinn Ólafsson	9th
Fylkir	Reykjavík	Lautin	(Iceland) Hermann Hreiðarsson	(Iceland) Ásgeir Börkur Ásgeirsson	6th
ÍA	Akranes	Norðurálsvöllur	(Iceland) Gunnlaugur Jónsson	(Iceland) Ármann Smári Björnsson	2nd, 1. deild
ÍBV	Vestmannaeyjar	Hásteinsvöllur	(Iceland) Ásmundur Arnarson (interim)	(Iceland) Andri Ólafsson	10th
Keflavík	Keflavík	Nettó-völlurinn	(Iceland) Haukur Ingi Guðnason (Iceland) Jóhann Birnir Guðmundsson	(Iceland) Haraldur Freyr Guðmundsson	8th
KR	Reykjavík	Alvogenvöllurinn	(Iceland) Bjarni Guðjónsson	(Iceland) Pálmi Rafn Pálmason	3rd
Leiknir R.	Reykjavík	Leiknisvöllur	(Iceland) Freyr Alexandersson (Iceland) Davíð Jónasson	(Iceland) Ólafur Hrannar Kristjánsson	1st, 1.deild
Stjarnan	Garðabær	Samsung-völlurinn	(Iceland) Rúnar Páll Sigmundsson	(Denmark) Michael Præst	1st
Valur	Reykjavík	Vodafone-völlurinn	(Iceland) Ólafur Jóhannesson	(Iceland) Haukur Páll Sigurðsson	5h
Víkingur	Reykjavík	Víkin	(Serbia) Miloš Milojević	(Serbia) Igor Taskovic	4th

=== Kit manufacturer and sponsors ===
Team	Kit manufacturer	Sponsors
Breiðablik	Jako	Vörður
FH	Adidas	Actavis
Fjölnir	Hummel	Bónus
Fylkir	Jako	Bónus
ÍA	Errea	Norðurál
ÍBV	Hummel	Bónus
Keflavík	Nike	Landsbankinn
KR	Nike	Alvogen
Leiknir R.	Errea	Golden Seafood Company
Stjarnan	Uhlsport	Orkan
Valur	Hummel	Íslandsbanki
Víkingur	Nike	TVG-Zimsen

=== Managerial Changes ===
Team	Outgoing Manager	Manner of Departure	Date of Departure	Position in Table	Incoming Manager	Date of Appointment
ÍBV	(Iceland) Sigurður Ragnar Eyjólfsson	Mutual Consent	4 October 2014	Pre-Season	(Iceland) Jóhannes Harðarson	20 October 2014
Valur	(Iceland) Magnús Gylfason	Mutual Consent	6 October 2014	Pre-Season	(Iceland) Ólafur Jóhannesson	9 October 2014
Breiðablik	(Iceland) Guðmundur Benediktsson	End of Contract	13 October 2014	Pre-Season	(Iceland) Arnar Grétarsson	14 October 2014
KR	(Iceland) Rúnar Kristinsson	Mutual Consent	24 October 2014	Pre-Season	(Iceland) Bjarni Guðjónsson	28 October 2014
Keflavík	(Iceland) Kristján Guðmundsson	Sacked	4 June 2015	12th	(Iceland) Haukur Ingi Guðnason (Iceland) Jóhann Birnir Guðmundsson	5 June 2015
Fylkir	(Iceland) Ásmundur Arnarsson	Mutual Consent	6 July 2015	7th	(Iceland) Hermann Hreiðarsson	6 July 2015
Víkingur	(Iceland) Ólafur Þórðarson	Mutual Consent	15 July 2015	10th	None	
ÍBV	(Iceland) Jóhannes Harðarson	Leave of Absence	24 June 2015	11th	(Iceland) Ásmundur Arnarson	22 July 2015

- ^{1}Ólafur Þórðarson and Miloš Milojević will co-head coach Víkingur next season. Miloš Milojević took over as sole head coach after Ólafur Þórðarson's departure on 15 July.
- ^{2}Ásmundur Arnarson took over as an interim manager of ÍBV until the end of the season after Jóhannes Harðarson got a leave of absence because of personal issues.

== League table ==
Pos	Team	Pld	W	D	L	GF	GA	GD	Pts	Qualification or relegation
1	FH (C)	22	15	3	4	47	26	+21	48	Qualification for the Champions League second qualifying round
2	Breiðablik	22	13	7	2	34	13	+21	46	Qualification for the Europa League first qualifying round
3	KR	22	12	6	4	36	21	+15	42	Qualification for the Europa League first qualifying round
4	Stjarnan	22	9	6	7	32	24	+8	33	
5	Valur	22	9	6	7	38	31	+7	33	Qualification for the Europa League first qualifying round (Note: Valur qualified for the UEFA Europa League first qualifying round by winning the 2015 Icelandic Cup.)
6	Fjölnir	22	9	6	7	36	35	+1	33	
7	ÍA	22	7	8	7	31	31	0	29	
8	Fylkir	22	7	8	7	26	31	−5	29	
9	Víkingur Reykjavík	22	5	8	9	32	36	−4	23	
10	ÍBV	22	5	4	13	26	37	−11	19	
11	Leiknir Reykjavík (R)	22	3	6	13	20	34	−14	15	Relegation to 1. deild karla
12	Keflavík (R)	22	2	4	16	22	61	−39	10	Relegation to 1. deild karla

Source: KSÍ, Soccerway
Rules for classification: 1) Points; 2) Goal difference; 3) Goals scored; 4) Head-to-head points; 5) Head-to-head goal difference; 6) Head-to-head goals scored; 7) Head-to-head away goals scored; 8) Play-off (only for deciding champion); 9) Draw.
(C) Champions; (R) Relegated

=== Positions by round ===
Team ╲ Round	1	2	3	4	5	6	7	8	9	10	11	12	13	14	15	16	17	18	19	20	21	22
FH	2	1	2	1	1	1	1	1	1	1	1	2	1	1	1	1	1	1	1	1	1	1
Breiðablik	6	7	10	6	4	3	2	2	2	3	3	4	4	3	3	3	2	2	2	2	2	2
KR	11	9	6	3	2	2	4	5	3	2	2	1	2	2	2	2	3	3	3	3	3	3
Stjarnan	5	2	1	2	3	5	7	6	6	6	6	7	6	7	6	6	8	8	6	6	6	4
Valur	12	10	8	9	9	7	5	4	5	4	4	3	3	4	4	4	4	4	4	4	4	5
Fjölnir	4	4	9	4	7	4	3	3	4	5	5	6	5	5	5	5	5	5	5	5	5	6
ÍA	8	6	7	10	10	11	10	10	10	10	8	8	8	8	9	9	9	9	9	8	7	7
Fylkir	7	8	3	8	6	8	6	7	7	7	7	5	7	6	7	7	7	6	8	7	8	8
Víkingur Reykjavík	3	3	4	5	8	9	9	9	8	8	10	9	9	9	8	8	6	7	7	9	9	9
ÍBV	9	11	12	12	12	10	11	12	11	11	11	10	10	11	10	10	10	10	10	10	10	10
Leiknir R.	1	5	5	7	5	6	8	8	9	9	9	11	11	10	11	11	11	11	11	11	11	11
Keflavík	10	12	11	11	11	12	12	11	12	12	12	12	12	12	12	12	12	12	12	12	12	12

Leader
2016–17 UEFA Europa League first qualifying round
Relegation to 1. deild karla

Source: KSÍ

== Results ==
Home \ Away	BRE	FH	FJÖ	FYL	ÍA	ÍBV	KEF	KR	LEI	STJ	VAL	VÍK
Breiðablik		2–1	2–0	0–1	3–1	1–0	4–0	2–2	0–0	3–0	1–0	4–1
FH	1–1		2–1	2–2	4–1	3–1	2–0	1–3	4–2	4–0	2–1	1–0
Fjölnir	0–2	1–3		1–1	2–0	1–0	1–0	2–1	3–0	1–1	1–1	4–3
Fylkir	1–1	3–2	0–4		0–0	3–0	3–3	1–3	3–1	0–2	0–3	1–0
ÍA	0–1	2–3	4–4	0–0		3–1	4–2	0–0	2–1	0–1	1–0	1–1
ÍBV	2–0	1–4	4–0	0–1	1–2		3–0	1–1	2–2	0–2	3–3	3–2
Keflavík	1–1	1–2	1–1	1–3	0–4	3–1		0–1	3–2	1–2	1–2	1–3
KR	0–0	1–3	2–0	2–0	1–1	1–0	4–0		1–0	0–3	2–2	5–2
Leiknir	0–2	0–1	2–3	1–1	0–1	0–2	1–1	0–2		1–0	0–1	2–0
Stjarnan	0–1	1–1	1–3	1–0	1–1	3–0	7–0	0–1	1–1		1–2	1–1
Valur	0–1	2–0	3–3	4–2	4–2	1–1	3–2	3–0	0–3	1–2		0–1
Víkingur Reykjavík	2–2	0–1	2–0	0–0	1–1	1–0	7–1	0–3	1–1	2–2	2–2	

Source: KSÍ
Legend: Blue = home team win; Yellow = draw; Red = away team win.

== Season statistics ==
=== Top scorers ===
As of matches played on 3 October 2015.

Rank	Player	Club	Goals
1	(Denmark) Patrick Pedersen	Valur	13
2	(Trinidad and Tobago) Jonathan Ricardo Glenn	Breiðablik	12
3	(Iceland) Garðar Gunnlaugsson	ÍA	9
4	(Scotland) Steven Lennon	FH	9
5	(Iceland) Atli Viðar Björnsson	FH	8
6	(Iceland) Óskar Örn Hauksson	KR	8
7	(Denmark) Jeppe Hansen	Stjarnan	8
8	(Iceland) Atli Guðnason	FH	8

- First goal: 1. round – 23rd minute
  - Ólafur Karl Finsen for Stjarnan against ÍA on 3 May 2015
- Last goal: 22. round – 90+5 minute
  - Andri Rafn Yeoman for Breiðablik against Fjölnir on 3 October 2015
- Fastest goal: 17 seconds
  - Rolf Toft for Víkingur R against Stjarnan on 20 May 2015
- Most goals in a single match: 3
  - Steven Lennon for FH against Leiknir R on 31 May 2015
  - Kristján Flóki Finnbogason for FH against ÍBV on 14 June 2015
  - Jonathan Glenn for Breiðablik against ÍA on 17 August 2015
  - Guðjón Baldvinsson for Stjarnan against Keflavík on 26 September 2015

=== Clean sheets ===
As of matches played on 3 October 2015.

Rank	Player	Club	Clean sheets
1	(Iceland) Gunnleifur Gunnleifsson	Breiðablik	12
2	(Iceland) Stefán Logi Magnússon	KR	9
3	(Iceland) Árni Snær Ólafsson	ÍA	6
4	(Faroe Islands) Gunnar Nielsen	Stjarnan	6
5	(Iceland) Þórður Ingason	Fjölnir	5
6	(Iceland) Róbert Örn Óskarsson	FH	5
7	(Iceland) Ólafur Íshólm Ólafsson	Fylkir	5

- Most clean sheets by club: 12
  - Breiðablik
- Fewest clean sheets by club: 0
  - Keflavík

=== Discipline ===
==== Yellow cards ====
As of matches played on 3 October 2015.

Rank	Player	Club	Booked
1	(Iceland) Einar Orri Einarsson	Keflavík	10
2	(England) Jonathan Patrick Barden	ÍBV	8
3	(Netherlands) Mees Junior Siers	ÍBV	8
4	(Iceland) Brynjar Hlöðversson	Leiknir R	7
5	(Iceland) Ólafur Hrannar Kristjánsson	Leiknir R	7
6	(Iceland) Frans Elvarsson	Keflavík	7
7	(Iceland) Andri Fannar Stefánsson	Valur	7
8	(Iceland) Bergsveinn Ólafsson	Fjölnir	7
9	(Iceland) Pétur Viðarsson	FH	7
10	(Iceland) Ásgeir Börkur Ásgeirsson	Fylkir	7
11	(Iceland) Jóhannes Karl Guðjónsson	Fylkir	7
12	(Iceland) Ragnar Bragi Sveinsson	Fylkir	7
13	(Serbia) Igor Tasković	Víkingur R	7
14	(Iceland) Hafsteinn Briem	ÍBV	7

- Most yellow cards by club: 55
  - Keflavík

==== Red cards ====
As of matches played on 3 October 2015.

Rank	Player	Club	Sent off (straight red)
1	(Iceland) Bjarni Þór Viðarsson	FH	1
2	(Serbia) Marko Andelkovic	ÍA	1
3	(Iceland) Albert Hafsteinsson	ÍA	1
4	(Iceland) Arnar Már Guðjónsson	ÍA	1
5	(Denmark) Michael Præst	Stjarnan	1
6	(Iceland) Eiríkur Ingi Magnússon	Leiknir R	1
7	(Iceland) Eyjólfur Tómasson	Leiknir R	1
8	(Spain) Kiko Insa	Keflavík	1
9	(Trinidad and Tobago) Jonathan Glenn	Breiðablik	1
10	(Iceland) Aron Bjarki Jósepsson	KR	1
11	(Iceland) Stefán Logi Magnússon	KR	1
12	(Iceland) Brynjar Gauti Guðjónsson	Stjarnan	1
13	(Faroe Islands) Gunnar Nielsen	Stjarnan	1
14	(El Salvador) Pablo Punyed	Stjarnan	1
15	(Iceland) Gunnar Már Guðmundsson	Fjölnir	1
16	(Iceland) Arnór Eyvar Ólafsson	Fjölnir	1

- Most red cards by club: 4
  - Stjarnan

== Awards ==
=== Player of the Year ===
The player of the season was awarded to Emil Pálsson who played for both Fjölnir and FH during the season.

=== Young Player of the Year ===
The young player of the year was awarded to Breiðablik's winger Höskuldur Gunnlaugsson.

=== Golden Boot ===
Patrick Pedersen was awarded the golden boot after scoring 13 goals in 20 games (4 penalties)
Jonathan Glenn was awarded the silver boot after scoring 12 goals in 20 games (2 penalties)
Garðar Gunnlaugsson was awarded the bronze boot after scoring 9 goals in 17 games (0 penalties)

=== Referee of the year ===
Gunnar Jarl Jónsson was voted the referee of the year by Úrvalsdeild players.

=== Player of the Round ===
Round	Fréttablaðið	Morgunblaðið	Fótbolti.net	Round	Fréttablaðið	Morgunblaðið	Fótbolti.net
1	Hilmar Árni Halldórsson (Leiknir R)	Hilmar Árni Halldórsson (Leiknir R)	Hilmar Árni Halldórsson (Leiknir R)	12		Ásgeir Eyþórsson (Fylkir)	Vladimir Tufegdzic (Víkingur R)
2		Ármann Smári Björnsson (ÍA)	Þorri Geir Rúnarsson (Stjarnan)	13		Þórir Guðjónsson (Fjölnir)	Emil Pálsson (FH)
3	Sigurður Egill Lárusson (Valur)	Kristinn Freyr Sigurðsson (Valur)	Sigurður Egill Lárusson (Valur)	14		Halldór Kristinn Halldórsson (Leiknir R)	Kristinn Jónsson (Breiðablik)
4		Skúli Jón Friðgeirsson (KR)	Skúli Jón Friðgeirsson (KR)	15		Atli Viðar Björnsson (FH)	Jose Sito (ÍBV)
5	Albert Brynjar Ingason (Fylkir)	Gunnar Nielsen (Stjarnan)	Albert Brynjar Ingason (Fylkir)	16			Jonathan Glenn (Breiðablik)
6		Kristinn Jónsson (Breiðablik)	Steven Lennon (FH)	17		Jón Vilhelm Ákason (ÍA)	Patrick Pedersen (Valur)
7	Patrick Pedersen (Valur)	Ólafur Páll Snorrason (Fjölnir)	Höskuldur Gunnlaugsson (Breiðablik)	18		Bjarni Þór Viðarsson (FH)	Kassim Doumbia (FH)
8	Kristinn Jónsson (Breiðablik)	Kristján Flóki Finnbogason (FH)	Kristinn Jónsson (Breiðablik)	19	Árni Snær Ólafsson (ÍA)		Steven Lennon (FH)
9	Ásgeir Marteinsson (ÍA)	Ásgeir Marteinsson (ÍA)	Ásgeir Marteinsson (ÍA)	20	Ragnar Bragi Sveinsson (Fylkir)	Oliver Sigurjónsson (Breiðablik)	Ragnar Bragi Sveinsson (Fylkir)
10	Avni Pepa (ÍBV)	Patrick Pedersen (Valur)	Rasmus Christiansen (KR)	21	Guðjón Baldvinsson (Stjarnan)		Guðjón Baldvinsson (Stjarnan)
11		Bjarni Ólafur Eiríksson (Valur)	Bjarni Ólafur Eiríksson (Valur)	22	Garðar Gunnlaugsson (ÍA)		Gary Martin (KR)
