= 2009 Icelandic Cup =

Visa-Bikar

Tournament details
- Country: Iceland

Final positions
- Champions: Breiðablik
- Runners-up: Fram

The 2009 Visa-Bikar is the 50th season of the Icelandic national football cup. It began on 22 May 2009 and ended with the final on 3 October 2009 at Laugardalsvöllur. The winners qualified for the second qualifying round of the 2010–11 UEFA Europa League.

== First round ==
The First Round consists of 32 teams from lower Icelandic divisions. The matches were played between 23 and 25 May 2009.

Team 1	Score	Team 2
23 May 2009
UMF Kjalnesinga	5–2	Elliði
24 May 2009
Carl	3–0	UMF Gnúpverja
UMF Laugdæla	2–3	Afríka
KÍBV	1–2	Skallagrímur
Léttir	0–3	Hvíti riddarinn
Völsungur	1–2	Dalvík/Reynir
Berserkir	10–0	Höfrungur
KV	5–2	Ægir
KFG	0–2	Árborgar
UMF Hvöt	6–0	Kormáks
UMF Álftanes	11	UMF Snæfell
Augnablik	2–3	Ýmir
KB	3–0	Þróttur Vogum
Einherji	10–0	Boltafélag Norðfjarðar
Magni	2–1	UMF Tindastóll
25 May 2009
KFR	1–2	KFS

== Second round ==
The Second Round includes the 16 winners from the previous round as well as 24 teams from the second and third division. The matches were played on 1 and 2 June 2009.

Team 1	Score	Team 2
1 June 2009
Einherji	3–0	Huginn
Víðir	2–1	KFS
Ýmir	5–6 (a.e.t.)	Víkingur Ólafsvík
Skallagrímur	1–4 (a.e.t.)	Haukar
KB	1–2	KV
KA	4–1 (a.e.t.)	Dalvík/Reynir
2 June 2009
Njarðvík	3–0	Hvíti riddarinn
HK	9–1	Afríka
Carl	2–1 (a.e.t.)	UMF Kjalnesinga
Grótta	5–0	UMF Hamar
Leiknir Reykjavík	3–3 (a.e.t.); 1−4 (pen)	Selfoss
Höttur	8–1	UMF Sindri
Fjarðabyggðar	9–0	Leiknir Fáskrúðsfirði
Þór Akureyri	2–1	Magni
KS/Leiftur	3–3 (a.e.t.); 4−5 (pen)	UMF Hvöt
Hamrarnir/Vinir	1–3	UMF Afturelding
GG	0–4	Reynir Sandgerði
ÍA	5–0	Berserkir
Árborgar	0–2	Víkingur Reykjavik
UMF Álftanes	3–2 (a.e.t.)	ÍR

== Third round ==
The Third Round include the 20 winners from the previous round and the 12 teams from the Úrvalsdeild. These matches were played on 17 and 18 June 2009.

Team 1	Score	Team 2
17 June 2009
Haukar	0–1 (a.e.t.)	Fjarðabyggðar
Þór Akureyri	3–1	Víkingur Ólafsvík
Selfoss	2–2 (a.e.t.); 1−3 (pen)	Höttur
Reynir Sandgerði	2–1	KV
Fram	2–1	Njarðvík
18 June 2009
KA	3–1	UMF Afturelding
IBV	3–2	Víkingur Reykjavik
Víðir	0–0 (a.e.t.); 3−2 (pen)	Þróttur
Grótta	0–2	KR
UMF Hvöt	0–2	Breiðablik
Fjölnir	0–2	HK
Fylkir	7–3	Stjarnan
Carl	0–3	FH
Valur	3–0	UMF Álftanes
Grindavík	3–1	ÍA
Keflavík	2–0	Einherji

== Fourth round ==
This round consists of the 16 winners of the previous round. These matches were played on 5 and 6 July 2009.

Team 1	Score	Team 2
5 July 2009
IBV	2–3 (a.e.t.)	FH
Fylkir	6–1	Fjarðabyggðar
Breiðablik	3–1 (a.e.t.)	Höttur
Keflavík	2–1	Þór Akureyri
Fram	1–0 (a.e.t.)	Grindavík
6 July 2009
Valur	3–2 (a.e.t.)	KA
HK	5–2 (a.e.t.)	Reynir Sandgerði
Víðir	0–2	KR

== Quarter-finals ==
This round consists of the 8 winners of the previous round.

30 July 2009
19:15 GMT

Keflavík	3–1	FH
T. Nielsen 20' (o.g.); S. Samuelsen 48', 58'		A. Guðnason 71'

Sparisjóðsvöllurinn, Keflavík
Attendance: 1,135
Referee: Garðar Örn Hinriksson

30 July 2009
19:15 GMT

HK	0–1	Breiðablik
		G. Pétursson 35'

Kópavogsvöllur, Kópavogur
Attendance: 1,358
Referee: Kristinn Jakobsson

30 July 2009
19:15 GMT

Fram	2–0	Fylkir
S. Tillen 85' (pen.); J. Fjóluson 90'

Laugardalsvöllur, Reykjavík
Attendance: 548
Referee: Jóhannes Valgeirsson

2 August 2009
18:00 GMT

Valur	1–3	KR
B. Eiríksson 43'		B. Takefusa 60', 87'; G. Benediktsson 77' (pen.)

Vodafonehöllin, Reykjavík
Attendance: 1,023
Referee: Eyjólfur M. Kristinsson

== Semi-finals ==
The semifinal matches took place at Laugardalsvöllur on 12 and 13 September 2009 and involved the four winners from the previous round.

12 September 2009
16:15 GMT

Fram	1–0	KR
J. Tillen 78'

Laugardalsvöllur, Reykjavík
Attendance: 1,946
Referee: Þorvaldur Árnason

13 September 2009
16:15 GMT

Keflavík	2–3	Breiðablik
G. Antoníusson 22'; S. Samuelsen 26'		E. Helgason 8'; K. Jónsson 13'; G. Pétursson 66' (pen.)

Laugardalsvöllur, Reykjavík
Attendance: 2,052
Referee: Þóroddur Hjaltalín

== Final ==
The Final took place at Laugardalsvöllur on 3 October 2009 and was contested between the winners of the Semifinal matches.

3 October 2009
14:00 GMT

Fram	2–2 (a.e.t.)	Breiðablik
I. Ólason 73'; S. Tillen 97' (pen.)		A. Finnbogason 60', 102' (pen.)
Penalties
S. Tillen (penalty scored); H. Þórarinsson (penalty missed); G. Magnússon (penalty scored); I. Ólason (penalty scored); J. Tillen (penalty scored); I. McShane (penalty missed)	4–5	(penalty scored) A. Finnbogason; (penalty scored) G. Pétursson; (penalty missed) A. Aðalsteinsson; (penalty scored) O. Sigurgeirsson; (penalty scored) K. Ársælsson; (penalty scored) E. Helgason

Laugardalsvöllur, Reykjavík
Attendance: 4,766
Referee: Jóhannes Valgeirsson
