= 2021 Úrvalsdeild =

Úrvalsdeild karla (Pepsi Max deild karla)
- Season: 2021
- Dates: 30 April – 25 September 2021
- Champions: Víkingur Reykjavík
- Relegated: HK; Fylkir
- Champions League: Víkingur Reykjavík
- Europa Conference League: Breiðablik; KR
- Matches: 132
- Goals: 373 (2.83 per match)
- Top goalscorer: Nikolaj Hansen (16 goals)
- Biggest home win: FH 5–0 Leiknir (15 August 2021); ÍA 5–0 Fylkir (19 September 2021)
- Biggest away win: Fylkir 0–7 Breiðablik (29 August 2021)
- Highest scoring: Fylkir 0–7 Breiðablik (29 August 2021)
- Longest winning run: 7 matches Breiðablik (2 August – 11 September)
- Longest unbeaten run: 9 matches Víkingur Reykjavík (2 May – 21 June)
- Longest winless run: 10 matches Fylkir (18 July – 25 September)
- Longest losing run: 6 matches Fylkir (16 August – 25 September)
- All statistics correct as of 25 September 2021.

The 2021 Úrvalsdeild karla, also known as Pepsi Max deild karla for sponsorship reasons, was the 110th season of top-flight Icelandic football. Twelve teams contested the league, including the defending champions Valur, who won their 23rd league title in 2020.

== Teams ==
Locations of the 2021 Úrvalsdeild teams

The 2021 Úrvalsdeild was contested by twelve teams, ten of which played in the division the previous year and two teams promoted from 1. deild karla. The bottom two teams from the previous season, Grótta and Fjölnir (both relegated after one year in the top flight), were relegated to the 2021 1. deild karla and were replaced by Keflavík (promoted after a two-year absence) and Leiknir (promoted after a five-year absence), champions and runners-up of the 2020 1. deild karla respectively.

=== Club information ===
Team	Location	Stadium	Capacity
Breiðablik	Kópavogur	Kópavogsvöllur	3,009
FH	Hafnarfjörður	Kaplakriki	6,450
Fylkir	Reykjavík	Floridana völlurinn	1,854
HK	Kópavogur	Kórinn	1,452
ÍA	Akranes	Norðurálsvöllurinn	3,054
KA	Akureyri	Akureyrarvöllur	1,645
Keflavík	Reykjanesbær	Keflavíkurvöllur	5,200
KR	Reykjavík	Alvogenvöllurinn	3,333
Leiknir	Reykjavík	Leiknisvöllur	1,025
Stjarnan	Garðabær	Samsung völlurinn	1,440
Valur	Reykjavík	Valsvöllur	2,465
Víkingur R.	Reykjavík	Víkingsvöllur	2,023

=== Personnel and kits ===
Team	Manager	Captain	Kit manufacturer	Shirt sponsor
Breiðablik	(Iceland) Óskar Hrafn Þorvaldsson	(Iceland) Höskuldur Gunnlaugsson	Errea	Vörður
FH	(Iceland) Ólafur Jóhannesson	(Iceland) Matthías Vilhjálmsson	Nike	Auður
Fylkir	(Iceland) Atli Sveinn Þórarinsson (Iceland) Ólafur Stígsson	(Iceland) Ragnar Bragi Sveinsson	Macron	Eykt
HK	(Iceland) Brynjar Gunnarsson	(Iceland) Gudmundur Thór Júlíusson	Macron	MótX
ÍA	(Iceland) Joey Guðjónsson	(Iceland) Óttar Bjarni Gudmundsson	Errea	Norðurál
KA	(Iceland) Arnar Grétarsson	(Iceland) Ásgeir Sigurgeirsson	Errea	N1
Keflavík	(Iceland) Sigurður Ragnar Eyjólfsson (Iceland) Eysteinn Hauksson	(Iceland) Magnús Þór Magnússon	Nike	Geysir
KR	(Iceland) Rúnar Kristinsson	(Iceland) Óskar Örn Hauksson	Nike	Alvotech
Leiknir	(Iceland) Sigurdur Heidar Höskuldsson	(Iceland) Sævar Atli Magnússon	Errea	Víkurverk
Stjarnan	(Iceland) Þorvaldur Örlygsson	(Iceland) Daníel Laxdal	Uhlsport	Tryggingamiðstöðin
Valur	(Iceland) Heimir Guðjónsson	(Iceland) Haukur Páll Sigurðsson	Macron	Bose
Víkingur R.	(Iceland) Arnar Gunnlaugsson	(Iceland) Sölvi Ottesen	Macron	Grant Thornton

== League table ==
Pos	Team	Pld	W	D	L	GF	GA	GD	Pts	Qualification or relegation
1	Víkingur Reykjavík (C)	22	14	6	2	38	21	+17	48	Qualification for the Champions League preliminary round
2	Breiðablik	22	15	2	5	55	21	+34	47	Qualification for the Europa Conference League first qualifying round
3	KR	22	12	5	5	35	19	+16	41	Qualification for the Europa Conference League first qualifying round
4	KA	22	12	4	6	36	20	+16	40	
5	Valur	22	12	3	7	37	26	+11	39	
6	FH	22	9	6	7	39	26	+13	33	
7	Stjarnan	22	6	4	12	24	36	−12	22	
8	Leiknir	22	6	4	12	18	32	−14	22	
9	ÍA	22	6	3	13	29	44	−15	21	
10	Keflavík	22	6	3	13	23	38	−15	21	
11	HK (R)	22	5	5	12	21	39	−18	20	Relegation to 1. deild karla
12	Fylkir (R)	22	3	7	12	18	51	−33	16	Relegation to 1. deild karla

Source: Flashscore KSI (in Icelandic)
Rules for classification: 1) Points; 2) Goal difference; 3) Goals scored; 4) Head-to-head points; 5) Head-to-head goal difference; 6) Head-to-head goals scored; 7) Head-to-head away goals scored; 8) Play-off (only for deciding champion); 9) Draw.
(C) Champions; (R) Relegated

== Fixtures and results ==
Each team was originally scheduled to play home and away once against every other team for a total of 22 games each.

Home \ Away	BRE	FH	FYL	HK	ÍA	KA	KEF	KR	LEI	STJ	VAL	VÍK
Breiðablik	—	4–0	2–0	3–0	2–1	2–0	4–0	0–2	4–0	4–0	3–0	4–0
FH	1–0	—	1–0	2–4	5–1	1–1	0–0	0–2	5–0	1–1	1–1	1–2
Fylkir	0–7	0–2	—	1–2	3–1	2–1	4–2	1–1	0–0	1–1	0–6	0–3
HK	2–3	1–3	2–2	—	1–3	0–0	1–0	0–1	2–1	1–0	0–3	0–0
ÍA	2–3	0–3	5–0	4–1	—	0–2	2–2	0–2	3–1	0–0	2–1	1–1
KA	0–2	2–2	2–0	2–0	3–0	—	2–1	1–2	3–0	2–1	0–1	0–1
Keflavík	2–0	0–5	1–1	2–0	2–3	1–4	—	0–2	1–0	2–0	1–2	1–2
KR	1–1	1–1	4–0	1–1	3–1	1–3	1–0	—	2–1	1–2	2–3	1–2
Leiknir	3–3	2–1	3–0	0–0	2–0	0–1	0–1	0–2	—	2–0	1–0	2–1
Stjarnan	1–3	0–4	2–0	2–1	4–0	0–1	2–3	0–2	0–0	—	2–1	2–3
Valur	3–1	2–0	1–1	3–2	2–0	1–4	2–1	1–0	1–0	1–2	—	1–1
Víkingur Reykjavík	3–0	2–0	2–2	3–0	1–0	2–2	1–0	1–1	2–0	3–2	2–1	—

Source: KSÍ (in Icelandic)
Legend: Blue = home team win; Yellow = draw; Red = away team win.

== Top goalscorers ==
As of 25 September 2021

Rank	Player	Club	Goals
1	(Denmark) Nikolaj Hansen	Víkingur Reykjavik	16
2	(Iceland) Hallgrímur Mar Steingrímsson	KA	11
2	(Iceland) Árni Vilhjálmsson	Breiðablik	11
4	(Iceland) Sævar Atli Magnússon	Leiknir	10
4	(Australia) Joey Gibbs	Keflavík	10
6	(Scotland) Steven Lennon	FH	9
6	(Denmark) Patrick Pedersen	Valur	9
6	(Iceland) Kristinn Steindórsson	Breiðablik	9
9	(Iceland) Matthías Vilhjálmsson	Stjarnan	7
9	(Iceland) Ásgeir Sigurgeirsson	KA	7
9	(Iceland) Kjartan Finnbogason	KR	7
