= 2022 Besta deild karla =

Besta deild karla
- Season: 2022
- Dates: 18 April – 29 October 2022
- Champions: Breiðablik
- Relegated: Leiknir; ÍA
- Champions League: Breiðablik
- Europa Conference League: Víkingur Reykjavík; KA
- Matches: 132
- Goals: 461 (3.49 per match)
- Top goalscorer: Nökkvi Þeyr Þórisson (17 goals)
- Biggest home win: Víkingur Reykjavík 9–0 Leiknir (7 September 2022)
- Biggest away win: Leiknir 1–7 Keflavík (22 October 2022)
- Highest scoring: Fram 4–8 Keflavík (17 September 2022)
- Longest winning run: 9 matches Breiðablik
- Longest unbeaten run: 13 matches Víkingur Reykjavík
- Longest winless run: 12 matches ÍBV
- Longest losing run: 7 matches ÍA
- All statistics correct as of 10 October 2022.

The 2022 Besta deild karla was the 111th season of top-flight Icelandic football. Twelve teams contested the league, including the defending champions Víkingur Reykjavík, who won their sixth league title in 2021. It was the first season of the league after it was rebranded as Besta deild karla.

== Teams ==
Locations of the 2022 Besta deild karla teams

The 2022 Besta deild karla is contested by twelve teams, ten of which played in the division the previous year and two teams promoted from 1. deild karla. The bottom two teams from the previous season, HK and Fylkir (both relegated after one year in the top flight), were relegated to the 2022 1. deild karla and were replaced by Knattspyrnufélagið Fram (promoted after a seven-year absence) and ÍBV (promoted after a two-year absence), champions and runners-up of the 2020 1. deild karla respectively.

=== Club information ===
Team	Location	Stadium	Capacity
Breiðablik	Kópavogur	Kópavogsvöllur	3,009
FH	Hafnarfjörður	Kaplakriki	6,450
Fram	Reykjavík	Laugardalsvöllur	9,800
ÍA	Akranes	Norðurálsvöllurinn	3,054
ÍBV	Vestmannaeyjar	Hásteinsvöllur	2,300 (534 seated)
KA	Akureyri	Akureyrarvöllur (Note: Due to pitch issues, KA held home games at Dalvíkurvöllur in Dalvík.)	1,645
Keflavík	Reykjanesbær	Keflavíkurvöllur	5,200
KR	Reykjavík	Alvogenvöllurinn	3,333
Leiknir	Reykjavík	Leiknisvöllur	1,025
Stjarnan	Garðabær	Samsung völlurinn	1,440
Valur	Reykjavík	Valsvöllur	2,465
Víkingur R.	Reykjavík	Víkingsvöllur	2,023

== League table ==
Pos	Team	Pld	W	D	L	GF	GA	GD	Pts	Qualification or relegation
1	Breiðablik	22	16	3	3	55	23	+32	51	Qualification for the Championship Round
2	Víkingur Reykjavík	22	12	7	3	58	32	+26	43	Qualification for the Championship Round
3	KA	22	13	4	5	45	26	+19	43	Qualification for the Championship Round
4	Valur	22	9	5	8	38	32	+6	32	Qualification for the Championship Round
5	KR	22	7	10	5	37	34	+3	31	Qualification for the Championship Round
6	Stjarnan	22	8	7	7	40	42	−2	31	Qualification for the Championship Round
7	Keflavík	22	8	4	10	39	40	−1	28	Qualification for the Relegation Round
8	Fram	22	5	10	7	44	51	−7	25	Qualification for the Relegation Round
9	ÍBV	22	4	8	10	33	44	−11	20	Qualification for the Relegation Round
10	Leiknir	22	5	5	12	21	49	−28	20	Qualification for the Relegation Round
11	FH	22	4	7	11	27	35	−8	19	Qualification for the Relegation Round
12	ÍA	22	3	6	13	24	53	−29	15	Qualification for the Relegation Round

Source: Flashscore, KSI (in Icelandic), Soccerway
Rules for classification: 1) Points; 2) Goal difference; 3) Goals scored; 4) Head-to-head points; 5) Head-to-head goal difference; 6) Head-to-head goals scored; 7) Head-to-head away goals scored; 8) Play-off (only for deciding champion); 9) Draw.

== Fixtures and results ==
Each team was originally scheduled to play home and away once against every other team for a total of 22 games each.

Home \ Away	BRE	FH	FRA	ÍA	ÍBV	KA	KEF	KR	LEI	STJ	VAL	VÍK
Breiðablik	—	3–0	4–3	3–1	3–0	4–1	4–1	4–0	4–0	3–2	1–0	1–1
FH	0–0	—	4–2	6–1	2–0	0–3	3–0	2–3	2–2	1–1	2–2	0–3
Fram	0–2	1–0	—	1–1	3–3	2–2	4–8	1–4	4–1	2–2	3–2	3–3
ÍA	1–5	1–1	0–4	—	2–1	0–3	0–2	4–4	1–2	0–3	1–2	3–0
ÍBV	0–0	4–1	2–2	0–0	—	0–3	2–2	1–2	1–1	3–1	3–2	0–3
KA	2–1	1–0	2–2	3–0	4–3	—	3–2	0–1	1–0	0–2	1–1	2–3
Keflavík	2–3	2–1	3–1	0–1	3–3	1–3	—	0–0	3–0	2–2	0–1	0–3
KR	0–1	0–0	1–1	3–3	4–0	0–0	1–0	—	1–1	3–1	3–3	0–3
Leiknir	1–2	0–0	1–2	1–0	1–4	0–5	1–2	4–3	—	0–3	1–0	0–0
Stjarnan	5–2	2–1	1–1	2–2	1–0	2–4	0–2	1–1	0–3	—	1–0	2–2
Valur	3–2	2–0	1–1	4–0	2–1	0–1	0–3	2–1	2–1	6–1	—	1–3
Víkingur R	0–3	2–1	4–1	3–2	2–2	2–1	4–1	2–2	9–0	4–5	2–2	—

Source: KSÍ (in Icelandic), Soccerway
Legend: Blue = home team win; Yellow = draw; Red = away team win.

== Championship round ==
Pos	Team	Pld	W	D	L	GF	GA	GD	Pts	Qualification	BRE	KA	VÍK	KR	STJ	VAL
1	Breiðablik (C)	27	20	3	4	66	27	+39	63	Qualification for the Champions League preliminary round	—	—	1–0	0–1	3–0	—
2	KA	27	16	5	6	54	30	+24	53	Qualification for the Europa Conference League first qualifying round (Note: Víkingur Reykjavík entered the Europa Conference League first qualifying round as 2022 Icelandic Cup winners.)	1–2	—	—	1–0	—	2–0
3	Víkingur Reykjavík	27	13	9	5	66	41	+25	48	Qualification for the Europa Conference League first qualifying round	—	2–2	—	2–2	—	3–2
4	KR	27	9	11	7	42	40	+2	38		—	—	—	—	0–2	2–1
5	Stjarnan	27	10	7	10	44	52	−8	37		—	0–3	2–1	—	—	—
6	Valur	27	10	5	12	46	44	+2	35		2–5	—	—	—	3–0	—

Source: Soccerway
Legend: Blue = home team win; Yellow = draw; Red = away team win.
Rules for classification: 1) Points; 2) Goal difference; 3) Goals scored; 4) Head-to-head points; 5) Head-to-head goal difference; 6) Head-to-head away goals scored; 7) Play-off
(Note: Play-off is only played if need to decide champion, teams for relegation or UEFA competition and will be played on a neutral ground).
(C) Champions

== Relegation round ==
Pos	Team	Pld	W	D	L	GF	GA	GD	Pts	Qualification	KEF	ÍBV	FRA	FH	ÍA	LEI
7	Keflavík	27	11	4	12	56	48	+8	37		—	—	4–0	2–3	3–2	—
8	ÍBV	27	8	8	11	43	50	−7	32		2–1	—	—	2–1	—	1–0
9	Fram	27	7	10	10	53	63	−10	31		—	1–3	—	3–0	—	3–2
10	FH	27	6	7	14	36	46	−10	25		—	—	—	—	1–2	4–2
11	ÍA (R)	27	6	7	14	36	63	−27	25	Relegation to 1. delid karla	—	3–2	3–2	—	—	—
12	Leiknir (R)	27	5	6	16	28	66	−38	21	Relegation to 1. delid karla	1–7	—	—	—	2–2	—

Source: Soccerway
Legend: Blue = home team win; Yellow = draw; Red = away team win.
Rules for classification: 1) Points; 2) Goal difference; 3) Goals scored; 4) Head-to-head points; 5) Head-to-head goal difference; 6) Head-to-head away goals scored; 7) Play-off
(Note: Play-off is only played if need to decide champion, teams for relegation or UEFA competition and will be played on a neutral ground).
(R) Relegated

== Top scorers ==
As of 29 October 2022

Rank	Player	Club	Goals
1	(Iceland) Nökkvi Þeyr Þórisson (Note: Nökkvi Þeyr Þórisson was awarded the top scorer award as he played fewer games than Guðmundur Magnússon.)	KA	17
2	(Iceland) Guðmundur Magnússon	Fram	17
3	(Iceland) Ísak Snær Þorvaldsson	Breiðablik	14
4	(Faroe Islands) Patrik Johannesen	Keflavík	12
5	(Iceland) Jason Daði Svanþórsson	Breiðablik	11
5	(Iceland) Emil Atlason	Stjarnan	11
7	(Iceland) Andri Rúnar Bjarnason	ÍBV	10
8	(Iceland) Dagur Dan Þórhallsson	Breiðablik	9
8	(Iceland) Helgi Guðjónsson	Víkingur Reykjavík	9
8	(Iceland) Matthías Vilhjálmsson	FH	9
8	(Iceland) Eyþór Aron Wöhler	ÍA	9
8	(Iceland) Hallgrímur Mar Steingrímsson	KA	9
