= Damir Muminovic =

Icelandic footballer (born 1990)

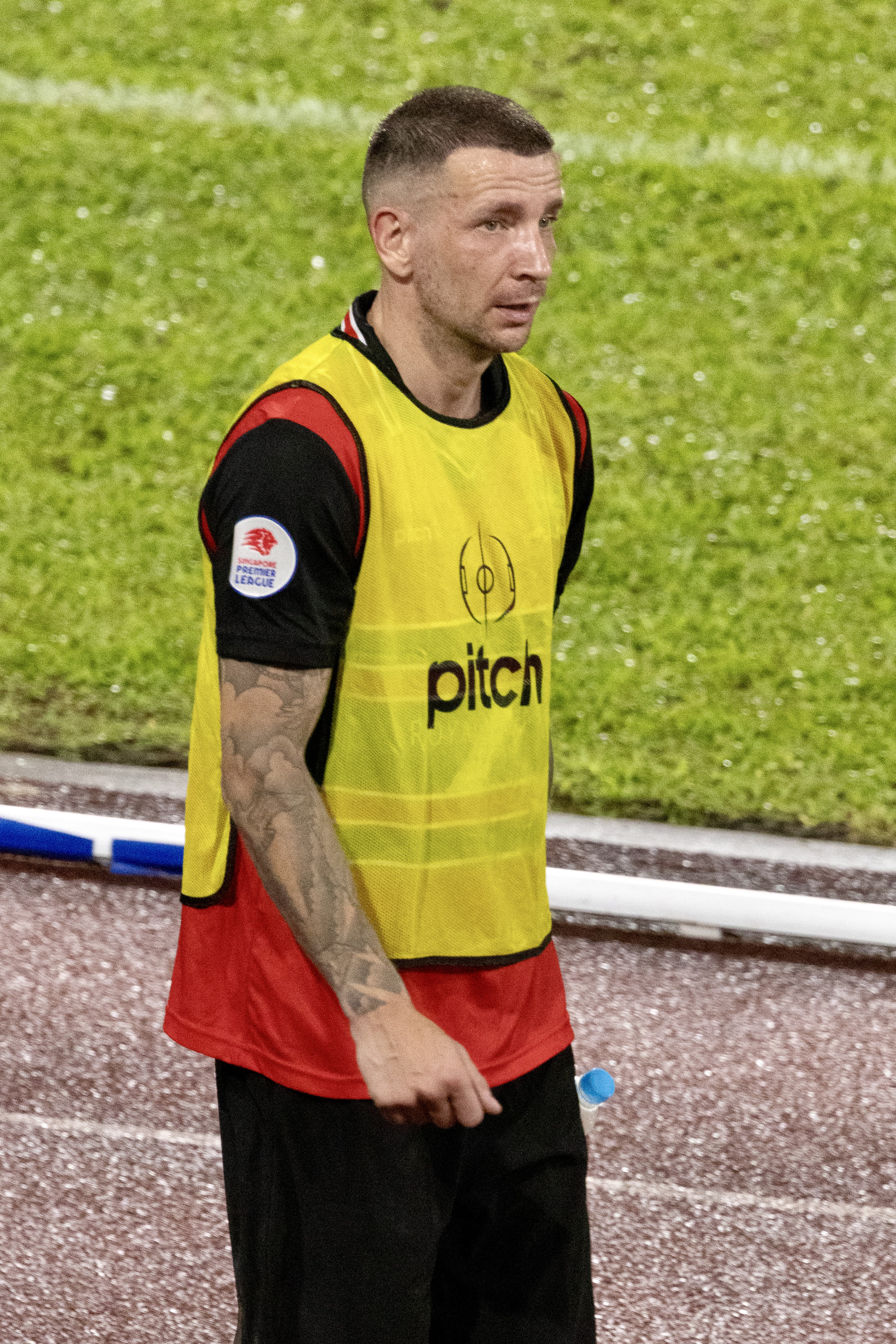
- Muminovic with DPMM in 2025

Personal information
- Date of birth: 13 May 1990 (age 36)
- Place of birth: Zaječar, SFR Yugoslavia
- Height: 1.89 m (6 ft 2 in)
- Position: Defender

Team information
- Current team: Grindavík
- Number: 4

Youth career
- –2007: HK

Senior career*
Years	Team	Apps	(Gls)
2007–2011	HK	35	(0)
2007	→ Ýmir (loan)	7	(0)
2009	→ Ýmir (loan)	10	(2)
2010	→ Hvöt Blönduós (loan)	9	(0)
2011	→ Ýmir (loan)	8	(1)
2012	Leiknir Reykjavík	17	(2)
2013	Víkingur Ólafsvík	22	(2)
2014–2024	Breiðablik	229	(12)
2025	DPMM	14	(0)
2025	Breiðablik	13	(1)
2026–	Grindavík	20	(0)

International career^{‡}
2022–	Iceland	7	(0)
- * Club domestic league appearances and goals as of 13 September 2026 ‡ National team caps and goals as of 18 March 2026

Damir Muminovic (Serbian Cyrillic: Дамир Муминовић; born 13 May 1990) is a professional Icelandic footballer who plays as a defender for Grindavík. Born in Serbia, he plays for the Iceland national team.

== Club career ==
Having moved to Iceland aged 10, he started his career with HK in Kópavogur where he had been playing youth football since coming to Iceland. During his time with HK he also had loan spells in the lower tiers with HK's B side Ýmir and with Hvöt Blönduós.

He switched to Leiknir Reykjavík before the 2012 season and then to Úrvalsdeild club Víkingur Ólafsvík before the 2013 season. Before the 2014 season he switched to Úrvalsdeild club Breiðablik, HK's rival Kópavogur club, where he has established himself in the side.

After 10 years and two championships with Breiðablik, he left the club after a successful 2024 season to join DPMM, a team from Brunei playing in the Singapore Premier League. They had announced his signing as early as August, and was unveiled on 19 December. He made his debut for the club on 13 January 2025 in a 4–2 loss to Lion City Sailors. He decided not to stay in Southeast Asia at the end of the season.

Muminovic returned to Breiðablik and featured in the club's UEFA Conference League campaign, playing the 90 minutes in their victory over Shamrock Rovers. He was told by the club that his contract will not be renewed beyond 2025 and he subsequently signed for Grindavík of the Icelandic second tier.

== International career ==
He made his debut with the national team in the friendly match against South Korea on 15 January 2022, playing the full 90 minutes.

== Career statistics ==
As of 11 May 2026

Club	Season	League			Cup		Continental		Total	
Club	Season	Division	Apps	Goals	Apps	Goals	Apps	Goals	Apps	Goals
Leiknir Reykjavík	2010	1. deild karla	3	0	0	0	0	0	3	0
Leiknir Reykjavík	2011	1. deild karla	10	0	0	0	0	0	10	0
Leiknir Reykjavík	Total		13	0	0	0	0	0	13	0
Leiknir Reykjavík	2012	1. deild karla	17	2	0	0	0	0	17	2
Víkingur	2013	Úrvalsdeild	22	2	2	0	0	0	24	2
Breiðablik	2014	Úrvalsdeild	15	2	2	0	0	0	17	2
Breiðablik	2015	Úrvalsdeild	21	1	1	0	0	0	22	1
Breiðablik	2016	Úrvalsdeild	20	2	2	0	2	0	24	2
Breiðablik	2017	Úrvalsdeild	22	1	10	0	0	0	32	1
Breiðablik	2018	Úrvalsdeild	22	0	5	0	0	0	27	0
Breiðablik	2019	Úrvalsdeild	21	1	4	0	2	0	27	1
Breiðablik	2020	Úrvalsdeild	15	1	3	0	1	0	19	1
Breiðablik	2021	Úrvalsdeild	22	0	1	0	6	1	29	1
Breiðablik	2022	Besta deild karla	25	1	5	0	6	0	36	1
Breiðablik	2023	Besta deild karla	22	2	4	0	10	1	36	3
Breiðablik	2024	Besta deild karla	24	1	1	0	4	0	29	1
Breiðablik	Total		229	12	38	0	31	2	298	14
DPMM	2024–25	Singapore Premier League	14	0	6	0	0	0	20	0
Breiðablik	2025	Besta deild karla	12	1	0	0	11	0	23	1
Grindavík	2026	1. deild karla	3	0	1	0	0	0	4	0
Career total			313	17	47	0	42	2	399	19
