= Nikolaj Hansen (footballer, born 1993) =

Danish footballer (born 1993)

Personal information
- Full name: Nikolaj Andreas Hansen
- Date of birth: 15 March 1993 (age 33)
- Place of birth: Ringsted, Denmark
- Height: 1.92 m (6 ft 4 in)
- Position: Striker

Team information
- Current team: Víkingur
- Number: 23

Youth career
- Benløse IF
- Ringsted IF

Senior career*
Years	Team	Apps	(Gls)
2011–2014	FC Vestsjælland	54	(4)
2014–2015	HB Køge	31	(2)
2015–2016	FC Vestsjælland	14	(6)
2016–2017	Valur	13	(4)
2017–	Víkingur	185	(62)
- * Club domestic league appearances and goals as of 1 November 2026

Nikolaj Andreas Hansen (born 15 March 1993) is a Danish professional footballer who plays as a striker for Icelandic club Víkingur.

== Personal life ==
Hansen is of Polish descent through his mother, and holds dual Norwegian-Polish citizenship.

== Honours ==
Víkingur Reykjavík

- Icelandic Cup: 2019, 2021, 2022, 2023
- Icelandic Premier League: 2021, 2023, 2025

Individual

- Icelandic Premier League - Top scorer: 2021
- Icelandic Premier League - Best Player: 2021
