= Elfar Freyr Helgason =

Icelandic professional footballer

Personal information
- Date of birth: 27 July 1989 (age 37)
- Place of birth: Reykjavík, Iceland
- Height: 6 ft 3 in (1.91 m)
- Position: Center back

Team information
- Current team: Valur
- Number: 4

Senior career*
Years	Team	Apps	(Gls)
2009–2011	Breiðablik	43	(1)
2011–2012	AEK Athens	0	(0)
2012	Stabæk	7	(0)
2013	Randers FC	0	(0)
2013–2022	Breiðablik	135	(4)
2017	→ AC Horsens (loan)	5	(1)
2023–	Valur	29	(1)

International career^{‡}
2009–2011	Iceland U21	6	(0)
2011–	Iceland	1	(0)
- * Club domestic league appearances and goals as of 5 August 2024 ‡ National team caps and goals as of 8 January 2023

Elfar Freyr Helgason (born 27 July 1989) is an Icelandic professional footballer who plays for Valur in the Icelandic Premier League as a central defender. Having spent most of his career playing for Breiðablik, he has also had stints abroad for AEK Athens, Stabæk, Randers FC and AC Horsens. Helgason has gained one cap for Iceland and has also represented his country at junior level.

== Club career ==
=== Breiðablik ===
Elfar made his senior debut for Breiðablik in 2009. He went on to play 20 games in league and cup and was a starter in the Final against Fram as Breiðablik won the Icelandic Cup for the first time in its history. In 2010, Elfar was a key player for Breiðablik as the team went on to win the Icelandic League for the first time in their history.

=== Stints abroad ===
In 2011, Elfar signed for Greek club AEK Athens. He made his debut against Lokomotiv Moscow in the UEFA Europa League on 30 October 2011. His second appearance made against Anderlecht in the Europa League on 1 December 2011, but he never had an opportunity in a Super League Greece match.

On 23 July 2012 Elfar signed a short-term contract with Stabæk for a free transfer until the end of the year.

On 31 January 2013, Elfar signed a new short-term contract, this time with Randers FC from Denmark for the spring season of 2013. He became a free agent on 1 July 2013.

=== Return to Breiðablik ===
Elfar signed a two-year contract with Breiðablik on 31 July 2013.

On 6 January 2017, it was confirmed, that AC Horsens had signed Helgason on a loan deal for the rest of the season with a buying option. Helgason played his first game for Horsens on 5 March 2017 against F.C. Copenhagen, that ended with a 5–0 defeat. In April 2017, Breiðablik tried to get him home a bit earlier, if AC Horsens did not intend to sign him permanently. In May 2017 in an interview after scoring in a game against Odense Boldklub Helgason revealed, that he suffered from homesickness and wanted to return to Iceland. Later the same day AC Horsens announced, that they would not exercise the buying option. However, after the season Bo Henriksen stated the club would have a discussion with Helgason if he wanted to remain.

=== Valur ===
In December 2022, Helgason signed a two-year contract with Valur.

== International career ==
Elfar was part of the Icelandic U21 team in the EURO 2011 in Denmark.

On 10 August 2011, Elfar made his senior debut for Iceland against Hungary.

== Honours ==
Breiðablik

- Besta deild karla: 2010, 2022
- Icelandic Cup: 2009
- Icelandic League Cup: 2013, 2015

Valur

- Icelandic League Cup: 2023
