= Viktor Örn Margeirsson =

Icelandic footballer (born 1994)

Personal information
- Full name: Viktor Örn Margeirsson
- Date of birth: 22 July 1994 (age 32)
- Place of birth: Iceland
- Position: Defender

Team information
- Current team: Breiðablik
- Number: 21

Youth career
- –2013: Breiðablik

Senior career*
Years	Team	Apps	(Gls)
2012–	Breiðablik	207	(13)
2012	→ Augnablik (loan)	6	(0)
2013	→ Augnablik (loan)	4	(0)
2014	→ HK (loan)	19	(0)
2017	→ ÍA (loan)	9	(0)

International career^{‡}
2022–	Iceland	1	(0)
- * Club domestic league appearances and goals as of 1 November 2026 ‡ National team caps and goals as of 6 November 2022

Viktor Örn Margeirsson (born 22 July 1994) is an Icelandic footballer who plays as a defender for Breiðablik and the Iceland national team.

== Club career ==
Viktor has played his entire career with Breiðablik, apart from a few loan spells.

== International career ==
Viktor Örn made his international debut for Iceland on 6 November 2022 in a friendly match against Saudi Arabia.

== Personal life ==
His brother is fellow footballer Finnur Orri Margeirsson.
