= Jóhannes Harðarson =

Icelandic footballer and coach

Personal information
- Full name: Jóhannes Þór Harðarson
- Date of birth: 28 July 1976 (age 50)
- Place of birth: Iceland
- Height: 1.77 m (5 ft 9 1/2 in)
- Position: Midfielder

Senior career*
Years	Team	Apps	(Gls)
1995–2000	ÍA Akranes	73	(5)
2000–2001	MVV Maastricht	16	(0)
2001–2002	FC Groningen	3	(0)
2002–2003	→ BV Veendam (loan)	12	(1)
2003–2004	FC Groningen	2	(0)
2004–2008	IK Start	47	(2)
2008–2013	Flekkerøy IL		

International career^{‡}
2005	Iceland	2	(0)

Managerial career
- 2013–2014: Fløy
- 2015: ÍBV Vestmannaeyjar
- 2017–2019: Start (assistant)
- 2019–2021: Start
- 2021–2023: Fløy
- 2025–: Start (assistant)
- * Club domestic league appearances and goals as of 10 September 2007 ‡ National team caps and goals as of 10 September 2007

Jóhannes "Joey" Harðarson (born 28 July 1976) is an Icelandic football coach and former player. He was most recently the head coach of Norwegian First Division club Start.

== Club career ==
Before the 2004 season, he moved to Norwegian club IK Start and helped secure their promotion. His previous clubs include IA Akranes and the Dutch team FC Groningen. When leaving Start, he joined the smaller local club Flekkerøy IL.

== Coaching career ==
Harðarson became interim head coach at IK Start, after Kjetil Rekdal left the position in April 2019. On 10 July 2019, Start announced that Harðarson would coach the team for the rest of the season. On 23 October 2019, Start announced that Joey Harðarson had agreed to a contract as head coach on permanent basis till the end of the 2021 season. Start finished the 2019 season in third place and qualified for promotion play-offs. Harðarson's Start won promotion to Eliteserien on the away goals rule after a 5–5 draw on aggregate against Lillestrøm in the play-off final. He was sacked on 14 June 2021.

== International career ==
Harðarson has been capped twice for Iceland.
