= Oliver Sigurjónsson =

Icelandic footballer

Personal information
- Date of birth: 3 March 1995 (age 31)
- Place of birth: Iceland
- Height: 1.74 m (5 ft 9 in)
- Position: Midfielder

Team information
- Current team: Afturelding
- Number: 30

Youth career
- –2011: Breiðablik
- 2012–2014: AGF

Senior career*
Years	Team	Apps	(Gls)
2014–2017	Breiðablik	46	(3)
2017–2019	Bodø/Glimt	4	(0)
2018	→ Breiðablik (loan)	20	(2)
2020–2024	Breiðablik	86	(0)
2025–	Afturelding	16	(0)

International career^{‡}
2010–2012	Iceland U-17	22	(7)
2011–2014	Iceland U-19	19	(6)
2013–2016	Iceland U-21	9	(2)
2015–	Iceland	2	(0)
- * Club domestic league appearances and goals as of 2 November 2025 ‡ National team caps and goals as of 27 March 2017

Oliver Sigurjónsson (born 3 March 1995) is an Icelandic football midfielder, who currently plays for Afturelding as a midfielder.

== Club career ==
Oliver started his career with local club Breiðablik before signing with AGF in Denmark when he was 16 years old. In 2014, he moved back to Breiðablik to start his senior career. On 25 July 2017 he signed a three years contract for Norwegian side Bodø/Glimt.

== Career statistics ==
=== Club ===
As of match played 29 July 2021

Appearances and goals by club, season and competition
Club	Season	League			National Cup		Europe		Other		Total	
Club	Season	Division	Apps	Goals	Apps	Goals	Apps	Goals	Apps	Goals	Apps	Goals
Breiðablik	2014	Úrvalsdeild	5	0	0	0	-		-		5	0
Breiðablik	2015	Úrvalsdeild	19	2	0	0	-		-		19	2
Breiðablik	2016	Úrvalsdeild	18	1	2	0	2	1	-		22	2
Breiðablik	2017	Úrvalsdeild	4	0	0	0	-		-		4	0
Breiðablik	Total		46	3	2	0	2	1	-	-	50	4
Bodø/Glimt	2017	1. divisjon	2	0	0	0	-		-		2	0
Bodø/Glimt	2018	Eliteserien	0	0	0	0	-		-		0	0
Bodø/Glimt	2019	Eliteserien	2	0	1	0	-		-		3	0
Bodø/Glimt	Total		4	0	1	0	-	-	-	-	5	0
Breiðablik (loan)	2018	Úrvalsdeild	20	2	3	1	-		-		23	3
Breiðablik (loan)	Total		20	2	3	1	-	-	-	-	23	3
Breiðablik	2020	Úrvalsdeild	17	0	3	0	1	0	-		21	0
Breiðablik	2021	Úrvalsdeild	10	0	1	0	4	0	-		15	0
Breiðablik	Total		27	0	4	0	5	0	-	-	21	0
Career total			97	5	10	1	7	1	-	-	114	7

== International career ==
Oliver made his first senior international appearance on 17 November 2015 in a match against Slovakia, when he came on as a substitute for Jóhann Berg Guðmundsson with ten minutes left of the match.
