= Renee Troost =

Dutch footballer

Personal information
- Full name: Renee Gerard Japp Troost
- Date of birth: 6 June 1988 (age 38)
- Place of birth: Bussum, Netherlands
- Height: 1.91 m (6 ft 3 in)
- Position: Centre back

Team information
- Current team: Rijnsburgse Boys
- Number: 6

Senior career*
| Years | Team | Apps | (Gls) |
| 2007–2011 | Almere City | 78 | (4) |
| 2011–2012 | AGOVV Apeldoorn | 22 | (2) |
| 2012–2013 | Breiðablik | 39 | (1) |
| 2014– | Rijnsburgse Boys | 31 | (1) |
- * Club domestic league appearances and goals as of 11 August 2015

Renee Gerard Japp Troost (born 6 June 1988) is a Dutch professional footballer who plays as a centre back for Rijnsburgse Boys in the Dutch Topklasse. He formerly played for Almere City, AGOVV Apeldoorn and Breiðablik.
