= Davíð Kristján Ólafsson =

Icelandic footballer (born 1995)

Personal information
- Date of birth: 15 May 1995 (age 31)
- Place of birth: Kópavogur, Iceland
- Height: 1.84 m (6 ft 0 in)
- Position: Left-back

Team information
- Current team: Polonia Warsaw
- Number: 20

Youth career
- Breiðablik

Senior career*
Years	Team	Apps	(Gls)
2013–2018	Breiðablik	81	(3)
2013	→ Augnablik (loan)	6	(4)
2019–2021	Aalesund	69	(3)
2022–2024	Kalmar FF	59	(2)
2024–2026	Cracovia	49	(5)
2026	AEL	17	(0)
2026–	Polonia Warsaw	0	(0)

International career
2014	Iceland U19	5	(0)
2016	Iceland U21	1	(0)
2019–2023	Iceland	15	(1)
- * Club domestic league appearances and goals as of 14 June 2026

Davíð Kristján Ólafsson (born 15 May 1995) is an Icelandic professional footballer who plays as a left-back for I liga club Polonia Warsaw.

== Club career ==
Ólafsson signed for Aalesund in 2019. He moved to Kalmar FF on 12 January 2022. On 25 February 2024, Polish side Cracovia announced the signing of Ólafsson on a two-and-a-half-year deal. On 12 January 2026, he signed with Greek side AEL until the end of the season.

On 23 June 2026, Ólafsson returned to Poland, joining second-tier side Polonia Warsaw on a deal until the end of the 2027–28 season.

== International career ==
He made his debut for the Iceland national team on 15 January 2019 in a friendly against Estonia, as a starter.

== Career statistics ==
=== International ===
Appearances and goals by national team and year
National team	Year	Apps	Goals
Iceland
Iceland	2019	1	0
Iceland	2020	1	0
Iceland	2022	9	0
Iceland	2023	4	1
Total		15	1

Scores and results list Iceland's goal tally first, score column indicates score after each Ólafsson goal.

List of international goals scored by Davíð Kristján Ólafsson
No.	Cap	Date	Venue	Opponent	Score	Result	Competition
1	15	26 March 2023	Rheinpark Stadion, Vaduz, Liechtenstein	Liechtenstein	1–0	7–0	UEFA Euro 2024 qualifying

== Acting ==
In 2006, he auditioned and played Little Sportacus in 1 episode in LazyTown.

== Honours ==
Breiðablik

- Icelandic League Cup: 2015
