= Gísli Eyjólfsson =

Icelandic footballer (born 1994)

Personal information
- Full name: Gísli Eyjólfsson
- Date of birth: 31 May 1994 (age 32)
- Place of birth: Kópavogur, Iceland
- Height: 1.80 m (5 ft 11 in)
- Position: Central midfielder

Team information
- Current team: ÍA
- Number: 10

Youth career
- –2012: Breiðablik

Senior career*
Years	Team	Apps	(Gls)
2012–2024	Breiðablik	156	(31)
2012–2013	→ Augnablik (loan)	10	(2)
2014	→ Haukar (loan)	17	(1)
2016	→ Víkingur Ólafsvík (loan)	3	(0)
2019	→ Mjällby AIF (loan)	12	(0)
2024-2025	Halmstads BK	47	(1)
2026-	ÍA	23	(6)

International career^{‡}
2021–	Iceland	4	(0)
- * Club domestic league appearances and goals as of 1 November 2026 ‡ National team caps and goals as of 14 March 2022

Gísli Eyjólfsson (born 31 May 1994) is an Icelandic footballer who plays as a central midfielder for ÍA and the Iceland national team.

== Career ==
Gísli Eyjólfsson made his international debut for Iceland on 29 May 2021 in a friendly match against Mexico in Arlington, Texas.

== Career statistics ==
=== International ===
As of 8 June 2021

Iceland
Year	Apps	Goals
2021	2	0
Total	2	0
