= Guðjón Pétur Lýðsson =

Icelandic footballer

Personal information
- Full name: Guðjón Pétur Lýðsson
- Date of birth: 28 December 1987 (age 38)
- Place of birth: Reykjavík, Iceland
- Height: 1.80 m (5 ft 11 in)
- Position: Midfielder

Team information
- Current team: Haukar (manager)

Senior career*
Years	Team	Apps	(Gls)
2006	Haukar	13	(1)
2007	Breiðablik	1	(0)
2007–2008	Stjarnan	13	(0)
2008	UMF Álftanes	7	(4)
2009–2010	Haukar	42	(7)
2011–2012	Valur	37	(9)
2011	→ Helsingborg (loan)	3	(0)
2013–2015	Breiðablik	59	(17)
2016–2018	Valur	53	(13)
2018	KA	0	(0)
2019-2020	Breiðablik	25	(2)
2020	Stjarnan	13	(2)
2021-2022	ÍBV	30	(6)
2022-2023	Grindavík	27	(4)
2024-2025	Haukar	38	(4)
Total		361	(69)
- * Club domestic league appearances and goals

Guðjón Pétur Lýðsson (born 28 December 1987) is a former Icelandic footballer who played as a midfielder. He is currently the manager of Haukar

== Club career ==
Guðjón Pétur Lýðsson was an important factor in the team of Haukar that promoted to Úrvalsdeild. After the club was relegated, he was sold to Valur and in the end of the season he went on loan to Helsingborg, where he played couple of matches and won the Swedish league Allsvenskan. After his time at Helsingborg, he went back to play for Valur. In 2013, he was sold to Breiðablik, where he was a key player in the squad. After the 2015 season he rejoined Valur. In 2017 they won the Icelandic League.

On 12 November 2018, Guðjón Pétur signed a 3-year contract with Knattspyrnufélag Akureyrar.
