= Mees Siers =

Dutch footballer and coach

Personal information
- Full name: Mees Junior Siers
- Date of birth: 6 October 1987 (age 39)
- Place of birth: Zelhem, Netherlands
- Height: 1.80 m (5 ft 11 in)
- Position: Defensive midfielder

Team information
- Current team: De Graafschap (youth coach)

Youth career
- VV Zelhem
- De Graafschap

Senior career*
Years	Team	Apps	(Gls)
2006–2010	De Graafschap	8	(1)
2010–2012	AGOVV Apeldoorn	60	(0)
2012–2014	Helmond Sport	42	(0)
2014–2015	SønderjyskE	3	(0)
2015–2017	ÍBV	38	(0)
2017	Fjölnir	19	(0)
2018–2019	De Treffers	37	(3)
- * Club domestic league appearances and goals

Mees Siers (born 6 October 1987 in Zelhem) is a retired Dutch professional footballer and current youth coach working at De Graafschap. He formerly played for De Graafschap, AGOVV Apeldoorn and Helmond Sport.

== Coaching career ==
In 2018, Siers did an internship at NEC, working with the youth teams. At the end of the 2018-19 season, Siers retired and became a youth coach at De Graafschap.
