= Jonathan Glenn =

Trinidadian footballer (born 1987)

Personal information
- Full name: Jonathan Ricardo Glenn
- Date of birth: 27 August 1987 (age 39)
- Place of birth: Trinidad and Tobago
- Height: 1.85 m (6 ft 1 in)
- Position: Forward

College career
Years	Team	Apps	(Gls)
2007–2010	Saint Leo University	60	(41)

Senior career*
Years	Team	Apps	(Gls)
2010–2011	Vermont Voltage	20	(5)
2012–2013	Jacksonville United		
2014–2016	ÍBV	32	(16)
2015–2016	→ Breiðablik	23	(9)
2017	Jacksonville Armada	14	(1)
2017	North Carolina	7	(1)
2018	Fylkir	13	(6)
2019–2020	ÍBV	26	(4)

International career
2014–2016	Trinidad and Tobago	6	(1)

Managerial career
- 2022: ÍBV
- 2023–2024: Keflavík
- * Club domestic league appearances and goals

Jonathan Ricardo Glenn (born 27 August 1987) is a Trinidad and Tobago football coach and former player. He played college football for Saint Leo University in the United States before going on a decade long professional career. At international level, he made six appearances for the Trinidad and Tobago national team scoring once.

== Early life ==
Glenn was raised in Maloney Gardens, Tunapuna–Piarco, Trinidad. He attended St. Anthony's College in Diego Martin before moving to the United States to play at Saint Leo University in Florida, where he studied psychology and marketing.

== Playing career ==
=== College ===
In his freshman season at Saint Leo in 2007, Glenn scored 14 goals in 13 matches, ranking fourth in NCAA Division II in goals per match. He received the Sunshine State Conference Freshman of the Year award, and was named a Second Team All-SSC selection, and along with a National Soccer Coaches Association of America (NSCAA)/Adidas All-South Region Second Team award. In 2008, following his sophomore season, he again received Second Team All-SCC and NSCAA/Adidas All-South Region Second Team honours. After scoring 9 goals in 15 games in his junior season, including his first career hat trick in a game against Georgia Southwestern State University, Glenn once again was named to the All-SSC Second Team, and to the Daktronics NCAA Division II All-South Region Second Team. Glenn finished his career at Saint Leo in 2010, and in his senior season he was named to the SSC All-Conference Team, and to the CoSIDA Academic All-District Team. In total, he scored 41 goals across 57 matches in his college career, which was then fifth highest in Saint Leo history.

=== Club ===
Glenn began his club career while still at Saint Leo in 2008 with the Panama City Beach Pirates of the USL Premier Development League, where he played in 5 matches without scoring a goal. He returned to the PDL in 2010, playing for the Vermont Voltage, scoring 5 goals in 20 matches across his two seasons with the club. He then moved to Jacksonville United FC of the National Premier Soccer League, where he was named to the All-Conference team in the Sunshine Conference in 2012.

In February 2014, Glenn moved to Iceland, when he signed for ÍBV of the Úrvalsdeild. He had a successful first season in Iceland, scoring 12 goals in 20 matches, second-most in the league. He received ÍBV's Golden Boot, along with the club's Player of the Year award.

On 28 July 2017, Glenn moved to North Carolina FC alongside teammate Danny Barrow in exchange for Brian Shriver who went to Jacksonville Armada.

In November 2022, he retired from professional football.

=== International ===
After his first season with ÍBV, Glenn was named to the Trinidad and Tobago national team for the 2014 Caribbean Cup. He appeared in two matches in the tournament, coming on as a substitute against Curaçao and Cuba. The Soca Warriors finished runners-up to Jamaica in the tournament.

== Managerial career ==
In November 2021, Glenn was hired as the manager of ÍBV women's football team. Despite the team finishing 6th and playing well above expectations, with Glenn being named the best coach of the first half of the season by Fótbolti.net, he was sacked following the season.

He was the manager of Keflavík women's team from 2023 to 2024.

== Personal life ==
Glenn is married to footballer Þórhildur Ólafsdóttir.
