= Finnur Orri Margeirsson =

Icelandic footballer

Finnur Margeirsson
Personal information
- Full name: Finnur Orri Margeirsson
- Date of birth: 8 March 1991 (age 35)
- Place of birth: Reykjavík, Iceland
- Position: Defender

Team information
- Current team: FH
- Number: 8

Youth career
- –2007: Breiðablik

Senior career*
Years	Team	Apps	(Gls)
2008–2014	Breiðablik	140	(0)
2015	Lillestrøm	27	(0)
2016–2020	KR	89	(1)
2021	Breiðablik	18	(0)
2022–	FH	52	(0)

International career^{‡}
2007	Iceland U16	4	(0)
2007	Iceland U17	5	(0)
2008–2009	Iceland U19	9	(0)
2008–2012	Iceland U21	11	(0)
- * Club domestic league appearances and goals as of 2 November 2024 ‡ National team caps and goals as of 18 April 2023

Finnur Orri Margeirsson (born 8 March 1991) is an Icelandic football defender who plays for FH.

== Personal life ==
His brother is fellow footballer Viktor Örn Margeirsson.
