= Árni Vilhjálmsson =

Icelandic footballer

Personal information
- Date of birth: 9 May 1994 (age 32)
- Place of birth: Reykjavík, Iceland
- Height: 1.81 m (5 ft 11 in)
- Position: Striker

Team information
- Current team: Stjarnan
- Number: 94

Youth career
- –2010: Breiðablik

Senior career*
Years	Team	Apps	(Gls)
2010–2014	Breiðablik	61	(22)
2012	→ Haukar (loan)	8	(1)
2015–2016	Lillestrøm	21	(2)
2016	→ Breiðablik (loan)	12	(6)
2017–2018	Jönköpings Södra	28	(4)
2019	Bruk-Bet Termalica	6	(1)
2019	→ Chornomorets Odesa (loan)	12	(7)
2019–2020	Kolos Kovalivka	15	(5)
2021	Breiðablik	21	(11)
2022	Rodez	13	(2)
2023	Žalgiris	15	(1)
2024	Novara	8	(0)
2024–2025	Al-Taraji		
2025–2026	Al-Sahel		
2026–	Stjarnan	10	(1)

International career
2010–2011	Iceland U17	10	(0)
2011–2012	Iceland U19	10	(8)
2013–2016	Iceland U21	12	(1)
2017	Iceland	1	(0)
- * Club domestic league appearances and goals as of 16 November 2026

Árni Vilhjálmsson (born 9 May 1994) is an Icelandic professional footballer who plays for Stjarnan as a striker.

== Club career ==
In January 2017, Árni joined Swedish side Jönköpings Södra IF. On 28 January 2022, he signed for French club Rodez.

In September 2025, Vilhjálmsson joined Saudi Second Division side Al-Sahel.

== Personal life ==
Árni is in relationship with fellow footballer Sara Björk Gunnarsdóttir, with whom he has a son.

== Career statistics ==
=== Club ===
As of match played 4 May 2016

Appearances and goals by club, season and competition
Club	Season	League			National cup		League cup		Continental		Total	
Club	Season	Division	Apps	Goals	Apps	Goals	Apps	Goals	Apps	Goals	Apps	Goals
Breiðablik	2010	Úrvalsdeild	0	0	0	0	0	0	—		0	0
Breiðablik	2011	Úrvalsdeild	10	1	0	0	2	0	—		11	1
Breiðablik	2012	Úrvalsdeild	10	2	0	0	8	4	5	0	15	2
Breiðablik	2013	Úrvalsdeild	21	9	3	2	8	4	—		24	11
Breiðablik	2014	Úrvalsdeild	20	10	3	2	7	5	—		30	17
Breiðablik	Total		61	22	6	4	25	13	5	0	97	39
Haukar (loan)	2012	1. deild karla	8	1	0	0	0	0	—		8	1
Lillestrøm	2015	Tippeligaen	14	2	0	0	—		—		14	2
Lillestrøm	2016	Tippeligaen	7	0	3	3	—		—		10	3
Lillestrøm	Total		21	2	3	3	—		—		24	5
Breiðablik	2016	Úrvalsdeild	12	6	0	0	0	0	—		12	6
Career total			102	31	9	7	25	13	5	0	141	49

== Honours ==
Breiðablik

- Icelandic League Cup: 2013

Žalgiris

- Lithuanian Supercup: 2023
