= Garðar Örn Hinriksson =

Icelandic football referee

- Born: 10 December 1971 (age 54); Iceland

Domestic
Years	League	Role
1994–2016	Icelandic leagues	Referee

International
Years	League	Role
2004–2009	FIFA listed	Referee

Garðar Örn Hinriksson (born 10 December 1971) is an Icelandic former football referee. He was a FIFA listed referee from 2004 to 2009. He was named the Úrvalsdeild karla Referee of the Year in 2004, 2006 and 2007.

In 1996 he earned the nickname The Red Baron after he gave five players and one coach the red card in a 2. deild karla match between Dalvík and Grótta. As a result, the match was abandoned due to Grótta having too few players left on the pitch. On June 9, 2008, he handed out five red cards in a Úrvalsdeild karla match between Grindavík and Fram. After handing out only one red card during the 2007, he set a league record on June 30, 2008 when he handed out his 9th red card to a player on the season.

Garðar retired from refereeing in May 2016. Shortly after, he was diagnosed with the Parkinson's disease.

== Honours ==
- Úrvalsdeild karla Referee of the Year (3): 2004, 2006, 2007
