= Arnór Sveinn Aðalsteinsson =

Icelandic footballer (born 1986)

Arnór Aðalsteinsson
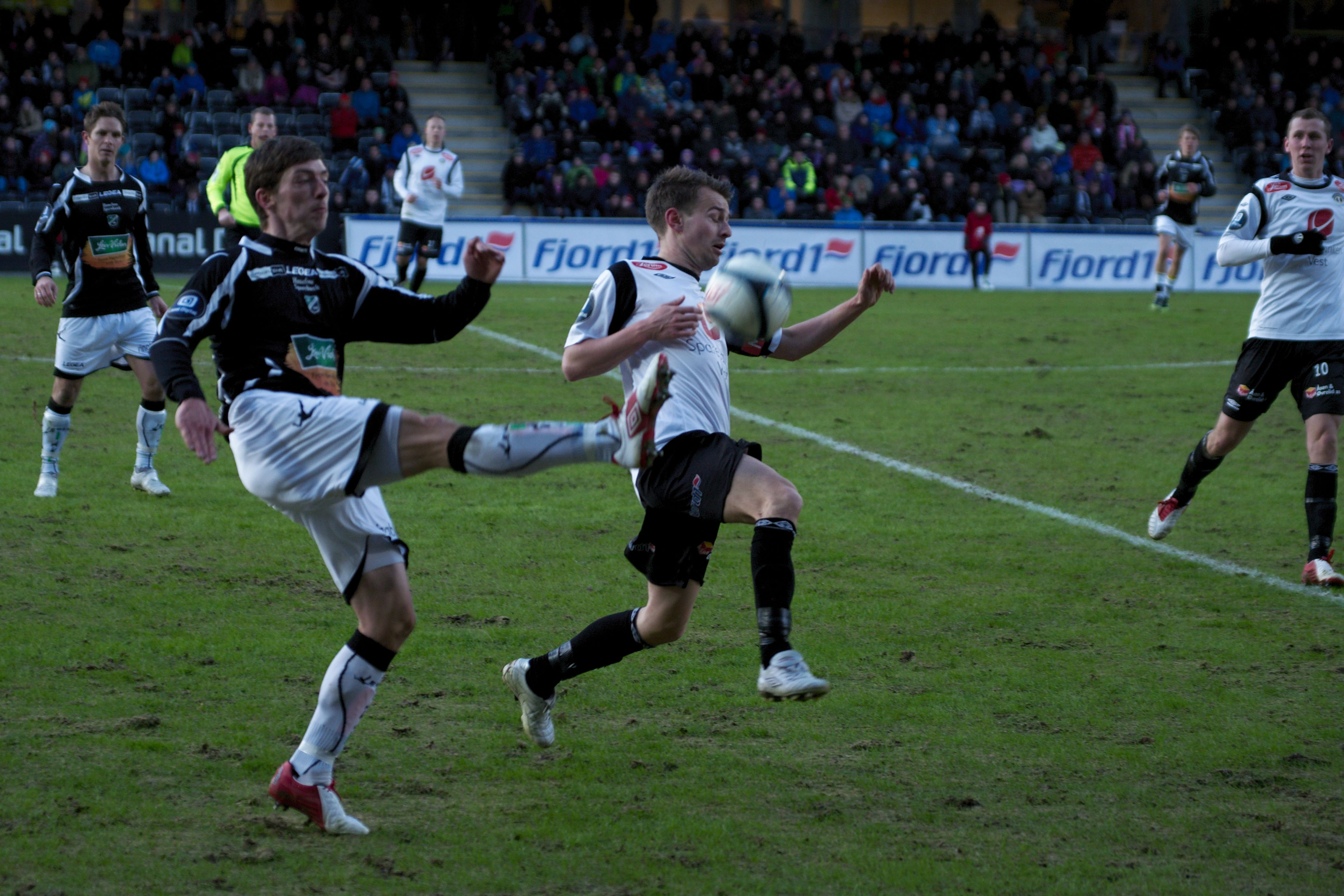
- Arnor Adalsteinsson and Henrik Furebotn

Personal information
- Full name: Arnór Sveinn Aðalsteinsson
- Date of birth: 26 January 1986 (age 40)
- Place of birth: Reykjavík, Iceland
- Height: 1.80 m (5 ft 11 in)
- Position: Defender

Team information
- Current team: Breiðablik
- Number: 5

Youth career
- Breiðablik

Senior career*
Years	Team	Apps	(Gls)
2004–2011	Breiðablik	94	(2)
2011	→ Hønefoss (loan)	11	(0)
2012–2013	Hønefoss	40	(0)
2014–2017	Breiðablik	46	(2)
2017–2022	KR	101	(2)
2023–	Breiðablik	15	(1)

International career^{‡}
2007–2008	Iceland u21	9	(0)
2009–2012	Iceland	12	(0)
- * Club domestic league appearances and goals as of 5 August 2024 ‡ National team caps and goals as of 11 December 2022

Arnór Sveinn Aðalsteinsson (born 26 January 1986) is an Icelandic football player, currently playing for Icelandic football club Breiðablik. He won the Icelandic championship in 2010 and the Icelandic Cup in 2009 with Breiðablik.

== Club career ==
Arnór made his debut for Breiðablik in 2004 in 1. deild karla. He was a key member of Breiðablik's 2010 Úrvalsdeild karla championship team.

He played for Hønefoss from 2011 to 2013 before returning to Breiðablik in January 2014. In November 2016, Arnór Sveinn joined Úrvalsdeild rivals KR.

In November 2022, Arnór Sveinn signed with Breiðablik.

== Club career statistics ==
As of 13 August 2013

Club	Season	League		Cup		League Cup		Europe		Other		Total	
Club	Season	Apps	Goals	Apps	Goals	Apps	Goals	Apps	Goals	Apps	Goals	Apps	Goals
Breiðablik	2004	1	0	0	0	6	0	-	-	-	-	7	0
Breiðablik	2005	14	0	1	0	6	0	-	-	-	-	21	0
Breiðablik	2006	7	0	1	0	5	0	-	-	-	-	13	0
Breiðablik	2007	17	0	3	0	8	0	-	-	-	-	28	0
Breiðablik	2008	19	1	3	0	6	0	-	-	-	-	28	1
Breiðablik	2009	17	0	4	2	7	3	-	-	-	-	28	5
Breiðablik	2010	19	1	1	0	9	1	2	0	1	0	32	2
Hønefoss (loan)	2011	11	0	-	-	-	-	-	-	-	-	11	0
Hønefoss	2012	29	0	1	0	-	-	-	-	-	-	30	0
Hønefoss	2013	11	0	1	0	-	-	-	-	-	-	12	0
Total		145	2	15	2	47	4	2	0	1	0	210	8

Statistics accurate as of match played 4 August 2013

== International career ==
Arnór made his international debut in a friendly match away against Iran in November 2009, coming on as a sub at half time.

== Honours ==
Breiðablik

- Icelandic Premier League (1): 2010
- Icelandic Cup (1): 2009
