= Kristinn Jónsson =

Icelandic footballer

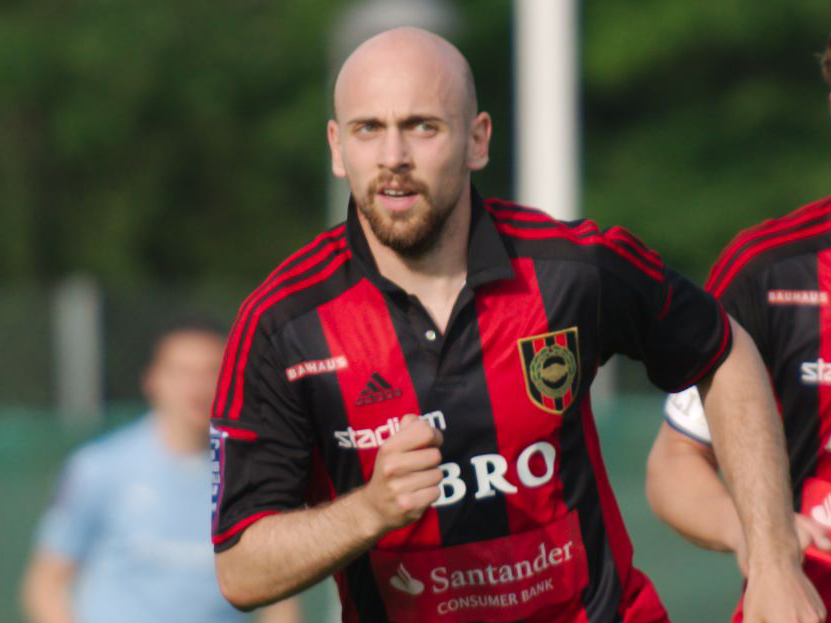

Personal information
- Full name: Kristinn Jónsson
- Date of birth: 4 August 1990 (age 36)
- Place of birth: Iceland
- Height: 1.74 m (5 ft 9 in)
- Position: Left back

Team information
- Current team: Breiðablik
- Number: 19

Senior career*
Years	Team	Apps	(Gls)
2007–2015	Breiðablik	132	(9)
2014	→ Brommapojkarna (loan)	22	(0)
2015–2017	Sarpsborg 08	9	(0)
2017	Sogndal	1	(0)
2017	Breiðablik	8	(0)
2018–2023	KR	120	(9)
2024-	Breiðablik	50	(4)

International career^{‡}
2006–2007	Iceland U-17	12	(0)
2007–2008	Iceland U-19	12	(1)
2010–2012	Iceland U-21	8	(0)
2009–	Iceland	8	(0)
- * Club domestic league appearances and goals as of 1 November 2026 ‡ National team caps and goals as of 16 February 2017

Kristinn Jónsson (born 4 August 1990) is an Icelandic football player, currently playing for Icelandic club Breiðablik.

== Breiðablik ==
Kristinn came through the youth ranks at Breiðablik, making his first appearance for the senior team in 2007, then at age 17. He won the Icelandic Cup with Breiðablik in 2009 and the national title in 2010. In 2015, Kristinn was voted the Úrvalsdeild player of the season by Icelandic national paper Morgunblaðið.

== Brommapojkarna (loan) ==
On 1 January 2014, Kristinn moved to Swedish Allsvenskan side Brommapojkarna on loan from Breiðablik.

== Sarpsborg ==
On 26 November 2015, Kristinn moved to Norwegian Tippeligaen club Sarpsborg 08.

== International career ==
At the age of 20 Kristinn had represented the Icelandic national team at all levels.
