= Höskuldur Gunnlaugsson =

Icelandic footballer

Personal information
- Full name: Höskuldur Gunnlaugsson
- Date of birth: 26 September 1994 (age 32)
- Place of birth: Iceland
- Height: 1.75 m (5 ft 9 in)
- Positions: Midfielder; right-back

Team information
- Current team: Breiðablik
- Number: 7

Youth career
- Breiðablik

Senior career*
Years	Team	Apps	(Gls)
2011–2017	Breiðablik	68	(11)
2012–2013	→ Augnablik (loan)	12	(9)
2017–2019	Halmstad	36	(5)
2019	→ Breiðablik (loan)	20	(7)
2020–	Breiðablik	160	(39)

International career^{‡}
2015–2016	Iceland U-21	7	(2)
2020–	Iceland	9	(0)
- * Club domestic league appearances and goals as of 1 November 2026 ‡ National team caps and goals as of 18 March 2026

Höskuldur Gunnlaugsson (born 26 September 1994) is an Icelandic football midfielder, who currently plays for Breiðablik and the Iceland national team.

== International career ==
Höskuldur has played for the Iceland U21 national team and the Iceland national football team. He did so in a friendly match against Canada, which ended with a 1–0 victory for the Icelandic team after a goal by Hólmar Eyjólfsson.
