= Leiknisvöllur =

Football stadium in Reykjavík, Iceland

(Iceland) Leiknisvöllur
- Interactive map of (Iceland) Leiknisvöllur
- Location: Breiðholt, Reykjavík, Iceland
- Coordinates: 64.1024017°N 21.8229433°W
- Capacity: 1,215 (525 seated)

Tenant
- Leiknir Reykjavík

Leiknisvöllur (Icelandic pronunciation: [ˈleiknɪsˌvœtlʏr̥], lit. 'Leiknir Field' or more precisely 'Leiknir Stadium') is a football stadium in Reykjavík, Iceland. It is currently used for football matches and is the home stadium of Leiknir Reykjavík. The stadium holds around 1215, with 525 being seated. The stadium is located in Breiðholt neighbourhood of Reykjavík.
