= Kópavogsvöllur =

Stadium in Kópavogur, Iceland

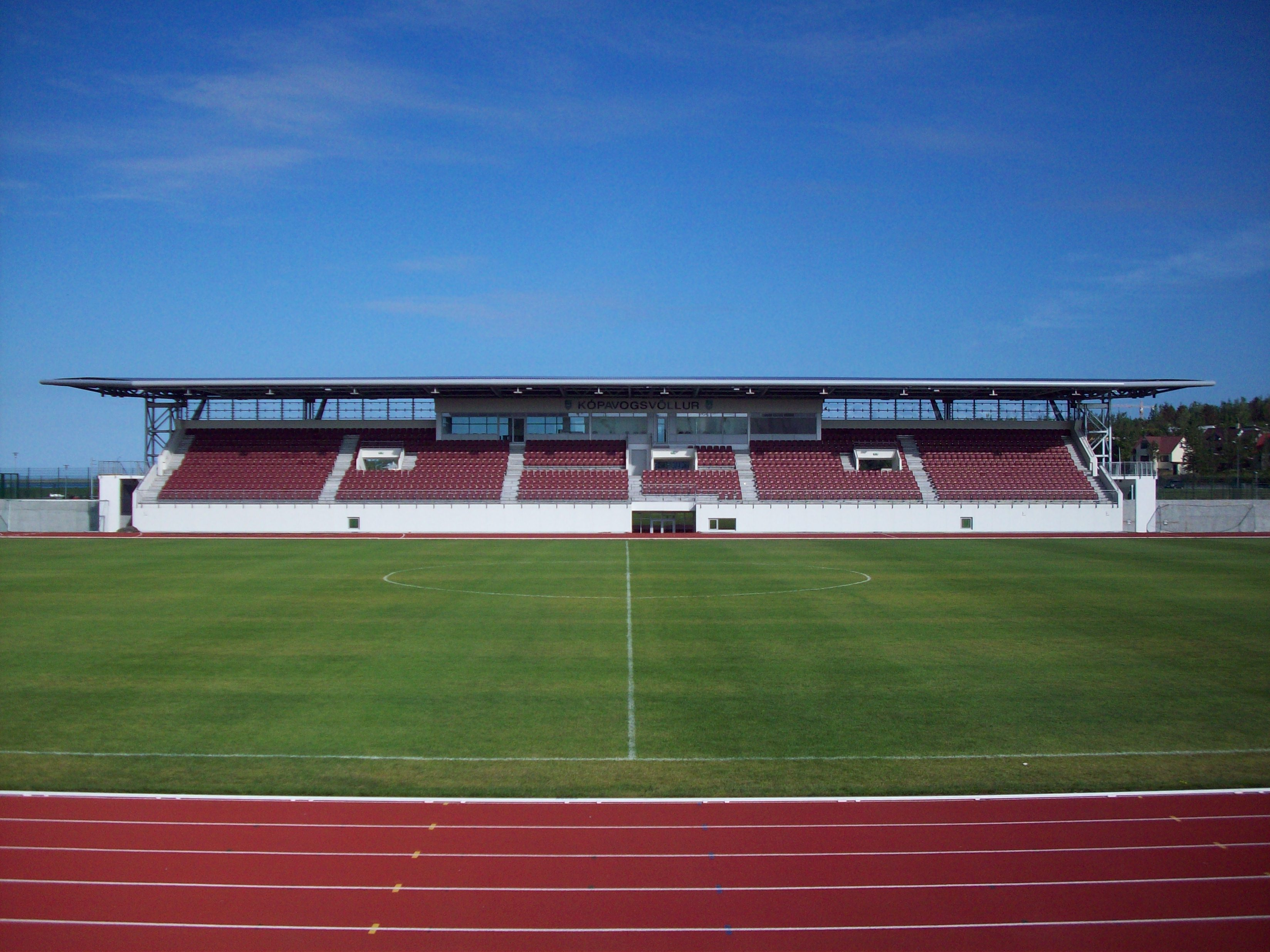
- Interactive map of Kópavogsvöllur
- Location: Dalsmári 5; 201 Kópavogur; Iceland
- Coordinates: 64°6′14″N 21°53′48″W
- Owner: Kópavogur
- Operator: Kópavogur
- Capacity: 3,009 (1,709 seated)
- Surface: Artificial turf
- Field size: 105 m × 68 m (344 ft × 223 ft)

Construction
- Groundbreaking: 1975
- Opened: 7 June 1975; 51 years ago
- Expanded: 9 May 2009

Tenants
- Breiðablik (1975–present); HK (1992–2013)

Kópavogsvöllur (Icelandic pronunciation: [ˈkʰouːpaˌvɔksˌvœtlʏr̥], lit. 'Kópavogur Field' or more precisely 'Kópavogur Stadium') is a multi-use stadium in Kópavogur, Iceland. It is currently used mostly for football matches and is the home stadium of Breiðablik. It is also used for track and field events. The stadium holds 3,009 spectators and has 1,709 seats in two stands.

The stadium was opened on 7 June 1975, when home team Breiðablik hosted Víkingur Ólafsvík in the old 2nd division.

On 9 May 2008, a new stand was opened by Þorgerður Katrín Gunnarsdóttir, Iceland's Minister of Education, Science and Culture. The new stand has 1,360 seats and is roofed. The stand also houses the changing rooms for the stadium, as well as lounges.

In 2019, the grass was replaced with artificial turf.
