= 2015 Valur season =

Valur
2015 season
- Manager: Ólafur Jóhannesson
- Stadium: Vodafonevöllurinn
- Úrvalsdeild: 5
- Borgunarbikarinn: Winners
- Lengjubikarinn: Quarter-finals
- Top goalscorer: League: Patrick Pedersen (13); All: Patrick Pedersen (24)
Home colours	Away colours

The 2015 season was Valur's 95th season in Úrvalsdeild and their 11th consecutive season in top-flight of Icelandic Football.

Along with the Úrvalsdeild, the club competed in the Lengjubikarinn and Borgunarbikarinn.

Ólafur Jóhannesson head coached the team after signing a 3-year contract following the departure of Magnús Gylfason on 6 October. He was by former Valur player Sigurbjörn Hreiðarsson. Ólafur and Sigurbjörn coached Haukar in the 2014 season.

On 15 August Valur won the Borgunarbikarinn after beating KR in the final 2–0.

Valur ended the season in 5th place in the league. Patrick Pedersen won the golden boot with 13 goals in 20 games.

== First team ==
As of 31 July 2015. These players competed in Úrvalsdeild, Borgunarbikarinn, Lengjubikarinn

Note: Flags indicate national team as defined under FIFA eligibility rules; some limited exceptions apply. Players may hold more than one non-FIFA nationality.

No.	Pos.	Nation	Player
1	GK	ISL	Ingvar Þór Kale
2	DF	DEN	Thomas Guldborg Christensen
3	MF	SCO	Iain James Williamson
4	MF	ISL	Einar Karl Ingvarsson
5	MF	ISL	Baldvin Sturluson
7	MF	ISL	Haukur Páll Sigurðsson (Captain)
8	FW	ISL	Kristinn Ingi Halldórsson
9	FW	DEN	Patrick Pedersen
10	MF	ISL	Kristinn Freyr Sigurðsson
11	FW	ISL	Sigurður Egill Lárusson
12	GK	ISL	Anton Ari Einarsson
13	DF	ISL	Darri Sigþórsson
14	DF	ISL	Gunnar Gunnarsson

No.	Pos.	Nation	Player
16	MF	ISL	Tómas Óli Garðarsson
17	MF	ISL	Andri Adolphsson
18	FW	ISL	Haukur Ásberg Hilmarsson
19	FW	ISL	Emil Atlason
20	DF	ISL	Orri Sigurður Ómarsson
21	DF	ISL	Bjarni Ólafur Eiríksson
22	MF	DEN	Mathias Schlie
23	MF	ISL	Andri Fannar Stefánsson
—	MF	ISL	Marteinn Högni Elíasson
—	MF	ISL	Páll Magnús Pálsson
—	MF	ISL	Jón Örn Gunnarsson
—	FW	ISL	Bjarki Steinar Björnsson

== Transfers and loans ==
=== Transfers In ===
Date	Position	No.	Player	From club	Other	Ref
16 October 2014	MF	23	(Iceland) Andri Fannar Stefánsson	(Iceland) Leiknir R	Back from Loan	
16 October 2014	MF	11	(Iceland) Arnar Sveinn Geirsson	(Iceland) KH	Back from Loan	
16 October 2014	MF	4	(Iceland) Einar Karl Ingvarsson	(Iceland) Grindavík	Back from Loan	
16 October 2014	DF	13	(The Gambia) Matarr Jobe	(Iceland) Víkingur Ó	Back from Loan	
16 October 2014	FW	29	(Iceland) Ragnar Þór Gunnarsson	(Iceland) Selfoss	Back from Loan	
6 November 2014	DF	5	(Iceland) Baldvin Sturluson	(Iceland) Stjarnan		
8 December 2014	GK	1	(Iceland) Ingvar Þór Kale	(Iceland) Víkingur R		
30 December 2014	DF	20	(Iceland) Orri Sigurður Ómarsson	(Denmark) AGF		
30 January 2015	MF	17	(Iceland) Andri Adolphsson	(Iceland) ÍA		
1 February 2015	MF	16	(Iceland) Tómas Óli Garðarsson	(Iceland) Breiðablik		
19 March 2015	MF		(Iceland) Hilmar Þór Hilmarsson	(Iceland) Stjarnan		
7 May 2015	DF	2	(Denmark) Thomas Guldborg Christensen	(Sweden) Hammarby IF		
21 July 2015	FW	19	(Iceland) Emil Atlason	(Iceland) KR	On loan	

=== Transfers Out ===
Date	Position	No.	Player	To club	Other	Ref
11 October 2014	FW	9	(Iceland) Kolbeinn Kárason	(Iceland) Leiknir R		
16 October 2014	DF	13	(The Gambia) Matarr Jobe	Released		
16 October 2014	GK	25	(Iceland) Ásgeir Þór Magnússon	Released		
5 November 2014	DF	2	(Sweden) Billy Berntsson	(Malta) Qormi F.C.		
5 November 2014	MF	20	(Uganda) Tonny Mawejje	(Norway) Haugesund	Was on Loan	
22 November 2014	MF	16	(Iceland) Halldór Hermann Jónsson	(Iceland) KA		
28 November 2014	MF	5	(Iceland) Magnús Már Lúðvíksson	(Iceland) Fram		
1 December 2014	GK	1	(Iceland) Fjalar Þorgeirsson	Retired		
23 March 2015	MF	11	(Iceland) Arnar Sveinn Geirsson	(Iceland) Víkingur Ó		
17 July 2015	DF	15	(Iceland) Þórður Steinar Hreiðarsson	(Iceland) Þór		

=== Loans in ===
Start Date	End Date	Position	No.	Player	From Club	Ref
27 July 2015	16 October 2015	MF	22	(Denmark) Mathias Schlie	(Denmark) Hobro IK	

=== Loans out ===
Start Date	End Date	Position	No.	Player	To Club	Ref
8 May 2015	16 October 2015	FW	29	(Iceland) Ragnar Þór Gunnarsson	(Iceland) Tindastóll	
13 May 2015	16 October 2015	MF		(Iceland) Hilmar Þór Hilmarsson	(Iceland) Grótta	
31 July 2015	16 October 2015	MF	6	(Iceland) Daði Bergsson	(Iceland) Leiknir R	

== Pre-season ==
=== Reykjavík Cup ===
Valur took part in the 2015 Reykjavík Cup, a pre-season tournament for clubs from Reykjavík.

The team played in group B along with Leiknir R, Víkingur R, ÍR and Þróttur R. Valur finished second in the group behind Leiknir R with 7 points, 2 wins, 1 draw and 1 defeat. Kristinn Freyr was the highest goalscorer in the group with 6 goals.

In the semi-final game against Fjölnir, Sigurður Egill scored the only goal to put Valur through to the finals.

On 9 February Valur won Leiknir R in the final 3–0. Sigurður Egill scored the first goal on the 8th minute and Kristinn Freyr doubled the scoring on the 27th minute from the penalty spot. On the 37th minute Sigurður Egill was sent off after getting his second yellow card for a dive. Valur held on and managed to score their third goal through Þórður Steinar following a corner.

Date	Round	Opponents	Stadium	Result F–A	Scorers
9 January 2015	Group stage	ÍR	Egilshöll	9–1	Sigurður Egill 6' Þórður Steinar 23' Gunnar G. 25' Haukur Páll 30' 34' Einar Karl 44' Kristinn Freyr 57' 76' Ragnar Þór 64'
15 January 2015	Group stage	Víkingur R	Egilshöll	4–0	Haukur Ásberg 7' Ragnar Þór 22' Gunnar G. 25' Kristinn Freyr 64'
25 January 2015	Group stage	Leiknir R	Egilshöll	2–3	Kristinn Freyr 7' 29'(p.)
30 January 2015	Group stage	Þróttur R	Egilshöll	2–2	Kristinn Freyr 45' Haukur Páll 56'
5 February 2015	Semi-finals	Fjölnir	Egilshöll	1–0	Sigurður Egill 33'
9 February 2015	Final	Leiknir R	Egilshöll	3–0	Sigurður Egill 8' Kristinn Freyr 27'(p.) Þórður Steinar 82'

== Lengjubikarinn ==
Valur were drawn in group 3 in the Icelandic league cup, Lengjubikarinn, along with ÍA, Stjarnan, Keflavík, Grindavík, Haukar, Fjarðabyggð and Þór.

Valur finished second in the group behind ÍA with 5 wins and 2 draws, 17 points. Patrick Pedersen was their highest goalscorer with 6 goals in 6 games.

On 16 April Valur lost to Breiðablik in the quarter-finals 5–1. Patrick Pedersen scored Valur's only goal from the spot on the 42nd minute to level the score 1–1. Breiðablik than took all control of the game and scored 4 more goals.

Date	Round	Opponents	Stadium	Result F–A	Scorers
13 February 2015	Group stage	Stjarnan	Egilshöll	1–1	Haukur Ásberg 49'
21 February 2015	Group stage	Grindavík	Egilshöll	3–2	Patrick Pedersen 72' Kristinn Freyr 83'(p.) Bjarni Ólafur 90'
4 March 2015	Group stage	Keflavík	Reykjaneshöllin	3–3	Haukur Páll 33' Andri Fannar 38' Andri A. 60'
12 March 2015	Group stage	ÍA	Egilshöll	3–1	Patrick Pedersen 26' 28' Kristinn Freyr 45'
21 March 2015	Group stage	Fjarðabyggð	Fjarðabyggðarhöllin	2–0	Orri Sigurður 51' Ragnar Þór 80'
28 March 2015	Group stage	Þór A	Egilshöll	3–2	Patrik Pedersen 1' Andri A. 6' Haukur Ásberg 46'
10 April 2015	Group stage	Haukar	Egilshöll	2–1	Patrick Pedersen 38' 52'
16 April 2015	Quarter-finals	Breiðablik	Fífan	1–5	Patrick Pedersen 42'(p.)

== Úrvalsdeild ==
=== League table ===
Pos	Team	Pld	W	D	L	GF	GA	GD	Pts	Qualification or relegation
3	KR	22	12	6	4	36	21	+15	42	Qualification for the Europa League first qualifying round
4	Stjarnan	22	9	6	7	32	24	+8	33	
5	Valur	22	9	6	7	38	31	+7	33	Qualification for the Europa League first qualifying round (Note: Valur qualified for the UEFA Europa League first qualifying round by winning the 2015 Icelandic Cup.)
6	Fjölnir	22	9	6	7	36	35	+1	33	
7	ÍA	22	7	8	7	31	31	0	29	

Source: KSÍ, Soccerway
Rules for classification: 1) Points; 2) Goal difference; 3) Goals scored; 4) Head-to-head points; 5) Head-to-head goal difference; 6) Head-to-head goals scored; 7) Head-to-head away goals scored; 8) Play-off (only for deciding champion); 9) Draw.

=== Matches ===
Win Draw Loss Upcoming fixture

3 May 2015 1	Valur	0–3	Leiknir R	Reykjavík
19:15 GMT	Bjarni Ólafur Eiríksson (yellow card) 21'; Sigurður Egill Lárusson (yellow card) 43'	Report	Kolbeinn Kárason 8' (yellow card) 28'; Sindri Björnsson 13'; Hilmar Árni Halldórsson 71'; Elvar Páll Sigurðsson (yellow card) 87'	Stadium: Vodafonevöllurinn; Attendance: 1824; Referee: Valgeir Valgeirsson

10 May 2015 2	Víkingur R	2–2	Valur	Reykjavík
19:15 GMT	Pape Mamadou Faye 72'; Agnar Darri Sverrisson 83' (yellow card) 88'; Alan Lowing (yellow card) 64'; Finnur Ólafsson (yellow card) 53'	Report	Kristinn Freyr Sigurðsson 19'; Patrick Pedersen 42'; Haukur Páll Sigurðsson (yellow card) 63'; Andri Fannar Stefánsson (yellow card) 71'; Bjarni Ólafur Eiríksson (yellow card) 86'; Thomas Guldborg Christensen (yellow card) 90+4'	Stadium: Víkingsvöllur; Referee: Garðar Örn Hinriksson

17 May 2015 3	Valur	2–0	FH	Reykjavík
19:15 GMT	Sigurður Egill Lárusson 59' 66' (yellow card) 85'; Baldvin Sturluson (yellow card) 16'	Report	Pétur Viðarsson (yellow card) 22'	Stadium: Vodafonevöllurinn; Attendance: 1343; Referee: Gunnar Jarl Jónsson

20 May 2015 4	Breiðablik	1–0	Valur	Kópavogur
19:15 GMT	Höskuldur Gunnlaugsson 81'	Report	Haukur Páll Sigurðsson (yellow card) 14'; Andri Fannar Stefánsson (yellow card) 71'	Stadium: Kópavogsvöllur; Attendance: 1246; Referee: Erlendur Eiríksson

25 May 2015 5	Valur	3–3	Fjölnir	Reykjavík
19:15 GMT	Bjarni Ólafur Eiríksson 10' (yellow card) 77'; Baldvin Sturluson 32'; Patrick Pedersen 34'	Report	Aron Sigurðarson 21'; Þórir Guðjónsson 28'; Emil Pálsson 43' (yellow card) 70'; Bergsveinn Ólafsson (yellow card) 91'	Stadium: Vodafonevöllurinn; Referee: Þorvaldur Árnason

31 May 2015 6	Fylkir	0–3	Valur	Reykjavík
19:15 GMT	Oddur Ingi Guðmundsson (yellow card) 57'	Report	Patrick Pedersen 42'; Kristinn Ingi Halldórsson 52'; Sigurður Egill Lárusson 59'	Stadium: Fylkisvöllur; Attendance: 1250; Referee: Vilhjálmur Alvar Þórarinsson

7 June 2015 7	Valur	3–0	KR	Reykjavík
19:15 GMT	Patrick Pedersen 6' (pen.) 52' (yellow card) 86'; Haukur Ásberg Hilmarsson 93'; Haukur Páll Sigurðsson (yellow card) 17'; Bjarni Ólafur Eiríksson (yellow card) 53'; Kristinn Freyr Sigurðsson (yellow card) 59'; Ingvar Þór Kale (yellow card) 73'	Report	Aron Bjarki Jósepsson (yellow card) 32'; Jacob Schoop (yellow card) 73'; Pálmi Rafn Pálmason (yellow card) 73'	Stadium: Vodafonevöllurinn; Attendance: 1621; Referee: Þóroddur Hjaltalín

14 May 2015 8	Keflavík	1–2	Valur	Keflavík
19:15 GMT	Hólmar Örn Rúnarsson 63'; Samuel Jimenez Hernandez (yellow card) 85'	Report	Patrick Pedersen 42' (pen.); Own goal 43'; Baldvin Sturluson (yellow card) 25'; Thomas Guldborg Christensen (yellow card) 75'	Stadium: Nettóvöllurinn; Attendance: 980; Referee: Gunnar Jarl Jónsson

21 June 2015 9	Valur	1–1	ÍBV	Reykjavík
17:00 GMT	Kristinn Freyr Sigurðsson 70'; Bjarni Ólafur Eiríksson (yellow card) 60'	Report	Jonathan Ricardo Glenn 39' (pen.); Hafsteinn Briem (yellow card) 3'; Mees Siers (yellow card) 78'; Jonathan Patrick Barden (yellow card) 84'	Stadium: Vodafonevöllurinn; Referee: Valdimar Pálsson

28 June 2015 10	Valur	4–2	ÍA	Reykjavík
19:15 GMT	Andri Fannar Stefánsson 21'; Patrick Pedersen 30' 41' (yellow card) 88'; Kristinn Ingi Halldórsson 82'; Einar Karl Ingvarsson (yellow card) 53'; Kristinn Freyr Sigurðsson (yellow card) 66'; Iain James Williamson (yellow card) 75'	Report	Jón Vilhelm Ákason 37' (yellow card) 58'; Arsenij Buinickij 65'	Stadium: Vodafonevöllurinn; Referee: Guðmundur Ársæll Guðmundsson

10 July 2015 11	Stjarnan	1–2	Valur	Garðabær
20:00 GMT	Halldór Orri Björnsson 21'; Ólafur Karl Finsen (yellow card) 49'	Report	Own goal 27'; Kristinn Freyr Sigurðsson 77'; Patrick Pedersen (yellow card) 73'	Stadium: Samsung-völlurinn; Attendance: 823; Referee: Þorvaldur Árnason

20 July 2015 12	Leiknir R	0–1	Valur	Reykjavík
20:00 GMT	Sindri Björnsson (yellow card) 66'; Brynjar Hlöðversson (yellow card) 79'	Report	Kristinn Ingi Halldórsson 22'; Einar Karl Ingvarsson (yellow card) 80'; Andri Fannar Stefánsson (yellow card) 83'; Patrick Pedersen (yellow card) 90'	Stadium: Leiknisvöllur; Attendance: 932; Referee: Erlendur Eiríksson

25 July 2015 13	Valur	0–1	Víkingur R	Reykjavík
16:30 GMT	Andri Fannar Stefánsson (yellow card) 61'; Sigurður Egill Lárusson (yellow card) 75'	Report	Ívar Örn Jónsson 75' (pen.) (yellow card) 84'; Arnþór Ingi Kristinsson (yellow card) 89'; Milos Zivkovic (yellow card) 95'	Stadium: Vodafonevöllurinn; Attendance: 1033; Referee: Valdimar Pálsson

5 August 2015 14	FH	2–1	Valur	Hafnarfjörður
19:15 GMT	Atli Viðar Björnsson 45+1'; Bjarni Þór Viðarsson 81'; Emil Pálsson (yellow card) 74'	Report	Sigurður Egill Lárusson 67'; Mathias Schlie (yellow card) 38'; Haukur Páll Sigurðsson (yellow card) 57'	Stadium: Kaplakrikavöllur; Attendance: 1907; Referee: Þóroddur Hjaltalín

10 August 2015 15	Valur	0–1	Breiðablik	Reykjavík
19:15 GMT	Haukur Páll Sigurðsson (yellow card) 32'; Thomas Guldborg Christensen (yellow card) 87'; Sigurður Egill Lárusson (yellow card) 90+5'	Report	Jonathan Glenn 38'; Arnór Sveinn Aðalsteinsson (yellow card) 34'; Oliver Sigurjónsson (yellow card) 53'; Atli Sigurjónsson (yellow card) 89'; Höskuldur Gunnlaugsson (yellow card) 90+2'	Stadium: Laugardalsvöllur; Referee: Vilhjálmur Alvar Þórarinsson

20 August 2015 16	Fjölnir	1–1	Valur	Reykjavík
18:00 GMT	Aron Sigurðarson 7'; Bergsveinn Ólafsson (yellow card) 17'	Report	Einar Karl Ingvarsson 89'; Thomas Guldborg Christensen (yellow card) 5'	Stadium: Fjölnisvöllur; Attendance: 1120; Referee: Guðmundur Ársæll Guðmundsson

24 August 2015 17	Valur	4–2	Fylkir	Reykjavík
18:00 GMT	Patrick Pedersen 8' 37' (pen.); Kristinn Ingi Halldórsson 53' (yellow card) 83'; Einar Karl Ingvarsson 65'	Report	Ásgeir Eyþórsson 55' 77'; Jóhannes Karl Guðjónsson (yellow card) 17'; Ragnar Bragi Sveinsson (yellow card) 84'	Stadium: Laugardalsvöllur; Attendance: 491; Referee: Iwan Griffith

30 August 2015 18	KR	2–2	Valur	Reykjavík
18:00 GMT	Own goal 32'; Almarr Ormarsson 90'; Aron Bjarki Jósepsson (yellow card) 60' (yellow card) 88' (red card); Gunnar Þór Gunnarsson (yellow card) 76'	Report	Kristinn Ingi Halldórsson 1' (yellow card) 90+3'; Sigurður Egill Lárusson 52'; Haukur Páll Sigurðsson (yellow card) 23'; Kristinn Freyr Sigurðsson (yellow card) 54'; Andri Fannar Stefánsson (yellow card) 79'	Stadium: Alvogenvöllurinn; Attendance: 1255; Referee: Garðar Örn Hinriksson

13 September 2015 19	Valur	3–2	Keflavík	Reykjavík
17:00 GMT	Patrick Pedersen 5' 53' (pen.) (yellow card) 90+2'; Emil Atlason 74'; Andri Fannar Stefánsson (yellow card) 14'; Mathias Schlie (yellow card) 23'; Gunnar Gunnarsson (yellow card) 75'	Report	Magnús Þórir Matthíasson 14' (pen.) (yellow card) 52'; Martin Hummervoll 20'; Frans Elvarsson (yellow card) 85'	Stadium: Laugardalsvöllur; Attendance: 454; Referee: Þorvaldur Árnason

20 September 2015 20	ÍBV	3–3	Valur	Vestmannaeyjar
16:00 GMT	Jose Enrique Seoane Vergara 16'; Gunnar Heiðar Þorvaldsson 80'; Ian David Jeffs 82'; Jonathan Patrick Barden (yellow card) 19'	Report	Patrick Pedersen 23'; Sigurður Egill Lárusson 55'; Kristinn Freyr Sigurðsson 60'; Emil Atlason (yellow card) 39'; Gunnar Gunnarsson (yellow card) 43'; Mathias Schlie (yellow card) 65'	Stadium: Hásteinsvöllur; Attendance: 684; Referee: Vilhjálmur Alvar Þórarinsson

26 September 2015 21	ÍA	1–0	Valur	Akranes
14:00 GMT	Arnar Már Guðjónsson 27'	Report	Andri Fannar Stefánsson (yellow card) 83'	Stadium: Norðurálsvöllurinn; Attendance: 430; Referee: Gunnar Jarl Jónsson

3 October 2015 22	Valur	1–2	Stjarnan	Reykjavík
14:00 GMT	Emil Atlason 71'; Sigurður Egill Lárusson (yellow card) 19'; Mathias Schlie (yellow card) 51'	Report	Jeppe Hansen 65'; Arnar Már Björgvinsson 67'; Pablo Punyed (yellow card) 53' (yellow card) 63' (red card)	Stadium: Vodafonevöllurinn; Attendance: 922; Referee: Vilhjálmur Alvar Þórarinsson

=== Results ===
Overall								Home						Away					
Pld	W	D	L	GF	GA	GD	Pts	W	D	L	GF	GA	GD	W	D	L	GF	GA	GD
22	9	6	7	38	31	+7	33	5	2	4	21	17	+4	4	4	3	17	14	+3

Last updated: 3 October 2015.
Source: KSÍ

=== Points breakdown ===
- Points at home: 17
- Points away from home: 16
- 6 Points: Fylkir, Keflavík
- 4 Points: KR
- 3 Points: Leiknir R, FH, ÍA, Stjarnan
- 2 Points: Fjölnir, ÍBV
- 1 Point: Víkingur R
- 0 Points: Breiðablik

== Borgunarbikarinn ==
Valur came into the Icelandic cup, Borgunarbikarinn, in the 32nd-finals and were drawn against Selfoss. Valur won the game comfortably 4–0, with a hat trick from Patrick Pedersen.

In the 16th-finals the team was drawn against Fjarðabyggð. Valur won the game 4–0.

In the quarter-finals Valur was drawn against Víkingur R. Valur won the game 2–1 with Iain Williamson scoring the winning goal in the 80th minute.

On 7 July Valur was drawn against KA in the semi-finals. Valur won the tie on penalties after the game had ended 1–1. Valur had controlled most of the game but only managed to score one goal, an equaliser through Orri Sigurður after Elfar Árni had put KA ahead on the 6th minute.

Valur became Borgunarbikarinn champions on 15 August after defeating KR 2–0 in the final. Bjarni Ólafur opened the scoring on the 72nd minute with a header following a corner and Kristinn Ingi secured the win on the 87th minute. This was Valur's 10th Cup win with the last one coming in 2005.

Win Draw Loss Upcoming fixture

3 June 2015 32nd-finals	Valur	4–0	Selfoss	Reykjavík
19:15 GMT	Patrick Pedersen 24' 65' 90'; Tómas Óli Garðarsson 92'; Gunnar Gunnarsson (yellow card) 51'	Report	Einar Ottó Antonsson (yellow card) 46'; Arnar Logi Sveinsson (yellow card) 85'	Stadium: Vodafonevöllurinn; Referee: Garðar Örn Hinriksson

18 June 2015 16th-finals	Fjarðabyggð	0–4	Valur	Fjarðabyggð
17:00 GMT		Report	Kristinn Freyr SIgurðsson 15'; Daði Bergsson 40'; Patrick Pedersen 51'; Haukur Ásberg Hilmarsson 92'	Stadium: Eskjuvöllur; Attendance: 80; Referee: Erlendur Eiríksson

5 July 2015 Quarter-finals	Víkingur R	1–2	Valur	Reykjavík
19:15 GMT	Andri Rúnar Bjarnason 34'; Arnþór Ingi Kristinsson (yellow card) 73'	Report	Own goal 47'; Iain Williamson 80'; Kristinn Ingi Halldórsson (yellow card) 76'	Stadium: Víkingsvöllur; Attendance: 769; Referee: Gunnar Jarl Jónsson

29 July 2015 Semi-finals	KA	1–1 (a.e.t.) (3–5 p)	Valur	Akureyri
18:00 GMT	Elfar Árni Aðalsteinsson 6' (pen.); Hrannar Björn Steingrímsson (yellow card) 3'	Report	Orri Sigurður Ómarsson 23'; Kristinn Freyr Sigurðsson (yellow card) 64'; Iain James Williamson (yellow card) 73'	Stadium: Akureyrarvöllur; Attendance: 1207; Referee: Vilhjálmur Alvar Þórarinsson
	Penalties
	Elfar Árni Aðalsteinsson (penalty scored); Ólafur Aron Pétursson (penalty scored); Josip Serdarusic (penalty missed); Davíð Rúnar Bjarnason (penalty scored)		(penalty scored) Kristinn Freyr Sigurðsson; (penalty scored) Patrick Pedersen; (penalty scored) Einar Karl Ingvarsson; (penalty scored) Mathias Schlie; (penalty scored) Emil Atlason

15 August 2015 Final	Valur	2–0	KR	Reykjavík
16:00 GMT	Bjarni Ólafur Eiríksson 72'; Kristinn Ingi Halldórsson 87'; Thomas Guldborg Christensen (yellow card) 7'; Haukur Páll Sigurðsson (yellow card) 76'; Andri Fannar Stefánsson (yellow card) 77'	Report	Skúli Jón Friðgeirsson (yellow card) 68'; Þorsteinn Már Ragnarsson (yellow card) 90+4'	Stadium: Laugardalsvöllur; Attendance: 5751; Referee: Erlendur Eiríksson

== Squad statistics ==
=== Goalscorers ===
Includes all competitive matches.

As of match played 3 October 2015

Rank	Pos.	No.	Player	Úrvalsdeild	Borgunarbikar	Lengjubikar	Total
1	FW	9	(Denmark) Patrick Pedersen	13	4	7	24
2	MF	10	(Iceland) Kristinn Freyr Sigurðsson	4	1	2	7
3	FW	8	(Iceland) Kristinn Ingi Halldórsson	5	1	0	6
4	FW	11	(Iceland) Sigurður Egill Lárusson	6	0	0	6
5	FW	18	(Iceland) Haukur Ásberg Hilmarsson	1	1	2	4
6	DF	21	(Iceland) Bjarni Ólafur Eiríksson	1	1	1	3
7	MF	17	(Iceland) Andri Adolphsson	0	0	2	2
8	MF	23	(Iceland) Andri Fannar Stefánsson	1	0	1	2
9	DF	20	(Iceland) Orri Sigurður Ómarsson	0	1	1	2
10	MF	4	(Iceland) Einar Karl Ingvarsson	2	0	0	2
11	FW	19	(Iceland) Emil Atlason	2	0	0	2
12	MF	7	(Iceland) Haukur Páll Sigurðsson	0	0	1	1
13	FW	29	(Iceland) Ragnar Þór Gunnarsson	0	0	1	1
14	DF	5	(Iceland) Baldvin Sturluson	1	0	0	1
15	MF	16	(Iceland) Tómas Óli Garðarsson	0	1	0	1
16	MF	6	(Iceland) Daði Bergsson	0	1	0	1
17	MF	3	(Scotland) Iain James Williamson	0	1	0	1

=== Appearances ===
Includes all competitive matches. Numbers in parentheses are sub appearances

As of match played 3 October 2015

No.	Pos.	Player	Úrvalsdeild	Borgunarbikar	Lengjubikar	Total
1	GK	(Iceland) Ingvar Þór Kale	19	4	5	28
2	DF	(Denmark) Thomas Guldborg Christensen	13	4	0	17
3	MF	(Scotland) Iain James Williamson	8 (8)	2 (2)	1 (1)	22
4	MF	(Iceland) Einar Karl Ingvarsson	7 (6)	1 (3)	7 (1)	25
5	DF	(Iceland) Baldvin Sturluson	11 (4)	2	2 (1)	20
6	MF	(Iceland) Daði Bergsson	1 (6)	(1)	3 (2)	13
7	MF	(Iceland) Haukur Páll Sigurðsson	17	4	5	26
8	FW	(Iceland) Kristinn Ingi Halldórsson	14 (2)	5	(2)	23
9	FW	(Denmark) Patrick Pedersen	19 (1)	5	7	32
10	MF	(Iceland) Kristinn Freyr Sigurðsson	20	5	5 (1)	31
11	FW	(Iceland) Sigurður Egill Lárusson	20	5	5 (2)	32
12	GK	(Iceland) Anton Ari Einarsson	3 (1)	1	3 (1)	9
13	DF	(Iceland) Darri Sigþórsson	0	0	0	0
14	DF	(Iceland) Gunnar Gunnarsson	8	1	4 (2)	15
15	DF	(Iceland) Þórður Steinar Hreiðarsson	1 (1)	0	7	9
16	MF	(Iceland) Tómas Óli Garðarsson	1 (9)	(2)	(1)	13
17	MF	(Iceland) Andri Adolphsson	6 (4)	(1)	7	18
18	FW	(Iceland) Haukur Ásberg Hilmarsson	(8)	(3)	4 (4)	19
19	FW	(Iceland) Emil Atlason	5 (3)	(1)	0	9
20	DF	(Iceland) Orri Sigurður Ómarsson	22	5	5	32
21	DF	(Iceland) Bjarni Ólafur Eiríksson	19	5	7	31
22	MF	(Denmark) Mathias Schlie	8	1 (1)	0	10
23	MF	(Iceland) Andri Fannar Stefánsson	19	5	8	32
29	FW	(Iceland) Ragnar Þór Gunnarsson	0	0	1 (5)	6
	MF	(Iceland) Marteinn Högni Elíasson	0	0	1 (1)	2
	MF	(Iceland) Hilmar Þór Hilmarsson	0	0	1	1
	MF	(Iceland) Páll Magnús Pálsson	0	0	(1)	1
	MF	(Iceland) Jón Örn Gunnarsson	0	0	(1)	1
	FW	(Iceland) Bjarki Steinar Björnsson	0	0	(1)	1

=== Disciplinary record ===
Includes all competitive matches.

As of match played 3 October 2015

No.	Pos.	Player	Úrvalsdeild			Borgunarbikar			Lengjubikar			Total		
No.	Pos.	Player	Yellow card	Second yellow card	Red card	Yellow card	Second yellow card	Red card	Yellow card	Second yellow card	Red card	Yellow card	Second yellow card	Red card
1	GK	(Iceland) Ingvar Þór Kale	1	0	0	0	0	0	1	0	0	2	0	0
2	DF	(Denmark) Thomas Guldborg Christensen	4	0	0	1	0	0	0	0	0	5	0	0
3	MF	(Scotland) Iain James Williamson	1	0	0	1	0	0	0	0	0	2	0	0
4	MF	(Iceland) Einar Karl Ingvarsson	2	0	0	0	0	0	0	0	0	2	0	0
5	DF	(Iceland) Baldvin Sturluson	2	0	0	0	0	0	1	0	0	3	0	0
7	MF	(Iceland) Haukur Páll Sigurðsson	6	0	0	1	0	0	1	0	0	8	0	0
8	FW	(Iceland) Kristinn Ingi Halldórsson	2	0	0	1	0	0	0	0	0	3	0	0
9	FW	(Denmark) Patrick Pedersen	5	0	0	0	0	0	3	0	0	8	0	0
10	MF	(Iceland) Kristinn Freyr Sigurðsson	3	0	0	1	0	0	2	0	1	6	0	1
11	FW	(Iceland) Sigurður Egill Lárusson	5	0	0	0	0	0	0	0	0	5	0	0
14	DF	(Iceland) Gunnar Gunnarsson	2	0	0	1	0	0	1	0	0	4	0	0
15	DF	(Iceland) Þórður Steinar Hreiðarsson	0	0	0	0	0	0	1	0	0	1	0	0
18	FW	(Iceland) Haukur Ásberg Hilmarsson	0	0	0	0	0	0	1	0	0	1	0	0
19	FW	(Iceland) Emil Atlason	1	0	0	0	0	0	0	0	0	1	0	0
20	DF	(Iceland) Orri Sigurður Ómarsson	0	0	0	0	0	0	2	0	0	2	0	0
21	DF	(Iceland) Bjarni Ólafur Eiríksson	6	0	0	0	0	0	0	0	0	6	0	0
22	MF	(Denmark) Mathias Schlie	4	0	0	0	0	0	0	0	0	4	0	0
23	MF	(Iceland) Andri Fannar Stefánsson	7	0	0	1	0	0	2	0	0	10	0	0
29	FW	(Iceland) Ragnar Þór Gunnarsson	0	0	0	0	0	0	1	0	0	1	0	0
