= 2020 Úrvalsdeild =

Úrvalsdeild karla (Pepsi-deildin)
- Season: 2020
- Dates: 13 June – 31 October 2020
- Champions: Valur
- Relegated: Grótta; Fjölnir
- Champions League: Valur
- Europa Conference League: FH; Stjarnan; Breiðablik
- Matches: 107
- Top goalscorer: Steven Lennon (17 goals)
- Biggest home win: Valur 6–0 Grótta (4 Oct 2020)
- Biggest away win: Víkingur Reykjavík 1–5 Valur (8 July 2020); Stjarnan 1–5 Valur (21 Sept 2020)
- Highest scoring: KR 4–5 Valur (26 August 2020)
- Longest winning run: 10 matches Valur
- Longest unbeaten run: 14 matches Valur
- Longest winless run: 18 matches Fjölnir
- Longest losing run: 4 matches Fjölnir

The 2020 Úrvalsdeild karla, also known as Pepsi-deild karla for sponsorship reasons, was the 109th season of top-flight Icelandic football. Twelve teams contested the league, including the defending champions KR, who won their 27th league title in 2019.

The season was scheduled to begin on 22 April 2020 and conclude on 26 September 2020, however this was delayed due to the COVID-19 pandemic. The competition was suspended on 7 October and abandoned on 30 October 2020. The standings based on the average number of points per matches played for each team were considered final and used to determine the champions, European spots and relegation.

== Teams ==
Locations of the 2020 Úrvalsdeild teams

The 2020 Úrvalsdeild is contested by twelve teams, ten of which played in the division the previous year and two teams promoted from 1. deild karla. The bottom two teams from the previous season, Grindavík and ÍBV, were relegated to the 2020 1. deild karla and were replaced by Grótta and Fjölnir, champions and runners-up of the 2019 1. deild karla respectively.

=== Club information ===
Team	Location	Stadium	Capacity
Breiðablik	Kópavogur	Kópavogsvöllur	3,009
FH	Hafnarfjörður	Kaplakriki	6,450
Fjölnir	Reykjavík (Grafarvogur)	Extra völlurinn	1,030
Fylkir	Reykjavík	Floridana völlurinn	1,854
Grótta	Seltjarnarnes	Vivaldivöllurinn	1,050
KA	Akureyri	Akureyrarvöllur	1,645
KR	Reykjavík	Alvogenvöllurinn	3,333
HK	Kópavogur	Kórinn	1,452
ÍA	Akranes	Norðurálsvöllurinn	3,054
Stjarnan	Garðabær	Samsung völlurinn	1,440
Valur	Reykjavík	Valsvöllur	2,465
Víkingur R.	Reykjavík	Víkingsvöllur	1,848

=== Personnel and kits ===
Team	Manager	Assistant Manager	Captain	Kit manufacturer	Shirt sponsor
Breiðablik	(Iceland) Óskar Hrafn Þorvaldsson	(Iceland) Halldór Árnason	(Iceland) Höskuldur Gunnlaugsson	(Italy) Errea	Vörður
FH	(Iceland) Logi Ólafsson (Iceland) Eiður Smári Guðjohnsen	(Iceland) Guðlaugur Baldursson	(Iceland) Björn Daníel Sverrisson	(United States) Nike	Actavis
Fjölnir	(Iceland) Ásmundur Arnarsson	(Iceland) Gunnar Már Guðmundsson	(Iceland) Hans Viktor Guðmundsson	(Denmark) Hummel	vita
Fylkir	(Iceland) Atli Sveinn Þórarinsson (Iceland) Ólafur Stígsson	(Iceland) Ólafur Ingi Skúlason	(Iceland) Ragnar Bragi Sveinsson	(Italy) Macron	Wurth; Eykt
Grótta	(Iceland) Ágúst Gylfason	(Iceland) Guðmundur Steinarsson	(Iceland) Sigurvin Reynisson	(Italy) Errea	Hyundai
HK	(Iceland) Brynjar Björn Gunnarsson	(Iceland) Viktor Bjarki Arnarsson	(Iceland) Leifur Andri Leifsson	(Italy) Macron	MótX
ÍA	(Iceland) Jóhannes Karl Guðjónsson	(Iceland) Arnar Snær Guðmundsson (Iceland) Ingimar Elí Hlynsson	(Iceland) Árni Snær Ólafsson	(Italy) Errea	Norðurál
KA	(Iceland) Arnar Grétarsson	(Iceland) Pétur Heiðar Kristjánsson (Iceland) Hallgrímur Jónasson	(Iceland) Almarr Ormarsson	(Italy) Errea	N1
KR	(Iceland) Rúnar Kristinsson	(Iceland) Bjarni Guðjónsson	(Iceland) Óskar Örn Hauksson	(United States) Nike	Alvogen
Stjarnan	(Iceland) Rúnar Páll Sigmundsson (Iceland) Ólafur Jóhannesson	None	(Iceland) Alex Þór Hauksson	(Germany) Uhlsport	Tryggingamiðstöðin
Valur	(Iceland) Heimir Guðjónsson	(Serbia) Srdjan Tufegdzic	(Iceland) Haukur Páll Sigurðsson	(Italy) Macron	Bose
Víkingur R.	(Iceland) Arnar Gunnlaugsson	(Bosnia and Herzegovina) Hajrudin Cardaklija (Iceland) Einar Guðnason	(Iceland) Sölvi Ottesen	(Italy) Macron	TVG-Zimsen

=== Managerial changes ===
Team	Outgoing manager	Manner of departure	Date of vacancy	Position in table	Incoming manager	Date of appointment
Valur	(Iceland) Ólafur Jóhannesson	End of contract	28 September 2019	Pre-season	(Iceland) Heimir Guðjónsson	2 October 2019
Fylkir	(Iceland) Helgi Sigurðsson	Resigned	28 September 2019	Pre-season	(Iceland) Atli Sveinn Þórarinsson & (Iceland) Ólafur Stígsson	15 October 2019
Breiðablik	(Iceland) Ágúst Gylfason	Sacked	28 September 2019	Pre-season	(Iceland) Óskar Hrafn Þorvaldsson	5 October 2019
Grótta	(Iceland) Óskar Hrafn Þorvaldsson	Left for Breiðablik	5 October 2019	Pre-season	(Iceland) Ágúst Gylfason	17 October 2019
Stjarnan	(Iceland) Rúnar Páll Sigmundsson	Co-manager hired	6 November 2019	Pre-season	(Iceland) Rúnar Páll Sigmundsson & (Iceland) Ólafur Jóhannesson	6 November 2019
KA	(Iceland) Óli Stefán Flóventsson	Sacked	15 July 2020	11th	(Iceland) Arnar Grétarsson	15 July 2020
FH	(Iceland) Ólafur Kristjánsson	Left for Esbjerg fB	16 July 2020	8th	(Iceland) Logi Ólafsson & (Iceland) Eiður Smári Guðjohnsen	16 July 2020

== League table ==
Pos	Team	Pld	W	D	L	GF	GA	GD	Pts	PPG	Qualification or relegation
1	Valur (C)	18	14	2	2	50	17	+33	44	2.44	Qualification for the Champions League first qualifying round
2	FH	18	11	3	4	37	23	+14	36	2.00	Qualification for the Europa Conference League first qualifying round
3	Stjarnan	17	8	7	2	27	20	+7	31	1.82	Qualification for the Europa Conference League first qualifying round
4	Breiðablik	18	9	4	5	37	27	+10	31	1.72	Qualification for the Europa Conference League first qualifying round
5	KR	17	8	4	5	30	21	+9	28	1.65	
6	Fylkir	18	9	1	8	27	30	−3	28	1.56	Closure working
7	KA	18	3	12	3	20	21	−1	21	1.17	
8	ÍA	18	6	3	9	39	43	−4	21	1.17	
9	HK	18	5	5	8	29	36	−7	20	1.11	
10	Víkingur Reykjavík	18	3	8	7	25	30	−5	17	0.94	
11	Grótta (R)	18	1	5	12	15	43	−28	8	0.44	Relegation to 1. deild karla
12	Fjölnir (R)	18	0	6	12	15	40	−25	6	0.33	Relegation to 1. deild karla

Source: KSÍ (in Icelandic), Soccerway
Rules for classification: 1) Points per game; 2) Goal difference; 3) Goals scored; 4) Head-to-head points; 5) Head-to-head goal difference; 6) Head-to-head goals scored; 7) Head-to-head away goals scored; 8) Play-off (only for deciding champion); 9) Draw.
(C) Champions; (R) Relegated

== Results ==
Each team was originally scheduled to play home and away once against every other team for a total of 22 games each.

Home \ Away	BRE	FH	FJO	FYL	GRÓ	HK	ÍA	KA	KR	STJ	VAL	VIK
Breiðablik	—	3–3	3–1	4–1	3–0	—	5–3	1–1	0–2	2–1	1–2	—
FH	3–1	—	1–0	1–2	2–1	4–0	2–1	0–0	—	1–2	1–4	1–0
Fjölnir	1–4	0–3	—	1–2	0–3	—	1–3	1–1	—	1–4	1–3	1–1
Fylkir	0–1	1–4	2–0	—	2–0	3–2	—	4–1	0–3	1–1	—	2–1
Grótta	0–1	—	2–2	0–2	—	4–4	0–4	2–4	—	—	0–3	1–1
HK	1–0	2–3	3–1	—	3–0	—	3–2	—	1–1	2–3	0–4	0–2
ÍA	—	0–4	—	3–2	3–0	2–2	—	3–1	1–2	1–2	2–4	2–2
KA	2–2	—	1–1	2–0	1–0	1–1	2–2	—	0–0	0–0	—	0–0
KR	3–1	1–2	2–2	1–2	1–1	0–3	4–1	—	—	1–2	4–5	2–0
Stjarnan	—	1–1	1–0	2–1	1–1	4–1	—	1–1	—	—	1–5	1–1
Valur	1–1	—	—	3–0	6–0	1–0	1–4	1–0	0–1	0–0	—	2–0
Víkingur Reykjavík	2–4	4–1	1–1	—	—	1–1	6–2	2–2	0–2	—	1–5	—

Source: KSÍ (in Icelandic)
Legend: Blue = home team win; Yellow = draw; Red = away team win.

== Top goalscorers ==
Rank	Player	Club	Goals
1	(Scotland) Steven Lennon	FH	17
2	(Denmark) Patrick Pedersen	Valur	14
3	(Denmark) Thomas Mikkelsen	Breiðablik	13
4	(Iceland) Tryggvi Hrafn Haraldsson	ÍA	12
5	(Iceland) Óttar Magnús Karlsson	Víkingur Reykjavik	9
6	(Iceland) Valdimar Þór Ingimundarson	Fylkir	8
6	(Iceland) Stefán Teitur Þórðarson	ÍA	8
8	(Iceland) Aron Bjarnason	Valur	7
8	(Iceland) Hilmar Árni Halldórsson	Stjarnan	7
8	(Iceland) Sigurður Egill Lárusson	Valur	7
8	(El Salvador) Pablo Punyed	Víkingur Reykjavík	7
