= 2019 Úrvalsdeild =

Úrvalsdeild karla (Pepsi max-deildin)
- Season: 2019
- Dates: April – September 2019
- Champions: KR
- Relegated: Grindavík; ÍBV
- Champions League: KR
- Europa League: Breiðablik; FH; Víkingur R.
- Matches: 132
- Goals: 412 (3.12 per match)
- Top goalscorer: Gary Martin (14 goals)
- Best goalkeeper: Beitir Ólafsson
- Biggest home win: Valur 5–1 ÍBV (15 June 2019); Stjarnan 5–1 Fylkir (23 June 2019); Breiðablik 4–0 KA (7 August 2019)
- Biggest away win: ÍA 1-5 Víkingur R. (28 September 2019)
- Highest scoring: FH 6-4 ÍBV (18 September 2019)

The 2019 Úrvalsdeild karla, also known as Pepsi Max-deild karla for sponsorship reasons, was the 108th season of top-flight Icelandic football. Twelve teams contested the league, including the defending champions Valur, who won their 21st league title in 2018.

The season began in April 2019 and concluded on 28 September 2019.

== Teams ==
Locations of the 2019 Úrvalsdeild teams

The 2019 Úrvalsdeild is contested by twelve teams, ten of which played in the division the previous year and two teams promoted from 1. deild karla. The bottom two teams from the previous season, Fjölnir and Keflavík, were relegated to the 2019 1. deild karla and were replaced by ÍA and HK, champions and runners-up of the 2018 1. deild karla respectively.

=== Club information ===
Team	Location	Stadium	Capacity
Breiðablik	Kópavogur	Kópavogsvöllur	3,009
FH	Hafnarfjörður	Kaplakriki	6,450
Fylkir	Reykjavík	Floridana völlurinn	1,854
Grindavík	Grindavík	Grindavíkurvöllur	1,750
ÍBV	Vestmannaeyjar	Hásteinsvöllur	3,034
KA	Akureyri	Akureyrarvöllur	1,645
KR	Reykjavík	Alvogenvöllurinn	3,333
HK	Kópavogur	Kórinn	1,452
ÍA	Akranes	Norðurálsvöllurinn	3,054
Stjarnan	Garðabær	Samsung völlurinn	1,440
Valur	Reykjavík	Valsvöllur	2,465
Víkingur R.	Reykjavík	Víkingsvöllur	1,848

=== Personnel and kits ===
Team	Manager	Captain	Kit manufacturer	Shirt sponsor
Breiðablik	(Iceland) Ágúst Gylfason	(Iceland) Gunnleifur Gunnleifsson	Jako	Vörður
FH	(Iceland) Ólafur Kristjánsson	(Iceland) Davíð Viðarsson	Adidas	Actavis
Grindavík	(Serbia) Srdjan Tufegdzic	(Iceland) Gunnar Þorsteinsson	Stanno	LÝSI
Fylkir	(Iceland) Helgi Sigurðsson	(Iceland) Ásgeir Börkur Ásgeirsson	Jako	Wurth
HK	(Iceland) Brynjar Gunnarsson	(Iceland) Leifur Andri Leifsson	macron	N1
ÍA	(Iceland) Joey Guðjónsson	(Iceland) Arnar Már Guðjónsson	Erreà	Norðurál
ÍBV	(England) Ian Jeffs	(Iceland) Sindri Snær Magnússon	Hummel	Bónus
KA	(Iceland) Óli Stefán Flóventsson	(Iceland) Guðmann Þórisson	Diadora	N1
KR	(Iceland) Rúnar Kristinsson	(Iceland) Pálmi Rafn Pálmason	Nike	Alvogen
Stjarnan	(Iceland) Rúnar Páll Sigmundsson	(Iceland) Baldur Sigurðsson	Uhlsport	Orkan
Valur	(Iceland) Ólafur Jóhannesson	(Iceland) Haukur Páll Sigurðsson	Macron	Munck
Víkingur R.	(Iceland) Arnar Gunnlaugsson	(Iceland) Sölvi Ottesen	Macron	TVG-Zimsen

=== Managerial changes ===
Team	Outgoing manager	Manner of departure	Date of vacancy	Position in table	Incoming manager	Date of appointment
Grindavík	(Iceland) Óli Stefán Flóventsson	Resigned	3 September 2018	Pre-season	(Serbia) Srdjan Tufegdzic	6 October 2018
KA	(Serbia) Srdjan Tufegdzic	Resigned	13 September 2018	Pre-season	(Iceland) Óli Stefán Flóventsson	1 October 2018
ÍBV	(Iceland) Kristján Guðmundsson	Resigned	26 September 2018	Pre-season	(Portugal) Pedro Hipólito	29 September 2018
Víkingur R.	(Iceland) Logi Ólafsson	Resigned	3 October 2018	Pre-season	(Iceland) Arnar Gunnlaugsson	6 October 2018
ÍBV	(Portugal) Pedro Hipólito	Resigned	30 June 2019	12th	(England) Ian Jeffs	11 July 2019

== League table ==
Pos	Team	Pld	W	D	L	GF	GA	GD	Pts	Qualification or relegation
1	KR (C)	22	16	4	2	44	23	+21	52	Qualification for the Champions League first qualifying round
2	Breiðablik	22	11	5	6	45	31	+14	38	Qualification for the Europa League first qualifying round
3	FH	22	11	4	7	40	36	+4	37	Qualification for the Europa League first qualifying round
4	Stjarnan	22	9	8	5	40	34	+6	35	
5	KA	22	9	4	9	34	34	0	31	
6	Valur	22	8	5	9	38	34	+4	29	
7	Víkingur	22	7	7	8	37	35	+2	28	Qualification for the Europa League first qualifying round (Note: Víkingur qualified for the Europa League first qualifying round by winning the 2019 Icelandic Cup.)
8	Fylkir	22	8	4	10	38	44	−6	28	
9	HK	22	7	6	9	29	29	0	27	
10	ÍA	22	7	6	9	27	32	−5	27	
11	Grindavík (R)	22	3	11	8	17	28	−11	20	Relegation to 1. deild karla
12	ÍBV (R)	22	2	4	16	23	52	−29	10	Relegation to 1. deild karla

Source: KSÍ (in Icelandic), Soccerway
Rules for classification: 1) Points; 2) Goal difference; 3) Goals scored; 4) Head-to-head points; 5) Head-to-head goal difference; 6) Head-to-head goals scored; 7) Head-to-head away goals scored; 8) Play-off (only for deciding champion); 9) Draw.
(C) Champions; (R) Relegated

== Results ==
Each team played home and away once against every other team for a total of 22 games each.

Home \ Away	BRE	FH	FYL	GRI	HK	ÍA	ÍBV	KA	KR	STJ	VAL	VIK
Breiðablik	—	4–1	4–3	0–0	1–2	0–1	3–1	4–0	1–2	1–1	3–3	3–1
FH	2–4	—	2–1	3–0	2–0	1–0	6–4	3–2	1–2	2–2	3–2	1–0
Fylkir	4–3	2–2	—	2–1	3–2	2–2	3–0	3–2	1–4	1–4	0–1	3–1
Grindavík	0–2	0–0	1–0	—	1–1	1–1	2–1	0–2	2–1	1–1	2–2	0–0
HK	2–2	2–0	1–2	0–0	—	1–1	2–0	2–1	4–1	1–1	1–2	1–3
ÍA	1–2	2–0	2–0	1–1	0–2	—	2–1	3–1	1–3	2–0	1–2	1–5
ÍBV	1–1	1–2	0–3	2–2	0–1	3–2	—	1–1	1–2	0–2	2–1	1–1
KA	0–1	1–0	4–2	2–1	1–1	1–1	2–0	—	0–0	4–2	1–0	3–4
KR	2–0	3–2	1–1	5–2	3–2	2–0	3–0	1–0	—	2–2	3–2	1–0
Stjarnan	1–3	1–3	5–1	0–0	1–0	3–1	3–2	0–2	1–1	—	2–1	2–1
Valur	0–1	2–3	1–0	1–0	2–0	1–2	5–1	3–1	0–1	2–2	—	3–3
Víkingur R.	3–2	1–1	1–1	1–0	2–1	0–0	3–1	2–3	0–1	3–4	2–2	—

Source: (in Icelandic)
Legend: Blue = home team win; Yellow = draw; Red = away team win.

=== Positions by round ===
Team ╲ Round	1	2	3	4	5	6	7	8	9	10	11	12	13	14	15	16	17	18	19	20	21	22
KR	7	2	5	6	4	3	3	1	1	1	1	1	1	1	1	1	1	1	1	1	1	1
Breiðablik	3	4	1	2	2	2	1	2	2	2	2	2	2	2	2	2	2	2	2	2	2	2
FH	3	5	3	4	3	4	4	6	4	5	6	5	6	7	6	3	3	4	3	3	3	3
Stjarnan	7	8	6	3	5	7	5	7	7	4	3	4	4	4	3	5	4	3	4	4	4	4
KA	9	6	7	10	7	5	8	5	6	7	9	11	11	11	11	10	9	10	10	10	5	5
Valur	5	9	10	8	9	10	12	9	11	11	7	6	7	5	4	6	6	5	5	8	9	6
Víkingur	5	7	8	11	11	11	11	10	9	9	8	10	10	10	10	9	10	9	7	9	10	7
Fylkir	1	1	4	5	8	8	7	4	5	6	5	7	5	6	8	8	8	8	9	5	6	8
HK	10	10	11	9	10	9	9	11	10	8	11	8	8	8	7	4	5	6	6	6	7	9
ÍA	2	3	2	1	1	1	2	3	3	3	4	3	3	3	5	7	7	7	8	7	8	10
Grindavík	10	11	9	7	6	6	6	8	8	10	10	9	9	9	9	11	11	11	11	11	11	11
ÍBV	12	12	12	12	12	12	10	12	12	12	12	12	12	12	12	12	12	12	12	12	12	12

Leader
2020–21 UEFA Europa League first qualifying round
Relegation to 1. deild karla

Source: ksi.is

== Top goalscorers ==
Rank	Player	Club	Goals
1	(England) Gary Martin	Valur/ÍBV	14
2	(Scotland) Steven Lennon	FH	13
2	(Denmark) Thomas Mikkelsen	Breiðablik	13
2	(Iceland) Elfar Árni Aðalsteinsson	KA	13
2	(Iceland) Hilmar Árni Halldórsson	Stjarnan	13
6	(Netherlands) Geoffrey Castillion	Fylkir	10
6	(Iceland) Hallgrímur Mar Steingrímsson	KA	10
8	(Denmark) Patrick Pedersen	Valur	8
8	(Iceland) Pálmi Rafn Pálmason	KR	8
8	(Denmark) Morten Beck Guldsmed	FH	8

== Attendances ==
#	Club	Average
1	KR	1,623
2	Breiðablik	1,318
3	FH	1,206
4	Fylkir	1,141
5	Valur	1,110
6	ÍA	1,057
7	Stjarnan	1,026
8	Víkingur	982
9	HK	874
10	KA	819
11	Grindavík	579
12	ÍBV	479
