= 2018 Úrvalsdeild =

Úrvalsdeild karla (Pepsi-deildin)
- Season: 2018
- Dates: 27 April – 29 September 2018
- Champions: Valur
- Relegated: Fjölnir; Keflavík
- Matches: 132
- Goals: 361 (2.73 per match)
- Top goalscorer: 17 goals Patrick Pedersen, Valur
- All statistics correct as of 29 September 2018.

The 2018 Úrvalsdeild karla, also known as Pepsi-deild karla for sponsorship reasons, was the 107th season of top-flight Icelandic football. Twelve teams contested the league, including the defending champions Valur, who won their 21st league title in 2017.

The season began on 27 April 2018 and concluded on 29 September 2018.

== Teams ==
Locations of the 2018 Úrvalsdeild teams

The 2018 Úrvalsdeild was contested by twelve teams, ten of which played in the division the previous year and two teams promoted from 1. deild karla. The bottom two teams from the previous season, Víkingur Ó. and ÍA, were relegated to the 2018 1. deild karla and were replaced by Fylkir and Keflavík, champions and runners-up of the 2017 1. deild karla respectively.

=== Club information ===
Team	Location	Stadium	Capacity
Breiðablik	Kópavogur	Kópavogsvöllur	5,501
FH	Hafnarfjörður	Kaplakriki	6,738
Fjölnir	Reykjavík (Grafarvogur)	Extra völlurinn	2,000
Fylkir	Reykjavík (Árbær)	Floridana völlurinn	5,000
Grindavík	Grindavík	Grindavíkurvöllur	1,750
ÍBV	Vestmannaeyjar	Hásteinsvöllur	3,034
KA	Akureyri	Akureyrarvöllur	1,770
Keflavík	Reykjanesbær (Keflavík)	Keflavíkurvöllur	5,200
KR	Reykjavík (Vesturbær)	Alvogenvöllurinn	3,333
Stjarnan	Garðabær	Samsung völlurinn	2,300
Valur	Reykjavík (Hlíðar/Miðborg)	Valsvöllur	2,465
Víkingur R.	Reykjavík (Fossvogur)	Víkingsvöllur	1,613

Source: Keflavík ÍF: Fixtures, Squad & Results

=== Personnel and kits ===
Team	Manager	Captain	Kit manufacturer	Shirt sponsor
Breiðablik	(Iceland) Ágúst Gylfason	(Iceland) Gunnleifur Gunnleifsson	Jako	Vörður
FH	(Iceland) Ólafur Kristjánsson	(Iceland) Davíð Þór Viðarsson	Adidas	Actavis
Fjölnir	(Iceland) Ólafur Páll Snorrason	(Iceland) Þórður Ingason	Hummel	Bónus
Grindavík	(Iceland) Páll Kristjánsson	(Iceland) Gunnar Þorsteinsson	Stanno	LÝSI
Fylkir	(Iceland) Helgi Sigurðsson	(Iceland) Ásgeir Börkur Ásgeirsson	Jako	Wurth
ÍBV	(Iceland) Kristján Guðmundsson	(Iceland) Sindri Snær Magnússon	Hummel	Bónus
KA	(Serbia) Srdjan Tufegdzic	(Iceland) Guðmann Þórisson	Diadora	N1
Keflavík	(Iceland) Guðlaugur Baldursson	(Scotland) Marc McAusland	Nike	Landsbankinn
KR	(Iceland) Rúnar Kristinsson	(Iceland) Pálmi Rafn Pálmason	Nike	Alvogen
Stjarnan	(Iceland) Rúnar Páll Sigmundsson	(Iceland) Baldur Sigurðsson	Uhlsport	Orkan
Valur	(Iceland) Ólafur Jóhannesson	(Iceland) Haukur Páll Sigurðsson	Macron	Munck
Víkingur R.	(Iceland) Logi Ólafsson	(Iceland) Sölvi Ottesen	Macron	TVG-Zimsen

=== Managerial changes ===
Team	Outgoing manager	Manner of departure	Date of vacancy	Position in table	Incoming manager	Date of appointment
Breiðablik	(Serbia) Miloš Milojević	Resigned	3 October 2017	Pre-season	(Iceland) Ágúst Gylfason	6 October 2017
Fjölnir	(Iceland) Ágúst Gylfason	Resigned	6 October 2017	Pre-season	(Iceland) Ólafur Páll Snorrason	11 October 2017
FH	(Iceland) Heimir Guðjónsson	Sacked	6 October 2017	Pre-season	(Iceland) Ólafur Kristjánsson	14 October 2017

== League table ==
Pos	Team	Pld	W	D	L	GF	GA	GD	Pts	Qualification or relegation
1	Valur (C)	22	13	7	2	50	24	+26	46	Qualification for the Champions League first qualifying round
2	Breiðablik	22	13	5	4	39	17	+22	44	Qualification for the Europa League first qualifying round (Note: Since the winners of 2018 Icelandic Cup, Stjarnan, qualified for European competition based on their league position, the spot awarded to the Cup winner (Europa League first qualifying round) was passed to the next best-placed team (the fourth-placed team).)
3	Stjarnan	22	11	7	4	45	26	+19	40	Qualification for the Europa League first qualifying round
4	KR	22	10	7	5	36	25	+11	37	Qualification for the Europa League first qualifying round
5	FH	22	10	7	5	36	28	+8	37	
6	ÍBV	22	8	5	9	29	31	−2	29	
7	KA	22	7	7	8	36	34	+2	28	
8	Fylkir	22	7	5	10	31	37	−6	26	
9	Víkingur R.	22	6	7	9	29	38	−9	25	
10	Grindavík	22	7	4	11	26	37	−11	25	
11	Fjölnir (R)	22	4	7	11	22	44	−22	19	Relegation to 1. deild karla
12	Keflavík (R)	22	0	4	18	11	49	−38	4	Relegation to 1. deild karla

Source: KSÍ (in Icelandic), Soccerway
Rules for classification: 1) Points; 2) Goal difference; 3) Goals scored; 4) Head-to-head points; 5) Head-to-head goal difference; 6) Head-to-head goals scored; 7) Head-to-head away goals scored; 8) Play-off (only for deciding champion); 9) Draw.
(C) Champions; (R) Relegated

=== Positions by round ===
Team ╲ Round	1	2	3	4	5	6	7	8	9	10	11	12	13	14	15	16	17	18	19	20	21	22
Valur	2	2	3	5	7	6	2	1	1	1	1	2	1	1	2	2	1	1	1	1	1	1
Breiðablik	1	1	1	1	1	1	4	2	2	2	3	3	3	3	1	1	2	3	3	3	3	2
Stjarnan	5	9	9	10	5	8	5	4	4	3	2	1	2	2	3	3	3	2	2	2	2	3
KR	9	5	7	7	8	4	6	7	6	5	5	6	4	4	4	4	4	4	4	4	4	4
FH	3	7	2	2	3	3	3	5	5	6	6	4	6	5	5	5	5	5	5	5	5	5
ÍBV	12	12	12	12	12	11	9	11	11	11	10	9	9	9	9	8	8	8	8	8	8	6
KA	5	10	5	9	10	10	8	10	10	8	8	8	7	7	7	7	7	7	7	6	6	7
Fylkir	10	6	8	4	4	7	10	6	7	9	11	11	11	11	10	11	11	10	9	10	10	8
Víkingur R.	3	3	3	8	9	9	11	8	8	7	7	5	8	8	8	9	9	9	10	9	9	9
Grindavík	10	4	6	3	2	2	1	3	3	4	4	7	5	6	6	6	6	6	6	7	7	10
Fjölnir	5	8	10	6	6	5	7	9	9	10	9	10	10	10	11	10	10	11	11	11	11	11
Keflavík	5	11	11	11	11	12	12	12	12	12	12	12	12	12	12	12	12	12	12	12	12	12

Leader
2019–20 UEFA Europa League first qualifying round
Relegation to 1. deild karla

Source: KSÍ

== Results ==
Each team will play home and away once against every other team for a total of 22 games each.

Home \ Away	BRE	FH	FJÖ	FYL	GRI	ÍBV	KA	KEF	KR	STJ	VAL	VIK
Breiðablik	—	4–1	2–1	2–0	1–1	4–1	4–0	1–0	1–0	0–1	1–3	0–0
FH	1–3	—	1–0	1–1	2–1	0–2	3–1	2–2	4–0	2–3	2–1	3–0
Fjölnir	0–2	2–3	—	2–1	0–1	1–1	2–2	0–0	1–1	1–3	0–2	2–2
Fylkir	0–3	1–1	7–0	—	3–1	2–1	2–1	2–0	2–5	0–2	0–0	2–3
Grindavík	0–2	0–1	0–1	2–1	—	2–5	1–2	3–0	1–1	2–2	2–1	2–1
ÍBV	0–0	0–0	1–1	0–1	3–0	—	2–1	1–0	2–0	2–1	0–1	1–1
KA	0–0	1–1	2–0	5–1	4–3	2–0	—	0–0	0–1	1–2	3–3	4–1
Keflavík	1–2	1–3	1–2	1–2	0–2	1–3	0–3	—	0–4	0–2	0–2	0–4
KR	1–1	2–2	0–0	1–1	1–0	4–1	2–0	3–1	—	1–0	1–1	0–1
Stjarnan	2–1	0–1	6–1	3–0	1–1	2–1	1–1	2–2	2–3	—	1–1	3–3
Valur	2–1	2–1	5–3	2–2	4–0	5–1	3–1	4–1	2–1	2–2	—	4–1
Víkingur R.	2–3	1–1	1–2	1–0	0–1	2–1	2–2	1–0	2–3	0–4	0–0	—

Source: KSÍ (Football Association of Iceland) (in Icelandic)
Legend: Blue = home team win; Yellow = draw; Red = away team win.

== Top goalscorers ==
As of matches played on 29 September 2018

Rank	Player	Club	Goals
1	(Denmark) Patrick Pedersen	Valur	17
2	(Iceland) Hilmar Árni Halldórsson	Stjarnan	16
3	(Iceland) Pálmi Rafn Pálmason	KR	11
4	(Iceland) Ásgeir Sigurgeirsson	KA	10
4	(Denmark) Thomas Mikkelsen	Breiðablik	10
6	(Scotland) Steven Lennon	FH	9
7	(Iceland) Gunnar Heiðar Þorvaldsson	ÍBV	8
8	(Denmark) Kennie Chopart	KR	7
8	(Iceland) Gísli Eyjólfsson	Breiðablik	7
8	(Iceland) Guðmundur Steinn Hafsteinsson	Stjarnan	7
8	(Faroe Islands) Brandur Olsen	FH	7
12	(Netherlands) Geoffrey Castillion	Vikingur	6
12	(Denmark) Nikolaj Hansen	Vikingur	6
12	(Iceland) Kristinn Freyr Sigurðsson	Valur	6
15	(Iceland) Elfar Árni Aðalsteinsson	KA	5

== Attendances ==
#	Club	Average
1	Breiðablik	1,249
2	Valur	1,207
3	FH	1,069
4	Stjarnan	1,026
5	KR	977
6	Fylkir	848
7	Víkingur	827
8	Fjölnir	796
9	KA	691
10	ÍBV	598
11	Keflavík	531
12	Grindavík	523
