= Rasmus Christiansen (footballer, born 1989) =

Danish footballer

Personal information
- Full name: Rasmus Steenberg Christiansen
- Date of birth: 6 October 1989 (age 37)
- Place of birth: Gilleleje, Denmark
- Position: Centre-back

Team information
- Current team: Grótta
- Number: 26

Youth career
- Gilleleje FK
- Lyngby

Senior career*
Years	Team	Apps	(Gls)
2007–2010	Lyngby	31	(0)
2010–2013	ÍBV	61	(2)
2013–2015	Ull/Kisa	36	(2)
2015–2016	KR Reykjavík	17	(0)
2016–2022	Valur	91	(2)
2019	→ Fjölnir (loan)	21	(1)
2023	Afturelding	23	(1)
2024	ÍBV	6	(0)
2024–	Grótta	8	(1)

International career
2004–2006	Denmark U-17	29	(1)
2007	Denmark U-18	1	(0)
2007–2008	Denmark U-19	5	(0)
2009	Denmark U-21	1	(0)
- * Club domestic league appearances and goals as of 2 November 2024

Rasmus Steenberg Christiansen (born 6 October 1989) is a Danish professional footballer who plays as a defender for Icelandic club Grótta. He won the Icelandic championship in 2017 and 2018 with Valur.

== Career ==
Christiansen started his senior team career with Lyngby BK 2007 before moving to ÍBV in 2010. After three seasons with ÍBV, he left the club and signed with Ull/Kisa.

He returned to Iceland in 2015, signing with Knattspyrnufélag Reykjavíkur. After one season with KR, he joined Valur in December 2015. With Valur, helped the team win the Icelandic Cup in 2016 and the Icelandic championship in 2017 and 2018, although the later year, he missed the majority of the season due to a broken leg. After returning from his injury, he was loaned to Fjölnir ahead of the 2019 season in the 1. deild karla. With Christiansen, Fjölnir finished second in the league, achieving promotion to the Úrvalsdeild karla. After the season, he was selected the Player of the Year by the league's managers and team captains. Despite heavy interest from Fjölnir to keep him, he signed a 2-year contract extension with Valur in October 2019.

== Titles ==
- Úrvalsdeild karla: 2017, 2018, 2020
- Icelandic Cup: 2016
- Icelandic League Cup: 2018
- Icelandic Super Cup: 2016, 2017, 2018
