= 2018 Icelandic Men's Football League Cup =

Deildarbikar karla

Tournament details
- Country: Iceland
- Dates: 9 February 2018 – 5 April 2018
- Teams: 24

Final positions
- Champions: Valur
- Runners-up: Grindavík

Tournament statistics
- Matches played: 60
- Goals scored: 209 (3.48 per match)
- Top goal scorer(s): Gonzalo Zamorano Leon (6 goals)
- All statistics correct as of 18 March 2018.

The 2018 Icelandic Men's Football League Cup is the 23rd season of the Icelandic Men's League Cup, a pre-season professional football competition in Iceland. The tournament involves twenty-four clubs from the top two leagues in Iceland, Úrvalsdeild karla and 1. deild karla, and uses a combination of group and knockout rounds to determine which team is the winner of the tournament.

The tournament began on 9 February and will conclude with the final on 5 April 2018.

== Participating teams ==
Úrvalsdeild	1. deild karla
Breiðablik; FH; Fjölnir; Fylkir; Grindavík; ÍBV; KA; Keflavík; KR; Stjarnan; Valur; Víkingur R.	Fram; Haukar; HK; ÍA; ÍR; Leiknir R.; Magni; Njarðvík; Selfoss; Víkingur Ó.; Þór; Þróttur R.

== League tables ==
=== Group 1 ===
Pos	Team	Pld	W	D	L	GF	GA	GD	Pts	Qualification	VAL	ÍA	ÍBV	FRA	NJA	VÍK
1	Valur	5	5	0	0	14	2	+12	15	Qualification for the Semi-finals	—	2–0	3–1	—	3–0	—
2	ÍA	5	3	0	2	13	5	+8	9		—	—	4–0	4–0	—	3–0
3	ÍBV	5	2	1	2	6	10	−4	7		—	—	—	—	—	—
4	Fram	5	2	0	3	3	10	−7	6		0–4	—	0–1	—	2–1	—
5	Njarðvík	5	1	1	3	8	12	−4	4		—	3–2	2–2	—	—	2–3
6	Víkingur R.	5	1	0	4	5	10	−5	3		1–2	—	1–2	0–1	—	—

Updated to match(es) played on 18 March 2018. Source: ksí.is

9 February 2018 Matchday 1	ÍA	4–0	Fram	Akranes
19:00	Arnar Már Guðjónsson 49'; Ólafur Valur Valdimarsson 59'; Hilmar Halldórsson 86'; Bjarki Steinn Bjarkason 88'	ksi.is	Kristófer Jacobson Reyes (yellow card) 77' (red card)	Stadium: Akraneshöllin; Referee: Aðalbjörn Heiðar Þorsteinsson

12 February 2018 Matchday 1	Valur	3–0	Njarðvík	Reykjavík
18:00	Haukur Páll Sigurðsson 73'; Sigurður Egill Lárusson 81', 89' (pen.)	ksi.is		Stadium: Valsvöllur; Attendance: 30; Referee: Einar Ingi Jóhannsson

15 February 2018 Matchday 2	Njarðvík	3–2	ÍA	Reykjanesbær
18:40	Theodór Guðni Halldórsson 27'; Bergþór Ingi Smárason 71'; Arnór Björnsson 90+2'	ksi.is	Alexander Már Þorláksson 67'; Steinar Þorsteinsson 79'	Stadium: Reykjaneshöllin; Referee: Elías Ingi Árnason

17 February 2018 Matchday 2	Fram	0–1	ÍBV	Reykjavík
15:15		ksi.is	Ágúst Leó Björnsson 54'	Stadium: Egilshöll; Referee: Einar Ingi Jóhannsson

17 February 2018 Matchday 2	Víkingur R.	1–2	Valur	Reykjavík
17:15	Nikolaj Hansen 14'	ksi.is	Andri Fannar Stefánsson (red card); Thomsen 24', 88' (pen.)	Stadium: Egilshöll; Referee: Vilhjálmur Alvar Þórarinsson

22 February 2018 Matchday 3	Njarðvík	2–3	Víkingur R.	Reykjanesbær
18:40	Atli Freyr Ottesen Pálsson 75'; Neil Slooves 81'	ksi.is	Nikolaj Hansen 12'; Erlingur Agnarsson 13'; Halldór Jón Sigurður Þórðarson 90+4'	Stadium: Reykjaneshöllin; Attendance: 42; Referee: Guðmundur Ársæll Guðmundsson

24 February 2018 Matchday 3	Fram	0–4	Valur	Reykjavík
17:15		ksi.is	Thomsen 12', 87'; Patrick Pedersen 29'; Arnór Daði Aðalsteinsson 36' (o.g.)	Stadium: Egilshöll; Referee: Egill Arnar Sigurþórsson

1 March 2018 Matchday 3	ÍA	4–0	ÍBV	Akranes
18:00	Stefán Teitur Þórðarson 9'; Ólafur Valur Valdimarsson 38'; Hilmar Halldórsson 42'; Alexander Már Þorláksson 83'	ksi.is		Stadium: Akraneshöllin; Referee: Aðalbjörn Heiðar Þorsteinsson

9 March 2018 Matchday 4	Valur	2–0	ÍA	Reykjavík
19:00	Kristinn Freyr Sigurðsson 32'; Tobias Thomsen 36'	ksi.is		Stadium: Valsvöllur; Referee: Jóhann Ingi Jónsson

9 March 2018 Matchday 4	Víkingur R.	0–1	Fram	Reykjavík
21:00	Milos Ozegovic (yellow card) 90+5' (red card); Trausti Sigurbjörnsson (red card) 90+5'	ksi.is	Guðmundur Magnússon 24' (pen.); Kristófer Jacobson Reyes (yellow card) 58' (red card)	Stadium: Egilshöll; Referee: Guðgeir Einarsson

10 March 2018 Matchday 4	Njarðvík	2–2	ÍBV	Reykjanesbær
14:00	Kenneth Hogg 45+1'; Andri Fannar Freysson 52' (pen.)	ksi.is	Breki Ómarsson 8'; Róbert Aron Eysteinsson 11'	Stadium: Reykjaneshöllin; Referee: Þorvaldur Árnason

13 March 2018 Matchday 5	ÍA	3–0	Víkingur R.	Akranes
20:30	Ragnar Leósson 7'; Stefán Teitur Þórðarson 76'; Hilmar Halldórsson 85'	ksi.is		Stadium: Akraneshöllin; Attendance: 73; Referee: Vilhjálmur Alvar Þórarinsson

16 March 2018 Matchday 5	Valur	3–1	ÍBV	Reykjavík
18:00	Devon Már Griffin 53' (o.g.); Patrick Pedersen 58', 70'	ksi.is	Shahab Zahedi Tabar 44'	Stadium: Valsvöllur; Referee: Sigurður Hjörtur Þrastarson

16 March 2018 Matchday 5	Fram	2–1	Njarðvík	Reykjavík
19:00	Hlynur Atli Magnússon 24'; Orri Gunnarsson 80'	ksi.is	Theodór Guðni Halldórsson 2'	Stadium: Egilshöll; Referee: Guðmundur Ársæll Guðmundsson

18 March 2018 Matchday 1	Víkingur R.	1–2	ÍBV	Reykjavík
13:00	Rick ten Voorde 78' (pen.)	ksi.is	Shahab Zahedi Tabar 14'; Breki Ómarsson 76' (pen.)	Stadium: Víkingsvöllur; Referee: Jóhann Ingi Jónsson

=== Group 2 ===
Pos	Team	Pld	W	D	L	GF	GA	GD	Pts	Qualification	KA	BRE	KR	MAG	ÍR	ÞRÓ
1	KA	5	5	0	0	16	4	+12	15	Qualification for the Semi-finals	—	4–0	—	2–0	2–1	—
2	Breiðablik	5	3	1	1	17	5	+12	10		—	—	1–1	3–0	7–0	—
3	KR	5	2	2	1	7	5	+2	8		2–3	—	—	—	2–0	2–1
4	Magni	5	1	1	3	4	9	−5	4		—	—	0–0	—	—	3–1
5	ÍR	5	1	0	4	5	15	−10	3		—	—	—	3–1	—	1–3
6	Þróttur R.	5	1	0	4	6	17	−11	3		1–5	0–6	—	—	—	—

Updated to match(es) played on 17 March 2018. Source: ksí.is

9 February 2018 Matchday 1	KR	2–1	Þróttur R.	Reykjavík
19:00	Atli Sigurjónsson 81'; Björgvin Stefánsson 85'	ksi.is	Karl Brynjar Björnsson 39'	Stadium: Egilshöll; Attendance: 60; Referee: Sigurður Óli Þórleifsson

10 February 2018 Matchday 1	Breiðablik	7–0	ÍR	Kópavogur
12:00	Arnþór Ari Atlason 19', 39'; Gísli Eyjólfsson 41', 46', 87'; Viktor Örn Margeirsson 49'; Arnór Gauti Ragnarsson 82'	ksi.is		Stadium: Fífan; Referee: Guðmundur Ársæll Guðmundsson

11 February 2018 Matchday 1	KA	2–0	Magni	Akureyri
18:00	Sæþór Olgeirsson 5'; Daníel Hafsteinsson 44'	ksi.is		Stadium: Boginn; Referee: Þóroddur Hjaltalín

17 February 2018 Matchday 2	Magni	0–0	KR	Akureyri
15:00		ksi.is		Stadium: Boginn; Referee: Þóroddur Hjaltalín

17 February 2018 Matchday 2	KA	2–1	ÍR	Akureyri
17:00	Hallgrímur Mar Steingrímsson 20'; Hrannar Björn Steingrímsson 53'	ksi.is	Aron Skúli Brynjarsson 90+2'	Stadium: Boginn; Referee: Bjarni Hrannar Héðinsson

18 February 2018 Matchday 2	Þróttur R.	0–6	Breiðablik	Reykjavík
18:15		ksi.is	Hrvoje Tokić 25'; Arnþór Ari Atlason 27'; Gísli Eyjólfsson 80'; Sveinn Aron Guðjohnsen 86'; Arnór Gauti Ragnarsson 89', 90+3'	Stadium: Egilshöll; Referee: Aðalbjörn Heiðar Þorsteinsson

24 February 2018 Matchday 3	Breiðablik	3–0	Magni	Kópavogur
14:15	Elfar Freyr Helgason 12'; Andri Rafn Yeoman 39'; Aron Bjarnason 90+1'	ksi.is		Stadium: Fífan; Referee: Einar Ingi Jóhannsson

24 February 2018 Matchday 3	KR	2–3	KA	Reykjavík
15:15	Óskar Örn Hauksson 24', 57'	ksi.is	Elfar Árni Aðalsteinsson 9'; Daníel Hafsteinsson 68'; Frosti Brynjólfsson 69'	Stadium: Egilshöll; Referee: Erlendur Eiríksson

25 February 2018 Matchday 3	ÍR	1–3	Þróttur R.	Reykjavík
18:15	Brynjar Óli Bjarnason 90+2'		Aron Þórður Albertsson 22'; Viktor Jónsson 41'; Víðir Þorvarðarson 72'	Stadium: Egilshöll; Referee: Sigurður Óli Þórleifsson

10 March 2018 Matchday 4	Magni	3–1	Þróttur R.	Akureyri
19:00	Gunnar Örvar Stefánsson 12'; Þorgeir Ingvarsson 87'; Bergvin Jóhannsson 90'	ksi.is	Ólafur Hrannar Kristjánsson 65'; Hlynur Hauksson (yellow card) 75' (red card)	Stadium: Boginn; Referee: Vilhelm Adolfsson

11 March 2018 Matchday 4	KR	2–0	ÍR	Reykjavík
16:15	Björgvin Stefánsson 45'; Pálmi Rafn Pálmason 49'	ksi.is		Stadium: Egilshöll; Referee: Ívar Orri Kristjánsson

11 March 2018 Matchday 4	KA	4–0	Breiðablik	Akureyri
17:00	Daníel Hafsteinsson 1'; Elfar Árni Aðalsteinsson 9', 63' (pen.); Aleksandar Trninic 38'	ksi.is	Damir Muminovic (red card) 38'; Kolbeinn Þórðarson (yellow card) 90+2' (red card)	Stadium: Boginn; Referee: Þóroddur Hjaltalín

17 March 2018 Matchday 5	Breiðablik	1–1	KR	Kópavogur
11:00	Arnþór Ari Atlason 26'	ksi.is	Óskar Örn Hauksson 47'	Stadium: Fífan; Referee: Egill Arnar Sigurþórsson

17 March 2018 Matchday 5	ÍR	3–1	Magni	Reykjavík
15:15	Máni Austmann Hilmarsson 30', 90', 90+3'	ksi.is	Bergvin Jóhannsson 73'	Stadium: Egilshöll; Referee: Einar Ingi Jóhannsson

17 March 2018 Matchday 5	Þróttur R.	1–5	KA	Reykjavík
17:15	Aron Þórður Albertsson 76'	ksi.is	Hallgrímur Mar Steingrímsson 29'; Elfar Árni Aðalsteinsson 53', 87'; Archange Nkumu 73', 90+1'	Stadium: Egilshöll; Referee: Helgi Mikael Jónasson

=== Group 3 ===
Pos	Team	Pld	W	D	L	GF	GA	GD	Pts	Qualification
1	Stjarnan	5	4	0	1	11	6	+5	12	Qualification for the Semi-finals
2	Víkingur Ó.	5	3	1	1	8	8	0	10	
3	Fjölnir	5	2	2	1	14	8	+6	8	
4	Keflavík	5	2	1	2	9	5	+4	7	
5	Haukar	5	1	1	3	9	11	−2	4	
6	Leiknir R.	5	0	1	4	2	15	−13	1	

Updated to match(es) played on 17 March 2018. Source: ksí.is

9 February 2018 Matchday 1	Keflavík	0–1	Stjarnan	Reykjanesbær
20:00		ksi.is	Alex Þór 68'	Stadium: Reykjaneshöllin; Referee: Vilhjálmur Alvar Þórarinsson

11 February 2018 Matchday 1	Leiknir R.	1–4	Haukar	Reykjavík
18:15	Ágúst Freyr Hallsson 19'	ksi.is	Arnar Aðalgeirsson 11'; Indriði Áki Þorláksson 16'; Gunnar Gunnarsson (red card) 61'; Daði Snær Ingason 79', 81'	Stadium: Egilshöll; Referee: Egill Arnar Sigurþórsson

16 February 2018 Matchday 2	Keflavík	2–2	Fjölnir	Reykjanesbær
20:00	Jeppe Hansen 39'; Anton Freyr Hauks Guðlaugsson 69'	ksi.is	Ísak Óli Helgason 79'; Þórir Guðjónsson 90+5' (pen.)	Stadium: Reykjaneshöllin; Referee: Helgi Mikael Jónasson

17 February 2018 Matchday 2	Stjarnan	3–1	Haukar	Kópavogur
12:30	Baldur Sigurðsson 16'; Hilmar Árni Halldórsson 32'; Sölvi Snær Fodilsson 61'	ksi.is	Haukur Ásberg Hilmarsson 27'	Stadium: Kórinn; Attendance: 50; Referee: Erlendur Eiríksson

25 February 2018 Matchday 3	Haukar	2–3	Víkingur Ó.	Akranes
16:00	Þórður Jón Jóhannesson 57', 75'	ksi.is	Gonzalo Zamorano Leon 55', 65'; Sanjin Horoz 82'	Stadium: Akraneshöllin; Attendance: 35; Referee: Arnar Þór Stefánsson

25 February 2018 Matchday 3	Leiknir R.	0–4	Keflavík	Reykjavík
16:15		ksi.is	Marko Nikolic 7'; Jeppe Hansen 14' (pen.); Sindri Þór Guðmundsson 23', 60'	Stadium: Egilshöll; Attendance: 55; Referee: Þóroddur Hjaltalín

4 March 2018 Matchday 2	Víkingur Ó.	1–1	Leiknir R.	Akranes
19:00	Pétur Steinar Jóhannsson 58'	ksi.is	Vuk Óskar Dimitrijevic 61'	Stadium: Akraneshöllin; Attendance: 47; Referee: Gunnþór Steinar Jónsson

4 March 2018 Matchday 3	Fjölnir	5–2	Stjarnan	Reykjavík
20:15	Anton Freyr Ársælsson 17'; Almarr Ormarsson 19'; Ægir Jarl Jónasson 56'; Þórir Guðjónsson 61' (pen.); Birnir Snær Ingason 68'	ksi.is	Guðmundur Steinn Hafsteinsson 28'; Kári Pétursson 30'	Stadium: Egilshöll; Attendance: 78; Referee: Vilhjálmur Alvar Þórarinsson

10 March 2018 Matchday 4	Keflavík	3–1	Haukar	Reykjanesbær
12:00	Einar Orri Einarsson 51'; Ísak Óli Ólafsson 90+2'; Jeppe Hansen 90+3'	ksi.is	Ísak Jónsson 71'	Stadium: Reykjaneshöllin; Referee: Egill Arnar Sigurþórsson

10 March 2018 Matchday 4	Stjarnan	3–0	Víkingur Ó.	Kópavogur
12:30	Jóhann Laxdal 12'; Þorsteinn Már Ragnarsson 44'; Hilmar Árni Halldórsson 48'	ksi.is		Stadium: Kórinn; Referee: Helgi Mikael Jónasson

10 March 2018 Matchday 4	Fjölnir	4–0	Leiknir R.	Reykjavík
17:15	Bjarki Aðalsteinsson 17' (o.g.); Ægir Jarl Jónasson 44', 55'; Ísak Óli Helgason 50'	ksi.is		Stadium: Egilshöll; Referee: Aðalbjörn Heiðar Þorsteinsson

14 March 2018 Matchday 1	Fjölnir	2–3	Víkingur Ó.	Akranes
20:30	Birnir Snær Ingason 22'; Anton Freyr Ársælsson 70'	ksi.is	Gonzalo Zamorano Leon 77', 84' (pen.), 88'	Stadium: Akraneshöllin; Referee: Elías Ingi Árnason

17 March 2018 Matchday 5	Leiknir R.	0–2	Stjarnan	Kópavogur
12:30		ksi.is	Hilmar Árni Halldórsson 12', 47'	Stadium: Kórinn; Referee: Vilhjálmur Alvar Þórarinsson

17 March 2018 Matchday 5	Haukar	1–1	Fjölnir	Hafnarfjörður
13:00	Gylfi Steinn Guðmundsson 65'	ksi.is	Anton Freyr Ársælsson 18'; Sigurjón Daði Harðarson (red card) 69'	Stadium: Gaman Ferða völlurinn Referee: Gunnþór Steinar Jónsson

17 March 2018 Matchday 5	Víkingur Ó.	1–0	Keflavík	Akranes
13:00	Gonzalo Zamorano Leon 79'	ksi.is		Stadium: Akraneshöllin; Attendance: 30; Referee: Ívar Orri Kristjánsson

=== Group 4 ===
Pos	Team	Pld	W	D	L	GF	GA	GD	Pts	Qualification	GRI	FYL	HK	FH	SEL	ÞÓR
1	Grindavík	5	4	1	0	12	2	+10	13	Qualification for the Semi-finals	—	3–0	—	—	—	0–0
2	Fylkir	5	3	1	1	10	7	+3	10		—	—	2–2	2–1	4–1	—
3	HK	5	2	2	1	11	11	0	8		1–4	—	—	1–1	—	4–3
4	FH	5	2	1	2	8	9	−1	7		0–3	—	—	—	3–1	—
5	Selfoss	5	1	0	4	6	12	−6	3		1–2	—	1–3	—	—	—
6	Þór	5	0	1	4	5	11	−6	1		—	0–2	—	2–3	0–2	—

Updated to match(es) played on 17 March 2018. Source: ksí.is

9 February 2018 Matchday 1	HK	1–4	Grindavík	Kópavogur
18:00	Guðmundur Þór Júlíusson 27'	ksi.is	Alexander Veigar Þórarinsson 67', 86' (pen.); Nemanja Latinovic 73'; Gunnar Þorsteinsson 89'	Stadium: Kórinn; Referee: Jóhann Ingi Jónsson

11 February 2018 Matchday 1	Fylkir	2–1	FH	Reykjavík
20:15	Hákon Ingi Jónsson 12'; Ragnar Bragi Sveinsson 86'	ksi.is	Steven Lennon 18'	Stadium: Egilshöll; Referee: Helgi Mikael Jónasson

18 February 2018 Matchday 2	Grindavík	0–0	Þór	Akranes
15:00	Sigurjón Rúnarsson (red card) 58'	ksi.is		Stadium: Akraneshöllin; Referee: Ívar Orri Kristjánsson

18 February 2018 Matchday 2	FH	3–1	Selfoss	Reykjanesbær
16:00	Steven Lennon 22' (pen.), 54'; Halldór Orri Björnsson 45'	ksi.is	Magnús Ingi Einarsson 73'	Stadium: Reykjaneshöllin; Attendance: 55; Referee: Pétur Guðmundsson

18 February 2018 Matchday 2	Fylkir	2–2	HK	Reykjavík
16:15	Oddur Ingi Guðmundsson 32'; Hákon Ingi Jónsson 34'	ksi.is	Guðmundur Þór Júlíusson 68', 85'	Stadium: Egilshöll; Referee: Guðmundur Ársæll Guðmundsson

23 February 2018 Matchday 3	HK	1–1	FH	Kópavogur
18:00	Guðmundur Þór Júlíusson 39'	ksi.is	Steven Lennon 90+2'	Stadium: Kórinn; Attendance: 108; Referee: Pétur Guðmundsson

24 February 2018 Matchday 3	Selfoss	1–2	Grindavík	Selfoss
14:00	Gilles Mbang Ondo 76'	ksi.is	Jóhann Helgi Hannesson 26'; René Joensen 81'	Stadium: JÁVERK-völlurinn; Referee: Helgi Mikael Jónasson

24 February 2018 Matchday 3	Þór	0–2	Fylkir	Akureyri
17:00		ksi.is	Oddur Ingi Guðmundsson 22'; Hákon Ingi Jónsson 50' (pen.)	Stadium: Boginn; Referee: Sigurður Hjörtur Þrastarson

4 March 2018 Matchday 1	Þór	0–2	Selfoss	Akureyri
17:00		ksi.is	Magnús Ingi Einarsson 2'; Gylfi Dagur Leifsson 41'	Stadium: Boginn; Referee: Steinar Gauti Þórarinsson

9 March 2018 Matchday 4	Fylkir	4–1	Selfoss	Reykjavík
19:00	Hákon Ingi Jónsson 12'; Albert Brynjar Ingason 58'; Þorsteinn Daníel Þorsteinsson 67' (o.g.); Jonathan Glenn 89'	ksi.is	Ingi Rafn Ingibergsson 90+3'	Stadium: Egilshöll; Referee: Einar Ingi Jóhannsson

10 March 2018 Matchday 4	HK	4–3	Þór	Kópavogur
17:00	Ingiberg Ólafur Jónsson 32'; Bjarni Gunnarsson 42', 90+3' (pen.); Hafsteinn Briem 45+1'	ksi.is	Alvaro Montejo Calleja 12' (pen.); Guðni Sigþórsson 16', 61'	Stadium: Kórinn; Referee: Einar Ingi Jóhannsson

11 March 2018 Matchday 4	FH	0–3	Grindavík	Reykjavík
12:00		ksi.is	Aron Jóhannsson 27'; René Joensen 45'; Sam Hewson 66'	Stadium: Leiknisvöllur; Referee: Erlendur Eiríksson

17 March 2018 Matchday 5	Selfoss	1–3	HK	Selfoss
14:00	Gilles Mbang Ondo 87'	ksi.is	Ingiberg Ólafur Jónsson 24'; Ásgeir Marteinsson 83', 85'	Stadium: JÁVERK-völlurinn; Referee: Arnar Þór Stefánsson

17 March 2018 Matchday 5	Grindavík	3–0	Fylkir	Reykjanesbær
14:00	Sam Hewson 28'; Björn Berg Bryde 40'; René Joensen 78'	ksi.is		Stadium: Reykjaneshöllin; Referee: Elías Ingi Árnason

17 March 2018 Matchday 5	Þór	2–3	FH	Akureyri
17:00	Þórarinn Ingi Valdimarsson 37' (o.g.); Ingi Freyr Hilmarsson 41'	ksi.is	Atli Viðar Björnsson 8'; Steven Lennon 37' (pen.); Halldór Orri Björnsson 90+2'	Stadium: Boginn; Referee: Bjarni Hrannar Héðinsson

== Knockout stage ==
=== Semi-finals ===
The top team of each group will enter the semi-finals stage.

23 March 2018	Valur	3–1	Stjarnan	Reykjavík
18:00	Patrick Pedersen 8', 85'; Dion Acoff 69'	ksi.is	Hilmar Árni Halldórsson 65'	Stadium: Valsvöllur

29 March 2018	KA	0–1	Grindavík	Akureyri
14:00		ksi.is	Gunnar Þorsteinsson 57'	Stadium: Boginn; Referee: Þóroddur Hjaltalín

=== Final ===
The final will be played on 9 April 2018.

9 April 2018	Valur	4–2	Grindavík	Reykjavík
19:30		ksi.is		Stadium: Valbjarnarvöllur; Referee: Vilhjálmur Alvar Þórarinsson

== Top goalscorers ==
As of matches played on 18 March 2018

Rank	Player	Club	Goals
1	(Spain) Gonzalo Zamorano Leon	Víkingur Ó.	6
2	(Denmark) Tobias Thomsen	Valur	5
2	(Scotland) Steven Lennon	FH	5
2	(Iceland) Elfar Árni Aðalsteinsson	KA	5
5	(Iceland) Gísli Eyjólfsson	Breiðablik	4
5	(Iceland) Guðmundur Þór Júlíusson	HK	4
5	(Iceland) Hákon Ingi Jónsson	Fylkir	4
5	(Iceland) Hilmar Árni Halldórsson	Stjarnan	4
5	(Iceland) Arnþór Ari Atlason	Breiðablik	4
10	(Iceland) Arnór Gauti Ragnarsson	Breiðablik	3
10	(Iceland) Magnús Ingi Einarsson	Selfoss	3
10	(Iceland) Hilmar Halldórsson	ÍA	3
10	(Iceland) Daníel Hafsteinsson	KA	3
10	(Denmark) Jeppe Hansen	Keflavík	3
10	(Iceland) Ægir Jarl Jónasson	Fjölnir	3
10	(Iceland) Anton Freyr Ársælsson	Fjölnir	3
10	(Denmark) Patrick Pedersen	Valur	3
10	(Iceland) Óskar Örn Hauksson	KR	3
10	(Iceland) Máni Austmann Hilmarsson	ÍR	3
10	(Faroe Islands) René Joensen	Grindavík	3
