= Anton Ari Einarsson =

Icelandic football goalkeeper

Personal information
- Full name: Anton Ari Einarsson
- Date of birth: 25 August 1994 (age 32)
- Place of birth: Reykjavík, Iceland
- Position: Goalkeeper

Team information
- Current team: Breiðablik
- Number: 1

Youth career
- –2011: Afturelding

Senior career*
Years	Team	Apps	(Gls)
2011–2013	Afturelding	26	(0)
2011	→ Hvíti riddarinn (loan)	8	(0)
2014–2019	Valur	77	(0)
2014	→ Tindastóll (loan)	9	(0)
2016	→ Grindavík (loan)	1	(0)
2020–	Breiðablik	171	(0)

International career^{‡}
2018–	Iceland	3	(0)
- * Club domestic league appearances and goals as of 1 November 2026 ‡ National team caps and goals as of 18 March 2026

Anton Ari Einarsson (born 25 August 1994) is an Icelandic football goalkeeper who plays for Breiðablik of the Icelandic Besta deild karla (previously known as the Úrvalsdeild) and the Iceland national team. A two-time winner of the Icelandic championship, he was named the Úrvalsdeild Goalkeeper of the Year in 2022.

== Club career ==
Anton began his career with Afturelding, but he had a short loan spell with Fourth division side Hvíti riddarinn before he made his Afturelding debut. In 2014, he signed for Úrvalsdeild side Valur. Anton had loan spells at Tindastóll and Grindavík before breaking in as the first-choice keeper for Valur. He won the Icelandic championship with Valur in 2017 and 2018. Prior to the 2020 season, he signed with Breiðablik. In 2022, he was named the Úrvalsdeild Goalkeeper of the Year.

== International career ==
In 2017, Anton was called up to play for Iceland's national football team for a friendly match against Mexico. He made his full debut coming on as a half-time substitute in Iceland's 6–0 win over Indonesia Selection in a friendly.

== Honours ==
=== Titles ===
Valur

- Icelandic Championships (2): 2017, 2018
- Icelandic Cups (2): 2015, 2016
- Icelandic League Cups (1): 2018

=== Individual awards ===
- Úrvalsdeild Goalkeeper of the Year: 2022
