= Patrick Pedersen =

Danish footballer

Personal information
- Date of birth: 25 November 1991 (age 34)
- Place of birth: Hirtshals, Denmark
- Height: 1.79 m (5 ft 10 in)
- Position: Striker

Team information
- Current team: Valur
- Number: 9

Senior career*
Years	Team	Apps	(Gls)
2011–2014	Vendsyssel	26	(4)
2013	→ Valur (loan)	9	(5)
2014–2015	Valur	33	(19)
2016–2017	Viking	34	(6)
2017–2018	Valur	30	(23)
2019	Sheriff Tiraspol	14	(3)
2019–	Valur	145	(90)
- * Club domestic league appearances and goals as of 16 November 2026

Patrick Pedersen (born 25 November 1991) is a Danish footballer who plays as a striker for Valur.

== Career ==
In December 2015, Pedersen signed for Norwegian Tippeligaen side Viking FK.

He got his league debut in Viking's first game of the season away against Vålerenga on 14 March 2016. Viking won the game 2–0.

Pedersen scored his first goal for Viking on 13 April in the Norwegian Cup against Vardeneset. The match ended 5–1 to Viking, and Pedersen scored four of the five goals for Viking. His other cup goal came against Vard Haugesund a few weeks later.

Despite being top scorer in Iceland, it took quite a while for Pedersen to score his first league goal for Viking. His first goal however, was not only an important one, but also a beautiful goal. Opponent Odd was leading 2–1 with a few seconds left before full-time. Then Pedersen, which came in as a substitute, got the ball and shot it right into the top corner. The game was drawn 2–2, and each team got a point. This match was played on 24 July, and ended Pedersen's many months of missing the target.

After the spell in Norway, he returned to Iceland to play for Valur.

In December 2018, Pedersen signed for Moldovan side Sheriff Tiraspol, leaving them on 1 July 2019.

He joined Icelandic club Valur for the third time in his career in the summer of 2019, carrying on scoring goals and winning trophies as before. In the first game of the 2024 season he scored his first goal of the new season and in doing so Pedersen scored his 100th club goal for Valur and at the same time joined the 100 goal club in Icelandic top division, and is currently the highest scoring foreign player in the Icelandic top flight.

On 6 July 2024, in a game against Fylkir, Pedersen scored two goals; these were his 109 and 110th goals for Valur and he became Valurs all-time top goal scorer, surpassing Ingi Björn Albertsson's record of 109 goals for Valur. On 29 September 2024, Pedersen scored his 114th goal for Valur, making him the highest goalscorer for one club in the Icelandic top flight.

Pedersen started the 2025 season brightly scoring many goals, on 27 July he equalled the goalscoring record in the Icelandic top flight, he scored his 15th goal of the seasin, and his 131st league goal in totan, in a game against FH, equaling Tryggvi Gudmundsson record and only needing 205 games to do so. Fans of the Icelandic giant chanting his name "Vi har Pedersen" in recognition of this major achievement.

On 5 August 2025, in an away game against ÍA Akranes, Pedersen cemented his place as an alltime great in the Icelandic top flight, smashing Tryggvi Guðmundsson 14 year old goalscoring record with his first goal of the match, finishing off a smooth team move, he scored his second of the game with a penalty kick, his 133rd goal in the Icelandic top flight.

== Career statistics ==
As of match played 20 September 2026

Appearances and goals by club, season and competition
Club	Season	League			National cup (Note: Includes Icelandic Men's Football Cup, Norwegian Football Cup, Moldovan Cup)		League cup (Note: Includes Icelandic Men's Football League Cup)		Europe		Other		Total	
Club	Season	Division	Apps	Goals	Apps	Goals	Apps	Goals	Apps	Goals	Apps	Goals	Apps	Goals
Valur (loan)	2013	Úrvalsdeild	9	5	0	0	0	0	—		—		9	5
Valur	2014	Úrvalsdeild	13	6	0	0	0	0	—		—		13	6
Valur	2015	Úrvalsdeild	20	13	5	4	7	7	—		—		32	24
Valur	Total		42	24	5	4	7	7	0	0	0	0	54	35
Viking	2016	Eliteserien	28	5	3	5	—		—		—		31	10
Viking	2017	Eliteserien	6	1	2	1	—		—		—		8	2
Viking	Total		34	6	5	6	0	0	0	0	0	0	39	12
Valur	2017	Úrvalsdeild	9	6	0	0	0	0	—		—		9	6
Valur	2018	Úrvalsdeild	21	17	2	0	6	5	5 (Note: Two appearances in UEFA Champions League, three appearances in UEFA Europa League)	0	1 (Note: Appearance in Icelandic Super Cup)	1	35	23
Valur	Total		30	23	2	0	6	5	5	0	1	1	44	29
Sheriff Tiraspol	2019	Divizia Națională	14	3	3	2	—		0	0	1 (Note: Appearance in Moldovan Super Cup)	0	18	5
Valur	2019	Úrvalsdeild	11	8	0	0	0	0	4 (Note: Two appearances in UEFA Champions League, two appearances in UEFA Europa League)	0	—		15	8
Valur	2020	Úrvalsdeild	17	15	2	1	2	3	—		—		21	19
Valur	2021	Úrvalsdeild	21	9	2	0	5	4	4 (Note: Two appearances in UEFA Champions League, two appearances in UEFA Europa Conference League)	0	—		32	13
Valur	2022	Besta deild karla	22	8	0	0	4	0	—		—		26	8
Valur	2023	Besta deild karla	19	12	0	0	0	0	—		—		19	12
Valur	2024	Besta deild karla	27	17	4	3	6	4	4 (Note: Appearances in UEFA Conference League)	1	—		38	25
Valur	2025	Besta deild karla	19	18	4	3	7	9	3	0	—		31	28
Valur	2026	Besta deild karla	9	3	0	0	0	0	4	0	—		13	3
Valur	Total		145	90	112	7	24	20	19	1	—		195	118
Career total			266	146	27	19	37	33	24	1	2	1	361	199

== Honours ==
Valur

- Úrvalsdeild: 2017, 2018, 2020
- Icelandic Cup: 2015
- Icelandic League Cup: 2018, 2023, 2025
- Icelandic Super Cup: 2018

Sheriff Tiraspol

- Divizia Națională: 2019
- Moldovan Cup: 2018–19

Individual

- Besta deild karla All-time top scorer: 133 goals
- Besta deild karla Player of the Year: 2018
- Besta deild karla top scorer: 2015, 2018, 2025
