= Sigurbjörn Örn Hreiðarsson =

Icelandic footballer

Personal information
- Date of birth: 25 November 1975 (age 50)
- Place of birth: Reykjavík, Iceland
- Height: 1.78 m (5 ft 10 in)
- Position: Midfielder

Youth career
- Víkingur
- –1990: UMFS Dalvík
- Valur

Senior career*
Years	Team	Apps	(Gls)
1990	UMFS Dalvík		
1991–1999	Valur	105	(18)
2000–2001	Trelleborgs FF		
2001–2011	Valur	152	(28)
2012–2014	Haukar	30	(2)
2014	KH	1	(0)
2018	Ármann	0	(0)

International career
1990–1991	Iceland U16	9	(3)
1990–1991	Iceland U17	5	(1)
1992–1994	Iceland U19	18	(5)
1995–1996	Iceland U21	3	(0)

Managerial career
- 2013–2014: Haukar
- 2014–2019: Valur (assistant)
- 2019: Grindavík
- * Club domestic league appearances and goals

Sigurbjörn Örn Hreiðarsson (born 25 November 1975) is a retired Icelandic football midfielder. He retired as Valur's leader in most games played in the Icelandic top-tier Úrvalsdeild karla. He played for Trelleborgs FF from 2000 to 2001.

== Early life ==
Sigurbjörn was born in Reykjavík, Iceland, but moved to Dalvík when he was 8 years old. He debuted with UMFS Dalvík's senior team in 1990 at the age of 15. In the fall, he moved with his family back to Reykjavík where he started playing with Valur.

== Managing career ==
In October 2013, Sigurbjörn was hired as the manager of Haukar. In October 2014, Sigurbjörn was hired as an assistant manager to Ólafur Jóhannesson at Valur. In October 2019, he signed a two-year contract to coach Grindavík.
