= Óskar Hrafn Þorvaldsson =

Icelandic footballer and manager

Óskar Þorvaldsson
Personal information
- Full name: Óskar Hrafn Þorvaldsson
- Date of birth: 25 October 1973 (age 53)
- Place of birth: Iceland
- Position: Defender

Senior career*
Years	Team	Apps	(Gls)
1991–1997	KR Reykjavík	71	(1)
1998	Strømsgodset	7	(0)

International career
1989	Iceland U16	6	(0)
1989	Iceland U17	1	(1)
1990–1992	Iceland U19	12	(1)
1992–1995	Iceland U21	11	(0)
1997–1998	Iceland	3	(0)

Managerial career
- 2018–2019: Grótta
- 2020–2023: Breiðablik
- 2023–2024: Haugesund
- 2024–: KR Reykjavík
- * Club domestic league appearances and goals

Óskar Hrafn Þorvaldsson (born 25 October 1973) is an Icelandic football coach and former player.

== Playing career ==
After playing the majority of his career with Knattspyrnufélag Reykjavíkur, Óskar finished his career with Strømsgodset in the Norwegian Tippeligaen. He retired in 1999, at the age of 25, due to a back injury. He won three caps for the Iceland national team.

== Managerial career ==
He started his manager career with Grótta in the third tier of Icelandic football in 2018, placing second and getting promoted. In the 2019 second tier season he guided Grótta to first place in the league and promotion to the top tier. After the season he was hired by Breiðablik, with Grótta hiring Ágúst Gylfason who had just vacated the manager role at Breiðablik. In 2019 Óskar Hrafn was voted the coach of the year in Icelandic sports as the Icelandic Sportsperson of the Year was announced.

In October 2023, Norwegian Eliteserien club Haugesund announced that Óskar would become head coach starting from the 2024 season. In May 2024, he resigned after only seven matches in charge of the club.

In August 2024, he was appointed head coach of Knattspyrnufélag Reykjavíkur in the Icelandic Úrvalsdeild, taking charge immediately rather than at the end of the season as originally planned.

== Personal life ==
Óskar worked as a journalist for several years and was a news editor for Vísir.is, Dagblaðið Vísir and Stöð 2, where he was the head of Stöð 2 Sport.

His son is footballer Orri Óskarsson. When Óskar managed Grótta in 2018, Óskar gave Orri his senior debut 11 days before Orri's 14th birthday. And his daughter, Emilia Óskardóttir, is also a footballer.

== Honours ==
KR Reykjavík

- Icelandic Cup: 1994, 1995
- Icelandic Super Cup: 1996
