= Pedro Hipólito =

Portuguese footballer and manager

Personal information
- Full name: Pedro Manuel da Cunha Hipólito
- Date of birth: September 16, 1978 (age 48)
- Place of birth: Lisbon, Portugal
- Position: Midfielder

Team information
- Current team: Cinfães (Manager)

Youth career
- 1986–1990: Domingos Sávio
- 1990–1997: Benfica

Senior career*
Years	Team	Apps	(Gls)
1997–1999	Torreense	18	(1)
1999–2003	Académica de Coimbra	53	(1)
2003–2004	Farense		
2004–2005	Amora	26	(3)
2005–2006	Olivais e Moscavide		
2006–2007	Caniçal		

International career
1994	Portugal U15	7	(2)
1995	Portugal U16	10	(0)
1995–1996	Portugal U17	5	(0)
1995–1997	Portugal U18	23	(2)

Managerial career
- 2013–2014: Joane
- 2014: Ribeirão
- 2015–2016: Atlético CP
- 2017–2018: Fram Reykjavík
- 2019: ÍBV
- 2020: Anadia
- 2020–2021: Næstved
- 2023: Melaka
- 2023–2025: O Elvas
- 2025: Cinfães
- 2025-: Sanjoanense
- * Club domestic league appearances and goals

Pedro Manuel da Cunha Hipólito (born 16 September 1978) is a Portuguese football manager and former player. He is the current manager of Portuguese club Cinfães.
