= Gunnar Gunnarsson (footballer) =

Icelandic footballer

Personal information
- Date of birth: 14 June 1933 (age 93)

International career
Years	Team	Apps	(Gls)
1953–1957	Iceland	7	(1)

Gunnar Gunnarsson (born 14 June 1933) is an Icelandic former footballer. He played in seven matches for the Iceland national football team from 1953 to 1957.
