= Origo hf. =

Icelandic information technology services company

- Company type: Hlutafélag
- Traded as: Nasdaq Iceland: ORIGO
- Industry: information technology
- Founded: 1946
- Headquarters: Reykjavík, Iceland
- Key people: Jón Björnsson (CEO); Hjalti Þórarinsson (Chairman)
- Number of employees: 500
- Website: www.origo.is

Origo hf. is an Icelandic company that provides information technology services.

== Profile ==
Origo has holdings in numerous subsidiaries: Applicon in Sweden, Denmark, UK and Iceland, ParX Business Consulting ehf., Dansupport in Denmark, Klak ehf., SimDex ehf. and Linkur ehf. It currently has approximately 750 employees.

== History ==
Origo claims it has predecessor companies stretching back to 1899. In 1946 the company Skrifstofuvélar hf. was founded by Ottó A. Michelsen, and in 1949 it had acquired a private licence to sell IBM products in Iceland. In 1967, IBM Iceland was founded. Later in 1987, the company Gísli J. Johnsen-Skrifstofubúnaður hf. bought Skrifstofuvélar hf. and merged under the name Skrifstofuvélar-Sund hf.

Origo was formed in 1992 as Nýherji, through the merger of IBM Iceland hf. and Skrifstofuvélar-Sund hf. Shares in Nýherji were listed on the Iceland Stock Exchange from 1997.

In January 2018, Nýherji and its subsidiaries Applicon and TM Software merged under the name Origo.

In May 2019 it was announced that Origo had purchased all the shares in the IT company Strikamerki hf.
