= Orri Sigurður Ómarsson =

Icelandic footballer (born 1995)

Personal information
- Full name: Orri Sigurður Ómarsson
- Date of birth: 18 February 1995 (age 31)
- Place of birth: Iceland
- Height: 1.87 m (6 ft 2 in)
- Position: Centre back

Team information
- Current team: Valur
- Number: 20

Youth career
- 2001–2012: HK
- 2012–2014: AGF

Senior career*
Years	Team	Apps	(Gls)
2011	HK	20	(0)
2014	AGF	0	(0)
2015–2018	Valur	65	(1)
2018–2019	Sarpsborg 08	1	(0)
2018	→ HamKam (loan)	13	(0)
2019–	Valur	103	(5)

International career^{‡}
2010–2012	Iceland U17	23	(0)
2011–2014	Iceland U19	23	(4)
2013–2016	Iceland U21	21	(0)
2017–	Iceland	4	(0)
- * Club domestic league appearances and goals as of 16 November 2026 ‡ National team caps and goals as of 22 January 2018

Orri Sigurður Ómarsson (born 18 February 1995) is an Icelandic football player who plays as a centre back for Valur.

== Career ==
Orri started his career playing for HK. He played 20 games during the 2011 season.

In 2012, he joined Aarhus Gymnastikforening (AGF) under 19 team.

On 22 July 2014 he was promoted to the AGF first team.

In 2015, he joined Valur in the Icelandic Premier League.

In January 2018, Orri joined Sarpsborg 08. He was immediately loaned out to HamKam.

== International ==
He made his debut for Iceland national football team on 10 January 2017 in a friendly against China. He was not selected for Iceland's 2018 FIFA World Cup squad.
