= Thomas Guldborg Christensen =

Danish footballer (born 1984)

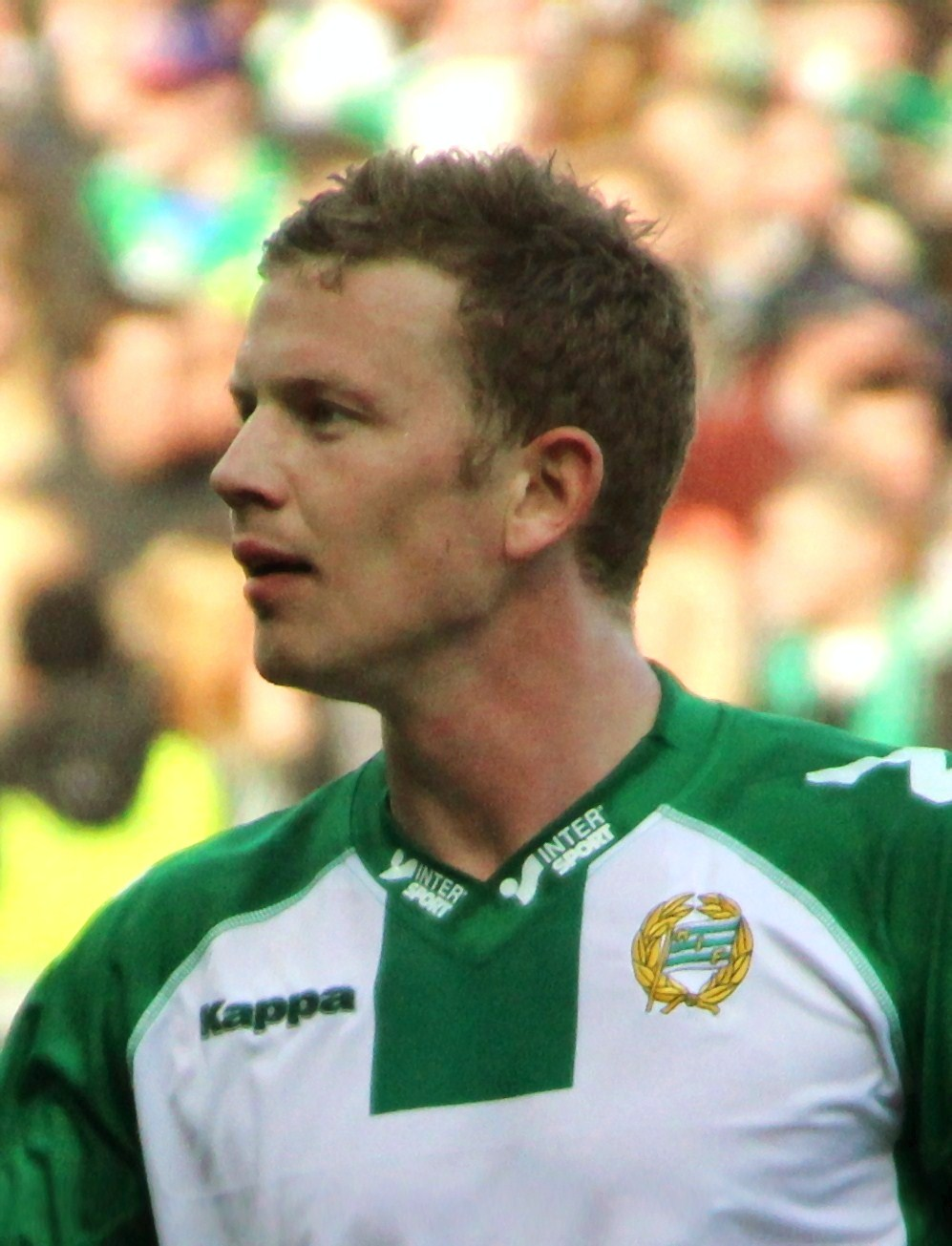
- Guldborg Christensen with Hammarby IF

Personal information
- Date of birth: 20 January 1984 (age 42)
- Place of birth: Bagsværd, Denmark
- Height: 1.87 m (6 ft 2 in)
- Position: Defender

Youth career
- Akademisk Boldklub

Senior career*
Years	Team	Apps	(Gls)
2001–2004	Akademisk Boldklub	37	(0)
2004–2006	Viborg FF	16	(0)
2006–2007	Vejle BK	7	(0)
2007	→ Herfølge Boldklub (loan)	0	(0)
2008–2009	Herfølge Boldklub	24	(1)
2009–2012	HB Køge	51	(0)
2012–2015	Hammarby IF	53	(1)
2015	Valur	13	(0)
2015–2017	Lyngby BK	18	(0)

International career
2000	Denmark U16	3	(0)
2000–2001	Denmark U17	13	(0)
2002	Denmark U18	1	(0)
2001–2003	Denmark U19	13	(0)
2004	Denmark U20	2	(0)
- * Club domestic league appearances and goals

Thomas Guldborg Christensen (born 20 January 1984) is a Danish former professional footballer who played as a defender.

== Career ==
Until the age of 20, Guldborg Christensen played for the local team Akademisk Boldklub, where he in 2001 made his senior debut in the Danish Superliga. During this tenure he won several caps for the Danish younger national teams. Three years later, in 2004, he signed a contract with Viborg FF.

On 1 July 2006, Guldborg Christensen joined Vejle on a two-year contract. But only a half year later, in January 2007, he went on loan to Herfølge, where he later signed permanently. The club rebranded itself as HB Køge in 2009 where he continuously played as a regular. He was appointed as the new team captain in 2010.

In 2012, Guldborg Christensen moved abroad for the first time in his career, signing for Hammarby IF in the Swedish Superettan. He linked up with his former teammate Mikael Rynell at the Stockholm-based outfit. He soon established himself as a regular starter at the centre back position, whilst being a part of a successful promotion campaign to Allsvenskan in 2014. Guldborg Christensen signed a new one-year contract with the club in November said year.

Guldborg Christensen left the club by mutual consent in May 2015, failing to make a single appearance for "Bajen" in Allsvenskan. He immediately signed a short time-deal with the Icelandic club Valur, competing in the Úrvalsdeild.

Guldborg Christensen returned to his native country in August 2015, signing a two-year contract with Lyngby BK in the Danish second tier.

On 7 December 2017, he announced his retirement to instead work for the Danish Football Association as a coordinator for the youth national teams.
