= Ólafur Jóhannesson (football manager) =

Icelandic footballer and manager (born 1957)

Personal information
- Full name: Ólafur Davíð Jóhannesson
- Date of birth: 30 June 1957 (age 69)
- Place of birth: Reykjavík, Iceland
- Position: Defender

Senior career*
Years	Team	Apps	(Gls)
- Haukar
1986	FH	16	(0)
1987	Valur	5	(0)
1989–1990	FH	18	(0)
1991	Haukar		
1991	FH	10	(0)
1992	Þróttur Reykjavík	2	(0)

Managerial career
- 1981–1982: Einherji
- 1983–1985: Skallagrímur
- 1988–1990: FH
- 1992: Þróttur
- 1993: Haukar
- 1995: FH
- 1996–1997: Skallagrímur
- 1998: UMF Selfoss
- 1998: Skallagrímur
- 2002: ÍR
- 2003–2007: FH
- 2007–2011: Iceland
- 2011–2013: Haukar
- 2014–2019: Valur
- 2020: Stjarnan
- 2021–2022: FH
- 2022: Valur
- * Club domestic league appearances and goals

Ólafur Davíð Jóhannesson (born 30 June 1957) is an Icelandic football manager and former player who formerly managed the Iceland national team. During his manager career, he has won the Icelandic championship five times and the Icelandic Cup three times.

During his playing career, he played most of his years as a senior player with Haukar in the role of defender, but started his career as manager only 24 years of age with the team Einherji from Vopnafjörður. He has managed Einherji, Skallagrímur, FH, Þróttur, Haukar, Selfoss, ÍR and Valur.

== Managerial career ==
=== FH ===
Ólafur Jóhannesson managed FH a total of three times, the most recent and successful between the years 2002 and 2008.

During those years FH rose up to become a major power in Icelandic football. In his first season as manager, Ólafur steered his team to second place, FH highest finish in years.

Next season he did even better and made them champions and secured a place in the qualifying rounds of the Champions League. Ólafur won two more championships in the years 2005 and 2006 and winning the first VISA-cup in the history of FH in 2007.

=== Icelandic national team ===
Ólafur signed a two-year contract on 29 October 2007, after leaving his post as manager of Icelandic side FH. His first game in charge was against Denmark in November 2007. Ólafur has worked as a carpenter as well as being a manager for years.

== Honours ==
=== Manager ===
FH

- Úrvalsdeild karla: 2004, 2005, 2006
- Icelandic Cup: 2007
- Icelandic League Cup: 2004, 2006, 2007, 2022
- Icelandic Super Cup: 2005, 2006, 2007

Valur

- Úrvalsdeild karla: 2017, 2018
- Icelandic Cup: 2015, 2016
- Icelandic League Cup: 2018
- Icelandic Super Cup: 2016, 2017, 2018
