= Emil Atlason =

Icelandic footballer (born 1993)

Personal information
- Full name: Emil Atlason
- Date of birth: 22 July 1993 (age 33)
- Place of birth: Iceland
- Height: 1.89 m (6 ft 2 in)
- Position: Striker

Team information
- Current team: Stjarnan
- Number: 22

Youth career
- –2012: FH

Senior career*
| Years | Team | Apps | (Gls) |
| 2012–2015 | KR Reykjavík | 51 | (10) |
| 2015 | → Preußen Münster | 4 | (0) |
| 2015 | → Valur (loan) | 8 | (2) |
| 2016–2018 | Þróttur Reykjavík | 19 | (6) |
| 2019 | HK | 21 | (3) |
| 2020– | Stjarnan | 132 | (61) |

International career^{‡}
| 2012–2014 | Iceland U-21 | 12 | (8) |
| 2026– | Iceland | 1 | (0) |
- * Club domestic league appearances and goals as of 16 November 2026 ‡ National team caps and goals as of 25 February 2026

Emil Atlason (born 22 July 1993) is an Icelandic footballer, who currently plays for Stjarnan and the Iceland national team.

== Club career ==
Emil Atlason began his career with FH but did not make a senior debut for the club. In 2012, he joined KR. In 2015, Emil had loan spells with Preußen Münster and Valur. Emil joined Þróttur Reykjavík in 2016. On 12 May 2016, he suffered a broken leg which ruled him out for the remainder of the season. Emil returned in 2017 and started against Haukar. He scored but Þróttur lost 2–1. He scored again in a 2–1 over ÍR. However, he tore his ACL in the third game of the season against Þor. On July 10, 2026, Atlason scored a hattrick in a Conference League first qualifying round match against Faroese side Víkingur Gøta.

== Personal life ==
Emil is the son of former Iceland international player Atli Eðvaldsson and his sister is Iceland international Sif Atladóttir.

== Honours ==
KR

Winner

- Úrvalsdeild: 2013
- Icelandic Cup: 2012, 2014
- Icelandic Super Cup: 2012, 2014

Runners-up

- Icelandic Super Cup: 2013
- Reykjavik Tournament: 2014

Valur

Winner

- Icelandic Cup: 2015
