= Munck =

Munck may refer to:

- Adolf Fredrik Munck (1749–1831), Swedish and Finnish noble during the Gustavian era
- Bror Munck (born 1857) (1857–1935), officer of the Swedish Army, became lieutenant-general
- Charlotte Munck (nurse) (1876–1932), notable for her role in The Danish Nurses' Organization, a trade union
- Charlotte Munck (actress) (born 1969), Danish actress, starred in the Danish police television drama Anna Pihl as the title character
- Ebba Munck af Fulkila (1858–1946), Swedish noble, lady in waiting and a titular princess, the spouse of Prince Oscar Bernadotte
- Ernest de Munck (1840–1915), Belgian cellist and composer
- Frans de Munck (1922–2010), Dutch footballer and football manager
- Gerardo L. Munck, Argentine by birth, professor of international relations in the University of Southern California
- Gerda Munck (1901–1986), Danish fencer
- Jens Munck (1579–1628), Dano-Norwegian navigator and explorer born in Norway
- Johan Munck (born 1943), Swedish lawyer and former president of the Supreme Court of Sweden
- Joseph de Munck, Belgian Catholic Priest of the Redemptorist Order
- Kaj Munck (1898–1944), Danish playwright and Lutheran pastor, martyred during the Occupation of Denmark of World War II
- Noah Munck (born 1996), American actor and trap/electronica producer
- Oskar A. Munck (1928–2017), Norwegian businessperson
- Ronaldo Munck, Argentine professor of sociology at Dublin City University (DCU)
- Svend Munck (1899–1974), Danish fencer
- Sverre Munck (1898–1970), Norwegian businessperson

== See also ==
- Munck Cranes (Sverre Munck A/S) was founded on 25 October 1924 by Mr. Sverre Munck
- Muck (disambiguation)
- Munchkin
- Munk
