= Sigurður Egill Lárusson =

Icelandic footballer

Sigurður Lárusson
Personal information
- Full name: Sigurður Egill Lárusson
- Date of birth: 22 January 1992 (age 34)
- Place of birth: Iceland
- Height: 1.82 m (6 ft 0 in)
- Position: Midfielder

Team information
- Current team: Þróttur
- Number: 10

Youth career
- Víkingur

Senior career*
Years	Team	Apps	(Gls)
2009–2013	Víkingur	84	(19)
2013–2025	Valur	261	(48)
2026–	Þróttur	18	(8)

International career^{‡}
2008	Iceland U-17	6	(0)
2009–2010	Iceland U-19	11	(0)
2014	Iceland U-21	1	(0)
2017–	Iceland	2	(0)
- * Club domestic league appearances and goals as of 14 October 2026 ‡ National team caps and goals as of 8 February 2017

Sigurður Egill Lárusson (born 22 January 1992) is an Icelandic football midfielder, who currently plays for Þróttur. He is the brother of Dóra María Lárusdóttir.

== International career ==
Sigurður has been involved with the U-17, U-19 and U-21 teams, and made his senior team debut against Chile at the 2017 China Cup.
