= Ágúst Gylfason =

Icelandic footballer and manager

Personal information
- Full name: Ágúst Þór Gylfason
- Date of birth: 1 August 1971 (age 55)
- Place of birth: Iceland
- Height: 1.80 m (5 ft 11 in)
- Position: Midfielder

Senior career*
Years	Team	Apps	(Gls)
1990–1994	Valur	71	(7)
1995–1998	SK Brann	77	(4)
1999–2003	Fram Reykjavik	63	(21)
2004–2007	KR Reykjavik	41	(4)
2008–2009	Fjölnir	20	(1)

International career
1991–1993	Iceland U21	13	(0)
1993–1996	Iceland	6	(0)

Managerial career
- 2010–2011: Björninn
- 2012–2017: Fjölnir
- 2018–2019: Breiðablik
- 2020–2021: Grótta
- 2022–2023: Stjarnan
- 2025: Leiknir Reykjavík
- * Club domestic league appearances and goals

Ágúst Þór Gylfason (born 1 August 1971) is an Icelandic football manager and a former player. He was manager of Breiðablik until 2019, when he became manager of Grótta's men's football team.

== Club career ==
Ágúst started his career at Valur before moving to SK Brann in Norway. He returned to Iceland after three years to play for Fram.

While playing for Valur, he worked as a carpenter and studied business administration. He was also married and had a son in early 1994. Ágúst came on trial in November 1994 together with Geoff Aunger. Brann's Anders Giske travelled to Iceland to negotiate a transfer with Valur. The deal included stipulation of a free transfer to an Icelandic club if Ágúst could not adapt to Norway. The personal contract was ready and signed on 4 January 1995.

After Ágúst's time in Brann had run its course, he had a trial with Tranmere Rovers in 1998. Reportedly, he also visited Brentford, where owner Ron Noades came to personally pick him up at the airport.

== International career ==
Ágúst made his debut for Iceland in an April 1993 friendly match against the United States, coming on as a late substitute for Arnar Grétarsson. He earned his sixth and last cap facing Ireland in a November 1996 qualifier for the 1998 World Cup.
