= N1 (company) =

N1 hf.
- Company type: Hlutafélag
- Industry: Retail
- Founded: April 13, 2007; 19 years ago
- Headquarters: Dalvegur 10-14, Kópavogur, Iceland
- Number of locations: 159 (2025)
- Area served: Iceland
- Revenue: ▼ISK 33.77 billion (2016)
- Operating income: ▲ISK 4,18 billion (2016)
- Total assets: ▲ISK 2,56 billion (2016)
- Total equity: ▲ISK 12,57 billion (2016)
- Number of employees: 532 (2016)
- Website: www.n1.is/en

N1 hf. (Nasdaq Iceland: N1) is an Icelandic company headquartered in Kópavogur that sells fuel and car related products as well as electricity to individuals and companies.

== History ==
N1 was founded on April 13, 2007, by a merger between the Icelandic companies Esso and Bílanaust. The merger brought with it a change of focus for the companies, away from selling gas and towards retail. At the time of its founding, it became the 10th largest company in Iceland.
