= Kristinn Freyr Sigurðsson =

Icelandic footballer

Personal information
- Full name: Kristinn Freyr Sigurðsson
- Date of birth: 25 December 1991 (age 34)
- Place of birth: Reykjavík, Iceland
- Height: 1.80 m (5 ft 11 in)
- Position: Attacking midfielder

Team information
- Current team: Afturelding
- Number: 7

Youth career
- –2005: Afturelding
- 2005–2007: Fjölnir

Senior career*
Years	Team	Apps	(Gls)
2007–2008	Fjölnir	1	(0)
2008–2009	Stjarnan	0	(0)
2009–2012	Fjölnir	51	(5)
2012–2016	Valur	103	(24)
2017	Sundsvall	27	(1)
2018–2022	Valur	77	(15)
2022	FH	24	(3)
2023–2026	Valur	67	(5)
2026–	Afturelding	7	(0)

International career^{‡}
2007	Iceland U17	2	(0)
2008–2009	Iceland U19	4	(0)
2017–	Iceland	1	(0)
- * Club domestic league appearances and goals as of 12 September 2026 ‡ National team caps and goals as of 8 November 2017

Kristinn Freyr Sigurðsson (born 25 December 1991) is an Icelandic football attacking midfielder, who plays for Afturelding.

== Club career ==
Kristinn started his career with local club Fjölnir before signing with Valur at 21 years old. In the 2016 season, he was named Players' Player of the Year in the Icelandic league, Úrvalsdeild.

In 2017, he signed with GIF Sundsvall in the Swedish Allsvenskan. He played 27 league games, scoring once, before leaving by mutual consent at the end of the season.

In the winter of 2022 it was announced thak Kristinn would be joining Icelandic giants Valur for the third time in his career.
