= Ólafur Kristjánsson =

Icelandic footballer and manager (born 1968)

Personal information
- Full name: Ólafur Helgi Kristjánsson
- Date of birth: 20 May 1968 (age 58)
- Place of birth: Reykjavík, Iceland
- Height: 1.83 m (6 ft 0 in)
- Position: Defender

Youth career
- 1979–1984: FH

Senior career*
Years	Team	Apps	(Gls)
1985–1995	FH	149	(9)
1996–1997	KR	30	(0)
1997–2001	AGF Aarhus	65	(1)
Total		234	(10)

International career
1985	Iceland U19	5	(0)
1988–1989	Iceland U21	7	(0)
1990–1996	Iceland	14	(0)

Managerial career
- 2002–2004: AGF Aarhus (assistant)
- 2004–2005: Fram Reykjavík
- 2006–2014: Breiðablik
- 2014–2015: FC Nordsjælland
- 2016–2017: Randers FC
- 2018–2020: FH
- 2020–2021: Esbjerg fB
- * Club domestic league appearances and goals

Ólafur Helgi Kristjánsson (born 20 May 1968) is an Icelandic football manager and former player, who most recently managed Danish club Esbjerg fB.

== Playing career ==
Kristjánsson started his playing career at FH Hafnarfjörður, before moving to KR Reykjavík in 1996. In 1996, he moved to Danish side AGF Aarhus. He retired in 2001 and became a youth coach at the team, and later assistant manager.

== Managerial career ==
Kristjánsson took charge of Icelandic premier league team Fram on 30 June 2004, replacing Ion Geolgău. The club was bottom of the league when Kristjánsson took over, but eventually the club managed to avoid relegation. Kristjánsson was in charge again for the 2005 season, but left the club after relegation.

On 6 July 2006, Kristjánsson was appointed manager of Breiðablik UBK, finishing the season in 5th place. Over the next few years the club went to become a regular title contender. In 2009 the club won its first big title in history with a win in the Icelandic Cup. The following year the team won the Icelandic Premier League for the first time.

In April 2014 it was announced that Kristjánsson would take over as head coach of FC Nordsjælland in July 2014. He led the club to a 6th place in his first season as manager. On 15 December he was sacked following a takeover of the club.

In the summer of 2016 he became new manager of Randers FC in the Danish Superliga. He managed the club until October 2017, when he left by mutual consent.

== Managerial statistics ==
As of 10 May 2021

Includes games played in Icelandic Premier League, Icelandic Cup, Icelandic League Cup, Icelandic Super Cup, Europa League and Champions League.

Team	From	To	Record								
Team	From	To	M	W	D	L	GF	GA	GD	Win %	Sources
Fram Reykjavik	30 June 2004	10 October 2005	41	13	8	20	46	62	−16	31.71	
Breiðablik	6 July 2006	2 June 2014	255	126	58	71	466	337	+129	49.41	
Nordsjælland	1 July 2014	15 December 2015	52	20	6	26	57	72	−15	38.46	
Randers	1 July 2016	5 October 2017	48	15	13	20	47	52	−5	31.25	
FH Hafnarfjörður	14 October 2017	15 July 2020	73	37	16	20	133	102	+31	50.68	
Esbjerg	16 July 2020	10 May 2021	32	19	4	9	49	32	+17	59.38	
Total			501	230	105	166	798	658	+140	45.91	

== Honours ==
=== Manager ===
Breiðablik UBK

- Úrvalsdeild (1): 2010
- Icelandic Cup (1): 2009
- Icelandic League Cup (1): 2013
