= Stjarnan (men's football) =

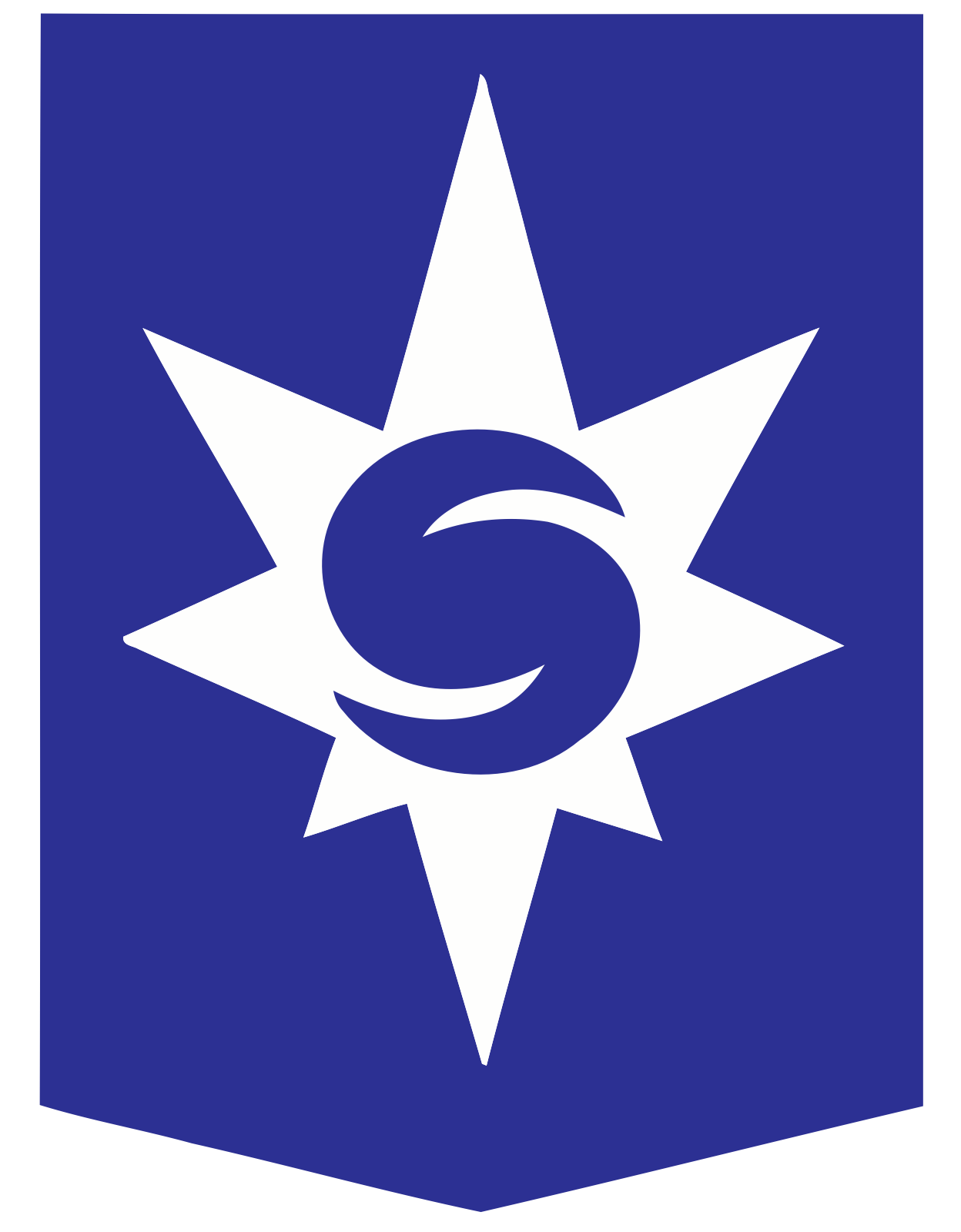
- Full name: Ungmennafélag Stjarnan
- Founded: 1960; 66 years ago
- Ground: Samsung völlurinn
- Capacity: 1,298
- Chairman: Jóhann Ingimundarson
- Head coach: Jökull I Elísabetarson
- League: Besta deild karla
- 2026: Besta deild karla, 7th of 12
- Website: stjarnan.is/knattspyrnudeild/
Home colours	Away colours

Stjarnan (lit. 'The Star') is the men's football department of the Ungmennafélagið Stjarnan multi-sport club. It is based in Garðabær, Iceland, and currently plays in the Besta deild karla, the top-tier men's football league in Iceland.

== History ==
The association was founded in 1960. The men's division played in 1980 in the first Icelandic League (then Landsbankadeild) and managed the 2000 promotion again to the highest Icelandic league. In 2008 men's reached the summit and thus to play in Úrvalsdeild since 2009.

The club gained worldwide fame when their elaborate goal celebrations, including highly choreographed depictions of landing a fish, diving, a human toilet, a human bicycle, and a Rambo shooting spree, were published widely across the Internet and football television shows.

On October 4, 2014, Stjarnan won their first ever Úrvalsdeild karla title. Stjarnan went through the season unbeaten in the league and equalled the point record of 52 points.

In the 2014–15 Europa League, they reached the play-off rounds after beating Scottish club Motherwell and Polish team Lech Poznań, before Italian giants Inter Milan denied them a place in the group stages.

On 18 April 2019, Stjarnan won the Super Cup for the second time in its history, beating Valur 6–5 in penalties.

== Current squad ==
As of 15 August 2026

Note: Flags indicate national team as defined under FIFA eligibility rules; some limited exceptions apply. Players may hold more than one non-FIFA nationality.

No.	Pos.	Nation	Player
1	GK	ISL	Darri Bergmann Gylfason
2	DF	ISL	Heidar Aegisson
3	DF	DEN	Gustav Kjeldsen
4	DF	ISL	Þórri Mar Þórisson
5	DF	ISL	Guðmundur Kristjánsson
6	DF	ISL	Sindri Þór Ingimarsson
7	FW	ISL	Örvar Eggertsson
8	MF	ISL	Jóhann Árni Gunnarsson
10	MF	ISL	Daníel Finns Matthíasson
11	FW	ISL	Birnir Snær Ingason
12	GK	ISL	Árni Snær Ólafsson
14	DF	ISL	Bjarki Hauksson
18	MF	ISL	Guðmundur Baldvin Nökkvason

No.	Pos.	Nation	Player
19	DF	ISL	Ari Leifsson
21	MF	SLE	Ibrahim Turay
22	FW	ISL	Emil Atlason
23	MF	ISL	Benedikt Warén
24	DF	ISL	Sigurður Gunnar Jónsson
25	DF	ISL	Christian Alexandersson
27	DF	SUR	Damil Dankerlui
29	MF	ISL	Alex Þór Hauksson
32	DF	ISL	Örvar Logi Örvarsson
94	FW	ISL	Árni Vilhjálmsson
95	GK	ISL	Sveinn Sigurdur Jóhannesson
99	FW	ISL	Andri Rúnar Bjarnason

=== Out on loan ===
Note: Flags indicate national team as defined under FIFA eligibility rules; some limited exceptions apply. Players may hold more than one non-FIFA nationality.

No.	Pos.	Nation	Player
—	GK	ISL	Aron Dagur Birnuson (at Þróttur)
17	FW	ISL	Haukur Örn Brink (at Afturelding)

No.	Pos.	Nation	Player
20	FW	SLE	Alpha Conteh (at Keflavík)

== Coaches ==
- (Iceland) Ólafur Þór Guðbjörnsson (interim) (1 Jan 2010 – 31 Dec 2010)
- (Iceland) Bjarni Jóhannsson (1 Jan 2010 – 31 Dec 2012)
- (Iceland) Logi Ólafsson (1 Jan 2013 – 16 Oct 2013)
- (Iceland) Rúnar Páll Sigmundsson (1 Jan 2014 – 6 May 2021)
- (Iceland) Þorvaldur Örlygsson (6 May 2021 – )

== Honours ==
- Úrvalsdeild karla
  - Champions: 2014
  - Runners-up: 2016
- 1. deild karla
  - Champions: 1989
- Icelandic Cup
  - Champions: 2018
  - Runners-up: 2012, 2013
- Icelandic Super Cup
  - Champions: 2015, 2019

== European record ==
Season	Competition	Round	Opponent	Home	Away	Aggregate
2014–15	UEFA Europa League	1Q	(Wales) Bangor City	4–0	4–0	8–0
2014–15	UEFA Europa League	2Q	(Scotland) Motherwell	3–2 (a.e.t.)	2–2	5–4
2014–15	UEFA Europa League	3Q	(Poland) Lech Poznań	1–0	0–0	1–0
2014–15	UEFA Europa League	PO	(Italy) Inter Milan	0–3	0–6	0–9
2015–16	UEFA Champions League	2Q	(Scotland) Celtic	1–4	0–2	1–6
2017–18	UEFA Europa League	1Q	(Republic of Ireland) Shamrock Rovers	0–1	0–1	0–2
2018–19	UEFA Europa League	1Q	(Estonia) Nõmme Kalju	3–0	0–1	3–1
2018–19	UEFA Europa League	2Q	(Denmark) Copenhagen	0–2	0–5	0–7
2019–20	UEFA Europa League	1Q	(Estonia) FCI Levadia	2–1	2–3	4–4 (a)
2019–20	UEFA Europa League	2Q	(Spain) Espanyol	1–3	0–4	1–7
2021–22	UEFA Europa Conference League	1Q	(Republic of Ireland) Bohemians	1–1	0–3	1–4
2024–25	UEFA Conference League	1Q	(Northern Ireland) Linfield	2–0	2–3	4–3
2024–25	UEFA Conference League	2Q	(Estonia) Paide Linnameeskond	2–1	0–4	2–5
2026–27	UEFA Conference League	1Q	(Faroe Islands) Víkingur	3–1	2–2	5–3
2026–27	UEFA Conference League	2Q	(Finland) Ilves	1–0	1–2 (a.e.t.)	2–2 (4–5 p)

Notes

- 1Q: First qualifying round
- 2Q: Second qualifying round
- 3Q: Third qualifying round
- PO: Play-off round
