= Hlíðarendi (stadium) =

Multi-purpose stadium in Reykjavík, Iceland

Valsvöllur
- "Valsheimilið" (Valur's Home)
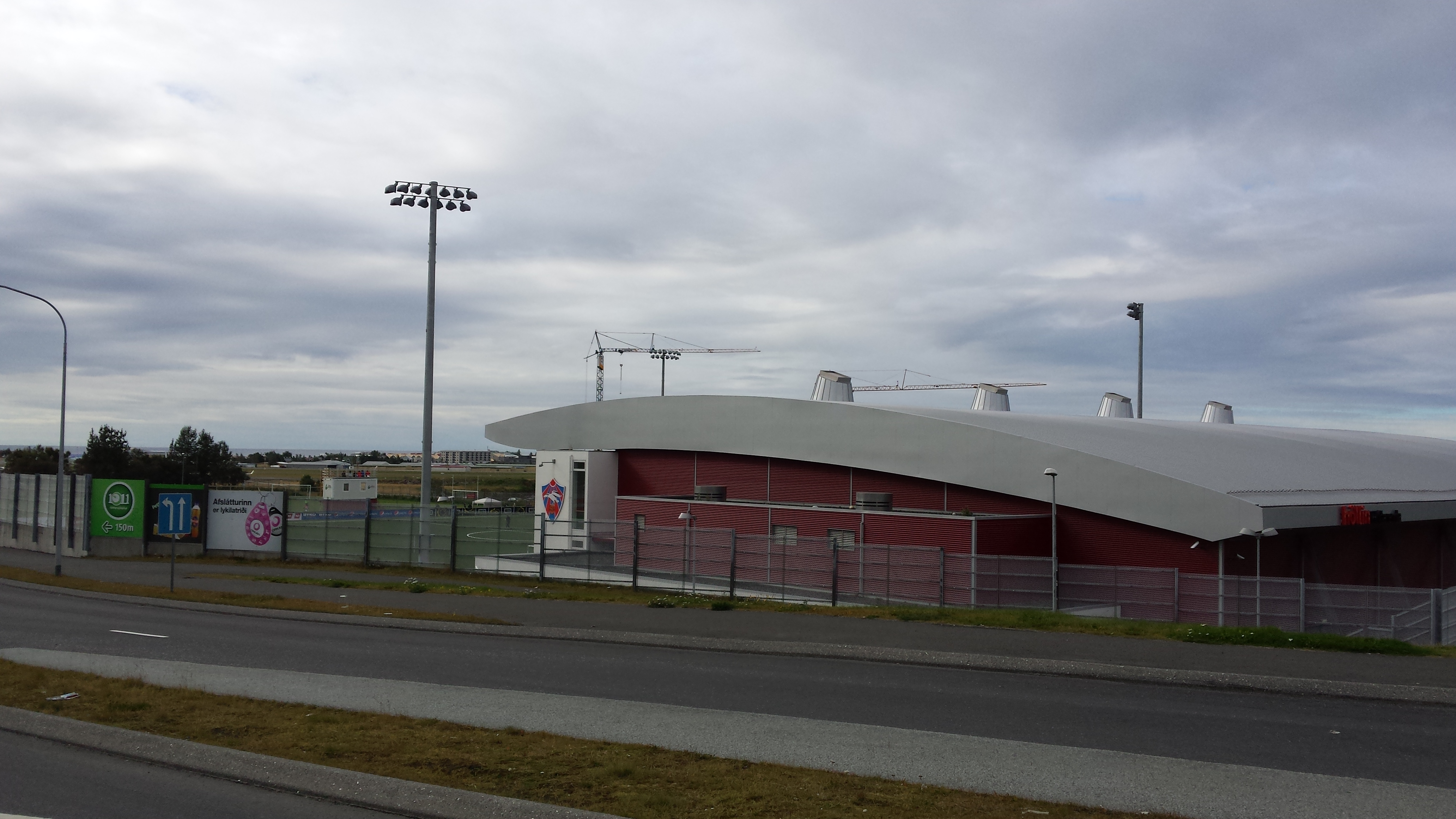
- Hlíðarendi stadium in Reykjavík
- Interactive map of Valsvöllur
- Former names: Vodafonevöllurinn (2007-2015)
- Location: Reykjavík, Iceland
- Coordinates: 64°07′58″N 21°55′25″W
- Owner: Valur
- Operator: Valur
- Capacity: Football: 1,524; Basketball/Handball: 1,300

Construction
- Groundbreaking: 2004
- Opened: 7 September 2007 (Indoor); 25 May 2008 (Outdoor)

Tenants
- Valur (men's football); Valur women's football; Valur men's basketball; Valur women's basketball; Valur men's handball; Valur women's handball; KH

Valsvöllur (lit. 'Valur Field' or more precisely 'Valur Stadium'), also known as Hlíðarendi (Icelandic pronunciation: [ˈl̥iːðarˌɛntɪ]; named after the street with the same name, which means "slope's end") and formerly Vodafonevöllurinn (lit. 'Vodafone Field' (Note: völlurinn is the definite form of völlur, meaning "the field".) or 'Vodafone Stadium'), is a multi-purpose stadium in Reykjavík, Iceland. It is the home-court of Valur's football, basketball and handball teams. The football stadium holds 2,465 people, including 1,201 in seats. The indoor court holds 1,300 people in seats.

The stadium broke ground in 2004 and the indoor stadium was formally opened on 7 September 2007 while the outdoor football stadium was formally opened on 25 May 2008. It bore the name of Vodafone from 2007 until 2015. In June 2018 the club signed a five-year sponsorship deal with Origo which saw the football stadium being renamed Origovöllurinn and the handball/basketball stadium being renamed Origo-höllin (Origo arena).

In January 2024 Valur and N1 signed a 5 year sponsorship deal with the clubs football stadium and basketball/handball indoor stadium being named the N1 Völlurinn, and N1 höllin respectively.
