= Haukur Páll Sigurðsson =

Icelandic footballer

Personal information
- Date of birth: 5 August 1987 (age 39)
- Height: 1.76 m (5 ft 9 in)
- Position: Midfielder

Senior career*
Years	Team	Apps	(Gls)
2004–2009	Þróttur	73	(12)
2009	Alta	10	(0)
2010–2023	Valur	249	(31)

International career
2012–2014	Iceland	2	(0)
- * Club domestic league appearances and goals

Haukur Páll Sigurðsson (born 5 August 1987) is an Icelandic former footballer who played as a left back.

== Club career ==
Haukur has played club football in Iceland and Norway for Þróttur, Alta and Valur. He signed with Valur in 2010. In 2020, he won the Icelandic championship for the third time.

On 1 August 2023 Haukur played his 245th game for Valur, becoming the player with the most games in Icelandic top flight for the club.

== International career ==
He made his international debut for Iceland in 2012.
