= Hilmar Árni Halldórsson =

Icelandic footballer

Personal information
- Full name: Hilmar Árni Halldórsson
- Date of birth: 14 February 1992 (age 34)
- Place of birth: Iceland
- Height: 1.80 m (5 ft 11 in)
- Position: Forward

Team information
- Current team: Stjarnan
- Number: 10

Youth career
- Leiknir

Senior career*
Years	Team	Apps	(Gls)
2008–2015	Leiknir	138	(31)
2016–	Stjarnan	170	(66)

International career^{‡}
2010	Iceland U-19	3	(0)
2018–	Iceland	4	(0)
- * Club domestic league appearances and goals as of 2 November 2024 ‡ National team caps and goals as of 30 January 2019

Hilmar Árni Halldórsson (born 14 February 1992) is an Icelandic football forward, who currently plays for Stjarnan.

== International career ==
Hilmar was involved with the U-19 team, and made his senior team debut in an unofficial friendly against Indonesia on 14 January 2018.
