= 2017 Stjarnan season =

Stjarnan
2017 season
- Manager: Rúnar Páll Sigmundsson
- Stadium: Samsungvöllur
- Úrvalsdeild: 2nd
- Icelandic Cup: Semi-final vs ÍBV
- Deildabikar: Group Stage
- UEFA Europa League: First qualifying round vs Shamrock Rovers
- Top goalscorer: League: Guðjón Baldvinsson (12); All: Hilmar Árni Halldórsson (16)
Home colours	Away colours

Stjarnan is an Icelandic sports club specialising in football located in Garðabær.During the 2017 campaign they will be competing in the following competitions: Úrvalsdeild, Icelandic Cup, Icelandic League Cup.

== Squad ==
As of 24 April 2017

Note: Flags indicate national team as defined under FIFA eligibility rules; some limited exceptions apply. Players may hold more than one non-FIFA nationality.

No.	Pos.	Nation	Player
1	GK	ISL	Haraldur Björnsson
2	DF	ISL	Brynjar Gauti Guðjónsson
3	DF	ISL	Jósef Kristinn Jósefsson
4	DF	ISL	Jóhann Laxdal
5	DF	ISL	Óttar Bjarni Guðmundsson
6	MF	ISL	Þorri Geir Rúnarsson
7	FW	ISL	Guðjón Baldvinsson
8	MF	ISL	Baldur Sigurðsson
9	DF	ISL	Daníel Laxdal
10	MF	ISL	Hilmar Árni Halldórsson
11	FW	ISL	Arnar Már Björgvinsson
12	DF	ISL	Heiðar Ægisson
14	DF	ISL	Hörður Árnason

No.	Pos.	Nation	Player
16	FW	ISL	Ævar Ingi Jóhannesson
17	FW	ISL	Ólafur Karl Finsen
18	FW	ISL	Jón Arnar Barðdal
19	FW	ISL	Hólmbert Friðjónsson
20	MF	ISL	Eyjólfur Héðinsson
22	MF	ISL	Þórhallur Kári Knútsson
23	MF	ISL	Dagur Austmann Hilmarsson
25	GK	ISL	Sveinn Sigurður Jóhannesson
26	FW	ISL	Kristófer Konráðsson
27	MF	ISL	Máni Austmann Hilmarsson
29	DF	ISL	Alex Þór Hauksson
30	MF	ISL	Kári Pétursson
33	MF	ISL	Ágúst Leó Björnsson

== Competitions ==
=== Úrvalsdeild ===
==== League table ====
Pos	Team	Pld	W	D	L	GF	GA	GD	Pts	Qualification or relegation
1	Valur (C)	22	15	5	2	43	20	+23	50	Qualification for the Champions League first qualifying round
2	Stjarnan	22	10	8	4	46	25	+21	38	Qualification for the Europa League first qualifying round
3	FH	22	9	8	5	33	25	+8	35	Qualification for the Europa League first qualifying round
4	KR	22	8	7	7	31	29	+2	31	
5	Grindavík	22	9	4	9	31	39	−8	31	
6	Breiðablik	22	9	3	10	34	35	−1	30	
7	KA	22	7	8	7	37	31	+6	29	
8	Víkingur R.	22	7	6	9	32	36	−4	27	
9	ÍBV	22	7	4	11	32	38	−6	25	Qualification for the Europa League first qualifying round (Note: ÍBV qualified for the Europa League first qualifying round by winning the 2017 Icelandic Cup.)
10	Fjölnir	22	6	7	9	32	40	−8	25	
11	Víkingur Ó. (R)	22	6	4	12	24	44	−20	22	Relegation to 1. deild karla
12	ÍA (R)	22	3	8	11	28	41	−13	17	Relegation to 1. deild karla

Source: KSÍ (in Icelandic), Soccerway
Rules for classification: 1) Points; 2) Goal difference; 3) Goals scored; 4) Head-to-head points; 5) Head-to-head goal difference; 6) Head-to-head goals scored; 7) Head-to-head away goals scored; 8) Play-off (only for deciding champion); 9) Draw.
(C) Champions; (R) Relegated

==== Results summary ====
Overall								Home						Away					
Pld	W	D	L	GF	GA	GD	Pts	W	D	L	GF	GA	GD	W	D	L	GF	GA	GD
22	10	8	4	46	25	+21	38	7	2	2	28	8	+20	3	6	2	18	17	+1

Last updated: 30 September 2017.
Source: #Results

==== Results by matchday ====
Matchday	1	2	3	4	5	6	7	8	9	10	11	12	13	14	15	16	17	18	19	20	21	22
Ground	A	H	A	H	A	A	H	A	H	A	H	H	A	H	A	H	H	A	H	A	H	A
Result	D	W	W	W	W	L	L	L	D	D	W	W	D	W	D	W	D	D	W	D	L	W
Position	3	1	1	1	1	1	3	3	3	4	3	2	2	2	2	2	2	2	2	2	2	2

Updated to match(es) played on 30 September 2017. Source: Results
A = Away; H = Home; W = Win; D = Draw; L = Loss

==== Results ====
1 May 2017 1	Grindavík	2 – 2	Stjarnan	Grindavík
20:15 WET (UTC)	Hewson (yellow card) 24'; A.V.Þórarinsson 30' (pen.) (yellow card) 53'; M.Björgvinsson 45+1'; B.Á.Guðmundsson (yellow card) 64'; Žeravica (yellow card) 83'; G.Þorsteinsson (yellow card) 84'	Report	Sigurðsson 41'; D.Laxdal 83'	Stadium: Grindavíkurvöllur; Attendance: 763; Referee: Guðmundur Ársæll Guðmundsson

7 May 2017 2	Stjarnan	5 – 0	IBV	Garðabær
17:00 WET (UTC)	Friðjónsson 6' (pen.), 45'; J.K.Jósefsson 24'; M.A.Hilmarsson (yellow card) 53'; H.Á.Halldórsson 70'; Baldvinsson 90+2'	Report	Carrillo (yellow card) 6'; F.Ö.Friðriksson (yellow card) 35'; Pepa (yellow card) 62'	Stadium: Samsungvöllur; Attendance: 1,106; Referee: Ívar Orri Kristjánsson

14 May 2017 3	Breiðablik	1 – 3	Stjarnan	Kópavogur
20:00 WET (UTC)	M.Efete (yellow card) 62'; A.Bjarnason 72'; H.Gunnlaugsson (yellow card) 87'	Report	B.G.Guðjónsson 57'; Baldvinsson (yellow card) 60' (goal) 62'; H.Á.Halldórsson 90+4'	Stadium: Kópavogsvöllur; Attendance: 1,392; Referee: Thorvaldur Arnason

21 May 2017 4	Stjarnan	2 – 1	KA	Garðabær
20:00 WET (UTC)	Baldvinsson 22'; A.Þ.Hauksson (yellow card) 49'; Héðinsson 90+6'	Report	Nkumu (yellow card) 30'; Á.Sigurgeirsson 42'; Ó.A.Pétursson (yellow card) 74'; Trninić (yellow card) 76'	Stadium: Samsungvöllur; Attendance: 1,356; Referee: Vilhjálmur Alvar Thórarinsson

28 May 2017 5	Fjölnir	1 – 3	Stjarnan	Reykjavík
19:15 WET (UTC)	Tasković (yellow card) 60'; Solberg 76'; Tadejević (yellow card) 83'; Jugović (yellow card) 89'	Report	Baldvinsson 4'; Friðjónsson 57', 62'	Stadium: Fjölnisvöllur; Attendance: 1,077; Referee: Ivar Orri Kristjánsson

4 June 2017 6	FH	3 – 0	Stjarnan	Hafnarfjörður
20:00 WET (UTC)	Viðarsson (yellow card) 16'; Lennon 23'; Finnbogason 63'; Valdimarsson 81'; Doumbia (yellow card) 88'; Crawford (yellow card) 90+3'	Report	J.Laxdal (yellow card) 22'; B.G.Guðjónsson (yellow card) 74'; A.Þ.Hauksson (yellow card) 90'	Stadium: Kaplakriki; Attendance: 2,036; Referee: Thoroddur Hjaltalin

15 June 2017 7	Stjarnan	1 – 2	Vikingur Reykjavik	Garðabær
20:00 WET (UTC)	D.Laxdal 16'	Report	A.F.Hilmarsson 15' (yellow card) 60'; A.I.Kristinsson (yellow card) 37'; Tufegdžić (yellow card) 45'; R.B.Sveinsson 73'; Lowing (yellow card) 82'	Stadium: Samsungvöllur; Attendance: 730; Referee: Ivar Kristjánsson

19 June 2017 8	Víkingur Ólafsvík	2 – 1	Stjarnan	Ólafsvík
19:15 WET (UTC)	E.Kwakwa (yellow card) 8'; K.Turudija (yellow card) 15'; K.Quee 16'; G.S.Hafsteinsson 49'; A.S.Gonzalez (yellow card) 79'	Report	H.Á.Halldórsson 85' (pen.)	Stadium: Ólafsvíkurvöllur; Attendance: 465; Referee: Vilhjálmur Alvar Thórarinsson

24 June 2017 9	Stjarnan	2 – 2	ÍA	Garðabær
17:00 WET (UTC)	Baldvinsson 22'; H.A.Halldórsson 49'; A.Þ.Hauksson (yellow card) 50'	Report	Haraldsson 43'; A.M.Guðjónsson (yellow card) 64' (goal) 84'; A.S.Guðmundsson (yellow card) 68'; S.Þorsteinsson (yellow card) 81'	Stadium: Samsungvöllur; Attendance: 684; Referee: Gunnar Jónsson

9 July 2017 10	Valur	1 – 1	Stjarnan	Reykjavík
20:00 WET (UTC)	E.K.Ingvarsson (yellow card) 43'; Eiríksson 70' (yellow card) 88'; K.I.Halldórsson (yellow card) 78'; A.S.Geirsson (yellow card) 90+3'	Report	Sigurðsson (yellow card) 45+1'; Friðjónsson 45+4'	Stadium: Hlíðarendi; Attendance: 1,167; Referee: Vilhjalmur Alvar Thórarinsson

16 July 2017 11	Stjarnan	2 – 0	KR	Garðabær
19:15 WET (UTC)	Friðjónsson 35'; B.G.Guðjónsson 81'	Report	Hauksson (yellow card) 32'; Friðgeirsson (yellow card) 90+1'	Stadium: Samsungvöllur; Attendance: 1,150; Referee: Gunnar Jónsson

23 July 2017 12	Stjarnan	5 – 0	Grindavík	Garðabær
21:00 WET (UTC)	Sigurðsson 1'; Baldvinsson 52', 58', 64' (pen.); H.Á.Halldórsson 77'	Report	B.Á.Guðmundsson (yellow card) 46'	Stadium: Samsungvöllur; Attendance: 706; Referee: Vilhjálmur Alvar Thórarinsson

30 July 2017 13	IBV	2 – 2	Stjarnan	Vestmannaeyjar
17:00 WET (UTC)	Maigaard 13'; McLean (yellow card) 17'; Þorvaldsson 22' (pen.); S.S.Magnússon (yellow card) 71'; Carrillo (yellow card) 73'	Report	H.Á.Halldórsson 18' (pen.); Héðinsson (yellow card) 28' (yellow-red card) 48'; Baldvinsson 73' (yellow card) 74'	Stadium: Hásteinsvöllur; Attendance: 709; Referee: Ívar Orri Kristjánsson

9 August 2017 14	Stjarnan	2 – 0	Breiðablik	Garðabær
21:00 WET (UTC)	Friðjónsson 46'; H.Á.Halldórsson 67'; A.Þ.Hauksson (yellow card) 88'	Report	A.A.Atlason (yellow card) 14'; Helgason (yellow card) 23'	Stadium: Samsungvöllur; Attendance: 1,163; Referee: Thoroddur Hjaltalin

14 August 2017 15	KA	1 – 1	Stjarnan	Akureyri
18:00 WET (UTC)	Lyng (yellow card) 37'; Á.Sigurgeirsson 41'; Trninić (red card) 50'; C.Williams (yellow card) 77'; Þorsteinsson (yellow card) 90'	Report	Friðjónsson (yellow card) 38' (yellow-red card) 90+6'; Ó.B.Guðmundsson (yellow card) 80'; J.K.Jósefsson 86'; Héðinsson (yellow card) 90+8'	Stadium: Akureyrarvöllur; Attendance: 915; Referee: Erlendur Eiriksson

21 August 2017 16	Stjarnan	4 – 0	Fjölnir	Garðabær
19:15 WET (UTC)	H.Á.Halldórsson 15' (pen.); Laxdal (yellow card) 28' (goal) 73'; Finsen 36'; Baldvinsson 76'	Report	L.Olsson (yellow card) 14'; Solberg (yellow card) 88'	Stadium: Samsungvöllur; Attendance: 706; Referee: Thorvaldur Arnason

27 August 2017 17	Stjarnan	1 – 1	FH	Garðabær
19:15 WET (UTC)	Sigurðsson (yellow card) 82'; Friðjónsson 90'; Laxdal (yellow card) 90'	Report	Crawford (yellow card) 30'; A.Þ.Hauksson 45+1' (o.g.); Doumbia (yellow card) 50'; G.K.Guðmundsson (yellow card) 55'; P.Viðarsson (yellow card) 75' (yellow-red card) 90+5'; Valdimarsson (yellow card) 82'; J.Jónsson (yellow card) 90+5'	Stadium: Samsungvöllur; Attendance: 1,490; Referee: Vilhjálmur Alvar Thórarinsson

10 September 2017 18	Vikingur Reykjavik	2 – 2	Stjarnan	Reykjavík
18:00 WET (UTC)	A.I.Kristinsson (yellow card) 25'; Ožegović 34'; Í.Ö.Jónsson 47'	Report	Friðjónsson 12'; J.K.Jósefsson (yellow card) 69'; Jóhannesson 90+5'	Stadium: Víkin; Referee: Gunnar Jónsson

14 September 2017 19	Stjarnan	3 – 2	Víkingur Ólafsvík	Garðabær
19:15 WET (UTC)	H.Á.Halldórsson 33'; Friðjónsson 75'; Baldvinsson 77'	Report		Stadium: Samsungvöllur; Attendance: 561; Referee: Thoruddur Hjaltalin

17 September 2017 20	ÍA	2 – 2	Stjarnan	Akranes
16:00 WET (UTC)	A.M.Guðjónsson 1'; S.Þorsteinsson 88'	Report	Baldvinsson 10'; B.G.Guðjónsson (yellow card) 58'; Friðjónsson 59'	Stadium: Akranesvöllur; Attendance: 527; Referee: Thorvaldur Arnason

24 September 2017 21	Stjarnan	1 – 2	Valur	Garðabær
16:00 WET (UTC)	D.Laxdal (yellow card) 39'; H.Á.Halldórsson 90+2'	Report	Eiríksson 20'; Lýðsson 40' (pen.); S.Björnsson (yellow card) 61'	Stadium: Samsungvöllur; Attendance: 833; Referee: Helgi Jónasson

30 September 2017 22	KR	0 – 1	Stjarnan	Reykjavík
14:00 WET (UTC)	A.B.Josepsson (yellow card) 51'	Report	J.K.Jósefsson 15'; Laxdal (yellow card) 45'	Stadium: Alvogen Völlurinn; Attendance: 488; Referee: Ivar Orri Kristjánsson

=== Icelandic League Cup ===
==== Group stage ====
Pos	Team	Pld	W	D	L	GF	GA	GD	Pts	Qualification
1	Breiðablik	5	3	2	0	12	1	+11	11	Qualification for the Quarter finals
2	Grindavík	5	3	2	0	14	6	+8	11	Qualification for the Quarter finals
3	Stjarnan	5	3	2	0	8	4	+4	11	
4	Þróttur R.	5	2	0	3	12	12	0	6	
5	Fram	5	0	1	4	8	13	−5	1	
6	Leiknir F.	5	0	1	4	4	22	−18	1	

Updated to match(es) played on 2 April 2017. Source: ksí.is

18 February 2017 1	Breiðablik	0 – 0	Stjarnan	Kópavogur
12:00 WET (UTC)	A.K.Aðalsteinsson (red card) 11'	Report	Laxdal (yellow card) 45+1'; Friðjónsson (yellow card) 71'; A.Þ.Hauksson (yellow card) 82'	Stadium: Kópavogsvöllur; Referee: Ivar Orri Kristjánsson

28 February 2017 2	Stjarnan	3 – 1	Þróttur	Kópavogur
20:15 WET (UTC)	Árnason 11'; Sigurðsson 19' (yellow card) 90'; K.Konráðsson 77'; H.Á.Halldórsson (yellow card) 90+1'	Report	H.Hauksson (yellow card) 72'; D.Laxdal 82' (o.g.)	Stadium: Kórinn; Referee: Gudmundur Gudmundsson Ársæll

11 March 2017 3	Stjarnan	1 – 0	Leiknir F.	Garðabær
13:30 WET (UTC)	Sigurðsson 16'; A.Þ.Hauksson (yellow card) 83'; Héðinsson (yellow card) 86' (yellow-red card) 90'	Report	J.G.Suarez (yellow card) 44'; E.I.Hafsteinsson (yellow card) 54'	Stadium: Samsung völlurinn Referee: Arnar Thor Stefansson

16 March 2017 4	Fram Reykjavík	1 – 2	Stjarnan	Reykjavík
18:00 WET (UTC)	I.R.Antonsson (yellow card) 38'; I.Bubalo 72' (pen.); H.Madsen (yellow card) 86'; G.Magnusson (yellow card) 90+5'	Report	Árnason (yellow card) 32' (goal) 83'; Baldvinsson (yellow card) 38'; K.Konráðsson 62'; D.Laxdal (yellow card) 72'; H.Ægisson (yellow card) 90+5'	Stadium: Egilshöll; Referee: Halldor Johannsson Breiðfjörð

30 March 2017 5	Stjarnan	2 – 2	Grindavík	Garðabær
20:00 WET (UTC)	Sigurðsson (yellow card) 46'; Ó.B.Guðmundsson (yellow card) 48' (goal) 65'; Friðjónsson 83' (pen.) (yellow card) 90+3'; D.A.Hilmarsson (yellow card) 90'	Report	G.Þorsteinsson (yellow card) 27'; M.Björgvinsson 29', 30'; A.V.Þórarinsson (yellow card) 46'; B.A.Gudmundsson (yellow card) 88'; Žeravica (yellow card) 90+4'	Stadium: Samsung völlurinn Referee: Thomas Orri Hreinsson

=== Icelandic Cup ===
17 May 2017 Last 32	Thróttur Vogar	0 – 1	Stjarnan	Vogar
21:15 WET (UTC)		Report	M.A.Hilmarsson 10'; Sigurðsson (yellow card) 90'	Stadium: Vogabæjarvöllur; Referee: Helgi Mikael Jónasson

31 May 2017 Last 16	Valur	1 – 2	Stjarnan	Reykjavík
21:00 WET (UTC)	Lárusson 45+4' (pen.)	Report	Sigurðsson 34'; J.Laxdal 69'; A.Þ.Hauksson (yellow card) 90'	Stadium: Hlíðarendi; Referee: Gunnar Jarl Jónsson

2 July 2017 Quarter-final	Stjarnan	3 – 2	KR	Garðabær
19:15 WET (UTC)	H.Á.Halldórsson 1', 39'; A.Þ.Hauksson (yellow card) 42'; Sigurðsson (yellow card) 56'; Baldvinsson 90+4'	Report	Hauksson 20'; Chopart (yellow card) 45'; Sandnes (yellow card) 61'; T.Thomsen (yellow card) 66' (goal) 74'	Stadium: Samsungvöllur; Referee: Thorvaldur Arnason

27 July 2017 Semi-final	Stjarnan	1 – 2	IBV	Garðabær
17:30 WET (UTC)	Ó.B.Guðmundsson (yellow card) 42'; H.Á.Halldórsson 60'; D.Laxdal (yellow card) 90+1'	Report	H.Briem 66'; Bartalsstovu 73'; A.Arnarson (yellow card) 83'	Stadium: Samsungvöllur; Referee: Petur Gudmundsson

=== UEFA Europa League ===
==== Qualifying rounds ====
29 June 2017 First qualifying round 1st leg	Stjarnan (Iceland)	0 – 1	(Republic of Ireland) Shamrock Rovers	Garðabær, Iceland
19:15 WET (UTC)	J.K.Jósefsson (yellow card) 55'	Report	Shaw 38'	Stadium: Stjörnuvöllur; Attendance: 1,020; Referee: Tomasz Musiał (Poland)

6 July 2017 First qualifying round 2nd leg	Shamrock Rovers (Republic of Ireland)	1 – 0 (2 – 0 agg.)	(Iceland) Stjarnan	Dublin, Republic of Ireland
19:00 WET (UTC)	Burke 20'	Report	Sigurðsson (yellow card) 70'; Baldvinsson (yellow card) 90+4'	Stadium: Tallaght Stadium; Referee: Glenn Nyberg (Sweden)

== Squad statistics ==
As of match played 30 September 2017

=== Appearances and goals ===
No.	Pos	Nat	Player	Total		Úrvalsdeild		Icelandic Cup		Deildabikar		Europa League	
No.	Pos	Nat	Player	Apps	Goals	Apps	Goals	Apps	Goals	Apps	Goals	Apps	Goals
1	GK	(Iceland) ISL	Haraldur Björnsson	27	0	18	0	3	0	4	0	2	0
2	DF	(Iceland) ISL	Brynjar Gauti Guðjónsson	29	2	20	2	3+1	0	3	0	2	0
3	DF	(Iceland) ISL	Jósef Kristinn Jósefsson	33	3	22	3	4	0	5	0	2	0
4	DF	(Iceland) ISL	Jóhann Laxdal	32	3	21	2	5	1	4	0	2	0
5	DF	(Iceland) ISL	Óttar Bjarni Guðmundsson	16	1	6+2	0	2+1	0	3+2	1	0	0
6	MF	(Iceland) ISL	Þorri Geir Rúnarsson	2	0	1+1	0	0	0	0	0	0	0
7	FW	(Iceland) ISL	Guðjón Baldvinsson	29	14	19	12	5	2	3	0	2	0
8	MF	(Iceland) ISL	Baldur Sigurðsson	32	5	22	2	3+1	1	4	2	2	0
9	DF	(Iceland) ISL	Daníel Laxdal	30	1	18	1	5	0	4+1	0	2	0
10	MF	(Iceland) ISL	Hilmar Árni Halldórsson	34	16	22	10	5	6	5	0	2	0
11	FW	(Iceland) ISL	Arnar Már Björgvinsson	4	0	0	0	0	0	2+2	0	0	0
12	DF	(Iceland) ISL	Heiðar Ægisson	19	0	5+7	0	2+1	0	2	0	0+2	0
14	DF	(Iceland) ISL	Hörður Árnason	19	2	10+3	0	1+1	0	4	2	0	0
16	FW	(Iceland) ISL	Ævar Ingi Jóhannesson	12	1	0+7	1	0+1	0	3+1	0	0	0
17	FW	(Iceland) ISL	Ólafur Karl Finsen	16	1	2+10	1	0+2	0	0	0	0+2	0
19	FW	(Iceland) ISL	Hólmbert Friðjónsson	30	12	19	11	4+1	0	4	1	2	0
20	MF	(Iceland) ISL	Eyjólfur Héðinsson	27	1	14+3	1	4+1	0	3	0	2	0
23	MF	(Iceland) ISL	Dagur Austmann Hilmarsson	3	0	0	0	0	0	0+3	0	0	0
25	GK	(Iceland) ISL	Sveinn Sigurður Jóhannesson	8	0	4	0	2	0	1+1	0	0	0
26	FW	(Iceland) ISL	Kristófer Konráðsson	15	2	0+9	0	1	0	1+4	2	0	0
27	MF	(Iceland) ISL	Máni Austmann Hilmarsson	14	1	1+6	0	2+1	1	0+3	0	0+1	0
29	DF	(Iceland) ISL	Alex Þór Hauksson	30	0	18+1	0	4	0	0+5	0	2	0
30	MF	(Iceland) ISL	Kári Pétursson	3	0	0	0	0	0	0+3	0	0	0
		(Iceland) ISL	Sölvi Snær Fodilsson	1	0	0	0	0	0	0+1	0	0	0
		(Iceland) ISL	Larus Björnsson	2	0	0	0	0	0	0+2	0	0	0
Players away from the club on loan:
Players who appeared for Stjarnan but left during the season:

=== Goal scorers ===
As of match played 30 September 2017

Place	Position	Nation	Number	Name	Úrvalsdeild	Icelandic Cup	Deildabikar	Europa League	Total
1	MF	(Iceland)	10	Hilmar Árni Halldórsson	10	6	0	0	16
2	FW	(Iceland)	7	Guðjón Baldvinsson	12	2	0	0	14
3	FW	(Iceland)	19	Hólmbert Friðjónsson	11	0	1	0	12
4	MF	(Iceland)	8	Baldur Sigurðsson	2	1	2	0	5
5	DF	(Iceland)	3	Jósef Kristinn Jósefsson	3	0	0	0	3
6	DF	(Iceland)	9	Daníel Laxdal	2	0	0	0	2
6	DF	(Iceland)	2	Brynjar Gauti Guðjónsson	2	0	0	0	2
6	DF	(Iceland)	4	Jóhann Laxdal	1	1	0	0	2
6	FW	(Iceland)	26	Kristófer Konráðsson	0	0	2	0	2
6	DF	(Iceland)	14	Hörður Árnason	0	0	2	0	2
11	MF	(Iceland)	20	Eyjólfur Héðinsson	1	0	0	0	1
11	FW	(Iceland)	17	Ólafur Karl Finsen	1	0	0	0	1
11	FW	(Iceland)	16	Ævar Ingi Jóhannesson	1	0	0	0	1
11	DF	(Iceland)	5	Óttar Bjarni Guðmundsson	0	0	1	0	1
Total					46	10	8	0	64

=== Disciplinary record ===
As of match played 30 September 2017

Number	Nation	Position	Name	Úrvalsdeild		Icelandic Cup		Deildabikar		Europa League		Total	
Number	Nation	Position	Name	Yellow card	Red card	Yellow card	Red card	Yellow card	Red card	Yellow card	Red card	Yellow card	Red card
2	(Iceland)	DF	Brynjar Gauti Guðjónsson	2	0	0	0	0	0	0	0	2	0
3	(Iceland)	DF	Jósef Kristinn Jósefsson	1	0	0	0	0	0	1	0	2	0
4	(Iceland)	DF	Jóhann Laxdal	4	0	0	0	1	0	0	0	5	0
5	(Iceland)	DF	Óttar Bjarni Guðmundsson	1	0	1	0	1	0	0	0	3	0
7	(Iceland)	FW	Guðjón Baldvinsson	2	0	0	0	1	0	1	0	4	0
8	(Iceland)	MF	Baldur Sigurðsson	2	0	3	0	2	0	1	0	8	0
9	(Iceland)	DF	Daníel Laxdal	1	0	1	0	1	0	0	0	3	0
10	(Iceland)	MF	Hilmar Árni Halldórsson	0	0	0	0	1	0	0	0	1	0
12	(Iceland)	DF	Heiðar Ægisson	0	0	0	0	1	0	0	0	1	0
14	(Iceland)	DF	Hörður Árnason	0	0	0	0	1	0	0	0	1	0
19	(Iceland)	FW	Hólmbert Friðjónsson	2	1	0	0	1	0	0	0	3	1
20	(Iceland)	MF	Eyjólfur Héðinsson	3	1	0	0	2	1	0	0	5	2
27	(Iceland)	MF	Máni Austmann Hilmarsson	1	0	0	0	1	0	0	0	2	0
29	(Iceland)	DF	Alex Þór Hauksson	4	0	3	0	2	0	0	0	9	0
Total				23	2	8	0	15	1	3	0	49	3
