= 2017 Icelandic Men's Football League Cup =

Deildarbikar karla

Tournament details
- Country: Iceland
- Dates: 17 February 2017 — 17 April 2017
- Teams: 24

Final positions
- Champions: KR
- Runners-up: Grindavík

Tournament statistics
- Matches played: 67
- Goals scored: 243 (3.63 per match)
- Top goal scorer(s): Óskar Örn Hauksson (KR) (8 goals)
- All statistics correct as of 17 April 2017.

The 2017 Icelandic Men's Football League Cup was the 22nd season of the Icelandic Men's League Cup, a pre-season professional football competition in Iceland. The tournament involves twenty-four clubs from the top two leagues in Iceland, Úrvalsdeild karla and 1. deild karla, and uses a combination of group and knockout rounds to determine which team is the winner of the tournament.

The tournament began on 17 February and concluded with the final on 17 April 2017. KR were champions of the tournament.

== Participating teams ==
=== Úrvalsdeild ===
- Breiðablik
- FH
- Fjölnir
- Grindavík
- ÍA
- ÍBV
- KA
- KR
- Stjarnan
- Valur
- Víkingur
- Víkingur Ólafsvík

=== 1. deild karla ===
- Fram
- Fylkir
- Grótta
- Haukar
- HK
- ÍR
- Keflavík
- Leiknir F.
- Leiknir R.
- Selfoss
- Þróttur R.
- Þór

== League tables ==
=== Group 1 ===
Pos	Team	Pld	W	D	L	GF	GA	GD	Pts	Qualification	KA	FH	KEF	VIK	HAU	GRÓ
1	KA	5	4	0	1	8	3	+5	12	Qualification for the Quarter finals	—	—	3–0	0–1	1–0	—
2	FH	5	4	0	1	10	6	+4	12	Qualification for the Quarter finals	1–2	—	—	—	1–0	—
3	Keflavík	5	2	1	2	10	7	+3	7		—	2–3	—	—	1–1	5–0
4	Vikingur	5	2	1	2	7	8	−1	7		—	1–2	0–2	—	—	5–0
5	Haukar	5	0	3	2	6	8	−2	3		—	—	—	2–2	—	3–3
6	Grótta	5	0	1	4	7	16	−9	1		1–2	1–3	—	—	—	—

Updated to match(es) played on 31 March 2017. Source: ksí.is

17 February 2017 Matchday 1	Keflavík	5 – 0	Grótta	Reykjanesbær
20:00	Hansen 31', 38', 56'; Hauksson 75'; Elvarsson 82'	fótbolti.net Report ksí.is Report		Stadium: Reykjaneshöllin; Attendance: 212; Referee: Hjalti Þór Halldórsson

18 February 2017 Matchday 1	FH	1 – 0	Haukar	Reykjanesbær
14:00	Finnbogason 33'	fótbolti.net Report ksí.is Report		Stadium: Reykjaneshöllin; Attendance: 88; Referee: Elías Ingi Árnason

18 February 2017 Matchday 1	KA	0 – 1	Vikingur	Akureyri
17:00	Steingrímsson (yellow card) 90+4' (yellow-red card)	fótbolti.net Report ksí.is Report	Andrason 10'	Stadium: Boginn; Referee: Vilhelm Adolfsson

24 February 2017 Matchday 2	Keflavík	1 – 1	Haukar	Reykjanesbær
20:00	Hansen 18'	fótbolti.net Report ksí.is Report	Guðmundsson 51'	Stadium: Reykjaneshöllin; Referee: Jóhann Ingi Jónsson

25 February 2017 Matchday 2	Vikingur	1 – 2	FH	Reykjavík
15:15	Kristinsson 61'	fótbolti.net Report ksí.is Report	Pálsson 21' (yellow card) 78' (yellow-red card); Finnbogason 37'	Stadium: Egilshöll; Attendance: 55; Referee: Helgi Mikael Jónasson

25 February 2017 Matchday 2	Grótta	1 – 2	KA	Akranes
16:00	Þorsteinsson 56'	fótbolti.net Report ksí.is Report	Sigurgeirsson 9', 47'; Trninić (yellow card) 86' (red card)	Stadium: Akraneshöllin; Attendance: 45; Referee: Egill Arnar Sigurþórsson

5 March 2017 Matchday 3	FH	1 – 2	KA	Akranes
15:00	Lennon 48'; Gunnarsson (yellow card) 90+1' (red card)	fótbolti.net Report ksí.is Report	Sigurgeirsson 16'; Pétursson 82'	Stadium: Akraneshöllin; Referee: Valgeir Valgeirsson

10 March 2017 Matchday 3	Vikingur	0 – 2	Keflavík	Reykjavík
19:00		fótbolti.net Report ksí.is Report	Hauksson 5'; Hansen 35'	Stadium: Egilshöll; Attendance: 50; Referee: Helgi Mikael Jónasson

11 March 2017 Matchday 3	Haukar	3 – 3	Grótta	Reykjanesbær
14:00	Sigurðsson 14'; Elton Barros 39'; Stefánsson 36'	fótbolti.net Report ksí.is Report	Árnason 22', 57'; Guðjónsson 26'	Stadium: Reykjaneshöllin; Referee: Bryngeir Valdimarsson

17 March 2017 Matchday 4	Vikingur	3 – 2	Grótta	Reykjavík
19:00	Sverrisson 6'; Castillion 60'; Tufegdzic 65'	fótbolti.net Report ksí.is Report	Þorsteinsson 70'; Kostic 90+2'	Stadium: Víkin; Referee: Gunnar Jarl Jónsson

18 March 2017 Matchday 4	Keflavík	2 – 3	FH	Reykjanesbær
12:00	Sigurðsson 55'; Róbertsson 90+4'	fótbolti.net Report ksí.is Report	A. Björnsson 49'; Lennon 58' (pen.); H. Björnsson 87'	Stadium: Reykjaneshöllin; Referee: Einar Ingi Jóhannsson

18 March 2017 Matchday 4	KA	1 – 0	Haukar	Akureyri
16:00	Ormarsson 58'	fótbolti.net Report ksí.is Report		Stadium: Boginn; Referee: Sigurður Hjörtur Þrastarson

25 March 2017 Matchday 5	KA	3 – 0	Keflavík	Akureyri
14:00	Þorsteinsson 2'; Þorsteinsson 14'; Williams 47'	fótbolti.net Report ksí.is Report		Stadium: KA-völlur; Referee: Þóroddur Hjaltalín

30 March 2017 Matchday 5	Haukar	2 – 2	Vikingur	Hafnarfjörður
19:00	Þorsteinsson 33'; Elton Barros 40'	fótbolti.net Report ksí.is Report	Hilmarsson 30'; Tufegdzic 77' (pen.)	Stadium: Ásvellir; Referee: Ívar Orri Kristjánsson

30 March 2017 Matchday 5	Grótta	1 – 3	FH	Seltjarnarnes
19:00	Guðjónsson 27'	fótbolti.net Report ksí.is Report	Guðnason 23'; Finnbogason 24'; Ólafsson 54'	Stadium: Vivaldivöllurinn; Referee: Jóhann Ingi Jónsson

=== Group 2 ===
Pos	Team	Pld	W	D	L	GF	GA	GD	Pts	Qualification	KR	SEL	FYL	ÍBV	LER	FJÓ
1	KR	5	3	1	1	15	5	+10	10	Qualification for the Quarter finals	—	2–2	—	4–0	6–1	3–1
2	Selfoss	5	3	1	1	9	6	+3	10	Qualification for the Quarter finals	—	—	—	1–0	—	—
3	Fylkir	5	2	1	2	6	5	+1	7		1–0	1–2	—	1–1	1–2	2–0
4	ÍBV	5	2	1	2	7	9	−2	7		—	—	—	—	—	—
5	Leiknir R.	5	2	0	3	7	15	−8	6		—	1–0	—	1–3	—	2–5
6	Fjölnir	5	1	0	4	10	14	−4	3		—	2–4	—	2–3	—	—

Updated to match(es) played on 5 April 2017. Source: ksí.is

18 February 2017 Matchday 1	Fjölnir	2 – 3	ÍBV	Reykjavík
15:15	Ingason 6'; Ljubicic 15'	fótbolti.net Report ksí.is Report	Ragnarsson 27'; Briem 55'; Ómarsson 73'	Stadium: Egilshöll; Referee: Jóhann Ingi Jónsson

19 February 2017 Matchday 1	KR	2 – 2	Selfoss	Reykjavík
16:15	Pálmason 29'; Hauksson 42'	fótbolti.net Report ksí.is Report	Pachu 11'; Mack 44'	Stadium: Egilshöll; Referee: Guðmundur Ársæll Guðmundsson

19 February 2017 Matchday 1	Fylkir	1 – 2	Leiknir R.	Reykjavík
18:15	Guðmundsson 40'	fótbolti.net Report ksí.is Report	Árnason 22'; Magnússon 56'	Stadium: Egilshöll; Referee: Sigurður Óli Þórleifsson

24 February 2017 Matchday 2	KR	3 – 1	Fjölnir	Reykjavík
19:00	Chophart 8'; Friðgeirsson 32'; Beck 45'	fótbolti.net Report	Guðmundsson 57'	Stadium: Egilshöll; Referee: Sigurður Óli Þórleifsson

26 February 2017 Matchday 2	Leiknir R.	1 – 0	Selfoss	Reykjavík
18:15	Aðalsteinsson 60'	fótbolti.net Report ksí.is Report		Stadium: Egilshöll; Referee: Elías Ingi Árnason

5 March 2017 Matchday 2	Fylkir	1 – 1	ÍBV	Reykjavík
14:00	Ólafsson 7' (pen.)	fótbolti.net Report ksí.is Report	Punyed (yellow card) 65' (yellow-red card); Ingason 52'	Stadium: Fylkisvöllur; Attendance: 68; Referee: Helgi Mikael Jónasson

11 March 2017 Matchday 3	Leiknir R.	1 – 3	ÍBV	Reykjavík
15:15	Kárason 18'	fótbolti.net Report ksí.is Report	Ragnarsson 38', 55'; Pepa (red card) 66'; Bartalsstovu 78'	Stadium: Egilshöll; Referee: Ívar Orri Kristjánsson

11 March 2017 Matchday 3	Fjölnir	2 – 4	Selfoss	Reykjavík
17:15	Þorsteinsson 29' (o.g.); Guðjónsson 56' (pen.)	fótbolti.net Report ksí.is Report	Sigurgeirsson 1'; Ingibergsson 37', 51'; Þorsteinsson 89'	Stadium: Egilshöll; Attendance: 50; Referee: Vilhjálmur Alvar Þórarinsson

12 March 2017 Matchday 3	Fylkir	1 – 0	KR	Reykjavík
13:00	Arnþórsson 88'	fótbolti.net Report ksí.is Report		Stadium: Fylkisvöllur; Referee: Valgeir Valgeirsson

16 March 2017 Matchday 5	Leiknir R.	2 – 5	Fjölnir	Reykjavík
20:00	Hlöðversson 5'; Sigurðsson 71'	fótbolti.net Report ksí.is Report	Mathiasen 10', 35'; Þ. Guðjónsson 55', 68', 85'; T. Guðjónsson (yellow card) 86' (red card)	Stadium: Egilshöll; Referee: Elías Ingi Árnason

18 March 2017 Matchday 4	KR	4 – 0	ÍBV	Reykjavík
15:15	Pálmason 63'; Margeirsson 66'; Hauksson 82' (pen.), 84'	fótbolti.net Report ksí.is Report	Óskarsson (red card) 83'	Stadium: Egilshöll; Attendance: 114; Referee: Pétur Guðmundsson

18 March 2017 Matchday 4	Fylkir	1 – 2	Selfoss	Reykjavík
17:15	Jónsson 13'	fótbolti.net Report ksí.is Report	Mack 59'; Gíslason 90+3'	Stadium: Egilshöll; Referee: Sigurður Óli Þórleifsson

22 March 2017 Matchday 5	Selfoss	1 – 0	ÍBV	Selfoss
16:15	Lacalle 54'	fótbolti.net Report ksí.is Report	Þórðarson (yellow card) 76' (red card)	Stadium: JÁVERK-völlurinn; Referee: Jóhann Ingi Jónsson

1 April 2017 Matchday 5	KR	6 – 1	Leiknir R.	Reykjavík
13:00	Hauksson 23', 72'; Jóhannsson 33'; Chopart 44', 68'; Sigurðsson 90+1'	fótbolti.net Report ksí.is Report	Kárason 53'	Stadium: KR-völlur; Referee: Guðmundur Ársæll Guðmundsson

5 April 2017 Matchday 5	Fylkir	2 – 0	Fjölnir	Reykjavík
18:30	Ingason 89'; Guðmundsson 90+3'	fótbolti.net Report ksí.is Report		Stadium: Egilshöll; Referee: Erlendur Eiríksson

=== Group 3 ===
Pos	Team	Pld	W	D	L	GF	GA	GD	Pts	Qualification	VAL	ÍA	ÞÓR	HK	VIÓ	ÍR
1	Valur	5	5	0	0	17	7	+10	15	Withdrew After The Group Stage	—	3–1	—	—	2–1	5–2
2	ÍA	5	4	0	1	12	8	+4	12	Qualification for the Quarter finals	—	—	—	—	3–2	2–1
3	Þór	5	2	1	2	9	9	0	7	Qualification for the Quarter finals	2–4	2–3	—	2–1	—	—
4	HK	5	2	0	3	6	10	−4	6		1–3	0–2	—	—	2–1	—
5	Víkingur Ólafsvík	5	1	0	4	8	10	−2	3		—	—	0–2	—	—	—
6	ÍR	5	0	1	4	6	14	−8	1		—	—	1–1	1–2	1–4	—

Updated to match(es) played on 3 April 2017. Source: ksí.is

Valur decided not to participate in the knockout stages

17 February 2017 Matchday 1	Valur	5 – 2	ÍR	Reykjavík
19:00	Lárusson 8', 71'; Lýðsson 74'; Halldórsson 80'; H. Sigurðsson 83'	fótbolti.net Report ksí.is Report	Kárason 59'; Ómarsson 65'	Stadium: Egilshöll; Referee: Gunnar Jarl Jónsson

18 February 2017 Matchday 1	ÍA	3 – 2	Víkingur Ólafsvík	Akranes
11:00	Flosason 3'; Pétursson 80'; Lárusson 84'	fótbolti.net Report ksí.is Report	Hafsteinsson 50', 60'	Stadium: Akraneshöllin; Referee: Egill Arnar Sigurþórsson

18 February 2017 Matchday 1	Þór	2 – 1	HK	Akureyri
21:00	Hannesson 13'; Ævarsson 86' (pen.)	fótbolti.net Report ksí.is Report	Hallsson 47'	Stadium: Boginn; Attendance: Sigurður Hjörtur Þrastarson

24 February 2017 Matchday 2	HK	0 – 2	ÍA	Kópavogur
18:00		fótbolti.net Report ksí.is Report	Haraldsson 33'; Thorsteinsson 85'	Stadium: Kórinn; Attendance: 40; Referee: Helgi Mikael Jónasson

26 February 2017 Matchday 2	ÍR	1 – 4	Víkingur Ólafsvík	Reykjavík
16:15	Kárason 13'	fótbolti.net Report ksí.is Report	Faye 8', 62'; Hafsteinsson 38'; Jónsson 55'	Stadium: Egilshöll; Referee: Aðalbjörn Heiðar Þorsteinsson

9 March 2017 Matchday 2	HK	1 – 3	Valur	Kópavogur
18:00	Marteinsson 25' (pen.); Hlynsson (yellow card) 87' (red card)	fótbolti.net Report ksí.is Report	Halldórsson 57'; Ómarsson 60'; Ingvarsson 77'	Stadium: Kórinn; Referee: Egill Arnar Sigurþórsson

11 March 2017 Matchday 3	ÍA	2 – 1	ÍR	Akranes
11:00	Gunnlaugsson 61' (pen.); Haraldsson 69'	fótbolti.net Report ksí.is Report	Ström 15' (pen.)	Stadium: Akraneshöllin; Referee: Einar Ingi Jóhannsson

11 March 2017 Matchday 3	Víkingur Ólafsvík	0 – 2	Þór	Akranes
15:00	Birgisson (red card) 26'	fótbolti.net Report ksí.is Report	Stefánsson 67', 81'	Stadium: Akraneshöllin; Attendance: 46; Referee: Guðmundur Ársæll Guðmundsson

18 March 2017 Matchday 3	Þór	2 – 3	ÍA	Akureyri
19:00	Stefánsson 48'; Kristjánsson 90+2'	fótbolti.net Report ksí.is Report	Þórðarson 29'; Hafsteinsson 49'; Þorsteinsson 67'; Menzel (yellow card) 75' (red card); Lárusson (red card) 86'	Stadium: Boginn; Referee: Bjarni Hrannar Héðinsson

19 March 2017 Matchday 4	Valur	2 – 1	Víkingur Ólafsvík	Reykjavík
18:15	Bøgild 24'; Hansen 84'	fótbolti.net Report ksí.is Report	Ásbjörnsson 90+1'	Stadium: Valsvöllur; Referee: Þorvaldur Árnason

25 March 2017 Matchday 4	ÍR	1 – 2	HK	Reykjavík
17:15	Jóhannsson 13'	fótbolti.net Report ksí.is Report	Hallsson (yellow card) 37' (red card); Marteinsson 74'; Þórðarson 84'	Stadium: Egilshöll; Attendance: 75; Referee: Pétur Guðmundsson

25 March 2017 Matchday 4	Þór	2 – 4	Valur	Akureyri
19:00	Stefánsson 67'; Sigurðsson 69'; Gautason (red card) 82'; Hannesson (red card) 88'	fótbolti.net Report ksí.is Report	Lárusson 39', 71'; Guðjohnsen 51'; Björnsson 74'	Stadium: Boginn; Referee: Sigurður Hjörtur Þrastarson

30 March 2017 Matchday 5	HK	2 – 1	Víkingur Ólafsvík	Kópavogur
18:00	Marteinsson 1'; Morina 78'	fótbolti.net Report ksí.is Report	Birgisson 34'	Stadium: Kórinn; Referee: Elías Ingi Árnason

30 March 2017 Matchday 5	Valur	3 – 1	ÍA	Reykjavík
18:00	Lárusson 31', 73', 90'	fótbolti.net Report ksí.is Report	Þórðarson 83' (pen.)	Stadium: Valsvöllur; Attendance: 120; Referee: Vilhjálmur Alvar Þórarinsson

1 April 2017 Matchday 5	ÍR	1 – 1	Þór	Reykjavík
17:00	Þorvaldsson 90+4'	fótbolti.net Report ksí.is Report	Ævarsson 49'	Stadium: Hertz-völlurinn; Referee: Þorvaldur Árnason

=== Group 4 ===
Pos	Team	Pld	W	D	L	GF	GA	GD	Pts	Qualification	BRE	GRI	STJ	ÞRÓ	FRA	LEF
1	Breiðablik	5	3	2	0	12	1	+11	11	Qualification for the Quarter finals	—	1–1	0–0	—	—	6–0
2	Grindavík	5	3	2	0	14	6	+8	11	Qualification for the Quarter finals	—	—	—	—	3–1	—
3	Stjarnan	5	3	2	0	8	4	+4	11		—	2–2	—	3–1	—	1–0
4	Þróttur R.	5	2	0	3	12	12	0	6		0–4	2–3	—	—	—	6–0
5	Fram	5	0	1	4	8	13	−5	1		0–1	—	1–2	2–3	—	—
6	Leiknir F.	5	0	1	4	4	22	−18	1		—	0–5	—	—	4–4	—

Updated to match(es) played on 2 April 2017. Source: ksí.is

18 February 2017 Matchday 1	Breiðablik	0 – 0	Stjarnan	Kópavogur
12:00	Aðalsteinsson (red card) 11'	fótbolti.net Report ksí.is Report		Stadium: Fífan; Referee: Ívar Orri Kristjánsson

18 February 2017 Matchday 1	Leiknir F.	0 – 5	Grindavík	Reyðarfjörður
14:00		Report ksí.is Report	Þorsteinsson 2'; Daniels 75'; Ortiz 80', 84'; Guðmundsson 90+1'	Stadium: Fjarðabyggðarhöllin; Referee: Einar Ingi Jóhannsson

18 February 2017 Matchday 1	Fram	2 – 3	Þróttur R.	Reykjavík
17:15	Elísson 45+2' (pen.); Smidt 62'	fótbolti.net Report ksí.is Report	B. Jónasson 5'; Pálmason 43'; S. Jónasson 75'; Ólafsson (red card) 34'	Stadium: Egilshöll; Referee: Helgi Mikael Jónasson

25 February 2017 Matchday 2	Breiðablik	1 – 1	Grindavík	Kópavogur
12:00	Ólafsson 57'	fótbolti.net Report ksí.is Report	Daniels 15'	Stadium: Fifan; Referee: Gunnar Jarl Jónsson

28 February 2017 Matchday 2	Stjarnan	3 – 1	Þróttur R.	Kópavogur
20:10	Árnason 11'; Sigurðsson 19'; Konráðsson 77'	fótbolti.net Report ksí.is Report	D. Laxdal 82' (o.g.)	Stadium: Kórinn; Referee: Guðmundur Ársæll Guðmundsson

10 March 2017 Matchday 3	Þróttur R.	0 – 4	Breiðablik	Reykjavík
21:00		fótbolti.net Report ksí.is Report	Willumsson 16'; Gunnlaugsson 26'; Pedersen 67', 82'	Stadium: Egilshöll; Referee: Þorvaldur Árnason

11 March 2017 Matchday 3	Stjarnan	1 – 0	Leiknir F.	Garðabær
13:30	Sigurðsson 16'; Héðinsson (yellow card) 90' (red card)	fótbolti.net Report ksí.is Report		Stadium: Samsung völlurinn Attendance: 75; Referee: Arnar Þór Stefánsson

12 March 2017 Matchday 3	Grindavík	3 – 1	Fram	Reykjanesbær
14:00	Þórarinsson 7', 40'; Daniels 22'	fótbolti.net Report ksí.is Report	Magnússon 41'	Stadium: Reykjaneshöllin; Referee: Jóhann Ingi Jónsson

16 March 2017 Matchday 4	Fram	1 – 2	Stjarnan	Reykjavík
18:00	Bubalo 72' (pen.)	fótbolti.net Report ksí.is Report	Konráðsson 62'; Árnason 83'	Stadium: Egilshöll; Referee: Halldór Breiðfjörð Jóhannsson

17 March 2017 Matchday 4	Þróttur R.	2 – 3	Grindavík	Reykjavík
17:30	Bergsson 11'; Heiðarsson 67'	fótbolti.net Report ksí.is Report	Bjarnason 5' (pen.); Þórarinsson 77'; Daniels 90+1'	Stadium: Eimskipsvöllurinn; Attendance: 38; Referee: Helgi Mikael Jónasson

19 March 2017 Matchday 2	Leiknir F.	4 – 4	Fram	Reyðarfjörður
12:30	Jónsson 7', 45', 66'; Bjartþórsson 19'	fótbolti.net Report ksí.is Report	Bubalo 56' (pen.), 78'; Guðjónsson 60'; Aðalsteinsson 90'	Stadium: Fjarðabyggðarhöllin; Referee: Tómas Orri Hreinsson

23 March 2017 Matchday 4	Fram	0 – 1	Breiðablik	Reykjavík
19:15		fótbolti.net Report ksí.is Report	Gunnlaugsson 53'	Stadium: Framvöllur; Attendance: 42; Referee: Gunnar Jarl Jónsson

30 March 2017 Matchday 5	Stjarnan	2 – 2	Grindavík	Garðabær
19:00	Guðmundsson 65'; Friðjónsson 83' (pen.)	fótbolti.net Report ksí.is Report	Björgvinsson 29', 30'	Stadium: Samsung völlurinn Referee: Tómas Orri Hreinsson

31 March 2017 Matchday 5	Breiðablik	6 – 0	Leiknir F.	Kópavogur
19:15	Tokic 29', 54'; Pedersen 35'; Bjarnason 65'; Leifsson 71'; Ólafsson 82'	fótbolti.net Report ksí.is Report		Stadium: Fifan; Attendance: 75; Referee: Sigurður Óli Þórleifsson

2 April 2017 Matchday 5	Þróttur R.	6 – 0	Leiknir F.	Reykjavík
14:00	Atlason 3', 47'; Jónasson 7', 52'; Pálmason 24'; Þorvarðarson 53'; Örnólfsson (red card) 86'	fótbolti.net Report ksí.is Report		Stadium: Eimskipsvöllurinn; Referee: Aðalbjörn Heiðar Þorsteinsson

== Knockout stage ==
=== Quarter-finals ===
The top two teams of each group entered the quarter-finals stage. Valur, who finished 1st in Group 2, withdrew from the tournament after the group stages. Þór, who finished 3rd in Group 2, replaced Valur in the knockout stages.

9 April 2017	KR	4 – 1	Þór	Reykjavík
16:00	Chopart 19'; Thomsen 38'; Aðalsteinsson 43'; Hauksson 19' (pen.)	fótbolti.net Report ksí.is Report	Ævarsson 83'	Stadium: KR-völlur; Attendance: 88; Referee: Gunnar Jarl Jónsson

10 April 2017	KA	4 – 1	Selfoss	Akureyri
17:15	Ormarsson 47'; Aðalsteinsson 53'; Steingrímsson 59'; Hafsteinsson 89'	fótbolti.net Report ksí.is Report	Lacalle 41' (pen.)	Stadium: Boginn; Referee: Helgi Mikael Jónasson

10 April 2017	ÍA	1 – 4	Grindavík	Akranes
19:15	Pétursson 15'	fótbolti.net Report ksí.is Report	Daniels 1', 53'; Bjarnason 12', 29'; Hewson (yellow card) 77' (red card)	Stadium: Akraneshöllin; Attendance: 75; Referee: Guðmundur Ársæll Guðmundsson

10 April 2017	Breiðablik	0 – 3	FH	Kópavogur
19:15		fótbolti.net Report ksí.is Report	Crawford 19'; Finnbogason 71', 73'	Stadium: Fífan; Referee: Vilhjálmur Alvar Þórarinsson

=== Semi-finals ===
The semi-final matches were played on 13 April 2017.

13 April 2017	KR	2 – 1	FH	Reykjavík
14:00	Hauksson 31'; Thomsen 51'	fótbolti.net Report ksí.is Report	Finnbogason 39'	Stadium: KR-völlur; Referee: Þorvaldur Árnason

13 April 2017	KA	0 – 0 (2 – 4 p)	Grindavík	Akureyri
17:15		fótbolti.net Report ksí.is Report		Stadium: Boginn; Attendance: 263; Referee: Egill Arnar Sigurþórsson
	Penalties
	Steingrímsson (penalty missed); Lyng (penalty missed); Ormarsson (penalty scored); D. Bjarnason (penalty scored)		Guðmundsson (penalty missed); A. Bjarnason (penalty scored); Bryde (penalty scored); Þorsteinsson (penalty scored); Ólafsson (penalty scored)

=== Final ===
The final was played on 17 April 2017.

17 April 2017
14:00

Grindavík	0 – 4	KR
	fótbolti.net Report ksí.is Report	Hauksson 30'; Thomsen 62', 81'; Þórðarson 90+3'

Egilshöll, Reykjavík
Referee: Þóroddur Hjaltalín

== Top goalscorers ==
As of matches played on 17 April 2017

Rank	Player	Club	Goals
1	(Iceland) Óskar Örn Hauksson	KR	8
2	(Iceland) Sigurður Egill Lárusson	Valur	7
3	(United States) William Daniels	Grindavík	6
3	(Iceland) Kristján Flóki Finnbogason	FH	6
4	(Denmark) Jeppe Hansen	Keflavík	5
5	(Denmark) Kennie Chopart	KR	4
5	(Iceland) Þórir Guðjónsson	Fjölnir	4
5	(Iceland) Gunnar Örvar Stefánsson	Þór	4
