= 2017 Reykjavik Tournament =

2017 Reykjavik Tournament (Reykjavíkurmót)
Tournament details
- Country: Iceland
- Dates: 8 January 2017 – 13 February 2017
- Teams: 9

Final positions
- Champions: Valur
- Runner-up: Fjölnir

Tournament statistics
- Matches played: 19
- Goals scored: 52 (2.74 per match)
- Top goal scorer(s): Þórir Guðjónsson; Marcus Solberg (3 goals)
- All statistics correct as of 13 February 2017.

The 2017 Reykjavik Tournament was the 17th season of Iceland's annual pre-season tournament. The tournament involved nine of Reykjavík's top football sides from the top two leagues in Iceland, Úrvalsdeild karla and 1. deild, and used a combination of group and knockout rounds to determine which team was the winner of the tournament. The competition began on 8 January 2017 and concluded on 13 February 2017.

== Groups ==
=== Group A ===
| Pos | Team | Pld | W | D | L | GF | GA | GD | Pts | Qualification |
|---|---|---|---|---|---|---|---|---|---|---|
| 1 | Víkingur | 4 | 3 | 1 | 0 | 6 | 2 | +4 | 10 | Qualification to Semifinals |
| 2 | KR | 4 | 2 | 1 | 1 | 8 | 4 | +4 | 7 | Qualification to Semifinals |
| 3 | Fram | 4 | 2 | 0 | 2 | 6 | 8 | −2 | 6 | |
| 4 | Fylkir | 4 | 1 | 1 | 2 | 5 | 6 | −1 | 4 | |
| 5 | ÍR | 4 | 0 | 1 | 3 | 3 | 8 | −5 | 1 | |

Updated to match(es) played on 3 February 2017. Source: KSI

==== Matches ====
| 8 January 2017 | Víkingur | 1–0 | ÍR | Reykjavík |
| 20:10 | Jónsson 16' | KSI Report | | Stadium: Egilshöll; Referee: Ívar Orri Kristjánsson |

| 8 January 2017 | Fylkir | 1–2 | Fram | Reykjavík |
| 22:15 | Guðjónsson 74' (o.g.) | KSI Report | Reyes 14'; Guðjónsson 63' | Stadium: Egilshöll; Referee: Vilhjálmur Alvar Þórarinsson |

| 14 January 2017 | ÍR | 2–2 | Fylkir | Reykjavík |
| 16:15 | Pálsson 32', 44' | KSI Report | Eyþórsson 12'; Leifsson 19' | Stadium: Egilshöll; Referee: Aðalbjörn Heiðar Þorsteinsson |

| 14 January 2017 | KR | 1–1 | Víkingur | Reykjavík |
| 19:15 | Jósepsson 14' | KSI Report | Jónsson 90+3' | Stadium: Egilshöll; Attendance: 91; Referee: Jóhann Ingi Jónsson |

| 22 January 2017 | Fylkir | 2–1 | KR | Reykjavík |
| 18:15 | Jónsson 20', 23' | KSI Report | Tryggvason 45' | Stadium: Egilshöll; Referee: Tómas Orri Hreinsson |

| 22 January 2017 | Fram | 2–1 | ÍR | Reykjavík |
| 20:15 | Reyes 59'; Elísson 71' | KSI Report | Þorvaldsson 90+1' | Stadium: Egilshöll; Attendance: 53; Referee: Halldór Breiðfjörð Jóhannsson |

| 27 January 2017 | KR | 3–1 | Fram | Reykjavík |
| 21:00 | Pálmason 52'; Chopart 65'; Sigurðarson 73' | KSI Report | Þorláksson 35' | Stadium: Egilshöll; Attendance: 67; Referee: Helgi Mikael Jónasson |

| 27 January 2017 | Víkingur | 1–0 | Fylkir | Reykjavík |
| 23:00 | Jónsson 66' | KSI Report | | Stadium: Egilshöll; Attendance: 67; Referee: Jóhann Ingi Jónsson |

| 3 February 2017 | Fram | 1–3 | Víkingur | Reykjavík |
| 19:00 | Elísson 43' (pen.) | KSI Report | Eggertsson 10'; Tufegdžić 46'; Andrason 62' | Stadium: Egilshöll; Referee: Einar Ingi Jóhannsson |

| 3 February 2017 | ÍR | 0–3 | KR | Reykjavík |
| 21:00 | Jónasson (red card) 67' | KSI Report | Friðgeirsson 64'; Hauksson 68' (pen.); Chopart 77' | Stadium: Egilshöll; Referee: Ívar Orri Kristjánsson |

=== Group B ===
| Pos | Team | Pld | W | D | L | GF | GA | GD | Pts | Qualification |
|---|---|---|---|---|---|---|---|---|---|---|
| 1 | Fjölnir | 3 | 3 | 0 | 0 | 8 | 0 | +8 | 9 | Qualification to Semifinals |
| 2 | Valur | 3 | 2 | 0 | 1 | 7 | 5 | +2 | 6 | Qualification to Semifinals |
| 3 | Leiknir R. | 3 | 1 | 0 | 2 | 2 | 6 | −4 | 3 | |
| 4 | Þróttur Reykjavík | 3 | 0 | 0 | 3 | 3 | 9 | −6 | 0 | |

Updated to match(es) played on 28 January 2017. Source: KSI

==== Matches ====
| 15 January 2017 | Fjölnir | 1–0 | Leiknir R. | Reykjavík |
| 19:15 | Guðjónsson 13' | KSI Report | | Stadium: Egilshöll; Referee: Einar Ingi Jóhannsson |

| 15 January 2017 | Valur | 3–2 | Þróttur Reykjavík | Reykjavík |
| 20:15 | Hansen 33', 44'; Ingvarsson 67' | KSI Report | Jónasson 4'; Sigurðsson 11' (o.g.) | Stadium: Egilshöll; Referee: Hjalti Þór Halldórsson |

| 21 January 2017 | Fjölnir | 3–0 | Valur | Reykjavík |
| 17:15 | Solberg 10'; Ljubicic 64'; Guðjónsson 85' (pen.) | KSI Report | | Stadium: Egilshöll; Referee: Hjalti Þór Halldórsson |

| 21 January 2017 | Leiknir R. | 2–1 | Þróttur Reykjavík | Reykjavík |
| 19:15 | Ingvarsson 15'; Jónsson 29' | KSI Report | Haraldsson 58' | Stadium: Egilshöll; Referee: Guðmundur Ársæll Guðmundsson |

| 28 January 2017 | Þróttur Reykjavík | 0–4 | Fjölnir | Reykjavík |
| 15:15 | | KSI Report | Jónasson 19', 86'; Guðjónsson 49' (pen.); Ingason 62' | Stadium: Egilshöll; Referee: Aðalbjörn Heiðar Þorsteinsson |

| 28 January 2017 | Valur | 4–0 | Leiknir R. | Reykjavík |
| 17:15 | Halldórsson 41', 86'; Magnússon 85'; Catano 87' | KSI Report | | Stadium: Egilshöll; Referee: Sigurður Óli Þórleifsson |

== Semifinals ==
The top two teams from each group entered the semifinals stage. The ties were played on 9 February 2017 at Egilshöll, Reykjavík, one after the other.

| 9 February 2017 | Víkingur | 0–0 (3–5 p) | Valur | Reykjavík |
| 19:00 | Sveinsson (yellow card) 54' (yellow-red card) | ksí.is fótbolti.net | | Stadium: Egilshöll; Attendance: 99; Referee: Vilhjálmur Alvar Þórarinsson |
| | Penalties |
| | Kristinsson (penalty scored); Í. Jónsson (penalty missed); Tufegdžić (penalty scored); Hilmarsson (penalty scored) | | Lýðsson (penalty scored); Björnsson (penalty scored); Ingvarsson (penalty scored); Guðjohnsen (penalty scored); Sigurðsson (penalty scored) |

| 9 February 2017 | Fjölnir | 3–0 | KR | Reykjavík |
| 21:00 | Óskarsson 40'; Solberg 56', 74' | ksí.is fótbolti.net | | Stadium: Egilshöll; Referee: Erlendur Eiríksson |

== Final ==
The 2017 Reykjavik Tournament final was contested between Valur and Fjölnir, the winners of the two semifinal matches. The final was played at Egilshöll, Reykjavík, on 13 February 2017.

13 February 2017
19:00

| Valur | 1 – 0 | Fjölnir |
|---|---|---|
| Torfi Tímoteus Gunnarsson 43' (o.g.) | ksí.is fótbolti.net | Þórir Guðjónsson (red card) 92' |

Egilshöll, Reykjavík
Referee: Ívar Orri Kristjánsson

== Top scorers ==
As of 13 February 2017

| Rank | Player | Club | Goals |
|---|---|---|---|
| 1 | (Iceland) Þórir Guðjónsson | Fjölnir | 3 |
| 1 | (Denmark) Marcus Solberg | Fjölnir | 3 |
| 2 | (Iceland) Ægir Jarl Jónasson | Fjölnir | 2 |
| 2 | (Iceland) Alex Freyr Elísson | Fram | 2 |
| 2 | (Iceland) Kristófer Jacobson Reyes | Fram | 2 |
| 2 | (Iceland) Hákon Ingi Jónsson | Fylkir | 2 |
| 2 | (Denmark) Kennie Chopart | KR | 2 |
| 2 | (Iceland) Kristinn Ingi Halldórsson | Valur | 2 |
| 2 | (Denmark) Nikolaj Andreas Hansen | Valur | 2 |
| 2 | (Iceland) Ívar Örn Jónsson | Víkingur | 2 |
| 2 | (Iceland) Stefán Þór Pálsson | Víkingur | 2 |
