= 2019 Icelandic Super Cup =

Meistarakeppni Karla 2019
Valur	Stjarnan
0	0
- After extra time Stjarnan won 6–5 on penalties
- Date: 18 April 2019
- Venue: Origo völlurinn, Reykjavík
- Referee: Vilhjálmur Þórarinsson
- Attendance: 0

The 2019 Icelandic Super Cup was the 48th final in the Icelandic Super Cup, an annual game between the 2018 Úrvalsdeild champions and the 2018 Icelandic Cup champions. The match was played at Origo völlurinn in Reykjavík on 18 April.

== Match ==
=== Details ===
18 April 2019
21:00 WET

Valur	0–0 (a.e.t.)	Stjarnan
	Report
Penalties
Bartalsstovu (penalty scored); Lyng (penalty scored); Petry (penalty scored); Ingvarsson (penalty scored); Martin (penalty scored); Ómarsson (penalty missed)	5–6	(penalty scored) Halldórsson; (penalty scored) Sigurðsson; (penalty scored) Gribenco; (penalty scored) Héðinsson; (penalty scored) Valdimarsson; (penalty scored) Laxdal

Origo völlurinn, Reykjavík
Attendance: 0
Referee: Vilhjálmur Þórarinsson

Valur	Stjarnan

GK	1	(Iceland) Hannes Halldórsson	(red card) 45'
RB	2	(Iceland) Birkir Sævarsson
CB	6	(Sweden) Sebastian Hedlund	(yellow card) 84'
CB	20	(Iceland) Orri Ómarsson
LB	21	(Iceland) Bjarni Eiríksson
CM	7	(Iceland) Haukur Sigurðsson	(yellow card) 23'	(substituted off) 59'
CM	19	(Denmark) Lasse Petry
CM	11	(Iceland) Sigurður Lárusson		(substituted off) 45'
RW	77	(Faroe Islands) Kaj Bartalsstovu
LW	28	(Denmark) Emil Lyng
CF	9	(England) Gary Martin
Substitutes:
GK	33	(Iceland) Anton Einarsson		(substituted in) 45'
DF	3	(Iceland) Ívar Jónsson
MF	4	(Iceland) Einar Ingvarsson		(substituted in) 59'
MF	8	(Iceland) Kristinn Halldórsson
FW	71	(Iceland) Ólafur Finsen
FW	12	(Iceland) Garðar Gunnlaugsson
FW	17	(Iceland) Andri Adolphsson
Manager:
(Iceland) Ólafur Jóhannesson

	width=25
GK	1	(Iceland) Haraldur Björnsson
CB	4	(Denmark) Jóhann Laxdal	(yellow card) 80'
CB	2	(Iceland) Brynjar Guðjónsson
CB	19	(Denmark) Martin Rauschenberg
DM	15	(Iceland) Thorarinn Valdimarsson
CM	20	(Iceland) Eyjólfur Héðinsson
CM	29	(Iceland) Alex Hauksson		(substituted off) 77'
AM	7	(Iceland) Guðjón Baldvinsson
RW	10	(Iceland) Hilmar Halldórsson
LW	11	(Iceland) Thorsteinn Ragnarsson	(yellow card) 56'	(substituted off) 62'
CF	22	(Iceland) Guðmundur Hafsteinsson		(substituted off) 62'
Substitutes:
GK	23	(Iceland) Guðjón Sigurjónsson
DF	8	(Iceland) Baldur Sigurðsson		(substituted in) 62'
DF	21	(Iceland) Elís Björnsson
MF	16	(Iceland) Ævar Jóhannesson		(substituted in) 62'
MF	6	(Iceland) Thorri Rúnarsson
MF	19	(Iceland) Sölvi Guðbjargarson
FW	14	(Denmark) Nimo Gribenco		(substituted in) 77'
Manager:
(Iceland) Rúnar Sigmundsson

Assistant referees:
Gylfi Sigurðsson
Jóhann Guðmundsson

Match rules

- 90 minutes.
- 30 minutes of extra time if necessary.
- Penalty shoot-out if scores still level.
- Seven named substitutes.
- Maximum of three substitutions.
