= 2018 Reykjavik Tournament =

2018 Reykjavik Tournament (Reykjavíkurmót)
Tournament details
- Country: Iceland
- Dates: 6 January 2017 – 5 February 2018
- Teams: 9

Final positions
- Champions: Fjölnir
- Runner-up: Fylkir

Tournament statistics
- Matches played: 19
- Goals scored: 66 (3.47 per match)
- Top goal scorer(s): Þórir Guðjónsson (6 goals)
- All statistics correct as of 5 February 2018.

The 2018 Reykjavik Tournament was the 18th season of Iceland's annual men's pre-season tournament. The tournament involved nine of Reykjavík's top football sides from the top two leagues in Iceland, Úrvalsdeild karla and 1. deild karla, and used a combination of group and knockout rounds to determine which team was the winner of the tournament. The competition began on 6 January 2018 and concluded on 5 February 2018.

== Groups ==
=== Group A ===
Pos	Team	Pld	W	D	L	GF	GA	GD	Pts	Qualification
1	Fjölnir	4	3	1	0	11	5	+6	10	Qualification to Semifinals
2	Fylkir	4	2	2	0	8	3	+5	8	Qualification to Semifinals
3	Valur	4	2	0	2	7	7	0	6	
4	Fram	4	0	2	2	3	6	−3	2	
5	ÍR	4	0	1	3	2	10	−8	1	

Updated to match(es) played on 27 January 2018. Source: ksi.is
- ÍR - Fjölnir results are changed to 0-3 due to ÍR's use of unregistered players

==== Matches ====
6 January 2018	Fjölnir	4 - 2	Valur	Reykjavík
15:15	Hans Viktor Guðmundsson 41'; Birnir Snær Ingason 44'; Þórir Guðjónsson 75'; Jóhann Árni Gunnarsson 82'	ksi.is	Arnar Sveinn Geirsson 25'; Guðjón Pétur Lýðsson 45+2' (pen.)	Stadium: Egilshöll; Referee: Helgi Mikael Jónasson

6 January 2018	Fylkir	0 - 0	Fram	Reykjavík
17:15		ksi.is		Stadium: Egilshöll; Referee: Egill Arnar Sigurþórsson

12 January 2018	Valur	1 - 3	Fylkir	Reykjavík
19:00	Einar Karl Ingvarsson 84'	ksi.is	Oddur Ingi Guðmundsson 16'; Hákon Ingi Jónsson 36'; Ragnar Bragi Sveinsson 90+4'	Stadium: Egilshöll; Referee: Vilhjálmur Alvar Þórarinsson

12 January 2018	ÍR	0 - 3*	Fjölnir	Reykjavík
21:00	Guðfinnur Þórir Ómarsson 68'	ksi.is	Ægir Jarl Jónasson 74'; Þórir Guðjónsson 74', 90+2' (pen.)	Stadium: Egilshöll; Referee: Gunnþór Steinar Jónsson ÍR used unregistered players. Results are therefore changed from 1-3 to 0-3

17 January 2018	Fylkir	3 - 0	ÍR	Reykjavík
19:00	Hákon Ingi Jónsson 24'; Emil Ásmundsson 83'; Albert Brynjar Ingason 90+3'	ksi.is		Stadium: Egilshöll; Referee: Jóhann Ingi Jónsson

17 January 2018	Fram	0 - 2	Valur	Reykjavík
21:00		ksi.is	Ólafur Karl Finsen 27'; Andri Adolphsson 64'	Stadium: Egilshöll; Referee: Ívar Orri Kristjánsson

21 January 2018	ÍR	2 - 2	Fram	Reykjavík
18:15	Jónatan Hróbjartsson 56'; Guðfinnur Þórir Ómarsson 77'	ksi.is	Guðmundur Magnússon 10' (pen.), 89'	Stadium: Egilshöll; Referee: Arnar Þór Stefánsson

21 January 2018	Fjölnir	2 - 2	Fylkir	Reykjavík
20:15	Birnir Snær Ingason 15'; Arnór Breki Ásþórsson 37'	ksi.is	Albert Brynjar Ingason 56'; Hákon Ingi Jónsson 73'	Stadium: Egilshöll; Attendance: 180; Referee: Pétur Guðmundsson

27 January 2018	Valur	2 - 0	ÍR	Reykjavík
15:15	Eiður Aron Sigurbjörnsson 44'; Dion Jeremy Acoff 68'	ksi.is		Stadium: Egilshöll; Referee: Sigurður Óli Þórleifsson

27 January 2018	Fram	1 - 2	Fjölnir	Reykjavík
17:15	Helgi Guðjónsson 83'	ksi.is	Ægir Jarl Jónasson 9'; Valgeir Lunddal Friðriksson 22'	Stadium: Egilshöll; Referee: Aðalbjörn Heiðar Þorsteinsson

=== Group B ===
Pos	Team	Pld	W	D	L	GF	GA	GD	Pts	Qualification
1	KR	3	2	1	0	12	4	+8	7	Qualification to Semifinals
2	Leiknir R.	3	2	0	1	6	4	+2	6	Qualification to Semifinals
3	Þróttur R.	3	1	0	2	3	11	−8	3	
4	Víkingur R.	3	0	1	2	3	5	−2	1	

Updated to match(es) played on 26 January 2018. Source: KSI

==== Matches ====
13 January 2018	KR	3 - 2	Leiknir R.	Reykjavík
15:15	Pálmi Rafn Pálmason 12'; Atli Sigurjónsson 15'; Björgvin Stefánsson 45'	ksi.is	Tómas Óli Garðarsson 63'; Sævar Atli Magnússon 90+1'	Stadium: Egilshöll; Referee: Erlendur Eiríksson

13 January 2018	Víkingur R.	1 - 2	Þróttur R.	Reykjavík
17:15	Halldór Smári Sigurðsson 72'	ksi.is	Daði Bergsson 29'; Víðir Þorvarðarson 75'	Stadium: Egilshöll; Referee: Elías Ingi Árnason

19 January 2018	KR	2 - 2	Víkingur R.	Reykjavík
19:00	Morten Beck 45'; Kennie Chopart 76'	ksi.is	Nikolaj Hansen 63'; Logi Tómasson 86'	Stadium: Egilshöll; Referee: Þorvaldur Árnason

19 January 2018	Leiknir R.	3 - 1	Þróttur R.	Reykjavík
21:00	Skúli E. Kristjánsson Sigurz 56'; Tómas Óli Garðarsson 69'; Sævar Atli Magnússon 86'	ksi.is	Víðir Þorvarðarson 22'	Stadium: Egilshöll; Referee: Einar Ingi Jóhannsson

26 January 2018	Þróttur R.	0 - 7	KR	Reykjavík
19:00		ksi.is	Atli Sigurjónsson 18', 21'; Björgvin Stefánson 52'; Pálmi Rafn Pálmason 55'; Óskar Örn Hauksson 65'; Kennie Chopart 81', 84'	Stadium: Egilshöll; Referee: Egill Arnar Sigurþórsson

26 January 2018	Víkingur R.	0 - 1	Leiknir R.	Reykjavík
21:00		ksi.is	Tómas Óli Garðarsson 84'	Stadium: Egilshöll; Attendance: 50; Referee: Vilhjálmur Alvar Þórarinsson

== Semifinals ==
The top two teams from each group entered the semifinals stage. The ties were played on 1 February 2018 at Egilshöll, Reykjavík, one after the other.

1 February 2018	Fjölnir	5 - 0	Leiknir R.	Reykjavík
19:00	Ísak Óli Helgason 11', 50'; Hilmar Þór Hilmarsson 16' (o.g.); Ægir Jarl Jónasson 47'; Hans Viktor Guðmundsson 65'	ksi.is	Kristján Páll Jónsson (red card) 67'	Stadium: Egilshöll; Attendance: 50; Referee: Guðmundur Ársæll Guðmundsson

1 February 2018	KR	0 - 1	Fylkir	Reykjavík
21:00	André Bjerregaard (red card) 23'	ksi.is	Orri Sveinn Stefánsson 77'	Stadium: Egilshöll; Referee: Helgi Mikael Jónasson

== Final ==
The 2018 Reykjavik Tournament final was contested between the winners of the two semifinal matches. The final was played at Egilshöll, Reykjavík, on 5 February 2018.

5 February 2018
20:00

Fjölnir	3 - 2	Fylkir
Guðjónsson 10', 68', 80'	ksi.is fotbolti.net	Ingason 40', 52'; Ásgeirsson (red card) 90+3'

Egilshöll, Reykjavík
Referee: Ívar Orri Kristjánsson

== Top scorers ==
As of 5 February 2018

Rank	Player	Club	Goals
1	(Iceland) Þórir Guðjónsson	Fjölnir	6
2	(Iceland) Albert Brynjar Ingason	Fylkir	4
3	(Iceland) Hákon Ingi Jónsson	Fylkir	3
3	(Iceland) Tómas Óli Garðarsson	Leiknir R.	3
3	(Iceland) Atli Sigurjónsson	KR	3
3	(Denmark) Kennie Chopart	KR	3
3	(Iceland) Ægir Jarl Jónasson	Fjölnir	3
4	(Iceland) Sævar Atli Magnússon	Leiknir R.	2
4	(Iceland) Víðir Þorvarðarson	Þróttur R.	2
4	(Iceland) Guðfinnur Þórir Ómarsson	ÍR	2
4	(Iceland) Guðmundur Magnússon	Fram	2
4	(Iceland) Birnir Snær Ingason	Fjölnir	2
4	(Iceland) Björgvin Stefánsson	KR	2
4	(Iceland) Pálmi Rafn Pálmason	KR	2
4	(Iceland) Ísak Óli Helgason	Fjölnir	2
4	(Iceland) Hans Viktor Guðmundsson	Fjölnir	2
5	(Iceland) Jóhann Árni Gunnarsson	Fjölnir	1
5	(Iceland) Helgi Guðjónsson	Fram	1
5	(Iceland) Arnar Sveinn Geirsson	Valur	1
5	(Iceland) Eiður Aron Sigurbjörnsson	Valur	1
5	(United States) Dion Jeremy Acoff	Valur	1
5	(Iceland) Guðjón Pétur Lýðsson	Valur	1
5	(Iceland) Oddur Ingi Guðmundsson	Fylkir	1
5	(Iceland) Valgeir Lunddal Friðriksson	Fjölnir	1
5	(Iceland) Arnór Breki Ásþórsson	Fjölnir	1
5	(Iceland) Einar Karl Ingvarsson	Valur	1
5	(Iceland) Ragnar Bragi Sveinsson	Fylkir	1
5	(Iceland) Óskar Örn Hauksson	KR	1
5	(Iceland) Daði Bergsson	Þróttur R.	1
5	(Iceland) Halldór Smári Sigurðsson	Víkingur R.	1
5	(Iceland) Ólafur Karl Finsen	Valur	1
5	(Iceland) Andri Adolphsson	Valur	1
5	(Iceland) Emil Ásmundsson	Fylkir	1
5	(Iceland) Orri Sveinn Stefánsson	Fylkir	1
5	(Iceland) Skúli E. Kristjánsson Sigurz	Leiknir R.	1
5	(Denmark) Nikolaj Hansen	Víkingur R.	1
5	(Iceland) Logi Tómasson	Víkingur R.	1
5	(Denmark) Morten Beck	KR	1
5	(Iceland) Jónatan Hróbjartsson	ÍR	1
