= 2016 Reykjavik Tournament =

2016 Reykjavik Tournament (Reykjavíkurmót)
Tournament details
- Country: Iceland
- Dates: 8 January – 8 February
- Teams: 9

Final positions
- Champions: Leiknir Reykjavík
- Runners-up: Valur

Tournament statistics
- Matches played: 18
- Goals scored: 73 (4.06 per match)
- Top goal scorer: Elvar Páll Sigurdsson (6)

This tournament is an annual pre-season football tournament for teams from the Icelandic men's premier division (Úrvalsdeild karla).

== Groups ==
=== Group A ===
Team	Pld	W	D	L	GF	GA	GD	Pts
Leiknir Reykjavík	4	2	1	1	12	7	+5	7
Víkingur	4	2	1	1	9	9	0	7
Fylkir	4	2	0	2	6	3	+3	6
KR	4	2	0	2	9	9	0	6
ÍR	4	0	2	2	7	15	−8	2

8 January 2016	Víkingur	3–3	ÍR	Víkin, Reykjavík
21:00	Pálsson 8', 32'; Jónsson 12' (pen.); Kristinsson (yellow card) 78' (yellow-red card)		Sigurþórsson 22'; Jónasson 50'; Sveinsson (yellow card) 52'; Björnsson 68'; Ómarsson (yellow card) 74'	Referee: Helgi Mikael Jónasson

14 January 2016	KR	2–3	Víkingur	Egilshöll, Reykjavík
21:00	Pálmason 9'; Tryggvason (yellow card) 48'; Gunnarsson (red card) 50'; Jósepsson 82'; Jensson (red card) 90+2'		Arnarsson (yellow card) 38'; Jónsson 41', 90+3' (pen.); Pálsson 55'; Hilmarsson (yellow card) 58'; Bjarnason (yellow card) 69'	Referee: Gunnar Jarl Jónsson

14 January 2016	ÍR	0–4	Fylkir	Egilshöll, Reykjavík
23:00	Jóhannsson (yellow card) 87'		Jóhannsson 30'; Þorvarðarson 32', 88' (pen.); Sveinsson 42'; Ólafsson (yellow card) 63'	Referee: Guðmundur Ársæll Guðmundsson

17 January 2016	Fylkir	0–2	Leiknir Reykjavík	Egilshöll, Reykjavík
20:15			Kristjánsson 39'; Sigurðsson 87'	Referee: Vilhjálmur Alvar Þórarinsson

20 January 2016	Leiknir Reykjavík	3–3	ÍR	Egilshöll, Reykjavík
21:00	Sigurðsson 12'; Magnússon (yellow card) 27'; Halldórsson 41'; Björnsson 56'; Kristjánsson (yellow card) 90+4'		Sigurþórsson (yellow card) 58' (goal) 69' (pen.); Runólfsson (yellow card) 61' (goal) 70'; Viðarsson 72'; Arnarsson (yellow card) 82'; Sveinsson (yellow card) 90+1'	Referee: Aðalbjörn Heiðar Þorsteinsson

20 January 2016	Fylkir	0–1	KR	Egilshöll, Reykjavík
23:00	Sveinsson (yellow card) 14'; Eyþórsson (yellow card) 80'; Ásgeirsson (yellow card) 87'		Friðjónsson 90+2'	Referee: Garðar Örn Hinriksson

24 January 2016	Víkingur	0–2	Fylkir	Egilshöll, Reykjavík
18:15	Kujundzic (yellow card) 16'; Williamson (red card) 38'; Jónsson (yellow card) 75'		Jóhannesson 26'; Ásgeirsson (red card) 38'; Erlendsson (yellow card) 41'; Vergara 50'; Eyþórsson (yellow card) 55'; Jónsson (yellow card) 76'; Sveinsson (yellow card) 83'	Referee: Aðalbjörn Heiðar Þorsteinsson

24 January 2016	KR	1–5	Leiknir Reykjavík	Egilshöll, Reykjavík
20:15	Sigurðarson 20'; Michaelsson (red card) 75'		Kárason 19', 27'; Arnarson 68', 72'; Sigurðsson 76'; Hlöðversson (yellow card) 80'	Referee: Leiknir Ágústsson

29 January 2016	ÍR	1–5	KR	Egilshöll, Reykjavík
21:00	Kárason 37'; Breiðdal (yellow card) 39'		Martin 8', 30'; Þórðarson 39'; Möller 54'; Friðgeirsson (yellow card) 60'; Pálmason 66'	Attendance: 77; Referee: Pétur Guðmundsson

29 January 2016	Leiknir Reykjavík	2–3	Víkingur	Egilshöll, Reykjavík
23:00	? 8' (o.g.); Björnsson 61'		Kristinsson 13' (yellow card) 68'; Jónsson 25', 65'; Baldvinsson (yellow card) 39'	Referee: Valgeir Valgeirsson

=== Group B ===
Team	Pld	W	D	L	GF	GA	GD	Pts
Valur	3	3	0	0	8	1	+7	9
Fjölnir	3	1	1	1	10	7	+3	4
Fram	3	1	1	1	5	4	+1	4
Þróttur Reykjavík	3	0	0	3	1	12	−11	0

15 January 2016	Valur	2–1	Fram	Egilshöll, Reykjavík
21:00	Stefánsson 15'; Sigurðsson 34'		Elísson 90+4'	Referee: Óli Njáll Ingólfsson

15 January 2016	Fjölnir	8–1	Þróttur Reykjavík	Egilshöll, Reykjavík
23:00	Guðjónsson 19', 34'; Ingason 21', 24', 90+2' (pen.); Sigurðarson 26'; Hróbjartsson 52'; Guðmundsson (yellow card) 61'; Rúnarsson 90+3'		Örnólfsson 22' (pen.); Ólafsson (yellow card) 26'; Ásbjörnsson (yellow card) 55'; Jónasson (yellow card) 67'; Heiðarsson (yellow card) 78' (yellow card) 87' (yellow-red card); Hallsson (yellow card) 87' (yellow card) 90+2' (yellow-red card)	Referee: Erlendur Eiríksson

22 January 2016	Valur	4–0	Fjölnir	Egilshöll, Reykjavík
21:00	Sigurðsson 29'; Lýðsson 36'; Gunnarsson (yellow card) 57'; Christiansen (yellow card) 61'; Bergsson 71'; Ingvarsson 79'		Guðjónsson (yellow card) 45'; Ársælsson (yellow card) 53'	Attendance: 60; Referee: Gunnar Helgason

22 January 2016	Fram	2–0	Þróttur Reykjavík	Egilshöll, Reykjavík
23:00	Hilmarsson (yellow card) 18'; Geirsson (yellow card) 34'; Gunnarsson 76'; Ómarsson 89'		Pétursson (yellow card) 53'; Ólafsson (yellow card) 90'	Referee: Sigurður Óli Þórleifsson

28 January 2016	Þróttur Reykjavík	0–2	Valur	Egilshöll, Reykjavík
21:00	Green (yellow card) 67'		Sigurðsson 18'; Stefánsson 42' (yellow card) 42'; Christiansen (yellow card) 85'	Referee: Örvar Sær Gíslason

28 January 2016	Fjölnir Reykjavík	2–2	Fram Reykjavík	Egilshöll, Reykjavík
23:00	Hróbjartsson (yellow card) 27'; Guðjónsson 59' (pen.); Guðjónsson 61' (yellow card) 86'		Elísson (red card) 18'; Þorláksson 36'; Björnsson (yellow card) 59'; Hilmarsson (yellow card) 73'; Jónsson 75'	Referee: Gunnar Sverrir Gunnarsson

== Semifinals ==
4 February 2016	Leiknir Reykjavík	3–3 (5–4 p)	Fjölnir Reykjavík	Egilshöll, Reykjavík
20:45	Kristjánsson (yellow card) 51' (goal) 54', 79'; Sigurðsson 61'; Arnarson (yellow card) 58'		Guðmundsson 7' (yellow card) 50'; Ingason 26'; Guðjónsson 80'	Referee: Þorvaldur Árnason
	Penalties
	Björnsson (penalty scored); Arnarson (penalty scored); Ingvarsson (penalty scored); Jónsson (penalty scored); Kristjánsson (penalty scored)		Sigurðarson (penalty scored); Guðjónsson (penalty scored); Guðmundsson (penalty scored); Guðmundsson (penalty scored); Ingason (penalty missed)

4 February 2016	Valur	1–0	Víkingur Reykjavík	Egilshöll, Reykjavík
22:45	Lýðsson 48'; Sigurðsson (yellow card) 31'; Christiansen (yellow card) 90+1'		Kristinsson (yellow card) 54'	Referee: Gunnar Jarl Jónsson

== Final ==
8 February 2016	Leiknir Reykjavík	4–1	Valur	Egilshöll, Reykjavík
21:00	Sigurðsson 23'; Ingvarsson 28', 51'; Björnsson 74' (pen.)		Sigurðsson 14' (pen.)	Attendance: 100; Referee: Vilhjálmur Alvar Þórarinsson
