= 2018 Icelandic Cup =

Association football tournament season

Borgunarbikar

Tournament details
- Country: Iceland
- Teams: 78

Final positions
- Champions: Stjarnan FC
- Runners-up: Breiðablik

The 2018 Icelandic Cup, also known as Borgunarbikar for sponsorship reasons, was the 59th edition of the Icelandic national football cup. The 2017 winners and current holders of the cup are ÍBV after beating FH 1–0 in the final. The 2018 Icelandic Cup final was played on 15 September 2018 at Laugardalsvöllur, and won for the first time by Stjarnan after a penalty shootout against Breiðablik.

== Calendar ==
Below are the dates for each round as given by the official schedule:

Round	Main date	Number of fixtures	Clubs
First Round	12–14 April 2018	27	54 → 27
Second Round	19–22 April 2018	20	40 → 20
Round of 32	30 April–2 May 2018	16	32 → 16
Round of 16	30–31 May 2018	8	16 → 8
Quarter-finals	24 June-19 July 2018	4	8 → 4
Semi-finals	15–16 August 2018	2	4 → 2
Final	15 September 2018	1	2 → 1

== First round ==
Team 1	Score	Team 2
12 April 2018
Grótta	9–0	Vatnaliljur
Álftanes	9–0	Ísbjörninn
Ýmir	2–5 (a.e.t.)	KV
ÍR	1–0	Ægir
Augnablik	17–0	Kormákur/Hvöt
Berserkir	1–5	Reynir S.
13 April 2018
SR	0–4	Þróttur V.
KH	6–2	Kría
Hvíti riddarinn	2–3 (a.e.t.)	Vængir Júpiters
Mídas	1–4	Elliði
Höttur	1–0	Fjarðabyggð
Léttir	1–0	Úlfarnir
Árborg	0–1	Hamar
Snæfell	2–7	ÍH
14 April 2018
Stál-úlfur	0–2	Skallagrímur
Sindri	2–5 (a.e.t.)	Einherji
KFG	5–0	Afríka
Kórdrengir	w/o	Stokkseyri
Afturelding	6–1	KFR
Vestri	18–2	Kóngarnir
Fram	6–0	Ármann
Nökkvi	0–6	KF
Kári	13–1	Hörður Í.
Njarðvík	10–1	KB
KFS	2–6	Víðir
Álafoss	1–5	GG
15 April 2018
Geisli A.	0–2	Dalvík/Reynir

== Second round ==
Team 1	Score	Team 2
19 April 2018
ÍA	8–0	ÍH
Afturelding	8–2	KV
Haukar	3–1	Vestri
KFG	0–5	Víkingur Ó.
20 April 2018
Selfoss	2–2 (a.e.t.) (4–2 p)	Grótta
Höttur	3–0	Huginn
Léttir	0–1	Hamar
HK	5–0	Álftanes
Kórdrengir	0–2	Njarðvík
Kári	9–1	Elliði
Vængir Júpiters	0–2	Þróttur R.
KH	2–3	Leiknir R.
Þróttur V	1–2	Víðir
21 April 2018
Skallagrímur	0–9	Reynir S.
Einherji	1–0	Leiknir F.
Magni	5–0	KF
Fram	10–0	GG
23 April 2018
Völsungur	7–1	UMF Tindastóll
ÍR	1–0	Augnablik
Þór	3–1	Dalvík/Reynir

== Round of 32 ==
Team 1	Score	Team 2
30 April 2018
Selfoss	1–4	ÍA
Njarðvík	2–4	Þróttur R.
1 May 2018
ÍBV	4–2	Einherji
Reynir S.	0–2	Víkingur R.
Afturelding	1–7	KR
Haukar	1–2	KA
Kári	5–2 (a.e.t.)	Höttur
Þór	3–2	HK
Hamar	3–5	Víkingur Ó.
Víðir	2–4	Grindavík
ÍR	0–5	FH
Leiknir R.	1–3	Breiðablik
Stjarnan	2–1	Fylkir
Völsungur	1–2 (a.e.t.)	Fram
Magni	1–3	Fjölnir
Valur	2–0	Keflavík

== Round of 16 ==
Team 1	Score	Team 2
30 May 2018
Valur	3–2 (a.e.t.)	ÍBV
Fjölnir	1–1 (a.e.t.) (3–4 p)	Þór
Fram	0–1	Víkingur Ó.
Breiðablik	1–0	KR
Stjarnan	5–0	Þróttur R.
Grindavík	1–2	ÍA
31 May 2018
FH	1–0	KA
Kári	3–4 (a.e.t.)	Víkingur R.

== Quarter-finals ==
Team 1	Score	Team 2
25 June 2018
Þór	1–2 (a.e.t.)	Stjarnan
ÍA	0–1	FH
Valur	1–2	Breiðablik
18 July 2018
Víkingur R.	0–1	Víkingur Ó.

== Semi-finals ==
Team 1	Score	Team 2
15 August 2018
Stjarnan	2–0	FH
16 August 2018
Breiðablik	2–2 (a.e.t.) (4–2 p)	Víkingur Ó.

== Final ==
15 September 2018
17:00

Stjarnan	0–0 (a.e.t.)	Breiðablik
Penalties
Halldórsson (penalty scored); Sigurðsson (penalty scored); Hafsteinsson (penalty scored); Héðinsson (penalty scored)	4–1	(penalty scored) Mikkelsen; (penalty missed) Sigurjónsson; (penalty missed) Ragnarsson

Laugardalsvöllur, Reykjavík
Attendance: 3,814
Referee: Þóroddur Hjaltalín
