= Finnur Tómas Pálmason =

Icelandic footballer

Personal information
- Date of birth: 12 February 2001 (age 25)
- Place of birth: Iceland
- Height: 1.90 m (6 ft 3 in)
- Position: Defender

Team information
- Current team: KR
- Number: 7

Senior career*
Years	Team	Apps	(Gls)
2018–2020	KR	31	(1)
2018	→ Þróttur (loan)	11	(0)
2021	IFK Norrköping	0	(0)
2021	→ KR (loan)	10	(0)
2022–	KR	110	(3)

International career^{‡}
2016–2017	Iceland U16	9	(0)
2017–2018	Iceland U17	9	(0)
2018	Iceland U18	2	(0)
2019–2021	Iceland U21	9	(0)
2022–	Iceland	1	(0)
- * Club domestic league appearances and goals as of 1 November 2026 ‡ National team caps and goals as of 14 March 2022

Finnur Tómas Pálmason (born 12 February 2001) is an Icelandic professional footballer who plays as a defender for KR.

== Career ==
A youth product of KR, Finnur Tómas moved to Norrköping in Sweden on 13 January 2021. Finnur Tómas made his professional debut with Norrköping in a 1–1 Svenska Cupen win over IFK Göteborg on 7 March 2021. He went back on loan to KR in 2021 and joined them again permanently in January 2022.

== International career ==
Finnur Tómas is a youth international for Iceland, and was called up to represent the Iceland U21s at the 2021 UEFA European Under-21 Championship.

== Honours ==
KR

- Úrvalsdeild: 2019
- League Cup: 2019
- Icelandic Men's Football Super Cup: 2020
- Reykjavik Tournament: 2019, 2020
