= 2020 Icelandic Super Cup =

Meistarakeppni Karla 2020
KR	Víkingur Reykjavik
1	0
- Date: 7 June 2020
- Venue: KR-völlur, Reykjavík
- Referee: Pétur Guðmundsson
- Attendance: 0

The 2020 Icelandic Super Cup was the 49th final in the Icelandic Super Cup, an annual game between the League champions and the Cup champions. The match was played at KR-völlur in Reykjavík on 7 June.

== Match details ==
7 June 2020
19:15 CEST

KR	1–0	Víkingur Reykjavik
Chopart 31'	Report

KR-völlur, Reykjavík
Attendance: 0
Referee: Pétur Guðmundsson

KR	Víkingur

KR:
GK	1	(Iceland) Beitir Ólafsson
RB	19	(Iceland) Kristinn Jónsson
CB	25	(Iceland) Finnur Tómas Pálmason
CB	5	(Iceland) Arnór Sveinn Aðalsteinsson
LB	11	(Denmark) Kennie Chopart		(substituted off) 61'
CM	8	(Iceland) Finnur Orri Margeirsson
CM	4	(Iceland) Arnþór Ingi Kristinsson		(substituted off) 67'
RW	29	(Iceland) Stefán Árni Geirsson	(yellow card) 37'	(substituted off) 61'
AM	10	(Iceland) Pálmi Rafn Pálmason (c)	(yellow card) 70'
LW	23	(Iceland) Atli Sigurjónsson		(substituted off) 66'
CF	7	(Denmark) Tobias Thomsen
Substitutes:
GK	13	(Iceland) Gudjón Orri Sigurjónsson
DF	6	(Iceland) Gunnar Þór Gunnarsson
DF	18	(Iceland) Aron Bjarki Jósepsson		(substituted on) 61'
MF	14	(Iceland) Ægir Jarl Jónasson		(substituted on) 66'
MF	16	(El Salvador) Pablo Punyed		(substituted on) 67'
MF	17	(Iceland) Alex Freyr Hilmarsson
FW	22	(Iceland) Óskar Örn Hauksson		(substituted on) 61'
Manager:
(Iceland) Rúnar Kristinsson

Víkingur Reykjavik:
GK	1	(Iceland) Ingvar Jónsson
RB	24	(Iceland) Davíð Örn Atlason	(yellow card) 70'
CB	21	(Iceland) Kári Árnason
CB	6	(Iceland) Halldór Smári Sigurðsson
LB	11	(Iceland) Dofri Snorrason	(yellow card) 33'	(substituted off) 62'
RM	7	(Iceland) Erlingur Agnarsson		(substituted off) 62'
CM	20	(Iceland) Júlíus Magnússon	(yellow card) 70'
CM	13	(Iceland) Viktor Örlygur Andrason	(yellow card) 82'
LM	77	(Iceland) Atli Hrafn Andrason		(substituted off) 63'
AM	22	(Iceland) Ágúst Hlynsson
ST	10	(Iceland) Óttar Magnús Karlsson	(yellow card) 73'
Substitutes:
GK	12	(Iceland) Þórður Ingason
DF	17	(Iceland) Atli Barkarson
MF	3	(Iceland) Logi Tómasson		(substituted on) 62'
MF	27	(Iceland) Tómas Guðmundsson
FW	9	(Iceland) Helgi Guðjónsson		(substituted on) 62'
FW	18	(Iceland) Örvar Eggertsson
FW	23	(Denmark) Nikolaj Hansen		(substituted on) 63'
Manager:
(Iceland) Arnar Gunnlaugsson

MATCH OFFICIALS

- Assistant referees:
  - Birkir Sigurdason
  - Andri Vigfússon
