= Reykjavik Tournament =

Reykjavík Tournament
- Region: Iceland
- Teams: 9
- Current champions: Valur (3rd title)
- Most championships: Fram (4 titles)
- 2021 Reykjavík Tournament

The Reykjavík Tournament is an annual pre-season football tournament in Iceland. The tournament involves nine of Reykjavík's top football sides from the top two leagues in Iceland, Úrvalsdeild karla and 1. deild, and uses a combination of group and knockout rounds to determine which team is the winner of the tournament. Currently, matches begin in January, with tournament concluding in February.

Valur are the defending champions, having defeated Fjölnir 1–0 in the 2017 final.

== Champions ==
=== By year ===
Finals by year
Season	Winner	Runner-up
2001	Fylkir	Valur
2002	Þróttur Reykjavík	KR
2003	Fram	Fylkir
2004	KR	Fylkir
2005	FH	Valur
2006	Fram	Víkingur
2007	Fylkir	Víkingur
2008	ÍR	Fram
2009	KR	Fylkir
2010	KR	Víkingur
2011	Valur	KR
2012	Fram	KR
2013	Leiknir R.	KR
2014	Fram	KR
2015	Valur	Leiknir R.
2016	Leiknir R.	Valur
2017	Valur	Fjölnir
2018	Fjölnir	Fylkir
2019	KR	Fylkir
2020	KR	Valur

=== By club ===
A total of 10 clubs have appeared in the final, of whom 9 have won the competition. The most successful club regarding appearances and victories is KR, while Víkingur are the only side to have appeared in a final and not won, finishing runners-up on 3 occasions.

The most recent winner is KR, who defeated Valur 2–0 in the 2020 final.

Final appearances by club
Club	Wins	Last final won	Runners-up	Last final lost	Total final appearances
KR	5	2020	5	2014	10
Fram	4	2014	1	2008	5
Fylkir	2	2007	5	2019	7
Valur	2	2015	4	2020	6
Leiknir R.	2	2016	1	2015	3
Fjölnir	1	2018	1	2017	2
Þróttur Reykjavík	1	2002	—	—	1
FH	1	2005	—	—	1
ÍR	1	2008	—	—	1
Víkingur	—	—	3	2010	3
