= 2017 Icelandic Men's Football Super Cup =

Meistarakeppni Karla 2017
Valur	FH
1	0
- Date: 24 April 2017
- Venue: Hlíðarendi, Reykjavík
- Referee: Ívar Orri Kristjánsson
- Attendance: 440

The 2017 Icelandic Super Cup was the 46th final in the Icelandic Super Cup, an annual game between the League champions and the Cup champions. The previous year FH were reigning League champions while Valur were Cup champions. The match was played at Hlíðarendi in Reykjavík 24 April.

== Match details ==
24 April 2017
19:15 CEST

Valur	1 – 0	FH
Sigurðsson	Summary	Guðnason (yellow card) 27'; Crawford (yellow card) 86'

Hlíðarendi, Reykjavík
Attendance: 440
Referee: Ívar Orri Kristjánsson

Valur	FH

VALUR:
GK	1	(Iceland) Anton Ari Einarsson
RB	3	(Iceland) Arnar Sveinn Geirsson
CB	13	(Denmark) Rasmus Christiansen
CB	20	(Iceland) Orri Sigurður Ómarsson
LB	21	(Iceland) Bjarni Ólafur Eiríksson
CM	7	(Iceland) Haukur Páll Sigurðsson (c)
CM	4	(Iceland) Einar Karl Ingvarsson	(substituted off) 70'
RW	16	(United States) Dion Acoff	(substituted off) 77'
SS	9	(Denmark) Nicolas Bøgild	(substituted off) 82'
CF	8	(Iceland) Kristinn Ingi Halldórsson
LW	11	(Iceland) Sigurður Egill Lárusson
Substitutes:
GK	25	(Iceland) Jón Freyr Eyþórsson
DF	23	(Iceland) Andri Fannar Stefánsson
MF	6	(Denmark) Nicolaj Køhlert	(substituted in) 70'
MF	5	(Iceland) Sindri Björnsson
MF	10	(Iceland) Guðjón Pétur Lýðsson	(substituted in) 82'
FW	22	(Iceland) Sveinn Aron Guðjohnsen	(substituted in) 77'
FW	12	(Denmark) Nikolaj Hansen
Manager:
(Iceland) Ólafur Jóhannesson

FH:
GK	1	(Faroe Islands) Gunnar Nielsen (c)
CB	5	(Iceland) Bergsveinn Ólafsson
CB	21	(Iceland) Böðvar Böðvarsson
CB	5	(Belgium) Jonathan Hendrickx
DM	8	(Iceland) Emil Pálsson
CM	6	(Scotland) Robbie Crawford	(substituted off) 87' (yellow card) 86'
RM	22	(Iceland) Halldór Orri Björnsson	(substituted off) 87'
LM	9	(Iceland) Þórarinn Ingi Valdimarsson
SS	11	(Iceland) Atli Guðnason	(substituted off) 63' (yellow card) 27'
SS	7	(Scotland) Steven Lennon
CF	18	(Iceland) Kristján Flóki Finnbogason
Substitutes:
GK	12	(Iceland) Vignir Jóhannesson
DF	25	(Iceland) Einar Örn Harðarson
MF	10	(Iceland) Davíð Þór Viðarsson
MF	14	(Iceland) Grétar Snær Gunnarsson	(substituted in) 87'
MF	29	(Iceland) Gudmundur Karl Gudmundsson	(substituted in) 63'
FW	23	(Iceland) Veigar Páll Gunnarsson
FW	17	(Iceland) Atli Viðar Björnsson	(substituted in) 87'
Manager:
(Iceland) Heimir Guðjónsson

MATCH OFFICIALS

- Assistant referees:
  - Gylfi Már Sigurðsson
  - Oddur Helgi Guðmundsson
- Fourth official: Einar Sigurðsson
