= Marcus Solberg =

Danish footballer (born 1995)

Personal information
- Full name: Marcus Solberg Mathiasen
- Date of birth: 17 February 1995 (age 31)
- Place of birth: Aarhus, Denmark
- Height: 1.84 m (6 ft 0 in)
- Position: Forward

Youth career
- –2009: HEI
- 2009–2013: AGF

Senior career*
Years	Team	Apps	(Gls)
2013–2015	AGF	13	(0)
2015–2016	Silkeborg	15	(2)
2016	→ Fjölnir (loan)	22	(5)
2016–2017	Fjölnir	21	(3)
2018–2020	Vendsyssel	15	(4)
2019	→ Thisted (loan)	14	(4)
Total		100	(18)

International career
2010–2011	Denmark U16	5	(2)
2011–2012	Denmark U17	11	(7)
2012	Denmark U18	1	(0)
2012–2014	Denmark U19	10	(2)
2015	Denmark U21	2	(0)
- * Club domestic league appearances and goals

Marcus Solberg Mathiasen (born 17 February 1995) is a Danish former professional footballer who played as a forward.

== Career ==
Solberg was born in Aarhus, Denmark, and started his career in the youth ranks at HEI in Aarhus, before he was picked up by AGF, where he earned the nickname "Hulk". He played a number of years in the youth and reserve teams for the club, before making his Danish Superliga debut on 4 March 2013, playing the last 6 minutes in an away match against Esbjerg fB.

In May 2015, Solberg signed with Silkeborg IF on a two-year contract. On 15 April 2016, it was announced that Solberg was sent on loan to Fjölnir for the remainder of 2016, and in November 2016, he permanently signed with the club, despite having six months left on his contract with Silkeborg.

In January 2018, Solberg moved to Vendsyssel FF, and helped them secure promotion to the Danish Superliga a few months later. He was loaned out to second-tier club Thisted FC in late January 2019, as he did not have prospects of playing time for Vendsyssel.

On 10 August 2020, at the age of 25, Solberg was forced to announce his retirement due to an injury that had tormented him for two years.

== Career statistics ==
Appearances and goals by club, season and competition
Club	Season	League			National Cup		League Cup		Other		Total	
Club	Season	Division	Apps	Goals	Apps	Goals	Apps	Goals	Apps	Goals	Apps	Goals
AGF	2012–13	Superliga	4	0	0	0	—		0	0	4	0
AGF	2013–14	Superliga	8	0	1	0	—		0	0	9	0
AGF	2014–15	1st Division	1	0	0	0	—		0	0	1	0
AGF	Total		13	0	1	0	—		0	0	14	0
Silkeborg	2015–16	1st Division	15	2	1	0	—		0	0	16	2
Fjölnir (loan)	2016	Úrvalsdeild	22	5	1	0	0	0	—		23	5
Fjölnir	2017	Úrvalsdeild	21	3	1	0	2	2	—		24	5
Vendsyssel	2017–18	1st Division	13	4	0	0	—		2 (Note: Appearance(s) in Superliga promotion/relegation play-offs)	0	15	4
Vendsyssel	2018–19	Superliga	1	0	0	0	—		0	0	1	0
Vendsyssel	2019–20	1st Division	1	0	0	0	—		0	0	1	0
Vendsyssel	Total		15	4	0	0	—		2	0	17	4
Thisted (loan)	2018–19	1st Division	14	4	0	0	—		—		14	4
Career total			100	18	4	0	2	2	2	0	108	20
