= Nimo Gribenco =

Danish footballer (born 1997)

Personal information
- Date of birth: 23 January 1997 (age 29)
- Place of birth: Denmark
- Height: 1.85 m (6 ft 1 in)
- Position: Winger

Youth career
- Hasle BK
- Fuglebakken KFUM
- Skovbakken
- AGF

Senior career*
Years	Team	Apps	(Gls)
2016–2020	AGF	1	(0)
2019	→ Stjarnan (loan)	12	(0)
- * Club domestic league appearances and goals as of 19:48, 7 January 2020 (UTC)

Nimo Gribenco (born 23 January 1997) is a Danish professional footballer who plays as a winger.

== Career ==
Gribenco played for Hasle BK, Fuglebakken KFUM and Skovbakken as a youth player, before joining AGF as a U-14 player. He was promoted to the first team squad in 2017.

On 23 February 2019, Gribenco was loaned out to Icelandic club Stjarnan for the rest of 2019. Returning to AGF, Gribenco's contract with terminated by mutual agreement on 29 January 2020.
