= Icelandic Men's Football Super Cup =

Icelandic Super Cup
- Organiser(s): Football Association of Iceland
- Founded: 1969; 57 years ago
- Region: Iceland
- Teams: 2
- Current champions: Breiðablik (2nd title)
- Most championships: Valur (11 titles)
- 2026 Icelandic Super Cup

The Icelandic Men's Super Cup (Icelandic: Meistarakeppni karla) is an annual football game between the reigning champions of the Úrvalsdeild karla and the Icelandic Cup holders (or, if the same team holds both titles, between the title-holder and (usually) the team in second place in the Úrvalsdeild or occasionally the second-place team in the Icelandic Cup). It generally takes place at the start of the Iceland domestic season, in May and has been running uninterrupted since 2003 (when the holders of the 2002 titles met). Before that the competition was uninterrupted between 1969 and 1999. Title-holders from 1999, 2000 and 2001 did not play for this title.

The most successful team is Valur with a total of eleven wins.

== Past finals ==
There were two games played in 1996 and 1998, one in the spring and one in the autumn, with the spring-game covering the year before and the autumn-game covering the just-finished season. For easier understanding the years listed are always the year after a team won the Úrvalsdeild or Cup (so the autumn games are listed as having been played the year after they were played).

Year	League Champions	Score	Cup Champions
1969	KR	4–2 ^{3}	ÍBV
1970	Keflavík	2–1 ^{4}	ÍBA
1971	Keflavík	0–5 ^{6}	Fram
1972	Keflavík	2–0 ^{7}	ÍBV
1973	Keflavík	2–1 ^{6}	ÍBV
1974	Valur	0–0 ^{6}	Fram
1975	ÍA	1–3 ^{7}	Keflavík
1976	ÍA	0–2 ^{5}	Keflavík
1977	Valur	2–1 ^{5} ^{8}	Fram
1978	ÍA	1–1 ^{5}	Valur
1979	Valur	3–0 ^{7}	Keflavík
1980	ÍBV	0–0 (4–3) ^{2}	Fram
1981	Valur	0–1	Fram
1982	Víkingur R.	2–0	ÍBV
1983	Víkingur R.	2–0	ÍA
1984	ÍA	1–2 ^{8}	ÍBV
1985	ÍA	2–3 ^{8}	Fram
1986	Valur	1–2	Fram
1987	Fram	0–2	ÍA
1988	Valur	4–3	Fram
1989	Fram	3–1	Valur
1990	KA	1–0	Fram
1991	Fram	1–2	Valur
1992	Víkingur R.	1–3	Valur
1993	ÍA	1–2	Valur
1994	ÍA	4–2 ^{8}	Keflavík
1995	ÍA	5–0	KR
1996	ÍA	1–3	KR
1997	ÍA	3–5 ^{8}	ÍBV
1998	ÍBV	1–3	Keflavík
1999	ÍBV	2–1 ^{8}	Leiftur
2000–2002	Not played		
2003	KR	2–1	Fylkir
2004	KR	0–3	ÍA
2005	FH	2–0	Keflavík
2006	FH	0–1	Valur
2007	FH	1–0	Keflavík
2008	Valur	2–1	FH
2009	FH	3–1	KR
2010	FH	1–0	Breiðablik
2011	Breiðablik	0–3	FH
2012	KR	2–0 ^{8}	FH
2013	FH	3–1	KR
2014	KR	2–0	Fram
2015	Stjarnan	1–0	KR
2016	FH	3–3 (1–4) ^{2}	Valur
2017	FH	0–1	Valur
2018	Valur	2–1	ÍBV
2019	Valur	0–0 (5–6) ^{2}	Stjarnan
2020	KR	1–0	Víkingur R.
2021	Not played due to the Coronavirus pandemic in Iceland.		
2022	Víkingur R.	1–0	Breiðablik
2023	Breiðablik	3–2	Víkingur R.
2024	Víkingur R.	1–1 (4–2) ^{2}	Valur
2025	Breiðablik	3–1	KA

1 - After Extra Time
2 - Penalties
3 - Four matches were played between the two teams. The first finished 1-1, the second 3–0 to KR and the third (listed above) decided the title, with KR winning 4–2. The fourth match then finished 6–1 to KR.
4 - ÍBA (later split into Þór A. and KA) and Keflavík played four matches for the title, twice home and twice away. The first two matches finished 2–0 to the away team with things tied. The third match finished 1-1, with the teams yet tied, and so the fourth match (listed above) decided the title, when Keflavík won 2–1 in Keflavík.
5 - Three teams played each other home and away, the deciding match between teams number 1 and 2 is listed.
6 - Three teams played each other home and away, the deciding match between teams number 1 and 2 is listed. The league champions were third that year (ÍA in 1971, Fram in 1973 and Keflavík in 1974).
7 - Three teams played each other home and away, the deciding match between teams number 1 and 2 is listed. The cup champions were third that year (Víkingur R. in 1972, Valur in 1975 and ÍA in 1979).
8 - The league champions also won the cup.

== Results by teams ==
Team	Winners	Runners-up	Years won	Years runner-up
Valur	11	7	1977, 1979, 1988, 1991, 1992, 1993, 2006, 2008, 2016, 2017, 2018	1974, 1978, 1981, 1986, 1989, 2019, 2024
Fram	6	7	1971, 1974, 1981, 1985, 1986, 1989	1977, 1980, 1987, 1988, 1990, 1991, 2014
Keflavík	6	5	1970, 1972, 1973, 1975, 1976, 1998	1971, 1979, 1994, 2005, 2007
FH	6	5	2005, 2007, 2009, 2010, 2011, 2013	2006, 2008, 2012, 2016, 2017
KR	6	5	1969, 1996, 2003, 2012, 2014, 2020	1995, 2004, 2009, 2013, 2015
ÍA	5	8	1978, 1987, 1994, 1995, 2004	1975, 1976, 1983, 1984, 1985, 1993, 1996, 1997
ÍBV	4	6	1980, 1984, 1997, 1999	1969, 1972, 1973, 1982, 1998, 2018
Víkingur R.	4	4	1982, 1983, 2022, 2024	1992, 2020, 2023
Stjarnan	2	0	2015, 2019	
Breiðablik	2	3	2023, 2025	2010, 2011, 2022
KA	1	1	1990	2025
ÍBA	0	1		1970
Leiftur	0	1		1999
Fylkir	0	1		2003

== See also ==
- Atlantic Cup
- Icelandic Men's Football League Cup
