= Jóhann Laxdal =

Icelandic footballer

Personal information
- Date of birth: 27 January 1990 (age 36)
- Place of birth: Denmark
- Height: 1.81 m (5 ft 11 in)
- Position: Right back

Youth career
- –2007: Stjarnan

Senior career*
Years	Team	Apps	(Gls)
2007–2013	Stjarnan	131	(10)
2014	Ull/Kisa	12	(0)
2014–2020	Stjarnan	69	(2)
2018	→ KFG (loan)	1	(0)

International career
2006–2007	Iceland U17	12	(0)
2007–2008	Iceland U19	2	(0)
2009–2012	Iceland U21	8	(0)
2013	Iceland	1	(0)
- * Club domestic league appearances and goals as of 4 October 2020

Jóhann Laxdal (born 27 January 1990) is an Icelandic footballer who plays as a right back. He's played over 100 games for Stjarnan since breaking into the first-team in 2007. His brother Daníel Laxdal also plays for Stjarnan. Daníel has played the most games for Stjarnan in the Icelandic top league as of 28 September 2013, 107 games, but Jóhann himself isn't far behind, as he's third with 101 games.

== International career ==
On 14 August 2013 Jóhann played his first cap in a friendly against the Faroe Islands.
