= Baldur Sigurðsson =

Icelandic footballer

Personal information
- Full name: Baldur Sigurðsson
- Date of birth: 24 April 1985 (age 41)
- Place of birth: Reykjavík, Iceland
- Height: 1.86 m (6 ft 1 in)
- Positions: Right back; central midfielder

Senior career*
Years	Team	Apps	(Gls)
2001–2004	Völsungur	68	(21)
2005–2007	Keflavík	49	(8)
2007–2009	Bryne FK	22	(1)
2009–2015	KR Reykjavik	124	(33)
2015–2016	SønderjyskE	15	(0)
2016–2020	Stjarnan	78	(14)
2020	FH	14	(0)
2021	Fjölnir	20	(0)
2022	Völsungur	17	(3)

International career
2003	Iceland U-19	5	(1)
2006	Iceland U-21	5	(0)
2009–2010	Iceland	3	(0)
- * Club domestic league appearances and goals as of 11 August 2022

Baldur Sigurðsson (born 24 April 1985) is an Icelandic retired footballer who last played for ÍF Völsungur. He has been capped three times for the Icelandic national team.

== Club career ==
He has played for Norwegian Adeccoligaen club Bryne and Icelandic clubs Völsungur and Keflavík.

On 15 November 2015, it was confirmed that Baldur had signed a 3-year contract with Stjarnan, and would transfer at the end of the year.
