= Vladimir Tufegdžić =

Serbian footballer

Personal information
- Full name: Vladimir Tufegdžić
- Date of birth: 12 June 1991 (age 35)
- Place of birth: Kraljevo, SFR Yugoslavia
- Height: 1.78 m (5 ft 10 in)
- Position: Striker

Team information
- Current team: Vestri
- Number: 7

Senior career*
| Years | Team | Apps | (Gls) |
| 2009–2010 | Metalac Kraljevo | 25 | (3) |
| 2010–2011 | Mačva Šabac | 20 | (5) |
| 2011–2012 | Novi Sad | 24 | (9) |
| 2012–2013 | OFK Beograd | 16 | (1) |
| 2013 | Voždovac | 0 | (0) |
| 2013 | → Sloga 33 (loan) | 9 | (1) |
| 2014 | Gorno Lisiče | 14 | (4) |
| 2014 | Donji Srem | 1 | (0) |
| 2015 | Sinđelić Beograd | 13 | (6) |
| 2015 | Víkingur Reykjavík | 9 | (3) |
| 2015 | Zemun | 7 | (1) |
| 2016–2018 | Víkingur Reykjavík | 44 | (9) |
| 2018 | KA | 8 | (0) |
| 2019 | Grindavík | 12 | (1) |
| 2020– | Vestri | 115 | (27) |
- * Club domestic league appearances and goals as of 2 November 2025

Vladimir Tufegdžić (Serbian Cyrillic: Владимир Туфегџић; born 12 June 1991), also known as Túfa, is a Serbian football forward who plays for Vestri.

== Club career ==
Tufegdžić also played in Iceland for Víkingur Reykjavík, KA Akureyri and Grindavík.

On 22 August 2025, he won the Icelandic Cup with Vestri.
