= Birnir Snær Ingason =

Icelandic footballer

Personal information
- Date of birth: 4 December 1996 (age 29)
- Position: Left winger

Team information
- Current team: Stjarnan
- Number: 11

Youth career
- –2013: Fjölnir

Senior career*
Years	Team	Apps	(Gls)
2014–2018	Fjölnir	64	(12)
2019	Valur	10	(1)
2019–2021	HK	47	(12)
2022–2023	Víkingur	51	(17)
2024–2025	Halmstad	31	(4)
2025	KA	12	(5)
2026-	Stjarnan	27	(6)

International career^{‡}
2017	Iceland U21	3	(0)
2024–	Iceland	2	(0)
- * Club domestic league appearances and goals as of 16 November 2026 ‡ National team caps and goals as of 18 March 2026

Birnir Snær Ingason (born 4 December 1996) is an Icelandic football player who plays as a left winger for Stjarnan and the Iceland national team.

== Club career ==
On 22 January 2024, Birnir Snær signed a three-year contract with Swedish club Halmstad.

== International career ==
Birnir Snær made his debut for the senior Iceland national team on 13 January 2024 in a friendly against Guatemala.
