= Kennie Chopart =

Danish footballer (born 1990)

Personal information
- Full name: Kennie Knak Chopart
- Date of birth: 1 June 1990 (age 36)
- Place of birth: Tarm, Denmark
- Height: 1.85 m (6 ft 1 in)
- Position: Right back

Team information
- Current team: Fram
- Number: 19

Youth career
- until 2005: Ådum I&U
- 2005–2008: Tarm IF
- 2008–2009: Esbjerg fB

Senior career*
Years	Team	Apps	(Gls)
2009–2011	Esbjerg fB	5	(0)
2011–2012	Varde IF		
2012–2014	Stjarnan	39	(8)
2014	Arendal	25	(10)
2015	Fjölnir	11	(6)
2016–2023	KR	166	(23)
2024–	Fram	73	(21)
- * Club domestic league appearances and goals as of 1 November 2026

Kennie Knak Chopart (born 1 June 1990) is a Danish professional football forward who plays in the Besta deildin for Fram. Having previously played for rival Reykjavík side Ungmennafélagið Fjölnir, he transferred to KR Reykjavik in 2016. In July 2016, he scored two goals in a Europa League qualifying game against Glenavon
