= Eyjólfur Héðinsson =

Icelandic footballer

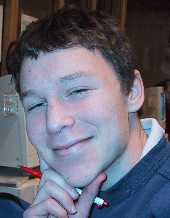

Personal information
- Full name: Eyjólfur Héðinsson
- Date of birth: 1 January 1985 (age 41)
- Place of birth: Reykjavík, Iceland
- Height: 1.86 m (6 ft 1 in)
- Position: Central midfielder

Team information
- Current team: ÍR

Youth career
- 2000: ÍR

Senior career*
Years	Team	Apps	(Gls)
2001–2002	ÍR	15	(0)
2003–2006	Fylkir	53	(1)
2006–2011	GAIS	100	(12)
2011–2013	SønderjyskE	59	(16)
2013–2016	FC Midtjylland	10	(2)
2016–2021	Stjarnan	97	(5)
2022-	ÍR	9	(0)

International career^{‡}
2001–2002	Iceland U-17	10	(0)
2003	Iceland U-19	5	(2)
2005–2006	Iceland U-21	4	(0)
2008–2012	Iceland	5	(0)
- * Club domestic league appearances and goals as of 12 August 2022 ‡ National team caps and goals as of 12 August 2020

Eyjólfur Héðinsson (born 1 January 1985 in Reykjavík) is an Icelandic footballer, who plays as a midfielder for ÍR Reykjavik.

== Club career ==
=== Early career ===
Eyjólfur started his senior team career with ÍR in 2001 before transferring to Fylkir in 2003. After the 2006 season, he signed with GAIS.

=== SønderjyskE ===
After his contract ended with GAIS at the start of 2011, Eyjólfur went for a trial with SønderjyskE. After a week of trial, he was offered a contract. Eyjólfur granted the offer made by SønderjyskE and signed a contract lasting until June 2013. Eyjólfur was seen by the media as a replacement for Rasmus Hansen who had joined Danish Superliga side Randers FC.

=== Stjarnan ===
After 3 years with several injuries and only 10 league matches, it was announced on 18 November 2015, that Eyjólfur would take back home at the end of the year to Iceland, playing for Stjarnan.
