= Egilshöll =

Icelandic sports & entertainment facility

Egilshöllin
- Interactive map of Egilshöllin
- Location: Reykjavík, Iceland
- Coordinates: 64°08′49″N 21°46′10″W
- Capacity: 18,000 (concerts); 2,000 (football); 250 (ice rink)

Construction
- Groundbreaking: 16 March 2001
- Opened: 25 April 2002
- Expanded: 2007, 2010, 2015

Tenants
- Vængir Júpíters (football); Skautafélagið Björninn (ice skating); Skotfélag Reykjavíkur (shooting sport)

Website
- egilshollin.is

Egilshöll (Icelandic pronunciation: [ˈeijɪlsˌhœtl̥], lit. 'Egill's Hall'), also known as Egilshöllin (lit. 'The Egill's Hall'), is a multi-purpose sports and entertainment facility located in the Grafarvogur district of Iceland's capital Reykjavík. It features three football pitches, an ice rink, school sports hall, gym, shooting range, tennis courts and a cinema.

== Events ==
=== Concerts ===
Egilshöllin has also been used as a music venue hosting numerous events of the Iceland Symphony Orchestra amongst others.

Performer	Date	Attendance	Ref
Metallica	4 July 2004	18,000	
Plácido Domingo	14 March 2005	5,000	
Iron Maiden	7 June 2005	16,000	
Duran Duran	30 June 2005	11,000	
Foo Fighters	5 July 2006	Unknown	
Queens of The Stone Age	5 July 2006	Unknown	
Roger Waters	12 June 2006	15,000	

== See also ==
- List of indoor arenas in Nordic countries
