= Ungmennafélagið Fjölnir =

Icelandic sports club

Fjölnir
- Full name: Ungmennafélagið Fjölnir
- Nickname: FJO
- Founded: 1988; 38 years ago
- Ground: Fjölnisvöllur, Reykjavík
- Capacity: 1,030 (700 seated)
- Chairman: Jón Karl Ólafsson
- Manager: Ásmundur Arnarsson
- League: 2. deild karla
- 2025: 1. deild karla, 12th of 12 (relegated)
- Website: http://www.fjolnir.is
Home colours	Away colours

Ungmennafélagið Fjölnir (Icelandic pronunciation: [ˈuŋkˌmɛnːaˌfjɛːˌlaijɪð ˈfjœlnɪr̥], lit. 'Fjölnir Youth Club' (Note: Ungmennafélagið is the definite form of Ungmennafélag, meaning "the youth club".)), commonly known as Fjölnir, is a multi-sport club from Iceland. The club is located in Grafarvogur, Reykjavík. The club was founded in 1988 under the original name Ungmennafélagið Grafarvogur (Grafarvogur Youth Club); however, because another team already had the abbreviation UMFG, the name was changed to Ungmennafélagið Fjölnir, commonly referred to as Fjölnir. A total of nine sports are practised at the club: football, basketball, handball, taekwondo, karate, tennis, swimming, athletics and gymnastics. Chess is also played at the club. Each one of these sports has their own department with their own board but all are under the main board and the club office.

== Football ==
=== Men's football ===
==== Current squad ====
As of 3 march 2025

Note: Flags indicate national team as defined under FIFA eligibility rules; some limited exceptions apply. Players may hold more than one non-FIFA nationality.

No.	Pos.	Nation	Player
2	DF	ISL	Brynjar Gauti Guðjónsson
21	DF	ISL	Oskar Wasilewski
—	DF	ISL	Patryk Hryniewicki
4	DF	ISL	Þengill Orrason
6	MF	ISL	Árni Elvar Árnason
7	FW	ISL	Óskar Dagur Jónasson
8	MF	ISL	Orri Þórhallsson
9	FW	ISL	Árni Steinn Sigursteinsson
11	DF	ISL	Bjarni Þór Hafstein
12	GK	ISL	Haukur Óli Jónsson
13	GK	ISL	Snorri Þór Stefánsson
14	MF	ISL	Daníel Ingvar Ingvarsson

No.	Pos.	Nation	Player
15	MF	ISL	Fjölnir Sigurjónsson
16	MF	ISL	Mikael Breki Jörgensson
17	DF	ISL	Vilhjálmur Yngvi Hjálmarsson
18	FW	ISL	Þorkell Kári Jóhannsson
20	MF	ISL	Egill Otti Vilhjálmsson
23	DF	ISL	Hilmar Elís Hilmarsson
25	GK	ISL	Sigurjón Daði Harðarson
26	DF	ISL	Einar Örn Harðarson
27	MF	ISL	Sölvi Sigmarsson
45	FW	ISL	Rafael Máni Þrastarson
88	MF	ISL	Kristófer Dagur Arnarsson

==== Out on loan ====
Note: Flags indicate national team as defined under FIFA eligibility rules; some limited exceptions apply. Players may hold more than one non-FIFA nationality.

No.	Pos.	Nation	Player
77	MF	ISL	Axel Freyr Ívarsson (at Kári until 31 January 2026)

==== Trophies and achievements ====
- 1. deild karla (1):
  - 2013

=== Women's football ===
As of 30 June 2023, Fjölnir women's football competes in 2. deild kvenna, the third tier of women's football in Iceland.

==== Current squad ====
As of 30 June 2023.

Note: Flags indicate national team as defined under FIFA eligibility rules; some limited exceptions apply. Players may hold more than one non-FIFA nationality.

No.	Pos.	Nation	Player
—		ISL	Alda Ólafsdóttir
—		ISL	Aldís Tinna Traustadóttir
—		ISL	Aníta Björg Sölvadóttir
—		ISL	Anna María Bergþórsdóttir
—		ISL	Elvý Rut Búadóttir
—	GK	ISL	Elínóra Ýr Kristjánsdóttir
—		ISL	Emilía Sif Sævarsdóttir
—		ISL	Eva María Smáradóttir
—		ISL	Ester Lilja Harðardóttir
—		ISL	Freyja Dís Hreinsdóttir
—		ISL	Guðlaug Ásgeirsdóttir
30		ISL	Guðrún Bára Sverrisdóttir
—		ISL	Harpa Sól Sigurðardóttir
—		ISL	Hrafnhildur Árnadóttir

No.	Pos.	Nation	Player
—		ISL	Júlía Katrín Baldvinsdóttir
—	GK	USA	Katelyn Kellogg
—		ISL	Lovísa María Hermannsdóttir
—		ISL	Lára Ósk Albertsdóttir
—		ISL	Marta Björgvinsdóttir
—		ISL	María Sól Magnúsdóttir
—		ISL	Oddný Sara Helgadóttir
—		ISL	Petra Hjartardóttir
—		ISL	Sara Sif Bulinh Jónsdóttir
—		ISL	Tinna Sól Þórsdóttir
—		ISL	Ísabella Sara Halldórsdóttir
—		ISL	Íris Pálsdóttir
—		ISL	Ólöf Kristjana Þorvaldsdóttir
—		ISL	Þórunn Eva Ármann

==== Trophies and achievements ====
- 1. deild kvenna (2):
  - 2003
  - 2006

== Basketball ==
=== Men's basketball ===
==== Trophies and achievements ====
- Icelandic Second Division:
  - 2001–02

=== Women's basketball ===
==== Trophies and achievements ====
- Division I (2):
  - 2007, 2010

== Ice hockey ==
On 28 September 2018, Skautafélagið Björninn folded with Fjölnir overtaking all its departments, assets and debts. On 2 March 2024, Fjölnir women's team won its first national championship after beating SA Ásynjur, three games to one, in the championship finals.

=== Women's ice hockey ===
==== Trophies and achievements ====
- Icelandic Women's Hockey League:
  - 2023–24
