= 2016 Rosenborg BK season =

Rosenborg
2016 season
- Chairman: Ivar Koteng
- Coach: Kåre Ingebrigtsen
- Stadium: Lerkendal Stadion
- Tippeligaen: 1st
- Norwegian Cup: Winner
- Champions League: Third qualifying round vs APOEL
- Europa League: Play off round vs Austria Wien
- Top goalscorer: League: Gytkjær (19); All: Gytkjær (23)
- Highest home attendance: 21 298 vs Molde (28 May)
- Lowest home attendance: 14 142 vs Start (18 September)
- Average home league attendance: 17 585 ▼1.5% (6 November)
- Biggest win: 6 – 0 vs Haugesund (23 July)
Home colours	Away colours	Third colours

The 2016 season is Rosenborg's 26th consecutive year in Tippeligaen, their 49th season in the top flight of Norwegian football and second season with Kåre Ingebrigtsen as permanent manager. They will participate in Tippeligaen, the Cup and the 2016–17 UEFA Champions League, entering at the Second qualifying round stage.

== Squad ==
Note: Flags indicate national team as defined under FIFA eligibility rules; some limited exceptions apply. Players may hold more than one non-FIFA nationality.

No.	Pos.	Nation	Player
1	GK	NOR	André Hansen
2	DF	NOR	Jonas Svensson (vice-captain)
4	DF	NOR	Tore Reginiussen
5	DF	ISL	Hólmar Örn Eyjólfsson
7	MF	DEN	Mike Jensen (captain)
8	MF	NOR	Anders Konradsen
9	FW	DEN	Christian Gytkjær
10	FW	ISL	Matthías Vilhjálmsson
11	FW	NOR	Yann-Erik de Lanlay
12	GK	NOR	Alexander Lund Hansen
14	DF	NOR	Johan Lædre Bjørdal
15	FW	KOS	Elba Rashani (on loan from Brøndby)
16	DF	NOR	Jørgen Skjelvik

No.	Pos.	Nation	Player
18	MF	NOR	Magnus Stamnestrø
19	FW	NOR	Andreas Helmersen
20	DF	AUS	Alex Gersbach
21	MF	NOR	Fredrik Midtsjø
22	MF	NOR	Sivert Solli
23	FW	NOR	Pål André Helland
24	GK	GHA	Adam Larsen Kwarasey
27	FW	NOR	Mushaga Bakenga
28	MF	ISL	Guðmundur Þórarinsson
30	GK	EST	Pavel Londak
32	DF	NOR	Erlend Dahl Reitan
33	GK	NOR	Julian Faye Lund

== Transfers ==
=== Winter ===
In: Note: Flags indicate national team as defined under FIFA eligibility rules; some limited exceptions apply. Players may hold more than one non-FIFA nationality.

No.	Pos.	Nation	Player
9	FW	DEN	Christian Gytkjær (from (Norway) Haugesund)
15	FW	KOS	Elbasan Rashani (on loan from (Denmark) Brøndby)
20	DF	AUS	Alex Gersbach (from (Australia) Sydney FC)
24	FW	FIN	Riku Riski (loan return from (Scotland) Dundee United)
28	MF	ISL	Guðmundur Þórarinsson (from (Denmark) Nordsjælland)
30	GK	EST	Pavel Londak (free agent)

Out: Note: Flags indicate national team as defined under FIFA eligibility rules; some limited exceptions apply. Players may hold more than one non-FIFA nationality.

No.	Pos.	Nation	Player
8	MF	NOR	Morten Gamst Pedersen (Released)
9	FW	FIN	Riku Riski (on loan to (Scotland) Dundee United)
11	FW	DEN	Tobias Mikkelsen (to (Denmark) Nordsjælland)
15	FW	NOR	Alexander Søderlund (to (France) AS Saint-Étienne)
20	MF	NOR	Ole Kristian Selnæs (to (France) AS Saint-Étienne)
37	FW	NOR	Alexander Sørloth (to (Netherlands) Groningen)

=== Summer ===
In: Note: Flags indicate national team as defined under FIFA eligibility rules; some limited exceptions apply. Players may hold more than one non-FIFA nationality.

No.	Pos.	Nation	Player
24	GK	GHA	Adam Larsen Kwarasey (from (United States) Portland Timbers)
26	FW	DEN	Emil Nielsen (loan return from (Denmark) AGF)
27	FW	NOR	Mushaga Bakenga (free agent)

Out: Note: Flags indicate national team as defined under FIFA eligibility rules; some limited exceptions apply. Players may hold more than one non-FIFA nationality.

No.	Pos.	Nation	Player
3	DF	SWE	Mikael Dorsin (Retired)
17	MF	NOR	John Hou Sæter (on loan to (Norway) Ranheim)
24	FW	FIN	Riku Riski (to (Norway) Odd)
26	FW	DEN	Emil Nielsen (to (Denmark) FC Roskilde)
31	DF	NOR	Per Magnus Steiring (on loan to (Norway) Viking)

== Competitions ==
=== Tippeligaen ===
==== Results summary ====
Overall								Home						Away					
Pld	W	D	L	GF	GA	GD	Pts	W	D	L	GF	GA	GD	W	D	L	GF	GA	GD
30	21	6	3	65	24	+41	69	14	0	1	42	10	+32	7	6	2	23	14	+9

Last updated: 6 November 2016.
Source: see below

==== Results by round ====
Round	1	2	3	4	5	6	7	8	9	10	11	12	13	14	15	16	17	18	19	20	21	22	23	24	25	26	27	28	29	30
Ground	A	H	A	H	H	A	H	A	H	A	H	A	H	A	H	A	H	A	A	H	A	H	A	H	A	H	A	H	A	H
Result	L	W	W	W	W	W	W	D	W	W	W	D	W	D	W	D	W	W	W	W	D	W	W	W	W	W	D	L	L	W
Position	12	6	5	1	1	1	1	1	1	1	1	1	1	1	1	1	1	1	1	1	1	1	1	1	1	1	1	1	1	1

Updated to match(es) played on 6 November 2016. Source: see below
A = Away; H = Home; W = Win; D = Draw; L = Loss

==== Results ====
12 March 2016 1	Odd	1–0	Rosenborg	Skien
18:00 CET (UTC+1)	Ruud (yellow card) 6'; Nordkvelle 30'; Jensen (yellow card) 45'	Summary	Reginiussen (yellow card) 62'	Stadium: Skagerak Arena; Attendance: 9,144; Referee: Tom Harald Hagen

19 March 2016 2	Rosenborg	1–0	Strømsgodset	Trondheim
18:00 CET (UTC+1)	Gytkjær 15'; Svensson (yellow card) 89'	Summary	Parr (yellow card) 65'	Stadium: Lerkendal Stadion; Attendance: 16,635; Referee: Tommy Skjerven

2 April 2016 3	Vålerenga	0–2	Rosenborg	Oslo
18:00 CEST (UTC+2)		Summary	Konradsen (yellow card) 35' de Lanlay 83'; Jensen 87'	Stadium: Ullevaal Stadion; Attendance: 15,146; Referee: Svein Oddvar Moen

10 April 2016 4	Rosenborg	1–0	Aalesund	Trondheim
18:00 CEST (UTC+2)	Helland (yellow card) 32'; Jensen (yellow card) 45'; Reginiussen 69'	Summary	Boli (yellow card) 30'; Þrándarson (yellow card) 44'; Carlsen (yellow card) 68'	Stadium: Lerkendal Stadion; Attendance: 16,996; Referee: Ken Henry Johnsen

16 April 2016 5	Rosenborg	3–0	Brann	Trondheim
18:00 CEST (UTC+2)	Vilhjálmsson 36' de Lanlay 69'; Jensen 90' (pen.)	Summary	Karadas (yellow card) 89'	Stadium: Lerkendal Stadion; Attendance: 19,399; Referee: Trygve Kjensli

21 April 2016 6	Tromsø	1–2	Rosenborg	Tromsø
19:00 CEST (UTC+2)	Moussa 37'; Nordye (yellow card) 45'; Moussa (yellow card) 59'; Johansen (yellow card) 86'	Summary	Jensen 45'; Jensen (yellow card) 59'; Konradsen 72'	Stadium: Alfheim Stadion; Attendance: 5,518; Referee: Tore Hansen

24 April 2016 7	Rosenborg	4–0	Viking	Trondheim
18:00 CEST (UTC+2)	Eyjólfsson 30'; Jensen 58'; Konradsen (yellow card) 73'; Þórarinsson 75'; Gytkjær 82'	Summary	Soares (yellow card) 86'	Stadium: Lerkendal Stadion; Attendance: 15,985; Referee: Ola Hobber Nilsen

1 May 2016 8	Sogndal	1–1	Rosenborg	Sogndalsfjøra
18:00 CEST UTC+2	Sarr 9'; Patronen (yellow card) 22' (yellow-red card) 69'	Summary	Konradsen 72'	Stadium: Fosshaugane Campus; Attendance: 4,082; Referee: Tom Harald Hagen

8 May 2016 9	Rosenborg	3–1	Stabæk	Trondheim
18:00 CEST (UTC+2)	Midtsjø 45', 50'; Gytkjær 53'; Jensen (yellow card) 85'	Summary	Mehmeti (yellow card) 53'; Meling (yellow card) 84'; Kassi 87'; Issah (yellow card) 90'	Stadium: Lerkendal Stadion; Attendance: 17,133; Referee: Trond Ivar Døvle

12 May 2016 10	Start	0–2	Rosenborg	Kristiansand
19:00 CEST (UTC+2)	Kristjánsson (yellow card) 22'	Summary	Svensson (yellow card) 70'; Gytkjær (yellow card) 74'; Vilhjálmsson 80', 88'	Stadium: Sør Arena; Attendance: 5,006; Referee: Ola Hobber Nilsen

16 May 2016 11	Rosenborg	2–1	Lillestrøm	Trondheim
18:00 CEST (UTC+2)	Gytkjær 23'; Midtsjø (yellow card) 38'; Konradsen 48'; Eyjólfsson (yellow card) 90'	Summary	Kippe 85'	Stadium: Lerkendal Stadion; Attendance: 21,130; Referee: Tore Hansen

22 May 2016 12	Haugesund	1–1	Rosenborg	Haugesund
18:00 CEST (UTC+2)	Ibrahim 16'; Stølås (yellow card) 90'	report	Konradsen 31'	Stadium: Haugesund Stadion; Attendance: 7,722; Referee: Trygve Kjensli

28 May 2016 13	Rosenborg	3–1	Molde	Trondheim
20:00 CEST (UTC+2)	Helland 1'; Gytkjær 28', 45'	Summary	Elyounoussi 18'; Forren (yellow card) 31'; Aursnes (yellow card) 55'; Gabrielsen (yellow card) 79'	Stadium: Lerkendal Stadion; Attendance: 21,298; Referee: Svein Oddvar Moen

2 July 2016 14	Bodø/Glimt	0–0	Rosenborg	Bodø
18:00 CEST (UTC+2)	Eyjólfsson (yellow card) 56'; Konradsen (yellow card) 68'	Summary		Stadium: Aspmyra Stadion; Attendance: 3,325; Referee: Trond Ivar Døvle

9 July 2016 15	Rosenborg	5–2	Sarpsborg 08	Trondheim
20:00 CEST (UTC+2)	Helland 21', 53'; Gytkjær 50'; Jensen 90'; Rashani 90'	Summary	Kirkevold 37'; Rosted 48'; Trondsen (yellow card) 60'; Glesnes (yellow card) 89'	Stadium: Lerkendal Stadion; Attendance: 15,770; Referee: Tommy Skjerven

16 July 2016 16	Aalesund	1–1	Rosenborg	Ålesund
18:00 CEST (UTC+2)	Boli (yellow card) 74'; Skagestad 90'; Gyasi (yellow card) 90'	Summary	Rashani 2'; Svensson (yellow card) 25'; Konradsen (yellow card) 59' (yellow-red card) 77'	Stadium: Color Line Stadion; Attendance: 6,525; Referee: Kai Erik Steen

23 July 2016 17	Rosenborg	6–0	Haugesund	Trondheim
15:30 CEST (UTC+2)	Gytkjær 17'; Stølås 48' (o.g.); Vilhjálmsson 52', 59'; Bakenga 76', 89'	Summary	Troost-Ekong (yellow card) 39'	Stadium: Lerkendal Stadion; Attendance: 16,901; Referee: Martin Lundby

6 August 2016 19	Lillestrøm	3–4	Rosenborg	Kjeller
18:00 CEST (UTC+2)	Innocent (yellow card) 46'; Knudtzon 52'; Martin 64'; Knudtzon (yellow card) 70'; Ofkir 89'; Kippe (yellow card) 55' (yellow-red card) 90'	Summary	Gytkjær 18', 25', 34'; Midtsjø 39'; Midtsjø (yellow card) 76'	Stadium: Åråsen Stadion; Attendance: 8,371; Referee: Svein Oddvar Moen

11 August 2016; Postponed^{1} 18	Viking	0–2	Rosenborg	Stavanger
19:00 CEST (UTC+2)		Summary	Gersbach (yellow card) 6'; Gytkjær 72', 79'	Stadium: Viking Stadion; Attendance: 7,843; Referee: Tommy Skjerven

14 August 2016 20	Rosenborg	3–1	Sogndal	Trondheim
18:00 CEST (UTC+2)	Midtsjø 15'; Bakenga 37'; Svensson 40'; Midtsjø (yellow card) 53'	Summary	Patronen (yellow card) 33'; Svensson 75' (o.g.)	Stadium: Lerkendal Stadion; Attendance: 15,328; Referee: Trond Ivar Døvle

21 August 2016 21	Brann	1–1	Rosenborg	Bergen
18:00 CEST (UTC+2)	Orlov 3'; Demidov (yellow card) 55'; Barmen (yellow card) 57'; Heltne Nilsen (yellow card) 65'	Summary	Gytkjær 69'	Stadium: Brann Stadion; Attendance: 17,366; Referee: Tore Hansen

28 August 2016 22	Rosenborg	3–1	Tromsø	Trondheim
18:00 CEST (UTC+2)	Gytkjær 21', 64' (pen.); Rashani 90'	Summary	Espejord 70'; Sofien Moussa (yellow card) 83' (yellow-red card) 83'	Stadium: Lerkendal Stadion; Attendance: 17,401; Referee: Svein Oddvar Moen

11 September 2016 23	Stabæk	0–2	Rosenborg	Bærum
18:00 CEST (UTC+2)	Nilsson (yellow card) 81'	Summary	Bakenga 85'; Jensen 90'	Stadium: Nadderud Stadion; Attendance: 4,938; Referee: Svein-Erik Edvardsen

18 September 2016 24	Rosenborg	2–0	Start	Trondheim
20:00 CEST (UTC+2)	Gytkjær 61'; Reitan 90' (pen.); Bjørdal (yellow card) 90'	Summary	Eirik Wichne (yellow card) 85'	Stadium: Lerkendal Stadion; Attendance: 14,142; Referee: Kai Erik Steen

24 September 2016 25	Molde	1–3	Rosenborg	Molde
18:00 CEST (UTC+2)	Sigurðarson 31'; Amang (yellow card) 81'; Hestad (yellow card) 87'	Summary	Jensen 50', 89'; Gytkjær 62'; Helland (yellow card) 90'	Stadium: Aker Stadion; Attendance: 11,348; Referee: Tom Harald Hagen

2 October 2016 26	Rosenborg	3–1	Vålerenga	Trondheim
18:00 CEST (UTC+2)	Reitan 4'; Helland 29'; Bakenga 31'; Þórarinsson (yellow card) 44'; Bakenga (penalty missed)	Summary	Reginiussen 38' (o.g.); Moa (yellow card) 44'	Stadium: Lerkendal Stadion; Attendance: 19,518; Referee: Svein Oddvar Moen

15 October 2016 27	Sarpsborg 08	2–2	Rosenborg	Sarpsborg
18:00 CEST (UTC+2)	Lindberg 14'; Thomassen (yellow card) 21'; Trondsen (yellow card) 48'; Hovda (yellow card) 50'; Tveita 67'	Summary	Reginiussen 45'; Gytkjær 81'	Stadium: Sarpsborg Stadion; Attendance: 4,523; Referee: Tore Hansen

23 October 2016 28	Rosenborg	1–2	Odd	Trondheim
18:00 CEST (UTC+2)	Mushaga Bakenga 42'	Summary	Nordkvelle 32'; Oldrup Jensen (yellow card) 49'; Bentley (yellow card) 87'; Semb Berge 90'	Stadium: Lerkendal Stadion; Attendance: 18,415; Referee: Martin Lundby

30 October 2016 29	Strømsgodset	2–0	Rosenborg	Drammen
18:00 CET (UTC+1)	Abu (yellow card) 19'; Parr 52'; Storflor 78'; Vaagan Moen (yellow card) 89'	Summary	Midtsjø (yellow card) 42'	Stadium: Marienlyst Stadion; Attendance: 7,661; Referee: Trygve Kjensli

6 November 2016 30	Rosenborg	2–1	Bodø/Glimt	Trondheim
18:00 CET (UTC+1)	Bakenga 34'; Helland (yellow card) 40'; Eyjólfsson 60'	Summary	Jonassen (yellow card) 30'; Manzon (yellow card) 44'; Azemi 68'	Stadium: Lerkendal Stadion; Attendance: 17,732; Referee: Tommy Skjerven

==== Table ====
Pos	Team	Pld	W	D	L	GF	GA	GD	Pts	Qualification or relegation
1	Rosenborg (C)	30	21	6	3	65	25	+40	69	Qualification for the Champions League second qualifying round (Note: Rosenborg qualified for the Europa League second qualifying round by winning the 2016 Norwegian Cup. However, since they already qualified for European competition based on their league position, the spot awarded to the cup winners was passed down the league.)
2	Brann	30	16	6	8	42	27	+15	54	Qualification for the Europa League second qualifying round
3	Odd	30	15	6	9	44	35	+9	51	Qualification for the Europa League first qualifying round
4	Haugesund	30	12	10	8	47	43	+4	46	Qualification for the Europa League first qualifying round
5	Molde	30	13	6	11	48	42	+6	45	

Source: Football Association of Norway (in Norwegian), Soccerway
Rules for classification: 1) Points; 2) Goal difference; 3) Goals scored; 4) Head-to-head points; 5) Head-to-head goal difference; 6) Head-to-head away goals scored (between two teams).
(C) Champions

=== Norwegian Cup ===
13 April 2016 First Round	Åfjord	0–3	Rosenborg	Åfjord
18:00 CEST (UTC+2)		Summary	Stamnestrø 55', 76'; Skarsem 86'	Stadium: Åset stadion Attendance: 2,406; Referee: Kent Ove Hammer

27 April 2016 Second Round	Byåsen	1–5	Rosenborg	Trondheim
18:00 CEST (UTC+2)	Kala (yellow card) 66'; Snekvik 90' (pen.)	Summary	Riski 23'; Stamnestrø 29', 63'; Vilhjálmsson 48'; Þórarinsson 68'	Stadium: Byåsen Arena; Attendance: 1,561; Referee: Robert Eggen

4 May 2016 Third Round	Nardo	1–4	Rosenborg	Trondheim
18:00 CEST (UTC+2)	Sevaldsen 50'; Lindgård (yellow card) 54'; Lundal (yellow card) 81'	Summary	Rashani 31' de Lanlay 37'; Bjørdal 66'; Svensson 86'	Stadium: Nissekollen Stadion; Attendance: 1,500; Referee: Mads Følstad Skarsem

25 May 2016 Fourth Round	Rosenborg	3–1	Nest-Sotra	Trondheim
18:00 CEST (UTC+2)	Midtsjø 6'; Vilhjálmsson 9'; Jensen (yellow card) 90'; Helland 90'	Summary	Reitan 7' (o.g.); Walberg (yellow card) 77'; Nissen (yellow card) 79'	Stadium: Lerkendal Stadion; Attendance: 3,473; Referee: Tommy Skjerven

21 September 2016 Quarter-finals	Tromsø	1–1 (a.e.t.) (3–5 p)	Rosenborg	Tromsø
20:00 CEST (UTC+2)	Moussa (yellow card) 39'; Lehne Olsen 53'; Gundersen (yellow card) 56'; Norbye (yellow card) 80'	Summary	Gersbach (yellow card) 51'; Bakenga (yellow card) 80'; Gytkjær 90'	Stadium: Alfheim Stadion; Attendance: 5,285; Referee: Ola Hobber Nilsen
	Penalties
	Andersen (penalty missed); Ødegaard (penalty scored); Sigurðarson (penalty scored); Ingebrigtsen (penalty scored)		Helland (penalty scored); Jensen (penalty scored); Vilhjálmsson (penalty scored); Gytkjær (penalty scored); Bakenga (penalty scored)

26 October 2016 Semi-finals	Rosenborg	2–0	Bodø/Glimt	Trondheim
20:00 CEST (UTC+2)	Midtsjø 22'; Skjelvik 90'	Summary	Azemi (yellow card) 85'	Stadium: Lerkendal Stadion; Attendance: 12,453; Referee: Svein Oddvar Moen

==== Final ====
20 November 2016 Final	Kongsvinger	0–4	Rosenborg	Oslo
13:15 CET (UTC+1)	Holter (yellow card) 31'; Suslov (yellow card) 53'; Ørjan Røyrane (yellow card) 61'; Niang (yellow card) 85'	Summary	Helland 12', 63', 65'; Reginiussen 50'	Stadium: Ullevaal Stadion; Attendance: 26,912; Referee: Tore Hansen

=== Champions League ===
==== Qualifying phase ====
13 July 2016 2nd qualifying round 1st leg	Rosenborg (Norway)	3–1	(Sweden) Norrköping	Trondheim
19:15 CEST (UTC+2)	Skjelvik (yellow card) 22'; Eyjólfsson 48'; Helland 62' de Lanlay 65'	Summary	Blomqvist (yellow card) 64'; Andersson 70'	Stadium: Lerkendal Stadion; Attendance: 11,595; Referee: Davide Massa (Italy)

20 July 2016 2nd qualifying round 2nd leg	Norrköping (Sweden)	3–2 (4–5 agg.)	(Norway) Rosenborg	Norrköping, Sweden
19:15 CEST (UTC+2)	Andersson 57', 77'; Nyman 59'; Fjóluson (yellow card) 70'; Andersson (yellow card) 88'; Telo (yellow card) 90'	Summary	Svensson (yellow card) 15'; Gytkjær 36' (pen.); Yann-Erik de Lanlay 55'	Stadium: Nya Parken; Attendance: 10,372; Referee: Craig Pawson (England)

27 July 2016 3rd qualifying round 1st leg	Rosenborg (Norway)	2–1	(Cyprus) APOEL	Trondheim
19:15 CEST (UTC+2)	Gytkjær 22'; Skjelvik 45'; Svensson (yellow card) 61'	Summary	Astiz (yellow card) 15'; Carlão (yellow card) 36'; Efrem 67'	Stadium: Lerkendal Stadion; Attendance: 13,281; Referee: Slavko Vinčić (Slovenia)

2 August 2016 3rd qualifying round 2nd leg	APOEL (Cyprus)	3–0 (4–2 agg.)	(Norway) Rosenborg	Nicosia, Cyprus
19:00 CEST (UTC+2)	Astiz (yellow card) 72'; De Vincenti (yellow card) 83'; Gianniotas 90' Gianniotas (yellow card) 90'; Vander (yellow card) 90'; Vander 90'; De Vincenti 90'	Summary	Gytkjær (yellow card) 64'; Jensen (yellow card) 80'; Kwarasey (yellow card) 87'; Eyjólfsson (yellow card) 90'	Stadium: GSP Stadium; Attendance: 15,685; Referee: Paweł Raczkowski (Poland)

=== UEFA Europa League ===
==== Qualifying rounds ====
18 August 2016 Play-off round 1st Leg	Austria Wien	2–1	(Norway) Rosenborg	Vienna, Austria
19:00 CEST (UTC+2)	Serbest (yellow card) 47'; Grünwald 51'; Pires 53'; Kayode (yellow card) 72'	Summary	Gytkjær (yellow card) 87'; Reginiussen 90'	Stadium: Ernst-Happel-Stadion; Attendance: 6,090; Referee: Benoît Bastien (France)

25 August 2016 Play-off round 2nd Leg	Rosenborg (Norway)	1–2 (2–4 agg.)	Austria Wien	Trondheim
19:00 CEST (UTC+2)	Reginiussen (yellow card) 28'; Midtsjø (yellow card) 57'; Gytkjær 59' (pen.); Jensen (yellow card) 73'; Rashani (yellow card) 75'; Eyjólfsson (yellow card) 81'	Summary	Grünwald (yellow card) 47'; Grünwald 58'; Serbest (yellow card) 65'; Petar Filipovic (yellow card) 67'; Kayode 69'	Stadium: Lerkendal Stadion; Attendance: 11,692; Referee: Martin Atkinson (England)

=== Club Friendlies ===
6 February 2016	Rosenborg	3–1	Byåsen	Hommelvik
12:00 UTC (UTC+1)	Vilhjálmsson 41', 64'; Hjelle 67'	Summary	Gunnes 73'	Stadium: Abrahallen

13 February 2016	Rosenborg	7–3	Kristiansund	Hommelvik
17:00 UTC (UTC+1)	Stamnestrø 6', 7', 45'; Rashani 30', 62', 75'; Gytkjær 74' (pen.)	Summary	Bamba 4'; Mendy 22'; Berg 32'	Stadium: Abrahallen

17 February 2016	Rosenborg	1–0	Odd	Hommelvik
15:30 UTC (UTC+1)	Vilhjálmsson 54'	Summary		Stadium: Abrahallen

21 February 2016	FC København (Denmark)	2–1	(Norway) Rosenborg	Copenhagen, Denmark
19:00 UTC (UTC+1)	Santander 5'; Verbič 74'	Summary	Helland 56'	Stadium: Frederiksberg

24 February 2016	Rosenborg (Norway)	1–0	(Russia) Rostov	Marbella, Spain
16:30 UTC (UTC+1)	Midtsjø 26'	Summary

29 February 2016	Rosenborg (Norway)	0–0	(Belarus) Shakhtyor	Marbella, Spain
16:00 UTC (UTC+1)		Summary

6 March 2016	Viking	1–1	Rosenborg	Stavanger
18:00 UTC (UTC+1)	Bringaker 77'	Summary	Jensen 27'	Stadium: Viking Stadion; Attendance: 1,600

15 June 2016	Verdal	0–5	Rosenborg	Verdalsøra
18:00 CEST (UTC+2)		Summary	Hou Sæter 64'; Bakenga 27'; Vilhjálmsson 69' (pen.), 87'; Eyjólfsson 70'	Stadium: Verdal Stadion

18 June 2016	Rosenborg (Norway)	4–1	(Denmark) AaB	Trondheim
13:00 CEST (UTC+2)	Gytkjær 59', 88'; Bakenga 65', 75'	Summary	Blåbjerg 42'	Stadium: Lerkendal Stadion

26 June 2016	Östersund (Sweden)	1–1	(Norway) Rosenborg	Östersund, Sweden
15:00 CEST (UTC+2)	Stadler 83'		Helland 40'	Stadium: Jämtkraft Arena

1 September 2016	KIL/Hemne	0–7	Rosenborg	Kyrksæterøra
18:00 CEST (UTC+2)		[ Summary]	Gytkjær (?); Stamnestrø (?); Reginiussen (?)	Stadium: Ånesøyan stadium

== Squad statistics ==
=== Appearances and goals ===
As of match played 20 November 2016

No.	Pos	Nat	Player	Total		Tippeligaen		Norwegian Cup		Champions League		Europa League	
No.	Pos	Nat	Player	Apps	Goals	Apps	Goals	Apps	Goals	Apps	Goals	Apps	Goals
1	GK	(Norway) NOR	André Hansen	22	0	19+0	0	3+0	0	0+0	0	0+0	0
2	DF	(Norway) NOR	Jonas Svensson	37	2	25+1	1	5+0	1	4+0	0	2+0	0
4	DF	(Norway) NOR	Tore Reginiussen	28	4	18+1	2	3+0	1	4+0	0	2+0	1
5	DF	(Iceland) ISL	Hólmar Örn Eyjólfsson	35	3	25+2	2	2+0	0	4+0	1	2+0	0
7	MF	(Denmark) DEN	Mike Jensen	38	8	27+1	8	3+1	0	4+0	0	2+0	0
8	MF	(Norway) NOR	Anders Konradsen	37	4	24+1	4	4+2	0	4+0	0	2+0	0
9	FW	(Denmark) DEN	Christian Gytkjær	39	23	24+4	19	5+0	1	4+0	2	2+0	1
10	FW	(Iceland) ISL	Matthías Vilhjálmsson	42	7	16+13	5	4+3	2	0+4	0	0+2	0
11	FW	(Norway) NOR	Yann-Erik de Lanlay	22	5	16+1	2	1+0	1	4+0	2	0+0	0
12	GK	(Norway) NOR	Alexander Lund Hansen	0	0	0+0	0	0+0	0	0+0	0	0+0	0
14	DF	(Norway) NOR	Johan Lædre Bjørdal	19	1	9+3	0	5+0	1	0+2	0	0+0	0
15	FW	(Kosovo) KOS	Elbasan Rashani	28	4	10+9	3	5+1	1	0+1	0	1+1	0
16	DF	(Norway) NOR	Jørgen Skjelvik	38	2	24+2	0	5+1	1	4+0	1	2+0	0
18	MF	(Norway) NOR	Magnus Stamnestrø	16	4	2+10	0	4+0	4	0+0	0	0+0	0
19	FW	(Norway) NOR	Andreas Helmersen	1	0	0+0	0	0+1	0	0+0	0	0+0	0
20	DF	(Australia) AUS	Alex Gersbach	29	0	14+5	0	5+2	0	0+1	0	1+1	0
21	MF	(Norway) NOR	Fredrik Midtsjø	39	6	26+2	4	4+1	2	4+0	0	2+0	0
22	MF	(Norway) NOR	Sivert Solli	2	0	0+1	0	0+1	0	0+0	0	0+0	0
23	FW	(Norway) NOR	Pål André Helland	31	8	16+4	4	3+2	3	4+0	1	2+0	0
24	GK	(Ghana) GHA	Adam Larsen Kwarasey	14	0	9+0	0	1+0	0	2+0	0	2+0	0
27	FW	(Norway) NOR	Mushaga Bakenga	12	7	5+4	7	2+1	0	0+0	0	0+0	0
28	MF	(Iceland) ISL	Guðmundur Þórarinsson	30	2	15+9	1	4+0	1	0+2	0	0+0	0
30	GK	(Estonia) EST	Pavel Londak	8	0	2+1	0	3+0	0	2+0	0	0+0	0
32	DF	(Norway) NOR	Erlend Dahl Reitan	7	2	3+0	2	2+2	0	0+0	0	0+0	0
33	GK	(Norway) NOR	Julian Faye Lund	0	0	0+0	0	0+0	0	0+0	0	0+0	0
34	MF	(Norway) NOR	Olaus Jair Skarsem	1	1	0+0	0	0+1	1	0+0	0	0+0	0
Players away from Rosenborg on loan:
17	MF	(Norway) NOR	John Hou Sæter	0	0	0+0	0	0+0	0	0+0	0	0+0	0
31	DF	(Norway) NOR	Per Magnus Steiring	2	0	0+0	0	1+1	0	0+0	0	0+0	0
Players who appeared for Rosenborg no longer at the club:
3	DF	(Sweden) SWE	Mikael Dorsin	0	0	0+0	0	0+0	0	0+0	0	0+0	0
24	FW	(Finland) FIN	Riku Riski	6	1	0+3	0	3+0	1	0+0	0	0+0	0
26	FW	(Denmark) DEN	Emil Nielsen	0	0	0+0	0	0+0	0	0+0	0	0+0	0

=== Disciplinary record ===
As of match played 20 November 2016

Number	Nation	Position	Name	Tippeligaen		Norwegian Cup		Champions League		Europa League		Total	
Number	Nation	Position	Name	Booked	Sent off (straight red)	Booked	Sent off (straight red)	Booked	Sent off (straight red)	Booked	Sent off (straight red)	Booked	Sent off (straight red)
1	(Norway)	GK	André Hansen	0	0	0	0	0	0	0	0	0	0
2	(Norway)	DF	Jonas Svensson	3	0	0	0	2	0	0	0	5	0
4	(Norway)	DF	Tore Reginiussen	1	0	0	0	0	0	1	0	2	0
5	(Iceland)	DF	Hólmar Örn Eyjólfsson	2	0	0	0	1	0	1	0	4	0
7	(Denmark)	MF	Mike Jensen	3	0	1	0	1	0	1	0	6	0
8	(Norway)	FW	Anders Konradsen	3	1	0	0	0	0	0	0	3	1
9	(Denmark)	FW	Christian Gytkjær	1	0	0	0	1	0	1	0	3	0
10	(Iceland)	FW	Matthías Vilhjálmsson	0	0	0	0	0	0	0	0	0	0
11	(Norway)	FW	Yann-Erik de Lanlay	0	0	0	0	0	0	0	0	0	0
12	(Norway)	GK	Alexander Lund Hansen	0	0	0	0	0	0	0	0	0	0
14	(Norway)	FW	Johan Lædre Bjørdal	1	0	0	0	0	0	0	0	1	0
15	(Kosovo)	FW	Elbasan Rashani	0	0	0	0	0	0	1	0	1	0
16	(Norway)	DF	Jørgen Skjelvik	0	0	0	0	1	0	0	0	1	0
18	(Norway)	FW	Magnus Stamnestrø	0	0	0	0	0	0	0	0	0	0
19	(Norway)	FW	Andreas Helmersen	0	0	0	0	0	0	0	0	0	0
20	(Australia)	DF	Alex Gersbach	1	0	1	0	0	0	0	0	2	0
21	(Norway)	MF	Fredrik Midtsjø	4	0	0	0	0	0	1	0	5	0
22	(Norway)	MF	Sivert Solli	0	0	0	0	0	0	0	0	0	0
23	(Norway)	FW	Pål André Helland	3	0	0	0	0	0	0	0	3	0
24	(Ghana)	GK	Adam Larsen Kwarasey	0	0	0	0	1	0	0	0	1	0
27	(Norway)	FW	Mushaga Bakenga	0	0	1	0	0	0	0	0	1	0
28	(Iceland)	MF	Guðmundur Þórarinsson	1	0	0	0	0	0	0	0	1	0
30	(Estonia)	GK	Pavel Londak	0	0	0	0	0	0	0	0	0	0
32	(Norway)	DF	Erlend Dahl Reitan	0	0	0	0	0	0	0	0	0	0
33	(Norway)	GK	Julian Faye Lund	0	0	0	0	0	0	0	0	0	0
34	(Norway)	MF	Olaus Jair Skarsem	0	0	0	0	0	0	0	0	0	0
Players away from Rosenborg on loan:
17	(Norway)	MF	John Hou Sæter	0	0	0	0	0	0	0	0	0	0
31	(Norway)	DF	Per Magnus Steiring	0	0	0	0	0	0	0	0	0	0
Players who appeared for Rosenborg no longer at the club:
3	(Sweden)	DF	Mikael Dorsin	0	0	0	0	0	0	0	0	0	0
24	(Finland)	FW	Riku Riski	0	0	0	0	0	0	0	0	0	0
26	(Denmark)	FW	Emil Nielsen	0	0	0	0	0	0	0	0	0	0
			TOTALS	23	1	3	0	7	0	6	0	40	1

== See also ==
- Rosenborg BK seasons

== Notes ==
- Viking versus Rosenborg was postponed due to Rosenborg participating in European competition.
