= 2013 Norwegian Football Cup final =

- Event: 2013 Norwegian Football Cup
Rosenborg	Molde
2	4
- Date: 24 November 2013
- Venue: Ullevaal Stadion, Oslo
- Referee: Svein Oddvar Moen
- Attendance: 24,824

The 2013 Norwegian Football Cup final was the 108th final of the Norwegian Football Cup. The final was contested by Rosenborg and Molde and took place on 24 November 2013 at Ullevaal Stadion in Oslo.

== Route to the final ==
Rosenborg		Round	Molde	
Buvik (D3); A 11–0	Selnæs 13', Moe 17', Dočkal 21', 79', Nielsen 24', 37', Chibuike 45', 73', Elyounoussi 62', 84', 90+2'	First round	Elnesvågen (D3); A 5–0	Coly 25', 30', 35', 60', Agnaldo 51'
Strindheim (D2); A 5–0	Nielsen 18', 73', 80', Chibuike 33', Midtsjø 52'	Second round	Byåsen (D2); A 5–1	Hussain 6', H.Karlsen 13' o.g., Linnes 8', Chima 57', Agnaldo 85'
Levanger (D2); A 4–1	Mikkelsen 4', Midtsjø 20', Nielsen 37', Selnæs 81'	Third round	Hødd (D1); A 2–2 (5–4 p)	Eikrem 90+4', Hovland 112'
Tromsø (TL); H 2–1	Jensen 23', 61'	Fourth round	Ranheim (D1); H 2–0	Hovland 49', Tripić 82'
Vålerenga (TL); H 2–1	Søderlund 78', Bille Nielsen 90'	Quarter-final	Mjøndalen (D1); H 2–0	Hovland 49', Tripić 82'
Haugesund (TL); H 2–1	Mikkelsen 35', Bille Nielsen 58'	Semi-final	Lillestrøm (TL); A 2–2 (5–4 p)	Hoseth 34', 90+1'

- (TL) = Tippeligaen team
- (D1) = 1. divisjon team
- (D2) = 2. divisjon team
- (D3) = 3. divisjon team

== Match ==
=== Details ===
24 November 2013
13:15 CET (UTC+1)

Rosenborg	2–4	Molde
Diskerud 17'; Reginiussen 49'	Report	Rindarøy 16'; Berget 71'; Hoseth 82'; Høiland 90'

Ullevaal Stadion, Oslo
Attendance: 24,824
Referee: Svein Oddvar Moen (Haugar)

Rosenborg	Molde

Rosenborg:
GK	1	(Sweden) Daniel Örlund
RB	14	(Norway) Jon Inge Høiland	(yellow card) 25'	(substituted off) 84'
CB	24	(Norway) Stefan Strandberg
CB	4	(Norway) Tore Reginiussen (c)
LB	16	(Norway) Jørgen Skjelvik
CM	20	(Norway) Ole Kristian Selnæs	(yellow card) 30'	(substituted off) 75'
CM	42	(United States) Mikkel Diskerud
RW	11	(Denmark) Tobias Mikkelsen
AM	7	(Denmark) Mike Jensen	(yellow card) 86'
LW	22	(Norway) Jonas Svensson		(substituted off) 84'
CF	10	(Nigeria) John Chibuike	(yellow card) 33'
Substitutes:
GK	12	(Norway) Alexander Lund Hansen
DF	2	(Costa Rica) Cristian Gamboa		(substituted on) 84'
DF	3	(Sweden) Mikael Dorsin
FW	9	(Denmark) Nicki Bille Nielsen		(substituted on) 75'
MF	18	(Norway) Daniel Berntsen
DF	19	(Norway) Brede Moe
FW	23	(Norway) Pål André Helland		(substituted on) 84'
Head Coach:
(Norway) Per Joar Hansen

Molde:
GK	26	(Norway) Ørjan Nyland
RB	14	(Norway) Martin Linnes
CB	4	(Norway) Even Hovland	(yellow card) 51'
CB	25	(Norway) Vegard Forren
LB	23	(Norway) Knut Olav Rindarøy
CM	10	(Norway) Magne Hoseth
CM	29	(Nigeria) Emmanuel Ekpo	(yellow card) 55'
RW	9	(Sweden) Mattias Moström		(substituted off) 53'
AM	11	(Norway) Jo Inge Berget
LW	27	(Nigeria) Daniel Chima		(substituted off) 89'
CF	8	(Norway) Fredrik Gulbrandsen		(substituted off) 86'
Substitutes:
GK	12	(Sweden) Ole Söderberg
DF	5	(Finland) Joona Toivio
MF	6	(Norway) Daniel Berg Hestad		(substituted on) 89'
MF	7	(Norway) Mats Møller Dæhli		(substituted on) 53'
DF	15	(Norway) Per Egil Flo
FW	20	(Norway) Tommy Høiland		(substituted on) 86'
MF	21	(Brazil) Agnaldo
Head Coach:
(Norway) Ole Gunnar Solskjær

MATCH OFFICIALS

- Assistant referees:
  - Kim Tomas Haglund (Navestad)
  - Frank Andås (Gjøvik-Lyn)
- Fourth official: Trygve Kjensli (Nesodden)

MATCH RULES

- 90 minutes.
- 30 minutes of extra-time if necessary.
- Penalty shoot-out if scores still level.
- Seven named substitutes.
- Maximum of three substitutions.

== See also ==
- 2013 Norwegian Football Cup
- 2013 Tippeligaen
- 2013 Norwegian First Division
- 2013 in Norwegian football
