= 2014 Rosenborg BK season =

Rosenborg
2014 season
- Chairman: Ivar Koteng
- Coach: Kåre Ingebrigtsen
- Stadium: Lerkendal Stadion
- Tippeligaen: 2nd
- Norwegian Cup: 3rd round
- Europa League: Third qualifying round
- Top goalscorer: League: Søderlund (13); All: Søderlund (16)
- Highest home attendance: 20 442 vs Stabæk (16 May)
- Lowest home attendance: 10 709 vs Aalesunds (28 September)
- Average home league attendance: 14 049 ▼5.1% (9 November)
Home colours	Away colours	Third colours

The 2014 season is Rosenborg's 24th consecutive year in Tippeligaen, their 47th season in the top flight of Norwegian football and second season with Per Joar Hansen as manager. They will participate in Tippeligaen, the Cup and the 2014–15 UEFA Europa League, entering at the First qualifying round stage.

== Squad ==
Note: Flags indicate national team as defined under FIFA eligibility rules; some limited exceptions apply. Players may hold more than one non-FIFA nationality.

No.	Pos.	Nation	Player
1	GK	SWE	Daniel Örlund
3	DF	SWE	Mikael Dorsin
4	DF	NOR	Tore Reginiussen (captain)
5	DF	NOR	Per Verner Rønning
7	MF	DEN	Mike Jensen (vice-captain)
8	MF	NOR	Morten Gamst Pedersen
9	FW	FIN	Riku Riski
10	FW	SVK	Tomáš Malec (on loan from AS Trenčín)
11	FW	DEN	Tobias Mikkelsen
12	GK	NOR	Alexander Lund Hansen
15	FW	NOR	Alexander Søderlund
16	DF	NOR	Jørgen Skjelvik

No.	Pos.	Nation	Player
18	MF	NOR	Daniel Berntsen
20	MF	NOR	Ole Kristian Selnæs
22	MF	NOR	Jonas Svensson (Temporary work as RB)
23	FW	NOR	Pål André Helland
24	DF	NOR	Stefan Strandberg
25	DF	ISL	Hólmar Örn Eyjólfsson
30	GK	NOR	Lars Stubhaug
31	MF	NOR	Bent Sørmo
32	MF	NOR	John Hou Sæter
37	FW	NOR	Alexander Sørloth
42	MF	USA	Mix Diskerud

== Transfers ==
=== Winter ===
In: Note: Flags indicate national team as defined under FIFA eligibility rules; some limited exceptions apply. Players may hold more than one non-FIFA nationality.

No.	Pos.	Nation	Player
8	MF	NOR	Morten Gamst Pedersen (from (Turkey) Karabükspor)
9	FW	FIN	Riku Riski (from (Norway) Hønefoss)
30	GK	NOR	Lars Stubhaug (from (Norway) Strømsgodset)

Out: Note: Flags indicate national team as defined under FIFA eligibility rules; some limited exceptions apply. Players may hold more than one non-FIFA nationality.

No.	Pos.	Nation	Player
13	MF	SLV	Jaime Alas (to (Mexico) Ballenas Galeana)
14	DF	NOR	Jon Inge Høiland (to (Norway) Stabæk)
18	DF	NOR	Brede Moe (to (Norway) Bodø/Glimt, on loan)
21	MF	NOR	Fredrik Midtsjø (to (Norway) Sandnes Ulf, on loan)
26	GK	NOR	Erik Bråthen (free agent)

=== Summer ===
In: Note: Flags indicate national team as defined under FIFA eligibility rules; some limited exceptions apply. Players may hold more than one non-FIFA nationality.

No.	Pos.	Nation	Player
31	MF	NOR	Bent Sørmo (from own junior squad)
32	MF	NOR	John Hou Sæter (from own junior squad)
25	DF	ISL	Hólmar Örn Eyjólfsson (from (Germany) VfL Bochum)
10	FW	SVK	Tomáš Malec (from (Slovakia) AS Trenčín, on loan)

Out: Note: Flags indicate national team as defined under FIFA eligibility rules; some limited exceptions apply. Players may hold more than one non-FIFA nationality.

No.	Pos.	Nation	Player
2	DF	CRC	Cristian Gamboa (to (England) W.B.A.)
10	MF	NGA	John Chibuike (to (Turkey) Gaziantepspor)
14	FW	DEN	Nicki Bille Nielsen (to (France) Évian TG)
18	MF	NOR	Daniel Berntsen (to (Norway) Bodø/Glimt, on loan)

== Competitions ==
=== Tippeligaen ===
==== Results summary ====
Overall								Home						Away					
Pld	W	D	L	GF	GA	GD	Pts	W	D	L	GF	GA	GD	W	D	L	GF	GA	GD
30	18	6	6	64	43	+21	60	12	1	2	40	20	+20	6	5	4	24	23	+1

Last updated: 9 November 2014.
Source: see below

==== Results by round ====
Round	1	2	3	4	5	6	7	8	9	10	11	12	13	14	15	16	17	18	19	20	21	22	23	24	25	26	27	28	29	30
Ground	H	A	H	A	H	A	H	A	H	A	A	H	A	H	A	H	A	A	H	A	H	A	H	A	H	A	H	H	A	H
Result	D	D	W	D	W	W	L	W	L	D	D	W	W	W	D	W	L	L	W	L	W	W	W	L	W	W	W	W	W	W
Position	5	9	5	5	4	4	5	4	5	7	7	5	4	3	4	2	5	5	4	4	4	3	3	3	3	3	3	3	3	2

Updated to match(es) played on 9 November 2014. Source: see below
A = Away; H = Home; W = Win; D = Draw; L = Loss

==== Results ====
29 March 2014 1	Rosenborg	2–2	Viking	Trondheim
18:00 CET (UTC+1)	Mix 64'; Dorsin 68'	Summary	Böðvarsson 87', 90'	Stadium: Lerkendal Stadion; Attendance: 16 287; Referee: Tommy Skjerven (Kaupanger)

5 April 2014 2	Aalesund	1–1	Rosenborg	Ålesund
18:00 CEST (UTC+2)	Michael Barrantes (yellow card) 40'; Larsen 56'	Summary	Chibuike (yellow card) 24'; Riski 75'; Dorsin (yellow card) 85'	Stadium: Color Line Stadion; Attendance: 9 049; Referee: Brage Sandmoen (Kjelsås)

13 April 2014 3	Rosenborg	2–0	Odd	Trondheim
19:00 CEST (UTC+2)	Strangberg 4'; Gamst Pedersen (yellow card) 54'; Dorsin (yellow card) 62'; Bille Nielsen 90+4'	Summary	Bentley (yellow card) 65'; Eriksen (yellow card) 69'; Rashani (penalty missed)	Stadium: Lerkendal Stadion; Attendance: 12 263; Referee: Svein Oddvar Moen (Haugar)

21 April 2014 4	Bodø/Glimt	2–2	Rosenborg	Bodø
19:00 CEST (UTC+2)	Ibba 7'; Brix (yellow card) 33'; Olsen 81'; Sané (yellow card) 83'; Badou (yellow card) 90+2'	Summary	Gamst Pedersen 12', (yellow card) 83'; Reginiussen (yellow card) 53'; Søderlund 63'; Jensen (yellow card) 78'; Riski (yellow card) 90+3'	Stadium: Aspmyra Stadion; Attendance: 5 261; Referee: Trygve Kjensli (Nesodden)

27 April 2014 5	Rosenborg	5–2	Brann	Trondheim
18:00 CEST (UTC+2)	Reginiussen 19'; Svensson 28'; Jensen 64'; Søderlund 63' (pen.); Bille Nielsen 89' (pen.)	Summary	Skaanes 14', 60'; Demir (yellow card) 43'; Sævarsson (yellow card) 79'; Badji (red card) 90+3'	Stadium: Lerkendal Stadion; Attendance: 14 378; Referee: Svein-Erik Edvartsen (Hamar)

1 May 2014 6	Sogndal	1–2	Rosenborg	Sogndalsfjøra
19:00 CEST (UTC+2)	Otoo 7'; Hopen (yellow card) 81'	Summary	Reginiussen 28'; Svensson (yellow card) 40'; Søderlund 53'	Stadium: Fosshaugane Campus; Attendance: 4 068; Referee: Espen Berntsen (Vang)

4 May 2014 7	Rosenborg	0–2	Molde	Trondheim
18:00 CEST (UTC+2)	Skjelvik (yellow card) 64'	Summary	Gulbrandsen 30', (yellow card) 59'; Flo 87'	Stadium: Lerkendal Stadion; Attendance: 18 227; Referee: Tore Hansen (Feda)

12 May 2014 8	Sandnes Ulf	0–2	Rosenborg	Sandnes
19:00 CEST (UTC+2)	Lennon (yellow card) 19'	Summary	Søderlund 1'; Strandberg (yellow card) 39'; Reginiussen (yellow card) 42'; Mikkelsen 61'	Stadium: Sandnes Stadion; Attendance: 3 290; Referee: Ola Hobber Nilsen (Nordstrand)

16 May 2014 9	Rosenborg	1–3	Stabæk	Trondheim
19:00 CEST (UTC+2)	Reginiussen 52'	Summary	Brustad 26'; Kassi 73'; Boli 79'	Stadium: Lerkendal Stadion; Attendance: 20 442; Referee: Per Ivar Staberg (Malmefjorden)

19 May 2014 10	Sarpsborg 08	1–1	Rosenborg	Sarpsborg
19:00 CEST (UTC+2)	Berthod (yellow card) 28'; Tokstad 68'; Ernemann (yellow card) 71'	Summary	Bille Nielsen (yellow card) 21'; Svensson 29'; Chibuike (yellow card) 66'; Strandberg (yellow card) 77'; Berntsen (yellow card) 90+3'	Stadium: Sarpsborg Stadion; Attendance: 4 618; Referee: Brage Sandmoen (Kjelsås)

24 May 2014 11	Strømsgodset	1–1	Rosenborg	Drammen
18:00 CEST (UTC+2)	Sørum 52'	Summary	Bille Nielsen 57'	Stadium: Marienlyst Stadion; Attendance: 6 427; Referee: Ken Henry Johnsen (Flint)

9 June 2014 12	Rosenborg	3–1	Lillestrøm	Trondheim
19:00 CEST (UTC+2)	Selnæs 38', (yellow card) 90+1'; Mikkelsen 72'; Riski 73'	Summary	Kippe 55'; Gabrielsen (yellow card) 67'; Høiland (yellow card) 84'	Stadium: Lerkendal Stadion; Attendance: 11 617; Referee: Tommy Skjerven (Kaupanger)

12 June 2014 13	Start	2–4	Rosenborg	Kristiansand
18:00 CEST (UTC+2)	Hoff (yellow card) 33', (goal) 90'; Castro 60'	Summary	Søderlund 20', 53'; Riski 36', 87'	Stadium: Sør Arena; Attendance: 6 559; Referee: Brage Sandmoen (Kjelsås)

6 July 2014 14	Rosenborg	5–3	Haugesund	Trondheim
19:00 CEST (UTC+2)	Jensen 4', 75'; Søderlund 11'; Riski 78'; Gamst Pedersen 82'; Selnæs (yellow card) 90+2'	Summary	Gytkjær 51', 66'; Sema 62'; Stølås (yellow card) 76'	Stadium: Lerkendal Stadion; Attendance: 11 068; Referee: Ken Henry Johnsen (Flint)

12 July 2014 15	Vålerenga	2–2	Rosenborg	Oslo
17:00 CEST (UTC+2)	Berre 57'; Grindheim 75'; Kristiansen (yellow card) 79'	Summary	Søderlund 5'; Reginiussen 41'	Stadium: Ullevaal Stadion; Attendance: 10 332; Referee: Tom Harald Hagen (Grue)

20 July 2014 16	Rosenborg	1–0	Sogndal	Trondheim
18:00 CEST (UTC+2)	Søderlund 24' (pen.)	Summary		Stadium: Lerkendal Stadion; Attendance: 11 323; Referee: Svein-Erik Edvartsen (Hamar)

27 July 2014 17	Molde	3–1	Rosenborg	Molde
18:00 CEST (UTC+2)	Moström 4', (yellow card) 35'; Singh (yellow card) 41', (goal) 63'; Chukwu 55'; Berg Hestad (yellow card) 81'	Summary	Gamst Pedersen 75'	Stadium: Aker Stadion; Attendance: 11 424; Referee: Svein Oddvar Moen (Haugar)

3 August 2014 18	Stabæk	4–1	Rosenborg	Bærum
19:00 CEST (UTC+2)	Boli 23'; Brustad 38' 84'; Rønning 45+1' (o.g.)	Summary	Riski 57'; Mikkelsen (yellow card) 73'	Stadium: Nadderud Stadion; Attendance: 4,206; Referee: Tom Harald Hagen (Grue)

10 August 2014 19	Rosenborg	3–2	Start	Trondheim
18:00 CEST (UTC+2)	Mix 29'; Søderlund 43', 83'	Summary	Asante 17'; Børufsen 26'; Paniagua (yellow card) 42'	Stadium: Lerkendal Stadion; Attendance: 11 513; Referee: Rohit Saggi (Skiold)

17 August 2014 20	Brann	3–1	Rosenborg	Bergen
18:00 CEST (UTC+2)	Mojsov 26'; Skaanes 29'; Pedersen 61'; Badji (yellow card) 63'	Summary	Svensson (yellow card) 52'; Søderlund 60'	Stadium: Brann Stadion; Attendance: 14 573; Referee: Espen Berntsen (Vang)

24 August 2014 21	Rosenborg	2–0	Sarpsborg 08	Trondheim
18:00 CEST (UTC+2)	Søderlund 29', 80'	Summary		Stadium: Lerkendal Stadion; Attendance: 11 433; Referee: Per Ivar Staberg (Malmefjorden)

31 August 2014 22	Viking	1–2	Rosenborg	Stavanger
18:00 CEST (UTC+2)	Sverrisson (yellow card) 10'; Skogseid 76'	Summary	Skjelvik 13'; Jensen 34'; Örlund (yellow card) 86'; Riski (yellow card) 90+4'	Stadium: Viking Stadion; Attendance: 11 693; Referee: Ken Henry Johnsen (Flint)

12 September 2014 23	Rosenborg	3–1	Bodø/Glimt	Trondheim
18:00 CEST (UTC+2)	Svensson (yellow card) 41'; Jensen (yellow card) 57'; Riski 66'; Helland 74' (pen.); Malec 90+3'	Summary	Olsen 50'	Stadium: Lerkendal Stadion; Attendance: 14 374; Referee: Svein-Erik Edvartsen (Hamar)

21 September 2014 24	Haugesund	2–1	Rosenborg	Haugesund
20:00 CEST (UTC+2)	Bamberg 22'; Sema 25'; Haraldseid (yellow card) 46'; Agdestein (yellow card) 62'; Skjerve (yellow card) 77'; Komazec (yellow card) 90'	Summary	Örn Eyjólfsson (yellow card) 24'; Malec 80'; Selnæs (yellow card) 90+4'	Stadium: Haugesund Stadion; Attendance: 4,872; Referee: Omar Rafiq (Teisen)

28 September 2014 25	Rosenborg	3–0	Aalesund	Trondheim
18:00 CEST (UTC+2)	Jensen 6'; Örn Eyjólfsson 42'; Malec 49'	Summary	Arnefjord (yellow card) 45+1'	Stadium: Lerkendal Stadion; Attendance: 10,709; Referee: Trond Ivar Døvle (Svartstad)

3 October 2014 26	Lillestrøm	0–2	Rosenborg	Lillestrøm
19:00 CEST (UTC+2)	Andersson (yellow card) 66'; Riise (yellow card) 88'	Summary	Reginiussen (yellow card) 56'; Helland 68'; Jensen 89'	Stadium: Åråsen Stadion; Attendance: 6 672; Referee: Tom Harald Hagen (Grue)

19 October 2014 27	Rosenborg	3–2	Vålerenga	Trondheim
18:00 CEST (UTC+2)	Helland 26'; Malec (yellow card) 36', (goal) 75'; Dorsin 45+1'	Summary	Kjartansson 10'; Gunnarsson 19'	Stadium: Lerkendal Stadion; Attendance: 14 106; Referee: Svein Oddvar Moen (Haugar)

26 October 2014 28	Rosenborg	3–1	Sandnes Ulf	Trondheim
15:30 CET (UTC+1)	Reginiussen (yellow card) 12'; Jensen 35'; Helland 44'; Mikkelsen 58'	Summary	Rubio (yellow card) 27'; Skjølsvik 79'	Stadium: Lerkendal Stadion; Attendance: 13 457; Referee: Omar Rafiq (Teisen)

2 November 2014 29	Odd	0–1	Rosenborg	Skien
18:00 CET (UTC+1)	Eriksen (yellow card) 80'	Summary	Skjelvik 50'; Helland (yellow card) 71'; Jensen (yellow card) 83'; Eyjólfsson (yellow card) 90+1'	Stadium: Skagerak Arena; Attendance: 11 548; Referee: Svein Oddvar Moen (Haugar)

9 November 2014 30	Rosenborg	4–1	Strømsgodset	Trondheim
18:00 CET (UTC+1)	Dorsin 38'; Jensen 77'; Selnæs (yellow card) 84'; Jensen 86'; Riski 90', (yellow card) 90'	Summary	Kovács 13'; Ovenstad	Stadium: Lerkendal Stadion; Attendance: 17 582; Referee: Tore Hansen

==== Table ====
Pos	Team	Pld	W	D	L	GF	GA	GD	Pts	Qualification or relegation
1	Molde (C)	30	22	5	3	62	24	+38	71	Qualification for the Champions League second qualifying round
2	Rosenborg	30	18	6	6	64	43	+21	60	Qualification for the Europa League first qualifying round (Note: Since the winners of the 2014 Norwegian Cup (Molde) qualified for European competition based on their league position, the berth (Europa League first qualifying round) was passed down the league to Strømsgodset.)
3	Odd	30	17	7	6	52	32	+20	58	Qualification for the Europa League first qualifying round
4	Strømsgodset	30	15	5	10	48	42	+6	50	Qualification for the Europa League first qualifying round
5	Lillestrøm	30	13	7	10	49	35	+14	46	

Source: fotball.no
Rules for classification: 1) points; 2) goal difference; 3) number of goals scored.
(C) Champions

=== Norwegian Cup ===
24 April 2014 First Round	Orkla	0–3	Rosenborg	Orkdal
18:00 CEST (UTC+2)	Sandø (yellow card) 41'; Aakerholm (yellow card) 68'	Summary	Mikkelsen 14'; Reginiussen 80'; Søderlund 86'	Stadium: Orkdalsbanken Stadion; Attendance: 2 810; Referee: Mads Følstad Skarsem (Steinkjer FK)

7 May 2014 Second Round	Kolstad	2–10	Rosenborg	Kolstad
18:00 CEST (UTC+2)	Bjerkan 47'; Mosbakk 76'	Summary	Chibuike 24', 34', 49', 84'; Bille Nielsen 26', 31', 39', 51'; Helland 59', 65'	Stadium: Huseby idrettspark Attendance: 1 750; Referee: Robert Eggen (Trønder-Lyn)

4 June 2014 Third Round	Rosenborg	3–4 (a.e.t.)	Ranheim	Trondheim
18:00 CEST (UTC+2)	Bille Nielsen (yellow card) 31', (goal) 44'; Gamst Pedersen 40'; Svensson 98'	Summary	Åsen 59'; Aas 81', (yellow card) 121'; Bye 101', 107'; Tronseth (yellow card) 102'	Stadium: Lerkendal Stadion; Attendance: 4 881; Referee: Per Ivar Staberg (Malmefjorden)

=== Europa League ===
==== Qualifying phase ====
3 July 2014 1st qualifying round 1st leg	Rosenborg (Norway)	4–0	(Latvia) Jelgava	Trondheim
19:00 CEST (UTC+2)	Pedersen 23'; Søderlund 44', 54' (pen.); Jensen 73'	Summary	Kozlovs (yellow card) 30'; Danilovs (yellow card) 41'; Redjko (yellow card) 54'; Žuļevs (yellow card) 73'; Medeckis (yellow card) 90+1'	Stadium: Lerkendal Stadion; Attendance: 2 700; Referee: Adrien Jaccottet (Switzerland)

10 July 2014 1st qualifying round 2nd leg	Jelgava (Latvia)	0–2 (6–0 agg.)	(Norway) Rosenborg	Riga, Latvia
CEST (UTC+2)	Freimanis (yellow card) 18'	Summary	Jensen (yellow card) 25', (goal) 30'; Mix 73'	Stadium: Olympic Sports Center of Zemgale; Attendance: 1 517; Referee: John Beaton (Scotland)

17 July 2014 2nd qualifying round 1st leg	Rosenborg (Norway)	1–2	(Republic of Ireland) Sligo Rovers	Trondheim
19:00 CEST (UTC+2)	Mix 81'; Reginiussen (yellow card) 90+4'	Summary	Spillane (yellow card) 30'; Gaynor (yellow card) 45+1'; Keane 56'; North 70'; Maguire (yellow card) 89'	Stadium: Lerkendal Stadium; Attendance: 2 902; Referee: Michael Tykgaard (Denmark)

24 July 2014 2nd qualifying round 2nd leg	Sligo Rovers (Republic of Ireland)	1–3 (4–3 agg.)	(Norway) Rosenborg	County Sligo, Ireland
19:00 CEST (UTC+2)	North 13'; Keane (yellow card) 58'; Gaynor (yellow card) 68'	Summary	Helland 17'; Riski (yellow card) 45+2'; Jensen 49', 64'; Reginiussen (yellow card) 58'; Søderlund (yellow card) 58'	Stadium: The Showgrounds; Attendance: 3 792; Referee: Erik Lambrechts (Belgium)

31 July 2014 3rd qualifying round 1st leg	Karabükspor (Turkey)	0–0	(Norway) Rosenborg	Karabük, Turkey
19:00 CEST (UTC+2)	Sow (yellow card) 89'	Report	Dorsin (yellow card) 36'; Lund Hansen (yellow card) 90+3'	Stadium: Dr. Necmettin Şeyhoğlu Stadium; Attendance: 5 000; Referee: Libor Kovařík (Czech Republic)

7 August 2014 3rd qualifying round 2nd leg	Rosenborg (Norway)	1–1 (1–1 (a) agg.)	(Turkey) Karabükspor	Trondheim
19:00 CEST (UTC+2)	Selnæs (yellow card) 2'; Helland 8'; Riski (yellow card) 17'; Mix (yellow card) 67'; Gamst Pedersen (yellow card) 83'; Jensen (yellow card) 90+4'; Reginiussen (red card)	Summary	Güngör (yellow card) 32'; Özmert 35', (yellow card) 74'; Sow (yellow card) 80'	Stadium: Lerkendal Stadion; Referee: István Kovács (Romania)

=== Copa del Sol ===
==== Group stage ====
27 January 2014	Astra Giurgiu (Romania)	1–0	(Norway) Rosenborg	La Manga, Spain
18:00 UTC+1	Yazalde (yellow card) 32'; Seto 59'; Alibec (red card) 90'	Summary	Svensson (yellow card) 40'; Dorsin (yellow card) 67'; Helland (yellow card) 90'	Stadium: La Manga Stadium

30 January 2014	Rosenborg (Norway)	5–2	(Sweden) AIK	La Manga, Spain
16:00 UTC+1	Søderlund 9' (pen.); Helland 32'; Bille Nielsen (yellow card) 35'; Moe (yellow card) 57'; Chibuike 60', 75'; Mikkelsen 81'; Sørloth (yellow card) 83'	Summary	Eliasson 3'; Markkanen 12'; Johansson (yellow card) 20'; Igboananike (yellow card) 24'; Salétros (yellow card) 63'	Stadium: La Manga Stadium; Referee: Antti Munukka

2 February 2014	Costuleni (Moldova)	0–3	Rosenborg	La Manga, Spain
19:00 UTC+1		Summary	Strandberg 56', (red card) 84'; Bille Nielsen 65'; Helland 69'	Stadium: La Manga Stadium

=== Club Friendlies ===
23 January 2014	Rosenborg	2–2	Kristiansund	Malvik
16:30 CET (UTC+1)	Helland 20'; Bille Nielsen 84'	Summary	Ulvestad 13'; Lund (yellow card) 25'; Sivertsen 80'	Stadium: Abrahallen

13 February 2014	Rosenborg (Norway)	2–1	(Sweden) Djurgården	Malvik
19:00 CET (UTC+1)	Søderlund 34'; Strandberg (yellow card) 39'; Nielsen 65' (pen.)	Summary	Broberg 78'	Stadium: Abrahallen

22 February 2014	Rosenborg (Norway)	0–0	(Sweden) Sundsvall	Malvik
16:00 CET (UTC+1)		Summary		Stadium: Abrahallen

27 February 2014	Rosenborg	1–3	Odds	Malvik
16:00 CET (UTC+1)	Gamboa (yellow card) 65'; Chibuike 81'; Nielsen (yellow card) 90'	Summary	Dorsin 20' (o.g.); Storbæk 58'; Rashani 63'	Stadium: Abrahallen

6 March 2014	Rosenborg	5–2	Levanger	Malvik
18:00 CET (UTC+1)	Helland 19'; Søderlund 23', 89'; Nielsen 28', (yellow card) 44'; Chibuike 82'	Summary	Børmark-By 58', 70'	Stadium: Abrahallen

16 March 2014	Kalmar (Sweden)	1–1	(Norway) Rosenborg	Marbella, Spain
17:00 CET (UTC+1)	Ring 36'	Summary	Bille Nielsen 6'	Stadium: Estadio Municipal

23 March 2014	Rosenborg	2–3	Stabæk	Malvik
17:00 CET (UTC+1)	Gamst Pedersen 34'; Rønning (yellow card) 69'; Chibuike 84'	Summary	Boli 16', 44'; Stephens 32' (pen.); Trondsen (yellow card) 46'	Stadium: Abrahallen; Attendance: 600

27 June 2014	Rosenborg (Norway)	2–3	(Sweden) AIK	Trondheim
15:00 CEST (UTC+2)	Selnæs 18'; Riski 63'	Summary	Bahoui 14'; Ofori 78'; Goitom 81'	Stadium: Lerkendal

14 October 2014	Rosenborg	3–0	Strindheim	Trondheim
16:30 CEST (UTC+2)	Sørloth; Rønning	Summary		Stadium: SalMar-banen

== Squad statistics ==
=== Appearances and goals ===
As of match played 9 November 2014

No.	Pos	Nat	Player	Total		Tippeligaen		Norwegian Cup		Europa League	
No.	Pos	Nat	Player	Apps	Goals	Apps	Goals	Apps	Goals	Apps	Goals
1	GK	(Sweden) SWE	Daniel Örlund	17	0	12+2	0	2+0	0	1+0	0
3	DF	(Sweden) SWE	Mikael Dorsin	33	3	23+2	3	1+2	0	5+0	0
4	DF	(Norway) NOR	Tore Reginiussen	32	5	24+0	4	1+1	1	6+0	0
5	DF	(Norway) NOR	Per Verner Rønning	7	0	3+1	0	2+0	0	1+0	0
7	MF	(Denmark) DEN	Mike Jensen	36	13	29+0	9	1+0	0	6+0	4
8	MF	(Norway) NOR	Morten Gamst Pedersen	32	5	19+5	3	2+0	1	4+2	1
9	FW	(Finland) FIN	Riku Riski	37	8	25+4	8	2+0	0	6+0	0
10	FW	(Slovakia) SVK	Tomáš Malec	10	4	6+4	4	0+0	0	0+0	0
11	FW	(Denmark) DEN	Tobias Mikkelsen	33	4	14+12	3	3+0	1	4+0	0
12	GK	(Norway) NOR	Alexander Lund Hansen	22	0	17+0	0	0+0	0	5+0	0
15	FW	(Norway) NOR	Alexander Søderlund	31	16	16+7	13	1+2	1	4+1	2
16	DF	(Norway) NOR	Jørgen Skjelvik	35	2	21+7	2	2+0	0	4+1	0
20	MF	(Norway) NOR	Ole Kristian Selnæs	28	1	19+1	1	2+0	0	4+2	0
22	MF	(Norway) NOR	Jonas Svensson	27	3	23+0	2	1+0	1	2+1	0
23	FW	(Norway) NOR	Pål André Helland	27	8	11+10	4	1+1	2	4+0	2
24	DF	(Norway) NOR	Stefan Strandberg	27	1	18+2	1	2+0	0	5+0	0
25	DF	(Iceland) ISL	Hólmar Örn Eyjólfsson	10	1	8+2	1	0+0	0	0+0	0
30	GK	(Norway) NOR	Lars Stubhaug	1	0	0+0	0	1+0	0	0+0	0
31	MF	(Norway) NOR	Bent Sørmo	1	0	0+0	0	0+0	0	0+1	0
32	MF	(Norway) NOR	John Hou Sæter	1	0	0+1	0	0+0	0	0+0	0
37	FW	(Norway) NOR	Alexander Sørloth	9	0	2+4	0	0+0	0	0+3	0
42	MF	(United States) USA	Mix Diskerud	27	4	19+3	2	0+0	0	3+2	2
Players away from Rosenborg on loan:
18	MF	(Norway) NOR	Daniel Berntsen	16	0	8+2	0	3+0	0	2+1	0
21	MF	(Norway) NOR	Fredrik Midtsjø	0	0	0+0	0	0+0	0	0+0	0
Players who left Rosenborg during the season:
2	DF	(Costa Rica) CRC	Cristian Gamboa	2	0	2+0	0	0+0	0	0+0	0
10	MF	(Nigeria) NGA	John Chibuike	10	4	3+5	0	2+0	4	0+0	0
14	FW	(Denmark) DEN	Nicki Bille Nielsen	13	8	6+5	3	2+0	5	0+0	0

=== Disciplinary record ===
As of match played 9 November 2014

Number	Nation	Position	Name	Tippeligaen		Norwegian Cup		Europa League		Total	
Number	Nation	Position	Name	Booked	Sent off (straight red)	Booked	Sent off (straight red)	Booked	Sent off (straight red)	Booked	Sent off (straight red)
1	(Sweden)	GK	Daniel Örlund	1	0	0	0	0	0	0	0
2	(Costa Rica)	DF	Cristian Gamboa	0	0	0	0	0	0	0	0
3	(Sweden)	DF	Mikael Dorsin	2	0	0	0	1	0	3	0
4	(Norway)	DF	Tore Reginiussen	4	0	0	0	2	1	6	1
5	(Norway)	DF	Per Verner Rønning	0	0	0	0	0	0	0	0
7	(Denmark)	MF	Mike Jensen	4	0	0	0	2	0	5	0
8	(Norway)	MF	Morten Gamst Pedersen	2	0	0	0	1	0	3	0
9	(Finland)	FW	Riku Riski	3	0	0	0	2	0	5	0
10	(Slovakia)	FW	Tomáš Malec	1	0	0	0	0	0	0	0
11	(Denmark)	FW	Tobias Mikkelsen	1	0	0	0	0	0	1	0
12	(Norway)	GK	Alexander Lund Hansen	0	0	0	0	1	0	1	0
14	(Denmark)	FW	Nicki Bille Nielsen	1	0	1	0	0	0	2	0
15	(Norway)	FW	Alexander Søderlund	0	0	0	0	1	0	1	0
16	(Norway)	DF	Jørgen Skjelvik	1	0	0	0	0	0	1	0
18	(Norway)	MF	Daniel Berntsen	1	0	0	0	0	0	1	0
20	(Norway)	MF	Ole Kristian Selnæs	4	0	0	0	1	0	5	0
22	(Norway)	MF	Jonas Svensson	3	0	0	0	0	0	2	0
23	(Norway)	FW	Pål André Helland	1	0	0	0	0	0	1	0
24	(Norway)	DF	Stefan Strandberg	2	0	0	0	0	0	2	0
25	(Iceland)	DF	Hólmar Örn Eyjólfsson	2	0	0	0	0	0	2	0
30	(Norway)	GK	Lars Stubhaug	0	0	0	0	0	0	0	0
31	(Norway)	MF	Bent Sørmo	0	0	0	0	0	0	0	0
37	(Norway)	FW	Alexander Sørloth	0	0	0	0	0	0	0	0
42	(United States)	MF	Mix Diskerud	0	0	0	0	1	0	1	0
			TOTALS	35	0	1	0	12	1	48	1
