= Jonas Svensson (footballer) =

Norwegian footballer (born 1993)

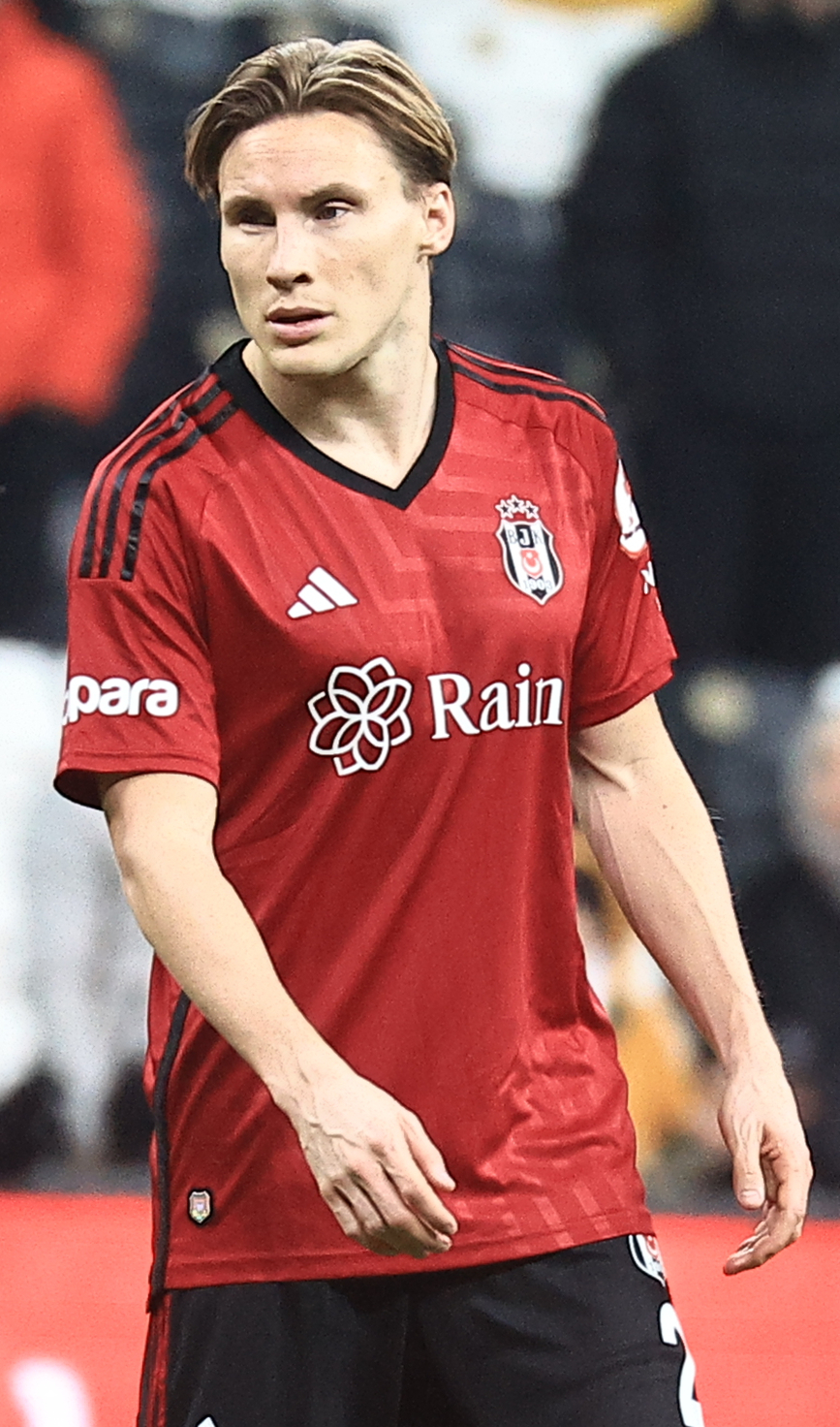
- Jonas Svensson in 2024

Personal information
- Full name: Jonas Svensson
- Date of birth: 6 March 1993 (age 33)
- Place of birth: Verdal Municipality, Norway
- Height: 1.70 m (5 ft 7 in)
- Position: Right-back

Team information
- Current team: Rosenborg
- Number: 22

Youth career
- –2008: Verdal

Senior career*
Years	Team	Apps	(Gls)
2008–2009	Levanger	14	(1)
2009–2017	Rosenborg	157	(11)
2017–2021	AZ	119	(5)
2021–2024	Adana Demirspor	76	(0)
2024–2026	Beşiktaş	46	(0)
2026–	Rosenborg	19	(2)

International career^{‡}
2008	Norway U15	4	(0)
2009	Norway U16	10	(0)
2010	Norway U17	11	(0)
2011	Norway U18	12	(0)
2012	Norway U19	6	(0)
2012	Norway U21	16	(0)
2013–2015	Norway U23	3	(0)
2015–2021	Norway	23	(1)
- * Club domestic league appearances and goals as of 22 November 2026 ‡ National team caps and goals as of 2 June 2021

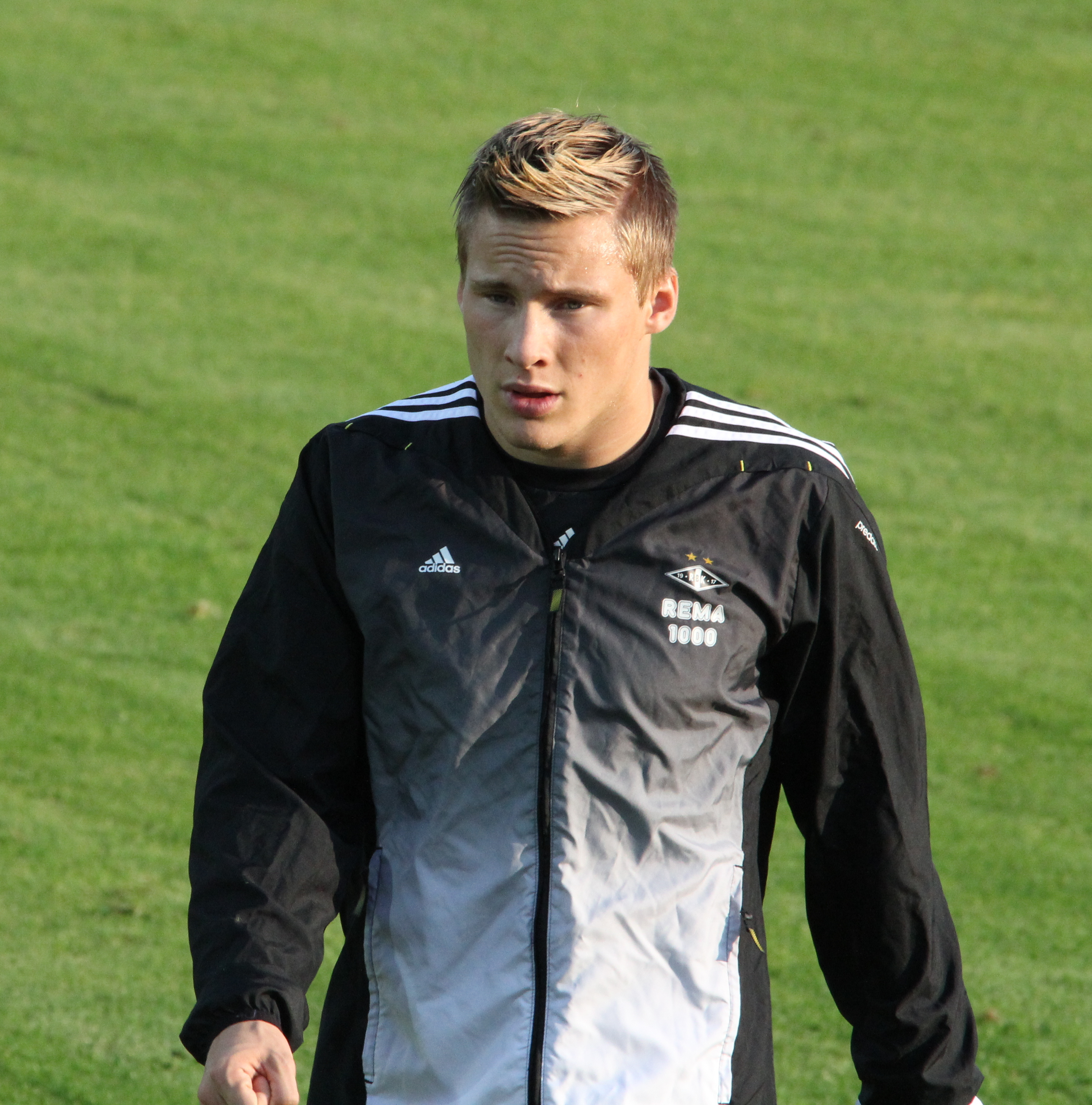
Svensson in 2013

Jonas Svensson (born 6 March 1993) is a Norwegian professional footballer who plays for Eliteserien club Rosenborg. Originally a midfielder, Svensson was converted to right-back in 2014.

== Club career ==
As a 15- and 16-year-old, Svensson played several games in the 2. divisjon for Levanger. In August 2009, Svensson moved to Rosenborg. His debut came on 10 March 2011 in Rosenborg's 4–4 draw against Lillestrøm. He then made his first league start against Haugesund, replacing the injured Michael Jamtfall. He signed a professional contract with Rosenborg in June 2011 until the end of the 2013 season.

In Rosenborg's 4–0 win over Sarpsborg 08 on 3 June 2011, Svensson scored two goals. On 13 July 2011, he made his European debut against Icelandic side Breiðablik in the Champions League Second qualifying round.

During the 2014 season, with Cristian Gamboa struggling with injury and later attending the World Cup, Svensson stepped in as a right-back for Rosenborg, and he did so with success. After Gamboa's move to West Bromwich Albion following an impressive world cup with Costa Rica, he continued to play right-back throughout the rest of the season. After the season, he made the decision to switch from midfield to right-back permanently.

On 20 April 2016, Svensson reached 200 games for Rosenborg at the age of 23 years and 45 days, making him the youngest player for the club to do so, and beating Per Ciljan Skjelbred's record by 14 days.

On 30 January 2017, Svensson signed for AZ.

On 10 July 2021, Svensson signed a three-year deal with the newly promoted Süper Lig side Adana Demirspor.

On 10 January 2024, Svensson signed a two-year deal with fellow Süper Lig club Beşiktaş

On 8 January 2026, Svensson signed a two-year deal with Eliteserien club Rosenborg.

== International career ==
Svensson made his senior team debut for Norway, after a few matches as non-playing sub, on 1 June 2016, in a 3–2 win over Iceland.

== Career statistics ==
=== Club ===
As of match played 22 November 2026

Appearances and goals by club, season and competition
Club	Season	League			National cup (Note: Includes Norwegian Football Cup, KNVB Cup, Turkish Cup)		Continental		Other		Total	
Club	Season	Division	Apps	Goals	Apps	Goals	Apps	Goals	Apps	Goals	Apps	Goals
Levanger	2008	Norwegian Second Division	10	0	0	0	–		–		10	0
Levanger	2009	Norwegian Second Division	4	1	1	0	–		–		5	1
Levanger	Total		14	1	1	0	–		–		15	1
Rosenborg	2010	Eliteserien	0	0	1	0	–		–		1	0
Rosenborg	2011	Eliteserien	25	2	4	1	6 (Note: Four appearances in UEFA Champions League, two appearances in UEFA Europa League)	0	–		35	3
Rosenborg	2012	Eliteserien	27	3	4	2	14 (Note: Appearances in UEFA Europa League)	0	–		45	5
Rosenborg	2013	Eliteserien	27	3	5	0	4	2	–		36	5
Rosenborg	2014	Eliteserien	23	2	1	1	3	0	–		27	3
Rosenborg	2015	Eliteserien	29	0	7	0	14	1	–		50	1
Rosenborg	2016	Eliteserien	26	1	5	1	6 (Note: Four appearances in UEFA Champions League, two appearances in UEFA Europa League)	0	–		37	2
Rosenborg	Total		157	11	27	5	47	3	–		231	19
AZ	2016–17	Eredivisie	13	0	1	0	–		–		14	0
AZ	2017–18	Eredivisie	32	3	6	1	–		–		38	4
AZ	2018–19	Eredivisie	32	1	4	0	2	0	–		38	1
AZ	2019–20	Eredivisie	24	1	2	0	12	0	–		38	1
AZ	2020–21	Eredivisie	18	0	0	0	6 (Note: Two appearances in UEFA Champions League, four appearances in UEFA Europa League)	0	–		24	0
AZ	Total		119	5	13	1	20	0	–		152	6
Adana Demirspor	2021–22	Süper Lig	33	0	2	0	–		–		35	0
Adana Demirspor	2022–23	Süper Lig	29	0	0	0	–		–		29	0
Adana Demirspor	2023–24	Süper Lig	14	0	0	0	6 (Note: Appearances in UEFA Europa Conference League)	1	–		20	1
Adana Demirspor	Total		76	0	2	0	6	1	–		84	1
Beşiktaş	2023–24	Süper Lig	10	0	5	0	–		–		15	0
Beşiktaş	2024–25	Süper Lig	31	0	4	0	10	0	1 (Note: Appearance in Turkish Super Cup)	1	46	1
Beşiktaş	2025–26	Süper Lig	5	0	0	0	5	0	0	0	10	0
Beşiktaş	Total		46	0	9	0	15	0	1	1	71	1
Rosenborg	2026	Eliteserien	19	2	2	0	–		–		21	2
Career total			431	19	55	6	88	4	1	1	575	30

=== International ===
As of match played 2 June 2021

Appearances and goals by national team and year
National team	Year	Apps	Goals
Norway	2016	6	0
Norway	2017	8	0
Norway	2018	2	0
Norway	2019	1	0
Norway	2020	2	0
Norway	2021	4	1
Total		23	1

Scores and results list Norway's goal tally first, score column indicates score after each Svensson goal.

List of international goals scored by Jonas Svensson
No.	Date	Venue	Opponent	Score	Result	Competition
1	24 March 2021	Victoria Stadium, Gibraltar	Gibraltar	3–0	3–0	2022 FIFA World Cup qualification

== Honours ==
Rosenborg

- Eliteserien: 2015, 2016
- Norwegian Cup: 2015, 2016

Besiktas

- Turkish Cup: 2023–24
- Turkish Super Cup: 2024

Individual

- Eliteserien Defender of the Year: 2015, 2016
- Eredivisie Player of the Month: January 2018
