= Sivert Solli =

Norwegian footballer (born 1997)

Personal information
- Date of birth: 28 July 1997 (age 29)
- Place of birth: Brekstad, Norway
- Height: 1.75 m (5 ft 9 in)
- Position: Midfielder

Team information
- Current team: Brattvåg
- Number: 23

Youth career
- –2013: Ørland
- 2013–2015: Rosenborg

Senior career*
Years	Team	Apps	(Gls)
2015–2017	Rosenborg	1	(0)
2017	→ Elverum (loan)	26	(1)
2018–2024	Ranheim	136	(12)
2019	→ Stjørdals-Blink (loan)	22	(4)
2025–	Brattvåg	41	(7)

International career
2013	Norway U-16	3	(0)
2014	Norway U-17	2	(0)
2015	Norway U-18	11	(0)
2016	Norway U-19	1	(0)
- * Club domestic league appearances and goals as of 15 November 2026

Sivert Solli (born 28 July 1997) is a Norwegian footballer who plays in midfield for Brattvåg.

== Career ==
Sivert Solli made his debut for Rosenborg coming on for the second half in a 3-0 win in a cup game against Vuku. A few months later, after impressing during training with the first team Sivert Solli was awarded with a first team contract on July 8, 2015.

In November 2015 Solli, alongside teammates Andreas Helmersen and John Hou Sæter, became the first players in Norwegian football history to having won the Under-16, Under-19 and the senior Norwegian Football Cup. Solli won the Under-16 Cup in 2013 and then the Under-19 and the senior cup in 2015.

Solli made his league debut for Rosenborg against Vålerenga 2 October 2016, coming on for Guðmundur Þórarinsson after 84 minutes in a game Rosenborg won 3-1.

In January 2017, Solli was sent out on loan to Elverum in the Norwegian First Division. Solli was loaned out to IL Stjørdals-Blink for the 2019 season.

On 19 December 2017, Solli signed for Ranheim

== Career statistics ==
As of 19 February 2025

Season	Club	Division	League		Cup		Europe		Total	
Season	Club	Division	Apps	Goals	Apps	Goals	Apps	Goals	Apps	Goals
2015	Rosenborg	Tippeligaen	0	0	4	0	1	0	5	0
2016	Rosenborg	Tippeligaen	1	0	1	0	0	0	2	0
2017	Elverum (loan)	OBOS-ligaen	26	1	1	0	0	0	27	1
2018	Ranheim	Eliteserien	8	0	2	1	0	0	10	1
2019	Stjørdals-Blink (loan)	PostNord-ligaen	22	4	2	1	0	0	24	5
2020	Ranheim	OBOS-ligaen	28	2	0	0	0	0	28	2
2021	Ranheim	OBOS-ligaen	26	4	3	0	0	0	29	4
2022	Ranheim	OBOS-ligaen	27	2	2	0	0	0	29	2
2023	Ranheim	OBOS-ligaen	24	4	1	0	0	0	25	4
2024	Ranheim	OBOS-ligaen	23	0	2	1	0	0	25	1
Career Total			184	17	18	3	1	0	203	20

== Honours ==
=== Club ===
Rosenborg

- Norwegian Football Cup (2): 2015, 2016
- Norwegian U-19 Championship (1): 2015
- Norwegian U-16 Championship (1): 2013
