= Åfjord IL =

Norwegian sports club

Åfjord
- Full name: Åfjord Idrettslag
- Founded: 1923
- Ground: Åset stadion Åfjord Municipality
- Chairman: Astrid Lomsdal Frønes
- Head Coach: Roar Harbak
- League: Men: 5. divisjon Trøndelag avd. 1 (tier 6)
- 2018: Men: 5. divisjon Trøndelag avd. 2 (tier 6), 3rd
Home colours

Åfjord Idrettslag is a Norwegian sports club from Åfjord Municipality on the Fosen peninsula in Trøndelag county. The club was founded in 1923 and has sections for both association football, team handball, Nordic skiing and athletics. The men's football team plays in the Fifth Division, having last played in the Norwegian Third Division in 2012, while the senior team in the Women's Handball plays in the Third Division.

Former players included Alexander Lund Hansen and Øyvind Svenning, footballers.

== Recent seasons ==
=== Men ===
Season	Level	Division	Section	Position	Movements	Source
2000	Tier 6	5. divisjon	Trøndelag avd. 2	5th/8		
2001	Tier 6	5. divisjon	Trøndelag avd. 8	3rd/10		
2002	Tier 6	5. divisjon	Trøndelag avd. 7	6th/9		
2003	did not participate					
2004	Tier 6	5. divisjon	Trøndelag avd. 9	5th/8		
2005	Tier 6	5. divisjon	Trøndelag avd. 6	2nd/8		
2006	Tier 6	5. divisjon	Trøndelag avd. 5	2nd/9		
2007	Tier 6	5. divisjon	Trøndelag avd. 7	2nd/8		
2008	Tier 6	5. divisjon	Trøndelag avd. 6	2nd/8		
2009	Tier 6	5. divisjon	Trøndelag avd. 5	1st/8	Promoted	
2010	Tier 5	4. divisjon	Trøndelag avd. 2	3rd/9		
2011	Tier 5	4. divisjon	Trøndelag avd. 1	1st/12	Promoted	
2012	Tier 4	3. divisjon	Trøndelag avd. 10	14th/14	Relegated	
2013	Tier 5	4. divisjon	Trøndelag avd. 1	2nd/12	Promoted	
2014	Tier 4	3. divisjon	Trøndelag avd. 10	10th/14		
2015	Tier 4	3. divisjon	Trøndelag avd. 10	14th/14	Relegated	
2016	Tier 5	4. divisjon	Trøndelag avd. 1	11th/12	Relegated	
2017	Tier 6	5. divisjon	Trøndelag avd. 3	5th/10		
2018	Tier 6	5. divisjon	Trøndelag avd. 2	3rd/10		

=== Women ===
Season	Level	Division	Section	Position	Movements	Source
2011	Tier 4	3. divisjon	Trøndelag avd. 2	-/10	Resigned	
