= Tore Reginiussen =

Norwegian football player (born 1986)

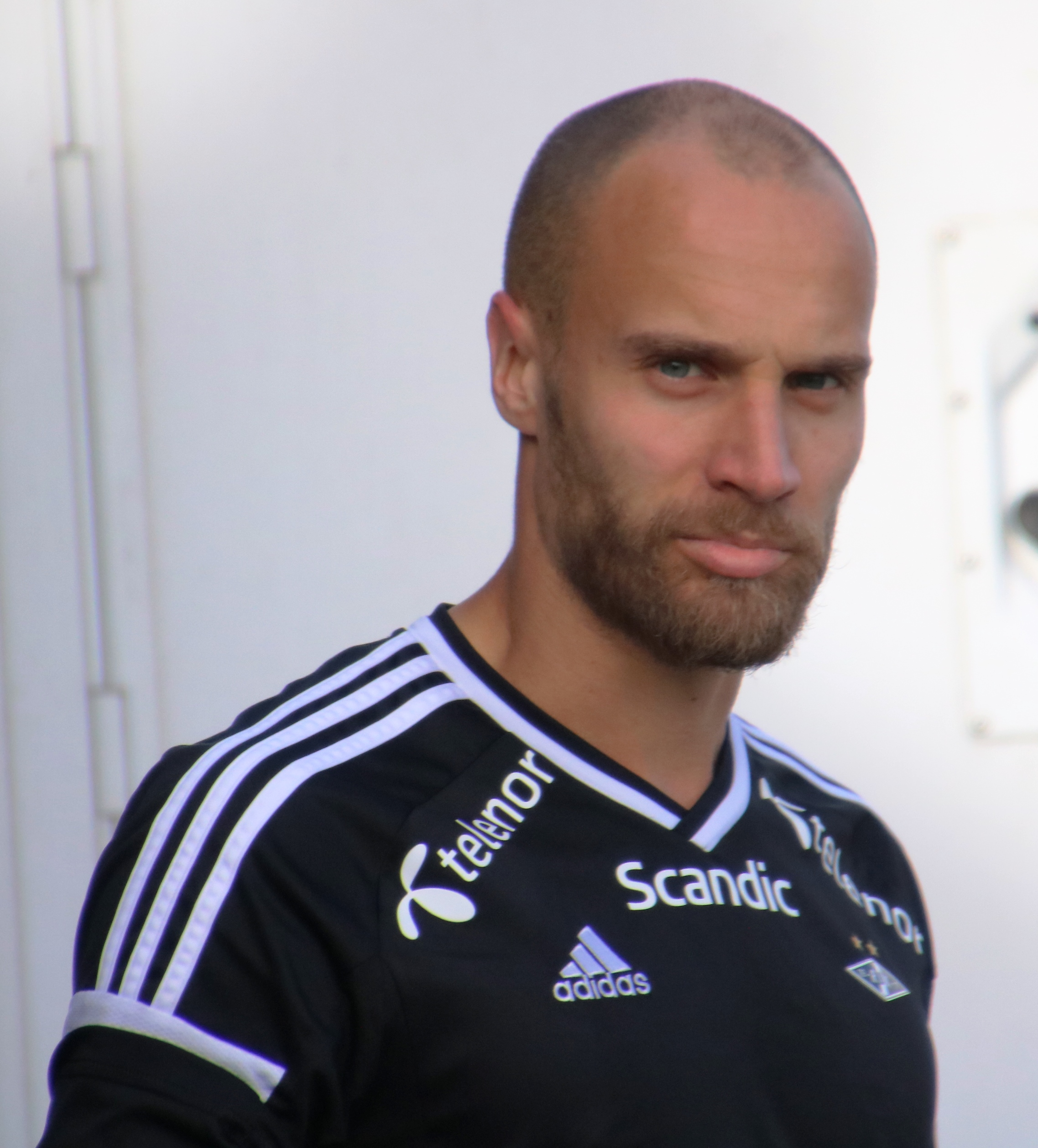
- Reginiussen in 2017

Personal information
- Full name: Tore Reginiussen
- Date of birth: 10 April 1986 (age 40)
- Place of birth: Alta, Norway
- Height: 1.85 m (6 ft 1 in)
- Position: Defender

Team information
- Current team: Alta
- Number: 10

Senior career*
Years	Team	Apps	(Gls)
2003–2005	Alta	53	(3)
2006–2009	Tromsø	91	(6)
2009–2011	Schalke 04	1	(0)
2010–2011	→ Lecce (loan)	0	(0)
2011	→ Tromsø (loan)	10	(1)
2011–2012	OB	23	(2)
2012–2020	Rosenborg	190	(15)
2021	FC St. Pauli	10	(0)
2021	Alta	3	(2)

International career^{‡}
2004	Norway U15	4	(0)
2005–2006	Norway U17	7	(2)
2006–2008	Norway U21	15	(0)
2008–2020	Norway	31	(4)
- * Club domestic league appearances and goals as of 24 August 2021 ‡ National team caps and goals as of 11 October 2020

Tore Reginiussen (born 10 April 1986) is a Norwegian former professional footballer. Reginiussen has previously played for the clubs Tromsø, Schalke 04, Lecce, OB, Rosenborg, FC St. Pauli and Alta and has been capped playing for Norway. Reginiussen played as a centre back, but could also play as a central midfielder.

== Club career ==
=== Early career in Norway ===
Born in Alta, Norway, Reginiussen started his career with local club Alta. He progressed through the youth ranks of Alta and turned professional in 2003. He made his Alta debut, coming on as a 68th-minute substitute for Roy Rasmussen, in a 7–1 loss against Sandefjord on 14 September 2003. Reginiussen made his first starts, starting the whole game, in a 4–1 win against Ørn Horten on 19 October 2003. Following Alta's relegation, he went on to make six appearances for the side at the end of the 2003 season.

In the 2004 season, Reginiussen became a first regular for the side, starting in a number of matches, and later helped the side get promoted to 1. Divisjon. In the 2005 season, Reginiussen continued to be a first regular for the side, starting in a number of matches, but the club was relegated once again. He played an important for the side when he helped Alta beat his future club, Tromsø, in the third round of the Norwegian Cup. At the end of the 2005 season, Reginiussen went on to make twenty–three appearances in all competitions.

=== Tromsø ===
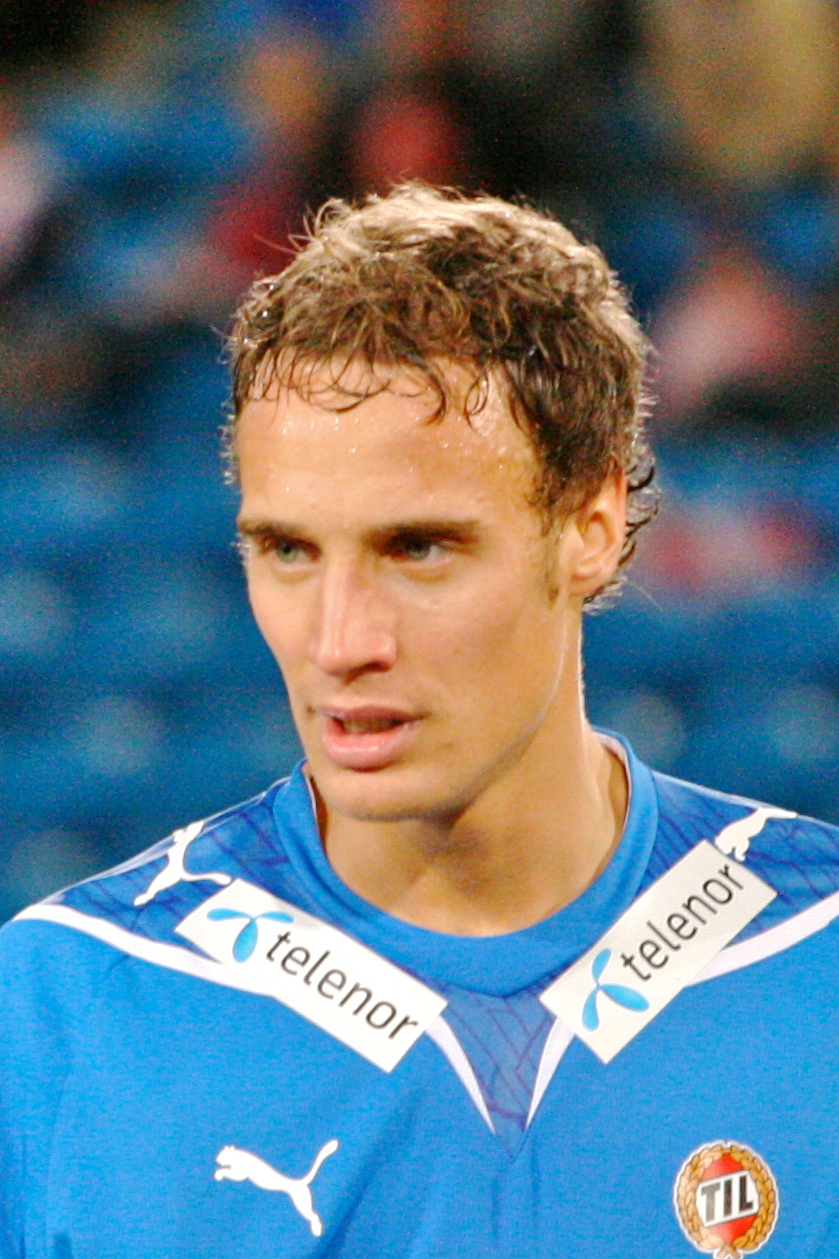
Reginiussen pictured during his time at Tromsø in 2009.

In late 2005, after considering offers from Brann and Bodø/Glimt, he signed a contract with Tromsø in January 2006.

Having missed the opening game of the season, due to an injury, Reginiussen made his Tromsø debut, starting the whole game, in a 1–0 against Stabæk on 17 April 2006. Since joining the club, he quickly became a first team regular for the side, playing in either the midfielder and defender positions. After serving a one match suspension, Reginiussen scored on his return, in a 3–1 win against Brann on 24 September 2006. At Alfheim, Reginiussen was an instant success, and after his first season with Tromsø, he was voted "Player of the Year" by the supporter club Isberget. Reginiussen went on to make twenty–five appearances and scoring once in all competitions.

In the 2007 season, Reginiussen continued to regain his first team place for the side. He then scored his first Tromsø goal of the season, in a 4–3 loss against FK Lyn on 28 May 2007. In June 2007, he extended his contract with Tromsø until the end of the 2009 season, ending interests from French clubs keen on signing him. Reginiussen then scored his second league of the season, in a 3–0 win against Lillestrøm on 16 September 2007. Despite missing two matches during the 2007 season, Reginiussen went on to make twenty–eight appearances and scoring two times in all competitions. Reflecting the season, he spoke about his development at the club in his second season.

Ahead of the 2008 season, Reginiussen was linked a move away from Tromsø, leading the club to declare that he's not for sale. At the start of the 2008 season, he continued to regain his first team place for the side, as well as, facing competitions in the defence and midfield positions. But ahead of the match against Rosenborg on 26 April 2008, Reginiussen suffered a meniscus in training, which he quickly recovered. He then started the match against Rosenborg and helped them keep a clean sheet by beating them 1–0. Reginiussen then kept three clean sheets in three matches between 28 July 2008 and 6 August 2008. Since the start of the 2008 season, Reginiussen appeared in every match until he suffered a fractured jaw after colliding with Sead Ramović and had to be substituted early, in a 0–0 draw against FK Bodø/Glimt on 11 September 2008. Following this, it was announced that he would be sidelined for the rest of the season. But Reginiussen returned to training soon after in mid–October. It wasn't until on 18 October 2008 when he made his return to the starting line-up, and helped the side draw 4–4 draw against Molde. Throughout the 2008 season, he continued to impress the club's defence and attack and helped them finish third place in the league. At the end of the 2008 season, where Reginiussen made twenty–seven appearances in all competitions, he was nominated for the league's defender of the year but lost out to Morten Skjønsberg. On 14 November 2008, it was revealed that Reginiussen would be traveling to England for a trial with Blackburn Rovers and impressed the side to earn a transfer move to England. However, the move to Blackburn broke down when Paul Ince, and a transfer to Fulham, with Brede Hangeland and Erik Nevland, was discussed. It came after when it was announced that he would leaving Tromsø at the end of the 2008 season.

However, Reginiussen stayed at Tromsø for the 2009 season despite not keen on signing a new contract. He continued to retain his first team place at the start of the season, playing in the defensive or midfield position. Reginiussen was sent–off in the 67th minute for a professional foul on Bernt Hulsker, in a 3–1 loss against IK Start on 26 April 2009. After the match, the club appeal against his suspension, citing the TV replays, but in the end, he served a two match suspension. It wasn't until on 16 May 2009 when Reginiussen returned to the starting line-up, playing the whole game, in a 0–0 draw against FK Bodø/Glimt. He also continued be a key figure in the club's defence over the season. During a 2–0 loss against Stabæk on 1 June 2009, he suffered a groin injury and had to be substituted in the 36th minute, resulting him being out for several weeks. It wasn't until on 24 June 2009 when Reginiussen made his return, coming on as the 56th-minute substitute, in a 1–0 loss against Viking. It wasn't until on 26 July 2009 when Reginiussen scored his first Tromsø goal, in a 2–1 win against Strømsgodset. This was followed up by scoring in a 2–2 draw against Lillestrøm. His third goal then came on 20 September 2009, scoring the only goal of the game, in a 1–0 against Molde. Reginiussen followed up with the next two matches by keeping a clean sheet. However, he suffered injuries that kept him out for the rest of the 2009 season. At the end of the 2009 season, he went on to make thirty–two appearances and scoring four times in all competitions.

=== Schalke 04 ===
On 21 December 2009, Reginiussen announced he was leaving Tromsø and signed a three-and-a-half-year contract with Schalke 04.

During his first season with Schalke, Reginiussen's efforts to secure a place on the team were severely hampered by injury. He made his Bundesliga debut against Hoffenheim on 30 January; he came on as a substitute, receiving 19 minutes of playing time on the right back. The following day, he was injured during a practice session, resulting in back pains that had him sidelined for several weeks. Once free of his injury, he spent the remainder of the season playing for the reserve team. During which, Regininussen kept three clean sheets in a row between 13 April 2010 and 24 April 2010. In May, Reginiussen admitted that, with Schalke's qualification for the Champions League, and the signing of Christoph Metzelder, yet another centre back, his chances of gaining first team appearances in the coming season were looking slim. He also confessed that Schalke willing, he might consider being loaned out to another club.

At the end of July, such a move was indeed agreed to, as Reginiussen and Schalke put pen to paper on a one-year loan deal with the newly promoted Serie A club Lecce. He appeared as an unused substitute in the opening game of the season, losing 4–0 against A.C. Milan. However, he failed to play regularly, due to a fatigue fracture. As a result, Reginiussen returned to Schalke 04 on 19 January 2011.

It was announced on 18 March 2011 that Reginussen was loaned out to Tromsø, returning to the club for the first time since 2009. He made his second Tromsø's debut, starting the whole game, and kept a clean sheet, in a 2–0 win against IK Start on 10 April 2011. In a follow–up match against Sogndal, Reginussen helped the side keep another clean sheet, in a 0–0 draw. Since re-joining the club, he quickly became a first team regular, playing in either the defence and midfield positions. After his transfer move to Odense will take effect on 1 July 2011, Reginussen then scored his first Tromsø for the first time since 2009, in a 3–3 draw against Stabæk, in his last appearance for the club. By the time he departed the club once again, Reginiussen made ten appearances and scoring once for the side.

=== Odense BK ===
On 13 June 2011, Reginiussen signed a contract with the Danish team Odense BK and got shirt number 8.

He made his Odense BK debut, starting the whole game, setting up a goal for Hans Henrik Andreasen, who scored twice, in a 2–0 win against FC Nordsjælland on 16 July 2011. Two weeks later on 27 July 2011, Reginiussen scored his first Odense BK goal, scoring from a header, in a 1–1 draw against Panathinaikos in the first leg of the UEFA Champions League third round. In the second leg, he helped the side beat Panathinaikos 4–3, winning 5–4 on aggregate to progress to the next round. However, Reginiussen suffered a muscle injury and had to be substituted in the first half during a 2–1 loss against Aalborg on 13 August 2011. It wasn't until on 23 August 2011 when he made his return to the starting line-up, as OB lost 3–0 against Villarreal, losing 3–1 on aggregate of the UEFA Champions League Play–Off Round and was eliminated from the tournament. Reginiussen scored his second goal for the club, in a 3–1 win against Wisła Kraków in the UEFA Europa League Group Stage. After missing one match, due to a finger injury, he scored on his return to the starting line-up, in a 3–1 loss against FC Midtjylland on 26 November 2011. Reginiussen later scored again on 25 March 2012, in a 4–2 loss against HB Køge. However, he suffered a leg during a match against FC Midtjylland on 14 April 2012, leading him to be sidelined for the rest of the season. Having established himself in the starting eleven at OB, Reginiussen went on to make thirty appearances and scoring three times in all competitions,

At the start of the 2012–13 season, Reginiussen saw his first team opportunities at OB limited in his second season, appearing as a late substitute in the first two league matches.

=== Rosenborg ===
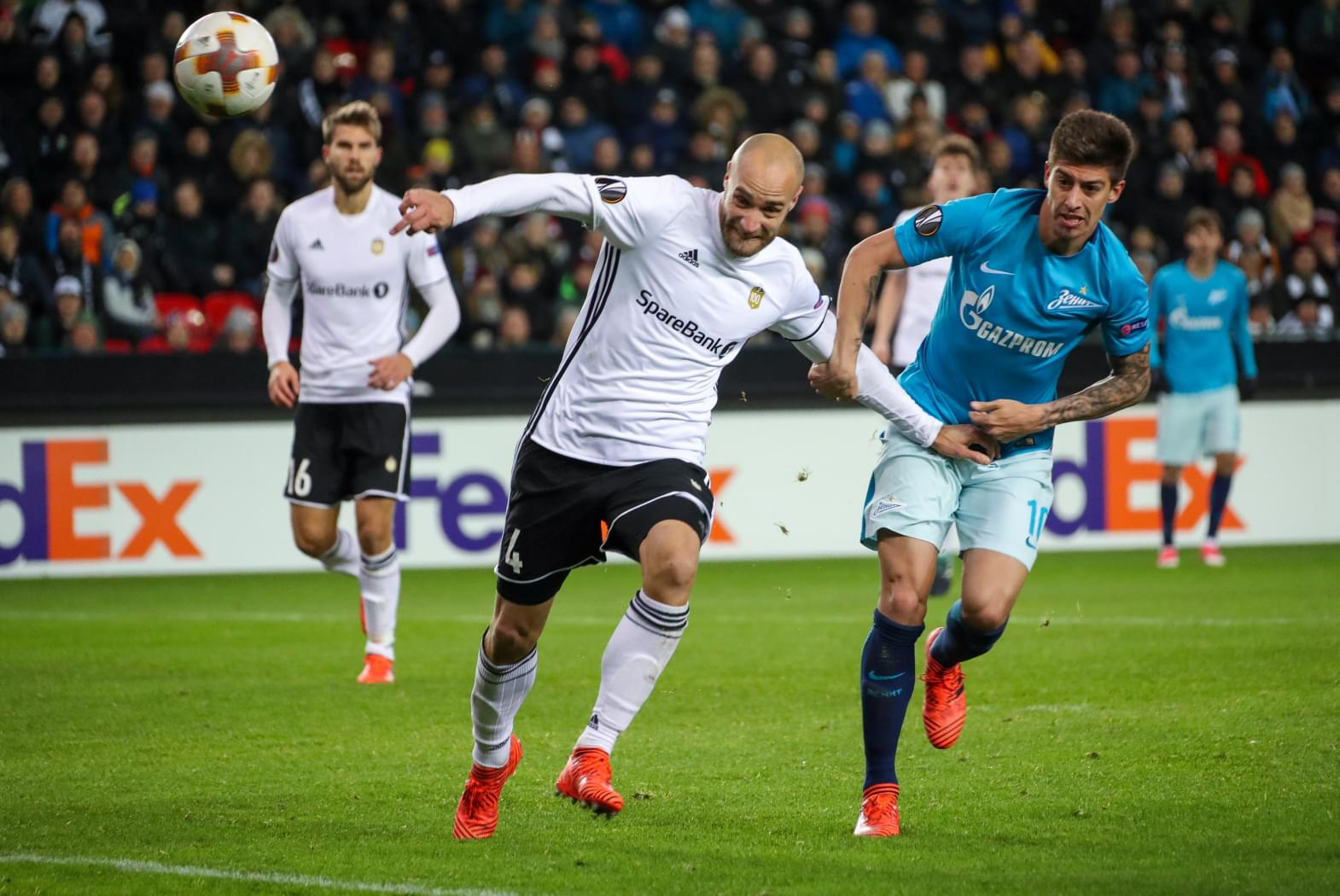
Reginiussen chasing a ball with Zenit Saint Petersburg's player Emiliano Rigoni in the UEFA Europa League match in November 2017.

On 5 August 2012, Reginiussen signed a three-and-a-half-year deal with Norwegian team Rosenborg.

Reginiussen made his Rosenborg debut, starting the whole game, in a 3–0 win against Sogndal IL on 12 August 2012. He then played in both legs of the UEFA Europa League Qualifying Round against Legia Warsaw, scoring in the second leg in a 2–1 victory, and ultimately progress through to the group stage following a 3–2 win on aggregate. Since joining the club, Reginiussen became a first team regular for the side, playing in the centre–back position and formed a partnership with Stefan Strandberg. Having helped the side keep three clean sheets throughout the 2012 season, he went on to make seventeen appearances and scoring once in all competitions.

Ahead of the 2013 season, Reginiussen was chosen by the new head coach Per Joar Hansen as Rosenborg's captain, replacing Mikael Dorsin. He started the season well as captain by helping the club keep a clean sheet in the first three league matches of the season. Reginiussen started the first seven matches until he was sent off in the 65th minute for a professional foul in a penalty box, in a 1–0 loss against Sandnes Ulf on 28 April 2013. Having served his suspension, Reginiussen returned to the starting line-up, in a 2–1 win against Tromsø on 8 May 2013. He scored his first goal of the season, scoring from a header, in a 2–1 win against Vålerenga on 25 May 2013. Reginiussen then followed up in the next three matches by keeping a clean sheet. He scored three goals throughout August, scoring against Sogndal IL, Strømsgodset and Sandnes Ulf. Reginiussen helped the side finish second place after Strømsgodset won their match in the last game of the season, with performance earned attention from the Norwegian media. In the Norwegian Football Cup Final against Molde, he scored the club's second goal of the game, as they lost 4–2. At the end of the 2013 season, Reginiussen went on to make thirty–seven appearances and scoring five times in all competitions.

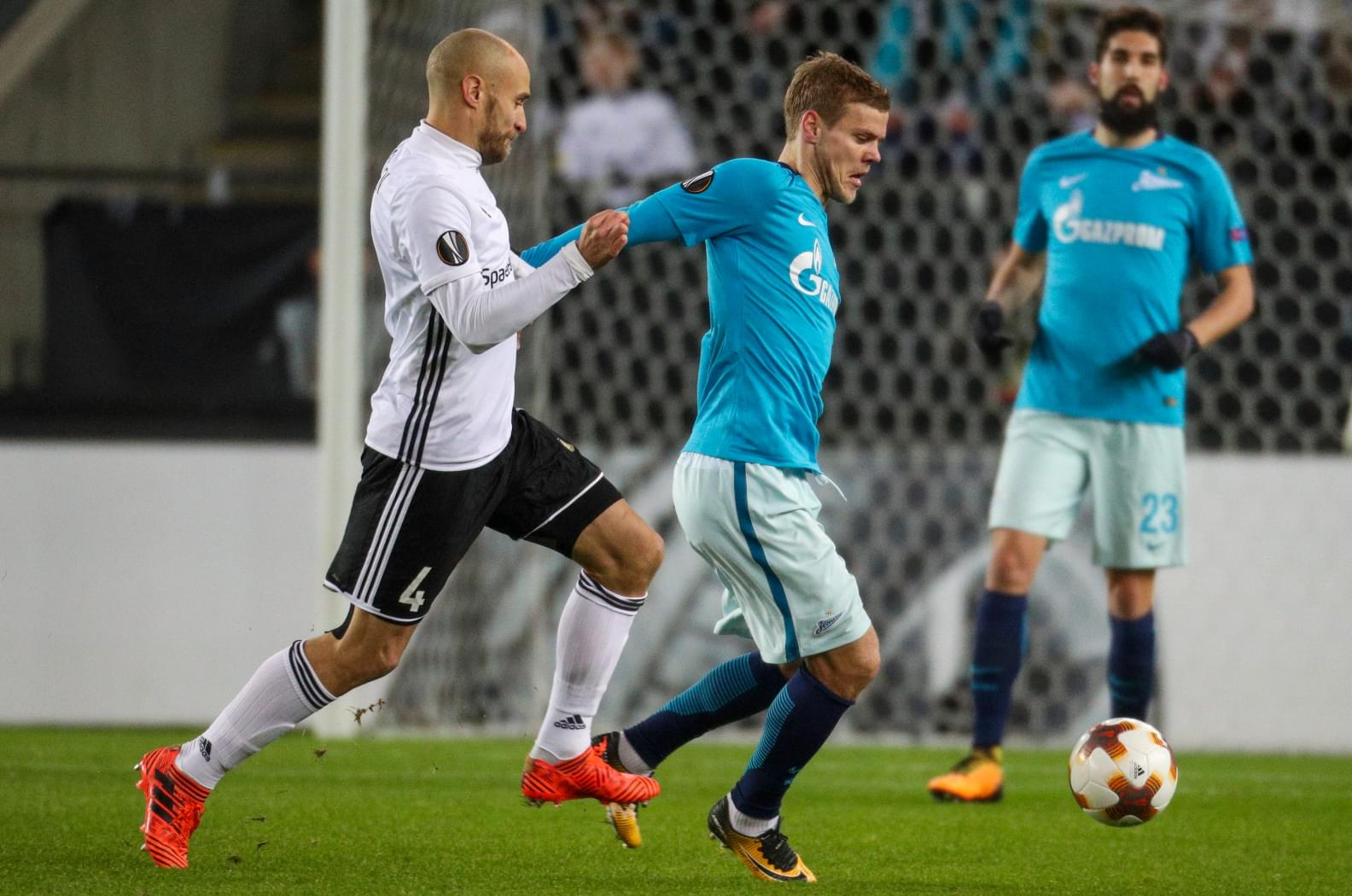
Reginiussen chasing a ball with Zenit Saint Petersburg's player Aleksandr Kokorin in the UEFA Europa League match in November 2017.

Ahead of the 2014 season, Reginiussen was one of the Rosenborg players willingly to take a pay cut in the wake of the club's budget cuts. At the start of the 2014 season, Reginiussen continued to retain his first team place, playing in the centre–back position and formed a partnership with Strandberg, as well as, his captaincy. He then scored his first goal of the season, in a 3–0 win against Orkla FK in the first round of the Norwegian Football Cup, followed up by scoring two goals in the next two matches against SK Brann and Sogndal IL. After missing one match, he returned to the starting line-up, helping the side keep a clean sheet, in a 2–0 win against Sandnes Ulf on 12 May 2014. Four days later on 16 May 2014, Reginiussen scored his fourth goal of the season, in a 2–1 loss against Stabæk. As captain, he acknowledged the club's recent performances in a number of matches in mid–May. His fifth goal of the season came on 13 July 2014, in a 2–2 draw against Vålerenga. Reginiussen helped the side win four UEFA Europa League Qualifying matches before being eliminated by Karabükspor through away goal. However towards the end of the 2014 season, Reginiussen found himself in a sidelined, which saw him suffered injuries and suspension. Despite this, he went on to make thirty–two appearances and scoring five times in all competitions. Shortly after, Reginiussen signed a four–year contract with the club, keeping him until 2018.

In the 2015 season, Reginiussen started the match in the opening game of the season against Aalesunds and helped them beat 5–0. However, during the match, he injured his Achilles and had to be substituted in the 65th minute, resulting a successful operation but was sidelined for six months. In September 2015, Reginiussen returned from injury, playing for the reserve side to regain his fitness. It wasn't until on 4 October 2015 against IK Start when he came on as a 78th-minute substitute, in a 4–0 win Reginuissen was given his first start since April 2015, captain the side to help them draw 3–3 draw against Strømsgodset on 25 October 2015. Reginiussen came on as a 72nd-minute substitute against Haugesund on 1 November 2015 and helped the side win 4–3, resulting in the club becoming Champions for the first time since 2010 In the Norwegian Football Cup Final against Sarpsborg 08, he came on as a late substitute for Mikael Dorsin, in a 2–0 win to win the tournament. At the end of the 2015 season, Reginiussen went on to make five appearances for the side.

Ahead of the 2016 season, Reginiussen was replaced as a captain by Mike Jensen, having convinced Manager Kåre Ingebrigtsen to do so. Reginiussen started the season when he helped the side keep four clean sheets between 19 March 2016 and 16 April 2016; during which, he scored in a 1–0 win against Aalesunds. Since the start of the 2016 season, Reginiussen regained his first team place, playing in the centre–back position and formed a partnership with Hólmar Örn Eyjólfsson. However, during a 2–0 win against IK Start on 16 May 2016, he suffered a thigh injury, resulting in his substitution in the 59th minute and was sidelined for two months. After being sidelined for two months, Reginiussen made his return to the starting line-up starting the whole game, in a 0–0 draw against Bodø/Glimt on 2 July 2016. Following this, he found himself rotated with Johan Bjørdal, Jørgen Skjelvik and Eyjólfsson in the starting line-up, which saw him placed on the substitute bench. Amid to this, he played both legs of the UEFA Europa League Qualifying Round against Austria Wien; scoring in the first leg, but was subsequently eliminated after losing 4–2 on aggregate. Reginiussen came on as a 66th-minute substitute against Molde on 24 September 2016, and helped them win 4–0 to become Champions for the second time in a row. Following this, he started four of the last five league matches of the season. In a match against Sarpsborg 08 on 15 October 2016, he scored his second goal of the season, in a 2–2 draw. In the Norwegian Football Cup Final against Kongsvinger, he scored the club's second goal of the game, in a 4–0 win to the tournament for the second in a row. At the end of the 2016 season, Reginiussen went on to make twenty–eight appearances and scoring three times in all competitions.

At the start of the 2017 season, Reginiussen came on as 88th-minute substitute against SK Brann in the first ever the inaugural Mesterfinalen and scored a goal in the stoppage to help them win 2–0 win. He continued to help the club to a winning start, as well as, keeping four clean sheets in the first five league matches of the season. He then scored his second goal of the season, in a 9–1 win against Tynset in the second round of the Norwegian Cup on 24 May 2017. Two months later on 12 July 2017, Reginiussen scored his third goal of the season, in a 1–1 draw against Dundalk in the first leg of the UEFA Champions League Second Round. He helped the side beat 2–1 after the game went extra time, winning 3–2 on aggregate to go through to the next round. Since the start of the 2017 season, Reginiussen continued to be in the first team regular, playing in the centre–back position, and formed a partnership with Skjelvik and Björdal; earning praises from the Norwegian media for his performance. Later in the 2017 season, Reginiussen appeared as an unused substitute against Aalesunds on 4 November 2017, as the club lost 2–1, but nevertheless become Champions for the third time in a row. Following this, he won the league's Player of the Year. It was announced on 23 December 2017 that Reginiussen signed a contract, keeping him until 2019. Despite being sidelined on three occasions during the 2017 season, Reginiussen went on to make thirty–six appearances and scoring three times in all competitions.

At the start of the 2018 season, Reginiussen came on as a second-half substitute, and helped them beat Lillestrøm 1–0 to win Mesterfinalen for the second time in a row. He then helped the side keep four clean sheets between 8 April 2018 and 29 April 2018; during which, he scored in a 2–0 win against IK Start. Since the start of the 2018 season, Reginiussen continued to regain his first team place, playing in the centre–back position, forming a partnership with Even Hovland. A month later on 30 May 2018, he scored the winning penalty for Rosenborg, as they beat Odds 7–2 in the shootout after the game went to extra time, with a 2–2 scoreline. Two months later on 11 June 2018, he scored his second goal of the season, in a 2–1 loss against Tromsø. This was followed by helping the club keep two clean sheets in the next two matches against Vålerenga and Sandefjord. Reginiussen helped the side qualify for the UEFA Europa League Group Stage after beating KF Shkëndija 5–1 on aggregate; in which he scored in the second leg. In a match against IK Start on 11 November 2018, Reginiussen started the match and helped them to keep a clean sheet, as they won 1–0, a victory that saw the club become Champions for the fourth time in a row. In a follow–up match against Bodø/Glimt, he set up a goal for Yann-Erik de Lanlay, as they drew 1–1. A month later on 2 December 2018, Reginiussen started the match, as he helped the side beat Strømsgodset win 4–1 win to win the tournament, his third time of his career. Reginiussen scored his fourth goal of the season, in a 1–1 draw against RB Leipzig on 13 December 2018. At the end of the 2018 season, he went on to make forty–seven appearances and scoring four times in all competitions.

In the 2019 season, Reginiussen continued to regain his first team place, playing in the centre–back position and forming a partnership with Hovland. He scored his first goal of the season, in a 3–1 loss against Stabæk on 14 April 2019. His second goal then came on 19 May 2019, in a 3–2 win against Mjøndalen IF. A month later, he captained the side for the first time since 2016, as Rosenborg lost 1–0 against Tromsø. Three days later, Reguiniussen scored an equalising goal in a 1–1 draw against Aalesund in the Round of 16 of the Norwegian Cup; which the club lost on penalty shoot–out. It was announced on 1 August 2019 that Reginiussen signed a contract with Rosenborg, keeping him until 2020. He then helped the club beat Linfield, BATE and Maribor to progress through on three UEFA Champions League rounds. However, Rosenborg was eliminated in the UEFA Champions League qualifying round after losing 3–1 on aggregate. He scored his third goal of the season, in a 3–2 win against Bodø/Glimt on 10 October 2019. However, throughout 2019 season, the club were unsuccessful to defending their league title after surrendering the title to Molde. Despite suffering from injuries later in the 2019 season, Reginiussen went on to make thirty–eight appearances and scoring four times in all competitions.

However, the start of the 2020 season was pushed back to June due to the pandemic. Reginiussen were among Rosenborg players to agreeing to take a pay cut as a result of the pandemic. Following the departure of Jensen, he resumed his role as the club's captain. Reginiussen captained his first match in almost a year, starting the whole game and helping Rosenborg keep a clean sheet, in a 0–0 draw against Kristiansund in the opening game of the season. Since the start of the 2020 season, he continued to establish himself in centre–back position, forming a partnership with Hovland and Eyjólfsson. Reginiussen helped the club keep three clean sheets in three matches between 5 July 2020 and 16 July 2020. A month later on 27 August 2020, he scored his first goal of the season, scoring from a header, in a 4–2 win against Breiðablik to advance to the next round of the UEFA Europa League. Reginiussen then scored his second goal of the season, once again scoring from a header, in a 3–1 win against Molde on 13 December 2020, in what turned out to be his last appearances for Rosenborg. Despite missing a total of four matches during the 2020 season, he went on to make twenty–nine appearances and scoring two times in all competitions.

At the end of the 2020 season, it was announced on 18 December 2020 that Reginiussen and Rosenborg parted ways after eight years at Rosenborg. Reginiussen previously stated in an interview earlier this year that this would be his last season with the club. Following his release by Rosenborg, he was linked with a move to Ranheim and has ruled out from retiring.

=== FC St. Pauli ===
On 25 January 2021, Reginiussen returned to Germany, where he signed with 2. Bundesliga team, FC St. Pauli until the end of the 2020–21 season, with the option of an extension.

Reginiussen made his debut for the club, coming on an 84th-minute substitute, in a 2–1 win against SV Sandhausen on 5 February 2021. He then made his first start for FC St. Pauli against Karlsruher SC on 6 March 2021 and helped the club keep a clean sheet, in a 0–0 draw. On 10 May 2021, Reginiussen announced he would retire from football after the season.

== International career ==
=== Youth ===
Reginiussen represented Norway levels from U15 to U19 sides.

On 28 February 2006, he made his debut for Norway U-21. It wasn't until on 16 August 2006 when Reginiussen scored his first goal for the national team, in a 3–0 win against Estonia U21. Reginiussen played in his career 15 caps for the Norway U-21. During his time playing for the Norway U-21, at one point, he was captain for the U-21 side.

=== Senior ===
His performance for Norway U-21 led the Norwegian media calls for Manager Åge Hareide to call up Reguiniussen to the national team. In May 2008, Hareide called up Reguiniussen to the national team for the first time in his career, whilst also being called up by the U-21 side at the same time. Reginiussen made his debut for Norway on 28 May 2008 against Uruguay in a friendly match, starting the match but was fault for conceding Uruguay's second goal of the game, as they drew 2–2. He then scored his first international goal for Norway, in a 1–1 draw against Republic of Ireland on 20 August 2008. Reginiussen started two more matches for Norway by the end of 2008. During a 1–0 win against South Africa on 10 October 2009, he suffered a concussion after being contacted from the opposition player's elbow and was substituted in the 59th minute as a result.

After spending almost two years away from the national team, Norway called Reginiussen for the first time in November 2011. In his tenth international match, he won the match as he scored the only goal of the match, scoring from a free kick against Thailand in Bangkok on 18 January 2012. Two years later, Reginiussen was the national team captain in his last two matches of January, both playing in Abu Dhabi against Moldova and Poland. He spent the rest of the 2014, appearing as an unused substitute.

After a three years absence, Reginiussen was called up to the Norway national team, appearing as an unused substitute against Northern Ireland on 26 March 2017. Three months later on 10 June 2017, he made his first appearance for Norway in almost three years, starting a match before being substituted in the 33rd minute, in a 1–1 draw against Czech Republic. It wasn't until on 23 March 2018 when Reginiussen scored his first goal for the national team since 2012, in a 4–1 win against Australia. The following year on 15 November 2019, he scored again, in a 4–0 against Faroe Islands. Reginiussen made two more appearances the following year, including a UEFA Euro 2020 qualifying play-offs’ loss against Serbia on 8 October 2020. On 2 November 2020, he chose to retire from international football to let younger player get the chance. By the time Reginussen announced his retirement from international football, he won twenty–nine caps and scored four times for Norway.

== Personal life ==
Reginiussen has two brothers, Mads, who joined Tromsø at the start of the 2009 season, and Christian, who currently plays for Alta. Five years later on 4 June 2014, both Tore and Mads played against each other in the third round of the Norwegian Cup, resulting a penalty shootout for Mads’ Ranheim after the game went extra time.

He has a father named Torfinn Reginiussen. Reginiussen has two sons, (born in January 2013 and 2016) with Lene Nilsen. The couple were married in November 2014.

In September 2015, Reginiussen made a statement to Norwegian media and public to call for help with the Syrian refugees. Reginiussen revealed in a 2017 interview that he's studying to be a physician therapist once his playing days are over. In March 2018, he was included in the World Soccer's 500 Most Important Players. Together with then teammate Pål André Helland, they spoke out about Homosexuality in football in July 2020.

== Career statistics ==
=== Club ===
As of match played 18 August 2021

Appearances and goals by club, season and competition
Club	Season	League			National Cup		Continental		Other		Total	
Club	Season	Division	Apps	Goals	Apps	Goals	Apps	Goals	Apps	Goals	Apps	Goals
Tromsø	2006	Tippeligaen	22	1	3	0	–		–		25	1
Tromsø	2007	Tippeligaen	24	2	4	0	–		–		28	2
Tromsø	2008	Tippeligaen	23	0	4	0	–		–		27	0
Tromsø	2009	Tippeligaen	22	3	3	1	6	0	–		32	4
Tromsø	Total		91	6	14	1	6	0	0	0	111	7
Schalke 04	2009–10	Bundesliga	1	0	0	0	–		–		1	0
Schalke 04	Total		1	0	0	0	–		–		1	0
Lecce (loan)	2010–11	Serie A	0	0	0	0	–		–		0	0
Lecce (loan)	Total		0	0	0	0	–		–		0	0
Tromsø (loan)	2011	Tippeligaen	10	1	4	2	–		–		14	3
Tromsø (loan)	Total		10	1	4	2	–		–		14	3
OB	2011–12	Superliga	21	2	0	0	9	1	–		30	3
OB	2012–13	Superliga	2	0	0	0	–		–		2	0
OB	Total		23	2	0	0	9	1	0	0	32	3
Rosenborg	2012	Tippeligaen	11	0	0	0	7	1	–		17	1
Rosenborg	2013	Tippeligaen	28	4	6	1	3	0	–		37	5
Rosenborg	2014	Tippeligaen	24	4	2	1	6	0	–		32	5
Rosenborg	2015	Tippeligaen	4	0	1	0	1	0	–		6	0
Rosenborg	2016	Tippeligaen	19	2	3	1	6	1	–		28	3
Rosenborg	2017	Eliteserien	25	0	1	1	9	1	1	1	36	3
Rosenborg	2018	Eliteserien	29	2	5	0	12	2	1	0	47	4
Rosenborg	2019	Eliteserien	24	3	2	1	12	0	–		38	4
Rosenborg	2020	Eliteserien	26	1	0	0	3	1	–		29	2
Rosenborg	Total		190	16	20	5	59	6	2	1	271	28
FC St. Pauli	2020–21	2. Bundesliga	10	0	0	0	–		–		10	0
FC St. Pauli	Total		10	0	0	0	–		–		10	0
Alta	2021	PostNord-ligaen	2	2	1	0	–		–		3	2
Alta	Total		2	2	1	0	–		–		3	2
Career total			327	27	39	8	74	7	2	1	442	43

=== International ===
As of match played on 8 October 2020

Appearances and goals by national team and year
National team	Year	Apps	Goals
Norway	2008	5	1
Norway	2009	3	0
Norway	2010	0	0
Norway	2011	0	0
Norway	2012	5	1
Norway	2013	6	0
Norway	2014	2	0
Norway	2015	0	0
Norway	2016	0	0
Norway	2017	3	0
Norway	2018	2	1
Norway	2019	3	1
Norway	2020	2	0
Total		31	4

Scores and results list Norway's goal tally first, score column indicates score after each Reginiussen goal.

List of international goals scored by Tore Reginiussen
No.	Date	Venue	Opponent	Score	Result	Competition
1	20 August 2008	Ullevaal Stadion, Oslo	Republic of Ireland	1–1	1–1	Friendly
2	18 January 2012	Rajamangala Stadium, Bangkok	Thailand	1–0	1–0	Friendly
3	23 March 2018	Ullevaal Stadion, Oslo	Australia	2–1	4–1	Friendly
4	15 November 2019	Ullevaal Stadion, Oslo	Faroe Islands	1–0	4–0	UEFA Euro 2020 qualification

== Honours ==
=== Club ===
Rosenborg

- Tippeligaen/Eliteserien (4): 2015, 2016, 2017, 2018
- Norwegian Cup (3): 2015, 2016, 2018
- Mesterfinalen (2): 2017, 2018

=== Individual ===
- Eliteserien Player of the Year: 2017
