= Mike Jensen =

Danish footballer (born 1988)

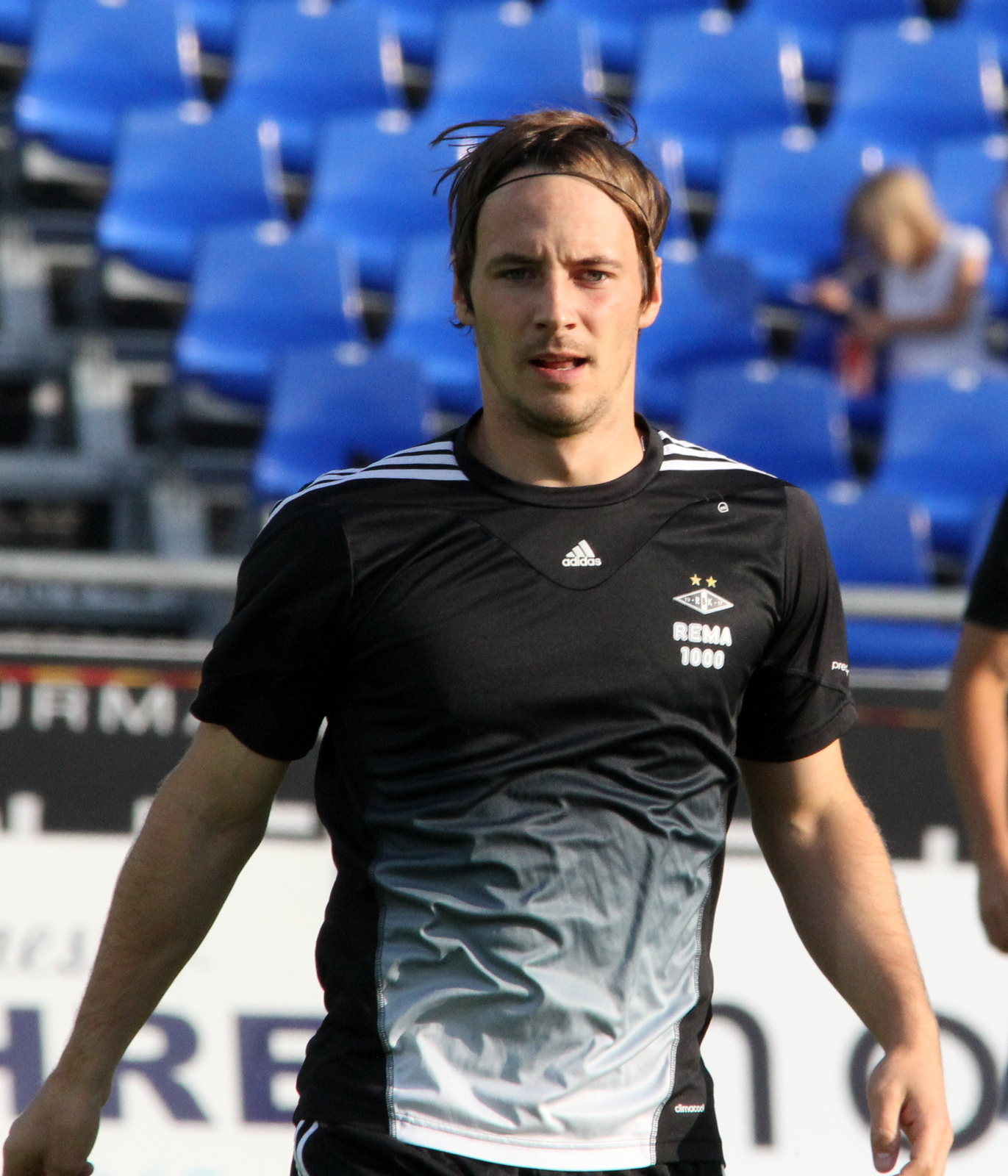
- Jensen in 2013

Personal information
- Full name: Mike Lindemann Jensen
- Date of birth: 19 February 1988 (age 38)
- Place of birth: Herlev, Denmark
- Height: 1.77 m (5 ft 10 in)
- Position: Midfielder

Team information
- Current team: HB Køge
- Number: 7

Youth career
- 1993–2001: BK Rødovre
- 2001–2006: Brøndby

Senior career*
Years	Team	Apps	(Gls)
2006–2013	Brøndby	133	(12)
2008–2009	→ Malmö FF (loan)	11	(0)
2013–2020	Rosenborg	197	(36)
2020	APOEL	17	(1)
2021–	HB Køge	152	(17)

International career
2002–2004	Denmark U16	6	(0)
2003–2005	Denmark U17	27	(4)
2005–2006	Denmark U18	4	(0)
2005–2007	Denmark U19	15	(3)
2008	Denmark U20	4	(2)
2008–2011	Denmark U21	27	(3)
2010–2018	Denmark	7	(0)
- * Club domestic league appearances and goals as of 2 June 2026

Mike Lindemann Jensen (Danish pronunciation: [ˈmɑjk ˈjensn̩]; born 19 February 1988) is a Danish professional footballer who plays as a midfielder for and captains Danish 1st Division club HB Køge. He has also been capped by Denmark.

Jensen joined the Brøndby youth academy at age 13 and made his professional debut for the club in the 2006–07 season as a promising talent. After a loan to Malmö FF, he grew into a key figure on the Brøndby team, making well above 100 appearances for the club. In February 2013, Jensen left for Norway to play for top-tier club Rosenborg. There, he became team captain and was part of the squad's winning four league titles and three Norwegian Cups.

Jensen made his senior international debut for Denmark in August 2010.

== Club career ==
=== Brøndby ===
The son of former Brøndby player Henrik Jensen, Mike Jensen moved to the Brøndby youth academy at age 13 from BK Rødovre. In 2006, he was promoted to the first team. He made his professional debut in the Danish Superliga on 13 August 2006 in a 1–1 draw against Randers, where he came on for Martin Ericsson in the 85th minute. On 28 September 2006, he made his European debut in the second leg of the first qualifying round of the UEFA Cup against Eintracht Frankfurt (2–2); he came on in the 86th minute for Thomas Rasmussen. In the league, he made 11 appearances during the 2006–07 season, as he won the 2006 Danish U19 Player of the Year award. He scored his first senior goal in the 3–1 win over Silkeborg. In the following season, he made 13 appearances.

In July 2008, Jensen moved on loan to Allsvenskan club Malmö FF on a six-month deal and made 10 appearances. After the loan deal ended, he returned to Brøndby and found himself on the bench again, but became a regular during the 2009–10 season. With Brøndby, he failed to qualify for the group stage of the 2010–11 UEFA Europa League with the team being knocked out by Portuguese club Sporting CP in the play-off round.

=== Rosenborg ===
After Brøndby and Jensen could not agree on a contract extension in early 2013, he moved to Norwegian club Rosenborg BK in February 2013. On 17 March 2013, he played his first game for the Trondheim club in the away match against Odd on the first matchday and scored his first goal for his club in the 71st minute, which was also the 1–0 winner. With Rosenborg, Jensen regularly qualified for the Europa League and the Champions League, without advancing from the group stages.

In October 2015, Jensen won the 2015 Tippeligaen with Rosenborg. One month later, in November, Rosenborg secured the Norwegian double, when Jensen scored the final goal against Sarpsborg 08 in the Norwegian Football Cup final of 2015. Rosenborg won the match 2–0. He would also go on the win the 2016, 2017 and 2018 editions of the highest Norwegian league. Jensen was appointed team captain in January 2016, and he signed a five-year contract extension the following month.

Jensen made 285 total appearances for Rosenborg in which he scored 52 goals during his seven years at the club.

=== APOEL ===
On 11 January 2020, Jensen signed a contract with Cypriot club APOEL to 2021. On 22 December 2020, Jensen and APOEL agreed to terminate the contract, making Jensen a free agent.

=== HB Køge ===
On 1 February 2021, Jensen signed a three-and-a-half-year contract with second-tier Danish 1st Division club HB Køge on a free transfer. He made his debut on 13 February in a 1–1 league draw against Hobro IK, playing the full 90 minutes. The following week, Jensen scored his first goal for Køge in a 3–1 away win over Skive IK.

== International career ==
In May 2018 he was named in the Denmark national team’s preliminary 35-man squad for the 2018 World Cup in Russia but did not make the final 23.

== Career statistics ==
=== Club ===
As of match played 22 April 2026

Appearances and goals by club, season and competition
Club	Season	League			National cup (Note: Includes Danish Cup, Svenska Cupen, Norwegian Cup, Cypriot Cup)		Continental		Total	
Club	Season	Division	Apps	Goals	Apps	Goals	Apps	Goals	Apps	Goals
Brøndby	2005–06	Danish Superliga	2	0	0	0	–		2	0
Brøndby	2006–07	Danish Superliga	13	1	0	0	2	1	15	2
Brøndby	2007–08	Danish Superliga	13	0	0	0	–		13	0
Brøndby	2008–09	Danish Superliga	6	0	0	0	–		6	0
Brøndby	2009–10	Danish Superliga	30	2	0	0	6 (Note: Appearances in UEFA Europa League)	0	36	2
Brøndby	2010–11	Danish Superliga	32	5	0	0	5	1	37	6
Brøndby	2011–12	Danish Superliga	18	2	0	0	1	0	19	2
Brøndby	2012–13	Danish Superliga	19	2	2	0	–		21	2
Brøndby	Total		133	12	2	0	14	2	149	14
Malmö (loan)	2008	Allsvenskan	11	0	0	0	–		11	0
Rosenborg	2013	Tippeligaen	27	4	4	2	4	0	35	6
Rosenborg	2014	Tippeligaen	29	9	1	0	6	4	36	13
Rosenborg	2015	Tippeligaen	29	3	5	2	13	2	47	7
Rosenborg	2016	Tippeligaen	28	8	4	0	6 (Note: Four appearances in UEFA Champions League, two in UEFA Europa League)	0	38	8
Rosenborg	2017	Eliteserien	29	1	4	1	11 (Note: Four appearances in UEFA Champions League, seven in UEFA Europa League)	0	44	2
Rosenborg	2018	Eliteserien	28	6	4	1	14 (Note: Four appearances in UEFA Champions League, ten appearances and one goal in UEFA Europa League)	1	46	8
Rosenborg	2019	Eliteserien	27	5	3	1	13 (Note: Seven appearances and two goals in UEFA Champions League, six in UEFA Europa League)	2	43	8
Rosenborg	Total		197	36	21	7	67	9	285	52
APOEL	2019–20	Cypriot First Division	7	1	1	0	2	0	10	1
APOEL	2020–21	Cypriot First Division	10	0	0	0	2	0	12	0
APOEL	Total		17	1	1	0	4	0	22	1
Køge	2020–21	Danish 1st Division	13	1	0	0	–		13	1
Køge	2021–22	Danish 1st Division	28	3	1	0	–		29	3
Køge	2022–23	Danish 1st Division	31	2	0	0	–		31	2
Køge	2023–24	Danish 1st Division	24	2	1	0	–		25	2
Køge	2024–25	Danish 1st Division	27	4	2	0	–		29	4
Køge	2025–26	Danish 1st Division	24	4	1	0	–		25	4
Køge	Total		147	16	5	0	–		152	16
Career total			505	66	29	7	85	11	619	84

== Honours ==
Brøndby

- Danish Cup: 2007–08
- Royal League: 2006–07

Rosenborg

- Eliteserien: 2015, 2016, 2017, 2018
- Norwegian Football Cup: 2015, 2016, 2018
- Mesterfinalen: 2017, 2018

Individual

- Eliteserien Player of the Year: 2016
- Eliteserien Midfielder of the Year: 2016
- Eliteserien Top assist provider: 2015
