= Alexander Lund Hansen =

Norwegian football player (born 1982)

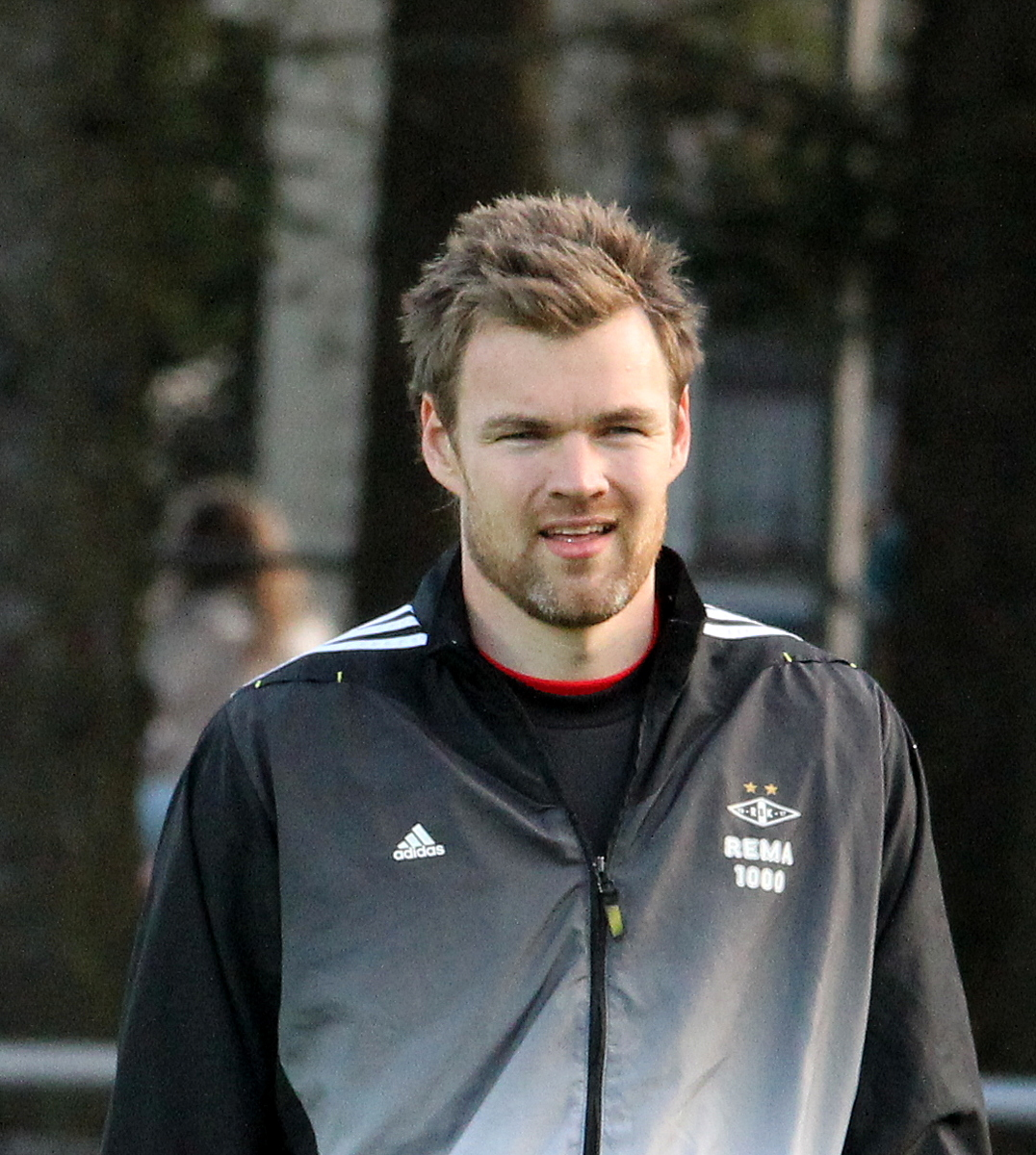

Personal information
- Full name: Alexander Lund Hansen
- Date of birth: 6 October 1982 (age 44)
- Place of birth: Åfjord Municipality, Norway
- Height: 1.97 m (6 ft 5 1/2 in)
- Position: Goalkeeper

Youth career
- Åfjord
- Nardo

Senior career*
Years	Team	Apps	(Gls)
2001–2010	Rosenborg	6	(0)
2004–2005	→ Fredrikstad (loan)	19	(0)
2010	OB	6	(0)
2011–2012	IK Start	20	(0)
2012–2016	Rosenborg	34	(0)
Total		85	(0)
- * Club domestic league appearances and goals as of 5 November 2016

Alexander Lund Hansen (born 6 October 1982) is a Norwegian former footballer.

== Career ==
He came to Rosenborg from local team Nardo in 2001. In parts of 2004 and 2005 he was on loan to Fredrikstad, where he played 19 matches. He played in six matches for Rosenborg in the Royal League in late 2006, where Rosenborg only got one point. He made his league debut for Rosenborg against Viking in the 1–0 win 23 July 2008.

On 13 November 2009, he signed a contract with Danish Odense, and joined the squad on 1 January 2010.

On 26 November 2010 he signed with IK Start, and joined the club on a free transfer on 1 January 2011. He returned to Rosenborg in August 2012.

After struggling to come back after receiving a concussion for the fifth time in not that many years, Lund Hansen was forced to retire at the end of the 2016 season. However, he will stay at Rosenborg, starting as a goalkeeping coach for the Rosenborg academy.

== Career statistics ==
As of 24 February 2016

Club	Season	Division	League		Cup		Europe		Total	
Club	Season	Division	Apps	Goals	Apps	Goals	Apps	Goals	Apps	Goals
2004	Fredrikstad	Tippeligaen	12	0	1	0	0	0	13	0
2005	Fredrikstad	Tippeligaen	7	0	0	0	0	0	7	0
2006	Rosenborg	Tippeligaen	0	0	0	0	0	0	0	0
2007	Rosenborg	Tippeligaen	0	0	1	0	0	0	1	0
2008	Rosenborg	Tippeligaen	3	0	2	0	2	0	7	0
2009	Rosenborg	Tippeligaen	3	0	1	0	0	0	4	0
2009–10	OB	Superliga	3	0	0	0	0	0	3	0
2010–11	OB	Superliga	3	0	0	0	1	0	4	0
2011	Start	Tippeligaen	4	0	2	0	0	0	6	0
2012	Start	Adeccoligaen	16	0	1	0	0	0	17	0
2012	Rosenborg	Tippeligaen	3	0	0	0	3	0	6	0
2013	Rosenborg	Tippeligaen	11	0	1	0	2	0	14	0
2014	Rosenborg	Tippeligaen	17	0	0	0	5	0	22	0
2015	Rosenborg	Tippeligaen	3	0	2	0	2	0	7	0
2016	Rosenborg	Tippeligaen	0	0	0	0	0	0	0	0
Career Total			85	0	11	0	15	0	111	0

== Honours ==
=== Club ===
Rosenborg

- Norwegian Premier League Championship: 2006, 2009, 2015
- Norwegian Football Cup: 2015

== Private ==
He is married to the handball world Champion and Olympic champion Gøril Snorroeggen.
