= 2012 Rosenborg BK season =

Rosenborg
2012 season
- Chairman: Ivar Koteng
- Manager: Jan Jönsson
- Stadium: Lerkendal Stadion
- Tippeligaen: 3rd
- Norwegian Cup: Fourth Round vs Molde
- Europa League: Group Stage
- Top goalscorer: League: Rade Prica (11); All: Bořek Dočkal (23)
- Highest home attendance: 20,572 vs Hønefoss; 16 May 2012
- Lowest home attendance: 1,000 vs Kvik Halden; 20 June 2012
- Average home league attendance: 13,394 ▼7.7% (in Tippeligaen); 11,156 (in all competitions)
Home colours	Away colours

The 2012 season was Rosenborg's 22nd consecutive year in Tippeligaen, and their 45th season in the topflight of Norwegian football. It was their second and final season with Jan Jönsson as manager. They participated in the Tippeligaen, finishing 3rd. They also took part in the 2012 Norwegian Football Cup, getting eliminated by Molde at the Fourth-Round stage and the 2012–13 UEFA Europa League, which they entered at the First qualifying round stage and were eliminated at the group stage.

== Squad ==
Note: Flags indicate national team as defined under FIFA eligibility rules; some limited exceptions apply. Players may hold more than one non-FIFA nationality.

No.	Pos.	Nation	Player
1	GK	SWE	Daniel Örlund
2	DF	CRC	Cristian Gamboa (on loan from Copenhagen)
3	DF	SWE	Mikael Dorsin
4	DF	NOR	Tore Reginiussen (captain)
5	DF	NOR	Per Verner Rønning
7	MF	GHA	Mohammed-Awal Issah
8	MF	CZE	Bořek Dočkal
9	FW	SWE	Rade Prica
10	MF	NGR	John Chibuike
11	FW	NOR	Steffen Iversen
12	GK	NOR	Alexander Lund Hansen

No.	Pos.	Nation	Player
13	MF	ESA	Jaime Alas
14	DF	NOR	Jon Inge Høiland
17	FW	NOR	Tarik Elyounoussi
18	MF	NOR	Daniel Berntsen
20	MF	NOR	Ole Kristian Selnæs
21	MF	NOR	Fredrik Midtsjø
22	MF	NOR	Jonas Svensson
24	DF	NOR	Stefan Strandberg
26	GK	NOR	Erik Bråthen
28	FW	NOR	Daniel Fredheim Holm
42	MF	USA	Mix Diskerud

== Transfers ==
=== Winter ===
In: Note: Flags indicate national team as defined under FIFA eligibility rules; some limited exceptions apply. Players may hold more than one non-FIFA nationality.

No.	Pos.	Nation	Player
2	DF	DEN	Peter Ankersen (from (Denmark) VB Kolding)
11	FW	NOR	Steffen Iversen (from (England) Crystal Palace)
18	MF	NOR	Daniel Berntsen (from (Norway) Bodø/Glimt)
24	DF	NOR	Stefan Strandberg (from (Norway) Vålerenga)

Out: Note: Flags indicate national team as defined under FIFA eligibility rules; some limited exceptions apply. Players may hold more than one non-FIFA nationality.

No.	Pos.	Nation	Player
2	DF	SWE	Mikael Lustig (to (Scotland) Celtic)
10	FW	NOR	Morten Moldskred (to (Denmark) AGF)
11	FW	CIV	Boti Goa (to (Georgia (country)) Zestafoni)
18	DF	URU	Alejandro Lago (to (Uruguay) Montevideo Wanderers)
21	FW	NOR	Mushaga Bakenga (to (Belgium) Club Brugge)

=== Summer ===
In: Note: Flags indicate national team as defined under FIFA eligibility rules; some limited exceptions apply. Players may hold more than one non-FIFA nationality.

No.	Pos.	Nation	Player
4	DF	NOR	Tore Reginiussen (from (Denmark) OB)
12	MF	NOR	Alexander Lund Hansen (from (Norway) Start)
13	MF	ESA	Jaime Alas (from (El Salvador) Luis Ángel Firpo)
17	FW	NOR	Tarik Elyounoussi (from (Norway) Fredrikstad)
42	MF	USA	Mix Diskerud (from (Norway) Stabæk)

Out: Note: Flags indicate national team as defined under FIFA eligibility rules; some limited exceptions apply. Players may hold more than one non-FIFA nationality.

No.	Pos.	Nation	Player
2	DF	DEN	Peter Ankersen (to (Denmark) Esbjerg)
4	DF	DEN	Jim Larsen (to (Belgium) Club Brugge)
16	DF	NOR	Simen Wangberg (to (Norway) Brann)
18	MF	NOR	Daniel Berntsen (loan to (Norway) Fredrikstad)
19	MF	NOR	Markus Henriksen (to (Netherlands) AZ)
23	MF	NOR	Gjermund Åsen (loan to Ranheim)
27	FW	NOR	Michael Jamtfall (Retired)

== Competitions ==
=== Tippeligaen ===
==== Results summary ====
Overall								Home						Away					
Pld	W	D	L	GF	GA	GD	Pts	W	D	L	GF	GA	GD	W	D	L	GF	GA	GD
30	15	10	5	53	26	+27	55	8	5	2	28	11	+17	7	5	3	25	15	+10

==== Results by round ====
Round	1	2	3	4	5	6	7	8	9	10	11	12	13	14	15	16	17	18	19	20	21	22	23	24	25	26	27	28	29	30
Ground	H	A	H	A	H	A	H	A	H	H	A	H	A	H	A	H	A	H	A	H	A	H	A	H	A	H	A	A	H	A
Result	W	D	D	W	W	D	W	D	L	D	D	D	W	W	W	D	D	W	W	D	W	W	L	W	W	W	L	L	L	W
Position	2	2	5	2	1	3	2	1	3	5	4	5	4	3	3	3	3	3	3	3	3	3	3	3	2	1	2	3	3	3

Source: see below
A = Away; H = Home; W = Win; D = Draw; L = Loss

==== Results ====
25 March 2012 1	Rosenborg	3–1	Brann	Trondheim
20:00 CET (UTC+1)	Iversen 9'; Larsen 54'; Prica 81' (yellow card) 85'	Summary	Nordkvelle (yellow card) 13'; Austin (yellow card) 48'; Askar 60'	Stadium: Lerkendal Stadion; Attendance: 13,166; Referee: Tom Harald Hagen

1 April 2012 2	Lillestrøm	2–2	Rosenborg	Lillestrøm
20:00 CEST (UTC+2)	Andersson 7'; Rodgers 78'	Summary	Iversen 11'; Dorsin 90+4'	Stadium: Åråsen Stadion; Attendance: 9,238; Referee: Brage Sandmoen

9 April 2012 3	Rosenborg	0–0	Sogndal	Trondheim
18:00 CEST (UTC+2)		Summary		Stadium: Lerkendal Stadion; Attendance: 12,784; Referee: Kjetil Sælen

13 April 2012 4	Fredrikstad	1–2	Rosenborg	Fredrikstad
19:00 CEST (UTC+2)	Holm 36'	Summary	Iversen 54'; Larsen 79'	Stadium: Fredrikstad Stadion; Attendance: 9,035; Referee: Svein Oddvar Moen

22 April 2012 5	Rosenborg	3–0	Tromsø	Trondheim
20:00 CEST (UTC+2)	Henriksen 64'; Dorsin 72'; Svensson 90+3'	Summary		Stadium: Lerkendal Stadion; Attendance: 12,575; Referee: Tommy Skjerven

27 April 2012 6	Aalesund	2–2	Rosenborg	Ålesund
19:00 CEST (UTC+2)	Fuhre 42'; Tollås 90+1'	Summary	Prica 8'; Iversen 84'	Stadium: Color Line Stadion; Attendance: 9,945; Referee: Svein Oddvar Moen

4 May 2012 7	Rosenborg	3–1	Stabæk	Trondheim
18:00 CEST (UTC+2)	Midtsjø 70'; Dočkal 75'; Svensson 80'	Summary	Boli 86'	Stadium: Lerkendal Stadion; Attendance: 12,143; Referee: Andres Johansen

13 May 2012 8	Sandnes Ulf	1–1	Rosenborg	Sandnes
18:00 CEST (UTC+2)	Skjølsvik 67' (pen.)	Summary	Prica 81'; Prica (yellow card) 77' (yellow-red card) 88'	Stadium: Sandnes Idrettspark; Attendance: 4,806; Referee: Svein-Erik Edvartsen

16 May 2012 9	Rosenborg	0–1	Hønefoss	Trondheim
18:00 CEST (UTC+2)		Summary	Dahl 87'	Stadium: Lerkendal Stadion; Attendance: 20,572; Referee: Per Ivar Staberg

20 May 2012 10	Rosenborg	0–0	Odd Grenland	Trondheim
20:00 CEST (UTC+2)		Summary	Samuelsen (yellow card) 82' (yellow-red card) 90+2'	Stadium: Lerkendal Stadion; Attendance: 9,822; Referee: Svein Oddvar Moen

23 May 2012 11	Vålerenga	0–0	Rosenborg	Oslo
20:00 CEST (UTC+2)		Summary		Stadium: Ullevaal Stadion; Attendance: 13,989; Referee: Tommy Skjerven

24 June 2012 12	Rosenborg	3–3	Strømsgodset	Trondheim
18:00 CEST (UTC+2)	Sætra 4' (o.g.); Dočkal 45+1' (pen.), 77'	Summary	Kamara 44', 65', 74'	Stadium: Lerkendal Stadion; Attendance: 16,095; Referee: Svein Oddvar Moen

30 June 2012 13	Viking	1–4	Rosenborg	Stavanger
20:00 CEST (UTC+2)	Danielsen 21'	Summary	Holm 23'; Dočkal 70'; Chibuike 90'; Prica 90+2'	Stadium: Viking Stadion; Attendance: 10,059; Referee: Brage Sandmoen

8 July 2012 14	Rosenborg	1–0	Molde	Trondheim
18:00 CEST (UTC+2)	Svensson 49'	Summary		Stadium: Lerkendal Stadion; Attendance: 15,979; Referee: Tommy Skjerven

15 July 2012 15	Haugesund	0–1	Rosenborg	Haugesund
20:00 CEST (UTC+2)		Summary	Dočkal 49'	Stadium: Haugesund Stadion; Attendance: 4,935; Referee: Per Ivar Staberg

23 July 2012 16	Rosenborg	1–1	Lillestrøm	Trondheim
19:00	Rønning 55'	Summary	Moen 14'	Stadium: Lerkendal Stadion; Attendance: 13,696; Referee: Ken Henry Johnsen

29 July 2012 17	Tromsø	1–1	Rosenborg	Tromsø
20:00 CEST (UTC+2)	Ondrášek 69'	Summary	Holm 10'	Stadium: Alfheim Stadion; Attendance: 5,299; Referee: Tom Harald Hagen

5 August 2012 18	Rosenborg	3–0	Aalesund	Trondheim
20:00 CEST (UTC+2)	Dočkal 36'; Prica 38'; Strandberg 56'	Summary		Stadium: Lerkendal Stadion; Attendance: 11,475; Referee: Kjetil Sælen

12 August 2012 19	Sogndal	0–3	Rosenborg	Sogndalsfjøra
18:00 CEST (UTC+2)		Summary	Dočkal 70' (pen.), 75' (pen.); Chibuike 90+2'	Stadium: Fosshaugane Campus; Attendance: 4,323; Referee: Svein-Erik Edvartsen

26 August 2012 20	Rosenborg	1–1	Viking	Trondheim
19:00 CEST (UTC+2)	Dorsin 90+4'	Summary	Nisja 41'	Stadium: Lerkendal Stadion; Attendance: 12,064; Referee: Tommy Skjerven

3 September 2012 21	Stabæk	0–2	Rosenborg	Bærum
19:00 CEST (UTC+2)	Larsen (red card) 86'	Summary	Iversen 49', 54'	Stadium: Nadderud Stadion; Attendance: 5,284; Referee: Svein-Erik Edvartsen

16 September 2012 22	Rosenborg	3–0	Vålerenga	Trondheim
19:00 CEST (UTC+2)	Prica 32', 41'; Selnæs 90+2'	Summary	Diamanka (yellow card) 36' (yellow-red card) 44'	Stadium: Lerkendal Stadion; Attendance: 14,483; Referee: Svein-Erik Edvartsen

23 September 2012 23	Brann	2–1	Rosenborg	Bergen
19:00 CEST (UTC+2)	Finne 86', 89'	Report	Chibuike 55'	Stadium: Brann Stadion; Attendance: 14,802; Referee: Espen Berntsen

28 September 2012 24	Rosenborg	5–2	Haugesund	Trondheim
19:00 CEST (UTC+2)	Søderlund 47' (o.g.); Dočkal 55'; Prica 68'; Chibuike 83'; Diskerud 88'	Summary	Fevang 17', 73'	Stadium: Lerkendal Stadion; Attendance: 11,249; Referee: Anders Johansen

7 October 2012 25	Odd Grenland	0–1	Rosenborg	Skien
19:00 CEST (UTC+2)		Summary	Prica 73'	Stadium: Skagerak Arena; Attendance: 5,663; Referee: Brage Sandmoen

19 October 2012 26	Rosenborg	2–0	Sandnes Ulf	Trondheim
19:00 CEST (UTC+2)	Dočkal 43' (pen.); Dorsin 82'	Summary		Stadium: Lerkendal Stadion; Attendance: 12,551; Referee: Espen Berntsen

28 October 2012 27	Molde	2–0	Rosenborg	Molde
18:00 CET (UTC+1)	P.Diouf 60'; Hussain 90+4'	Summary		Stadium: Aker Stadion; Attendance: 11,112; Referee: Svein Oddvar Moen

4 November 2012 28	Strømsgodset	2–1	Rosenborg	Drammen
19:00 CET (UTC+1)	Kamara 67'; Kovács 76'	Summary	Prica 64'	Stadium: Marienlyst Stadion; Attendance: 7,451; Referee: Tommy Skjerven

11 November 2012 29	Rosenborg	0–1	Fredrikstad	Trondheim
18:00 CET (UTC+1)		Summary	Stene 31'	Stadium: Lerkendal Stadion; Attendance: 12,258; Referee: Brage Sandmoen

18 November 2012 30	Hønefoss	1–4	Rosenborg	Hønefoss
18:00 CET (UTC+1)	Riski 74'	Summary	Strandberg 26'; Holm 57'; Prica 69'; Rønning 76'	Stadium: Aka Arena; Attendance: 3,416; Referee: Svein-Erik Edvartsen

==== Table ====
Pos	Team	Pld	W	D	L	GF	GA	GD	Pts	Qualification or relegation
1	Molde (C)	30	19	5	6	51	31	+20	62	Qualification for the Champions League second qualifying round
2	Strømsgodset	30	17	7	6	62	40	+22	58	Qualification for the Europa League second qualifying round (Note: Hødd, which played in the 2012 First Division, also qualified for the 2013–14 UEFA Europa League second qualifying round as winners of the 2012 Norwegian Cup.)
3	Rosenborg	30	15	10	5	53	26	+27	55	Qualification for the Europa League first qualifying round (Note: Tromsø qualified for the first qualifying round of the UEFA Europa League via the UEFA Fair Play ranking.)
4	Tromsø	30	14	7	9	45	32	+13	49	Qualification for the Europa League first qualifying round
5	Viking	30	14	7	9	41	36	+5	49	

Source: fotball.no
Rules for classification: 1) points; 2) goal difference; 3) number of goals scored.
(C) Champions

=== Norwegian Cup ===
1 May 2012 First Round	Tiller	0–8	Rosenborg	Trondheim
18:00 CEST (UTC+2)		Summary	Henriksen 10', 16'; Midtsjø 14', 69'; Dočkal 44', 48'; Svensson 57'; Strandberg 75'	Stadium: Tonstad kunstgress Attendance: 1,800; Referee: Kjetil Thorsø Hansen

9 May 2012 Second Round	Harstad	0–7	Rosenborg	Harstad
18:00 CEST (UTC+2)		Summary	Iversen 18', 28'; Svensson 19'; Dočkal 27', 74', 85'; Midtsjø 66'	Stadium: Harstad stadion Attendance: 3,500; Referee: Espen Eskås

20 June 2012 Third Round	Rosenborg	4–0	Kvik Halden	Trondheim
18:00 CEST (UTC+2)	Henriksen 32'; Prica 61'; Chibuike 62', 75'	Summary		Stadium: Lerkendal Stadion; Attendance: 1,000; Referee: Kim Rune Borgersen

27 June 2012 Fourth Round	Molde	4–3	Rosenborg	Molde
17:00 CEST (UTC+2)	Angan 39'; Hovland 52'; Hoseth 63' (pen.); Eikrem 89'	Summary	Prica 20'; Rønning 41'; Dočkal 74' (pen.)	Stadium: Aker Stadion; Attendance: 7,327; Referee: Tom Harald Hagen

=== Europa League ===
==== Qualifying phase ====
5 July 2012 1st qualifying round 1st leg	Crusaders (Northern Ireland)	0–3	(Norway) Rosenborg	Belfast, Northern Ireland
21:00 CEST (UTC+2)	Caddell (red card) 74'	Report	Dorsin 19', 76'; Dočkal 71'	Stadium: Seaview; Attendance: 862; Referee: Dawid Piasecki (Poland)

12 July 2012 1st qualifying round 2nd leg	Rosenborg (Norway)	1–0 (4–0 agg.)	(Northern Ireland) Crusaders	Trondheim, Norway
19:00 CEST (UTC+2)	Ankersen 81'	Report		Stadium: Lerkendal Stadion; Attendance: 3,688; Referee: Jonathan Lardot (Belgium)

19 July 2012 2nd qualifying round 1st leg	Rosenborg (Norway)	2–2	(Kazakhstan) Ordabasy	Trondheim, Norway
19:00 CEST (UTC+2)	Dočkal 33', 45+2' (pen.)	Report	Pakholiuk 75'; Mansour 90+3'	Stadium: Lerkendal Stadion; Attendance: 3,709; Referee: Ruddy Buquet (France)

26 July 2012 2nd qualifying round 2nd leg	Ordabasy (Kazakhstan)	1–2 (3–4 agg.)	(Norway) Rosenborg	Almaty, Kazakhstan^{3}
16:00 CEST (UTC+2)	Mansour 32'	Report	Fredheim Holm 67'; Wangberg (red card) 77'; Prica (yellow card) 60' (yellow-red card) 83'; Dočkal 90+4'	Stadium: Central Stadium; Attendance: 22,000; Referee: Rene Eisner (Austria)

2 August 2012 3rd qualifying round 1st leg	Servette (Switzerland)	1–1	(Norway) Rosenborg	Geneva, Switzerland
19:45 CEST (UTC+2)	Schneider 68'	Report	Dočkal 81'	Stadium: Stade de Genève; Attendance: 5,722; Referee: Simon Lee Evans (Wales)

9 August 2012 3rd qualifying round 2nd leg	Rosenborg (Norway)	0–0 ((a) 1–1 agg.)	(Switzerland) Servette	Trondheim, Norway
19:00 CEST (UTC+2)		Report	De Azevedo (red card) 90+4'	Stadium: Lerkendal Stadion; Attendance: 6,725; Referee: Neil Doyle (Republic of Ireland)

23 August 2012 Playoff round 1st leg	Legia Warsaw (Poland)	1–1	(Norway) Rosenborg	Warsaw, Poland
19:00 CEST (UTC+2)	Kosecki 42'	Report	Dočkal 80'	Stadium: Pepsi Arena; Attendance: 21,637; Referee: Aleksandar Stavrev (Macedonia)

30 August 2012 Playoff round 2nd leg	Rosenborg (Norway)	2–1 (3–2 agg.)	(Poland) Legia Warsaw	Trondheim, Norway
19:00 CEST (UTC+2)	Reginiussen 69'; Diskerud 87'	Report	Ljuboja 36'	Stadium: Lerkendal Stadion; Attendance: 8,712; Referee: Daniele Orsato (Italy)

==== Group stage ====
Pos	Team	Pld	W	D	L	GF	GA	GD	Pts	Qualification
1	(Ukraine) Metalist Kharkiv	6	4	1	1	9	3	+6	13 (Note: Head-to-head points: Metalist Kharkiv 4, Bayer Leverkusen 1.)	Advance to knockout phase
2	(Germany) Bayer Leverkusen	6	4	1	1	9	2	+7	13	Advance to knockout phase
3	(Norway) Rosenborg	6	2	0	4	7	10	−3	6	
4	(Austria) Rapid Wien	6	1	0	5	4	14	−10	3	

Source: Soccerway
Notes:

20 September 2012 1	Rapid Wien (Austria)	1–2	(Norway) Rosenborg	Vienna, Austria^{1}
21:05 CEST (UTC+2)	Katzer 66'	Report	Elyounoussi 18'; Dorsin 60'	Stadium: Ernst-Happel-Stadion; Attendance: 0^{2} Referee: Stanislav Todorov (Bulgaria)

4 October 2012 2	Rosenborg (Norway)	0–1	(Germany) Bayer Leverkusen	Trondheim, Norway
19:00 CEST (UTC+2)		Report	Kießling 76'	Stadium: Lerkendal Stadion; Attendance: 12,587; Referee: Michael Oliver (England)

25 October 2012 3	Rosenborg (Norway)	1–2	(Ukraine) Metalist Kharkiv	Trondheim, Norway
19:00 CEST (UTC+2)	Elyounoussi 46'	Report	Marlos 81'; Cleiton Xavier 89'	Stadium: Lerkendal Stadion; Attendance: 10,935; Referee: Olegário Benquerença (Portugal)

8 November 2012 4	Metalist Kharkiv (Ukraine)	3–1	(Norway) Rosenborg	Kharkiv, Ukraine
21:05 CET (UTC+1)	Taison 4'; Cleiton Xavier 70'; Torres 90+3'	Report	Dočkal 42'	Stadium: Metalist Stadium; Attendance: 34,235; Referee: Matej Jug (Slovenia)

22 November 2012 5	Rosenborg (Norway)	3–2	(Austria) Rapid Wien	Trondheim, Norway
19:00 CET (UTC+1)	Chibuike 28'; Elyounoussi 76'; Prica 79'	Report	Schrammel 53'; Boyd 66'	Stadium: Lerkendal Stadion; Attendance: 8,320; Referee: Gediminas Mažeika (Lithuania)

6 December 2012 6	Bayer Leverkusen (Germany)	1–0	(Norway) Rosenborg	Leverkusen, Germany
21:05 CET (UTC+1)	Riedel 65'	Report		Stadium: BayArena; Attendance: 10,513; Referee: Leontios Trattou (Cyprus)

Notes

- Note 1: Rapid Wien played their home matches at Ernst-Happel-Stadion, Vienna instead of their regular stadium, Gerhard-Hanappi-Stadion, Vienna.
- Note 2: The Rapid Wien v Rosenborg match was played behind closed doors due to the punishment handed to Rapid Wien by UEFA following incidents at their play-off round first leg against PAOK on 23 August 2012.
- Note 3: Ordabasy played their home match at Central Stadium, Almaty instead of their regular stadium, Kazhimukan Munaitpasov Stadium, Shymkent.

== Squad statistics ==
=== Appearances and goals ===
No.	Pos	Nat	Player	Total		Tippeligaen		Norwegian Cup		Europa League	
No.	Pos	Nat	Player	Apps	Goals	Apps	Goals	Apps	Goals	Apps	Goals
1	GK	(Sweden) SWE	Daniel Örlund	42	0	28+0	0	3+0	0	11+0	0
2	DF	(Costa Rica) CRC	Cristian Gamboa	16	0	9+1	0	0+0	0	6+0	0
3	DF	(Sweden) SWE	Mikael Dorsin	43	7	28+0	4	2+0	0	13+0	3
4	DF	(Norway) NOR	Tore Reginiussen	17	1	9+2	0	0+0	0	6+0	1
5	DF	(Norway) NOR	Per Verner Rønning	30	3	12+2	2	3+0	1	12+1	0
7	MF	(Ghana) GHA	Mohammed-Awal Issah	23	0	10+2	0	1+1	0	7+2	0
8	MF	(Czech Republic) CZE	Bořek Dočkal	43	23	27+0	10	3+1	6	12+0	7
9	FW	(Sweden) SWE	Rade Prica	41	14	16+10	11	2+1	2	9+3	1
10	MF	(Nigeria) NGR	John Chibuike	33	7	17+6	4	2+0	2	6+2	1
11	FW	(Norway) NOR	Steffen Iversen	31	8	12+9	6	1+1	2	1+7	0
12	GK	(Norway) NOR	Alexander Lund Hansen	6	0	2+1	0	0+0	0	3+0	0
13	MF	(El Salvador) ESA	Jaime Alas	5	0	0+3	0	0+0	0	0+2	0
14	DF	(Norway) NOR	Jon Inge Høiland	26	0	18+1	0	0+0	0	5+2	0
17	FW	(Norway) NOR	Tarik Elyounoussi	19	3	10+1	0	0+0	0	8+0	3
20	MF	(Norway) NOR	Ole Kristian Selnæs	34	1	12+10	1	4+0	0	3+5	0
21	MF	(Norway) NOR	Fredrik Midtsjø	14	4	2+6	1	4+0	3	1+1	0
22	MF	(Norway) NOR	Jonas Svensson	45	5	24+3	3	3+1	2	13+1	0
24	DF	(Norway) NOR	Stefan Strandberg	36	3	23+0	2	3+0	1	9+1	0
26	GK	(Norway) NOR	Erik Bråthen	3	0	0+0	0	3+0	0	0+0	0
28	FW	(Norway) NOR	Daniel Fredheim Holm	42	4	22+6	3	1+1	0	10+2	1
32	DF	(Norway) NOR	Lars Arne Togstad	2	0	0+0	0	0+2	0	0+0	0
35	MF	(Norway) NOR	Magnus Blakstad	1	0	0+0	0	0+1	0	0+0	0
42	MF	(United States) USA	Mix Diskerud	18	2	10+1	1	0+0	0	6+1	1
		(Norway) NOR	Christoffer Aasbakk	1	0	0+0	0	0+1	0	0+0	0
Players away from Rosenborg on loan:
18	MF	(Norway) NOR	Daniel Berntsen	3	0	0+1	0	0+1	0	1+0	0
Players who left Rosenborg during the season:
2	DF	(Denmark) DEN	Peter Ankersen	18	1	4+6	0	4+0	0	4+0	1
4	DF	(Denmark) DEN	Jim Larsen	11	2	11+0	2	0+0	0	0+0	0
16	DF	(Norway) NOR	Simen Wangberg	17	0	6+4	0	4+0	0	2+1	0
19	MF	(Norway) NOR	Markus Henriksen	28	4	18+0	1	3+0	3	7+0	0

=== Goal scorers ===
Place	Position	Nation	Number	Name	Tippeligaen	Norwegian Cup	Europa League	Total
1	MF	(Czech Republic)	8	Bořek Dočkal	10	6	7	23
2	FW	(Sweden)	9	Rade Prica	11	2	1	14
3	FW	(Norway)	11	Steffen Iversen	6	2	0	8
4	MF	(Nigeria)	10	John Chibuike	4	2	1	7
4	DF	(Sweden)	3	Mikael Dorsin	4	0	3	7
6	MF	(Norway)	22	Jonas Svensson	3	2	0	5
7	FW	(Norway)	28	Daniel Fredheim Holm	3	0	1	4
7	MF	(Norway)	19	Markus Henriksen	1	3	0	4
7	MF	(Norway)	21	Fredrik Midtsjø	1	3	0	4
10	DF	(Norway)	24	Stefan Strandberg	2	1	0	3
10	DF	(Norway)	5	Per Verner Rønning	2	1	0	3
10	FW	(Norway)	17	Tarik Elyounoussi	0	0	3	3
13	DF	(Denmark)	4	Jim Larsen	2	0	0	2
13				Own goal	2	0	0	2
13	MF	(United States)	42	Mix Diskerud	1	0	1	2
16	MF	(Norway)	20	Ole Kristian Selnæs	1	0	0	1
16	DF	(Denmark)	2	Peter Ankersen	0	0	1	1
16	DF	(Norway)	4	Tore Reginiussen	0	0	1	1
				TOTALS	53	22	19	94

=== Disciplinary record ===
Number	Nation	Position	Name	Tippeligaen		Norwegian Cup		Europa League		Total	
Number	Nation	Position	Name	Yellow card	Red card	Yellow card	Red card	Yellow card	Red card	Yellow card	Red card
1	(Sweden)	GK	Daniel Örlund	1	0	0	0	0	0	1	0
2	(Denmark)	DF	Peter Ankersen	2	0	0	0	2	0	2	0
2	(Costa Rica)	DF	Cristian Gamboa	0	0	0	0	1	0	1	0
3	(Sweden)	DF	Mikael Dorsin	4	0	0	0	2	0	2	0
4	(Norway)	DF	Tore Reginiussen	2	0	0	0	0	0	2	0
4	(Denmark)	DF	Jim Larsen	3	0	0	0	0	0	3	0
5	(Norway)	DF	Per Verner Rønning	2	0	0	0	2	0	4	0
7	(Ghana)	MF	Mohammed-Awal Issah	6	0	0	0	0	0	6	0
8	(Czech Republic)	MF	Bořek Dočkal	5	0	1	0	1	0	7	0
9	(Sweden)	FW	Rade Prica	8	1	1	0	3	1	12	2
10	(Nigeria)	MF	John Chibuike	2	0	0	0	0	0	2	0
14	(Norway)	DF	Jon Inge Høiland	2	0	0	0	0	0	2	0
16	(Norway)	DF	Simen Wangberg	1	0	0	0	1	1	2	1
19	(Norway)	MF	Markus Henriksen	1	0	1	0	0	0	2	0
20	(Norway)	MF	Fredrik Midtsjø	1	0	0	0	0	0	1	0
22	(Norway)	MF	Jonas Svensson	1	0	0	0	5	0	6	0
24	(Norway)	DF	Stefan Strandberg	5	0	0	0	2	0	7	0
28	(Norway)	FW	Daniel Fredheim Holm	0	0	0	0	3	0	3	0
42	(United States)	MF	Mix Diskerud	1	0	0	0	3	0	4	0
			TOTALS	46	1	3	0	25	2	74	3
