= 2013 Rosenborg BK season =

Rosenborg
2013 season
- Chairman: Ivar Koteng
- Manager: Per Joar Hansen
- Stadium: Lerkendal Stadion
- Tippeligaen: 2nd
- Norwegian Cup: Runners-up
- Europa League: Second qualifying round vs St Johnstone
- Top goalscorer: League: John Chibuike (9); All: Nicki Bille Nielsen (16)
- Highest home attendance: 20,188 vs Molde; 20 May 2013
- Lowest home attendance: 4,003 vs Crusaders; 11 July 2013
- Average home league attendance: 14,806 ▲10.5% (in Tippeligaen); 12,687 (in all competitions)
Home colours	Away colours	Third colours

The 2013 season was Rosenborg's 23rd consecutive year in Tippeligaen, their 46th season in the top flight of Norwegian football and first season with Per Joar Hansen as manager. They participated in the Tippeligaen, finishing second, the Cup and the 2013–14 UEFA Europa League, entering at the First qualifying round stage and reaching the Second qualifying round before an aggregate defeat to St Johnstone.

== Squad ==
Note: Flags indicate national team as defined under FIFA eligibility rules; some limited exceptions apply. Players may hold more than one non-FIFA nationality.

No.	Pos.	Nation	Player
1	GK	SWE	Daniel Örlund
2	DF	CRC	Cristian Gamboa
3	DF	SWE	Mikael Dorsin (vice-captain)
4	DF	NOR	Tore Reginiussen (captain)
5	DF	NOR	Per Verner Rønning
7	MF	DEN	Mike Jensen
9	FW	DEN	Nicki Bille Nielsen
10	MF	NGR	John Chibuike
11	FW	DEN	Tobias Mikkelsen
12	GK	NOR	Alexander Lund Hansen
14	DF	NOR	Jon Inge Høiland
15	FW	NOR	Alexander Søderlund

No.	Pos.	Nation	Player
16	DF	NOR	Jørgen Skjelvik
18	MF	NOR	Daniel Berntsen
19	DF	NOR	Brede Moe
20	MF	NOR	Ole Kristian Selnæs
21	MF	NOR	Fredrik Midtsjø
22	MF	NOR	Jonas Svensson
23	FW	NOR	Pål André Helland
24	DF	NOR	Stefan Strandberg
26	GK	NOR	Erik Bråthen
37	FW	NOR	Alexander Sørloth
42	MF	USA	Mix Diskerud

== On loan ==
Note: Flags indicate national team as defined under FIFA eligibility rules; some limited exceptions apply. Players may hold more than one non-FIFA nationality.

No.	Pos.	Nation	Player
13	MF	ESA	Jaime Alas (on loan to San Jose Earthquakes)

== Transfers ==
=== Winter ===
In: Note: Flags indicate national team as defined under FIFA eligibility rules; some limited exceptions apply. Players may hold more than one non-FIFA nationality.

No.	Pos.	Nation	Player
2	DF	CRC	Cristian Gamboa (from (Denmark) Copenhagen, previously on loan)
7	MF	DEN	Mike Jensen (from (Denmark) Brøndby)
9	FW	DEN	Nicki Bille Nielsen (from (Spain) Villarreal)
11	FW	DEN	Tobias Mikkelsen (from (Germany) Greuther Fürth)

Out: Note: Flags indicate national team as defined under FIFA eligibility rules; some limited exceptions apply. Players may hold more than one non-FIFA nationality.

No.	Pos.	Nation	Player
9	FW	SWE	Rade Prica (to (Israel) Maccabi Tel Aviv)
11	FW	NOR	Steffen Iversen (Retired)
28	MF	NOR	Daniel Fredheim Holm (to (Norway) Vålerenga)

=== Summer ===
In: Note: Flags indicate national team as defined under FIFA eligibility rules; some limited exceptions apply. Players may hold more than one non-FIFA nationality.

No.	Pos.	Nation	Player
15	FW	NOR	Alexander Søderlund (from (Norway) Haugesund)
16	DF	NOR	Jørgen Skjelvik (from (Sweden) Kalmar)
23	FW	NOR	Pål André Helland (from (Norway) Hødd)

Out: Note: Flags indicate national team as defined under FIFA eligibility rules; some limited exceptions apply. Players may hold more than one non-FIFA nationality.

No.	Pos.	Nation	Player
8	MF	CZE	Bořek Dočkal (to (Czech Republic) Sparta Prague)
13	MF	ESA	Jaime Alas (to (United States) San Jose Earthquakes, on loan)
17	FW	NOR	Tarik Elyounoussi (to (Germany) Hoffenheim)
—	MF	GHA	Mohammed-Awal Issah (to (South Africa) Amazulu)

== Competitions ==
=== Tippeligaen ===
==== Results summary ====
Overall								Home						Away					
Pld	W	D	L	GF	GA	GD	Pts	W	D	L	GF	GA	GD	W	D	L	GF	GA	GD
30	18	8	4	50	25	+25	62	9	5	1	23	10	+13	9	3	3	27	15	+12

Last updated: 19 November 2013.
Source: see below

==== Results by round ====
Round	1	2	3	4	5	6	7	8	9	10	11	12	13	14	15	16	17	18	19	20	21	22	23	24	25	26	27	28	29	30
Ground	A	H	A	H	A	H	A	H	A	H	H	A	H	A	H	H	A	H	A	H	A	H	A	H	A	H	A	A	H	A
Result	W	W	W	D	L	L	D	W	W	W	D	W	W	D	W	W	W	W	D	D	W	W	L	D	W	D	W	L	W	W
Position	6	1	1	2	2	5	5	3	2	2	2	2	2	2	2	1	1	1	1	1	1	1	1	1	1	2	2	2	2	2

Updated to match(es) played on 19 November 2013. Source: see below
A = Away; H = Home; W = Win; D = Draw; L = Loss

==== Results ====
17 March 2013 1	Odd	0–1	Rosenborg	Skien
19:00 CET (UTC+1)	Johnsen (penalty missed)	Summary	Jensen 71'	Stadium: Skagerak Arena; Attendance: 4,601; Referee: Tom Harald Hagen

1 April 2013 2	Rosenborg	4–0	Brann	Trondheim
18:00 CEST (UTC+2)	Dorsin 48', 90+1'; Diskerud 53'; Dočkal 85'	Summary	Larsen (yellow card) 34'; Haugen (yellow card) 45'; Pusic (yellow card) 82'	Stadium: Lerkendal Stadion; Attendance: 16,009; Referee: Svein Erik Edvartsen

5 April 2013 3	Sogndal	0–4	Rosenborg	Sogndalsfjøra
19:00 CEST (UTC+2)		Summary	Svensson (yellow card) 11' (goal) 45+2'; Mikkelsen 31'; Nielsen 45'; Elyounoussi 76'	Stadium: Fosshaugane Campus; Attendance: 3,154; Referee: Anders Johansen

12 April 2013 4	Rosenborg	1–1	Start	Trondheim
19:00 CET (UTC+2)	Elyounoussi 8'; Nielsen (yellow card) 65'	Summary	Kristjánsson (yellow card) 45'; Mathisen (yellow card) 52'; Acosta (yellow card) 65'; Owello (yellow card) 68'; Børufsen 87'	Stadium: Lerkendal Stadion; Attendance: 15,662; Referee: Tom Harald Hagen

21 April 2013 5	Haugesund	3–1	Rosenborg	Haugesund
19:00 CET (UTC+2)	Bamberg 15' (pen.); Gytkjær (yellow card) 26'; Søderlund 35'; Andreassen 89'	Summary	Nielsen (penalty missed); Diskerud 51'; Gamboa (yellow card) 25' (yellow-red card) 66'	Stadium: Haugesund Stadion; Attendance: 5,391; Referee: Kjetil Sælen

28 April 2013 6	Rosenborg	0–1	Sandnes Ulf	Trondheim
18:00 CET (UTC+2)	Reginiussen (red card) 65'; Nielsen (yellow card) 45' (yellow-red card) 90'	Summary	Þorsteinsson 23'; Hoiland (yellow card) 32'; McDermott (yellow card) 90'	Stadium: Lerkendal Stadion; Attendance: 12,301; Referee: Tore Hansen

4 May 2013 7	Aalesund	2–2	Rosenborg	Ålesund
18:00 CEST (UTC+2)	James 26'; Ulvestad 52'; Morrison (yellow card) 66'	Summary	Elyounoussi (yellow card) 30', (goal) 65'; Jensen (yellow card) 50'; Chibuike 72'	Stadium: Color Line Stadion; Attendance: 9,385; Referee: Svein Erik Edvartsen

8 May 2013 8	Rosenborg	2–1	Tromsø	Trondheim
19:00 CET (UTC+2)	Strandberg 18'; Elyounoussi 40'	Summary	Fojut (yellow card) 36'; Ondrášek 55'	Stadium: Lerkendal Stadion; Attendance: 12,151; Referee: Tommy Skjerven

13 May 2013 9	Hønefoss	1–2	Rosenborg	Hønefoss
19:00 CET (UTC+2)	Mora (yellow card) 45'; Kaland 50'	Summary	Nielsen 31'; Elyounoussi 43'	Stadium: Aka Arena; Attendance: 3,431; Referee: Brage Sandmoen

16 May 2013 10	Rosenborg	4–2	Sarpsborg 08	Trondheim
19:00 CET (UTC+2)	Nielsen 33', 34', 88' (pen.); Mikkelsen (yellow card) 79'; Elyounoussi 84'	Summary	Ásgeirsson (yellow card) 51'; Olsen 52'; Þórarinsson 65', (yellow card) 72'	Stadium: Lerkendal Stadion; Attendance: 19,015; Referee: Espen Berntsen

20 May 2013 11	Rosenborg	0–0	Molde	Trondheim
18:00 CET (UTC+2)	Nielsen (yellow card) 82'; Elyounoussi (yellow card) 88'	Summary	Chukwu (yellow card) 8'; Hoset (yellow card) 15'; Linnes (red card) 20'	Stadium: Lerkendal Stadion; Attendance: 20,188; Referee: Tom Harald Hagen

26 May 2013 12	Vålerenga	1–2	Rosenborg	Oslo
18:00 CEST (UTC+2)	Lecjaks 87'	Summary	Reginiussen 65'; Svensson 84'	Stadium: Ullevaal Stadion; Attendance: 13,609; Referee: Tommy Skjerven

23 June 2013 13	Rosenborg	1–0	Strømsgodset	Trondheim
18:00 CET (UTC+2)	Jensen 44'	Summary		Stadium: Lerkendal Stadion; Attendance: 19,063; Referee: Svein Oddvar Moen

30 June 2013 14	Viking	0–0	Rosenborg	Stavanger
19:00 CEST (UTC+2)		Summary	Dorsin (yellow card) 6'; Diskerud (yellow card) 43'; Gamboa (yellow card) 90+3'	Stadium: Viking Stadion; Attendance: 9,958; Referee: Brage Sandmoen

7 July 2013 15	Rosenborg	1–0	Lillestrøm	Trondheim
18:00 CET (UTC+2)	Chibuike 64'; Strandberg (yellow card) 73'; Dočkal (yellow card) 90+3'	Summary		Stadium: Lerkendal Stadion; Attendance: 15,014; Referee: Kjetil Sælen

14 July 2013 16	Rosenborg	3–2	Odds	Trondheim
19:00 CET (UTC+2)	Chibuike 39'; Dočkal 45'; Berntsen 62'; Mikkelsen (yellow card) 69'; Dorsin (yellow card) 90+1'; Chibuike (yellow card) 90+3'	Summary	Johnsen 64'; Shala 90+1' (pen.); Samuelsen (yellow card) 86' (yellow-red card) 90+3'	Stadium: Lerkendal Stadion; Attendance: 11,748; Referee: Ken Henry Johnsen

28 July 2013 17	Brann	1–4	Rosenborg	Bergen
18:00 CET (UTC+2)	Haugen (yellow card) 7'; Sævarsson (yellow card) 58'; Mojsov (yellow card) 83'; Askar 90+4'	Summary	Nilsen 7'; Selnæs (yellow card) 22'; Chibuike (yellow card) 25', (goal) 90'; Jensen 53'; Søderlund 56'	Stadium: Brann Stadion; Attendance: 12,678; Referee: Tommy Skjerven

4 August 2013 18	Rosenborg	2–0	Sogndal	Trondheim
18:00 CET (UTC+2)	Reginiussen 9'; Nielsen 87'	Summary		Stadium: Lerkendal Stadion; Attendance: 14,211; Referee: Tom Harald Hagen

11 August 2013 19	Strømsgodset	2–2	Rosenborg	Drammen
18:00 CET (UTC+2)	Kamara 33'; Keita (yellow card) 40'; Storflor 54'; Johansen (yellow card) 59'	Summary	Diskerud (yellow card) 9'; Reginiussen 31'; Jensen (yellow card) 45'; Chibuike 72'	Stadium: Marienlyst Stadion; Attendance: 7,471; Referee: Svein Oddvar Moen

17 August 2013 20	Rosenborg	0–0	Vålerenga	Trondheim
18:00 CEST (UTC+2)	Berntsen (yellow card) 52'; Nielsen (yellow card) 78'; Dorsin (yellow card) 90+4'	Summary	Fellah (yellow card) 56'; Kongshavn (yellow card) 63'; Wawrzynkiewicz (yellow card) 80'; Lecjaks (yellow card) 89'	Stadium: Lerkendal Stadion; Attendance: 13,845; Referee: Ken Henry Johnsen

25 August 2013 21	Sandnes Ulf	2–3	Rosenborg	Sandnes
19:00 CET (UTC+2)	Skjølsvik 31' (pen.); Þorsteinsson (yellow card) 42'; Sola 69'	Summary	Søderlund 1', (yellow card) 34'; Strandberg (yellow card) 31'; Gamboa (yellow card) 53'; Reginiussen 80'; Helland 90'	Stadium: Sandnes Idrettspark; Attendance: 4,034; Referee: Tom Harald Hagen

1 September 2013 22	Rosenborg	2–1	Aalesund	Trondheim
CET (UTC+2)	Mikkelsen 27'; Jensen (yellow card) 64'; Nielsen 85'	Summary	Hamdallah (yellow card) 34'; Matland (yellow card) 58'; Larsen 74'; James (yellow card) 76'	Stadium: Lerkendal Stadion; Attendance: 14,193; Referee: Svein-Erik Edvartsen

15 September 2013 23	Tromsø	1–0	Rosenborg	Tromsø
19:00 CEST (UTC+2)	Andersen 24'	Summary		Stadium: Alfheim Stadion; Attendance: 4,945; Referee: Brage Sandmoen

20 September 2013 24	Rosenborg	1–1	Haugesund	Trondheim
19:00 CET (UTC+1)	Chibuike 21'	Summary	Nilsen (yellow card) 78'; Gytkjær 84'	Stadium: Lerkendal Stadion; Attendance: 11,236; Referee: Ola Nilsen

29 September 2013 25	Sarpsborg 08	1–2	Rosenborg	Sarpsborg
19:00 CET (UTC+2)	Olanare 42' (pen.)	Summary	Chibuike 72'; Helland 74'	Stadium: Sarpsborg Stadion; Attendance: 4,823; Referee: Tommy Skjerven

6 October 2013 26	Rosenborg	0–0	Hønefoss	Trondheim
19:00 CET (UTC+1)		Summary		Stadium: Lerkendal Stadion; Attendance: 12,058; Referee: Trygve Kjensli

19 October 2013 27	Start	0–1	Rosenborg	Kristiansand
18:00 CEST (UTC+2)		Summary	Svensson 84'	Stadium: Sør Arena; Attendance: 7,013; Referee: Svein Erik Edvartsen

26 October 2013 28	Molde	1–0	Rosenborg	Molde
18:00 CEST (UTC+2)	Hoseth 80' (pen.)	Summary		Stadium: Aker Stadion; Attendance: 10,691; Referee: Tom Harald Hagen

3 November 2013 29	Rosenborg	2–1	Viking	Trondheim
18:00 CET (UTC+1)	Søderlund 9'; Mikkelsen (yellow card) 43' (goal) 57'; Bille Nielsen (yellow card) 90+4'	Summary	Olsen 68' (yellow card) 77'	Stadium: Lerkendal Stadion; Attendance: 15,392; Referee: Tore Hansen

10 November 2013 30	Lillestrøm	0–3	Rosenborg	Lillestrøm
18:00 CET (UTC+1)		Summary	Chibuike 7', 72'; Jensen 18'	Stadium: Åråsen Stadion; Attendance: 8,049; Referee: Espen Berntsen

==== Table ====
Pos	Team	Pld	W	D	L	GF	GA	GD	Pts	Qualification or relegation
1	Strømsgodset (C)	30	19	6	5	66	26	+40	63	Qualification for the Champions League second qualifying round
2	Rosenborg	30	18	8	4	50	25	+25	62	Qualification for the Europa League first qualifying round
3	Haugesund	30	15	6	9	41	39	+2	51	Qualification for the Europa League first qualifying round
4	Aalesund	30	14	7	9	55	44	+11	49	
5	Viking	30	12	10	8	41	36	+5	46	

Source: fotball.no
Rules for classification: 1) points; 2) goal difference; 3) number of goals scored.
(C) Champions

=== Norwegian Cup ===
17 April 2013 First Round	Buvik	0–11	Rosenborg	Buvika
18:00 CEST (UTC+2)		Summary	Selnæs 13'; Moe 17'; Dočkal 21', 79'; Nielsen 24', (yellow card) 30', (goal) 37'; Chibuike 45', (yellow card) 62', (goal) 73'; Elyounoussi 62', 84', 90+2'	Stadium: Buvik Stadion; Attendance: 1,800; Referee: Richard Haugen Lyng

1 May 2013 Second Round	Strindheim	0–5	Rosenborg	Trondheim
18:00 CEST (UTC+2)		Summary	Selnæs (yellow card) 16'; Nielsen 18', 73', 80'; Chibuike 33'; Midtsjø 52'; Alas (yellow card) 70'; Gamboa (yellow card) 77'	Stadium: Strindheim Kunstgress; Attendance: 1,100; Referee: Thomas Solum Lystad

29 May 2013 Third Round	Levanger	1–4	Rosenborg	Levanger
18:00 CEST (UTC+2)	Peterson (yellow card) 33'; Dahlen (yellow card) 87'; Myrslo 90+1'	Summary	Mikkelsen 4'; Midtsjø 20'; Nielsen 37'; Selnæs 81'; Svensson (yellow card) 83'	Stadium: Moan Fritidspark; Attendance: 4,630; Referee: Dag Vidar Hafsås

19 June 2013 Fourth Round	Rosenborg	2–1	Tromsø	Trondheim
18:00 CEST (UTC+2)	Jensen 23', 61'	Summary	Pritchard (yellow card) 45'; Ondrášek 63'	Stadium: Lerkendal Stadion; Attendance: 5,577; Referee: Per Ivar Staberg

21 August 2013 Quarter-finals	Rosenborg	2–1	Vålerenga	Trondheim
18:30 CEST (UTC+2)	Søderlund 78', (yellow card) 82'; Nielsen 90+2'	Summary	Solli (yellow card) 66'; Berre (yellow card) 72'; Børven 87'; Høgh (yellow card) 89'	Stadium: Lerkendal Stadion; Attendance: 7,680; Referee: Tore Hansen

25 September 2013 Semi-finals	Rosenborg	2–1	Haugesund	Trondheim
20:00 CEST (UTC+2)	Mikkelsen 35'; Bille Nielsen 58'	Report	Gytkjær 48'; Cvetinović (yellow card) 60'	Stadium: Lerkendal Stadion; Attendance: 8,438; Referee: Brage Sandmoen

==== Final ====
24 November 2013	Molde	4–2	Rosenborg	Oslo
13:15 CET (UTC+1)	Rindarøy 16'; Hovland (yellow card) 51'; Ekpo (yellow card) 55'; Berget 71'; Hoseth 82'; Høiland 90'	Report	Diskerud 17'; Høiland (yellow card) 25'; Selnæs (yellow card) 30'; Chibuike (yellow card) 33'; Reginiussen 49'; Jensen (yellow card) 86'	Stadium: Ullevaal Stadion; Attendance: 24,824; Referee: Svein Oddvar Moen (SK Haugar)

=== Europa League ===
==== Qualifying phase ====
4 July 2013 1st qualifying round 1st leg	Crusaders (Northern Ireland)	1–2	(Norway) Rosenborg	Belfast, Northern Ireland
19:45 BST (UTC+1)	Owens 22'	Summary	Chibuike 45+2'; Svensson 78'	Stadium: Seaview; Attendance: 948; Referee: Hugo Miguel (Portugal)

11 July 2013 1st qualifying round 2nd leg	Rosenborg (Norway)	7–2 (9–3 agg.)	(Northern Ireland) Crusaders	Trondheim, Norway
19:00 CEST (UTC+2)	Dorsin (yellow card) 8'; Høiland 15'; Chibuike 35', 51'; Dočkal 57'; Mikkelsen 60'; Sørloth 72'; Svensson 90'	Summary	Leeman 49'; Owens 68'	Stadium: Lerkendal Stadion; Attendance: 4,003; Referee: Alexsey Kulbakov (Belarus)

18 July 2013 2nd qualifying round 1st leg	Rosenborg (Norway)	0–1	(Scotland) St Johnstone	Trondheim, Norway
19:00 CEST (UTC+2)		Summary	Wright 18'; Anderson (yellow card) 40'	Stadium: Lerkendal Stadion; Attendance: 5,952; Referee: Halis Özkahya (Turkey

25 July 2013 2nd qualifying round 2nd leg	St Johnstone (Scotland)	1–1 (2–1 agg.)	(Norway) Rosenborg	Perth, Scotland
20:45 BST (UTC+1)	May 21' Fallon (yellow card) 90+1'; Frazer Wright (yellow card) 90+4'; MacLean (yellow card) 90+6'	Summary	Søderlund 5'; Nielsen (yellow card) 73'; Berntsen (yellow card) 75'; Reginiussen (yellow card) 85'	Stadium: McDiarmid Park; Attendance: 7,850; Referee: Miroslav Zelinka (Czech Republic)

=== Copa del Sol ===
==== Group stage ====
25 January 2013	CSKA Moscow (Russia)	2–0	(Norway) Rosenborg	La Manga, Spain
16:00 CET	Mamaev 19'; Tosic 70'	Summary		Stadium: La Manga Stadium; Attendance: 500; Referee: Kristinn Jakobsson (Iceland)

28 January 2013	Shakhtar Donetsk (Ukraine)	1–0	(Norway) Rosenborg	La Manga, Spain
19:00 CET	Douglas Costa 79'	Summary		Stadium: La Manga Stadium; Attendance: 300; Referee: Mattias Gestranius (Finland)

31 January 2013	Olimpija (Slovenia)	0–0 (7–8 p)	(Norway) Rosenborg	La Manga, Spain
19:00 CET		Summary		Stadium: La Manga Stadium; Attendance: 200; Referee: Michael Johansen (Denmark)
	Penalties
	Salkić (penalty scored); Šporar (penalty scored); Valenčič (penalty scored); Mlinar (penalty scored); Zarifović (penalty scored); Kapun (penalty missed); Mitrović (penalty scored); Baskera (penalty scored); Džafić (penalty missed)		(penalty scored) Chibuike; (penalty scored) Sørloth; (penalty scored) Alas; (penalty scored) Dorsin; (penalty scored) Selnæs; (penalty missed) Rønning; (penalty scored) Høiland; (penalty scored) Moe; (penalty scored) Strand

=== Club Friendlies ===
12 February 2013	Rosenborg	0–1	Ranheim	Trondheim
17:05 CET (UTC+1)		Summary	Åsen 8'	Stadium: Lerkendal kunstgress Attendance: 500

17 February 2013	Copenhagen (Denmark)	1–0	(Norway) Rosenborg	Copenhagen, Denmark
17:00 CET (UTC+1)	Sigurdsson 7'	Summary		Stadium: Parken Stadium; Attendance: 1,966

27 February 2013	Rosenborg (Norway)	0–2	(Russia) Spartak Moscow	Marbella, Spain
16:30 CET (UTC+1)		Summary	Movsisyan 30' 54'	Attendance: 40

10 March 2013	Viking	0–0	Rosenborg	Nærbø
17:45 CET (UTC+1)		Summary		Stadium: Nærbø kunstgress Attendance: 741

20 March 2013	Rosenborg	1–0	Byåsen	Trondheim
17:00 CET (UTC+1)	Togstad 5'	Summary		Stadium: Lerkendal kunstgress

13 June 2013	Steinkjer	0–2	Rosenborg	Steinkjer
		Summary	Chibuike 78' (pen.); Ben Feirud 83'	Stadium: Guldbergaunet Stadion; Attendance: 664

== Squad statistics ==
=== Appearances and goals ===
As of match played 24 November 2013

No.	Pos	Nat	Player	Total		Tippeligaen		Norwegian Cup		Europa League	
No.	Pos	Nat	Player	Apps	Goals	Apps	Goals	Apps	Goals	Apps	Goals
1	GK	(Sweden) SWE	Daniel Örlund	27	0	19+0	0	6+0	0	2+0	0
2	DF	(Costa Rica) CRC	Cristian Gamboa	35	0	27+1	0	1+2	0	3+1	0
3	DF	(Sweden) SWE	Mikael Dorsin	36	2	26+0	2	3+3	0	4+0	0
4	DF	(Norway) NOR	Tore Reginiussen	37	4	28+0	4	6+0	0	3+0	0
5	DF	(Norway) NOR	Per Verner Rønning	18	0	8+4	0	2+1	0	3+0	0
7	MF	(Denmark) DEN	Mike Jensen	35	6	26+1	4	4+0	2	3+1	0
9	FW	(Denmark) DEN	Nicki Bille Nielsen	37	15	25+2	8	5+2	7	3+0	0
10	MF	(Nigeria) NGR	John Chibuike	33	16	14+10	9	5+0	4	3+1	3
11	FW	(Denmark) DEN	Tobias Mikkelsen	37	6	24+3	3	5+1	2	3+1	1
12	GK	(Norway) NOR	Alexander Lund Hansen	14	0	11+0	0	1+0	0	2+0	0
14	DF	(Norway) NOR	Jon Inge Høiland	15	1	4+4	0	4+1	0	1+1	1
15	FW	(Norway) NOR	Alexander Søderlund	16	5	9+4	3	1+0	1	1+1	1
16	DF	(Norway) NOR	Jørgen Skjelvik	10	0	4+4	0	2+0	0	0+0	0
18	MF	(Norway) NOR	Daniel Berntsen	18	1	6+5	1	3+0	0	4+0	0
19	DF	(Norway) NOR	Brede Moe	8	1	0+3	0	4+0	1	1+0	0
20	MF	(Norway) NOR	Ole Kristian Selnæs	28	2	10+9	0	6+1	2	1+1	0
21	MF	(Norway) NOR	Fredrik Midtsjø	8	2	0+5	0	3+0	2	0+0	0
22	MF	(Norway) NOR	Jonas Svensson	36	5	24+3	3	4+1	0	3+1	2
23	FW	(Norway) NOR	Pål André Helland	12	2	3+8	2	0+1	0	0+0	0
24	DF	(Norway) NOR	Stefan Strandberg	31	1	23+0	1	5+1	0	1+1	0
37	FW	(Norway) NOR	Alexander Sørloth	1	1	0+0	0	0+0	0	0+1	1
42	MF	(United States) USA	Mix Diskerud	30	2	21+5	2	2+2	0	0+0	0
Players away from Rosenborg on loan:
13	MF	(El Salvador) ESA	Jaime Alas	2	0	0+0	0	2+0	0	0+0	0
Players who left Rosenborg during the season:
8	MF	(Czech Republic) CZE	Bořek Dočkal	21	5	7+8	2	2+0	2	2+2	1
17	FW	(Norway) NOR	Tarik Elyounoussi	17	9	12+1	6	0+4	3	0+0	0

=== Goal scorers ===
As of 19 November 2013

Place	Position	Nation	Number	Name	Tippeligaen	Norwegian Cup	Europa League	Total
1	FW	(Denmark)	9	Nicki Bille Nielsen	8	8	0	16
2	MF	(Nigeria)	10	John Chibuike	9	3	3	15
3	FW	(Norway)	17	Tarik Elyounoussi	6	3	0	9
4	MF	(Denmark)	7	Mike Jensen	4	2	0	6
4	FW	(Denmark)	11	Tobias Mikkelsen	3	2	1	6
6	MF	(Czech Republic)	8	Bořek Dočkal	2	2	1	5
6	MF	(Norway)	22	Jonas Svensson	3	0	2	5
6	FW	(Norway)	15	Alexander Søderlund	3	1	1	5
9	DF	(Norway)	4	Tore Reginiussen	4	0	0	4
10	DF	(Sweden)	3	Mikael Dorsin	2	0	0	2
10	MF	(United States)	42	Mix Diskerud	2	0	0	2
10	FW	(Norway)	23	Pål André Helland	2	0	0	2
10	MF	(Norway)	20	Ole Kristian Selnæs	0	2	0	2
10	MF	(Norway)	21	Fredrik Midtsjø	0	2	0	2
15	DF	(Norway)	24	Stefan Strandberg	1	0	0	1
15	MF	(Norway)	18	Daniel Berntsen	1	0	0	1
15	DF	(Norway)	19	Brede Moe	0	1	0	1
15	DF	(Norway)	14	Jon Inge Høiland	0	0	1	1
15	FW	(Norway)	37	Alexander Sørloth	0	0	1	1
				TOTALS	50	24	10	84

=== Disciplinary record ===
As of 24 November 2013

Number	Nation	Position	Name	Tippeligaen		Norwegian Cup		Europa League		Total	
Number	Nation	Position	Name	Yellow card	Red card	Yellow card	Red card	Yellow card	Red card	Yellow card	Red card
2	(Costa Rica)	DF	Cristian Gamboa	5	1	1	0	0	0	6	1
3	(Sweden)	DF	Mikael Dorsin	3	0	0	0	1	0	4	0
4	(Norway)	DF	Tore Reginiussen	3	1	0	0	1	0	4	1
7	(Denmark)	MF	Mike Jensen	6	0	1	0	0	0	7	0
8	(Czech Republic)	MF	Bořek Dočkal	1	0	0	0	0	0	1	0
9	(Denmark)	FW	Nicki Bille Nielsen	7	1	1	0	1	0	9	1
10	(Nigeria)	MF	John Chibuike	3	0	2	0	0	0	5	0
11	(Denmark)	FW	Tobias Mikkelsen	3	0	0	0	0	0	3	0
13	(El Salvador)	MF	Jaime Alas	0	0	1	0	0	0	1	0
14	(Norway)	DF	Jon Inge Høiland	0	0	1	0	0	0	1	0
15	(Norway)	FW	Alexander Søderlund	1	0	1	0	0	0	2	0
17	(Norway)	FW	Tarik Elyounoussi	2	0	0	0	0	0	2	0
18	(Norway)	MF	Daniel Berntsen	2	0	0	0	1	0	3	0
20	(Norway)	MF	Ole Kristian Selnæs	2	0	2	0	0	0	4	0
22	(Norway)	MF	Jonas Svensson	3	0	1	0	0	0	4	0
24	(Norway)	DF	Stefan Strandberg	2	0	0	0	0	0	2	0
42	(United States)	MF	Mix Diskerud	2	0	0	0	0	0	2	0
			TOTALS	45	3	11	0	4	0	60	3
