= 2015 Rosenborg BK season =

Rosenborg
2015 season
- Chairman: Ivar Koteng
- Coach: Kåre Ingebrigtsen
- Stadium: Lerkendal Stadion
- Tippeligaen: 1st
- Norwegian Cup: Winners
- Europa League: Group stage
- Top goalscorer: League: Alexander Søderlund (22); All: Alexander Søderlund (29)
- Highest home attendance: 21 401 vs Molde (27 June)
- Lowest home attendance: 13 779 vs Sarpsborg 08 (2 August)
- Average home league attendance: 18 039 ▲29.6% (1 November)
Home colours	Away colours	Third colours

The 2015 season is Rosenborg's 25th consecutive year in Tippeligaen, their 48th season in the top flight of Norwegian football and first season with Kåre Ingebrigtsen as permanent manager. They will participate in Tippeligaen, the Cup and the 2015–16 UEFA Europa League, entering at the First qualifying round stage.

== Squad ==
Note: Flags indicate national team as defined under FIFA eligibility rules; some limited exceptions apply. Players may hold more than one non-FIFA nationality.

No.	Pos.	Nation	Player
1	GK	NOR	André Hansen
3	DF	SWE	Mikael Dorsin
4	DF	NOR	Tore Reginiussen (captain)
5	DF	ISL	Hólmar Örn Eyjólfsson
7	MF	DEN	Mike Jensen (vice-captain)
8	MF	NOR	Morten Gamst Pedersen
10	FW	ISL	Matthías Vilhjálmsson
11	FW	DEN	Tobias Mikkelsen
12	GK	NOR	Alexander Lund Hansen
14	DF	NOR	Johan Lædre Bjørdal
15	FW	NOR	Alexander Søderlund
16	DF	NOR	Jørgen Skjelvik
18	MF	NOR	Magnus Stamnestrø

No.	Pos.	Nation	Player
19	FW	NOR	Yann-Erik de Lanlay
20	MF	NOR	Ole Kristian Selnæs
21	MF	NOR	Fredrik Midtsjø
22	DF	NOR	Jonas Svensson
23	FW	NOR	Pål André Helland
24	MF	NOR	Anders Konradsen
32	MF	NOR	John Hou Sæter
33	GK	NOR	Julian Faye Lund
34	MF	NOR	Sivert Solli
35	DF	NOR	Erlend Dahl Reitan
36	FW	NOR	Andreas Helmersen
38	DF	NOR	Per Magnus Steiring

== Transfers ==
=== Winter ===
In: Note: Flags indicate national team as defined under FIFA eligibility rules; some limited exceptions apply. Players may hold more than one non-FIFA nationality.

No.	Pos.	Nation	Player
1	GK	NOR	André Hansen (from (Norway) Odds)
17	FW	DEN	Emil Nielsen (from (Denmark) Roskilde)
18	MF	SCO	Liam Henderson (on loan from (Scotland) Celtic)

Out: Note: Flags indicate national team as defined under FIFA eligibility rules; some limited exceptions apply. Players may hold more than one non-FIFA nationality.

No.	Pos.	Nation	Player
1	GK	SWE	Daniel Örlund (to (Finland) HJK Helsinki)
5	DF	NOR	Per Verner Rønning (on loan to (Norway) Levanger)
18	DF	NOR	Brede Moe (to (Norway) Bodø/Glimt)
18	MF	NOR	Daniel Berntsen (to (Sweden) Djurgården)
31	MF	NOR	Bent Sørmo (on loan to (Norway) Levanger)
34	DF	NOR	Aslak Fonn Witry (on loan to (Norway) Ranheim)
37	FW	NOR	Alexander Sørloth (on loan to (Norway) Bodø/Glimt)
42	MF	USA	Mix Diskerud (to (United States) New York City)

=== Summer ===
In: Note: Flags indicate national team as defined under FIFA eligibility rules; some limited exceptions apply. Players may hold more than one non-FIFA nationality.

No.	Pos.	Nation	Player
10	FW	ISL	Matthías Vilhjálmsson (from (Norway) Start)
14	DF	NOR	Johan Lædre Bjørdal (from (Denmark) AGF Aarhus)
18	MF	NOR	Magnus Stamnestrø (from (Norway) Kristiansund)
19	FW	NOR	Yann-Erik de Lanlay (from (Norway) Viking)
24	MF	NOR	Anders Konradsen (from (France) Stade Rennais)

Out: Note: Flags indicate national team as defined under FIFA eligibility rules; some limited exceptions apply. Players may hold more than one non-FIFA nationality.

No.	Pos.	Nation	Player
5	DF	NOR	Per Verner Rønning (to (Norway) Levanger)
9	FW	FIN	Riku Riski (on loan to (Sweden) Göteborg)
10	FW	SVK	Tomáš Malec (return from loan to (Slovakia) AS Trenčín)
17	FW	DEN	Emil Nielsen (on loan to (Denmark) AGF Aarhus)
18	MF	SCO	Liam Henderson (return from loan from (Scotland) Celtic)
24	DF	NOR	Stefan Strandberg (to (Russia) Krasnodar)
31	MF	NOR	Bent Sørmo (to (Norway) Levanger)

== Competitions ==
=== Tippeligaen ===
==== Results summary ====
Overall								Home						Away					
Pld	W	D	L	GF	GA	GD	Pts	W	D	L	GF	GA	GD	W	D	L	GF	GA	GD
30	21	6	3	73	27	+46	69	11	4	0	36	12	+24	10	2	3	37	15	+22

Last updated: 8 November 2015.
Source: see below

==== Results by round ====
Round	1	2	3	4	5	6	7	8	9	10	11	12	13	14	15	16	17	18	19	20	21	22	23	24	25	26	27	28	29	30
Ground	H	A	H	A	H	A	H	A	H	A	H	A	A	H	A	H	A	H	A	H	H	A	H	A	H	A	H	A	H	A
Result	W	W	D	W	W	W	W	L	W	W	D	W	W	D	L	W	W	W	W	W	W	D	W	L	W	W	D	D	W	W
Position	1	1	3	1	1	1	1	1	1	1	1	1	1	1	1	1	1	1	1	1	1	1	1	1	1	1	1	1	1	1

Updated to match(es) played on 8 November 2015. Source: see below
A = Away; H = Home; W = Win; D = Draw; L = Loss

==== Results ====
6 April 2015 1	Rosenborg	5–0	Aalesund	Trondheim
18:00 CEST (UTC+2)	Helland 1', 15', (penalty missed); Søderlund 42', 71'; Svensson (yellow card) 60'; Malec 85'	Summary	Mattila (yellow card) 20'; Barrantes (yellow card) 67'	Stadium: Lerkendal Station; Attendance: 19 872; Referee: Svein Oddvar Moen (Haugar)

12 April 2015 2	Haugesund	0–6	Rosenborg	Haugesund
18:00 CEST (UTC+2)	Christensen (yellow card) 30'	Summary	Søderlund 18', 58'; Mikkelsen 28'; Malec 80'; Skjelvik 86'	Stadium: Haugesund Stadion; Attendance: 5 761; Referee: Tommy Skjerven (Kaupanger)

18 April 2015 3	Rosenborg	1–1	Strømsgodset	Trondheim
18:00 CEST (UTC+2)	Mikkelsen 6'; Selnæs (yellow card) 90+3'	Summary	Ovendstad (yellow card) 23'; Hamoud (yellow card) 30'; Kovács 79', (yellow card) 90+4'	Stadium: Lerkendal Stadion; Attendance: 19 869; Referee: Ken Henry Johnsen (Flint)

25 April 2015 4	Viking	1–4	Rosenborg	Stavanger
18:00 CEST (UTC+2)	Adegbenro (yellow card) 69'; Abdullahi 77'	Summary	Søderlund 32'; Eyjólfsson (yellow card) 40'; Stranberg (yellow card) 57'; Henderson 82', 86'	Stadium: Viking Stadion; Attendance: 8 769; Referee: Tom Harald Hagen (Grue

30 April 2015 5	Rosenborg	3–2	Start	Trondheim
20:00 CEST (UTC+2)	Dorsin (yellow card) 35'; Søderlund 57', 74'; Henderson 86'	Summary	Børufsen 4'; Vikstøl (yellow card) 23'; Kristjánsson (yellow card) 24'; Sandnes (yellow card) 48' (yellow-red card) 62'; Ajer 90+3'	Stadium: Lerkendal Stadion; Attendance: 14 134; Referee: Svein-Erik Edvartsen (Hamar)

3 May 2015 6	Odd	1–2	Rosenborg	Skien
20:00 CEST (UTC+2)	Bentley 27'; Ruud (penalty missed)	Summary	Helland 10'; Riski 82' (pen.); Eyjólfsson (yellow card) 90'	Stadium: Skagerak Arena; Attendance: 9 073; Referee: Svein Oddvar Moen (Haugar)

9 May 2015 7	Rosenborg	3–0	Lillestrøm	Trondheim
18:00 CEST (UTC+2)	Søderlund 13', 20'; Helland 34'	Summary	Kolstad (yellow card) 57'; Riise (yellow card) 66'; Krogstad (yellow card) 75'; Margeirsson (yellow card) 82'; Innocent (yellow card) 90+4'	Stadium: Lerkendal Stadion; Attendance: 16 757; Referee: Tore Hansen (Feda)

12 May 2015 8	Mjøndalen	3–2	Rosenborg	Mjøndalen
18:00 CEST (UTC+2)	Hansen 36'; Bernstein 43', 90+1'; Gundersen (yellow card) 54'; Stilson (yellow card) 90+3'	Summary	Helland 21'; Mikkelsen 22'	Stadium: Isachsen Stadion; Attendance: 3 246; Referee: Trond Ivar Døvle (Fjellhamar)

16 May 2015 9	Rosenborg	5–1	Sandefjord	Trondheim
18:00 CEST (UTC+2)	Søderlund 3'; Selnæs (yellow card) 20'; Mikkelsen 35', 60'; Midtsjø 67'; Dorsin 90+1'	Summary	Mjelde 14'; Dieng (yellow card) 90+2'	Stadium: Lerkendal Stadion; Attendance: 21 266; Referee: Tom Harald Hagen (Grue)

25 May 2015 10	Stabæk	2–3	Rosenborg	Bærum
18:00 CEST (UTC+2)	Diomande 6', (yellow card) 43'; Dorsin 15' (o.g.)	Summary	Helland 39' (pen.), (yellow card) 66' (yellow-red card) 73'; Søderlund 41', 63', (yellow card) 82'	Stadium: Nadderud Stadion; Attendance: 4 938; Referee: Svein Oddvar Moen (Haugar)

31 May 2015 11	Rosenborg	1–1	Tromsø	Trondheim
20:00 CEST (UTC+2)	Jensen 48'; Eyjólfsson (yellow card) 58'	Summary	Antonsen (yellow card) 27'; Norbye (yellow card) 37'; Andersen 56'; Åsen (yellow card) 90+2'	Stadium: Lerkendal Stadion; Attendance: 14 373; Referee: Ola Hobber Nilsen (Nordstrand)

6 June 2015 12	Vålerenga	1–2	Rosenborg	Oslo
15:30 CEST (UTC+2)	Nilsen (yellow card) 56'; Brown 66'; Stengel (yellow card) 79'; Ómarsson (yellow card) 86'	Summary	Helland 50', 54', (yellow card) 65'	Stadium: Ullevaal Stadion; Attendance: 20 958; Referee: Tom Harald Hagen (Grue)

21 June 2015 13	Sarpsborg 08	0–2	Rosenborg	Sarpsborg
20:00 CEST (UTC+2)	Ernemann (yellow card) 72'	Summary	Eyjólfsson (yellow card) 27'; Helland 40'; Jensen (yellow card) 43', (goal) 66'; Selnæs (yellow card) 45'	Stadium: Sarpsborg Stadion; Attendance: 4 900; Referee: Svein-Erik Edvartsen (Hamar)

28 June 2015 14	Rosenborg	1–1	Molde	Trondheim
18:00 CEST (UTC+2)	Søderlund 32'; Skjelvik (yellow card) 63'	Summary	Hansen 34' (o.g.); Forren (yellow card) 50'; Høiland (yellow card) 90'	Stadium: Lerkendal Stadion; Attendance: 21 401; Referee: Tore Hansen (Feda)

5 July 2015 15	Bodø/Glimt	1–0	Rosenborg	Bodø
20:00 CEST (UTC+2)	Olsen 2', (yellow card) 90+4'; Chatto (yellow card) 13'; Londak (yellow card) 90+2'	Summary	Søderlund (yellow card) 45+1'	Stadium: Aspmyra Stadion; Attendance: 3 960; Referee: Svein-Erik Edvartsen (Hamar)

12 July 2015 16	Rosenborg	3–0	Odd	Trondheim
18:00 CEST (UTC+2)	Selnæs 41'; Helland 50'; Eyjólfsson (yellow card) 56'; Søderlund 71'; Riski (yellow card) 72'	Summary	Nordkvelle (yellow card) 1'; Jensen (yellow card) 74'	Stadium: Lerkendal Stadion; Attendance: 15 773; Referee: Ola Hobber Nilsen (Nordstand)

26 July 2015 17	Sandefjord	1–2	Rosenborg	Sandefjord
20:00 CEST (UTC+2)	Kirkevold 62', (yellow card) 86'; Juel-Nielsen (yellow card) 78'; Larsen (yellow card) 84'; Bindia (yellow card) 88'	Summary	Mikkelsen 5'; Søderlund 10'; Midtsjø (yellow card) 88'	Stadium: Komplett.no Arena; Attendance: 5 731; Referee: Anders Johansen (Brevik)

2 August 2015 18	Rosenborg	3–2	Sarpsborg 08	Trondheim
20:00 CEST (UTC+2)	Midtsjø 51', (yellow card) 53'; Helland 59'; Søderlund 84'	Summary	Tokstad (yellow card) 43'; Mortensen 44'; Ernemann 65'; Askar (yellow card) 67'	Stadium: Lerkendal Stadion; Attendance: 13 779; Referee: Trond Ivar Døvle (Fjellhamar)

9 August 2015 19	Lillestrøm	0–5	Rosenborg	Kjeller
18:00 CEST (UTC+2)	Innocent (yellow card) 27'; Martin (yellow card) 32'; Friday (penalty missed); Mikalsen (red card) 81'	Summary	Helland 39'; Bjørdal 44', 74'; Søderlund 78' (pen.), 82' (pen.)	Stadium: Åråsen Stadion; Attendance: 8 406; Referee: Svein-Erik Edvartsen (Hamar)

16 August 2015 20	Rosenborg	2–0	Vålerenga	Trondheim
18:00 CEST (UTC+2)	Søderlund 54'; Eyjólfsson 76'	Summary	Lundström (yellow card) 40' (yellow-red card) 51'	Stadium: Lerkendal Stadion; Attendance: 20 768; Referee: Tore Hansen (Feda)

23 August 2015 21	Rosenborg	1–0	Mjøndalen	Trondheim
20:00 CEST (UTC+2)	Vilhjálmsson 62'	Summary	Olsen (yellow card) 21'	Stadium: Lerkendal Stadion; Attendance: 16 660; Referee: Tom Harald Hagen (Grue IL)

30 August 2015 22	Tromsø	1–1	Rosenborg	Tromsø
20:00 CEST (UTC+2)	Andersen 3'; Hansson (yellow card) 43'; Johansen (yellow card) 81'; Norbye (yellow card) 84'	Summary	Søderlund 45+1', (yellow card) 65'; Helland (penalty missed)	Stadium: Alfheim Stadion; Attendance: 4 507; Referee: Martin Lundby (Janus)

13 September 2015 23	Rosenborg	1–0	Stabæk	Trondheim
18:00 CEST (UTC+2)	Midtsjø (yellow card) 76'; Selnæs (yellow card) 88'; Konradsen 90+3'	Summary	Keita (yellow card) 45'; Jalasto (yellow card) 55'; Grossman (yellow card) 75'	Stadium: Lerkendal Stadion; Attendance: 19 981; Referee: Svein-Erik Edvartsen (Hamar)

20 September 2015 24	Molde	1–0	Rosenborg	Molde
18:00 CEST (UTC+2)	Kamara 58'; Høiland (yellow card) 86'	Summary	Jensen (yellow card) 3'; Svensson (yellow card) 70'	Stadium: Aker Stadion; Attendance: 11 113; Referee: Svein Oddvar Moen (Haugar)

27 September 2015 25	Rosenborg	2–0	Viking	Trondheim
18:00 CEST (UTC+2)	Midtsjø (yellow card) 38' de Lanlay 45+4'; Søderlund 67'	Summary	Thioune (yellow card) 39'; Nisja (yellow card) 56'; Sverrisson (yellow card) 65'	Stadium: Lerkendal Stadion; Attendance: 14 611; Referee: Anders Johansen (Brevik)

4 October 2015 26	Start	0–4	Rosenborg	Kristiansand
20:00 CEST (UTC+2)	Salvesen (yellow card) 86'	Summary	Konradsen 6'; Helland 26' (pen.); Midtsjø 45'; Skjelvik 47'	Stadium: Sør Arena; Attendance: 5 386; Referee: Trond Ivar Døvle (Fjellhamar)

18 October 2015 27	Rosenborg	1–1	Bodø/Glimt	Trondheim
18:00 CEST (UTC+2)	Selnæs (yellow card) 48'; Søderlund 78'	Summary	Chatto (yellow card) 45'; Olsen 54'; Furebotn (yellow card) 58'	Stadium: Lerkendal Stadion; Attendance: 20 600; Referee: Ola Hobber Nilsen (Nordstrand)

25 October 2015 28	Strømsgodset	3–3	Rosenborg	Drammen
18:00 CEST (UTC+2)	Pedersen (yellow card) 12', (goal) 15', 37'; Adjei-Boateng 22'; Abu (yellow card) 27'; Madsen (yellow card) 42'; Jradi (yellow card) 90'	Summary	Konradsen 8', 50'; Mikkelsen (yellow card) 36' de Lanlay 59'	Stadium: Marienlyst Stadion; Attendance: 8 468; Referee: Tore Hansen (Feda)

1 November 2015 29	Rosenborg	4–3	Haugesund	Trondheim
18:00 CET (UTC+1)	de Lanlay 20'; Mikkelsen 64'; Selnæs 66'; Vilhjálmsson 83'	Summary	Gytkjær 14' (pen.); Andreassen 53'; Haraldseid (yellow card) 62'; Haukås 69'	Stadium: Lerkendal Stadion; Attendance: 20,745; Referee: Kai Erik Steen

8 November 2015 30	Aalesund	0–1	Rosenborg	Ålesund
18:00 CET (UTC+1)	Þrándarson (yellow card) 61'; Matland (yellow card) 66'; Riise (yellow card) 90+2'	Summary	Jensen (yellow card) 72' (goal) 90+3' (pen.)	Stadium: Color Line Stadion; Attendance: 8,287; Referee: Ola Hobber Nilsen

==== Table ====
Pos	Team	Pld	W	D	L	GF	GA	GD	Pts	Qualification or relegation
1	Rosenborg (C)	30	21	6	3	73	27	+46	69	Qualification for the Champions League second qualifying round (Note: Rosenborg qualified for the Europa League second qualifying round by winning the 2015 Norwegian Cup. However, since they already qualified for European competition based on their league position, the spot awarded to the cup winners was passed down the league.)
2	Strømsgodset	30	17	6	7	67	44	+23	57	Qualification for the Europa League second qualifying round
3	Stabæk	30	17	5	8	54	43	+11	56	Qualification for the Europa League first qualifying round
4	Odd	30	15	10	5	61	41	+20	55	Qualification for the Europa League first qualifying round
5	Viking	30	17	2	11	53	39	+14	53	

Source: Football Association of Norway (in Norwegian), Soccerway
Rules for classification: 1) Points; 2) Goal difference; 3) Goals scored; 4) Head-to-head points; 5) Head-to-head goal difference; 6) Head-to-head away goals scored (between two teams).
(C) Champions

=== Norwegian Cup ===
22 April 2015 First Round	Vuku	0–3	Rosenborg	Verdal
17:45 CEST (UTC+2)	McKellar (yellow card) 41'; Hilmarsen (yellow card) 90+3'	Summary	Henderson 9'; Malec 12' (pen.); Nielsen 47'	Stadium: Elman stadion Attendance: 1 325; Referee: Thomas Solum Lystad

6 May 2015 Second Round	Fløya	0–6	Rosenborg	Tromsø
18:00 CEST (UTC+2)	Berthung (yellow card) 25'	Summary	Nielsen 11'; Midtsjø 21'; Riski 31'; Malec 38', 56', 58' (pen.)	Stadium: Fløyabanen; Attendance: 1 102; Referee: Adrian Gjendemsjø

3 June 2015 Third Round	Levanger	0–7	Rosenborg	Levanger
18:00 CEST (UTC+2)		Summary	Nielsen 4'; Helland 9', 61', 82' (pen.); Malec 15', 19', 76' (pen.)	Stadium: Moan gress Attendance: 2 116; Referee: Anders Johansen

24 June 2015 Fourth Round	Rosenborg	7–1	Tromsdalen	Trondheim
18:00 CEST (UTC+2)	Malec 3', 70'; Riski 6'; Jensen 38'; Helland 68', 86'; Pedersen 77' (o.g.)	Summary	Lysvoll (yellow card) 14'; Ahamed 51'	Stadium: Lerkendal Stadion; Attendance: 4 641; Referee: Trygve Kjensli (Nesodden)

13 August 2015 Quarter-finals	Rosenborg	4–0	Mjøndalen	Trondheim
19:35 CEST (UTC+2)	Søderlund 16' de Lanlay 28'; Vilhjálmsson 34'; Helland 59'	Summary	Hansen (yellow card) 47'	Stadium: Lerkendal Stadion; Attendance: 7 736; Referee: Ola Hobber Nilsen (Nordstrand)

23 September 2015 Semi finals	Rosenborg	3–2	Stabæk	Trondheim
20:00 CEST (UTC+2)	Helland 7'; Søderlund 78' (pen.); Selnæs (yellow card) 79'; Vilhjálmsson 95'	Summary	Annan (yellow card) 15'; Keita 52', (yellow card) 90+1'; Jalasto (yellow card) 59'; Næss 70' (pen.); Issah (yellow card) 109'	Stadium: Lerkendal Stadion; Attendance: 9 932; Referee: Tom Harald Hagen (Grue)

==== Final ====
22 November 2015	Rosenborg	2–0	Sarpsborg 08	Oslo
13:15 CET (UTC+1)	Helland 22'; Søderlund (yellow card) 24'; Jensen 40'; Skjelvik (yellow card) 45'; Midtsjø (yellow card) 45'	Summary	Hansen (yellow card) 14'; Askar (yellow card) 55'	Stadium: Ullevaal Stadion; Attendance: 26,507; Referee: Ken Henry Johnsen

=== Europa League ===
==== Qualifying phase ====
2 July 2015 1st qualifying round 1st leg	Víkingur (Faroe Islands)	0–2	(Norway) Rosenborg	Toftir, Faroe Islands
20:00 WEST (UTC+1)	Djurhuus (yellow card) 49'; Olsen (yellow card) 54'	Summary	Selnæs (yellow card) 63'; Mikkelsen (yellow card) 73'; Søderlund 81', 90+2'	Stadium: Svangaskarð; Attendance: 1 057; Referee: Bryn Markham-Jones (Wales)

9 July 2015 1st qualifying round 2nd leg	Rosenborg (Norway)	0–0 (2–0 agg.)	(Faroe Islands) Víkingur	Trondheim
19:00 CEST (UTC+2)	Riski (yellow card) 40'; Malec (yellow card) 41'; Selnæs (yellow card) 54'; Nielsen (yellow card) 70'; Søderlund (yellow card) 88'	Summary	Djurhuus (yellow card) 28'; Đorđević (yellow card) 55'; Hansen (yellow card) 64'	Stadium: Lerkendal Stadion; Attendance: 4 572; Referee: Sergejus Slyva (Lithuania)

16 July 2015 2nd qualifying round 1st leg	KR (Iceland)	0–1	(Norway) Rosenborg	Reykjavík, Iceland
WEST (UTC+1)	Christiansen (yellow card) 55'; Hauksson (yellow card) 60'	Summary	Helland 56' (pen.); Riski (yellow card) 83'; Jensen (yellow card) 83'	Stadium: Frostaskjól; Attendance: 1 540; Referee: Ádám Farkas (Hungary)

23 July 2015 2nd qualifying round 2nd leg	Rosenborg (Norway)	3–0 (4–0 agg.)	(Iceland) KR	Trondheim
19:00 CEST (UTC+2)	Midtsjø 4'; Helland 7'; Søderlund 17'; Svensson (yellow card) 65'	Summary	Gunnarsson (yellow card) 16'; Pálmason (yellow card) 59'	Stadium: Lerkendal Stadion; Attendance: 6 371; Referee: Athanasios Giachos (Greece)

30 July 2015 3rd qualifying round 1st leg	Debrecen (Hungary)	2–3	(Norway) Rosenborg	Debrecen, Hungary
20:00 CEST (UTC+2)	Balogh 33'; Varga (yellow card) 49'; Brković (yellow card) 57'; Bódi 90'	Summary	Helland (yellow card) 45', (goal) 58'; Mikkelsen 52', 87'	Stadium: Nagyerdei Stadion; Attendance: 10 532; Referee: Neil Doyle (Ireland)

6 August 2015 3rd qualifying round 2nd leg	Rosenborg (Norway)	3–1 (6–3 agg.)	(Hungary) Debrecen	Trondheim
19:00 CEST (UTC+2)	Søderlund 27'; Jensen 39'; Vilhjálmsson 86'	Summary	Castillion 43'; Máté (yellow card) 45+1' (yellow-red card) 48'; Bódi (yellow card) 90+2'	Stadium: Lerkendal Stadion; Attendance: 12 919; Referee: Clayton Pisani (Malta)

20 August 2015 Play-off 1st leg	Steaua București (Romania)	0–3	(Norway) Rosenborg	Bucharest, Romania
21:00 EEST (UTC+3)	Iancu (yellow card) 90'	Summary	Søderlund (yellow card) 56'; Mikkelsen 61'; Helland 67'; Jensen (yellow card) 71', (goal) 90+3'	Stadium: Arena Națională; Attendance: 29 104; Referee: Luca Banti (Italy)

27 August 2015 Play-off 2nd leg	Rosenborg (Norway)	0–1 (3–1 agg.)	(Romania) Steaua București	Trondheim
20:00 CEST (UTC+2)	Bjørdal (yellow card) 47'; Jensen (yellow card) 50'; Helland (yellow card) 90+3'	Summary	Iancu (yellow card) 13'; Stanciu (yellow card) 23'; Popa 53'; Filip (yellow card) 70'; Chipciu (yellow card) 85'	Stadium: Lerkendal Stadion; Attendance: 14 640; Referee: Bobby Madden (Scotland)

==== Group stage ====
Pos	Team	Pld	W	D	L	GF	GA	GD	Pts	Qualification	LAZ	SET	DNI	ROS
1	(Italy) Lazio	6	4	2	0	13	6	+7	14	Advance to knockout phase	—	3–2	3–1	3–1
2	(France) Saint-Étienne	6	2	3	1	10	7	+3	9	Advance to knockout phase	1–1	—	3–0	2–2
3	(Ukraine) Dnipro Dnipropetrovsk	6	2	1	3	6	8	−2	7		1–1	0–1	—	3–0
4	(Norway) Rosenborg	6	0	2	4	4	12	−8	2		0–2	1–1	0–1	—

Source: Soccerway
Rules for classification: Group stage tiebreakers

17 September 2015 1	Saint-Étienne (France)	2–2	(Norway) Rosenborg	Saint Étienne, France
21:05 CEST (UTC+2)	Berić 4'; Clément (yellow card) 51'; Eysseric (yellow card) 61'; Sall (yellow card) 84'; Roux 87' (pen.)	Report	Mikkelsen 16'; Skjelvik (yellow card) 28'; Svensson (yellow card) 29', (goal) 79'; Midtsjø (yellow card) 56'	Stadium: Stade Geoffroy-Guichard; Attendance: 22,826; Referee: Christian Dingert (Germany)

1 October 2015 2	Rosenborg (Norway)	0–1	(Ukraine) Dnipro	Trondheim
19:00 CEST (UTC+2)		Report	Seleznyov 79'; Rotan (yellow card) 90+3'	Stadium: Lerkendal Stadion; Attendance: 13,939; Referee: Sébastien Delferière (Belgium)

22 October 2015 3	Lazio (Italy)	3–1	(Norway) Rosenborg	Rome, Italy
19:00 CEST (UTC+2)	Maurício (red card) 6'; Matri 28'; Anderson 54'; Candreva (penalty missed) , 80'; Milinković-Savić (yellow card) 84'; Matri (yellow card) 90'	Report	Bjørdal (yellow card) 62'; Søderlund 69', (penalty missed)	Stadium: Stadio Olimpico; Attendance: 8,630; Referee: Paweł Gil (Poland)

5 November 2015 4	Rosenborg (Norway)	0–2	(Italy) Lazio	Trondheim
21:05 CET (UTC+1)		Report	Đorđević 9', 29'	Stadium: Lerkendal Stadion; Attendance: 16,038; Referee: Andre Marriner (England)

26 November 2015 5	Rosenborg (Norway)	1–1	(France) Saint-Étienne	Trondheim
19:00 CET (UTC+1)	Søderlund 40'	Report	Roux 80' (pen.)	Stadium: Lerkendal Stadion; Attendance: 15,038; Referee: Vitali Meshkov (Russia)

10 December 2015 6	Dnipro (Ukraine)	3–0	(Norway) Rosenborg	Kyiv, Ukraine
21:05 CET (UTC+1)	Matheus 35', 60'; Shakhov 79'	Report		Stadium: Olympic Stadium; Attendance: 4,541; Referee: Stephan Klossner (Switzerland)

=== Copa del Sol ===
==== Group stage ====
12 March 2015	Rosenborg	1–0	Haugesund	La Manga, Spain
18:00 UTC (UTC+1)	Strandberg 39'	Summary	Gytkjær (yellow card) 57'; Cvetinović (yellow card) 65'; Diedhiou (yellow card) 89'

16 March 2015	Rosenborg	4–0	Stabæk	La Manga, Spain
18:00 UTC (UTC+1)	Helland 25', 38' (pen.); Nielsen 84'; Selnæs 87'	Summary		Attendance: 150

=== Club Friendlies ===
7 February 2015	Rosenborg	6–0	Levanger	Malvik
15:00 UTC (UTC+1)	Helmersen 38'; Helland 60', 68', 73', 90+5'; Malec 90'	Summary		Stadium: Abrahallen; Attendance: 700

12 February 2015	Bodø/Glimt	2–1	Rosenborg	Bodø
18:00 UTC (UTC+1)	Sørloth 73'; Eyjólfsson 81' (o.g.); Konradsen (yellow card) 84'	Summary	Skjelvik 41'	Stadium: Nordlandshallen; Attendance: 1 345; Referee: Tom Harald Hagen (Grue IL)

21 February 2015	Rosenborg (Norway)	3–1	(Sweden) Sundsvall	Malvik
15:00 UTC (UTC+1)	Eyjólfsson 59'; Helland 76' (pen.); Riski 84'	Summary	Sellin 73'	Stadium: Abrahallen; Attendance: 500

28 February 2015	Rosenborg (Norway)	8–0	(Sweden) Östersund	Malvik
15:00 UTC (UTC+1)	Sæter 10', 83'; Jensen 14'; Selnæs 31'; Nielsen 39'; Malec 85'; Rønning 87'; Riski 89'	Summary		Stadium: Abrahallen; Attendance: 400

5 March 2015	Rosenborg	5–0	Ranheim	Malvik
18:00 UTC (UTC+1)	Malec 37'; Gamst Pedersen 46'; Helland 55' (pen.), 68'; Riski 72'	Summary		Stadium: Abrahellen; Attendance: 460

22 March 2015	Viking	4–2	Rosenborg	Stavanger
18:00 UTC (UTC+1)	Nisja 12' de Lanlay 16'; Adegbenro 32'; Berisha 61'; Sverrisson (yellow card) 84'	Summary	Helland 36' (pen.); Rønning 83'; Selnæs (yellow card) 84'; Jensen (yellow card) 89'	Stadium: Viking Stadion

27 March 2015	Rosenborg	3–1	Kristiansund	Malvik
16:00 UTC (UTC+1)	Malec 31' (pen.); Reitan 60'; Helland 80'	Summary	Stamnestrø 48'	Stadium: Abrahallen; Attendance: 300

8 September 2015	Levanger	3–3	Rosenborg	Levanger
18:30 UTC (UTC+1)	Bye 28'; Rønning 72', (yellow card) 84'; Flatgård 86'	Summary	Erlien 30', 33'; Stamnestrø 43'	Stadium: Moan Fritidspark; Attendance: 470

== Squad statistics ==
=== Appearances and goals ===
As of match played 22 November 2015

No.	Pos	Nat	Player	Total		Tippeligaen		Norwegian Cup		Europa League	
No.	Pos	Nat	Player	Apps	Goals	Apps	Goals	Apps	Goals	Apps	Goals
1	GK	(Norway) NOR	André Hansen	43	0	28+0	0	5+0	0	10+0	0
3	DF	(Sweden) SWE	Mikael Dorsin	27	1	17+2	1	2+0	0	6+0	0
4	DF	(Norway) NOR	Tore Reginiussen	4	0	1+2	0	0+1	0	0+0	0
5	DF	(Iceland) ISL	Hólmar Örn Eyjólfsson	44	1	24+3	1	6+0	0	11+0	0
7	MF	(Denmark) DEN	Mike Jensen	43	7	27+1	3	5+0	2	9+1	2
8	MF	(Norway) NOR	Morten Gamst Pedersen	5	0	1+3	0	1+0	0	0+0	0
10	FW	(Iceland) ISL	Matthías Vilhjálmsson	18	5	7+4	2	1+1	2	0+5	1
11	FW	(Denmark) DEN	Tobias Mikkelsen	38	12	21+5	8	1+1	0	9+1	4
12	GK	(Norway) NOR	Alexander Lund Hansen	5	0	1+1	0	2+0	0	1+0	0
14	DF	(Norway) NOR	Johan Lædre Bjørdal	19	2	12+0	2	2+0	0	5+0	0
15	FW	(Norway) NOR	Alexander Søderlund	41	28	25+1	22	3+1	2	9+2	4
16	DF	(Norway) NOR	Jørgen Skjelvik	41	2	18+6	2	7+0	0	10+0	0
18	MF	(Norway) NOR	Magnus Stamnestrø	5	0	4+0	0	0+1	0	0+0	0
19	FW	(Norway) NOR	Yann-Erik de Lanlay	19	3	10+1	2	2+1	1	1+4	0
20	MF	(Norway) NOR	Ole Kristian Selnæs	38	2	21+3	2	3+0	0	11+0	0
21	MF	(Norway) NOR	Fredrik Midtsjø	43	6	27+0	4	4+1	1	11+0	1
22	DF	(Norway) NOR	Jonas Svensson	47	1	29+0	0	7+0	0	11+0	1
23	FW	(Norway) NOR	Pål André Helland	35	25	18+3	13	4+2	8	8+0	4
24	MF	(Norway) NOR	Anders Konradsen	15	2	7+1	2	0+2	0	3+2	0
32	MF	(Norway) NOR	John Hou Sæter	9	0	0+3	0	2+2	0	1+1	0
34	MF	(Norway) NOR	Sivert Solli	5	0	0+0	0	0+4	0	0+1	0
36	FW	(Norway) NOR	Andreas Helmersen	6	0	0+0	0	1+2	0	0+3	0
38	DF	(Norway) NOR	Per Magnus Steiring	2	0	0+0	0	0+2	0	0+0	0
Players who appeared for Rosenborg no longer at the club:
9	FW	(Finland) FIN	Riku Riski	23	3	8+8	1	2+0	2	2+3	0
10	FW	(Slovakia) SVK	Tomáš Malec	16	11	0+10	2	4+0	9	2+0	0
17	FW	(Denmark) DEN	Emil Nielsen	11	3	0+5	0	4+0	3	1+1	0
18	MF	(Scotland) SCO	Liam Henderson	13	4	0+9	3	4+0	1	0+0	0
24	DF	(Norway) NOR	Stefan Strandberg	15	0	13+0	0	2+0	0	0+0	0

=== Disciplinary record ===
As of match played 22 November 2015

Number	Nation	Position	Name	Tippeligaen		Norwegian Cup		Europa League		Total	
Number	Nation	Position	Name	Yellow card	Red card	Yellow card	Red card	Yellow card	Red card	Yellow card	Red card
1	(Norway)	GK	André Hansen	0	0	0	0	0	0	0	0
3	(Sweden)	DF	Mikael Dorsin	1	0	0	0	0	0	1	0
4	(Norway)	DF	Tore Reginiussen	0	0	0	0	0	0	0	0
5	(Iceland)	DF	Hólmar Örn Eyjólfsson	4	0	0	0	0	0	4	0
7	(Denmark)	MF	Mike Jensen	3	0	0	0	3	0	6	0
8	(Norway)	MF	Morten Gamst Pedersen	0	0	0	0	0	0	0	0
11	(Denmark)	FW	Tobias Mikkelsen	0	0	0	0	1	0	1	0
12	(Norway)	GK	Alexander Lund Hansen	0	0	0	0	0	0	0	0
14	(Norway)	FW	Johan Lædre Bjørdal	0	0	0	0	2	0	2	0
15	(Norway)	FW	Alexander Søderlund	3	0	1	0	2	0	6	0
16	(Norway)	DF	Jørgen Skjelvik	1	0	1	0	1	0	3	0
18	(Norway)	FW	Magnus Stamnestrø	0	0	0	0	0	0	0	0
19	(Norway)	FW	Yann-Erik de Lanlay	0	0	0	0	0	0	0	0
20	(Norway)	MF	Ole Kristian Selnæs	6	0	1	0	2	0	9	0
21	(Norway)	MF	Fredrik Midtsjø	4	0	1	0	1	0	6	0
22	(Norway)	DF	Jonas Svensson	2	0	0	0	1	0	3	0
23	(Norway)	FW	Pål André Helland	1	1	0	0	2	0	3	1
24	(Norway)	FW	Anders Konradsen	0	0	0	0	0	0	0	0
32	(Norway)	MF	John Hou Sæter	0	0	0	0	0	0	0	0
34	(Norway)	MF	Sivert Solli	0	0	0	0	0	0	0	0
36	(Norway)	FW	Andreas Helmersen	0	0	0	0	0	0	0	0
38	(Norway)	MF	Per Magnus Steiring	0	0	0	0	0	0	0	0
Players who appeared for Rosenborg no longer at the club:
9	(Finland)	FW	Riku Riski	0	0	0	0	2	0	2	0
10	(Slovakia)	FW	Tomáš Malec	0	0	0	0	1	0	1	0
17	(Denmark)	FW	Emil Nielsen	0	0	0	0	1	0	1	0
18	(Scotland)	MF	Liam Henderson	0	0	0	0	0	0	0	0
24	(Norway)	DF	Stefan Strandberg	1	0	0	0	0	0	1	0
			TOTALS	22	1	3	0	20	0	45	1
