= Tarik Elyounoussi =

Norway international footballer (born 1988)

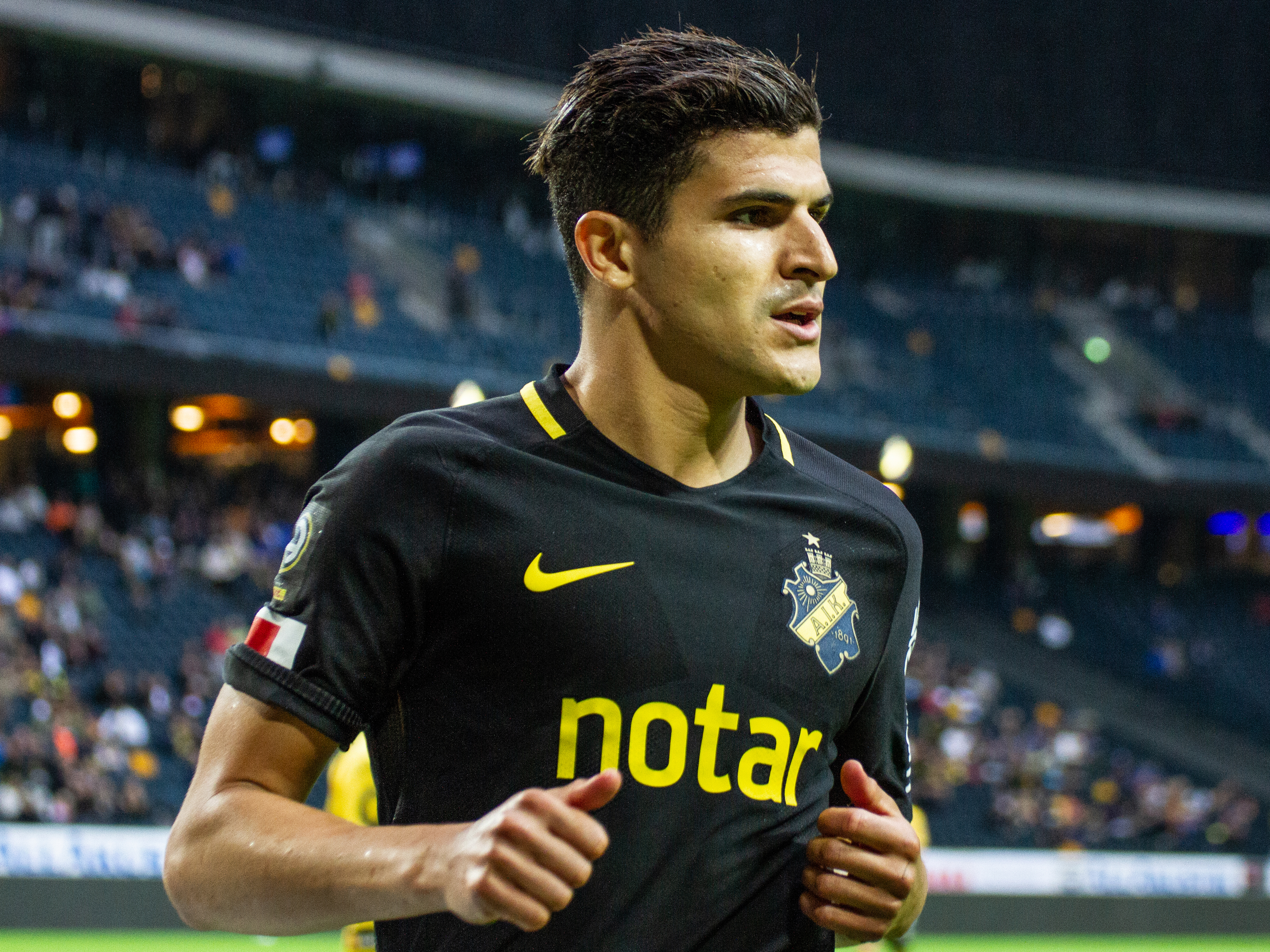
- Elyounoussi with AIK in 2018

Personal information
- Full name: Tarik Elyounoussi
- Date of birth: 23 February 1988 (age 38)
- Place of birth: Al Hoceima, Morocco
- Height: 1.72 m (5 ft 8 in)
- Positions: Forward; winger

Youth career
- 2000–2002: Nylende
- 2003–2005: Trosvik

Senior career*
Years	Team	Apps	(Gls)
2006–2008	Fredrikstad	69	(20)
2008–2011	Heerenveen	31	(2)
2010	→ Lillestrøm (loan)	14	(4)
2011–2012	Fredrikstad	44	(20)
2012–2013	Rosenborg	24	(6)
2013–2016	1899 Hoffenheim	52	(4)
2016–2018	Olympiacos	23	(4)
2017–2018	→ Qarabağ (loan)	8	(0)
2018–2019	AIK	52	(19)
2020–2024	Shonan Bellmare	93	(5)

International career^{‡}
2006–2008	Norway U21	25	(5)
2008–2019	Norway	60	(10)
- * Club domestic league appearances and goals as of 9 December 2023 ‡ National team caps and goals as of 18 November 2019

Tarik Elyounoussi (Arabic: طارق اليونسي, ṭāriq al-yūnusī, pronounced [tˤaːˈrɪq ælˈjuːnusiː]; born 23 February 1988) is a former professional footballer who played as a forward or a winger. Born in Morocco, he represented the Norway national team.

== Club career ==
Born in Al Hoceima, Morocco, Elyounoussi moved to Norway with his family when he was 11 years old. He started playing football in the club Nylende in Fredrikstad, and then joined Trosvik, in which many of the young players in the Fredrikstad youth team have their roots.

He was considered to be a talent Fredrikstad has produced in decades. As such he was awarded the Norwegian Young Player of the Year trophy in 2006 and 2007, after two seasons in the league, and a Norwegian football cup trophy.

=== SC Heerenveen ===
Elyounoussi was sought after by various Premier League clubs in the summer of 2008. However Fredrikstad accepted a bid on around €4 million from French club Le Mans on 8 July. But Elyounoussi had no interest in joining Le Mans. A few weeks later Elyounoussi signed a five-year contract with Heerenveen worth €3.5 million, on 22 July. He joined Heerenveen in August 2008.

He scored in his debut match against FC Volendam. He also netted an important equalizer for Heerenveen in their first round UEFA Cup match away against Vitória F.C., and his second league goal came against NEC Nijmegen.

=== Return to Norway ===
On 19 February 2010, Lillestrøm SK loaned the 21-year-old talented forward until the end of season from SC Heerenveen.

On 7 January 2011, Elyounoussi returned to Fredrikstad FK and Tippeligaen.

Elyounoussi signed for Rosenborg on 9 August 2012, binding him to the club to the end of the 2015 season. Elyounoussi and Mikkel Diskerud's transfers was announced at half time during the UEFA Europa League qualifier against Servette.

=== 1899 Hoffenheim ===
Rosenborg announced on 18 June 2013 that they had sold Elyounoussi to Hoffenheim, and bought Alexander Søderlund from Haugesund as his replacement. Elyounoussi joined the German side after Rosenborg's match against Strømsgodset on 22 June.

=== Olympiacos ===
Olympiacos announced that this club had agreement with TSG Hoffenheim for signing Tarik Elyounoussi on 26 August with the transfer fee estimated to €1 million. On 11 September 2016, he scored his first goal with the club in a hammering 6–1 home win against Veria F.C. He played a vital role in the club, in acquiring the 7th consecutive Super League title.

=== Qarabağ ===
On 31 August 2017, Azerbaijani champions Qarabağ FK signed Elyounoussi on loan until the end of 2017–18 season. The 30-year-old Moroccan-born Norwegian international was a member of Qarabağ during the first half of 2017–18 season, on loan from the Reds, but made only seven official performances in all competitions and failed to impress.

=== AIK ===
On 30 January 2018, Swedish outfit AIK announced the transfer of Elyounoussi from Olympiacos on a two-year deal; details of the fees involved have not been disclosed. In 2018, he won the Swedish league, Allsvenskan, together with AIK.

=== Shonan Bellmare ===
On 12 January 2020, J1 League side Shonan Bellmare announced the transfer of Elyounoussi from AIK on a two-year deal; details of the fees involved were not disclosed. He scored his first goal for the club in a 3–1 defeat to Kawasaki Frontale on 26 July 2020.

He left Shonan at the end of the 2023 season, having scored five goals in 103 appearances for the Japanese club.

== International career ==
Elyounoussi scored on his debut for the national team against Uruguay on 28 May 2008 after only four minutes on the pitch; this was one of the fastest ever debut goal on the national team. He scored his second national team goal on 15 January 2012, in the opening match of 2012 King's Cup against Denmark, which was his fifth cap for Norway.

Elyounoussi was chosen as captain for the international friendlies against South Africa and Zambia in January 2013, and scored the winning goal in the 1–0 victory against South Africa.

== Personal life ==
Elyounoussi was born in Al Hoceima, Morocco and he chose to represent the Norway national team. Elyounoussi is the cousin of Mohamed Elyounoussi, who is also a Norwegian international footballer.

== Career statistics ==
=== Club ===
As of match played 30 September 2023

Appearances and goals by club, season and competition
Club	Season	League			National cup (Note: Includes Norwegian Football Cup, KNVB Cup, DFB-Pokal, Azerbaijan Cup, Svenska Cupen, Emperor's Cup)		League cup (Note: Includes J. League Cup)		Continental		Total	
Club	Season	Division	Apps	Goals	Apps	Goals	Apps	Goals	Apps	Goals	Apps	Goals
Fredrikstad	2005	Tippeligaen	3	0	1	0	—		—		4	0
Fredrikstad	2006	Tippeligaen	25	5	6	4	—		—		31	9
Fredrikstad	2007	Tippeligaen	25	9	2	1	—		—		27	10
Fredrikstad	2008	Tippeligaen	16	6	3	1	—		5	3	24	10
Fredrikstad	Total		69	20	12	6	—		5	3	86	29
Heerenveen	2008–09	Eredivisie	20	2	1	0	—		5 (Note: Appearances in UEFA Cup)	3	26	5
Heerenveen	2009–10	Eredivisie	9	0	2	0	—		2	0	13	0
Heerenveen	2010–11	Eredivisie	2	0	0	0	—		—		2	0
Heerenveen	Total		31	2	3	0	—		7	3	41	5
Lillestrøm (loan)	2010	Tippeligaen	14	4	3	2	—		—		17	6
Fredrikstad	2011	Tippeligaen	28	13	4	2	—		—		32	15
Fredrikstad	2012	Tippeligaen	16	7	2	3	—		—		18	10
Fredrikstad	Total		44	20	6	5	—		—		50	25
Rosenborg	2012	Tippeligaen	11	0	0	0	—		7 (Note: Appearances in UEFA Europa League)	3	18	3
Rosenborg	2013	Tippeligaen	13	6	4	3	—		—		17	9
Rosenborg	Total		24	6	4	3	—		7	3	35	12
1899 Hoffenheim	2013–14	Bundesliga	21	0	4	0	—		—		25	0
1899 Hoffenheim	2014–15	Bundesliga	25	4	1	1	—		—		26	5
1899 Hoffenheim	2015–16	Bundesliga	6	0	1	0	—		—		7	0
1899 Hoffenheim	Total		52	4	6	1	—		—		58	5
Olympiacos	2016–17	Super League Greece	23	4	4	0	—		9	3	36	7
Qarabağ (loan)	2017–18	Azerbaijan Premier League	4	0	1	0	—		3 (Note: Appearances in UEFA Champions League)	0	8	0
AIK	2018	Allsvenskan	25	8	5	3	—		4	0	34	11
AIK	2019	Allsvenskan	27	11	6	5	—		6 (Note: Four appearances and one goal in UEFA Champions League, two appearances in UEFA Europa League)	1	39	16
AIK	Total		52	19	11	7	—		11	1	73	27
Shonan Bellmare	2020	J1 League	20	1	—		2	0	—		22	1
Shonan Bellmare	2021	J1 League	19	2	0	0	0	0	—		19	2
Shonan Bellmare	2022	J1 League	31	1	1	0	5	0	—		37	1
Shonan Bellmare	2023	J1 League	23	1	0	0	2	0	—		25	1
Shonan Bellmare	Total		93	5	1	0	9	0	—		103	5
Career total			406	83	50	24	9	0	41	13	506	120

=== International ===
As of match played 7 June 2019

Appearances and goals by national team and year
National team	Year	Apps	Goals
Norway	2008	3	1
Norway	2009	0	0
Norway	2010	0	0
Norway	2011	1	0
Norway	2012	11	4
Norway	2013	13	2
Norway	2014	9	2
Norway	2015	2	0
Norway	2016	1	0
Norway	2017	6	0
Norway	2018	7	0
Norway	2019	7	1
Total		60	10

Scores and results list Norway's goal tally first, score column indicates score after each Elyounoussi goal.

List of international goals scored by Tarik Elyounoussi
No.	Date	Venue	Opponent	Score	Result	Competition
1	28 May 2008	Ullevaal Stadion, Oslo, Norway	Uruguay	1–1	2–2	Friendly
2	15 January 2012	Rajamangala National Stadium, Bangkok, Thailand	Denmark	1–1	1–1	2012 King's Cup
3	29 February 2012	Windsor Park, Belfast, Northern Ireland	Northern Ireland	2–0	3–0	Friendly
4	2 June 2012	Ullevaal Stadion, Oslo, Norway	Croatia	1–1	1–1	Friendly
5	16 October 2012	Antonis Papadopoulos Stadium, Larnaca, Cyprus	Cyprus	2–1	3–1	2014 FIFA World Cup qualification
6	8 January 2013	Cape Town Stadium, Cape Town, South Africa	South Africa	1–0	1–0	Friendly
7	6 September 2013	Ullevaal Stadion, Oslo, Norway	Cyprus	1–0	2–0	2014 FIFA World Cup qualification
8	5 March 2014	Eden Arena, Prague, Czech Republic	Czech Republic	1–1	2–2	Friendly
9	13 October 2014	Ullevaal Stadion, Oslo, Norway	Bulgaria	1–0	2–1	UEFA Euro 2016 qualification
10	7 June 2019	Ullevaal Stadion, Oslo, Norway	Romania	1–0	2–2	UEFA Euro 2020 qualification

== Honours ==
Fredrikstad

- Norwegian Football Cup: 2006

SC Heerenveen

- KNVB Cup: 2008–09

Olympiacos

- Super League Greece: 2016–17

AIK

- Allsvenskan: 2018

Individual

- Norwegian Young Player of the Year: 2006, 2007
