= Simen Wangberg =

Norwegian footballer (born 1991)

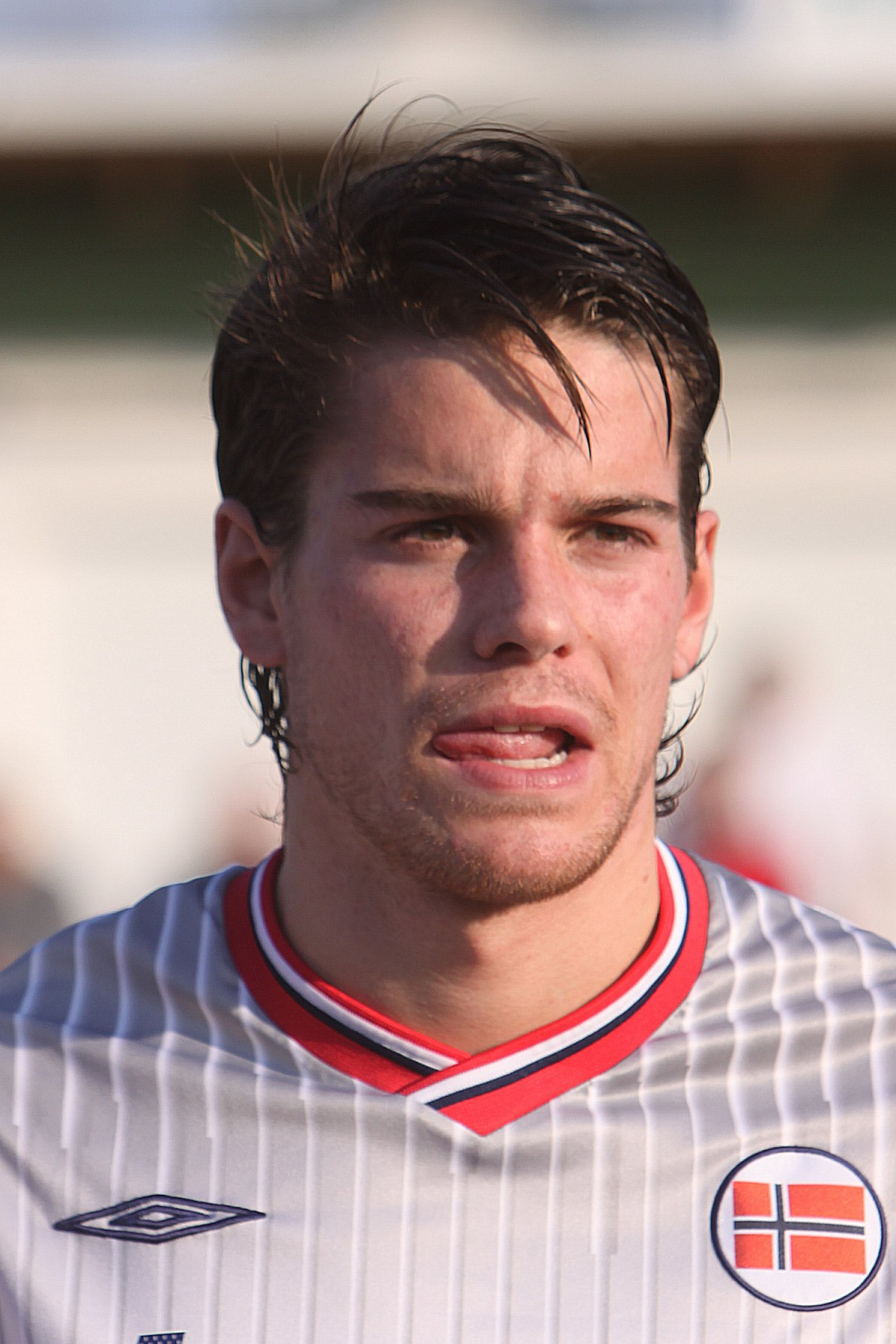
- Simen Wangberg (Rosenborg Trondheim) - Norway national under-21 football team (01)

Personal information
- Full name: Simen Søraunet Wangberg
- Date of birth: 6 May 1991 (age 35)
- Place of birth: Trondheim, Norway
- Height: 1.88 m (6 ft 2 in)
- Position: Defender

Youth career
- –2007: Nidelv
- 2008–2009: Rosenborg 2

Senior career*
Years	Team	Apps	(Gls)
2009–2012	Rosenborg	24	(2)
2011	→ Ranheim (loan)	6	(0)
2012–2014	Brann	19	(1)
2014–2021	Tromsø	187	(14)
2021–2023	Stabæk	67	(7)

International career
2008–2009	Norway U-17	5	(0)
2009	Norway U-19	2	(1)
2011	Norway U-21	6	(1)
2012	Norway U-23	3	(0)
- * Club domestic league appearances and goals

Simen Søraunet Wangberg (born 6 May 1991) is a Norwegian former footballer who played as a defender.

== Club career ==
He came to Rosenborg as a junior player ahead of the 2008-season, from Nidelv. Before the 2009 season he became a member of the first team. He made his Rosenborg debut in a cup tie against Gjøvik in the spring 2009.

On 7 August 2011, he scored Rosenborg's first goal with his hand in the 3–1 win against Molde.

After playing 24 matches and scoring two goals for Rosenborg in Tippeligaen, he moved to Brann in August 2012. Wangberg was brought to Brann as a replacement for Lars Grorud, who had transferred to Fredrikstad.

In February 2014 Wangberg was sold to Tromsø IL, where he has played 200 matches and scored 14 goals.(25.04.2021).

== Career statistics ==
=== Club ===
As of match played 3 September 2023

Appearances and goals by club, season and competition
Club	Season	League			National Cup		Europe		Total	
Club	Season	Division	Apps	Goals	Apps	Goals	Apps	Goals	Apps	Goals
Rosenborg	2009	Tippeligaen	3	0	2	0	-		5	0
Rosenborg	2010	Tippeligaen	3	0	1	0	1	0	5	0
Rosenborg	2011	Tippeligaen	8	2	2	0	5	0	15	2
Rosenborg	2012	Tippeligaen	10	0	4	0	3	0	17	0
Rosenborg	Total		24	2	9	0	9	0	42	2
Ranheim (loan)	2011	Adeccoligaen	6	0	3	0	-		9	0
Ranheim (loan)	Total		6	0	3	0	-	-	9	0
Brann	2012	Tippeligaen	10	1	1	0	-		11	1
Brann	2013	Tippeligaen	9	0	0	0	-		9	0
Brann	Total		19	1	1	0	-	-	20	1
Tromsø	2014	1. divisjon	30	2	3	0	4	3	37	5
Tromsø	2015	Tippeligaen	29	0	0	0	-		29	0
Tromsø	2016	Tippeligaen	26	2	3	0	-		29	2
Tromsø	2017	Eliteserien	27	6	2	0	-		29	6
Tromsø	2018	Eliteserien	25	2	2	0	-		27	2
Tromsø	2019	Eliteserien	24	2	0	0	-		24	2
Tromsø	2020	OBOS-ligaen	26	0	0	0	-		26	0
Tromsø	Total		187	14	7	0	4	3	198	17
Stabæk	2021	Eliteserien	26	3	1	0	-		27	3
Stabæk	2022	OBOS-ligaen	28	2	1	0	-		29	2
Stabæk	2023	Eliteserien	10	1	1	0	-		11	1
Stabæk	Total		64	6	3	0	-	-	67	6
Career total			300	23	23	0	13	3	336	26

== Honours ==
=== Club ===
Rosenborg

- Tippeligaen: 2009, 2010
