= Alexander Søderlund =

Norwegian footballer (born 1987)

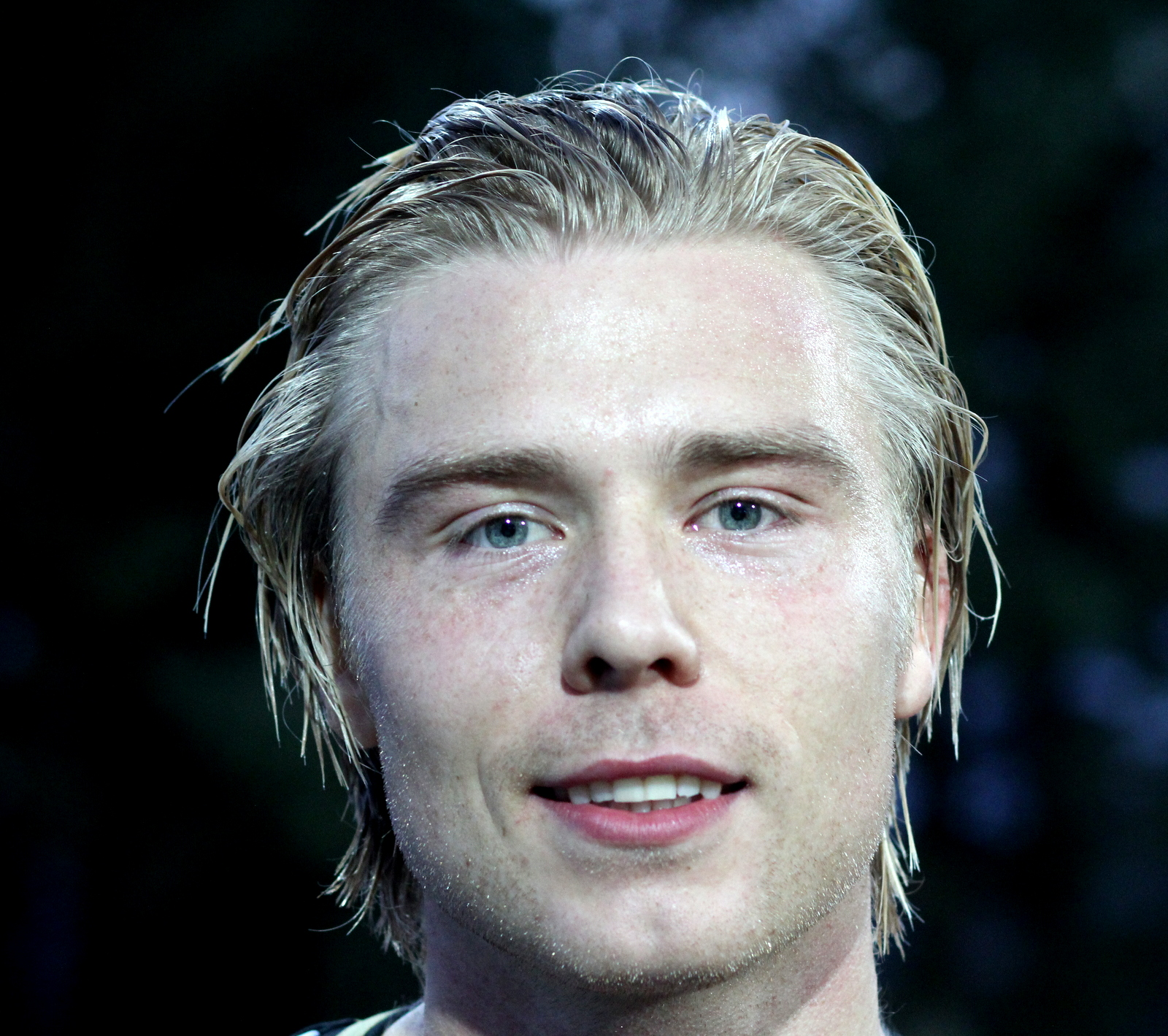
- Søderlund in 2013

Personal information
- Full name: Alexander Toft Søderlund
- Date of birth: 3 August 1987 (age 39)
- Place of birth: Haugesund, Norway
- Height: 1.87 m (6 ft 2 in)
- Position: Forward

Youth career
- Stegaberg

Senior career*
Years	Team	Apps	(Gls)
2005–2006	Haugesund	0	(0)
2006–2008	Vard Haugesund	11	(4)
2008	Virtus Lanciano	0	(0)
2008–2010	Treviso	0	(0)
2008	→ UR Namur (loan)	3	(0)
2009	→ Botev Plovdiv (loan)	0	(0)
2009	→ FH (loan)	18	(3)
2010	Lecco	7	(0)
2010	Vard Haugesund	12	(4)
2011–2013	Haugesund	70	(24)
2013–2015	Rosenborg	63	(38)
2016–2018	Saint-Étienne	43	(3)
2018–2020	Rosenborg	55	(16)
2020	Häcken	23	(8)
2021	Çaykur Rizespor	12	(1)
2021–2023	Haugesund	57	(9)
2024	Vard Haugesund	14	(7)
Total		388	(117)

International career^{‡}
2006	Norway U21	1	(0)
2012–2017	Norway	32	(2)
- * Club domestic league appearances and goals as of 1 January 2025 ‡ National team caps and goals as of 14 November 2017

Alexander Toft Søderlund (born 3 August 1987) is a former Norwegian professional footballer who played as a forward. He has represented the Norway national team.

== Club career ==
After playing for Stegaberg IL in his youth, Søderlund played for Haugesund and Vard Haugesund. He later became something of a journeyman, spending time at six different clubs in four countries between 2008 and 2010 (notably in the third Italian division, fourth Italian division and Belgian Second Division).

His unsuccessful experience abroad ended in summer 2010, when the fourth Italian division club of Calcio Lecco did not renew his probation period of 4 months.

He then returned home, and played for his former club Vard Haugesund (Norwegian Second Division) in the closing stages of the 2010 season.

In January 2011, he moved to FK Haugesund, and on 20 March 2011, Søderlund made his debut in Tippeligaen against Tromsø. He got his first two league goals against Stabæk on 8 May 2011, and finished his debut season with 11 goals.

On 17 June 2013, Rosenborg BK announced that they had bought Søderlund from Haugesund as a replacement for Tarik Elyounoussi who was sold to the German Bundesliga. Søderlund joined the club on 15 July. He played 12 matches and scored three goals for Haugesund in the 2013 season, and as the club eventually finished in third place in Tippeligaen for the first time in the club's history, Søderlund was eligible for bronze medals. But as his new team Rosenborg finished second, he was only awarded silver medals due to a change in the rules after Thomas Holm won both gold and silver with two different teams in the 2011 season. Søderlund won another silver-medal in 2013, as Rosenborg lost the 2013 Norwegian Football Cup Final 4–2 against Molde.

On 4 January 2016, Søderlund joined Saint-Étienne on 3.5-year contract. The transfer fee paid to Rosenborg was estimated at between €1.5 and 2 million. Thirteen days later, he scored his first goal for the club in a 1–0 derby win against Lyon.

Frequently criticized in France for his lack of speed and technique, he was transferred in January 2018 to his former club Rosenborg. The transfer fee paid was estimated at €500,000.

On 13 January 2025, Søderlund announced that he will retire.

== International career ==
On 23 November 2011, Søderlund was named in the Norway squad for the three friendly matches in Thailand in January 2012. He made his debut for Norway in a 1–1 friendly draw against Denmark on 15 January 2012. On 1 June 2012, he was added to Norway's squad when Mohammed Abdellaoue was doubtful for the match against Croatia. Søderlund got his first cap at home when he replaced Erik Huseklepp as a substitute in the 84th minute, and later assisted Tarik Elyounoussi equalizing goal against Croatia. In the 2014 FIFA World Cup qualifying match against Slovenia on 11 September 2012, he replaced Elyounoussi after 89 minutes earning a penalty three minutes later which John Arne Riise converted for the match-winning goal as Norway won 2–1. He started his first qualifying match when Norway met Switzerland on 12 October 2012.

On 14 December 2023 he announced that he retired from international football.

== Career statistics ==
=== Club ===
As of 28 October 2023

Appearances and goals by club, season and competition
Club	Season	League			Cup		Europe		Total	
Club	Season	Division	Apps	Goals	Apps	Goals	Apps	Goals	Apps	Goals
Treviso	2008–09	Serie B	0	0	0	0	—		0	0
Namur (loan)	2008–09	Belgian Second Division	3	0	—		—		3	0
FH (loan)	2009	Úrvalsdeild	18	3	—		2	0	20	3
Lecco	2009–10	Lega Pro	7	0	—		—		7	0
Haugesund	2011	Tippeligaen	29	11	4	4	—		33	15
Haugesund	2012	Tippeligaen	29	10	3	2	—		32	12
Haugesund	2013	Tippeligaen	12	3	—		—		12	3
Haugesund	Total		70	24	7	6	0	0	77	30
Rosenborg	2013	Tippeligaen	13	3	1	1	2	1	16	5
Rosenborg	2014	Tippeligaen	23	13	3	1	5	2	31	16
Rosenborg	2015	Tippeligaen	27	22	4	2	14	6	45	30
Rosenborg	Total		63	38	8	4	21	9	92	51
Saint-Étienne	2015–16	Ligue 1	14	2	1	0	—		15	2
Saint-Étienne	2016–17	Ligue 1	17	1	2	1	4	2	23	4
Saint-Étienne	2017–18	Ligue 1	12	0	1	0	0	0	13	0
Saint-Étienne	Total		43	3	4	1	4	2	51	6
Rosenborg	2018	Eliteserien	27	8	6	5	10	1	43	14
Rosenborg	2019	Eliteserien	28	8	2	0	13	5	43	13
Rosenborg	Total		55	16	8	5	23	6	86	27
Häcken	2020	Allsvenskan	23	8	4	0	0	0	27	8
Çaykur Rizespor	2020–21	Süper Lig	12	1	0	0	—		12	1
Haugesund	2021	Eliteserien	15	4	0	0	—		15	4
Haugesund	2022	Eliteserien	26	4	0	0	—		26	4
Haugesund	2023	Eliteserien	12	2	0	0	—		12	2
Haugesund	Total		53	10	0	0	0	0	53	10
Career total			347	103	31	16	50	17	429	136

=== International goals ===
Scores and results list Norway's goal tally first, score column indicates score after each Søderlund goal.

List of international goals scored by Alexander Søderlund
No.	Date	Venue	Opponent	Score	Result	Competition	Ref.
1	10 October 2015	Ullevaal Stadion, Oslo, Norway	Malta	2–0	2–0	UEFA Euro 2016 qualification	
2	10 June 2017	Ullevaal Stadion, Oslo, Norway	Czech Republic	1–1	1–1	2018 FIFA World Cup qualification	

== Honours ==
Rosenborg

- Eliteserien: 2015, 2018
- Norwegian Cup: 2015, 2018
- Mesterfinalen: 2018

=== Individual ===
- Eliteserien Top goalscorer: 2015
- Eliteserien Striker of the Year: 2015
