= Erik Mellevold Bråthen =

Norwegian footballer (born 1987)

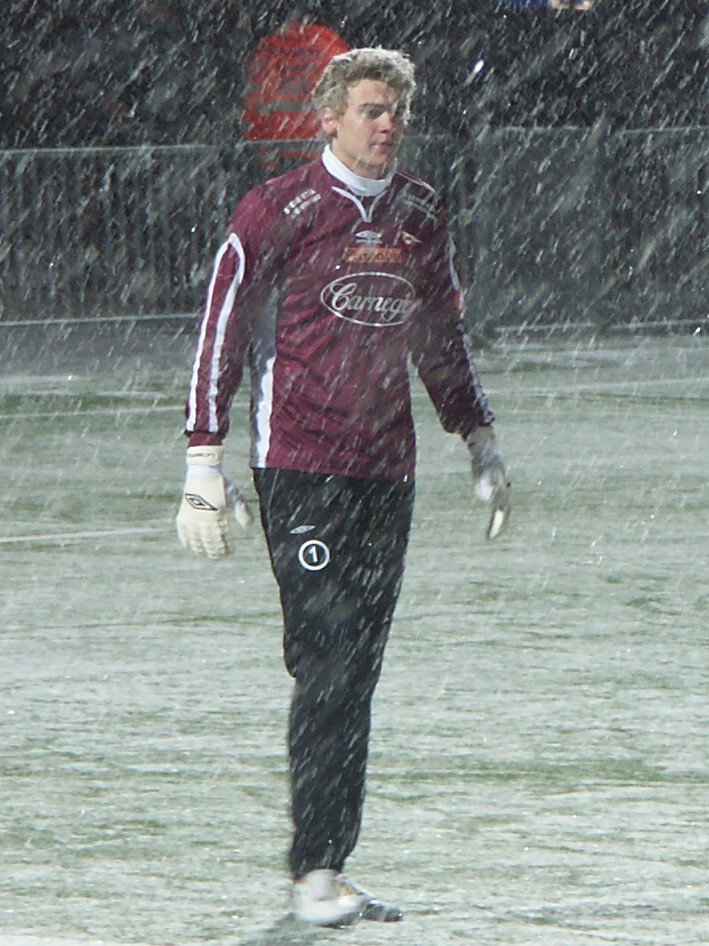

Personal information
- Date of birth: 16 September 1987 (age 39)
- Place of birth: Fredrikstad, Norway
- Height: 1.96 m (6 ft 5 in)
- Position: Goalkeeper

Senior career*
| Years | Team | Apps | (Gls) |
| –2006 | Kvik Halden FK | | |
| 2007–2010 | Fredrikstad FK | 6 | (0) |
| 2010–2013 | Rosenborg BK | 3 | (0) |
- * Club domestic league appearances and goals as of 2 May 2012

Erik Mellevold Bråthen (born 16 September 1987) is a retired Norwegian football goalkeeper.

== Career statistics ==
| Season | Club | Division | League | | Cup | | Total | |
| Season | Club | Division | Apps | Goals | Apps | Goals | Apps | Goals |
|---|---|---|---|---|---|---|---|---|
| 2007 | Fredrikstad | Tippeligaen | 1 | 0 | 1 | 0 | 2 | 0 |
| 2008 | Fredrikstad | Tippeligaen | 0 | 0 | 0 | 0 | 0 | 0 |
| 2009 | Fredrikstad | Tippeligaen | 5 | 0 | 3 | 0 | 8 | 0 |
| 2010 | Rosenborg | Tippeligaen | 0 | 0 | 0 | 0 | 0 | 0 |
| 2011 | Rosenborg | Tippeligaen | 3 | 0 | 2 | 0 | 5 | 0 |
| 2012 | Rosenborg | Tippeligaen | 0 | 0 | 1 | 0 | 1 | 0 |
| 2013 | Rosenborg | Tippeligaen | 0 | 0 | 0 | 0 | 0 | 0 |
| Career Total | | | 9 | 0 | 7 | 0 | 16 | 0 |
