= John Chibuike =

Nigerian footballer

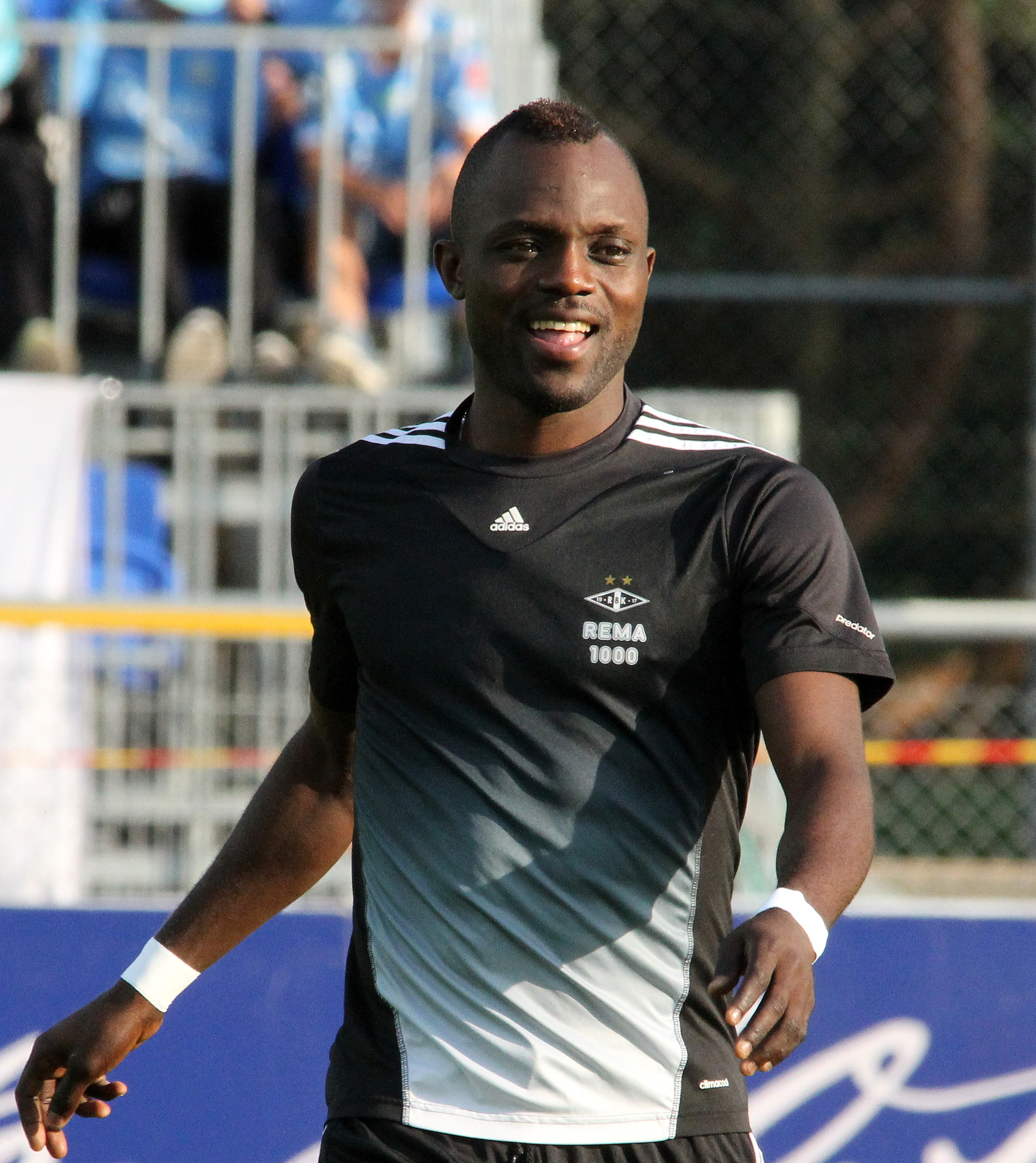
- At Sandnes stadion, 25 August 2013

Personal information
- Date of birth: 10 October 1988 (age 38)
- Place of birth: Enugu, Nigeria
- Height: 1.82 m (5 ft 11 1/2 in)
- Position: Second striker

Youth career
- Enugu Rangers

Senior career*
Years	Team	Apps	(Gls)
2008–2009	Enugu Rangers	14	(5)
2009–2011	BK Häcken	70	(16)
2011–2014	Rosenborg	66	(19)
2014–2016	Gaziantepspor	59	(11)
2016–2017	AIK	7	(0)
2017	Hapoel Tel Aviv	11	(3)
2017–2018	Samsunspor	21	(2)
2018	Irtysh Pavlodar	12	(0)
2019–2020	Falkenbergs FF	43	(6)
- * Club domestic league appearances and goals as of 24 February 2020

John Chibuike (born 10 October 1988) is a Nigerian footballer who played as a secondary striker.

== Career ==
Starting his career in Enugu Rangers and made the senior team in the 2008-2009 season, in 2009 before the start of Allsvenskan he was bought by BK Häcken. Mainly being used as a defender by Rangers, after he arrived in Häcken he has been used more as a midfielder.

John Chibuike had a quite soft start in BK Häcken, but soon spectators around the venues saw that he had something extra. During his first season – 2010 he played as a midfielder and showed both good defensive and offensive skills, especially good vision and technique. He made 27 out of 30 games during the season scoring 3 goals and making three assists.

At the start of the Allsvenskan, season 2011 it became apparent that Chibuike had improved even more. Allsvenskan topscorer – and club fellow Mathias Ranégie said he was the team’s most import important player and that he very soon could see Chibuike playing on a European top-level.

On 29 August 2011, Chibuike signed a four-year contract with Norwegian side Rosenborg where he played behind a main striker.

In the summer of 2014, Chibuike moved from Rosenborg to the Turkish side Gaziantepspor, signing a four-year contract.

In August 2016, Chibuike signed for AIK.

== Career statistics ==
As of 24 November 2016

Season	Club	Division	League		Cup		Europe		Total	
Season	Club	Division	Apps	Goals	Apps	Goals	Apps	Goals	Apps	Goals
Sweden		Division	League		Cup		Europe		Total	
2009	BK Häcken	Allsvenskan	22	6	3	1	—		25	7
2010	BK Häcken	Allsvenskan	27	3	1	1	—		28	4
2011	BK Häcken	Allsvenskan	21	7	1	0	5	1	27	8
Norway		Division	League		Cup		Europe		Total	
2011	Rosenborg	Tippeligaen	11	6	0	0	0	0	11	6
2012	Rosenborg	Tippeligaen	23	4	2	2	8	1	33	7
2013	Rosenborg	Tippeligaen	24	9	5	3	4	3	33	15
2014	Rosenborg	Tippeligaen	8	0	2	4	0	0	10	4
Turkey		Division	League		Cup		Europe		Total	
2014–15	Gaziantepspor	Süper Lig	27	6	5	0	—		33	6
2015–16	Gaziantepspor	Süper Lig	32	5	3	0	—		35	5
Sweden		Division	League		Cup		Europe		Total	
2016	AIK	Allsvenskan	7	0	0	0	—		7	0
Career Total			202	46	22	11	17	5	241	62
