= Daniel Berntsen =

Norwegian footballer (born 1993)

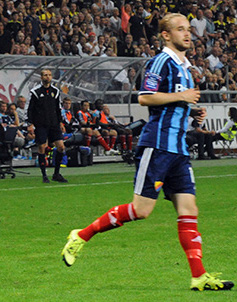
- Berntsen playing for Djurgårdens IF in 2015

Personal information
- Full name: Daniel Mikal Aas Berntsen
- Date of birth: 4 April 1993 (age 33)
- Place of birth: Bodø, Norway
- Height: 1.75 m (5 ft 9 in)
- Positions: Attacking midfielder; winger

Youth career
- –2009: Bodø/Glimt

Senior career*
Years	Team	Apps	(Gls)
2009–2011	Bodø/Glimt	33	(4)
2012–2014	Rosenborg	22	(1)
2012	→ Fredrikstad (loan)	6	(0)
2012	→ Bodø/Glimt (loan)	13	(1)
2014	→ Bodø/Glimt (loan)	10	(0)
2015–2017	Djurgårdens IF	54	(8)
2017	Vålerenga	18	(0)
2018–2021	Tromsø	89	(7)
2022–2024	Junkeren	22	(2)
2024	Bodø/Glimt	0	(0)

International career^{‡}
2011	Norway U18	10	(1)
2011–2012	Norway U19	7	(0)
2013–2014	Norway U21	11	(0)
2013–2015	Norway U23	2	(0)
- * Club domestic league appearances and goals as of 4 April 2024 ‡ National team caps and goals as of 3 January 2015

Daniel Mikal Aas Berntsen (born 4 April 1993) is a Norwegian footballer who plays as an attacking midfielder.

== Club career ==
=== Bodø/Glimt ===
In the summer of 2007, a then 14-year-old Berntsen was selected as Bodø/Glimt's representative to train with the best young footballers in Norway and be coached by the likes of Åge Hareide and Ole Gunnar Solskjær. He joined former Rosenborg teammates, Fredrik Midtsjø and Jonas Svensson. Berntsen first came to real prominence when he helped Bodø/Glimt to win the Norway Cup Klasse B in 2009. Avisa Nordland cited Berntsen as the stand out player in Glimt's win.

On 13 May 2010, just a month after his seventeenth birthday, Berntsen made his senior debut when he was a 63rd minute substitution for Håvard Sakariassen in a Norwegian Cup game against Innstranden. In September 2010, Berntsen signed a professional contract with Glimt. He made his Adeccoligaen debut a week later when he came on for Runar Berg against Sandnes Ulf. The following day, Berg, one of Glimt's most famous players, retired with immediate effect. He explained the decision by stating, "when I saw Daniel Berntsen running down to the byline for the second time and putting a ball across the front of goal, it became very clear to me: I cannot take up a space in the team at the expense of such a talented youngster." Berntsen went on to start four of the last five games in the 2010 season.

In 2011, Berntsen became the second most regular starter for Glimt, starting all but the first three games in the season. His first professional goal was, surprisingly, from a back post header in a 2–1 over Strømmen on 5 June 2011. Berntsen's second goal, though, was one more indicative of his touted ability; after feigning past one defender, his 25-yard curling shot found the top left-hand corner of the goal in Glimt's 4–2 win over Kongsvinger. In mid-August, Berntsen himself confirmed to NRK that Tromsø wanted him to replace Ruben Yttergård Jenssen if the latter were to leave for an unnamed Dutch club. Such a deal would not develop, however, and on 31 August 2011 Berntsen signed for Norwegian giants Rosenborg for 4.5 million kroner. Berntsen stayed with Glimt until the end of the season, scoring a further two goals in the process. His last game, like his debut, came against Sandnes Ulf on 30 October 2011.

=== Rosenborg ===
After signing a four-year deal with Rosenborg, Berntsen admitted that the move "is a dream come true." After being compared to former Glimt and Rosenborg hero Runar Berg, the man he had made able to retire, he said, "it's great to be compared with such a great player. We can only hope that I have some of the same qualities." His first on-field contribution to his new club came on 2 November 2011 when he played in the under-19 side's 4–1 loss to Aston Villa in the 2011–12 NextGen series. He played a part in the return fixture a week later when Rosenborg won 3–2, and one further match against Fenerbahçe.

On 25 April 2012, Berntsen was signed on a one-month loan by Fredrikstad. Although signed outside of the regular transfer window, he was allowed to move as he was still a member of Norwegian youth teams. Berntsen was again loaned out in August 2012, this time to his old club Bodø/Glimt until the end of the 2012 season. Berntsen did not receive much playing time after he returned to Rosenborg. He started his first match in the 3–2 victory against Odd, where he also scored the match-winning goal.

== Career statistics ==
=== Club ===
As of match played 9 April 2024

Appearances and goals by club, season and competition
Club	Season	League			National Cup		Europe		Other		Total	
Club	Season	Division	Apps	Goals	Apps	Goals	Apps	Goals	Apps	Goals	Apps	Goals
Bodø/Glimt	2010	Adeccoligaen	6	0	2	0	-		-		8	0
Bodø/Glimt	2011	Adeccoligaen	27	4	1	0	-		-		28	4
Bodø/Glimt	Total		33	4	3	0	-	-	-	-	36	4
Rosenborg	2012	Tippeligaen	1	0	1	0	1	0	-		3	0
Rosenborg	2013	Tippeligaen	11	1	3	0	4	0	-		18	1
Rosenborg	2014	Tippeligaen	10	0	3	0	4	0	-		17	0
Rosenborg	Total		22	1	7	0	9	0	-	-	38	1
Fredrikstad (loan)	2012	Tippeligaen	6	0	0	0	-		-		6	0
Fredrikstad (loan)	Total		6	0	0	0	-	-	-	-	6	0
Bodø/Glimt (loan)	2012	Adeccoligaen	13	1	1	0	-		-		14	1
Bodø/Glimt (loan)	2014	Tippeligaen	10	0	0	0	-		-		10	0
Bodø/Glimt (loan)	Total		23	1	1	0	-	-	-	-	24	1
Djurgården	2015	Allsvenskan	28	6	3	1	-		-		31	6
Djurgården	2016	Allsvenskan	25	2	4	1	-		-		29	3
Djurgården	Total		53	8	7	2	-	-	-	-	60	10
Vålerenga	2017	Eliteserien	18	0	6	0	-		-		24	0
Vålerenga	Total		18	0	6	0	-	-	-	-	24	0
Tromsø	2018	Eliteserien	28	5	3	1	-		-		31	6
Tromsø	2019	Eliteserien	21	0	1	0	-		-		22	0
Tromsø	2020	OBOS-ligaen	17	2	0	0	-		-		17	2
Tromsø	2021	Eliteserien	23	0	1	0	-		-		24	0
Tromsø	Total		89	7	5	1	-	-	-	-	94	8
Junkeren	2022	Norsk Tipping-ligaen	8	2	2	0	-		-		10	2
Junkeren	2023	PostNord-ligaen	14	0	1	0	-		-		15	0
Junkeren	Total		22	2	3	0	-	-	-	-	25	2
Bodø/Glimt	2024	Eliteserien	0	0	1	0	-		-		1	0
Bodø/Glimt	Total		0	0	1	0	-	-	-	-	1	0
Career total			266	23	33	3	9	0	-	-	308	26
