= Per Verner Rønning =

Norwegian footballer (born 1983)

Personal information
- Full name: Per Verner Vågan Rønning
- Date of birth: 9 January 1983 (age 43)
- Place of birth: Levanger Municipality, Norway
- Height: 1.93 m (6 ft 4 in)
- Position: Centre back

Youth career
- 1989–1990: Skogn
- 1991–1997: Sverre
- 1998: Levanger

Senior career*
Years	Team	Apps	(Gls)
1999–2005	Levanger	140	(20)
2006	Kongsvinger	30	(3)
2007	AIK	3	(0)
2008–2011	Bodø/Glimt	89	(6)
2011–2015	Rosenborg	36	(2)
2015	→ Levanger (loan)	15	(0)
2015–2017	Levanger	49	(1)
2019	Levanger	3	(0)

Managerial career
- 2019: Levanger (assistant)
- 2020–2025: Levanger
- 2025–: Sandefjord (assistant)
- * Club domestic league appearances and goals as of 13 April 2019

Per Verner Vågan Rønning (born 9 January 1983) is a former Norwegian footballer. He has previously played for Kongsvinger, AIK, Bodø/Glimt, Rosenborg and Levanger.

== Career ==
Rønning made his debut for AIK on 17 April against IFK Göteborg as a left wing-back. He gave an assist to goalscorer Miran Burgič who headed in the equalizer in the match. Rønning was injured most of the 2007 season. He only played in three Allsvenskan matches that season.

In January 2008 he transferred from AIK to Bodø/Glimt, and played there until he moved to Rosenborg the summer 2011. At winter 2015 Rønning was loaned back to his former club Levanger for the first half of the season. The move was made permanent in July.

== Career statistics ==
As of 17 January 2020

Season	Club	Division	League		Cup		Europe		Total	
Season	Club	Division	Apps	Goals	Apps	Goals	Apps	Goals	Apps	Goals
2006	Kongsvinger	Adeccoligaen	29	3	1	0	0	0	30	3
2007	AIK	Allsvenskan	3	0	0	0	0	0	3	0
2008	Bodø/Glimt	Tippeligaen	25	1	5	1	0	0	30	2
2009	Bodø/Glimt	Tippeligaen	24	3	3	1	0	0	27	4
2010	Bodø/Glimt	Adeccoligaen	22	1	3	1	0	0	25	2
2011	Bodø/Glimt	Adeccoligaen	18	1	2	0	0	0	20	1
2011	Rosenborg	Tippeligaen	5	0	0	0	2	0	7	0
2012	Rosenborg	Tippeligaen	14	2	3	1	11	0	28	3
2013	Rosenborg	Tippeligaen	13	0	3	0	3	0	19	0
2014	Rosenborg	Tippeligaen	4	0	2	0	2	0	8	0
2015	Levanger	OBOS-ligaen	28	0	2	0	0	0	30	0
2016	Levanger	OBOS-ligaen	22	0	1	0	0	0	23	0
2017	Levanger	OBOS-ligaen	14	1	1	0	0	0	15	1
2019	Levanger	PostNord-ligaen	3	0	0	0	0	0	3	0
Career Total			224	12	26	4	18	0	268	16
