= 2016 Norwegian Football Cup =

Norgesmesterskapet i fotball for herrer

Tournament details
- Country: Norway
- Teams: 272 (overall); 128 (main competition)

Final positions
- Champions: Rosenborg (11th title)
- Runners-up: Kongsvinger

Tournament statistics
- Matches played: 127
- Goals scored: 490 (3.86 per match)
- Top goal scorer(s): Mustafa Abdellaoue; Henrik Kjelsrud Johansen; Kwame Karikari; Thomas Lehne Olsen; Patrick Pedersen (5 goals each)

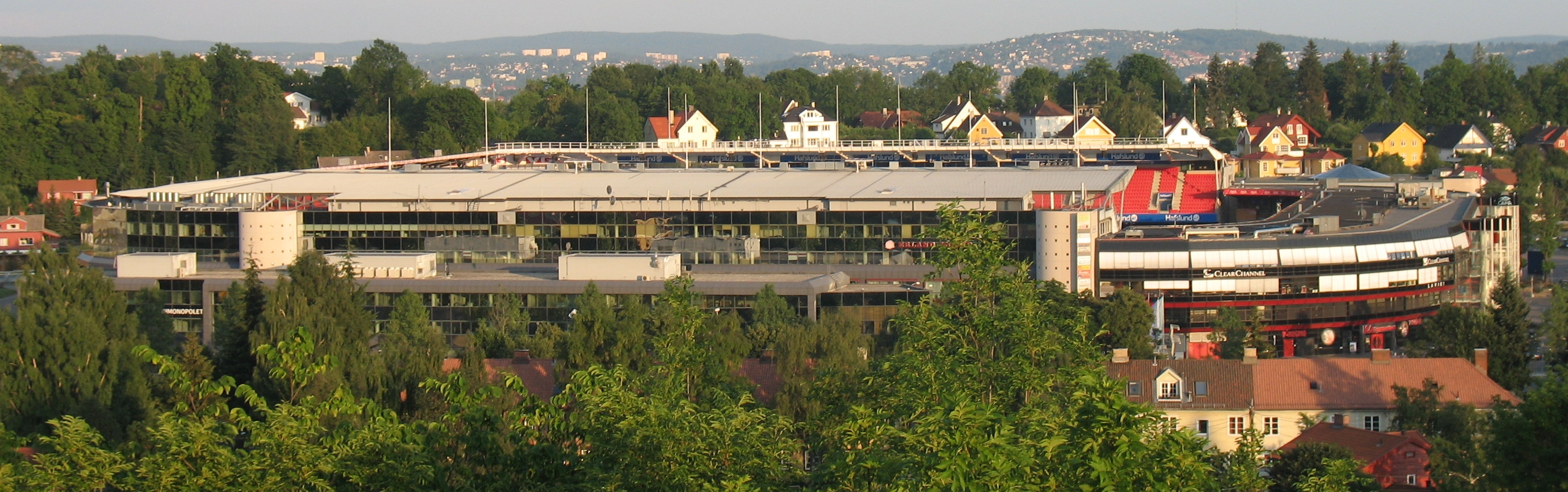
Ullevaal Stadion, Oslo - venue for the Norwegian Cup final

The 2016 Norwegian Football Cup was the 111th season of the Norwegian annual knock-out football tournament. It began with qualification matches in March 2016. The first round was played on 13 April 2016 and the tournament concluded with the final on 20 November 2016.

The victory would have earned Rosenborg a place in the second qualifying round of the 2017–18 UEFA Europa League, but since the club already had qualified to the 2017–18 UEFA Champions League as winners of the 2016 Tippeligaen, this berth was passed down to Haugesund, fourth-place finishers in the league.

== Calendar ==
Below are the dates for each round as given by the official schedule:

Round	Main date	Number of fixtures	Clubs
First Qualifying Round	3–16 March 2016	96	272 → 176
Second Qualifying Round	30 March 2016	48	176 → 128
First Round	13 April 2016	64	128 → 64
Second Round	27 April 2016	32	64 → 32
Third Round	4 May 2016	16	32 → 16
Fourth Round	25 May 2016	8	16 → 8
Quarter-finals	21–22 September 2016	4	8 → 4
Semi-finals	26–27 October 2016	2	4 → 2
Final	20 November 2016	1	2 → 1

== First round ==
Number of teams per tier entering this round
Tippeligaen (1)	1. divisjon (2)	2. divisjon (3)	3. divisjon (4)	4. divisjon (5)	Total
16 / 16	16 / 16	50 / 56	84 / 164	8 / 316	128 / 568

12 April 2016	Stord (3)	1–8	(1) Haugesund	Stord
17:00 CEST (UTC+2)	Grov 32'	Report	Kiss 10'; Troost-Ekong 38'; Mensah 59'; Ibrahim 73', 83'; Karikari 77', 88'; Granheim 87' (o.g.)	Stadium: Vikahaugane Kunstgress; Attendance: 1,250; Referee: Svein Tore Sinnes

12 April 2016	Aurskog-Høland (4)	1–4	(1) Lillestrøm	Løken
18:00 CEST (UTC+2)	Vestreng 27'	Report	Vilhjálmsson 7', 62', 90+2'; Jradi 65'	Stadium: Høland stadion kg Attendance: 1,400; Referee: Ajdin Medic

13 April 2016	Fram Larvik (3)	3–0	(3) Fløy	Larvik
17:00 CEST (UTC+2)	Rosland 20'; Naglestad 45'; Alaskari 75'	Report		Stadium: Fram Stadion; Attendance: 369; Referee: Nedim Brbovic

13 April 2016	Fløya (4)	0–6	(1) Bodø/Glimt	Tromsø
17:00 CEST (UTC+2)		Report	Wiig 32', 90'; Azemi 55'; Hauge 71', 82', 85'	Stadium: Fløyabanen; Attendance: 285; Referee: Sander Johannessen

13 April 2016	Junkeren (4)	0–1	(3) Tromsdalen	Bodø
17:00 CEST (UTC+2)		Report	Kristoffersen 64'	Stadium: Aspmyra Kunstgress; Attendance: 176; Referee: Kristian Kristiansen

13 April 2016	Østsiden (4)	2–3 (a.e.t.)	(2) Fredrikstad	Fredrikstad
17:45 CEST (UTC+2)	Lunde 82'; Hoti 95'	Report	Begby 89', 118'; Brix 105'	Stadium: Østsiden sports Attendance: 650; Referee: Magnus Koløy

13 April 2016	Nesodden (4)	0–6	(3) Moss	Nesoddtangen
18:00 CEST (UTC+2)		Report	Chaib 9'; Ness 20', 26', 71', 84'; Klaussen 89'	Stadium: Berger idrettspark Referee: Ola Skjørli Oterhals

13 April 2016	Ås (4)	0–5	(1) Sarpsborg 08	Ås
18:00 CEST (UTC+2)		Report	Bosetti 14'; Ernemann 32'; Tokstad 44'; Heintz 48'; Kirkevold 57'	Stadium: Ås stadion kunstgress Attendance: 334; Referee: Henrik Andreas Grenå Pettersen

13 April 2016	Sparta Sarpsborg (4)	2–0	(3) Follo	Sarpsborg
18:00 CEST (UTC+2)	Horvei 73' (pen.); Mathiesen 90'	Report		Stadium: Sarpsborg Stadion; Referee: Harald Vollstad Sletner

13 April 2016	Kvik Halden (3)	3–1	(3) Ullern	Halden
18:00 CEST (UTC+2)	Khattab 12'; Taletović 71'; Kaili 90'	Report	Myhre 5'	Stadium: Halden Stadion; Attendance: 283; Referee: Ali al Hatam

13 April 2016	Kråkerøy (4)	0–2	(2) KFUM Oslo	Kråkerøy
18:00 CEST (UTC+2)		Report	Rasch 12'; Obeng 74'	Stadium: Kråkerøy Stadium; Attendance: 84; Referee: Sebastian Mikalsen

13 April 2016	Lillehammer (4)	3–2	(3) Nybergsund	Lillehammer
18:00 CEST (UTC+2)	Vatne 51'; Sigtbakken 97'; Botten 117'	Report	Nygård 66'; Storbæk 118'	Stadium: Stampesletta; Attendance: 50; Referee: Mohammad Hafezi

13 April 2016	Brumunddal (3)	1–6	(2) Ull/Kisa	Brumunddal
18:00 CEST (UTC+2)	Aalmen 40'	Report	Andreasson 12'; Braaten 20'; Fjeldberg 37'; Langås 42'; Ødemarksbakken 56', 62'	Stadium: Sveum Idrettspark; Referee: Anders Gjermshus

13 April 2016	Gjøvik-Lyn (3)	3–0	(2) Raufoss	Gjøvik
18:00 CEST (UTC+2)	Alegre 44'; Carvalho 53', 89'	Report		Stadium: Vardal idrettspark Referee: Shervin Enger Heydary

13 April 2016	Løten (5)	1–4	(1) Vålerenga	Løten
18:00 CEST (UTC+2)	Mellum 2'	Report	Ómarsson 11', 21'; Castro 50'; Udahl 67'	Stadium: Løten Stadion; Attendance: 2,813; Referee: Henrik Ingwardo

13 April 2016	Vestfossen (4)	2–4	(3) Bærum	Vestfossen
18:00 CEST (UTC+2)	Torgersen 69', 85'	Report	Tekle 13'; Aubert 33'; Fredriksen 67'; Tafesse 83' (pen.)	Stadium: Strandajordet kunstgress Attendance: 250; Referee: Ole-Martin Loeshagen

13 April 2016	Elverum (3)	2–1	(3) Tynset	Elverum
18:00 CEST (UTC+2)	Edvardsen 4'; Hjelmseth 80'	Report	Aakerøien 53'	Stadium: Sentralidrettsplassen; Attendance: 270; Referee: Per Erik Haugen

13 April 2016	Valdres (4)	1–5	(1) Sogndal	Fagernes
18:00 CEST (UTC+2)	Mönell 87'	Report	Opseth 4'; Sarr 8'; Holsæter 53'; Flo 64', 89'	Stadium: Blåbærmyra; Attendance: 700; Referee: Tommy Frydenlund

13 April 2016	Korsvoll (4)	1–4	(1) Stabæk	Oslo
18:00 CEST (UTC+2)	Thun 24'	Report	Kassi 41'; Mehmeti 86'; Omoijuanfo 83'; Eghan 90'	Stadium: Korsvollbanen; Referee: Anders Hauglund

13 April 2016	Skeid (3)	1–3	(2) Strømmen	Oslo
18:00 CEST (UTC+2)	Hassan 27'	Report	Konate 23' (pen.); Brændsrød 61', 79'	Stadium: Nordre Åsen kunstgress Attendance: 150; Referee: Ali Iqbal Tahir

13 April 2016	Lyn (4)	0–7	(1) Tromsø	Oslo
18:00 CEST (UTC+2)		Report	Olsen 33', 35'; Moussa 39'; Ingebrigtsen 62', 76'; Gundersen 69'; Michalsen 90+1'	Stadium: Bislett Stadium; Attendance: 2,129; Referee: Ole-Alexander Ekeli Valen

13 April 2016	Funnefoss/Vormsund (4)	2–3	(3) Asker	Oppåkermoen
18:00 CEST (UTC+2)	Brenna 14'; Moltzau 74'	Report	Mauritz-Hansen 6', 8'; Solhaug 48'	Stadium: Funnefoss stadion Referee: Tore Olsen Hagelund

13 April 2016	Flisa (4)	0–1	(2) Kongsvinger	Flisa
18:00 CEST (UTC+2)		Report	Ellingsen 73'	Stadium: Flisa Stadium; Attendance: 450; Referee: Jørgen Haugen

13 April 2016	Tønsberg (3)	5–2	(3) Oppsal	Tønsberg
18:00 CEST (UTC+2)	Eriksen 12'; Jensen 24'; Johansen 54'; Andersen 90', 90'	Report	Paulsberg 15'; Ahmadi 70'	Stadium: Tønsberg Gressbane; Attendance: 171; Referee: Kristoffer Helgerud

13 April 2016	Ørn-Horten (3)	0–3	(3) Kjelsås	Horten
18:00 CEST (UTC+2)		Report	Garnås 16'; Solli 28'; Aslaksrud 89'	Stadium: Lystlunden; Referee: Haakon Magan Ljunggren

13 April 2016	Kongsberg (4)	1–8	(1) Strømsgodset	Kongsberg
18:00 CEST (UTC+2)	Schia 44'	Report	Nguen 2', 56', 75'; Ovenstad 11'; Moen 14'; Agouda 32'; Storflor 42'; Berg 58' (o.g.)	Stadium: Kongsberg kunstgress Referee: Mohammad Usman Aslam

13 April 2016	Åkra (4)	0–3	(3) Vard Haugesund	Åkrahamn
18:00 CEST (UTC+2)		Report	Kvalvågnes 53', 66'; Drivenes 82'	Stadium: Åkra Stadium; Attendance: 300; Referee: Aleksander S. Vermundsen

13 April 2016	Frøyland (4)	0–1	(3) Egersund	Stavanger
18:00 CEST (UTC+2)		Report	Óscar 73'	Stadium: Viking Stadion; Attendance: 150; Referee: Cosmin Dima

13 April 2016	Vardeneset (4)	1–5	(1) Viking	Stavanger
18:00 CEST (UTC+2)	Hebnes 65'	Report	Udoh 40'; Pedersen 43', 59', 62', 78'	Stadium: Modenabanen; Attendance: 1,650; Referee: Ola Kellerhals

13 April 2016	Riska (4)	2–3	(2) Bryne	Riska
18:00 CEST (UTC+2)	Haugland 19'; Fløysvik 76'	Report	Bøgild 9'; Holmvik 83'; Grødem 87'	Stadium: Riska Stadium; Attendance: 400; Referee: Orjan Vikene

13 April 2016	Sola (3)	1–3	(3) Vidar	Sola
18:00 CEST (UTC+2)	Rasmussen 90'	Report	Flåte 28'; Refvik 61'; Jakobsen 81'	Stadium: Sola Stadium; Attendance: 100; Referee: Mischa Huru Kellerhals

13 April 2016	Notodden (3)	3–1	(3) Lørenskog	Notodden
18:00 CEST (UTC+2)	Hafsteinsson 25'; Velta 30'; Johansen 85'	Report	Ouhadou 60'	Stadium: Notodden Stadion; Attendance: 357; Referee: Stian Magnussen

13 April 2016	Tollnes (5)	0–5	(1) Odd	Skien
18:00 CEST (UTC+2)		Report	Bergan 6'; Nilsen 51'; Bentley 79'; Johansen 80', 84'	Stadium: Tollnes stadion Attendance: 1,216; Referee: Tim Nicolai Fjellvang

13 April 2016	Vigør (4)	1–2 (a.e.t.)	(2) Jerv	Kristiansand
18:00 CEST (UTC+2)	Høyland 77'	Report	Ogungbaro 64'; Toft 111'	Stadium: Hellemyr kunstgress Referee: Jon Romuld Haaversen

13 April 2016	Charlottenlund (4)	3–4 (a.e.t.)	(2) Levanger	Trondheim
18:00 CEST (UTC+2)	Brekke 5'; Vikestad 65', 90+3'	Report	Bye 43'; Stokke 47', 95'; Aas 87'	Stadium: Charlottenlund kunstgress Attendance: 350; Referee: Rikhard Haugen Lyng

13 April 2016	Godøy (5)	1–6	(2) Hødd	Godøy
18:00 CEST (UTC+2)	Brynestad 80'	Report	Karlsen 26', 56'; Magnussen 39', 59', 81'; Myklebust 58'	Stadium: Godøy kunstgress Attendance: 700; Referee: Mathias Smehus Kringstadbukta

13 April 2016	Spjelkavik (4)	0–1	(1) Aalesund	Spjelkavik
18:00 CEST (UTC+2)		Report	Abdellaoue 50' (pen.)	Stadium: Spjelkavik stadion Referee: Marius Hansen Grøtta

13 April 2016	KIL/Hemne (4)	1–2	(3) Nardo	Kyrksæterøra
18:00 CEST (UTC+2)	Aarvaag 29' (pen.)	Report	Johnsen 5'; Solem 12'	Stadium: Hemne Savings Bank Arena; Attendance: 150; Referee: Kristian Aune

13 April 2016	Trygg/Lade (4)	0–2	(2) Ranheim	Trondheim
18:00 CEST (UTC+2)		Report	Flatgård 41'; Riksvold 71'	Stadium: Obos Kunstgressbane; Attendance: 256; Referee: Thomas Solum Lystad

13 April 2016	Kolstad (4)	0–2	(3) Byåsen	Trondheim
18:00 CEST (UTC+2)		Report	Hanssen 10'; Gunnes 79'	Stadium: Huseby idrettspark Referee: Erlend Helmersen

13 April 2016	Stjørdals-Blink (3)	3–3 (a.e.t.) (4–3 p)	(3) Strindheim	Stjørdalshalsen
18:00 CEST (UTC+2)	Fiske 65'; Sollihaug 90'; Šišić 105'	Report	Ingebrigtsen 35'; Lund 86'; Torgersen 111' (pen.)	Stadium: Nye Blinkbanen; Attendance: 181; Referee: Mads Følstad Skarsem
	Penalties
	Lillebo (penalty scored); Stokke (penalty scored); Nygaard (penalty scored); Nynes (penalty missed); Hermo (penalty scored)		(penalty scored) Torgersen (penalty missed); (penalty scored) Ingebrigtsen (penalty missed); (penalty scored) Ramstad

13 April 2016	Åfjord (5)	0–3	(1) Rosenborg	Åfjord
18:00 CEST (UTC+2)		Report	Stamnestrø 55', 76'; Skarsem 86'	Stadium: Åset stadion Attendance: 2,406; Referee: Kent Ove Hammer

13 April 2016	Herd (4)	2–2 (a.e.t.) (4–2 p)	(2) Kristiansund BK	Ålesund
18:00 CEST (UTC+2)	A. Rekdal 43' (pen.); Kristjansson 83'	Report	Diop 36'; Bamba 55'	Stadium: Amfi Moa Stadion; Referee: Øystein Ytterland
	Penalties
	Ingebrigtsen (penalty scored) (penalty scored); Sæther (penalty scored); C. Rekdal (penalty scored)		(penalty missed) Hopmark; (penalty scored) Økland (penalty scored); (penalty missed) Qaka

13 April 2016	Tertnes (4)	0–5	(2) Åsane	Bergen
18:00 CEST (UTC+2)		Report	Lerpold 9', 31'; Vindal 39' (o.g.); Aase 43'; Raum 80' (pen.)	Stadium: Åstveit idrettspark 1 Attendance: 300; Referee: Anders Bjerk Hansen

13 April 2016	Fyllingsdalen (3)	1–1 (a.e.t.) (2–4 p)	(4) Varegg	Bergen
18:00 CEST (UTC+2)	Langeland 33'	Report	Ingebrigtsen 4'	Stadium: Varden Amfi; Attendance: 249; Referee: Bjarte Sandal
	Penalties
	Kampenes (penalty missed); Langeland (penalty scored); Kalsaas (penalty scored); Kalve (penalty missed)		(penalty scored) Anfinsen; (penalty scored) Ulvestad; (penalty scored) Sjursæther; (penalty scored) Aabrekk

13 April 2016	Os (4)	2–3 (a.e.t.)	(3) Lysekloster	Osøyro
18:00 CEST (UTC+2)	Lunde 6'; Mikkelsen 90+5'	Report	Jonassen 9'; Zhubi 39'; Sæthre 100'; Helland 116'	Stadium: Kuventræ; Attendance: 1,000; Referee: André Knudsen Arnholt

13 April 2016	Sotra (4)	1–3	(3) Fana	Fjell
18:00 CEST (UTC+2)	Fejzi 55'	Report	Liseth 56'; Heimark 66'; Dankertsen 82'	Stadium: Nest-Sotra Fotball; Referee: Ruben Haugland

13 April 2016	Kristiansund FK (3)	0–6	(1) Molde	Kristiansund
18:00 CEST (UTC+2)		Report	Amang 17'; Bakenga 32', 78', 85' (pen.); Strand 65'; Agnaldo 76'	Stadium: Gressbanen; Referee: Even Myrheim

13 April 2016	Førde (3)	0–0 (a.e.t.) (5–4 p)	(1) Brann	Førde
18:00 CEST (UTC+2)		Report		Stadium: Førde stadion Attendance: 2,200; Referee: Steinar Hauge
	Penalties
	Iversen (penalty scored); Savland (penalty scored); Melhus (penalty scored); Myrkaskog (penalty scored); Attila (penalty scored)		(penalty scored) Grønner; (penalty missed) Acosta; (penalty scored) Nilsen; (penalty scored) Skålevik; (penalty scored) Barmen

13 April 2016	Brattvåg (3)	2–1 (a.e.t.)	(3) Florø	Brattvåg
18:00 CEST (UTC+2)	Aarsund 34'; Nekrouf 95'	Report	Solheim 65'	Stadium: Brattvåg Stadion; Attendance: 202; Referee: Torgeir Throat

13 April 2016	Vestsiden-Askøy (4)	2–4	(3) Nest-Sotra	Askøy
18:00 CEST (UTC+2)	Geijerstam 48'; Ravnanger 88'	Report	Furdal 30' (pen.), 82'; Holmqvist 45'; Pluemjai 75'	Stadium: Ravnanger gras Referee: Vebjørn Haugland

13 April 2016	Senja (3)	1–1 (a.e.t.) (10–9 p)	(4) Skjervøy	Silsand
18:00 CEST (UTC+2)	Hanssen 120'	Report	Johansen 113'	Stadium: Islandbotn; Attendance: 1,000; Referee: Tom-Jøran Henriksen Solstrand
	Penalties
	Hanssen (penalty scored); Laugsand (penalty scored); Jensen (penalty scored); Trosten (penalty scored); Vucenovic (penalty missed); Melseth (penalty missed); Johnsgård (penalty scored); Lind (penalty scored); Mikkelsen (penalty scored); Bakkelund (penalty scored); Hanssen (penalty scored); Laugsand (penalty scored)		(penalty scored) B. Thomassen; (penalty scored) Nilsen; (penalty missed) Wiik; (penalty scored) Johansen; (penalty scored) Mortensen; (penalty missed) S. Thomassen; (penalty scored) Edholm; (penalty scored) Olsen; (penalty scored) Pedersen; (penalty scored) Skallebø; (penalty scored) B. Thomassen; (penalty missed) Nilsen

13 April 2016	Harstad (3)	0–1	(4) Mjølner	Harstad
18:00 CEST (UTC+2)		Report	Nilsen 5'	Stadium: Harstad Stadion; Attendance: 172; Referee: Geir-Oskar Isaksen

13 April 2016	Eidsvold Turn (4)	0–0 (a.e.t.) (3–2 p)	(3) HamKam	Eidsvoll
19:00 CEST (UTC+2)		Report		Stadium: Myhrer stadion Attendance: 275; Referee: Sulman Maroof Hussain
	Penalties
	Trøen (penalty scored); Økland (penalty scored); Gawęcki (penalty missed); Solberg (penalty scored)		(penalty missed) Semou; (penalty scored) Hagen; (penalty scored) Dahle; (penalty missed) Leliūga; (penalty missed) Rise

13 April 2016	Halsen (4)	0–8	(2) Sandefjord	Larvik
19:00 CEST (UTC+2)		Report	Offenberg 27'; Kovács 41'; Sellin 54', 59', 74'; Seck 58'; Mjelde 80'; Sødlund 81'	Stadium: Bergeskogen KG; Attendance: 813; Referee: Shpejtim Lipoveci

13 April 2016	Sandnessjøen (4)	0–1	(3) Mo	Sandnessjøen
19:00 CEST (UTC+2)		Report	Teigen 60'	Stadium: Stamnes kunstgress Attendance: 250; Referee: Geir Håkon Olsen

13 April 2016	Salangen (4)	0–1	(3) Finnsnes	Sjøvegan
19:30 CEST (UTC+2)		Report	Løvland 27'	Stadium: Idrettsheia kunstgress Attendance: 200; Referee: Kevin Bakketun Hjelmseth

14 April 2016	Kirkenes (4)	2–5 (a.e.t.)	(3) Alta	Kirkenes
16:30 CEST (UTC+2)	Vučenović 35' (pen.); Mannsverk 74'	Report	Jacobsen 53'; Olsen 82'; Nikolaisen 102', 108', 112'	Stadium: Kirkenes Stadion; Referee: Sander Magdalon Bråten Johannessen

14 April 2016	Grorud (3)	4–2 (a.e.t.)	(3) Pors Grenland	Oslo
18:00 CEST (UTC+2)	Zirak 59'; Can 93'; Slorby 111'; Kastrati 116'	Report	Elsebutangen 20'; Thommesen 104'	Stadium: Grorud matchbane Attendance: 102; Referee: Eivind Bodding

14 April 2016	Holmen (4)	1–4	(2) Mjøndalen	Holmen
18:00 CEST (UTC+2)	Hole 26' (pen.)	Report	Pellegrino 23', 73', 84'; Stilson 57'	Stadium: Holmen Arena; Referee: Kristian Konstali Randen

14 April 2016	Madla (4)	1–2	(2) Sandnes Ulf	Madla
18:00 CEST (UTC+2)	Aano 77'	Report	Nisja 16', 38'	Stadium: ISS Stadion; Attendance: 670; Referee: Daniel Higraff

14 April 2016	Donn (4)	0–8	(1) Start	Kristiansand
18:00 CEST (UTC+2)		Report	Vikstøl 40'; Sandnes 52'; Ajer 47'; Sigurdsen 55', 90+3'; Rasmussen 83' (pen.); Segberg 86'; Salvesen 90+1'	Stadium: Kristiansand Stadion; Attendance: 533; Referee: Marius Lien

14 April 2016	Arendal (3)	2–3 (a.e.t.)	(3) Vindbjart	Arendal
18:00 CEST (UTC+2)	Pepa 16' (pen.), 55'	Report	Vindfjell 11'; Jansen 79'; Skeie 116'	Stadium: Bjønnes Stadion; Attendance: 461; Referee: Espen Larsen

14 April 2016	Hønefoss (3)	1–0	(3) Frigg	Hønefoss
18:00 CEST (UTC+2)	Hay 50'	Report		Stadium: Aka Arena; Attendance: 787; Referee: Espen Samuelsen

== Second round ==
Number of teams per tier entering this round
Tippeligaen (1)	1. divisjon (2)	2. divisjon (3)	3. divisjon (4)	4. divisjon (5)	Total
15 / 16	14 / 16	29 / 56	6 / 164	0 / 316	64 / 568

26 April 2016	Eidsvold Turn (4)	0–1	(1) Strømsgodset	Oslo
18:00 CEST (UTC+2)		Report	Júnior 77'	Stadium: Hobart Arena; Attendance: 928; Referee: Anders Gjermshus

27 April 2016	Kjelsås (3)	0–1	(2) Sandefjord	Oslo
18:00 CEST (UTC+2)		Report	Kovács 71'	Stadium: Grefsen Stadion; Attendance: 228; Referee: Tommy Frydenlund

27 April 2016	Moss (3)	1–2	(2) Fredrikstad	Moss
18:00 CEST (UTC+2)	Ajeti 84'	Report	Karoliussen 24'; Kapidžić 25'	Stadium: Melløs Stadion; Attendance: 1,278; Referee: Henrik Ingwardo

27 April 2016	Grorud (3)	2–3	(1) Molde	Oslo
18:00 CEST (UTC+2)	Can 28' (pen.); Kastrati 80'	Report	Svendsen 32'; Diouf 72'; Elyounoussi 67' (pen.)	Stadium: Grorud Matchbane; Attendance: 1,307; Referee: Henrik Andreas Grenå Pettersen

27 April 2016	Asker (3)	2–2 (a.e.t.) (4–3 p)	(2) Mjøndalen	Asker
18:00 CEST (UTC+2)	Molde 16'; Celina 93'	Report	Boye 42'; Lindseth 105'	Stadium: Føyka Stadion; Attendance: 878; Referee: Per Erik Haugen
	Penalties
	Molde (penalty scored); Celina (penalty scored); Mauritz-Hansen (penalty scored); Håskjold (penalty scored); Harstad (penalty missed)		(penalty scored) Midtgarden; (penalty scored) Gauseth; (penalty scored) Lindseth; (penalty missed) Olie; (penalty missed) Gundersen

27 April 2016	Bærum (3)	2–0	(2) Ull/Kisa	Sandvika
18:00 CEST (UTC+2)	Amarh 25'; Aubert 88'	Report		Stadium: Sandvika Stadion; Attendance: 100; Referee: Anders Hauglund

27 April 2016	Strømmen (2)	3–1	(3) Notodden	Strømmen
18:00 CEST (UTC+2)	Melgalvis 29'; Nakkim 49'; Rødsand 55'	Report	Velta 8' (pen.)	Stadium: Strømmen Stadion; Attendance: 206; Referee: Ajdin Medic

27 April 2016	Fana (3)	1–3	(3) Nest-Sotra	Fana
18:00 CEST (UTC+2)	Wichne 85'	Report	Círak 42'; Furdal 45+1'; Walberg 49'	Stadium: Nesttun Idrettsplass; Attendance: 450; Referee: André Knudsen Arnholt

27 April 2016	Vard Haugesund (3)	0–3	(1) Viking	Haugesund
18:00 CEST (UTC+2)		Report	Bringaker 52'; Pedersen 61'; Adegbenro 90'	Stadium: Haugesund Stadion; Attendance: 500; Referee: Daniel Higraff

27 April 2016	Vidar (3)	2–2 (a.e.t.) (5–4 p)	(2) Bryne	Stavanger
18:00 CEST (UTC+2)	Westly 23'; Aasen 89'	Report	Grødem 41'; Undheim 90+4'	Stadium: Lassa Idrettspark; Attendance: 300; Referee: Ola Kellerhals
	Penalties
	Jakobsen (penalty scored); Berntsen (penalty scored); Christensen (penalty scored); Refvik (penalty scored); Westly (penalty scored)		(penalty scored) Fjelde; (penalty scored) Byskata; (penalty scored) Skartun; (penalty scored) Khalili; (penalty missed) Holmvik

27 April 2016	Lysekloster (3)	3–6 (a.e.t.)	(2) Åsane	Osøyro
18:00 CEST (UTC+2)	Nysæther 39'; Gaustad 51'; Sæthre 70'	Report	Stephensen 73'; Soltvedt 76'; Herrem 89', 95', 105'; Hammersland 118'	Stadium: Lysekloster Framo Idrettspark; Attendance: 582; Referee: Svein Tore Sinnes

27 April 2016	Brattvåg (3)	1–0	(2) Hødd	Brattvåg
18:00 CEST (UTC+2)	Berglund 30'	Report		Stadium: Brattvåg Stadion; Attendance: 470; Referee: Marius Hansen Grøtta

27 April 2016	Herd (4)	3–4 (a.e.t.)	(1) Aalesund	Ålesund
18:00 CEST (UTC+2)	Kristjansson 6', 12'; Rekdal 75'	Report	Fet 40'; J. Riise 87'; Abdellaoue 88', 103'	Stadium: Amfi Moa Stadion; Attendance: 1,600; Referee: Mathias Kringstad

27 April 2016	Nardo (3)	2–1	(2) Ranheim	Trondheim
18:00 CEST (UTC+2)	Togstad 14'; Lundal 49'	Report	Reginiussen 60'	Stadium: Nissekollen; Attendance: 150; Referee: Kent Ove Gomo Hammer

27 April 2016	Egersund (3)	0–2	(2) Sandnes Ulf	Egersund
18:00 CEST (UTC+2)		Report	Eriksen 54'; Helle 73'	Stadium: Idrettsparken; Attendance: 738; Referee: Orjan Vikene

27 April 2016	Lillehammer (4)	0–2	(1) Lillestrøm	Lillehammer
18:00 CEST (UTC+2)		Report	Brenden 71'; Ofkir 81'	Stadium: Stampesletta; Attendance: 993; Referee: Sulman Hussain

27 April 2016	Gjøvik-Lyn (3)	2–3	(2) KFUM Oslo	Gjøvik
18:00 CEST (UTC+2)	Hammer 24' (o.g.); Henriksveen 63'	Report	Sortevik 29'; Ekblom 57'; Norheim 65'	Stadium: Vardal idrettspark Attendance: 300; Referee: Ole Alexander Ekeli Valentine

27 April 2016	Elverum (3)	0–1	(2) Kongsvinger	Elverum
18:00 CEST (UTC+2)		Report	Streitlien 13'	Stadium: Sentralidrettsplassen; Attendance: 685; Referee: Torkel Jonsson Traedal

27 April 2016	Hønefoss (3)	1–3	(1) Vålerenga	Hønefoss
18:00 CEST (UTC+2)	Muqkurtaj 58'	Report	Zahid 15'; Brown 21'; Sakor 83'	Stadium: Aka Arena; Attendance: 1,519; Referee: Nedim Brbovic

27 April 2016	Vindbjart (3)	2–0	(2) Jerv	Vennesla
18:00 CEST (UTC+2)	Gausdal 28'; Vindfjell 89'	Report		Stadium: Moseidmoen; Attendance: 723; Referee: Jon Romuld Haaversen

27 April 2016	Fram Larvik (3)	0–3	(1) Start	Larvik
18:00 CEST (UTC+2)		Report	Nwakali 71'; Sandnes 73'; Wichne 81'	Stadium: Fram Stadion; Attendance: 952; Referee: Rohit Saggi

27 April 2016	Tønsberg (3)	0–6	(1) Odd	Tønsberg
18:00 CEST (UTC+2)		Report	Johansen 36'; Jensen 42'; Halvorsen 43', 55'; Berg 48', 61'	Stadium: Tønsberg Gressbane; Attendance: 933; Referee: Marius Lien

27 April 2016	Mjølner (4)	0–2	(1) Tromsø	Narvik
18:00 CEST (UTC+2)		Report	Johnsgård 13', 19'	Stadium: Narvik Stadium; Attendance: 540; Referee: Tom-Gjøran Henriksen

27 April 2016	Mo IL (3)	0–6	(1) Bodø/Glimt	Mo i Rana
18:00 CEST (UTC+2)		Report	Normann 8', 66'; Jevtović 22', 83'; Olsen 55'; Hauge 75'	Stadium: Nye Sagbakken stadion Attendance: 850; Referee: Geir-Oskar Isaksen

27 April 2016	Stjørdals-Blink (3)	1–0	(2) Levanger	Stjørdalshalsen
18:00 CEST (UTC+2)	Nygaard 40'	Report		Stadium: Nye Blinkbanen; Attendance: 440; Referee: Thomas Solum Lystad

27 April 2016	Byåsen (3)	1–5	(1) Rosenborg	Trondheim
18:00 CEST (UTC+2)	Snekvik 89'	Report	Riski 23'; Stamnestrø 29', 63'; Vilhjálmsson 48'; Þórarinsson 68'	Stadium: Byåsen Arena; Attendance: 1,561; Referee: Robert Eggen

28 April 2016	Sparta Sarpsborg (4)	1–7	(1) Stabæk	Sarpsborg
18:00 CEST (UTC+2)	Horvei 52' (pen.)	Report	Gorozia 17'; Omoijuanfo 29', 59'; Moe 75'; Issah 80'; Njie 90+2', 90+2'	Stadium: Sarpsborg Stadion; Referee: Jørgen Haugen

28 April 2016	Kvik Halden (3)	0–3	(1) Sarpsborg 08	Halden
18:00 CEST (UTC+2)		Report	Kirkevold 42'; Mortensen 74'; Nielsen 86'	Stadium: Halden Stadion; Attendance: 1,203; Referee: Christian Moen

28 April 2016	Varegg (4)	2–4	(1) Haugesund	Bergen
18:00 CEST (UTC+2)	Valsvik 10' (pen.); Anfinsen 54'	Report	Ibrahim 44'; Andreassen 45+1'; Karikari 75'; Kiss 89'	Stadium: Stemmemyren idrettsplass Attendance: 300; Referee: Anders Bjerk Hansen

28 April 2016	Førde (3)	0–1	(1) Sogndal	Førde
18:00 CEST (UTC+2)		Report	Bolseth 67'	Stadium: Førde stadion Attendance: 2,800; Referee: Kristoffer Hagenes

28 April 2016	Tromsdalen (3)	5–3	(3) Senja	Tromsø
18:00 CEST (UTC+2)	Lysvoll 13', 42', 88'; Mienna 18'; Mo 79'	Report	Mikkelsen 39' (o.g.); Laugsand 70' (pen.); Vucenovic 77'	Stadium: TUIL Arena; Referee: Geir Håkon Olsen

28 April 2016	Alta (3)	3–1	(3) Finnsnes	Alta
19:00 CEST (UTC+2)	Abelsen 24'; Overvik 105'; Braaten 119'	Report	Simonsen 20'	Stadium: Finnmarkshallen; Attendance: 384; Referee: Adrian Bjørkhaug Gjendemsjø

== Third round ==
Number of teams per tier entering this round
Tippeligaen (1)	1. divisjon (2)	2. divisjon (3)	3. divisjon (4)	4. divisjon (5)	Total
15 / 16	7 / 16	10 / 56	0 / 164	0 / 316	32 / 568

3 May 2016	Brattvåg (3)	1–1 (a.e.t.) (5–4 p)	(1) Aalesund	Brattvåg
19:00 CEST (UTC+2)	Høivik 92'	Report	Abdellaoue 116'	Stadium: Brattvåg Stadion; Attendance: 1,203; Referee: Steinar Hauge
	Penalties
	Mambouana (penalty scored); Høivik (penalty scored); Palacios (penalty scored); Nekrouf (penalty scored); Hildrestrand (penalty scored)		(penalty missed) O. Lie; (penalty scored) Kirkeskov; (penalty scored) B. H. Riise; (penalty scored) J. A. Riise; (penalty scored) Abdellaoue

4 May 2016	Nardo (3)	1–4	(1) Rosenborg	Trondheim
18:00 CEST (UTC+2)	Sevaldsen 50'	Report	Rashani 30' de Lanlay 37'; Bjørdal 66'; Svensson 86'	Stadium: Nissekollen; Attendance: 1,500; Referee: Mads Skarsem

4 May 2016	Nest-Sotra (3)	1–0	(1) Sogndal	Ågotnes
18:00 CEST (UTC+2)	Pluemjai 73'	Report		Stadium: Ågotnes Stadion; Attendance: 350; Referee: Trond Ivar Døvle

4 May 2016	Stjørdals-Blink (3)	2–1	(1) Molde	Stjørdalshalsen
18:00 CEST (UTC+2)	Sollihaug 6'; Hønnås 79'	Report	Amang 54'	Stadium: Nye Blinkbanen; Attendance: 1,950; Referee: Kristoffer Hagenes

4 May 2016	Tromsdalen (3)	2–3	(1) Tromsø	Tromsø
18:00 CEST (UTC+2)	Lysvoll 25'; Johnsen 90+4'	Report	Olsen 44'; Antonsen 67'; Andersen 85'	Stadium: TUIL Arena; Referee: Per Erik Haugen

4 May 2016	Åsane (2)	1–4	(1) Haugesund	Åsane
18:00 CEST (UTC+2)	Herrem 20'	Report	Kiss 25' (pen.); Karikari 29', 50'; Agdestein 42'	Stadium: Åsane Idrettspark; Attendance: 368; Referee: Ola Hobber Nilsen

4 May 2016	Vidar (3)	2–1	(1) Viking	Stavanger
18:00 CEST (UTC+2)	Westly 54'; Halgunset 63'	Report	Abdullahi 34'	Stadium: Lassa Idrettspark; Attendance: 600; Referee: Sivert Amland

4 May 2016	Bærum (3)	0–3	(1) Stabæk	Sandvika
18:00 CEST (UTC+2)		Report	Mehmeti 19', 51'; Meling 53'	Stadium: Sandvika Stadion; Attendance: 1,000; Referee: Torkel Jonsson Traedal

4 May 2016	Asker (3)	2–3	(1) Odd	Asker
18:00 CEST (UTC+2)	Harstad 10'; Bydal 90'	Report	Johansen 23', 54'; Halvorsen 78'	Stadium: Føyka Stadion; Attendance: 1,062; Referee: Christian Moen

4 May 2016	Kongsvinger (2)	1–1 (a.e.t.) (4–3 p)	(2) Strømmen	Kongsvinger
18:00 CEST (UTC+2)	Maikel 77'	Report	Øby 20'	Stadium: Gjemselund Stadion; Attendance: 1,151; Referee: Martin Lundby
	Penalties
	Maikel (penalty missed); Güven (penalty scored); Moldskred (penalty scored); Ellingsen (penalty scored); Sotiroglou (penalty scored)		(penalty missed) Konate; (penalty missed) Achrifi; (penalty scored) Nakkim; (penalty scored) Nilsen; (penalty scored) Melgalvis

4 May 2016	Sandefjord (2)	1–0	(1) Lillestrøm	Sandefjord
18:00 CEST (UTC+2)	Mjelde 41'	Report		Stadium: Komplett Arena; Attendance: 1,076; Referee: Bjorn Hansen

4 May 2016	Vindbjart (3)	1–2	(1) Strømsgodset	Vennesla
18:00 CEST (UTC+2)	Gausdal 14'	Report	Vilsvik 52'; Høiland 76'	Stadium: Moseidmoen; Attendance: 1,074; Referee: Jan Morten Tennøy

4 May 2016	Sandnes Ulf (2)	3–1	(1) Start	Sandnes
18:00 CEST (UTC+2)	Eriksen 7', 16'; Engblom 75'	Report	Salvesen 54'	Stadium: Sandnes Idrettspark; Attendance: 841; Referee: Rohit Saggi

4 May 2016	KFUM Oslo (2)	0–2	(1) Vålerenga	Oslo
19:00 CEST (UTC+2)		Report	Brown 71', 80'	Stadium: KFUM-Arena; Attendance: 1,800; Referee: Sigurd Kringstad

5 May 2016	Alta (3)	1–4	(1) Bodø/Glimt	Alta
18:00 CEST (UTC+2)	Nikolaisen 32'	Report	Azemi 14'; Olsen 26', 87'; Furebotn 73'	Stadium: Alta Idrettspark; Attendance: 790; Referee: Anders Gjermshus

5 May 2016	Fredrikstad (2)	1–3	(1) Sarpsborg 08	Fredrikstad
19:00 CEST (UTC+2)	Tønne 30'	Report	Mortensen 44'; Hansen 61'; Ernemann 73'	Stadium: Fredrikstad Stadion; Attendance: 6,544; Referee: Trygve Kjensli

== Fourth round ==
Number of teams per tier entering this round
Tippeligaen (1)	1. divisjon (2)	2. divisjon (3)	3. divisjon (4)	4. divisjon (5)	Total
9 / 16	3 / 16	4 / 56	0 / 164	0 / 316	16 / 568

25 May 2016	Tromsø (1)	3–2 (a.e.t.)	(1) Odd	Tromsø
18:00 CEST (UTC+2)	Moussa 13'; Espejord 78'; Olsen 102'	Report	Bentley 24', 44'	Stadium: Alfheim Stadion; Attendance: 1,433; Referee: Trygve Kjensli

25 May 2016	Vålerenga (1)	3–1	(3) Vidar	Oslo
18:00 CEST (UTC+2)	Sakor 20'; Brown 84'; Juklerød 90+3'	Report	Christensen 56'	Stadium: Ullevaal Stadion; Attendance: 1,496; Referee: Sigurd Kringstad

25 May 2016	Strømsgodset (1)	1–0	(1) Stabæk	Drammen
18:00 CEST (UTC+2)	Pedersen 39'	Report		Stadium: Marienlyst Stadion; Attendance: 3,801; Referee: Kai Erik Steen

25 May 2016	Sarpsborg 08 (1)	3–0	(3) Stjørdals-Blink	Sarpsborg
18:00 CEST (UTC+2)	Hovda 12'; Lindberg 73'; Mbedule 79'	Report		Stadium: Sarpsborg Stadion; Attendance: 2,298; Referee: Trond Ivar Døvle

25 May 2016	Bodø/Glimt (1)	3–3 (a.e.t.) (7–6 p)	(1) Haugesund	Bodø
18:00 CEST (UTC+2)	Normann 48'; Azemi 84'; Furebotn 101'	Report	Mæland 81', 99'; Agdestein 88'	Stadium: Aspmyra Stadion; Attendance: 942; Referee: Ola Hobber Nilsen
	Penalties
	Babenko (penalty scored); Jevtović (penalty scored); Bjørnbak (penalty scored); Saltnes (penalty scored); Olsen (penalty missed); Hauge (penalty scored); Furebotn (penalty scored); Jacobsen (penalty scored)		(penalty scored) Kiss; (penalty scored) Agdestein; (penalty scored) Mæland; (penalty missed) Tronstad; (penalty scored) Hajradinović; (penalty scored) Stølås; (penalty scored) Skjerve; (penalty missed) Bjørkkjær

25 May 2016	Kongsvinger (2)	1–0	(3) Brattvåg	Kongsvinger
19:00 CEST (UTC+2)	Güven 72'	Report		Stadium: Gjemselund Stadion; Attendance: 1,447; Referee: Kristoffer Hagenes

25 May 2016	Sandefjord (2)	2–1	(2) Sandnes Ulf	Sandefjord
19:00 CEST (UTC+2)	Storbæk 56'; Fevang 90+1'	Report	Engblom 70'	Stadium: Komplett Arena; Attendance: 1,202; Referee: Espen Eskås

25 May 2016	Rosenborg (1)	3–1	(3) Nest-Sotra	Trondheim
20:05 CEST (UTC+2)	Midtsjø 6'; Vilhjálmsson 9'; Helland 90+1'	Report	Reitan 7' (o.g.)	Stadium: Lerkendal Stadion; Attendance: 3,473; Referee: Tommy Skjerven

== Quarter-finals ==
Number of teams per tier entering this round
Tippeligaen (1)	1. divisjon (2)	2. divisjon (3)	3. divisjon (4)	4. divisjon (5)	Total
6 / 16	2 / 16	0 / 56	0 / 164	0 / 316	8 / 568

21 September 2016	Bodø/Glimt (1)	4–0	(1) Sarpsborg 08	Bodø
18:00 CEST (UTC+2)	Manzon 5', 43'; Berg 77'; Osvold 90'	Report		Stadium: Aspmyra Stadion; Attendance: 1,456; Referee: Martin Lundby

21 September 2016	Tromsø (1)	1–1 (a.e.t.) (3–5 p)	(1) Rosenborg	Tromsø
20:00 CEST (UTC+2)	Olsen 53'	Report	Gytkjær 90'	Stadium: Alfheim Stadion; Attendance: 5,285; Referee: Ola Hobber Nilsen
	Penalties
	Andersen (penalty missed); Ødegaard (penalty scored); Sigurðarson (penalty scored); Ingebrigtsen (penalty scored)		(penalty scored) Helland; (penalty scored) Jensen; (penalty scored) Vilhjálmsson; (penalty scored) Gytkjær; (penalty scored) Bakenga

22 September 2016	Kongsvinger (2)	2–1	(2) Sandefjord	Kongsvinger
18:00 CEST (UTC+2)	Ellingsen 8'; Güven 70'	Report	Kevin Larsen 58'	Stadium: Gjemselund Stadion; Attendance: 2,210; Referee: Espen Eskås

22 September 2016	Strømsgodset (1)	2–0	(1) Vålerenga	Drammen
20:00 CEST (UTC+2)	Nakkim 45' (o.g.); Pedersen 50' (pen.)	Report		Stadium: Marienlyst Stadion; Attendance: 5,018; Referee: Tore Hansen

== Semi-finals ==
Number of teams per tier entering this round
Tippeligaen (1)	1. divisjon (2)	2. divisjon (3)	3. divisjon (4)	4. divisjon (5)	Total
3 / 16	1 / 16	0 / 56	0 / 164	0 / 316	4 / 568

26 October 2016	Rosenborg (1)	2–0	(1) Bodø/Glimt	Trondheim
20:00 CEST (UTC+2)	Midtsjø 22'; Skjelvik 90'	Report		Stadium: Lerkendal Stadion; Attendance: 12,453; Referee: Svein Oddvar Moen

27 October 2016	Strømsgodset (1)	1–2	(2) Kongsvinger	Drammen
20:00 CEST (UTC+2)	Tokstad 64'	Report	Pålerud 55'; Røyrane 73'	Stadium: Marienlyst Stadion; Attendance: 7,446; Referee: Tommy Skjerven

== Final ==
20 November 2016
13:15 CET (UTC+1)

Kongsvinger (2)	0–4	(1) Rosenborg
	Report	Helland 12', 63', 65'; Reginiussen 50'

Ullevaal Stadion, Oslo
Attendance: 26,912
Referee: Tore Hansen (Feda)

== Scorers ==
As of match played 20 November 2016

5 goals:

- (Norway) Thomas Lehne Olsen - Tromsø
- (Norway) Mustafa Abdellaoue - Aalesunds
- (Norway) Henrik Kjelsrud Johansen - Odds
- (Ghana) Kwame Karikari - Haugesund
- (Denmark) Patrick Pedersen - Viking

4 goals:

- (Norway) Magnus Nikolaisen - Alta
- (Norway) Geir André Herrem - Åsane
- (Norway) Jens Petter Hauge - Bodø/Glimt
- (Norway) Fabian Ness - Moss
- (Norway) Pål André Helland - Rosenborg
- (Norway) Magnus Stamnestrø - Rosenborg
- (Norway) Vegard Lysvoll - Tromsdalen
- (Jamaica) Deshorn Brown - Vålerenga

3 goals:

- (Norway) Fitim Azemi - Bodø/Glimt
- (Norway) Mathias Normann - Bodø/Glimt
- (Norway) Trond Olsen - Bodø/Glimt
- (Nigeria) Shuaibu Ibrahim - Haugesund
- (Slovakia) Filip Kiss - Haugesund
- (Iceland) Ingolfur Örn Kristjansson - Herd
- (Norway) Joachim Magnussen - Hødd
- (Iceland) Árni Vilhjálmsson - Lillestrøm
- (Norway) Amahl Pellegrino - Mjøndalen
- (Norway) Mushaga Bakenga - Molde / Rosenborg
- (Cameroon) Thomas Amang - Molde
- (Norway) Johnny Furdal - Nest-Sotra
- (Norway) Ole Jørgen Halvorsen - Odds
- (Nigeria) Bentley - Odds
- (Norway) Kjell Rune Sellin - Sandefjord
- (Norway) Kent Håvard Eriksen - Sandnes Ulf
- (Norway) Ohi Omoijuanfo - Stabæk
- (Albania) Agon Mehmeti - Stabæk
- (Norway) Tokmac Nguen - Strømsgodset

2 goals:

- (Norway) Wilhelm Pepa - Arendal
- (Norway) Niklas Lerpold - Åsane
- (Norway) Sindre Mauritz-Hansen - Asker
- (Norway) Jan Aubert - Bærum
- (Norway) Martin Wiig - Bodø/Glimt
- (Russia) Vadim Manzon - Bodø/Glimt
- (Serbia) Milan Jevtović - Bodø/Glimt
- (Norway) Magnus Grødem - Bryne
- (Norway) Robert Vikestad - Charlottenlund
- (Norway) Ludvig Begby - Fredrikstad
- (Brazil) Ramon Carvalho - Gjøvik-Lyn
- (Norway) Mesut Can - Grorud
- (Norway) Fisnik Kastrati - Grorud
- (Norway) Torbjørn Agdestein - Haugesund
- (Norway) Eirik Mæland - Haugesund
- (Norway) Andreas Rekdal - Herd
- (Norway) Michael Karlsen - Hødd
- (Norway) Robert Vikestad - Jerv
- (Norway) Martin Ellingsen - Kongsvinger
- (Norway) Adem Güven - Kongsvinger
- (Norway) Benjamin Stokke - Levanger
- (Norway) Ståle Steen Sæthre - Lysekloster
- (Thailand) Kittiphong Pluemjai - Nest-Sotra
- (Norway) Borgar Velta - Notodden
- (Norway) Oliver Berg - Odds
- (Norway) Fredrik Midtsjø - Rosenborg
- (Iceland) Matthías Vilhjálmsson - Rosenborg
- (Hungary) Péter Kovács - Sandefjord
- (Norway) Erik Mjelde - Sandefjord
- (Norway) Vidar Nisja - Sandnes Ulf
- (Sweden) Pontus Engblom - Sandnes Ulf
- (Denmark) Steffen Ernemann - Sarpsborg 08
- (Norway) Pål Alexander Kirkevold - Sarpsborg 08
- (Denmark) Patrick Mortensen - Sarpsborg 08
- (Norway) Fredrik Flo - Sogndal
- (Norway) Atle Horvei - Sparta Sarpsborg
- (Norway) Moussa Njie - Stabæk
- (Norway) Lars-Jørgen Salvesen - Start
- (Norway) Robert Sandnes - Start
- (Norway) Lasse Sigurdsen - Start
- (Norway) Jørgen Sollihaug - Stjørdals-Blink
- (Norway) Markus Brændsrød - Strømmen
- (Norway) Marcus Pedersen - Strømsgodset
- (Norway) Nikolai Andersen - Tønsberg
- (Norway) Mikael Ingebrigtsen - Tromsø
- (Norway) Christer Johnsgård - Tromsø
- (Tunisia) Sofien Moussa - Tromsø
- (Norway) Kristoffer Ødemarksbakken - Ull/Kisa
- (Iceland) Elías Már Ómarsson - Vålerenga
- (Norway) Vajebah Sakor - Vålerenga
- (Norway) Mats Anguish Vågnes - Vard Haugesund
- (Norway) Martin Torgersen - Vestfossen
- (Norway) Andreas Westly - Vidar
- (Norway) Øyvind Gausdal - Vindbjart
- (Norway) Victor Vindfjell - Vindbjart

1 goals:

- (Norway) Sondre Brunstad Fet - Aalesunds
- (Norway) John Arne Riise - Aalesunds
- (Norway) Felix Adrian Jacobsen - Alta
- (Norway) Øyvind Veseth Olsen - Alta
- (Norway) Runar Overvik - Alta
- (Norway) Mathias Abelsen - Alta
- (Norway) Vegard Braaten - Alta
- (Norway) Steffen Vindal - Åsane
- (Norway) Peter Aase - Åsane
- (Norway) Joakim Hammersland - Åsane
- (Norway) Mathias Raum - Åsane
- (Norway) Kristoffer Stephensen - Åsane
- (Norway) Joachim Soltvedt - Åsane
- (Norway) Even Bydal - Asker
- (Norway) Behajdin Celina - Asker
- (Norway) Axel Harstad - Asker
- (Norway) Stian Stray Molde - Asker
- (Norway) Niklas Solhaug - Asker
- (Norway) Martin Vestreng - Aurskog-Høland
- (Kenya) Emanuel Kot Chol Tafesse - Bærum
- (Norway) Emmanuel Amarh - Bærum
- (Norway) Didrik Fredriksen - Bærum
- (Norway) Jonas Tekle - Bærum
- (Norway) Patrick Berg - Bodø/Glimt
- (Norway) Joachim Osvold - Bodø/Glimt
- (Norway) Henrik Furebotn - Bodø/Glimt
- (Norway) Thomas Aarsund - Brattvåg
- (Norway) Jan Philip Berglund - Brattvåg
- (Norway) Eirik Høivik - Brattvåg
- (Sweden) Lamine Larbi Nekrouf - Brattvåg
- (Norway) Hakon Aalma - Brumunddal
- (Norway) Mads Bøgild - Bryne
- (Norway) Bjørnar Holmvik - Bryne
- (Norway) Robert Undheim - Bryne
- (Norway) Andreas Hanssen - Byåsen
- (Norway) Arne Gunnes - Byåsen
- (Norway) Asgeir Snekvik - Byåsen
- (Norway) John Christoffer Brekke - Charlottenlund
- (Spain) Óscar - Egersunds
- (Norway) Robin Hjelmseth - Elverum
- (Sweden) Victor Edvardsen - Elverum
- (Norway) Sondre Liseth - Fana
- (Norway) Christian Heimark - Fana
- (Norway) Joachim Dankertsen - Fana
- (Norway) Marius Wichne - Fana
- (Norway) Andreas Løvland - Finnsnes
- (Norway) Jonas Simonsen - Finnsnes
- (Norway) Simen Reksten Solheim - Florø
- (Iraq) Ali Alaskari - Fram Larvik
- (Norway) Markus Naglestad - Fram Larvik
- (Norway) Erik Rosland - Fram Larvik
- (Denmark) Sanel Kapidžić - Fredrikstad
- (Norway) Kristian Brix - Fredrikstad
- (Norway) Patrik Karoliussen - Fredrikstad
- (Norway) Erik Tønne - Fredrikstad
- (Norway) Kim Brenna - Funnefoss/Vormsund
- (Norway) Ole Christian Moltzau - Funnefoss/Vormsund
- (Norway) Bjarne Langeland - Fyllingsdalen
- (Spain) Rubén Alegre - Gjøvik-Lyn
- (Norway) Øyvind Henriksveen - Gjøvik-Lyn
- (Norway) Trond Brynestad - Godøy
- (Norway) Zirak Ahmed - Grorud
- (Norway) Morten Slorby - Grorud
- (Ghana) Derrick Mensah - Haugesund
- (Nigeria) William Troost-Ekong - Haugesund
- (Norway) Tor Arne Andreassen - Haugesund
- (Norway) Magnus Myklebust - Hødd
- (Norway) Jakob Bergman Hole - Holmen
- (Albania) Durim Muqkurtaj - Hønefoss
- (Norway) Kristoffer Hay - Hønefoss
- (Nigeria) Michael Ogungbaro - Jerv
- (Norway) Jacob Toft - Jerv
- (Norway) Emil Ekblom - KFUM Oslo
- (Norway) John Olav Norheim - KFUM Oslo
- (Norway) Dennis Obeng - KFUM Oslo
- (Norway) Robin Rasch - KFUM Oslo
- (Norway) Stian Sortevik - KFUM Oslo
- (Norway) Håkon Aarvaag - KIL/Hemne
- (Norway) Miloš Vučenović - Kirkenes
- (Norway) Jonas Mannsverk - Kirkenes
- (Norway) Jens Aslaksrud - Kjelsås
- (Norway) Espen Garnås - Kjelsås
- (Norway) Jesper Solli - Kjelsås
- (Norway) Henrik Schia - Kongsberg
- (Norway) Lars Petter Streitlien - Kongsvinger
- (Norway) Ørjan Røyrane - Kongsvinger
- (Norway) Fredrik Mani Pålerud - Kongsvinger
- (Spain) Maikel Nieves - Kongsvinger
- (Norway) Adrian Thun - Korsvoll
- (Ivory Coast) Daouda Bamba - Kristiansund
- (Senegal) Amidou Diop - Kristiansund
- (Egypt) Sabri Khattab - Kvik Halden
- (Sweden) Almir Taletović - Kvik Halden
- (Norway) Deniz Kaili - Kvik Halden
- (Norway) Bendik Bye - Levanger
- (Norway) Jo Sondre Aas - Levanger
- (Norway) Joakim Vatne - Lillehammer
- (Norway) Erik Sigtbakken - Lillehammer
- (Norway) Mark Botten - Lillehammer
- (Lebanon) Bassel Jradi - Lillestrøm
- (Norway) Erik Brenden - Lillestrøm
- (Norway) Mohamed Ofkir - Lillestrøm
- (Norway) Imad Ouhadou - Lørenskog
- (Norway) Øyvind Mellum - Løten
- (Norway) Tommy Gaustad - Lysekloster
- (Norway) Thomas Helland - Lysekloster
- (Norway) Baste Jonassen - Lysekloster
- (Norway) Hans-Christian Nysæther - Lysekloster
- (Sweden) Petrit Zhubi - Lysekloster
- (Norway) Adrian Olsen Teigen - Mo
- (Norway) Alf Jakob Aano - Madla
- (Norway) Jonathan Lindseth - Mjøndalen
- (Norway) Michael Stilson - Mjøndalen
- (Senegal) Ousseynou Boye - Mjøndalen
- (Norway) Mohamed Elyounoussi - Molde
- (Norway) Petter Strand - Molde
- (Norway) Sander Svendsen - Molde
- (Senegal) Pape Paté Diouf - Molde
- (Kosovo) Bajram Ajeti - Moss
- (Norway) Youssef Chaib - Moss
- (Norway) Thomas Klaussen - Moss
- (Norway) Espen Eide Nilsen - Mjølner
- (Norway) Martin Johnsen - Nardo
- (Norway) Martin Lundal - Nardo
- (Norway) Sander Sevaldsen - Nardo
- (Norway) Joakim Solem - Nardo
- (Norway) Lars Arne Togstad - Nardo
- (Norway) Mats Walberg - Nest-Sotra
- (Sweden) Adnan Círak - Nest-Sotra
- (Sweden) Sebastian Holmqvist - Nest-Sotra
- (Iceland) Gudmundur Hafsteinsson - Notodden
- (Norway) Jim Johansen - Notodden
- (Norway) Semming Nygård - Nybergsund
- (Norway) Jarl André Storbæk - Nybergsund
- (Norway) Vegard Bergan - Odds
- (Norway) Fredrik Oldrup Jensen - Odds
- (Norway) Joakim Våge Nilsen - Odds
- (Norway) Mats Ulvund Paulsberg - Oppsal
- (Norway) Shåresh Ahmadi - Oppsal
- (Norway) Stian Lunde - Os
- (Norway) Marius Mikkelsen - Os
- (Norway) Joe Lunde - Østsiden
- (Norway) Faton Hoti - Østsiden
- (Norway) Thomas Elsebutangen - Pors Grenland
- (Norway) Atle Thommesen - Pors Grenland
- (Norway) Georg Flatgård - Ranheim
- (Norway) Mads Reginiussen - Ranheim
- (Norway) Kim Riksvold - Ranheim
- (Norway) Runar Fløysvik - Riska
- (Norway) Knut Haugland - Riska
- (Finland) Riku Riski - Rosenborg
- (Iceland) Guðmundur Þórarinsson - Rosenborg
- (Kosovo) Elbasan Rashani - Rosenborg
- (Norway) Johan Lædre Bjørdal - Rosenborg
- (Norway) Yann-Erik de Lanlay - Rosenborg
- (Norway) Olaus Jair Skarsem - Rosenborg
- (Norway) Jonas Svensson - Rosenborg
- (Norway) Jørgen Skjelvik - Rosenborg
- (Norway) Tore Reginiussen - Rosenborg
- (Denmark) Christian Gytkjær - Rosenborg
- (Norway) Geir Ludvig Fevang - Sandefjord
- (Norway) Eirik Offenberg - Sandefjord
- (Norway) André Sødlund - Sandefjord
- (Norway) Håvard Storbæk - Sandefjord
- (Norway) Kevin Larsen - Sandefjord
- (Senegal) Abdoulaye Seck - Sandefjord
- (Norway) Marius Helle - Sandnes Ulf
- (France) Alexy Bosetti - Sarpsborg 08
- (Norway) Ole Hansen - Sarpsborg 08
- (Norway) Tobias Heintz - Sarpsborg 08
- (Denmark) Matti Lund Nielsen - Sarpsborg 08
- (Norway) Kristoffer Tokstad - Sarpsborg 08
- (Norway) Tor Øyvind Hovda - Sarpsborg 08
- (Norway) Amani Mbedule - Sarpsborg 08
- (Sweden) Jonas Lindberg - Sarpsborg 08
- (Norway) Preben Yttergård Hanssen - Senja
- (Norway) Sondre Laugsand - Senja
- (Norway) Adrian Mikkelsen - Senja
- (Norway) Uros Vucenovic - Senja
- (Norway) Svenn Johansen - Skjervøy
- (Norway) Rune Bolseth - Sogndal
- (Norway) Ruben Holsæter - Sogndal
- (Norway) Kristian Fardal Opseth - Sogndal
- (Senegal) Babacar Sarr - Sogndal
- (Norway) Thomas Mathiesen - Sparta Sarpsborg
- (Iraq) Mustafa Hassan - Skeid
- (Norway) Kristoffer Rasmussen - Sola
- (Norway) Leutrim Leo Fejzi - Sotra
- (Ivory Coast) Luc Kassi - Stabæk
- (Georgia (country)) Giorgi Gorozia - Stabæk
- (Ghana) Shadrach Eghan - Stabæk
- (Ghana) Kamal Issah - Stabæk
- (Norway) Birger Meling - Stabæk
- (Norway) Jeppe Moe - Stabæk
- (Nigeria) Chidiebere Nwakali - Start
- (Norway) Rolf Daniel Vikstøl - Start
- (Norway) Kristoffer Ajer - Start
- (Norway) Mathias Rasmussen - Start
- (Norway) Erlend Segberg - Start
- (Norway) Eirik Wichne - Start
- (Norway) Vegard Fiske - Stjørdals-Blink
- (Norway) Tom-Rune Hønnås - Stjørdals-Blink
- (Norway) Anders Nygaard - Stjørdals-Blink
- (Norway) Nedzad Šišić - Stjørdals-Blink
- (Norway) Simen Grov - Stord Sunnhordland
- (Norway) Mats Ingebrigtsen - Strindheim
- (Norway) Fredrik Lund - Strindheim
- (Norway) Stian Torgersen - Strindheim
- (Senegal) Madiou Konate - Strømmen
- (Norway) Aleksander Melgalvis - Strømmen
- (Norway) Markus Nakkim - Strømmen
- (Norway) Olav Øby - Strømmen
- (Norway) Espen Rødsand - Strømmen
- (Norway) Abdul-Basit Agouda - Strømsgodset
- (Norway) Tommy Høiland - Strømsgodset
- (Norway) Petter Vaagan Moen - Strømsgodset
- (Norway) Martin Rønning Ovenstad - Strømsgodset
- (Norway) Øyvind Storflor - Strømsgodset
- (Norway) Lars-Christopher Vilsvik - Strømsgodset
- (Portugal) Francisco Júnior - Strømsgodset
- (Norway) Mathias Eriksen - Tønsberg
- (Norway) Thomas Utter Jensen - Tønsberg
- (Norway) Jonas Johansen - Tønsberg
- (Norway) Mathias Johnsen - Tromsdalen
- (Norway) Thomas Kristoffersen - Tromsdalen
- (Norway) Tor Martin Mienna - Tromsdalen
- (Somalia) Mohammed Ahamed - Tromsdalen
- (Norway) Magnus Andersen - Tromsø
- (Norway) Kent-Are Antonsen - Tromsø
- (Norway) Jostein Gundersen - Tromsø
- (Norway) Fredrik Michalsen - Tromsø
- (Norway) Runar Espejord - Tromsø
- (Norway) Morten Aaker Øien - Tynset
- (Sweden) Jesper Andreasson - Ull/Kisa
- (Norway) Thomas Braaten - Ull/Kisa
- (Norway) Jonas Fjeldberg - Ull/Kisa
- (Norway) Ole Kristian Langås - Ull/Kisa
- (Norway) Felix Horn Myhre - Ullern
- (Sweden) Dan Mönell - Valdres
- (Norway) Niklas Castro - Vålerenga
- (Norway) Simen Juklerød - Vålerenga
- (Norway) Henrik Udahl - Vålerenga
- (Norway) Ghayas Zahid - Vålerenga
- (Norway) Erlend Drivenes - Vard Haugesund
- (Norway) Mikal Olsen Hebnes - Vardeneset
- (Norway) Eirik Anfinsen - Varegg
- (Norway) Petter Ingebrigtsen - Varegg
- (Norway) Kristoffer Valsvik - Varegg
- (Norway) Nicklas Sjølie Af Geijerstam - Vestsiden-Askøy
- (Norway) Marius Haugland Ravnanger - Vestsiden-Askøy
- (Norway) Sander Flåte - Vidar
- (Norway) Eirik Jakobsen - Vidar
- (Norway) Carl-Henrik Refvik - Vidar
- (Norway) Vegard Aasen - Vidar
- (Norway) Ingvald Sandvik Halgunset - Vidar
- (Norway) Sigve Kleppa Christensen - Vidar
- (Norway) Martin Høyland - Vigør
- (Nigeria) Aniekpeno Udoh - Viking
- (Nigeria) Suleiman Abdullahi - Viking
- (Nigeria) Samuel Adegbenro - Viking
- (Norway) Mathias Bringaker - Viking
- (Norway) Jesper Jansen - Vindbjart
- (Norway) Preben Skeie - Vindbjart

Own goals:

- (Norway) Mads Granheim - Stord Sunnhordland (12 April 2016 vs Haugesund)
- (Norway) Erlend Dahl Reitan - Rosenborg (25 May 2016 vs Nest Sotra)
- (Norway) Marius Berg - Kongsberg (13 April 2016 vs Strømsgodset)
- (Norway) Jørgen Hammer - KFUM Oslo (27 April 2016 vs Gjøvik-Lyn)
