= 2016 Norwegian Football Cup final =

- Event: 2016 Norwegian Football Cup
Kongsvinger	Rosenborg
0	4
- Date: 20 November 2016
- Venue: Ullevaal Stadion, Oslo
- Referee: Tore Hansen
- Attendance: 26,912

The 2016 Norwegian Football Cup final was the final match of the 2016 Norwegian Football Cup, the 111th season of the Norwegian Football Cup, the premier Norwegian football cup competition organized by the Football Association of Norway (NFF). The match was played on 20 November 2016 at the Ullevaal Stadion in Oslo, and was contested between the First Division side Kongsvinger and the Tippeligaen side Rosenborg. Rosenborg defeated Kongsvinger 4–0 to claim the Norwegian Cup for an eleventh time in their history, and also become the first team in Norway to win the double two consecutive seasons.

== Route to the final ==
Kongsvinger		Round	Rosenborg	
Flisa (D3); A 1–0	Ellingsen 73'	First round	Åfjord (D4); A 3–0	Stamnestrø 55', 76', Skarsem 86'
Elverum (D2); A 1–0	Streitlien 13'	Second round	Byåsen (D2); A 5–1	Riski 23', Stamnestrø 29', 63', Vilhjálmsson 48', Þórarinsson 68'
Strømmen (D1); H 1–1 (4–3 p)	Maikel 77'	Third round	Nardo (D2); A 4–1	Rashani 30', de Lanlay 37', Bjørdal 66', Svensson 86'
Brattvåg (D2); H 1–0	Güven 72'	Fourth round	Nest-Sotra (D2); H 3–1	Midtsjø 6', Vilhjálmsson 9', Helland 90+1'
Sandefjord (D1); H 2–1	Ellingsen 8', Güven 70'	Quarter-final	Tromsø (TL); A 1–1 (5–3 p)	Gytkjær 90'
Strømsgodset (TL); A 2–1	Pålerud 55', Røyrane 73'	Semi-final	Bodø/Glimt (TL); H 2–0	Midtsjø 22', Skjelvik 90'

- (TL) = Tippeligaen team
- (D1) = 1. divisjon team
- (D2) = 2. divisjon team
- (D3) = 3. divisjon team
- (D4) = 4. divisjon team

== Match ==
=== Details ===
20 November 2016
13:15 CET (UTC+1)

Kongsvinger (2)	0–4	(1) Rosenborg
	Report	Helland 12', 63', 65'; Reginiussen 50'

Ullevaal Stadion, Oslo
Attendance: 26,912
Referee: Tore Hansen (Feda)

Kongsvinger	Rosenborg

Kongsvinger:
GK	1	(Finland) Otto Fredrikson
RB	2	(Norway) Fredrik Pålerud
CB	4	(Norway) Adrian Ovlien
CB	15	(Russia) Kirill Suslov	(yellow card) 53'	(substituted off) 71'
LB	3	(Norway) Jørgen Richardsen
RM	20	(Norway) Ørjan Røyrane	(yellow card) 61'
CM	8	(Norway) Martin Ellingsen
CM	16	(Norway) Harald Holter	(yellow card) 31'	(substituted off) 68'
LM	17	(Portugal) Hélio Pinto
CF	9	(Norway) Adem Güven (c)	(substituted off) 66'
CF	11	(Spain) Maikel
Substitutions:
GK	23	(Spain) Dani Mederos
DF	5	(Norway) Christian Røer
MF	6	(Sweden) Johan Vennberg	(substituted on) 68'
DF	7	(Australia) Dylan Murnane
DF	10	(Norway) Espen Nystuen	(substituted on) 71'
FW	19	(Senegal) Mame Niang	(substituted on) 66'	(yellow card) 85'
MF	21	(Norway) Simen Stølen
Head Coach:
(Portugal) Luís Pimenta

Rosenborg:
GK	1	(Norway) André Hansen
RB	2	(Norway) Jonas Svensson
CB	4	(Norway) Tore Reginiussen
CB	5	(Iceland) Hólmar Örn Eyjólfsson
LB	16	(Norway) Jørgen Skjelvik
RM	7	(Denmark) Mike Jensen (c)
CM	8	(Norway) Anders Konradsen
LM	21	(Norway) Fredrik Midtsjø	(substituted off) 80'
RW	23	(Norway) Pål André Helland	(substituted off) 82'
CF	9	(Denmark) Christian Gytkjær
LW	27	(Norway) Mushaga Bakenga	(substituted off) 70'
Substitutions:
GK	24	(Ghana) Adam Larsen Kwarasey
FW	10	(Iceland) Matthías Vilhjálmsson	(substituted on) 80'
DF	14	(Norway) Johan Lædre Bjørdal
FW	15	(Kosovo) Elbasan Rashani	(substituted on) 70'
MF	18	(Norway) Magnus Stamnestrø
DF	20	(Australia) Alex Gersbach	(substituted on) 82'
MF	28	(Iceland) Guðmundur Þórarinsson
Head Coach:
(Norway) Kåre Ingebrigtsen

MATCH OFFICIALS

- Assistant referees:
  - Jon-Michael Knutsen (Løvenstad FK)
  - Øystein Simon Ytterland (IL Valder)
- Fourth official: Espen Andreas Eskås (Bækkelagets SK)

MATCH RULES

- 90 minutes.
- 30 minutes of extra-time if necessary.
- Penalty shoot-out if scores still level.
- Seven named substitutes.
- Maximum of three substitutions.

== See also ==
- 2016 Norwegian Football Cup
- 2016 Tippeligaen
- 2016 1. divisjon
- 2016 in Norwegian football
