= 2016 in Norwegian football =

Football in Norway
- Season: 2016

Men's football
- Tippeligaen: Rosenborg
- 1. divisjon: Kristiansund BK
- 2. divisjon: Skeid (Group 1); Elverum (Group 2); Florø (Group 3); Arendal (Group 4)
- Cupen: Rosenborg

Women's football
- Toppserien: LSK Kvinner
- 1. divisjon: Grand Bodø
- Cupen: LSK Kvinner

The 2016 season was the 111th season of competitive football in Norway.

The season began in March, and ended in December with the 2016 Norwegian Football Cup Final.

== Men's football ==
=== Promotion and relegation ===
Teams promoted to Tippeligaen

- Sogndal
- Brann

Teams relegated from Tippeligaen

- Mjøndalen
- Sandefjord

=== League season ===
==== Eliteserien ====
Pos	Team	Pld	W	D	L	GF	GA	GD	Pts	Qualification or relegation
1	Rosenborg (C)	30	21	6	3	65	25	+40	69	Qualification for the Champions League second qualifying round (Note: Rosenborg qualified for the Europa League second qualifying round by winning the 2016 Norwegian Cup. However, since they already qualified for European competition based on their league position, the spot awarded to the cup winners was passed down the league.)
2	Brann	30	16	6	8	42	27	+15	54	Qualification for the Europa League second qualifying round
3	Odd	30	15	6	9	44	35	+9	51	Qualification for the Europa League first qualifying round
4	Haugesund	30	12	10	8	47	43	+4	46	Qualification for the Europa League first qualifying round
5	Molde	30	13	6	11	48	42	+6	45	
6	Sarpsborg 08	30	12	9	9	35	37	−2	45	
7	Strømsgodset	30	12	8	10	44	40	+4	44	
8	Viking	30	12	7	11	33	35	−2	43	
9	Aalesund	30	12	6	12	46	51	−5	42	
10	Vålerenga	30	10	8	12	41	39	+2	38	
11	Sogndal	30	8	12	10	33	37	−4	36	
12	Lillestrøm	30	8	10	12	45	50	−5	34	
13	Tromsø	30	9	7	14	36	46	−10	34	
14	Stabæk (O)	30	8	7	15	35	42	−7	31	Qualification for the relegation play-offs
15	Bodø/Glimt (R)	30	8	6	16	36	45	−9	30	Relegation to First Division
16	Start (R)	30	2	10	18	23	59	−36	16	Relegation to First Division

Source: Football Association of Norway (in Norwegian), Soccerway
Rules for classification: 1) Points; 2) Goal difference; 3) Goals scored; 4) Head-to-head points; 5) Head-to-head goal difference; 6) Head-to-head away goals scored (between two teams).
(C) Champions; (O) Play-off winners; (R) Relegated

==== 1. divisjon ====
Pos	Team	Pld	W	D	L	GF	GA	GD	Pts	Promotion, qualification or relegation
1	Kristiansund (C, P)	30	19	5	6	47	30	+17	62	Promotion to Eliteserien
2	Sandefjord (P)	30	18	5	7	54	35	+19	59	Promotion to Eliteserien
3	Jerv	30	15	8	7	47	34	+13	53	Qualification for the promotion play-offs
4	Sandnes Ulf	30	15	6	9	55	28	+27	51	Qualification for the promotion play-offs
5	Kongsvinger	30	14	7	9	56	42	+14	49	Qualification for the promotion play-offs
6	Mjøndalen	30	13	10	7	49	38	+11	49	Qualification for the promotion play-offs
7	Strømmen	30	13	8	9	46	45	+1	47	
8	Levanger	30	13	6	11	52	46	+6	45	
9	Ranheim	30	11	6	13	45	48	−3	39	
10	Åsane	30	10	8	12	36	37	−1	38	
11	Fredrikstad	30	8	9	13	34	48	−14	33	
12	Ull/Kisa	30	8	8	14	47	50	−3	32	
13	Bryne (R)	30	7	9	14	33	48	−15	30	Relegation to Second Division
14	Hødd (R)	30	8	6	16	31	57	−26	30	Relegation to Second Division
15	KFUM Oslo (R)	30	6	8	16	31	48	−17	26	Relegation to Second Division
16	Raufoss (R)	30	6	3	21	33	62	−29	21	Relegation to Second Division

Source: nifs.no (in Norwegian), Soccerway
Rules for classification: 1) Points; 2) Goal difference; 3) Goals scored; 4) Head-to-head points; 5) Head-to-head goal difference; 6) Head-to-head away goals scored (only if between two teams); 7) Head-to-head goals scored; 8) Play-off (only used to decide champions or relegation).
(C) Champions; (P) Promoted; (R) Relegated

==== 2. divisjon ====
===== Group 1 =====
Pos	Team	Pld	W	D	L	GF	GA	GD	Pts	Promotion or relegation
1	Tromsdalen (P)	26	21	4	1	71	19	+52	67	Promotion to First Division
2	Finnsnes	26	16	8	2	52	22	+30	56	
3	Skeid	26	15	7	4	57	29	+28	52	
4	Grorud	26	15	6	5	63	39	+24	51	
5	Follo	26	12	5	9	48	39	+9	41	
6	Kjelsås	26	11	8	7	38	34	+4	41	
7	Alta	26	12	4	10	58	44	+14	40	
8	Harstad (R)	26	8	7	11	45	51	−6	31	Relegation to Third Division
9	Senja (R)	26	7	8	11	34	41	−7	29	Relegation to Third Division
10	Oppsal (R)	26	8	5	13	36	53	−17	29	Relegation to Third Division
11	Stabæk 2 (R)	26	7	4	15	37	54	−17	25	Relegation to Third Division
12	Ullern (R)	26	4	6	16	28	51	−23	18	Relegation to Third Division
13	Tromsø 2 (R)	26	5	3	18	40	68	−28	18	Relegation to Third Division
14	Mo (R)	26	3	1	22	31	94	−63	10	Relegation to Third Division

Source: nifs.no; nrksport.no
Rules for classification: 1) points; 2) goal difference; 3) number of goals scored.
(P) Promoted; (R) Relegated

===== Group 2 =====
Pos	Team	Pld	W	D	L	GF	GA	GD	Pts	Promotion or relegation
1	Elverum (P)	26	20	4	2	68	13	+55	64	Promotion to First Division
2	HamKam	26	16	8	2	63	27	+36	56	
3	Hønefoss	26	12	6	8	49	35	+14	42	
4	Brumunddal	26	12	6	8	32	33	−1	42	
5	Nybergsund-Trysil	26	11	7	8	52	45	+7	40	
6	Byåsen	26	12	4	10	44	49	−5	40	
7	Nardo	26	11	6	9	28	36	−8	39	
8	Stjørdals-Blink (R)	26	12	2	12	53	40	+13	38	Relegation to Third Division
9	Brattvåg (R)	26	11	5	10	41	37	+4	38	Relegation to Third Division
10	Strindheim (R)	26	8	6	12	50	60	−10	30	Relegation to Third Division
11	Gjøvik-Lyn (R)	26	7	7	12	27	44	−17	28	Relegation to Third Division
12	Molde 2 (R)	26	6	7	13	42	49	−7	25	Relegation to Third Division
13	Rosenborg 2 (R)	26	6	2	18	31	66	−35	20	Relegation to Third Division
14	Tynset (R)	26	1	4	21	19	65	−46	7	Relegation to Third Division

Source: nifs.no; nrksport.no
Rules for classification: 1) points; 2) goal difference; 3) number of goals scored.
(P) Promoted; (R) Relegated

===== Group 3 =====
Pos	Team	Pld	W	D	L	GF	GA	GD	Pts	Promotion or relegation
1	Florø (P)	26	21	4	1	78	22	+56	67	Promotion to First Division
2	Nest-Sotra	26	19	4	3	83	26	+57	61	
3	Egersund	26	13	4	9	48	28	+20	43	
4	Vard Haugesund	26	11	7	8	46	34	+12	40	
5	Fana	26	10	9	7	35	29	+6	39	
6	Vålerenga 2	26	11	6	9	48	45	+3	39	
7	Vidar	26	12	3	11	55	60	−5	39	
8	Fyllingsdalen (R)	26	9	8	9	46	38	+8	35	Relegation to Third Division
9	Lysekloster (R)	26	10	0	16	40	61	−21	30	Relegation to Third Division
10	Lørenskog (R)	26	8	4	14	41	49	−8	28	Relegation to Third Division
11	Frigg (R)	26	7	5	14	37	62	−25	26	Relegation to Third Division
12	Stord (R)	26	6	6	14	36	65	−29	24	Relegation to Third Division
13	Sola (R)	26	6	3	17	27	60	−33	21	Relegation to Third Division
14	Førde (R)	26	4	7	15	29	70	−41	19	Relegation to Third Division

Source: nifs.no; nrksport.no
Rules for classification: 1) points; 2) goal difference; 3) number of goals scored.
(P) Promoted; (R) Relegated

===== Group 4 =====
Pos	Team	Pld	W	D	L	GF	GA	GD	Pts	Promotion or relegation
1	Arendal (P)	26	19	6	1	75	24	+51	63	Promotion to First Division
2	Bærum	26	14	5	7	55	42	+13	47	
3	Notodden	26	13	6	7	55	35	+20	45	
4	Vindbjart	26	14	2	10	67	50	+17	44	
5	Asker	26	13	4	9	52	44	+8	43	
6	Fram Larvik	26	13	2	11	58	46	+12	41	
7	Odd 2	26	12	5	9	56	51	+5	41	
8	Strømsgodset 2 (R)	26	11	4	11	50	58	−8	37	Relegation to Third Division
9	Kvik Halden (R)	26	10	6	10	47	50	−3	36	Relegation to Third Division
10	Tønsberg (R)	26	10	6	10	38	41	−3	36	Relegation to Third Division
11	Moss (R)	26	9	8	9	57	55	+2	35	Relegation to Third Division
12	Pors Fotball (R)	26	9	2	15	44	71	−27	29	Relegation to Third Division
13	Ørn-Horten (R)	26	3	2	21	28	78	−50	11	Relegation to Third Division
14	Fløy (R)	26	3	0	23	37	74	−37	9	Relegation to Third Division

Source: nifs.no; nrksport.no
Rules for classification: 1) points; 2) goal difference; 3) number of goals scored.
(P) Promoted; (R) Relegated

=== Norwegian Cup ===
==== Final ====
20 November 2016
13:15 CET (UTC+1)

Kongsvinger (2)	0–4	(1) Rosenborg
	Report	Helland 12', 63', 65'; Reginiussen 50'

Ullevaal Stadion, Oslo
Attendance: 26,912
Referee: Tore Hansen (Feda)

== Women's football ==
=== Promotion and relegation ===
Teams promoted to Toppserien

- Urædd

Teams relegated from Toppserien

- Amazon Grimstad

=== League season ===
==== Toppserien ====
Pos	Team	Pld	W	D	L	GF	GA	GD	Pts	Qualification or relegation
1	LSK Kvinner (C)	22	19	3	0	88	10	+78	60	Qualification for the Champions League round of 32
2	Avaldsnes	22	18	2	2	50	17	+33	56	Qualification for the Champions League qualifying round
3	Stabæk	22	12	6	4	39	17	+22	42	
4	Kolbotn	22	12	4	6	32	17	+15	40	
5	Røa	22	9	6	7	34	31	+3	33	
6	Sandviken	22	7	6	9	29	28	+1	27	
7	Trondheims-Ørn	22	7	6	9	34	41	−7	27	
8	Arna-Bjørnar	22	7	4	11	22	38	−16	25	
9	Vålerenga	22	6	5	11	25	48	−23	23	
10	Klepp	22	6	2	14	32	49	−17	20	
11	Medkila (O)	22	2	5	15	21	50	−29	11	Qualification for the relegation play-offs
12	Urædd (R)	22	1	3	18	12	72	−60	6	Relegation to First Division

Source: NIFS
Rules for classification: 1) Points; 2) Goal difference; 3) Number of goals scored; 4) Head-to-head points; 5) Head-to-head goal difference; 6) Head-to-head away goals scored
(C) Champions; (O) Play-off winners; (R) Relegated

=== Norwegian Women's Cup ===
==== Final ====
- LSK Kvinner 2–0 Røa

== National teams ==
=== Norway men's national football team ===
24 March 2016 Exhibition game	Estonia	0–0	Norway	Tallinn, Estonia
19:00 (UTC+2)		Report		Stadium: A. Le Coq Arena; Attendance: 2,892; Referee: Andrew Dallas (Scotland)

29 March 2016 Exhibition game	Norway	2–0	Finland	Oslo, Norway
20:00 (UTC+2)	Berget 57'; Johansen 84'	Report (NFF)		Stadium: Ullevaal Stadion; Attendance: 4,675; Referee: Neil Doyle (Republic of Ireland)

29 May 2016 Exhibition game	Portugal	3–0	Norway	Porto, Portugal
20:45 (UTC+1)	Quaresma 13'; Guerreiro 65'; Eder 70'	Report		Stadium: Estádio do Dragão; Attendance: 34,275; Referee: Padraig Sutton (Northern Ireland)

1 June 2016 Exhibition game	Norway	3–2	Iceland	Oslo, Norway
19:45 (UTC+2)	Johansen 1'; Helland 41'; Sørloth 67'	Report (NFF)	Ingason 36'; G. Sigurðsson 81' (pen.)	Stadium: Ullevaal Stadion; Attendance: 9,568; Referee: Kevin Clancy (Scotland)

5 June 2016 Exhibition game	Belgium	3–2	Norway	Brussels, Belgium
18:00 (UTC+2)	Lukaku 3'; Hazard 70'; Ciman 74'	Report	King 21'; Berisha 48'	Stadium: King Baudouin Stadium; Attendance: 42,196; Referee: Tobias Stieler (German)

31 August 2016 Exhibition game	Norway	0–1	Belarus	Oslo, Norway
19:30 (UTC+2)		Report	Kryvets 57'	Stadium: Ullevaal Stadion; Attendance: 7,180; Referee: Jacob Bille (Denmark)

4 September 2016 2018 FIFA World Cup qualification	Norway	0–3	Germany	Oslo, Norway
20:45 (UTC+2)		Report (FIFA); Report (UEFA)	Müller 16', 60'; Kimmich 45'	Stadium: Ullevaal Stadion; Attendance: 26,793; Referee: Willie Collum (Scotland)

8 October 2016 2018 FIFA World Cup qualification	Azerbaijan	1–0	Norway	Baku, Azerbaijan
20:00 (UTC+4)	Medvedev 11'	Report (FIFA); Report (UEFA)		Stadium: Olympic Stadium; Attendance: 35,000; Referee: Liran Liany (Israel)

11 October 2016 2018 FIFA World Cup qualification	Norway	4–1	San Marino	Oslo, Norway
20:45 (UTC+2)	D. Simoncini 12' (o.g.); Diomande 77'; Samuelsen 82'; King 83'	Report (FIFA); Report (UEFA)	Stefanelli 54'	Stadium: Ullevaal Stadion; Attendance: 8,214; Referee: Benoît Bastien (France)

11 November 2016 2018 FIFA World Cup qualification	Czech Republic	2–1	Norway	Prague, Czechia
20:45 (UTC+1)	Krmenčík 11'; Zmrhal 47'	Report (FIFA); Report (UEFA)	King 87'	Stadium: Eden Arena; Attendance: 16,411; Referee: Bas Nijhuis (Netherlands)
