= 2017 Mesterfinalen =

Brann	Rosenborg
0	2
- Date: 29 March 2017
- Venue: Brann Stadion, Bergen
- Referee: Svein Oddvar Moen (SK Haugar)
- Attendance: 10,681

The 2017 Mesterfinalen was the first edition of Mesterfinalen and the 3rd Norwegian super cup overall. Mesterfinalen is an annual game between the League champions and the Cup champions, or the League number two if, as with the 2017 final, the same team are reigning League and Cup champions. Rosenborg are reigning League and Cup champions while Brann are silver medalist from the 2016 season. The match was played at Brann Stadion in Bergen 29 March.

== Match details ==
29 March 2017
19:00 CEST

Brann	0–2	Rosenborg
	Report	Jevtović 32'; Reginiussen 90+4'

Brann Stadion, Bergen
Attendance: 10,681
Referee: Svein Oddvar Moen (Haugar)

Brann	Rosenborg

BRANN:
GK	24	(Poland) Piotr Leciejewski
RB	17	(Faroe Islands) Gilli Rólantsson		(substituted off) 83'
CB	5	(Norway) Jonas Grønner
CB	15	(Costa Rica) Bismar Acosta	(yellow card) 88'
LB	21	(Norway) Ruben Kristiansen
CM	8	(Norway) Fredrik Haugen
CM	23	(Norway) Sivert Heltne Nilsen
CM	29	(Norway) Kristoffer Barmen
RW	19	(Costa Rica) Deyver Vega	(yellow card) 43'	(substituted off) 63'
CF	10	(Sweden) Jakob Orlov (c)		(substituted off) 63'
LW	25	(Norway) Daniel Braaten		(substituted off) 63'
Substitutes:
GK	1	(United States) Alex Horwath
DF	18	(Norway) Azar Karadas		(substituted on) 83'
DF	33	(Norway) Amin Nouri		(substituted on) 63'
MF	9	(Norway) Kasper Skaanes
MF	20	(Norway) Halldor Stenevik
FW	11	(Norway) Steffen Lie Skålevik		(substituted on) 63'
FW	22	(Norway) Torgeir Børven		(substituted on) 63'
Manager:
(Norway) Lars Arne Nilsen

ROSENBORG:
GK	1	(Norway) André Hansen
RB	2	(Norway) Vegar Eggen Hedenstad
CB	14	(Norway) Johan Lædre Bjørdal
CB	5	(Denmark) Jacob Rasmussen	(yellow card) 43'
LB	20	(Australia) Alex Gersbach
DM	7	(Denmark) Mike Jensen (c)	(yellow card) 48'
DM	8	(Norway) Anders Konradsen		(substituted off) 88'
AM	21	(Norway) Fredrik Midtsjø		(substituted off) 62'
RW	17	(Kosovo) Elbasan Rashani		(substituted off) 62'
LW	26	(Serbia) Milan Jevtović		(substituted off) 62'
CF	10	(Iceland) Matthías Vilhjálmsson
Substitutes:
GK	24	(Norway) Arild Østbø
DF	4	(Norway) Tore Reginiussen		(substituted on) 88'
DF	16	(Norway) Jørgen Skjelvik
MF	23	(Norway) Pål André Helland		(substituted on) 62'
MF	25	(Norway) Marius Lundemo
FW	9	(Denmark) Nicklas Bendtner		(substituted on) 62'
FW	27	(Norway) Mushaga Bakenga	(yellow card) 84'	(substituted on) 62'
Manager:
(Norway) Kåre Ingebrigtsen

MATCH OFFICIALS

- Assistant referees:
  - Kim Tomas Haglund (Navestad IF)
  - Magnus Lundberg (Ringsaker IF)
- Fourth official: Kai Erik Steen (IL Gneist)

MATCH RULES

- 90 minutes
- Penalty shoot-out if scores level after 90 minutes
- Seven named substitutes
- Maximum of five substitutions
