= Jon André Røyrane =

Norwegian footballer (born 1983)

Personal information
- Date of birth: 12 December 1983 (age 42)
- Place of birth: Norheimsund, Norway
- Height: 1.74 m (5 ft 9 in)
- Position: Midfielder

Team information
- Current team: Stord IL

Senior career*
Years	Team	Apps	(Gls)
–2005	Norheimsund		
2006–2007	Sandefjord		
2008–2009	Løv-Ham		
2008	→ Åsane (loan)		
2010	Lyn	9	(0)
2010–2011	Kristiansund	2	(0)
2012–2013	UMF Selfoss	22	(5)
2013	Fram	5	(0)
2014–	Stord		
- * Club domestic league appearances and goals as of 28 September 2013

Jon André Røyrane (born 12 December 1983) is a Norwegian footballer.

Røyrane was born in Norheimsund and grew up in Kvinnherad Municipality and started his senior career for Norheimsund IL. After the 2005 season he signed for Sandefjord Fotball together with his younger brother Ørjan. He was sold to Løv-Ham Fotball after the 2007 season. He was loaned out to Åsane Fotball in parts of 2008.

After playing for Løv-Ham in Adeccoligaen in 2009, Røyrane joined Lyn ahead of the 2010 season, but left for Kristiansund when Lyn was bankrupted halfway through the season.

Ahead of the 2012 season, Røyrane joined UMF Selfoss, and became the fourth Norwegian in the Icelandic club. On 10 May 2012, Røyrane scored his first goal for Selfoss against Valur where he showed great technique and skills.

Røyrane signed for Fram Reykjavik in the summer of 2013, but left the club when the season ended. He went back to Norway and played for Stord IL. Currently he is assistant coach in Stord.
