= Adrian Lillebekk Ovlien =

Norwegian footballer (1997–2018)

Personal information
- Full name: Adrian Lillebekk Ovlien
- Date of birth: 3 August 1997
- Place of birth: Eidskog, Norway
- Date of death: 16 March 2018 (aged 20)
- Place of death: Oslo, Norway
- Height: 1.82 m (5 ft 11 1/2 in)
- Position: Central defender

Youth career
- Eidskog

Senior career*
Years	Team	Apps	(Gls)
2012	Eidskog	16	(0)
2013–2017	Kongsvinger	102	(4)
Total		118	(4)

International career
2012	Norway U15	6	(0)
2013	Norway U16	14	(0)
2014	Norway U17	12	(0)
2014–2015	Norway U18	14	(0)
2015–2016	Norway U19	4	(0)
- * Club domestic league appearances and goals

Adrian Lillebekk Ovlien (3 August 1997 – 16 March 2018) was a Norwegian footballer who played as a central defender for Kongsvinger. He played more than 100 competitive first-team matches for Kongsvinger, including the 2016 Norwegian Cup Final. He was also capped a total of 50 times by Norway on various youth levels from U15 to U19.

== Club career ==
Lillebekk Ovlien grew up in Eidskog Municipality, and made his senior debut for local third division side Eidskog Fotball in 2012 as a 14-year-old. He played 16 league matches for Eidskog before joining the Glåmdal region's biggest side Kongsvinger ahead of the 2013 season. He made his debut in the Norwegian First Division on 5 May 2013 as a substitute against Fredrikstad, aged 15 years and 275 days. He is the youngest player to have ever played for Kongsvinger's first team in a competitive match.

Lillebekk Ovlien played regularly for Kongsvinger over the next five years, playing a total of 114 competitive matches for the first team, scoring five goals. This includes 62 matches (two goals) in the Norwegian First Division. He also played all seven matches when Kongsvinger, as a club first, reached the final of the Norwegian Cup in 2016. He started in the final against Rosenborg, where Kongsvinger lost by a score of 4–0.

Despite interest from clubs in Eliteserien, Lillebekk Ovlien decided to sign a new contract with Kongsvinger in the autumn of 2017, stating: "KIL is a safe place for me, and I feel this is the place where I can develop the most. I am allowed to try and fail at this club. It would also be nice if KIL got a transfer fee for us the day we join another club," after he and his teammate Harald Holter had extended their contracts.

== International career ==
Lillebekk Ovlien debuted on the international level when he was selected for Norway's Under-15 team in a match against Sweden on 18 September 2012. Lillebekk Ovlien appeared in 50 international games on youth level. His final international was an Under-19 match against Portugal on 15 February 2016.

== Death ==
Lillebekk Ovlien died suddenly on the morning of 16 March 2018, aged 20. He had played in a pre-season friendly against Chinese side Sichuan Longfor four days earlier in La Manga, Spain. According to a press release from the club, he died as a result of an acute infection which likely caused septic shock. Sports director Espen Nystuen said "This is the saddest day in KIL's history." A tribute to Lillebekk Ovlien was held at the international friendly between Norway and Australia on 23 March.

== Career statistics ==
Club	Season	Division	League		Cup		Total	
Club	Season	Division	Apps	Goals	Apps	Goals	Apps	Goals
2012	Eidskog Fotball	3rd Division	16	0	1	0	17	0
2013	Kongsvinger IL	First Division	8	0	0	0	8	0
2014	Kongsvinger IL	2nd Division	21	1	2	1	23	2
2015	Kongsvinger IL	2nd Division	18	1	0	0	18	1
2016	Kongsvinger IL	First Division	26	1	7	0	33	1
2017	Kongsvinger IL	First Division	29	1	3	0	32	1
Career Total			118	4	13	1	131	5
