= Joachim Magnussen =

Norwegian footballer (born 1987)

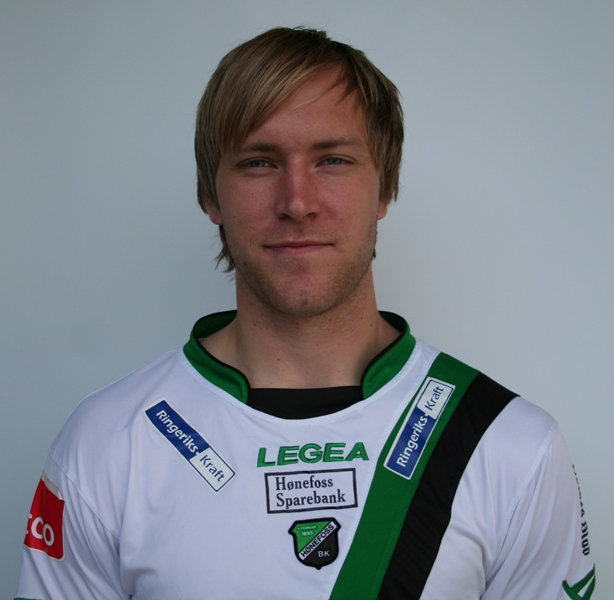

Personal information
- Full name: Joachim Magnussen
- Date of birth: 18 July 1987 (age 39)
- Place of birth: Ålesund, Norway
- Height: 1.94 m (6 ft 4 in)
- Position: Forward

Team information
- Current team: Hødd
- Number: 10

Senior career*
Years	Team	Apps	(Gls)
–2010	Hødd		
2011–2012	Hønefoss	40	(6)
2013–	Hødd	90	(10)
- * Club domestic league appearances and goals as of 25 November 2016

Joachim Magnussen (born 18 July 1987) is a Norwegian footballer who plays as a forward for Hødd in the First Division. He has previously played for Hønefoss in Tippeligaen.

Ahead of the 2013 season, Magnussen returned to Hødd after playing for Hønefoss for two seasons.

== Career statistics ==
Club	Season	Division	League		Cup		Total	
Club	Season	Division	Apps	Goals	Apps	Goals	Apps	Goals
2006	Hødd	Adeccoligaen	12	1	0	0	12	1
2007	Hødd	2. divisjon						
2008	Hødd	Adeccoligaen	28	5	1	2	29	7
2009	Hødd	2. divisjon						
2010	Hødd	2. divisjon						
2011	Hønefoss	Adeccoligaen	27	6	3	0	30	6
2012	Hønefoss	Tippeligaen	13	0	2	1	15	1
2013	Hødd	Adeccoligaen	24	3	1	0	25	3
2014	Hødd	1. divisjon	21	3	1	0	22	3
2015	Hødd	OBOS-ligaen	20	1	3	0	23	1
2016	Hødd	OBOS-ligaen	25	3	2	3	27	6
Career Total			170	22	13	6	183	28
