= Pål André Helland =

Norwegian footballer (born 1990)

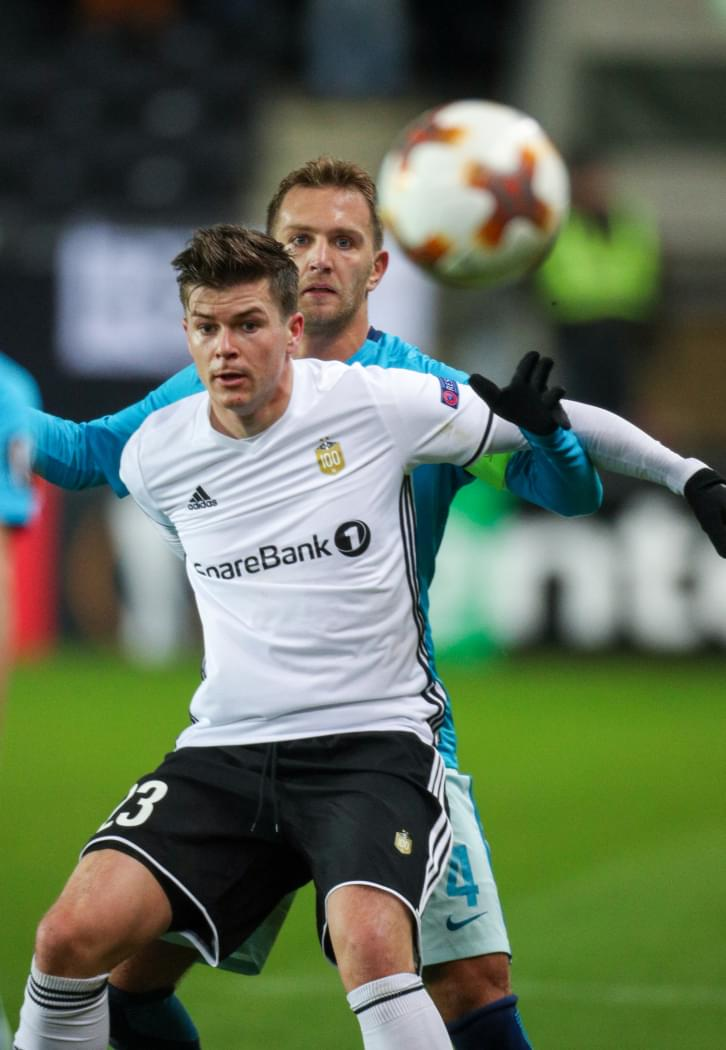
- Helland in 2017

Personal information
- Full name: Pål André Helland
- Date of birth: 4 January 1990 (age 36)
- Place of birth: Kyrksæterøra, Hemne, Norway
- Height: 1.86 m (6 ft 1 in)
- Position: Winger

Team information
- Current team: Ranheim (co-coach)

Youth career
- –2006: KIL/Hemne
- 2006–2008: Rosenborg

Senior career*
Years	Team	Apps	(Gls)
2009–2011	Rosenborg	2	(0)
2009–2010	→ Ranheim (loan)	2	(2)
2011	→ Ranheim (loan)	5	(0)
2011	Byåsen	11	(10)
2012–2013	Hødd	39	(11)
2013–2021	Rosenborg	153	(39)
2021–2022	Lillestrøm	28	(3)
2023	Løvenstad	7	(2)
2024	KIL/Hemne	5	(5)
Total		252	(72)

International career^{‡}
2005	Norway U15	1	(0)
2007	Norway U17	8	(3)
2008	Norway U18	8	(2)
2009	Norway U19	3	(1)
2015–2016	Norway	6	(1)

Managerial career
- 2023: Lillestrøm U19
- 2025–: Ranheim
- * Club domestic league appearances and goals as of 12 October 2024 ‡ National team caps and goals as of 8 October 2016

Pål André Helland (born 4 January 1990) is a former Norwegian professional footballer, and current co-coach of Ranheim.

A prolific winger, Helland played for both Rosenborg and Lillestrøm in Eliteserien. Helland was also part of the Hødd team that won the 2012 Norwegian Football Cup Final. He played several games for Norway's different youth teams, and was capped six times for the senior team.

== Career ==
=== Rosenborg ===
Helland came through the ranks at Rosenborg before the 2009 season of the Norwegian top division, when he signed with them a three-year professional contract. He had been part of the youth setup at Rosenborg since summer 2006 and shortly after transfer made his debut with their B team against Molde FK. He continued on B team during the 2007 season and received the captains armband for impressive displays. He got his first minutes for the first team squad in pre-season 2008 in a friendly against FK Bodø-Glimt as a central defender. Although he plays best as a winger, Helland can play in various positions in the midfield and defence.

=== Hødd ===
He left Rosenborg in August 2011 when his contract was not renewed. With lower division IL Hødd, they won the 2012 Norwegian Football Cup, last done fifteen years earlier.

=== Return to Rosenborg ===
In July 2013 he signed a contract with Rosenborg, that originally started as of 1 January 2014, after his contract would expire. On 10 July 2013, however, Rosenborg and Hødd agreed on a deal in the summer transfer window. He joined Rosenborg on 26 July 2013. On 20 November 2016, Helland scored a hat-trick as Rosenborg defeated Kongsvinger 4–0 in the 2016 Norwegian Football Cup final.

=== Lillestrøm ===
After eight seasons at Rosenborg, Helland moved to fellow Eliteserien side Lillestrøm, but because of injuries, only started four games, and only played 340 minutes of Eliteserien football in his first season.

In November 2022, Helland decided to retire after two seasons at Lillestrøm. He cited his body not being able to handle the physique needed to play at the top anymore.

=== Løvenstad ===
Only a couple mounts after retiring from football, Helland returned to play for the amateur club Løvenstad in the Norwegian 4. divisjon.

=== Return to KIL/Hemne ===
After one year at Løvenstad, Helland returned to his boyhood club KIL/Hemne ahead of the 2024 season, again playing in the 4. divisjon.

== International career ==
In 2005 Helland got his first international match, playing for Norway's U15 team. He subsequently made appearances for Norway's U17, U18, and U19 team.

Helland's first senior game came against Sweden in June 2015, replacing Håvard Nielsen in the 69th minute. His first start for Norway came against Iceland in a friendly game, where he also scored his first and only international senior goal.

== Coaching career ==
After his professional retirement, Helland once again joined Lillestrøm, this time as a coach for their U19 squad.

Ahead of the 2024 season, Helland joined Kåre Ingebrigtsen's coaching team in Ranheim as a player developer. When Ingebrigtsen announced he was stepping down as head coach for the club after the season, the club announced that Christian Eggen Rismark would take over as head coach, with Helland filling in the role as co-coach.

== Media career ==
In September 2021 Viaplay announced that Helland would join them as their newest football pundit. In the beginning he covered the European competitions Viaplay had the rights to, before moving over to covering Premier League games when the streamer acquired the rights before the 2022–23 season.

In 2024, Helland was one of the contestants of the Norwegian television program Mesternes Mester.

== Career statistics ==
=== Club ===
As of match played 12 October 2024

Appearances and goals by club, season and competition
Club	Season	League			National Cup		Europe		Other		Total	
Club	Season	Division	Apps	Goals	Apps	Goals	Apps	Goals	Apps	Goals	Apps	Goals
Rosenborg	2009	Eliteserien	1	0	3	1	—		—		4	1
Rosenborg	2010	Eliteserien	1	0	0	0	—		—		1	0
Rosenborg	Total		2	0	3	1	—		—		5	1
Ranheim (loan)	2009	2. divisjon	2	2	0	0	—		—		2	2
Ranheim (loan)	2010	1. divisjon	3	0	1	0	—		—		4	0
Ranheim (loan)	2011	1. divisjon	2	0	1	0	—		—		3	0
Ranheim (loan)	Total		7	2	2	0	—		—		9	2
Byåsen	2011	2. divisjon	11	10	0	0	—		—		11	10
Hødd	2012	1. divisjon	26	10	7	6	—		—		33	16
Hødd	2013	1. divisjon	13	1	3	1	2 (Note: Appearances in UEFA Europa League)	0	—		18	2
Hødd	Total		39	11	10	7	2	0	—		51	18
Rosenborg	2013	Eliteserien	11	2	2	0	—		—		13	2
Rosenborg	2014	Eliteserien	21	4	2	2	4	2	—		27	8
Rosenborg	2015	Eliteserien	21	13	6	8	11	4	—		38	25
Rosenborg	2016	Eliteserien	20	4	5	4	6 (Note: Four appearances and one goal in UEFA Champions League, two appearances in UEFA Europa League)	1	—		31	9
Rosenborg	2017	Eliteserien	22	6	3	1	5 (Note: Two appearances in UEFA Champions League, three appearances and one goal in UEFA Europa League)	1	1 (Note: Appearance in Mesterfinalen)	0	31	8
Rosenborg	2018	Eliteserien	20	5	4	0	6 (Note: Three appearances in UEFA Champions League, three appearances in UEFA Europa League)	0	—		30	5
Rosenborg	2019	Eliteserien	19	3	2	0	9 (Note: Six appearances and two goals in UEFA Champions League, three appearances and one goal in UEFA Europa League)	3	—		30	6
Rosenborg	2020	Eliteserien	19	2	—		1	0	—		20	2
Rosenborg	Total		153	39	24	15	42	11	1	0	220	65
Lillestrøm	2021	Eliteserien	14	1	1	0	—		—		15	1
Lillestrøm	2022	Eliteserien	14	2	3	3	3 (Note: Appearances in UEFA Conference League)	0	—		20	5
Lillestrøm	Total		28	3	4	3	3	0	—		35	6
Løvenstad	2023	4. divisjon	7	2	0	0	—		—		7	2
KIL/Hemne	2024	4. divisjon	5	5	0	0	—		—		5	5
Career total			252	72	43	26	47	11	1	0	343	109

=== International ===
As of match played 8 October 2016

Appearances and goals by national team and year
National team	Year	Apps	Goals
Norway	2015	4	0
Norway	2016	2	1
Total		6	1

Norway score listed first, score column indicates score after each Helland goal.

List of international goals scored by Pål André Helland
No.	Date	Venue	Cap	Opponent	Score	Result	Competition
1	1 June 2016	Ullevaal Stadion, Oslo, Norway	5	Iceland	2–1	3–2	Friendly

== Honours ==
Hødd

- Norwegian Cup: 2012

Rosenborg

- Eliteserien: 2015, 2016, 2017, 2018
- Norwegian Cup: 2015, 2016, 2018
- Mesterfinalen: 2017
