= Maikel =

Maikel (/ˈmaɪkəl/) is a masculine given name. It is a form of Michael in the Caribbean, Netherlands, Spain, and Suriname, probably as a phonetic approximation of the English name. In the Netherlands, its first use was not until the mid-1950s and its popularity peaked in 1990. People with this name include:

- Maikel Aerts (born 1976), Dutch goalkeeper
- Maikel Benner (born 1980), Dutch baseball player
- Maikel Chang (born 1991), Cuban footballer
- Maikel Cleto (born 1989), Dominican baseball pitcher
- Maikel Folch (born 1980), Cuban baseball pitcher
- Maikel Franco (born 1992), Dominican baseball player
- Maikel García (born 2000), Venezuelan baseball player
- Maikel Hermann (born 1976), Spanish footballer
- Maikel Kieftenbeld (born 1990), Dutch footballer
- Maikel Mesa (born 1991), Spanish footballer
- Maikel Moreno (born 1965), Venezuelan judge
- Maikel Nabil Sanad (born 1985), Egyptian political activist living in the United States
- Maikel Nieves (born 1989), Spanish footballer
- Maikel Renfurm (born 1976), Suriname-born Dutch footballer
- Maikel Reyes (born 1993), Cuban footballer
- Maikel Scheffers (born 1982), Dutch wheelchair tennis player
- Maikel Verkoelen (born 1992), Dutch footballer
- Maikel van der Vleuten (born 1988), Dutch equestrian
- Maikel van der Werff (born 1989), Dutch footballer
