= Fredrik Mani Pålerud =

Norwegian footballer (born 1994)

Fredrik Pålerud
Personal information
- Full name: Fredrik Mani Pålerud
- Date of birth: 24 February 1994 (age 32)
- Height: 1.81 m (5 ft 11 in)
- Positions: Right-back; wing-back

Team information
- Current team: Start
- Number: 2

Youth career
- Disenå
- Oppstad
- Sander
- 2012–2013: Tromsø

Senior career*
Years	Team	Apps	(Gls)
2012	Sander	13	(2)
2012–2013	Tromsø 2	27	(1)
2014–2020	Kongsvinger	173	(5)
2021–2022	Sandnes Ulf	29	(1)
2022–2023	Sandefjord	27	(0)
2024–	Start	55	(1)
- * Club domestic league appearances and goals as of 8 July 2026

Fredrik Mani Pålerud (born 24 February 1994) is a Norwegian footballer who plays as a right back for IK Start.

== Career ==
He hails from Finnholt and played local youth football for Disenå, Oppstad and Sander IL. He made his senior debut for Sander in the 2012 3. divisjon before moving north in the summer, joining the academy of Tromsø IL. He was not given the chance for the senior team, and moved back to his home region in 2014, this time playing for Kongsvinger IL.

Pålerud became a regular in the right-back position. In 2016 the team was behind a major upset as they, a second-tier side, made it to the 2016 Norwegian Football Cup final. Pålerud scored the winning goal in the semi-final against Strømsgodset.

Needing new challenges, Pålerud moved to Western Norway in 2021 to play for fellow second-tier team Sandnes Ulf. In early August 2022 he left Sandnes Ulf as he was signed by Sandefjord Fotball. At the age of 28 Pålerud made his Eliteserien debut in August 2022 against Viking. Sandefjord would meet Kongsvinger in the relegation play-offs, winning the two-legged bout.

Pålerud did not find a new club in the 2023–24 transfer window, but trained with IK Start. As clubs were still allowed to sign free agents, he penned a contract in April 2024 lasting until the end of the year. It was extended for two more years. Winning promotion and returning for his second Eliteserien spell in 2026, Pålerud saw Start struggling in the bottom of the table.

== Personal life ==
Pålerud graduated in law in 2019. In 2026 he was hired as a part-time adviser in the law firm of IK Start's chairman.
