= Carl-Henrik Refvik =

Norwegian footballer (born 1995)

Personal information
- Full name: Carl-Henrik Sirevaag Refvik
- Date of birth: 13 March 1996 (age 30)
- Position: Forward

Team information
- Current team: Vidar
- Number: 14

Youth career
- Vidar
- Viking

Senior career*
Years	Team	Apps	(Gls)
2014–2015	Viking	1	(0)
2015–	Vidar	16	(7)
- * Club domestic league appearances and goals as of 27 March 2016

Carl-Henrik Sirevaag Refvik (born 2 January 1995) is a Norwegian football striker who currently plays for Vidar.

He made his league debut as a substitute against Rosenborg in August 2014.
