= Maikel Nieves =

Spanish footballer (born 1989)

Personal information
- Full name: Antonio Nieves Martín
- Date of birth: 2 December 1989 (age 36)
- Place of birth: Las Palmas, Spain
- Height: 1.82 m (6 ft 0 in)
- Position: Forward

Team information
- Current team: Råde

Youth career
- Yoñe
- Telde
- Las Palmas

Senior career*
| Years | Team | Apps | (Gls) |
| 2010–2011 | Las Palmas B | | |
| 2011–2012 | Vecindario | 27 | (3) |
| 2012–2013 | Rayo Cantabria | | |
| 2013–2014 | Vecindario | | |
| 2014 | Nybersgund | 23 | (15) |
| 2015–2017 | Kongsvinger | 73 | (27) |
| 2018 | Brommapojkarna | 20 | (0) |
| 2019–2021 | Fredrikstad | 62 | (11) |
| 2022– | Råde | 0 | (0) |
- * Club domestic league appearances and goals as of 5 January 2022

Antonio Nieves Martín (born 2 December 1989), commonly known as Maikel Nieves is a Spanish footballer who plays for Norwegian club Råde as a forward.

== Club career ==
Born in Las Palmas, Nieves started his youth career with the academy of CD Yoñe before passing through the youth setups of UD Telde and UD Las Palmas. Subsequently, he went to play for lower league clubs in his native country, representing UD Vecindario and Rayo Cantabria.

In April 2014, Nieves moved abroad for the first time and signed with Norwegian third-tier club Nybergsund IL-Trysil. In his first season abroad, he contributed with 16 goals ans 11 assists. He moved to Kongsvinger IL Toppfotball in December. He contributed with 11 goals in his first season with the club, with his team winning promotion to the second tier. He went on to play regularly with the club, and also featured for the side in the 2016 Norwegian Football Cup final. After amassing 85 caps and scoring 30 goals, Nieves left the club in December 2017.

On 8 January 2018, Nieves switched to Swedish Allsvenskan club IF Brommapojkarna. In January 2019, Nieves signed with Fredrikstad FK in the Norwegian 2. divisjon.

== Career statistics ==
As of match played on 16 September 2018

| Club | Season | League | | | Cup | | Other | | Total | |
| Club | Season | Division | Apps | Goals | Apps | Goals | Apps | Goals | Apps | Goals |
|---|---|---|---|---|---|---|---|---|---|---|
| Vexindario | 2011–12 | Segunda División B | 27 | 3 | 0 | 0 | — | | 27 | 3 |
| Nybersgund | 2014 | 2. divisjon | 23 | 15 | 2 | 1 | — | | 25 | 16 |
| Kongsvinger | 2015 | 2. divisjon | 23 | 10 | 3 | 1 | — | | 26 | 11 |
| Kongsvinger | 2016 | 1. divisjon | 25 | 8 | 5 | 1 | 2 (Note: Appearances in Promotion Play-offs) | 1 | 32 | 10 |
| Kongsvinger | 2017 | 1. divisjon | 25 | 9 | 2 | 0 | — | | 27 | 9 |
| Kongsvinger | Total | | 73 | 27 | 10 | 2 | 2 | 1 | 85 | 30 |
| Brommapojkarna | 2018 | Allsvenskan | 15 | 0 | 4 | 0 | — | | 19 | 0 |
| Career total | | | 138 | 45 | 16 | 3 | 2 | 1 | 156 | 49 |
