= Vestsiden-Askøy IL =

Norwegian football club

Vestsiden Askøy IL
- Full name: Vestsiden Askøy Idrettslag
- Ground: Ravnanger idrettspark, Ravnanger
- League: 5. Divisjon
Home colours

Vestsiden Askøy Idrettslag is a Norwegian association football club from the western part of Askøy Municipality.

The men's football team currently resides in the Fifth Division, the sixth tier of Norwegian football. It last played in the Third Division in 2010.

The team colors are black and white. Notable players include Torbjørn Kjerrgård, a former Norwegian Premier League player for SK Brann.
