= Milan Jevtović =

Serbian footballer (born 1993)

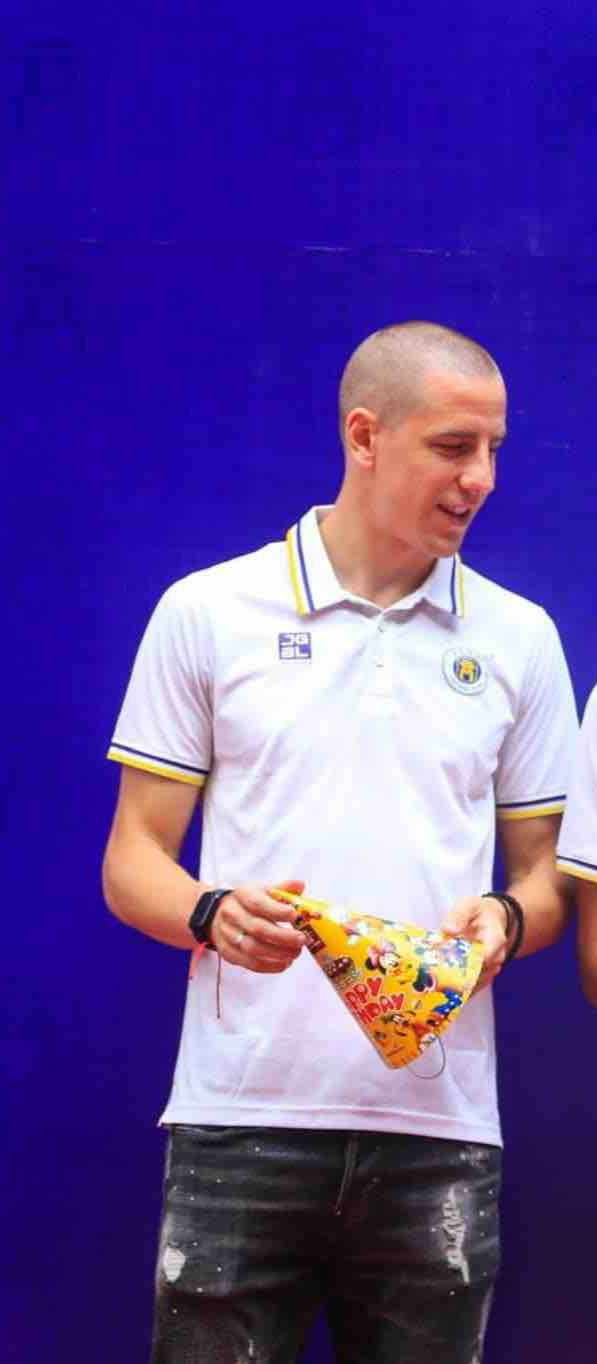
- Jevtović in 2023

Personal information
- Date of birth: 13 June 1993 (age 33)
- Place of birth: Pranjani, FR Yugoslavia
- Height: 1.84 m (6 ft 0 in)
- Position: Winger

Team information
- Current team: Borac Čačak
- Number: 10

Youth career
- Borac Čačak

Senior career*
Years	Team	Apps	(Gls)
2012–2015	Borac Čačak	63	(5)
2015–2016	LASK	0	(0)
2015	→ Borac Čačak (loan)	21	(5)
2016	→ Bodø/Glimt (loan)	20	(6)
2016–2018	Antalyaspor	19	(1)
2017	→ Rosenborg (loan)	25	(9)
2018–2020	Red Star Belgrade	16	(6)
2020	→ APOEL (loan)	6	(0)
2020–2021	AGF	16	(0)
2021–2023	Odd	50	(11)
2022	Odd II	1	(1)
2023–2024	Hanoi	8	(1)
2024	Velež Mostar	10	(1)
2025–	Borac Čačak	35	(6)

International career
2015	Serbia U23	1	(0)
- * Club domestic league appearances and goals as of 14 May 2026

Milan Jevtović (Serbian Cyrillic: Милан Јевтовић; born 13 June 1993) is a Serbian professional footballer who plays as a winger for Borac Čačak.

== Club career ==
=== Borac Čačak ===
Jevtović began his professional career at Borac Čačak, where he and the rest of the team were unpaid for up to six months at a time. Jevtović participated in the players' strike out of protest from unpaid dues in 2015. The strike was interrupted when Nenad Lalatović was hired as the new coach of Borac Čačak, after which a series of positive results followed. In a historic upset on 2 December 2015 Jevtović scored against Red Star Belgrade in a 1–5 away win for Borac.

=== Antalyaspor ===
In the summer of 2016, Jevtović joined Turkish side Antalyaspor in a €2.5 million transfer. In his first six months in Antalya, Jevtović saw only 64 minutes of playing time. As a result, he was loaned out to Norwegian club Rosenborg BK, where he saw much more playing time. While Jevtović was on loan, Rosenborg won the 2017 Eliteserien. Jevtović scored the opening goal for Rosenborg in the 2017 Mesterfinalen.

=== Red Star Belgrade ===
On 22 June 2018, Jevtović signed with Red Star Belgrade.

=== AGF Aarhus ===
On 13 July 2020, he signed a four-year contract with AGF Aarhus, which plays in the Danish Superliga. He made 22 appearances and scored one goal for the club, until he left at the end of August 2021.

=== Odd ===
On the last day of the summer transfer market 2021–22, 31 August 2021, Jevtović moved to Norwegian club Odds BK.

=== Hanoi FC ===
On 30 June 2023, Jevtović joined Vietnamese side Hanoi FC on a one-year contract. On 2 July, he made his debut for the club in a 1–0 home loss against Song Lam Nghe An in the V.League 1. On 6 August, Jevtović scored his first goal for the club in a 2–1 away defeat against Cong An Ha Noi.

== Career statistics ==
As of match played 18 August 2024

Appearances and goals by club, season and competition
Club	Season	League			National cup		Continental		Other		Total	
Club	Season	Division	Apps	Goals	Apps	Goals	Apps	Goals	Apps	Goals	Apps	Goals
Borac Čačak	2012–13	Serbian First League	16	0	3	1	—		—		19	1
Borac Čačak	2013–14	Serbian First League	25	4	2	0	—		—		27	4
Borac Čačak	2014–15	Serbian First League	22	1	0	0	—		—		22	1
Borac Čačak	Total		63	5	5	1	—		—		68	6
LASK Linz	2015–16	Austrian Football First League	0	0	0	0	—		—		0	0
Borac Čačak (loan)	2015–16	Serbian First League	21	5	2	1	—		—		23	6
Bodø/Glimt (loan)	2016	Tippeligaen	20	6	3	2	—		—		23	8
Antalyaspor	2016–17	Süper Lig	7	0	1	0	—		—		8	0
Antalyaspor	2017–18	Süper Lig	12	1	0	0	—		—		12	1
Antalyaspor	Total		19	1	1	0	—		—		20	1
Rosenborg (loan)	2017	Eliteserien	25	9	5	3	10 (Note: Four appearances in UEFA Champions League, six in UEFA Europa League)	0	1 (Note: Appearance in Mesterfinalen)	1	41	13
Red Star Belgrade	2018–19	Serbian SuperLiga	10	4	1	0	2 (Note: Appearances in UEFA Champions League)	0	—		13	4
Red Star Belgrade	2019–20	Serbian SuperLiga	6	2	2	0	3	0	—		11	2
Red Star Belgrade	Total		16	6	3	0	5	0	—		24	6
APOEL (loan)	2019–20	Cypriot First Division	6	0	2	0	—		—		8	0
AGF	2020–21	Danish Superliga	15	0	4	0	1 (Note: Appearance in UEFA Europa League)	0	—		20	0
AGF	2021–22	Danish Superliga	1	0	0	0	1 (Note: Appearance(s) in UEFA Europa Conference League)	0	—		2	0
AGF	Total		16	0	4	0	2	0	—		22	0
Odd	2021	Eliteserien	11	0	2	1	—		—		13	1
Odd	2022	Eliteserien	29	10	4	1	—		—		33	11
Odd	2023	Eliteserien	10	1	3	4	—		—		13	5
Odd	Total		50	11	9	6	—		—		59	17
Hanoi FC	2023	V.League 1	7	1	1	0	—		—		8	1
Hanoi FC	2023–24	V.League 1	1	0	0	0	2 (Note: Appearances in AFC Champions League)	0	—		3	0
Hanoi FC	Total		8	1	1	0	2	0	0	0	11	1
Velež Mostar	2024–25	Premier League BH	2	0	0	0	2	0	0	0	4	0
Career total			246	44	35	13	21	0	1	1	303	58

== Honours ==
Rosenborg

- Mesterfinalen: 2017
- Eliteserien: 2017

Red Star Belgrade

- Serbian SuperLiga: 2018–19
