= Thomas Mathisen =

Southern Netherlands painter

- Born: 1610; Antwerp
- Died: 1670; Rome

Thomas Mathisen or De Vrome (1610–1670) was a painter from the Spanish Netherlands.

Mathisen was trained in Antwerp and may have been born there, though some researchers claim he was from Husum, a town in Denmark at that time which also brought forth his contemporaries, the map-engraving brothers Petersen and the court painter in Berlin Broder Mathisen. According to Alfred von Wurzbach he signed his works 'Thomas Matthiæ' or 'Thomas Mathisen' and is the same person who signed Abraham Genoels bentbrief in Rome in the 1670s as "De Vrome".

Mathisen died in Rome.
