= Johan Lædre Bjørdal =

Norwegian footballer (born 1986)

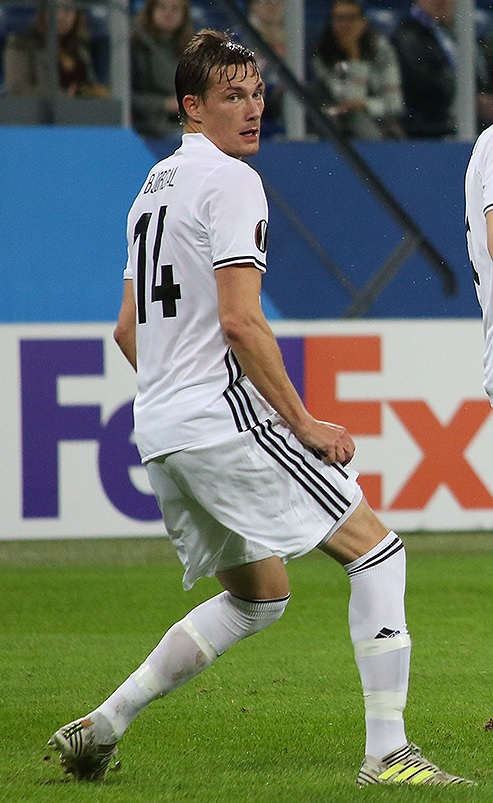
- Bjørdal playing for Rosenborg in 2017

Personal information
- Date of birth: 5 May 1986 (age 40)
- Place of birth: Egersund, Norway
- Height: 1.85 m (6 ft 1 in)
- Position: Centre back

Senior career*
Years	Team	Apps	(Gls)
2003	Egersund		
2003–2006	Viking	1	(0)
2005	→ FK Tønsberg (loan)	8	(0)
2007–2011	Bodø/Glimt	71	(2)
2011–2013	Viking	81	(4)
2014–2015	AGF	32	(2)
2015–2017	Rosenborg	43	(2)
2018–2019	Zulte Waregem	8	(0)
2019–2020	Vålerenga	35	(1)

International career^{‡}
2002	Norway U16	6	(0)
2003	Norway U17	10	(0)
2004	Norway U18	12	(1)
2005	Norway U19	10	(0)
2007–2008	Norway U21	7	(1)
2013	Norway	3	(0)
- * Club domestic league appearances and goals as of 4 Msy 2021 ‡ National team caps and goals as of 12 October 2013

Johan Lædre Bjørdal (born 5 May 1986) is a former Norwegian footballer who plays as a centre back.

== Career ==
Bjørdal was born in Egersund and began his career with his hometown club, Egersund IK, in 2003, but was signed up by Viking FK. He went on loan to FK Tønsberg in the 2005 season, having played just one game for Viking, and returned with eight games experience. Bjørdal remained at Viking for one more season, but did not play any more games, and was signed by FK Bodø/Glimt for the 2007 season. There, he played 26 games in his first season, scoring one goal. He returned to Viking ahead of the 2011 season.

Bjørdal has played at every level of Norwegian international football from under-16 to under-21 level. He was given his debut for Norway's senior team on 6 September 2013 against Cyprus.

Bjørdal's contract with Viking expired after the 2013 season, and he joined the Danish club AGF in January 2014.

In June 2015 he joined the Norwegian footballclub Rosenborg BK. He won the Norwegian top division three times during his spell in Rosenborg, in 2015, 2016 and 2017, as well as the Norwegian Football Cup in 2015 and 2016.

On 23 January 2018 Bjørdal signed a 2,5-year contract with Belgium side Zulte Waregem.

== Career statistics ==
=== Club ===
As of match played 22 December 2020

Appearances and goals by club, season and competition
Club	Season	League			National Cup		Europe		Other		Total	
Club	Season	Division	Apps	Goals	Apps	Goals	Apps	Goals	Apps	Goals	Apps	Goals
Viking	2004	Tippeligaen	1	0	0	0	-		-		1	0
Viking	2005	Tippeligaen	0	0	1	1	-		-		1	1
Viking	2006	Tippeligaen	0	0	1	0	-		-		1	0
Viking	Total		1	0	2	1	-	-	-	-	3	1
Tønsberg (loan)	2005	1. divisjon	8	0	0	0	-		-		8	0
Tønsberg (loan)	Total		8	0	0	0	-	-	-	-	8	0
Bodø/Glimt	2007	1. divisjon	26	1	2	0	-		-		28	1
Bodø/Glimt	2008	Tippeligaen	6	0	1	0	-		-		7	0
Bodø/Glimt	2009	Tippeligaen	13	1	0	0	-		-		13	1
Bodø/Glimt	2010	1. divisjon	27	0	2	0	-		-		29	0
Bodø/Glimt	Total		72	2	5	0	-	-	-	-	77	2
Viking	2011	Tippeligaen	30	1	5	0	-		-		35	1
Viking	2012	Tippeligaen	21	1	0	0	-		-		21	1
Viking	2013	Tippeligaen	30	2	2	2	-		-		34	4
Viking	Total		81	4	7	2	-	-	-	-	88	6
AGF	2013–14	Superliga	15	0	1	0	-		-		16	0
AGF	2014–15	1st Division	17	2	0	0	-		-		17	2
AGF	Total		32	2	1	0	-	-	-	-	33	2
Rosenborg	2015	Eliteserien	13	2	2	0	7	0	-		22	2
Rosenborg	2016	Eliteserien	12	0	5	1	2	0	-		19	1
Rosenborg	2017	Eliteserien	18	0	4	0	8	0	1	0	31	0
Rosenborg	Total		43	2	11	1	17	0	1	0	72	3
Zulte Waregem	2017–18	Belgian First Division A	5	0	0	0	-		-		5	0
Zulte Waregem	2018–19	Belgian First Division A	3	0	1	0	-		-		4	0
Zulte Waregem	Total		8	0	1	0	-	-	-	-	9	0
Vålerenga	2019	Eliteserien	27	1	0	0	-		-		27	1
Vålerenga	2020	Eliteserien	12	0	0	0	-		-		12	0
Vålerenga	Total		39	1	0	0	-	-	-	-	39	1
Career total			284	11	27	4	17	0	1	0	329	15

== Honours ==
=== Club ===
Rosenborg

- Norwegian League (3): 2015, 2016, 2017
- Norwegian Football Cup (2): 2015, 2016
- Mesterfinalen (1): 2017
