= Piotr Gawęcki =

Polish footballer (born 1989)

Personal information
- Full name: Piotr Gawęcki
- Date of birth: 24 May 1989 (age 37)
- Place of birth: Kielce, Poland
- Height: 1.80 m (5 ft 11 in)
- Position: Striker

Youth career
- –2006: Korona Kielce

Senior career*
Years	Team	Apps	(Gls)
2006–2007	Korona Kielce II		
2007–2012	Korona Kielce	35	(9)
2010–2011	→ Dolcan Ząbki (loan)	17	(1)
2012–2014	Gjøvik	37	(9)
2014	Stal Mielec	13	(1)
2015–2019	Eidsvold		
2019	Lørenskog		
- * Club domestic league appearances and goals

Piotr Gawęcki (born 24 May 1989) is a Polish former professional footballer who played as a striker.

== Club career ==
Born in Kielce, Gawęcki started his senior career with Korona Kielce's reserve team. His I liga debut and first goal for the club came on 27 August 2008, in a 3–0 win against GKP Gorzów Wielkopolski, after coming off the bench in the 46th minute.

In August 2010, he was loaned to Dolcan Ząbki on a one-year deal. He was released from Dolcan Ząbki on 27 June 2011.

In July 2012, he signed for Norwegian club Gjøvik On 4 August 2012, he scored two debut goals in the 2–2 draw against Lillehammer FK, and he was named the Man of the Match.
