= Ørjan Røyrane =

Norwegian footballer (born 1988)

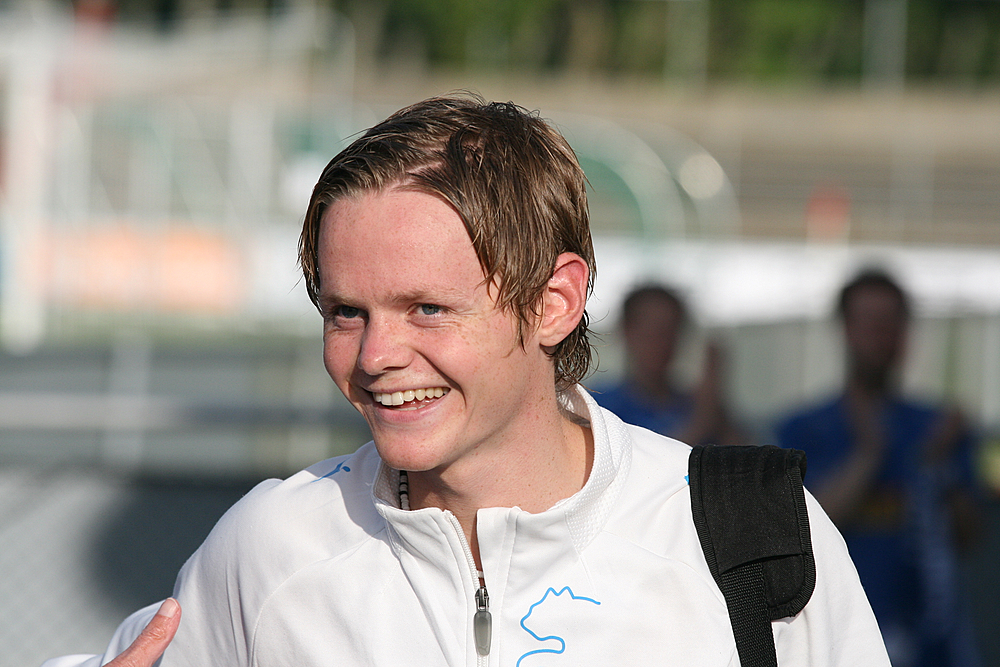

Personal information
- Date of birth: 10 July 1988 (age 38)
- Place of birth: Kvinnherad Municipality, Norway
- Height: 1.72 m (5 ft 8 in)
- Position: Midfielder

Senior career*
Years	Team	Apps	(Gls)
2004–2005	Norheimsund		
2006–2014	Sandefjord	120	(16)
2015–2018	Kongsvinger	43	(8)
- * Club domestic league appearances and goals as of 28 October 2016

Ørjan Røyrane (born 10 July 1988) is a Norwegian football midfielder who most recently played for Kongsvinger.

He made his debut for Norheimsund IL in the Norwegian Second Division in 2004. After the 2005 season he signed for Sandefjord Fotball together with his older brother Jon André.

His brother was sold to Løv-Ham Fotball after the 2007 season.

== Career statistics ==
As of 25 November 2016

Season	Club	Division	League		Cup		Total	
Season	Club	Division	Apps	Goals	Apps	Goals	Apps	Goals
2006	Sandefjord	Tippeligaen	2	0	3	0	5	0
2007	Sandefjord	Tippeligaen	3	0	2	0	5	0
2008	Sandefjord	Adeccoligaen	17	3	0	0	17	3
2009	Sandefjord	Tippeligaen	25	3	2	0	27	3
2010	Sandefjord	Tippeligaen	17	1	2	1	19	2
2011	Sandefjord	Adeccoligaen	20	6	1	0	21	6
2012	Sandefjord	Adeccoligaen	0	0	0	0	0	0
2013	Sandefjord	Adeccoligaen	20	2	2	0	22	2
2014	Sandefjord	1. divisjon	16	1	0	0	16	1
2015	Kongsvinger	2. divisjon	20	6	1	1	21	7
2016	Kongsvinger	OBOS-ligaen	16	2	4	1	20	3
2017		OBOS-ligaen	7	0			7	0
Career Total			163	24	17	3	180	27
