= Adem Güven =

Turkish footballer (born 1985)

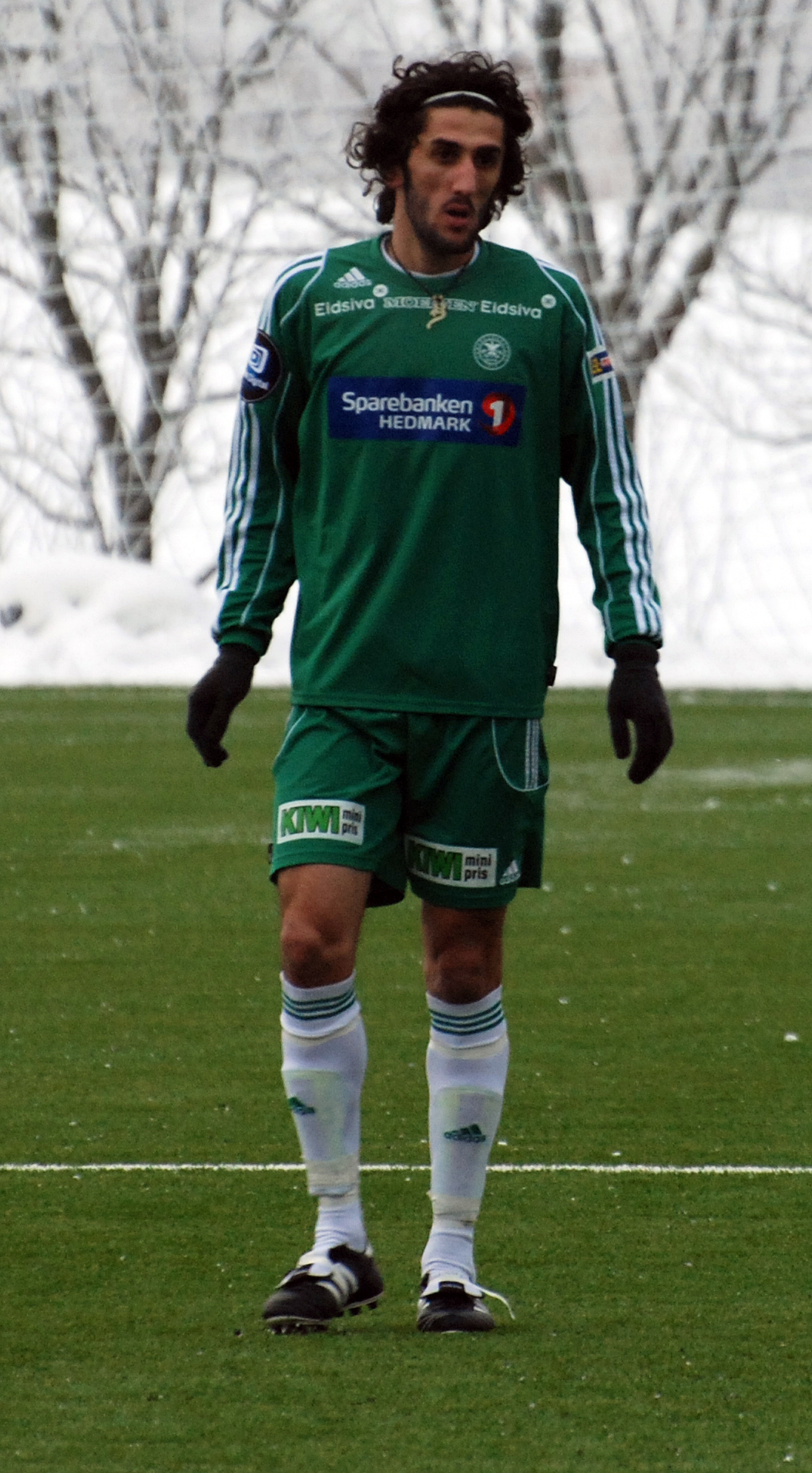

Personal information
- Date of birth: 11 October 1985 (age 41)
- Place of birth: Konya, Turkey
- Height: 1.84 m (6 ft 0 in)
- Position: Striker

Team information
- Current team: Kongsvinger
- Number: 9

Youth career
- Kolstad
- Raufoss

Senior career*
Years	Team	Apps	(Gls)
2002–2007	Raufoss	104	(37)
2008–2009	HamKam	44	(9)
2010–2011	Kongsvinger	59	(16)
2011–2013	Odd	44	(7)
2013–2015	Mersin İdman Yurdu	12	(2)
2015–2025	Kongsvinger	235	(101)
- * Club domestic league appearances and goals as of 14 November 2024

Adem Güven (born 11 October 1985) is a former Turkish football player. Before retiring, he played ten consecutive seasons for Kongsvinger.

== Career ==
Güven was born in Konya, Turkey, but grew up in Trondheim, Norway, and started playing football for Kolstad. At age 13, his family moved to Raufoss, where Güven started his senior career with Raufoss IL. On 21 November 2007, he signed for Eliteserien club HamKam. After HamKam were relegated two consecutive seasons, Güven signed for Kongsvinger in December 2009. He stayed with Kongsvinger for two seasons, before joining Odd in December 2011. He left Odd in July 2013, and then joined Turkish club Mersin İdman Yurdu. He returned to Kongsvinger in September 2015.

== Career statistics ==
As of match played 5 November 2023

Appearances and goals by club, season and competition
Club	Season	League			Cup		Other		Total	
Club	Season	Division	Apps	Goals	Apps	Goals	Apps	Goals	Apps	Goals
Ham-Kam	2008	Eliteserien	19	1	2	0	—		21	1
Ham-Kam	2009	1. divisjon	25	8	1	2	—		26	10
Ham-Kam	Total		44	9	3	2	—		47	11
Kongsvinger	2010	Eliteserien	30	7	4	1	—		34	8
Kongsvinger	2011	1. divisjon	29	9	2	1	—		31	10
Kongsvinger	Total		59	16	6	2	—		65	18
Odd	2012	Eliteserien	27	5	4	3	—		31	8
Odd	2013	Eliteserien	17	2	4	0	—		21	2
Odd	Total		44	7	8	3	—		52	10
Mersin İdmanyurdu	2013–14	TFF First League	11	2	1	0	—		12	2
Mersin İdmanyurdu	2014–15	Süper Lig	1	0	2	0	—		3	0
Mersin İdmanyurdu	Total		12	2	3	0	—		15	2
Kongsvinger	2015	2. divisjon	5	1	0	0	—		5	1
Kongsvinger	2016	1. divisjon	25	14	5	2	1 (Note: Appearance(s) in promotion play-offs)	2	31	18
Kongsvinger	2017	1. divisjon	24	10	1	0	—		25	10
Kongsvinger	2018	1. divisjon	25	11	3	3	—		28	14
Kongsvinger	2019	1. divisjon	28	16	4	3	2	0	34	19
Kongsvinger	2020	1. divisjon	29	7	—		—		29	7
Kongsvinger	2021	2. divisjon	25	21	2	4	—		27	25
Kongsvinger	2022	1. divisjon	20	6	2	0	—		22	6
Kongsvinger	2023	1. divisjon	26	10	1	1	—		27	11
Kongsvinger	Total		207	96	18	13	3	2	228	111
Career total			366	130	38	20	3	2	392	152
