= Norway national football team results (2020–present) =

- Win Draw Loss

This is a list of the Norway national football team results from 2020 to the present day.

== 2020s ==
Win Draw Loss

=== 2020 ===
1 June Friendly	Denmark	Cancelled	Norway	Denmark
		Report		Stadium: TBD

6 June Friendly	Norway	Cancelled	Slovakia	Oslo, Norway
		Report		Stadium: Ullevaal Stadion

4 September 2020–21 UEFA Nations League B	Norway	1–2	Austria	Oslo, Norway
20:45	Haaland 66'	Report	Gregoritsch 35'; Sabitzer 54' (pen.)	Stadium: Ullevaal Stadion; Attendance: 0 (Note: Due to the COVID-19 pandemic in Europe, all matches scheduled for September 2020 were played behind closed doors.); Referee: Mattias Gestranius (Finland)

7 September 2020–21 UEFA Nations League B	Northern Ireland	1–5	Norway	Belfast, Northern Ireland
20:45	McNair 6'	Report	Elyounoussi 2'; Haaland 7', 58'; Sørloth 19', 47'	Stadium: Windsor Park; Attendance: 0 Referee: Bartosz Frankowski (Poland)

8 October UEFA Euro 2020 qualifying play-offs	Norway	1–2 (a.e.t.)	Serbia	Oslo, Norway
18:00	Normann 88'	Report	Milinković-Savić 82', 102'	Stadium: Ullevaal Stadion; Attendance: 200; Referee: Daniele Orsato (Italy)

11 October 2020–21 UEFA Nations League B	Norway	4–0	Romania	Oslo, Norway
18:00	Haaland 13', 64', 74'; Sørloth 39'	Report		Stadium: Ullevaal Stadion; Attendance: 200; Referee: Ivan Kružliak (Slovakia)

14 October 2020–21 UEFA Nations League B	Norway	1–0	Northern Ireland	Oslo, Norway
20:45	Dallas 68' (o.g.)	Report		Stadium: Ullevaal Stadion; Attendance: 200; Referee: Kristo Tohver (Estonia)

11 November Friendly	Norway	Cancelled	Israel	Oslo, Norway
		Report		Stadium: Ullevaal Stadion

15 November 2020–21 UEFA Nations League B	Romania	3–0; Awarded (Note: The Romania v Norway match was cancelled and awarded as a 3–0 win to Romania after the Norway national team were prohibited from travelling to Romania by the Norwegian government due to a positive SARS-CoV-2 test in the squad.)	Norway	Bucharest, Romania
20:45		Report		Stadium: Arena Națională; Referee: Ali Palabıyık (Turkey)

18 November 2020–21 UEFA Nations League B	Austria	1–1	Norway	Vienna, Austria
20:45	Grbić 90+4'	Report	Zahid 61'	Stadium: Ernst-Happel-Stadion; Attendance: 0 Referee: Benoît Bastien (France)

=== 2021 ===
24 March 2022 FIFA World Cup qualification	Gibraltar	0–3	Norway	Gibraltar
20:45		Report (FIFA); Report (UEFA)	Sørloth 43'; Thorstvedt 45'; Svensson 57'	Stadium: Victoria Stadium; Attendance: 0 Referee: Duje Strukan (Croatia)

27 March 2022 FIFA World Cup qualification	Norway	0–3	Turkey	Málaga, Spain
18:00		Report	Tufan 4', 59'; Söyüncü 28'	Stadium: La Rosaleda Stadium (Note: The match, originally to be played at Ullevaal Stadion, Oslo, was moved to Estadio La Rosaleda, Málaga (Spain), due to the travel ban in response to the COVID-19 pandemic in Turkey.); Attendance: 0 Referee: Alejandro Hernández (Spain)

30 March 2022 FIFA World Cup qualification	Montenegro	0–1	Norway	Podgorica, Montenegro
20:45		Report	Sørloth 35'	Stadium: Podgorica City Stadium; Attendance: 0 Referee: Anthony Taylor (England)

2 June Friendly	Norway	1–0	Luxembourg	Málaga, Spain
19:00	Haaland 90+2'	Report		Stadium: La Rosaleda; Attendance: 0 Referee: Kristoffer Karlsson (Sweden)

6 June Friendly	Norway	1–2	Greece	Málaga, Spain
19:00	Strandberg 64'	Report	Masouras 13'; Androutsos 21'	Stadium: La Rosaleda; Attendance: 0 Referee: Jakob Kehlet (Denmark)

1 September 2022 FIFA World Cup qualification	Norway	1–1	Netherlands	Oslo, Norway
20:45	Haaland 20'	Report	Klaassen 37'	Stadium: Ullevaal Stadion; Attendance: 6,711; Referee: Szymon Marciniak (Poland)

4 September 2022 FIFA World Cup qualification	Latvia	0–2	Norway	Riga, Latvia
18:00		Report	Haaland 20' (pen.); M. Elyounoussi 66'	Stadium: Daugava Stadium; Attendance: 2,520; Referee: David Fuxman (Israel)

7 September 2022 FIFA World Cup qualification	Norway	5–1	Gibraltar	Oslo, Norway
20:45	Thorstvedt 23'; Haaland 27', 39', 90+1'; Sørloth 59'	Report	Styche 43'	Stadium: Ullevaal Stadion; Attendance: 9,442; Referee: Nikolas Neokleous (Cyprus)

8 October 2022 FIFA World Cup qualification	Turkey	1–1	Norway	Istanbul, Turkey
20:45	Aktürkoğlu 6'	Report	Thorstvedt 41'	Stadium: Şükrü Saracoğlu Stadium; Attendance: 21,408; Referee: Felix Brych (Germany)

11 October 2022 FIFA World Cup qualification	Norway	2–0	Montenegro	Oslo, Norway
20:45	Elyounoussi 29', 90+6'	Report		Stadium: Ullevaal Stadion; Attendance: 23,748; Referee: István Kovács (Romania)

13 November 2022 FIFA World Cup qualification	Norway	0–0	Latvia	Oslo, Norway
18:00		Report		Stadium: Ullevaal Stadion; Attendance: 24,376; Referee: Lawrence Visser (Belgium)

16 November 2022 FIFA World Cup qualification	Netherlands	2–0	Norway	Rotterdam, Netherlands
20:45	Bergwijn 84'; Depay 90+1'	Report		Stadium: De Kuip; Attendance: 0 Referee: Clément Turpin (France)

=== 2022 ===
25 March Friendly	Norway	2–0	Slovakia	Oslo, Norway
18:00	Haaland 77'; Ødegaard 80'	Report		Stadium: Ullevaal Stadion; Attendance: 11,048; Referee: Mattias Gestranius (Finland)

29 March Friendly	Norway	9–0	Armenia	Oslo, Norway
18:00	Haaland 24', 45+1'; King 28' (pen.), 33', 59'; Thorstvedt 30'; Dæhli 80'; Sørloth 86', 90+1'	Report		Stadium: Ullevaal Stadion; Attendance: 9,032; Referee: Mads-Kristoffer Kristoffersen (Denmark)

2 June 2022–23 UEFA Nations League B	Serbia	0–1	Norway	Belgrade, Serbia
20:45		Report	Haaland 26'	Stadium: Red Star Stadium; Attendance: 9,726; Referee: Paweł Raczkowski (Poland)

5 June 2022–23 UEFA Nations League B	Sweden	1–2	Norway	Solna, Sweden
20:45	Elanga 90+2'	Report	Haaland 20' (pen.), 69'	Stadium: Friends Arena; Attendance: 42,320; Referee: Anthony Taylor (England)

9 June 2022–23 UEFA Nations League B	Norway	0–0	Slovenia	Oslo, Norway
20:45		Report		Stadium: Ullevaal Stadion; Attendance: 18,134; Referee: Fábio Veríssimo (Portugal)

12 June 2022–23 UEFA Nations League B	Norway	3–2	Sweden	Oslo, Norway
18:00	Haaland 10', 54' (pen.); Sørloth 77'	Report	Forsberg 62'; Gyökeres 90+5'	Stadium: Ullevaal Stadion; Attendance: 24,273; Referee: Harm Osmers (Germany)

24 September 2022–23 UEFA Nations League B	Slovenia	2–1	Norway	Ljubljana, Slovenia
18:00 UTC+2	Šporar 69'; Šeško 81'	Report	Haaland 47'	Stadium: Stožice Stadium; Attendance: 14,824; Referee: Lawrence Visser (Belgium)

27 September 2022–23 UEFA Nations League B	Norway	0–2	Serbia	Oslo, Norway
20:45 UTC+2		Report	Vlahović 42'; A. Mitrović 54'	Stadium: Ullevaal Stadion; Attendance: 24,364; Referee: Antonio Mateu Lahoz (Spain)

17 November Friendly	Republic of Ireland	1–2	Norway	Dublin, Ireland
19:45 UTC+0	Browne 69'	Report	Østigård 40'; Omoijuanfo 85'	Stadium: Aviva Stadium; Attendance: 41,120; Referee: Allard Lindhout (Netherlands)

20 November Friendly	Norway	1–1	Finland	Oslo, Norway
13:00 UTC+1	Sørloth 46'	Report	Källman 32'	Stadium: Ullevaal Stadion; Attendance: 13,347; Referee: Morten Krogh (Denmark)

=== 2023 ===
25 March UEFA Euro 2024 qualifying	Spain	3–0	Norway	Málaga, Spain
20:45 UTC+2	Olmo 13'; Joselu 84', 85'	Report		Stadium: La Rosaleda; Attendance: 29,214; Referee: Benoît Bastien (France)

28 March UEFA Euro 2024 qualifying	Georgia	1–1	Norway	Batumi, Georgia
20:00 UTC+4	Mikautadze 60'	Report	Sørloth 15'	Stadium: Batumi Stadium; Attendance: 20,300; Referee: Andris Treimanis (Latvia)

17 June UEFA Euro 2024 qualifying	Norway	1–2	Scotland	Oslo, Norway
18:00 UTC+2	Haaland 61' (pen.)	Report	Dykes 87'; McLean 89'	Stadium: Ullevaal Stadion; Attendance: 25,791; Referee: Matej Jug (Slovenia)

20 June UEFA Euro 2024 qualifying	Norway	3–1	Cyprus	Oslo, Norway
20:45 UTC+2	Solbakken 12'; Haaland 56' (pen.), 60'	Report	Kastanos 90+3'	Stadium: Ullevaal Stadion; Attendance: 23,643; Referee: Aleksandar Stavrev (North Macedonia)

7 September Friendly	Norway	6–0	Jordan	Oslo, Norway
18:00 UTC+1	Nusa 11'; Ajer 23'; Larsen 31'; Bjørkan 41'; Finne 79'; Vetlesen 90+1'	Report		Stadium: Ullevaal Stadion; Attendance: 10,532; Referee: Kristoffer Karlsson (Sweden)

12 September UEFA Euro 2024 qualifying	Norway	2–1	Georgia	Oslo, Norway
20:45 UTC+2	Haaland 25'; Ødegaard 33'	Report	Zivzivadze 90+1'	Stadium: Ullevaal Stadion; Attendance: 23,665; Referee: Nikola Dabanović (Montenegro)

12 October UEFA Euro 2024 qualifying	Cyprus	0–4	Norway	Larnaca, Cyprus
21:45 UTC+3		Report	Sørloth 33'; Haaland 65', 72'; Aursnes 81'	Stadium: AEK Arena; Attendance: 7,206; Referee: Donatas Rumšas (Lithuania)

15 October UEFA Euro 2024 qualifying	Norway	0–1	Spain	Oslo, Norway
20:45 UTC+2		Report	Gavi 49'	Stadium: Ullevaal Stadion; Attendance: 25,885; Referee: Tobias Stieler (Germany)

16 November Friendly	Norway	2–0	Faroe Islands	Oslo, Norway
18:00 UTC+1	Strand Larsen 3'; Bobb 24'	Report		Stadium: Ullevaal Stadion; Attendance: 11,071; Referee: Vilhjálmur Thórarinsson (Iceland)

19 November UEFA Euro 2024 qualifying	Scotland	3–3	Norway	Glasgow, Scotland
19:45 UTC+0	McGinn 13' (pen.); Østigård 33' (o.g.); Armstrong 59'	Report	Dønnum 3'; Strand Larsen 20'; Elyounoussi 86'	Stadium: Hampden Park; Attendance: 48,138; Referee: Horațiu Feșnic (Romania)

=== 2024 ===
22 March Friendly	Norway	1–2	Czech Republic	Oslo, Norway
17:00 UTC+1	Bobb 20'	Report	Zima 36'; Barák 85'	Stadium: Ullevaal Stadion; Attendance: 11,891; Referee: Willy Delajod (France)

26 March Friendly	Norway	1–1	Slovakia	Oslo, Norway
18:00 UTC+1	Sørloth 18'; Haaland (penalty missed) 52'	Report	Duda 87'	Stadium: Ullevaal Stadion; Attendance: 9,099; Referee: Giorgi Kruashvili (Georgia)

5 June Friendly	Norway	3–0	Kosovo	Oslo, Norway
18:00 UTC+1	Haaland 15', 70', 75'	Report		Stadium: Ullevaal Stadion; Attendance: 19,634; Referee: Mikkel Redder (Denmark)

8 June Friendly	Denmark	3–1	Norway	Brøndbyvester, Denmark
18:30 UTC+1	Højbjerg 12'; Vestergaard 21'; Poulsen 90'	Report	Haaland 72'	Stadium: Brøndby Stadium; Attendance: 23,390; Referee: Stéphanie Frappart (France)

6 September 2024–25 UEFA Nations League B	Kazakhstan	0–0	Norway	Astana, Kazakhstan
15:00 UTC+5		Report		Stadium: Astana Arena; Attendance: 23,173; Referee: Allard Lindhout (Netherlands)

9 September 2024–25 UEFA Nations League B	Norway	2–1	Austria	Oslo, Norway
19:45 UTC+1	Mhyre 9'; Haaland 80'	Report	Sabitzer 37'	Stadium: Ullevaal Stadion; Attendance: 23,171; Referee: Nikola Dabanović (Montenegro)

10 October 2024–25 UEFA Nations League B	Norway	3–0	Slovenia	Oslo, Norway
19:45 UTC+1	Haaland 7', 62'; Sørloth 52'	Report		Stadium: Ullevaal Stadion; Attendance: 9,814; Referee: Manfredas Lukjančukas (Lithuania)

13 October 2024–25 UEFA Nations League B	Austria	5–1	Norway	Vienna, Austria
19:45 UTC+1	Arnautović 8', 49' (pen.); Lienhart 58'; Posch 62'; Gregoritsch 71'	Report	Sørloth 39'	Stadium: Ernst-Happel-Stadion; Attendance: 16,500; Referee: Tamás Bognár (Hungary)

14 November 2024–25 UEFA Nations League B	Slovenia	1–4	Norway	Ljubljana, Slovenia
20:45 UTC+1	Šeško 21' (pen.)	Report	Nusa 9', 54'; Haaland 45'; Hauge 82'	Stadium: Stožice Stadium; Attendance: 15,308; Referee: Michael Oliver (England)

17 November 2024–25 UEFA Nations League B	Norway	5–0	Kazakhstan	Oslo, Norway
18:00 UTC+1	Haaland 23', 37', 71'; Sørloth 41'; Nusa 76'	Report		Stadium: Ullevaal Stadion; Attendance: 23,458; Referee: Jasper Vergoote (Belgium)

=== 2025 ===
22 March 2026 FIFA World Cup qualification	Moldova	0–5	Norway	Chișinău, Moldova
19:00 UTC+2		Report	Ryerson 5'; Haaland 23'; Aasgaard 38'; Sørloth 43'; Dønnum 69'	Stadium: Zimbru Stadium; Attendance: 9,342; Referee: Matej Jug (Slovenia)

25 March 2026 FIFA World Cup qualification	Israel	2–4	Norway	Debrecen, Hungary
20:45 UTC+2	Abu Fani 55'; Turgeman 90+3'	Report	Møller Wolfe 39'; Sørloth 59'; Ajer 65'; Haaland 83'	Stadium: Nagyerdei Stadion; Attendance: 1,200; Referee: Chris Kavanagh (England)

6 June 2026 FIFA World Cup qualification	Norway	3–0	Italy	Oslo, Norway
20:45 UTC+2	Sørloth 14'; Nusa 34'; Haaland 42'	Report		Stadium: Ullevaal Stadion; Attendance: 25,796; Referee: José María Sánchez Martínez (Spain)

9 June 2026 FIFA World Cup qualification	Estonia	0–1	Norway	Tallinn, Estonia
21:45 UTC+3		Report	Haaland 62'	Stadium: Lilleküla Stadium; Attendance: 11,577; Referee: Srđan Jovanović (Serbia)

4 September Friendly	Norway	1–0	Finland	Oslo, Norway
18:00 UTC+2	Haaland 17' (pen.)	Report		Stadium: Ullevaal Stadion; Attendance: 18,665; Referee: Rob Hennessy (Ireland)

9 September 2026 FIFA World Cup qualification	Norway	11–1	Moldova	Oslo, Norway
20:45 UTC+2	Horn Myhre 6'; Haaland 11', 36', 43', 52', 83'; Ødegaard 45+1'; Aasgaard 67', 76', 79' (pen.), 90+1'	Report	Østigård 74' (o.g.)	Stadium: Ullevaal Stadion; Attendance: 24,605; Referee: Balázs Berke (Hungary)

11 October 2026 FIFA World Cup qualification	Norway	5–0	Israel	Oslo, Norway
18:00 UTC+2	Khalaili 18' (o.g.); Haaland 27', 63', 72'; Nachmias 28' (o.g.)	Report		Stadium: Ullevaal Stadion; Attendance: 19,363; Referee: Szymon Marciniak (Poland)

14 October Friendly	Norway	1–1	New Zealand	Oslo, Norway
18:00 UTC+2	Nusa 63'	Report	Surman 45+1'	Stadium: Ullevaal Stadion; Attendance: 17,652; Referee: Horațiu Feșnic (Romania)

13 November 2026 FIFA World Cup qualification	Norway	4–1	Estonia	Oslo, Norway
18:00 UTC+1	Sørloth 50', 52'; Haaland 56', 62'	Report	Saarma 64'	Stadium: Ullevaal Stadion; Attendance: 25,493; Referee: Matej Jug (Slovenia)

16 November 2026 FIFA World Cup qualification	Italy	1–4	Norway	Milan, Italy
20:45 UTC+1	Esposito 11'	Report	Nusa 63'; Haaland 77', 79'; Larsen 90+3'	Stadium: San Siro; Attendance: 69,020; Referee: Alejandro Hernández Hernández (Spain)

=== 2026 ===
27 March Friendly	Netherlands	2–1	Norway	Amsterdam, Netherlands
20:45 UTC+1	Van Dijk 35'; Reijnders 51'	Report	Schjelderup 24'	Stadium: Johan Cruyff Arena; Attendance: 50,327; Referee: Lawrence Visser (Belgium)

31 March Friendly	Norway	0–0	Switzerland	Oslo, Norway
20:45 UTC+2		Report		Stadium: Ullevaal Stadion; Attendance: 23,913; Referee: Jasper Vergoote (Belgium)

1 June Friendly	Norway	3–1	Sweden	Oslo, Norway
19:00 UTC+2	Larsen 9', 37'; Nusa 18'	Report	Isak 76'	Stadium: Ullevaal Stadion; Attendance: 25,138; Referee: Balázs Berke (Hungary)

7 June Friendly	Morocco	1–1	Norway	Harrison, United States
15:00 UTC-4	Brahim 8'	Report	Ødegaard 75'	Stadium: Sports Illustrated Stadium; Attendance: 25,000; Referee: Pierre-Luc Lauzière (Canada)

16 June 2026 FIFA World Cup Group I	Iraq	1–4	Norway	Foxborough, United States
18:00 UTC−4	Hussein 39'	Report	Haaland 29', 43'; Østigård 76'; Hussein 90+6' (o.g.)	Stadium: Gillette Stadium; Attendance: 63,106; Referee: Pierre Atcho (Gabon)

22 June 2026 FIFA World Cup Group I	Norway	3–2	Senegal	East Rutherford, United States
20:00 UTC−4	Pedersen 43'; Haaland 48', 58'	Report	Sarr 53', 90+3'	Stadium: MetLife Stadium; Attendance: 80,663; Referee: Wilton Sampaio (Brazil)

26 June 2026 FIFA World Cup Group I	Norway	1–4	France	Foxborough, United States
15:00 UTC−4	Aasgaard 21'	Report	Dembélé 7', 20', 32'; Doué 90+4'	Stadium: Gillette Stadium; Attendance: 64,146; Referee: Michael Oliver (England)

30 June 2026 FIFA World Cup Round of 32	Ivory Coast	1–2	Norway	Arlington, United States
13:00 UTC−5	Amad 74'	Report	Nusa 39'; Haaland 86'	Stadium: AT&T Stadium; Attendance: 69,665; Referee: Jesús Valenzuela (Venezuela)

5 July 2026 FIFA World Cup Round of 16	Brazil	1–2	Norway	East Rutherford, United States
16:00 UTC−4	Bruno Guimarães (penalty missed) 14'; Neymar 90+10' (pen.)	Report	Haaland 79', 90'	Stadium: MetLife Stadium; Attendance: 80,663; Referee: Ismail Elfath (United States)

11 July 2026 FIFA World Cup Quarter-final	Norway	1–2 (a.e.t.)	England	Miami Gardens, United States
16:00 UTC−4	Schjelderup 36'	Report	Bellingham 45+2', 93'	Stadium: Miami Stadium; Attendance: 64,478; Referee: Clément Turpin (France)

24 September 2026–27 UEFA Nations League A	Norway	3–2	Denmark	Oslo, Norway
20:45 UTC+2	Bobb 14'; Haaland 18', 74'	Report	Damsgaard 25'; Højlund 60'	Stadium: Ullevaal Stadion; Attendance: 25,002; Referee: Tobias Stieler (Germany)

27 September 2026–27 UEFA Nations League A	Norway	1–2	Portugal	Oslo, Norway
20:45 UTC+2	Haaland 51'	Report	Félix 17'; Ramos 54'	Stadium: Ullevaal Stadion; Attendance: 25,953; Referee: François Letexier (France)

1 October 2026–27 UEFA Nations League A	Wales	2–1	Norway	Cardiff, Wales
19:45 UTC+1	James 38'; Williams 48'	Report	Bobb 11'	Stadium: Cardiff City Stadium; Attendance: 32,076; Referee: Alejandro Hernández Hernández (Spain)

4 October 2026–27 UEFA Nations League A	Portugal	2–1	Norway	Porto, Portugal
19:45 UTC+1	Cancelo 38'; Ramos 79'	Report	Ajer 36'	Stadium: Estádio do Dragão; Attendance: 48,832; Referee: Maurizio Mariani (Italy)

14 November 2026–27 UEFA Nations League A	Norway	3–1	Wales	Oslo, Norway
18:00 UTC+1	Nusa 59'; Schjelderup 68'; Haaland 88' (pen.)	Report	Brooks 79'	Stadium: Ullevaal Stadion; Attendance: 25,317; Referee: Oleksii Derevinskyi (Ukraine)

17 November 2026–27 UEFA Nations League A	Norway	2–3	Norway	Copenhagen, Denmark
20:45 UTC+1	Højlund 11'; Højbjerg 14'	Report	Haaland 37', 90+6' (pen.); Ødegaard 83'	Stadium: Parken Stadium; Attendance: 36,047; Referee: Halil Umut Meler (Turkey)
