= 2020–21 in Turkish football =

Football in Turkey
- Season: 2020–21

Men's football
- Süper Lig: Beşiktaş
- First League: Adana Demirspor
- Turkish Cup: Beşiktaş
- Turkish Super Cup: Trabzonspor

The 2020–21 season was the 116th season of competitive football in Turkey.

== Pre-season ==
League	Promoted to league	Relegated from league
Süper Lig	Hatayspor; BB Erzurumspor; Fatih Karagümrük	No relegations.
1.Lig	Bandırmaspor; Samsunspor; Tuzlaspor	No relegations.
2.Lig	Serik Belediyespor; 24 Erzincanspor; Kocaelispor; Turgutluspor; Karacabey Belediyespor; Pazarspor	No relegations.
3.Lig	Mardin Büyükşehir Başakspor; Siirt İl Özel İdaresispor; Kahta 02 Spor; Adıyaman 1954 Spor; Arhavispor; Çarşambaspor; İçel İdman Yurdu; Ceyhanspor; Kırıkkale Büyük Anadoluspor; Antalya Kestelspor; Isparta 32 Spor; Karaman Belediyespor; Bergama Belediyespor; Bursa Yıldırımspor; Belediye Kütahyaspor; Yalovaspor; Arnavutköy Belediyespor; Edirnespor; Tekirdağspor; Çengelköy	No relegations.

== League tables ==
=== Süper Lig ===
Pos	Team	Pld	W	D	L	GF	GA	GD	Pts	Qualification or relegation
1	Beşiktaş (C)	40	26	6	8	89	44	+45	84	Qualification for the Champions League group stage
2	Galatasaray	40	26	6	8	80	36	+44	84	Qualification for the Champions League second qualifying round
3	Fenerbahçe	40	25	7	8	72	41	+31	82	Qualification for the Europa League play-off round
4	Trabzonspor	40	19	14	7	50	37	+13	71	Qualification for the Europa Conference League third qualifying round
5	Sivasspor	40	16	17	7	54	43	+11	65	Qualification for the Europa Conference League second qualifying round
6	Hatayspor	40	17	10	13	62	53	+9	61	
7	Alanyaspor	40	17	9	14	58	45	+13	60	
8	Fatih Karagümrük	40	16	12	12	64	52	+12	60	
9	Gaziantep	40	15	13	12	59	51	+8	58	
10	Göztepe	40	13	12	15	59	59	0	51	
11	Konyaspor	40	12	14	14	49	48	+1	50	
12	İstanbul Başakşehir	40	12	12	16	43	55	−12	48	
13	Çaykur Rizespor	40	12	12	16	53	69	−16	48	
14	Kasımpaşa	40	12	10	18	47	57	−10	46	
15	Yeni Malatyaspor	40	10	15	15	49	53	−4	45	
16	Antalyaspor	40	9	17	14	41	55	−14	44	
17	Kayserispor	40	9	14	17	35	52	−17	41	
18	BB Erzurumspor (R)	40	10	10	20	44	68	−24	40	Relegation to TFF First League
19	Ankaragücü (R)	40	10	8	22	46	65	−19	38	Relegation to TFF First League
20	Gençlerbirliği (R)	40	10	8	22	44	76	−32	38	Relegation to TFF First League
21	Denizlispor (R)	40	6	10	24	38	77	−39	28	Relegation to TFF First League

Source: Süper Lig, Soccerway
Rules for classification: 1) Points; 2) Head-to-head points; 3) Head-to-head goal difference; 4) Head-to-head goals scored; 5) Goal difference; 6) Goals scored; 7) Play-off.
(C) Champions; (R) Relegated

=== 1.Lig ===
Pos	Team	Pld	W	D	L	GF	GA	GD	Pts	Qualification or relegation
1	Adana Demirspor (C, P)	34	21	7	6	64	27	+37	70	Promotion to the Süper Lig
2	Giresunspor (P)	34	21	7	6	54	25	+29	70	Promotion to the Süper Lig
3	Samsunspor	34	20	10	4	58	30	+28	70	Qualification for the Süper Lig Playoffs
4	İstanbulspor	34	19	7	8	62	34	+28	64	Qualification for the Süper Lig Playoffs
5	Altay (O, P)	34	20	3	11	66	39	+27	63	Qualification for the Süper Lig Playoffs
6	Altınordu	34	17	9	8	58	45	+13	60	Qualification for the Süper Lig Playoffs
7	Ankara Keçiörengücü	34	17	7	10	49	28	+21	58	
8	Ümraniyespor	34	14	9	11	46	43	+3	51	
9	Tuzlaspor	34	14	5	15	46	53	−7	47	
10	Bursaspor	34	14	4	16	56	57	−1	46	
11	Bandırmaspor	34	12	6	16	48	51	−3	42	
12	Boluspor	34	12	6	16	38	41	−3	42	
13	Balıkesirspor	34	9	8	17	35	53	−18	35	
14	Adanaspor	34	9	7	18	44	55	−11	34	
15	Menemenspor	34	7	13	14	38	62	−24	34	
16	Akhisarspor (R)	34	8	6	20	36	59	−23	30	Relegation to the TFF Second League
17	Ankaraspor (R)	34	6	8	20	33	61	−28	26	Relegation to the TFF Second League
18	Eskişehirspor (Note: Eskişehirspor have been deducted 3 points.) (R)	34	1	8	25	23	91	−68	8	Relegation to the TFF Second League

Source: TFF
Rules for classification: 1) Points; 2) Head-to-head points; 3) Head-to-head goal difference; 4) Head-to-head goals scored; 5) Goal difference; 6) Goals scored
(C) Champions; (O) Play-off winners; (P) Promoted; (R) Relegated

== Turkish Cup ==
=== Final ===
18 May 2021
20:45 TRT

Antalyaspor	0–2	Beşiktaş
	Report	De Souza 3'; Rosier 30'

Gürsel Aksel Stadium, İzmir
Referee: Ali Palabıyık

== National team ==
=== Friendlies ===
7 October 2020 Friendly	Germany	3–3	Turkey	Cologne, Germany
20:45 UTC+2	Draxler 45+1'; Neuhaus 58'; Waldschmidt 81'		Tufan 49'; Karaca 67'; Karaman 90+4'	Stadium: RheinEnergieStadion; Attendance: 300; Referee: Benoît Bastien (France)

11 November 2020 Friendly	Turkey	3–3	Croatia	Istanbul, Turkey
20:45 UTC+3	Tosun 23' (pen.); Türüç 41'; Ünder 58'		Budimir 32'; Pašalić 53'; Brekalo 56'	Stadium: Vodafone Park; Attendance: 0 Referee: Slavko Vinčić (Slovenia)

27 May 2021 Friendly	Turkey	2–1	Azerbaijan	Alanya, Antalya, Turkey
20:00 UTC+3	Dervişoğlu 34'; Ayhan 44'		Mahmudov 28'	Stadium: Bahçeşehir Okulları Stadium; Referee: Genc Nuza (Kosovo)

31 May 2021 Friendly	Turkey	0–0	Guinea	Antalya, Turkey
20:00 UTC+3				Stadium: Antalya Stadium; Referee: Aliyar Aghayev (Azerbaijan)

3 June 2021 Friendly	Turkey	2–0	Moldova	Paderborn, Germany
19:00 UTC+2	Yılmaz 58'; Ünder 77'			Stadium: Benteler-Arena; Referee: Sascha Stegemann (Germany)

=== 2020–21 UEFA Nations League ===
Pos	Team	Pld	W	D	L	GF	GA	GD	Pts	Promotion or relegation	(Hungary)	(Russia)	(Serbia)	(Turkey)
1	Hungary (P)	6	3	2	1	7	4	+3	11	Promotion to League A	—	2–3	1–1	2–0
2	Russia	6	2	2	2	9	12	−3	8		0–0	—	3–1	1–1
3	Serbia	6	1	3	2	9	7	+2	6 (Note: Tied on head-to-head points (2) and head-to-head goal difference (0). Head-to-head away goals: Serbia 2, Turkey 0.)		0–1	5–0	—	0–0
4	Turkey (R)	6	1	3	2	6	8	−2	6	Relegation to League C	0–1	3–2	2–2	—

Source: UEFA
Rules for classification: Tiebreakers
(P) Promoted; (R) Relegated
Notes:

3 September 2020 2020–21 UEFA Nations League	Turkey	0–1	Hungary	Sivas, Turkey
21:45 UTC+3		Report	Szoboszlai 80'	Stadium: Sivas 4 Eylül Stadium; Attendance: 0 Referee: Artur Soares Dias (Portugal)

6 September 2020 2020–21 UEFA Nations League	Serbia	0–0	Turkey	Belgrade, Serbia
20:45 UTC+2		Report		Stadium: Red Star Stadium; Attendance: 0 Referee: Aleksei Kulbakov (Belarus)

11 October 2020 2020–21 UEFA Nations League	Russia	1–1	Turkey	Moscow, Russia
21:45 UTC+3	Miranchuk 28'	Report	Karaman 62'	Stadium: VTB Arena; Referee: Matej Jug (Slovenia)

14 October 2020 2020–21 UEFA Nations League	Turkey	2–2	Serbia	Istanbul, Turkey
21:45 UTC+3	Çalhanoğlu 57'; Tufan 76'	Report	Milinković-Savić 22'; A. Mitrović 49' (pen.)	Stadium: Türk Telekom Stadium; Referee: Georgi Kabakov (Bulgaria)

15 November 2020 2020–21 UEFA Nations League	Turkey	3–2	Russia	Istanbul, Turkey
20:00 UTC+3	Karaman 26'; Ünder 32'; Tosun 52' (pen.)	Report	Cheryshev 11'; Kuzyayev 57'	Stadium: Şükrü Saracoğlu Stadium; Referee: Szymon Marciniak (Poland)

18 November 2020 2020–21 UEFA Nations League	Hungary	2–0	Turkey	Budapest, Hungary
20:45 UTC+2	Sigér 57'; Varga 90+5'	Report		Stadium: Puskás Aréna; Referee: Ivan Kružliak (Slovakia)

=== 2022 FIFA World Cup qualification ===
Pos	Team	Pld	W	D	L	GF	GA	GD	Pts	Qualification	Netherlands	Turkey	Norway	Montenegro	Latvia	Gibraltar
1	Netherlands	10	7	2	1	33	8	+25	23	Qualification for 2022 FIFA World Cup	—	6–1	2–0	4–0	2–0	6–0
2	Turkey	10	6	3	1	27	16	+11	21	Advance to play-offs	4–2	—	1–1	2–2	3–3	6–0
3	Norway	10	5	3	2	15	8	+7	18		1–1	0–3	—	2–0	0–0	5–1
4	Montenegro	10	3	3	4	14	15	−1	12		2–2	1–2	0–1	—	0–0	4–1
5	Latvia	10	2	3	5	11	14	−3	9		0–1	1–2	0–2	1–2	—	3–1
6	Gibraltar	10	0	0	10	4	43	−39	0		0–7	0–3	0–3	0–3	1–3	—

Source: FIFA, UEFA
Rules for classification: Tiebreakers

24 March 2021 2022 FIFA World Cup Q	Turkey	4–2	Netherlands	Istanbul, Turkey
20:00 UTC+3	Yılmaz 15', 34' (pen.), 81'; Çalhanoğlu 46'	Report (FIFA); Report (UEFA)	Klaassen 75'; L. de Jong 77'	Stadium: Atatürk Olympic Stadium; Referee: Michael Oliver (England)

27 March 2021 2022 FIFA World Cup Q	Norway	0–3	Turkey	Málaga, Spain
18:00 UTC+2		Report (FIFA); Report (UEFA)	Tufan 4', 59'; Söyüncü 28'	Stadium: La Rosaleda Stadium; Referee: Alejandro Hernández (Spain)

30 March 2021 2022 FIFA World Cup Q	Turkey	3–3	Latvia	Istanbul, Turkey
21:45 UTC+3	Karaman 2'; Çalhanoğlu 33'; Yılmaz 52' (pen.)	Report (FIFA); Report (UEFA)	Savaļnieks 35'; Uldriķis 58'; D. Ikaunieks 79'	Stadium: Atatürk Olympic Stadium; Referee: Daniel Stefanski (Poland)

=== UEFA Euro 2020 ===
Pos	Team	Pld	W	D	L	GF	GA	GD	Pts	Qualification
1	Italy (H)	3	3	0	0	7	0	+7	9	Advance to knockout stage
2	Wales	3	1	1	1	3	2	+1	4 (Note: Tied on head-to-head result (Wales 1–1 Switzerland). Overall goal difference was used as the tiebreaker.)	Advance to knockout stage
3	Switzerland	3	1	1	1	4	5	−1	4	Advance to knockout stage
4	Turkey	3	0	0	3	1	8	−7	0	

Source: UEFA
Rules for classification: Group stage tiebreakers
(H) Hosts
Notes:

11 June 2021 UEFA Euro 2020	Turkey	0–3	Italy	Rome, Italy
21:00 UTC+2		Report	Demiral 53' (o.g.); Immobile 66'; Insigne 79'	Stadium: Stadio Olimpico; Referee: Danny Makkelie (Netherlands)

16 June 2021 UEFA Euro 2020	Turkey	0–2	Wales	Baku, Azerbaijan
20:00 UTC+4		Report	Ramsey 42'; C. Roberts 90+5'	Stadium: Baku Olympic Stadium; Referee: Artur Soares Dias (Portugal)

20 June 2021 UEFA Euro 2020	Switzerland	3–1	Turkey	Baku, Azerbaijan
20:00 UTC+4	Seferovic 6'; Shaqiri 26', 68'	Report	Kahveci 62'	Stadium: Baku Olympic Stadium; Referee: Slavko Vinčić (Slovenia)

== Turkish clubs in Europe ==
=== UEFA Champions League ===
==== Second qualifying round ====
Team 1	Score	Team 2
PAOK (Greece)	3–1	(Turkey) Beşiktaş

==== Group stage ====
===== Group H =====
Pos	Team	Pld	W	D	L	GF	GA	GD	Pts	Qualification	PAR	RBL	MUN	IBS
1	(France) Paris Saint-Germain	6	4	0	2	13	6	+7	12 (Note: Tied on head-to-head points (3). Head-to-head away goals: Paris Saint-Germain 1, RB Leipzig 0.)	Advance to knockout phase	—	1–0	1–2	5–1
2	(Germany) RB Leipzig	6	4	0	2	11	12	−1	12	Advance to knockout phase	2–1	—	3–2	2–0
3	(England) Manchester United	6	3	0	3	15	10	+5	9	Transfer to Europa League	1–3	5–0	—	4–1
4	(Turkey) İstanbul Başakşehir	6	1	0	5	7	18	−11	3		0–2	3–4	2–1	—

Source: UEFA
Rules for classification: Group stage tiebreakers

=== UEFA Europa League ===
==== Second qualifying round ====
Team 1	Score	Team 2
Neftçi (Azerbaijan)	1–3	(Turkey) Galatasaray

==== Third qualifying round ====
Team 1	Score	Team 2
Rosenborg (Norway)	1–0	(Turkey) Alanyaspor
Beşiktaş (Turkey)	1–1 (a.e.t.) (2–4 p)	(Portugal) Rio Ave
Galatasaray (Turkey)	2–0	(Croatia) Hajduk Split

==== Play-off round ====
Team 1	Score	Team 2
Rangers (Scotland)	2–1	(Turkey) Galatasaray

==== Group stage ====
===== Group I =====
Pos	Team	Pld	W	D	L	GF	GA	GD	Pts	Qualification	VIL	MTA	SIV	QRB
1	(Spain) Villarreal	6	5	1	0	17	5	+12	16	Advance to knockout phase	—	4–0	5–3	3–0 (Note: The Villarreal v Qarabağ match was awarded as a 3–0 win to Villarreal after being cancelled as several players of the Qarabağ squad tested positive for the SARS-CoV-2.)
2	(Israel) Maccabi Tel Aviv	6	3	2	1	6	7	−1	11	Advance to knockout phase	1–1	—	1–0	1–0
3	(Turkey) Sivasspor	6	2	0	4	9	11	−2	6		0–1	1–2	—	2–0
4	(Azerbaijan) Qarabağ	6	0	1	5	4	13	−9	1		1–3	1–1	2–3	—

Source: UEFA
Rules for classification: Group stage tiebreakers
