= Alexander Sørloth =

Norwegian footballer (born 1995)

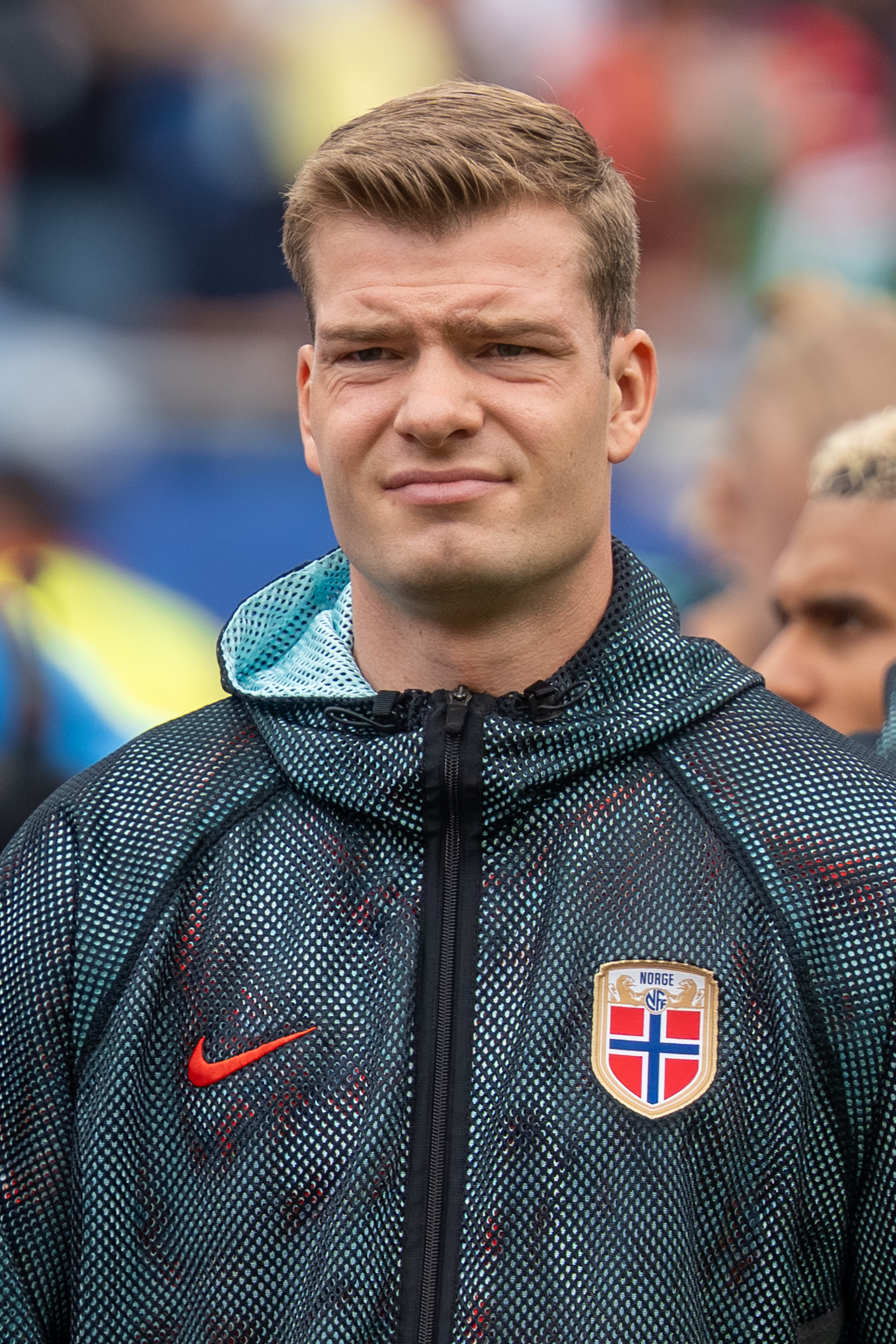
- Sørloth with Norway in 2026

Personal information
- Full name: Alexander Sørloth
- Date of birth: 5 December 1995 (age 30)
- Place of birth: Trondheim, Norway
- Height: 1.96 m (6 ft 5 in)
- Positions: Striker; right winger

Team information
- Current team: Atlético Madrid
- Number: 9

Youth career
- Strindheim
- Rosenborg

Senior career*
Years	Team	Apps	(Gls)
2012–2015	Rosenborg 2	46	(18)
2013–2015	Rosenborg	6	(0)
2015	→ Bodø/Glimt (loan)	26	(13)
2016–2017	Groningen	38	(5)
2017–2018	Midtjylland	19	(10)
2018–2020	Crystal Palace	16	(0)
2019	→ Gent (loan)	19	(4)
2019–2020	→ Trabzonspor (loan)	34	(24)
2020–2023	RB Leipzig	30	(5)
2021–2023	→ Real Sociedad (loan)	67	(16)
2023–2024	Villarreal	34	(23)
2024–	Atlético Madrid	74	(33)

International career^{‡}
2011–2012	Norway U16	3	(0)
2012–2013	Norway U17	3	(0)
2013–2014	Norway U18	11	(5)
2014–2015	Norway U19	3	(1)
2015–2016	Norway U21	10	(1)
2016–	Norway	78	(26)
- * Club domestic league appearances and goals as of 10:36, 12 November 2026 (UTC) ‡ National team caps and goals as of 21:43, 17 November 2026 (UTC)

Alexander Sørloth (born 5 December 1995) is a Norwegian professional footballer who plays as a striker for La Liga club Atlético Madrid and the Norway national team.

The son of former Norwegian international striker Gøran Sørloth, Sørloth started his career at Rosenborg, before spending a loan period at Bodø/Glimt in 2015. Following this, he transferred to Groningen in the Netherlands and then to Midtjylland in Denmark. In 2018, he joined Crystal Palace in England, followed by loan spells at Gent in Belgium and Trabzonspor in Turkey. He moved to RB Leipzig in Germany in 2020 and later spent two seasons on loan at Real Sociedad in Spain. In 2023, he joined Villarreal, before transferring to Atlético Madrid in 2024.

== Club career ==
=== Rosenborg ===
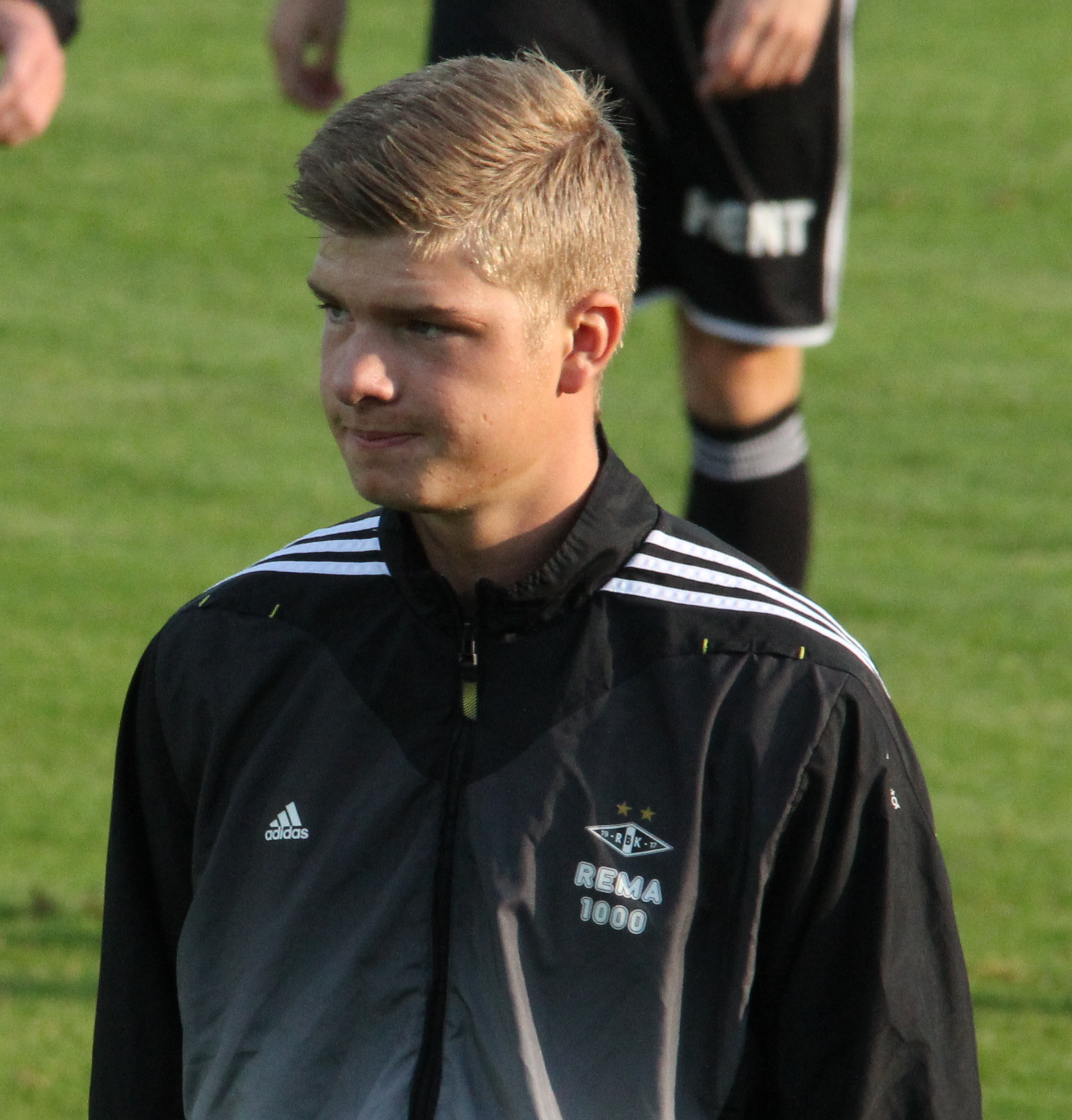
Sørloth with Rosenborg in 2013

After many years in the youth system, Sørloth was rewarded with a contract by Rosenborg in July 2013. He played his first professional game for Rosenborg when he was subbed on in the second half of the Europa League first qualifying round game versus Crusaders, and it took him only 12 minutes to score his first goal, Rosenborg's 6th in their 7–2 win.

Sørloth made his debut in the Tippeligaen on 20 July 2014 in Rosenborg's home game against Sogndal coming on as a substitute for Alexander Søderlund after 60 minutes.

Sørloth went on a loan to Bodø/Glimt before the start of the 2015 Tippeligaen. In the league he scored 13 goals and making five assists in his 26 appearances (19 starters). In his last match for Bodø/Glimt, he scored his second hat-trick of the season, against Stabæk.

=== Groningen ===
On 6 November 2015, Sørloth confirmed that he would be joining Eredivisie club Groningen on a 4.5-year contract at the end of the season. Groningen paid a transfer fee of around €750,000.

=== Midtjylland ===
On 1 June 2017, Danish Superliga club Midtjylland announced that they had signed Sørloth on a four-year contract for what the club called a 'modest fee'. In September 2017 he was named the Superliga Player of the Month.

=== Crystal Palace ===
On 31 January 2018, Sørloth signed for Premier League club Crystal Palace for a reported fee of £9 million. This made him the most expensive sale out of the Danish Superliga at the time. He made his debut on 10 February 2018 in a 3–1 away defeat to Everton. At the time of the transfer, he was the top scorer in the Superliga, and would go on to win the title at the end of the season. On 28 August, Sørloth scored his first and only goal for Palace in a 1–0 win over Swansea City in the EFL Cup.

==== Loan to Gent ====
On 8 January 2019, Sørloth signed for Belgian First Division A side Gent on loan until the end of the 2018–19 season.

==== Loan to Trabzonspor ====
In August 2019, Sørloth signed for Turkish club Trabzonspor on loan until the end of the 2019–20 season. He debuted for the club on 8 August against Sparta Prague in the third qualifying round of the UEFA Europa League, where he scored the second goal in a match that ended 2–2.

In March 2020, Sørloth scored his first hat-trick for Trabzonspor in a 6–0 Süper Lig victory against Kasimpasa. On 5 July 2020, Sørloth became Trabzonspor's top-scoring foreign player in a single season, with 29 goals, exceeding the tally of Georgian former center-forward Shota Arveladze.

=== RB Leipzig ===
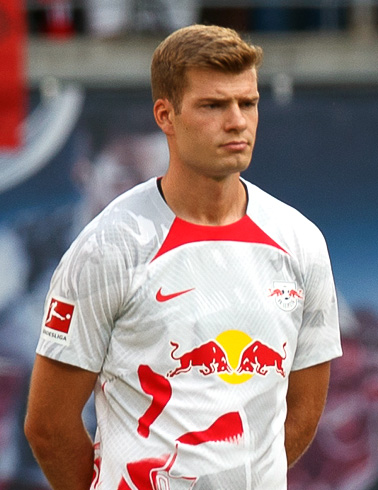
Sørloth lining up for RB Leipzig in 2022

After playing for his national team in the first two group matches of the UEFA Nations League, Sørloth failed to return to Trabzon prior to Trabzonspor's upcoming league fixture against Beşiktaş. On 22 September 2020, Sørloth signed for RB Leipzig for an initial fee of €20 million plus €2 million in potential add-ons, with any proceeds to be shared evenly between Trabzonspor and Crystal Palace. On 2 December 2020, he scored the game-winning goal against İstanbul Başakşehir in a 4–3 win in the 2020–21 UEFA Champions League, which was his first goal for the club.

==== Loan to Real Sociedad ====
On 25 August 2021, Sørloth moved to La Liga side Real Sociedad on a season-long loan deal. On 29 August 2022, he returned to the Txuri-urdin on loan for another year.

=== Villarreal ===
On 25 July 2023, La Liga club Villarreal announced the signing of Sørloth on a five-year deal, for a reported fee of €10 million. On 27 August, he scored his first goal for the club in a 4–3 loss to Barcelona. On 19 May 2024, he scored four goals in a 4–4 draw in a league game against Real Madrid, reaching his 23rd goal, without penalty kicks, of the 2023–24 season as La Liga's top scorer with one match remaining. He was eventually surpassed by just one goal by Artem Dovbyk, who scored a hat-trick on the final matchday of the season.

=== Atlético Madrid ===
On 3 August 2024, Sørloth transferred to fellow La Liga club Atlético Madrid for a fee in the region of €32 million. He signed a four-year contract. A few weeks later, on 19 August, he scored his first goal on his debut in a 2–2 away draw against his former club Villarreal. Later that year, on 21 December, he netted a stoppage-time goal in a 2–1 victory over Barcelona, securing his club's first away win over the latter since February 2006.

On 10 May 2025, Sørloth scored a first-half quadruple against his former club, Real Sociedad, including a hat-trick within four minutes, breaking the previous record held by David Villa in 2006. In addition, he became the first player in La Liga history to achieve a hat-trick before the 12th minute, adding a fourth goal in the 30th minute. He concluded his debut season with 20 goals, finishing as his club's top scorer in La Liga.

On 24 February 2026, he scored his first Champions League hat-trick in a 4–1 win over Club Brugge, securing his club's qualification to the round of 16. On 8 April 2026, he scored the club’s second goal in a 2–0 win against Barcelona in the Champions League quarter-finals.

== International career ==
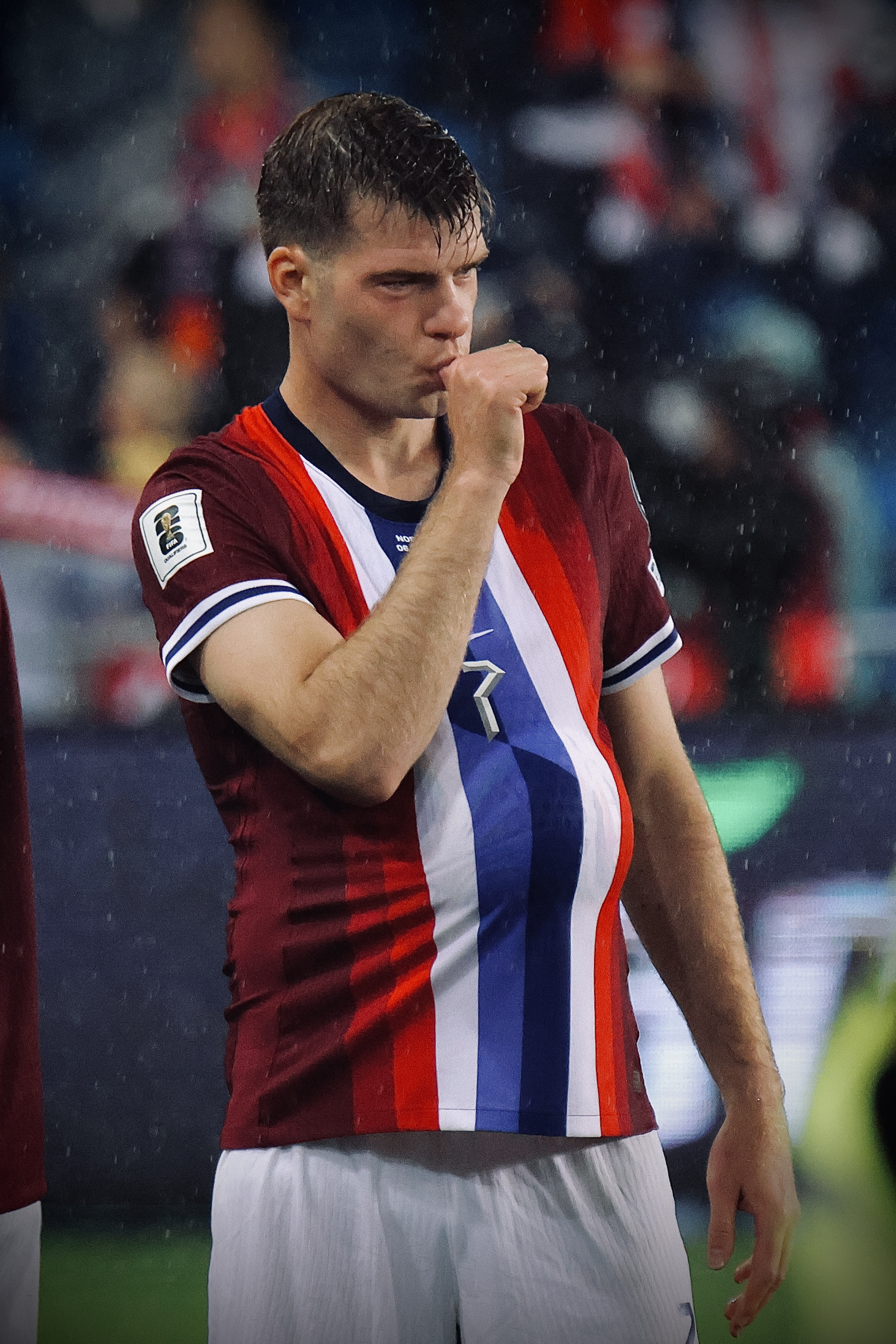
Sørloth with Norway in 2025

Sørloth debuted for the Norwegian senior squad against Portugal on 29 May 2016. He scored his first goal against Iceland the same year on 1 June.

Sørloth started all matches in the 2026 World Cup qualifiers, where he scored five goals and provided two assists. On 21 May 2026, Sørloth was included in the 26-man squad selected by Norway national team manager Ståle Solbakken for the 2026 FIFA World Cup. In the 2–1 quarter-final loss against England on 11 July, Sørloth explained his decision not to pass to Erling Haaland in a key chance to extend Norway's lead, stating that he chose to shoot after believing the passing lane was blocked. He later faced criticism and death threats on social media.

== Personal life ==
On 31 May 2021, an Instagram post of Sørloth's surpassed 3.5 million comments, making it the most commented post on Instagram by an athlete. It was mainly fans of the Turkish football club Trabzonspor, asking the player to return to his former loan club.

== Career statistics ==
=== Club ===
As of match played 8 November 2026

Appearances and goals by club, season and competition
Club	Season	League			National cup (Note: Includes Norwegian Cup, KNVB Cup, Danish Cup, FA Cup, Belgian Cup, Turkish Cup, DFB-Pokal, Copa del Rey)		League cup (Note: Includes EFL Cup)		Europe		Other		Total	
Club	Season	Division	Apps	Goals	Apps	Goals	Apps	Goals	Apps	Goals	Apps	Goals	Apps	Goals
Rosenborg	2013	Tippeligaen	0		0		—		1 (Note: Appearance(s) in UEFA Europa League)	1	—		1	1
Rosenborg	2014	Tippeligaen	6	0	0		—		3	0	—		9	0
Rosenborg	2015	Tippeligaen	0		0		—		0	0	—		0	0
Rosenborg	Total		6	0	0		—		4	1	—		10	1
Bodø/Glimt (loan)	2015	Tippeligaen	26	13	3	1	—						29	14
Groningen	2015–16	Eredivisie	13	2	0		—				2 (Note: Appearances in Eredivisie European play-offs)	0	15	2
Groningen	2016–17	Eredivisie	25	3	1	1	—				2	0	28	4
Groningen	Total		38	5	1	1	—		0		4	0	43	6
Midtjylland	2017–18	Danish Superliga	19	10	1	1	—		6	4	—		26	15
Crystal Palace	2017–18	Premier League	4	0	—		—		—		—		4	0
Crystal Palace	2018–19	Premier League	12	0	1	0	3	1	—		—		16	1
Crystal Palace	Total		16	0	1	0	3	1	—		—		20	1
Gent (loan)	2018–19	Belgian Pro League	19	4	3	1	—		—		—		22	5
Trabzonspor (loan)	2019–20	Süper Lig	34	24	7	7	—		8	2	—		49	33
RB Leipzig	2020–21	Bundesliga	29	5	4	0	—		4 (Note: Appearances in UEFA Champions League)	1	—		37	6
RB Leipzig	2022–23	Bundesliga	1	0	—		—		—		0		1	0
RB Leipzig	Total		30	5	4	0	—		4	1	0		38	6
Real Sociedad (loan)	2021–22	La Liga	33	4	4	2	—		7	2	—		44	8
Real Sociedad (loan)	2022–23	La Liga	34	12	5	2	—		7	2	—		46	16
Real Sociedad (loan)	Total		67	16	9	4	—		14	4	—		90	24
Villarreal	2023–24	La Liga	34	23	1	0	—		6	3	—		41	26
Atlético Madrid	2024–25	La Liga	35	20	7	4	—		8	0	3 (Note: Appearances in FIFA Club World Cup)	0	53	24
Atlético Madrid	2025–26	La Liga	35	13	4	0	—		14	6	1 (Note: Appearance in Supercopa de España)	1	54	20
Atlético Madrid	2026–27	La Liga	4	0	0	0	—		2	0	0	0	6	0
Atlético Madrid	Total	La Liga	74	33	11	4	—		24	6	4	1	113	44
Career total			363	133	41	19	3	1	66	21	7	1	481	175

=== International ===
As of match played 17 November 2026

Appearances and goals by national team and year
National team	Year	Apps	Goals
Norway	2016	7	1
Norway	2017	5	0
Norway	2018	5	1
Norway	2019	5	4
Norway	2020	5	3
Norway	2021	9	3
Norway	2022	9	3
Norway	2023	6	2
Norway	2024	8	4
Norway	2025	9	5
Norway	2026	10	0
Total		78	26

As of match played 23 June 2026. Norway score listed first, score column indicates score after each Sørloth goal.

List of international goals scored by Alexander Sørloth
No.	Date	Venue	Opponent	Score	Result	Competition
1	1 June 2016	Ullevaal Stadion, Oslo, Norway	Iceland	3–1	3–2	Friendly
2	2 June 2018	Laugardalsvöllur, Reykjavík, Iceland	Iceland	3–2	3–2	Friendly
3	15 October 2019	Arena Națională, Bucharest, Romania	Romania	1–1	1–1	UEFA Euro 2020 qualifying
4	15 November 2019	Ullevaal Stadion, Oslo, Norway	Faroe Islands	3–0	4–0	UEFA Euro 2020 qualifying
5	15 November 2019	Ullevaal Stadion, Oslo, Norway	Faroe Islands	4–0	4–0	UEFA Euro 2020 qualifying
6	18 November 2019	National Stadium, Ta' Qali, Malta	Malta	2–1	2–1	UEFA Euro 2020 qualifying
7	7 September 2020	Windsor Park, Belfast, Northern Ireland	Northern Ireland	3–1	5–1	2020–21 UEFA Nations League B
8	7 September 2020	Windsor Park, Belfast, Northern Ireland	Northern Ireland	4–1	5–1	2020–21 UEFA Nations League B
9	11 October 2020	Ullevaal Stadion, Oslo, Norway	Romania	2–0	4–0	2020–21 UEFA Nations League B
10	24 March 2021	Ullevaal Stadion, Oslo, Norway	Gibraltar	1–0	3–0	2022 FIFA World Cup qualification
11	30 March 2021	Podgorica City Stadium, Podgorica, Montenegro	Montenegro	1–0	1–0	2022 FIFA World Cup qualification
12	7 September 2021	Ullevaal Stadion, Oslo, Norway	Gibraltar	4–1	5–1	2022 FIFA World Cup qualification
13	29 March 2022	Ullevaal Stadion, Oslo, Norway	Armenia	8–0	9–0	Friendly
14	12 June 2022	Ullevaal Stadion, Oslo, Norway	Sweden	3–1	3–2	2022–23 UEFA Nations League B
15	20 November 2022	Ullevaal Stadion, Oslo, Norway	Finland	1–1	1–1	Friendly
16	28 March 2023	Batumi Stadium, Batumi, Georgia	Georgia	1–0	1–1	UEFA Euro 2024 qualifying
17	12 October 2023	AEK Arena, Larnaca, Cyprus	Cyprus	1–0	4–0	UEFA Euro 2024 qualifying
18	26 March 2024	Ullevaal Stadion, Oslo, Norway	Slovakia	1–0	1–1	Friendly
19	10 October 2024	Ullevaal Stadion, Oslo, Norway	Slovenia	2–0	3–0	2024–25 UEFA Nations League B
20	13 October 2024	Raiffeisen Arena, Linz, Austria	Austria	1–1	1–5	2024–25 UEFA Nations League B
21	17 November 2024	Ullevaal Stadion, Oslo, Norway	Kazakhstan	3–0	5–0	2024–25 UEFA Nations League B
22	22 March 2025	Zimbru Stadium, Chișinău, Moldova	Moldova	4–0	5–0	2026 FIFA World Cup qualification
23	25 March 2025	Nagyerdei Stadion, Debrecen, Hungary	Israel	2–1	4–2	2026 FIFA World Cup qualification
24	6 June 2025	Ullevaal Stadion, Oslo, Norway	Italy	1–0	3–0	2026 FIFA World Cup qualification
25	13 November 2025	Ullevaal Stadion, Oslo, Norway	Estonia	1–0	4–1	2026 FIFA World Cup qualification
26	13 November 2025	Ullevaal Stadion, Oslo, Norway	Estonia	2–0	4–1	2026 FIFA World Cup qualification

== Honours ==
Midtjylland

- Danish Superliga: 2017–18

Trabzonspor

- Turkish Cup: 2019–20

RB Leipzig

- DFB-Pokal runner-up: 2020–21

Atlético Madrid

- Copa del Rey runner-up: 2025–26

Individual

- Süper Lig top scorer: 2019–20
- Turkish Cup top scorer: 2019–20
- La Liga Player of the Month: January 2023
