= Marko Simić =

Marko Simić may refer to:

- Marko Simić (footballer, born 1987), Montenegrin football defender
- Marko Simić (footballer, born 1993), Serbian football forward

== See also ==
- Marko Šimić (disambiguation)
