= 2022 FIFA World Cup qualification – UEFA Group G =

The 2022 FIFA World Cup qualification UEFA Group G was one of the ten UEFA groups in the World Cup qualification tournament to decide which teams would qualify for the 2022 FIFA World Cup finals tournament in Qatar. Group G consisted of six teams: Gibraltar, Latvia, Montenegro, the Netherlands, Norway and Turkey. The teams played against each other home-and-away in a round-robin format.

The group winners, Netherlands, qualified directly for the World Cup finals, while the runners-up, Turkey, advanced to the second round (play-offs).

== Standings ==
Pos	Team	Pld	W	D	L	GF	GA	GD	Pts	Qualification	Netherlands	Turkey	Norway	Montenegro	Latvia	Gibraltar
1	Netherlands	10	7	2	1	33	8	+25	23	Qualification for 2022 FIFA World Cup	—	6–1	2–0	4–0	2–0	6–0
2	Turkey	10	6	3	1	27	16	+11	21	Advance to play-offs	4–2	—	1–1	2–2	3–3	6–0
3	Norway	10	5	3	2	15	8	+7	18		1–1	0–3	—	2–0	0–0	5–1
4	Montenegro	10	3	3	4	14	15	−1	12		2–2	1–2	0–1	—	0–0	4–1
5	Latvia	10	2	3	5	11	14	−3	9		0–1	1–2	0–2	1–2	—	3–1
6	Gibraltar	10	0	0	10	4	43	−39	0		0–7	0–3	0–3	0–3	1–3	—

Source: FIFA, UEFA
Rules for classification: Tiebreakers

== Matches ==
The fixture list was confirmed by UEFA on 8 December 2020, the day following the draw. Times are CET/CEST, (Note: CET (UTC+1) for matches until 27 March and from 31 October (matchday 1–2 and 9–10), and CEST (UTC+2) for matches from 28 March to 30 October 2021 (matchday 3–8).) as listed by UEFA (local times, if different, are in parentheses).

24 March 2021
18:00 (20:00 UTC+3)

Turkey	4–2	Netherlands
Yılmaz 15', 34' (pen.), 81'; Çalhanoğlu 46'	Report (FIFA); Report (UEFA)	Klaassen 75'; L. de Jong 76'

Atatürk Olympic Stadium, Istanbul
Attendance: 0 (Note: Due to the COVID-19 pandemic in Europe, the match was played behind closed doors.)
Referee: Michael Oliver (England)
24 March 2021
20:45

Gibraltar	0–3	Norway
	Report (FIFA); Report (UEFA)	Sørloth 43'; Thorstvedt 45'; Svensson 57'

Victoria Stadium, Gibraltar
Attendance: 0
Referee: Duje Strukan (Croatia)
24 March 2021
20:45 (21:45 UTC+2)

Latvia	1–2	Montenegro
J. Ikaunieks 40'	Report (FIFA); Report (UEFA)	Jovetić 41', 83'

Skonto Stadium, Riga
Attendance: 0
Referee: Alain Durieux (Luxembourg)

27 March 2021
15:00

Montenegro	4–1	Gibraltar
Bećiraj 25'; Simić 43'; Tomašević 53'; Jovetić 80'	Report (FIFA); Report (UEFA)	Styche 30' (pen.)

City Stadium, Podgorica
Attendance: 0
Referee: Manuel Schüttengruber (Austria)
27 March 2021
18:00

Netherlands	2–0	Latvia
Berghuis 32'; L. de Jong 69'	Report (FIFA); Report (UEFA)

Johan Cruyff Arena, Amsterdam
Attendance: 5,000
Referee: Stéphanie Frappart (France)
27 March 2021
18:00

Norway	0–3	Turkey
	Report (FIFA); Report (UEFA)	Tufan 4', 59'; Söyüncü 28'

La Rosaleda, Málaga (Spain) (Note: The Norway v Turkey match, originally to be played at Ullevaal Stadion, Oslo, was moved to Estadio La Rosaleda, Málaga (Spain), due to the travel ban in response to the COVID-19 pandemic in Norway.)
Attendance: 0
Referee: Alejandro Hernández Hernández (Spain)

30 March 2021
20:45

Gibraltar	0–7	Netherlands
	Report (FIFA); Report (UEFA)	Berghuis 42'; L. de Jong 55'; Depay 61', 88'; Wijnaldum 62'; Malen 64'; Van de Beek 85'

Victoria Stadium, Gibraltar
Attendance: 335
Referee: João Pinheiro (Portugal)
30 March 2021
20:45

Montenegro	0–1	Norway
	Report (FIFA); Report (UEFA)	Sørloth 35'

City Stadium, Podgorica
Attendance: 0
Referee: Anthony Taylor (England)
30 March 2021
20:45 (21:45 UTC+3)

Turkey	3–3	Latvia
Karaman 2'; Çalhanoğlu 33'; Yılmaz 52' (pen.)	Report (FIFA); Report (UEFA)	Savaļnieks 35'; Uldriķis 58'; D. Ikaunieks 79'

Atatürk Olympic Stadium, Istanbul
Attendance: 223
Referee: Daniel Stefański (Poland)

1 September 2021
20:45 (21:45 UTC+3)

Latvia	3–1	Gibraltar
Gutkovskis 50' (pen.), 85'; Cigaņiks 89'	Report (FIFA); Report (UEFA)	De Barr 71' (pen.)

Daugava Stadium, Riga
Attendance: 1,466
Referee: Pavel Orel (Czech Republic)
1 September 2021
20:45

Norway	1–1	Netherlands
Haaland 20'	Report (FIFA); Report (UEFA)	Klaassen 37'

Ullevaal Stadion, Oslo
Attendance: 6,711
Referee: Szymon Marciniak (Poland)
1 September 2021
20:45 (21:45 UTC+3)

Turkey	2–2	Montenegro
Ünder 9'; Yazıcı 31'	Report (FIFA); Report (UEFA)	Marušić 40'; Radunović 90+7'

Vodafone Park, Istanbul
Attendance: 12,472
Referee: Benoît Bastien (France)

4 September 2021
18:00 (19:00 UTC+3)

Latvia	0–2	Norway
	Report (FIFA); Report (UEFA)	Haaland 20' (pen.); Elyounoussi 66'

Daugava Stadium, Riga
Attendance: 2,520
Referee: David Fuxman (Israel)
4 September 2021
20:45

Gibraltar	0–3	Turkey
	Report (FIFA); Report (UEFA)	Dervişoğlu 54'; Çalhanoğlu 65'; Karaman 83'

Victoria Stadium, Gibraltar
Attendance: 702
Referee: Kristo Tohver (Estonia)
4 September 2021
20:45

Netherlands	4–0	Montenegro
Depay 38' (pen.), 62'; Wijnaldum 70'; Gakpo 76'	Report (FIFA); Report (UEFA)

Philips Stadion, Eindhoven
Attendance: 20,458
Referee: Jesús Gil Manzano (Spain)

7 September 2021
20:45

Montenegro	0–0	Latvia
	Report (FIFA); Report (UEFA)

City Stadium, Podgorica
Attendance: 2,134
Referee: Harm Osmers (Germany)
7 September 2021
20:45

Netherlands	6–1	Turkey
Klaassen 1'; Depay 16', 38' (pen.), 54'; Til 80'; Malen 90'	Report (FIFA); Report (UEFA)	Ünder 90+2'

Johan Cruyff Arena, Amsterdam
Attendance: 31,389
Referee: Daniele Orsato (Italy)
7 September 2021
20:45

Norway	5–1	Gibraltar
Thorstvedt 23'; Haaland 27', 39', 90+1'; Sørloth 59'	Report (FIFA); Report (UEFA)	Styche 43'

Ullevaal Stadion, Oslo
Attendance: 9,442
Referee: Nikolas Neokleous (Cyprus)

8 October 2021
20:45

Gibraltar	0–3	Montenegro
	Report (FIFA); Report (UEFA)	Marušić 7'; Bećiraj 44' (pen.), 68'

Victoria Stadium, Gibraltar
Attendance: 1,351
Referee: Filip Glova (Slovakia)
8 October 2021
20:45 (21:45 UTC+3)

Latvia	0–1	Netherlands
	Report (FIFA); Report (UEFA)	Klaassen 19'

Daugava Stadium, Riga
Attendance: 4,711
Referee: Andrew Madley (England)
8 October 2021
20:45 (21:45 UTC+3)

Turkey	1–1	Norway
Aktürkoğlu 6'	Report (FIFA); Report (UEFA)	Thorstvedt 41'

Şükrü Saracoğlu Stadium, Istanbul
Attendance: 21,408
Referee: Felix Brych (Germany)

11 October 2021
20:45 (21:45 UTC+3)

Latvia	1–2	Turkey
Demiral 70' (o.g.)	Report (FIFA); Report (UEFA)	Dursun 76'; Yılmaz 90+9' (pen.)

Daugava Stadium, Riga
Attendance: 2,453
Referee: Andreas Ekberg (Sweden)
11 October 2021
20:45

Netherlands	6–0	Gibraltar
Van Dijk 9'; Depay 21', 45+3' (pen.); Dumfries 48'; Danjuma 75'; Malen 86'	Report (FIFA); Report (UEFA)

Stadion Feijenoord, Rotterdam
Attendance: 31,583
Referee: Vitali Meshkov (Russia)
11 October 2021
20:45

Norway	2–0	Montenegro
Elyounoussi 29', 90+6'	Report (FIFA); Report (UEFA)

Ullevaal Stadion, Oslo
Attendance: 23,748
Referee: István Kovács (Romania)

13 November 2021
18:00

Norway	0–0	Latvia
	Report (FIFA); Report (UEFA)

Ullevaal Stadion, Oslo
Attendance: 24,376
Referee: Lawrence Visser (Belgium)
13 November 2021
18:00 (20:00 UTC+3)

Turkey	6–0	Gibraltar
Aktürkoğlu 11'; Dervişoğlu 38', 41'; Demiral 65'; Dursun 81'; Müldür 84'	Report (FIFA); Report (UEFA)

Başakşehir Fatih Terim Stadium, Istanbul
Attendance: 8,895
Referee: Serhiy Boyko (Ukraine)
13 November 2021
20:45

Montenegro	2–2	Netherlands
Vukotić 82'; Vujnović 86'	Report (FIFA); Report (UEFA)	Depay 25' (pen.), 54'

City Stadium, Podgorica
Attendance: 1,844
Referee: Carlos del Cerro Grande (Spain)

16 November 2021
20:45

Gibraltar	1–3	Latvia
Walker 7'	Report (FIFA); Report (UEFA)	Gutkovskis 25'; Uldriķis 55'; Krollis 75'

Victoria Stadium, Gibraltar
Attendance: 1,130
Referee: Espen Eskås (Norway)
16 November 2021
20:45

Montenegro	1–2	Turkey
Bećiraj 4'	Report (FIFA); Report (UEFA)	Aktürkoğlu 22'; Kökçü 60'

City Stadium, Podgorica
Attendance: 2,885
Referee: Daniel Siebert (Germany)
16 November 2021
20:45

Netherlands	2–0	Norway
Bergwijn 84'; Depay 90+1'	Report (FIFA); Report (UEFA)

Stadion Feijenoord, Rotterdam
Attendance: 0
Referee: Clément Turpin (France)

== Goalscorers ==
There were 104 goals scored in 30 matches, for an average of 3.47 goals per match.

12 goals

- (Netherlands national football team) Memphis Depay

5 goals

- (Norway national football team) Erling Haaland
- (Turkey national football team) Burak Yılmaz

4 goals

- (Montenegro national football team) Fatos Bećiraj
- (Netherlands national football team) Davy Klaassen

3 goals

- (Latvia national football team) Vladislavs Gutkovskis
- (Montenegro national football team) Stevan Jovetić
- (Netherlands national football team) Luuk de Jong
- (Netherlands national football team) Donyell Malen
- (Norway national football team) Mohamed Elyounoussi
- (Norway national football team) Alexander Sørloth
- (Norway national football team) Kristian Thorstvedt
- (Turkey national football team) Kerem Aktürkoğlu
- (Turkey national football team) Hakan Çalhanoğlu
- (Turkey national football team) Halil Dervişoğlu

2 goals

- (Gibraltar national football team) Reece Styche
- (Latvia national football team) Roberts Uldriķis
- (Montenegro national football team) Adam Marušić
- (Netherlands national football team) Steven Berghuis
- (Netherlands national football team) Georginio Wijnaldum
- (Turkey national football team) Serdar Dursun
- (Turkey national football team) Kenan Karaman
- (Turkey national football team) Ozan Tufan
- (Turkey national football team) Cengiz Ünder

1 goal

- (Gibraltar national football team) Tjay De Barr
- (Gibraltar national football team) Liam Walker
- (Latvia national football team) Andrejs Cigaņiks
- (Latvia national football team) Dāvis Ikaunieks
- (Latvia national football team) Jānis Ikaunieks
- (Latvia national football team) Raimonds Krollis
- (Latvia national football team) Roberts Savaļnieks
- (Montenegro national football team) Risto Radunović
- (Montenegro national football team) Marko Simić
- (Montenegro national football team) Žarko Tomašević
- (Montenegro national football team) Nikola Vujnović
- (Montenegro national football team) Ilija Vukotić
- (Netherlands national football team) Donny van de Beek
- (Netherlands national football team) Steven Bergwijn
- (Netherlands national football team) Arnaut Danjuma
- (Netherlands national football team) Virgil van Dijk
- (Netherlands national football team) Denzel Dumfries
- (Netherlands national football team) Cody Gakpo
- (Netherlands national football team) Guus Til
- (Norway national football team) Jonas Svensson
- (Turkey national football team) Merih Demiral
- (Turkey national football team) Orkun Kökçü
- (Turkey national football team) Mert Müldür
- (Turkey national football team) Çağlar Söyüncü
- (Turkey national football team) Yusuf Yazıcı

1 own goal

- (Turkey national football team) Merih Demiral (against Latvia)

== Discipline ==
A player was automatically suspended for the next match for the following offences:

- Receiving a red card (red card suspensions could be extended for serious offences)
- Receiving two yellow cards in two different matches (yellow card suspensions were carried forward to the play-offs, but not the finals or any other future international matches)

The following suspensions were served during the qualifying matches:

Team	Player	Offence(s)	Suspended for match(es)
Gibraltar	Louie Annesley	(yellow card) vs Norway (24 March 2021); (yellow card) vs Latvia (1 September 2021)	vs Turkey (4 September 2021)
Gibraltar	Tjay De Barr	(yellow card) vs Netherlands (30 March 2021); (yellow card) vs Turkey (4 September 2021)	vs Norway (7 September 2021)
Gibraltar	Kyle Goldwin	(yellow card) vs Montenegro (27 March 2021); (yellow card) vs Montenegro (8 October 2021)	vs Netherlands (11 October 2021)
Gibraltar	Aymen Mouelhi	(yellow card) vs Norway (24 March 2021); (yellow card) vs Norway (7 September 2021)	vs Montenegro (8 October 2021)
Gibraltar	Jayce Olivero	(red card) vs Turkey (13 November 2021)	vs Latvia (16 November 2021)
Latvia	Antonijs Černomordijs	(yellow card) vs Montenegro (24 March 2021); (yellow card) vs Gibraltar (1 September 2021)	vs Norway (4 September 2021)
Latvia	Eduards Emsis	(yellow card) vs Turkey (30 March 2021); (yellow card) vs Norway (13 November 2021)	vs Gibraltar (16 November 2021)
Latvia	Vladislavs Fjodorovs	(yellow card) vs Turkey (30 March 2021); (yellow card) vs Norway (4 September 2021)	vs Montenegro (7 September 2021)
Latvia	Vladislavs Gutkovskis	(yellow card) vs Norway (4 September 2021); (yellow card) vs Montenegro (7 September 2021)	vs Netherlands (8 October 2021)
Latvia	Vladimirs Kamešs	(yellow card) vs Montenegro (24 March 2021); (yellow card) vs Turkey (30 March 2021)	vs Gibraltar (1 September 2021)
Latvia	Krišs Kārkliņš	(yellow card) vs Montenegro (24 March 2021); (yellow card) vs Netherlands (27 March 2021)	vs Turkey (30 March 2021)
Montenegro	Uroš Đurđević	(yellow card) vs Turkey (1 September 2021); (yellow card) vs Latvia (7 September 2021)	vs Gibraltar (8 October 2021)
Montenegro	Stefan Savić	(yellow card) vs Turkey (1 September 2021); (yellow card) vs Netherlands (4 September 2021)	vs Latvia (7 September 2021)
Montenegro	Marko Vešović	(yellow card) (yellow-red card) vs Norway (11 October 2021)	vs Netherlands (13 November 2021)
Montenegro	Igor Vujačić	(yellow card) vs Latvia (24 March 2021); (yellow card) vs Turkey (1 September 2021)	vs Netherlands (4 September 2021)
Netherlands	Daley Blind	(yellow card) vs Latvia (27 March 2021); (yellow card) vs Norway (1 September 2021)	vs Montenegro (4 September 2021)
Netherlands	Matthijs de Ligt	(red card) vs Czech Republic in UEFA Euro 2020 (27 June 2021)	vs Norway (1 September 2021)
Netherlands	Georginio Wijnaldum	(yellow card) vs Turkey (24 March 2021); (yellow card) vs Turkey (7 September 2021)	vs Latvia (8 October 2021)
Norway	Stian Rode Gregersen	(yellow card) vs Turkey (27 March 2021); (yellow card) vs Montenegro (11 October 2021)	vs Latvia (13 November 2021)
Norway	Alexander Sørloth	(yellow card) vs Turkey (27 March 2021); (yellow card) vs Montenegro (30 March 2021)	vs Netherlands (1 September 2021)
Norway	Morten Thorsby	(yellow card) vs Netherlands (1 September 2021); (yellow card) vs Turkey (8 October 2021)	vs Montenegro (11 October 2021)
Norway	Kristian Thorstvedt	(red card) vs Turkey (27 March 2021)	vs Montenegro (30 March 2021) vs Netherlands (1 September 2021)
Turkey	Ozan Kabak	(yellow card) vs Netherlands (24 March 2021); (yellow card) vs Netherlands (7 September 2021)	vs Norway (8 October 2021)
Turkey	Orkun Kökçü	(yellow card) vs Gibraltar (4 September 2021); (yellow card) vs Netherlands (7 September 2021)	vs Norway (8 October 2021)
Turkey	Mert Müldür	(yellow card) vs Norway (27 March 2021); (yellow card) vs Gibraltar (13 November 2021)	vs Montenegro (16 November 2021)
Turkey	Çağlar Söyüncü	(yellow card) (yellow-red card) vs Netherlands (7 September 2021)	vs Norway (8 October 2021)
Turkey	Yusuf Yazıcı	(yellow card) vs Norway (8 October 2021); (yellow card) vs Latvia (11 October 2021)	vs Gibraltar (13 November 2021)
Turkey	Burak Yılmaz	(yellow card) vs Netherlands (24 March 2021); (yellow card) vs Montenegro (1 September 2021)	vs Gibraltar (4 September 2021)
