= Ozan Tufan =

Turkish footballer (born 1995)

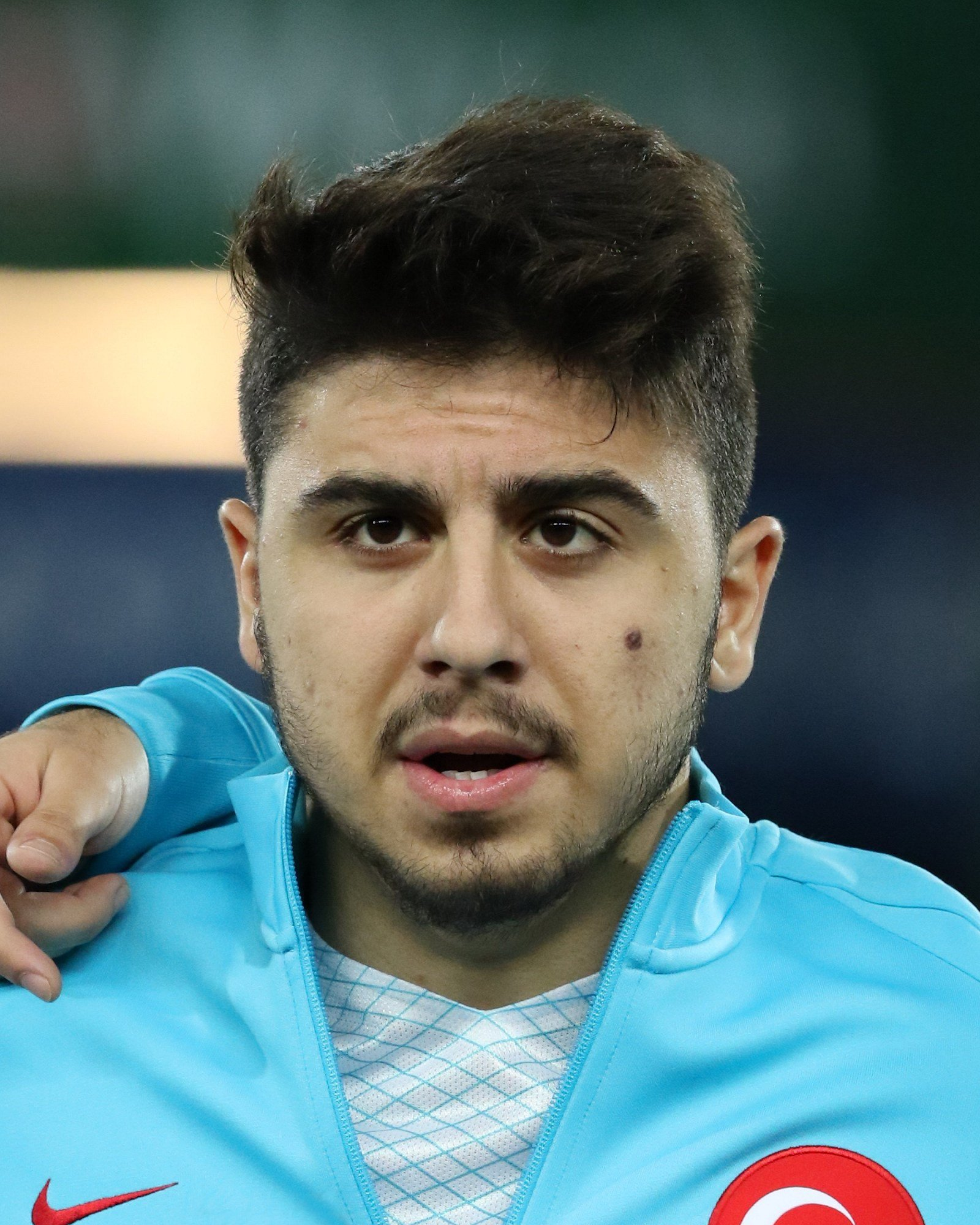
- Tufan with Turkey in 2016

Personal information
- Full name: Ozan Tufan
- Date of birth: 23 March 1995 (age 31)
- Place of birth: Orhaneli, Turkey
- Height: 1.79 m (5 ft 10 in)
- Positions: Attacking midfielder; striker; right winger

Team information
- Current team: Trabzonspor
- Number: 11

Youth career
- 2005–2012: Bursaspor

Senior career*
Years	Team	Apps	(Gls)
2012–2015	Bursaspor	41	(3)
2015–2022	Fenerbahçe	133	(18)
2019	→ Alanyaspor (loan)	17	(0)
2021–2022	→ Watford (loan)	7	(0)
2022–2024	Hull City	79	(18)
2024–	Trabzonspor	55	(5)

International career
2012	Turkey U17	1	(0)
2012–2013	Turkey U18	11	(0)
2012–2014	Turkey U19	16	(1)
2014–2021	Turkey	65	(9)
Medal record
Turkey U19
Runner-up	Mediterranean Games	2013
- * Club domestic league appearances and goals as of 14:56, 10 June 2026 (UTC)

Ozan Tufan (born 23 March 1995) is a Turkish professional footballer who plays as a midfielder for Süper Lig club Trabzonspor. His primary position is attacking midfielder, but he can also play as a striker or right winger.

== Club career ==
On 19 August 2021, Tufan left Turkey for the first time in his career when he joined newly-promoted English Premier League club Watford on a season-long loan deal with the option to buy. On 2 February 2022, the loan was terminated early with Tufan returning to Turkey having only made nine appearances in all competitions. Following his return, Watford's Academy Manager, Omer Riza, talked about Tufan's struggle to adapt to the pace of the Premier League.

On 1 July 2022, Tufan signed for Championship club Hull City for an undisclosed fee. Tufan signed a three-year deal with the club holding the option for a further year. He made his debut for the Tigers on 30 July in the home match against Bristol City and scored a penalty to level the score. Tufan scored his first hat-trick for Hull in their 4–2 home victory over Sheffield Wednesday on 12 August 2023. In September 2023, Tufan was named Hull City's Player of the Month for August.

On 27 June 2024, Tufan returned to Turkey and moved to Süper Lig club Trabzonspor for an undisclosed fee.

== International career ==
Tufan played for the Turkey national under-19 team, which won the silver medal at the 2013 Mediterranean Games in Mersin, Turkey. He also represented his country at the 2013 UEFA European Under-19 Championship.

On 25 May 2014, Tufan played his first national match for Turkey against Ireland in Dublin. On 3 September 2014, Tufan scored his first goal, a long range shot against Denmark in a friendly game at 90th minute. Turkey won the game 2–1. In a post-match interview about the game he replied " I had the ball in front of me and right when I was about to kick it, I heard Arda Turan backing me to shoot. I initially had the scare of hitting my shot off-range, on such an important moment; but I kept my composure and hit the ball right after. I want to thank Fatih Terim for giving me this chance, I think I've done the best I could today."

== Career statistics ==
=== Club ===
As of match played 15 August 2024

Appearances and goals by club, season and competition
Club	Season	League			National cup (Note: Includes Turkish Cup, FA Cup)		League cup (Note: Includes EFL Cup)		Europe		Other		Total	
Club	Season	Division	Apps	Goals	Apps	Goals	Apps	Goals	Apps	Goals	Apps	Goals	Apps	Goals
Bursaspor	2012–13	Süper Lig	1	0	4	0	–		1 (Note: Appearance(s) in UEFA Europa League)	1	–		6	1
Bursaspor	2013–14	Süper Lig	8	0	5	0	–		–		–		13	0
Bursaspor	2014–15	Süper Lig	32	3	12	0	–		2	0	–		46	3
Bursaspor	2015–16	Süper Lig	–		–		–		–		1 (Note: Appearance in Turkish Super Cup)	0	1	0
Bursaspor	Total		41	3	21	0	–		3	1	1	0	66	4
Fenerbahçe	2015–16	Süper Lig	26	0	10	0	–		9	1	–		45	1
Fenerbahçe	2016–17	Süper Lig	22	3	10	2	–		7 (Note: Two appearances in UEFA Champions League, five appearances in UEFA Europa League)	0	–		39	5
Fenerbahçe	2017–18	Süper Lig	9	3	1	0	–		4	0	–		14	3
Fenerbahçe	2018–19	Süper Lig	0	0	–		–		0	0	–		0	0
Fenerbahçe	2019–20	Süper Lig	33	6	1	0	–		–		–		34	6
Fenerbahçe	2020–21	Süper Lig	37	6	4	0	–		–		–		41	6
Fenerbahçe	2021–22	Süper Lig	6	0	1	0	–		2 (Note: Appearances in UEFA Europa Conference League)	0	–		9	0
Fenerbahçe	Total		133	18	27	2	–		22	1	–		182	21
Alanyaspor (loan)	2018–19	Süper Lig	17	0	2	0	–		–		–		19	0
Watford (loan)	2021–22	Premier League	7	0	1	0	1	0	–		–		9	0
Hull City	2022–23	Championship	42	8	1	0	1	0	–		–		44	8
Hull City	2023–24	Championship	37	10	2	0	1	0	–		–		40	10
Hull City	Total		79	18	3	0	2	0	–		–		84	18
Trabzonspor	2024–25	Süper Lig	1	0	0	0	–		4	0	–		5	0
Career total			278	39	54	2	3	0	29	2	1	0	365	43

=== International ===
Appearances and goals by national team and year
National team	Year	Apps	Goals
Turkey	2014	9	1
Turkey	2015	10	0
Turkey	2016	12	2
Turkey	2017	8	1
Turkey	2018	0	0
Turkey	2019	10	1
Turkey	2020	6	2
Turkey	2021	10	2
Total		65	9

Scores and results list Turkey's goal tally first, score column indicates score after each Tufan goal.

List of international goals scored by Ozan Tufan
No.	Date	Venue	Opponent	Score	Result	Competition
1	3 September 2014	TRE-FOR Park, Odense, Denmark	Denmark	2–1	2–1	Friendly
2	21 June 2016	Stade Bollaert-Delelis, Lens, France	Czech Republic	2–0	2–0	UEFA Euro 2016
3	6 October 2016	Torku Arena, Konya, Turkey	Ukraine	1–2	2–2	2018 FIFA World Cup qualification
4	11 June 2017	Loro Boriçi Stadium, Shkodër, Albania	Kosovo	4–1	4–1	2018 FIFA World Cup qualification
5	7 September 2019	Vodafone Park, Istanbul, Turkey	Andorra	1–0	1–0	UEFA Euro 2020 qualification
6	7 October 2020	RheinEnergieStadion, Cologne, Germany	Germany	1–1	3–3	Friendly
7	14 October 2020	Türk Telekom Arena, Istanbul, Turkey	Serbia	2–2	2–2	2020–21 UEFA Nations League B
8	27 March 2021	La Rosaleda Stadium, Málaga, Spain	Norway	1–0	3–0	2022 FIFA World Cup qualification
9	27 March 2021	La Rosaleda Stadium, Málaga, Spain	Norway	3–0	3–0	2022 FIFA World Cup qualification

== Honours ==
Trabzonspor

- Turkish Cup: 2025–26
