= 2020–21 UEFA Nations League B =

Tournament details
- Dates: 3 September – 18 November 2020
- Teams: 16
- Promoted: Austria; Czech Republic; Hungary; Wales
- Relegated: Northern Ireland; Slovakia; Turkey; Bulgaria

Tournament statistics
- Matches played: 47
- Goals scored: 104 (2.21 per match)
- Attendance: 28,883 (615 per match)
- Top scorer(s): (Norway) Erling Haaland (6 goals)

The 2020–21 UEFA Nations League B was the second division of the 2020–21 edition of the UEFA Nations League, the second season of the international football competition involving the men's national teams of the 55 member associations of UEFA.

== Format ==
Following a format change from the first season, League B was expanded from 12 to 16 teams. The league consisted of UEFA members ranked from 17 to 32 in the 2018–19 UEFA Nations League overall ranking, split into four groups of four. Each team played six matches within their group, using the home-and-away round-robin format on double matchdays in September, October and November 2020. The winners of each group were promoted to the 2022–23 UEFA Nations League A, and the fourth-placed team of each group was relegated to the 2022–23 UEFA Nations League C.

== Teams ==
=== Team changes ===
The following were the team changes of League B from the 2018–19 season:

Incoming
Promoted from Nations League C
Group winners: Finland; Norway; Scotland; Serbia	Following format change: Bulgaria; Hungary; Israel; Romania

Outgoing
Promoted to
Nations League A
- Bosnia and Herzegovina
- Denmark
- Sweden
- Ukraine

The following team changes were initially set to occur in League B, but did not after no teams were relegated due to the format change by UEFA:

Incoming
Initially relegated from
Nations League A
- Croatia
- Germany
- Iceland
- Poland

Outgoing
Initially relegated to
Nations League C
- Northern Ireland
- Republic of Ireland
- Slovakia
- Turkey

=== Seeding ===
In the 2020–21 access list, UEFA ranked teams based on the 2018–19 Nations League overall ranking, with a slight modification: teams that were originally relegated in the previous season were ranked immediately below teams promoted prior to the format change. The seeding pots for the league phase were confirmed 4 December 2019, and were based on the access list ranking.

Pot 1
Team	Rank
Russia	17
Austria	18
Wales	19
Czech Republic	20

Pot 2
Team	Rank
Scotland	21
Norway	22
Serbia	23
Finland	24

Pot 3
Team	Rank
Slovakia	25
Turkey	26
Republic of Ireland	27
Northern Ireland	28

Pot 4
Team	Rank
Bulgaria	29
Israel	30
Hungary	31
Romania	32

The draw for the league phase took place at the Beurs van Berlage Conference Centre in Amsterdam, Netherlands on 3 March 2020, 18:00 CET. Each group contained one team from each pot.

== Groups ==
The original fixture list was confirmed by UEFA on 3 March 2020 following the draw. On 17 June 2020, the UEFA Executive Committee adjusted the league phase schedule for October and November 2020 to allow for the completion of the UEFA Euro 2020 qualifying play-offs. Following the change, a revised schedule for the October and November 2020 fixtures was released by UEFA on 26 June 2020.

Times are CET/CEST, (Note: CEST (UTC+2) for matchdays 1–4 (September and October 2020), CET (UTC+1) for matchdays 5–6 (November 2020).) as listed by UEFA (local times, if different, are in parentheses).

=== Group 1 ===
Pos	Team	Pld	W	D	L	GF	GA	GD	Pts	Promotion or relegation	(Austria)	(Norway)	(Romania)	(Northern Ireland)
1	Austria (P)	6	4	1	1	9	6	+3	13	Promotion to League A	—	1–1	2–3	2–1
2	Norway	6	3	1	2	12	7	+5	10		1–2	—	4–0	1–0
3	Romania	6	2	2	2	8	9	−1	8		0–1	3–0 (Note: The Romania v Norway match was awarded as a 3–0 win to Romania after being cancelled as Norway could not travel to the match due to a positive SARS-CoV-2 test in the team.)	—	1–1
4	Northern Ireland (R)	6	0	2	4	4	11	−7	2	Relegation to League C	0–1	1–5	1–1	—

Source: UEFA
Rules for classification: Tiebreakers
(P) Promoted; (R) Relegated
Notes:
4 September 2020
20:45

Norway	1–2	Austria
Haaland 66'	Report	Gregoritsch 35'; Sabitzer 54' (pen.)

Ullevaal Stadion, Oslo
Attendance: 0 (Note: Due to the COVID-19 pandemic in Europe, all matches scheduled for September 2020 were played behind closed doors.)
Referee: Mattias Gestranius (Finland)
4 September 2020
20:45 (21:45 UTC+3)

Romania	1–1	Northern Ireland
Pușcaș 25'	Report	Whyte 86'

Arena Națională, Bucharest
Attendance: 0
Referee: François Letexier (France)

7 September 2020
20:45

Austria	2–3	Romania
Baumgartner 17'; Onisiwo 81'	Report	Alibec 3'; Grigore 51'; Maxim 70'

Wörthersee Stadion, Klagenfurt
Attendance: 0
Referee: Glenn Nyberg (Sweden)
7 September 2020
20:45 (19:45 UTC+1)

Northern Ireland	1–5	Norway
McNair 6'	Report	Elyounoussi 2'; Haaland 7', 58'; Sørloth 19', 47'

Windsor Park, Belfast
Attendance: 0
Referee: Bartosz Frankowski (Poland)

11 October 2020
18:00

Norway	4–0	Romania
Haaland 13', 64', 74'; Sørloth 39'	Report

Ullevaal Stadion, Oslo
Attendance: 200
Referee: Ivan Kružliak (Slovakia)
11 October 2020
20:45 (19:45 UTC+1)

Northern Ireland	0–1	Austria
	Report	Gregoritsch 42'

Windsor Park, Belfast
Attendance: 600
Referee: Petr Ardeleánu (Czech Republic)

14 October 2020
20:45

Norway	1–0	Northern Ireland
Dallas 68' (o.g.)	Report

Ullevaal Stadion, Oslo
Attendance: 200
Referee: Kristo Tohver (Estonia)
14 October 2020
20:45 (21:45 UTC+3)

Romania	0–1	Austria
	Report	Schöpf 76'

Ilie Oană Stadium, Ploiești
Attendance: 0 (Note: Due to the COVID-19 pandemic in Europe, the match was played behind closed doors.)
Referee: Daniel Stefański (Poland)

15 November 2020
20:45

Austria	2–1	Northern Ireland
Schaub 81'; Grbić 87'	Report	Magennis 75'

Ernst-Happel-Stadion, Vienna
Attendance: 0
Referee: Maurizio Mariani (Italy)
15 November 2020
20:45 (21:45 UTC+2)

Romania	3–0 Awarded (Note: The Romania v Norway match was cancelled and awarded as a 3–0 win to Romania after the Norway national team were prohibited from travelling to Romania by the Norwegian government due to a positive SARS-CoV-2 test in the squad.)	Norway
	Report

Arena Națională, Bucharest
Referee: Ali Palabıyık (Turkey)

18 November 2020
20:45

Austria	1–1	Norway
Grbić 90+4'	Report	Zahid 61'

Ernst-Happel-Stadion, Vienna
Attendance: 0
Referee: Benoît Bastien (France)
18 November 2020
20:45 (19:45 UTC±0)

Northern Ireland	1–1	Romania
Boyce 56'	Report	Bicfalvi 81'

Windsor Park, Belfast
Attendance: 1,060
Referee: Sandro Schärer (Switzerland)

=== Group 2 ===
Pos	Team	Pld	W	D	L	GF	GA	GD	Pts	Promotion or relegation	(Czech Republic)	(Scotland)	(Israel)	(Slovakia)
1	Czech Republic (P)	6	4	0	2	9	5	+4	12	Promotion to League A	—	1–2	1–0	2–0
2	Scotland	6	3	1	2	5	4	+1	10		1–0	—	1–1	1–0
3	Israel	6	2	2	2	7	7	0	8		1–2	1–0	—	1–1
4	Slovakia (R)	6	1	1	4	5	10	−5	4	Relegation to League C	1–3	1–0	2–3	—

Source: UEFA
Rules for classification: Tiebreakers
(P) Promoted; (R) Relegated
4 September 2020
20:45 (19:45 UTC+1)

Scotland	1–1	Israel
Christie 45' (pen.)	Report	Zahavi 73'

Hampden Park, Glasgow
Attendance: 295
Referee: Slavko Vinčić (Slovenia)
4 September 2020
20:45

Slovakia	1–3	Czech Republic
Schranz 88'	Report	Coufal 48'; Dočkal 53' (pen.); Krmenčík 86'

Tehelné pole, Bratislava
Attendance: 0
Referee: Andris Treimanis (Latvia)

7 September 2020
20:45

Czech Republic	1–2	Scotland
Pešek 12'	Report	Dykes 27'; Christie 52' (pen.)

Andrův stadion, Olomouc
Attendance: 0
Referee: Serdar Gözübüyük (Netherlands)
7 September 2020
20:45 (21:45 UTC+3)

Israel	1–1	Slovakia
Elmkies 90+1'	Report	Ďuriš 14'

Netanya Stadium, Netanya
Attendance: 0
Referee: Nikola Dabanović (Montenegro)

11 October 2020
20:45 (21:45 UTC+3)

Israel	1–2	Czech Republic
Zahavi 56'	Report	Abu Hanna 14' (o.g.); Vydra 48'

Sammy Ofer Stadium, Haifa
Attendance: 0
Referee: Tiago Martins (Portugal)
11 October 2020
20:45 (19:45 UTC+1)

Scotland	1–0	Slovakia
Dykes 54'	Report

Hampden Park, Glasgow
Attendance: 93
Referee: Davide Massa (Italy)

14 October 2020
20:45 (19:45 UTC+1)

Scotland	1–0	Czech Republic
Fraser 6'	Report

Hampden Park, Glasgow
Attendance: 299
Referee: Felix Zwayer (Germany)
14 October 2020
20:45

Slovakia	2–3	Israel
Hamšík 16'; Mak 38'	Report	Zahavi 68', 76', 89'

Anton Malatinský Stadium, Trnava
Attendance: 0
Referee: Alejandro Hernández Hernández (Spain)

15 November 2020
15:00

Slovakia	1–0	Scotland
Greguš 32'	Report

Anton Malatinský Stadium, Trnava
Attendance: 0
Referee: István Kovács (Romania)
15 November 2020
20:45

Czech Republic	1–0	Israel
Darida 7'	Report

Doosan Arena, Plzeň
Attendance: 0
Referee: Srđan Jovanović (Serbia)

18 November 2020
20:45

Czech Republic	2–0	Slovakia
Souček 17'; Ondrášek 55'	Report

Doosan Arena, Plzeň
Attendance: 0
Referee: Cüneyt Çakır (Turkey)
18 November 2020
20:45 (21:45 UTC+2)

Israel	1–0	Scotland
Solomon 44'	Report

Netanya Stadium, Netanya
Attendance: 0
Referee: Paweł Raczkowski (Poland)

=== Group 3 ===
Pos	Team	Pld	W	D	L	GF	GA	GD	Pts	Promotion or relegation	(Hungary)	(Russia)	(Serbia)	(Turkey)
1	Hungary (P)	6	3	2	1	7	4	+3	11	Promotion to League A	—	2–3	1–1	2–0
2	Russia	6	2	2	2	9	12	−3	8		0–0	—	3–1	1–1
3	Serbia	6	1	3	2	9	7	+2	6 (Note: Tied on head-to-head points (2) and head-to-head goal difference (0). Head-to-head away goals: Serbia 2, Turkey 0.)		0–1	5–0	—	0–0
4	Turkey (R)	6	1	3	2	6	8	−2	6	Relegation to League C	0–1	3–2	2–2	—

Source: UEFA
Rules for classification: Tiebreakers
(P) Promoted; (R) Relegated
Notes:
3 September 2020
20:45 (21:45 UTC+3)

Russia	3–1	Serbia
Dzyuba 48' (pen.), 81'; Karavayev 69'	Report	A. Mitrović 78'

VTB Arena, Moscow
Attendance: 0
Referee: William Collum (Scotland)
3 September 2020
20:45 (21:45 UTC+3)

Turkey	0–1	Hungary
	Report	Szoboszlai 80'

New Sivas 4 Eylül Stadium, Sivas
Attendance: 0
Referee: Artur Soares Dias (Portugal)

6 September 2020
18:00

Hungary	2–3	Russia
Sallai 62'; Nikolić 70'	Report	Miranchuk 15'; Ozdoyev 34'; Fernandes 46'

Puskás Aréna, Budapest
Attendance: 0
Referee: Maurizio Mariani (Italy)
6 September 2020
20:45

Serbia	0–0	Turkey
	Report

Red Star Stadium, Belgrade
Attendance: 0
Referee: Aleksei Kulbakov (Belarus)

11 October 2020
20:45 (21:45 UTC+3)

Russia	1–1	Turkey
Miranchuk 28'	Report	Karaman 62'

VTB Arena, Moscow
Attendance: 5,019
Referee: Matej Jug (Slovenia)
11 October 2020
20:45

Serbia	0–1	Hungary
	Report	Könyves 20'

Red Star Stadium, Belgrade
Attendance: 0
Referee: Sandro Schärer (Switzerland)

14 October 2020
20:45 (21:45 UTC+3)

Russia	0–0	Hungary
	Report

VTB Arena, Moscow
Attendance: 4,821
Referee: Michael Oliver (England)
14 October 2020
20:45 (21:45 UTC+3)

Turkey	2–2	Serbia
Çalhanoğlu 57'; Tufan 76'	Report	Milinković-Savić 22'; A. Mitrović 49' (pen.)

Türk Telekom Stadium, Istanbul
Attendance: 519
Referee: Georgi Kabakov (Bulgaria)

15 November 2020
18:00 (20:00 UTC+3)

Turkey	3–2	Russia
Karaman 26'; Ünder 32'; Tosun 52' (pen.)	Report	Cheryshev 11'; Kuzyayev 57'

Şükrü Saracoğlu Stadium, Istanbul
Attendance: 812
Referee: Szymon Marciniak (Poland)
15 November 2020
20:45

Hungary	1–1	Serbia
Kalmár 39'	Report	Radonjić 17'

Puskás Aréna, Budapest
Attendance: 0
Referee: Glenn Nyberg (Sweden)

18 November 2020
20:45

Hungary	2–0	Turkey
Sigér 57'; Varga 90+5'	Report

Puskás Aréna, Budapest
Attendance: 0
Referee: Ivan Kružliak (Slovakia)
18 November 2020
20:45

Serbia	5–0	Russia
Radonjić 10'; Jović 25', 45+1'; Vlahović 41'; Mladenović 64'	Report

Red Star Stadium, Belgrade
Attendance: 0
Referee: Anthony Taylor (England)

=== Group 4 ===
Pos	Team	Pld	W	D	L	GF	GA	GD	Pts	Promotion or relegation	(Wales)	(Finland)	(Republic of Ireland)	(Bulgaria)
1	Wales (P)	6	5	1	0	7	1	+6	16	Promotion to League A	—	3–1	1–0	1–0
2	Finland	6	4	0	2	7	5	+2	12		0–1	—	1–0	2–0
3	Republic of Ireland	6	0	3	3	1	4	−3	3		0–0	0–1	—	0–0
4	Bulgaria (R)	6	0	2	4	2	7	−5	2	Relegation to League C	0–1	1–2	1–1	—

Source: UEFA
Rules for classification: Tiebreakers
(P) Promoted; (R) Relegated
3 September 2020
20:45 (21:45 UTC+3)

Bulgaria	1–1	Republic of Ireland
Kraev 56'	Report	Duffy 90+3'

Vasil Levski National Stadium, Sofia
Attendance: 0
Referee: Manuel Schüttengruber (Austria)
3 September 2020
20:45 (21:45 UTC+3)

Finland	0–1	Wales
	Report	Moore 80'

Olympic Stadium, Helsinki
Attendance: 0
Referee: Daniel Siebert (Germany)

6 September 2020
15:00 (14:00 UTC+1)

Wales	1–0	Bulgaria
N. Williams 90+4'	Report

Cardiff City Stadium, Cardiff
Attendance: 0
Referee: Fábio Veríssimo (Portugal)
6 September 2020
18:00 (17:00 UTC+1)

Republic of Ireland	0–1	Finland
	Report	Jensen 64'

Aviva Stadium, Dublin
Attendance: 0
Referee: Fabio Maresca (Italy)

11 October 2020
15:00 (14:00 UTC+1)

Republic of Ireland	0–0	Wales
	Report

Aviva Stadium, Dublin
Attendance: 0
Referee: Anastasios Sidiropoulos (Greece)
11 October 2020
18:00 (19:00 UTC+3)

Finland	2–0	Bulgaria
Taylor 52'; Jensen 67'	Report

Olympic Stadium, Helsinki
Attendance: 6,587
Referee: Erik Lambrechts (Belgium)

14 October 2020
18:00 (19:00 UTC+3)

Finland	1–0	Republic of Ireland
Jensen 66'	Report

Olympic Stadium, Helsinki
Attendance: 7,900
Referee: Lionel Tschudi (Switzerland)
14 October 2020
20:45 (21:45 UTC+3)

Bulgaria	0–1	Wales
	Report	J. Williams 85'

Vasil Levski National Stadium, Sofia
Attendance: 478
Referee: Aliyar Aghayev (Azerbaijan)

15 November 2020
18:00 (19:00 UTC+2)

Bulgaria	1–2	Finland
Iliev 68' (pen.)	Report	Pukki 7'; Lod 45+1'

Vasil Levski National Stadium, Sofia
Attendance: 0
Referee: Donatas Rumšas (Lithuania)
15 November 2020
18:00 (17:00 UTC±0)

Wales	1–0	Republic of Ireland
Brooks 67'	Report

Cardiff City Stadium, Cardiff
Attendance: 0
Referee: Petr Ardeleánu (Czech Republic)

18 November 2020
20:45 (19:45 UTC±0)

Republic of Ireland	0–0	Bulgaria
	Report

Aviva Stadium, Dublin
Attendance: 0
Referee: Lawrence Visser (Belgium)
18 November 2020
20:45 (19:45 UTC±0)

Wales	3–1	Finland
Wilson 29'; James 46'; Moore 84'	Report	Pukki 63'

Cardiff City Stadium, Cardiff
Attendance: 0
Referee: Jesús Gil Manzano (Spain)

== Goalscorers ==
There were 104 goals scored in 47 matches, for an average of 2.21 goals per match.

6 goals

- (Norway) Erling Haaland

5 goals

- (Israel) Eran Zahavi

3 goals

- (Finland) Fredrik Jensen
- (Norway) Alexander Sørloth

2 goals

- (Austria) Adrian Grbić
- (Austria) Michael Gregoritsch
- (Finland) Teemu Pukki
- (Russia) Artem Dzyuba
- (Russia) Anton Miranchuk
- (Scotland) Ryan Christie
- (Scotland) Lyndon Dykes
- (Serbia) Luka Jović
- (Serbia) Aleksandar Mitrović
- (Serbia) Nemanja Radonjić
- (Turkey) Kenan Karaman
- (Wales) Kieffer Moore

1 goal

- (Austria) Christoph Baumgartner
- (Austria) Karim Onisiwo
- (Austria) Marcel Sabitzer
- (Austria) Louis Schaub
- (Austria) Alessandro Schöpf
- (Bulgaria) Dimitar Iliev
- (Bulgaria) Bozhidar Kraev
- (Czech Republic) Vladimír Coufal
- (Czech Republic) Vladimír Darida
- (Czech Republic) Bořek Dočkal
- (Czech Republic) Michael Krmenčík
- (Czech Republic) Zdeněk Ondrášek
- (Czech Republic) Jakub Pešek
- (Czech Republic) Tomáš Souček
- (Czech Republic) Matěj Vydra
- (Finland) Robin Lod
- (Finland) Robert Taylor
- (Hungary) Zsolt Kalmár
- (Hungary) Norbert Könyves
- (Hungary) Nemanja Nikolić
- (Hungary) Roland Sallai
- (Hungary) Dávid Sigér
- (Hungary) Dominik Szoboszlai
- (Hungary) Kevin Varga
- (Israel) Ilay Elmkies
- (Israel) Manor Solomon
- (Northern Ireland) Liam Boyce
- (Northern Ireland) Josh Magennis
- (Northern Ireland) Paddy McNair
- (Northern Ireland) Gavin Whyte
- (Norway) Mohamed Elyounoussi
- (Norway) Ghayas Zahid
- (Republic of Ireland) Shane Duffy
- (Romania) Denis Alibec
- (Romania) Eric Bicfalvi
- (Romania) Dragoș Grigore
- (Romania) Alexandru Maxim
- (Romania) George Pușcaș
- (Russia) Denis Cheryshev
- (Russia) Mário Fernandes
- (Russia) Vyacheslav Karavayev
- (Russia) Daler Kuzyayev
- (Russia) Magomed Ozdoyev
- (Scotland) Ryan Fraser
- (Serbia) Sergej Milinković-Savić
- (Serbia) Filip Mladenović
- (Serbia) Dušan Vlahović
- (Slovakia) Michal Ďuriš
- (Slovakia) Ján Greguš
- (Slovakia) Marek Hamšík
- (Slovakia) Róbert Mak
- (Slovakia) Ivan Schranz
- (Turkey) Hakan Çalhanoğlu
- (Turkey) Cenk Tosun
- (Turkey) Ozan Tufan
- (Turkey) Cengiz Ünder
- (Wales) David Brooks
- (Wales) Daniel James
- (Wales) Jonny Williams
- (Wales) Neco Williams
- (Wales) Harry Wilson

1 own goal

- (Israel) Joel Abu Hanna (against Czech Republic)
- (Northern Ireland) Stuart Dallas (against Norway)

== Overall ranking ==
The 16 League B teams were ranked 17th to 32nd overall in the 2020–21 UEFA Nations League according to the following rules:

- The teams finishing first in the groups were ranked 17th to 20th according to the results of the league phase.
- The teams finishing second in the groups were ranked 21st to 24th according to the results of the league phase.
- The teams finishing third in the groups were ranked 25th to 28th according to the results of the league phase.
- The teams finishing fourth in the groups were ranked 29th to 32nd according to the results of the league phase.

Rnk	Grp	Team	Pld	W	D	L	GF	GA	GD	Pts
17	B4	Wales	6	5	1	0	7	1	+6	16
18	B1	Austria	6	4	1	1	9	6	+3	13
19	B2	Czech Republic	6	4	0	2	9	5	+4	12
20	B3	Hungary	6	3	2	1	7	4	+3	11
21	B4	Finland	6	4	0	2	7	5	+2	12
22	B1	Norway	6	3	1	2	12	7	+5	10
23	B2	Scotland	6	3	1	2	5	4	+1	10
24	B3	Russia	6	2	2	2	9	12	−3	8
25	B2	Israel	6	2	2	2	7	7	0	8
26	B1	Romania	6	2	2	2	8	9	−1	8
27	B3	Serbia	6	1	3	2	9	7	+2	6
28	B4	Republic of Ireland	6	0	3	3	1	4	−3	3
29	B3	Turkey	6	1	3	2	6	8	−2	6
30	B2	Slovakia	6	1	1	4	5	10	−5	4
31	B4	Bulgaria	6	0	2	4	2	7	−5	2
32	B1	Northern Ireland	6	0	2	4	4	11	−7	2

Source: UEFA
Rules for classification: Ranking criteria
