= List of foreign Eliteserien players =

This is a list of foreign players in the top flight of Norwegian football, currently known as Eliteserien, which commenced play in 1937. The following players must meet both of the following two criteria:

1. Have played at least one Eliteserien game. Players who were signed by Eliteserien clubs, but only played in lower league, cup and/or European games, or did not play in any competitive games at all, are not included.
2. Are considered foreign, determined by the following:

A player is considered foreign if he is not eligible to play for Norway national football team, more specifically:
- If a player has been capped on international level, the national team is used; if he has been capped by more than one country, the highest level (or the most recent) team is used.
- If a player has not been capped on international level, his country of birth is used, except those who were born abroad from Norwegian parents or moved to Norway at a young age, and those who clearly indicated to have switched his nationality to another nation.

Clubs listed are those for which the player has played at least one Eliteserien game — and seasons are those in which the player has played at least one Eliteserien game.

In bold: players who have played at least one Eliteserien game in the most recent season (2025), and are still at a club for which they have played. This does not include current players of an Eliteserien club who have not played an Eliteserien game in the current season.

Details correct as of 22 December 2025

== Albania ==
- Eneo Bitri – Vålerenga – 2023
- Jahmir Hyka – Rosenborg – 2006
- Agon Mehmeti – Stabæk – 2016–17
- Migen Memelli – Brann – 2006
- Agon Muçolli – Kristiansund – 2021–22
- Adrion Pajaziti – Haugesund – 2023
- Sebino Plaku – HamKam – 2008

== Algeria ==
- Habib Bellaïd – Sarpsborg 08 – 2015
- Redouane Drici – Brann – 1984, 1987–91

== Andorra ==
- Marc Vales – Sandefjord – 2018, 2020–21

== Angola ==
- Vá – Lillestrøm – 2024

== Argentina ==
- Matías Almeyda – Lyn – 2007
- Pablo Fontanello – Stabæk – 2014
- Renzo Giampaoli – Rosenborg – 2022
- Enrique Ortiz – Lyn – 2005–07
- Lucas Pratto – Lyn – 2008–09
- Diego de la Vega – Bryne – 2002

== Armenia ==
- Levon Pachajyan – Fredrikstad – 2009

== Australia ==
- **Nicholas D'Agostino** – **Viking** – 2023–
- Ahmad Elrich – Lyn – 2006
- Alex Gersbach – Rosenborg – 2016–19
- Chad Gibson – Bodø/Glimt – 2001
- Keegan Jelacic – Stabæk – 2023
- Ante Juric – Molde – 1999
- Stephen Laybutt – Lyn – 2001
- Dylan Macallister – Brann, Lyn – 2004–06
- Anthony Magnacca – Brann – 2001
- Jade North – Tromsø – 2010
- Michael Petkovic – Lillestrøm – 2001
- Saša Radulović – Lillestrøm – 2005
- Shane Stefanutto – Lillestrøm, Lyn – 2004–09
- **Gianni Stensness** – **Viking** – 2021–
- Michael Thwaite – Brann – 2008
- Kasey Wehrman – Moss, Lillestrøm, Fredrikstad, Lyn – 2001–02, 2003–09
- Patrick Yazbek – Viking – 2023–24
- Clayton Zane – Molde, Lillestrøm – 2000–02

== Austria ==
- Markus Berger – Start – 2014
- Roman Kienast – Ham-Kam – 2006, 2008
- Markus Kiesenebner – Lillestrøm – 2007
- Martin Kreuzriegler – Sandefjord, Vålerenga – 2020–21, 2023
- Michael Langer – Vålerenga – 2014–15
- Mario Pavelić – Sarpsborg 08 – 2019
- Thomas Piermayr – Lillestrøm – 2013
- Martin Pušić – Vålerenga, Fredrikstad, Brann – 2012–14
- Samuel Şahin-Radlinger – Brann – 2018
- Paul Scharner – Brann – 2004–06
- Benjamin Sulimani – Viking – 2013
- Dominique Taboga – Tromsø – 2009–10
- Philipp Zulechner – Odd – 2022

== Belgium ==
- David Brocken – Vålerenga – 2004–05
- **Denzel De Roeve** – **Brann** – 2025–
- Steve Cooreman – Ham-Kam – 2006, 2008
- Álex Craninx – Molde, Lillestrøm – 2019–22, 2021
- Jimmy De Wulf – Tromsø – 2001
- Yassine El Ghanassy – Stabæk – 2015
- Tortol Lumanza – Stabæk – 2017–18, 2019–21
- Akwasi Oduro – Bodø/Glimt – 2009
- Marvin Ogunjimi – Strømsgodset – 2014–16
- **Evangelos Patoulidis** – **Sandefjord** – 2025–
- Koen Schockaert – Tromsø – 2001
- Axel Smeets – Ham-Kam – 2004–06
- Karel Snoeckx – Vålerenga – 2003

== Benin ==
- Jordan Adéoti – Sarpsborg 08 – 2020
- Sidoine Oussou – Vålerenga – 2011

== Bosnia and Herzegovina ==
- Adnan Čaušević – Tromsø – 2013–14
- Eldar Hadžimehmedović – Lyn, Strømsgodset – 2001–04
- Haris Hajradinović – Haugesund – 2016–17
- Omar Marković – Start – 2013
- Adnan Mravac – Lillestrøm – 2001
- Darko Nestorović – Ham-Kam – 1995
- Amer Ordagić – Brann, Sandefjord – 2018–20, 2021–22
- Amer Osmanagić – Haugesund – 2012
- Sead Ramović – Tromsø, Lillestrøm, Strømsgodset – 2006–10, 2012, 2014
- Admir Raščić – Sandefjord – 2009–10
- Fenan Salčinović – Sandefjord – 2009
- Samir Šarić – Sandefjord – 2009–10
- Besim Šerbečić – Rosenborg, Aalesund – 2018, 2021, 2022
- Haris Skenderović – Stabæk – 2011

== Brazil ==
- Adriano – Sandefjord, Tromsø – 2006–09
- Agnaldo – Molde – 2013–16
- Alanzinho – Stabæk – 2006–08, 2016–17
- Dedé Anderson – Aalesund – 2006–09
- Daniel Bamberg – Haugesund – 2011, 2013–15
- Samuel Camazzola – Sandefjord – 2008–10
- Leonardo Ferreira da Silva – Ham-Kam – 2008
- Vini Dantas – Molde – 2011–12
- Diego – Brann – 2010
- Diogo – Stabæk – 2010
- Edmílson – Lyn – 2004
- Éverton – Fredrikstad – 2008–09
- Gilmak – Fredrikstad – 2010
- Juninho – Brann – 2010–11
- Kayke – Tromsø – 2010
- Leonardo – Ham-Kam – 2008
- Jonatan Lucca – Stabæk – 2023
- Marcelo – Odd Grenland – 2009
- Marciano – Sandefjord – 2009–10
- Marlinho – Aalesund – 2015–17
- Thiago Martins – Bodø/Glimt – 2007–10
- Wélton Araújo Melo – Fredrikstad – 2003
- José Mota – Molde – 2008, 2008–11
- Neydson – Molde – 2015
- **Vinícius Nogueira** – **Vålerenga** – 2025–
- Bechara Oliveira – Aalesund – 2005
- Pernambuco – Bodø/Glimt – 2021
- Bruno Rato – Start – 2007
- Ricardo Friedrich – Bodø/Glimt – 2018–19
- Ricardo Santos – Sogndal – 2012
- Diego Silva – Aalesund – 2007–10
- Bruno Gabriel Soares – Haugesund – 2017
- Tigrão – Odd Grenland – 2006
- Tomaz Júnior – Molde – 2008–09
- Vitor Hugo – Vålerenga – 2023
- Fernando Wallace – Fredrikstad – 2008–09
- Ygor – Start – 2007
- Zé Eduardo – Sandefjord – 2020–21

== Bulgaria ==
- Ivaylo Kirov – Lillestrøm – 1990

== Burkina Faso ==
- Yssouf Koné – Rosenborg, Vålerenga – 2006–08, 2011
- Bakary Saré – Rosenborg – 2010
- Ismaël Seone – Haugesund – 2024–2025
- Abdou Razack Traoré – Rosenborg – 2007–10

== Burundi ==
- Parfait Bizoza – Aalesund, Haugesund – 2020, 2024–2025
- Janvier Ndikumana – Sandnes Ulf – 2011
- Selemani Ndikumana – Molde – 2008
- Claus Niyukuri – Haugesund – 2023–2025

== Cameroon ==
- Thomas Amang – Molde, Kristiansund – 2016–19
- **Brice Ambina** – **Vålerenga** – 2025–
- Gustave Bahoken – Aalesund – 2005–08
- Faris Pemi Moumbagna – Kristiansund, Bodø/Glimt – 2020–22, 2023
- Arnaud Monkam – Brann– 2006
- Alain Junior Ollé Ollé – Stabæk – 2011–12
- Patrick Suffo – Odd Grenland – 2005
- Duplexe Tchamba – Strømsgodset – 2019–21
- Somen Tchoyi – Odd Grenland, Stabæk – 2005–08
- Guy Toindouba – Lillestrøm – 2012

== Canada ==
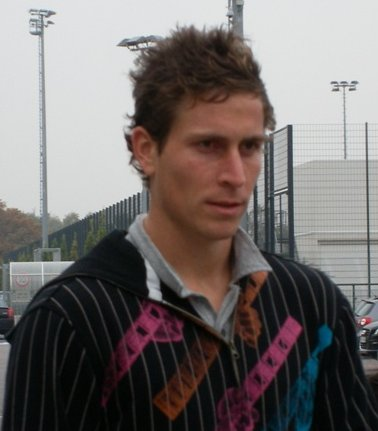
Rob Friend has played 40 top division matches for Molde.

- Sam Adekugbe – Vålerenga – 2018–21
- Stephen Ademolu – Tromsø – 2005–07
- Clément Bayiha – Ham-Kam – 2022
- Patrice Bernier – Tromsø – 2004–07
- Julian Dunn – Ham-Kam – 2022–24
- Rob Friend – Molde – 2004–06
- Ali Gerba – Odd Grenland – 2006
- Sandro Grande – Viking, Molde – 2005, 2006–07
- Kevin Harmse – Tromsø – 2003
- Lars Hirschfeld – Tromsø, Rosenborg, Vålerenga – 2005–07, 2010–11
- **Patrick Metcalfe** – **Fredrikstad** – 2024–
- Zakaria Messoudi – Odd – 2016–18
- Jayden Nelson – Rosenborg – 2023–25
- Tam Nsaliwa – Lillestrøm – 2010
- Olivier Occéan – Odd Grenland, Lillestrøm, Mjøndalen – 2004–06, 2006–10, 2015–18, 2019
- Chris Pozniak – Haugesund – 2010–12
- Marco Reda – Sogndal – 2002–04
- Tosaint Ricketts – Vålerenga, Sandnes Ulf – 2012–13
- Kevin De Serpa – Haugesund – 2005
- Kenny Stamatopoulos – Tromsø, Lyn, Fredrikstad – 2006–09
- **Simon Thomas** – Bodø/Glimt, Sarpsborg 08, **Tromsø** – 2016, 2020, 2022–
- Kosi Thompson – Lillestrøm – 2023

== Cape Verde ==
- Willis Furtado – Jerv – 2022
- Bruno Leite – Haugesund – 2017–21, 2022–2025
- Erikson Spinola Lima – Sarpsborg 08, Aalesund – 2017, 2020, 2022
- Paulo Dos Santos – Aalesund – 2003, 2005

== Central African Republic ==
- Dylan Mboumbouni – Jerv – 2022

== Chile ==
- **Niklas Castro** – Vålerenga, Aalesund, **Brann** – 2016, 2020, 2023–
- Diego Rubio – Sandnes Ulf – 2014

== China ==
- Tao Hongliang – Stabæk – 2017

== Comoros ==
- Ali Ahamada – Brann – 2020

== Costa Rica ==
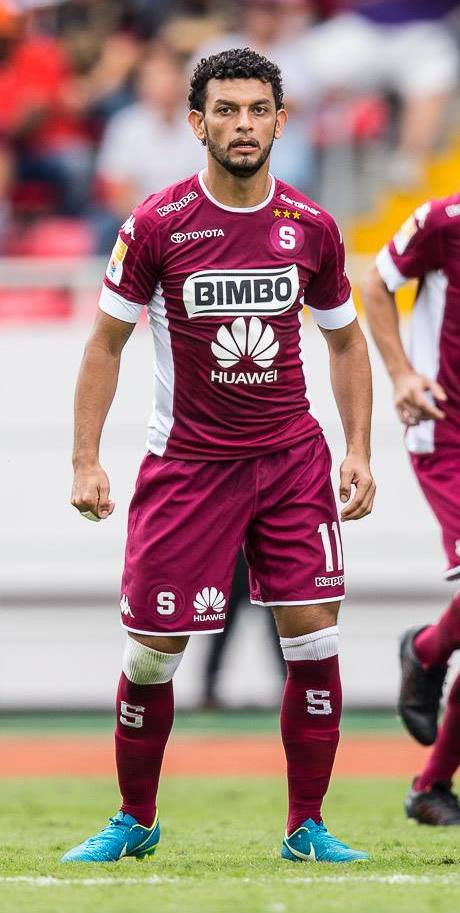
Michael Barrantes has played 122 top division matches for Aalesund.

- Bismar Acosta – Start, Brann – 2013–14, 2016–20
- Wílmer Azofeifa – Sarpsborg 08 – 2019
- Michael Barrantes – Aalesund – 2010–15
- Christian Bolaños – Start – 2009–10
- Celso Borges – Fredrikstad – 2009–11
- Randall Brenes – Bodø/Glimt, Sandnes Ulf – 2005, 2008, 2014
- Diego Calvo – Vålerenga – 2013
- Jorge Castro – Start, Sarpsborg 08 – 2013–15
- Mynor Escoe – Stabæk – 2016–17
- Fernán Faerrón – HamKam – 2022
- Cristian Gamboa – Fredrikstad, Rosenborg – 2011, 2012–14
- Mayron George – Vålerenga – 2019
- Giancarlo González – Vålerenga – 2012–13
- Pablo Herrera – Aalesund – 2009–11
- Juan Diego Madrigal – Fredrikstad – 2013
- Yherland McDonald – Fredrikstad – 2004–06
- Roy Miller – Bodø/Glimt, Rosenborg – 2005, 2008–09
- Carlos Castro Mora – Haugesund – 2007
- Heiner Mora – Hønefoss – 2012–13
- David Myrie – Fredrikstad – 2011
- Fernando Paniagua – Start – 2014–15
- Rodolfo Rodríguez – Haugesund – 2007–08
- Douglas Sequeira – Tromsø – 2007–09
- Alonso Solís – Brann – 2002
- Daniel Torres – Tromsø, Bryne – 2005, 2008
- Deyver Vega – Brann, Vålerenga, Sandefjord – 2016–18, 2019–20, 2020, 2021–22

== Cote d'Ivoire ==
- Davy Angan – Lyn, Hønefoss, Molde – 2008–09, 2010, 2011–12
- Daouda Bamba – Kristiansund, Brann – 2017–18, 2018–21
- Kevin Beugré – Hønefoss – 2010, 2012–13
- Franck Boli – Stabæk, Aalesund – 2012–15, 2016–19
- Mathis Bolly – Lillestrøm, Stabæk, Molde – 2008–12, 2021, 2019–22, 2023–25
- Ismael Petcho Camara – Haugesund – 2025
- Vamouti Diomande – Sandefjord, Mjøndalen – 2010, 2015, 2019
- Franck Dja Djédjé – Sarpsborg 08 – 2014
- Constant Djakpa – Sogndal – 2006–07
- Victorien Djedje – Haugesund – 2008–10
- Alhassane Dosso – Lillestrøm – 2009–11
- Ahyee Aye Elvis – Sogndal – 2004, 2011–12
- Datro Fofana – Molde – 2021–22
- Ismaël Fofana – Fredrikstad – 2007
- Moryké Fofana – Lillestrøm – 2012–15
- Boti Goa – Rosenborg – 2011
- Ghislain Guessan – Viking – 2017
- Barry Kader – Sogndal – 2011
- Benjamin Karamoko – Haugesund, Aalesund, Sarpsborg 08 – 2018, 2020, 2021
- Luc Kassi – Stabæk – 2012, 2014–17, 2019–20
- Aboubakar Keita – Stabæk – 2018
- Didier Ya Konan – Rosenborg – 2007–09
- Konan Kouadio – Fredrikstad – 2007
- Raoul Kouakou – Sogndal, Sandefjord – 2002–04, 2007
- Sayouba Mandé – Stabæk – 2012, 2014–18
- **Caleb Zady Sery** – **Molde** – 2025–
- **Amidou Traoré** – **Molde** – 2025–
- Jean Stéphane Yao Yao – Lyn – 2009

== Croatia ==
- Dario Čanađija – Sarpsborg 08, Aalesund – 2021, 2022
- Marko Ćosić – Haugesund – 2017–18
- Šime Gregov – Viking – 2017–18
- Ante Knezovic – Kristiansund BK – 2017–18
- Mirko Kramarić – Haugesund – 2014–15
- Filip Lončarić – Tromsø – 2016–18
- Mate Maleš – Sarpsborg 08 – 2019–20
- Marin Oršulić – Tromsø – 2015
- Nikola Tkalčić – Sarpsborg 08 – 2018–19
- Ante Vitaić – Ham-Kam – 2008
- Dario Zahora – Rosenborg – 2009

== Curaçao ==
- Jeremy Cijntje – Jerv – 2022

== Czech Republic ==
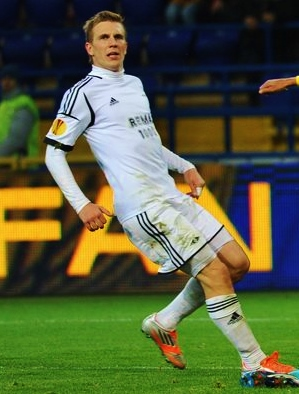
Bořek Dočkal has played 55 top division matches for Rosenborg.

- Bořek Dočkal – Rosenborg – 2011–13
- Martin Fillo – Viking – 2008–10
- Josef Kaufman – Viking – 2008
- Lucas Kubr – Bodø/Glimt – 2022–24
- Jan Lecjaks – Vålerenga – 2013
- Zdeněk Ondrášek – Tromsø – 2012, 2012–15, 2021
- Zbyněk Pospěch – Odd Grenland – 2007
- Zdeněk Šenkeřík – Stabæk – 2009
- Michal Škoda – Lillestrøm – 2017

== Denmark ==
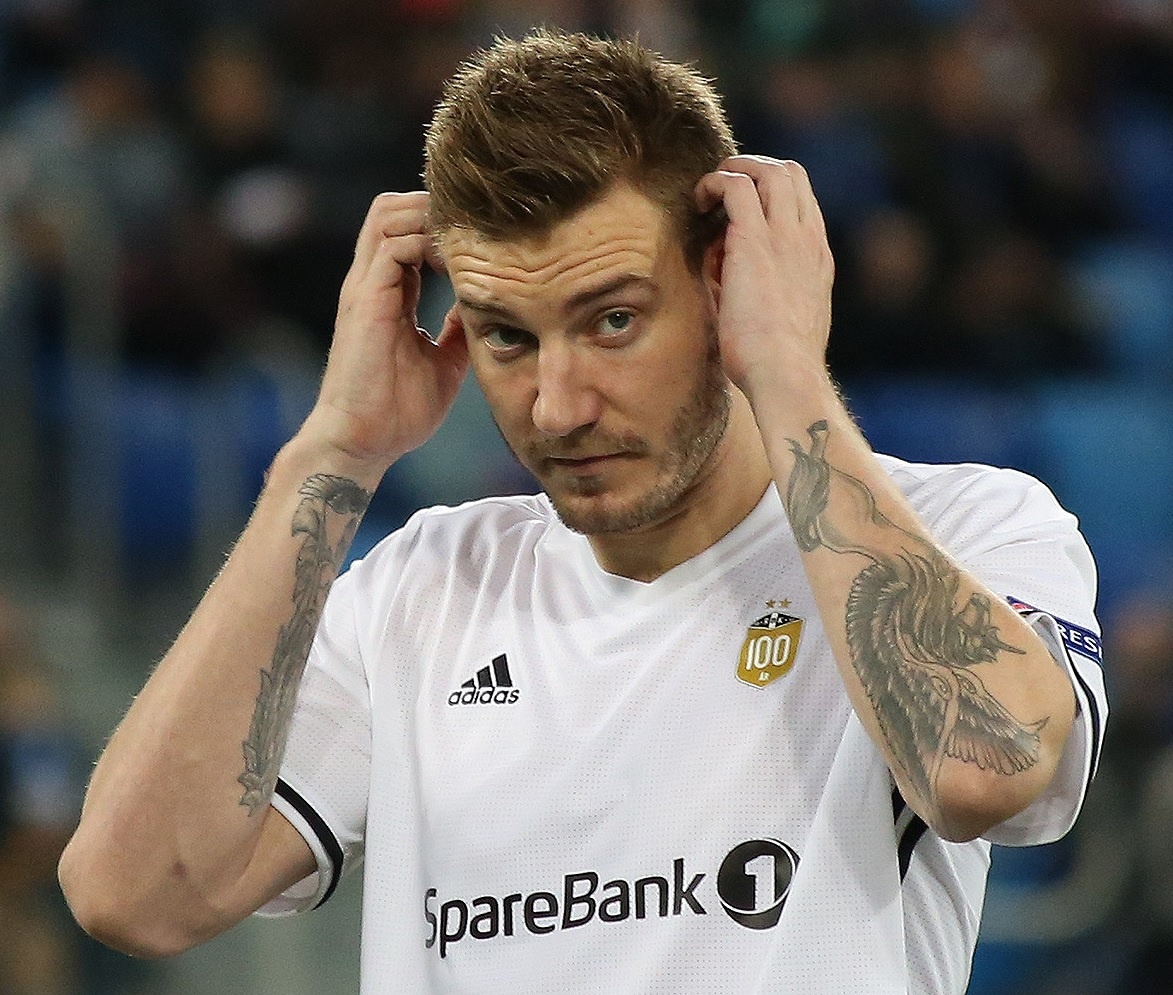
Nicklas Bendtner has played 57 Eliteserien matches for Rosenborg.

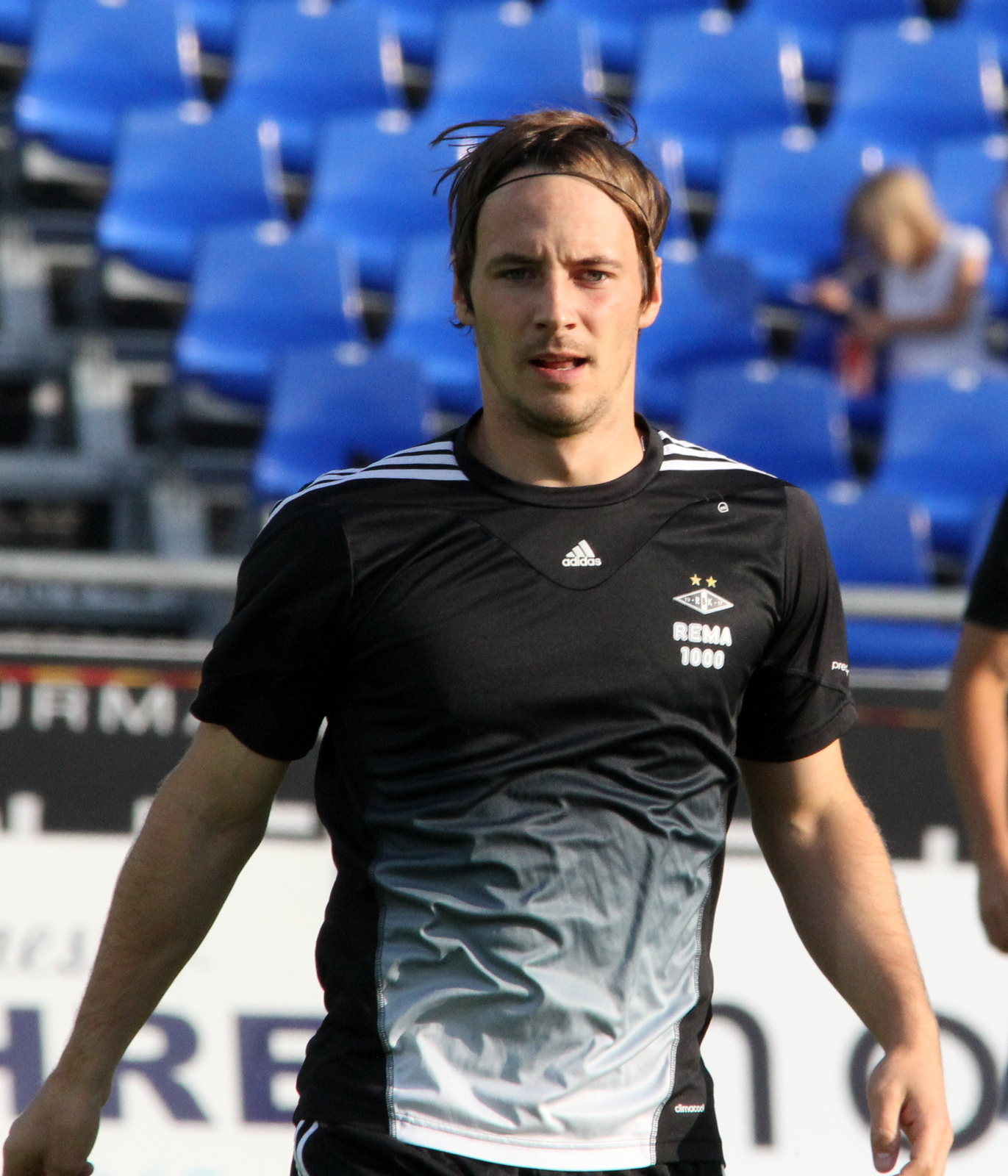
Mike Jensen won four consecutive Eliteserien titles for Rosenborg, including three as captain

- Mikkel Agger – Sarpsborg 08 – 2018–19
- Andreas Albech – Sarpsborg 08 – 2017–18
- Alexander Ammitzbøll – Haugesund, Aalesund – 2020, 2022
- Malte Amundsen – Rosenborg – 2018–19
- Bo Andersen – Viking, Tromsø, Sandnes Ulf – 2000–02, 2005, 2012
- Erik Bo Andersen – Odd Grenland – 2000–01
- Jeppe Andersen – Sarpsborg 08 – 2023–24
- Peter Ankersen – Rosenborg – 2012
- Daniel Arrocha – Jerv – 2022
- Ulrik Balling – Tromsø – 1997
- Nicklas Bendtner – Rosenborg – 2017–19
- Søren Berg – Viking – 2006–07
- Morten Bertolt – Ham-Kam, Sandnes Ulf – 2006, 2012
- **Valdemar Birksø** – **Fredrikstad** – 2025–
- Allan Borgvardt – Viking – 2005
- Martin Borre – Start – 2007
- **Muamer Brajanac** – **Vålerenga** – 2025–
- **Mikkel Bro Hansen** – **Bodø/Glimt** – 2025–
- Tonny Brochmann – Sogndal, Stabæk, Mjøndalen – 2011–14, 2017–18, 2019–21
- Jakob Busk – Sandefjord – 2015
- Frederik Børsting – Brann – 2023
- **Anders Bærtelsen** – Haugesund, **Viking** – 2021–25, 2025–
- **Frederik Carstensen** – **Sarpsborg 08** – 2024–
- **Frederik Christensen** – **Tromsø** – 2025–
- **Jacob Steen Christensen** – **Molde** – 2025–
- Magnus Christensen – Haugesund – 2022–23
- Martin Christensen – Haugesund – 2010
- Søren Christensen – Haugesund – 2015
- **Peter Christiansen** – **Viking** – 2024–
- Denni Conteh – Molde – 2006
- **Rezan Corlu** – **Kristiansund** – 2025–
- Svenn Crone – Brann – 2023–25
- Rasmus Daugaard – Lyn – 2006–07
- Mikkel Desler – Haugesund – 2019–21
- Frederik Elkær – Lillestrøm – 2023–24
- **Mads Enggård** – **Molde** – 2024–
- Steffen Ernemann – Sarpsborg 08, Viking – 2013–16, 2017
- Julius Eskesen – Haugesund – 2022–2025
- Oliver Feldballe – Sarpsborg 08 – 2014–15
- Jonathan Fischer – Fredrikstad – 2024–2025
- Mikkel Fischer – Haugesund – 2024–2025
- **Frederik Flex** – **Kristiansund** – 2025–
- Christian Flindt-Bjerg – Viking, Odd Grenland – 1997–2005
- Emil Frederiksen – Rosenborg – 2023–2025
- Allan Gaarde – Viking – 2005–08
- Jens Martin Gammelby – HamKam – 2023
- Pascal Gregor – Haugesund – 2019
- Albert Grønbæk – Bodø/Glimt – 2022–24
- Christian Gytkjær – Sandnes Ulf, Haugesund, Rosenborg – 2012, 2013–15, 2016–17
- Frederik Gytkjær – Haugesund – 2017–18
- Mathias Haarup – Jerv – 2022
- Anders Hagelskjær – Sarpsborg 08, Molde – 2022, 2023–24
- Benjamin Hansen – Haugesund, Molde – 2019–21, 2022–23
- **Mads Hansen** – **Brann** – 2025–
- Martin Hansen – Strømsgodset – 2019
- Rune Hansen – Sandefjord – 2009–10
- **Jakob Haugaard** – **Tromsø** – 2022–
- **Oscar Hedvall** – **Vålerenga** – 2025–
- Lasse Heinze – Sarpsborg 08 – 2015
- Carlo Holse – Rosenborg – 2020–23
- Frederik Holst – Lillestrøm – 2022
- **Emil Holten** – **Fredrikstad** – 2025–
- Mads Dittmer Hvilsom – Brann – 2016
- **Kasper Høgh** – Stabæk, **Bodø/Glimt** – 2023, 2024–
- Frederik Ihler – Molde – 2024
- Alexander Jakobsen – Bodø/Glimt – 2016
- Michael Jakobsen – Lillestrøm – 2016
- Martin Jensen – Sandefjord – 2007, 2009–10
- Mike Jensen – Rosenborg – 2013–19
- Søren Jensen – Odd Grenland – 2009
- Victor Jensen – Rosenborg – 2022
- Allan Jepsen – Vålerenga – 2006–09
- Dan Anton Johansen – Lillestrøm – 2007
- Timmi Johansen – Stabæk – 2014–15
- Henrik Jørgensen – Fyllingen – 1991
- Kasper Jørgensen – Aalesunds – 2020
- Mads Jørgensen – Stabæk – 2004
- **Mathias Jørgensen** – **Bodø/Glimt** – 2025–
- Alexander Juel Andersen – Aalesund – 2022–23
- Marco Priis Jørgensen – Mjøndalen – 2015
- Kasper Junker – Stabæk, Bodø/Glimt – 2019, 2020
- Pierre Kanstrup – Vålerenga – 2019
- Sanel Kapidžić – Mjøndalen – 2015
- Christian Keller – Stabæk – 2006–09
- Henrik Kildentoft – Haugesund – 2013–14
- Mikkel Kirkeskov – Aalesund – 2016–17
- Luca Kjerrumgaard – Stabæk – 2024
- Jeppe Kjær - Bodø/Glimt, Sandefjord, Fredrikstad - 2023–2025
- Oliver Kjærgaard – HamKam – 2023–2024
- **Anders Klynge** – **Bodø/Glimt** – 2025–
- Tobias Klysner – Aalesund – 2023
- **Emil Kornvig** – **Brann** – 2024–
- Claes Kronberg – Sarpsborg 08, Viking – 2011, 2013–17
- **Carl Lange** – **Vålerenga** – 2025–
- Thor Lange – Stabæk – 2012, 2014–15, 2023
- Jim Larsen – Rosenborg – 2011
- Morten Larsen – Start – 2002
- Victor Lind – HamKam – 2022
- Anders Lindegaard – Aalesund – 2009–10
- **Valdemar Lund** – **Molde** – 2024–
- Kasper Lunding – Odd, Aalesund – 2020, 2023
- Steven Lustü – Lyn – 2002–06
- Mikkel Maigaard – Strømsgodset, Sarpsborg 08 – 2019–21, 2021–23
- Henrik Meister – Sarpsborg 08 – 2023–24
- Jan Michaelsen – Ham-Kam – 2004–06, 2008
- Tobias Mikkelsen – Rosenborg – 2013–15
- Gustav Mogensen – Sarpsborg 08 – 2023
- **Jonas Mortensen** – **Rosenborg** – 2025–
- Patrick Mortensen – Sarpsborg 08 – 2015–18
- Alexander Munksgaard – Aalesund – 2023
- Marcus Mølvadgaard – Strømsgodset – 2020
- David Nielsen – Start, Strømsgodset, Brann – 2006–07, 2008, 2009–10, 2011
- Emil Nielsen – Rosenborg – 2015–16
- Nicki Bille Nielsen – Rosenborg – 2013
- **Andreas Nibe** – **Sarpsborg 08** – 2025–
- Mads Nielsen – Fredrikstad – 2024–25
- Matti Lund Nielsen – Sarpsborg 08 – 2016–19
- **Villads Nielsen** – **Bodø/Glimt** – 2024–
- Allan Olesen – Haugesund – 2010
- Patrick Olsen – Strømsgodset, Haugesund – 2014, 2015
- **Michael Opoku** – **Sarpsborg 08** – 2025–
- Daniel A. Pedersen – Lillestrøm, Brann – 2018-2019, 2020–21
- Kasper Pedersen – Stabæk – 2021, 2023
- Mads Pedersen – Sandefjord – 2014–15
- Magnus Pedersen – Sogndal – 2016–17
- Patrick Pedersen – Viking – 2016–17
- Nicolai Poulsen – Sarpsborg 08 – 2017
- Brian Priske – Start – 2011
- **Luka Racic** – **Rosenborg** – 2024–
- Jacob Rasmussen – Rosenborg – 2017–18
- Christoffer Remmer – Molde – 2016–19
- Søren Reese – Haugesund – 2022–23
- Emil Rohd – Haugesund – 2025
- Joachim Rothmann – Tromsø IL – 2021
- **Noah Sahsah** – **Rosenborg** – 2024–
- Tobias Salquist – Lillestrøm – 2019
- Peter Sand – Stabæk – 2002–04
- Mathias Sauer – Haugesund – 2024–25
- Ronnie Schwartz – Sarpsborg 08 – 2018
- **Japhet Sery Larsen** – **Brann**, Bodø/Glimt – 2021, 2022, 2023-
- **Jacob Sørensen** – **Brann** – 2025–
- Anton Skipper – Sarpsborg 08 – 2022–24
- Andreas Skovgaard – Stabæk – 2023
- Peter Skov-Jensen – Sandefjord – 2007
- Sammy Skytte – Stabæk, Bodø/Glimt – 2019, 2020, 2020–21
- Oskar Snorre – Haugesund – 2019
- Jacob Haahr Steffensen – Bryne – 2025
- Nicklas Strunck – Bryne – 2025
- Adam Sørensen - Bodø/Glimt - 2023–25
- **Elias Sørensen** – **Vålerenga** – 2025–
- Jacob Sørensen – Odd Grenland, Haugesund – 2006–07, 2010–11
- Oliver Sørensen – HamKam – 2022
- Peter Sørensen – Ham-Kam – 2004–05
- Martin Spelmann – Strømsgodset – 2019
- Kris Stadsgaard – Rosenborg – 2008–10
- Nicolai Stokholm – Viking – 2006–08
- Casper Tengstedt – Rosenborg – 2022
- Rasmus Thellufsen – Bryne – 2025
- Peter Therkildsen – Haugesund – 2020–23
- Nicolaj Thomsen – Vålerenga – 2021
- Dan Thomassen – Vålerenga – 2007–08
- Jess Thorup – Ham-Kam – 2005
- Mads Timm – Viking, Lyn – 2004–05
- Ole Tobiasen – Sandefjord – 2006
- Victor Torp – Sarpsborg 08 – 2022–23
- Youssef Toutouh – Stabæk – 2019
- Christian Traoré – Hønefoss – 2010
- **Kevin Tshiembe** – **Vålerenga** – 2025–
- Michael Tørnes – Sandefjord – 2015
- Mikkel Vendelbo – Hønefoss – 2012–13
- **Mike Vestergård** – **Sarpsborg 08** – 2025–
- Niklas Vesterlund – Tromsø – 2021–23
- Michael Vesterskov – Fredrikstad – 1981–82
- Jens Waltorp – Stabæk – 2006
- Magnus Warming – Brann – 2023–24
- Daniel Wass – Fredrikstad – 2009
- Mathias Wichmann – Jerv – 2022
- Felix Winther – Tromsø – 2021–24
- Philip Zinckernagel – Bodø/Glimt – 2018–20, 2024
- Bora Zivkovic – Fredrikstad – 2004–06
- **Oskar Øhlenschlæger** – **Fredrikstad** – 2025–
- Martin Ørnskov – Viking – 2012–13

== DR Congo ==
- Richard Ekunde – Viking – 2013
- Michee Ngalina – Haugesund – 2023

== Egypt ==
- Alexander Jakobsen – Bodø/Glimt, Sarpsborg 08 – 2016, 2020

== El Salvador ==
- Jaime Alas – Rosenborg – 2012–13

== England ==
- Ben Amos – Molde – 2010
- Aidan Barlow – Tromsø – 2019
- Neil Cartwright – Sogndal – 1991
- Lee Chapman – Strømsgodset – 1996
- Tony Cheek – Djerv 1919 – 1988
- Gary Chivers – Lyn – 1993
- Martin Chivers – Vard Haugesund – 1981–82
- Paul Davis – Stabæk – 1995
- Corey Donoghue – Strømsgodset – 2001
- Curtis Edwards – Stabæk – 2023
- Andrew Eleftheriou – Sandefjord – 2018
- Gary Ford – Tromsø – 1993
- Kenny Gasser – Kongsvinger – 1992
- Gary Goodchild – Viking – 1981–85
- George Green – Viking – 2017
- Bobby Hodge – Fredrikstad – 1982
- Ross Jenkins – Viking – 2017
- Chris Joyce – Odd Grenland – 2006–08
- Elliot Kebbie – Sandefjord – 2017
- James Keene – Fredrikstad – 2011
- Stephen Kinsey – Molde – 1993
- Michael Ledger – Viking – 2017
- David Macciochi – Sogndal – 1991
- Neil MacLeod – Brann – 1976–1981, 1983
- David Mannix – HamKam – 2008
- Gary Martin – Lillestrøm – 2016
- Paul Miller – Skeid – 1978
- Kieffer Moore – Viking – 2015
- Trevor Morley – Brann, Sogndal – 1992, 1993, 1995, 1998
- Paul Moulden – Molde – 1992
- Alex Nimely – Stabæk – 2017
- Adrian Pennock – Molde – 1991
- Mark Robson – Rosenborg – 1991
- Luke Rodgers – Lillestrøm SK – 2012
- Dale Rudge – Djerv 1919 – 1988
- Pat Schanzenbecker – Brann – 1979
- Aaron Wilbraham – Moss – 2000
- John Williams – Strømsgodset – 1991
- Ben Wright – Viking, Start – 2001–02, 2005

== Equatorial Guinea ==
- Federico Bikoro – Sandefjord – 2022–23

== Estonia ==
- Henri Anier – Viking – 2012
- Nikita Baranov – Kristiansund – 2017–18
- Alo Bärengrub – Bodø/Glimt – 2008–09
- Aleksandr Dmitrijev – Hønefoss – 2008, 2008–11
- Matvei Igonen – Lillestrøm – 2018–19
- Enar Jääger – Aalesund, Vålerenga – 2007–09, 2010–12, 2015–18
- Ragnar Klavan – Vålerenga – 2004
- Artur Kotenko – Sandnes Ulf, Viking – 2008, 2009–10
- Marek Lemsalu – Strømsgodset, Start, Bryne – 1999, 2001, 2002–05
- Joel Lindpere – Tromsø – 2007–09
- Pavel Londak – Bodø/Glimt, Rosenborg – 2008–15, 2016–17
- Karol Mets – Viking – 2015–17
- Henrik Ojamaa – Sarpsborg 08 – 2015
- Raio Piiroja – Vålerenga, Fredrikstad – 2003, 2004–11
- Sander Post – Aalesund – 2011–12
- **Rocco Robert Shein** – **Fredrikstad** – 2025–
- Taijo Teniste – Sogndal, Brann – 2011–14, 2016–20
- Sergei Terehhov – Brann – 2000–02
- Kristen Viikmäe – Vålerenga, Fredrikstad – 2000, 2002–03, 2005

== Faroe Islands ==
- **Jóannes Bjartalíð** – **Fredrikstad** – 2024–
- Atli Danielsen – Sogndal – 2004–05
- Jóan Símun Edmundsson – Viking – 2012, 2013
- Hans Fróði Hansen – Sogndal – 2000–01
- Brandur Hendriksson – Fredrikstad – 2024–25
- Julian Johnsson – Kongsvinger, Sogndal – 1998–99, 2001
- Todi Jónsson – Start – 2005–06
- Jákup Mikkelsen – Molde – 2001–03
- Kurt Mørkøre – Sogndal – 1999–2001
- Meinhard Olsen – Kristiansund – 2019
- Gilli Rólantsson – Brann, Odd – 2016–20, 2021–22

== Finland ==
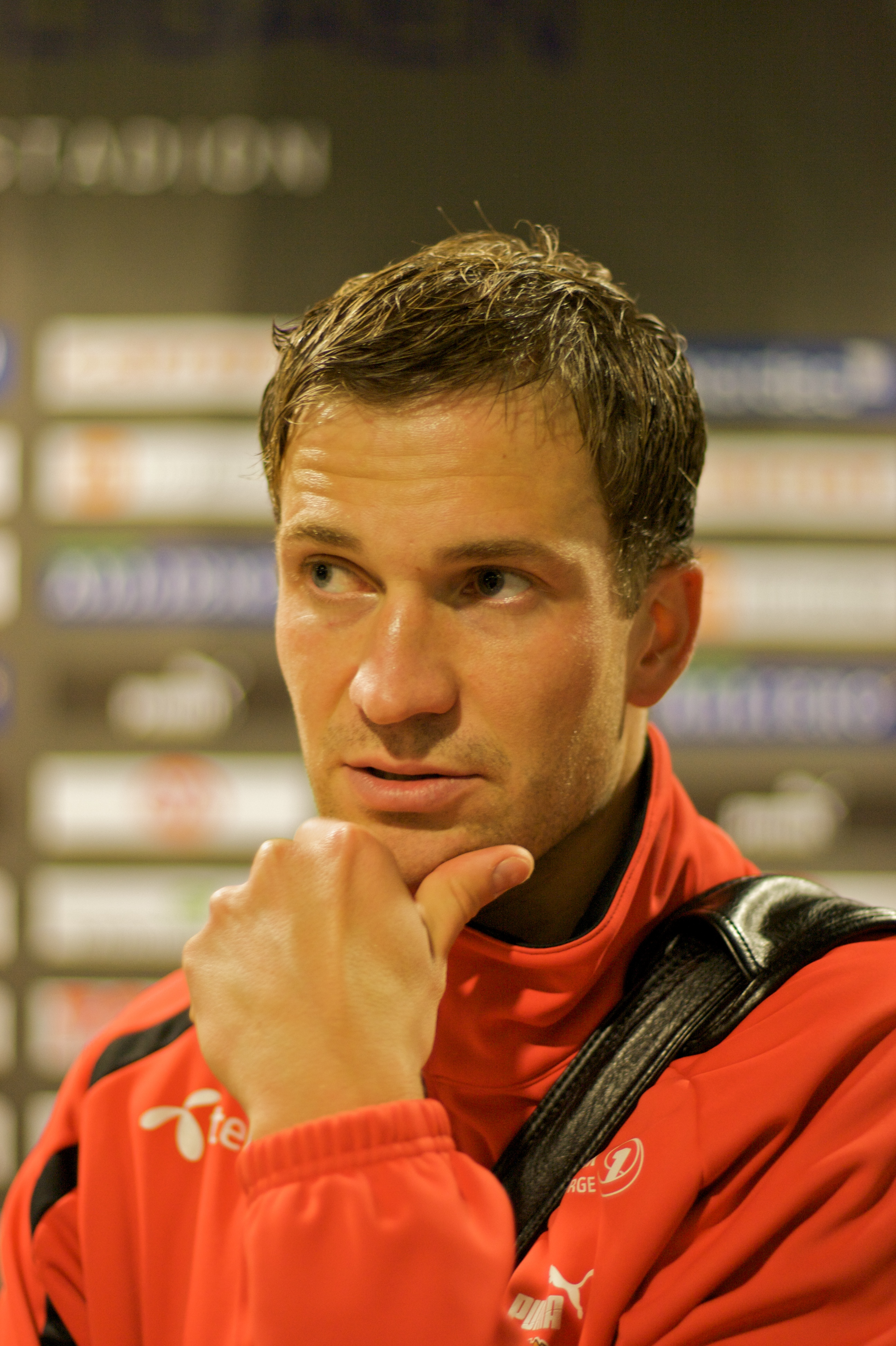
Miika Koppinen played 319 matches for Tromsø and Rosenborg

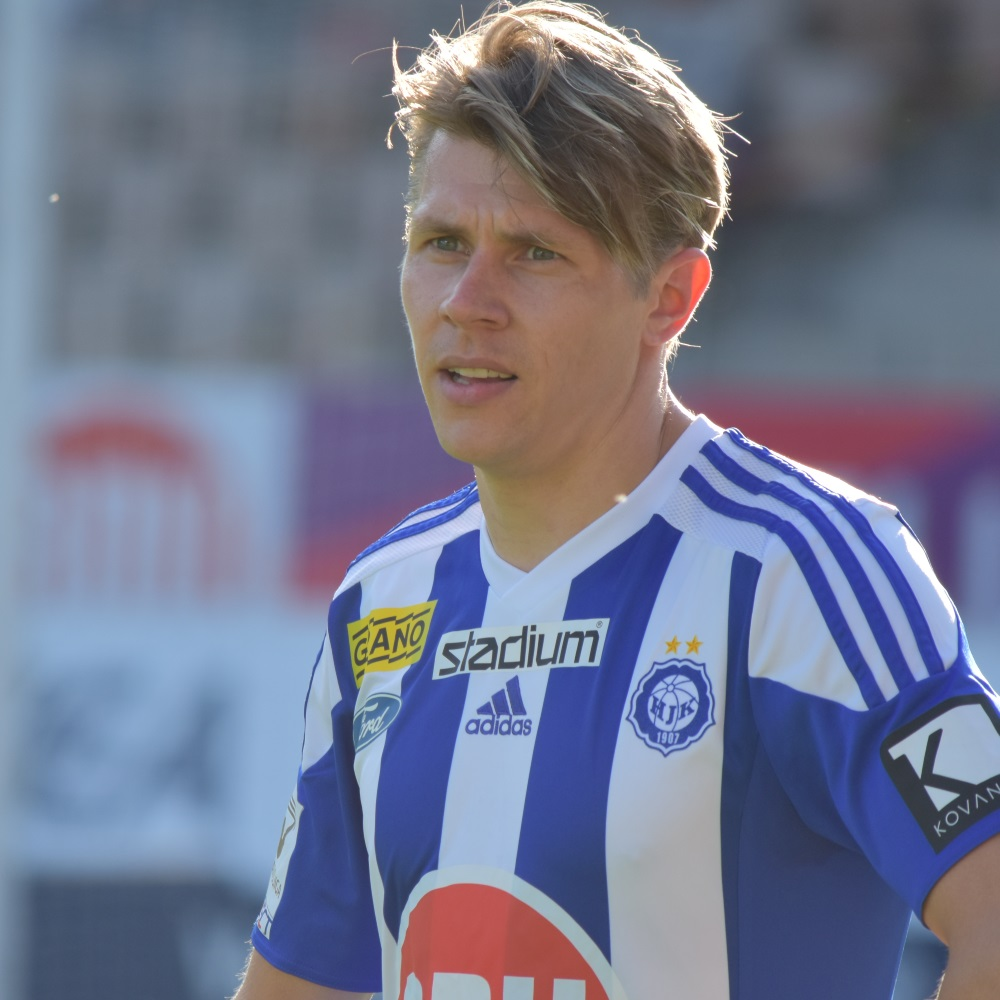
Riku Riski played 140 matches for Hønefoss, Rosenborg and Odd

- Kari Arkivuo – Sandefjord – 2006–07
- Lauri Dalla Valle – Molde – 2013
- **Carljohan Eriksson – Sarpsborg**, Sandefjord – 2024–
- Otto Fredrikson – Lillestrøm, Vålerenga, Tromsø – 2006–09, 2015, 2017–19
- Tuomas Haapala – Sandefjord – 2006–07
- Jukka Hakala – Start, Sogndal – 2002, 2004
- Niko Hämäläinen – Haugesund – 2025
- Pyry Hannola – Haugesund – 2025
- Dani Hatakka – Brann – 2016–18
- Tapio Heikkilä – Start – 2016
- Markus Heikkinen – Start – 2013
- Janne Hietanen – Tromsø – 2005
- Jarkko Hurme – Odd – 2014–15
- Keijo Huusko – Lyn, Strømsgodset, Tromsø – 2005, 2007–09
- Daniel Håkans – Jerv, Vålerenga – 2022, 2023
- Ville Jalasto – Aalesund, Stabæk – 2009–12, 2014–15
- Toni Kallio – Molde Viking – 2004–06, 2010
- Kaan Kairinen – Lillestrøm – 2021–22
- Benjamin Källman – Viking, Haugesund – 2019, 2020
- Mikko Kavén – Vålerenga – 1999–2000
- Hugo Keto – Sandefjord – 2022–2024
- Toni Kolehmainen – Hønefoss – 2012–13
- Tuomo Könönen – Odd – 2006–07
- Miika Koppinen – Tromsø, Rosenborg, Tromsø – 2000–14
- Peter Kopteff – Viking, Aalesund – 2002–05, 2008–09
- **Miika Koskela** – **Tromsø**, Haugesund – 2023–
- Tero Koskela – Fredrikstad – 2004–05
- Toni Koskela – Molde – 2008
- Sampo Koskinen – Sandefjord – 2007
- Mika Kottila – Brann – 1999
- Toni Kuivasto – Viking – 2001–03
- Ville Lehtinen – Bodø/Glimt – 2002–04
- Mathias Lindström – Fredrikstad – 2005
- Sami Mahlio – Odd Grenland – 1999–2002
- Tero Mäntylä – Aalesund – 2015–17
- Jon Masalin – HamKam, Fredrikstad – 2008, 2011–12
- Sakari Mattila – Aalesund – 2014–15
- Tony Miettinen – Odd – 2024
- Miikka Multaharju – Fredrikstad – 2006–07
- Henri Myntti – Tromsø – 2001
- Kari Niskala – Brann – 1978
- **Noah Pallas** – **Vålerenga** – 2025–
- Juha Pasoja – Ham-Kam – 2006, 2008
- Hannu Patronen – Sogndal – 2012–17
- Mike Peltola – Bodø/Glimt – 2001–03
- Timo Pirilä – FK Mjølner – 1989
- Juha Pirinen – Tromsø – 2019
- Jukka Raitala – Sogndal – 2016–17
- Pasi Rasimus – Lillestrøm – 1990
- Aki Riihilahti – Vålerenga – 1999–2000
- Riku Riski – Hønefoss, Rosenborg, Odd – 2012–17
- Roope Riski – Hønefoss, Haugesund – 2012, 2015
- Janne Saarinen – Rosenborg – 2001–03
- Agon Sadiku – Rosenborg – 2023–2024
- Juska Savolainen – Rosenborg, Haugesund – 2010
- Henri Sillanpää – Tromsø – 2012
- Naatan Skyttä – Viking – 2022
- Christian Sund – Stabæk – 2006
- Kimmo Tauriainen – Start – 2002
- Robert Taylor – Tromsø, Brann – 2018–19, 2020–21
- Hannu Tihinen – Viking – 2000, 2001–02
- Joona Toivio – Molde – 2013–17
- Henri Toivomäki – Sarpsborg 08 – 2016–18
- Diogo Tomas – Odd – 2023
- Jasse Tuominen – Tromsø – 2022
- Marko Tuomela – Tromsø – 1998–99, 2000
- **Santeri Väänänen** – **Rosenborg** – 2023–
- Ville Väisänen – Bryne – 2003
- Onni Valakari – Tromsø – 2018–19
- Hermanni Vuorinen – Fredrikstad – 2006–07
- Jarkko Wiss – Lillestrøm, Molde – 1999–2000
- Harri Ylönen – Brann – 1999–2001

== France ==
- Hervé Bacqué – Lyn – 1999
- Anthony Basso – Viking – 2005–06
- Jérémy Berthod – Sarpsborg 08 – 2013–15
- Alexy Bosetti – Sarpsborg 08 – 2016
- Derek Decamps – Haugesund, Sarpsborg 08, Sandnes Ulf – 2011–12, 2013, 2014
- Axel Guessand – Kristiansund – 2025
- Florent Hanin – Strømsgodset – 2015
- Cyril Kali – Lillestrøm – 2007
- Alexandre Letellier – Sarpsborg 08 – 2019
- Malaury Martin – Sandnes Ulf, Lillestrøm – 2014, 2015–17
- Rashad Muhammed – Sarpsborg 08 – 2018, 2021–22
- Christophe Psyché – Sogndal, Kristiansund, Tromsø – 2014, 2016–17, 2018–21, 2021–25

== Gabon ==
- Serge-Junior Martinsson Ngouali – Sarpsborg 08 – 2022–24
- Gilles Mbang Ondo – Stabæk, Sandnes Ulf – 2011–12

== The Gambia ==
- Jibril Bojang – Start, Mjøndalen – 2016, 2019
- Sulayman Bojang – Sarpsborg 08, Haugesund – 2018–20, 2021
- Abdou Darboe – Hønefoss – 2010
- Njogu Demba-Nyrén – Brann – 2008
- Dadi Gaye – Tromsø, Strømsgodset, KFUM, Bryne – 2023–25
- Tijan Jaiteh – Brann, Sandnes Ulf – 2007–12, 2014
- Maudo Jarjué – Sandefjord – 2024–25
- **Abubacarr Sedi Kinteh** – **Tromsø** – 2025–
- **Momodou Lion Nije** – **KFUM**, Sarpsborg 08 – 2024–
- **Alagie Sanyang** – **Sarpsborg 08** – 2024–
- Saihou Sarr – Mjøndalen – 1976–81
- Sheriff Sinyan – Lillestrøm, Molde – 2016, 2019, 2020–21, 2023
- Ebrima Sohna – Sandefjord – 2007, 2009–10
- Alagie Sosseh – Mjøndalen – 2015
- Pa Dembo Touray – Vålerenga – 2004

== Georgia ==
- Giorgi Gorozia – Stabæk – 2014–17
- Levan Melkadze – Vålerenga – 2006

== Germany ==
- Sascha Burchert – Vålerenga – 2015
- Jonas Deumeland – Start – 2018, 2020
- Luis Görlich – Bryne – 2025
- Lennart Grill – Brann – 2021
- Hendrik Helmke – Tromsø – 2013
- Stefan Jambo – Strømsgodset – 1990
- René Klingbeil – Viking – 2007–08
- Andreas Mayer – Stabæk, Rosenborg – 1996–99
- Sascha Mockenhaupt – Bodø/Glimt – 2016
- Heinz Müller – Odd Grenland, Lillestrøm – 2004–07
- Kristian Nicht – Viking – 2008–09
- Tobias Pachonik – Stabæk – 2023
- Jérome Polenz – Sarpsborg 08 – 2014
- Claus Reitmaier – Lillestrøm – 2005–06
- Uwe Rösler – Lillestrøm – 2002–03
- Sebastian Schindzielorz – Start – 2005
- Felix Schröter – Jerv – 2022
- Thomas Sobotzik – Sandefjord – 2007

== Ghana ==
- **Jalal Abdullai** – **Molde** – 2025–
- Mohammed Abu – Strømsgodset, Vålerenga – 2010–11, 2012, 2014–17, 2018, 2019–20
- Richard Ackon – Stabæk – 1997–2001
- Paul Addo – Odd Grenland − 2011–13
- Dominic Adiyiah – Fredrikstad – 2008–10
- James Ampofo – Strømsgodset – 2025
- **Nana Kwame Boakye** – **Brann** – 2025–
- Bismark Adjei-Boateng – Strømsgodset – 2012–17
- Enoch Kofi Adu – Stabæk – 2014
- David Agbo – Kristiansund – 2022
- Ernest Agyiri – Vålerenga – 2016–18
- Abdul Karim Ahmed – Kongsvinger, Viking – 1998–2001, 2002
- Anthony Annan – Start, Stabæk, Rosenborg – 2007–11, 2015
- Isaac Annan – Kristiansund – 2022
- Denny Antwi – Start – 2016–18
- Kwesi Appiah – Viking – 2017
- Ernest Asante – Start, Stabæk – 2011, 2013–16
- Isaac Atanga – Aalesund – 2023
- Christopher Bonsu Baah – Sarpsborg 08 – 2023
- Ernest Boahene – Strømsgodset – 2022–24
- Isaac Boakye – Vålerenga – 2011
- Robert Boateng – Rosenborg – 1997–2000
- Emmanuel Danso – Strømsgodset – 2022–25
- Afo Dodoo – Tromsø – 1999
- Shadrach Eghan – Stabæk – 2016
- King Gyan – Viking – 2011–13
- Edwin Gyasi – Aalesund – 2016–17
- Raymond Gyasi – Stabæk – 2017–19
- Zakari Hamza – Tromsø – 2013
- Michael Helegbe – Brann – 2005
- Kamal Issah – Stabæk – 2015–16
- Mohammed-Awal Issah – Rosenborg – 2011
- Kwame Karikari – Haugesund – 2016
- Gilbert Koomson – Sogndal, Brann, Bodø/Glimt, Aalesund, Sandefjord – 2013, 2016–17, 2018–20, 2021–23, 2022, 2023
- Patrick Kpozo – Tromsø – 2017
- Enock Kwakwa – Strømsgodset – 2012–13
- Adam Larsen Kwarasey – Strømsgodset, Rosenborg, Vålerenga – 2007–14, 2016, 2017–19
- Derrick Mensah – Haugesund – 2016–17
- Ibrahim Mensah – Start – 2018
- Abdul Zakaria Mugees – Odd – 2023–24
- Divine Naah – Strømsgodset – 2014
- Alex Nyarko – Start – 2005
- Mahatma Otoo – Sogndal – 2013–17
- **Leonard Owusu** – Odd, **Fredrikstad** – 2023, 2025–
- Solomon Owusu – **Odd** – 2021–24
- Razak Nuhu – Strømsgodset – 2011–14
- Razak Pimpong – Viking, Aalesund – 2007–09, 2008
- Isaac Twum – Start, Mjøndalen – 2018, 2020–21
- **Maxwell Woledzi** – **Fredrikstad** – 2024–

== Greece ==
- Thanasis Papazoglou – Aalesund – 2017
- Christos Zafeiris – Haugesund – 2022

== Guatemala ==
- Nicholas Hagen – HamKam – 2022

== Guinea ==
- Ousmane Camara – Vålerenga – 2019–20
- Amadou Diallo – Jerv – 2022
- Mikael Dyrestam – Aalesund, Sarpsborg 08 – 2014–15, 2020–21
- Mohamed Didé Fofana – Sogndal – 2017
- Pa Konate – Rosenborg – 2020
- Maï Traoré – Viking, Tromsø, Fredrikstad – 2021–24, 2023, 2024–25

== Guinea-Bissau ==
- Francisco Júnior – Strømsgodset – 2014, 2016–18
- Prosper Mendy – Strømsgodset – 2019–21

== Guyana ==
- Reiss Greenidge – Sogndal – 2017

== Honduras ==
- Mario Martínez – Vålerenga – 2009
- Reinieri Mayorquín – Aalesund – 2009
- Maynor Suazo – Brann – 2006

== Hungary ==
- Zsolt Korcsmár – Brann – 2010–13
- Péter Kovács – Tromsø, Viking, Strømsgodset, Odd Grenland, Sarpsborg 08, Sandefjord – 2002–07, 2009–10, 2012–15, 2017
- Bálint Miskovicz – Mjøndalen – 1992
- Balázs Nikolov – Ham-Kam – 2006
- Tamás Szekeres – Strømsgodset, Tromsø, Fredrikstad – 2001, 2005–06, 2006–07
- Mihály Tóth – Fredrikstad – 2005–07

== Iceland ==
- Arnór Sveinn Aðalsteinsson – Hønefoss – 2012–13
- Steinar Dagur Adolfsson – Kongsvinger – 1999
- Axel Óskar Andrésson – Viking – 2019–20
- Árni Gautur Arason – Rosenborg, Vålerenga, Odd Grenland – 1998–03, 2004–07, 2008–10
- Adam Örn Arnarson – Aalesund, Tromsø – 2016–17, 2021
- Ásgeir Börkur Ásgeirsson – Sarpsborg 08 – 2013
- Marel Baldvinsson – Stabæk, Molde – 2000–02, 2006
- Birkir Bjarnason – Bodø/Glimt, Viking – 2006–11, 2023
- Brynjar Ingi Bjarnason – Vålerenga, HamKam – 2021–25
- Ólafur Örn Bjarnason – Brann – 2004–10
- Teddy Bjarnason – Lyn – 2008–09
- Ármann Smári Björnsson – Lillestrøm, Brann – 2000, 2002, 2006–09
- Haraldur Björnsson – Lillestrøm – 2016
- Jón Daði Böðvarsson – Viking – 2013-15
- Ríkharður Daðason – Viking, Lillestrøm, 1998–2000, 2002–03
- Einar Daníelsson – Lillestrøm – 2000
- Gylfi Einarsson – Lillestrøm, Brann – 2001–04, 2008–10
- Bjarni Ólafur Eiríksson – Stabæk – 2010–12
- Hólmar Örn Eyjólfsson – Rosenborg – 2014–17, 2020–21
- Kjartan Finnbogason – Sandefjord – 2009
- Kristján Finnbogason – Start – 2018
- Jón Guðni Fjóluson – Brann – 2020
- Hólmbert Friðjónsson – Aalesund, Lillestrøm – 2020, 2022
- Samúel Friðjónsson – Vålerenga, Viking – 2017–18, 2019–22
- Gunnar Gíslason – Moss – 1987–88
- Stefán Gíslason – Strømsgodset, Lyn, Viking, Lillestrøm – 1999–2001, 2005–07, 2010–11
- Valur Gíslason – Strømsgodset – 1998–99
- Daníel Leó Grétarsson – Aalesund – 2015–17, 2020
- Eiður Guðjohnsen – Molde – 2016
- **Sveinn Aron Guðjohnsen** – **Sarpsborg 08** – 2024–
- **Eggert Aron Guðmundsson** – **Brann** – 2025–
- Haraldur Freyr Guðmundsson – Aalesund, Start – 2005–09, 2011
- Jóhann Guðmundsson – Lyn – 2001–03
- Tryggvi Guðmundsson – Tromsø, Stabæk – 1998–2000, 2001–03
- Brynjar Gunnarsson – Vålerenga, Moss – 1998
- Patrik Gunnarsson – Viking – 2021–24
- Veigar Páll Gunnarsson – Strømsgodset, Stabæk, Vålerenga – 2001, 2004, 2006–11
- Bjarki Gunnlaugsson – Molde, Brann – 1997–99
- Ágúst Gylfason – Brann – 1995–98
- Hannes Þór Halldórsson – Brann, Sandnes Ulf, Bodø/Glimt – 2012, 2014–15, 2016
- Emil Hallfreðsson – Lyn – 2007
- Jóhannes Harðarson – Start – 2005–07
- Óskar Örn Hauksson – Sogndal, Sandnes Ulf – 2003, 2012
- Auðun Helgason – Viking – 1998–2000
- Elfar Freyr Helgason – Stabæk – 2012
- Guðni Rúnar Helgason – Start – 2002
- Heiðar Helguson – Lillestrøm – 1998–99
- Grétar Hjartarson – Lillestrøm – 2000
- Andrés Már Jóhannesson – Haugesund – 2011–12
- Kristall Máni Ingason – Rosenborg – 2022–23
- Sverrir Ingi Ingason – Viking – 2014
- Valdimar Þór Ingimundarson – Strømsgodset – 2020–21
- Garðar Jóhannsson – Fredrikstad, Strømsgodset – 2007–10
- **Viðar Ari Jónsson** – Brann, Sandefjord, **HamKam** – 2017, 2020–21, 2023–
- Gunnlaugur Jónsson – Kongsvinger – 1998
- Ingvar Jónsson – Start, Sandefjord – 2015, 2017–18
- Kristinn Jónsson – Sarpsborg 08, Sogndal – 2016–17
- Sævar Jónsson – Brann – 1986
- 'Hlynur Freyr Karlsson – Haugesund – 2024
- Óttar Magnús Karlsson – Molde – 2017
- Viðar Örn Kjartansson – Vålerenga – 2014, 2020–22
- Birkir Kristinsson – Brann – 1996–97
- Rúnar Kristinsson – Lillestrøm – 1997–2000
- Guðmundur Kristjánsson – Start – 2013–16
- Ari Leifsson – Strømsgodset – 2020-23
- Anton Logi Lúðvíksson – Haugesund – 2024
- Júlíus Magnússon – Fredrikstad – 2024–25
- Stefán Logi Magnússon – Lillestrøm – 2009–12
- **Sævar Atli Magnússon** – **Brann** – 2025–
- Finnur Orri Margeirsson – Lillestrøm – 2015
- Pétur Marteinsson – Stabæk – 1999–2001
- **Hilmir Rafn Mikaelsson** – Tromsø, Kristiansund, **Viking** – 2023, 2024, 2025–
- Davíð Kristján Ólafsson – Aalesund – 2020
- Elías Már Ómarsson – Vålerenga – 2015–17
- Orri Sigurður Ómarsson – Sarpsborg 08 – 2018–19
- Pálmi Rafn Pálmason – Stabæk, Lillestrøm – 2008–11, 2012–14
- Emil Pálsson – Sandefjord, Sarpsborg 08 – 2018, 2020, 2021–22
- Arnar Darri Pétursson – Lyn – 2009
- Guðmundur Pétursson – Sandefjord – 2007
- Alfons Sampsted – Bodø/Glimt – 2020–22
- Eiður Sigurbjörnsson – Sandnes Ulf – 2014
- Oliver Sigurjónsson – Bodø/Glimt – 2019
- Aron Sigurðarson – Tromsø, Start – 2016–18
- Björn Bergmann Sigurðarson – Lillestrøm, Molde – 2009–12, 2014, 2016–17, 2021–22
- Bjarni Sigurðsson – Brann – 1985–88, 1994
- Hannes Sigurðsson – Viking, Sandnes Ulf – 2002–05, 2007–08, 2014
- Helgi Sigurðsson – Stabæk, Lyn – 1997–99, 2001–03
- Indriði Sigurðsson – Lillestrøm, Lyn, Viking – 2000–03, 2006–09, 2009–15
- **Stefán Ingi Sigurðarson** – **Sandefjord** – 2025–
- Kristján Örn Sigurðsson – Brann, Hønefoss – 2005–10, 2012–13
- Andri Sigþórsson – Molde – 2001–03
- Arnór Smárason – Lillestrøm – 2018–19
- Ólafur Stígsson – Molde – 2002–03
- Hörður Sveinsson – Tromsø – 2007
- Björn Daníel Sverrisson – Viking – 2014–16
- Birkir Már Sævarsson – Brann – 2008–13
- Guðmundur Þórarinsson – Sarpsborg 08, Rosenborg – 2013–14, 2016
- Ólafur Þórðarson – Brann, Lyn – 1989–92
- Stefán Þórðarson – Brann, Kongsvinger – 1998, 1999
- Bjarni Þorsteinsson – Molde – 2001–03
- Steinþór Freyr Þorsteinsson – Sandnes Ulf, Viking – 2012–13, 2014–15
- Gunnar Heiðar Þorvaldsson – Vålerenga – 2007–08
- **Ísak Þorvaldsson** – **Rosenborg** – 2023–
- Aron Elís Þrándarson – Aalesund – 2015–17
- Dagur Dan Thórhallsson – Mjøndalen – 2020
- Logi Tómasson – Strømsgodset – 2023–2025
- Arnór Ingvi Traustason – Sandnes Ulf – 2012
- Guðbjörn Tryggvason – Start – 1985
- Þórarinn Ingi Valdimarsson – Sarpsborg 08 – 2013–14
- Hjörtur Logi Valgarðsson – Sogndal – 2014
- Arnar Viðarsson – Lillestrøm – 1998
- Davíð Viðarsson – Lillestrøm – 2002–04
- Árni Vilhjálmsson – Lillestrøm – 2015–17
- Matthías Vilhjálmsson – Start, Rosenborg, Vålerenga – 2013–15, 2015–18, 2019–20
- Brynjólfur Willumsson – Kristiansund – 2021–22, 2024

== India ==
- Gurpreet Singh Sandhu – Stabæk – 2016–17

== Indonesia ==
- Shayne Pattynama – Viking – 2021–23

== Iran ==
- Sosha Makani – Strømsgodset, Mjøndalen – 2017, 2020-2021

== Iraq ==
- Danilo Al-Saed – Sandefjord – 2023–24
- **Marko Farji** – **Strømsgodset** – 2023–
- Mohanad Jeahze – Lillestrøm – 2024
- **Aimar Sher** – **Sarpsborg 08** – 2024–

== Republic of Ireland ==
- John Devine – Start – 1987, 1989
- Gary Hogan – Sandefjord – 2015
- Ciarán Martyn – Fredrikstad – 2007
- Mike McCabe – Tromsø, Viking – 1988–90, 1991–93
- 'Sean McDermott – Sandnes Ulf, Kristiansund, Molde – 2012–14, 2017–18, 2019–22, 2024–25

== Israel ==
- Dan Alberto Fellus – Vålerenga, Lillestrøm – 2006, 2007–09

== Italy ==
- Michele Di Piedi – Odd Grenland – 2002
- Arnold Schwellensattl – Start – 2005

== Jamaica ==
- Rodolph Austin – Brann – 2008–11
- Deshorn Brown – Vålerenga – 2015–16
- Duwayne Kerr – Sarpsborg 08 – 2013–15
- Damion Lowe – Start – 2017–18
- Jason Morrison – Strømsgodset, Aalesund – 2010–13
- Demar Phillips – Aalesund – 2009–14
- Adrian Reid – Lillestrøm, Vålerenga – 2009, 2011
- Dane Richards – Bodø/Glimt – 2014
- Luton Shelton – Vålerenga – 2008, 2009–11
- Khari Stephenson – Aalesund – 2008–10
- Tremaine Stewart – Aalesund – 2012–14

== Japan ==
- Kosuke Kinoshita – Stabæk – 2019–21
- Daigo Kobayashi – Stabæk – 2009

== Kenya ==
- Robert Mambo Mumba – Viking – 2005–06
- Valdo Nyabaro – Start – 2000, 2002
- Arnold Origi – Fredrikstad, Lillestrøm – 2011, 2013–17
- Alfred Scriven – Mjøndalen, Bryne – 2019–21, 2025

== Kosovo ==
- Bajram Ajeti – Lillestrøm – 2017
- Besart Berisha – Rosenborg – 2008
- Valon Berisha – Viking – 2010–2012
- Zymer Bytyqi – Sandnes Ulf, Viking – 2012–17, 2019–20
- Erton Fejzullahu – Sarpsborg 08 – 2017
- Ardian Gashi – Molde, Vålerenga, Brann, Fredrikstad, Odd – 2001, 2003–09, 2014–17
- Ylldren Ibrahimaj – Viking, Lillestrøm – 2019–20, 2022–24
- **Blerton Isufi** – **Molde**, Sandefjord – 2025–
- Flamur Kastrati – Strømsgodset, Aalesund, Sandefjord, Kristiansund, Odd – 2013–16, 2016, 2017–18, 2018–21, 2021–22
- Kreshnik Krasniqi – Strømsgodset – 2020–2025
- Avni Pepa – Start, Sandnes Ulf – 2010–14
- Elbasan Rashani – Odd, Rosenborg – 2010–14, 2016–17, 2017–20
- Anel Rashkaj – Sandnes Ulf – 2012–14
- Lum Rexhepi – Lillestrøm – 2015
- Herolind Shala – Odd, Start, Vålerenga, Stabæk – 2011–14, 2018, 2019–20, 2021

== Latvia ==
- Eduards Dašķevičs – HamKam – 2022
- Jānis Ikaunieks – Strømsgodset – 2020

== Lebanon ==
- Adnan Haidar – Vålerenga, Stabæk – 2008, 2010–12
- Bassel Jradi – Strømsgodset, Lillestrøm – 2014–18
- Felix Michel Melki – Sarpsborg 08 – 2020

== Liberia ==
- Willis Forko – Bodø/Glimt – 2008–09
- Dulee Johnson – Start – 2016
- Sam Johnson, Vålerenga – 2018
- Amadaiya Rennie – Brann – 2015
- Peter Wilson – Jerv – 2022

== Libya ==
- Éamon Zayed – Aalesund – 2005

== Lithuania ==
- Ričardas Beniušis – Start – 2002
- Tadas Labukas – Brann – 2011
- Tomas Ražanauskas – Brann – 2000–01
- Igor Spiridonov – Bryne – 2025
- Andrius Velička – Viking – 2008
- Donatas Vencevičius – Start – 2002

== Luxembourg ==
- Lars Krogh Gerson – Kongsvinger, Brann – 2010, 2021

== Malawi ==
- John Maduka – Strindheim – 1995
- Francis Songo – Strindheim – 1995

== Mali ==
- Ismaila Coulibaly – Sarpsborg 08 – 2019–20
- Sory Ibrahim Diarra – Haugesund – 2023–2025
- Ibrahima Koné – Haugesund, Sarpsborg 08 – 2018–20, 2021
- Amadou Konaté – Bodø/Glimt – 2019–20
- Aboubacar Konté – Sarpsborg 08 – 2019–2022
- Yacouba Sylla – Strømsgodset – 2019

== Malta ==
- Michael Mifsud – Lillestrøm – 2004–06

== Mauritania ==
- El Hadji Ba – Stabæk – 2017

== Mexico ==
- Efraín Juárez – Vålerenga – 2019

== Montenegro ==
- Mehmed Divanović – Sarpsborg – 2011
- **Dino Islamović** – **Rosenborg** – 2020–21, 2025–
- Staniša Mandić – Sogndal – 2017
- Vladimir Rodić – Odd – 2020

== Montserrat ==
- Alex Dyer – Lillestrøm – 2019

== Morocco ==
- Jones El-Abdellaoui – Vålerenga – 2022–23
- Abderrazak Hamdallah – Aalesund – 2013
- El Mehdi Karnass – Aalesund – 2014
- **Salim Laghzaoui** – **Fredrikstad** – 2025–
- Youness Mokhtar – Stabæk – 2019
- Osame Sahraoui – Vålerenga – 2020–22
- Houcine Zaidoun – Aalesund – 2013

== Namibia ==
- Mohammed Ouseb – Lyn – 2001–03
- Oliver Risser – Lyn – 2009

== Netherlands ==
- Rodney Antwi – Jerv – 2022
- Jan de Boer – Bryne – 2025
- Leandro Fernandes – Jerv – 2022
- Boudewijn de Geer – Molde, Lillestrøm – 1977–79
- Daan Huisman – Haugesund – 2023
- Dennis Iliohan – Stabæk – 2001
- Quint Jansen – Mjøndalen, Sandefjord – 2019–20, 2022
- **Neraysho Kasanwirjo** – **Molde** – 2025–
- Daan Klinkenberg – Aalesund – 2020
- **Menno Koch** – **Sarpsborg 08** – 2024–
- Barry Maguire – Sarpsborg 08 – 2015
- Ludcinio Marengo – Brann – 2017–19
- Darren Maatsen – Stabæk – 2020
- **Luc Mares** – **HamKam** – 2024–
- Beau Molenaar – Haugesund – 2008–10
- Kaj Ramsteijn – Aalesund – 2017
- **Mees Rijks** – **Vålerenga** – 2025–
- Michael Timisela – Lillestrøm – 2015
- Edwin van Ankeren – Odd Grenland – 2000–03
- Crescendo van Berkel – Sandefjord – 2017–18
- Ian Smeulers – Sandefjord – 2021–23
- Joshua Smits – Bodø/Glimt – 2020-22
- Shaquill Sno – Aalesund – 2020
- Bart Straalman – Sarpsborg 08 – 2019
- Vito Wormgoor – Aalesund, Brann – 2016–19

== New Zealand ==
- **Joe Bell** – **Viking** – 2020–21, 2023–
- Craig Henderson – Stabæk, Mjøndalen – 2014–15

== Nigeria ==
- Suleiman Abdullahi – Viking – 2015–16
- Oluwasegun Abiodun – Ham-Kam – 2004–06, 2008
- Adamu Abubakar – Haugesund – 2015
- Akor Adams – Lillestrøm – 2022–23
- Samuel Adegbenro – Viking, Rosenborg – 2015–17, 2017–20, 2023
- Felix Ademola – Skeid, Haugesund, Ham-Kam – 1997, 2000
- Aremu Afeez – Start – 2018, 2020
- Adeleke Akinyemi – Start – 2018, 2020
- Izuchuckwu Anthony – Haugesund – 2016–18
- Ugonna Anyora – Haugesund – 2010–14
- Raphael Ayagwa – Lillestrøm – 2018–19
- Ezekiel Bala – Lyn – 2005–07,
- Effiom Otu Bassey – Lillestrøm – 2011
- Bentley – Odd, Brann – 2007–12, 2014–17
- Victor Boniface – Bodø/Glimt – 2019–22
- Uba Charles – Lillestrøm – 2023–25
- Dominic Chatto – Bodø/Glimt – 2014–15
- John Chibuike – Rosenborg – 2011–14
- Osita Henry Chikere – Viking – 2013–15
- **Daniel Daga** – **Molde** – 2025–
- Daniel Chima Chukwu – Molde – 2010–13, 2018
- Babajide David Akintola – Haugesund, Rosenborg – 2018, 2019
- Moses Ebiye – Lillestrøm, Tromsø, Aalesund – 2017–19, 2021–22, 2022–23
- Chidera Ejuke – Vålerenga – 2017–19
- Thompson Ekpe – Molde, Kristiansund – 2016–17
- Emmanuel Ekpo – Molde, Haugesund – 2012–14
- Charles Ezeh – Lillestrøm – 2017–18
- Edwin Eziyodawe – Lillestrøm – 2009–10
- Fred Friday – Lillestrøm, Strømsgodset – 2013–16, 2021–22
- Bala Garba – Haugesund, Start – 1997–98, 2000, 2005–06
- Hilary Gong – Haugesund – 2022
- Rilwan Hassan – HamKam – 2022
- Abubakar Ibrahim – Start – 2017–218
- Shuaibu Ibrahim – Haugesund, Mjøndalen – 2016–19, 2020–21
- Uduak Cyril Idemokon – Start – 2016–17
- Odion Ighalo – Lyn – 2007–08
- Emanuell Igiebor – Lillestrøm – 2009–11
- **Wilfred George Igor** – **Kristiansund** – 2024–
- Stanley Ihugba – Lyn, Sarpsborg 08 – 2009, 2011
- Peter Ijeh – Viking – 2006–09
- Anthony Ikedi – Haugesund – 2017, 2018–19
- Austin Ikenna – Start – 2015–17
- Bonke Innocent – Lillestrøm – 2014–17
- Jack Ipalibo – Strømsgodset – 2019–23
- Henry Isaac – Sandefjord – 2006
- **Mustapha Isah** – **Kristiansund** – 2025–
- Taofeek Ismaheel – Vålerenga – 2022
- Leke James – Aalesund, Molde – 2012–16, 2018–2020
- Kachi – Sarpsborg 08, Odd – 2015–16, 2020–22
- Jordan Attah Kadiri – Strømsgodset – 2021
- Akeem Latifu – Strømsgodset, Aalesund, Mjøndalen – 2010, 2013, 2014–15, 2019
- Efe Lucky – Lillestrøm – 2024
- Ifeanyi Mathew – Lillestrøm – 2016–19, 2021–23
- **Promise Meliga** – **Vålerenga** – 2025–
- Peter Godly Michael – Vålerenga – 2018
- Mikel John Obi – Lyn – 2005
- Chidiebere Nwakali – Start, Sogndal – 2016, 2017
- Henry Nwosu – Sandefjord – 2006
- Paul Obiefule – Lyn, Hønefoss, Lillestrøm – 2007–11
- Chinedu Obasi – Lyn – 2005–07
- **Onyebuchi Obasi** – **Vålerenga** – 2025–
- Simon Ogar – Bodø/Glimt – 2006
- Igoh Ogbu – Lillestrøm – 2021–22
- Edward Ofere – Sogndal – 2014
- Fegor Ogude – Vålerenga – 2010–13
- Mobi Okoli – Sandnes Ulf – 2010–12
- Solomon Okoronkwo – Aalesund – 2011–12
- Aaron Samuel Olanare – Vålerenga, Sarpsborg 08, Molde – 2012–13, 2013–14, 2024–25
- Kim Ojo – Brann – 2011
- Seyi Olofinjana – Brann, Start – 2003–04, 2014
- Oladapo Olufemi – Start – 2009–10
- Solomon Owello – Start – 2008–15
- Ganiyu Owolabi – Viking – 1997
- Uche Sabastine – Stabæk – 2021
- Usman Sale – Viking – 2016–17, 2019
- Ahmed Suleiman – Vålerenga – 2012–13
- **Peter Sunday** – **HamKam** – 2025–
- Marco Tagbajumi – Strømsgodset, Lillestrøm, Bodø/Glimt – 2015, 2017–18
- Samson Tijani – Fredrikstad – 2024
- William Troost-Ekong – Haugesund – 2015–16
- Franklin Tebo Uchenna – Sarpsborg 08 – 2023–2025
- Aniekpeno Udoh – Viking – 2016–17
- Anthony Ujah – Lillestrøm – 2010
- Mohammed Usman – Sarpsborg 08 – 2018–19
- Izunna Uzochukwu – Aalesund – 2020
- George White – Odd – 2011–13
- Sad'eeq Yusuf – Haugesund – 2015

== Northern Ireland ==
- Kyle Lafferty – Sarpsborg 08 – 2019
- Neil Matthews – Sogndal – 1992
- Robin Shroot – Sogndal, Viking – 2015, 2017

== North Macedonia ==
- Jasmin Mecinović – Sogndal – 2012
- Daniel Mojsov – Brann – 2013–14
- David Mitov Nilsson – Sarpsborg 08 – 2020
- Leonard Zuta – Vålerenga – 2021–23

== Oman ==
- Ali Al-Habsi – Lyn – 2003–05

== Pakistan ==
- Etzaz Hussain – Molde, Odd – 2011–15, 2017–2022, 2024

== Palestine ==
- **Moustafa Zeidan** – **Rosenborg** – 2024–

== Philippines ==
- Josef Baccay – Lillestrøm, Odd – 2019, 2021–24
- **Bjørn Martin Kristensen** – Aalesund, **KFUM Oslo** – 2022–23, 2025–

== Poland ==
- Zygmunt Anczok – Skeid – 1977–79
- Paweł Chrupałła – Rosenborg, Kristiansund, Sarpsborg 08 – 2022–25, 2022, 2024
- Marek Filipczak – Brann – 1990–92
- Jarosław Fojut – Tromsø – 2013–14
- Łukasz Jarosiński – Strømsgodset – 2015–17
- Radosław Janukiewicz – Strømsgodset – 2017
- Jerzy Kowalik – Tromsø – 1992
- Janusz Kudyba – Lyn – 1991
- Piotr Leciejewski – Brann – 2011–14, 2016–17
- Sebastian Mila – Vålerenga – 2007
- Marek Motyka – Brann – 1990
- **Albert Posiadała** – **Molde** – 2024–
- Jakub Serafin – Haugesund – 2017–18
- Kazimierz Sokołowski – Tromsø – 1992–94
- Tomasz Stolpa – Tromsø – 2004, 2006
- Marcel Wawrzynkiewicz – Vålerenga – 2013

== Portugal ==
- **Ieltsin Camões** – **Tromsø** – 2025–
- Daniel Fernandes – Lillestrøm – 2017
- Nuno Marques – Lyn – 2004–05
- João Meira – Vålerenga – 2018
- Duarte Moreira – Bryne – 2025
- Tomás Podstawski – Stabæk – 2021
- Joshua Silva – Bodø/Glimt – 2015

== Puerto Rico ==
- Zarek Valentin – Bodø/Glimt – 2014–15

== Romania ==
- Dorian Ștefan – Vålerenga – 1990
- Dumitru Moraru – Start – 1990–91

== Russia ==
- Dmitri Barannik – Strømsgodset – 1995–97
- **Nikita Haikin** – **Bodø/Glimt** – 2019–22, 2023–
- Yevgeni Kirisov – Stabæk – 2015
- Vadim Manzon – Bodø/Glimt – 2016
- Vasili Pavlov – Brann – 2013
- Igor Pyvin – Strindheim – 1995
- Artem Sokol – Tromsø – 2019
- Aleksandr Vasyutin – Sarpsborg 08 – 2018–19
- Aleksei Yeryomenko – Tromsø – 1998

== Rwanda ==
- Olivier Karekezi – Ham-Kam – 2008

== Scotland ==
- Arthur Albiston – Molde – 1992–93
- Alex Davey – Stabæk – 2016
- Paul Kane – Viking – 1996
- Liam Henderson – Rosenborg – 2015
- Steven Lennon – Sandnes Ulf – 2013–14
- Jim McCalliog – Lyn – 1978
- Charlie Miller – Brann – 2004–06
- Lee Robertson – Start, Molde, Bodø/Glimt – 1996–2000, 2002
- Maurice Ross – Viking – 2007–08
- Robbie Winters – Brann – 2002–08

== Senegal ==
- Stéphane Badji – Sogndal, Brann – 2012, 2013–14
- Badou – Bodø/Glimt – 2014–15
- Mamadou Thierno Barry – Tromsø – 2024–25
- Victor Demba Bindia – Sandefjord – 2009–10, 2015, 2017–18
- Ousseynou Boye – Mjøndalen – 2015
- Abdou Karim Camara – Molde – 2011–12
- Aliou Coly – Molde, Kristiansund – 2013, 2017–22
- Saliou Ciss – Tromsø – 2010–13
- Ibrahima Cissokho – Haugesund – 2022
- Ousseynou Cavin Diagné – Kristiansund – 2020
- Mamadou Diallo – Lillestrøm, Vålerenga – 1997–99
- Papa Maly Diamanka – Vålerenga – 2012
- Krépin Diatta – Sarpsborg 08 – 2017–18
- Madiodia Dia – Haugesund – 2025
- Mamadou Diaw – Aalesund – 2020, 2022
- Simon Diedhiou – Haugesund – 2015
- Mamadou Diagne Latyr – Fredrikstad – 2004
- Amidou Diop – Molde, Mjøndalen, Kristiansund, Aalesund, Sarpsborg 08 – 2014–17, 2015, 2017–19, 2020–22, 2023, 2024
- Djibril Diop – Viking – 2022–2024
- Moctar Diop – Aalesund – 2023
- El Hadji Malick Diouf – Tromsø – 2023
- Mame Biram Diouf – Molde – 2008–09
- Mignane Diouf – Tromsø – 2010
- Pape Paté Diouf – Molde, Odd – 2006, 2008–11, 2012, 2014–17
- Medhi Dioury – Tromsø – 2017
- Ibrahima Dramé – Brann – 2014–15
- Baye Djiby Fall – Molde – 2010
- Fallou Fall – Fredrikstad – 2024–2025
- Mouhamed Gueye – Fredrikstad – 2012
- Pape Habib Guèye – Kristiansund – 2024
- El-Hadji Gana Kane – Sandefjord – 2017–18
- Madiou Konate – Molde, Hønefoss – 2005–06, 2010
- Malick Mané – Sandefjord, Sogndal – 2009–10, 2012–14
- Serigne Mor Mbaye – Kristiansund – 2019–22
- Kara Mbodj – Tromsø – 2010–11
- Abdoulaye M'baye – Tromsø, Vålerenga, Aalesund – 2000–01, 2003, 2005
- Remond Mendy – Hønefoss – 2012–13
- Laurent Mendy – Sarpsborg 08 – 2021–22
- Mouhamadou Moustapha N'Diaye – Bodø/Glimt – 2014
- **Mame Mor Ndiaye** – **KFUM Oslo** – 2024–
- **Mamour Ndiaye** – **Sarpsborg 08** – 2025–
- **Alioune Ndour** – Haugesund, **Kristiansund** – 2021–22, 2024–
- El Hadj Sega Ngom – Tromsø – 2011
- Mame Niang – Viking, Kongsvinger – 2008–09, 2010
- Oumar Niasse – Brann – 2012
- Sidy Sagna – Sogndal – 2013
- Elhadji Mour Samb – Tromsø – 2017–18
- Vieux Sané – Tromsø, Bodø/Glimt, Brann – 2011, 2014–15, 2021
- Babacar Sarr – Start, Sogndal, Molde – 2013–14, 2014, 2016, 2016–18
- Makhtar Thioune – Molde, Viking – 2009–11, 2012–15
- Ibrahima Wadji – Molde, Haugesund – 2017–18, 2018–21

== Serbia ==
- Stefan Antonijevic – Lillestrøm – 2017–18
- Stevan Bates – Tromsø – 2010
- Stefan Čupić – Sarpsborg 08 – 2017–18
- Dušan Cvetinović – Haugesund – 2013–16
- Đorđe Denić – Rosenborg – 2018–
- Nikola Djurdjic – Haugesund – 2010–11
- Gojko Ivković – Viking – 2008–10
- Petar Golubović – Aalesund – 2022
- Andrej Ilić – Vålerenga – 2023
- Marko Ilić – Sarpsborg 08 – 2024
- Mihajlo Ivančević – Odd – 2024
- **Igor Jeličić** – **Kristiansund** – 2024–
- Milan Jevtović – Bodø/Glimt, Rosenborg, Odd – 2016, 2017, 2021–23
- Nemanja Jovanović – Sandnes Ulf – 2013
- Nikola Komazec – Haugesund – 2014–15
- Aleksandar Kovačević – Haugesund – 2017–18
- Miloš Mihajlov – Sandnes Ulf – 2013
- Branislav Miličević – Start – 2009–10
- Nenad Novaković – Aalesund – 2008
- Zoran Popović – Bodø/Glimt – 2018
- Aleksandar Prijović – Tromsø – 2012–13
- Nenad Srećković – Fredrikstad – 2012
- Nemanja Tubić – Haugesund – 2016
- Srđan Urošević – Ham-Kam – 2008
- Bojan Zajić – Vålerenga, Sarpsborg 08 – 2007–13, 2014–15

== Sierra Leone ==
- Umaru Bangura – Hønefoss, Haugesund – 2010–13
- Alie Conteh – Strømsgodset – 2025
- Khalifa Jabbie – Fredrikstad – 2011–13
- Alfred Sankoh – Strømsgodset – 2006–10, 2010–13

== Slovakia ==
- **Dávid Ďuriš** – **Rosenborg** – 2025–
- Martin Husár – Lillestrøm, HamKam – 2006–09
- Filip Kiss – Haugesund – 2015–17
- Tomáš Malec – Rosenborg, Lillestrøm – 2014–15, 2016–17
- Ivan Mesík – Stabæk, Odd – 2021, 2022
- Josef Miso – Sandefjord – 2006
- **Tomáš Nemčík** – **Rosenborg** – 2024–
- Marek Sapara – Rosenborg – 2006–09
- Michal Tomič – Bodø/Glimt – 2024

== Slovenia ==
- David Brekalo – Viking – 2021–23
- Mitja Brulc – Molde – 2004–05
- Rok Elsner – Haugesund – 2010, 2014
- Robert Koren – Lillestrøm – 2004–06
- Matej Mavrič – Molde – 2004–06
- Denis Selimović – Aalesund – 2007–09
- Jošt Urbančič – Viking FK – 2023–25
- Filip Valenčič – Stabæk – 2018, 2020
- Slobodan Vuk – Tromsø – 2017–18
- Janez Zavrl – Brann – 2006
- Nino Žugelj – Bodø/Glimt – 2022–25

== Somalia ==
- Bilal Njie – Vålerenga, Odd, Haugesund – 2017, 2018–20, 2022–24 2024

== South Africa ==
- Keanin Ayer – Sandefjord – 2022–23
- Emile Baron – Lillestrøm – 1999–2004
- **Samukele Kabini** – **Molde** – 2025–
- Mbulelo Mabizela – Vålerenga – 2005
- Thabang Molefe – Lyn – 2002
- Toni Nhleko – Brann, Viking, Sandefjord – 2002–03, 2005–06, 2007
- MacBeth Sibaya – Rosenborg – 2002
- Lars Veldwijk – Aalesund – 2017

== South Korea ==
- Cha Ji-ho – Lyn – 2004

== Spain ==
- Godwin Antwi – Bodø/Glimt – 2013
- Álvaro Baigorri – Sarpsborg 08 – 2013
- Fernando Blanco – Brann – 1971
- Arnau Casas – Sarpsborg 08 – 2023–24
- Marcos Celorrio – Sandefjord – 2020–21
- José Cruz – Viking – 2017
- Flaco – Molde – 1992–93, 1995
- José Isidoro – Bodø/Glimt – 2018–19
- Adrià Mateo López – Ranheim – 2019
- Rufo – Sandefjord – 2018, 2020, 2022
- Enric Vallès – Sandefjord – 2017–18, 2020–21
- Pau Morer Vicente – Sandefjord – 2015, 2017–18

== Sweden ==
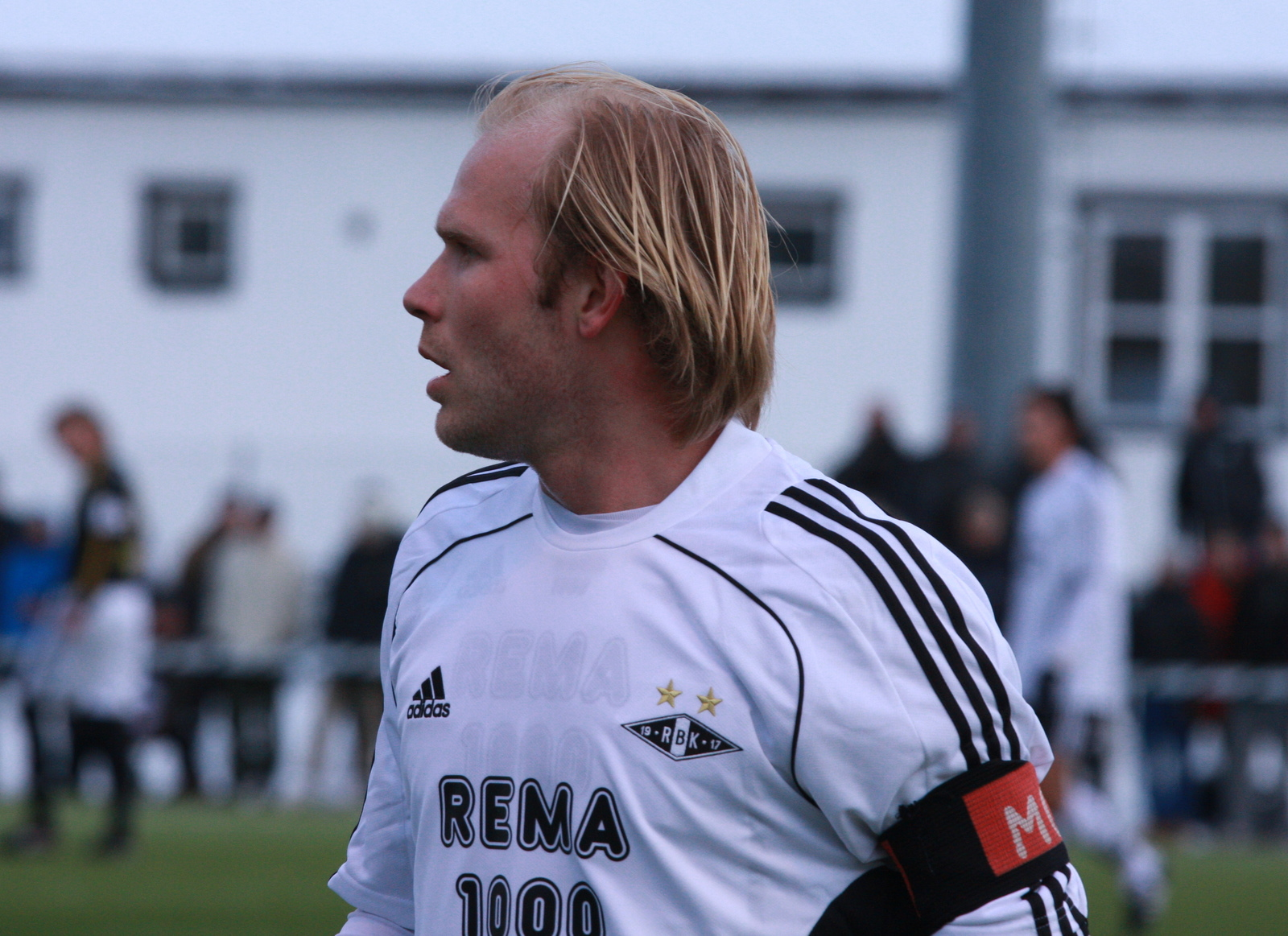
Mikael Dorsin played 270 Eliteserien matches for Rosenborg and won five league titles.

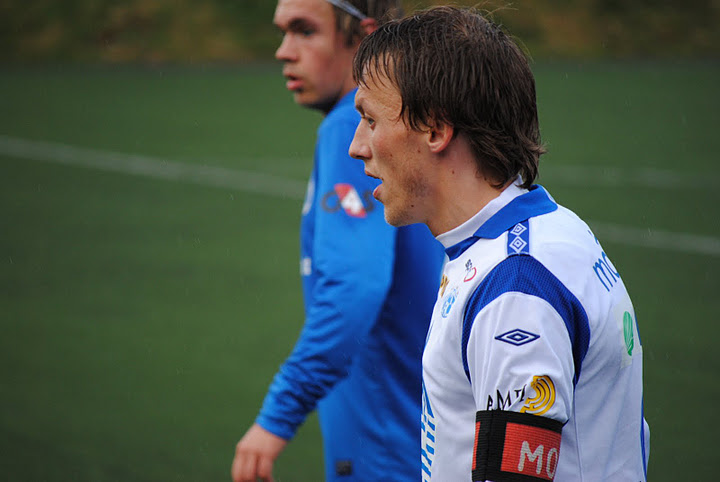
Mattias Moström has played 281 Eliteserien matches for Molde and has won four Eliteserien titles.

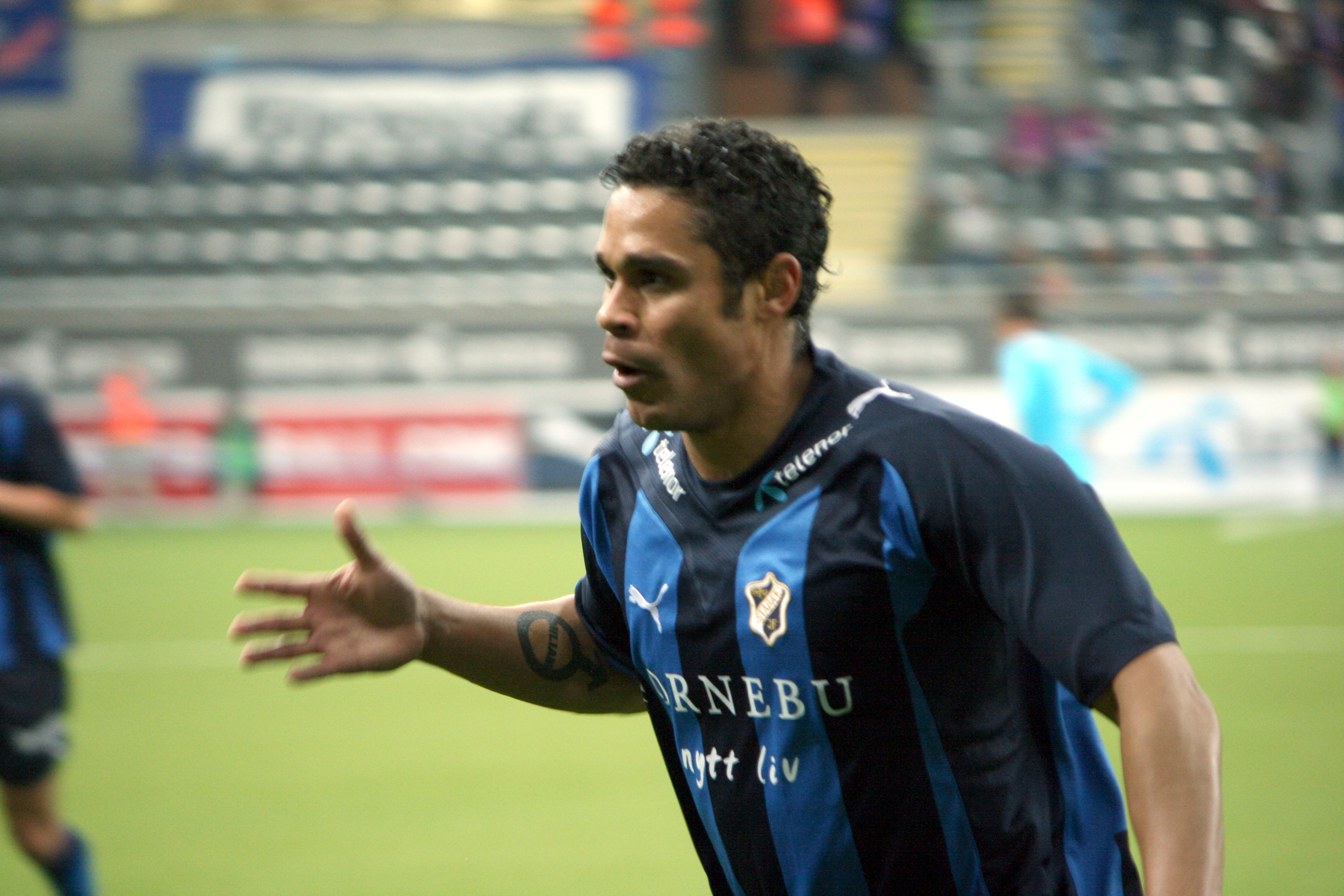
Daniel Nannskog has played 118 top division matches for Stabæk.

- Peter Abelsson – Viking – 2006–08
- Joakim Alexandersson – Aalesund – 2007
- Simon Alexandersson – Kristiansund – 2018
- Jabir Abdihakim Ali – Lillestrøm 2024
- Andreas Alm – Kongsvinger – 1998–99
- John Alvbåge – Stabæk – 2017
- Adam Andersson – Rosenborg – 2021–25
- Björn Andersson – Viking – 2011–12
- Christoffer Andersson – Lillestrøm – 2004–06
- Johan Andersson – Stabæk, Lillestrøm – 2008–11, 2012–15
- Mattias Andersson – Strømsgodset, Fredrikstad, Odd Grenland – 2007–10
- Mikael Andersson – Sandefjord – 2006–07
- Marcus Andreasson – Bryne, Molde – 2001–06, 2008–10
- Filip Apelstav – Kongsvinger, Sogndal – 1999, 2001
- Daniel Arnefjord – Aalesund – 2008–10
- Johan Arneng – Vålerenga, Aalesund – 2002, 2008–10
- Jesper Arvidsson – Vålerenga – 2016
- Mattias Asper – Viking – 2006
- Jeffrey Aubynn – Aalesund – 2006
- Jonathan Augustinsson – Rosenborg – 2021–25
- Andreas Augustsson – Vålerenga – 1999–2000
- Jakob Augustsson – Lyn – 2001–03
- Stefan Bärlin – Start, Odd Grenland – 2005–08
- Joseph Baffo – Vålerenga – 2013
- Abgar Barsom – Fredrikstad – 2008–09
- Hans Berggren – Haugesund – 2000
- Marcus Bergholtz – Stabæk – 2011
- Fredrik Berglund – Stabæk – 2009
- Doug Bergqvist – Haugesund – 2019
- Jacob Bergström – Mjøndalen – 2019
- Valmir Berisha – Aalesund – 2017
- Mattias Bjärsmyr – Rosenborg – 2010–11
- Fredrik Björck – Tromsø – 2010–11
- Carl Björk – Aalesund – 2013–14, 2015
- Joachim Björklund – Brann – 1990–92
- Tim Björkström – Fredrikstad – 2024
- Per Blohm – Viking – 1997–98
- Anders Blomquist – Haugesund – 2000
- Martin Broberg – Odd – 2017–19
- **Anton Cajtoft – Bryne** – 2025
- Ulf Camitz – Strømsgodset – 1991
- Tobias Carlsson – Molde – 2001–03
- Lars-Gunnar Carlstrand – Strømsgodset – 1998
- Paweł Cibicki – Molde – 2018
- Gustaf Crona – Sandefjord – 2006
- Bobbie da Cruz – Kongsvinger – 2010
- Henrik Dahl – Lyn – 2004–06
- Erik Dahlin – Sogndal − 2013–14
- Johan Dahlin – Lyn – 2006–07, 2008–09
- Erdin Demir – Brann – 2012–14
- Panajotis Dimitriadis – Sandefjord – 2010
- Mikael Dorsin – Rosenborg – 2004–07, 2008–16
- **Robin Dzabic** – **Sandefjord** – 2025–
- **David Edvardsson** – **Tromsø** – 2024–
- **Anton Ekeroth** – **HamKam** – 2024–
- Pontus Engblom – Haugesund, Strømsgodset, Sandefjord – 2012–14, 2017–18
- Gustav Engvall – Sarpsborg 08 – 2022
- Ludwig Ernstsson – Kongsvinger – 1997–98
- Kaj Eskelinen – Brann – 1993
- David Fällman – Aalesund – 2022–23
- Pontus Farnerud – Stabæk – 2008–11
- Hampus Finndell – Viking – 2024–25
- Alexander Fransson – Odd – 2024
- Edier Frejd – Kongsvinger, Sandnes Ulf – 2010, 2012–14
- Anders Friberg – Bryne – 2000–01
- Lennart Fridh – Brann – 1991
- Pierre Gallo – Bryne – 2001–03
- Fredrik Gärdeman – Stabæk, Vålerenga, Skeid – 1993–96, 1997–98
- Patrik Gerrbrand – Fredrikstad – 2006–09
- Tobias Grahn – Vålerenga – 2002–03
- **Gustav Granath** – **HamKam** – 2025–
- Fredrik Gustafson – Molde – 2002–03
- Eddie Gustafsson – Molde, Ham-Kam, Lyn – 2002–08
- Kenneth Gustafsson – Lyn – 2001
- Daniel Gustavsson – Lillestrøm – 2019, 2021
- Andreas Haddad – Lillestrøm – 2005–06
- Colo Halit – Lyn – 2004
- Melker Hallberg – Vålerenga – 2015
- Johan Hammarström – Kongsvinger – 1997–98
- Marcus Hansson – Tromsø – 2015
- Patrik Hansson – Brann – 1992–93
- Sebastian Henriksson – Odd Grenland – 2003–05
- Leon Hien – Odd – 2023–24
- Göran Holter – Brann – 1991–92
- Patrik Ingelsten – Viking – 2010, 2012–13
- Stefan Ishizaki – Vålerenga – 2005
- Erik Israelsson – Vålerenga – 2018–19
- Jens Jacobsson – Tromsø – 2016
- **Elias Jemal** – **Sandefjord** – 2024–
- Dime Jankulovski – Start – 2002
- Jesper Jansson – Stabæk – 1997–99, 2006
- Emil Johansson – Molde, Sandnes Ulf – 2010, 2014
- Magnus Johansson – Brann, Haugesund – 1993–98
- Kjell Jonevret – Viking – 1988–90
- Jonas Jonsson – Brann – 2002–03
- Markus Jonsson – Brann – 2012–13
- Kevin Kabran – Start, Viking, Stabæk – 2018, 2020, 2021–22, 2023
- Liridon Kalludra – Sarpsborg 08, Kristiansund – 2015, 2017–22
- Bovar Karim – Tromsø – 2007
- August Karlin – Lillestrøm – 2024
- Markus Karlsson – Stabæk – 2006
- Benjamin Kibebe – Tromsø, Aalesund – 2005–08
- Anders Kiel – Moss – 1998
- Magnus Kihlberg – Lillestrøm, Molde, Aalesund – 1997–2005, 2007
- Magnus Kihlstedt – Lillestrøm, Brann – 1997–2001
- Anton Kralj – Sandefjord – 2020
- Oscar Krusnell – Haugesund – 2023–2025
- William Kurtovic – Sandefjord, HamKam – 2015, 2017–18, 2020–22, 2023– 25
- Andreas Landgren – Fredrikstad – 2011, 2012–14
- Thomas Lagerlöf – Lyn – 2002–04
- Eric Larsson – Lillestrøm – 2024
- Benny Lekström – Tromsø – 2012–13, 2015
- Jonathan Levi – Rosenborg – 2017–18
- Axel Lindahl – Bodø/Glimt – 2021
- Peter Lindau – Strømsgodset – 2001
- Jonas Lindberg – Sarpsborg 08 – 2016–18
- Andreas Linde – Molde – 2015–21
- Rasmus Lindkvist – Vålerenga – 2014–17
- Tobias Linderoth – Stabæk – 1999–2001
- Stefan Lindqvist – Strømsgodset – 1998
- David Ljung – Molde – 2001–04
- Jesper Löfgren – Brann – 2021
- Johnny Lundberg – Sandnes Ulf – 2013
- Robert Lundström – Vålerenga – 2015–18
- Fredric Lundqvist – Viking – 2005–06
- Ramon Pascal Lundqvist – Sarpsborg 08 – 2023
- Mikael Lustig – Rosenborg – 2008–11
- Peter Magnusson – Sandefjord – 2011–12
- Håkan Malmström – Ham-Kam – 2008
- Robin Malmqvist – Tromsø – 2011
- Jerry Månsson – Viking, Moss 1997–2000
- Peter Markstedt – Lyn – 2004
- Christer Mattiasson – Lillestrøm – 2001
- Stefan Mogren – Haugesund – 2000–01
- Guillermo Molins – Sarpsborg 08, Rosenborg – 2020, 2021, 2021–22
- Nikolaj Möller – Strømsgodset – 2024–25
- Albin Mörfelt – Vålerenga – 2021
- Mattias Moström – Molde – 2008–20
- David Myrestam – Haugesund – 2012–17
- Alexander Nadj – Lillestrøm – 2011
- Daniel Nannskog – Stabæk – 2006–10
- Aleksander Damnjanovic Nilsson – Sandefjord – 2022–25
- **Alexander Nilsson** – **HamKam** – 2025–
- Marcus Nilsson – Stabæk – 2016–17
- Per Nilsson – Odd Grenland – 2005–07
- Rikard Nilsson – Lyn – 2009
- Roger Nordstrand – Brann – 1995
- Viktor Noring – Bodø/Glimt – 2013
- Mattias Nylund – Aalesund – 2007
- **Kennedy Okpaleke** – **Fredrikstad** – 2025–
- Kjell Olofsson – Moss – 2000–02
- Peter Olofsson – Bryne – 2000–02
- Jakob Orlov – Brann – 2014, 2016–17
- Daniel Örlund – Fredrikstad, Rosenborg – 2008, 2010–14
- Jakob Olsson – Sandnes Ulf – 2013
- Andreas Ottosson – Tromsø, Start – 1999–2001
- **Filip Ottosson** – **Sandefjord** – 2023–
- Stefan Paldan – Brann – 1997–2000
- Hans Palmquist – Moss – 1997–2001
- Johan Paulsson – Bryne – 2002–03
- Dejan Pavlovic – Bryne – 2001–03
- John Pelu – Rosenborg, Haugesund – 2008–09, 2009–10
- Joakim Persson – Stabæk – 2006
- Isak Pettersson – Stabæk – 2023
- Tom Pettersson – Lillestrøm – 2021–22
- Magnus Powell – Lillestrøm, Lyn – 2000–07
- Rade Prica – Rosenborg – 2009–11
- Anders Prytz – Fredrikstad – 2007
- Joel Riddez – Strømsgodset – 2008–10
- Markus Ringberg – Fredrikstad, Ham-Kam – 2004–06, 2008
- Fredrik Risp – Stabæk – 2009
- Björn Runström – Molde – 2010
- Marcus Sahlman – Tromsø – 2009–11
- Anton Salétros – Sarpsborg 08 – 2020–22
- Magnus Samuelsson – Haugesund – 2000
- Svante Samuelsson – Brann – 1998–2001
- **Marcus Sandberg** – Vålerenga, Stabæk, **HamKam** – 2016–17, 2018–21, 2023–
- Niklas Sandberg – Stabæk – 2008–09
- Pontus Segerström – Stabæk – 2007–09
- Maic Sema – Haugesund – 2012–14
- Dennis Schiller – Lillestrøm, Molde – 1987–99
- Rami Shaaban – Fredrikstad – 2006–07
- Pontus Silfwer – Mjøndalen – 2019
- Moonga Simba – Brann – 2021, 2023–25
- Johan Sjöberg – Fredrikstad – 2007
- Joakim Sjöhage – Brann – 2007
- Pascal Simpson – Vålerenga – 1998–2000
- Christian Rubio Sivodedov – Strømsgodset – 2017–18
- **Zinedin Smajlović** – **Sandefjord** – 2025–
- Tom Söderberg – Sogndal – 2014
- Ole Söderberg – Molde – 2012–13
- Håkan Söderstjerna – Fredrikstad – 2004
- Isak Ssewankambo – Molde – 2016–18
- Fredrik Stoor – Rosenborg, Vålerenga, Lillestrøm – 2007–08, 2011–14
- Glenn Ståhl – HamKam – 2001–05
- Magnus Svensson – Viking – 1998–99
- Niclas Svensson – Stabæk – 1998–99
- Arash Talebinejad – Tromsø – 2006
- Jimmy Tamandi – Lyn – 2008–09
- Andreas Tegström – Sandefjord, Fredrikstad – 2006–08
- Christopher Telo – Molde – 2017–19
- Daniel Theorin – Lyn – 2005–06
- Simon Tibbling – Sarpsborg 08 – 2022–25
- Darrell Tibell – Sandefjord – 2024–25
- Pavle Vagić – Rosenborg – 2021–22
- Stefano Vecchia – Rosenborg – 2021–22
- Leopold Wahlstedt – Odd – 2021–23
- Olof Hvidén-Watson – Odd, – 2006–07
- Jörgen Wålemark – Lillestrøm – 1997
- **Alexander Warneryd** – **Trosmø** – 2025–
- Victor Wernersson – Stabæk – 2021
- Jesper Westerberg – Lillestrøm – 2012
- Rasmus Wiedesheim-Paul – Rosenborg, HamKam – 2020–23, 2023
- Christian Wilhelmsson – Stabæk – 2000–03
- Albin Winbo – Sandefjord – 2022
- Jonas Wirmola – Skeid – 1997
- Samuel Wowoah – Stabæk – 2004

== Switzerland ==
- **Loris Mettler** – **Sandefjord** – 2024–

== Syria ==
- Simon Amin – Sandefjord – 2023–25
- **Elias Hadaya** – **Sandefjord** – 2025–
- George Mourad – Tromsø – 2010

== Tanzania ==
- Henry Shindika – Kongsvinger – 2010

== Thailand ==
- Nicholas Mickelson – Strømsgodset – 2019–21

== Togo ==
- Komlan Amewou – Strømsgodset – 2008–10
- Lalawélé Atakora – Fredrikstad – 2009–11

== Trinidad and Tobago ==
- Sheldon Bateau – Sarpsborg – 2019

== Tunisia ==
- Karim Essediri – Tromsø, Bodø/Glimt, Rosenborg, Lillestrøm – 2001–11
- Issam Jebali – Rosenborg – 2018
- Amor Layouni – Bodø/Glimt, Vålerenga – 2017–19, 2021–22
- Khaled Mouelhi – Lillestrøm – 2005–10
- Sofien Moussa – Tromsø – 2016
- Sebastian Tounekti – Bodø/Glimt, Haugesund – 2020–22, 2022–25

== Turkey ==
- Hasan Kuruçay – HamKam – 2022
- **Aksel Baran Potur** – **HamKam** – 2025–
- Aral Şimşir – Jerv, Lillestrøm – 2022, 2022

== Uganda ==
- Tony Mawejje – Haugesund – 2014

== Ukraine ==
- Ruslan Babenko – Bodø/Glimt – 2016
- Oleksiy Khoblenko – Stabæk – 2021
- Serhiy Pohorilyi – Bodø/Glimt – 2016
- Yuriy Yakovenko – HamKam – 2022

== United States ==
- Chad Barrett – Vålerenga – 2012
- Wade Barrett – Fredrikstad – 2004
- Joseph Bendik – Sogndal – 2011
- Rhett Bernstein – Mjøndalen – 2015
- Nat Borchers – Odd Grenland – 2006–07
- Jeb Brovsky – Strømsgodset – 2014
- Adin Brown – Aalesund – 2005, 2007–08
- **Christian Cappis** – Molde, **Viking** – 2023, 2024–
- Ricardo Clark – Stabæk – 2012
- Steve Clark – Hønefoss – 2010
- Ramiro Corrales – Ham-Kam, Brann – 2005–07
- Sean Cunningham – Stabæk – 2012
- Danny Cruz – Bodø/Glimt – 2015
- Alex DeJohn – Start – 2015–16
- Mix Diskerud – Stabæk, Rosenborg – 2009–11, 2012–14
- Hunter Freeman – Start – 2009–10
- Romain Gall – Stabæk – 2020
- Joshua Gatt – Molde – 2011–13, 2015–16
- Clarence Goodson – Start – 2009–10
- Orest Grechka – Moss – 2001
- Cole Grossman – Stabæk – 2015–16
- Kobe Hernandez-Foster – HamKam – 2022–23
- **Ian Hoffmann** – **Kristiansund** – 2025–
- Ethan Horvath – Molde – 2015–16
- Alex Horwath – Brann – 2016–17
- Erik Hurtado – Mjøndalen – 2015
- Andrew Jacobson – Stabæk – 2014
- Lagos Kunga – Kristiansund – 2021
- Tyrel Lacey – Lyn – 2009
- **Michael Lansing** – Aalesund, **Kristiansund** – 2023, 2024–
- Pat Noonan – Aalesund – 2008
- Troy Perkins – Vålerenga – 2008–09
- Sam Rogers – Rosenborg, Lillestrøm, HamKam – 2022–23, 2023–25, 2024
- Rubio Rubin – Stabæk – 2017
- Robbie Russell – Sogndal, Rosenborg – 2002–04, 2004–05
- Adam Saldana – KFUM Oslo – 2024–25
- Adam Skumawitz – Aalesund – 2003
- A. J. Soares – Viking – 2015–16
- Ben Spencer – Molde – 2013
- Michael Stephens – Stabæk – 2014
- Paul Torres – Sandnes – 2015
- Brian Waltrip – Sandefjord, Molde – 2006, 2008
- Brian West – Fredrikstad – 2004–09
- Quentin Westberg – Sarpsborg 08 – 2015
- Henry Wingo – Molde – 2019–20

== Uruguay ==
- Maximiliano Bajter – Brann – 2011
- Felipe Carvalho – Vålerenga – 2018–21
- Sebastián Eguren – Rosenborg – 2005
- Carlos Grossmüller – Sandefjord – 2017
- Diego Guastavino – Lyn, Brann – 2008–11
- Alejandro Lago – Rosenborg – 2005, 2007–11
- Nicolás Mezquida – Brann, Lillestrøm – 2011
- Facundo Rodríguez – Sandefjord – 2017

== Venezuela ==
- Fernando de Ornelas – Odd Grenland – 2005–08
- Juan Fuenmayor – Vålerenga – 2009
- Ronald Hernández – Stabæk – 2017–19

== Wales ==
- Michael Crowe – Viking – 2020
- Chris Dawson – Viking – 2016–17
- Kieffer Moore – Viking – 2015
- Ryan Nicholls – Strømsgodset – 1994
- Josh Pritchard – Tromsø – 2013
- Rhys Weston – Viking – 2006

== Zimbabwe ==
- Matthew Rusike – Stabæk – 2019

== Notes ==
1. Born in Belgium
2. Born in Bosnia and Herzegovina (then part of Yugoslavia)
3. Born in Burkina Faso
4. Born in Cameroon
5. Born in Canada
6. Born in Colombia
7. Born in Croatia (then part of Yugoslavia)
8. Born in Denmark
9. Born in England
10. Born in Ethiopia
11. Born in Finland
12. Born in France
13. Born in Germany
14. Born in West Germany (now part of Germany)
15. Born in Ghana
16. Born in Greece
17. Born in Israel
18. Born in the Ivory Coast
19. Born in Kosovo (then part of Yugoslavia)
20. Born in Lebanon
21. Born in Malawi
22. Born in Morocco
23. Born in the Netherlands
24. Born in North Macedonia
25. Born in Norway
26. Born in Poland
27. Born in Portugal
28. Born in Republic of Ireland
29. Born in Russia
30. Born in South Africa
31. Born in Spain
32. Born in Switzerland
33. Born in Sweden
34. Born in Togo
35. Born in Uganda
36. Born in Ukraine (then part of the Soviet Union)
37. Born in the United States
38. Born in Uruguay
39. Born in Venezuela
40. Capped for the Albania national football team
41. Capped for the Canada national under-20 football team
42. Capped for the Denmark national under-19 football team
43. Capped for the Denmark national under-21 football team
44. Capped for the Finland national football team
45. Capped for the France national under-21 football team
46. Capped for the Ivory Coast national under-20 football team
47. Capped for the Kosovo national under-21 football team
48. Capped for the New Zealand national under-23 football team
49. Capped for the Norway national under-17 football team
50. Capped for the Norway national under-19 football team
51. Capped for the Norway national under-20 football team
52. Capped for the Norway national under-21 football team
53. Capped for the Norway national football team
54. Capped for the Poland national under-20 football team
55. Capped for the Portugal national under-21 football team
56. Capped for the Republic of Ireland national under-16 football team
57. Capped for the Republic of Ireland national under-21 football team
58. Capped for the Sweden men's national football team
59. Capped for the Sweden men's national under-17 football team
60. Capped for the Sweden men's national under-19 football team
61. Capped for the Sweden national under-21 football team
62. Capped for the Switzerland national under-21 football team
