= Ndikumana =

Ndikumana is an African surname, and may refer to:

- Janvier Ndikumana, Burundian footballer
- Hamad Ndikumana, Rwandan footballer
- Madjidi Ndikumana, Burundian footballer
- Saidi Ndikumana, Burundian footballer
- Selemani Ndikumana, Burundian footballer
- Trésor Ndikumana (born 1998), Burundian footballer
- Chris Ndikumana, a Burundian evangelist
