= Mogren =

Mogren is a surname. Notable people with the surname include:

- Abdullah Al-Mogren (born 1996), Saudi Arabian professional footballer
- Joakim Mogren, fictional character
- Mikael Mogren (born 1969), Swedish bishop, theologian, and author
- Stefan Mogren (born 1968), Swedish footballer
- Torgny Mogren (born 1963), Swedish cross-country skier

== See also ==
- Moren
