= Henrik Dahl =

Henrik Dahl may refer to:

- Henrik Dahl (footballer)
- Henrik Dahl (politician)
