= Linus Carlstrand =

Swedish footballer

- Carlstrand with Östers IF in 2026

Personal information
- Full name: Linus Casper Carlstrand
- Date of birth: 31 August 2004 (age 22)
- Place of birth: Gothenburg, Sweden
- Height: 1.84 m (6 ft 0 in)
- Position: Striker

Team information
- Current team: AIK
- Number: 9

Youth career
- Lerkils IF
- –2018: GAIS
- 2018–2022: IFK Göteborg

Senior career*
Years	Team	Apps	(Gls)
2022–2025	IFK Göteborg	51	(1)
2023	→ Utsiktens BK (loan)	6	(1)
2024	→ Västra Frölunda IF (loan)	12	(9)
2025	→ Ljungskile SK (loan)	10	(12)
2026	Östers IF	15	(10)
2026–	AIK	2	(4)

International career^{‡}
2022–2024	Sweden U19	3	(1)
- * Club domestic league appearances and goals as of 21:15, 2 August 2026 (UTC) ‡ National team caps and goals as of 21:40, 14 September 2024 (UTC)

Linus Casper Carlstrand (born 31 August 2004) is a Swedish footballer who plays as a striker for AIK. He is the son of former footballer Lars-Gunnar Carlstrand.
