= Diego de la Vega (disambiguation) =

Diego de la Vega is the real name of Zorro.

Diego de la Vega may also refer to:

- Diego de la Vega (footballer) (born 1979), Argentine footballer
- Diego López de la Vega (1591–1659), Roman Catholic prelate
