= Dennis Schiller =

Swedish footballer

Personal information
- Full name: Dennis Schiller
- Date of birth: 18 May 1965 (age 61)
- Place of birth: Gothenburg, Sweden
- Height: 1.80 m (5 ft 11 in)
- Position: Defender

Senior career*
Years	Team	Apps	(Gls)
1984–1986	IFK Göteborg	6	(0)
1987–1996	Lillestrøm SK	207	(8)
1997–1999	Molde FK	38	(2)

International career
1988–1992	Sweden	14	(1)
- * Club domestic league appearances and goals

Dennis Schiller (born 18 May 1965 in Gothenburg) is a Swedish retired footballer who played as a right defender.

== Football career ==
During his entire career, Schiller played for his hometown club IFK Göteborg, Norwegian Lillestrøm SK (where he stayed for almost ten years helping the side to win the Norwegian league in 1989) and finally Molde FK.

He gained 14 caps for the Sweden national team scoring one goal. Schiller participated in two qualifying matches for the 1990 World Cup (against England and Poland), however he did not represent the nation at any international championship and his last appearance was on 26 January 1992 against Australia, in a 0–0 away draw.

== Personal ==
His older brother Glenn Schiller was also a footballer who came to win the 1982 UEFA Cup.

== See also ==
- List of foreign Norwegian Premier League players
- 1989 in Swedish football
- Norwegian Football Cup 1992
