= 1989 in Swedish football =

The 1989 season in Swedish football, starting January 1989 and ending December 1989:

== Honours ==
=== Official titles ===
Title	Team	Reason
Swedish Champions 1989	IFK Norrköping	Winners of Allsvenskan play-off
Swedish Cup Champions 1988–89	Malmö FF	Winners of Svenska Cupen

=== Competitions ===
Level	Competition	Team
1st level	Allsvenskan 1989	Malmö FF
1st level	Allsvenskan play-off 1989	IFK Norrköping
2nd level	Division 1 Norra 1989	Hammarby IF
2nd level	Division 1 Södra 1989	Östers IF
Cup	Svenska Cupen 1988–89	Malmö FF

== Promotions, relegations and qualifications ==
=== Promotions ===
Promoted from	Promoted to	Team	Reason
Division 1 Norra 1989	Allsvenskan 1990	Hammarby IF	Winners
Division 1 Södra 1989	Allsvenskan 1990	Östers IF	Winners
Division 2 1989	Division 1 Norra 1990	Spårvägens GoIF	Winners of Norra
Division 2 1989	Division 1 Norra 1990	Tyresö FF	Winners of Östra
Division 2 1989	Division 1 Södra 1990	Gunnilse IS	Winners of Västra
Division 2 1989	Division 1 Södra 1990	Helsingborgs IF	Winners of Södra

=== Relegations ===
Relegated from	Relegated to	Team	Reason
Allsvenskan 1989	Division 1 Norra 1990	GIF Sundsvall	11th team
Allsvenskan 1989	Division 1 Södra 1990	Västra Frölunda IF	12th team
Division 1 Norra 1989	Division 2 1990	Åtvidabergs FF	13th team
Division 1 Norra 1989	Division 2 1990	Karlstad BK	14th team
Division 1 Södra 1989	Division 2 1990	Ifö/Bromölla IF	13th team
Division 1 Södra 1989	Division 2 1990	Falkenbergs FF	14th team

=== International qualifications ===
Qualified for	Enters	Team	Reason
European Cup 1990–91	1st round	Malmö FF	Winners of Allsvenskan
UEFA Cup 1990–91	1st round	IFK Göteborg	2nd team in Allsvenskan
UEFA Cup 1990–91	1st round	Örgryte IS	3rd team in Allsvenskan
UEFA Cup Winners' Cup 1989–90	1st round	Djurgårdens IF	Runners-up of Svenska Cupen
International Football Cup 1990	Group stage	Malmö FF	Winners of Allsvenskan
International Football Cup 1990	Group stage	IFK Norrköping	2nd team in Allsvenskan
International Football Cup 1990	Group stage	GAIS	3rd team in Allsvenskan
International Football Cup 1990	Group stage	Örebro SK	4th team in Allsvenskan
International Football Cup 1990	Group stage	Gefle IF	Unknown

== Domestic results ==
=== Allsvenskan 1989 ===
	Team	Pld	W	D	L	GF		GA	GD	Pts
1	Malmö FF	22	12	7	3	35	–	11	+24	31
2	IFK Norrköping	22	12	5	5	45	–	24	+21	29
3	GAIS	22	9	8	5	31	–	20	+11	26
4	Örebro SK	22	10	6	6	25	–	21	+4	26
5	Halmstads BK	22	11	3	8	30	–	31	-1	25
6	Djurgårdens IF	22	9	5	8	23	–	24	-1	23
7	IFK Göteborg	22	9	4	9	34	–	29	+5	22
8	AIK	22	5	11	6	26	–	29	-3	21
9	Örgryte IS	22	6	9	7	19	–	28	-9	21
10	IK Brage	22	6	5	11	22	–	31	-9	17
11	GIF Sundsvall	22	4	5	13	30	–	40	-10	13
12	Västra Frölunda IF	22	3	4	15	24	–	56	-32	10

=== Allsvenskan play-off 1989 ===
Semi-finals

October 14, 1989

GAIS	2–2	Malmö FF

?, ?
October 28, 1989

Malmö FF	1–0	GAIS

?, ?

October 14, 1989

Örebro SK	1–1	IFK Norrköping

?, ?
October 29, 1989

IFK Norrköping	3–0	Örebro SK

?, ?

Final

November 4, 1989

IFK Norrköping	0–2	Malmö FF

Idrottsparken, Norrköping
November 11, 1989

Malmö FF	0–1	IFK Norrköping

Malmö Stadion, Malmö
November 15, 1989

Malmö FF	0–0 0–0 (aet) 3–4 (apen)	IFK Norrköping

Malmö Stadion, Malmö

=== Division 1 Norra 1989 ===
	Team	Pld	W	D	L	GF		GA	GD	Pts
1	Hammarby IF	26	16	4	6	49	–	24	+25	36
2	Vasalunds IF	26	15	6	5	43	–	18	+25	36
3	Kiruna FF	26	13	8	5	43	–	25	+18	34
4	BK Forward	26	13	5	8	36	–	27	+9	31
5	Motala AIF	26	12	6	8	38	–	27	+11	30
6	Luleå FF/IFK	26	11	8	7	30	–	27	+3	30
7	Västerås SK	26	10	9	7	31	–	29	+2	29
8	Gefle IF	26	10	6	10	36	–	29	+7	26
9	IFK Eskilstuna	26	10	4	12	31	–	25	+6	24
10	IF Brommapojkarna	26	8	8	10	29	–	35	-6	24
11	Väsby IK	26	8	7	11	30	–	35	-5	23
12	IFK Holmsund	26	7	4	15	24	–	50	-26	18
13	Åtvidabergs FF	26	4	9	13	27	–	43	-16	17
14	Karlstad BK	26	2	2	22	13	–	59	-46	6

=== Division 1 Södra 1989 ===
	Team	Pld	W	D	L	GF		GA	GD	Pts
1	Östers IF	26	17	9	0	69	–	20	+49	43
2	Trelleborgs FF	26	11	10	5	52	–	38	+14	32
3	IF Elfsborg	26	10	12	4	46	–	33	+13	32
4	IK Oddevold	26	11	9	6	53	–	58	-5	31
5	Kalmar FF	26	10	7	9	40	–	35	+5	27
6	Mjällby AIF	26	10	7	9	36	–	34	+2	27
7	BK Häcken	26	9	8	9	45	–	38	+7	26
8	Landskrona BoIS	26	7	8	11	35	–	43	-8	22
9	Markaryds IF	26	8	6	12	28	–	38	-10	22
10	Jonsereds IF	26	9	4	13	36	–	49	-13	22
11	Karlskrona AIF	26	8	6	12	34	–	53	-19	22
12	Kalmar AIK	26	8	5	13	36	–	42	-6	21
13	Ifö/Bromölla IF	26	6	9	11	21	–	43	-22	21
14	Falkenbergs FF	26	4	8	14	35	–	62	-27	16

=== Svenska Cupen 1988–89 ===
Final

June 29, 1989

Malmö FF	3–0	Djurgårdens IF

Råsunda, Solna

== National team results ==
April 26, 1989
Friendly
№ 649

Wales	0–2	Sweden
		Schiller 30'; Ratcliffe 57' (og)

Racecourse Ground, Wrexham
Attendance: 7,292
Referee: Purcell (Ireland)

May 7, 1989
1990 World Cup qualification
№ 650

Sweden	2–1	Poland
Ljung 76'; Larsson 90'		Tarasiewicz 86'

Råsunda, Solna
Attendance: 35,032
Referee: Röthlisberger (Switzerland)

May 31, 1989
Friendly
№ 651

Sweden	2–0	Algeria
Ingesson 33', 74'

Eyravallen, Örebro
Attendance: 7,501
Referee: Nielsen (Denmark)

June 14, 1989
Anniversary Tournament
№ 652

Denmark	6–0	Sweden
Povlsen 30', 70'; Elstrup 42', 73'; Andersen 64'; Laudrup 80'

Idrætsparken, Copenhagen
Attendance: 15,200
Referee: Pauly (West Germany)

June 16, 1989
Anniversary Tournament
№ 653

Sweden	2–1	Brazil
Rehn 26'; Ljung 49' (p)		Cristóvão 79'

Idrætsparken, Copenhagen
Attendance: 6,700
Referee: Lund-Sørensen (Denmark)

August 16, 1989
Friendly
№ 654

Sweden	2–4	France
Thern 5'; Lindqvist 63'		Cantona 57', 86'; Papin 61', 83'

Malmö Stadion, Malmö
Attendance: 16,619
Referee: Shainer (Israel)

September 6, 1989
1990 World Cup qualification
№ 655

Sweden	0–0	England

Råsunda, Solna
Attendance: 38,588
Referee: Forstinger (Austria)

October 8, 1989
1990 World Cup qualification
№ 656

Sweden	3–1	Albania
Magnusson 19'; Ingesson 54'; Engqvist 90'		Kushta 8' (p)

Råsunda, Solna
Attendance: 32,423
Referee: da Silva Santos (Portugal)

October 25, 1989
1990 World Cup qualification
№ 657

Poland	0–2	Sweden
		Larsson 34' (p); Ekström 60'

Stadion Śląski, Chorzów
Attendance: 15,000
Referee: Ziller (East Germany)
