= Trésor Ndikumana =

Burundian footballer

Personal information
- Date of birth: 25 April 1998 (age 28)
- Place of birth: Ngagara, Burundi
- Height: 1.75 m (5 ft 9 in)
- Position: Midfielder

Senior career*
Years	Team	Apps	(Gls)
2015–2017	LLB Académic FC		
2017–2019	Amagaju Nyamagabe		
2019	Leopards		
2019–2021	Gasogi United		
2021–2023	Espoir Rusizi		
2023–2024	Bumamuru		

International career
2017–2018	Burundi	9	(2)
- * Club domestic league appearances and goals

Trésor Ndikumana (born 25 April 1998) is a Burundian international footballer who plays as a midfielder.

== Club career ==
Having played for Lydia Ludic Burundi Académic and Amagaju Nyamagabe in his native Burundi, Ndikumana moved to Kenya in July 2019, signing with AFC Leopards. However, after just four months with the club, it was reported that Ndikumana and teammate Vincent Abamahoro had requested to leave the club, and had refused to attend training. In December 2019, he left the club, returning to Burundi to join Gasogi United, with Leopards later banned from registering players after failing to pay players, including Ndikumana. He later went on to captain Rwandan club Espoir Rusizi.

== International career ==
Ndikumana made his senior international debut in a 7–0 friendly victory over Djibouti, scoring two goals.

== International statistics ==
National team	Year	Apps	Goals
Burundi	2017	8	2
Burundi	2018	1	0
Total		9	2

=== International goals ===
Scores and results list Burundi's goal tally first, score column indicates score after each Ndikumana goal.

List of international goals scored by Trésor Ndikumana
No.	Date	Venue	Opponent	Score	Result	Competition
1	11 March 2017	Prince Louis Rwagasore Stadium, Bujumbura, Burundi	Djibouti	3–0	7–0	Friendly
2	11 March 2017	Prince Louis Rwagasore Stadium, Bujumbura, Burundi	Djibouti	7–0	7–0	Friendly
