= Hans Palmquist =

Swedish footballer

Hans Palmquist (born 26 December 1967) is a Swedish retired football defender.

He played for IFK Göteborg and BK Häcken before joining Norwegian team Moss FK ahead of the 1997 season. The team won promotion, and Palmquist played on the top Norwegian tier in 1998, 1999 and 2000. In 2001 and 2002 he was injured in the knee and did not play.
