= Anders Kiel =

Swedish footballer (born 1964)

Personal information
- Born: 5 January 1964 (age 62)

Sport
- Country: Sweden
- Sport: football
- Position: striker
- Team: Moss FK

Anders Kiel (born 5 January 1964) is a Swedish retired football striker.

He played for BK Häcken and GAIS before joining Norwegian team Moss FK ahead of the 1997 season. The team won promotion, and Kiel played on the top Norwegian tier in 1998. He retired ahead of the 1999 season.
