= Adam Skumawitz =

American soccer player, coach, and businessman

Personal information
- Full name: Adam King Skumawitz
- Date of birth: February 1979 (age 47)
- Place of birth: Newport Beach, CA
- Height: 6 ft 3 in (1.91 m)
- Positions: Midfielder; forward

Youth career
- 1994–1997: Fallbrook Union High School
- 1994–1997: San Diego Surf
- 1999–2001: Olympic Development Program National Pool

College career
Years	Team	Apps	(Gls)
1997–2001	Cornell University	67	(20)

Senior career*
Years	Team	Apps	(Gls)
2001	Boston Bulldogs	9	(5)
2001–2003	FC Grün-Weiß Wolfen	42	(25)
2003–2005	Aalesunds FK	9	(1)

Managerial career
- 2005–2006: Temecula Valley High School Girls Varsity
- 2011–2014: Great Oak High School Boys Varsity
- 2011–2015: Carlsbad Elite - College Liaison
- 2015–2018: Murrieta Surf - Director of Coaching Girls
- * Club domestic league appearances and goals

Adam Skumawitz (born 1979) is an American businessman, soccer coach, and former professional player who played for Aalesunds FK in the Eliteserien in 2003.

== Career ==
Skumawitz currently lives in southern California and is the Vice President of Anselmo Investment Management . He is the founder of Football Proper soccer training academy and was elected to serve on the Temecula Valley Unified School District Governing Board in 2018.

=== College ===
Skumawitz was born in Newport Beach, CA, and played college soccer at Cornell University from 1997 to 2001 and decided he would play internationally in Germany and Norway. He is the all-time leader in Cornell Men's Soccer history for games played (67) and games started (64) and was the team's leading scorer in 2000.

=== Professional ===
Skumawitz turned professional in 2001 and spent one season with the Boston Bulldogs before joining FC Gruen-Weiss Wolfen and finishing his playing career in the Norwegian Premier League with Aalesunds FK.

== Norway ==
Coming from the German professional team Gruen-Weiss Wolfen to Aalesunds of the Norwegian Premier League in summer 2003, Skumawitz was viewed as the club's savior from relegation by their fans, able to be used in midfield or attack. However, even though he scored the second goal to beat Lyn 2–0 on his debut, The American's professional career was truncated by a back injury.

=== International ===
Although Skumawitz never earned a cap for the United States national team, he participated in the Olympic Development Program throughout his youth soccer playing on the California State and Region IV select teams.

=== Coaching ===
Skumawitz began coaching immediately after he finished playing overseas and coached for 15 years before retiring from the field in 2015. His first position was as the Varsity Head Coach for the Temecula Valley Girls High School team, winning a CIF (California) State championship and completing an undefeated season in his second year in charge. In club soccer, Skumawitz served as the College Liaison and Girls Head Coach for Carlsbad Elite (now named LA Galaxy San Diego) and led his team to a US Youth National Championship and number one national youth ranking.
