= Dave Macciochi =

English footballer (born 1972)

Personal information
- Full name: David Andrew Macciochi
- Date of birth: 14 January 1972
- Place of birth: Harlow, England
- Position: Winger

Youth career
- Leyton Orient
- 198?–1990: Queens Park Rangers

Senior career*
Years	Team	Apps	(Gls)
1990–1992	Queens Park Rangers	0	(0)
1991	→ Sogndal (loan)	15	(1)
1992–1993	Brighton & Hove Albion	2	(0)
1993	Kingstonian		
1993	Dulwich Hamlet		
1993	Whyteleafe		
1993–1994	Bishops Stortford		
1994–199?	Sawbridgeworth Town		
- Takeley
- * Club domestic league appearances and goals

David Andrew Macciochi (born 14 January 1972) is an English former professional footballer who played as a winger in the Football League for Brighton & Hove Albion and in the Tippeligaen for Sogndal. He began his career as a trainee with Queens Park Rangers, but never played for their league side.

== Career ==
Macciochi was born in 1972 in Harlow, Essex, and represented Harlow Schools. He spent time at Leyton Orient's Centre of Excellence before joining First Division club Queens Park Rangers as a trainee. He turned professional in 1990, and the following year, signed on loan at Norwegian club Sogndal, for which he made 15 appearances in the 1991 Tippeligaen and scored once, in a 4–2 loss to Viking. Macciochi played reserve-team football for QPR, and scored against Arsenal's reserves in a match that made the back pages of the tabloids when four players, including Arsenal's David O'Leary were sent off, but never appeared for the first team, and was released at the end of the 1991–92 season.

He joined Brighton & Hove Albion in September 1992 on non-contract terms and made two substitute appearances in the Second Division (third tier) before being released. He spent short spells with Kingstonian, Dulwich Hamlet and Whyteleafe before staying with Bishop's Stortford long enough to help them win the 1993–94 Isthmian League Division One title, and then played lower down the non-league ladder for Essex clubs Sawbridgeworth Town and Takeley.
