= Orest Grechka =

Ukrainian-American soccer player

Personal information
- Date of birth: December 20, 1975 (age 50)
- Place of birth: Ukrainian SSR, Soviet Union (now Ukraine)
- Position: Forward

College career
Years	Team	Apps	(Gls)
1995–1998	Hartwick College		

Senior career*
Years	Team	Apps	(Gls)
–2000	Hannover 96 II		
2000–2001	Moss FK	7	(0)
- * Club domestic league appearances and goals

Orest Grechka (Note: Ukrainian: Орест Гречка, romanized: Orest Hrechka) (born December 20, 1975) is a Ukrainian-American former soccer player who is also known to have played for Moss FK of the Norwegian Premier League from 2000 to 2001.

== Norway ==
He went to Norway after playing for Hannover 96 II in Germany. Completing a two-year deal with Norway's Moss FK in 2000, Grechka was the first of their new imports to arrive, debuting on the 81st minute in a 1–0 defeat to Brann. However, on account of pulling a hamstring muscle shortly after, the forward was left out for 4–6 weeks if his condition retrogressed, eventually cancelling his contract in August 2001.
