= Timo Pirilä =

Finnish footballer (born 1967)

Personal information
- Date of birth: 17 April 1967 (age 59)
- Place of birth: Finland
- Position: Midfielder

Youth career
- KePS

Senior career*
Years	Team	Apps	(Gls)
1986–1988	KePS		(4)
1989	Mjølner	20	(0)
1990	OTP	16	(1)
1992–1993	KePS		(1)
1994–1996	RoPS	23	(0)
- * Club domestic league appearances and goals

Timo Pirilä (born 17 April 1967) is a Finnish former professional footballer who played as a midfielder.

== Career ==
Pirilä was raised in Kemi and started football in local club Kemin Palloseura. He played for KePS in former top-tier Mestaruussarja. During his career he made 39 appearances in Finnish current top-tier Veikkausliiga for OTP and RoPS and 20 appearances in Norwegian top-tier Tippeligaen for Mjølner.

Later Pirilä has worked as a teacher in Haukipudas, Oulu.
