= Madjidi Ndikumana =

Burundian footballer

Personal information
- Date of birth: February 8, 1976 (age 50)
- Place of birth: Bujumbura, Burundi
- Position: Defender

Team information
- Current team: Light Stars FC

Senior career*
Years	Team	Apps	(Gls)
2000–2002	Rayon Sport		
2002–2005	Prince Louis FC		
2005–	Light Stars FC		

International career^{‡}
1998–2003	Burundi	27	(0)
- * Club domestic league appearances and goals as of 9 November 2007 ‡ National team caps and goals as of 9 November 2007

Madjidi Ndikumana (born 8 February 1976 in Bujumbura) is a Burundian defender who played with Light Stars FC in the Seychelles League.

== Career ==
He signs in January 2005 with Light Stars FC, he was transferred from Prince Louis FC, formerly presented Rayon Sport. He presented his homeland on international level from 1998 between 2003.
