= Lars-Gunnar Carlstrand =

Swedish footballer

Personal information
- Date of birth: August 29, 1973 (age 53)
- Place of birth: Gothenburg, Sweden
- Height: 1.81 m (5 ft 11 1/2 in)
- Positions: Attacking midfielder; striker

Senior career*
| Years | Team | Apps | (Gls) |
| 1997 | Västra Frölunda IF | | |
| 1998 | Leicester City | 0 | (0) |
| 1998–1999 | Strømsgodset IF | - | (-) |
| 1999–2001 | IF Elfsborg | - | (-) |
| 2002–2003 | Västra Frölunda IF | - | (-) |
| 2003–2004 | GAIS | - | (-) |

International career
- Sweden U21
- * Club domestic league appearances and goals

Lars-Gunnar Carlstrand (born 29 August 1973) is a Swedish football attacking midfielder and striker.

== Career ==
Carlstrand began his career at Västra Frölunda IF, as a trialist for St Johnstone but turned down a contract offer in December 1997 because he couldn't bring his dog to Scotland. He spent the early months of 1998 with Leicester City. Scoring in each of his first two Central League games, he was sent off in the third. His eventful spell at the Foxes was terminated after a five-game, four goal reserve record; a near breakthrough at Ewood Park when the final whistle frustrated Martin O'Neill's attempt to introduce him as a late substitute; and a training ground broken nose. He then signed for Norwegian side Strømsgodset IF and returned to Sweden in 1999 to join IF Elfsborg, earning a domestic Cup Winners' Cup medal with the team in 2001. In March 2002, he rejoined Västra Frölunda IF and for 2003/04, he represented GAIS, the Gothenburg club where his father Gunnar had been a player in the early 1950s. He then briefly trained with Utsiktens BK before retiring from football.
