= Janvier Ndikumana =

Burundian footballer

Personal information
- Full name: Janvier Omar Ndikumana
- Date of birth: 17 February 1983 (age 43)
- Place of birth: Burundi
- Height: 1.77 m (5 ft 10 in)
- Position: Goalkeeper

Team information
- Current team: Randaberg
- Number: 30

Youth career
- –2002: University of Burundi

Senior career*
Years	Team	Apps	(Gls)
2007–2010	Randaberg	40	(0)
2011	Sandnes Ulf	0	(0)
2012	Randaberg	8	(0)
2012–	Ålgård FK	0	(0)

International career^{‡}
2008–	Burundi	8	(0)
- * Club domestic league appearances and goals as of 14 July 2012 ‡ National team caps and goals as of 14 July 2012

Janvier Ndikumana (born 17 February 1983) is a Burundian goalkeeper who currently plays for Randaberg.

He played his first international game on 21 June 2008 in Rades against Tunisia, he played 21 minutes and to collect a red card through professional foul.
