= Henrik Dahl (footballer) =

Swedish footballer (born 1975)

Personal information
- Date of birth: 1 May 1975 (age 51)
- Place of birth: Gödestad, Varberg, Norway
- Position: Defender

Senior career*
Years	Team	Apps	(Gls)
- Grimeton IK
- Varbergs BoIS
- BK Häcken
- GAIS
- Silkeborg IF
- Bærum SK
- Lyn Fotball
- * Club domestic league appearances and goals

Henrik Dahl (born 1 May 1975) is a Swedish football coach and former professional player who has been technical director at Bærum SK since December 2015. in the Norwegian 1st division.

== Playing career ==
Dahl was born in Gödestad, Varberg. He played for Grimeton IK, Varbergs BoIS FC, BK Häcken, GAIS, in Denmark for Silkeborg IF and in Norway for Bærum SK and FC Lyn Oslo. He played as a fullback.

== Coaching career ==
- Assistant manager: Bærum SK, 2012–2014
- Player development coach, 2013–2014
- UEFA-B license, 2012
- UEFA-A license, 2014
- UEFA Elite Youth A license, 2015
- Norges Fotballforbund FLK 4, 2018

== Personal life ==
After retiring from football, Dahl was a sales and marketing manager at Hard Rock Cafe, Oslo for three years, and then joined Radio Metro, Oslo as a key account manager in 2011. He was an assistant coach in Bærum SK for three years while also director of sports (children and youth) at Lyn Fotball in 2014–2015. Since December 2015 he has been technical director at Bærum SK and player development coach at Fotballprogresjon Norge AS.
