= Stefan Mogren =

Swedish footballer

Personal information
- Full name: Jan Stefan Mogren
- Date of birth: 27 May 1968 (age 58)
- Position: Defender

Senior career*
Years	Team	Apps	(Gls)
1987–1991	Västerås		
1992–1994	Örebro		
1994	Forward		
1995–1996	Oddevold		
1997–1999	Elfsborg		
2000–2001	Haugesund	22	(0)

International career
1997	Sweden B	1	(0)
- * Club domestic league appearances and goals

Jan Stefan Mogren (born 27 May 1968) is a Swedish former football defender. He represented the Sweden national B team once.
