= Diego de la Vega (footballer) =

Argentine footballer

Personal information
- Date of birth: 1 June 1979 (age 47)
- Place of birth: Buenos Aires, Argentina
- Height: 1.80 m (5 ft 11 in)
- Position: Defender

Senior career*
Years	Team	Apps	(Gls)
1999–2001	Argentinos Juniors		
2001–2002	Club Atletico Los Andes		
2002–2003	Bryne FK	6	(0)
2005–2012	CD Armenio		
2012–2013	Club Atlético San Telmo	28	(0)
2013–2014	Puan Football Club		
2015–20??	Club Unión Pigüé		
- * Club domestic league appearances and goals

Diego de la Vega (born 1 June 1979) is an Argentinean retired footballer who is last known to have played for Club Union Pigüé in his home country.

== Norway ==
Turning out for Bryne of the Norwegian Premier League in 2002 despite work permit problems early on, de la Vega left Argentina mainly because of the economic imbroglios happening there, making his debut in a 7-0 cup triumph over third division Vedavåg and involved in three goals. Not extending his visa in 2003, the Argentinean left Bryne that June.
