= 2015 Sarpsborg 08 FF season =

Sarpsborg 08
2015 season
- Chairman: Hans Petter Arnesen
- Manager: Geir Bakke
- Stadium: Sarpsborg Stadion
- Tippeligaen: 11th
- Norwegian Cup: Final
- Top goalscorer: League: Bojan Zajić (6); All: Bojan Zajić (8)
| Home colours | Away colours | Third colours |

The 2015 season is Sarpsborg 08's 4th season in Tippeligaen, following their return to the top level in 2012. It is also their first season with Geir Bakke as the club's manager.

== Squad ==
Note: Flags indicate national team as defined under FIFA eligibility rules; some limited exceptions apply. Players may hold more than one non-FIFA nationality.

| No. | Pos. | Nation | Player |
|---|---|---|---|
| 1 | GK | DEN | Lasse Heinze |
| 3 | DF | NOR | Andreas Nordvik |
| 4 | DF | NOR | Kjetil Berge |
| 6 | MF | NOR | Anders Trondsen |
| 7 | FW | NOR | Martin Wiig |
| 8 | FW | NGR | Kachi |
| 10 | MF | NED | Barry Maguire |
| 11 | MF | NOR | Kristoffer Tokstad |
| 13 | DF | NOR | Ole Hansen (captain) |
| 15 | DF | NOR | Sigurd Rosted |
| 16 | DF | NOR | Joachim Thomassen |
| 17 | MF | DEN | Steffen Ernemann |
| 19 | DF | ALG | Habib Bellaïd |
| 20 | MF | NOR | Simen Brenne |

| No. | Pos. | Nation | Player |
|---|---|---|---|
| 22 | MF | DEN | Claes Kronberg |
| 23 | MF | NOR | Tom Breive |
| 26 | DF | NOR | Martin Jensen |
| 27 | GK | JAM | Duwayne Kerr |
| 28 | FW | HUN | Péter Kovács |
| 29 | DF | NOR | Alexander Groven |
| 36 | MF | SRB | Bojan Zajić |
| 40 | GK | NOR | Markus Stige |
| 44 | FW | NOR | Leonard Getz |
| 69 | FW | DEN | Patrick Mortensen |
| 77 | FW | ETH | Amin Askar (on loan from Brann) |
| 92 | MF | NOR | Kamer Qaka |
| — | MF | NOR | Magnus Hart |

=== Out on loan ===
Note: Flags indicate national team as defined under FIFA eligibility rules; some limited exceptions apply. Players may hold more than one non-FIFA nationality.

| No. | Pos. | Nation | Player |
|---|---|---|---|
| 14 | FW | NOR | Badr Rahhaoui (at Kvik Halden) |

== Transfers ==
=== Winter ===
In: Note: Flags indicate national team as defined under FIFA eligibility rules; some limited exceptions apply. Players may hold more than one non-FIFA nationality.

| No. | Pos. | Nation | Player |
|---|---|---|---|
| 6 | MF | NOR | Anders Trondsen (from (Norway) Stabæk) |
| 8 | FW | EST | Henrik Ojamaa (loan from (Poland) Legia Warsaw) |
| 10 | MF | SWE | Liridon Kalludra (from (Norway) Kristiansund) |
| 15 | DF | NOR | Sigurd Rosted (from (Norway) Kjelsås) |
| 19 | DF | ALG | Habib Bellaïd (free agent) |
| 20 | MF | NOR | Simen Brenne (free agent) |
| 44 | FW | NOR | Leonard Getz (from (Norway) Fredrikstad) |
| 45 | GK | USA | Quentin Westberg (free agent) |
| 77 | FW | ETH | Amin Askar (on loan from (Norway) Brann) |
| 92 | MF | NOR | Kamer Qaka (from (Norway) Hønefoss) |
| — | MF | NOR | Magnus Hart (from (Norway) Fredrikstad) |
| — | FW | DEN | Patrick Mortensen (from (Denmark) Lyngby) |

Out: Note: Flags indicate national team as defined under FIFA eligibility rules; some limited exceptions apply. Players may hold more than one non-FIFA nationality.

| No. | Pos. | Nation | Player |
|---|---|---|---|
| 1 | GK | NOR | Gudmund Taksdal Kongshavn (loan return to (Norway) Vålerenga) |
| 6 | DF | GER | Jérome Polenz (to (Australia) Brisbane Roar) |
| 8 | MF | ISL | Guðmundur Þórarinsson (to (Denmark) FC Nordsjælland) |
| 10 | FW | CRC | Alejandro Castro (loan return to (Norway) Start) |
| 25 | MF | NOR | Martin Hoel Andersen (on loan to (Norway) Kvik Halden) |
| 31 | GK | NOR | Christian Sukke (on loan to (Norway) Sogndal) |
| 43 | DF | NOR | Brice Wembangomo (on loan to (Norway) Kvik Halden) |
| 69 | DF | FRA | Jérémy Berthod (retired) |
| — | MF | NOR | Gagandeep Singh Lally |

=== Summer ===
In: Note: Flags indicate national team as defined under FIFA eligibility rules; some limited exceptions apply. Players may hold more than one non-FIFA nationality.

| No. | Pos. | Nation | Player |
|---|---|---|---|
| 1 | GK | DEN | Lasse Heinze (from (Denmark) Midtjylland) |
| 8 | FW | NGR | Kachi (from (Nigeria) Gee Lec IFA) |
| 10 | MF | NED | Barry Maguire |
| 24 | FW | NOR | Amani Dickson Mbedule (from (Norway) Trosvik) |
| 28 | FW | HUN | Péter Kovács (from (Norway) Strømsgodset) |
| 29 | DF | NOR | Alexander Groven (from (Norway) Hønefoss) |
| 69 | FW | DEN | Patrick Mortensen (from (Denmark) Lyngby) |

Out: Note: Flags indicate national team as defined under FIFA eligibility rules; some limited exceptions apply. Players may hold more than one non-FIFA nationality.

| No. | Pos. | Nation | Player |
|---|---|---|---|
| 5 | MF | NOR | Olav Øby (on loan to (Norway) Follo) |
| 8 | FW | EST | Henrik Ojamaa (loan return to (Poland) Legia Warsaw) |
| 10 | MF | SWE | Liridon Kalludra (to (Norway) Kristiansund) |
| 14 | FW | NOR | Badr Rahhaoui (on loan to (Norway) Kvik Halden) |
| 21 | FW | DEN | Oliver Feldballe (to (Denmark) Fredericia) |
| 45 | GK | USA | Quentin Westberg (to (France) Tours) |
| — | DF | NOR | Andreas Melleby (on loan to (Norway) Kvik Halden) |

== Competitions ==
=== Tippeligaen ===
==== Results summary ====
| Overall | | | | | | | | Home | | | | | | Away | | | | | |
| Pld | W | D | L | GF | GA | GD | Pts | W | D | L | GF | GA | GD | W | D | L | GF | GA | GD |
|---|---|---|---|---|---|---|---|---|---|---|---|---|---|---|---|---|---|---|---|
| 30 | 8 | 10 | 12 | 37 | 49 | −12 | 34 | 6 | 3 | 6 | 22 | 26 | −4 | 2 | 7 | 6 | 15 | 23 | −8 |

Last updated: 8 November 2015.
Source: see below

==== Results by round ====
| Round | 1 | 2 | 3 | 4 | 5 | 6 | 7 | 8 | 9 | 10 | 11 | 12 | 13 | 14 | 15 | 16 | 17 | 18 | 19 | 20 | 21 | 22 | 23 | 24 | 25 | 26 | 27 | 28 | 29 | 30 |
|---|---|---|---|---|---|---|---|---|---|---|---|---|---|---|---|---|---|---|---|---|---|---|---|---|---|---|---|---|---|---|
| Ground | A | H | A | H | H | A | H | A | H | A | H | A | H | A | H | A | H | A | H | A | H | A | H | A | A | H | A | H | A | H |
| Result | W | D | L | D | W | D | W | D | L | W | D | D | L | L | L | D | D | L | L | D | W | L | W | D | D | L | L | W | L | W |
| Position | 6 | 5 | 8 | 9 | 6 | 5 | 4 | 6 | 7 | 7 | 7 | 9 | 9 | 9 | 11 | 11 | 12 | 13 | 12 | 12 | 12 | 12 | 12 | 12 | 12 | 12 | 12 | 11 | 11 | 11 |

Updated to match(es) played on 8 November 2015. Source: see below
A = Away; H = Home; W = Win; D = Draw; L = Loss

==== Results ====
| 6 April 2015 1 | Tromsø | 0–1 | Sarpsborg 08 | Tromsø |
| 18:00 CEST (UTC+2) | Johansen (yellow card) 52' | Summary | Hansen 54'; Trondsen (yellow card) 57'; Nordvik (yellow card) 69' | Stadium: Alfheim stadion Attendance: 4,035; Referee: Ola Hobber Nilsen |

| 10 April 2015 2 | Sarpsborg 08 | 1–1 | Vålerenga | Sarpsborg |
| 19:00 CEST (UTC+2) | Nordvik 66' | Summary | Larsen (yellow card) 43'; Stengel (yellow card) 49'; Zahid 68' | Stadium: Sarpsborg stadion Attendance: 5,137; Referee: Tom Harald Hagen |

| 19 April 2015 3 | Sandefjord | 1–0 | Sarpsborg 08 | Sandefjord |
| 18:00 CEST (UTC+2) | Larsen (yellow card) 35'; Lamøy (yellow card) 35'; Hansen 64'; Mjelde (yellow card) 69'; Torp (yellow card) 80' | Summary | Ojamaa (red card) 54'; Berge (yellow card) 87'; Ernemann (yellow card) 90+2' | Stadium: Komplett Arena; Attendance: 4,450; Referee: Tommy Skjerven |

| 26 April 2015 4 | Sarpsborg 08 | 2–2 | Bodø/Glimt | Sarpsborg |
| 18:00 CEST (UTC+2) | Hansen 20'; Trondsen (yellow card) 42'; Ernemann 53' | Summary | Saltnes (yellow card) 1'; Azemi 22' (pen.); Moe (yellow card) 51'; Hansen 76' (o.g.) | Stadium: Sarpsborg Stadion; Attendance: 3,471; Referee: Anders Johansen |

| 29 April 2015 5 | Sarpsborg 08 | 2–0 | Odd | Sarpsborg |
| 19:00 CEST (UTC+2) | Ernemann (yellow card) 3'; Jensen 20'; Askar 34' (yellow card) 90+5' | Summary | Ruud (yellow card) 15'; Samuelsen (yellow card) 51' | Stadium: Sarpsborg Stadion; Attendance: 3,151; Referee: Ola Hobber Nilsen |

| 2 May 2015 6 | Strømsgodset | 1–1 | Sarpsborg 08 | Drammen |
| 18:00 CET (UTC+1) | Fossum 23'; Ovenstad (yellow card) 85' | Summary | Tokstad 16'; Hansen (yellow card) 52'; Askar (yellow card) 67'; Trondsen (yellow card) 67' | Stadium: Marienlyst stadion Attendance: 6,954; Referee: Dag Vidar Lafsås |

| 10 May 2015 7 | Sarpsborg 08 | 3–0 | Haugesund | Sarpsborg |
| 18:00 CEST (UTC+2) | Hansen 10'; Ernemann (yellow card) 58'; Nordvik 63'; Zajić 81' | Summary | | Stadium: Sarpsborg Stadion; Attendance: 3,432; Referee: Trond Ivar Døvle |

| 13 May 2015 8 | Aalesund | 2–2 | Sarpsborg 08 | Ålesund |
| 18:00 CEST (UTC+2) | James 56'; Mäntylä (yellow card) 70'; Larsen 86' | Summary | Grytebust 29' (o.g.); Zajić (yellow card) 78'; Kalludra 90' | Stadium: Color Line Stadion; Attendance: 6,478; Referee: Trygve Kjensli |

| 16 May 2015 9 | Sarpsborg 08 | 1–3 | Lillestrøm | Sarpsborg |
| 18:00 CEST (UTC+2) | Trondsen (yellow card) 37' (goal) 90+4' | Summary | Ernemann 19' (o.g.); Andersson (yellow card) 39' (goal) 50'; Krogstad 90+2' | Stadium: Sarpsborg Stadion; Attendance: 4,933; Referee: Svein Erik Edvartsen |

| 25 May 2015 10 | Start | 1–2 | Sarpsborg 08 | Kristiansand |
| 20:00 CEST (UTC+2) | Børufsen (yellow card) 30'; Hoff (red card) 40'; Vilhjálmsson 69' | Summary | Nordvik (yellow card) 27'; Kronberg (yellow card) 53'; Kerr (yellow card) 60'; Tokstad 65'; Wiig 86' | Stadium: Sør Arena; Referee: Trygve Kjensli |

| 31 May 2015 11 | Sarpsborg 08 | 0–1 | Stabæk | Sarpsborg |
| 18:00 CEST (UTC+2) | Jensen (yellow card) 50' | Summary | Diomande 68' | Stadium: Sarpsborg Stadion; Attendance: 3,977; Referee: Anders Johansen |

| 7 June 2015 12 | Mjøndalen | 1–1 | Sarpsborg 08 | Mjøndalen |
| 18:00 CEST (UTC+2) | Gauseth 24' (pen.); Olsen (yellow card) 45'; Sosseh (yellow card) 75'; Arneberg (yellow card) 89' | Summary | Kerr (yellow card) 23'; Ernemann (yellow card) 73'; Zajić 87' | Stadium: Isachsen Stadion; Attendance: 2 556; Referee: Tore Hansen |

| 21 June 2015 13 | Sarpsborg 08 | 0–2 | Rosenborg | Sarpsborg |
| 20:00 CEST (UTC+2) | Ernemann (yellow card) 72' | Summary | Eyjólfsson (yellow card) 27'; Helland 40'; Jensen (yellow card) 43' (goal) 66'; Selnæs (yellow card) 45' | Stadium: Sarpsborg Stadion; Attendance: 4,900; Referee: Svein-Erik Edvartsen |

| 28 June 2015 14 | Viking | 3–1 | Sarpsborg 08 | Stavanger |
| 15:30 CEST (UTC+2) | Berisha 36', 58' (yellow card) 37'; Böðvarsson 53' | Summary | Askar (yellow card) 34'; Nordvik 42' | Stadium: Viking Stadion; Attendance: 8,822; Referee: Ola Hobber Nilsen |

| 3 July 2015 15 | Sarpsborg 08 | 1–4 | Molde | Sarpsborg |
| 19:00 CEST (UTC+2) | Bellaïd (yellow card) 67'; Zajić 90+1' | Summary | Kamara 7', 57', 90+1'; Svendsen 21' | Stadium: Sarpsborg Stadion; Attendance: 3,588; Referee: Tommy Skjerven |

| 12 July 2015 16 | Stabæk | 0–0 | Sarpsborg 08 | Bærum |
| 15:30 CEST (UTC+2) | Diomande (yellow card) 59' | Summary | Jensen (yellow card) 43'; Trondsen (yellow card) 49'; Øby (yellow card) 58' | Stadium: Nadderud Stadion; Attendance: 3,298; Referee: Svein Oddvar Moen |

| 26 July 2015 17 | Sarpsborg 08 | 2–2 | Mjøndalen | Sarpsborg |
| 18:00 CEST (UTC+2) | Kovács 42'; Mortensen 64' | Summary | Sosseh (yellow card) 22' (goal) 57'; Aasmundsen (yellow card) 53'; Kapidzic (yellow card) 87'; Sundli 90' | Stadium: Sarpsborg Stadion; Attendance: 3,368; Referee: Svein Erik Edvartsen |

| 2 August 2015 18 | Rosenborg | 3–2 | Sarpsborg 08 | Trondheim |
| 20:00 CEST (UTC+2) | Midtsjø 51' (yellow card) 53'; Helland 59'; Søderlund 84' | Summary | Tokstad (yellow card) 43'; Mortensen 44'; Ernemann 65'; Askar (yellow card) 67' | Stadium: Lerkendal Stadion; Attendance: 13,779; Referee: Trond Ivar Døvle |

| 8 August 2015 19 | Sarpsborg 08 | 0–2 | Viking | Sarpsborg |
| 18:00 CEST (UTC+2) | Bellaïd (yellow card) 10' | Summary | Danielsen 44' (pen.); Böðvarsson 81' | Stadium: Sarpsborg Stadion; Attendance: 3,986; Referee: Trygve Kjensli |

| 15 August 2015 20 | Molde | 0–0 | Sarpsborg 08 | Molde |
| 15:30 CEST (UTC+2) | Flo (yellow card) 78'; Moström (yellow card) 90+3' | Summary | Kronberg (yellow card) 90+4' | Stadium: Aker Stadion; Attendance: 8,157; Referee: Ole Gya |

| 23 August 2015 21 | Sarpsborg 08 | 3–1 | Aalesund | Sarpsborg |
| 18:00 CEST (UTC+2) | Zajić 10'; Wiig 20', 54'; Hansen (yellow card) 64'; Askar (yellow card) 82' | Summary | James 65' (pen.) | Stadium: Sarpsborg Stadion; Attendance: 3,533; Referee: Tore Hansen |

| 30 August 2015 22 | Bodø/Glimt | 3–1 | Sarpsborg 08 | Bodø |
| 18:00 CEST (UTC+2) | Sørloth 38', 89'; Jacobsen (yellow card) 81'; Olsen 88' | Summary | Trondsen (yellow card) 55'; Zajić 61'; Kronberg (yellow card) 90+2' | Stadium: Aspmyra stadion Attendance: 3,230; Referee: Svein Oddvar Moen |

| 13 September 2015 23 | Sarpsborg 08 | 3–1 | Start | Sarpsborg |
| 18:00 CEST (UTC+2) | Mortensen 3'; Tokstad 16'; Groven (yellow card) 45'; Wiig 68' | Summary | Børufsen 78' | Stadium: Sarpsborg Stadion; Attendance: 3,485; Referee: Andres Johansen |

| 20 September 2015 24 | Haugesund | 1–1 | Sarpsborg 08 | Haugesund |
| 18:00 CEST (UTC+2) | Stølås 27'; Troost-Ekong (yellow card) 33'; Haukås (yellow card) 40'; Bjørnbak (yellow card) 45+2' | Summary | Wiig (yellow card) 22'; Groven (yellow card) 34'; Nordvik (yellow card) 44'; Maguire 87'; Trondsen (yellow card) 89' | Stadium: Haugesund Stadion; Attendance: 4,766; Referee: Espen Eskås |

| 27 September 2015 25 | Odd | 1–1 | Sarpsborg 08 | Skien |
| 15:30 CEST (UTC+2) | Diouf 13'; Gashi (yellow card) 21' | Summary | Ernemann (yellow card) 83'; Kachi 90+1' (yellow card) 90+2' | Stadium: Skagerak Arena; Attendance: 7,599; Referee: Omar Rafiq |

| 3 October 2015 26 | Sarpsborg 08 | 1–6 | Strømsgodset | Sarpsborg |
| 15:30 CEST (UTC+2) | Kovács (yellow card) 30'; Groven (yellow card) 43'; Askar 53' | Summary | Wikheim 18', 56'; Storflor 37'; Horn (yellow card) 48'; Fossum 49'; Jradi 84'; Sørum 86' | Stadium: Sarpsborg Stadion; Attendance: 4,172; Referee: Ole Gya |

| 18 October 2015 27 | Vålerenga | 3–1 | Sarpsborg 08 | Oslo |
| 18:00 CEST (UTC+2) | Ómarsson 32'; Zahid 35'; Holm 57' | Summary | Askar (yellow card) 27'; Groven 51' | Stadium: Ullevaal Stadion; Attendance: 6,908; Referee: Tommy Skjerven |

| 24 October 2015 28 | Sarpsborg 08 | 1–0 | Tromsø | Sarpsborg |
| 15:30 CEST (UTC+2) | Wiig 55'; Kachi (yellow card) 76' | Summary | | Stadium: Sarpsborg Stadion; Referee: Espen Berntsen |

| 1 November 2015 29 | Lillestrøm | 3–1 | Sarpsborg 08 | Lillestrøm |
| 18:00 CET (UTC+1) | Friday 49'; Margeirsson (yellow card) 58'; Mikalsen 74'; Knudtzon 90+1' | Summary | Zajić 90+3' (pen.) | Stadium: Åråsen Stadion; Attendance: 6,085; Referee: Espen Eskås |

| 8 November 2015 30 | Sarpsborg 08 | 2–1 | Sandefjord | Sarpsborg |
| 18:00 CET (UTC+1) | Kachi 57'; Ernemann 90+3' (pen.) | Summary | Morer (yellow card) 45'; Sellin 63'; Busk (yellow card) 90+3' | Stadium: Sarpsborg Stadion; Attendance: 3,540; Referee: Espen Berntsen |

==== Table ====
| Pos | Team | Pld | W | D | L | GF | GA | GD | Pts |
|---|---|---|---|---|---|---|---|---|---|
| 9 | Bodø/Glimt | 30 | 12 | 4 | 14 | 53 | 56 | −3 | 40 |
| 10 | Aalesund | 30 | 11 | 5 | 14 | 42 | 57 | −15 | 38 |
| 11 | Sarpsborg 08 | 30 | 8 | 10 | 12 | 37 | 49 | −12 | 34 |
| 12 | Haugesund | 30 | 8 | 7 | 15 | 33 | 52 | −19 | 31 |
| 13 | Tromsø | 30 | 7 | 8 | 15 | 36 | 50 | −14 | 29 |

Source: Football Association of Norway (in Norwegian), Soccerway
Rules for classification: 1) Points; 2) Goal difference; 3) Goals scored; 4) Head-to-head points; 5) Head-to-head goal difference; 6) Head-to-head away goals scored (between two teams).

=== Norwegian Cup ===
| 22 April 2015 First Round | Kråkerøy | 0–4 | Sarpsborg 08 | Kråkerøy |
| 18:00 CEST (UTC+2) | Jarmalavicius (yellow card) 41'; Stafseng (yellow card) 64' | Summary | Ojamaa 39', 56'; Breive 42' (pen.); Askar 70' | Stadium: Kråkerøy Stadium; Attendance: 1,247; Referee: Torkel Jonsson Trædal |

| 7 May 2015 Second Round | Grorud | 0–3 | Sarpsborg 08 | Oslo |
| 18:00 CEST (UTC+2) | Darboe (yellow card) 17'; Akinyemi (yellow card) 29'; Mahnin (yellow card) 76' | Summary | Zajić 6', 41'; Kalludra 66' | Stadium: Grorud matchbane Attendance: 214; Referee: Ajdin Medic |

| 3 June 2015 Third Round | Gjøvik-Lyn | 0–2 | Sarpsborg 08 | Gjøvik |
| 18:00 CEST (UTC+2) | Sørum (yellow card) 57' | Summary | Trondsen 26'; Feldballe (yellow card) 72'; Qaka 73' | Stadium: Gjøvik Stadion; Attendance: 804; Referee: Bjørn Hansen |

| 24 June 2015 Fourth Round | Brann | 0–0 (a.e.t.) (1–4 p) | Sarpsborg 08 | Bergen |
| 20:00 CEST (UTC+2) | Haugen (yellow card) 84' | Summary | Askar (yellow card) 120' | Stadium: Brann Stadion; Attendance: 2,100; Referee: Tommy Skjerven |
| | Penalties |
| | Larsen (penalty scored); Demidov (penalty missed); E.Hansson (penalty missed) | | (penalty scored) Ernemann; (penalty scored) Øby; (penalty scored) Askar; (penalty scored) Bellaïd |

| 12 August 2015 Quarterfinal | Sarpsborg 08 | 2–1 | Odd | Sarpsborg |
| 18:00 CEST (UTC+2) | Zajić (yellow card) 9'; Mortensen 14', 47'; Trondsen (yellow card) 63' | Summary | Trondsen 6' (o.g.); Occéan (yellow card) 8'; Samuelsen (yellow card) 49'; Bentley (yellow card) 81'; Jonassen (yellow card) 86' | Stadium: Sarpsborg Stadion; Attendance: 2,366; Referee: Ken Henry Johnsen |

| 24 September 2015 Semifinal | Viking | 0–1 (a.e.t.) | Sarpsborg 08 | Stavanger |
| 20:00 CEST (UTC+2) | Soares (yellow card) 112' | Report | Trondsen (yellow card) 77'; Mortensen 98' | Stadium: Viking Stadion; Attendance: 12,942; Referee: Dag Vidar Hafsås |

==== Final ====
| 22 November 2015 | Rosenborg | 2–0 | Sarpsborg 08 | Oslo |
| 13:15 CET (UTC+1) | Helland 22'; Søderlund (yellow card) 24'; Jensen 40'; Skjelvik (yellow card) 45'; Midtsjø (yellow card) 45' | Report | Hansen (yellow card) 14'; Askar (yellow card) 55' | Stadium: Ullevaal Stadion; Attendance: 26,507; Referee: Ken Henry Johnsen |

== Squad statistics ==
As of match played 22 November 2015

=== Appearances and goals ===
| No. | Pos | Nat | Player | Total | | Tippeligaen | | Norwegian Cup | |
| No. | Pos | Nat | Player | Apps | Goals | Apps | Goals | Apps | Goals |
|---|---|---|---|---|---|---|---|---|---|
| 1 | GK | (Denmark) DEN | Lasse Heinze | 4 | 0 | 3 | 0 | 1 | 0 |
| 3 | DF | (Norway) NOR | Andreas Nordvik | 30 | 3 | 21+5 | 3 | 4 | 0 |
| 4 | DF | (Norway) NOR | Kjetil Berge | 21 | 0 | 13+2 | 0 | 6 | 0 |
| 6 | MF | (Norway) NOR | Anders Trondsen | 29 | 2 | 24 | 1 | 5 | 1 |
| 7 | FW | (Norway) NOR | Martin Wiig | 23 | 5 | 14+6 | 5 | 3 | 0 |
| 8 | FW | (Nigeria) NGR | Kachi | 8 | 2 | 2+5 | 2 | 0+1 | 0 |
| 10 | MF | (Netherlands) NED | Barry Maguire | 4 | 1 | 1+2 | 1 | 1 | 0 |
| 11 | MF | (Norway) NOR | Kristoffer Tokstad | 32 | 3 | 23+3 | 3 | 4+2 | 0 |
| 13 | DF | (Norway) NOR | Ole Hansen | 28 | 3 | 23+2 | 3 | 2+1 | 0 |
| 15 | DF | (Norway) NOR | Sigurd Rosted | 1 | 0 | 0+1 | 0 | 0 | 0 |
| 16 | DF | (Norway) NOR | Joachim Thomassen | 7 | 0 | 5 | 0 | 2 | 0 |
| 17 | MF | (Denmark) DEN | Steffen Ernemann | 33 | 3 | 28 | 3 | 5 | 0 |
| 19 | DF | (Algeria) ALG | Habib Bellaïd | 9 | 0 | 5+2 | 0 | 2 | 0 |
| 20 | MF | (Norway) NOR | Simen Brenne | 12 | 0 | 5+4 | 0 | 1+2 | 0 |
| 22 | DF | (Denmark) DEN | Claes Kronberg | 32 | 0 | 24+1 | 0 | 4+3 | 0 |
| 23 | MF | (Norway) NOR | Tom Breive | 9 | 1 | 5+2 | 0 | 1+1 | 1 |
| 24 | FW | (Norway) NOR | Amani Dickson Mbedule | 2 | 0 | 0+2 | 0 | 0 | 0 |
| 26 | DF | (Norway) NOR | Martin Jensen | 21 | 1 | 14+3 | 1 | 4 | 0 |
| 27 | GK | (Jamaica) JAM | Duwayne Kerr | 25 | 0 | 23 | 0 | 2 | 0 |
| 28 | FW | (Hungary) HUN | Péter Kovács | 12 | 1 | 5+5 | 1 | 0+2 | 0 |
| 29 | DF | (Norway) NOR | Alexander Groven | 13 | 1 | 11 | 1 | 2 | 0 |
| 36 | MF | (Serbia) SRB | Bojan Zajić | 34 | 8 | 18+10 | 6 | 6 | 2 |
| 42 | MF | (Norway) NOR | Magnus Hart | 2 | 0 | 0+2 | 0 | 0 | 0 |
| 46 | DF | (Norway) NOR | Patrick Johnsen | 1 | 0 | 0 | 0 | 0+1 | 0 |
| 69 | FW | (Denmark) DEN | Patrick Mortensen | 13 | 6 | 10 | 3 | 3 | 3 |
| 77 | FW | (Ethiopia) ETH | Amin Askar | 33 | 3 | 27 | 2 | 6 | 1 |
| 92 | MF | (Norway) NOR | Kamer Qaka | 16 | 1 | 4+8 | 0 | 2+2 | 1 |
Players away from Sarpsborg 08 on loan:
| 5 | MF | (Norway) NOR | Olav Øby | 8 | 0 | 2+3 | 0 | 0+3 | 0 |
| 25 | MF | (Norway) NOR | Martin Hoel Andersen | 0 | 0 | 0 | 0 | 0 | 0 |
| 31 | GK | (Norway) NOR | Christian Sukke | 0 | 0 | 0 | 0 | 0 | 0 |
| 43 | DF | (Norway) NOR | Brice Wembangomo | 0 | 0 | 0 | 0 | 0 | 0 |
Players who left Sarpsborg 08 during the season:
| 8 | FW | (Estonia) EST | Henrik Ojamaa | 14 | 2 | 8+2 | 0 | 4 | 2 |
| 10 | MF | (Sweden) SWE | Liridon Kalludra | 18 | 2 | 6+8 | 1 | 3+1 | 1 |
| 21 | MF | (Denmark) DEN | Oliver Feldballe | 7 | 0 | 1+6 | 0 | 0 | 0 |
| 45 | GK | (United States) USA | Quentin Westberg | 8 | 0 | 4 | 0 | 4 | 0 |

=== Goal scorers ===
| Place | Position | Nation | Number | Name | Tippeligaen | Norwegian Cup | Total |
|---|---|---|---|---|---|---|---|
| 1 | MF | (Serbia) | 36 | Bojan Zajić | 6 | 2 | 8 |
| 2 | FW | (Denmark) | 69 | Patrick Mortensen | 3 | 3 | 6 |
| 3 | FW | (Norway) | 7 | Martin Wiig | 5 | 0 | 5 |
| 4 | DF | (Norway) | 13 | Ole Hansen | 3 | 0 | 3 |
| 4 | DF | (Norway) | 3 | Andreas Nordvik | 3 | 0 | 3 |
| 4 | MF | (Norway) | 11 | Kristoffer Tokstad | 3 | 0 | 3 |
| 4 | MF | (Denmark) | 17 | Steffen Ernemann | 3 | 0 | 3 |
| 4 | FW | (Ethiopia) | 77 | Amin Askar | 2 | 1 | 3 |
| 9 | FW | (Nigeria) | 8 | Kachi | 2 | 0 | 2 |
| 9 | MF | (Norway) | 6 | Anders Trondsen | 1 | 1 | 2 |
| 9 | MF | (Sweden) | 10 | Liridon Kalludra | 1 | 1 | 2 |
| 9 | FW | (Estonia) | 8 | Henrik Ojamaa | 0 | 2 | 2 |
| 13 | DF | (Norway) | 26 | Martin Jensen | 1 | 0 | 1 |
| 13 | FW | (Hungary) | 28 | Péter Kovács | 1 | 0 | 1 |
| 13 | MF | (Netherlands) | 10 | Barry Maguire | 1 | 0 | 1 |
| 13 | DF | (Norway) | 29 | Alexander Groven | 1 | 0 | 1 |
| 13 | MF | (Norway) | 23 | Tom Breive | 0 | 1 | 1 |
| 13 | MF | (Norway) | 92 | Kamer Qaka | 0 | 1 | 1 |
| 13 | | | | Own goal | 1 | 0 | 1 |
| | | | | TOTALS | 37 | 12 | 49 |

=== Disciplinary record ===
| Number | Nation | Position | Name | Tippeligaen | | Norwegian Cup | | Total | |
| Number | Nation | Position | Name | Yellow card | Red card | Yellow card | Red card | Yellow card | Red card |
| 3 | (Norway) | DF | Andreas Nordvik | 3 | 0 | 0 | 0 | 3 | 0 |
| 4 | (Norway) | DF | Kjetil Berge | 1 | 0 | 0 | 0 | 1 | 0 |
| 5 | (Norway) | MF | Olav Øby | 1 | 0 | 0 | 0 | 1 | 0 |
| 6 | (Norway) | MF | Anders Trondsen | 7 | 0 | 2 | 0 | 9 | 0 |
| 7 | (Norway) | FW | Martin Wiig | 1 | 0 | 0 | 0 | 1 | 0 |
| 8 | (Estonia) | FW | Henrik Ojamaa | 0 | 1 | 0 | 0 | 0 | 1 |
| 8 | (Nigeria) | FW | Kachi | 2 | 0 | 0 | 0 | 2 | 0 |
| 11 | (Norway) | MF | Kristoffer Tokstad | 1 | 0 | 0 | 0 | 1 | 0 |
| 13 | (Norway) | DF | Ole Hansen | 2 | 0 | 1 | 0 | 3 | 0 |
| 17 | (Denmark) | MF | Steffen Ernemann | 6 | 0 | 0 | 0 | 6 | 0 |
| 19 | (Algeria) | DF | Habib Bellaïd | 2 | 0 | 0 | 0 | 2 | 0 |
| 21 | (Norway) | MF | Oliver Feldballe | 0 | 0 | 1 | 0 | 1 | 0 |
| 22 | (Denmark) | DF | Claes Kronberg | 3 | 0 | 0 | 0 | 3 | 0 |
| 26 | (Norway) | DF | Martin Jensen | 2 | 0 | 0 | 0 | 2 | 0 |
| 27 | (Jamaica) | GK | Duwayne Kerr | 2 | 0 | 0 | 0 | 2 | 0 |
| 28 | (Hungary) | FW | Péter Kovács | 1 | 0 | 0 | 0 | 1 | 0 |
| 29 | (Norway) | DF | Alexander Groven | 3 | 0 | 0 | 0 | 3 | 0 |
| 36 | (Serbia) | MF | Bojan Zajić | 1 | 0 | 1 | 0 | 2 | 0 |
| 77 | (Ethiopia) | FW | Amin Askar | 6 | 0 | 2 | 0 | 8 | 0 |
| | | | TOTALS | 44 | 1 | 7 | 0 | 51 | 1 |
