= 2015 Norwegian Football Cup final =

- Event: 2015 Norwegian Football Cup
Rosenborg	Sarpsborg 08
2	0
- Date: 22 November 2015
- Venue: Ullevaal Stadion, Oslo
- Referee: Ken Henry Johnsen
- Attendance: 26,507

The 2015 Norwegian Football Cup final took place at Ullevaal Stadion in Oslo on November 22, 2015. Rosenborg were in their 16th final (9 wins and 6 runners-up) with a chance to win a Double, after they won a Tippeligaen, while Sarpsborg 08 were in their first final ever and had the chance to win the first trophy in the club's history.

== Route to the final ==
Rosenborg		Round	Sarpsborg 08	
Vuku (D4); A 3–0	Henderson 9', Malec 12', Nielsen 47'	First round	Kråkerøy (D3); A 4–0	Ojamaa 39', 56', Breive 42', Askar 70'
Fløya (D3); A 6–0	Nielsen 11', Midtsjø 21', Riski 31', Malec 38', 56', 58'	Second round	Grorud (D2); A 3–0	Zajić 6', 41', Kalludra 66'
Levanger (D1); A 7–0	Nielsen 4', Helland 9', 61', 82', Malec 15', 19', 76'	Third round	Gjøvik/Lyn (D2); A 2–0	Trondsen 26', Qaka 73'
Tromsdalen (D1); H 7–1	Malec 3', 70', Riski 6', Jensen 38', Helland 68', 86', Pedersen 77' o.g.	Fourth round	Brann (D1); A 0–0 (4–1 p)	
Mjøndalen (TL); H 4–0	Søderlund 16', de Lanlay 28', Vilhjálmsson 34', Helland 59'	Quarter-final	Odd (TL); H 2–1	Mortensen 14', 47'
Stabæk (TL); H 3–2 aet	Helland 7', Søderlund 78', Vilhjálmsson 95'	Semi-final	Viking (TL); A 1–0 aet	Mortensen 98'

- (TL) = Tippeligaen team
- (D1) = 1. divisjon team
- (D2) = 2. divisjon team
- (D3) = 3. divisjon team
- (D4) = 4. divisjon team

== Match ==
=== Details ===
22 November 2015
13:15 CET (UTC+1)

Rosenborg	2–0	Sarpsborg 08
Helland 22'; Jensen 40'	Report

Ullevaal Stadion, Oslo
Attendance: 26,507
Referee: Ken Henry Johnsen (Husøy & Foynland)

Rosenborg	Sarpsborg 08

Rosenborg:
GK	1	(Norway) André Hansen
RB	22	(Norway) Jonas Svensson
CB	5	(Iceland) Hólmar Örn Eyjólfsson
CB	16	(Norway) Jørgen Skjelvik	(yellow card) 45'
LB	3	(Sweden) Mikael Dorsin		(substituted off) 88'
RM	7	(Denmark) Mike Jensen (c)
CM	20	(Norway) Ole Kristian Selnæs
LM	21	(Norway) Fredrik Midtsjø	(yellow card) 45'	(substituted off) 62'
RW	23	(Norway) Pål André Helland
CF	15	(Norway) Alexander Søderlund	(yellow card) 24'
LW	19	(Norway) Yann-Erik de Lanlay		(substituted off) 90'
Substitutions:
GK	12	(Norway) Alexander Lund Hansen
DF	4	(Norway) Tore Reginiussen		(substituted on) 88'
FW	10	(Iceland) Matthías Vilhjálmsson
FW	11	(Denmark) Tobias Mikkelsen
DF	14	(Norway) Johan Lædre Bjørdal
MF	18	(Norway) Magnus Stamnestrø		(substituted on) 90'
MF	24	(Norway) Anders Konradsen		(substituted on) 71'
Head Coach:
(Norway) Kåre Ingebrigtsen

Sarpsborg 08:
GK	27	(Jamaica) Duwayne Kerr
RB	22	(Denmark) Claes Kronberg
CB	4	(Norway) Kjetil Berge
CB	13	(Norway) Ole Hansen (c)	(yellow card) 14'	(substituted off) 89'
RB	26	(Norway) Martin Thømt Jensen		(substituted off) 85'
DM	17	(Denmark) Steffen Ernemann
CM	77	(Norway) Amin Askar	(yellow card) 55'
CM	11	(Norway) Kristoffer Tokstad
AM	36	(Serbia) Bojan Zajić
CF	7	(Norway) Martin Wiig
CF	69	(Denmark) Patrick Mortensen		(substituted off) 83'
Substitutions:
GK	1	(Denmark) Lasse Heinze
FW	8	(Nigeria) Onyekachi Ugwuadu		(substituted on) 83'
DF	15	(Norway) Sigurd Rosted
DF	19	(Algeria) Habib Bellaïd
MF	20	(Norway) Simen Brenne		(substituted on) 85'
MF	23	(Norway) Tom Erik Breive
FW	28	(Hungary) Péter Kovács		(substituted on) 89'
Head Coach:
(Norway) Geir Bakke

MATCH OFFICIALS

- Assistant referees:
  - Tom Harald Grønevik (IL Gneist)
  - Ivar Michael Bergum Jahr (Raufoss IL)
- Fourth official: Martin Sleire Lundby (Bøverbru IL)

MATCH RULES

- 90 minutes.
- 30 minutes of extra-time if necessary.
- Penalty shoot-out if scores still level.
- Seven named substitutes.
- Maximum of three substitutions.

== See also ==
- 2015 Norwegian Football Cup
- 2015 Tippeligaen
- 2015 1. divisjon
- 2015 in Norwegian football
