= 2014 Sarpsborg 08 FF season =

Sarpsborg 08
2014 season
- Chairman: Hans Petter Arnesen
- Manager: Brian Deane
- Stadium: Sarpsborg Stadion
- Tippeligaen: 8th
- Norwegian Cup: Semi-final vs Odd
- Top goalscorer: League: Guðmundur Þórarinsson (7); All: Bojan Zajić (10)
- Highest home attendance: 4,722 vs Brann (4 June 2014)
- Lowest home attendance: 1,224 vs Follo (4 June 2014)
- Average home league attendance: 3,648
Home colours	Away colours	Third colours

The 2014 season is Sarpsborg 08's 3rd season in Tippeligaen, following their return to the top level in 2012. It is also their second, and final, season with Brian Deane as the club's manager, after he announced he would be leaving the club at the end of the season.

== Squad ==
Note: Flags indicate national team as defined under FIFA eligibility rules; some limited exceptions apply. Players may hold more than one non-FIFA nationality.

No.	Pos.	Nation	Player
1	GK	NOR	Gudmund Taksdal Kongshavn (on loan from Vålerenga)
3	DF	NOR	Andreas Nordvik
4	DF	NOR	Kjetil Berge
6	MF	GER	Jérome Polenz
7	FW	NOR	Martin Wiig
8	MF	ISL	Guðmundur Þórarinsson
10	FW	CRC	Jorge Castro
11	MF	NOR	Kristoffer Tokstad
12	MF	NOR	Olav Øby
13	DF	NOR	Ole Hansen (captain)
14	FW	NOR	Badr Rahhaoui
15	DF	NOR	Sindre Wormdahl

No.	Pos.	Nation	Player
16	DF	NOR	Joachim Thomassen
17	MF	DEN	Steffen Ernemann
21	MF	DEN	Oliver Feldballe
22	DF	DEN	Claes Kronberg
23	MF	NOR	Tom Breive
25	MF	NOR	Martin Andersen
26	DF	NOR	Martin Jensen
27	GK	JAM	Duwayne Kerr
31	GK	NOR	Christian Sukke
36	MF	SRB	Bojan Zajić
69	DF	FRA	Jérémy Berthod

== Transfers ==
=== Winter ===
In: Note: Flags indicate national team as defined under FIFA eligibility rules; some limited exceptions apply. Players may hold more than one non-FIFA nationality.

No.	Pos.	Nation	Player
3	DF	NOR	Andreas Nordvik (from (Norway) Aalesund)
11	MF	NOR	Kristoffer Tokstad (from (Norway) Strømmen)
16	DF	NOR	Joachim Thomassen (from (Norway) Vålerenga)
19	FW	CIV	Franck Dja Djédjé (from (Ukraine) Chornomorets)
36	MF	SRB	Bojan Zajić (from (Norway) Vålerenga)

Out: Note: Flags indicate national team as defined under FIFA eligibility rules; some limited exceptions apply. Players may hold more than one non-FIFA nationality.

No.	Pos.	Nation	Player
1	GK	ISL	Haraldur Björnsson (loan to (Norway) Strømmen)
3	DF	ESP	Álvaro Baigorri (to (Norway) Moss)
9	DF	NOR	Berat Jusufi (to (Norway) Moss)
19	MF	NOR	Mathias Engebretsen (to (Norway) Kvik Halden)
20	MF	NOR	Magnus Sylling Olsen (to (Norway) HamKam)
21	MF	NOR	Tobias Henanger (to (Norway) Kongsvinger)
24	FW	NOR	Mohamed Elyounoussi (to (Norway) Molde)
28	DF	FRA	Derek Decamps (loan return to (France) Angers)

=== Summer ===
In: Note: Flags indicate national team as defined under FIFA eligibility rules; some limited exceptions apply. Players may hold more than one non-FIFA nationality.

No.	Pos.	Nation	Player
1	GK	NOR	Gudmund Kongshavn (on loan from (Norway) Vålerenga)
6	MF	GER	Jérome Polenz (from (Australia) Western Sydney Wanderers)
10	FW	CRC	Jorge Castro (on loan from (Norway) Start)
21	FW	DEN	Oliver Feldballe (from (Netherlands) Cambuur)

Out: Note: Flags indicate national team as defined under FIFA eligibility rules; some limited exceptions apply. Players may hold more than one non-FIFA nationality.

No.	Pos.	Nation	Player
1	GK	ISL	Haraldur Björnsson (to (Sweden) Östersunds FK, previously on loan to (Norway) Strømmen)
5	MF	ISL	Þórarinn Ingi Valdimarsson (to (Iceland) IBV)
6	FW	NOR	Christian Brink (to (Norway) Stord)
19	FW	CIV	Franck Dja Djédjé (to (Belarus) Dinamo Minsk)
99	FW	NGR	Aaron Samuel (to (China) Guangzhou)

== Competitions ==
=== Tippeligaen ===
==== Results summary ====
Overall								Home						Away					
Pld	W	D	L	GF	GA	GD	Pts	W	D	L	GF	GA	GD	W	D	L	GF	GA	GD
30	10	10	10	41	48	−7	40	7	6	2	25	17	+8	3	4	8	16	31	−15

Last updated: 10 November 2014.
Source: see below

==== Results by round ====
Round	1	2	3	4	5	6	7	8	9	10	11	12	13	14	15	16	17	18	19	20	21	22	23	24	25	26	27	28	29	30
Ground	H	A	H	A	H	A	H	A	A	H	A	H	A	H	A	H	A	H	A	H	A	H	A	H	A	H	A	H	A	H
Result	W	D	D	L	W	L	W	L	L	D	D	D	L	W	D	W	W	L	D	L	L	D	W	W	L	D	W	D	L	W
Position	1	3	4	10	6	9	7	8	10	10	11	11	11	11	11	9	8	8	8	8	10	10	9	8	9	9	7	7	8	8

Updated to match(es) played on 10 November 2014. Source: see below
A = Away; H = Home; W = Win; D = Draw; L = Loss

==== Results ====
30 March 2014 1	Sarpsborg 08	3–0	Brann	Sarpsborg
19:00 CEST (UTC+2)	Zajić 20'; Samuel 37', 54' (pen.)	Summary		Stadium: Sarpsborg Stadion; Attendance: 4,722; Referee: Dag Vidar Hafsås

6 April 2014 2	Sogndal	1–1	Sarpsborg 08	Sogndalsfjøra
18:00 CEST (UTC+2)	Flo 56'	Summary	Dja Djédjé 2'	Stadium: Fosshaugane Campus; Attendance: 2,511; Referee: Omar Rafiq

13 April 2014 3	Sarpsborg 08	1–1	Start	Sarpsborg
18:00 CEST (UTC+2)	Ernemann 45'	Summary	Vikstøl 88'	Stadium: Sarpsborg Stadion; Attendance: 4,294; Referee: Ken Henry Johnsen

21 April 2014 4	Molde	5–1	Sarpsborg 08	Molde
18:00 CEST (UTC+2)	Gulbrandsen 25', 64'; Elyounoussi 60', 90+3'; Svendsen 89'	Summary	Samuel 20'	Stadium: Aker Stadion; Attendance: 8,870; Referee: Brage Sandmoen

28 April 2014 5	Sarpsborg 08	3–0	Vålerenga	Sarpsborg
19:00 CEST (UTC+2)	Dja Djédjé 62'; Samuel 75'; Zajić 80'	Summary		Stadium: Sarpsborg Stadion; Attendance: 4,616; Referee: Espen Berntsen

1 May 2014 6	Odd	2–0	Sarpsborg 08	Skien
18:00 CEST (UTC+2)	Samuelsen 18'; Johnsen 86'	Summary		Stadium: Skagerak Arena; Attendance: 6,603; Referee: Tom Harald Hagen

4 May 2014 7	Sarpsborg 08	2–1	Sandnes Ulf	Sarpsborg
15:30 CEST (UTC+2)	Berthod 39'; Hansen (red card) 67'; Samuel 75'	Summary	Midtsjø 15'	Stadium: Sarpsborg Stadion; Attendance: 3,800; Referee: Dag Vidar Hafsås

11 May 2014 8	Stabæk	3–2	Sarpsborg 08	Bærum
18:00 CEST (UTC+2)	Kassi 38'; Adu 43' (pen.); Brustad 45+1'	Summary	Þórarinsson 78'; Wiig 90+2'	Stadium: Nadderud Stadion; Attendance: 3,251; Referee: Tommy Skjerven

16 May 2014 9	Strømsgodset	4–1	Sarpsborg 08	Drammen
20:05 CEST (UTC+2)	Hamoud 25'; Kovács 45'; Vilsvik 88' (pen.); Ødegaard 90+1'	Summary	Kronberg 90+3'	Stadium: Marienlyst Stadion; Attendance: 6,427; Referee: Espen Berntsen

19 May 2014 10	Sarpsborg 08	1–1	Rosenborg	Sarpsborg
19:00 CEST (UTC+2)	Tokstad 68'	Summary	Svensson 29'	Stadium: Sarpsborg Stadion; Attendance: 4 618; Referee: Brage Sandmoen

25 May 2014 11	Aalesund	0–0	Sarpsborg 08	Ålesund
15:30 CEST (UTC+2)		Summary		Stadium: Color Line Stadion; Attendance: 7,731; Referee: Omar Rafiq

9 June 2014 12	Sarpsborg 08	1–1	Viking	Sarpsborg
15:30 CEST (UTC+2)	Ernemann 61'	Summary	Böðvarsson 46'	Stadium: Sarpsborg Stadion; Attendance: 3,810; Referee: Anders Johansen

12 June 2014 13	Haugesund	4–0	Sarpsborg 08	Haugesund
20:05 CEST (UTC+2)	Sema 14', 68'; Gytkjær 17'; Fevang 44'	Summary		Stadium: Haugesund Stadion; Attendance: 4,818; Referee: Trond Ivar Døvle

6 July 2014 14	Sarpsborg 08	2–1	Bodø/Glimt	Sarpsborg
18:00 CEST (UTC+2)	Zajić 22'; Wiig 86'	Summary	Badou 66'	Stadium: Sarpsborg Stadion; Attendance: 3,559; Referee: Martin Lundby

12 July 2014 15	Lillestrøm	0–0	Sarpsborg 08	Oslo
18:00 CEST (UTC+2)		Summary		Stadium: Åråsen Stadion; Attendance: 4,376; Referee: Tore Hansen

22 July 2014 16	Sarpsborg 08	3–2	Aalesund	Sarpsborg
19:00 CEST (UTC+2)	M.Jensen 22'; Kronberg 34', 47'	Summary	Larsen 62'; Abdellaoue 90'	Stadium: Sarpsborg Stadion; Attendance: 3,679; Referee: Trygve Kjensli

27 July 2014 17	Bodø/Glimt	3–4	Sarpsborg 08	Bodø
18:00 CEST (UTC+2)	Laajab 6', 57' (pen.); Badou 36'	Summary	Zajić 31'; M.Jensen 36'; Kronberg 81' (pen.); Þórarinsson 85'	Stadium: Aspmyra Stadion; Attendance: 2,841; Referee: Kristoffer Helgerud

3 August 2014 18	Sarpsborg 08	0–2	Haugesund	Sarpsborg
18:00 CEST (UTC+2)		Summary	Andreassen 39'; Gytkjær 50'	Stadium: Sarpsborg Stadion; Attendance: 3,637; Referee: Brage Sandmoen

9 August 2014 19	Vålerenga	2–2	Sarpsborg 08	Oslo
15:30 CEST (UTC+2)	Kjartansson 50' (pen.) (red card) 90'; Zahid 70'	Summary	T.Breive 54'; Tokstad 82'	Stadium: Ullevaal Stadion; Attendance: 8,992; Referee: Tom Harald Hagen

17 August 2014 20	Sarpsborg 08	0–2	Molde	Sarpsborg
18:00 CEST (UTC+2)		Summary	Tokstad 48' (o.g.); Høiland 76'	Stadium: Sarpsborg Stadion; Attendance: 3,778; Referee: Tore Hansen

24 August 2014 21	Rosenborg	2–0	Sarpsborg 08	Trondheim
18:00 CEST (UTC+2)	Søderlund 29', 80'	Summary		Stadium: Lerkendal Stadion; Attendance: 11 433; Referee: Per Ivar Staberg

30 August 2014 22	Sarpsborg 08	2–2	Odd	Sarpsborg
15:30 CEST (UTC+2)	K.Berge 16'; Castro 65'; T.Breive (yellow card) 35' (yellow-red card) 70'	Summary	Samuelsen 20'; Shala 79'	Stadium: Sarpsborg Stadion; Attendance: 3,582; Referee: Brage Sandmoen

14 September 2014 23	Sandnes Ulf	0–2	Sarpsborg 08	Sandnes
15:30 CEST (UTC+2)		Summary	Þórarinsson 26'; Tokstad 40'	Stadium: Sandnes Idrettspark; Attendance: 3,671; Referee: Tom Harald Hagen

21 September 2014 24	Sarpsborg 08	3–1	Sogndal	Sarpsborg
18:00 CEST (UTC+2)	Castro 43'; Feldballe 52'; Zajić 57'	Summary	Otoo 83'	Stadium: Sarpsborg Stadion; Attendance: 3,509; Referee: Anders Johansen

28 September 2014 25	Start	3–1	Sarpsborg 08	Kristiansand
18:00 CEST (UTC+2)	Ajer 22'; Tripić 80', 82'	Summary	Wiig 75'	Stadium: Sør Arena; Attendance: 4,950; Referee: Anders Johansen

5 October 2014 26	Sarpsborg 08	0–0	Strømsgodset	Sarpsborg
15:30 CEST (UTC+2)		Summary		Stadium: Sarpsborg Stadion; Attendance: 4,080; Referee: Ola Hobber Nilsen

17 October 2014 27	Brann	1–2	Sarpsborg 08	Bergen
19:00 CEST (UTC+2)	Haugen 26'	Summary	Nordvik 72'; Þórarinsson 82'	Stadium: Brann Stadion; Attendance: 10,204; Referee: Dag Vidar Hafsås

26 October 2014 28	Sarpsborg 08	1–1	Stabæk	Sarpsborg
15:30 CET (UTC+1)	Tokstad 67'	Summary	Boli 61'	Stadium: Sarpsborg Stadion; Attendance: 3,743; Referee: Ole Gya

2 November 2014 29	Viking	1–0	Sarpsborg 08	Stavanger
18:00 CET (UTC+1)	Nisja 55'	Summary		Stadium: Viking Stadion; Attendance: 8,492; Referee: Martin Lundby

9 November 2014 30	Sarpsborg 08	3–2	Lillestrøm	Sarpsborg
18:00 CET (UTC+1)	Kronberg 26' (pen.); Zajić 76'; Thomassen 82'	Summary	Mjelde 43'; Friday (yellow card) 60'; Pálmason 86'	Stadium: Sarpsborg Stadion; Attendance: 3,767; Referee: Per Ivar Staberg

==== Table ====
Pos	Team	Pld	W	D	L	GF	GA	GD	Pts
6	Vålerenga	30	11	9	10	59	53	+6	42
7	Aalesund	30	11	8	11	40	39	+1	41
8	Sarpsborg 08	30	10	10	10	41	48	−7	40
9	Stabæk	30	11	6	13	44	52	−8	39
10	Viking	30	8	12	10	42	42	0	36

Source: fotball.no
Rules for classification: 1) points; 2) goal difference; 3) number of goals scored.

=== Norwegian Cup ===
24 April 2014 First Round	Sarpsborg	0–11	Sarpsborg 08	Kurland
18:00 CEST (UTC+2)		Summary	Kronberg 10'; Zajić 15', 56'; M.Jensen 19'; Dja Djédjé 21', 86'; Valdimarsson 37'; Brink 63'; Tokstad 65', 87'; Þórarinsson 77'	Stadium: Kurland kunstgress Attendance: 702; Referee: Henrik Andreas Pettersen

7 May 2014 Second Round	Lørenskog	0–1	Sarpsborg 08	Lørenskog
18:00 CEST (UTC+2)		Summary	Þórarinsson 75'	Stadium: Rolvsrud Stadion; Attendance: 293; Referee: Bjørn Hansen

4 June 2014 Third Round	Sarpsborg 08	2–0	Follo	Sarpsborg
18:00 CEST (UTC+2)	Dja Djédjé 16'; Wiig 18'	Summary		Stadium: Sarpsborg Stadion; Attendance: 1,224; Referee: Svein-Erik Edvartsen

27 June 2014 Fourth Round	Sarpsborg 08	3–2	Start	Sarpsborg
19:00 CEST (UTC+2)	Samuel 3' (pen.), 57'; Dja Djédjé 81'	Summary	Hoff 56'; Vilhjálmsson 86'	Stadium: Sarpsborg Stadion; Attendance: 1,604; Referee: Espen Berntsen

14 August 2014 Quarter-finals	Lillestrøm	0–2	Sarpsborg 08	Lillestrøm
18:00 CEST (UTC+2)		Summary	Zajić 15'; Wiig 80'	Stadium: Åråsen Stadion; Attendance: 5,278; Referee: Ken Henry Johnsen

25 September 2014 Semifinals	Odd	5–2	Sarpsborg 08	Skien
19:45 CEST (UTC+2)	Shala 48', 71'; Halvorsen 58', 90+3'; Johnsen 66'	Summary	Zajić 37'; Thomassen (yellow card) 45' (yellow-red card) 47'; Þórarinsson 77'	Stadium: Skagerak Arena; Attendance: 12,293; Referee: Svein Oddvar Moen

== Squad statistics ==
As of match played 9 November 2014

=== Appearances and goals ===
No.	Pos	Nat	Player	Total		Tippeligaen		Norwegian Cup	
No.	Pos	Nat	Player	Apps	Goals	Apps	Goals	Apps	Goals
1	GK	(Norway) NOR	Gudmund Taksdal Kongshavn	9	0	7	0	2	0
3	DF	(Norway) NOR	Andreas Nordvik	11	1	6+4	1	1	0
4	DF	(Norway) NOR	Kjetil Berge	29	1	22+2	1	4+1	0
6	MF	(Germany) GER	Jérome Polenz	2	0	1+1	0	0	0
7	FW	(Norway) NOR	Martin Wiig	25	5	13+9	3	1+2	2
8	MF	(Iceland) ISL	Guðmundur Þórarinsson	34	7	29	4	5	3
10	FW	(Costa Rica) CRC	Jorge Castro	16	2	9+5	2	2	0
11	MF	(Norway) NOR	Kristoffer Tokstad	32	6	12+15	4	4+1	2
12	MF	(Norway) NOR	Olav Øby	22	0	3+14	0	1+4	0
13	DF	(Norway) NOR	Ole Hansen	31	0	26	0	5	0
16	DF	(Norway) NOR	Joachim Thomassen	23	1	18+1	1	3+1	0
17	MF	(Denmark) DEN	Steffen Ernemann	30	2	23+1	2	5+1	0
20	DF	(Norway) NOR	Brice Wembangomo	1	0	0+1	0	0	0
21	MF	(Denmark) DEN	Oliver Feldballe	11	1	6+3	1	2	0
22	DF	(Denmark) DEN	Claes Kronberg	34	6	28	5	6	1
23	MF	(Norway) NOR	Tom Breive	28	1	13+10	1	3+2	0
25	MF	(Norway) NOR	Martin Andersen	1	0	0	0	0+1	0
26	DF	(Norway) NOR	Martin Jensen	26	3	21	2	5	1
27	GK	(Jamaica) JAM	Duwayne Kerr	23	0	20	0	3	0
31	GK	(Norway) NOR	Christian Sukke	5	0	3+1	0	1	0
36	MF	(Serbia) SRB	Bojan Zajić	33	10	22+6	6	3+2	4
41	MF	(Norway) NOR	Gagandeep Singh Lally	1	0	0+1	0	0	0
69	DF	(France) FRA	Jérémy Berthod	18	1	15+1	1	2	0
Players away from Sarpsborg 08 on loan:
Players who left Sarpsborg 08 during the season:
5	MF	(Iceland) ISL	Þórarinn Ingi Valdimarsson	15	1	8+5	0	1+1	1
6	FW	(Norway) NOR	Christian Brink	2	1	1	0	0+1	1
19	FW	(Ivory Coast) CIV	Franck Dja Djédjé	18	6	13+1	2	4	4
99	FW	(Nigeria) NGR	Aaron Samuel	16	7	11+2	5	3	2

=== Goal scorers ===
Place	Position	Nation	Number	Name	Tippeligaen	Norwegian Cup	Total
1	MF	(Serbia)	36	Bojan Zajić	6	4	10
2	MF	(Iceland)	8	Guðmundur Þórarinsson	7	3	7
2	MF	(Nigeria)	99	Aaron Samuel	5	2	7
4	DF	(Denmark)	22	Claes Kronberg	5	1	6
4	MF	(Norway)	11	Kristoffer Tokstad	4	2	6
4	FW	(Ivory Coast)	19	Franck Dja Djédjé	2	4	6
7	FW	(Norway)	7	Martin Wiig	3	2	5
8	DF	(Norway)	26	Martin Jensen	2	1	3
9	MF	(Denmark)	17	Steffen Ernemann	2	0	2
9	FW	(Costa Rica)	10	Jorge Castro	2	0	2
11	DF	(France)	69	Jérémy Berthod	1	0	1
11	MF	(Norway)	23	Tom Breive	1	0	1
11	DF	(Norway)	4	Kjetil Berge	1	0	1
11	MF	(Denmark)	21	Oliver Feldballe	1	0	1
11	DF	(Norway)	3	Andreas Nordvik	1	0	1
11	DF	(Norway)	16	Joachim Thomassen	1	0	1
11	MF	(Iceland)	5	Þórarinn Ingi Valdimarsson	0	1	1
11	DF	(Norway)	6	Christian Brink	0	1	1
				TOTALS	41	21	62

=== Disciplinary record ===
Number	Nation	Position	Name	Tippeligaen		Norwegian Cup		Total	
Number	Nation	Position	Name	Yellow card	Red card	Yellow card	Red card	Yellow card	Red card
3	(Norway)	DF	Andreas Nordvik	1	0	1	0	2	0
4	(Norway)	DF	Kjetil Berge	3	0	0	0	3	0
5	(Iceland)	MF	Þórarinn Ingi Valdimarsson	1	0	0	0	1	0
8	(Iceland)	MF	Guðmundur Þórarinsson	3	0	1	0	4	0
10	(Costa Rica)	FW	Jorge Castro	1	0	0	0	1	0
11	(Norway)	MF	Kristoffer Tokstad	1	0	0	0	1	0
13	(Norway)	DF	Ole Hansen	3	1	1	0	4	1
16	(Norway)	DF	Joachim Thomassen	1	0	2	1	3	1
17	(Denmark)	MF	Steffen Ernemann	4	0	0	0	4	0
19	(Ivory Coast)	FW	Franck Dja Djédjé	3	0	0	0	3	0
22	(Denmark)	DF	Claes Kronberg	3	0	1	0	4	0
23	(Norway)	MF	Tom Breive	5	1	0	0	5	1
26	(Norway)	DF	Martin Jensen	3	0	0	0	3	0
27	(Jamaica)	GK	Duwayne Kerr	2	0	0	0	2	0
69	(France)	DF	Jérémy Berthod	2	0	0	0	2	0
99	(Nigeria)	FW	Aaron Samuel	3	0	0	0	3	0
			TOTALS	39	2	6	1	45	3
