= Andreas Nordvik =

Norwegian footballer (born 1987)

Personal information
- Full name: Andreas Kristoffer Nordvik
- Date of birth: 18 March 1987 (age 39)
- Place of birth: Trondheim, Norway
- Height: 1.87 m (6 ft 2 in)
- Position: Centre-back

Team information
- Current team: Byåsen

Youth career
- –2004: Nardo
- 2004–2006: Rosenborg

Senior career*
Years	Team	Apps	(Gls)
2006–2010	Rosenborg	18	(0)
2007	→ Haugesund (loan)	8	(0)
2009	→ Vålerenga (loan)	9	(0)
2010–2013	Vålerenga	66	(1)
2013	Aalesund	12	(0)
2014–2016	Sarpsborg 08	36	(4)
2016–2017	Esbjerg	24	(2)
2017	Viking	8	(1)
2018	FC Fredericia	7	(0)
2018	Odd	2	(0)
2019–	Byåsen	4	(0)

International career
2005	Norway U18	2	(0)
2007–2008	Norway U21	7	(0)
- * Club domestic league appearances and goals as of 17:41, 10 June 2021 (UTC)

Andreas Kristoffer Nordvik (born 18 March 1987) is a Norwegian footballer who plays as a centre-back for Byåsen Toppfotball. He is renowned for having equally good left and right foot ability, good speed and being a tough defensive player.

== Career ==
Nordvik signed with Danish club FC Fredericia in February 2018, but left the club again, as he signed with Odd in August 2018. After the 2018 season Odds BK announced, that Nordvik alongside 2 other players, would leave the club.

On 7 June 2019, Nordvik joined Byåsen Toppfotball.

== Honours ==
=== Club ===
Rosenborg BK

- Tippeligaen: 2009

Vålerenga

- Tippeligaen:
  - Runner-up (1): 2010

== Career statistics ==
As of match played 18 August 2019

Club	Season	Division	League		Cup		Continental		Other		Total	
Club	Season	Division	Apps	Goals	Apps	Goals	Apps	Goals	Apps	Goals	Apps	Goals
Rosenborg	2007	Tippeligaen	4	0	0	0	0	0	—		4	0
Rosenborg	2008	Tippeligaen	9	0	0	0	6	0	—		15	0
Rosenborg	2009	Tippeligaen	5	0	2	0	2	0	—		9	0
Rosenborg	Total		18	0	2	0	8	0	—		28	0
Haugesund (loan)	2007	Norwegian First Division	8	0	3	0	—		—		11	0
Vålerenga (loan)	2009	Tippeligaen	9	0	2	0	—		—		11	0
Vålerenga	2010	Tippeligaen	26	0	1	0	—		—		27	0
Vålerenga	2011	Tippeligaen	22	0	2	0	4	0	—		28	0
Vålerenga	2012	Tippeligaen	18	1	3	0	—		—		21	1
Vålerenga	Total		66	1	6	0	4	0	—		76	1
Aalesund	2013	Tippeligaen	12	0	2	1	—		—		14	1
Sarpsborg 08	2014	Tippeligaen	10	1	2	0	—		—		12	1
Sarpsborg 08	2015	Tippeligaen	26	3	5	0	—		—		31	3
Sarpsborg 08	Total		36	4	7	0	—		—		43	4
Esbjerg	2016–17	Danish Superliga	24	2	1	0	—		2 (Note: Appearances in relegation play-offs.)	0	27	2
Viking	2017	Eliteserien	8	1	0	0	—		—		8	1
FC Fredericia	2017–18	Danish 1st Division	7	0	1	0	—		—		8	0
Odd	2018	Eliteserien	2	0	0	0	—		—		2	0
Byåsen	2019	2. divisjon	4	0	0	0	—		—		4	0
Career total			194	8	24	1	12	0	2	0	232	9
