= Alexander Groven =

Norwegian footballer (born 1992)

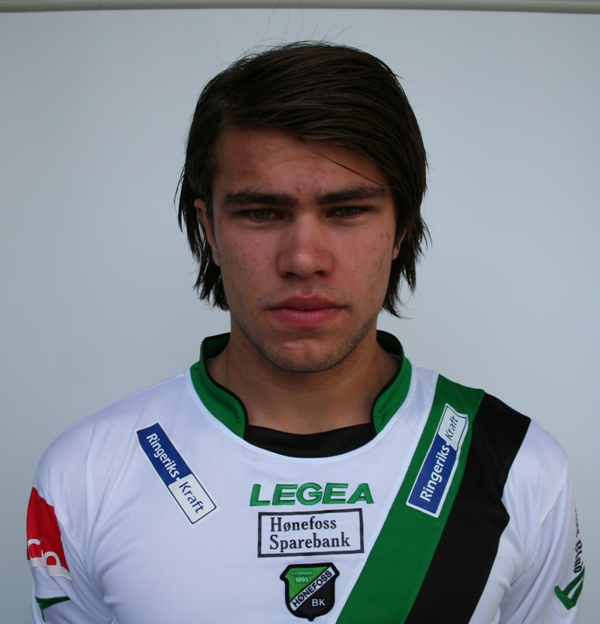

Personal information
- Full name: Alexander Groven
- Date of birth: 2 January 1992 (age 34)
- Place of birth: Oslo, Norway
- Height: 1.83 m (6 ft 0 in)
- Position: Left-back

Team information
- Current team: Hønefoss
- Number: 29

Youth career
- Frigg Oslo FK
- Lyn

Senior career*
| Years | Team | Apps | (Gls) |
| 2009–2010 | Lyn | 8 | (0) |
| 2010–2015 | Hønefoss | 103 | (6) |
| 2015–2017 | Sarpsborg 08 | 35 | (2) |
| 2018 | Hønefoss | 21 | (2) |
| 2019 | KA | 13 | (1) |
| 2020– | Hønefoss | 79 | (9) |

International career
| 2012 | Norway U21 | 2 | (1) |
- * Club domestic league appearances and goals as of 3 November 2025

Alexander Groven (né Hassum; born 2 January 1992) is a Norwegian footballer who plays as a left-back for Hønefoss BK.

== Career ==
He started his career in Frigg Oslo FK. He later joined Lyn Oslo's junior team. He made his senior debut on 4 October 2009 against Lillestrøm, as a substitute in the 82nd minute.

In July 2015 Groven sign a deal with Tippeligaen side Sarpsborg 08.

Ahead of the 2020 season, Groven returned to Hønefoss BK for the third time, after a year in Iceland.

== Career statistics ==
| Season | Club | Division | League | | Cup | | Total | |
| Season | Club | Division | Apps | Goals | Apps | Goals | Apps | Goals |
|---|---|---|---|---|---|---|---|---|
| 2009 | Lyn | Tippeligaen | 1 | 0 | 0 | 0 | 1 | 0 |
| 2010 | Lyn | Adeccoligaen | 7 | 0 | 2 | 0 | 9 | 0 |
| 2010 | Hønefoss | Tippeligaen | 6 | 0 | 0 | 0 | 6 | 0 |
| 2011 | Hønefoss | Adeccoligaen | 14 | 1 | 1 | 0 | 15 | 1 |
| 2012 | Hønefoss | Tippeligaen | 25 | 1 | 3 | 0 | 28 | 1 |
| 2013 | Hønefoss | Tippeligaen | 24 | 0 | 2 | 0 | 26 | 0 |
| 2014 | Hønefoss | 1. divisjon | 18 | 2 | 0 | 0 | 18 | 2 |
| 2015 | Hønefoss | OBOS-ligaen | 16 | 2 | 1 | 0 | 17 | 2 |
| 2015 | Sarpsborg 08 | Tippeligaen | 11 | 1 | 2 | 0 | 13 | 1 |
| 2016 | Sarpsborg 08 | Tippeligaen | 22 | 1 | 4 | 0 | 26 | 1 |
| 2017 | Sarpsborg 08 | Eliteserien | 4 | 0 | 1 | 0 | 5 | 0 |
| 2018 | Hønefoss | 2.Divisjon | 21 | 2 | 0 | 0 | 21 | 2 |
| Career Total | | | 168 | 10 | 16 | 0 | 184 | 10 |
