= Magnus Hart =

Chinese-born Norwegian footballer (born 1996)

Personal information
- Date of birth: 20 April 1996 (age 30)
- Place of birth: Shanghai, China
- Height: 1.64 m (5 ft 4 1/2 in)
- Position: Midfielder

Team information
- Current team: Drøbak-Frogn

Youth career
- 2008–2012: Drøbak-Frogn
- 2012–2015: Fredrikstad

Senior career*
Years	Team	Apps	(Gls)
2015–2016	Sarpsborg 08	3	(0)
2017	Kvik Halden	12	(2)
2018	Tverrelvdalen	20	(10)
2019	Drøbak-Frogn	9	(0)
2019	Råde	11	(1)
2022	Østsiden	1	(1)
2022–	Drøbak-Frogn	66	(13)
- * Club domestic league appearances and goals as of 8 April 2026

Magnus Hart (simplified Chinese: 马格努斯哈特; traditional Chinese: 馬格努斯哈特; born 20 April 1996) is a Chinese-born, Norwegian footballer.

== Club career ==
Hart signed his first professional contract with Tippeligaen side Sarpsborg 08 in 2016, having made two substitute appearances for the Sarpsborg-based club the previous season. He signed for 2. Divisjon side Kvik Halden in 2017.

== Career statistics ==
=== Club ===
As of 18 May 2021.

Club	Season	League			Cup (Note: Appearances in the Norwegian Football Cup)		Continental		Other		Total	
Club	Season	Division	Apps	Goals	Apps	Goals	Apps	Goals	Apps	Goals	Apps	Goals
Sarpsborg 08	2015	Eliteserien	2	0	0	0	–		0	0	2	0
Sarpsborg 08	2016	Eliteserien	1	0	3	0	–		0	0	4	0
Sarpsborg 08	Total		3	0	3	0	0	0	0	0	6	0
Kvik Halden	2017	3. divisjon	12	2	2	0	–		0	0	14	2
Tverrelvdalen	2018	4. divisjon	20	10	1	0	–		0	0	21	10
Drøbak-Frogn	2019	3. divisjon	9	0	1	0	–		0	0	10	0
Råde IL	2019	4. divisjon	11	1	0	0	–		0	0	11	1
Career total			55	13	7	0	0	0	0	0	62	14
