= Gagandeep Singh Lally =

Norwegian footballer (born 1995)

Personal information
- Date of birth: 8 July 1995 (age 31)
- Position: Midfielder

Youth career
- Askim
- –2013: Vålerenga

Senior career*
Years	Team	Apps	(Gls)
2013–2014	Fredrikstad	0	(0)
2014	Sarpsborg 08	1	(0)
2015	Ullern		
2016	Nordstrand		
2017	Askim		
2018	Christiania		
- * Club domestic league appearances and goals as of 9 April 2016

Gagandeep Singh Lally (born 8 July 1995) is a Norwegian football midfielder who last played for Christiania BK.

== Career ==
Hailing from Askim, he was discovered by Vålerenga in the Norway Cup as a child. He did not make it to Vålerenga's senior team, and returned to Østfold and Fredrikstad FK in August 2013. He featured in the first round of the 2014 Norwegian Football Cup. After a year at Fredrikstad, he went on to neighbors Sarpsborg 08 FF, and made his first-tier debut in September 2014 against Sandnes Ulf. However, he was not retained by Sarpsborg either, so ahead of the 2015 season he joined Ullern IF. After spending most of the 2016 season without a club, he made his debut for fourth-tier club Nordstrand IF in September 2016.
