= Claes Kronberg =

Danish footballer (born 1987)

Personal information
- Full name: Claes Phillip Kronberg
- Date of birth: 19 April 1987 (age 39)
- Place of birth: Nykøbing Falster, Denmark
- Height: 1.77 m (5 ft 10 in)
- Position: Full-back

Team information
- Current team: KÍ Klaksvík
- Number: 32

Youth career
- Nykøbing Falster Alliancen

Senior career*
Years	Team	Apps	(Gls)
2005–2011	Lolland Falster Alliancen	?	(?)
2011–2015	Sarpsborg 08	116	(7)
2016–2018	Viking	78	(4)
2019–2020	Sandnes Ulf	28	(2)
2021–	KÍ Klaksvík	94	(12)
- * Club domestic league appearances and goals as of 26 October 2025

Claes Phillip Kronberg (né Jørgensen) (born 19 April 1987) is a Danish professional footballer who plays as a full-back for KÍ Klaksvík.

== Career ==
Kronberg was born in Nykøbing Falster where he also played for Lolland Falster Alliancen. Kronberg joined Sarpsborg 08 in 2011. He made his debut for Sarpsborg 08 in a 3–1 loss against Lillestrøm.

In July 2013 he changed his surname to Kronberg after he married his girlfriend.

Kronberg joined Viking ahead of the 2016 season. After the 2018 season, Viking did not renew Kronberg's contract and thus he left the club.

On 19 June 2019, Kronberg signed for Sandnes Ulf after training with them for several months. He made his debut for the club the same day when Sandnes Ulf lost 2–1 against his former club Viking in the third round of the 2019 Norwegian Cup.

Kronberg moved to Faroe Islands Premier League club KÍ Klaksvík in February 2021, after ten years in Norway. His tenure with the club witnessed remarkable achievements, playing a pivotal role in their domestic triumphs and historic European feats. Notably, he was part of KÍ becoming first Faroese club to advance to the group stage of a major UEFA-organised European tournament, qualifying for the 2023–24 edition of the UEFA Europa Conference League. Additionally, they secured three consecutive league titles in the 2021, 2022, and 2023 seasons.

== Personal life ==
During his tenure at KÍ Klaksvík in the semi-professional Faroe Islands Premier League, Kronberg balanced his football career with employment at a car dealership.

== Career statistics ==
As of match played 14 December 2023

Appearances and goals by club, season and competition
Club	Season	League			National cup		Europe		Other		Total	
Club	Season	Division	Apps	Goals	Apps	Goals	Apps	Goals	Apps	Goals	Apps	Goals
Sarpsborg 08	2011	Tippeligaen	12	0	0	0	—		—		12	0
Sarpsborg 08	2012	1. divisjon	22	0	3	0	—		—		25	0
Sarpsborg 08	2013	Tippeligaen	29	2	2	1	—		2 (Note: Appearances in Tippeligaen promotion/relegation playoffs)	0	33	3
Sarpsborg 08	2014	Tippeligaen	28	5	6	1	—		—		34	6
Sarpsborg 08	2015	Tippeligaen	25	0	6	0	—		—		31	0
Sarpsborg 08	Total		116	7	17	2	—		2	0	135	9
Viking	2016	Tippeligaen	28	1	1	0	—		—		29	1
Viking	2017	Eliteserien	26	0	2	0	—		—		28	0
Viking	2018	1. divisjon	24	3	1	0	—		—		25	3
Viking	Total		78	4	4	0	—		—		82	4
Sandnes Ulf	2019	1. divisjon	12	1	1	0	—		—		13	1
Sandnes Ulf	2020	1. divisjon	16	1	0	0	—		—		16	1
Sandnes Ulf	Total		28	2	1	0	—		—		29	2
KÍ Klaksvík	2021	Betri deildin	23	4	1	0	2 (Note: Appearances in UEFA Europa Conference League)	0	—		24	4
KÍ Klaksvík	2022	Betri deildin	18	1	3	0	6 (Note: Two appearances in UEFA Champions League, four appearances in UEFA Europa Conference League)	0	—		27	1
KÍ Klaksvík	2023	Betri deildin	21	6	1	0	11 (Note: Six appearances in UEFA Champions League, five appearances in UEFA Europa Conference League)	0	1 (Note: Appearances in Faroe Islands Super Cup)	0	34	6
KÍ Klaksvík	Total		62	11	5	0	19	0	1	0	87	11
Career total			284	24	27	2	19	0	3	0	333	26

== Honours ==
KÍ Klaksvik

- Faroe Islands Premier League: 2021, 2022, 2023
- Faroe Islands Super Cup: 2022, 2023
