= Bojan Zajić =

Serbian footballer

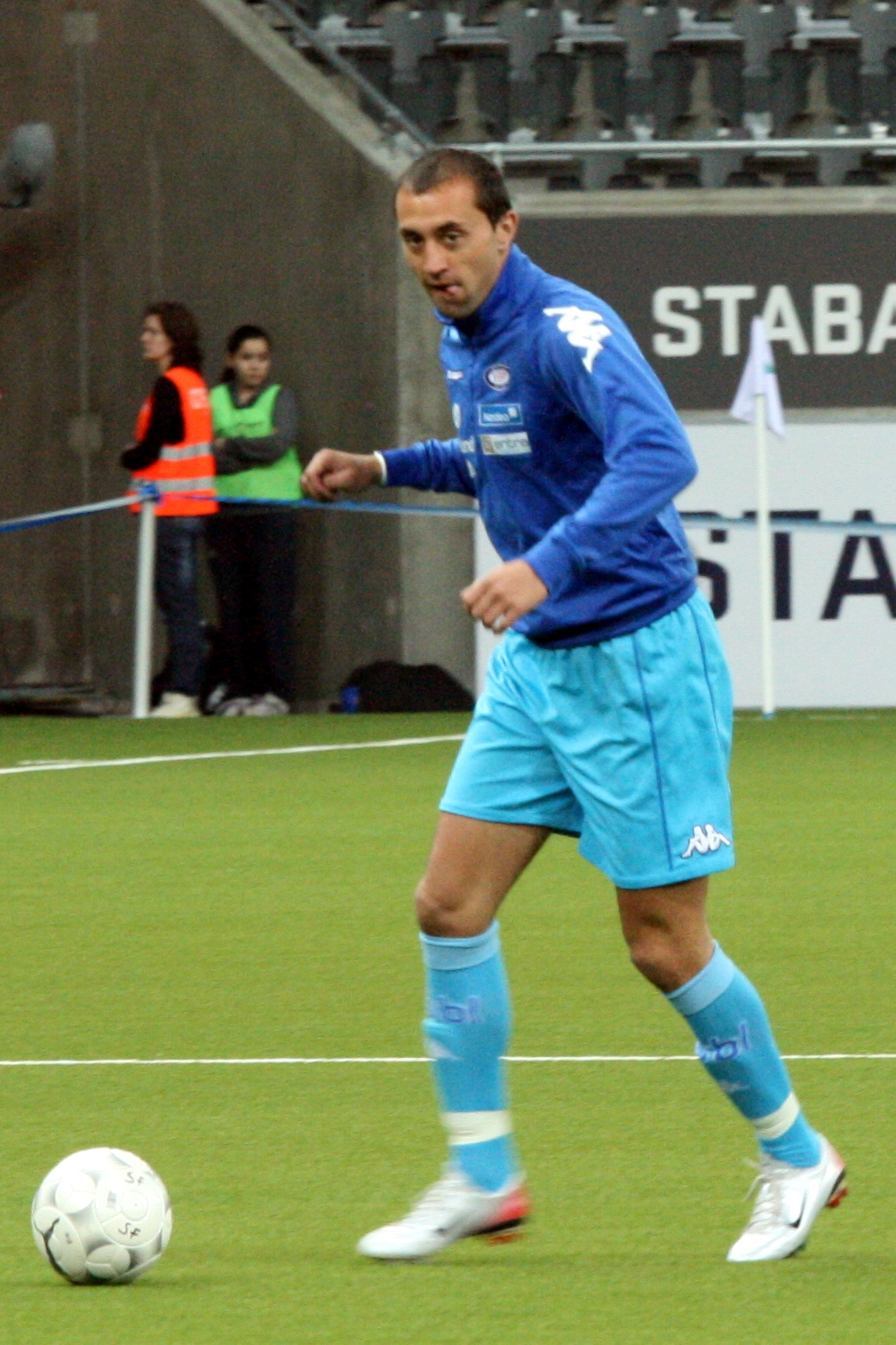
- Zajić with Vålerenga in 2009

Personal information
- Date of birth: 17 June 1980 (age 46)
- Place of birth: Kruševac, SFR Yugoslavia
- Height: 1.88 m (6 ft 2 in)
- Position: Attacking midfielder

Youth career
- Napredak Kruševac

Senior career*
Years	Team	Apps	(Gls)
1998–2001	Napredak Kruševac	70	(18)
2001–2005	Obilić	110	(10)
2006	BASK	14	(2)
2006–2007	Partizan	25	(3)
2007–2013	Vålerenga	143	(26)
2014–2015	Sarpsborg 08	56	(12)
2016–2017	Sandnes Ulf	40	(2)
Total		458	(73)

International career
2004	Serbia and Montenegro	1	(0)
2008	Serbia	1	(0)

Managerial career
- 2017–2023: Sandnes Ulf (assistant)
- 2021: Sandnes Ulf (interim)
- * Club domestic league appearances and goals

Bojan Zajić (Serbian Cyrillic: Бојан Зајић; born 17 June 1980) is a Serbian former professional football coach and former player who is assistant manager of Sandnes Ulf.

== Club career ==
Born in Kruševac, Zajić came through the youth system at his hometown club Napredak, making his senior debut in 1998. He was transferred to Obilić in the summer of 2001. While with the Vitezovi, Zajić made 110 league appearances and scored 10 goals, before leaving due to the club's financial problems in the 2006 winter transfer window. He subsequently joined BASK, playing in the second tier until the end of the 2005–06 season.

On 7 July 2006, Zajić signed a four-year contract with Partizan. He scored a brace in a 4–2 home victory over Groningen in the first leg of the UEFA Cup first round on 14 September 2006. In total, Zajić made 33 appearances and scored six goals across all competitions during the 2006–07 season.

In August 2007, Zajić moved to Norwegian club Vålerenga, on an initial three-month loan. He made seven league appearances and scored once until the end of the season, before signing a permanent contract with the club. In the following years, Zajić became one of the team's most important players, making 170 competitive appearances and scoring 37 goals.

On 6 January 2014, Zajić signed a two-year contract with Sarpsborg 08. He was the club's top scorer in the following two seasons (2014 and 2015). On 18 January 2016, Zajić signed a two-year contract with Sandnes Ulf. He eventually retired from professional football in June 2017, becoming the team's assistant manager.

== International career ==
Zajić played one match for the Serbia and Montenegro national team at the 2004 Kirin Cup against Slovakia. He also made one appearance for the Serbia national team in a friendly match against Poland in December 2008.

== Career statistics ==
=== Club ===
Appearances and goals by club, season and competition
Club	Season	League		Cup		Continental		Total	
Club	Season	Apps	Goals	Apps	Goals	Apps	Goals	Apps	Goals
Napredak Kruševac	1998–99	10	4	0	0	—		10	4
Napredak Kruševac	1999–2000	28	8	5	1	—		33	9
Napredak Kruševac	2000–01	32	6	1	0	4	0	37	6
Napredak Kruševac	Total	70	18	6	1	4	0	80	19
Obilić	2001–02	27	0	2	0	4	0	33	0
Obilić	2002–03	19	2	1	0	2	0	22	2
Obilić	2003–04	24	2			—		24	2
Obilić	2004–05	26	2			—		26	2
Obilić	2005–06	14	4			—		14	4
Obilić	Total	110	10	3	0	6	0	119	10
BASK	2005–06	14	2	0	0	—		14	2
Partizan	2006–07	25	3	1	0	7	3	33	6
Partizan	2007–08	0	0	0	0	1	0	1	0
Partizan	Total	25	3	1	0	8	3	34	6
Vålerenga	2007	7	1	0	0	0	0	7	1
Vålerenga	2008	21	3	6	4	—		27	7
Vålerenga	2009	22	5	6	3	2	0	30	8
Vålerenga	2010	20	4	1	1	—		21	5
Vålerenga	2011	28	8	2	1	4	0	34	9
Vålerenga	2012	26	1	3	1	—		29	2
Vålerenga	2013	19	4	3	1	—		22	5
Vålerenga	Total	143	26	21	11	6	0	170	37
Sarpsborg 08	2014	28	6	5	4	—		33	10
Sarpsborg 08	2015	28	6	6	2	—		34	8
Sarpsborg 08	Total	56	12	11	6	—		67	18
Sandnes Ulf	2016	28	2	3	0	—		31	2
Sandnes Ulf	2017	12	0	2	0	—		14	0
Sandnes Ulf	Total	40	2	5	0	—		45	2
Career total		458	73	47	18	24	3	529	94

=== International ===
Appearances and goals by national team and year
National team	Year	Apps	Goals
Serbia and Montenegro	2004	1	0
Serbia and Montenegro	2005	0	0
Serbia and Montenegro	2006	0	0
Serbia	2006	0	0
Serbia	2007	0	0
Serbia	2008	1	0
Total		2	0

== Honours ==
Vålerenga

- Norwegian Cup: 2008
