= Oliver Feldballe =

Danish footballer (born 1990)

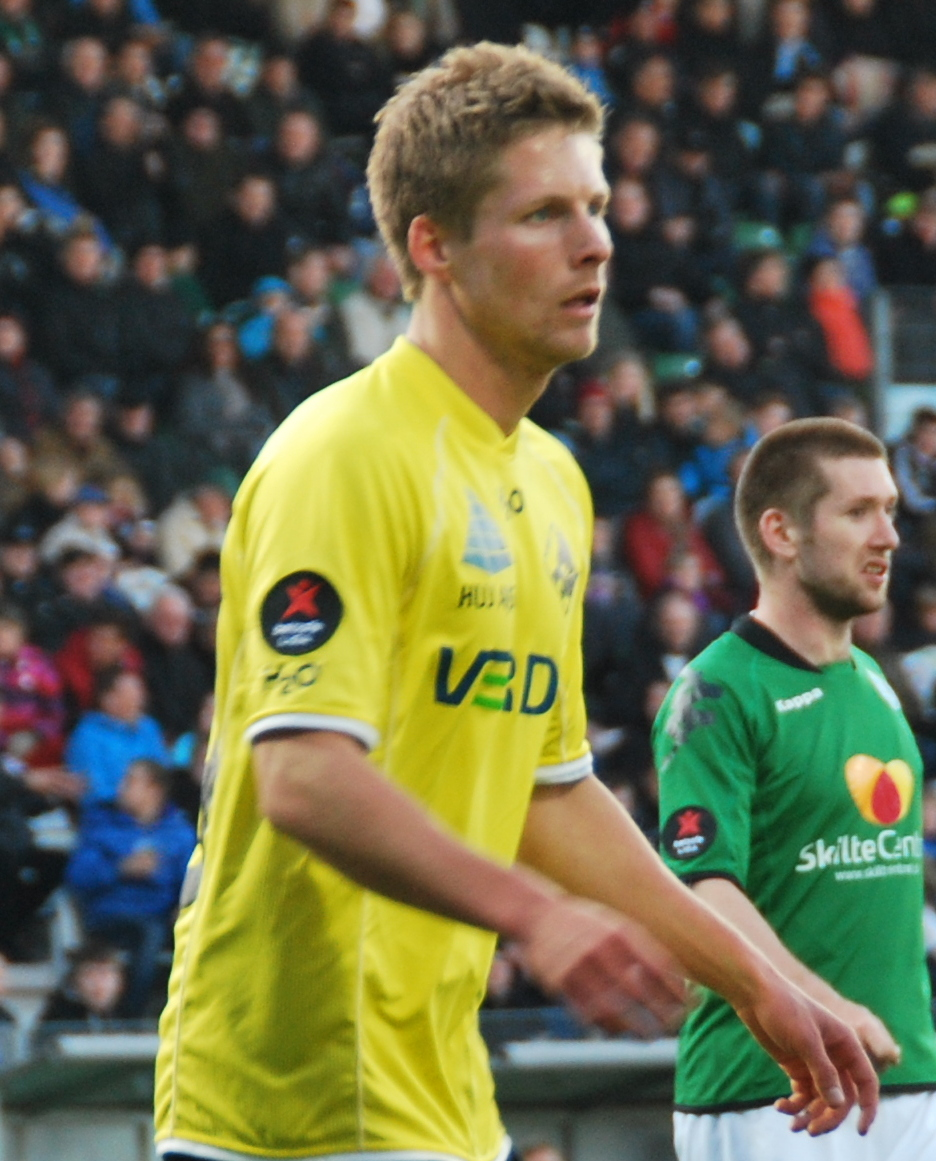

Personal information
- Full name: Nicolai Oliver Feldballe Petersen
- Date of birth: 3 April 1990 (age 36)
- Place of birth: Denmark
- Height: 1.84 m (6 ft 0 in)
- Position: Winger

Youth career
- OB

Senior career*
Years	Team	Apps	(Gls)
2009–2011	OB	31	(0)
2011–2013	Randers	24	(3)
2013–2014	Cambuur	16	(0)
2014–2015	Sarpsborg 08	16	(1)
2015–2017	Fredericia	57	(5)
2017–2018	Marienlyst	26	(2)

International career
	Denmark U-18	4	(1)
	Denmark U-19	13	(1)
	Denmark U-20	3	(0)
- * Club domestic league appearances and goals as of 5 December 2017

Nicolai Oliver Feldballe Petersen (born 3 April 1990) is a Danish former footballer.

== Career ==
A promising winger, Feldballe made his Danish Superliga debut for his youth club OB in August 2009, after having been on trial at the English club Liverpool during his youth. He moved to Randers FC on a free transfer in the summer of 2011. After two seasons, he signed with Eredivisie club SC Cambuur.

In July 2014, Feldballe sign with Norwegian Tippeligaen club Sarpsborg 08.

In July 2015, Feldballe moved to Danish 1st Division (second-tier) club Fredericia. He left the club in the summer 2017.

On 1 August 2017, Feldballe signed with local Odense club, BK Marienlyst, competing in the Danish 2nd Division (third-tier). He retired from football in 2018.
