= Simen Brenne =

Norwegian footballer (born 1981)

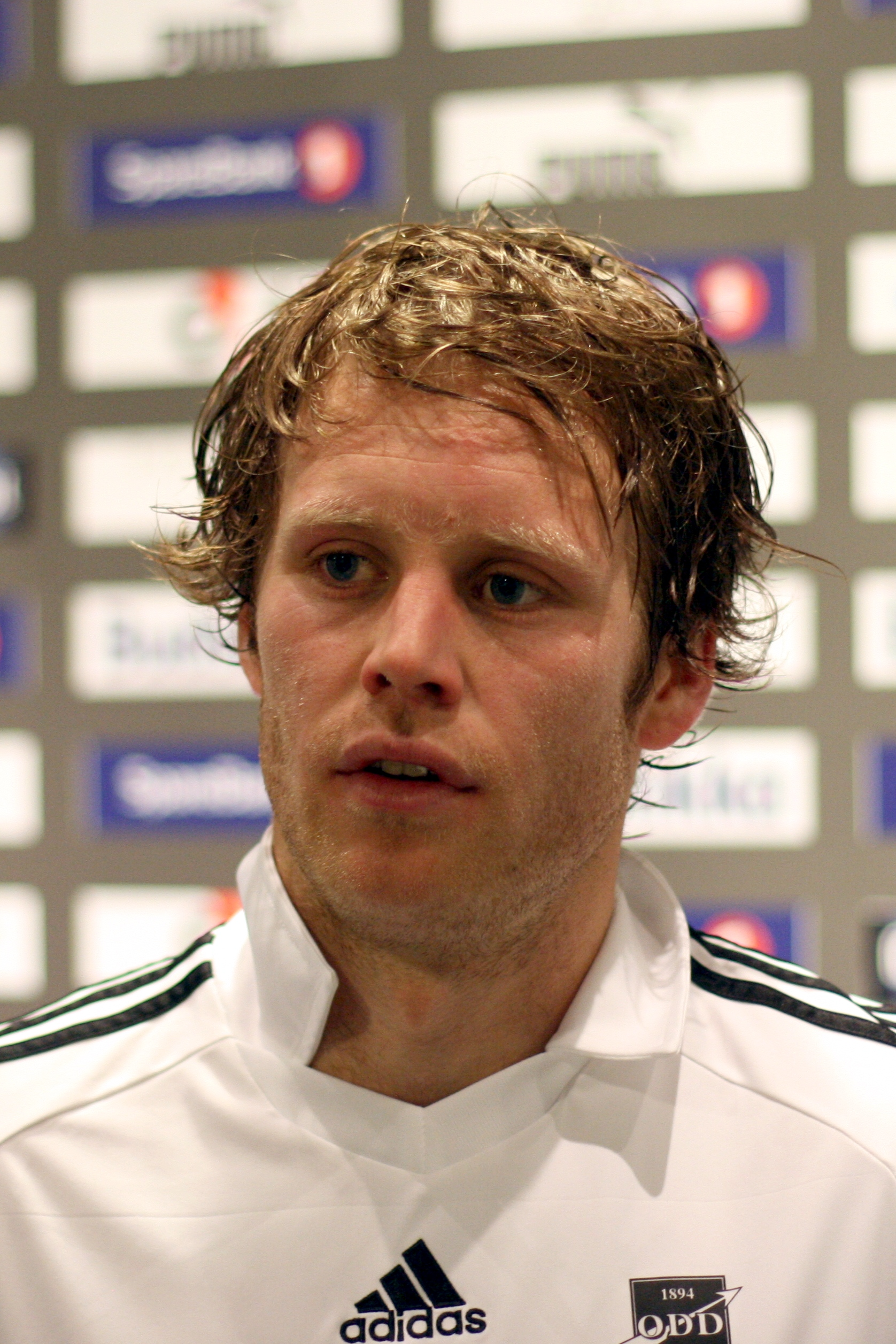
- Simen Brenne in April 2009

Personal information
- Date of birth: 17 March 1981 (age 45)
- Place of birth: Fredrikstad, Norway
- Height: 1.81 m (5 ft 11 in)
- Position: Midfielder

Team information
- Current team: Råde

Youth career
- Skjeberg SK
- –1999: Selbak

Senior career*
Years	Team	Apps	(Gls)
2000–2003	Moss	96	(13)
2004–2006	Fredrikstad	72	(17)
2007–2008	Lillestrøm	43	(5)
2009–2012	Odd Grenland	107	(25)
2013–2014	Strømsgodset	15	(1)
2015	Sarpsborg 08	9	(0)
2016–	Råde		

International career^{‡}
2000–2003	Norway U21	19	(1)
2007–2012	Norway	15	(1)
- * Club domestic league appearances and goals as of 3 November 2016 ‡ National team caps and goals as of 15 January 2012

Simen Brenne (born 17 March 1981) is a Norwegian footballer who plays for Råde. Brenne has played in 15 games for Norway, and scored one goal since his debut in 2007.

== Career statistics ==
As of 3 November 2016

Club	Season	Division	League		Cup		Total	
Club	Season	Division	Apps	Goals	Apps	Goals	Apps	Goals
Moss	2000	Tippeligaen	18	1	2	0	20	1
Moss	2001	Tippeligaen	25	6	3	2	28	8
Moss	2002	Tippeligaen	26	4	4	0	30	4
Moss	2003	Adeccoligaen	27	2	3	0	30	2
Moss	Total		96	13	12	2	108	15
Fredrikstad	2004	Tippeligaen	26	3	0	0	28	3
Fredrikstad	2005	Tippeligaen	21	6	4	0	25	6
Fredrikstad	2006	Tippeligaen	25	8	4	1	29	9
Fredrikstad	Total		72	17	8	1	80	18
Lillestrøm	2007	Tippeligaen	23	4	6	3	29	7
Lillestrøm	2008	Tippeligaen	20	1	1	0	21	1
Lillestrøm	Total		43	5	7	3	50	8
Odd Grenland	2009	Tippeligaen	27	9	3	0	30	9
Odd Grenland	2010	Tippeligaen	28	6	4	1	32	7
Odd Grenland	2011	Tippeligaen	27	5	2	2	29	7
Odd Grenland	2012	Tippeligaen	25	5	2	0	27	5
Odd Grenland	Total		107	25	11	3	118	28
Strømsgodset	2013	Tippeligaen	14	1	0	0	14	1
Strømsgodset	2014	Tippeligaen	1	0	0	0	1	0
Strømsgodset	Total		15	1	0	0	15	1
Sarpsborg 08	2015	Tippeligaen	9	0	2	0	11	0
Sarpsborg 08	Total		9	0	2	0	11	0
Career Total			342	61	40	9	382	70

=== International goals ===
#	Date	Venue	Opponent	Score	Result	Competition
1	28 Mars 2007	Commerzbank-Arena, Frankfurt, Germany	Turkey	0–1	2–2	UEFA European Championship 2008 Qual.

== Honours ==
=== Club ===
Fredrikstad

- Norwegian Football Cup (1): 2006

Lillestrøm

- Norwegian Football Cup (1): 2007

Strømsgodset

- Tippeligaen (1): 2013
