= Lasse Heinze =

Danish footballer (born 1986)

Personal information
- Date of birth: 3 April 1986 (age 40)
- Place of birth: Denmark
- Height: 1.84 m (6 ft 0 in)
- Position: Goalkeeper

Team information
- Current team: FC Midtjylland Academy (goalkeeper coach)

Youth career
- Velling UIF
- Ringkøbing IF
- Ikast FS

Senior career*
Years	Team	Apps	(Gls)
2002–2009	FC Midtjylland	58	(0)
2009	→ Silkeborg IF (loan)	32	(0)
2010–2013	Silkeborg IF	78	(0)
2013–2014	AC Horsens	21	(0)
2014–2015	FC Midtjylland	0	(0)
2015	→ Sarpsborg 08 (loan)	3	(0)

International career
2007–2008	Denmark U-21	4	(0)

Managerial career
- 2015–: FC Midtjylland Academy (goalkeeper coach)
- * Club domestic league appearances and goals

Lasse Heinze (born 3 April 1986) is a Danish professional retired football player, who played as a goalkeeper. He is currently working for FC Midtjylland Academy as goalkeeper coach.

== Career ==
He has played four games for the Danish under-21 national team.

Heinze was included in the FC Midtjylland (FCM) first team squad in 2002, and got his senior debut in the Spring 2005. In the spring 2007, Heinze contended with newly bought Czech goalkeeper Martin Raška for the position of starting goalkeeper. Heinze was initially selected to tend the goal, but following fluctuating performances, FCM manager Erik Rasmussen replaced him with Raška.

== Retirement ==
After several hip-injuries, the keeper decided to retire on 22 November 2015.

== After retiring ==
Only three days after Heinze announced his retirement, he was hired as goalkeeper coach for the FC Midtjylland Academy.
