= Habib Bellaïd =

Algerian footballer (born 1986)

Personal information
- Full name: Habib Mohamed Bellaïd
- Date of birth: 28 March 1986 (age 40)
- Place of birth: Bobigny, France
- Height: 1.89 m (6 ft 2 in)
- Position: Centre-back

Youth career
- 1994–2002: Red Star
- 1999–2002: Clairefontaine
- 2002–2005: Strasbourg

Senior career*
Years	Team	Apps	(Gls)
2005–2008	Strasbourg	78	(2)
2008–2012	Eintracht Frankfurt	23	(0)
2009	→ Strasbourg (loan)	13	(0)
2010	→ Boulogne (loan)	9	(0)
2010–2011	→ Sedan (loan)	22	(0)
2012–2013	Sedan	28	(0)
2013–2014	MC Alger	15	(0)
2014	CS Sfaxien	2	(0)
2015	White Star Bruxelles	6	(1)
2015	Sarpsborg 08	7	(0)
2016–2018	AC Amiens	52	(0)
2018–2019	Sedan	20	(0)
Total		275	(3)

International career
2001–2002	France U16	15	(1)
2002–2003	France U17	14	(0)
2003–2004	France U18	4	(0)
2004–2005	France U19	2	(0)
2006–2008	France U21	16	(2)
2010	Algeria	1	(0)
- * Club domestic league appearances and goals

Habib Mohamed Bellaïd (born 28 March 1986) is a former professional footballer who played as a centre-back. Born in France, he has represented France at youth level and Algeria at senior level.

He was part of the Algeria national squad at the 2010 FIFA World Cup in South Africa.

== Club career ==
=== Early life ===
Bellaïd began his career playing for his local side Red Star Saint-Ouen. During his time as a youth player there, he was teammates with Abou Diaby. In 1999, he was selected to attend the Clairefontaine academy. There, he trained alongside Diaby, Hatem Ben Arfa, and Ricardo Faty and often spent the week training there, while playing with Red Star on the weekends. Following his stint at Clairefontaine, he joined RC Strasbourg.

=== Strasbourg ===
Bellaïd joined Strasbourg in 2002 and quickly asserted himself into the youth academy. He was a part of the Strasbourg youth squad that made it to the finals of the Coupe Gambardella in 2003, before losing to 4–1 to Rennes. He made his professional debut on 9 November 2004 in a Coupe de la Ligue match against Troyes AC starting the match in the left back position. Strasbourg won the match 3–1 and eventually went on to win the cup. That league cup appearance was his only appearance that season.

Bellaïd was subsequently promoted to the senior squad for the 2005–06 season. He proceeded to make his Ligue 1 debut on 17 September 2005 in a match against RC Lens coming on as a substitute in the 70th minute. The match ended in a 1–1 draw. He appeared consistently as a starter for the rest of the season. He scored his first professional goal and only goal that season in the UEFA Cup against Roma at the Stadio Olimpico. Unfortunately for Bellaïd, due to primarily focusing on their European aspirations, Strasbourg finished 2nd from bottom, thus being relegated to Ligue 2. The following season, Strasbourg achieved promotion back to Ligue 1 with Bellaïd playing in 31 matches and scoring two goals. His return to Ligue 1 was both positive and negative as Bellaïd's performances gained the attention of several clubs, most notably Italian side Roma and Spanish giants Real Madrid, but the club still suffered relegation, which led the player to ponder his future.

=== Move to Germany ===
On 4 July 2008, it was announced that Bellaïd and Strasbourg had agreed to a move to German club Eintracht Frankfurt. The player agreed to a four-year contract, while the transfer fee was priced at €2.5 million. He was given the number 19 shirt and made his Bundesliga debut in their opening league match against Hertha Berlin. Eintracht would lose the match 2–0. Bellaïd has since made 21 more appearances in the league.

=== Back to Strasbourg ===
On 31 August 2009, the French defender left Eintracht Frankfurt and signed for RC Strasbourg on loan until the end of the season.

=== Loan to Boulogne ===
After a half-year with his former club RC Strasbourg the club loaned him out to US Boulogne without consulting Eintracht Frankfurt, but at the request of the player Eintracht approved the transfer.

== International career ==
Bellaïd has been a France youth international since childhood receiving caps with all of France's youth teams beginning with the U-15s all the way to the U-21s. He was also eligible to play for Tunisia and Algeria, subject to FIFA approval.

On 4 May 2010, Bellaïd was called up to the Algeria preliminary World Cup 2010 squad. He made his debut on 28 May 2010 as a starter in a friendly against the Republic of Ireland, but did not play in the tournament.

== Personal life ==
Bellaïd was born in Bobigny, France, to a Tunisian father and an Algerian mother. He holds French and Algerian nationalities.
