= Martin Thømt Jensen =

Norwegian footballer (born 1990)

Personal information
- Date of birth: 8 July 1990 (age 36)
- Position: Defender

Team information
- Current team: Østsiden

Youth career
- Vansjø/Svinndal
- Moss

Senior career*
Years	Team	Apps	(Gls)
2007–2012	Moss		
2013–2015	Sarpsborg 08	47	(3)
2016	Fredrikstad	25	(0)
2017–2018	Moss	47	(4)
2019	Sprint-Jeløy	24	(2)
2020–	Østsiden		

International career^{‡}
2007	Norway U17	5	(0)
2008	Norway U18	3	(1)
2008–2009	Norway U19	7	(2)
- * Club domestic league appearances and goals as of 31 May 2020 ‡ National team caps and goals as of 31 May 2020

Kristoffer Hoven (born 8 July 1990) is a Norwegian football defender who currently plays for Østsiden IL.
