= Fredrik Midtsjø =

Norwegian footballer (born 1993)

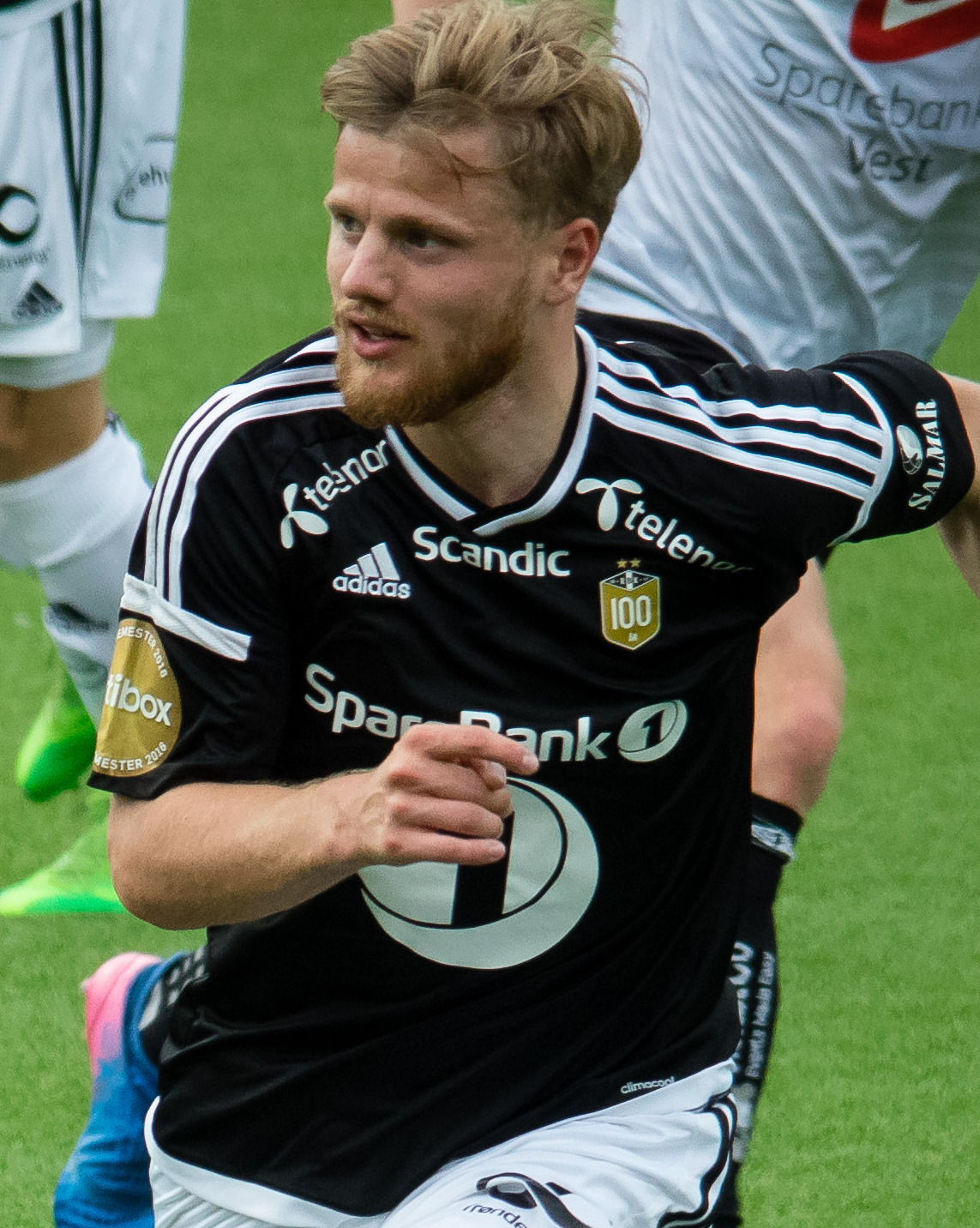
- Midtsjø in 2017

Personal information
- Date of birth: 11 August 1993 (age 33)
- Place of birth: Stjørdal, Norway
- Height: 1.76 m (5 ft 9 in)
- Position: Midfielder

Youth career
- –2007: Stjørdals-Blink
- 2007–2009: Rosenborg

Senior career*
Years	Team	Apps	(Gls)
2010–2017	Rosenborg	96	(12)
2012	→ Ranheim (loan)	10	(0)
2014	→ Sandnes Ulf (loan)	28	(5)
2017	Jong AZ	1	(0)
2017–2022	AZ	148	(5)
2022–2023	Galatasaray	21	(1)
2023–2024	Pendikspor	26	(1)
2024–2025	Eyüpspor	9	(0)

International career^{‡}
2016–2022	Norway	11	(0)
- * Club domestic league appearances and goals as of 8 July 2025 ‡ National team caps and goals as of 4 July 2024

Fredrik Midtsjø (born 11 August 1993) is a Norwegian professional footballer who plays as a midfielder.

Midtsjø began his professional career at Norwegian club Rosenborg in 2010. After loan spells at Ranheim and Sandnes Ulf he became a regular in their team, making 96 league appearances and scoring 12 goals for Rosenborg. He signed for AZ in 2017.

Midtsjø made his full international debut in 2016.

== Club career ==
=== Rosenborg ===
Midtsjø made his debut as a 16-year-old in the Norwegian Cup in May 2010 against his childhood team Stjørdals-Blink. Not long later he officially became a part of the Rosenborg squad. However, during the summer, Rosenborg brought in new players and decided to send him out on loan to local second-tier team, Ranheim for the rest of the season.

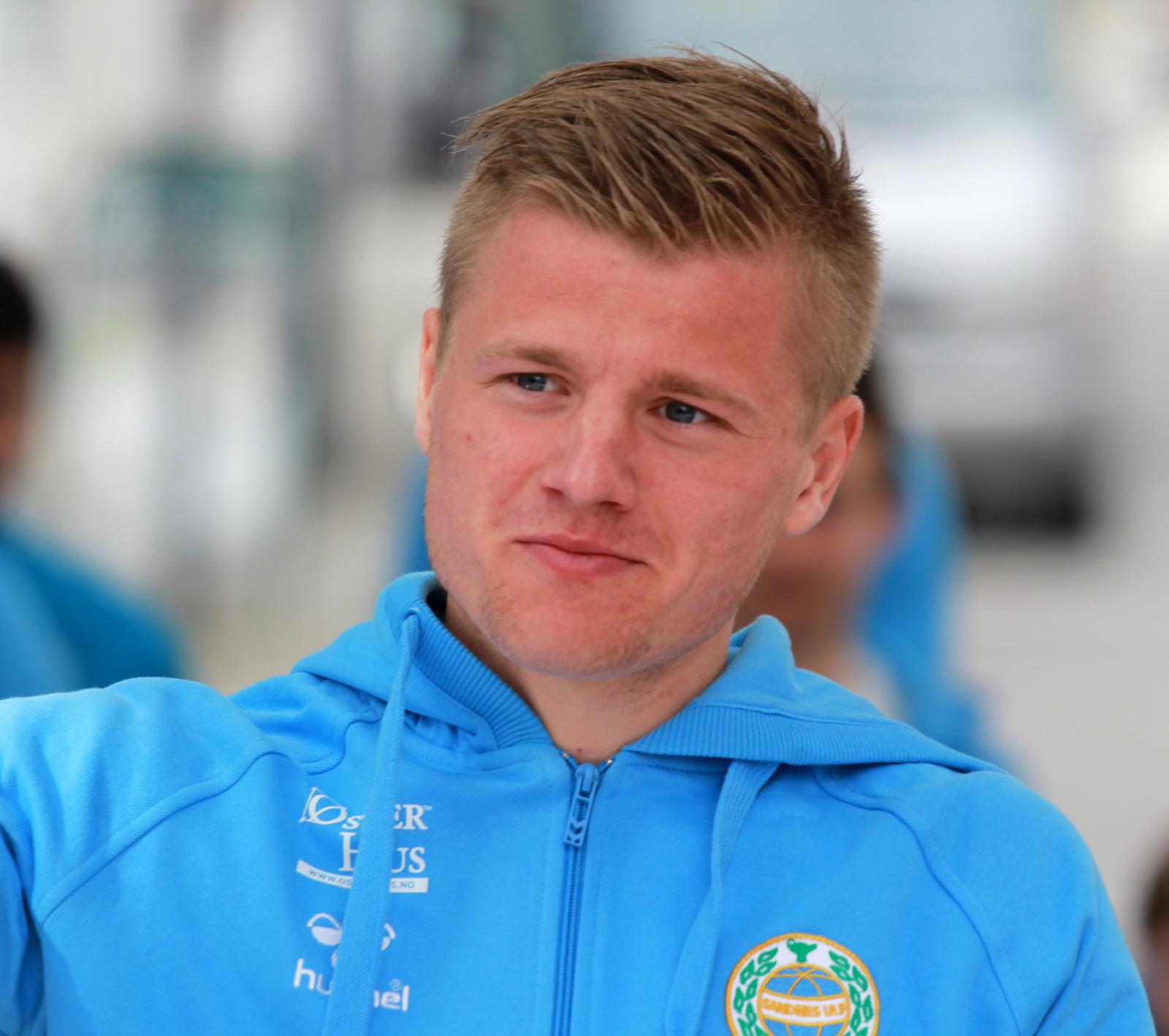
Midtsjø with Sandnes Ulf in 2014

Upon his return, he suffered a broken leg in a game for the second team, keeping him out for 7 months. After recovering from the injury, Rosenborg decided it was best to send him out on loan to another Tippeliga team, Sandnes Ulf for the 2014 season. He made his competitive debut for Sandnes Ulf on 30 March 2014, replacing Steven Lennon in a 1–1 draw against Odd. On 30 April, he scored his first competitive goal for the club, in a 2–1 home win over Stabæk. Midtsjø made a total of 28 appearances for Sandnes Ulf, in which he scored 5 goals as the club suffered relegation to the second division following the 2014 season.

Following the expiration of his loan, Midtsjø returned to Rosenborg and was part of the team for the 2015 season. He signed a new four-year contract with the club on 29 June 2016. On 24 October, he was nominated for the Kniksen Award as best midfielder of the 2016 Tippeligaen, eventually losing out to teammate Mike Jensen.

=== AZ ===
On 26 August 2017, Midtsjø joined Dutch Eredivisie club AZ for an undisclosed fee, signing a five-year contract. He was assigned shirt number 6 by the club.

=== Galatasaray ===
On 2 August 2022, Midtsjø joined Turkish club Galatasaray for a fee of €3.5 million, signing a three-year contract.

He won the Süper Lig in the 2022–23 season with the Galatasaray team, the 23rd championship in the club's history.

=== Pendikspor ===
It was announced that he was transferred to the Süper Lig team Pendikspor on 7 September 2023.

=== Eyüpspor ===
On 1 July 2024 Norwegian media announced that Midsjø has joined the newly promoted club Eyüpspor on a one-year deal.

== International career ==
He made his Norway national football team debut on 24 March 2016 in a friendly against Estonia. He continued to get called up occasionally through 2016 and 2017, and played his second game for his country, and his first as a starter, two years later on 23 March 2018 in a friendly against Australia.

== Career statistics ==
=== Club ===
As of 8 July 2025

Appearances and goals by club, season and competition
Club	Season	League			National cup (Note: Includes Norwegian Cup, KNVB Cup, Turkish Cup)		Continental		Other		Total	
Club	Season	Division	Apps	Goals	Apps	Goals	Apps	Goals	Apps	Goals	Apps	Goals
Rosenborg	2010	Tippeligaen	0	0	1	0	–		–		1	0
Rosenborg	2011	Tippeligaen	6	1	1	0	2 (Note: Appearances in UEFA Champions League)	0	–		9	1
Rosenborg	2012	Tippeligaen	8	1	4	3	2 (Note: Appearances in UEFA Europa League)	0	–		14	4
Rosenborg	2013	Tippeligaen	5	0	3	2	–		–		8	2
Rosenborg	2014	Tippeligaen	0	0	0	0	–		–		0	0
Rosenborg	2015	Tippeligaen	29	4	6	1	13	1	–		48	6
Rosenborg	2016	Tippeligaen	28	4	5	2	6 (Note: Four appearances in UEFA Champions League, two appearances in UEFA Europa League)	0	–		39	6
Rosenborg	2017	Eliteserien	20	2	3	1	6 (Note: Four appearances in UEFA Champions League, two appearances in UEFA Europa League)	0	1	0	30	3
Rosenborg	Total		96	12	23	9	29	1	1	0	149	22
Ranheim (loan)	2012	Adeccoligaen	10	0	0	0	–		–		28	0
Sandnes Ulf (loan)	2014	Tippeligaen	28	5	0	0	–		–		28	5
AZ	2017–18	Eredivisie	29	2	6	0	–		–		35	2
AZ	2018–19	Eredivisie	33	1	4	1	2	0	–		39	2
AZ	2019–20	Eredivisie	23	0	2	0	13	1	–		38	1
AZ	2020–21	Eredivisie	31	2	1	0	8 (Note: Two appearances in UEFA Champions League, six appearances in UEFA Europa League)	0	–		40	2
AZ	2021–22	Eredivisie	29	0	2	0	8 (Note: Two appearances in UEFA Europa League, six appearances in UEFA Europa Conference League)	0	–		39	0
AZ	Total		145	5	15	1	31	1	–		191	7
Galatasaray	2022–23	Süper Lig	21	1	4	0	–		–		25	1
Galatasaray	2023–24	Süper Lig	0	0	0	0	3	1	0	0	3	1
Galatasaray	Total		21	1	4	0	3	1	0	0	28	2
Pendikspor	2023–24	Süper Lig	26	1	1	0	–		–		27	1
Eyüpspor	2024–25	Süper Lig	9	0	0	0	–		–		9	0
Career total			335	24	43	10	63	3	1	0	442	37

=== International ===
As of match played on 6 June 2021

Norway
Year	Apps	Goals
2016	1	0
2017	0	0
2018	2	0
2019	1	0
2020	2	0
2021	5	0
Total	11	0

== Honours ==
Rosenborg

- Norwegian League: 2015, 2016, 2017
- Norwegian Football Cup: 2015, 2016
- Mesterfinalen: 2017
- Norwegian U-19 Championship: 2009, 2011

Galatasaray

- Süper Lig: 2022–23
