= Christian Sukke =

Norwegian footballer (born 1993)

Personal information
- Full name: Christian Kroglund Sukke
- Date of birth: 21 January 1993 (age 33)
- Height: 1.97 m (6 ft 5 1/2 in)
- Position: Goalkeeper

Team information
- Current team: Østsiden

Youth career
- Askim
- Moss
- –2012: Sarpsborg 08

Senior career*
Years	Team	Apps	(Gls)
2012–2015	Sarpsborg 08	9	(0)
2015	→ Sogndal (loan)	6	(0)
2016–2018	Moss	39	(0)
2019	Rolvsøy		
2020–	Østsiden		

International career
2013	Norway U21	1	(0)
- * Club domestic league appearances and goals as of 31 May 2020

Christian Sukke (born 21 January 1993) is a Norwegian footballer who plays as a goalkeeper for Østsiden IL.

He hails from Spydeberg. He played youth football for Askim and Moss before joining Sarpsborg 08. He reached the senior team bench for the first time in 2011, and made his first-team debut in 2013. He signed a professional contract in 2012.

After playing on loan for Sogndal in 2015, he went on to his old youth club Moss ahead of the 2016 season. In 2019 he joined seventh-tier club Rolvsøy, scoring a dozen goals in the #1 jersey. Ahead of the 2020 season he joined Østsiden IL.

== Career statistics ==
As of 31 May 2015

Season	Club	Division	League		Cup		Total	
Season	Club	Division	Apps	Goals	Apps	Goals	Apps	Goals
2013	Sarpsborg 08	Tippeligaen	5	0	0	0	5	0
2014	Sarpsborg 08	Tippeligaen	4	0	1	0	5	0
2015	Sogndal	OBOS-ligaen	6	0	1	0	7	0
Career Total			15	0	2	0	17	0
