= Onyekachi Hope Ugwuadu =

Nigerian footballer

Kachi
Personal information
- Full name: Onyekachi Hope Ugwuadu
- Date of birth: 5 May 1997 (age 29)
- Place of birth: Nigeria
- Height: 1.82 m (5 ft 11 1/2 in)
- Positions: Winger; striker

Team information
- Current team: Pors
- Number: 20

Youth career
- Gee Lec IFA

Senior career*
Years	Team	Apps	(Gls)
2015–2018	Sarpsborg 08	14	(3)
2017	→ Bodø/Glimt (loan)	8	(2)
2017	→ Strømmen (loan)	13	(2)
2018–2019	Sandnes Ulf	47	(12)
2020–2022	Odd	27	(0)
2022	Pors	6	(2)
2023	TB Tvøroyri	12	(0)
2023–	Pors	53	(14)
- * Club domestic league appearances and goals as of 3 November 2025

Onyekachi Hope Ugwuadu (born 5 May 1997), commonly known as Kachi, is a Nigerian professional footballer who plays as either a winger or striker for Pors in 2. divisjon.

== Career ==
=== Club ===
Kachi signed for Sarpsborg 08 in August 2015 from Gee Lec IFA in his native Nigeria.

On 31 March 2017, Kachi joined Norwegian First Division club Bodø/Glimt on loan for the 2017 season.

On 29 July 2022, Kachi joined Saudi Arabian club Al-Taraji.

== Career statistics ==
=== Club ===
As of match played 28 July 2021

Appearances and goals by club, season and competition
Club	Season	League			National Cup		Continental		Other		Total	
Club	Season	Division	Apps	Goals	Apps	Goals	Apps	Goals	Apps	Goals	Apps	Goals
Sarpsborg 08	2015	Tippeligaen	7	2	1	0	-		-		8	2
Sarpsborg 08	2016	Tippeligaen	7	1	0	0	-		-		7	1
Sarpsborg 08	Total		14	3	1	0	-	-	-	-	15	3
Bodø/Glimt (loan)	2017	OBOS-ligaen	8	2	3	2	–		–		11	4
Bodø/Glimt (loan)	Total		8	2	3	2	-	-	-	-	11	4
Strømmen (loan)	2017	OBOS-ligaen	13	2	0	0	–		–		13	2
Strømmen (loan)	Total		13	2	0	0	-	-	-	-	13	2
Sandnes Ulf	2018	OBOS-ligaen	20	2	3	1	–		–		23	3
Sandnes Ulf	2019	OBOS-ligaen	27	10	3	0	–		–		30	10
Sandnes Ulf	Total		47	12	6	1	-	-	-	-	53	13
Odd	2020	Eliteserien	22	0	0	0	–		–		22	0
Odd	2021	Eliteserien	5	0	0	0	–		–		5	0
Odd	Total		27	0	0	0	-	-	-	-	27	0
Career total			109	19	10	3	-	-	-	-	119	22
