= Olav Øby =

Norwegian footballer (born 1994)

Personal information
- Date of birth: 13 October 1994 (age 32)
- Place of birth: Sarpsborg, Norway
- Height: 1.81 m (5 ft 11 in)
- Position: Midfielder

Team information
- Current team: Union Carl Berner
- Number: 2

Youth career
- Sarpsborg 08

Senior career*
Years	Team	Apps	(Gls)
2011–2018	Sarpsborg 08	32	(0)
2015	→ Follo (loan)	9	(0)
2016–2017	→ Strømmen (loan)	44	(5)
2017	→ Kristiansund (loan)	8	(0)
2018	Kongsvinger	28	(6)
2019	KFUM	18	(4)
2019–2020	Kristiansund	3	(0)
2020	KFUM	27	(4)
2021–2022	Fredrikstad	59	(9)
2023	KR	25	(0)
2024	Kjelsås	12	(1)
2024–2025	Sandnes Ulf	17	(1)
2025–	Union Carl Berner	4	(2)
- * Club domestic league appearances and goals as of 19 September 2025

Olav Øby (born 13 October 1994) is a Norwegian football midfielder who currently plays for Union Carl Berner in the Norwegian Fourth Division.

He was born in Sarpsborg, and played for Sarpsborg's youth team ahead of the 2011 season. He made his Norwegian Premier League debut on 26 May 2013 against SK Brann; despite not even being considered a part of the senior squad at the time.

== Career statistics ==
As of match played 6 December 2021

Appearances and goals by club, season and competition
Club	Season	League			National Cup		Other		Total	
Club	Season	Division	Apps	Goals	Apps	Goals	Apps	Goals	Apps	Goals
Sarpsborg 08	2013	Eliteserien	10	0	0	0	2 (Note: Appearances in relegation play-offs)	0	12	0
Sarpsborg 08	2014	Eliteserien	17	0	5	0	—		22	0
Sarpsborg 08	2015	Eliteserien	5	0	4	0	—		9	0
Sarpsborg 08	Total		32	0	9	0	2	0	43	0
Follo (loan)	2015	1. divisjon	9	0	0	0	—		9	0
Strømmen (loan)	2016	1. divisjon	29	3	3	1	—		32	4
Strømmen (loan)	2017	1. divisjon	15	2	1	0	—		16	2
Strømmen (loan)	Total		44	5	4	1	—		48	6
Kristiansund (loan)	2017	Eliteserien	8	0	1	0	—		9	0
Kongsvinger	2018	1. divisjon	28	6	2	0	—		30	6
KFUM	2019	1. divisjon	18	4	3	0	—		21	4
Kristiansund	2019	Eliteserien	3	0	0	0	—		3	0
KFUM	2020	1. divisjon	27	4	—		—		27	4
Fredrikstad	2021	1. divisjon	29	4	2	0	1 (Note: Appearance in promotion play-offs)	0	32	4
Career total			198	23	21	1	3	0	222	24
