= Martin Wiig =

Norwegian footballer (born 1983)

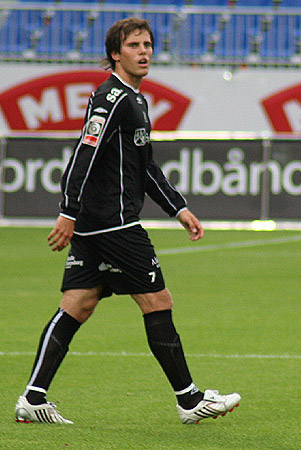

Personal information
- Date of birth: 22 August 1983 (age 43)
- Place of birth: Bodø, Norway
- Height: 1.88 m (6 ft 2 in)
- Position: Forward

Youth career
- Bodø/Glimt
- Urædd

Senior career*
Years	Team	Apps	(Gls)
2000	Urædd	?	(?)
2001–2004	Odd Grenland	60	(15)
2004	→ Sandefjord (loan)	15	(3)
2005–2006	Fredrikstad	31	(5)
2006	→ Sparta Sarpsborg (loan)	10	(1)
2007	Sparta Sarpsborg	25	(9)
2008–2015	Sarpsborg 08	211	(73)
2015–2016	Bodø/Glimt	7	(0)
2016	KFUM Oslo	8	(3)

International career
1999	Norway U16	6	(2)
2000	Norway U17	6	(1)
2001	Norway U18	2	(0)
2002	Norway U19	4	(0)
2002–2005	Norway U21	9	(0)
- * Club domestic league appearances and goals as of 22 September 2016

Martin Wiig (born 22 August 1983) is a retired Norwegian football striker.

== Career ==
Wiig was born in Bodø and spent his youth years in Bodø/Glimt and Urædd, and made his debut in Tippeligaen in 2001 for Odd Grenland, scoring 3 goals in 9 games. He was a first-team regular in 2002 and 2003, but lost his place in 2004 and was loaned out briefly to Sandefjord. in 2005 he joined Fredrikstad, but after a decent debut season there he again lost his place. He joined Sparta Sarpsborg on loan in 2006, a move which was made permanent in 2007, and later continued his career in Sarpsborg 08 after the merge.

In 2012, he became top goalscorer (20) in Adeccoligaen with Sarpsborg 08, and the club advanced yet again to Tippeligaen.

In December 2015 he signed a contract with Bodø/Glimt. In the summer of 2016 he finished his career in KFUM Oslo in the Norwegian First Division.

== Career statistics ==
As of 22 September 2016

Season	Club	Division	League		Cup		Total	
Season	Club	Division	Apps	Goals	Apps	Goals	Apps	Goals
2001	Odd Grenland	Tippeligaen	9	3	2	1	11	4
2002	Odd Grenland	Tippeligaen	25	6	6	4	31	10
2003	Odd Grenland	Tippeligaen	23	6	3	0	26	6
2004	Odd Grenland	Tippeligaen	3	0	0	0	3	0
2004	Sandefjord	Adeccoligaen	15	3	0	0	15	3
2005	Fredrikstad	Tippeligaen	23	5	3	0	26	5
2006	Sparta Sarpsborg (loan)	Adeccoligaen	10	1	0	0	10	1
2006	Fredrikstad	Tippeligaen	8	0	0	0	8	0
2007	Sparta Sarpsborg	Adeccoligaen	25	9	0	0	25	9
2008	Sarpsborg 08	Adeccoligaen	28	13	1	2	29	15
2009	Sarpsborg 08	Adeccoligaen	30	15	0	0	30	15
2010	Sarpsborg 08	Adeccoligaen	28	7	2	2	30	9
2011	Sarpsborg 08	Tippeligaen	27	4	4	3	31	7
2012	Sarpsborg 08	Adeccoligaen	27	20	3	1	30	21
2013	Sarpsborg 08	Tippeligaen	29	6	2	0	31	6
2014	Sarpsborg 08	Tippeligaen	22	3	3	2	25	5
2015	Sarpsborg 08	Tippeligaen	20	5	3	0	23	5
2016	Bodø/Glimt	Tippeligaen	7	0	1	2	8	2
2016	KFUM Oslo	OBOS-ligaen	8	3	0	0	8	3
Career Total			367	109	33	17	400	126

== Honours ==
Individual

- Adeccoligaen top scorer: 2012
