= Duwayne Kerr =

Jamaican international footballer (born 1987)

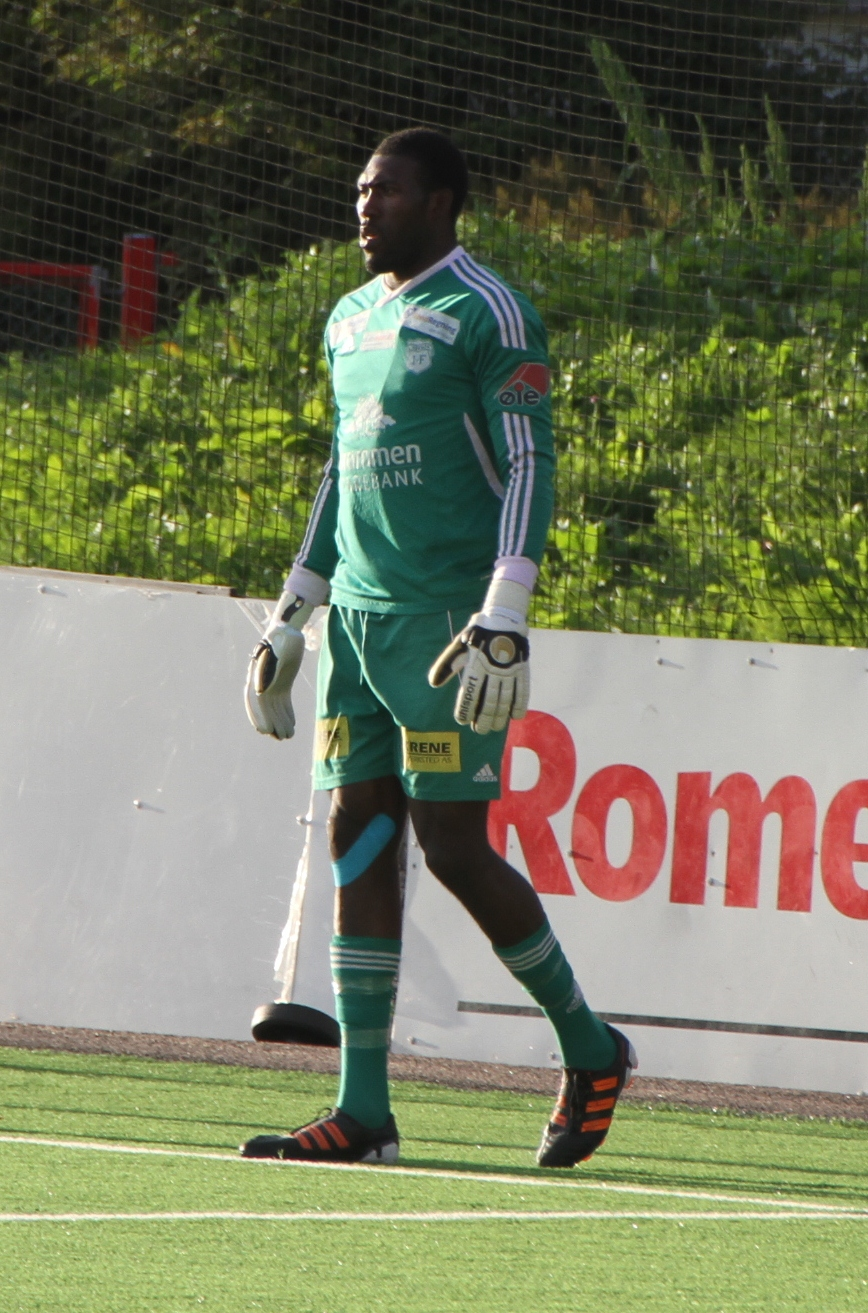

Personal information
- Full name: Duwayne Oriel Kerr
- Date of birth: 16 January 1987 (age 39)
- Place of birth: Westmoreland, Jamaica
- Position: Goalkeeper

Senior career*
Years	Team	Apps	(Gls)
2005–2007	Reno		
2007–2011	Portmore United		
2011–2012	Strømmen	35	(0)
2013–2015	Sarpsborg 08	69	(0)
2016	Stjarnan	14	(0)
2016	Chennaiyin	5	(0)

International career
2007–2016	Jamaica	15	(0)
- * Club domestic league appearances and goals

Duwayne Oriel Kerr (born 16 January 1987) is a Jamaican former international footballer who played as a goalkeeper.

== Club career ==
Kerr has played club football in Jamaica for Reno and Portmore United.

Kerr moved to Norway in 2011, and played two seasons for the Norwegian First Division side Strømmen, and was the best goalkeeper in the 2012 Norwegian First Division according to Sarpsborg 08's Director of Sports, Thomas Berntsen. Kerr joined the newly promoted Tippeligaen side Sarpsborg 08 as a free agent of the 2013-season, and signed a two-year contract with the club.

In April 2016 he signed for Icelandic club Stjarnan. In August 2016, Kerr signed for Chennaiyin FC in the Indian Super League.

=== International career ===
Kerr made his international debut for Jamaica in 2007.

== International statistics ==
As of match played 9 June 2016

Jamaica national team
Year	Apps	Goals
2007	1	0
2008	1	0
2009	2	0
2010	1	0
2011	1	0
2012	1	0
2013	2	0
2014	0	0
2015	4	0
2016	2	0
Total	15	0
