= Ole Christoffer Heieren Hansen =

Norwegian footballer (born 1987)

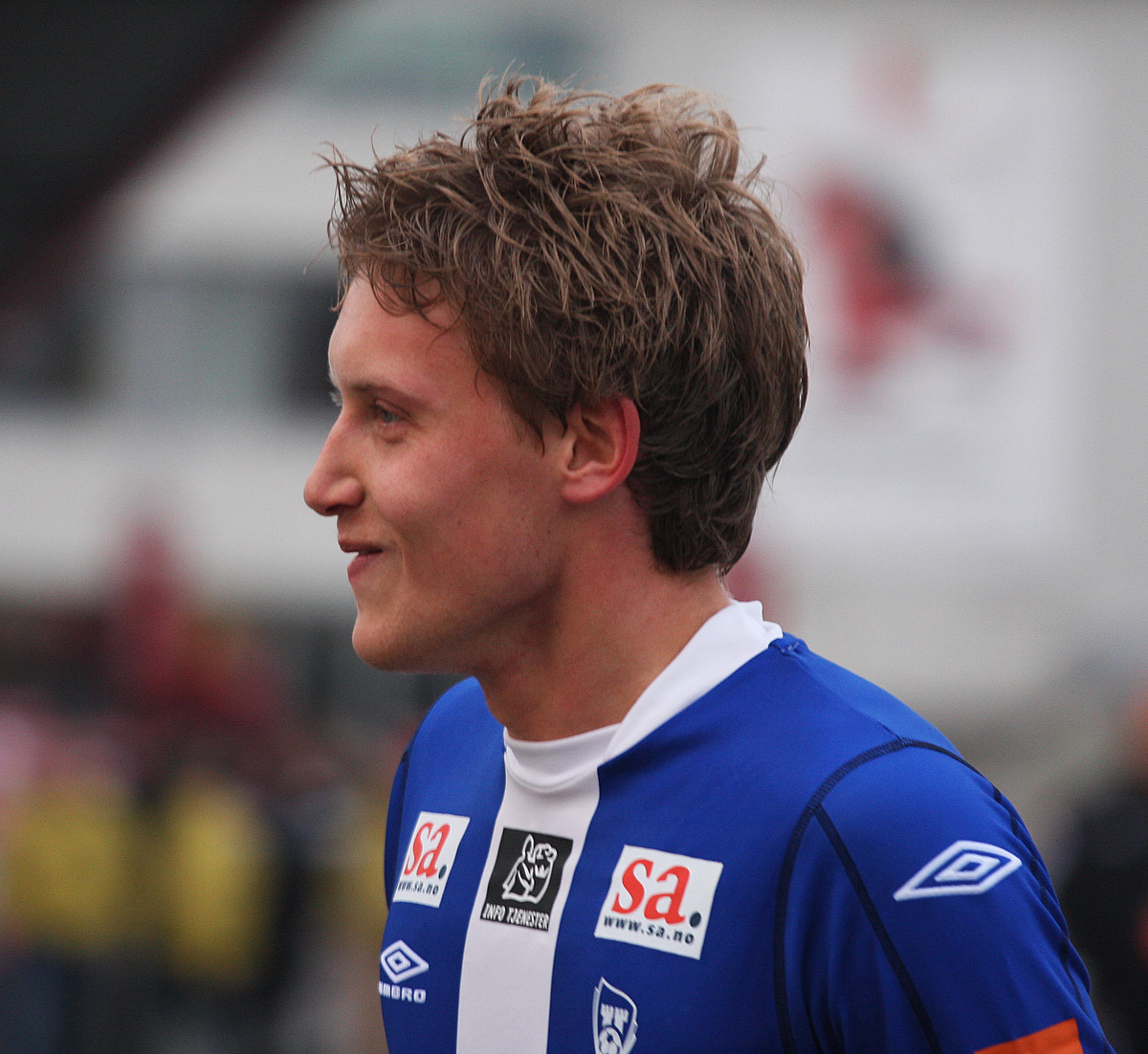

Personal information
- Date of birth: 26 February 1987 (age 39)
- Place of birth: Fredrikstad, Norway
- Height: 1.90 m (6 ft 3 in)
- Position: Defender

Team information
- Current team: Kråkerøy

Senior career*
Years	Team	Apps	(Gls)
2006–2017	Sarpsborg 08	278	(10)
2018–	Kråkerøy		
- * Club domestic league appearances and goals as of 3 November 2016

Ole Christoffer Heieren Hansen (born 26 February 1987) is a Norwegian footballer who plays as a defender for Kråkerøy.

Heieren Hansen was born in Fredrikstad.

== Career statistics ==
As of 26 May 2017

Season	Club	Division	League		Cup		Total	
Season	Club	Division	Apps	Goals	Apps	Goals	Apps	Goals
2006	Sarpsborg 08	Adeccoligaen	25	1	0	0	25	1
2007	Sarpsborg 08	Adeccoligaen	25	3	0	0	25	3
2008	Sarpsborg 08	Adeccoligaen	24	2	1	0	25	2
2009	Sarpsborg 08	Adeccoligaen	30	0	0	0	30	0
2010	Sarpsborg 08	Adeccoligaen	27	0	1	0	28	0
2011	Sarpsborg 08	Tippeligaen	29	1	4	0	33	1
2012	Sarpsborg 08	Adeccoligaen	28	0	3	0	31	0
2013	Sarpsborg 08	Tippeligaen	24	0	2	0	26	0
2014	Sarpsborg 08	Tippeligaen	26	0	5	0	31	0
2015	Sarpsborg 08	Tippeligaen	26	3	3	0	29	3
2016	Sarpsborg 08	Tippeligaen	14	0	4	1	18	1
2017	Sarpsborg 08	Eliteserien	0	0	2	0	2	0
Career Total			278	10	25	1	303	11
