= Kristoffer Tokstad =

Norwegian footballer (born 1991)

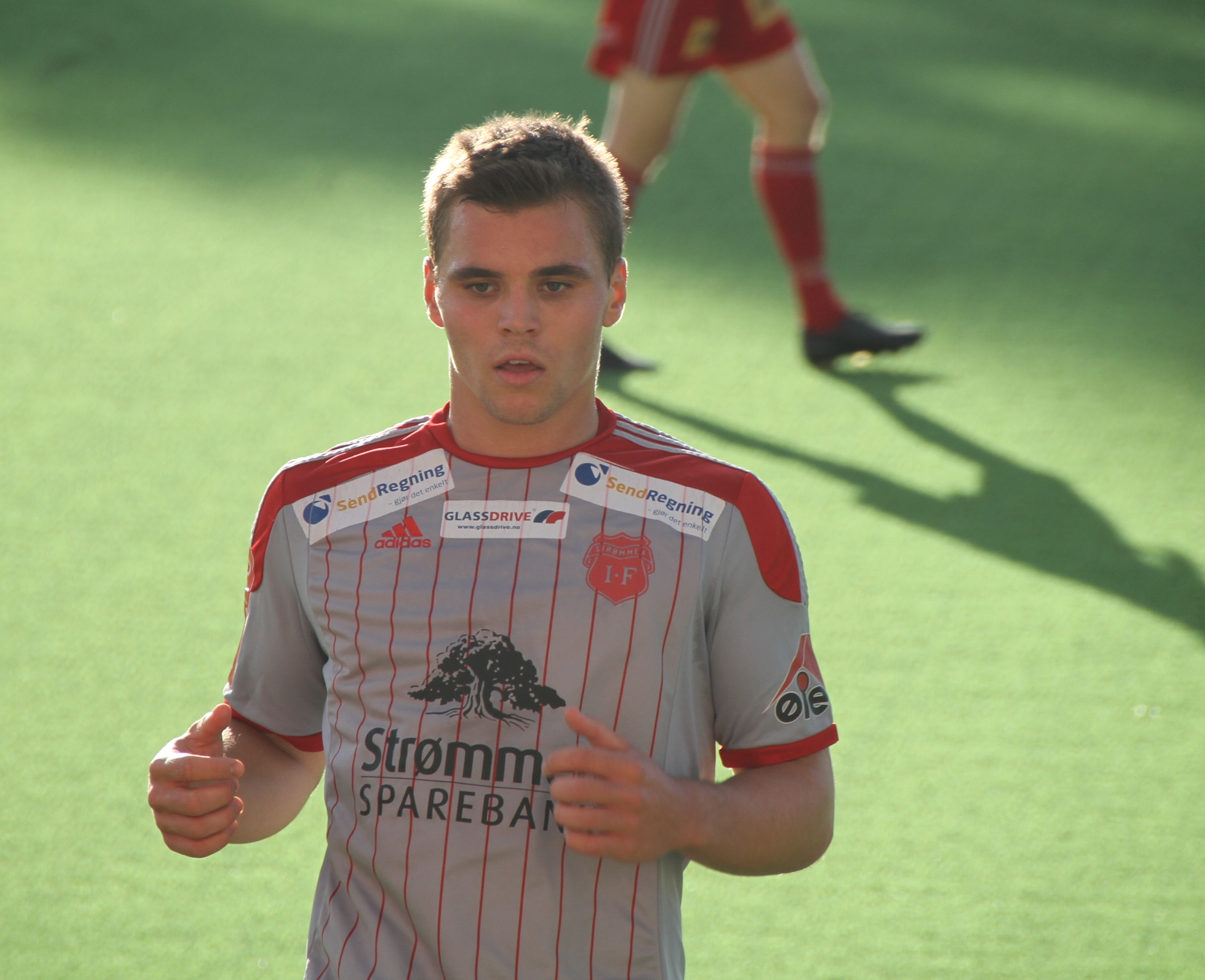

Personal information
- Full name: Kristoffer Tokstad
- Date of birth: 5 July 1991 (age 35)
- Place of birth: Lørenskog, Norway
- Position: Midfielder

Youth career
- –2007: Lørenskog
- 2007–2008: Lillestrøm

Senior career*
Years	Team	Apps	(Gls)
2009–2011	Lillestrøm	16	(0)
2011	→ Strømmen (loan)	9	(1)
2012–2013	Strømmen	45	(12)
2014–2016	Sarpsborg 08	73	(11)
2016–2023	Strømsgodset	139	(12)
2023–2024	Mjøndalen	32	(2)
- * Club domestic league appearances and goals as of 14 November 2024

Kristoffer Tokstad (born 5 July 1991) is a Norwegian professional footballer. The last club he played for was Norwegian First Division club Mjøndalen.

== Career ==
Before transferring to Lillestrøm he played youth football for Lørenskog IF. He signed for Lillestrøm SK in mid-season 2007, was immediately loaned out to Lørenskog again. He returned to Lillestrøm, and ahead of the 2009 season he played several friendly matches. He made his senior debut in June 2009, and played 10 matches in the 2009 season and 3 matches in the 2010 season. In the 2011 season he was loaned out to Strømmen IF.

In 2014, he joined Sarpsborg 08.

On the last day of the Norwegian summer transfer window 2016, he joined Strømsgodset Toppfotball.

In February 2023, Tokstad signed for Mjøndalen for the 2023 season.

== Career statistics ==
=== Club ===
As of match played 25 May 2022

Appearances and goals by club, season and competition
Club	Season	League			National Cup		Europe		Total	
Club	Season	Division	Apps	Goals	Apps	Goals	Apps	Goals	Apps	Goals
Lillestrøm	2009	Tippeligaen	10	0	2	0	-		12	0
Lillestrøm	2010	Tippeligaen	3	0	2	1	-		5	1
Lillestrøm	2011	Tippeligaen	3	0	0	0	-		3	0
Lillestrøm	Total		16	0	4	1	-	-	20	1
Strømmen (loan)	2011	Adeccoligaen	9	1	2	0	-		11	1
Strømmen	2012	Adeccoligaen	30	9	1	0	-		31	9
Strømmen	2013	Adeccoligaen	15	3	0	0	-		15	3
Strømmen	Total		54	13	3	0	-	-	57	13
Sarpsborg 08	2014	Tippeligaen	27	4	5	2	-		32	6
Sarpsborg 08	2015	Tippeligaen	26	3	6	0	-		32	3
Sarpsborg 08	2016	Tippeligaen	20	4	3	1	-		23	5
Sarpsborg 08	Total		73	11	14	3	-	-	87	14
Strømsgodset	2016	Tippeligaen	9	1	2	1	-		11	2
Strømsgodset	2017	Eliteserien	27	1	1	0	-		28	1
Strømsgodset	2018	Eliteserien	14	1	7	1	-		21	2
Strømsgodset	2019	Eliteserien	21	3	1	0	-		22	3
Strømsgodset	2020	Eliteserien	28	2	0	0	-		28	2
Strømsgodset	2021	Eliteserien	19	3	3	0	-		22	3
Strømsgodset	2022	Eliteserien	9	0	4	0	-		13	0
Strømsgodset	Total		127	11	18	2	-	-	145	13
Career total			260	34	39	6	-	-	309	40
