= 2013 Sarpsborg 08 FF season =

Sarpsborg 08
2013 season
- Chairman: Hans Petter Arnesen
- Manager: Brian Deane
- Stadium: Sarpsborg Stadion
- Tippeligaen: 14th
- Norwegian Cup: Second Round vs Kvik Halden
- Top goalscorer: League: Martin Wiig & Mohamed Elyounoussi (6); All: Mohamed Elyounoussi (8)
- Highest home attendance: 4,823 vs Rosenborg (29 September 2013)
- Lowest home attendance: 3,061 vs Haugesund (1 September 2013)
- Average home league attendance: 3,689
Home colours	Away colours	Third colours

The 2013 season was Sarpsborg 08's 2nd season in Tippeligaen, following their promotion back to the top level in 2012. It was also their first season with Brian Deane as the club's manager. Sarpsborg 08 competed in the Tippeligaen, finishing 14th, entering the Relegation play-offs in which they defeated Ranheim 3-0 over two legs. They also competed in the cup where they reached the Second Round, losing to Kvik Halden of the 2. divisjon.

== Squad ==
As of 18 September 2013.

Note: Flags indicate national team as defined under FIFA eligibility rules; some limited exceptions apply. Players may hold more than one non-FIFA nationality.

No.	Pos.	Nation	Player
3	DF	ESP	Álvaro Baigorri
4	DF	NOR	Kjetil Berge
5	MF	ISL	Þórarinn Ingi Valdimarsson (on loan from ÍBV)
6	DF	NOR	Christian Brink
7	FW	NOR	Martin Wiig
8	MF	ISL	Guðmundur Þórarinsson
9	DF	NOR	Berat Jusufi
12	MF	NOR	Olav Øby
13	DF	NOR	Ole Christoffer Heieren Hansen (captain)
14	MF	NOR	Badr Rahhaoui
15	DF	NOR	Sindre Wormdahl
16	MF	NOR	Thomas Aaram
17	MF	DEN	Steffen Ernemann

No.	Pos.	Nation	Player
20	FW	NOR	Magnus Sylling Olsen
22	MF	DEN	Claes Kronberg
23	MF	NOR	Tom Erik Breive
24	FW	NOR	Mohamed Elyounoussi
25	MF	NOR	Martin Hoel Andersen
26	DF	NOR	Martin Thømt Jensen
27	GK	JAM	Duwayne Kerr
28	DF	FRA	Derek Decamps (on loan from Angers)
31	GK	NOR	Christian Sukke
41	GK	NOR	Sondre Aasbø
69	DF	FRA	Jérémy Berthod
99	FW	NGR	Aaron Samuel Olanare

== Transfers ==
=== Winter ===
In: Note: Flags indicate national team as defined under FIFA eligibility rules; some limited exceptions apply. Players may hold more than one non-FIFA nationality.

No.	Pos.	Nation	Player
5	MF	ISL	Þórarinn Ingi Valdimarsson (loan from (Iceland) ÍBV)
17	MF	ISL	Ásgeir Börkur Ásgeirsson (loan from (Iceland) Fylkir)
27	GK	JAM	Duwayne Kerr (from (Norway) Strømmen)
69	DF	FRA	Jérémy Berthod (from (France) Auxerre)

Out: Note: Flags indicate national team as defined under FIFA eligibility rules; some limited exceptions apply. Players may hold more than one non-FIFA nationality.

No.	Pos.	Nation	Player
8	MF	NOR	Morten Giæver (to (Norway) Ull/Kisa)
14	MF	MNE	Mehmed Divanović (to (Montenegro) FK Mornar)
17	MF	NOR	Erik Jonvik
18	MF	NOR	Nicolay Solberg (loan return to (Norway) Lillestrøm)
25	FW	NOR	Glenn Roberts
27	GK	NOR	Frode Larsen (to (Norway) Follo)
34	MF	NGR	Stanley Ihugba (to (Norway) Ull/Kisa)

=== Summer ===
In: Note: Flags indicate national team as defined under FIFA eligibility rules; some limited exceptions apply. Players may hold more than one non-FIFA nationality.

No.	Pos.	Nation	Player
17	MF	DEN	Steffen Ernemann (from (Denmark) Esbjerg)
28	DF	FRA	Derek Decamps (on loan from (France) Angers)
99	FW	NGR	Aaron Samuel Olanare (from (Norway) Vålerenga)

Out: Note: Flags indicate national team as defined under FIFA eligibility rules; some limited exceptions apply. Players may hold more than one non-FIFA nationality.

No.	Pos.	Nation	Player
1	GK	ISL	Haraldur Björnsson (loan to (Norway) Fredrikstad)
10	MF	NOR	Michael Røn
11	FW	NOR	Øyvind Hoås (to (Norway) Hønefoss)
17	MF	ISL	Ásgeir Börkur Ásgeirsson (loan return to (Iceland) Fylkir)
19	MF	NOR	Mathias Engebretsen (loan to (Norway) Moss)
21	MF	NOR	Tobias Henanger (loan to (Norway) Østsiden)

== Competitions ==
=== Tippeligaen ===
==== Results summary ====
Overall								Home						Away					
Pld	W	D	L	GF	GA	GD	Pts	W	D	L	GF	GA	GD	W	D	L	GF	GA	GD
30	8	7	15	40	58	−18	31	7	2	6	23	22	+1	1	5	9	17	36	−19

Last updated: 12 November 2013.
Source: see below

==== Results by round ====
Round	1	2	3	4	5	6	7	8	9	10	11	12	13	14	15	16	17	18	19	20	21	22	23	24	25	26	27	28	29	30
Ground	A	H	A	H	A	H	A	H	A	A	H	A	H	A	H	H	A	H	A	H	A	H	A	H	H	A	H	A	H	A
Result	D	W	D	L	D	D	W	W	L	L	D	L	W	L	L	L	L	L	L	L	L	W	L	W	L	D	W	D	W	L
Position	7	4	6	9	10	11	8	5	8	8	9	10	9	10	12	13	14	14	15	15	16	16	16	16	16	16	15	15	14	14

Updated to match(es) played on 12 November 2013. Source: see below
A = Away; H = Home; W = Win; D = Draw; L = Loss

==== Results ====
17 March 2013 1	Lillestrøm	2–2	Sarpsborg 08	Lillestrøm
15:30 CET (UTC+1)	Moen 62' (pen.); Helstad 65'	Summary	Elyounoussi 7', 60'	Stadium: Åråsen Stadion; Attendance: 4,789; Referee: Ken Henry Johnsen

1 April 2013 2	Sarpsborg 08	2–1	Viking	Sarpsborg
18:00 CEST (UTC+2)	Brink 42'; Wiig 55'	Summary	Böðvarsson 52'	Stadium: Sarpsborg Stadion; Attendance: 4,562; Referee: Per Ivar Staberg

7 April 2013 3	Strømsgodset	1–1	Sarpsborg 08	Drammen
15:30 CEST (UTC+2)	Vilsvik 12'	Summary	Elyounoussi 115'	Stadium: Marienlyst Stadion; Attendance: 5,780; Referee: Tom Harald Hagen

14 April 2013 4	Sarpsborg 08	0–2	Aalesund	Sarpsborg
15:30 CEST (UTC+2)		Summary	Hamdallah 44'; James 81'	Stadium: Sarpsborg Stadion; Attendance: 4,017; Referee: Brage Sandmoen

21 April 2013 5	Sogndal	0–0	Sarpsborg 08	Sogndalsfjøra
18:00 CET (UTC+1)		Summary	Breive (red card) 40'	Stadium: Fosshaugane Campus; Attendance: 2,418; Referee: Ola Hobber Nilsen

28 April 2013 6	Sarpsborg 08	1–1	Hønefoss	Sarpsborg
18:00 CEST (UTC+2)	Wiig 38'	Summary	Riski 74'	Stadium: Sarpsborg Stadion; Attendance: 3,684; Referee: Tom Harald Hagen

5 May 2013 7	Haugesund	0–1	Sarpsborg 08	Haugesund
18:00 CEST (UTC+2)		Summary	Olsen 85'	Stadium: Haugesund Stadion; Attendance: 4,268; Referee: Dag Vidar Hafsås

9 May 2013 8	Sarpsborg 08	3–2	Sandnes Ulf	Sarpsborg
18:00 CET (UTC+1)	Þórarinsson 54'; Olsen 60'; Berthod 64'	Summary	Høiland 22', 57'	Stadium: Sarpsborg Stadion; Attendance: 3,174; Referee: Kristoffer Helgerud

12 May 2013 9	Tromsø	5–0	Sarpsborg 08	Tromsø
18:00 CEST (UTC+2)	Andersen 26'; Johansen 49', 77'; Ondrášek 63'; Nystrøm 90'	Summary		Stadium: Alfheim Stadion; Attendance: 4,266; Referee: Tore Hansen

16 May 2013 10	Rosenborg	4–2	Sarpsborg 08	Trondheim
19:00 CET (UTC+2)	Nielsen 33', 34', 88' (pen.); Elyounoussi 84'	Summary	Olsen 52'; Þórarinsson 65'	Stadium: Lerkendal Stadion; Attendance: 19,015; Referee: Espen Berntsen

21 May 2013 11	Sarpsborg 08	3–3	Vålerenga	Sarpsborg
18:30 CEST (UTC+2)	Valdimarsson 38'; Þórarinsson 60'; Berthod 90+2'	Summary	Berre 6', 45+1'; Holm 68'	Stadium: Sarpsborg Stadion; Attendance: 3,669; Referee: Ken Henry Johnsen

26 May 2013 12	Brann	3–1	Sarpsborg 08	Bergen
19:00 CEST (UTC+2)	Pusic 20'; Finne 45'; Korcsmár 81'	Summary	Wiig 64'	Stadium: Brann Stadion; Attendance: 10,257; Referee: Tore Hansen

22 June 2013 13	Sarpsborg 08	2–1	Start	Sarpsborg
15:30 CEST (UTC+2)	Hoås 9'; Brink 47'	Summary	Asante 53'	Stadium: Sarpsborg Stadion; Attendance: 3,336; Referee: Tommy Skjerven

29 June 2013 14	Molde	3–1	Sarpsborg 08	Molde
15:30 CEST (UTC+2)	Linnes 45+1'; Chima 67'; Tripic 90'	Summary	Berthod 27'	Stadium: Aker Stadion; Attendance: 8,732; Referee: Trygve Kjensli

7 July 2013 15	Sarpsborg 08	0–1	Odd	Sarpsborg
18:00 CEST (UTC+2)		Summary	Johnsen 51'	Stadium: Sarpsborg Stadion; Attendance: 3,760; Referee: Omar Rafiq

14 July 2013 16	Sarpsborg 08	0–1	Lillestrøm	Sarpsborg
18:00 CEST (UTC+2)		Summary	Gulbrandsen 75'	Stadium: Sarpsborg Stadion; Attendance: 3,887; Referee: Tom Harald Hagen

29 July 2013 17	Vålerenga	5–3	Sarpsborg 08	Oslo
19:00 CEST (UTC+2)	Børven 4', 49'; Zajić 27'; Høgh 71'; Berre 82'	Summary	Breive 40'; González 61' (o.g.); Wiig 78'	Stadium: Ullevaal Stadion; Attendance: 12,525; Referee: Espen Berntsen

4 August 2013 18	Sarpsborg 08	2–4	Strømsgodset	Sarpsborg
15:30 CEST (UTC+2)	Breive 33'; Olanare 54'	Summary	Brenne 3'; Diomande 45'; Storbæk 55'; Adjei-Boateng 83'	Stadium: Sarpsborg Stadion; Attendance: 3,620; Referee: Trond Ivar Døvle

11 August 2013 19	Aalesund	3–1	Sarpsborg 08	Ålesund
15:30 CEST (UTC+2)	Hamdallah 29'; Matland 58'; Ulvestad 77'	Summary	Skagestad 88' (o.g.)	Stadium: Color Line Stadion; Attendance: 8,666; Referee: Dag Vidar Hafsås

18 August 2013 20	Sarpsborg 08	0–1	Sogndal	Sarpsborg
18:00 CET (UTC+1)		Summary	Sagna 33'	Stadium: Sarpsborg Stadion; Attendance: 3,647; Referee: Brage Sandmoen

25 August 2013 21	Hønefoss	3–1	Sarpsborg 08	Hønefoss
18:00 CEST (UTC+2)	Riski 51'; Hovda 87'; Vendelbo 88'	Summary	Wiig 11'	Stadium: Aka Arena; Attendance: 2,882; Referee: Omar Rafiq

1 September 2013 22	Sarpsborg 08	2–1	Haugesund	Sarpsborg
18:00 CEST (UTC+2)	Tom Erik Breive 66'; Olanare 90'	Summary	Andreassen 61'	Stadium: Sarpsborg Stadion; Attendance: 3,061; Referee: Dag Hafsås

15 September 2013 23	Sandnes Ulf	2–0	Sarpsborg 08	Sandnes
18:00 CET (UTC+1)	Sola 56'; Lennon 90+4'	Summary		Stadium: Sandnes Stadium; Attendance: 2,718; Referee: Tommy Skjerven

22 September 2013 24	Sarpsborg 08	3–0	Tromsø	Sarpsborg
15:30 CEST (UTC+2)	Kronberg 18'; Elyounoussi 45+4'; Olanare 48'	Summary		Stadium: Sarpsborg Stadion; Attendance: 3,066; Referee: Ken Henry Johnsen

29 September 2013 25	Sarpsborg 08	1–2	Rosenborg	Sarpsborg
19:00 CET (UTC+2)	Olanare 42' (pen.)	Summary	Chibuike 72'; Helland 74'	Stadium: Sarpsborg Stadion; Attendance: 4,823; Referee: Tommy Skjerven

6 October 2013 26	Start	1–1	Sarpsborg 08	Kristiansand
15:30 CEST (UTC+2)	Vilhjálmsson 46'	Summary	Ernemann 60'	Stadium: Sør Arena; Attendance: 6,884; Referee: Per Ivar Staberg

18 October 2013 27	Sarpsborg 08	3–2	Brann	Sarpsborg
19:00 CEST (UTC+2)	Elyounoussi 28', 45'; Ernemann 44'	Summary	Askar 2'; Pusic 67'	Stadium: Sarpsborg Stadion; Attendance: 3,299; Referee: Brage Sandmoen

27 October 2013 28	Odd	2–2	Sarpsborg 08	Skien
18:00 CEST (UTC+2)	Johnsen 14'; Storbæk 70'; Gunnarsson (yellow card) 38' (yellow-red card) 77'	Summary	Olanare 44'; Kronberg 74'	Stadium: Skagerak Arena; Attendance: 6,382; Referee: Ola Hobber Nilsen

3 November 2013 29	Sarpsborg 08	1–0	Molde	Sarpsborg
18:00 CET (UTC+1)	Wiig 58'	Summary		Stadium: Sarpsborg Stadion; Attendance: 3,740; Referee: Trond Ivar Døvle

10 November 2013 30	Viking	2–1	Sarpsborg 08	Stavanger
18:00 CET (UTC+1)	Sulimani 90'; Nisja 90+4'	Summary	Valdimarsson 77'	Stadium: Viking Stadion; Attendance: 9,529; Referee: Trygve Kjensli

==== Table ====
Pos	Team	Pld	W	D	L	GF	GA	GD	Pts	Qualification or relegation
12	Sogndal	30	8	9	13	33	48	−15	33	
13	Sandnes Ulf	30	9	6	15	36	58	−22	33	
14	Sarpsborg 08 (O)	30	8	7	15	40	58	−18	31	Qualification for the relegation play-offs
15	Tromsø (R)	30	7	8	15	41	50	−9	29	Europa League qualifying and relegation to First Division (Note: Norway was among the best three associations in the UEFA Fair Play ranking and thus received an additional spot in the first qualifying round of the Europa League, Tromsø IL received the qualifying spot for their ranking in Tippeligaen's Fair Play ranking.)
16	Hønefoss (R)	30	6	11	13	34	47	−13	29	Relegation to First Division

Source: fotball.no
Rules for classification: 1) points; 2) goal difference; 3) number of goals scored.
(O) Play-off winners; (R) Relegated

=== Relegation play-offs ===
13 November 2013 1st Leg	Sarpsborg 08	1–0	Ranheim	Sarpsborg
20:15 CET (UTC+1)	Samuel 45+1'	Report		Stadium: Sarpsborg Stadion; Attendance: 3,355; Referee: Tom Harald Hagen

16 November 2013 2nd Leg	Ranheim	0–2 (0–3 agg.)	Sarpsborg 08	Trondheim
12:00 CET (UTC+1)		Report	Elyounoussi 35', 59'	Stadium: DNB Arena; Attendance: 1,085; Referee: Kristoffer Helgerud

=== Norwegian Cup ===
17 April 2013 First Round	Sparta Sarpsborg	0–3	Sarpsborg 08	Sarpsborg
18:00 CEST (UTC+2)		Report	Valdimarsson 1'; Thømt Jensen 24'; Kronberg 57'	Stadium: Sarpsborg Stadion; Attendance: 591; Referee: Thomas Lilleby

1 May 2013 Second Round	Kvik Halden	1–0	Sarpsborg 08	Halden
18:00 CEST (UTC+2)	Agim Shabani 83'	Report		Stadium: Halden Stadion; Attendance: 1,490; Referee: Bjørn Hansen

== Squad statistics ==
=== Appearances and goals ===
No.	Pos	Nat	Player	Total		Tippeligaen		Relegation play-off		Norwegian Cup	
No.	Pos	Nat	Player	Apps	Goals	Apps	Goals	Apps	Goals	Apps	Goals
3	DF	(Spain) ESP	Álvaro Baigorri	1	0	0+1	0	0	0	0	0
4	DF	(Norway) NOR	Kjetil Berge	30	0	23+3	0	2	0	2	0
5	MF	(Iceland) ISL	Þórarinn Ingi Valdimarsson	30	2	21+5	2	0+2	0	2	0
6	DF	(Norway) NOR	Christian Brink	23	2	19+3	2	0	0	0+1	0
7	FW	(Norway) NOR	Martin Wiig	32	6	27+2	6	1	0	2	0
8	MF	(Iceland) ISL	Guðmundur Þórarinsson	34	3	30	3	2	0	1+1	0
9	DF	(Norway) NOR	Berat Jusufi	11	0	0+8	0	0+1	0	1+1	0
12	MF	(Norway) NOR	Olav Øby	12	0	2+8	0	0+2	0	0	0
13	DF	(Norway) NOR	Ole Christoffer Heieren Hansen	28	0	24	0	2	0	2	0
17	MF	(Denmark) DEN	Steffen Ernemann	13	2	11	2	2	0	0	0
20	FW	(Norway) NOR	Magnus Sylling Olsen	22	3	8+11	3	1	0	2	0
22	MF	(Denmark) DEN	Claes Kronberg	31	2	21+7	2	1	0	2	0
23	MF	(Norway) NOR	Tom Erik Breive	29	3	24+2	3	2	0	1	0
24	FW	(Norway) NOR	Mohamed Elyounoussi	32	8	26+3	6	2	2	0+1	0
25	MF	(Norway) NOR	Martin Hoel Andersen	1	0	0+1	0	0	0	0	0
26	DF	(Norway) NOR	Martin Thømt Jensen	10	0	2+7	0	0	0	1	0
27	GK	(Jamaica) JAM	Duwayne Kerr	30	0	26	0	2	0	2	0
28	MF	(France) FRA	Derek Decamps	13	0	11	0	2	0	0	0
31	GK	(Norway) NOR	Christian Sukke	5	0	4+1	0	0	0	0	0
69	DF	(France) FRA	Jérémy Berthod	22	3	22	3	0	0	0	0
99	FW	(Nigeria) NGR	Aaron Olanare	15	6	13	5	2	1	0	0
Players away from Sarpsborg 08 on loan:
19	MF	(Norway) NOR	Mathias Engebretsen	2	0	0+1	0	0	0	0+1	0
21	MF	(Norway) NOR	Tobias Henanger	2	0	0+2	0	0	0	0	0
Players who left Sarpsborg 08 during the season:
10	MF	(Norway) NOR	Michael Røn	4	0	1+1	0	0	0	2	0
11	FW	(Norway) NOR	Øyvind Hoås	10	1	7+2	1	0	0	0+1	0
17	MF	(Iceland) ISL	Ásgeir Börkur Ásgeirsson	11	0	7+2	0	0	0	2	0

=== Goal scorers ===
Place	Position	Nation	Number	Name	Tippeligaen	Relegation play-off	Norwegian Cup	Total
1	FW	(Norway)	24	Mohamed Elyounoussi	6	2	0	8
2	FW	(Norway)	7	Martin Wiig	6	0	0	6
2	FW	(Nigeria)	99	Aaron Olanare	5	1	0	6
4	FW	(Norway)	20	Magnus Sylling Olsen	3	0	0	3
4	MF	(Iceland)	8	Guðmundur Þórarinsson	3	0	0	3
4	DF	(France)	69	Jérémy Berthod	3	0	0	3
4	MF	(Norway)	23	Tom Erik Breive	3	0	0	3
4	MF	(Iceland)	5	Þórarinn Ingi Valdimarsson	2	0	1	3
4	MF	(Denmark)	22	Claes Kronberg	2	0	1	3
10	MF	(Denmark)	17	Steffen Ernemann	2	0	0	2
10	DF	(Norway)	6	Christian Brink	2	0	0	2
10				Own goal	2	0	0	2
13	FW	(Norway)	11	Øyvind Hoås	1	0	0	1
13	DF	(Norway)	26	Martin Thømt Jensen	0	0	1	1
				TOTALS	40	3	3	46

=== Disciplinary record ===
Number	Nation	Position	Name	Tippeligaen		Relegation play-off		Norwegian Cup		Total	
Number	Nation	Position	Name	Yellow card	Red card	Yellow card	Red card	Yellow card	Red card	Yellow card	Red card
4	(Norway)	DF	Kjetil Berge	3	0	0	0	0	0	3	0
5	(Iceland)	MF	Þórarinn Ingi Valdimarsson	7	0	0	0	0	0	7	0
6	(Norway)	DF	Christian Brink	2	0	0	0	0	0	2	0
7	(Norway)	FW	Martin Wiig	2	0	0	0	0	0	2	0
8	(Iceland)	MF	Guðmundur Þórarinsson	2	0	0	0	0	0	2	0
9	(Norway)	DF	Berat Jusufi	0	0	0	0	1	0	1	0
11	(Norway)	FW	Øyvind Hoås	1	0	0	0	0	0	1	0
12	(Norway)	MF	Olav Øby	1	0	0	0	0	0	1	0
13	(Norway)	DF	Ole Christoffer Heieren Hansen	2	0	0	0	0	0	2	0
17	(Iceland)	MF	Ásgeir Börkur Ásgeirsson	6	0	0	0	0	0	6	0
17	(Norway)	MF	Steffen Ernemann	3	0	0	0	0	0	3	0
20	(Norway)	FW	Magnus Sylling Olsen	3	0	0	0	0	0	3	0
22	(Denmark)	MF	Claes Kronberg	3	0	0	0	0	0	3	0
23	(Norway)	MF	Tom Erik Breive	3	1	0	0	0	0	3	1
24	(Norway)	FW	Mohamed Elyounoussi	2	0	0	0	0	0	2	0
26	(Norway)	DF	Martin Thømt Jensen	1	0	0	0	0	0	1	0
27	(Jamaica)	GK	Duwayne Kerr	2	0	0	0	0	0	2	0
28	(France)	MF	Derek Decamps	2	0	1	0	0	0	3	0
69	(France)	DF	Jérémy Berthod	3	0	0	0	0	0	3	0
99	(Nigeria)	FW	Aaron Olanare	3	0	0	0	0	0	3	0
			TOTALS	51	1	1	0	1	0	53	1
