= 2015 Norwegian Football Cup =

Norgesmesterskapet i fotball for herrer

Tournament details
- Country: Norway
- Teams: 272 (overall); 128 (main competition)

Final positions
- Champions: Rosenborg (10th title)
- Runners-up: Sarpsborg 08

Tournament statistics
- Matches played: 127
- Goals scored: 551 (4.34 per match)
- Top goal scorer(s): Tomáš Malec (9 goals)

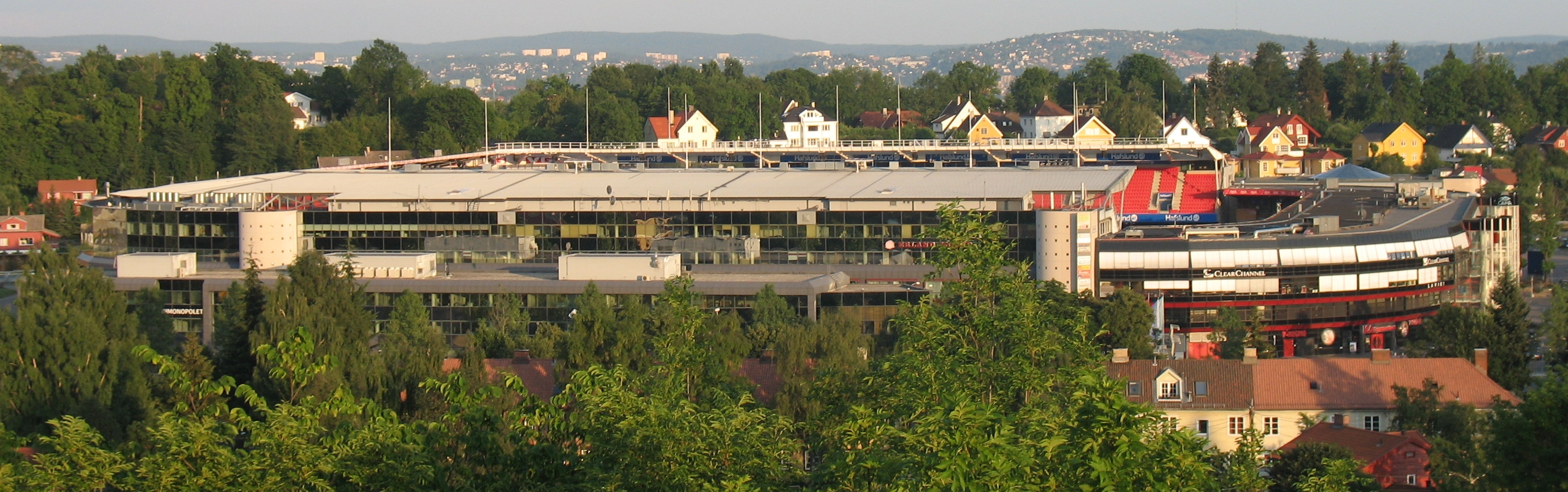
Ullevaal Stadion, Oslo - venue for the Norwegian Cup final

The 2015 Norwegian Football Cup was the 110th season of the Norwegian annual knock-out football tournament. It began with qualification matches in March 2015. The first round was played 21, 22 and 23 April 2015 and the tournament was ended with the final being held on 22 November 2015.

The victory would have earned Rosenborg a place in the second qualifying round of the 2016–17 UEFA Europa League, but since the club already had qualified to the 2016–17 UEFA Champions League as winners of the 2015 Tippeligaen, this berth was passed down to Odd, fourth-place fininshers in the league.

== Calendar ==
Below are the dates for each round as given by the official schedule:

| Round | Main date | Number of fixtures | Clubs |
|---|---|---|---|
| First Qualifying Round | 25 March 2015 | 96 | 272 → 176 |
| Second Qualifying Round | 8 April 2015 | 48 | 176 → 128 |
| First Round | 21–23 April 2015 | 64 | 128 → 64 |
| Second Round | 6–7 May 2015 | 32 | 64 → 32 |
| Third Round | 2–4 June 2015 | 16 | 32 → 16 |
| Fourth Round | 24 June 2015 | 8 | 16 → 8 |
| Quarter-finals | 12–13 August 2015 | 4 | 8 → 4 |
| Semi-finals | 23–24 September 2015 | 2 | 4 → 2 |
| Final | 22 November 2015 | 1 | 2 → 1 |

== First round ==
The 49 winners from the Second Qualifying Round joined with 79 clubs from the Tippeligaen, First Division and Second Division in this round of the competition.

Number of teams per tier entering this round
| Tippeligaen (1) | 1. divisjon (2) | 2. divisjon (3) | 3. divisjon (4) | 4. divisjon (5) | Total |
|---|---|---|---|---|---|
| 16 / 16 | 16 / 16 | 49 / 56 | 41 / 164 | 6 / 312 | 128 / 564 |

| 21 April 2015 | Lokomotiv Oslo (4) | 0–8 | (1) Vålerenga | Oslo |
| 18:00 CEST (UTC+2) | | Report | Berge 8'; Njie 19', 21', 33'; Stengel 26', 55'; Ómarsson 45'; Berre 73' | Stadium: Frogner stadion Attendance: 1,117; Referee: Espen Eskås |

| 21 April 2015 | Vigør (4) | 0–5 | (1) Start | Kristiansand |
| 18:00 CEST (UTC+2) | | Report | Ajer 43', 45+1', 52', 57'; Hoff 73' | Stadium: Hellemyr kunstgress Attendance: 876; Referee: Espen Larsen |

| 22 April 2015 | Bossekop (4) | 0–1 | (3) Mjølner | Alta |
| 16:30 CEST (UTC+2) | | Report | Henriksen 47' | Stadium: Coop Arena Kunstgress; Referee: Tom-Jøran Henriksen Solstrand |

| 22 April 2015 | Kirkenes (4) | 0–6 | (1) Bodø/Glimt | Kirkenes |
| 17:00 CEST (UTC+2) | | Report | Azemi 7', 29', 40'; D.Mikkelsen 39' (o.g.); Saltnes 51'; Konradsen 85' | Stadium: Kirkenes Stadion; Attendance: 350; Referee: Tom Egil Olsen |

| 22 April 2015 | Sortland (4) | 2–3 | (3) Tromsdalen | Sortland |
| 17:30 CEST (UTC+2) | Jørgensen 59'; Barlow 84' | Report | Lysvoll 66'; Kristoffersen 72'; Vibe 85' | Stadium: Blåbyhallen; Referee: Geir-Oskar Isaksen |

| 22 April 2015 | Ålgård (4) | 0–7 | (1) Viking | Ålgård |
| 18:00 CEST (UTC+2) | | Report | Chikere 17', 35' de Lanlay 28'; Nisja 66'; Böðvarsson 89', 90+2', 90+4' | Stadium: Ålgård Stadion; Attendance: 1,224; Referee: Ole Gya |

| 22 April 2015 | Arendal (3) | 3–1 (a.e.t.) | (3) Donn | Arendal |
| 18:00 CET (UTC+2) | Pepa 43'; Dreshaj 76', 88' | Report | Nilsen 14' | Stadium: Bjønnes Stadion; Attendance: 382; Referee: Jon Romuld Håversen |

| 22 April 2015 | Asker (4) | 1–2 | (1) Sandefjord | Asker |
| 18:00 CEST (UTC+2) | Sistek 48' | Report | M.Haakenstad 5'; Kirkevold 26' | Stadium: Føyka Stadion; Attendance: 671; Referee: Anders Gjermshus |

| 22 April 2015 | Brattvåg (4) | 0–2 | (1) Molde | Brattvåg |
| 18:00 CEST (UTC+2) | | Report | Høiland 37'; Svendsen 80' | Stadium: Brattvåg gras Attendance: 732; Referee: Mathias Smehus Kringstad |

| 22 April 2015 | Brodd (4) | 0–2 | (2) Bryne | Stavanger |
| 18:00 CEST (UTC+2) | | Report | Khalili 2'; Aamodt 65' | Stadium: Midfjord Kunstgras; Referee: Ola Kellerhals |

| 22 April 2015 | Byåsen (3) | 3–1 | (4) Sverresborg | Trondheim |
| 18:00 CET (UTC+2) | Risan 52'; Kala 70'; Ohrstrand 81' | Report | Bekken 62' | Stadium: Byåsen Arena; Attendance: 116; Referee: Mads Følstad Skarsem |

| 22 April 2015 | Fløy (3) | 1–1 (a.e.t.) (4–5 p) | (3) Vindbjart | Kristiansand |
| 18:00 CEST (UTC+2) | Birkeland 79' | Report | Vindfjell 55' | Stadium: Flekkerøy Stadion; Attendance: 450; Referee: Marius Lien |

| 22 April 2015 | Fløya (4) | 1–0 | (3) Alta | Tromsø |
| 18:00 CEST (UTC+2) | Tian Olsen 49' | Report | | Stadium: Fløyabanen; Referee: Ole Martin Loe |

| 22 April 2015 | Førde (3) | 0–5 | (3) Fyllingsdalen | Førde |
| 18:00 CEST (UTC+2) | | Report | Heltne 85'; Herrem 45', 68'; Stormyr 63'; Hella 90+4' | Stadium: Førde Stadion; Attendance: 100; Referee: Vebjørn Nord Haugland |

| 22 April 2015 | Fram Larvik (3) | 3–2 (a.e.t.) | (3) Lyn | Larvik |
| 18:00 CEST (UTC+2) | Gulliksen 58', 89'; Grorud 114' | Report | Brørby 39'; Hickson 75' | Stadium: Fram Stadion; Attendance: 427; Referee: Nedim Brbovic |

| 22 April 2015 | Fu/Vo (4) | 1–3 | (3) Kongsvinger | Oppåkermoen |
| 18:00 CEST (UTC+2) | Linstad 73' | Report | Moltzau 30'; Moldskred 68', 76' | Stadium: Funnefoss gress Attendance: 400; Referee: Magnus Nicolai Koløy |

| 22 April 2015 | Hallingdal (4) | 1–4 | (2) Hønefoss | Hallingdal |
| 18:00 CEST (UTC+2) | Lien 3' | Report | Mané 23', 78' (pen.), 89'; Kaluđerović 67' | Stadium: Gol kunstgress Attendance: 987; Referee: Kristoffer Helgerud |

| 22 April 2015 | HamKam (3) | 2–1 | (3) Lørenskog | Hamar |
| 18:00 CEST (UTC+2) | Hagen 37'; Oviasu 63' | Report | Ouhadou 61' | Stadium: Briskeby Arena; Attendance: 327; Referee: Tommy Frydenlund |

| 22 April 2015 | Hauerseter (4) | 2–4 | (3) KFUM Oslo | Nordkisa |
| 18:00 CEST (UTC+2) | Zamble 14'; Nygaard 21' | Report | Ek 3'; Obeng 37'; Aase 53', 72' | Stadium: Nordkisa stadion Attendance: 200; Referee: Tore Olsen Hagelund |

| 22 April 2015 | Holmen (3) | 0–1 | (3) Notodden | Holmen |
| 18:00 CEST (UTC+2) | | Report | Brekke 81' | Stadium: Holmen Arena; Attendance: 103; Referee: N/A |

| 22 April 2015 | Kjelsås (3) | 3–1 | (3) Sprint-Jeløy | Oslo |
| 18:00 CEST (UTC+2) | Pettersen 14'; Cham 31'; Møller 79' | Report | Hermansen 86' | Stadium: Grefsen Stadion; Attendance: 136; Referee: Per Erik Haugen |

| 22 April 2015 | Kråkerøy (4) | 0–4 | (1) Sarpsborg 08 | Kråkerøy |
| 18:00 CEST (UTC+2) | | Report | Ojamaa 39', 56'; Breive 42' (pen.); Askar 70' | Stadium: Kråkerøy Stadium; Attendance: 1,247; Referee: Torkel Jonsson Trædal |

| 22 April 2015 | Lysekloster (4) | 1–5 | (2) Sogndal | Os |
| 18:00 CEST (UTC+2) | K.Liseth 75' | Report | Kjemhus 18', 67'; Otoo 23'; Opseth 27'; F.Flo 90+1' | Stadium: Kuventræ; Attendance: 700; Referee: Steinar Hauge |

| 22 April 2015 | Mo (4) | 1–2 | (1) Tromsø | Mo i Rana |
| 18:00 CEST (UTC+2) | Jørgensen 10' | Report | Ingebrigtsen 26'; Ondrášek 45' | Stadium: New Sagbakken stadium Attendance: 800; Referee: Adrian Gjendemsjø |

| 22 April 2015 | Moss (3) | 1–2 (a.e.t.) | (3) Grorud | Moss |
| 18:00 CEST (UTC+2) | Isaksen 91' | Report | Slorby 100'; Garcia 110' (pen.) | Stadium: Melløs Stadion; Attendance: 190; Referee: Adrian Gjendemsjø |

| 22 April 2015 | Nardo (4) | 0–1 | (3) Stjørdals-Blink | Trondheim |
| 18:00 CEST (UTC+2) | | Report | Šišić 40' (pen.) | Stadium: Nissekollen; Attendance: 30; Referee: Kent Ove Westrum Hammer |

| 22 April 2015 | Nybergsund (3) | 1–3 | (3) Ull/Kisa | Nybergsund |
| 18:00 CEST (UTC+2) | Mendy 72' | Report | Standal 2'; Ahmadi 85'; Andreasson 90' | Stadium: Nybergsund Stadion; Attendance: 211; Referee: Shervin Enger Heydary |

| 22 April 2015 | Odda (3) | 0–1 | (3) Fana | Bergen |
| 18:00 CEST (UTC+2) | | Report | Hestetun 14' | Stadium: Nesttun Kunstgress; Attendance: 300; Referee: Svein Tore Sinnes |

| 22 April 2015 | Oppsal (4) | 5–5 (a.e.t.) (4–5 p) | (3) Kvik Halden | Oslo |
| 18:00 CEST (UTC+2) | Bjørseth 18', 101' (pen.); M.N. Jensen 24', 40', 50' | Report; Penalties | Suka 12'; Mufoncol 44'; Taletovic 55'; Berglund 89', 115' | Stadium: Trasop kunstgress Attendance: 200; Referee: Knut Ivar Strømstad |
| | Penalties |
| | Bjørseth (penalty scored); Gulbrandsen (penalty scored); Sakshaug (penalty missed); Østman (penalty scored); Ifejilika (penalty scored) | | (penalty scored) Hoel Andersen; (penalty scored) Berglund; (penalty scored) Taletovic; (penalty scored) Wembangomo; (penalty scored) Engebretsen |

| 22 April 2015 | Øystese (4) | 0–2 | (2) Åsane | Øystese |
| 18:00 CEST (UTC+2) | | Report | Nyborg 61'; Stueland 67' | Stadium: Øystese Idrettsplass; Attendance: 350; Referee: Sivert Amland |

| 22 April 2015 | Pors Grenland (4) | 2–4 | (2) Jerv | Porsgrunn |
| 18:00 CEST (UTC+2) | Bentsen 26' (pen.), 32' | Report | Omoijuanfo 20'; Robstad 33'; Jenssen 55'; Hagen 61' | Stadium: Pors Stadion; Attendance: 347; Referee: Petter Kristiansen Toppe |

| 22 April 2015 | Rælingen (4) | 3–9 | (1) Lillestrøm | Rælingen |
| 18:00 CEST (UTC+2) | S.Krolikowski 38'; C.Lamptey 58'; A.A.Tjernsli 83' | Report | Friday 19', 40', 61', 75'; Osvold 41'; Fofana 56'; Pellegrino 73', 89'; Krogstad 88' | Stadium: Marikollen kunstgress Attendance: 2,314; Referee: Anders Hauglund |

| 22 April 2015 | Randaberg (4) | 0–4 | (1) Haugesund | Randaberg |
| 18:00 CEST (UTC+2) | | Report | Myrestam 30'; Gytkjær 32', 41', 53' | Stadium: Randaberg Stadion; Attendance: 200; Referee: Daniel Higraff |

| 22 April 2015 | Rilindja (5) | 0–2 | (2) Bærum | Oslo |
| 18:00 CEST (UTC+2) | | Report | Aubert 84'; Alba 85' | Stadium: Haugerud Kunstgress; Attendance: 150; Referee: Bård Lindahl |

| 22 April 2015 | Riska (4) | 1–2 | (2) Sandnes Ulf | Hommersåk |
| 18:00 CEST (UTC+2) | Fjelde 67' | Report | Eriksen 10'; Berget Skjølsvik 44' | Stadium: Riska Stadion; Referee: Ørjan Vikene |

| 22 April 2015 | Rødde (3) | 1–0 | (4) NTNUI | Trondheim |
| 18:00 CEST (UTC+2) | Flatgård 75' | Report | | Stadium: Heimdal Kunstgress; Attendance: 80; Referee: Rikhard Haugen Lyng |

| 22 April 2015 | Runar (5) | 0–6 | (1) Stabæk | Sandefjord |
| 18:00 CEST (UTC+2) | | Report | Ekblom 7'; Diomande 24', 39'; Issah 30', 44'; Bensick 69' | Stadium: Haukerød Idrettsplass; Referee: Mohammed Uslem Aslam |

| 22 April 2015 | Sander (5) | 1–6 | (2) Strømmen | Sander |
| 18:00 CEST (UTC+2) | Radford 9' | Report | Ramsland 11', 36'; Konate 20', 79'; Melgalvis 22'; Achrifi 53' | Stadium: Sandermoen Gress; Attendance: 166; Referee: Jan Petter Randen |

| 22 April 2015 | Skedsmo (4) | 0–2 | (3) Raufoss | Skedsmokorset |
| 18:00 CEST (UTC+2) | | Report | Krug 30'; Onsrud 30' | Stadium: Skedsmo stadion Attendance: 150; Referee: Sulman Maroof Hussain |

| 22 April 2015 | Skotfoss (5) | 0–13 | (1) Odd | Skotfoss |
| 18:00 CEST (UTC+2) | | Report | Jonassen 10'; Lindseth 22', 37', 69', 87'; Zekhnini 24'; Johnsen 31'; Fredriksen 40', 90'; Lauritsen 59'; Berg 67'; Ruud 73'; Storbæk 89' | Stadium: Skotfoss Stadium; Attendance: 2,450; Referee: Tim Nicolai Fjellvang |

| 22 April 2015 | Spjelkavik (4) | 0–1 | (3) Træff | Ålesund |
| 18:00 CEST (UTC+2) | | Report | Markeng 84' | Stadium: Spjelkavik stadion Attendance: 100; Referee: Fredrik Klokk Løken |

| 22 April 2015 | Stord (4) | 0–2 | (2) Nest-Sotra | Stord |
| 18:00 CEST (UTC+2) | | Report | Næss 30', 50' (pen.) | Stadium: Vikahaugane Kunstgress; Referee: Jan Morten Tennøy |

| 22 April 2015 | Stryn (4) | 1–3 | (1) Aalesund | Stryn |
| 18:00 CEST (UTC+2) | M.Wie 2' | Report | Bjørdal 15'; Abdellaoue 62'; Larsen 80' | Stadium: Stryn krøllgras Attendance: 750; Referee: Petter Kristiansen Toppe |

| 22 April 2015 | Surnadal (5) | 0–5 | (2) Kristiansund | Alta |
| 18:00 CEST (UTC+2) | | Report | Todalshaug 24' (o.g.); Berg 26', 45', 90'; Coly 86' | Stadium: Alta Gress; Referee: Marte Sørø |

| 22 April 2015 | Trosvik (4) | 2–3 | (2) Follo | Fredrikstad |
| 18:00 CEST (UTC+2) | Skjærstein 25' (o.g.); Chaib 49' | Report | Levorstad 23'; Ruud Tveter 68', 90' (pen.) | Stadium: Merkur 1 Attendance: 674; Referee: Ole-Alexander Bustgaard Valen |

| 22 April 2015 | Tynset (4) | 0–3 | (3) Strindheim | Tynset |
| 18:00 CEST (UTC+2) | | Report | Krogstad 9'; Andersen 55'; Osafo 63' | Stadium: Nytrømoen; Attendance: 150; Referee: Robert Eggen |

| 22 April 2015 | Vard Haugesund (3) | 2–0 | (3) Vidar | Haugesund |
| 18:00 CEST (UTC+2) | Sumareh 11'; Miljeteig 36' | Report | | Stadium: Haugesund Stadion; Referee: Marius Hansen Grøtta |

| 22 April 2015 | Valdres (4) | 1–3 | (3) Gjøvik-Lyn | Fagernes |
| 18:00 CEST (UTC+2) | Mönell 53' | Report | Naglestad 4'; Laham 18'; Pachu 28' | Stadium: Gjensidigebanen kunstgress Attendance: 200; Referee: Ali al Hatam |

| 22 April 2015 | Varegg (4) | 4–2 | (3) Florø | Bergen |
| 18:00 CEST (UTC+2) | Kvalsvik 13'; Aabrekk 45'; Bjordal 57'; Chappy 86' | Report | Solheim-Olsen 3', 77' | Stadium: Stemmemyren Idrettsplass; Attendance: 100; Referee: Anders Bjerk Hansen |

| 22 April 2015 | Vestfossen (4) | 0–7 | (1) Mjøndalen | Vestfossen |
| 18:00 CEST (UTC+2) | | Report | Ingebretsen 14', 77'; Nilsen 26'; Sosseh 29', 55', 71'; J.S.Olsen 61' (pen.) | Stadium: Strandajordet Kunstgress; Attendance: 1,024; Referee: Ole-Martin Loeshagen |

| 22 April 2015 | Vuku (5) | 0–3 | (1) Rosenborg | Verdalsøra |
| 18:00 CEST (UTC+2) | | Report | Henderson 9'; Malec 12' (pen.); Nielsen 47' | Stadium: Elman stadion Attendance: 1,325; Referee: Thomas Solum Lystad |

| 22 April 2015 | Finnsnes (3) | 3–0 | (3) Harstad | Finnsnes |
| 19:00 CEST (UTC+2) | Andreassen 12'; Kristiansen 27'; Yndestad 40' | Report | | Stadium: Finnsnes stadion Attendance: 126; Referee: Vegar Ballovarre |

| 22 April 2015 | Lillehammer (4) | 3–4 | (3) Elverum | Lillehammer |
| 19:00 CEST (UTC+2) | Kvello 32'; Håkon Wæhler 60'; Løndal 67' | Report | Enkerud 2', 5'; Jelić 72'; Balstad 90' | Stadium: Stampesletta; Referee: Jørgen Haugen |

| 22 April 2015 | Sandnessjøen (4) | 0–13 | (2) Ranheim | Sandnessjøen |
| 19:00 CEST (UTC+2) | | Report | Rømo Skille 10', 86'; Snekvik 13'; Stene 27', 45', 46'; Tronseth 44'; Aas 73', 74', 81', 85', 88'; Øwre Gjertsen 83' | Stadium: Stamnes Arena; Attendance: 350; Referee: Kim-Runar Dalberg Olsen |

| 22 April 2015 | Tønsberg (4) | 0–5 | (1) Strømsgodset | Tønsberg |
| 20:00 CEST (UTC+2) | | Report | Jradi 43'; Storflor 46'; Vaagan Moen 70'; Kovács 80'; Abu 84' | Stadium: Tønsberg Gressbane; Referee: Rune Nilsen |

| 23 April 2015 | Egersund (3) | 0–2 (a.e.t.) | (3) Sola | Egersund |
| 18:00 CEST (UTC+2) | | Report | Maldal 101'; Berntsen 117' | Stadium: Idrettsparken; Attendance: 280; Referee: Even Myrheim |

| 23 April 2015 | Eidsvold Turn (3) | 2–0 | (3) Brumunddal | Eidsvoll |
| 18:00 CET (UTC+2) | Abshir 49'; Nesset 54' | Report | | Stadium: Myhrer stadion Attendance: 190; Referee: Ajdin Medic |

| 23 April 2015 | Herd (3) | 0–4 | (2) Hødd | Ålesund |
| 18:00 CEST (UTC+2) | | Report | Kallevåg 45'; Sandnes Beite 53'; Törnqvist 63'; Kleppe 86' | Stadium: AMFI Moa Stadion; Attendance: 250; Referee: Even Myrheim |

| 23 April 2015 | Neset (4) | 0–5 | (2) Levanger | Frosta |
| 18:00 CEST (UTC+2) | | Report | Bye 8', 52'; Sollie Rønning 23'; Díaz Barrera 49', 89' | Stadium: Vinnatrøa Kunstgress; Attendance: 203; Referee: Kristian Aune |

| 23 April 2015 | Os (4) | 1–6 | (2) Brann | Os |
| 18:00 CEST (UTC+2) | Borgen 81' | Report | Skaanes 6', 57'; Castro 14', 21', 68'; Huseklepp 36' | Stadium: Kuventræ Kunstgress; Attendance: 1,900; Referee: Kristoffer Hagenes |

| 23 April 2015 | Skeid (3) | 5–1 | (3) Drammen FK | Oslo |
| 18:00 CEST (UTC+2) | Tavakoli 21', 52'; Ahmad 23', 34'; Bergersen 81' | Report | Warp 48' | Stadium: Nordre Åsen; Attendance: 45; Referee: Trygve Kjensli |

| 23 April 2015 | Ørn-Horten (3) | 3–2 (a.e.t.) | (3) Ullern | Horten |
| 18:00 CEST (UTC+2) | Andersson 22'; Kowalski 45'; A.Teklamariam 77' | Report | Lundefaret 39', 90' | Stadium: Lystlunden; Referee: Edis Sistek |

| 23 April 2015 | Ås (4) | 1–5 | (2) Fredrikstad | Ås |
| 18:00 CEST (UTC+2) | Gimre 37' | Report | Nystrøm 4'; Nazari 12', 16', 52'; Hammar 36' | Stadium: Ås stadion Attendance: 640; Referee: Bjørn Hansen |

| 23 April 2015 | Salangen (4) | 1–3 | (3) Senja | Sjøvegan |
| 19:00 CEST (UTC+2) | Skog 12' | Report | Flaat 18'; Martinsen 31'; Østeraas 43' | Stadium: Idrettsheia Kunstgress; Attendance: 250; Referee: Tom-Jøran Henriksen Solstrand |

== Second round ==
The 64 winners from the First Round took part in this stage of the competition. These matches took place on 6 and 7 May 2015.

Number of teams per tier entering this round
| Tippeligaen (1) | 1. divisjon (2) | 2. divisjon (3) | 3. divisjon (4) | 4. divisjon (5) | Total |
|---|---|---|---|---|---|
| 16 / 16 | 16 / 16 | 30 / 56 | 2 / 164 | 0 / 312 | 64 / 564 |

| 6 May 2015 | Arendal (3) | 3–2 (a.e.t.) | (2) Sandnes Ulf | Arendal |
| 18:00 CET (UTC+2) | Sola 16' (o.g.); Pepa 99'; Rasmussen 104' | Report | Eriksen 61', 94' | Stadium: Bjønnes Stadion; Referee: Espen Larsen |

| 6 May 2015 | Byåsen (3) | 2–3 (a.e.t.) | (2) Ranheim | Trondheim |
| 18:00 CET (UTC+2) | Risan 48'; Furu 120' | Report | Furu 71' (o.g.); Stene 103', 105' (pen.) | Stadium: Byåsen Arena; Attendance: 245; Referee: Kim Rune Borgersen |

| 6 May 2015 | Eidsvold Turn (3) | 0–3 | (1) Lillestrøm | Eidsvoll |
| 18:00 CET (UTC+2) | | Report | Friday 40', 86'; Pellegrino 88' | Stadium: Myhrer stadion Attendance: 749; Referee: Anders Gjermshus |

| 6 May 2015 | Fana (3) | 1–3 | (2) Hødd | Bergen |
| 18:00 CEST (UTC+2) | Janbu 7' | Report | Kallevåg 22'; Sveen 75'; Myklebust 79' | Stadium: Nesttun Kunstgress; Attendance: 400; Referee: Sivert Amland |

| 6 May 2015 | Fyllingsdalen (3) | 4–1 | (1) Haugesund | Bergen |
| 18:00 CEST (UTC+2) | Herrem 23', 53' (pen.), 71'; Heltne 85' | Report | Diedhiou 39' | Stadium: Varden Amfi; Attendance: 648; Referee: Kai Erik Steen |

| 6 May 2015 | Fløya (4) | 0–6 | (1) Rosenborg | Tromsø |
| 18:00 CEST (UTC+2) | | Report | Nielsen 11'; Midtsjø 21'; Riski 31'; Malec 38', 56', 58' (pen.) | Stadium: Fløyabanen; Attendance: 1,102; Referee: Adrian Gjendemsjø |

| 6 May 2015 | Mjølner (3) | 0–1 | (1) Bodø/Glimt | Narvik |
| 18:00 CEST (UTC+2) | | Report | Azemi 76' | Stadium: Narvik Stadion; Attendance: 681; Referee: Geir-Oskar Isaksen |

| 6 May 2015 | Fram Larvik (3) | 0–1 | (1) Sandefjord | Larvik |
| 18:00 CEST (UTC+2) | | Report | M.Haakenstad 73' | Stadium: Fram Stadion; Attendance: 1,512; Referee: Mohammad Usman Aslam |

| 6 May 2015 | HamKam (3) | 0–2 | (2) Sogndal | Hamar |
| 18:00 CEST (UTC+2) | | Report | U.Flo 18'; Otoo 54' | Stadium: Briskeby Arena; Attendance: 475; Referee: Bjørn Hansen |

| 6 May 2015 | KFUM Oslo (3) | 1–3 | (1) Stabæk | Oslo |
| 18:00 CEST (UTC+2) | Obeng 76' | Report | Diomande 27'; Gorozia 33'; Granli 50' | Stadium: KFUM Arena; Attendance: 934; Referee: Anders Hauglund |

| 6 May 2015 | Kjelsås (3) | 0–4 | (1) Strømsgodset | Oslo |
| 18:00 CEST (UTC+02:00) | | Report | Nana 46'; Fossum 52'; Lehne Olsen 79'; Kovács 59' | Stadium: Grefsen Stadion; Attendance: 802; Referee: Espen Eskås |

| 6 May 2015 | Kongsvinger (3) | 3–1 | (2) Follo | Kongsvinger |
| 18:00 CEST (UTC+02:00) | Moldskred 16'; Solum 71', 84' | Report | Akinyemi 63' | Stadium: Gjemselund Stadion; Attendance: 749; Referee: Ole-Alexander Ekeli Valen |

| 6 May 2015 | Kvik Halden (3) | 2–2 (a.e.t.) (6–5 p) | (2) Fredrikstad | Halden |
| 18:00 CEST (UTC+02:00) | Bouchleh 57'; Berglund 73' | Report; Penalties | Nystrøm 23'; Nazari 47' | Stadium: Halden Stadion; Attendance: 1,114; Referee: Torkjell Trædal |
| | Penalties |
| | Hoel Andersen (penalty scored); Taletovic (penalty scored); Mehmeti (penalty missed); Turkaj (penalty scored); Engebretsen (penalty scored) | | (penalty scored) Nazari; (penalty scored) Nystrøm; (penalty scored) Straith; (penalty missed) D.A.Olsen; (penalty missed) Burgos |

| 6 May 2015 | Notodden (3) | 3–1 | (2) Jerv | Notodden |
| 18:00 CEST (UTC+2) | Brekke 31'; Hafsteinsson 45', 61' | Report | Myhre 3' | Stadium: Idrettsparken; Attendance: 234; Referee: Raymond Nyberg |

| 6 May 2015 | Raufoss (3) | 0–1 | (2) Hønefoss | Raufoss |
| 18:00 CEST (UTC+2) | | Report | Mané 87' | Stadium: Raufoss Stadion; Referee: Per Erik Haugen |

| 6 May 2015 | Rødde (3) | 1–4 (a.e.t.) | (2) Levanger | Trondheim |
| 18:00 CEST (UTC+2) | Rønning 87' (o.g.) | Report | Luvenberg 65'; Stokke 100', 113', 119' | Stadium: Heimdal Kunstgress; Attendance: 250; Referee: Richard Haugen Lyng |

| 6 May 2015 | Skeid (3) | 1–4 | (1) Odd | Oslo |
| 18:00 CEST (UTC+2) | Bojang 42' | Report | Johnsen 13', 89'; Jonassen 27'; Lindseth 90+1' | Stadium: Nordre Åsen; Attendance: 500; Referee: Tommy Frydenlund |

| 6 May 2015 | Sola (3) | 1–2 | (2) Bryne | Sola |
| 18:00 CEST (UTC+2) | Espedal 7' | Report | Čaušević 19', 66' | Stadium: Sola Stadion; Attendance: 350; Referee: Daniel Higraff |

| 6 May 2015 | Stjørdals-Blink (3) | 1–2 | (2) Kristiansund | Stjørdal |
| 18:00 CEST (UTC+2) | Augdal 74' | Report | Stamnestrø 86', 89' | Stadium: Nye Blinkbanen; Attendance: 450; Referee: Mads Følstad Skarsem |

| 6 May 2015 | Strindheim (3) | 2–5 | (1) Aalesund | Trondheim |
| 18:00 CEST (UTC+2) | Andersen 13'; Rye 84' | Report | Björk 18'; Bjørdal 44'; James 53', 64'; Matland 68' | Stadium: Strindheim kunstgress Attendance: 276; Referee: Robert Eggen |

| 6 May 2015 | Ull/Kisa (3) | 1–3 (a.e.t.) | (2) Strømmen | Jessheim |
| 18:00 CEST (UTC+2) | Ødemarksbakken 59' | Report | Sørensen Nergaard 89'; Konate 102', 119' | Stadium: UKI Arena; Attendance: 467; Referee: Trond Ivar Døvle |

| 6 May 2015 | Vard Haugesund (3) | 1–1 (a.e.t.) (3–4 p) | (2) Brann | Haugesund |
| 18:00 CEST (UTC+2) | Ulland Andersen 37' (pen.) | Report; Penalties | Orlov 90' | Stadium: Haugesund Stadion; Attendance: 722; Referee: Ola Kellerhals |
| | Penalties |
| | Løvland (penalty missed); Underhaug (penalty scored); Memic (penalty scored); Sandvik (penalty scored); Lilleng (penalty missed) | | (penalty scored) Huseklepp; (penalty scored) Orlov; (penalty scored) Barmen; (penalty scored) Acosta |

| 6 May 2015 | Vindbjart (3) | 4–0 | (1) Start | Vennesla |
| 18:00 CEST (UTC+2) | Gausdal 48' (pen.), 63'; Follerås 52'; Zernichow 82' | Report | | Stadium: Moseidmoen; Attendance: 2,300; Referee: Rohit Saggi |

| 6 May 2015 | Åsane (2) | 2–0 | (2) Nest-Sotra | Åsane |
| 18:00 CEST (UTC+2) | Soltvedt 41'; Lassen 86' | Report | | Stadium: Myrdal Gress; Attendance: 418; Referee: Svein Tore Sinnes |

| 6 May 2015 | Ørn-Horten (3) | 2–2 (a.e.t.) (3–4 p) | (1) Mjøndalen | Horten |
| 18:00 CEST (UTC+2) | T.Knutsen 31' (pen.); A.Teklamariam 55' | Report; Penalties | J.S.Olsen 15' (pen.); Gauseth 72' | Stadium: Lystlunden; Attendance: 428; Referee: Ole-Martin Loeshagen |
| | Penalties |
| | K.Silberg (penalty scored); T.Knutsen (penalty scored); T.Hem (penalty missed); L.Rustad (penalty scored); M.Berntzen (penalty missed) | | (penalty missed) J.S.Olsen; (penalty scored) Sosseh; (penalty scored) Gauseth; (penalty scored) Kapidžić; (penalty scored) M.S.Olsen |

| 6 May 2015 | Gjøvik-Lyn (3) | 1–0 | (1) Vålerenga | Gjøvik |
| 18:00 CEST (UTC+2) | Naglestad 61' | Report | | Stadium: Gjøvik Stadion; Attendance: 1,785; Referee: Mathias Smehus Kringstad |

| 6 May 2015 | Senja (3) | 2–1 | (1) Tromsø | Silsand |
| 19:00 CEST (UTC+2) | Ross 49'; Garfjell 90' | Report | Espejord 35' | Stadium: Islandbotn; Attendance: 600; Referee: Ole Martin Loe |

| 6 May 2015 | Tromsdalen (3) | 3–1 | (3) Finnsnes | Tromsø |
| 19:00 CEST (UTC+2) | Ahamed 71'; Kristoffersen 104'; Jakobsen 111' | Report | Bertheussen 65' (o.g.) | Stadium: Tromsdalen Stadion; Attendance: 126; Referee: Kim-Runar Dalberg Olsen |

| 7 May 2015 | Elverum (3) | 1–2 (a.e.t.) | (2) Bærum | Elverum |
| 18:00 CEST (UTC+2) | Bellhcen 39' | Report | Alba 66', 117' | Stadium: Elverum Stadion; Attendance: 220; Referee: Bård Lindahl |

| 7 May 2015 | Grorud (3) | 0–3 | (1) Sarpsborg 08 | Oslo |
| 18:00 CEST (UTC+2) | | Report | Zajić 6', 41'; Kalludra 66' | Stadium: Grorud matchbane Attendance: 214; Referee: Ajdin Medic |

| 7 May 2015 | Træff (3) | 0–2 | (1) Molde | Molde |
| 18:00 CEST (UTC+2) | | Report | Agnaldo 3'; Svendsen 47' | Stadium: Reknesbanen; Attendance: 1,150; Referee: Mathias Smehus Kringstad |

| 7 May 2015 | Varegg (4) | 0–9 | (1) Viking | Bergen |
| 18:00 CEST (UTC+2) | | Report | Bytyqi 27'; Chikere 31', 36', 42', 53', 74'; Böðvarsson 69'; Haugen 84'; Soares 90+1' | Stadium: Stemmemyren Idrettsplass; Attendance: 400; Referee: Jan Morten Tennøy |

== Third round ==
The 32 winners from the Second Round took part in this stage of the competition. These matches took place on 2, 3 and 4 June 2015.

Number of teams per tier entering this round
| Tippeligaen (1) | 1. divisjon (2) | 2. divisjon (3) | 3. divisjon (4) | 4. divisjon (5) | Total |
|---|---|---|---|---|---|
| 12 / 16 | 11 / 16 | 9 / 56 | 0 / 164 | 0 / 312 | 32 / 564 |

| 2 June 2015 | Fyllingsdalen (3) | 0–4 | (1) Molde | Bergen |
| 18:00 CEST (UTC+2) | | Report | Kamara 23' (pen.); Diouf 28'; Bendiksen 42'; Agnaldo 64' | Stadium: Varden Amfi; Attendance: 1,150; Referee: Ole Gya |

| 3 June 2015 | Bærum (2) | 0–1 | (2) Kristiansund | Sandvika |
| 17:00 CEST (UTC+2) | | Report | Torske 84' | Stadium: Sandvika Stadion; Attendance: 351; Referee: Jan Morten Tennøy |

| 3 June 2015 | Arendal (3) | 3–5 | (1) Viking | Arendal |
| 18:00 CEST (UTC+2) | K.Chopart 26'; Y.Ibrahimaj 32'; Stray 72' | Report | Chikere 20'; Þorsteinsson 57', 90+2'; Berisha 70'; Böðvarsson 85' | Stadium: Bjønnes Stadium; Attendance: 1,113; Referee: Tore Hansen |

| 3 June 2015 | Gjøvik-Lyn (3) | 0–2 | (1) Sarpsborg 08 | Gjøvik |
| 18:00 CEST (UTC+2) | | Report | Trondsen 26'; Qaka 73' | Stadium: Gjøvik Stadion; Attendance: 804; Referee: Bjørn Hansen |

| 3 June 2015 | Hødd (2) | 1–0 | (1) Aalesund | Ulsteinvik |
| 18:00 CEST (UTC+2) | Myklebust 37' | Report | | Stadium: Høddvoll Stadion; Attendance: 2,974; Referee: Kai Erik Steen |

| 3 June 2015 | Kongsvinger (3) | 3–3 (a.e.t.) (5–6 p) | (1) Sandefjord | Kongsvinger |
| 18:00 CEST (UTC+2) | Røyrane 35'; Maikel 45' (pen.); M.Moldskred 52' | Report; Penalties | Sellin 7'; Kirkevold 42'; Larsen 65' | Stadium: Gjemselund Stadion; Attendance: 1,512; Referee: Sigurd Smehus Kringstad |
| | Penalties |
| | M.Solum (penalty scored); Maikel (penalty scored); M.Moldskred (penalty scored); M.Ellingsen (penalty missed); T.Bjerk-Edvardsen (penalty scored); O.Moltzau (penalty scored); E.Dadjo (penalty missed) | | (penalty missed) Gabrielsen; (penalty scored) Mjelde; (penalty scored) Kirkevold; (penalty scored) Mendy; (penalty scored) Torp; (penalty scored) Larsen; (penalty scored) Sellin |

| 3 June 2015 | Kvik Halden (3) | 0–0 (a.e.t.) (4–2 p) | (1) Strømsgodset | Halden |
| 18:00 CEST (UTC+2) | | Report; Penalties | | Stadium: Halden Stadion; Attendance: 1,457; Referee: Martin Lundby |
| | Penalties |
| | Hoel Andersen (penalty scored); Strømsborg (penalty scored); Taletovic (penalty scored); Suka-Suka (penalty missed); Engebretsen (penalty scored) | | (penalty scored) Fossum; (penalty scored) Nguen; (penalty missed) Ogunjimi; (penalty missed) Wikheim |

| 3 June 2015 | Levanger (2) | 0–7 | (1) Rosenborg | Levanger |
| 18:00 CEST (UTC+2) | | Report | Nielsen 4'; Helland 9', 61', 82' (pen.); Malec 15', 19', 76' (pen.) | Stadium: Moan gress Attendance: 2,116; Referee: Anders Johansen |

| 3 June 2015 | Notodden (3) | 1–4 | (1) Mjøndalen | Notodden |
| 18:00 CEST (UTC+2) | T.Kaven 82' | Report | Gauseth 26' (pen.); Sosseh 29'; J.S.Olsen 72'; Kapidžić 80' | Stadium: Notodden Stadion; Attendance: 1,015; Referee: Espen A. Eskandari |

| 3 June 2015 | Ranheim (2) | 0–2 | (2) Åsane | Trondheim |
| 18:00 CEST (UTC+2) | | Report | Lorentzen 24'; Nyborg 86' | Stadium: DnB Arena; Referee: Torkjell Jonsson Trædal |

| 3 June 2015 | Senja (3) | 1–3 | (1) Stabæk | Silsand |
| 18:00 CEST (UTC+2) | Johnsgård 74' | Report | Diomande 42', 58'; Asante 85' | Stadium: Islandbotn; Attendance: 603; Referee: Christian Moen |

| 3 June 2015 | Sogndal (2) | 1–2 | (2) Hønefoss | Sogndalsfjøra |
| 18:00 CEST (UTC+2) | Psyché 81' | Report | Mané 59', 62' | Stadium: Fosshaugane Campus; Attendance: 539; Referee: Petter Toppe |

| 3 June 2015 | Strømmen (2) | 2–1 (a.e.t.) | (1) Lillestrøm | Strømmen |
| 18:00 CET (UTC+2) | Hansen 90', 120' | Report | Fofana 78' | Stadium: Strømmen Stadion; Attendance: 1,850; Referee: Trond Ivar Døvle |

| 3 June 2015 | Vindbjart (3) | 2–4 | (1) Odd | Vennesla |
| 18:00 CEST (UTC+2) | Repstad 27'; Jones 58' | Report | Bentley 5'; Storbæk 36'; Ruud 61'; Berg 75' | Stadium: Moseidmoen; Attendance: 2,611; Referee: Trygve Kjensli |

| 4 June 2015 | Bryne (2) | 1–4 | (2) Brann | Bryne |
| 19:00 CEST (UTC+2) | Tveita 43' | Report | Pedersen 2'; Demir 58'; Castro 71'; Huseklepp 87' | Stadium: Bryne Stadion; Attendance: 1,635; Referee: Anders Gjermshus |

| 4 June 2015 | Tromsdalen (3) | 6–2 | (1) Bodø/Glimt | Tromsø |
| 18:00 CEST (UTC+2) | T.Mienna 16'; Lysvoll 25', 52'; Kjæve 40'; Ahamed 90' | Report | Azemi 45'; Sørloth 61' | Stadium: Tromsdalen Stadion; Attendance: 718; Referee: Steinar Hauge |

== Fourth round ==
The 16 winners from the Third Round took part in this stage of the competition. These matches took place on 24 June 2015.

Number of teams per tier entering this round
| Tippeligaen (1) | 1. divisjon (2) | 2. divisjon (3) | 3. divisjon (4) | 4. divisjon (5) | Total |
|---|---|---|---|---|---|
| 8 / 16 | 6 / 16 | 2 / 56 | 0 / 164 | 0 / 312 | 16 / 564 |

| 24 June 2015 | Molde (1) | 3–0 | (3) Kvik Halden | Molde |
| 18:00 CEST (UTC+2) | Kamara 11'; Høiland 25' (pen.); O. Strømsborg 65' (o.g.) | Report | | Stadium: Aker Stadion; Attendance: 2,424; Referee: Trond Ivar Døvle |

| 24 June 2015 | Rosenborg (1) | 7–1 | (3) Tromsdalen | Trondheim |
| 18:00 CEST (UTC+2) | Malec 3', 70'; Riski 6'; M. Jensen 38'; Helland 68', 86'; Pedersen 77' (o.g.) | Report | Ahamed 51' | Stadium: Lerkendal Stadion; Attendance: 4,641; Referee: Trygve Kjensli |

| 24 June 2015 | Stabæk (1) | 5–1 | (2) Strømmen | Bærum |
| 19:00 CEST (UTC+2) | Asante 34'; Jalasto 63'; Diomande 70', 77'; Granli 83' | Report | M. Ramsland 17' | Stadium: Nadderud Stadion; Attendance: 1,890; Referee: Tom Harald Hagen |

| 24 June 2015 | Hønefoss (2) | 2–3 | (1) Sandefjord | Hønefoss |
| 19:00 CEST (UTC+2) | Beugré 17', 66' | Report | Kirkevold 28'; Mendy 62'; K. Hansen 75' | Stadium: Aka Arena; Attendance: 808; Referee: Omar Rafiq |

| 24 June 2015 | Mjøndalen (1) | 4–0 | (2) Hødd | Mjøndalen |
| 19:00 CEST (UTC+2) | Aasmundsen 26'; Kapidžić 37'; Midtgarden 55'; Törnqvist 75' (o.g.) | Report | | Stadium: Isachsen Stadion; Attendance: 1,313; Referee: Ken Henry Johnsen |

| 24 June 2015 | Odd (1) | 4–0 | (2) Åsane | Skien |
| 19:00 CEST (UTC+2) | Storbæk 4', 51'; Johnsen 62'; Occéan 87' | Report | | Stadium: Skagerak Arena; Attendance: 2,600; Referee: Martin Lundby |

| 24 June 2015 | Kristiansund (2) | 2–2 (a.e.t.) (0–3 p) | (1) Viking | Kristiansund |
| 19:00 CEST (UTC+2) | Økland 69' (pen.); Lund 115' | Report | Abdullahi 61'; Adegbenro 108' | Stadium: Atlanten Stadion; Attendance: 2,673; Referee: Dag Vidar Hafsås |
| | Penalties |
| | Økland (penalty missed); Månsson (penalty missed); Lund (penalty missed) | | (penalty scored) Hoseth; (penalty scored) Berisha; (penalty scored) Sigurðsson |

| 24 June 2015 | Brann (2) | 0–0 (a.e.t.) (1–4 p) | (1) Sarpsborg 08 | Bergen |
| 20:00 CEST (UTC+2) | | Report | | Stadium: Brann Stadion; Attendance: 2,100; Referee: Tommy Skjerven |
| | Penalties |
| | Larsen (penalty scored); Demidov (penalty missed); E.Hansson (penalty missed) | | (penalty scored) Ernemann; (penalty scored) Øby; (penalty scored) Askar; (penalty scored) Bellaïd |

== Quarter-finals ==
The 8 winners from the Fourth Round took part in this stage of the competition. The matches were played on 12 and 13 August 2015.

Number of teams per tier entering this round
| Tippeligaen (1) | 1. divisjon (2) | 2. divisjon (3) | 3. divisjon (4) | 4. divisjon (5) | Total |
|---|---|---|---|---|---|
| 8 / 16 | 0 / 16 | 0 / 56 | 0 / 164 | 0 / 312 | 8 / 564 |

| 12 August 2015 | Sarpsborg 08 (1) | 2–1 | (1) Odd | Sarpsborg |
| 18:00 CEST (UTC+2) | Mortensen 14', 47' | Report | Trondsen 6' (pen.) | Stadium: Sarpsborg Stadion; Attendance: 2,366; Referee: Ken Henry Johnsen |

| 12 August 2015 | Viking (1) | 3–0 | (1) Molde | Stavanger |
| 20:00 CEST (UTC+2) | Adegbenro 22'; Böðvarsson 37'; Sigurðsson 84' | Report | | Stadium: Viking Stadion; Attendance: 7,864; Referee: Tore Hansen |

| 13 August 2015 | Sandefjord (1) | 0–1 | (1) Stabæk | Sandefjord |
| 18:00 CEST (UTC+2) | | Report | Diomande 64' | Stadium: Komplett Arena; Attendance: 1,824; Referee: Tommy Skjerven |

| 13 August 2015 | Rosenborg (1) | 4–0 | (1) Mjøndalen | Trondheim |
| 19:35 CEST (UTC+2) | Søderlund 16' de Lanlay 28'; Vilhjálmsson 34'; Helland 59' | Report | | Stadium: Lerkendal Stadion; Attendance: 7,736; Referee: Ola Hobber Nilsen |

== Semi-finals ==
The 4 winners from the Quarter-finals takes part in this stage of the competition. These matches were played on 23 and 24 September 2015.

Number of teams per tier entering this round
| Tippeligaen (1) | 1. divisjon (2) | 2. divisjon (3) | 3. divisjon (4) | 4. divisjon (5) | Total |
|---|---|---|---|---|---|
| 4 / 16 | 0 / 16 | 0 / 56 | 0 / 164 | 0 / 312 | 4 / 564 |

| 23 September 2015 | Rosenborg (1) | 3–2 (a.e.t.) | (1) Stabæk | Trondheim |
| 20:00 CEST (UTC+2) | Helland 7'; Søderlund 78'; Vilhjálmsson 95' | Report | Keita 52'; Næss 70' | Stadium: Lerkendal Stadion; Attendance: 9,932; Referee: Tom Harald Hagen |

| 24 September 2015 | Viking (1) | 0–1 (a.e.t.) | (1) Sarpsborg 08 | Stavanger |
| 20:00 CEST (UTC+2) | | Report | Mortensen 98' | Stadium: Viking Stadion; Attendance: 12,942; Referee: Dag Vidar Hafsås |

== Final ==
The 2015 Norwegian Football Cup final was played between Rosenborg and Sarpsborg 08 at Ullevaal Stadion in Oslo on 22 November 2015.

22 November 2015
13:15 CET (UTC+1)

| Rosenborg | 2–0 | Sarpsborg 08 |
|---|---|---|
| Helland 22'; Jensen 40' | Report |

Ullevaal Stadion, Oslo
Attendance: 26,507
Referee: Ken Henry Johnsen (Husøy & Foynland)
