= List of Norwegian football transfers summer 2013 =

This is a list of Norwegian football transfers in the Summer transfer window 2013 by club. Only clubs of the 2013 Norwegian Premier League are included.

== 2013 Norwegian Premier League ==
=== Aalesund ===
In: Note: Flags indicate national team as defined under FIFA eligibility rules; some limited exceptions apply. Players may hold more than one non-FIFA nationality.

No.	Pos.	Nation	Player
—	DF	NGA	Akeem Latifu (on loan from Hødd)
—	MF	MAR	Houcine Zaidoun (on loan from OC Safi)

Out: Note: Flags indicate national team as defined under FIFA eligibility rules; some limited exceptions apply. Players may hold more than one non-FIFA nationality.

No.	Pos.	Nation	Player
—	MF	JAM	Jason Morrison (released)

=== Brann ===
In: Note: Flags indicate national team as defined under FIFA eligibility rules; some limited exceptions apply. Players may hold more than one non-FIFA nationality.

No.	Pos.	Nation	Player
—	DF	MKD	Daniel Mojsov (from Vojvodina)
—		GHA	Kennedy Ashia (from Iberty Professionals)

Out: Note: Flags indicate national team as defined under FIFA eligibility rules; some limited exceptions apply. Players may hold more than one non-FIFA nationality.

No.	Pos.	Nation	Player
—	DF	HUN	Zsolt Korcsmár (to SpVgg Greuther Fürth)
—	DF	NOR	Jonas Grønner (on loan to KR Reykjavik)
—	MF	NOR	Fredrik Nordkvelle (to Odd)
—	FW	RUS	Vasili Pavlov (loan return to Dacia Chişinău)

=== Haugesund ===
In: Note: Flags indicate national team as defined under FIFA eligibility rules; some limited exceptions apply. Players may hold more than one non-FIFA nationality.

No.	Pos.	Nation	Player

Out: Note: Flags indicate national team as defined under FIFA eligibility rules; some limited exceptions apply. Players may hold more than one non-FIFA nationality.

No.	Pos.	Nation	Player
—	FW	NOR	Alexander Søderlund (to Rosenborg)

=== Hønefoss ===
In: Note: Flags indicate national team as defined under FIFA eligibility rules; some limited exceptions apply. Players may hold more than one non-FIFA nationality.

No.	Pos.	Nation	Player
—	FW	NOR	Øyvind Hoås (from Sarpsborg 08)
—	DF	NOR	Simon Larsen (on loan from Vålerenga)
—	GK	NOR	Magnus Hjulstad (from Bærum)
—	FW	NOR	Ole Petter Berget (own youth squad)

Out: Note: Flags indicate national team as defined under FIFA eligibility rules; some limited exceptions apply. Players may hold more than one non-FIFA nationality.

No.	Pos.	Nation	Player
—	DF	NOR	Frode Lafton (retired)
—	MF	NOR	Pål Erik Ulvestad (loan return to Molde)
—	FW	NOR	Kevin Beugré (on loan to Mjøndalen)

=== Lillestrøm ===
In: Note: Flags indicate national team as defined under FIFA eligibility rules; some limited exceptions apply. Players may hold more than one non-FIFA nationality.

No.	Pos.	Nation	Player
—	DF	AUT	Thomas Piermayr (from Wiener Neustadt)
—	GK	NOR	Jon Knudsen (from retirement, on short term contract)

Out: Note: Flags indicate national team as defined under FIFA eligibility rules; some limited exceptions apply. Players may hold more than one non-FIFA nationality.

No.	Pos.	Nation	Player
—	FW	NOR	Fredrik Gulbrandsen (to Molde)
—	GK	NOR	Jon Knudsen (retirement, end of short term contract)

=== Molde ===
In: Note: Flags indicate national team as defined under FIFA eligibility rules; some limited exceptions apply. Players may hold more than one non-FIFA nationality.

No.	Pos.	Nation	Player
—	MF	NOR	Mats Møller Dæhli (from Manchester United)
—	FW	NOR	Tommy Høiland (from Sandnes Ulf)
—	DF	NOR	Vegard Forren (from Southampton)
—	DF	NOR	Per Egil Flo (from Sogndal)
—	FW	NOR	Fredrik Gulbrandsen (from Lillestrøm)

Out: Note: Flags indicate national team as defined under FIFA eligibility rules; some limited exceptions apply. Players may hold more than one non-FIFA nationality.

No.	Pos.	Nation	Player
—	MF	NOR	Magnus Wolff Eikrem (to Heerenveen)
—	FW	FIN	Lauri Dalla Valle (to Sint-Truiden)
—	DF	USA	Sean Cunningham (Released)

=== Odd ===
In: Note: Flags indicate national team as defined under FIFA eligibility rules; some limited exceptions apply. Players may hold more than one non-FIFA nationality.

No.	Pos.	Nation	Player
—	FW	NOR	Ole Jørgen Halvorsen (from Fredrikstad)
—	MF	NOR	Fredrik Nordkvelle (from Brann)

Out: Note: Flags indicate national team as defined under FIFA eligibility rules; some limited exceptions apply. Players may hold more than one non-FIFA nationality.

No.	Pos.	Nation	Player
—	FW	NOR	Adem Güven (to Mersin İdmanyurdu)
—	MF	NGA	George White (on loan to Strømmen)

=== Rosenborg ===
In: Note: Flags indicate national team as defined under FIFA eligibility rules; some limited exceptions apply. Players may hold more than one non-FIFA nationality.

No.	Pos.	Nation	Player
—	FW	NOR	Alexander Søderlund (from Haugesund)

Out: Note: Flags indicate national team as defined under FIFA eligibility rules; some limited exceptions apply. Players may hold more than one non-FIFA nationality.

No.	Pos.	Nation	Player
—	FW	NOR	Tarik Elyounoussi (to TSG Hoffenheim)

=== Sandnes Ulf ===
In: Note: Flags indicate national team as defined under FIFA eligibility rules; some limited exceptions apply. Players may hold more than one non-FIFA nationality.

No.	Pos.	Nation	Player
—	FW	SCO	Steven Lennon (from Fram Reykjavik)
—	FW	NOR	Erik Tønne (from Sheffield United)

Out: Note: Flags indicate national team as defined under FIFA eligibility rules; some limited exceptions apply. Players may hold more than one non-FIFA nationality.

No.	Pos.	Nation	Player
—	DF	NOR	Bjørnar Holmvik (to Kalmar FF)
—	DF	NOR	Tommy Høiland (to Molde)
—	MF	SWE	Jakob Olsson (to Ljungskile SK)
—	FW	CAN	Tosaint Ricketts (to Bucaspor)
—		NOR	Steffen Haugland (on loan to Fram Reykjavik)

=== Sarpsborg 08 ===
In: Note: Flags indicate national team as defined under FIFA eligibility rules; some limited exceptions apply. Players may hold more than one non-FIFA nationality.

No.	Pos.	Nation	Player
—	FW	NGA	Aaron Samuel Olanare (from Vålerenga)
—	MF	DEN	Steffen Ernemann (from Esbjerg)
—	DF	FRA	Derek Decamps (on loan from Angers)

Out: Note: Flags indicate national team as defined under FIFA eligibility rules; some limited exceptions apply. Players may hold more than one non-FIFA nationality.

No.	Pos.	Nation	Player
—	FW	NOR	Øyvind Hoås (to Hønefoss)
—	MF	NOR	Michael Røn (released)
—	MF	ISL	Ásgeir Börkur Ásgeirsson (loan return to Fylkir)
—	MF	NOR	Mathias Engebretsen (loaned out to Moss)
—	MF	NOR	Tobias Henanger (loaned out to Østsiden)
—	GK	ISL	Haraldur Björnsson (loaned out to Fredrikstad)

=== Sogndal ===
In: Note: Flags indicate national team as defined under FIFA eligibility rules; some limited exceptions apply. Players may hold more than one non-FIFA nationality.

No.	Pos.	Nation	Player

Out: Note: Flags indicate national team as defined under FIFA eligibility rules; some limited exceptions apply. Players may hold more than one non-FIFA nationality.

No.	Pos.	Nation	Player
—	DF	NOR	Per Egil Flo (to Molde)

=== Start ===
In: Note: Flags indicate national team as defined under FIFA eligibility rules; some limited exceptions apply. Players may hold more than one non-FIFA nationality.

No.	Pos.	Nation	Player
—	DF	FIN	Markus Heikkinen (from Rapid Wien)

Out: Note: Flags indicate national team as defined under FIFA eligibility rules; some limited exceptions apply. Players may hold more than one non-FIFA nationality.

No.	Pos.	Nation	Player

=== Strømsgodset ===
In: Note: Flags indicate national team as defined under FIFA eligibility rules; some limited exceptions apply. Players may hold more than one non-FIFA nationality.

No.	Pos.	Nation	Player
15	FW	NOR	Flamur Kastrati (from Erzgebirge Aue)
92	FW	NOR	Ola Kamara (on loan from SV Ried)

Out: Note: Flags indicate national team as defined under FIFA eligibility rules; some limited exceptions apply. Players may hold more than one non-FIFA nationality.

No.	Pos.	Nation	Player
1	GK	NOR	Borger Thomas (loan to Drammen)
21	MF	GHA	Enock Kwakwa (loan return to Manchester City)

=== Tromsø IL ===
In: Note: Flags indicate national team as defined under FIFA eligibility rules; some limited exceptions apply. Players may hold more than one non-FIFA nationality.

No.	Pos.	Nation	Player
—	MF	CAN	Zakari Hamza (on loan from Eupen)
—	MF	GER	Hendrik Helmke (from Jaro)

Out: Note: Flags indicate national team as defined under FIFA eligibility rules; some limited exceptions apply. Players may hold more than one non-FIFA nationality.

No.	Pos.	Nation	Player
—	MF	NOR	Ruben Yttergård Jenssen (to 1. FC Kaiserslautern)
—	FW	NOR	Vegard Lysvoll (to Tromsdalen UIL)
—	FW	SUI	Aleksandar Prijović (loan return to Sion)

=== Viking ===
In: Note: Flags indicate national team as defined under FIFA eligibility rules; some limited exceptions apply. Players may hold more than one non-FIFA nationality.

No.	Pos.	Nation	Player
—	FW	NGA	Osita Henry Chikere (from Sunshine Stars)
—	FW	AUT	Benjamin Sulimani (from Admira Wacker)

Out: Note: Flags indicate national team as defined under FIFA eligibility rules; some limited exceptions apply. Players may hold more than one non-FIFA nationality.

No.	Pos.	Nation	Player
—	MF	NOR	Jon-Helge Tveita (on loan to Bryne)
—	FW	EST	Henri Anier (on loan to Motherwell)
—	MF	DEN	Martin Ørnskov (on loan to Brøndby)

=== Vålerenga ===
In: Note: Flags indicate national team as defined under FIFA eligibility rules; some limited exceptions apply. Players may hold more than one non-FIFA nationality.

No.	Pos.	Nation	Player

Out: Note: Flags indicate national team as defined under FIFA eligibility rules; some limited exceptions apply. Players may hold more than one non-FIFA nationality.

No.	Pos.	Nation	Player
—	FW	NGA	Aaron Samuel Olanare (to Sarpsborg 08)
