= Tomáš Malec (footballer) =

Slovak footballer

Personal information
- Date of birth: 5 January 1993 (age 33)
- Place of birth: Trenčín, Slovakia
- Height: 1.99 m (6 ft 6 in)
- Position: Forward

Team information
- Current team: Dukla Banská Bystrica
- Number: 29

Youth career
- TJ Melčice - Lieskové
- AS Trenčín

Senior career*
Years	Team	Apps	(Gls)
2010–2016	AS Trenčín	82	(20)
2012–2013	→ Tatran Liptovský Mikuláš (loan)	21	(5)
2014–2015	→ Rosenborg (loan)	20	(6)
2015–2016	→ Sigma Olomouc (loan)	15	(4)
2016–2017	LASK Linz	0	(0)
2016–2017	→ Lillestrøm (loan)	24	(3)
2017	DAC Dunajská Streda	7	(0)
2018	Žalgiris Vilnius	26	(8)
2019	RFS	19	(6)
2019–2020	Vis Pesaro	17	(1)
2020–2021	Senica	31	(8)
2021–2023	GKS Tychy	42	(4)
2023–2024	SK Prostějov	43	(8)
2024–2025	Dukla Banská Bystrica	25	(4)
2025-	ASK Ybbs	0	(0)

International career
- Slovakia U15
- Slovakia U16
2010–2011	Slovakia U17	2	(0)
2017	Slovakia	2	(0)
- * Club domestic league appearances and goals as of 1 January 2025

Tomáš Malec (born 5 January 1993) is a Slovak professional footballer who plays as a striker for Slovak First Football League club Dukla Banská Bystrica.

== Club career ==
While playing for Trenčín, Malec finished the 2013–14 Slovak First Football League as top scorer with 14 goals. On 11 August 2014, he went on loan to Rosenborg in Norway for the rest of the season. The agreement included an option for expanding the loan into a permanent transfer if agreed at the end of the current season Having scored 6 goals in 20 league matches for Rosenburg, Malec signed a one-year loan deal with Czech First League side Sigma Olomouc in August 2015. He scored on his Olomouc debut, netting the deciding goal in a 2–1 win against Vysočina Jihlava. In 2016 he left Olomouc and signed for LASK Linz of Austria, subsequently heading back to Norway, this time on loan to Lillestrøm.

In the 2018 season Malec played for Žalgiris Vilnius, scoring 8 goals in 25 matches. After the season he left team.

On 20 August 2019, he signed with Italian Serie C club Vis Pesaro.

Malec returned to Slovak football ahead of the 2020–21 season, joining Senica. He scored five goals for the club in his first four months.

== National team ==
Malec was first called up to the senior national team for two unofficial friendly fixtures held in Abu Dhabi, UAE, in January 2017, against Uganda and Sweden. He made his debut against Uganda, being fielded from the start until the 70th minute, when he was substituted for Dávid Guba. Slovakia went on to lose the game 1–3. He also played the last thirty minutes of a 0–6 loss against Sweden, replacing Pavol Šafranko.

== Honours ==
Rosenborg

- Tippeligaen: 2015
- Norwegian Cup: 2015

Lillestrøm

- Norwegian Cup: 2017

Žalgiris

- Lithuanian Cup: 2018

RFS

- Latvian Cup: 2019

Individual

- Slovak First Football League top scorer: 2013–14
