= Álvaro Baigorri =

Spanish footballer

Personal information
- Full name: Álvaro Baigorri del Río
- Date of birth: 11 August 1983 (age 43)
- Place of birth: Madrid, Spain
- Height: 1.77 m (5 ft 9 1/2 in)
- Position: Left-back

Youth career
- Real Madrid
- Atlético Madrid

Senior career*
Years	Team	Apps	(Gls)
2002–2003	S.S. Reyes	30	(2)
2003–2004	Racing Santander B	20	(0)
2004–2005	Leganés	20	(0)
2005–2010	Castellón	93	(1)
2005–2006	→ Alicante (loan)	11	(0)
2010–2011	Ceuta	22	(0)
2012–2013	Sarpsborg 08	22	(0)
2014–2015	Moss	34	(3)
2017–2018	Borgar	33	(2)
2019	Sparta Sarpsborg	17	(1)
Total		302	(9)
- * Club domestic league appearances and goals

Álvaro Baigorri del Río (born 11 August 1983) is a Spanish former professional footballer who played as a left-back.

== Club career ==
Born in Madrid, Baigorri played lower league football until the age of 23, representing UD San Sebastián de los Reyes, Racing de Santander B, CD Leganés and Alicante CF. In summer 2006 he moved to CD Castellón, who had already acquired him the previous year.

Baigorri played his first game as a professional on 2 September 2006, featuring the second half of a 4–2 away loss against UD Vecindario in the Segunda División. He finished his first year with 29 matches, helping the Valencian Community team to the 14th position.

Baigorri scored his only goal in the second tier on 22 September 2007, Castellón's second in the 2–2 away draw with Sevilla Atlético. He left the club in June 2010 after it suffered relegation, and returned to the Segunda División B by joining AD Ceuta.

In January 2012, Baigorri moved abroad for the first time in his career, signing with Sarpsborg 08 FF from the Norwegian 1. divisjon. He joined another side in the country two years later, 2. divisjon's Moss FK.

== Career statistics ==
As of match played 24 October 2015

Appearances and goals by club, season and competition
Club	Season	League			National Cup		Continental		Total	
Club	Season	Division	Apps	Goals	Apps	Goals	Apps	Goals	Apps	Goals
Sarpsborg 08	2012	1. divisjon	19	0	2	0	–		21	3
Sarpsborg 08	2013	Eliteserien	1	0	0	0	–		1	0
Sarpsborg 08	Total		20	0	2	0	-	-	22	0
Moss	2014	2. divisjon	25	3	1	0	–		26	3
Moss	2015	2. divisjon	9	0	0	0	–		9	0
Moss	Total		34	3	1	0	-	-	35	3
Career total			54	3	3	0	-	-	57	3
