= Stanley Ihugba =

Nigerian footballer

Personal information
- Full name: Stanley Chinedu Ihugba
- Date of birth: 19 November 1987 (age 38)
- Place of birth: Jos, Nigeria
- Height: 1.71 m (5 ft 7 1/2 in)
- Position: Midfielder

Team information
- Current team: Skjetten
- Number: 15

Youth career
- 2000–2004: Plateau United

Senior career*
Years	Team	Apps	(Gls)
2004–2006	Plateau United		
2007–2008	Heartland	36	(0)
2009–2010	Lyn	32	(1)
2011	Ull/Kisa	9	(1)
2011–2012	Sarpsborg 08	40	(1)
2013–2014	Ull/Kisa	42	(0)
2015	Ørn-Horten	9	(0)
2015	Eidsvold		
2016	Brumunddal	15	(0)
2017–	Skjetten		

International career^{‡}
2004–	Nigeria	10	(0)
- * Club domestic league appearances and goals as of 30 May 2016 ‡ National team caps and goals as of 1 December 2008

Stanley Chinedu Ihugba (born 19 November 1987, in Jos) is a Nigerian football midfielder who plays for Skjetten.

== Career ==
Ihugba began his career by Plateau United, joined then in 2007 to Heartland F.C. where played 36 games in his first season. He moved in January 2009 to Norway on trial; he passed through a training with FC Lyn Oslo, who has on 2 February 2009 signed a contract running to 31 December 2011. However the team went bankrupt in 2010.

After stints at Sarpsborg 08 FF and Ull/Kisa he joined Ørn-Horten in 2015. However, after half a season he was released. In 2016, he went on to Brumunddal, owing to a local fundraiser. He went on to Skjetten in 2017, and after missing the entire 2018 season, he was back in 2019.

== Career statistics ==
As of 2 November 2013

Club	Season	Division	League		Cup		Total	
Club	Season	Division	Apps	Goals	Apps	Goals	Apps	Goals
2009	Lyn	Eliteserien	21	0	4	0	25	0
2010	Lyn	1. divisjon	11	1	2	1	13	2
2011	Ull/Kisa	2. divisjon	9	1	1	1	10	2
2011	Sarpsborg 08	Eliteserien	13	0	0	0	13	0
2012	Sarpsborg 08	1. divisjon	27	1	2	0	29	1
2013	Ull/Kisa	1. divisjon	26	0	3	0	29	0
2014	Ull/Kisa	1. divisjon	16	0	3	0	19	0
2015	Ørn-Horten	2. divisjon	9	0	2	0	11	0
2016	Brumunddal	2. divisjon	15	0	0	0	15	0
Career Total			147	3	17	2	164	5
