= Vegard Lysvoll =

Norwegian footballer (born 1989)

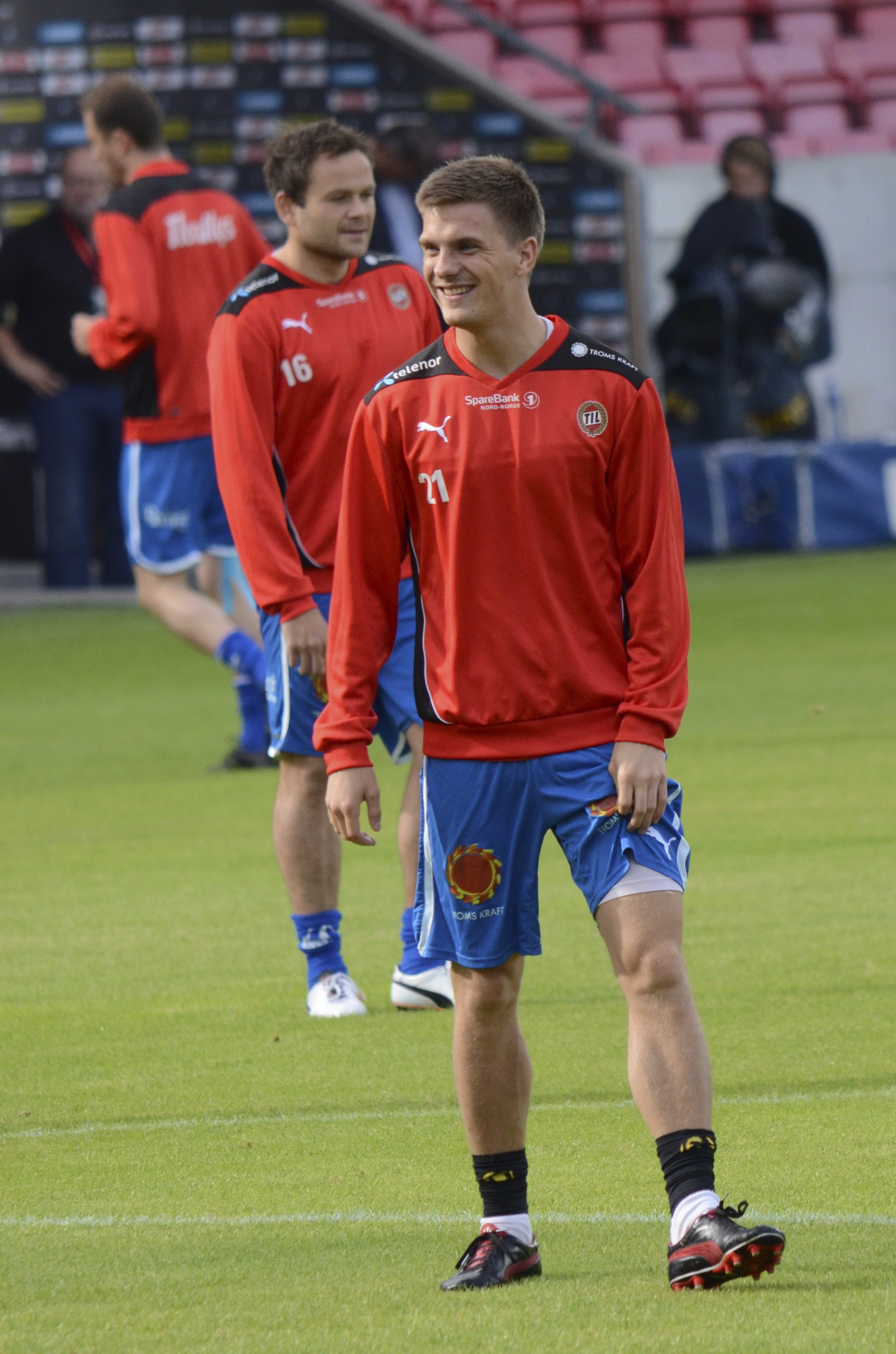

Personal information
- Full name: Vegard Bergstedt Lysvoll
- Date of birth: 16 August 1989 (age 37)
- Place of birth: Bodø, Norway
- Height: 1.77 m (5 ft 9 1/2 in)
- Position: Striker

Team information
- Current team: Ulfstind
- Number: 11

Youth career
- Svolvær

Senior career*
Years	Team	Apps	(Gls)
2008	Lofoten		
	Start	0	(0)
2009–2011	Tromsdalen	70	(35)
2012–2013	Tromsø	5	(0)
2012	→ Tromsdalen (loan)	11	(2)
2013–2022	Tromsdalen	215	(91)
2023–	Ulfstind	24	(24)
- * Club domestic league appearances and goals as of 11 December 2025

Vegard Bergstedt Lysvoll (born 16 August 1989) is a Norwegian footballer who plays as a striker for Ulfstind. He played for Svolvær, Lofoten and Start before he joined Tromsdalen ahead of the 2009 season. After scoring 30 goals in the 2011 season, Lysvoll transferred to Tromsø. He spent the second half of the 2012 season on loan with his old club Tromsdalen, before he moved permanently to his old club in 2013.

== Club career ==
Lysvoll was born in Bodø and grew up in Henningsvær. He moved to Svolvær at the age of 15 and started playing football for Svolvær IL, before he joined the 2. divisjon side Lofoten. Lysvoll scored two goals in his first match for the club, a pre-season friendly. He later moved to Start together with his twin brother Håvard Lysvoll at the age of 18. After half a year at Start, they moved back north and joined Tromsdalen ahead of the 2009 season. In 2011, he became top scorer in 2. divisjon with 30 goals when the team won promotion to the 1. divisjon. That season, Lysvoll also scored the team's record-breaking 100th goal; Tromsdalen finished with a total of 105, a new Norwegian record.

Lysvoll was wanted by Bodø/Glimt, but joined Tromsø together with his teammate from Tromsdalen, Ruben Kristiansen. He got his debut in 3–0 defeat against Rosenborg, and made a total of four appearances for Tromsø in the 2012 Tippeligaen. Lysvoll scored the last goal in the 4–0 victory against Tromsdalen in the Third round of the 2012 Norwegian Football Cup, and chose to not celebrate his goal against his old club.

In August 2012 he was loaned out to Tromsdalen to play more regularly. Lysvoll returned to Tromsø for the 2013 season, but did not play much for the first team. When he came on as a substitute against Strømsgodset on 29 June 2013 it was his first appearance that season, and the club told Lysvoll that he could transfer to another club during the summer transfer window if he wanted. After failing to become a regular member in Tromsø's first team, Lysvoll rejoined his former club Tromsdalen in August 2013.

== Career statistics ==
=== Club ===
As of match played 23 August 2025

Appearances and goals by club, season and competition
Club	Season	League			National Cup		Continental		Total	
Club	Season	Division	Apps	Goals	Apps	Goals	Apps	Goals	Apps	Goals
Tromsdalen	2009	1. divisjon	18	0	0	0	-		18	0
Tromsdalen	2010	1. divisjon	26	5	3	4	-		29	9
Tromsdalen	2011	2. divisjon	26	30	2	4	-		28	34
Tromsdalen	Total		70	35	5	8	-	-	75	43
Tromsø	2012	Tippeligaen	4	0	3	1	2	0	9	1
Tromsø	2013	Tippeligaen	1	0	1	0	0	0	2	0
Tromsø	Total		5	0	4	1	2	0	11	1
Tromsdalen (loan)	2012	1. divisjon	11	2	0	0	-		11	2
Tromsdalen (loan)	Total		11	2	0	0	-	-	11	2
Tromsdalen	2013	2. divisjon	11	9	0	0	-		11	9
Tromsdalen	2014	1. divisjon	28	14	3	3	-		31	17
Tromsdalen	2015	2. divisjon	26	21	4	3	-		30	24
Tromsdalen	2016	2. divisjon	23	10	2	4	-		25	14
Tromsdalen	2017	1. divisjon	30	8	1	0	-		31	8
Tromsdalen	2018	1. divisjon	29	11	2	0	-		31	11
Tromsdalen	2019	1. divisjon	21	5	1	0	-		22	5
Tromsdalen	2020	2. divisjon	10	5	-		-		10	5
Tromsdalen	2021	2. divisjon	22	6	1	1	-		23	7
Tromsdalen	2022	2. divisjon	15	2	0	0	-		15	2
Tromsdalen	Total		215	91	14	11	-	-	229	102
Ulfstind	2023	4. divisjon	17	19	0	0	-		17	19
Ulfstind	2024	3. divisjon	5	4	1	1	-		6	5
Ulfstind	2025	3. divisjon	2	1	1	0	-		3	1
Ulfstind	Total		24	24	2	1	-	-	26	25
Career total			325	152	25	21	2	0	352	173
