= Derek Decamps =

French footballer (born 1985)

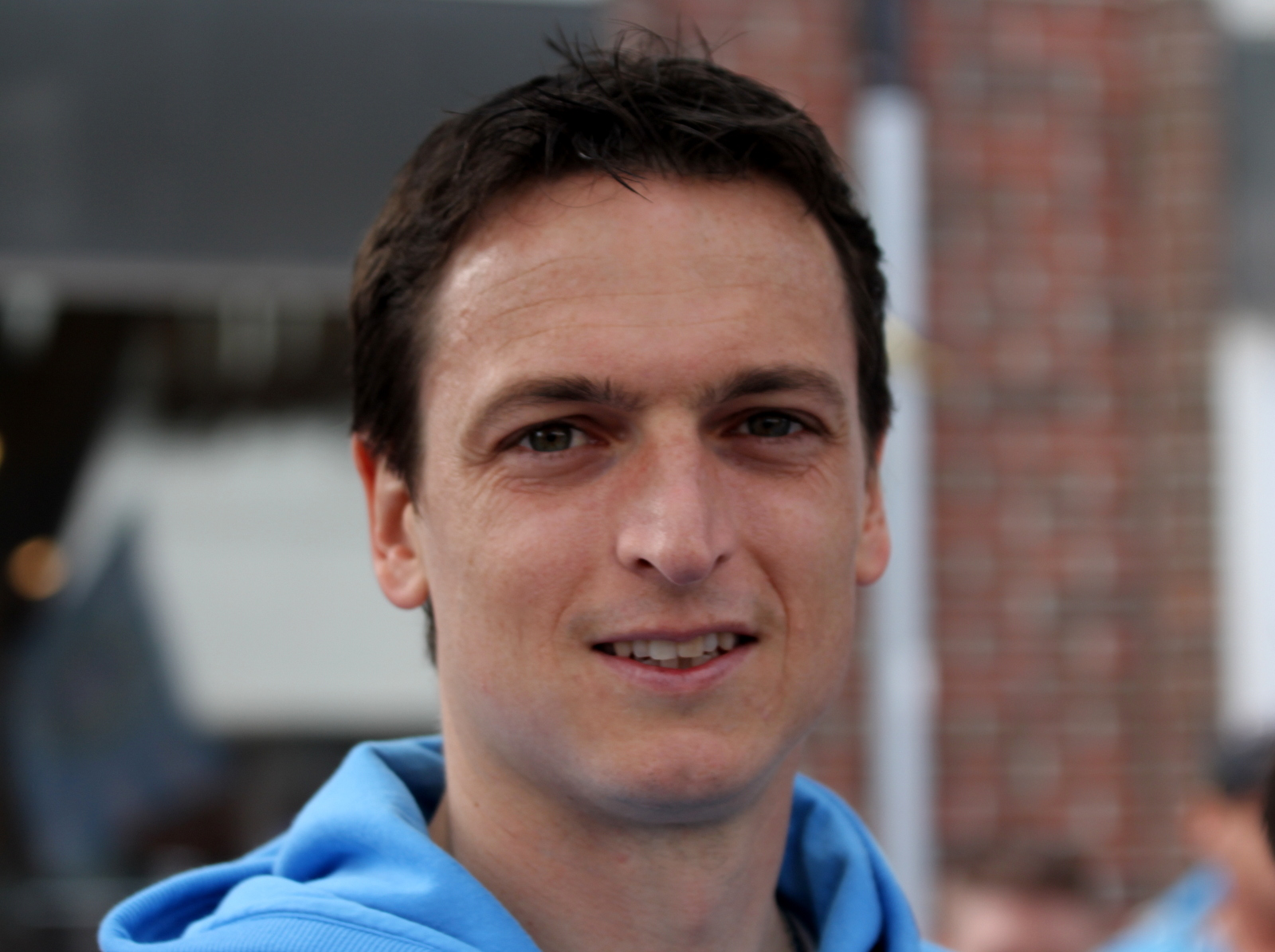

Personal information
- Full name: Derek Romain Francois Bruno Decamps
- Date of birth: 2 May 1985 (age 41)
- Place of birth: Paris, France
- Height: 1.87 m (6 ft 2 in)
- Position: Centre-back

Youth career
- 1995–1998: Milan

Senior career*
Years	Team	Apps	(Gls)
1998–2005	Cannes		
2005–2006	Aris	18	(1)
2006–2007	PAS Giannina	28	(1)
2007–2008	Lorca Deportiva	19	(0)
2008–2009	Alcorcón	6	(1)
2009	Santa Eulàlia	12	(0)
2009–2011	Ajax Cape Town	35	(2)
2011–2012	Haugesund	19	(1)
2012–2014	Angers	3	(0)
2013	→ Sarpsborg 08 (loan)	11	(0)
2014–2015	Sandnes Ulf	56	(0)

Managerial career
- 2019–2023: Cannes (coach)
- * Club domestic league appearances and goals

Derek Decamps (born 2 May 1985) is a French footballer who played as a centre-back.

== Career ==
Born in Paris, France, Decamps began playing football with AS Cannes, and moved to Greece to play for Aris Thessaloniki F.C. and PAS Giannina F.C. in the Super League Greece.

He moved to Spain and played for Lorca Deportiva CF and AD Alcorcón in the Spanish Segunda División B.

On 15 August 2009, the 24-year-old French defender left his Spanish club Santa Eulàlia of the Spanish Segunda División B to join South African side Ajax Cape Town. In the 2010–11 season he played a big part in Ajax's successful league campaign in which Ajax finished 2nd after only managing a draw in the last home game. A win would have won the championship for the Cape Town side.

On 27 June 2011, the Norwegian club FK Haugesund announced that they had signed Decamps on a one-year contract. After one year Decamps was a regular starter for Haugesund in Tippeligaen, and the club wanted to renew his contract, but Decamps chose to move home to his family in France when his contract expired on 31 July 2012. In August 2013 he signed a loan contract with Sarpsborg 08 for the season.

In January 2014 he returned to the Tippeligaen joining Sandnes Ulf. Over the course of two years he played 56 league games and 2 cup games.

From August 2019 to June 2023 he was on the coaching staff of AS Cannes.
