= Steffen Ernemann =

Danish footballer (born 1982)

Personal information
- Full name: Steffen Ernemann
- Date of birth: 26 April 1982 (age 44)
- Place of birth: Odder, Denmark
- Height: 1.86 m (6 ft 1 in)
- Position: Midfielder

Youth career
- Odder IGF
- BMI
- AGF

Senior career*
Years	Team	Apps	(Gls)
2002–2003	AGF	17	(3)
2003–2007	Horsens	111	(9)
2007–2009	Silkeborg	51	(14)
2009–2010	Zulte Waregem	20	(2)
2010–2011	Roeselare	28	(8)
2011–2013	Esbjerg fB	23	(1)
2013–2016	Sarpsborg 08	87	(11)
2017–2018	Viking	43	(0)
2019	Sogndal	22	(0)

Managerial career
- 2022: Esbjerg fB (caretaker)
- * Club domestic league appearances and goals as of 30 June 2020

Steffen Ernemann (born 26 April 1982) is a Danish former professional footballer.

== Career ==
Steffen Ernemann played his youth career in Odder IGF and BMI. In 1999, Steffen Ernemann moved to AGF Youth Academy and in 2002 he became pro in AGF's first team. Steffen Ernemann left AGF in 2003 and moved to AC Horsens, who played in the second best league (1. division). Steffen Ernemann played in AC Horsens for 4 years. In that period AC Horsens promoted to the Danish Superliga and became a regular component in the Danish Superliga.

In the summer 2007 Steffen Ernemann moved to Silkeborg IF, who just relegated from the Danish Superliga. In Steffen Ernemann first season (2007/2008), Silkeborg IF missed promotion. The following season Silkeborg promoted to the Danish Superliga, but Steffen Ernemann didn't extend his contract at Silkeborg IF.

In the summer 2009, Steffen Ernemann signed as a free agent at Zulte Waregem. First season was successful and Steffen played regular in the center midfield. Zulte Waregem reached the playoffs that season (first playoff's in Belgien). The following season a new coach arrived in Zulte Waregem, and he had other plans. Steffen Ernemann went on loan to Roeselare from the second best league.

In the summer 2011 Steffen Ernemann went home to Denmark and signed as a free agent for Esbjerg FB. Steffen played 2 years for Esbjerg FB and in that period Esbjerg FB promoted to from the first division to the Superliga, and the following year Esbjerg FB won the Cup and ended as nr. 4 in the Superliga.

In August 2013, Steffen Ernemann signed a 5-month contract with Sarpsborg 08. After a hard season, Sarpsborg 08 extended their status as Tippeliga Club by winning relegation playoffs against Ranheim. In the 2013 Steffen Ernemann scored goal of the year in Norway, which was given by NISO. Steffen Ernemann extended his contract at Sarpsborg 08 in December 2013 for 3 more years. The following 3 years Sarpsborg 08 established themselves as a solid Tippeliga team. In 2015 season Sarpsborg 08 reached the Cup final, but lost (2–0) to Rosenborg BK.

In 2016 Steffen Ernemann's contract with Sarpsborg 08 expired and he joined Viking as a free agent. In the 2017 season Viking FK relegated from the Tippeliga and in 2018 season, Viking FK promoted to the Tippeliga again. After the 2018 season, Steffen Ernemann's did not renew his contract and he left Viking. In the 2019 season Steffen Ernemann signed a 1-year contract in Sogndal. In October 2019, Steffen Ernemann decided to retire from football after the 2019 season.

In 2020 Steffen Ernemann started his coaching career in Esbjerg fB in Denmark. In April 2022 he was made caretaker manager of Esbjerg following the resignation of manager Michael Kryger. In July 2022 he became new academy coach at SønderjyskE.

== Career statistics ==
As of 4 November 2019

Season	Club	Division	League		Cup		Total	
Season	Club	Division	Apps	Goals	Apps	Goals	Apps	Goals
2012–13	Esbjerg	Danish Superliga	23	1	0	0	23	1
2013	Sarpsborg 08	Eliteserien	11	2	0	0	11	2
2014	Sarpsborg 08	Eliteserien	24	2	5	0	29	2
2015	Sarpsborg 08	Eliteserien	28	3	5	0	33	3
2016	Sarpsborg 08	Eliteserien	25	4	5	2	30	6
2017	Viking	Eliteserien	20	0	0	0	20	0
2018	Viking	1. divisjon	23	0	2	0	25	0
2019	Sogndal	1. divisjon	22	0	1	0	23	0
Career Total			176	12	18	2	194	15

== Honours ==
Esbjerg fB

- Danish Cup: 2012–13
