= Tom Erik Breive =

Norwegian footballer (born 1980)

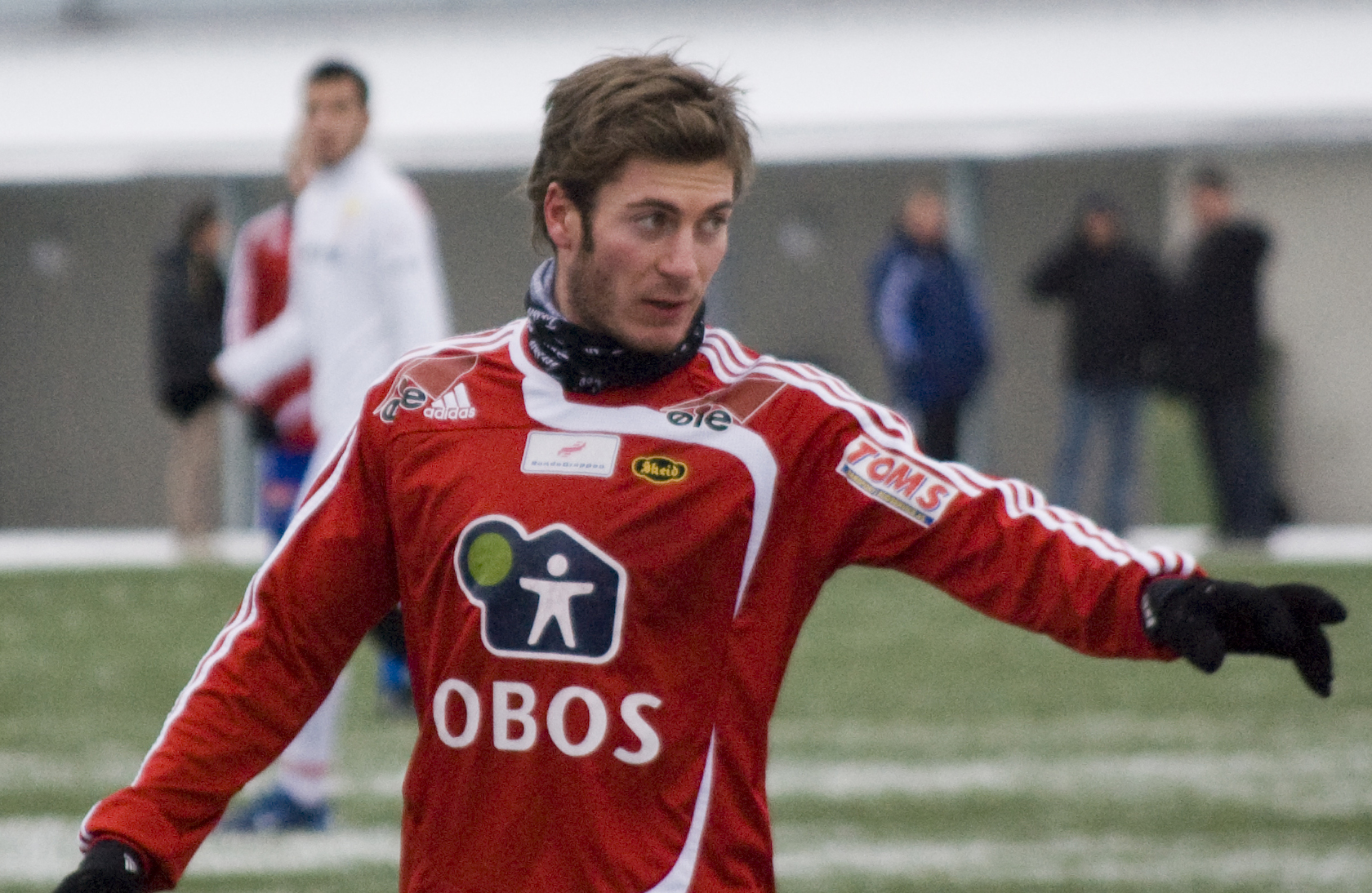
- Breive playing for Skeid

Personal information
- Date of birth: 18 April 1980 (age 46)
- Place of birth: Steigen
- Height: 1.75 m (5 ft 9 in)
- Position: Midfielder

Youth career
- Steigen
- Skeid

Senior career*
Years	Team	Apps	(Gls)
- Oslo Øst
2000–2008	Skeid		
2009–2015	Sarpsborg 08	106	(24)
- * Club domestic league appearances and goals as of 4 August 2013

Tom Erik Breive (born 18 April 1980) is a retired Norwegian football midfielder who played for Oslo Øst, Skeid and Sarpsborg 08. He is known as a free kick specialist.
