= Halden Stadion =

Sports venue in Halden, Norway

Halden Stadium
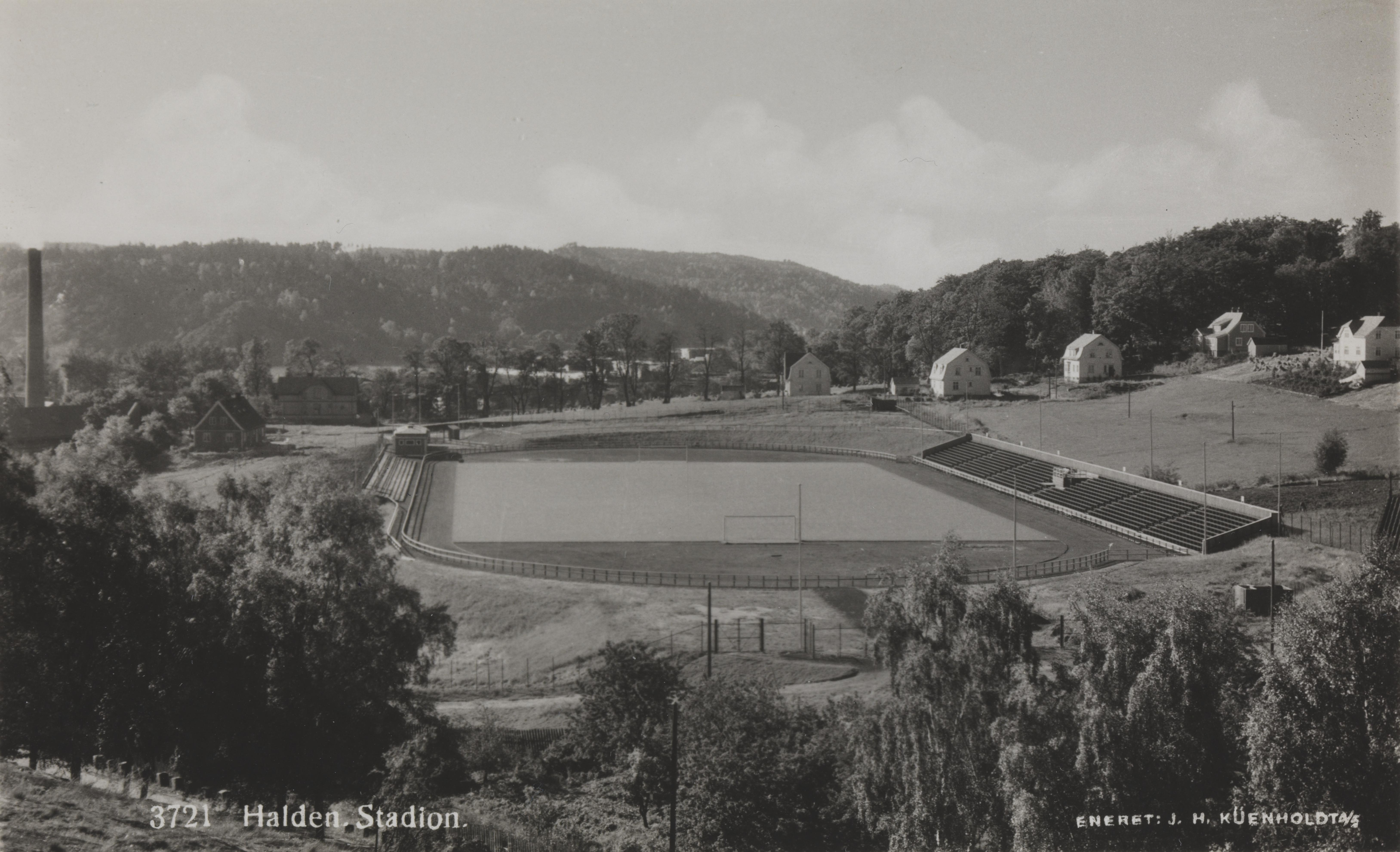
- A 1930s postcard of Halden Stadion
- Interactive map of Halden Stadium
- Location: Halden, Norway
- Coordinates: 59.122671°N 11.374369°E
- Owner: Halden municipality
- Capacity: 5000 (4000 seats)
- Surface: Artificual turf
- Field size: 105m x 68m

Construction
- Opened: 14 August 1927

Tenant
- Kvik Halden FK

Halden Stadium is a multi-purpose stadium in the town of Halden in Norway. It is mainly used by the local football team Kvik Halden FK who play in the Norwegian Third Division. It is an exceptionally good quality stadium for this level of football and is also used occasionally by the Norway U21 and U19 sides.

== Facilities ==
The stadium's capacity is 5000 and comprises two stands running along the sides of the pitch. The larger stand is a new construction with 2500 seats. The smaller stand is older and has 1500 uncovered seats. There is also standing room at either end of the pitch for around 1000 people.

== Events ==
The record attendance for the stadium is 6,717 spectators for a game between Ørn Horten and Lyn Oslo for the 1928 Norwegian Cup Final. The venue has hosted Norway national under-21 football team matches twice, playing 1–2 against Sweden on 12 August 1981 and 1–1 against Romania on 23 May 1991.
