= Michael Røn =

Danish-born Norwegian footballer (born 1984)

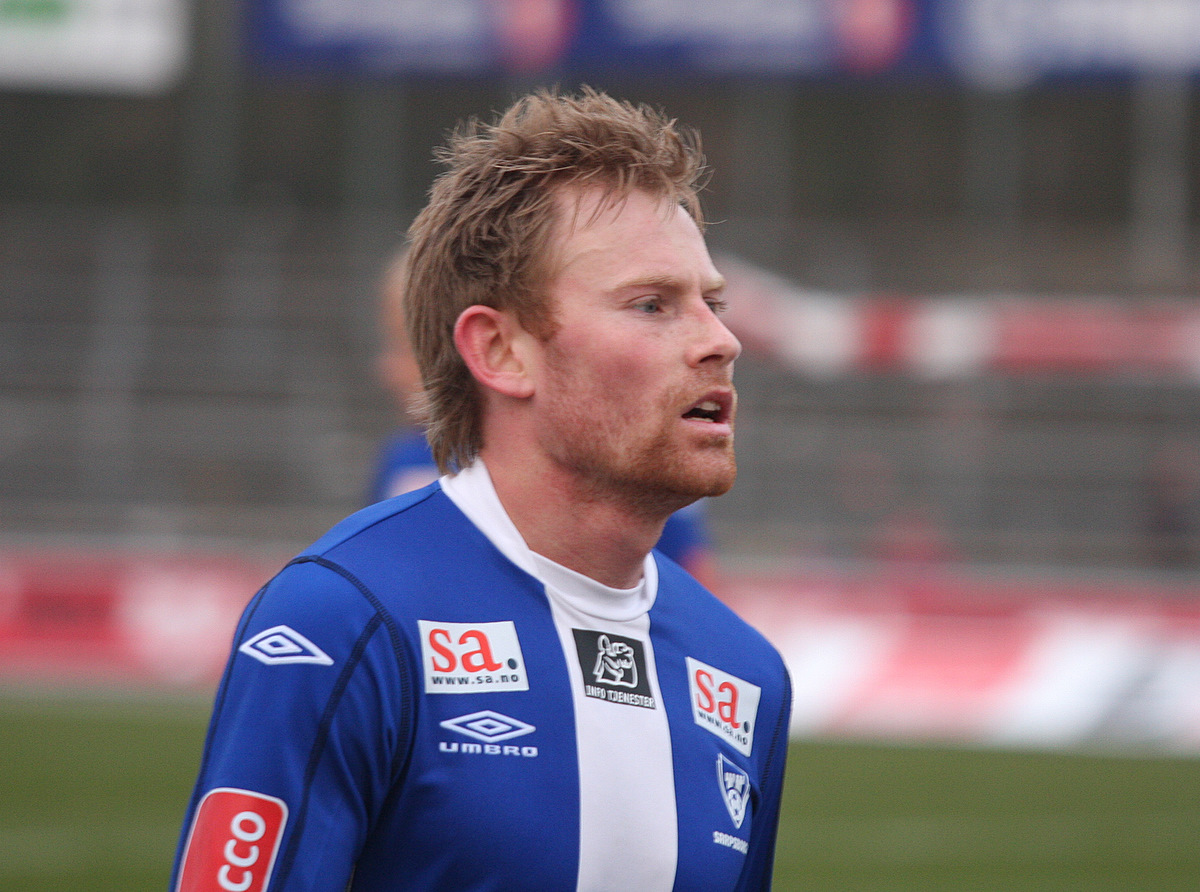

Personal information
- Full name: Michael Røn
- Date of birth: 25 July 1984 (age 42)
- Place of birth: Århus, Danmark
- Height: 1.79 m (5 ft 10 in)
- Position: Midfielder

Team information
- Current team: Kråkerøy
- Number: 23

Senior career*
Years	Team	Apps	(Gls)
2003–2007	Fredrikstad	29	(1)
2007	→ Drøbak/Frogn (loan)		(11)
2008–2013	Sarpsborg 08	95	(11)
2013–	Kråkerøy	2	(3)
- * Club domestic league appearances and goals as of 14 May 2013

Michael Alexander Juhl Røn (born 25 July 1984) is a Danish-born Norwegian footballer who play for Kråkerøy.

He joined Sparta in 2008, having previously played for Fredrikstad FK in the Norwegian Premier League. Before joining Fredrikstad he played for Borgen IL and Borg Fotball; he also had a spell for Drøbak-Frogn IL.

Outside of football he is a student at Østfold University College.

In July 2013 he decide to step down on football, because he had some injury during his time in Sarpsborg 08

== Career statistics ==
As of 14 May 2013

Season	Club	Division	League		Cup		Total	
Season	Club	Division	Apps	Goals	Apps	Goals	Apps	Goals
2003	Fredrikstad	Adeccoligaen	15	1	1	0	16	1
2004	Fredrikstad	Tippeligaen	0	0	1	0	1	0
2005	Fredrikstad	Tippeligaen	9	0	4	0	13	0
2006	Fredrikstad	Tippeligaen	5	0	2	3	7	3
2007	Fredrikstad	Tippeligaen	0	0	0	0	0	0
2008	Sarpsborg 08	Adeccoligaen	26	2	1	1	27	3
2009	Sarpsborg 08	Adeccoligaen	22	4	1	1	23	5
2010	Sarpsborg 08	Adeccoligaen	18	3	1	0	19	3
2011	Sarpsborg 08	Tippeligaen	16	2	3	0	19	2
2012	Sarpsborg 08	Adeccoligaen	11	0	1	0	12	0
2013	Sarpsborg 08	Tippeligaen	2	0	0	0	2	0
2013	Kråkerøy	3. divisjon	2	3	0	0	2	3
Career Total			126	15	15	5	141	20
