= Kvik Halden FK =

Norwegian football club

Kvik Halden
- Full name: Kvik Halden Fotballklubb
- Nickname: Kvik
- Founded: 19 June 1906; 120 years ago
- Ground: Halden stadion, Halden
- Capacity: 5,000 (4,000 seated)
- Chairman: John Erik Eriksen
- League: 2. divisjon
- 2025: 3. divisjon group 6, 1st of 14 (promoted)
| Home colours | Away colours |

Kvik Halden FK is a Norwegian football club, founded on 19 June 1906.

The club plays in the 2. divisjon after their promotion from the 2025 3. divisjon. In 2010 they contested a playoff to win promotion, and succeeded by beating Eik-Tønsberg 5–1 on aggregate. In 2019, they were close to achieve back-to-back promotions, but were defeated by fellow 2. divisjon runner up Åsane on aggregate in the promotion playoffs, whom then went on to defeat then 1. divisjon team Notodden on aggregate to get promoted.

In 1997, a merger between the two Halden-based clubs FK Kvik and Halden FK resulted in the formation of Kvik Halden FK. Long before the merger, FK Kvik was informally known as Kvik Halden anyway, to avoid confusion with the other FK Kvik from Trondheim. FK Kvik was the older and better of the two, but Halden FK had a rather large base of young players. The merger was controversial, and has been criticized by some who claim that the result of the merger was that FK Kvik simply took over Halden FK.

Kvik Halden's only major trophy came in 1918, when the club (then FK Kvik) won the Norwegian Cup, defeating Brann in the final. FK Kvik also played two other Cup Finals, in 1915 and 1922, but lost both, each time to Odd.

The 1910s and 20s was Kvik's glory days. In this period, the club had several players on the national team, and was one of the top clubs in Norwegian football. However, since the end of World War II, the team has never played in the highest football division, making Halden the second-largest town in Norway (behind Arendal) that has never had a top-division football team since a national league competition was established in 1948.

== Honours ==
- Norwegian Cup
  - Winners (1): 1918
  - Runners-up (2): 1915, 1922

== Recent history ==
| Season | League | Grp | Pos. | Pl. | W | D | L | GS | GA | P | Cup | Notes |
|---|---|---|---|---|---|---|---|---|---|---|---|---|
| 2009 | 3. divisjon | 1 | 1 | 26 | 23 | 2 | 1 | 99 | 9 | 71 | Second round | Lost play-off match for promotion |
| 2010 | 3. divisjon | 1 | ↑ 1 | 26 | 22 | 3 | 1 | 125 | 31 | 69 | First qualifying round | Promoted to the 2. divisjon |
| 2011 | 2. divisjon | 1 | 5 | 26 | 12 | 6 | 8 | 52 | 34 | 42 | Second round | |
| 2012 | 2. divisjon | 4 | 5 | 26 | 11 | 6 | 9 | 53 | 40 | 39 | Third round | |
| 2013 | 2. divisjon | 1 | 5 | 26 | 12 | 5 | 9 | 34 | 35 | 41 | Third round | |
| 2014 | 2. divisjon | 4 | 10 | 26 | 9 | 4 | 13 | 37 | 51 | 31 | First round | |
| 2015 | 2. divisjon | 2 | 3 | 26 | 16 | 5 | 5 | 59 | 25 | 53 | Fourth round | |
| 2016 | 2. divisjon | 4 | ↓ 9 | 26 | 10 | 6 | 10 | 47 | 50 | 36 | Second round | Relegated to the 3. divisjon |
| 2017 | 3. divisjon | 1 | 3 | 26 | 15 | 4 | 7 | 77 | 36 | 49 | Second round | |
| 2018 | 3. divisjon | 2 | ↑ 1 | 26 | 20 | 3 | 3 | 65 | 16 | 63 | First round | Promoted to the 2. divisjon |
| 2019 | 2. divisjon | 1 | 2 | 26 | 18 | 4 | 4 | 57 | 26 | 58 | Second round | Lost play-off match for promotion |
| 2020 | 2. divisjon | 1 | 5 | 17 | 9 | 2 | 6 | 37 | 31 | 29 | Cancelled | |
| 2021 | 2. divisjon | 1 | 7 | 26 | 12 | 5 | 9 | 46 | 48 | 41 | First round | |
| 2022 | 2. divisjon | 1 | 5 | 24 | 10 | 4 | 10 | 43 | 36 | 34 | Second round | |
| 2023 | 2. divisjon | 2 | 8 | 26 | 9 | 4 | 13 | 43 | 51 | 31 | Second round | |
| 2024 | 2. divisjon | 1 | ↓ 14 | 26 | 4 | 5 | 17 | 28 | 61 | 17 | First round | Relegated to the 3. divisjon |
| 2025 | 3. divisjon | 6 | ↑ 1 | 26 | 21 | 3 | 2 | 87 | 25 | 66 | First round | Promoted to the 2. divisjon |
| 2026 | 2. divisjon | 1 | | | | | | | | | First qualifying round | |

== Current squad ==
As of 1 September 2026. Note: Flags indicate national team as defined under FIFA eligibility rules; some limited exceptions apply. Players may hold more than one non-FIFA nationality.

| No. | Pos. | Nation | Player |
|---|---|---|---|
| 1 | GK | NOR | Petter Bønøgård |
| 3 | DF | NOR | Markus Grimstad |
| 4 | DF | DEN | Selius Gindeberg |
| 5 | DF | NOR | Fredrik Åsbø |
| 6 | DF | NOR | Ole Viktor Skjønberg-Nymo |
| 7 | MF | NOR | Erlind Krasniqi |
| 8 | MF | NOR | Marcus Moberg |
| 9 | FW | NOR | Øystein Næsheim |
| 10 | FW | NOR | Fabian Ness |
| 11 | DF | KOS | Adhurim Mjekiqi |
| 13 | FW | NOR | Youssef Chaib |
| 14 | MF | NOR | Uranik Seferi |
| 15 | MF | NOR | Almas Ayman Samrat (on loan from Skeid) |

| No. | Pos. | Nation | Player |
|---|---|---|---|
| 16 | FW | NOR | Peter Degnes (on loan from KFUM-Oslo) |
| 17 | DF | NOR | Dardan Mehmeti |
| 18 | FW | NOR | Jesper Wichstrøm Johansen |
| 19 | FW | NOR | Alexander Puck |
| 21 | MF | NOR | Markus Manirakiza |
| 23 | MF | NOR | Mathias Engebretsen |
| 30 | MF | NOR | Szymon Roguski (on loan from Sarpsborg) |
| 33 | GK | LAT | Stefans Keiss |
| 38 | MF | NOR | Dino Sarotic (on loan from Skeid) |
| 41 | MF | NOR | Nikolai Solberg |
| 47 | DF | NOR | Kristian Lorentzen |
| 77 | DF | NOR | Adam Kaszuba (on loan from Sarpsborg) |
| 80 | MF | DEN | Frederik Kristensen |

=== Out on loan ===
Note: Flags indicate national team as defined under FIFA eligibility rules; some limited exceptions apply. Players may hold more than one non-FIFA nationality.

| No. | Pos. | Nation | Player |
|---|---|---|---|
| 27 | FW | NOR | Erlend Cantona Vidtun-Olsen (at Sarpsborg II until 30 November 2026) |
