= Mathias Engebretsen =

Norwegian footballer (born 1993)

Personal information
- Date of birth: 24 January 1993 (age 33)
- Place of birth: Halden, Norway
- Height: 1.70 m (5 ft 7 in)
- Position: Defensive midfielder

Team information
- Current team: Kvik Halden
- Number: 23

Youth career
- 2007: Berg IL
- 2008–2011: Sarpsborg 08

Senior career*
Years	Team	Apps	(Gls)
2011–2013	Sarpsborg 08	12	(0)
2013	→ Moss (loan)	8	(1)
2014–2016	Kvik Halden	75	(8)
2017	Vindbjart FK	22	(1)
2018–2023	Kvik Halden	130	(5)
2024	Råde	24	(4)
2025–	Kvik Halden	25	(2)
- * Club domestic league appearances and goals as of 15 November 2026

Mathias Engebretsen (born 24 January 1993) is a Norwegian footballer who is playing as a defensive midfielder for Kvik Halden FK.

Hailing from Sponvika, he started his career in Berg IL, and went on to sign for larger clubs in the district, along with Simen Standerholden and Ole Strømsborg. Engebretsen started his senior career in Sarpsborg 08 FF. The team alternated between the first and second tier, but Engebretsen appeared in the Norwegian Premier League four times in 2011 and once in 2013.

Engebretsen was also loaned out to Moss FK in 2013. Ahead of the 2014 season he joined Kvik Halden FK.
