= List of Norwegian football transfers winter 2013–14 =

This is a list of Norwegian football transfers in the winter transfer window 2013–14 by club. Only clubs of the 2014 Tippeligaen and the 2014 Norwegian First Division are included.

== 2014 Tippeligaen ==
=== Aalesund ===
In: Note: Flags indicate national team as defined under FIFA eligibility rules; some limited exceptions apply. Players may hold more than one non-FIFA nationality.

| No. | Pos. | Nation | Player |
|---|---|---|---|
| — | DF | SWE | Mikael Dyrestam (from (Sweden) IFK Göteborg) |
| — | DF | NOR | Oddbjørn Lie (from HamKam) |
| — | GK | NOR | Andreas Lie (loan return from Hødd) |
| — | MF | FIN | Sakari Mattila (from (Finland) HJK) |
| — | DF | NGR | Akeem Latifu (loan from Hødd made permanent) |

Out: Note: Flags indicate national team as defined under FIFA eligibility rules; some limited exceptions apply. Players may hold more than one non-FIFA nationality.

| No. | Pos. | Nation | Player |
|---|---|---|---|
| — | DF | NOR | Edvard Skagestad (to (Sweden) IFK Norrköping) |
| — | MF | NOR | Lars Fuhre (to (Sweden) Hammarby) |
| — | GK | NOR | Lasse Staw (to Bodø/Glimt) |
| — | FW | MAR | Abderrazak Hamdallah (to (China) Guangzhou R&F) |
| — | MF | MAR | Houcine Zidoune (loan return to (Morocco) Olympique Safi) |
| — | DF | NOR | Andreas Nordvik (to Sarpsborg 08) |

=== Bodø/Glimt ===
In: Note: Flags indicate national team as defined under FIFA eligibility rules; some limited exceptions apply. Players may hold more than one non-FIFA nationality.

| No. | Pos. | Nation | Player |
|---|---|---|---|
| — | FW | NOR | Trond Olsen (from Viking) |
| — | DF | NOR | Kristian Brix (from Sandefjord) |
| — | GK | NOR | Lasse Staw (from Aalesund) |
| — | MF | NGR | Dominic Chatto (from (Sweden) Häcken) |
| — | DF | NOR | Brede Moe (loan from Rosenborg) |

Out: Note: Flags indicate national team as defined under FIFA eligibility rules; some limited exceptions apply. Players may hold more than one non-FIFA nationality.

| No. | Pos. | Nation | Player |
|---|---|---|---|
| — | MF | NOR | Christian Berg (to Fredrikstad) |
| — | GK | SWE | Viktor Noring |

=== Brann ===
In: Note: Flags indicate national team as defined under FIFA eligibility rules; some limited exceptions apply. Players may hold more than one non-FIFA nationality.

| No. | Pos. | Nation | Player |
|---|---|---|---|
| — | DF | NOR | Vadim Demidov (from (Russia) Anzhi Makhachkala) |
| — | FW | SEN | Ibrahima Dramé (from (Senegal) Casa Sports) |
| — | DF | NOR | Jonas Grønner (loan return from (Iceland) KR) |
| — | DF | NOR | Erlend Hanstveit (from (Sweden) Helsingborg) |
| — | FW | SWE | Jakob Orlov (from (Sweden) Gefle) |

Out: Note: Flags indicate national team as defined under FIFA eligibility rules; some limited exceptions apply. Players may hold more than one non-FIFA nationality.

| No. | Pos. | Nation | Player |
|---|---|---|---|
| — | FW | NOR | Bård Finne (to (Germany) 1. FC Köln) |
| — | GK | NOR | Jørgen Mohus (to Bærum) |
| — | DF | NOR | Henrik Gjesdal (loan to Nest-Sotra) |
| — | DF | NOR | Simen Wangberg (to Tromsø) |
| — | FW | AUT | Martin Pušić (to (Denmark) Esbjerg) |
| — | FW | GHA | Kennedy Ashia (loan return to (Ghana) Liberty Professionals) |
| — | MF | NOR | Kjetil Kalve (to Nest-Sotra) |
| — | MF | NOR | Tomasz Sokolowski (loan to Stabæk) |

=== Haugesund ===
In: Note: Flags indicate national team as defined under FIFA eligibility rules; some limited exceptions apply. Players may hold more than one non-FIFA nationality.

| No. | Pos. | Nation | Player |
|---|---|---|---|
| — | FW | NOR | Torbjørn Agdestein (from (Scotland) Inverness CT) |
| — | DF | SLO | Rok Elsner (from (Greece) Aris) |
| — | FW | SWE | Pontus Engblom (loan return from (Sweden) GIF Sundsvall) |
| — | FW | SWE | Maic Sema (loan return from (Netherlands) MVV Maastricht) |
| — | MF | NOR | Alexander Stølås (from Vard Haugesund) |
| — | MF | UGA | Tonny Mawejje (from (Iceland) ÍBV) |

Out: Note: Flags indicate national team as defined under FIFA eligibility rules; some limited exceptions apply. Players may hold more than one non-FIFA nationality.

| No. | Pos. | Nation | Player |
|---|---|---|---|
| — | FW | NOR | Henrik Kjelsrud Johansen (to Odd) |
| — | DF | SLE | Umaru Bangura (to (Belarus) Dinamo Minsk) |
| — | MF | NOR | Trygve Nygaard (retired) |

=== Lillestrøm ===
In: Note: Flags indicate national team as defined under FIFA eligibility rules; some limited exceptions apply. Players may hold more than one non-FIFA nationality.

| No. | Pos. | Nation | Player |
|---|---|---|---|
| — | FW | NOR | Tommy Høiland (loan from Molde) |
| — | MF | NOR | Marius Lundemo (from Bærum) |
| — | MF | NOR | Simen Kind Mikalsen (from Ull/Kisa) |
| — | DF | NOR | Magnar Ødegaard (loan from Molde extended) |

Out: Note: Flags indicate national team as defined under FIFA eligibility rules; some limited exceptions apply. Players may hold more than one non-FIFA nationality.

| No. | Pos. | Nation | Player |
|---|---|---|---|
| — | DF | NOR | Marius Høibråten (to Strømsgodset) |
| — | FW | NOR | Thorstein Helstad |
| — | DF | NOR | Isak Scheel (free agent) |
| — | MF | AUT | Thomas Piermayr (free agent) |
| — | DF | SWE | Fredrik Stoor (to (Denmark) Viborg) |
| — | MF | NOR | Markus Furseth (to Ull/Kisa) |
| — | MF | NOR | Joakim Holmedal (to Ull/Kisa) |

=== Molde ===
In: Note: Flags indicate national team as defined under FIFA eligibility rules; some limited exceptions apply. Players may hold more than one non-FIFA nationality.

| No. | Pos. | Nation | Player |
|---|---|---|---|
| — | FW | ISL | Björn Bergmann Sigurðarson (on loan from (England) Wolverhampton) |
| — | MF | NOR | Harmeet Singh (from (Netherlands) Feyenoord) |
| — | FW | NOR | Mohamed Elyounoussi (from Sarpsborg 08) |
| — | FW | SEN | Pape Paté Diouf (from (Denmark) FC København) |

Out: Note: Flags indicate national team as defined under FIFA eligibility rules; some limited exceptions apply. Players may hold more than one non-FIFA nationality.

| No. | Pos. | Nation | Player |
|---|---|---|---|
| — | FW | NOR | Jo Inge Berget (to (Wales) Cardiff) |
| — | MF | NOR | Mats Møller Dæhli (to (Wales) Cardiff) |
| — | DF | NOR | Kristoffer Paulsen Vatshaug (retired) |
| — | DF | NOR | Børre Steenslid (retired) |
| — | MF | NOR | Zlatko Tripić (to Start) |
| — | GK | SWE | Ole Söderberg (to (Sweden) Kalmar) |
| — | DF | NOR | Magnar Ødegaard (loan to Lillestrøm extended) |
| — | FW | NOR | Tommy Høiland (loan to Lillestrøm) |
| — | MF | NOR | Magnus Stamnestrø (loan to Kristiansund) |
| — | MF | NOR | Pål Erik Ulvestad (to Kristiansund) |
| — | FW | SEN | Aliou Coly (loan to Kristiansund) |
| — | FW | USA | Ben Spencer (loan to (United States) Indy Eleven) |
| — | DF | NOR | Ivar Furu (loan to (Iceland) KR) |

=== Odd ===
In: Note: Flags indicate national team as defined under FIFA eligibility rules; some limited exceptions apply. Players may hold more than one non-FIFA nationality.

| No. | Pos. | Nation | Player |
|---|---|---|---|
| — | FW | NOR | Henrik Kjelsrud Johansen (from Haugesund) |
| — | DF | FIN | Jarkko Hurme (from (Finland) TPS) |
| — | FW | NGR | Chukwuma Akabueze (from (China) Wuhan Zall) |
| — | MF | NOR | Jonathan Lindseth (from Pors) |

Out: Note: Flags indicate national team as defined under FIFA eligibility rules; some limited exceptions apply. Players may hold more than one non-FIFA nationality.

| No. | Pos. | Nation | Player |
|---|---|---|---|
| — | MF | NOR | Morten Fevang (to Notodden) |
| — | DF | NOR | Niklas Gunnarsson (to Vålerenga) |
| — | FW | NOR | Snorre Krogsgård (to Fram) |
| — | FW | SWE | Mattias Andersson (retired) |
| — | MF | NGR | George White Agwuocha (loan to Strømmen made permanent) |

=== Rosenborg ===
In: Note: Flags indicate national team as defined under FIFA eligibility rules; some limited exceptions apply. Players may hold more than one non-FIFA nationality.

| No. | Pos. | Nation | Player |
|---|---|---|---|
| — | MF | NOR | Morten Gamst Pedersen (from (Turkey) Karabükspor) |
| — | FW | FIN | Riku Riski (from Hønefoss) |
| — | GK | NOR | Lars Stubhaug (from Strømsgodset) |
| — | MF | NOR | Bent Sørmo (from Levanger) |

Out: Note: Flags indicate national team as defined under FIFA eligibility rules; some limited exceptions apply. Players may hold more than one non-FIFA nationality.

| No. | Pos. | Nation | Player |
|---|---|---|---|
| — | MF | ESA | Jaime Alas (to (Mexico) Ballenas Galeana) |
| — | GK | NOR | Erik Mellevold Bråthen (free agent) |
| — | DF | NOR | Jon Inge Høiland (to Stabæk) |
| — | MF | NOR | Fredrik Midtsjø (loan to Sandnes Ulf) |
| — | DF | NOR | Brede Moe (loan to Bodø/Glimt) |

=== Sandnes Ulf ===
In: Note: Flags indicate national team as defined under FIFA eligibility rules; some limited exceptions apply. Players may hold more than one non-FIFA nationality.

| No. | Pos. | Nation | Player |
|---|---|---|---|
| — | GK | ISL | Hannes Þór Halldórsson (from (Iceland) KR) |
| — | FW | CHI | Diego Rubio (loan from (Portugal) Sporting) |
| — | MF | NOR | Fredrik Midtsjø (loan from Rosenborg) |
| — | DF | FRA | Derek Decamps (from (France) Angers) |
| — | DF | SWE | Emil Johansson (from (Netherlands) Groningen) |
| — | MF | GAM | Tijan Jaiteh (from Sandefjord) |
| — | MF | FRA | Malaury Martin (from (Switzerland) Lausanne-Sport) |
| — | FW | NOR | Ole Kristian Langås (from Ull/Kisa) |
| — | FW | NOR | Kent Håvard Eriksen (from Elverum) |

Out: Note: Flags indicate national team as defined under FIFA eligibility rules; some limited exceptions apply. Players may hold more than one non-FIFA nationality.

| No. | Pos. | Nation | Player |
|---|---|---|---|
| — | MF | ISL | Steinþór Freyr Þorsteinsson (to Viking) |
| — | MF | NOR | Fredrik Torsteinbø (to (Sweden) Hammarby) |
| — | DF | SRB | Miloš Mihajlov (to (Serbia) Voždovac) |
| — | FW | SRB | Nemanja Jovanović (to (Kazakhstan) Spartak Semey) |
| — | GK | NOR | Aslak Falch (to Hødd) |
| — | DF | SWE | Johnny Lundberg (to (Sweden) Landskrona) |
| — | DF | NOR | Steffen Haugland (to Randaberg) |
| — | DF | NOR | Nils Petter Andersen (to Fløy) |

=== Sarpsborg 08 ===
In: Note: Flags indicate national team as defined under FIFA eligibility rules; some limited exceptions apply. Players may hold more than one non-FIFA nationality.

| No. | Pos. | Nation | Player |
|---|---|---|---|
| — | MF | SRB | Bojan Zajić (from Vålerenga) |
| — | MF | NOR | Kristoffer Tokstad (from Strømmen) |
| — | FW | CIV | Franck Dja Djédjé (from (Ukraine) Chornomorets) |
| — | DF | NOR | Joachim Thomassen (from Vålerenga) |
| — | DF | NOR | Andreas Nordvik (from Aalesund) |

Out: Note: Flags indicate national team as defined under FIFA eligibility rules; some limited exceptions apply. Players may hold more than one non-FIFA nationality.

| No. | Pos. | Nation | Player |
|---|---|---|---|
| — | DF | NOR | Berat Jusufi (to Moss) |
| — | FW | NOR | Mohamed Elyounoussi (to Molde) |
| — | MF | NOR | Magnus Sylling Olsen (to HamKam) |
| — | DF | FRA | Derek Decamps (loan return to (France) Angers) |
| — | DF | ESP | Álvaro Baigorri (to Moss) |
| — | GK | ISL | Haraldur Björnsson (loan to Strømmen) |
| — | MF | NOR | Tobias Henanger (to Kongsvinger) |
| — | MF | NOR | Mathias Engebretsen (to Kvik Halden) |

=== Sogndal ===
In: Note: Flags indicate national team as defined under FIFA eligibility rules; some limited exceptions apply. Players may hold more than one non-FIFA nationality.

| No. | Pos. | Nation | Player |
|---|---|---|---|
| — | MF | NOR | Ørjan Hopen (loan return from Bryne) |
| — | DF | ISL | Hjörtur Logi Valgarðsson (from (Sweden) IFK Göteborg) |
| — | MF | NOR | Helge Haugen (from Hønefoss) |
| — | FW | NOR | Kristian Fardal Opseth (from Førde) |
| — | MF | NOR | Petter Strand (from Tertnes) |
| — | FW | NOR | Tim Nilsen (from Nest-Sotra) |

Out: Note: Flags indicate national team as defined under FIFA eligibility rules; some limited exceptions apply. Players may hold more than one non-FIFA nationality.

| No. | Pos. | Nation | Player |
|---|---|---|---|
| — | FW | SEN | Malick Mané (to (Sweden) IFK Göteborg) |
| — | MF | SEN | Sidy Sagna |
| — | MF | NOR | Magnus Stamnestrø (loan return to Molde) |
| — | DF | NOR | Anders Hella (to Fyllingsdalen) |
| — | MF | GHA | Gilbert Koomson (loan return to (Thailand) BEC Tero Sasana) |
| — | DF | NOR | Thomas Ness |
| — | DF | NOR | Espen Næss Lund (to Kristiansund) |
| — | DF | NOR | Eivind Daniel Røed |

=== Stabæk ===
In: Note: Flags indicate national team as defined under FIFA eligibility rules; some limited exceptions apply. Players may hold more than one non-FIFA nationality.

| No. | Pos. | Nation | Player |
|---|---|---|---|
| — | MF | GHA | Enoch Kofi Adu (loan from (Belgium) Club Brugge) |
| — | MF | NOR | Emil Dahle (from Ham-Kam) |
| — | DF | ARG | Pablo Fontanello (from (Ukraine) Chornomorets Odesa) |
| — | DF | NZL | Craig Henderson (from (Sweden) Mjällby) |
| — | DF | NOR | Jon Inge Høiland (from Rosenborg) |
| — | MF | USA | Michael Stephens (from (United States) LA Galaxy) |
| — | MF | NOR | Tomasz Sokolowski (loan from Brann) |
| — | GK | NOR | Borger Thomas (loan from Strømsgodset) |

Out: Note: Flags indicate national team as defined under FIFA eligibility rules; some limited exceptions apply. Players may hold more than one non-FIFA nationality.

| No. | Pos. | Nation | Player |
|---|---|---|---|
| — | MF | NOR | Martin Andresen (retired) |
| — | FW | NOR | Chuma Anene (loan return to Vålerenga) |
| — | DF | NOR | Erik Benjaminsen (free transfer) |
| — | MF | LBN | Adnan Haidar (to Bryne) |
| — | MF | NOR | Bjarte Haugsdal (to Nest-Sotra) |
| — | DF | NOR | Thor Lange (to Strømmen) |
| — | GK | NOR | Jonathan Rasheed (to Alta) |
| — | MF | NOR | Herman Stengel (to Vålerenga) |
| — | FW | NOR | Mads Stokkelien (to (United States) New York Cosmos) |

=== Start ===
In: Note: Flags indicate national team as defined under FIFA eligibility rules; some limited exceptions apply. Players may hold more than one non-FIFA nationality.

| No. | Pos. | Nation | Player |
|---|---|---|---|
| — | DF | NOR | Robert Sandnes (from (Iceland) Selfoss) |
| — | MF | CRC | Fernando Paniagua (from (Costa Rica) Deportivo Saprissa) |
| — | MF | NOR | Zlatko Tripić (from Molde) |
| — | FW | NOR | Alexander Lind (from Donn) |
| — | DF | NOR | Jon Hodnemyr (from Vindbjart) |
| — | FW | NOR | John Olav Norheim (from Fløy) |
| — | DF | AUT | Markus Berger (from (Ukraine) Chornomorets Odesa) |

Out: Note: Flags indicate national team as defined under FIFA eligibility rules; some limited exceptions apply. Players may hold more than one non-FIFA nationality.

| No. | Pos. | Nation | Player |
|---|---|---|---|
| — | MF | FIN | Markus Heikkinen (to (Finland) HJK) |
| — | MF | NOR | Sondre Tronstad (to (England) Huddersfield) |
| — | DF | NOR | Birger Madsen (retired) |
| — | MF | NOR | Henrik Dahlum (to Jerv) |
| — | DF | NOR | Alain Delgado (to Jerv) |
| — | FW | NOR | Christian Tveit (to Nest-Sotra) |

=== Strømsgodset ===
In: Note: Flags indicate national team as defined under FIFA eligibility rules; some limited exceptions apply. Players may hold more than one non-FIFA nationality.

| No. | Pos. | Nation | Player |
|---|---|---|---|
| — | MF | GHA | Mohammed Abu (from (England) Manchester City) |
| — | DF | NOR | Marius Høibråten (from Lillestrøm) |
| — | MF | DEN | Patrick Olsen (loan from (Italy) Inter) |
| — | MF | POR | Francisco Júnior (loan from (England) Everton) |
| — | GK | BIH | Sead Ramović (from (Denmark) Vendsyssel) |

Out: Note: Flags indicate national team as defined under FIFA eligibility rules; some limited exceptions apply. Players may hold more than one non-FIFA nationality.

| No. | Pos. | Nation | Player |
|---|---|---|---|
| — | FW | NOR | Adama Diomande (to (Belarus) Dinamo Minsk) |
| — | MF | NOR | Abdisalam Ibrahim (loan return to (England) Manchester City) |
| — | MF | NOR | Stefan Johansen (to (Scotland) Celtic) |
| — | FW | NOR | Ola Kamara (to Austria Wien) |
| — | DF | GHA | Razak Nuhu (loan return to (England) Manchester City) |
| — | GK | NOR | Lars Stubhaug (to Rosenborg) |
| — | DF | NOR | Ole Amund Sveen (to Hødd) |
| — | GK | NOR | Borger Thomas (loan to Stabæk) |

=== Viking ===
In: Note: Flags indicate national team as defined under FIFA eligibility rules; some limited exceptions apply. Players may hold more than one non-FIFA nationality.

| No. | Pos. | Nation | Player |
|---|---|---|---|
| — | MF | NOR | Joackim Jørgensen (from (Sweden) Elfsborg) |
| — | GK | NOR | Iven Austbø (from Sandefjord) |
| — | MF | ISL | Steinþór Freyr Þorsteinsson (from Sandnes Ulf) |
| — | GK | NOR | Arild Østbø (loan return from Strømmen) |
| — | MF | ISL | Björn Daníel Sverrisson (from (Iceland) FH) |
| — | DF | ISL | Sverrir Ingi Ingason (from (Iceland) Breiðablik) |

Out: Note: Flags indicate national team as defined under FIFA eligibility rules; some limited exceptions apply. Players may hold more than one non-FIFA nationality.

| No. | Pos. | Nation | Player |
|---|---|---|---|
| — | DF | NOR | Johan Lædre Bjørdal (to (Denmark) AGF) |
| — | GK | NOR | Rune Jarstein (to (Germany) Hertha Berlin) |
| — | FW | SWE | Patrik Ingelsten (to (Sweden) Mjällby) |
| — | FW | NOR | Trond Olsen (to Bodø/Glimt) |
| — | MF | GHA | King Osei Gyan (to (Sweden) Halmstad) |
| — | FW | AUT | Benjamin Sulimani (to (Austria) Admira Wacker) |
| — | FW | EST | Henri Anier (loan to (Scotland) Motherwell made permanent) |
| — | MF | NOR | Jon-Helge Tveita (loan to Bryne made permanent) |
| — | MF | NOR | Eirik Schulze (to Strømmen) |
| — | FW | FRO | Jóan Símun Edmundsson (to (Faroe Islands) AB) |
| — | DF | COD | Richard Ekunde |
| — | GK | NOR | Christoffer Midbøe Lunde (to Sola) |

=== Vålerenga ===
In: Note: Flags indicate national team as defined under FIFA eligibility rules; some limited exceptions apply. Players may hold more than one non-FIFA nationality.

| No. | Pos. | Nation | Player |
|---|---|---|---|
| — | DF | NOR | Niklas Gunnarsson (from Odd) |
| — | MF | NOR | Sivert Heltne Nilsen (from Hødd) |
| — | DF | SWE | Rasmus Lindqvist (from (Sweden) Östersund) |
| — | MF | NOR | Ghayas Zahid (loan return from Ull/Kisa) |
| — | FW | NOR | Chuma Anene (loan return from Stabæk) |
| — | DF | NOR | Simon Larsen (loan return from Hønefoss) |
| — | FW | NOR | Alexander Mathisen (from Hønefoss) |
| — | MF | NOR | Herman Stengel (from Stabæk) |
| — | FW | ISL | Viðar Örn Kjartansson (from (Iceland) Fylkir) |
| — | DF | NOR | Ruben Kristiansen (from Tromsø) |

Out: Note: Flags indicate national team as defined under FIFA eligibility rules; some limited exceptions apply. Players may hold more than one non-FIFA nationality.

| No. | Pos. | Nation | Player |
|---|---|---|---|
| — | FW | NOR | Torgeir Børven (to (Netherlands) Twente) |
| — | MF | SRB | Bojan Zajić (to Sarpsborg 08) |
| — | MF | NGR | Fegor Ogude (to (Russia) Amkar Perm) |
| — | DF | CRC | Giancarlo González (to (United States) Columbus Crew) |
| — | DF | POL | Marcel Wawrzynkiewicz (to (Poland) Cracovia) |
| — | DF | CZE | Jan Lecjaks (loan return to (Switzerland) Young Boys) |
| — | MF | NOR | Jan Gunnar Solli (to (Sweden) Hammarby) |
| — | DF | NOR | Joachim Thomassen (to Sarpsborg 08) |
| — | FW | NOR | Chuma Anene (to Ull-Kisa) |
| — | FW | NOR | Shåresh Ahmadi (to Ull-Kisa) |
| — | DF | SWE | Joseph Baffo (to (Sweden) Halmstad) |
| — | FW | NOR | Monir Benmoussa (to Bærum) |

== 1. Divisjon ==
=== Alta ===
In: Note: Flags indicate national team as defined under FIFA eligibility rules; some limited exceptions apply. Players may hold more than one non-FIFA nationality.

| No. | Pos. | Nation | Player |
|---|---|---|---|
| — | MF | NOR | Tresor Egholm (from Lyn) |
| — | FW | NOR | Rune Ertsås (from Hødd) |
| — | DF | NOR | Jonas Fundingsrud (from Tromsø) |
| — | GK | NOR | Jonathan Rasheed (from Stabæk) |
| — | GK | NOR | Kjetil Thomassen (from Tverrelvdalen) |

Out: Note: Flags indicate national team as defined under FIFA eligibility rules; some limited exceptions apply. Players may hold more than one non-FIFA nationality.

| No. | Pos. | Nation | Player |
|---|---|---|---|
| — | GK | POL | Lukasz Jarosinski (to Hønefoss) |
| — | MF | NOR | Mihkku Måsø (to Finnsnes) |
| — | MF | NOR | Even Sjøgren (loan to Bossekop) |
| — | DF | NOR | Jørgen Richardsen (to Lyn) |

=== Bryne ===
In: Note: Flags indicate national team as defined under FIFA eligibility rules; some limited exceptions apply. Players may hold more than one non-FIFA nationality.

| No. | Pos. | Nation | Player |
|---|---|---|---|
| — | DF | GHA | Paul Addo (from Strømmen) |
| — | DF | NOR | Adnan Čaušević (from Tromsø) |
| — | MF | LBN | Adnan Haidar (from Stabæk) |
| — | MF | NOR | Jon-Helge Tveita (loan from Viking made permanent) |
| — | DF | NOR | Viljar Vevatne (from Viking (U19)) |
| — | MF | NOR | Robert Undheim (from Frøyland) |

Out: Note: Flags indicate national team as defined under FIFA eligibility rules; some limited exceptions apply. Players may hold more than one non-FIFA nationality.

| No. | Pos. | Nation | Player |
|---|---|---|---|
| — | MF | NOR | Ørjan Hopen (loan return to Sogndal) |
| — | MF | NOR | Esben Ertzeid (to Brodd) |
| — | DF | FRO | Rógvi Baldvinsson (to Ålgård) |
| — | MF | NOR | Geir Dahle Høyland (loan to Ålgård made permanent) |
| — | MF | NOR | Håvard Urstad (retired) |

=== Bærum ===
In: Note: Flags indicate national team as defined under FIFA eligibility rules; some limited exceptions apply. Players may hold more than one non-FIFA nationality.

| No. | Pos. | Nation | Player |
|---|---|---|---|
| — | FW | NOR | Jan Banan Tømmernes (from Kristiansund) |
| — | MF | NOR | Andreas Aalbu (from Kristiansund) |
| — | FW | NOR | Monir Benmoussa (from Vålerenga) |
| — | GK | NOR | Jørgen Mohus (from Brann) |
| — | FW | NOR | Andreas Nedrebø (from HamKam) |
| — | DF | SWE | Mattias Pedersen (from (Sweden) Västra Frölunda) |
| — | MF | NOR | Kristoffer Tollås (from Asker) |

Out: Note: Flags indicate national team as defined under FIFA eligibility rules; some limited exceptions apply. Players may hold more than one non-FIFA nationality.

| No. | Pos. | Nation | Player |
|---|---|---|---|
| — | MF | NOR | Marius Lundemo (to Lillestrøm) |
| — | DF | NOR | Edo Colic (to Holmen) |
| — | FW | NOR | Erblin Llullaku (to Holmen) |
| — | FW | NOR | Magnus Ask Mikkelsen (to Fløy) |

=== Fredrikstad ===
In: Note: Flags indicate national team as defined under FIFA eligibility rules; some limited exceptions apply. Players may hold more than one non-FIFA nationality.

| No. | Pos. | Nation | Player |
|---|---|---|---|
| — | MF | NOR | Christian Berg (from Bodø/Glimt) |
| — | FW | NOR | Steffen Nystrøm (from Tromsø) |
| — | FW | NOR | Dag Alexander Olsen (from (Spain) CD Castellón) |
| — | MF | NOR | Bjørnar Holmvik (from (Sweden) Kalmar) |

Out: Note: Flags indicate national team as defined under FIFA eligibility rules; some limited exceptions apply. Players may hold more than one non-FIFA nationality.

| No. | Pos. | Nation | Player |
|---|---|---|---|
| — | MF | NOR | Hans Erik Ramberg (retired) |
| — | MF | SLE | Khalifa Jabbie (to (Turkey) Balıkesirspor) |
| — | MF | NOR | Thomas Holm (to Nordstrand) |
| — | MF | SWE | Andreas Landgren (to (Sweden) Helsingborg) |
| — | DF | NOR | Ole Strømsborg (to Kvik Halden) |
| — | GK | ISL | Haraldur Björnsson (loan return to Sarpsborg 08) |
| — | FW | GAM | Alagie Sosseh (to Mjøndalen) |

=== HamKam ===
In: Note: Flags indicate national team as defined under FIFA eligibility rules; some limited exceptions apply. Players may hold more than one non-FIFA nationality.

| No. | Pos. | Nation | Player |
|---|---|---|---|
| — | MF | FIN | Pekka Lagerblom (from (Finland) IFK Mariehamn) |
| — | MF | NOR | Magnus Sylling Olsen (from Sarpsborg 08) |
| — | DF | FRA | Christophe Psyché (from Kristiansund) |

Out: Note: Flags indicate national team as defined under FIFA eligibility rules; some limited exceptions apply. Players may hold more than one non-FIFA nationality.

| No. | Pos. | Nation | Player |
|---|---|---|---|
| — | DF | NOR | Edmir Asani |
| — | MF | NOR | Vegar Bjerke (retired) |
| — | MF | NOR | Emil Dahle (to Stabæk) |
| — | DF | NOR | Oddbjørn Lie (to Aalesund) |
| — | MF | NOR | Andreas Nedrebø (to Bærum) |
| — | MF | NOR | Sigurd Bølla Riseng |
| — | GK | NOR | Ivar Rønningen (retired) |
| — | FW | NOR | Niklas Solhaug (to Asker) |

=== Hødd ===
In: Note: Flags indicate national team as defined under FIFA eligibility rules; some limited exceptions apply. Players may hold more than one non-FIFA nationality.

| No. | Pos. | Nation | Player |
|---|---|---|---|
| — | MF | NOR | Eirik Ulland Andersen (loan from Vard Haugesund made permanent) |
| — | GK | NOR | Aslak Falch (from Sandnes Ulf) |
| — | MF | NIR | Robin Shroot (from (England) Stevenage) |
| — | DF | NOR | Ole Amund Sveen (from Strømsgodset) |
| — | MF | SWE | Joakim Wrele (loan from (Sweden) Halmstad) |

Out: Note: Flags indicate national team as defined under FIFA eligibility rules; some limited exceptions apply. Players may hold more than one non-FIFA nationality.

| No. | Pos. | Nation | Player |
|---|---|---|---|
| — | FW | NOR | Rune Ertsås (to Alta) |
| — | DF | NGR | Akeem Latifu (loan to Aalesund made permanent) |
| — | GK | NOR | Andreas Lie (loan return to Aalesund) |
| — | MF | NOR | Sivert Heltne Nilsen (to Vålerenga) |
| — | DF | NOR | Tobias Vibe (loan to Tromsdalen) |

=== Hønefoss ===
In: Note: Flags indicate national team as defined under FIFA eligibility rules; some limited exceptions apply. Players may hold more than one non-FIFA nationality.

| No. | Pos. | Nation | Player |
|---|---|---|---|
| — | GK | POL | Lukasz Jarosinski (from Alta) |
| — | FW | CIV | Kevin Beugré (loan return from Mjøndalen) |
| — | MF | NOR | Christian Aas (from Ull/Kisa) |
| — | MF | NOR | Kamer Qaka (from Raufoss) |
| — | FW | FIN | Roope Riski (from (Italy) Cesena) |

Out: Note: Flags indicate national team as defined under FIFA eligibility rules; some limited exceptions apply. Players may hold more than one non-FIFA nationality.

| No. | Pos. | Nation | Player |
|---|---|---|---|
| — | MF | NOR | Helge Haugen (to Sogndal) |
| — | FW | FIN | Riku Riski (to Rosenborg) |
| — | DF | NOR | Simon Larsen (loan return to Vålerenga) |
| — | DF | NOR | Kevin Larsen (to Sandefjord) |
| — | MF | NOR | Erik Midtgarden (to Mjøndalen) |
| — | MF | NOR | Tor Øyvind Hovda (to (Sweden) Kalmar FF) |
| — | FW | NOR | Alexander Mathisen (to Vålerenga) |
| — | GK | USA | Steve Clark (to (United States) Columbus Crew) |

=== Kristiansund ===
In: Note: Flags indicate national team as defined under FIFA eligibility rules; some limited exceptions apply. Players may hold more than one non-FIFA nationality.

| No. | Pos. | Nation | Player |
|---|---|---|---|
| — | MF | ESP | Marc Serramitja (free agent) |
| — | DF | NOR | Pål Erik Ulvestad (from Molde) |
| — | FW | SEN | Aliou Coly (loan from Molde) |
| — | MF | NOR | Magnus Stamnestrø (loan from Molde) |
| — | DF | NOR | Espen Næss Lund (from Sogndal) |
| — | GK | SWE | Conny Månsson (from Fløy) |
| — | MF | NOR | Jonas Rønningen (from Træff) |
| — | DF | NOR | Simon Tomren (from Træff) |
| — | FW | CIV | Daouda Karaboko Bamba (from Kongsvinger) |

Out: Note: Flags indicate national team as defined under FIFA eligibility rules; some limited exceptions apply. Players may hold more than one non-FIFA nationality.

| No. | Pos. | Nation | Player |
|---|---|---|---|
| — | DF | FRA | Christophe Psyché (to HamKam) |
| — | MF | NOR | Andreas Aalbu (to Bærum) |
| — | FW | NOR | Jan Banan Tømmernes (to Bærum) |
| — | MF | NOR | Roger Risholt (to Sandefjord) |
| — | GK | NOR | Roger Berntzen |
| — | FW | NOR | Mahmoud El Haj (to Strømmen) |
| — | FW | NOR | Simon Markeng (to Træff) |
| — | DF | FRA | Olivier N'Siabamfumu |
| — | MF | NOR | Sindre Ohrstrand (to Byåsen) |
| — | DF | NOR | Torbjørn Vik |
| — | FW | NOR | Victor Ashby |

=== Mjøndalen ===
In: Note: Flags indicate national team as defined under FIFA eligibility rules; some limited exceptions apply. Players may hold more than one non-FIFA nationality.

| No. | Pos. | Nation | Player |
|---|---|---|---|
| — | MF | NOR | Erik Midtgarden (from Hønefoss) |
| — | FW | DEN | Sanel Kapidžić (from Vard Haugesund) |
| — | FW | GAM | Alagie Sosseh (from Fredrikstad) |
| — | DF | NOR | Ulrik Arneberg (from Asker) |
| — | MF | NOR | Stian Rasch (from Strømmen) |
| — | DF | NOR | Karanveer Grewal (loan return from Asker) |
| — | MF | SWE | Anderas Haglund (from (Sweden) Degerfors) |

Out: Note: Flags indicate national team as defined under FIFA eligibility rules; some limited exceptions apply. Players may hold more than one non-FIFA nationality.

| No. | Pos. | Nation | Player |
|---|---|---|---|
| — | FW | NOR | Pål Alexander Kirkevold (to Sandefjord) |
| — | DF | USA | Jonathan Borrajo (to (United States) San Antonio Scorpions) |
| — | MF | NOR | Lars Granaas (retired) |
| — | DF | NOR | Kristian Flittie Onstad (to Moss) |
| — | FW | CIV | Kevin Beugré (loan return to Hønefoss) |
| — | FW | NOR | Benjamin Stokke (to Levanger) |
| — | FW | NOR | Jarle Belaska |

=== Nest-Sotra ===
In: Note: Flags indicate national team as defined under FIFA eligibility rules; some limited exceptions apply. Players may hold more than one non-FIFA nationality.

| No. | Pos. | Nation | Player |
|---|---|---|---|
| — | MF | NOR | Øystein Aksnes (from Åsane) |
| — | GK | NOR | Andreas Eikum (from Moss) |
| — | DF | NOR | Henrik Gjesdal (loan from Brann) |
| — | MF | NOR | Marius Hagen (from Notodden) |
| — | FW | NOR | Joakim Hammersland (from Åsane) |
| — | MF | NOR | Preben Hammersland (from Strindheim) |
| — | MF | NOR | Bjarte Haugsdal (from Stabæk) |
| — | MF | NOR | Kjetil Kalve (from Brann) |
| — | DF | NOR | Mads Songve (from Fana) |
| — | FW | NOR | Christian Tveit (from Start) |

Out: Note: Flags indicate national team as defined under FIFA eligibility rules; some limited exceptions apply. Players may hold more than one non-FIFA nationality.

| No. | Pos. | Nation | Player |
|---|---|---|---|
| — | MF | NOR | Nick Rios Haugen |
| — | MF | NOR | Erik Kanestrøm (to Os) |
| — | FW | NOR | Tim Nilsen (to Sogndal) |
| — | FW | THA | Kittiphong Pluemjai (to (Thailand) Buriram United) |

=== Ranheim ===
In: Note: Flags indicate national team as defined under FIFA eligibility rules; some limited exceptions apply. Players may hold more than one non-FIFA nationality.

| No. | Pos. | Nation | Player |

Out: Note: Flags indicate national team as defined under FIFA eligibility rules; some limited exceptions apply. Players may hold more than one non-FIFA nationality.

| No. | Pos. | Nation | Player |
|---|---|---|---|
| — | FW | NOR | Michael Karlsen (to (Norway) Rødde) |

=== Sandefjord ===
In: Note: Flags indicate national team as defined under FIFA eligibility rules; some limited exceptions apply. Players may hold more than one non-FIFA nationality.

| No. | Pos. | Nation | Player |
|---|---|---|---|
| — | FW | NOR | Pål Alexander Kirkevold (from Mjøndalen) |
| — | GK | NOR | Eirik Holmen Johansen (loan from (England) Manchester City) |
| — | DF | NOR | Kevin Larsen (from Hønefoss) |
| — | MF | NOR | Roger Risholt (from Kristiansund) |
| — | MF | NOR | Kristoffer Normann Hansen (loan return from Fram Larvik) |

Out: Note: Flags indicate national team as defined under FIFA eligibility rules; some limited exceptions apply. Players may hold more than one non-FIFA nationality.

| No. | Pos. | Nation | Player |
|---|---|---|---|
| — | GK | NOR | Iven Austbø (to Viking) |
| — | DF | NOR | Kristian Brix (to Bodø/Glimt) |
| — | MF | GAM | Tijan Jaiteh (to Sandnes Ulf) |
| — | MF | BIH | Fenan Salčinović (to (Bosnia and Herzegovina) Čelik) |
| — | DF | NOR | Tom Skogsrud (to Kongsvinger) |
| — | MF | NOR | Henrik Gustavsen (to Notodden) |

=== Strømmen ===
In: Note: Flags indicate national team as defined under FIFA eligibility rules; some limited exceptions apply. Players may hold more than one non-FIFA nationality.

| No. | Pos. | Nation | Player |
|---|---|---|---|
| — | GK | NOR | Stian Bolstad (from Fjellhamar) |
| — | GK | ISL | Haraldur Björnsson (loan from Sarpsborg 08) |
| — | GK | NOR | Samuel Discher (from Start) |
| — | FW | NOR | Mahmoud El Haj (from Kristiansund) |
| — | DF | NOR | Johannes Grødtlieb (from own junior squad) |
| — | DF | NOR | Kristian Jahr (from Notodden) |
| — | DF | NOR | Thor Lange (from Stabæk) |
| — | MF | NOR | Ulrich Ness (from own junior squad) |
| — | FW | NOR | Martin Ramsland (loan from Mandalskameratene made permanent) |
| — | MF | NOR | Esben Rashid (from KFUM Oslo) |
| — | MF | NOR | Eirik Schulze (from Viking) |
| — | MF | NGR | George White Agwuocha (loan from Odd made permanent) |

Out: Note: Flags indicate national team as defined under FIFA eligibility rules; some limited exceptions apply. Players may hold more than one non-FIFA nationality.

| No. | Pos. | Nation | Player |
|---|---|---|---|
| — | DF | GHA | Paul Addo (to Bryne) |
| — | FW | NOR | Kim André Brandtzæg (to Asker) |
| — | FW | ISR | Dan Alberto Fellus (to Lørenskog) |
| — | MF | GER | Hannes Hain (free transfer) |
| — | FW | NOR | Simen Stamsø Møller (to Kjelsås) |
| — | DF | NOR | Henrik Nordnes (retired) |
| — | MF | NOR | Stian Rasch (to Mjøndalen) |
| — | MF | NOR | Kristoffer Tokstad (to Sarpsborg 08) |
| — | GK | NOR | Arild Østbø (to Viking) |

=== Tromsdalen ===
In: Note: Flags indicate national team as defined under FIFA eligibility rules; some limited exceptions apply. Players may hold more than one non-FIFA nationality.

| No. | Pos. | Nation | Player |
|---|---|---|---|
| — | DF | NOR | Hans Åge Yndestad (from Skarp) |
| — | DF | NOR | Tobias Vibe (loan from Hødd) |
| — | GK | NOR | Jørgen Vik (from Finnsnes) |

Out: Note: Flags indicate national team as defined under FIFA eligibility rules; some limited exceptions apply. Players may hold more than one non-FIFA nationality.

| No. | Pos. | Nation | Player |
|---|---|---|---|
| — | MF | NOR | Bjørn Strøm (retired) |
| — | MF | NOR | Jonas Johansen (to Tromsø) |
| — | MF | NOR | Fredrik Allertsen (loan to Senja) |
| — | GK | NOR | Lars Konrad Johnsen (to Finnsnes) |
| — | DF | NOR | Tobias Arnøy |

=== Tromsø ===
In: Note: Flags indicate national team as defined under FIFA eligibility rules; some limited exceptions apply. Players may hold more than one non-FIFA nationality.

| No. | Pos. | Nation | Player |
|---|---|---|---|
| — | DF | NOR | Simen Wangberg (from Brann) |
| — | MF | NOR | Jonas Johansen (from Tromsdalen) |
| — | GK | NOR | Lars Herlofsen (from Ørn-Horten) |
| — | MF | NOR | Lars Henrik Andreassen (from Finnsnes) |

Out: Note: Flags indicate national team as defined under FIFA eligibility rules; some limited exceptions apply. Players may hold more than one non-FIFA nationality.

| No. | Pos. | Nation | Player |
|---|---|---|---|
| — | DF | NOR | Ruben Kristiansen (to Vålerenga) |
| — | DF | NOR | Adnan Čaušević (to Bryne) |
| — | FW | NOR | Steffen Nystrøm (to Fredrikstad) |
| — | MF | GER | Hendrik Helmke (to (Finland) Jaro) |
| — | MF | WAL | Josh Pritchard (loan return to (England) Fulham) |
| — | DF | NOR | Jonas Fundingsrud (to Alta) |

=== Ull/Kisa ===
In: Note: Flags indicate national team as defined under FIFA eligibility rules; some limited exceptions apply. Players may hold more than one non-FIFA nationality.

| No. | Pos. | Nation | Player |
|---|---|---|---|
| — | MF | GHA | Enock Kwakwa (from (England) Manchester City) |
| — | DF | ISL | Jóhann Laxdal (from (Iceland) Stjarnan) |
| — | FW | NOR | Chuma Anene (from Vålerenga) |
| — | FW | NOR | Shåresh Ahmadi (from Vålerenga) |
| — | MF | NOR | Markus Furseth (from Lillestrøm) |
| — | MF | NOR | Joakim Holmedal (from Lillestrøm) |
| — | DF | NOR | Lars Ivar Slemdal (loan return from Moss) |
| — | GK | NOR | Henrik Bakke (from Lillehammer) |

Out: Note: Flags indicate national team as defined under FIFA eligibility rules; some limited exceptions apply. Players may hold more than one non-FIFA nationality.

| No. | Pos. | Nation | Player |
|---|---|---|---|
| — | FW | NOR | Ole Kristian Langås (to Sandnes Ulf) |
| — | MF | NOR | Simen Kind Mikalsen (to Lillestrøm) |
| — | FW | CPV | Steevan Dos Santos (to (Angola) Progresso do Sambizanga) |
| — | GK | ISL | Stefán Logi Magnússon (to (Iceland) KR) |
| — | MF | NOR | Christian Aas (to Hønefoss) |
| — | MF | NOR | Ghayas Zahid (loan return to Vålerenga) |
| — | DF | NOR | Martin Rosenkilde (to Moss) |
| — | DF | NOR | Ola Jørstad (to Gjerdrum) |
| — | MF | ENG | Thomas Andrew Morgan (to Gjøvik-Lyn) |
| — | FW | NOR | Kim Brenna |
| — | FW | NOR | Sivert Dæhlie |
