= 2016 Sarpsborg 08 FF season =

Sarpsborg 08
2016 season
- Chairman: Hans Petter Arnesen
- Manager: Geir Bakke
- Stadium: Sarpsborg Stadion
- Tippeligaen: 6th
- Norwegian Cup: Quarter-finals vs Bodø/Glimt
- Top goalscorer: League: Pål Alexander Kirkevold (6); All: Pål Alexander Kirkevold (8)
| Home colours | Away colours | Third colours |

The 2016 season is Sarpsborg 08's 5th season in Tippeligaen, following their return to the top level in 2012. It is also their second season with Geir Bakke as the club's manager.

== Squad ==
Note: Flags indicate national team as defined under FIFA eligibility rules; some limited exceptions apply. Players may hold more than one non-FIFA nationality.

| No. | Pos. | Nation | Player |
|---|---|---|---|
| 1 | GK | NOR | Arild Østbø |
| 2 | FW | NOR | Brice Wembangomo |
| 3 | DF | FIN | Henri Toivomäki |
| 4 | DF | NOR | Kjetil Berge |
| 5 | MF | DEN | Matti Lund Nielsen |
| 6 | MF | NOR | Anders Trondsen |
| 8 | FW | NGR | Kachi |
| 10 | MF | SWE | Jonas Lindberg |
| 11 | MF | NOR | Kristoffer Tokstad |
| 13 | DF | NOR | Ole Hansen (captain) |
| 14 | MF | NOR | Tobias Heintz |
| 15 | DF | NOR | Sigurd Rosted |

| No. | Pos. | Nation | Player |
|---|---|---|---|
| 16 | DF | NOR | Joachim Thomassen |
| 17 | MF | DEN | Steffen Ernemann |
| 18 | MF | NOR | Tor Øyvind Hovda |
| 19 | DF | ISL | Kristinn Jónsson |
| 20 | DF | NOR | Anders Østli |
| 21 | GK | NOR | Anders Kristiansen |
| 22 | MF | NOR | Jon-Helge Tveita |
| 23 | DF | NOR | Jakob Glesnes |
| 24 | FW | NOR | Amani Mbedule |
| 29 | DF | NOR | Alexander Groven |
| 42 | MF | NOR | Magnus Hart |
| 69 | FW | DEN | Patrick Mortensen |

=== Out on loan ===
Note: Flags indicate national team as defined under FIFA eligibility rules; some limited exceptions apply. Players may hold more than one non-FIFA nationality.

| No. | Pos. | Nation | Player |
|---|---|---|---|
| — | MF | NOR | Olav Øby (on loan to Strømmen) |
| — | MF | ALB | Kamer Qaka (on loan to Kristiansund) |

== Transfers ==
=== Winter ===
In: Note: Flags indicate national team as defined under FIFA eligibility rules; some limited exceptions apply. Players may hold more than one non-FIFA nationality.

| No. | Pos. | Nation | Player |
|---|---|---|---|
| 1 | GK | NOR | Arild Østbø (from (Norway) Viking) |
| 2 | DF | NOR | Brice Wembangomo (loan return from (Norway) Kvik Halden) |
| 3 | DF | FIN | Henri Toivomäki (free agent) |
| 5 | MF | DEN | Matti Lund Nielsen (from (Denmark) OB) |
| 10 | MF | SWE | Jonas Lindberg (free agent) |
| 18 | MF | NOR | Tor Øyvind Hovda (from (Sweden) Kalmar) |
| 19 | DF | ISL | Kristinn Jónsson (from (Iceland) Breiðablik) |
| 20 | DF | NOR | Anders Østli (free agent) |
| 21 | GK | NOR | Anders Kristiansen (from (Norway) Bryne) |
| 22 | MF | NOR | Jon-Helge Tveita (from (Norway) Bryne) |
| 23 | DF | NOR | Jakob Glesnes (from (Norway) Åsane) |
| 85 | FW | FRA | Alexy Bosetti (on loan from (France) Nice, previously on loan at (France) Tours) |
| — | FW | NOR | Jørgen Strand Larsen (Promoted) |

Out: Note: Flags indicate national team as defined under FIFA eligibility rules; some limited exceptions apply. Players may hold more than one non-FIFA nationality.

| No. | Pos. | Nation | Player |
|---|---|---|---|
| 1 | GK | DEN | Lasse Heinze (loan return to (Denmark) Midtjylland, later retired) |
| 3 | DF | NOR | Andreas Nordvik (to (Denmark) Esbjerg) |
| 5 | MF | NOR | Olav Øby (on loan to (Norway) Strømmen, previously on loan at (Norway) Follo) |
| 7 | FW | NOR | Martin Wiig (to (Norway) Bodø/Glimt) |
| 10 | MF | NED | Barry Maguire |
| 14 | FW | NOR | Badr Rahhaoui (, previously on loan at (Norway) Kvik Halden) |
| 19 | DF | ALG | Habib Bellaïd |
| 20 | MF | NOR | Simen Brenne |
| 23 | MF | NOR | Tom Erik Breive |
| 25 | MF | NOR | Martin Hoel Andersen (to (Norway) Kvik Halden, previously on loan) |
| 26 | DF | NOR | Martin Thømt Jensen (to (Norway) Fredrikstad) |
| 27 | GK | JAM | Duwayne Kerr |
| 28 | FW | HUN | Péter Kovács (to (Norway) Sandefjord) |
| 31 | GK | NOR | Christian Sukke (to (Norway) Moss, previously on loan at (Norway) Ull/Kisa) |
| 36 | MF | SRB | Bojan Zajić (to (Norway) Sandnes Ulf) |
| 77 | MF | ETH | Amin Askar (loan return to (Norway) Brann) |
| 92 | MF | NOR | Kamer Qaka (on loan to (Norway) Kristiansund) |

=== Summer ===
In: Note: Flags indicate national team as defined under FIFA eligibility rules; some limited exceptions apply. Players may hold more than one non-FIFA nationality.

| No. | Pos. | Nation | Player |
|---|---|---|---|
| 11 | DF | NOR | Morten Sundli (from (Norway) Mjøndalen) |
| 23 | MF | NOR | Kristoffer Normann Hansen (from (Norway) Sandefjord) |

Out: Note: Flags indicate national team as defined under FIFA eligibility rules; some limited exceptions apply. Players may hold more than one non-FIFA nationality.

| No. | Pos. | Nation | Player |
|---|---|---|---|
| 2 | FW | NOR | Brice Wembangomo (on loan to (Norway) Fredrikstad) |
| 4 | DF | NOR | Kjetil Berge (to (Norway) Sandefjord) |
| 11 | MF | NOR | Kristoffer Tokstad (to (Norway) Strømsgodset) |
| 23 | DF | NOR | Jakob Glesnes (to (Norway) Strømsgodset) |
| 85 | FW | FRA | Alexy Bosetti (loan return to (France) Nice) |

== Competitions ==
=== Tippeligaen ===
==== Results summary ====
| Overall | | | | | | | | Home | | | | | | Away | | | | | |
| Pld | W | D | L | GF | GA | GD | Pts | W | D | L | GF | GA | GD | W | D | L | GF | GA | GD |
|---|---|---|---|---|---|---|---|---|---|---|---|---|---|---|---|---|---|---|---|
| 30 | 12 | 9 | 9 | 35 | 37 | −2 | 45 | 7 | 5 | 3 | 18 | 10 | +8 | 5 | 4 | 6 | 17 | 27 | −10 |

Last updated: 9 November 2016.
Source: see below

==== Results by round ====
| Round | 1 | 2 | 3 | 4 | 5 | 6 | 7 | 8 | 9 | 10 | 11 | 12 | 13 | 14 | 15 | 16 | 17 | 18 | 19 | 20 | 21 | 22 | 23 | 24 | 25 | 26 | 27 | 28 | 29 | 30 |
|---|---|---|---|---|---|---|---|---|---|---|---|---|---|---|---|---|---|---|---|---|---|---|---|---|---|---|---|---|---|---|
| Ground | H | A | H | A | H | A | H | A | A | H | A | H | A | H | A | H | A | H | H | A | H | A | H | A | H | A | H | A | H | A |
| Result | L | D | D | L | D | W | W | W | L | W | L | D | W | W | L | W | W | W | L | D | W | D | L | L | W | D | D | W | D | L |
| Position | 13 | 14 | 13 | 15 | 16 | 11 | 9 | 9 | 9 | 9 | 9 | 9 | 8 | 8 | 8 | 8 | 6 | 5 | 6 | 6 | 5 | 6 | 6 | 7 | 5 | 6 | 6 | 5 | 6 | 6 |

Updated to match(es) played on 9 November 2016. Source: see below
A = Away; H = Home; W = Win; D = Draw; L = Loss

==== Results ====
| 13 March 2016 1 | Sarpsborg 08 | 0–1 | Haugesund | Sarpsborg |
| 18:00 CET (UTC+1) | | Summary | Mæland (yellow card) 16'; Karikari 82'; Skjerve (yellow card) 89' | Stadium: Sarpsborg Stadion; Attendance: 3,535; Referee: Martin Lundby |

| 20 March 2016 2 | Viking | 0–0 | Sarpsborg 08 | Stavanger |
| 18:00 CET (UTC+1) | Soares (yellow card) 22' | Summary | Hansen (yellow card) 44'; Hovda (yellow card) 85' | Stadium: Viking Stadion; Attendance: 8,536; Referee: Ola Hobber Nilsen |

| 3 April 2016 3 | Sarpsborg 08 | 0–0 | Sogndal | Sarpsborg |
| 18:00 CEST (UTC+2) | Lund Nielsen (yellow card) 53' | Summary | Bolseth (yellow card) 10' | Stadium: Sarpsborg Stadion; Attendance: 3,308; Referee: Svein-Erik Edvartsen |

| 9 April 2016 4 | Lillestrøm | 4–0 | Sarpsborg 08 | Kjeller |
| 15:30 CEST (UTC+2) | Friday 15', 44'; Mikalsen 23'; Skogseid (yellow card) 54'; Innocent (yellow card) 58'; Rindarøy 90' | Summary | Lund Nielsen (yellow card) 37' | Stadium: Åråsen Stadion; Attendance: 6,073; Referee: Svein Oddvar Moen |

| 17 April 2016 5 | Sarpsborg 08 | 1–1 | Stabæk | Sarpsborg |
| 18:00 CEST (UTC+2) | Groven 44'; Lund Nielsen (yellow card) 62'; Glesnes (yellow card) 82' | Summary | Mehmeti 46', (yellow card) 82' | Stadium: Sarpsborg Stadion; Attendance: 3,926; Referee: Dag Vidar Hafsås |

| 21 April 2016 6 | Start | 1–4 | Sarpsborg 08 | Kristiansand |
| 19:00 CEST (UTC+2) | Heikkilä 11'; Ajer (yellow card) 82' | Summary | Tokstad 3', 23', 75'; Mortensen 33' | Stadium: Sør Arena; Attendance: 3,692; Referee: Trond Ivar Døvle |

| 24 April 2016 7 | Sarpsborg 08 | 4–0 | Molde | Sarpsborg |
| 15:30 CEST (UTC+2) | Kirkevold 1', 54' (pen.); Rosted 27'; Trondsen (yellow card) 37'; Groven (yellow card) 87'; Hovda 89' | Summary | Elyounoussi (yellow card) 38' | Stadium: Sarpsborg Stadion; Attendance: 3,400; Referee: Kim Andre Johansen |

| 2 May 2016 8 | Bodø/Glimt | 0–2 | Sarpsborg 08 | Bodø |
| 19:00 CET (UTC+1) | Babenko (yellow card) 66'; Jacobsen (yellow card) 74' | Summary | Thomassen 7'; Kirkevold (yellow card) 66'; Ernemann 69' (yellow card) 74'; Trondsen (yellow card) 77' | Stadium: Aspmyra Stadion; Attendance: 2,905; Referee: Kai Erik Steen |

| 8 May 2016 9 | Vålerenga | 3–0 | Sarpsborg 08 | Oslo |
| 18:00 CET (UTC+1) | Jääger 21'; Brown 52'; Ómarsson 88' | Summary | | Stadium: Ullevaal Stadion; Attendance: 6,916; Referee: Tore Hansen |

| 12 May 2016 10 | Sarpsborg 08 | 1–0 | Aalesund | Sarpsborg |
| 18:00 CET (UTC+1) | Groven (yellow card) 40'; Trondsen 45+1'; Hansen (yellow card) 49'; Hovda (yellow card) 83' | Summary | Gyasi (yellow card) 72' | Stadium: Sarpsborg Stadion; Attendance: 3,540; Referee: Tom Harald Hagen |

| 16 May 2016 11 | Strømsgodset | 4–0 | Sarpsborg 08 | Drammen |
| 20:00 CET (UTC+1) | Parr 10'; Nana (yellow card) 62'; Valsvik 65'; Storflor 68'; Pedersen 73' | Summary | Thomassen (yellow card) 52'; Hansen (red card) 66' | Stadium: Marienlyst Stadion; Attendance: 7,132; Referee: Martin Lundby |

| 20 May 2016 12 | Sarpsborg 08 | 0–0 | Odd | Sarpsborg |
| 18:00 CET (UTC+1) | Lindberg (penalty missed) | Summary | Eriksen (yellow card) 55' | Stadium: Sarpsborg Stadion; Attendance: 3,450; Referee: Svein-Erik Edvartsen |

| 28 May 2016 13 | Tromsø | 1–2 | Sarpsborg 08 | Tromsø |
| 15:30 CEST (UTC+2) | Kongshavn (yellow card) 26'; Olsen 39'; F.Michalsen (yellow card) 66' | Summary | Ernemann 2' (pen.), 27' (pen.) (yellow card) 59'; Groven (yellow card) 28'; Thomassen (yellow card) 69' | Stadium: Alfheim Stadion; Attendance: 3,340; Referee: Espen Eskås |

| 3 July 2016 14 | Sarpsborg 08 | 1–0 | Brann | Sarpsborg |
| 18:00 CEST (UTC+2) | Kirkevold 60' | Summary | Nilsen (yellow card) 33'; Grønner (yellow card) 35'; Skaanes (yellow card) 76'; Vega (yellow card) 90+1'; Johansen (yellow card) 90+4' | Stadium: Sarpsborg Stadion; Attendance: 4,370; Referee: Kim Andre Johnsen |

| 9 July 2016 15 | Rosenborg | 5–2 | Sarpsborg 08 | Trondheim |
| 18:00 CEST (UTC+2) | Helland 21', 53'; Gytkjær 50' (pen.); Jensen 90+3'; Rashani 90+7' | Summary | Kirkevold 37'; Rosted 48'; Trondsen (yellow card) 60'; J.Glesnes (yellow card) 89' | Stadium: Lerkendal Stadion; Attendance: 15,770; Referee: Tommy Skjerven |

| 17 July 2016 16 | Sarpsborg 08 | 3–0 | Lillestrøm | Sarpsborg |
| 20:00 CEST (UTC+2) | Lindberg 17'; Nielsen 77', 80' | Summary | Mikalsen (yellow card) 6' | Stadium: Sarpsborg Stadion; Attendance: 3,514; Referee: Ola Hobber Nilsen |

| 23 July 2016 17 | Molde | 0–1 | Sarpsborg 08 | Molde |
| 18:00 CEST (UTC+2) | | Summary | Tokstad 33' (yellow card) 42' | Stadium: Aker Stadion; Attendance: 8,832; Referee: Kai Erik Steen |

| 29 July 2016 18 | Sarpsborg 08 | 1–0 | Start | Sarpsborg |
| 19:00 CEST (UTC+2) | Lindberg (yellow card) 69' (goal) 78'; Toivomäki (yellow card) 76'; Hansen (yellow card) 82' | Summary | Salvesen (yellow card) 18'; Johnson (yellow card) 23'; Vikstøl (yellow card) 82' | Stadium: Sarpsborg Stadion; Attendance: 3,757; Referee: Trygve Kjensli |

| 7 August 2016 19 | Sarpsborg 08 | 0–2 | Vålerenga | Sarpsborg |
| 18:00 CEST (UTC+2) | Trondsen (yellow card) 64' | Summary | Lindkvist 22'; Wæhler (yellow card) 39'; Abdellaoue 79' | Stadium: Sarpsborg Stadion; Attendance: 5,107; Referee: Tommy Skjerven |

| 14 August 2016 20 | Odd | 0–0 | Sarpsborg 08 | Skien |
| 18:00 CEST (UTC+2) | Berge (yellow card) 50' (red card) 66'; Samuelsen (yellow card) 90+1' | Summary | Thomassen (yellow card) 33'; Lindberg (yellow card) 69' | Stadium: Skagerak Arena; Attendance: 7,008; Referee: Martin Lundby |

| 21 August 2016 21 | Sarpsborg 08 | 1–0 | Strømsgodset | Sarpsborg |
| 15:30 CEST (UTC+2) | Kirkevold 87' | Summary | Vilsvik (yellow card) 21'; Júnior (yellow card) 22'; Pedersen (red card) 90+1' | Stadium: Sarpsborg Stadion; Attendance: 4,323; Referee: Svein-Erik Edvartsen |

| 26 August 2016 22 | Aalesund | 2–2 | Sarpsborg 08 | Ålesund |
| 19:00 CEST (UTC+2) | Fet 13'; Carlsen (yellow card) 77'; Boli 83' | Summary | Lindberg (yellow card) 9'; Mortensen 11'; Kirkevold 24'; Østli (yellow card) 45+1'; Østbø (yellow card) 78' | Stadium: Color Line Stadion; Attendance: 5,231; Referee: Espen Eskås |

| 11 September 2016 23 | Sarpsborg 08 | 1–2 | Bodø/Glimt | Sarpsborg |
| 18:00 CEST (UTC+2) | T.Heintz 6'; Rosted (yellow card) 79' | Summary | Halvorsen 33' (yellow card) 51'; Manzon 88' (yellow card) 90+3' | Stadium: Sarpsborg Stadion; Attendance: 4,023; Referee: Dag Vidar Hafsås |

| 18 September 2016 24 | Sogndal | 3–0 | Sarpsborg 08 | Sogndalsfjøra |
| 15:30 CEST (UTC+2) | Ramsland 15'; Furebotn (yellow card) 29'; Sveen 74'; Koomson 83' | Summary | | Stadium: Fosshaugane Campus; Attendance: 2,713; Referee: Trygve Kjensli |

| 24 September 2016 25 | Sarpsborg 08 | 1–0 | Viking | Sarpsborg |
| 15:30 CEST (UTC+2) | Kachi 6'; Lindberg (yellow card) 50'; Thomassen (yellow card) 65'; Groven (yellow card) 90+4'; Trondsen (yellow card) 90+5' | Summary | Haukås (yellow card) 87'; Kronberg (yellow card) 90+2' | Stadium: Sarpsborg Stadion; Attendance: 4,027; Referee: Ola Hobber Nilsen |

| 2 October 2016 26 | Haugesund | 1–1 | Sarpsborg 08 | Haugesund |
| 15:30 CEST (UTC+2) | Kiss (yellow card) 33' (goal) 75' (pen.); Troost-Ekong (yellow card) 55'; Abdi (yellow card) 87' | Summary | Ernemann 64'; Kirkevold (yellow card) 67' | Stadium: Haugesund Stadion; Attendance: 4,411; Referee: Espen Eskås |

| 15 October 2016 27 | Sarpsborg 08 | 2–2 | Rosenborg | Sarpsborg |
| 18:00 CEST (UTC+2) | Lindberg 14'; Thomassen (yellow card) 21'; Trondsen (yellow card) 48'; Hovda (yellow card) 50'; Tveita 67' | Summary | Reginiussen 45'; Gytkjær 81' | Stadium: Sarpsborg Stadion; Attendance: 4,523; Referee: Tore Hansen |

| 22 October 2016 28 | Stabæk | 1–2 | Sarpsborg 08 | Bærum |
| 15:30 CEST (UTC+2) | Njie 42'; Keita (yellow card) 56' | Summary | Sundli 84'; Mortensen 88' | Stadium: Nadderud Stadion; Attendance: 3,593; Referee: Tommy Skjerven |

| 30 October 2016 29 | Sarpsborg 08 | 2–2 | Tromsø | Sarpsborg |
| 18:00 CET (UTC+1) | Toivomäki (yellow card) 19'; Mortensen 57'; Rosted 66' | Summary | Gjesdal (yellow card) 25'; Olsen 31', 79'; Ingebrigtsen (yellow card) 42'; Jenssen (yellow card) 54' | Stadium: Sarpsborg Stadion; Attendance: 3,962; Referee: Svein-Erik Edvartsen |

| 6 November 2016 30 | Brann | 2–1 | Sarpsborg 08 | Bergen |
| 18:00 CET (UTC+1) | Orlov 18'; Karadas (yellow card) 41'; Sørensen 43'; Demidov (yellow card) 73'; Haugen (yellow card) 90+3' | Summary | Mortensen 90+2' | Stadium: Brann Stadion; Attendance: 17,686; Referee: Dag Vidar Hafsås |

==== Table ====
| Pos | Team | Pld | W | D | L | GF | GA | GD | Pts | Qualification or relegation |
|---|---|---|---|---|---|---|---|---|---|---|
| 4 | Haugesund | 30 | 12 | 10 | 8 | 47 | 43 | +4 | 46 | Qualification for the Europa League first qualifying round |
| 5 | Molde | 30 | 13 | 6 | 11 | 48 | 42 | +6 | 45 | |
| 6 | Sarpsborg 08 | 30 | 12 | 9 | 9 | 35 | 37 | −2 | 45 | |
| 7 | Strømsgodset | 30 | 12 | 8 | 10 | 44 | 40 | +4 | 44 | |
| 8 | Viking | 30 | 12 | 7 | 11 | 33 | 35 | −2 | 43 | |

Source: Football Association of Norway (in Norwegian), Soccerway
Rules for classification: 1) Points; 2) Goal difference; 3) Goals scored; 4) Head-to-head points; 5) Head-to-head goal difference; 6) Head-to-head away goals scored (between two teams).

=== Norwegian Cup ===
| 13 April 2016 First Round | Ås | 0–5 | Sarpsborg 08 | Ås |
| 18:00 CEST (UTC+2) | P.Yosef (yellow card) 45' | Report | Bosetti 14' (yellow card) 84'; Ernemann 32'; Tokstad 44'; Heintz 48'; Kirkevold 57' | Stadium: Ås stadion Attendance: 334; Referee: Henrik Andreas Pettersen |

| 28 April 2016 Second Round | Kvik Halden | 0–3 | Sarpsborg 08 | Halden |
| 18:00 CEST (UTC+2) | D. Kaili (red card) 16'; M. Engebretsen (yellow card) 23' | Report | Mortensen (penalty missed) , 74'; Kirkevold 42'; Lund Nielsen 86' | Stadium: Halden Stadion; Attendance: 1,203; Referee: Christian Moen |

| 5 May 2016 Third Round | Fredrikstad | 1–3 | Sarpsborg 08 | Fredrikstad |
| 19:00 CEST (UTC+2) | Tønne (yellow card) 19', (goal) 30'; Åsheim (yellow card) 33'; Simonsen (yellow card) 36'; Karoliussen (yellow card) 56' | Report | Toivomäki (yellow card) 26'; Mortensen 44'; Trondsen (red card) 55'; Hansen 61'; Ernemann 74' | Stadium: Fredrikstad Stadion; Attendance: 6,544; Referee: Trygve Kjensli |

| 25 May 2016 Fourth Round | Sarpsborg 08 | 3–0 | Stjørdals-Blink | Sarpsborg |
| 18:00 CEST (UTC+2) | Hovda 12'; Lindberg 73'; Mbedule 79' | Report | | Stadium: Sarpsborg Stadion; Attendance: 2,297; Referee: Trond Ivar Døvle |

| 21 September 2016 Quarter-Finals | Bodø/Glimt | 4–0 | Sarpsborg 08 | Bodø |
| 18:00 CEST (UTC+2) | Manzon 5', 43'; Edvardsen (yellow card) 20'; Berg (yellow card) 53', (goal) 77'; Osvold 90+1' | Summary | Lund Nielsen (yellow card) 53'; Thomassen (yellow card) 80' | Stadium: Aspmyra Stadion; Attendance: 1,456; Referee: Martin Lundby |

== Squad statistics ==
As of match played 6 November 2016

=== Appearances and goals ===
| No. | Pos | Nat | Player | Total | | Tippeligaen | | Norwegian Cup | |
| No. | Pos | Nat | Player | Apps | Goals | Apps | Goals | Apps | Goals |
|---|---|---|---|---|---|---|---|---|---|
| 1 | GK | (Norway) NOR | Arild Østbø | 17 | 0 | 13 | 0 | 4 | 0 |
| 3 | DF | (Finland) FIN | Henri Toivomäki | 16 | 0 | 9+3 | 0 | 4 | 0 |
| 4 | DF | (Norway) NOR | Morten Sundli | 6 | 1 | 1+4 | 1 | 1 | 0 |
| 5 | MF | (Denmark) DEN | Matti Lund Nielsen | 33 | 3 | 23+5 | 2 | 4+1 | 1 |
| 6 | MF | (Norway) NOR | Anders Trondsen | 26 | 1 | 21+2 | 1 | 1+2 | 0 |
| 7 | FW | (Norway) NOR | Pål Alexander Kirkevold | 33 | 8 | 23+6 | 6 | 3+1 | 2 |
| 8 | FW | (Nigeria) NGR | Kachi | 7 | 1 | 2+5 | 1 | 0 | 0 |
| 10 | MF | (Sweden) SWE | Jonas Lindberg | 23 | 4 | 19+2 | 3 | 2 | 1 |
| 13 | DF | (Norway) NOR | Ole Hansen | 18 | 1 | 12+2 | 0 | 4 | 1 |
| 14 | MF | (Norway) NOR | Tobias Heintz | 5 | 2 | 1+2 | 1 | 1+1 | 1 |
| 15 | DF | (Norway) NOR | Sigurd Rosted | 26 | 3 | 21+2 | 3 | 3 | 0 |
| 16 | DF | (Norway) NOR | Joachim Thomassen | 29 | 1 | 28 | 1 | 1 | 0 |
| 17 | MF | (Denmark) DEN | Steffen Ernemann | 30 | 6 | 19+6 | 4 | 5 | 2 |
| 18 | MF | (Norway) NOR | Tor Øyvind Hovda | 18 | 2 | 7+10 | 1 | 1 | 1 |
| 19 | DF | (Iceland) ISL | Kristinn Jónsson | 11 | 0 | 6+3 | 0 | 2 | 0 |
| 20 | DF | (Norway) NOR | Anders Østli | 16 | 0 | 14+1 | 0 | 1 | 0 |
| 21 | GK | (Norway) NOR | Anders Kristiansen | 18 | 0 | 17 | 0 | 1 | 0 |
| 22 | MF | (Norway) NOR | Jon-Helge Tveita | 34 | 1 | 16+13 | 1 | 4+1 | 0 |
| 23 | MF | (Norway) NOR | Kristoffer Normann Hansen | 5 | 0 | 0+4 | 0 | 0+1 | 0 |
| 24 | MF | (Norway) NOR | Amani Mbedule | 8 | 1 | 2+3 | 0 | 0+3 | 1 |
| 29 | DF | (Norway) NOR | Alexander Groven | 26 | 1 | 18+4 | 1 | 3+1 | 0 |
| 42 | MF | (Norway) NOR | Magnus Hart | 4 | 0 | 0+1 | 0 | 0+3 | 0 |
| 69 | FW | (Denmark) DEN | Patrick Mortensen | 29 | 6 | 21+5 | 5 | 3 | 1 |
Players away from Sarpsborg 08 on loan:
Players who left Sarpsborg 08 during the season:
| 4 | DF | (Norway) NOR | Kjetil Berge | 8 | 0 | 8 | 0 | 0 | 0 |
| 11 | MF | (Norway) NOR | Kristoffer Tokstad | 23 | 5 | 19+1 | 4 | 3 | 1 |
| 23 | DF | (Norway) NOR | Jakob Glesnes | 16 | 0 | 13+1 | 0 | 1+1 | 0 |
| 85 | FW | (France) FRA | Alexy Bosetti | 3 | 1 | 0+2 | 0 | 1 | 1 |

=== Goal scorers ===
| Place | Position | Nation | Number | Name | Tippeligaen | Norwegian Cup | Total |
|---|---|---|---|---|---|---|---|
| 1 | FW | (Norway) | 7 | Pål Alexander Kirkevold | 6 | 2 | 8 |
| 2 | FW | (Denmark) | 69 | Patrick Mortensen | 5 | 2 | 7 |
| 3 | MF | (Denmark) | 17 | Steffen Ernemann | 4 | 2 | 6 |
| 4 | MF | (Norway) | 11 | Kristoffer Tokstad | 4 | 1 | 5 |
| 5 | MF | (Sweden) | 10 | Jonas Lindberg | 3 | 1 | 4 |
| 6 | MF | (Denmark) | 5 | Matti Lund Nielsen | 2 | 1 | 3 |
| 7 | DF | (Norway) | 15 | Sigurd Rosted | 3 | 0 | 3 |
| 8 | MF | (Norway) | 18 | Tor Øyvind Hovda | 1 | 1 | 2 |
| 8 | MF | (Norway) | 14 | Tobias Heintz | 1 | 1 | 2 |
| 10 | DF | (Norway) | 29 | Alexander Groven | 1 | 0 | 1 |
| 10 | MF | (Norway) | 16 | Joachim Thomassen | 1 | 0 | 1 |
| 10 | MF | (Norway) | 6 | Anders Trondsen | 1 | 0 | 1 |
| 10 | FW | (Nigeria) | 8 | Kachi | 1 | 0 | 1 |
| 10 | MF | (Norway) | 22 | Jon-Helge Tveita | 1 | 0 | 1 |
| 10 | DF | (Norway) | 4 | Morten Sundli | 1 | 0 | 1 |
| 10 | FW | (France) | 85 | Alexy Bosetti | 0 | 1 | 1 |
| 10 | MF | (Norway) | 24 | Amani Mbedule | 0 | 1 | 1 |
| 10 | DF | (Norway) | 13 | Ole Hansen | 0 | 1 | 1 |
| | | | | TOTALS | 35 | 14 | 49 |

=== Disciplinary record ===
| Number | Nation | Position | Name | Tippeligaen | | Norwegian Cup | | Total | |
| Number | Nation | Position | Name | Yellow card | Red card | Yellow card | Red card | Yellow card | Red card |
| 3 | (Finland) | DF | Henri Toivomäki | 3 | 0 | 1 | 0 | 4 | 0 |
| 5 | (Denmark) | MF | Matti Lund Nielsen | 3 | 0 | 1 | 0 | 4 | 0 |
| 6 | (Norway) | MF | Anders Trondsen | 6 | 0 | 0 | 1 | 6 | 1 |
| 7 | (Norway) | FW | Pål Alexander Kirkevold | 2 | 0 | 0 | 0 | 2 | 0 |
| 10 | (Sweden) | MF | Jonas Lindberg | 4 | 0 | 0 | 0 | 4 | 0 |
| 11 | (Norway) | MF | Kristoffer Tokstad | 1 | 0 | 0 | 0 | 1 | 0 |
| 13 | (Norway) | DF | Ole Hansen | 3 | 1 | 0 | 0 | 3 | 1 |
| 15 | (Norway) | DF | Sigurd Rosted | 1 | 0 | 0 | 0 | 1 | 0 |
| 16 | (Norway) | DF | Joachim Thomassen | 5 | 0 | 1 | 0 | 6 | 0 |
| 17 | (Denmark) | MF | Steffen Ernemann | 2 | 0 | 0 | 0 | 2 | 0 |
| 18 | (Norway) | MF | Tor Øyvind Hovda | 3 | 0 | 0 | 0 | 3 | 0 |
| 20 | (Norway) | DF | Anders Østli | 1 | 0 | 0 | 0 | 1 | 0 |
| 23 | (Norway) | DF | Jakob Glesnes | 2 | 0 | 0 | 0 | 2 | 0 |
| 29 | (Norway) | DF | Alexander Groven | 4 | 0 | 0 | 0 | 4 | 0 |
| 87 | (France) | FW | Alexy Bosetti | 0 | 0 | 1 | 0 | 1 | 0 |
| | | | TOTALS | 40 | 1 | 4 | 1 | 44 | 2 |
