= 2013 Tromsø IL season =

Tromsø
2013 season
- Chairman: Helge Kræmer
- Manager: Agnar Christensen (until 1 October 2013); Steinar Nilsen (from 1 October 2013)
- Stadium: Alfheim Stadion
- Tippeligaen: 15th Relegated
- Norwegian Cup: Fourth Round vs Rosenborg
- Europa League: Group stage
- Top goalscorer: League: Zdeněk Ondrášek (8); All: Zdeněk Ondrášek (12)
- Highest home attendance: 6,033 vs Start; 29 September 2013
- Lowest home attendance: 1,057 vs Follo; 29 May 2013
- Average home league attendance: 3,967; 23 December 2013
Home colours	Away colours

The 2013 season was Tromsø's 11th consecutive year in Tippeligaen, and their 27th season in the top flight of Norwegian football, a run that came to an end as they were relegated to the Adeccoligaen after finishing 15th. They also participated in the 2013 Norwegian Football Cup, reaching the Fourth Round before defeat to Rosenborg. They also played in the 2013–14 UEFA Europa League, reaching the Group Stage before finishing bottom behind Tottenham Hotspur, Anzhi Makhachkala and Sheriff Tiraspol. It was their first season under the management of Agnar Christensen, but he was replaced by Steinar Nilsen on 1 October 2013.

== Transfers ==
=== Winter ===
In: Note: Flags indicate national team as defined under FIFA eligibility rules; some limited exceptions apply. Players may hold more than one non-FIFA nationality.

No.	Pos.	Nation	Player
3	DF	POL	Jarosław Fojut (from Śląsk Wrocław)
5	FW	NOR	Morten Moldskred (from AGF)
6	DF	NOR	Adnan Čaušević (from Vard Haugesund)
18	MF	WAL	Josh Pritchard (from Fulham)
33	MF	NOR	Lars Gunnar Johnsen

Out: Note: Flags indicate national team as defined under FIFA eligibility rules; some limited exceptions apply. Players may hold more than one non-FIFA nationality.

No.	Pos.	Nation	Player
2	MF	SEN	Kara Mbodj (from Genk)
3	DF	SWE	Fredrik Björck (from BK Häcken)
16	MF	NOR	Hans Åge Yndestad (Retired)
25	FW	NOR	Ole Martin Årst (Retired)
35	FW	FIN	Henri Sillanpää (to VPS)

=== Summer ===
In: Note: Flags indicate national team as defined under FIFA eligibility rules; some limited exceptions apply. Players may hold more than one non-FIFA nationality.

No.	Pos.	Nation	Player
25	MF	GHA	Zakari Hamza (loan from Eupen)
28	MF	GER	Hendrik Helmke (from FF Jaro)

Out: Note: Flags indicate national team as defined under FIFA eligibility rules; some limited exceptions apply. Players may hold more than one non-FIFA nationality.

No.	Pos.	Nation	Player
11	MF	NOR	Ruben Yttergård Jenssen (to 1. FC Kaiserslautern)
21	FW	NOR	Vegard Lysvoll (to Tromsdalen)
22	DF	SEN	Saliou Ciss (to Valenciennes)
28	FW	SUI	Aleksandar Prijović (loan return to Sion)

== Competitions ==
=== Tippeligaen ===
==== Results summary ====
Overall								Home						Away					
Pld	W	D	L	GF	GA	GD	Pts	W	D	L	GF	GA	GD	W	D	L	GF	GA	GD
29	7	8	14	40	46	−6	29	7	4	4	28	19	+9	0	4	10	12	27	−15

==== Results by round ====
Round	1	2	3	4	5	6	7	8	9	10	11	12	13	14	15	16	17	18	19	20	21	22	23	24	25	26	27	28	29	30
Ground	A	H	A	H	A	H	A	A	H	A	H	A	H	A	H	H	A	H	A	H	A	H	H	A	H	A	H	A	H	A
Result	D	W	D	L	D	W	D	L	W	L	W	L	W	L	L	D	L	D	L	L	L	D	W	L	L	L	W	L	D	L
Position	10	4	5	8	9	8	7	9	7	7	7	7	7	8	8	9	11	12	13	13	13	13	13	13	14	14	14	14	15	15

Updated to match(es) played on 11 November 2013. Source: see below
A = Away; H = Home; W = Win; D = Draw; L = Loss

==== Results ====
17 March 2013 1	Sogndal	2–2	Tromsø	Sogndalsfjøra
18:00 CET (UTC+1)	Santos 26'; Flo 50'	Summary	Johansen 44'; Bendiksen 60'	Stadium: Fosshaugane Campus; Attendance: 2,718; Referee: Kjetil Sælen

1 April 2013 2	Tromsø	2–1	Odd	Tromsø
15:30 CEST (UTC+2)	Ondrášek 6'; Andersen 15'	Summary	Shala 77' (pen.)	Stadium: Alfheim Stadion; Attendance: 3,325; Referee: Ola Hobber Nilsen

6 April 2013 3	Start	2–2	Tromsø	Kristiansand
15:30 CEST (UTC+2)	Hoff 56' (pen.); Kristjánsson 78'	Summary	Koppinen 72'; Moldskred 74'	Stadium: Sør Arena; Attendance: 5,712; Referee: Svein Erik Edvartsen

14 April 2013 4	Tromsø	0–1	Sandnes Ulf	Tromsø
18:00 CEST (UTC+2)		Summary	Þorsteinsson 55'	Stadium: Alfheim Stadion; Attendance: 3,727; Referee: Kristoffer Helgerud

21 April 2013 5	Aalesund	0–0	Tromsø	Ålesund
15:30 CEST (UTC+2)		Summary		Stadium: Color Line Stadion; Attendance: 10,101; Referee: Tommy Skjerven

28 April 2013 6	Tromsø	2–1	Haugesund	Tromsø
18:00 CEST (UTC+2)	Johansen 20'; Ondrášek 62'	Summary	Kildentoft 79'	Stadium: Alfheim Stadion; Attendance: 4,166; Referee: Trond Ivar Døvle

5 May 2013 7	Hønefoss	1–1	Tromsø	Hønefoss
18:00 CEST (UTC+2)	Vendelbo 62'	Summary	Moldskred 54'	Stadium: Aka Arena; Attendance: 2,668; Referee: Omar Rafiq

8 May 2013 8	Rosenborg	2–1	Tromsø	Trondheim
19:00 CEST (UTC+2)	Strandberg 18'; Elyounoussi 40'	Summary	Ondrášek 55'	Stadium: Lerkendal Stadion; Attendance: 12,151; Referee: Tommy Skjerven

12 May 2013 9	Tromsø	5–0	Sarpsborg 08	Tromsø
18:00 CEST (UTC+2)	Andersen 26'; Johansen 49', 77'; Ondrášek 63'; Nystrøm 90'	Summary		Stadium: Alfheim Stadion; Attendance: 4,266; Referee: Tore Hansen

16 May 2013 10	Vålerenga	2–0	Tromsø	Oslo
18:00 CEST (UTC+2)	Berre 10'; Muri 74'	Summary		Stadium: Ullevaal Stadion; Attendance: 9,338; Referee: Svein Erik Edvartsen

20 May 2013 11	Tromsø	2–0	Brann	Tromsø
19:00 CEST (UTC+2)	Bendiksen 76' (pen.); Nystrøm 90'	Summary		Stadium: Alfheim Stadion; Attendance: 5,171; Referee: Espen Berntsen

26 May 2013 12	Viking	2–1	Tromsø	Stavanger
18:00 CEST (UTC+2)	de Lanlay 25'; Olsen 90'	Summary	Jenssen 77'	Stadium: Viking Stadion; Attendance: 9,473; Referee: Ola Hobber Nilsen

23 June 2013 13	Tromsø	2–0	Lillestrøm	Tromsø
15:30 CEST (UTC+2)	Prijović 79' (yellow card) 79'; Bendiksen 90+1'	Summary		Stadium: Alfheim Stadion; Attendance: 4,018; Referee: Espen Berntsen

29 June 2013 14	Strømsgodset	3–1	Tromsø	Drammen
18:00 CEST (UTC+2)	Vilsvik 31' (pen.); Ibrahim 58'; Adjei-Boateng 84'	Summary	Bendiksen 21'	Stadium: Marienlyst Stadion; Attendance: 5,888; Referee: Svein Edvartsen

7 July 2013 15	Tromsø	2–3	Molde	Tromsø
15:30 CEST (UTC+2)	Andersen 23'; Johansen 27'	Summary	Chima 7', 61'; Moström 69'	Stadium: Alfheim Stadion; Attendance: 4,120; Referee: Kristoffer Helgerud

14 July 2013 16	Tromsø	2–2	Sogndal	Tromsø
18:00 CEST (UTC+2)	Ondrášek 38'; Koppinen (yellow card) 52'; Pritchard (yellow card) 59' (yellow-red card) 63'; Fojut 69'	Summary	Karadas 22'; Stamnestrø 26'; Ruben Holsæter (yellow card) 60'	Stadium: Alfheim Stadion; Attendance: 3,769; Referee: Brage Sandmoen

28 July 2013 17	Odd	3–1	Tromsø	Skien
18:00 CEST (UTC+2)	Berge 10'; Johnsen 28'; Güven 67'	Summary	Bendiksen 81' (pen.)	Stadium: Skagerak Arena; Attendance: 4,619; Referee: Tore Hansen

4 August 2013 18	Tromsø	2–2	Vålerenga	Tromsø
19:00 CEST (UTC+2)	Johansen 57'; Moldskred 79'	Summary	Fellah 15'; Hæstad 33'	Stadium: Alfheim Stadion; Attendance: 4,040; Referee: Kristoffer Helgerud

11 August 2013 19	Sandnes Ulf	2–1	Tromsø	Sandnes
18:00 CEST (UTC+2)	Þorsteinsson 9'; Torsteinbø 89'	Summary	Moldskred 13'	Stadium: Sandnes Idrettspark; Referee: Per Ivar Staberg

18 August 2013 20	Tromsø	1–2	Aalesund	Tromsø
18:00 CEST (UTC+2)	Johansen 77'	Summary	Hamdallah 17'; James 23'; Zaidoun (red card) 80'	Stadium: Alfheim Stadion; Attendance: 4,197; Referee: Trond Ivar Døvle

25 August 2013 21	Haugesund	1–0	Tromsø	Haugesund
18:00 CEST (UTC+2)	Cvetinović 40'	Summary		Stadium: Haugesund Stadion; Attendance: 4,913; Referee: Ola Hobbber Nilsen

1 September 2013 22	Tromsø	1–1	Hønefoss	Tromsø
18:00 CEST (UTC+2)	Drage 72'	Summary	Riski 88'	Stadium: Alfheim Stadion; Attendance: 3,964; Referee: Trygve Kjensli

15 September 2013 23	Tromsø	1–0	Rosenborg	Tromsø
19:00 CEST (UTC+2)	Andersen 24'	Summary		Stadium: Alfheim Stadion; Attendance: 4,945; Referee: Brage Sandmoen

22 September 2013 24	Sarpsborg 08	3–0	Tromsø	Sarpsborg
15:30 CEST (UTC+2)	Kronberg 18'; Elyounoussi 45+4'; Olanare 48'	Summary		Stadium: Sarpsborg Stadion; Attendance: 3,066; Referee: Ken Henry Johnsen

29 September 2013 25	Tromsø	2–3	Start	Tromsø
18:00 CEST (UTC+2)	Ondrášek 67'; Nystrøm 71'	Summary	Hoff 40'; Acosta 48'; Vilhjálmsson 62'	Stadium: Alfheim Stadion; Attendance: 6,033; Referee: Svein Oddvar Moen

6 October 2013 26	Molde	1–0	Tromsø	Molde
18:00 CEST (UTC+2)	Gulbrandsen 4'	Summary		Stadium: Aker Stadion; Attendance: 8,278; Referee: Dag Vidar Hafsås

19 October 2013 27	Tromsø	4–3	Viking	Tromsø
15:30 CEST (UTC+2)	Andersen 11'; Moldskred 19'; Ondrášek 72'; Fojut 82'	Summary	Olsen 48'; Gyan 53'; Berisha 64'	Stadium: Alfheim Stadion; Attendance: 4,551; Referee: Per Ivar Staberg

27 October 2013 28	Lillestrøm	3–2	Tromsø	Lillestrøm
15:30 CET (UTC+1)	Fojut 22' (o.g.); Riise 81', 90+3'	Summary	Andersen 26'; Ondrášek 45+1'	Stadium: Åråsen Stadion; Attendance: 4,548; Referee: Tore Hansen

3 November 2013 29	Tromsø	0–0	Strømsgodset	Tromsø
18:00 CET (UTC+1)	Fojut (yellow card) 58'; Norbye (yellow card) 88'; Kristiansen (yellow card) 90'	Summary	Diomande (yellow card) 64'; Ibrahim (yellow card) 75'	Stadium: Alfheim Stadion; Attendance: 6,392; Referee: Ken Henry Johnsen

10 November 2013 30	Brann	4–1	Tromsø	Bergen
18:00 CET (UTC+1)	Sævarsson 21'; Huseklepp 42' (pen.); Askar 77'; Lorentzen 90+1'	Summary	Bendiksen 24' (pen.)	Stadium: Brann Stadion; Attendance: 11,814; Referee: Tom Harald Hagen

==== Table ====
Pos	Team	Pld	W	D	L	GF	GA	GD	Pts	Qualification or relegation
12	Sogndal	30	8	9	13	33	48	−15	33	
13	Sandnes Ulf	30	9	6	15	36	58	−22	33	
14	Sarpsborg 08 (O)	30	8	7	15	40	58	−18	31	Qualification for the relegation play-offs
15	Tromsø (R)	30	7	8	15	41	50	−9	29	Europa League qualifying and relegation to First Division (Note: Norway was among the best three associations in the UEFA Fair Play ranking and thus received an additional spot in the first qualifying round of the Europa League, Tromsø IL received the qualifying spot for their ranking in Tippeligaen's Fair Play ranking.)
16	Hønefoss (R)	30	6	11	13	34	47	−13	29	Relegation to First Division

Source: fotball.no
Rules for classification: 1) points; 2) goal difference; 3) number of goals scored.
(O) Play-off winners; (R) Relegated

=== Norwegian Cup ===
17 April 2013 First Round	Kirkenes	1–8	Tromsø	Kirkenes
17:00 CEST (UTC+2)	Blix 12'	Summary	Bendiksen 8', 55'; Nystrøm 14', 47'; Drage 18'; Jenssen 27'; Prijović 50', 65'	Stadium: Kirkenes stadion Attendance: 760; Referee: Kim Rune Lydersen

1 May 2013 Second Round	Fløya	2–3	Tromsø	Tromsø
18:00 CEST (UTC+2)	Lekström 26' (o.g.); Hanssen 90'	Report	Prijović 12', 39'; Johnsen 18'	Stadium: Fløyabanen; Attendance: 842; Referee: Ole Martin Loe

29 May 2013 Third Round	Tromsø	3–1	Follo	Tromsø
18:00 CEST (UTC+2)	Fojut 7'; Andersen 67'; Johansen 75'	Summary	Hagen 90+2'	Stadium: Alfheim Stadion; Attendance: 1,057; Referee: Kjetil Thorsø Hansen

19 June 2013 Fourth Round	Rosenborg	2–1	Tromsø	Trondheim
18:00 CEST (UTC+2)	Jensen 23', 61'	Report	Ondrášek 63'	Stadium: Lerkendal Stadion; Attendance: 5,577; Referee: Per Ivar Staberg

=== Europa League ===
==== Qualifying phase ====
4 July 2013 1st qualifying round 1st leg	Tromsø (Norway)	1–2	(Slovenia) Celje	Tromsø, Norway
18:00 BST (UTC+1)	Koppinen 30'; Norbye (yellow card) 65' (red card) 83'	Report	A.Žurej 75'; Gobec 84' (pen.)	Stadium: Alfheim Stadion; Attendance: 1,582; Referee: Felix Zwayer (Germany)

11 July 2013 1st qualifying round 2nd leg	Celje (Slovenia)	0–2 (2–3 agg.)	(Norway) Tromsø	Celje, Slovenia
19:00 CEST (UTC+2)		Summary	Andersen 4'; Moldskred 16'; Ciss (yellow card) 70' (yellow-red card) 81'	Stadium: Arena Petrol; Attendance: 2,800; Referee: Sebastian Colţescu (Romania)

18 July 2013 2nd qualifying round 1st leg	Tromsø (Norway)	2–0	(Azerbaijan) Inter Baku	Tromsø, Norway
19:00 BST (UTC+1)	Ondrášek 43'; Andersen 62'	Report		Stadium: Alfheim Stadion; Attendance: 1,998; Referee: Yuriy Mozharovsky (Ukraine)

25 July 2013 2nd qualifying round 2nd leg	Inter Baku (Azerbaijan)	1–0 (1–2 agg.)	(Norway) Tromsø	Baku, Azerbaijan
18:00 CEST (UTC+2)	Tskhadadze 76'	Summary		Stadium: Bayil Stadium^{1} Referee: Eli Hacmon (Israel)

1 August 2013 3rd qualifying round 1st leg	Tromsø (Norway)	1–0	(Luxembourg) Differdange 03	Tromsø, Norway
19:00 CEST (UTC+2)	Ondrášek 76'	Report		Stadium: Alfheim Stadion; Attendance: 2,135; Referee: Anar Salmanov (Azerbaijan)

8 August 2013 3rd qualifying round 2nd leg	Differdange 03 (Luxembourg)	1–0 (a.e.t.) (1–1 agg.) (3–4 p)	(Norway) Tromsø	Luxembourg, Luxembourg
19:30 CEST (UTC+2)	Er Rafik 46'	Report		Stadium: Stade Josy Barthel; Attendance: 1,960; Referee: Kristo Tohver (Estonia)
	Penalties
	Caron (penalty scored); Jänisch (penalty missed); Franzoni (penalty scored); Luisi (penalty scored); Lebresne (penalty missed)		(penalty missed) Drage; (penalty scored) Ondrášek; (penalty scored) Johansen; (penalty scored) Pritchard; (penalty scored) Nystrøm

22 August 2013 Play-off round 1st leg	Tromsø (Norway)	2–1	(Turkey) Beşiktaş	Tromsø, Norway
20:00 CEST (UTC+2)	Bendiksen 49' (pen.); Pritchard 68'	Report	Almeida 9'	Stadium: Alfheim Stadion; Attendance: 4,528; Referee: Alan Kelly (Ireland)

29 August 2013 Play-off round 2nd leg	Beşiktaş (Turkey)	2–0 (3–2 agg.)	(Norway) Tromsø	Istanbul, Turkey
19:30 CEST (UTC+2)	Hugo Almeida 52'; Özyakup 54'	Report		Stadium: Atatürk Olympic Stadium; Referee: Marcin Borski (Poland)

==== Group stage ====
Pos	Team	Pld	W	D	L	GF	GA	GD	Pts	Qualification
1	(England) Tottenham Hotspur	6	6	0	0	15	2	+13	18	Advance to knockout phase
2	(Russia) Anzhi Makhachkala	6	2	2	2	4	7	−3	8	Advance to knockout phase
3	(Moldova) Sheriff Tiraspol	6	1	3	2	5	6	−1	6	
4	(Norway) Tromsø	6	0	1	5	1	10	−9	1	

Source: Soccerway

19 September 2013 1	Tottenham Hotspur (England)	3–0	(Norway) Tromsø	London, England
21:05 CEST (UTC+2)	Defoe 21', 29'; Eriksen 86'	Summary		Stadium: White Hart Lane; Attendance: 26,581; Referee: Libor Kovařík (Czech Republic)

3 October 2013 2	Tromsø (Norway)	1–1	(Moldova) Sheriff Tiraspol	Tromsø, Norway
19:00 CEST (UTC+2)	Ondrášek 65'	Report	Ricardinho 87'	Stadium: Alfheim Stadion; Attendance: 3,710; Referee: Simon Lee Evans (Wales)

24 October 2013 3	Anzhi Makhachkala (Russia)	1–0	(Norway) Tromsø	Ramenskoye, Russia
18:00 CEST (UTC+2)	Burmistrov 19'	Report		Stadium: Saturn Stadium; Attendance: 2,797; Referee: Gediminas Mažeika (Lithuania)

7 November 2013 4	Tromsø (Norway)	0–1	(Russia) Anzhi Makhachkala	Tromsø, Norway
21:05 CET (UTC+1)		Report	Mkrtchyan 90+4'	Stadium: Alfheim Stadion; Attendance: 3,673; Referee: Danny Makkelie (Netherlands)

28 November 2013 5	Tromsø (Norway)	0–2	(England) Tottenham Hotspur	Tromsø, Norway
19:00 CET (UTC+1)		Report	Čaušević 63' (o.g.); Dembélé 75'	Stadium: Alfheim Stadion; Attendance: 5,868; Referee: Yevhen Aranovskiy (Ukraine)

12 December 2013 6	Sheriff Tiraspol (Moldova)	2–0	(Norway) Tromsø	Tiraspol, Moldova
21:05 CET (UTC+1)	Cadú 4'; Isa 36'	Report		Stadium: Sheriff Stadium; Attendance: 1,211; Referee: Sébastien Delferiere (Belgium)

== Squad statistics ==
As of Match played 12 December 2013

=== Appearances and goals ===
No.	Pos	Nat	Player	Total		Tippeligaen		Norwegian Cup		Europa League	
No.	Pos	Nat	Player	Apps	Goals	Apps	Goals	Apps	Goals	Apps	Goals
1	GK	(Sweden) SWE	Marcus Sahlman	38	0	26+0	0	1+0	0	11+0	0
3	DF	(Poland) POL	Jarosław Fojut	37	3	22+0	2	3+0	1	12+0	0
4	DF	(Norway) NOR	Ruben Kristiansen	42	0	26+1	0	2+0	0	12+1	0
5	FW	(Norway) NOR	Morten Moldskred	44	6	25+5	5	1+1	0	6+6	1
6	DF	(Norway) NOR	Adnan Čaušević	29	0	12+5	0	1+0	0	9+2	0
7	DF	(Finland) FIN	Miika Koppinen	33	2	21+1	1	2+0	0	8+1	1
8	MF	(Norway) NOR	Thomas Kind Bendiksen	44	9	26+1	6	3+0	2	13+1	1
9	FW	(Norway) NOR	Steffen Nystrøm	19	5	2+11	3	1+1	2	2+2	0
10	MF	(Norway) NOR	Thomas Drage	40	2	13+9	1	3+1	1	10+4	0
13	FW	(Czech Republic) CZE	Zdeněk Ondrášek	46	12	27+2	8	2+2	1	11+2	3
14	DF	(Norway) NOR	Hans Norbye	36	0	23+0	0	4+0	0	7+2	0
15	MF	(Norway) NOR	Magnus Andersen	43	9	24+4	6	3+0	1	11+1	2
16	MF	(Norway) NOR	Lars Gunnar Johnsen	19	1	2+7	0	2+1	1	2+5	0
17	MF	(Norway) NOR	Remi Johansen	43	8	25+1	7	3+0	1	11+3	0
18	MF	(Wales) WAL	Josh Pritchard	39	1	18+7	0	3+1	0	8+2	1
19	MF	(Norway) NOR	William Frantzen	4	0	0+0	0	0+0	0	2+2	0
20	DF	(Norway) NOR	Mathias Johnsen	1	0	0+0	0	1+0	0	0+0	0
23	DF	(Norway) NOR	Kent-Are Antonsen	13	0	2+7	0	0+0	0	2+2	0
25	MF	(Ghana) GHA	Hamza Zakari	1	0	0+0	0	0+0	0	1+0	0
27	GK	(Sweden) SWE	Benny Lekström	10	0	4+0	0	3+0	0	3+0	0
28	MF	(Germany) GER	Hendrik Helmke	14	0	2+7	0	0+0	0	4+1	0
30	FW	(Norway) NOR	Runar Espejord	5	0	0+0	0	0+1	0	1+3	0
Players away from Tromsø on loan:
Players who left Tromsø during the season:
11	MF	(Norway) NOR	Ruben Yttergård Jenssen	13	2	12+0	1	1+0	1	0+0	0
21	FW	(Norway) NOR	Vegard Lysvoll	2	0	0+1	0	0+1	0	0+0	0
22	DF	(Senegal) SEN	Saliou Ciss	24	0	14+1	0	3+0	0	6+0	0
28	FW	(Switzerland) SUI	Aleksandar Prijović	18	5	2+11	1	2+1	4	2+0	0

=== Goal scorers ===
Place	Position	Nation	Number	Name	Tippeligaen	Norwegian Cup	Europa League	Total
1	FW	(Czech Republic)	13	Zdeněk Ondrášek	8	1	3	12
2	MF	(Norway)	15	Magnus Andersen	6	1	2	9
2	MF	(Norway)	8	Thomas Kind Bendiksen	6	2	1	9
4	MF	(Norway)	17	Remi Johansen	7	1	0	8
5	FW	(Norway)	5	Morten Moldskred	5	0	1	6
6	FW	(Switzerland)	28	Aleksandar Prijović	1	4	0	5
6	FW	(Norway)	9	Steffen Nystrøm	3	2	0	5
8	DF	(Poland)	3	Jarosław Fojut	2	1	0	3
9	MF	(Norway)	11	Ruben Yttergård Jenssen	1	1	0	2
9	DF	(Finland)	7	Miika Koppinen	1	0	1	2
9	MF	(Norway)	10	Thomas Drage	1	1	0	2
12	MF	(Norway)	16	Lars Gunnar Johnsen	0	1	0	1
12	MF	(Wales)	18	Josh Pritchard	0	0	1	1
				TOTALS	41	14	9	64

=== Disciplinary record ===
Number	Nation	Position	Name	Tippeligaen		Norwegian Cup		Europa League		Total	
Number	Nation	Position	Name	Yellow card	Red card	Yellow card	Red card	Yellow card	Red card	Yellow card	Red card
3	(Poland)	DF	Jarosław Fojut	3	0	1	0	5	0	9	0
4	(Norway)	DF	Ruben Kristiansen	2	0	0	0	0	0	2	0
5	(Norway)	FW	Morten Moldskred	2	0	0	0	0	0	2	0
6	(Norway)	DF	Adnan Čaušević	1	0	0	0	1	0	2	0
7	(Finland)	DF	Miika Koppinen	3	0	0	0	2	0	5	0
8	(Norway)	MF	Thomas Kind Bendiksen	4	0	0	0	0	0	4	0
9	(Norway)	FW	Steffen Nystrøm	0	0	0	0	1	0	1	0
10	(Norway)	MF	Thomas Drage	0	0	0	0	1	0	1	0
11	(Norway)	MF	Ruben Yttergård Jenssen	1	0	0	0	0	0	1	0
13	(Czech Republic)	FW	Zdeněk Ondrášek	3	0	0	0	4	0	6	0
14	(Norway)	DF	Hans Norbye	4	0	0	0	1	1	5	1
15	(Norway)	MF	Magnus Andersen	1	0	0	0	0	0	1	0
16	(Norway)	MF	Lars Gunnar Johnsen	0	0	0	0	2	0	2	0
18	(Wales)	MF	Josh Pritchard	5	1	1	0	1	0	7	1
22	(Senegal)	DF	Saliou Ciss	1	0	1	0	3	1	5	1
23	(Norway)	DF	Kent-Are Antonsen	0	0	0	0	1	0	1	0
28	(Switzerland)	FW	Aleksandar Prijović	3	0	2	0	2	0	7	0
28	(Germany)	MF	Hendrik Helmke	2	0	0	0	2	0	4	0
			TOTALS	35	1	4	0	26	2	65	3

== Notes ==
- Inter Baku played their home match at Bayil Stadium, Baku as their own Shafa Stadium does not meet UEFA criteria.
On 30 August 2013, Beşiktaş was disqualified from the 2013–14 UEFA Europa League as per final ruling by the Court of Arbitration for Sport. They were replaced in the group stage draw by Tromsø, which lost to Beşiktaş in the play-off round.
Anzhi Makhachkala will play their home matches at Saturn Stadium, Ramenskoye instead of their regular stadium, Anzhi-Arena, Makhachkala.
