= Josh Pritchard =

Welsh footballer

Personal information
- Full name: Joshua Philip Pritchard
- Date of birth: 23 September 1992 (age 34)
- Place of birth: Stockport, England
- Height: 5 ft 11 in (1.80 m)
- Position: Midfielder

Youth career
- 1998–2009: Manchester United
- 2009–2012: Fulham

Senior career*
Years	Team	Apps	(Gls)
2012–2014	Fulham	0	(0)
2013	→ Tromsø (loan)	25	(0)
2014	→ FC Honka (loan)	6	(1)
2014–2015	Gillingham	25	(0)
2016–2017	Lysekloster	7	(1)
2017	Assyriska FF	4	(0)

International career
2013–2014	Wales U21	3	(0)
- * Club domestic league appearances and goals

Joshua Philip Pritchard (born 23 September 1992) is a Welsh former footballer.

== Club career ==
=== Fulham ===
Pritchard was signed by Fulham in the summer of 2009 after being released by Manchester United. In July 2012, after three years at the club, Pritchard signed a contract extension until 2014.

Following his return from Tromsø, Pritchard was featured as an un-used substitute in the Fourth round of the FA Cup, in a 1–1 draw against League One side Sheffield United.

=== Tromsø (loan) ===
Pritchard signed for Tromsø in the Tippeligaen on a six-month loan deal in February 2013. He made his debut on 17 March 2013, coming on as a 72nd-minute substitute for Johansen, in Tromsø's opening game of the 2013 Tippeligaen season against Sogndal.

He also made several appearances for the team during the qualifying rounds of the 2013–14 UEFA Europa League. On 22 August 2013, he scored the winning goal as Tromsø beat Beşiktaş 2–1 in the first leg of the Play-off round. As his loan was later extended to run until December 2013, he was able to play in the group stage of the tournament, and his appearance against English club Tottenham Hotspur drew attention from the English media. Following the conclusion of the Tippeligaen, and Tromsø's relegation to the Adeccoligaen, Pritchard stated he wouldn't be moving to Norway permanently and that he would return to Fulham to fight for a first team place. Pritchard returned to Fulham following the conclusion of the Tippeligaen, meaning he missed the remaining two Europa League matches, with Fulham keen to send him back out on loan.

In April 2014, Pritchard joined Veikkausliiga side FC Honka on loan until the end of the season. He then made his debut for the club in a 2–2 draw against HJK

=== Later career ===
After being released by Fulham at the end of the 2013–14 season, Pritchard signed for Gillingham. On 2 September 2015, Pritchard mutually agreed to terminate his contract with Gillingham.

In May 2016, his transfer to Norwegian minnows Lysekloster IL was announced. He made his debut as a 66th-minute substitute against Nest-Sotra on 15 May.

In March 2017, Pritchard signed with Assyriska FF in Sweden. He left the club only months later, in June, by mutual consent after making 4 league appearances.

== International career ==
In August 2012, Pritchard was called up to the Wales Under 21 squad for the 2013 European Under-21 Championship qualifiers against Armenia and Czech Republic. Pritchard made his debut for the Welsh U21 side on 11 October 2013, in a 2–0 home victory over Lithuania.

== Career statistics ==
=== Club ===
As of match played 3 May 2015

Appearances and goals by club, season and competition
Club	Season	League			National Cup		League Cup		Continental		Other		Total	
Club	Season	Division	Apps	Goals	Apps	Goals	Apps	Goals	Apps	Goals	Apps	Goals	Apps	Goals
Fulham	2012–13	Premier League	0	0	0	0	0	0	–		–		0	0
Fulham	2013–14	Premier League	0	0	0	0	0	0	–		–		0	0
Fulham	Total		0	0	0	0	0	0	-	-	-	-	0	0
Tromsø (Loan)	2013	Tippeligaen	25	0	4	0	–		10	1	–		39	1
Honka (loan)	2014	Veikkausliiga	6	1	0	0	–		–		–		6	1
Gillingham	2014–15	League One	25	0	0	0	1	0	–		2	0	28	0
Career total			56	1	4	0	1	0	10	1	2	0	73	2
