= Henri Toivomäki =

Finnish footballer (born 1991)

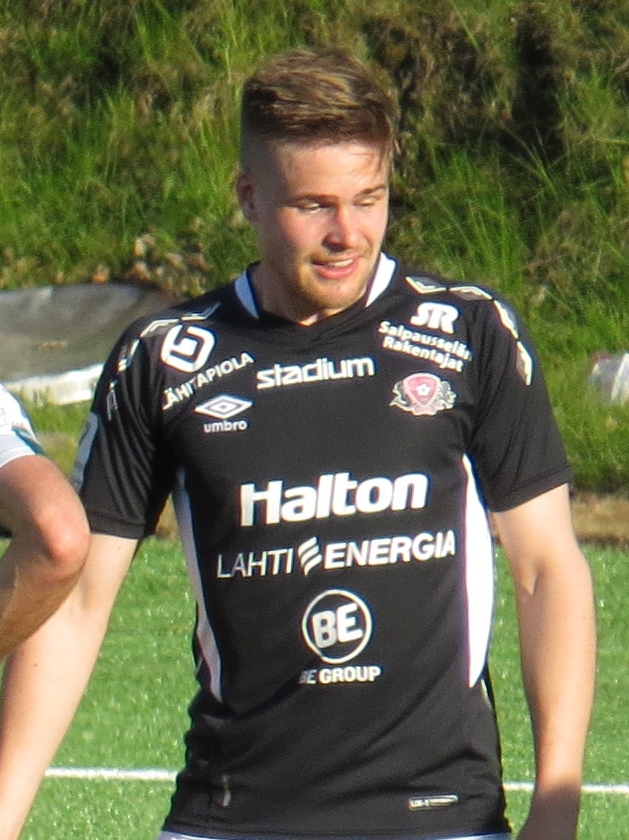
- Toivomäki in 2015

Personal information
- Date of birth: 21 February 1991 (age 35)
- Place of birth: Mäntsälä, Finland
- Height: 1.86 m (6 ft 1 in)
- Position: Right back

Youth career
- MU
- Reipas Lahti

Senior career*
Years	Team	Apps	(Gls)
2008–2011	FC Lahti	48	(0)
2009–2010	→ Atalanta (loan)	0	(0)
2010	→ FC Hämeenlinna (loan)	1	(0)
2011–2013	Ajax	0	(0)
2012–2013	→ Almere CIty (loan)	8	(0)
2013–2015	FC Lahti	63	(1)
2016–2017	Sarpsborg 08	16	(0)
2018	KuPS	30	(0)
2019–2020	HJK	28	(0)
2021–2023	KuPS	49	(2)

International career^{‡}
2009	Finland U19	8	(0)
2010–2011	Finland U21	12	(0)
2018	Finland	1	(0)
- * Club domestic league appearances and goals as of 3 October 2023 ‡ National team caps and goals as of 3 October 2023

Henri Toivomäki (born 21 February 1991) is a Finnish former professional footballer, who last played as a defender for KuPS. He previously played for Sarpsborg 08, FC Lahti, Atalanta, FC Hämeenlinna, AFC Ajax and Almere City FC.

On 3 October 2023, Toivomäki announced that he is forced to end his professional career due to a head injury he suffered in a UEFA Europa Conference League match against Derry City in July 2023.

== Career ==
=== FC Lahti ===
A product of the FC Lahti youth system, Henri Toivomäki made 45 appearances for the Finnish club. On 2 December 2009, he was on trial with the French club Racing Club de Lens. On 31 January 2010 Toivomäki was loaned to Atalanta, playing in Serie A, with an option to buy at the end of the 2009–10 Serie A season. The option was never activated and Toivomäki returned to Lahti, who were struggling against relegation in Veikkausliiga.

=== AFC Ajax ===
On 3 January 2011, Toivomäki signed a 2 1/2-year contract with Dutch club AFC Ajax. Upon his arrival, Toivomäki stated that the influence of FC Lahti teammate Jari Litmanen was decisive in his decision to join the Amsterdam-based side. In the first instance, Toivomäki joined the selection of Jong Ajax. Sidelines for the entire 2011–12 season due to a groin injury, on 27 June 2012 it was announced that Henri would play for Almere CIty on loan from Ajax until July 2013 to find his form after recovery. Making a total of 8 league appearances in the Dutch Eerste Divisie for the side form Almere, and one appearance in the KNVB Cup, not being offered a contract extension following his loan spell however, Toivomäki was released from Ajax, returning to his native Finland.

=== Return to FC Lahti ===
On 23 July 2013 it was announced that Henri Toivomäki had signed with his former club FC Lahti, following the announcement of the club manager Juha Malinen.

=== Sarpsborg 08 ===
On 24 November 2015 he signed with Sarpsborg 08.

=== HJK Helsinki ===
On 31 December 2018, Toivomäki signed with HJK Helsinki.

== International career ==
He has represented Finland at different youth levels, currently he is part of the Finland national under-21 football team. He is considered as one of the most talented junior players in Finland. He was selected to represent Finland U21 against Liechtenstein on 7 September 2010.

Toivomäki was called up to the senior Finland national football team, and made his debut in a 2–0 friendly loss to Romania on 5 June 2018.

== Career statistics ==
As of 2 May 2017

Club performance			League		Cup		Continental		Other		Total	
Season	Club	League	Apps	Goals	Apps	Goals	Apps	Goals	Apps	Goals	Apps	Goals
Finland			League		Finnish Cup		Europe^{1}		Other^{2}		Total	
2008	FC Lahti	Veikkausliiga	15	0	-	-	-	-	-	-	15	0
2009	FC Lahti	Veikkausliiga	24	0	1	0	6	0	4	0	35	0
Italy			League		Coppa Italia		Europe^{1}		Other^{2}		Total	
2009–10	Atalanta (loan)	Serie A	0	0	-	-	-	-	-	-	0	0
Finland			League		Finnish Cup		Europe^{1}		Other^{2}		Total	
2010	FC Hämeenlinna (loan)	Ykkönen	1	0	-	-	-	-	-	-	1	0
2010	FC Lahti	Veikkausliiga	9	0	-	-	-	-	-	-	9	0
Netherlands			League		KNVB Cup		Europe^{1}		Other^{2}		Total	
2010–11	Ajax	Eredivisie	0	0	-	-	-	-	-	-	0	0
2011–12	Ajax	Eredivisie	0	0	-	-	-	-	-	-	0	0
2012–13	Almere City (loan)	Eerste Divisie	8	0	1	0	-	-	-	-	9	0
Finland			League		Finnish Cup		Europe^{1}		Other^{2}		Total	
2013	FC Lahti	Veikkausliiga	11	0	-	-	-	-	-	-	11	0
Norway			League		Norwegian Football Cup		Europe^{1}		Other^{2}		Total	
2016	Sarpsborg 08 FF	Tippeligaen	10	0	4	0	-	-	-	-	14	0
Total	Finland		60	0	1	0	6	0	4	0	71	0
Total	Italy		0	0	-	-	-	-	-	-	0	0
Total	Netherlands		8	0	1	0	-	-	-	-	9	0
Total	Norway		10	0	4	0	-	-	-	-	14	0
Total	Club		78	0	6	0	6	0	4	0	94	0

^{1} Includes UEFA Europa League Qualifier matches.

^{2} Includes Liigacup and Johan Cruijff Shield.

== Honours ==
Individual

- Veikkausliiga Team of the Year: 2022
