= Jonas Lindberg =

Swedish footballer

Personal information
- Full name: Jonas Keijo Antti Lindberg
- Date of birth: 24 March 1989 (age 37)
- Place of birth: Gothenburg, Sweden
- Height: 1.77 m (5 ft 10 in)
- Positions: Forward; left winger

Team information
- Current team: GAIS
- Number: 25

Youth career
- Falköpings FK

Senior career*
Years	Team	Apps	(Gls)
2008–2010	Skövde AIK	60	(15)
2010–2012	GAIS	26	(1)
2012	→ Varbergs BoIS (loan)	27	(2)
2013–2015	Ljungskile	85	(20)
2016–2017	Sarpsborg 08	45	(4)
2018	GAIS	15	(1)
2018–2020	IK Sirius	30	(2)
2021–	GAIS	124	(7)
- * Club domestic league appearances and goals as of 8 July 2026

Jonas Lindberg (born 24 March 1989) is a Swedish footballer who plays as a forward for GAIS.

== Club career ==
On 4 November 2015 he signed a deal with Sarpsborg 08 for 2 years.
