= Jan Banan Tømmernes =

Norwegian footballer (born 1987)

Jan Tømmernes
Personal information
- Full name: Jan Banan Halbrendt Tømmernes
- Date of birth: 26 January 1987 (age 39)
- Place of birth: Asker, Norway
- Height: 1.82 m (6 ft 0 in)
- Position: Striker

Team information
- Current team: Heggedal

Senior career*
Years	Team	Apps	(Gls)
2003–2007	Asker	72	(60)
2008–2010	Stabæk	25	(3)
2009	→ Asker (loan)	14	(6)
2011	Asker	24	(2)
2012–2013	Kristiansund	38	(17)
2014–2015	Bærum	10	(0)
2015	Holmen		
2016–	Heggedal		
- * Club domestic league appearances and goals as of 22 November 2013

Jan Banan Halbrent Tømmernes (born 26 January 1987) is a Norwegian football striker currently playing for Heggedal.

Tømmernes joined Stabæk from Asker ahead of the 2008 season. In 2007 he became joint top goalscorer in the Norwegian Second Division with 26 goals. He played only four Norwegian Premier League games for Stabæk in 2008, but the team won the league. In 2009, he was sent on loan to Asker.

When joining Holmen in 2015 he became the first player to feature for four clubs in Asker and Bærum in the three highest tiers. In 2016, he went on to minnows Heggedal.

== Career statistics ==
As of 15 November 2014

Season	Club	Division	League		Cup		Total	
Season	Club	Division	Apps	Goals	Apps	Goals	Apps	Goals
2008	Stabæk	Tippeligaen	4	0	2	1	6	1
2009	Asker	2. divisjon	14	6	4	0	31	1
2010	Stabæk	Tippeligaen	21	3	2	2	23	5
2011	Asker	Adeccoligaen	24	2	3	3	27	5
2012	Kristiansund	2. divisjon	14	11	1	1	15	12
2013	Kristiansund	Adeccoligaen	24	6	0	0	24	6
2014	Bærum	1. divisjon	10	0	1	0	11	0
2015	Bærum	OBOS-ligaen	0	0	0	0	0	0
Career Total			111	28	13	7	124	35
