= Henrik Nordnes =

Norwegian footballer (born 1980)

Henrik Nordnes (born 28 August 1980) is a retired Norwegian football defender.

He hails from Frogner i Sørum and started his senior career in Ullensaker/Kisa IL. Following spells in Skjetten SK and Follo FK he was signed by first-tier club Tromsø IL in 2007, appearing in six games in the 2007 Tippeligaen. He was injury-stricken, and loaned out to Ullensaker/Kisa before joining Strømmen IF. He retired after the 2013 season.
