= Adnan Čaušević =

Norwegian footballer (born 1990)

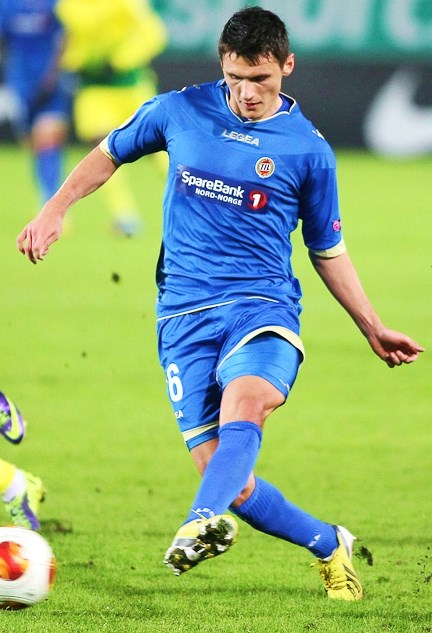

Personal information
- Date of birth: 10 January 1990 (age 36)
- Place of birth: Prijedor, Bosnia and Herzegovina
- Height: 1.87 m (6 ft 2 in)
- Position: Defender

Team information
- Current team: Finnsnes
- Number: 19

Youth career
- Djerv 1919
- Vard Haugesund

Senior career*
Years	Team	Apps	(Gls)
2007–2012	Vard Haugesund	173	(32)
2013–2014	Tromsø	18	(0)
2014–2015	Bryne	21	(0)
2015	Vard Haugesund	3	(0)
2016–	Finnsnes	11	(1)
- * Club domestic league appearances and goals as of 24 December 2016

Adnan Čaušević (born 10 January 1990) is a Norwegian footballer who plays as a defender for Finnsnes IL. Bosnian-born Adnan was granted Norway citizenship.

Čaušević was born in Prijedor. He played for Vard Haugesund before he joined Tromsø IL ahead of the 2013 season. After a decent stint there, he moved back south to play for Bryne.

In the summer of 2015 he went back to Vard, only to move to the city of Tromsø again in 2016. He signed for the nearby team Finnsnes.

== Career statistics ==
As of 10 July 2015

Season	Club	Division	League		Cup		Europe		Total	
Season	Club	Division	Apps	Goals	Apps	Goals	Apps	Goals	Apps	Goals
2013	Tromsø	Tippeligaen	18	0	2	0	11	0	31	0
2014	Bryne	1. divisjon	16	0	1	0	0	0	17	0
2015	Bryne	OBOS-ligaen	5	0	2	2	-	-	7	2
2015	Vard Haugesund	2. divisjon	3	0	0	0	0	0	3	0
2016	Finnsnes	2. divisjon	11	1	0	0	0	0	11	1
Career total			53	1	5	2	11	0	69	3
