= Jon-Helge Tveita =

Norwegian footballer (born 1992)

Personal information
- Full name: Jon-Helge Ødegård Tveita
- Date of birth: 22 October 1992 (age 34)
- Place of birth: Stavanger, Norway
- Height: 1.84 m (6 ft 1/2 in)
- Position: Right-back

Youth career
- –2008: Forus og Gausel

Senior career*
Years	Team	Apps	(Gls)
2009–2010	Stavanger IF		
2011–2013	Viking	16	(1)
2013	→ Bryne (loan)	30	(4)
2013–2015	Bryne	60	(13)
2016–2019	Sarpsborg 08	80	(2)
2020–2021	Brann	27	(3)
2021–2023	Start	22	(2)
2024–2025	Bryne	43	(1)

International career
2013	Norway U21	2	(0)
- * Club domestic league appearances and goals as of 1 January 2026

Jon-Helge Ødegård Tveita (born 22 October 1992) is a Norwegian footballer who plays as a right-back. He played for Forus og Gausel, Stavanger IF, Viking, Bryne, Sarpsborg 08 and Brann. He made his Eliteserien debut for Viking in a 1–1 draw against Start on 20 November 2011. He was loaned out to Bryne in 2013. On 30 July 2021, he signed for IK Start.

== Career statistics ==
As of match played 11 May 2025

Club	Season	Division	League		Cup		Europe		Total	
Club	Season	Division	Apps	Goals	Apps	Goals	Apps	Goals	Apps	Goals
Viking	2011	Eliteserien	2	1	0	0	—		2	1
Viking	2012	Eliteserien	14	0	3	0	—		17	0
Viking	Total		16	1	3	0	—		19	1
Bryne	2013	1. divisjon	30	4	4	1	—		34	5
Bryne	2014	1. divisjon	30	8	2	0	—		32	8
Bryne	2015	1. divisjon	30	5	2	1	—		32	6
Bryne	Total		90	17	8	2	—		98	19
Sarpsborg 08	2016	Eliteserien	29	1	5	0	—		34	1
Sarpsborg 08	2017	Eliteserien	17	0	2	0	—		19	0
Sarpsborg 08	2018	Eliteserien	25	1	1	0	12	0	38	1
Sarpsborg 08	2019	Eliteserien	9	0	0	0	—		9	0
Sarpsborg 08	Total		80	2	8	0	12	0	100	2
Brann	2020	Eliteserien	20	2	—		—		20	2
Brann	2021	Eliteserien	7	1	1	0	—		8	1
Brann	Total		27	3	1	0	—		28	3
Start	2021	1. divisjon	15	2	0	0	—		15	2
Start	2022	1. divisjon	4	0	3	0	—		7	0
Start	2023	1. divisjon	2	0	0	0	—		2	0
Start	Total		21	2	3	0	—		24	2
Bryne	2024	1. divisjon	26	1	3	1	—		29	2
Bryne	2025	Eliteserien	4	0	2	0	—		6	0
Bryne	Total		30	1	5	1	—		35	2
Career total			264	26	28	3	12	0	304	29
