= Tor Øyvind Hovda =

Norwegian footballer (born 1989)

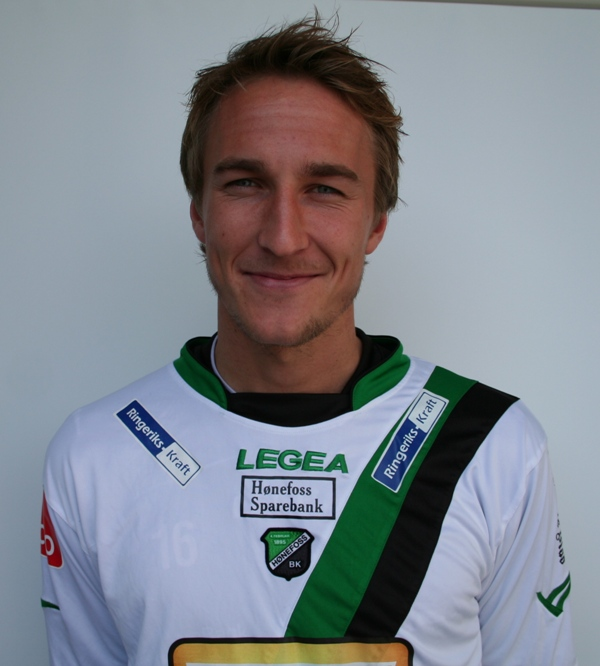

Personal information
- Full name: Tor Øyvind Stensæter Hovda
- Date of birth: 24 September 1989 (age 37)
- Place of birth: Ringerike, Norway
- Height: 1.87 m (6 ft 1 1/2 in)
- Position: Midfielder

Team information
- Current team: Hønefoss
- Number: 7

Senior career*
Years	Team	Apps	(Gls)
2007–2013	Hønefoss	127	(5)
2014–2015	Kalmar	25	(1)
2015	→ Åtvidabergs FF (loan)	20	(2)
2016–2017	Sarpsborg 08	26	(1)
2018–	Hønefoss	50	(3)
- * Club domestic league appearances and goals as of 28 July 2020

Tor Øyvind Hovda (born 24 September 1989) is a Norwegian footballer who plays for Hønefoss as a midfielder.

== Club career ==
Hovda played youth football for both Heradsbygda IL and later Hønefoss BK, where he made his first senior appearance in 2007. Allsvenskan club Kalmar FF signed Hovda for the 2014 season, and he scored the first goal on 27 October against Mjällby AIF. He plays most of the games in the central midfield.

In 2016 he joined Sarpsborg 08.

== Honours ==
Hønefoss BK

- 1. Division: 2011
