= Remi Johansen =

Norwegian footballer (born 1990)

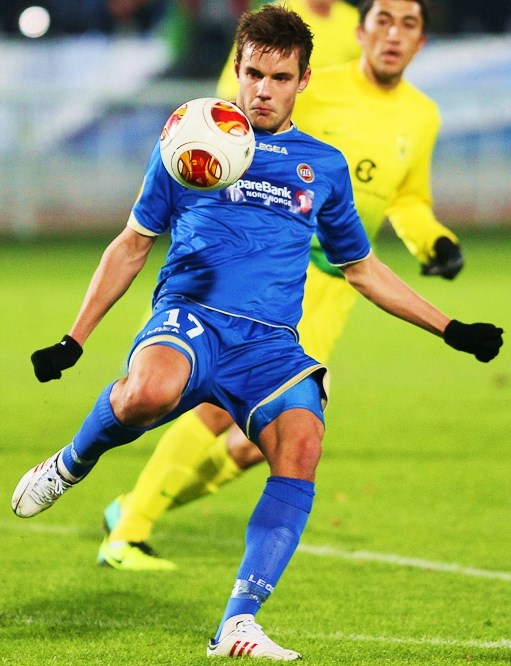
- Johansen in 2013

Personal information
- Date of birth: 4 September 1990 (age 36)
- Place of birth: Tromsø, Norway
- Height: 1.83 m (6 ft 0 in)
- Position: Midfielder

Team information
- Current team: Valhall
- Number: 17

Youth career
- Ringvassøy IL
- Tromsø

Senior career*
Years	Team	Apps	(Gls)
2009–2015	Tromsø	168	(30)
2016–2017	Brann	10	(1)
2017–2018	Sandnes Ulf	36	(0)
2019	Sola	22	(3)
2020	Vidar	0	(0)
2021–	Valhall		

International career
2008	Norway U18	3	(0)
2009	Norway U19	1	(0)
2010–2011	Norway U21	4	(0)
2012	Norway U23	1	(0)
- * Club domestic league appearances and goals as of 20:18, 27 October 2022 (UTC)

Remi Johansen (born 4 September 1990) is a Norwegian footballer who plays for Valhall FK in the 4. divisjon. He made his debut in the Norwegian Premier League 23 March 2009 for Tromsø against Rosenborg.

== Career ==
=== Sandnes Ulf ===
Johansen left Sandnes Ulf at the end of 2018.

== Career statistics ==
As of 18 September 2019

Season	Club	Division	League		Cup		Europe		Total	
Season	Club	Division	Apps	Goals	Apps	Goals	Apps	Goals	Apps	Goals
2009	Tromsø	Tippeligaen	8	1	0	0	0	0	8	1
2010	Tromsø	Tippeligaen	29	4	3	0	0	0	32	4
2011	Tromsø	Tippeligaen	29	2	3	1	4	1	36	4
2012	Tromsø	Tippeligaen	24	3	7	1	4	0	35	4
2013	Tromsø	Tippeligaen	27	7	3	1	14	0	44	8
2014	Tromsø	1. divisjon	25	10	2	0	4	0	31	10
2015	Tromsø	Tippeligaen	26	3	0	0	-	-	26	3
2016	Brann	Tippeligaen	10	1	1	0	-	-	11	1
2017	Sandnes Ulf	OBOS-ligaen	17	0	1	0	-	-	18	0
2018	Sandnes Ulf	OBOS-ligaen	18	0	2	0	-	-	20	0
2019	Sola	PostNord-ligaen	17	2	1	0	-	-	18	2
Career Total			230	33	23	3	26	1	279	37
