= 2009 Superfinalen =

Norwegian football match

Stabæk	Vålerenga
3	1
- Date: 8 March 2009
- Venue: Telenor Arena, Bærum
- Referee: Terje Hauge (Olsvik)
- Attendance: 6,362

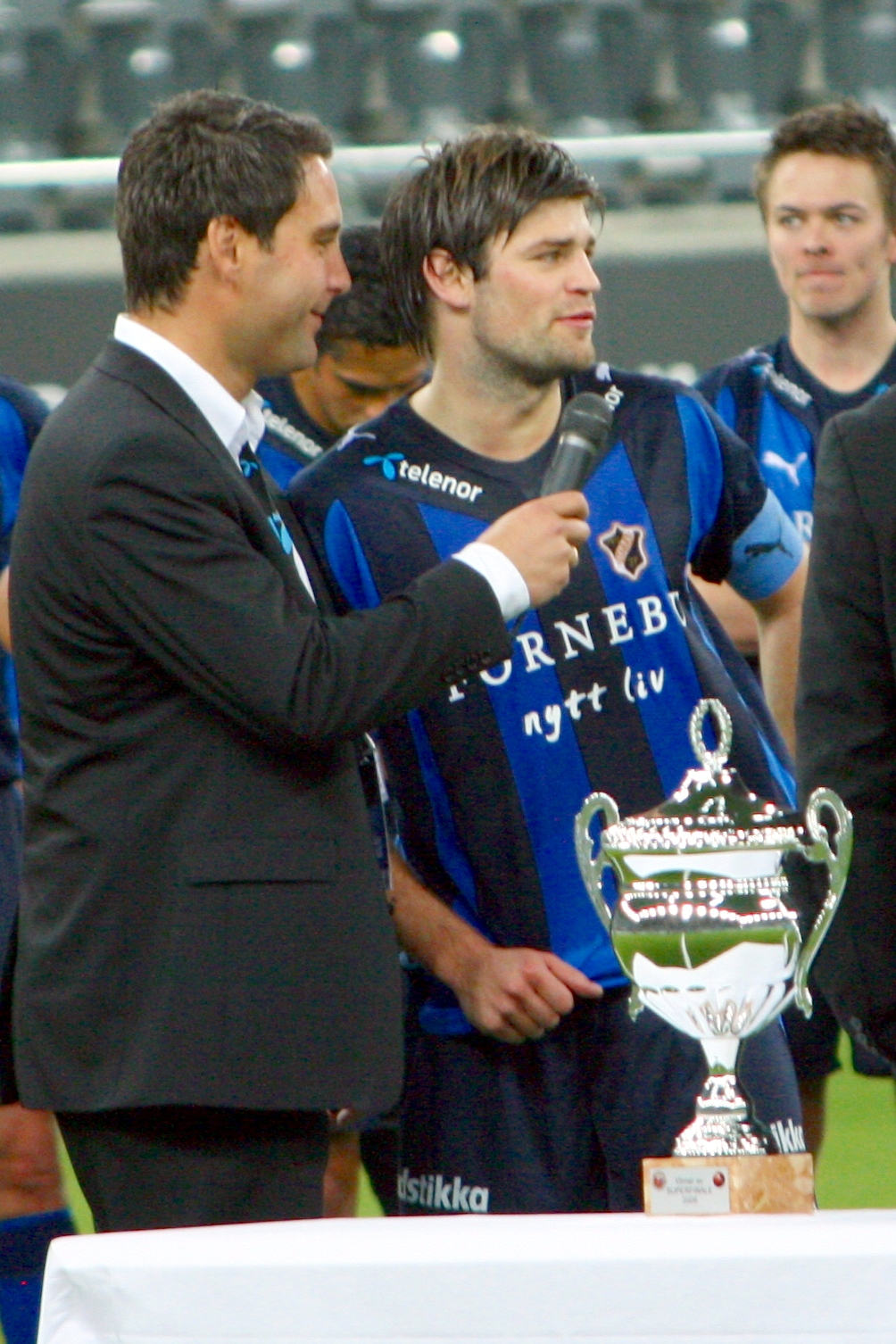
Stabæk captain Morten Skjønsberg receiving the trophy.

The 2009 Superfinalen was the first edition of Superfinalen, an annual football match contested by the winners of the previous season's Tippeligaen and Norwegian Cup competitions. It was played on 8 March 2009, at Telenor Arena in Bærum, between Stabæk and Vålerenga, winners of the 2008 Tippeligaen and 2008 Norwegian Football Cup respectively. A collaboration between the Football Association of Norway, Norsk Toppfotball, the incumbent league and cup champions, and the broadcaster TV 2, the match was seen as a test of the viability of a Super Cup in Norway. Modeled on the FA Community Shield, the Superfinalen is intended to be a season opener, with the net proceeds of each match going to charity. In 2009, these proceeds were donated to UNICEF.

The game was a repeat of the 2008 Norwegian Football Cup Final, in which Vålerenga had defeated Stabæk 4–1. This time, however, it was Stabæk who won the match 3–1 after goals by Daniel Nannskog, Daigo Kobayashi and Pálmi Rafn Pálmason. Mohammed Abdellaoue scored for the losing side.

The game also served as the official opening match of Telenor Arena, which became Stabæk's home ground from 2009 to 2011.

== Match details ==
8 March 2009
19:00 CET

Stabæk	3–1	Vålerenga
Nannskog 19'; Kobayashi 38'; Pálmason 56'	Report	Abdellaoue 48'

Telenor Arena, Bærum
Attendance: 6,362
Referee: Terje Hauge (Olsvik)

Stabæk	Vålerenga

STABÆK:
GK	1	(Norway) Jon Knudsen
RB	9	(Denmark) Christian Keller	(substituted off) 65'
CB	2	(Sweden) Lars Fredrik Risp	(substituted off) 58'
CB	15	(Norway) Morten Skjønsberg (c)
LB	3	(Norway) Jon Inge Høiland
RM	10	(Japan) Daigo Kobayashi
CM	17	(Sweden) Pontus Farnerud
CM	7	(Norway) Henning Hauger	(substituted off) 71'
LM	13	(Iceland) Pálmi Rafn Pálmason
CF	11	(Sweden) Daniel Nannskog
CF	8	(Norway) Espen Hoff
Substitutes:
GK	22	(Norway) Iven Austbø
DF	18	(Norway) Thomas Rogne	(substituted in) 65'
DF	20	(Norway) Inge André Olsen	(substituted in) 58'
MF	21	(United States) Mix Diskerud	(substituted in) 71'
MF	23	(Norway) Vegar Eggen Hedenstad
FW	27	(Norway) Torstein Andersen Aase
Manager:
(Sweden) Jan Jönsson

VÅLERENGA:
GK	1	(United States) Troy Perkins
RB	13	(Norway) Jarl André Storbæk
CB	18	(Venezuela) Juan Fuenmayor
CB	4	(Norway) André Muri (c)
LB	3	(Denmark) Allan Jepsen
DM	23	(Norway) Kristofer Hæstad
DM	8	(Norway) Martin Andresen	(yellow card) 22' (yellow-red card) 43'
RM	19	(Norway) Dawda Leigh		(substituted off) 46'
AM	10	(Norway) Lars Iver Strand	(yellow card) 23'	(substituted off) 65'
LM	11	(Norway) Morten Berre
CF	25	(Norway) Mohammed Abdellaoue		(substituted off) 71'
Substitutes:
GK	30	(Norway) Øyvind Bolthof
MF	6	(Norway) Freddy dos Santos		(substituted in) 65'
MF	24	(Norway) Stefan Strandberg
MF	26	(Serbia) Bojan Zajić
MF	28	(Norway) Harmeet Singh		(substituted in) 46'
MF	31	(Norway) Kristian Brix
FW	20	(Norway) Mostafa Abdellaoue		(substituted in) 71'
Manager:
(Norway) Martin Andresen

MATCH RULES

- 90 minutes.
- Penalty shoot-out if scores level after 90 minutes.
- Seven named substitutes
- Maximum of three substitutions.

== See also ==
- 2008 Tippeligaen
- 2008 Norwegian Football Cup
