= 2008 Norwegian Football Cup final =

- Event: 2008 Norwegian Football Cup
Stabæk	Vålerenga
1	4
- Date: 9 November 2008
- Venue: Ullevaal Stadion, Oslo
- Referee: Svein Oddvar Moen
- Attendance: 24,823

The 2008 Norwegian Football Cup final was the final match of the 2008 Norwegian Football Cup, the 103rd season of the Norwegian Football Cup, the premier Norwegian football cup competition organized by the Football Association of Norway (NFF). The match was played on 9 November 2008 at the Ullevaal Stadion in Oslo, and opposed two Tippeligaen sides Stabæk and Vålerenga. Vålerenga defeated Stabæk 4–1 to claim the Norwegian Cup for a fourth time in their history.

== Route to the final ==
Stabæk		Round	Vålerenga	
Vestfossen (D3); A 14–0	Segerström 2', 63', Alanzinho 12', Andersson 24', 43', 59', Gunnarsson 47', Kjølø 64', Høiland 68', 69', 82', Tømmernes 79', Nannskog 88', 90+2'	First round	Ørn-Horten (D3); A 5–0	Zajić 61', 87', Sæternes 65', 73', Abdellaoue 85'
Fram Larvik (D3); A 2–0	Alanzinho 57', 81'	Second round	Raufoss (D2); A 4–1	Thorvaldsson 2', 89', Sæternes 18', Zajić 87'
Manglerud Star (D2); H 5–0	Andersson 36', Gunnarsson 53', 57' (pen.), 81', Nannskog 67'	Third round	Sarpsborg Sparta (D1); A 3–2	Sæternes 14', Abdellaoue 64', dos Santos 82'
Sogndal (D1); A 3–1	Gunnarsson 42', Stenvoll 75', 89'	Fourth round	Tromsø (TL); A 2–0 aet	Zajić 97', Abdellaoue 118'
Strømsgodset (TL); H 5–0	Farnerud 63', Nannskog 68', Gunnarsson 81', 88'	Quarter-final	Bodø/Glimt (TL); H 3–1	Shelton 16', Fredheim Holm 45', Moa 66'
Molde (TL); H 3–0	Nannskog 30', 90+2', Farnerud 76'	Semi-final	Odd Grenland (D1); H 2–1	Abdellaoue 31', Sæternes 38'

- (TL) = Tippeligaen team
- (D1) = 1. divisjon team
- (D2) = 2. divisjon team
- (D3) = 3. divisjon team

== Match ==
=== Details ===
9 November 2008
13:15 CET (UTC+1)

Stabæk	1–4	Vålerenga
Andersson 69'	Report	Abdellaoue 31', 54'; Fredheim Holm 50', 70'

Ullevaal Stadion, Oslo
Attendance: 24,823
Referee: Svein Oddvar Moen (Haugar)

Stabæk	Vålerenga

Stabæk:
GK	1	(Norway) Jon Knudsen
DF	9	(Denmark) Christian Keller	(substituted off) 74'
DF	2	(Sweden) Niklas Sandberg
DF	15	(Norway) Morten Skjønsberg (c)
DF	3	(Norway) Jon Inge Høiland	(substituted off) 88'
MF	19	(Sweden) Johan Andersson
MF	17	(Sweden) Pontus Farnerud
MF	7	(Norway) Henning Hauger
FW	25	(Brazil) Alanzinho
FW	10	(Iceland) Veigar Pall Gunnarsson	(substituted off) 84'
FW	11	(Sweden) Daniel Nannskog
Substitutions:
DF	26	(Norway) Bjørnar Holmvik	(substituted on) 74'
MF	13	(Iceland) Pálmi Rafn Pálmason	(substituted on) 84'
DF	6	(Norway) Tom Stenvoll	(substituted on) 88'
Coach:
(Sweden) Jan Jönsson

Vålerenga:
GK	1	(United States) Troy Perkins		(substituted off) 89'
DF	6	(Norway) Freddy dos Santos
DF	24	(Norway) Kjetil Wæhler	(yellow card) 63'	(substituted off) 83'
DF	4	(Norway) André Muri
DF	3	(Denmark) Allan Jepsen
MF	10	(Norway) Lars Iver Strand
MF	23	(Norway) Kristofer Hæstad
MF	8	(Norway) Martin Andresen	(yellow card) 77'
MF	11	(Norway) Morten Berre	(yellow card) 52'	(substituted off) 86'
FW	7	(Norway) Daniel Fredheim Holm (c)
FW	25	(Norway) Mohammed Abdellaoue
Substitutions:
DF	5	(Norway) Erik Hagen		(substituted on) 83'
MF	28	(Norway) Harmeet Singh		(substituted on) 86'
GK	30	(Norway) Øyvind Bolthof		(substituted on) 89'
Coach:
(Norway) Martin Andresen
