= Mesterfinalen =

- Organising body: Norges Fotballforbund
- Founded: 2009; 2009–2010 (as Superfinalen); 2017–2018 (as Mesterfinalen)
- First season: 2009
- Folded: 2019
- Country: Norway
- Number of clubs: 2
- Last champions: Rosenborg (3rd title)
- Most championships: Rosenborg (3 titles)
- Broadcaster(s): Discovery Networks Norway

Mesterfinalen (English: Champions Final), also known as UNICEF Mesterfinalen due to its cooperation with UNICEF, is a Norwegian association football competition contested between the champions of the previous Eliteserien season and the holders of the Norwegian Football Cup. If the same team is both reigning League and Cup champions, the silver medalist from the league provides the opposition. The competition was founded in 2009, then known as Superfinalen (English: Super Final). Superfinalen was not arranged between 2011 and 2016 before it was rebranded and again arranged in 2017. The fixture is a recognised competitive football super cup.

== History ==
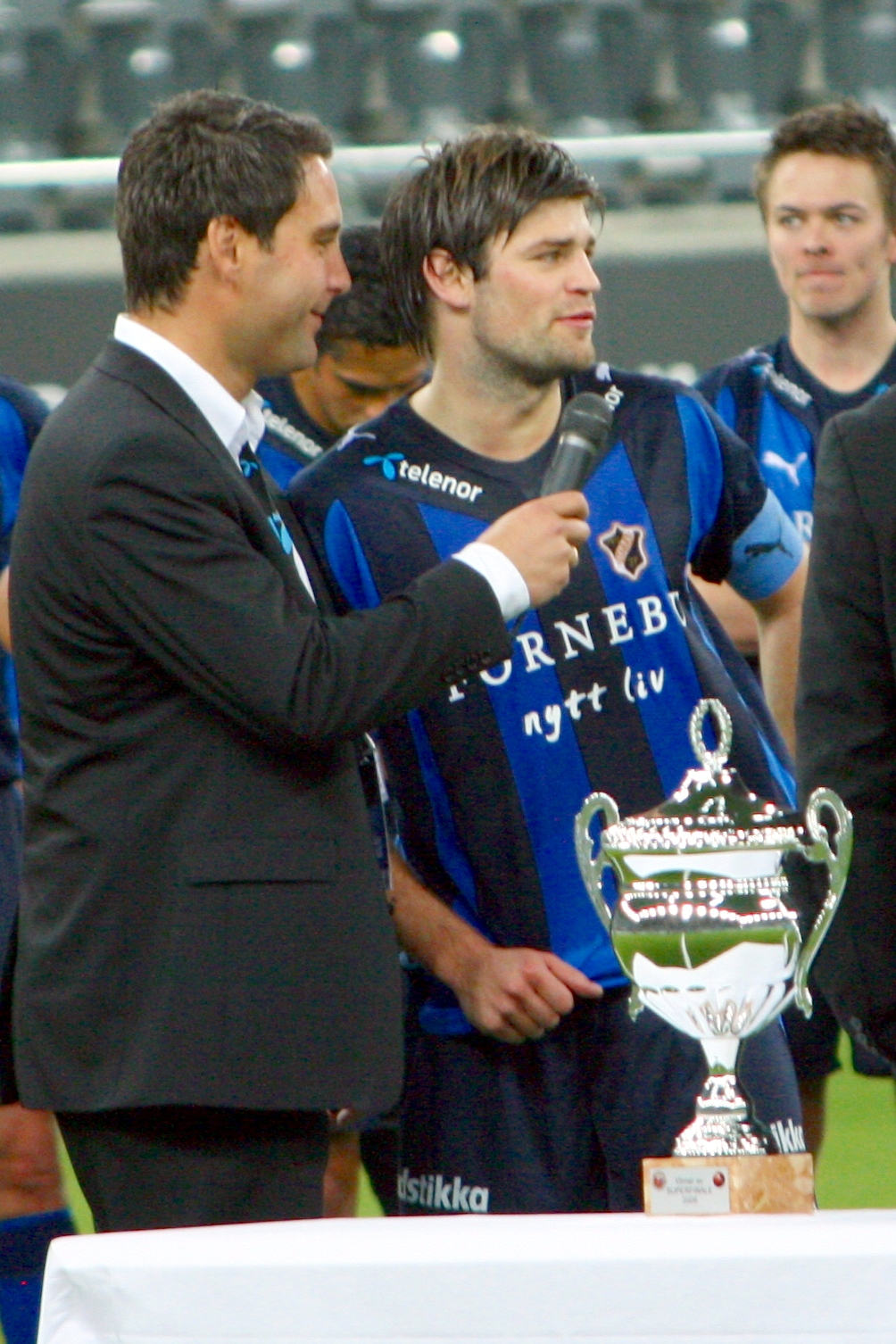
Stabæk captain Morten Skjønsberg receiving the Superfinalen trophy after the 2009 victory.

There have previously been attempts at a Supercup, and before that, pre-season friendlies between the reigning league and cup champions. For instance, the 2002 pre-season match between Rosenborg and Viking was played between the reigning league and cup champions, although it had no official status. The Superfinalen was introduced in 2009 as the first attempt to make an official tournament, but the tournament folded in 2010 after two finals. Ahead of the 2011 season, Norges Fotballforbund and Norsk Toppfotball stated that Superfinalen would be discontinued, stating that the championship was interesting neither from sports nor from a commercial aspect. However, the two would-be qualified teams, league winner Rosenborg and cup winner Strømsgodset, were free to play a pre-season friendly, although it would not be regarded as an official match.

In 2016, after Discovery Communications and TVNorge acquired the rights for the Eliteserien a new attempt was made to arrange a Supercup starting in 2017 under the name UNICEF Mesterfinalen. The first final was played between reigning League and Cup champions Rosenborg and the league runners-up Brann at Brann Stadion.

== Editions ==
=== 2009 ===
The first edition was contested between Stabæk and Vålerenga at Telenor Arena in Bærum on 8 March 2009. It was the first official match to take place at Stabæk's new home ground. Stabæk qualified as winners of the 2008 Tippeligaen, where they finished six points ahead of Fredrikstad. Vålerenga qualified as winners of the 2008 Norwegian Football Cup, where they had won the final 4–1 against Stabæk. As such, Superfinalen became a replay of the previous year's cup final. Stabæk won the match 3–1 after goals by Daniel Nannskog, Daigo Kobayashi and Pálmi Rafn Pálmason. Mohammed Abdellaoue scored for the losing side. Martin Andresen, playing coach for Vålerenga, received two yellow cards.

Match details

8 March 2009
19:00 CET

Stabæk	3–1	Vålerenga
Nannskog 19'; Kobayashi 38'; Pálmason 56'	Report	Abdellaoue 48'

Telenor Arena, Bærum
Attendance: 6,362
Referee: Terje Hauge (Olsvik)

=== 2010 ===
The 2010 edition was contested between Rosenborg BK and Aalesund FK at Color Line Stadion in Ålesund on 7 March 2010. Rosenborg qualified as winners of the 2009 Tippeligaen, where they finished 13 points ahead of Molde. Aalesund qualified as winners of the 2009 Norwegian Football Cup, where they beat Molde in a penalty shootout in the final. Rosenborg won the match 3–1 after leading 2–0 at halftime. Kris Stadsgaard and Rade Prica scored the goals in the first half, and Trond Olsen increased Rosenborg's lead to 3–0 before Aalesund pulled one back, courtesy of Peter Orry Larsen.

Match details

7 March 2010
19:00 CET

Aalesund	1–3	Rosenborg
Larsen 59'	Report	Stadsgaard 7'; Prica 26'; Olsen 49'

Color Line Stadion, Ålesund
Attendance: 3,180
Referee: Tommy Skjerven (Kaupanger)

=== 2017 ===
The 2017 edition was contested between SK Brann and Rosenborg BK at Brann Stadion in Bergen on 29 March 2017. Rosenborg qualified as winners of the 2016 Tippeligaen, where they finished 15 points ahead of Brann. Brann qualified as runners-up in the Tippeligaen, this because Rosenborg won the 2016 Norwegian Football Cup. Rosenborg won the match 2–0 after leading 1–0 at halftime. Milan Jevtovic scored the goal in the first half, and Tore Reginiussen increased Rosenborg's lead to 2–0 in the 90th minute.

Match details

29 March 2017
19:00 CEST

Brann	0–2	Rosenborg
	Report	Jevtović 32'; Reginiussen 90+4'

Brann Stadion, Bergen
Attendance: 10,681
Referee: Svein Oddvar Moen (Haugar)

=== 2018 ===
The 2018 edition was contested between Lillestrøm SK and Rosenborg BK at Åråsen Stadion in Lillestrøm on 25 April 2018. Initially the game was scheduled for 5 March 2018, but the game was cancelled due to the winterly conditions at Åråsen Stadion. Rosenborg qualified as winners of the 2017 Eliteserien, where they finished 7 points ahead of Molde. Lillestrøm qualified as winners of the 2017 Norwegian Football Cup where they defeated Sarpsborg 08 3–2 in the final. Rosenborg won the 2018 Mesterfinalen with the score 0–1. After a goalless first half, Nicklas Bendtner scored the winning goal in the 52nd minute.

Match details

26 April 2018
18:30 CEST

Lillestrøm	0–1	Rosenborg
	Report	Bendtner 52'

Åråsen Stadion, Lillestrøm
Attendance: 4,295
Referee: Tom Harald Hagen (Grue)

=== 2019 ===
The 2019 edition was to be contested between Rosenborg BK and Molde FK at Ullevaal Stadion in Oslo. Rosenborg qualified as winners of the 2018 Eliteserien, where they finished 5 points ahead of Molde. Molde qualified as runners-up in Eliteserien as Rosenborg also won the 2018 Norwegian Football Cup, but due to extreme weather conditions the games was cancelled 2 days prior to the scheduled matchday.

== Venues ==
Hosts
Ground	Hosts	Years
Telenor Arena, Bærum	1	2009
Color Line Stadion, Ålesund	1	2010
Brann Stadion, Bergen	1	2017
Åråsen Stadion, Lillestrøm	1	2018
~~Ullevaal Stadion, Oslo~~	~~1~~	~~2019~~

The fixture is usually played at the home ground of one of the teams competing. The first exception would have been the 2019 final, when defending league champions Rosenborg decided that the final should be held at Ullevaal Stadion. In total there have been five host grounds. The first ground to host the fixture was Telenor Arena in 2009. The 2009 final is the only game hosted by the league champions.

== Records ==
- The most successful team in the competition is Rosenborg (3 wins).
- The highest scoring games were the 2009 and 2010 finals. Stabæk's 3–1 win against Vålerenga in 2009 was equaled by Rosenborg's 3–1 win against Aalesund in 2010.
- Rosenborg hold the record for most consecutive wins (3) from 2010 to 2018.
- Kris Stadsgaard has scored the fastest goal in a Norwegian super cup. In 2010 he scored in the 7th minute in the final between Aalesund and Rosenborg.
- Brann are the only club to participate in Mesterfinalen, not qualified as either champions of the League or the Cup.

== Performances ==
=== Performance by club ===
Club	Winners	Runners-up	Cup-winning years	Years as runners-up
Rosenborg	3	–	2010, 2017, 2018	–
Stabæk	1	–	2009	–
Aalesund	–	1	–	2010
Vålerenga	–	1	–	2009
Brann	–	1	–	2017
Lillestrøm	–	1	–	2018

=== Total cup wins by city ===
City	Won	Clubs
Trondheim	3	Rosenborg (3)
Bærum	1	Stabæk (1)
