= Mix Diskerud =

American football player (born 1990)

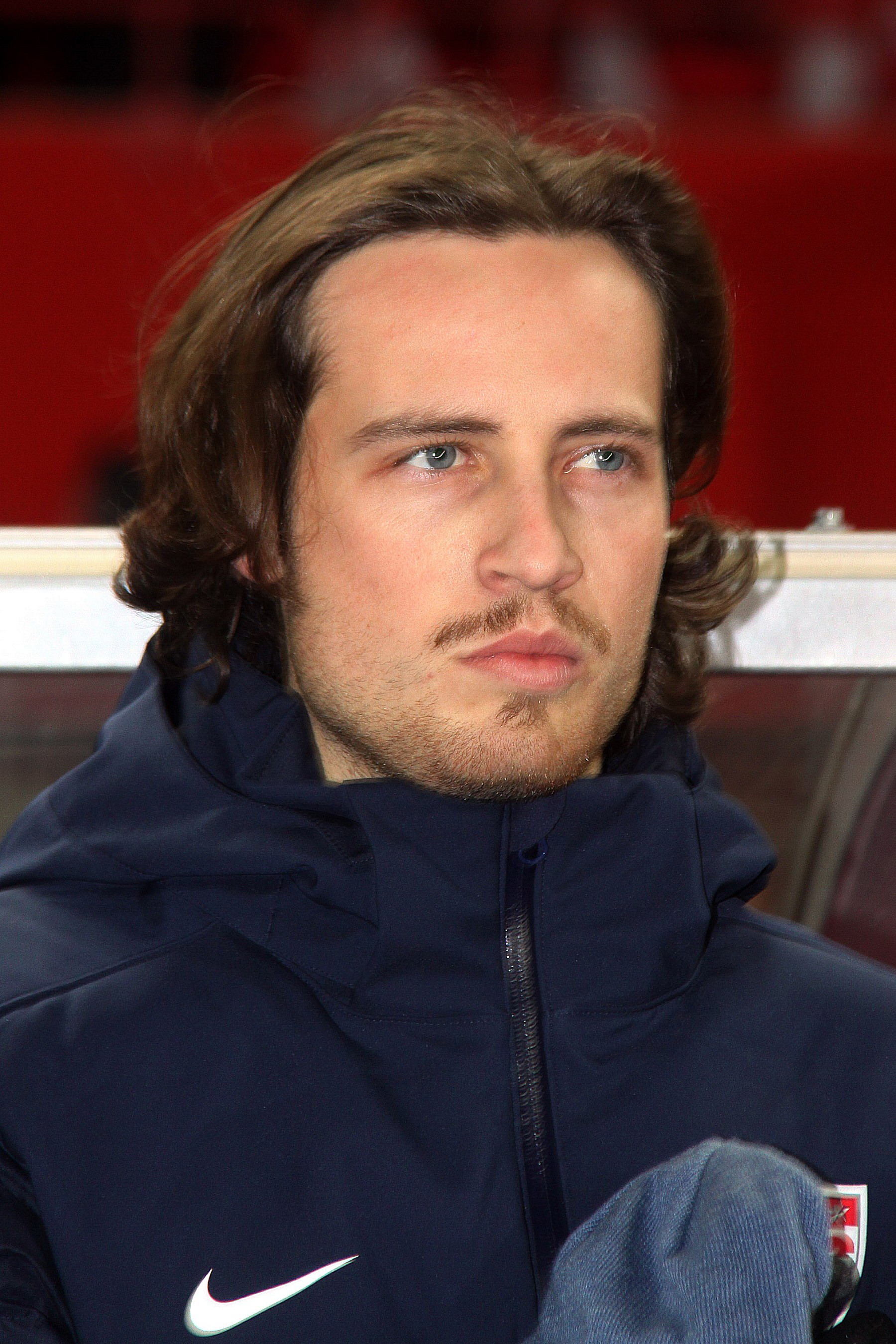
- Diskerud with the United States in 2013

Personal information
- Full name: Mikkel Morgenstar Pålssønn Diskerud
- Date of birth: October 2, 1990 (age 36)
- Place of birth: Oslo, Norway
- Height: 6 ft 1/2 in (1.84 m)
- Position: Central midfielder

Youth career
- 2005–2008: Stabæk

Senior career*
Years	Team	Apps	(Gls)
2008–2012	Stabæk	81	(10)
2012	→ Gent (loan)	6	(0)
2012–2014	Rosenborg	59	(5)
2015–2017	New York City	39	(4)
2017	→ IFK Göteborg (loan)	29	(5)
2018–2021	Manchester City	0	(0)
2018	→ IFK Göteborg (loan)	12	(2)
2018–2019	→ Ulsan Hyundai (loan)	48	(8)
2020	→ Helsingborgs IF (loan)	28	(2)
2021	Denizlispor	18	(2)
2021–2023	Omonia	43	(2)

International career^{‡}
2008–2009	United States U20	6	(1)
2008–2009	Norway U19	5	(0)
2012	United States U23	4	(1)
2010–2016	United States	38	(6)
Medal record
Representing United States
Winner	CONCACAF Gold Cup	2013
Men's Soccer
- * Club domestic league appearances and goals as of 20:18, December 28, 2022 (UTC) ‡ National team caps and goals as of January 6, 2021 (UTC)

Mikkel Morgenstar Pålssønn "Mix" Diskerud (born October 2, 1990) is a former professional soccer player who played as a midfielder. Born in Norway, he represented the United States national team. A full international since 2010, he has won 38 caps and scored 6 goals for the United States national team, and was a part of their 2014 FIFA World Cup squad.

His mother coined his nickname "Mix" when he was learning to walk, as he was energetic and ran around the house like a mixmaster.

== Club career ==
=== Stabæk ===
Born in Oslo to an American mother and Norwegian father, Diskerud started his career in Frigg, and was discovered by Stabæk during a district tournament in Oslo. He joined their junior team in 2005, at the same time attending the sport school Norwegian College of Elite Sport. Starting in the 2006 season, he played regularly for the club's B team in the Norwegian Second Division over the next seasons. In 2008, he also helped the club's junior team win the Norwegian Junior Cup (U-19).

He made his debut for the first team in a 2008 Norwegian Football Cup match against Vestfossen. He was then named in the starting eleven in the 2009 La Manga Cup, scoring after two minutes in his first match. He also played as a substitute in the Super Final, the Norwegian Super Cup, one week before the league opener. He was benched in the opening match, but in the second match against Brann, he was allowed to make his debut in a regular first-team match. He came in as a substitute some ten minutes before full-time and scored the equalizer in the 84th minute; the game ended 1–1.

=== K.A.A. Gent ===
Diskerud was loaned to Belgian Pro League club Gent for the latter part of the 2011–12 season.

=== Rosenborg ===
In August 2012, Diskerud moved to Tippeligaen club Rosenborg until the end of the 2012. After an aborted move to the Portland Timbers in late 2012 Diskerud signed an extension with Rosenborg.

Diskerud scored Rosenborg's equalizing goal in the final of the Norwegian Football Cup, but it proved to be only a consolation as the club lost 4–2 to Molde.

=== New York City FC ===
In January 2015, Diskerud signed with New York City. He scored New York City's first ever MLS goal in an inaugural match draw with Orlando City.

In March 2017, New York City bought out Diskerud's contract, releasing him before the beginning of the 2017 season. He remained an NYCFC player and registered with New York City FC. Shortly after, the U.S. international was rumoured to be close to securing a loan to Swedish side IFK Goteborg which would provide "minor salary relief" for New York City FC although they would still remain responsible for paying the bulk of the player's wages.

As part of ESPN FC's MLS Confidential annual anonymous player poll in 2017 which surveyed over 140 of the league's current players, Diskerud was named as "the most overrated player in the league"—receiving 16% of the overall vote.

==== Loan to IFK Göteborg ====
In March 2017, Diskerud signed on loan for IFK Göteborg after failing to cement his place with New York City FC. His loan expired in late August 2017.

=== Manchester City ===
In January 2018, Diskerud was announced to have signed a four-and-a-half-year contract with Premier League club Manchester City, with a source saying he would be training with the club's EDS.

==== Return to IFK Göteborg ====
Shortly after joining Manchester City Diskerud re-signed on loan for Göteborg until the end of the season.

==== Loan to Ulsan Hyundai ====
Diskerud was loaned to South Korean side Ulsan Hyundai for a year on July 18, 2018.

==== Loan to Helsingborg ====
In June 2020, Swedish Allsvenskan side Helsingborgs IF signed Diskerud on a short-term loan. Before he even played a match for the team he was in trouble after he sent a tweet. It was after the first game of the season, which HIF lost with 0–3 against Varbergs BoIS he tweeted ''Okay, one positive thing is that 3 points were taken by a team from västkusten. Go västkusten''. That was something which the HIF supporters didn't like. He made his debut in 18 June in an away game against Kalmar FF, which ended with a 4–0 loss. Diskerud played 45 minutes in that game.

=== Denizlispor ===
On January 20, 2021, Diskerud signed a one-and-a-half-year deal with Turkish Süper Lig club Denizlispor.

=== Omonia ===
On July 1, 2021, Diskerud signed for Cypriot First Division club Omonia Nicosia. He helped Omonia win the Cypriot Cup in 2022 and 2023; he was in the starting lineup for the final in both seasons. Diskerud left the club in June 2023.

== International career ==
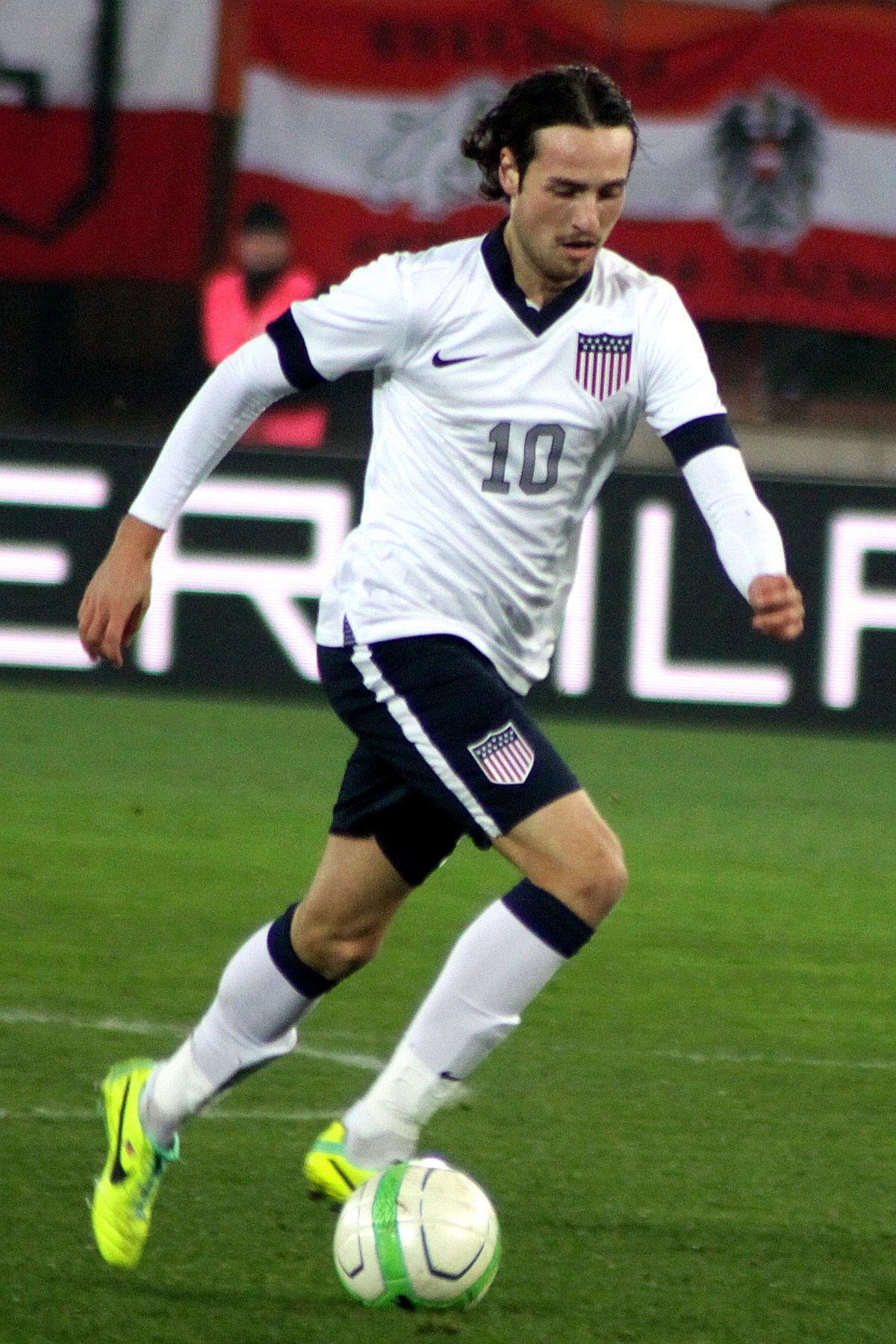
Diskerud with the U.S. national team

Diskerud's mother is from Arizona, making him eligible to represent the United States. He was also a Norwegian citizen making him also eligible to play for Norway. While Diskerud was playing for Norway, United States U-20 coach Thomas Rongen approached him as he was preparing to take a corner, and asked if he had an American passport, to which Diskerud answered, "yes." In April 2008 he played a tournament for the United States under-20s team, recording three assists during a game against Northern Ireland. A month later, he played for the Norwegian under-18's team against the United States. In February 2009, when asked about his future plans for international play, he replied that it does not really matter which country he represents. He used the phrase "first-come, first-served", meaning that he will respond to the first international call-up from either country. In March 2009 he played for the Norwegian under-19's team. He later stated that he would likely accept any future call-ups from U.S. Soccer but had not heard from them since the youth tournament in 2008.

Only weeks later, after several strong performances for his Norwegian club, Stabæk, he was contacted by U.S. Soccer about attending an under-20s camp in May 2009. He had to turn down the invitation due to his role in Stabæk and that the camp schedule conflicts with the Norwegian season. However, Diskerud traveled with the U.S. under-20 team to Egypt in June 2009 for one of two friendlies, and he scored his first goal against Egypt. His appearance in the Egyptian friendly signaled his final choice for international play for the United States, saying "I am a Norwegian-American. I would love to play for both countries, but I can't."

Diskerud debuted for the senior team in 2010. He was a member of the squad that won the 2013 Gold Cup. He later was a member of the squad for the 2014 World Cup, although he failed to make an appearance at the tournament. On September 10, 2013, in Columbus, Ohio, Diskerud assisted on Landon Donovan's goal in a World Cup Qualifier against Mexico. It was Donovan's last goal for the United States Men's National Team.

== Career statistics ==
=== Club ===
As of match played 28 May 2023

Appearances and goals by club, season and competition
Club	Season	League			National cup (Note: Includes Norwegian Football Cup, U.S. Open Cup, Svenska Cupen, Korean FA Cup, Cypriot Cup)		Continental		Other		Total	
Club	Season	Division	Apps	Goals	Apps	Goals	Apps	Goals	Apps	Goals	Apps	Goals
Stabæk	2008	Tippeligaen	0	0	2	0	—		—		2	0
Stabæk	2009	Tippeligaen	21	3	4	1	5 (Note: Three appearances in UEFA Champions League, two appearances in UEFA Europa League)	0	1 (Note: Appearance in Superfinalen)	0	31	4
Stabæk	2010	Tippeligaen	30	4	3	2	2 (Note: Appearances in UEFA Europa League)	0	—		35	6
Stabæk	2011	Tippeligaen	30	3	3	0	—		—		33	3
Stabæk	Total		81	10	12	3	7	0	1	0	101	13
Gent (loan)	2011–12	Belgian Pro League	6	0	0	0	—		—		6	0
Rosenborg	2012	Tippeligaen	11	1	0	0	7	1	—		18	2
Rosenborg	2013	Tippeligaen	26	2	5	1	0	0	—		31	3
Rosenborg	2014	Tippeligaen	22	2	2	0	5	2	—		29	4
Rosenborg	Total		59	5	7	1	12	3	0	0	78	9
New York City	2015	Major League Soccer	27	3	1	0	—		—		28	3
New York City	2016	Major League Soccer	12	1	1	0	0	0	—		13	1
New York City	Total		39	4	2	0	0	0	0	0	41	4
IFK Göteborg (loan)	2017	Allsvenskan	29	5	1	0	—		—		30	5
IFK Göteborg (loan)	2018	Allsvenskan	12	2	4	2	—		—		16	4
IFK Göteborg (loan)	Total		41	7	5	2	0	0	0	0	46	9
Ulsan Hyundai (loan)	2018	K League 1	17	2	4	0	—		—		21	2
Ulsan Hyundai (loan)	2019	K League 1	31	6	1	0	8 (Note: Appearances in AFC Champions League)	3	—		40	9
Ulsan Hyundai (loan)	Total		48	8	5	0	8	3	0	0	61	11
Helsingborg (loan)	2020	Allsvenskan	28	2	1	0	—		—		29	2
Denizlispor	2020–21	Süper Lig	18	2	0	0	—		—		18	2
Omonia	2021–22	Cypriot First Division	23	2	6	0	10 (Note: Two appearances in UEFA Champions League, four appearances in UEFA Europa League, four appearances in UEFA Europa Conference League)	0	0	0	39	2
Omonia	2022–23	Cypriot First Division	20	0	3	1	7	0	1 (Note: Appearance in Cypriot Super Cup)	0	31	1
Omonia	Total		43	2	9	1	17	0	1	0	70	3
Career total			343	40	38	6	43	6	2	0	426	52

=== International ===
International goals

#	Date	Venue	Opponent	Score	Result	Competition
1.	November 14, 2012	Kuban Stadium, Krasnodar, Russia	Russia	2–2	2–2	Friendly
2.	July 21, 2013	M&T Bank Stadium, Baltimore, United States	El Salvador	5–1	5–1	2013 CONCACAF Gold Cup
3.	May 27, 2014	Candlestick Park, San Francisco, United States	Azerbaijan	1–0	2–0	Friendly
4.	October 10, 2014	Rentscher Field, East Hartford, United States	Ecuador	1–0	1–1	Friendly
5.	November 18, 2014	Aviva Stadium, Dublin, Ireland	Republic of Ireland	1–1	1–4	Friendly
6.	June 10, 2015	RheinEnergieStadion, Cologne, Germany	Germany	1–1	2–1	Friendly

== Honors ==
Stabæk

- Superfinalen: 2009

Omonia

- Cypriot Cup: 2021–22, 2022–23
- Cypriot Super Cup: 2021

United States

- CONCACAF Gold Cup: 2013
