= Andreas Strand (footballer) =

Norwegian footballer (born 1978)

Personal information
- Date of birth: 10 June 1978 (age 48)
- Height: 1.94 m (6 ft 4 in)
- Position: Forward

Senior career*
Years	Team	Apps	(Gls)
- Rakkestad
1999–2003	Drøbak-Frogn		
2004–2005	Follo		
2006–2007	Stabæk	11	(0)
2007	→ Moss (loan)	14	(1)
2007–2009	Follo		
2010–2012	Mysen		

Managerial career
- 2021–: Askim (assistant)
- * Club domestic league appearances and goals

Andreas Strand (born 10 June 1978) is a retired Norwegian football striker.

He hails from Trømborg. After playing several years in Drøbak-Frogn he went to Follo and scored 11 goals in 2005 1. divisjon. He then caught a career break in 2006 when he signed for first-tier club Stabæk. In 2007 he was loaned out to Moss, but after half the season he was wanted by neither Stabæk or Moss. He was paid out of his contract and returned to Follo. From 2010 to 2012 he finished his career in Mysen.

In 2005 Strand failed a doping test for cannabis, but as he explained that he probably ingested it from a chocolate cake at a party, he was cleared from a doping charge by the Norwegian Confederation of Sports.

In 2021 he became assistant manager of Askim.
