= Kjell André Thu =

Norwegian footballer (born 1984)

Personal information
- Date of birth: 8 July 1984 (age 42)
- Position: Defender

Senior career*
Years	Team	Apps	(Gls)
–2004	Ørn-Horten		
2005–2006	Sandefjord	13	(0)
2006	→ Ørn-Horten (loan)		
2007	Skeid	14	(0)
2008	Eidsvold Turn		
2009	Sarpsborg 08	8	(0)
2010–2014	Ørn-Horten		
2015–2016	Skoppum		

International career
2002	Norway U18	11	(1)
2003	Norway U19	9	(0)
2006	Norway U21	1	(0)

Managerial career
- 2016–2022: Ørn-Horten
- 2023–2024: Egersund
- 2025: Jerv
- 2026–: Stabæk
- * Club domestic league appearances and goals

Kjell André Thu (born 8 July 1984) is a Norwegian football manager and former player.

Thu was a regular player for Norway U18 and U19 in 2002 and 2003. He was a squad member for the 2003 UEFA European Under-19 Championship.

Thu started his career in FK Ørn Horten, and reached the First Division with the team. He got a chance in Eliteserien for Sandefjord before returning to the First Division with Skeid and Sarpsborg 08.

Thu became co-coach of Ørn Horten with Trym Bergman in 2016, and sole manager from 2017. Thu became noticed as a manager when leading Ørn Horten to promotion from the 2021 3. divisjon and survived in the 2022 2. divisjon. He then took over Egersunds IK, and immediately won promotion from the 2023 2. divisjon.

After a period away from club football he took over FK Jerv in June 2025. Ahead of the 2026 season he took over Stabæk. He was then dubbed a "miracle man" in local media, because when Thu managed Egersund, his team managed to bounce back from a 4–0 deficit to win 4–5.

== Honours ==
Individual

- Norwegian First Division Coach of the Month: April 2024
