= Harmeet Singh (footballer) =

Norwegian footballer (born 1990)

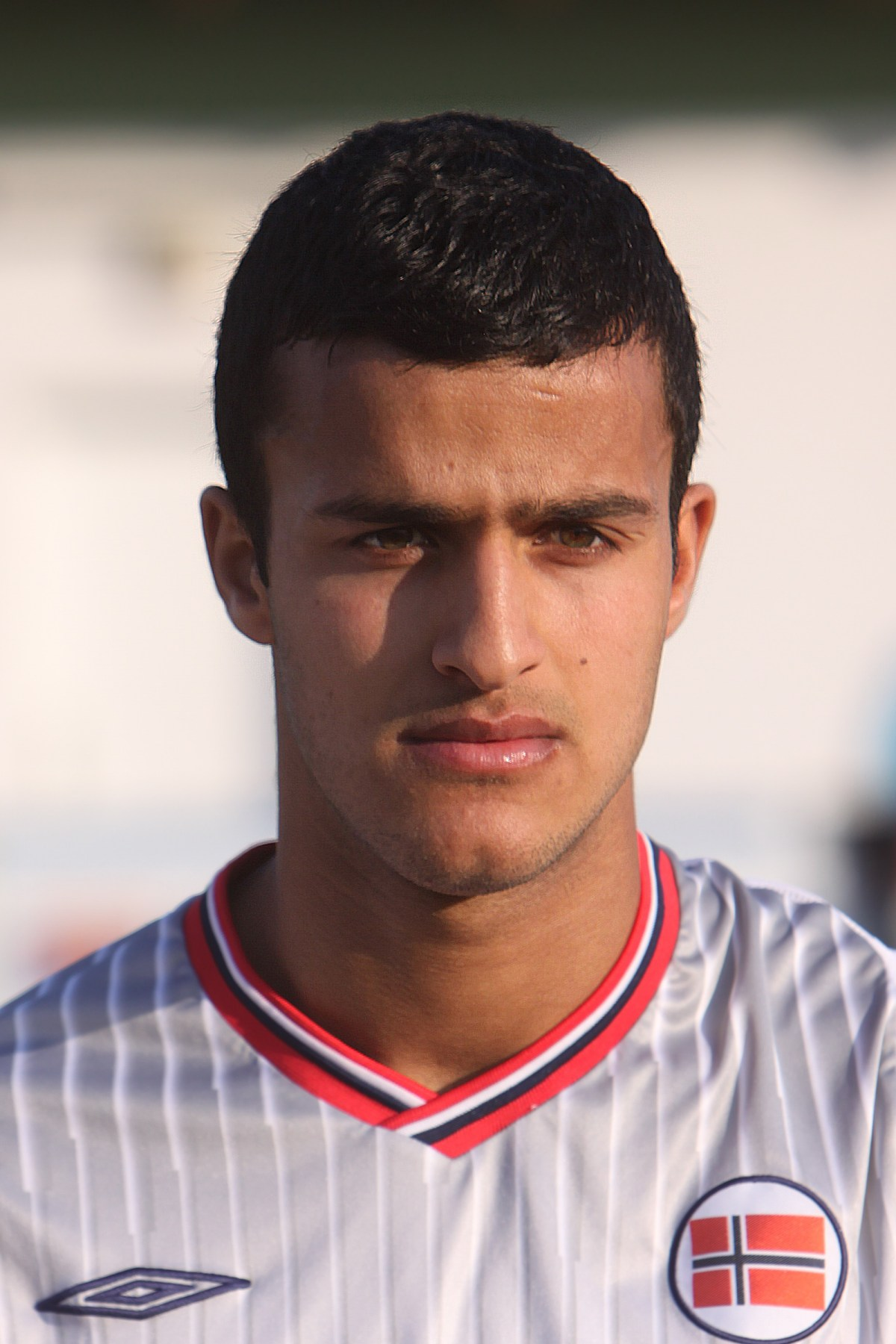
- Singh with Norway U21 in 2011

Personal information
- Date of birth: 12 November 1990 (age 35)
- Place of birth: Oslo, Norway
- Height: 1.80 m (5 ft 11 in)
- Position: Defensive midfielder

Youth career
- –2002: Furuset Fotball
- 2003–2007: Vålerenga

Senior career*
Years	Team	Apps	(Gls)
2007–2012	Vålerenga	101	(8)
2012–2014	Feyenoord	7	(0)
2014–2015	Molde	53	(4)
2016	FC Midtjylland	0	(0)
2016–2017	Molde	26	(5)
2017	Wisła Płock	1	(0)
2017–2018	Kalmar FF	10	(0)
2018–2019	Sarpsborg 08	28	(1)
2019	HJK	11	(0)
2020–2022	Sandefjord	45	(3)

International career
2005	Norway U15	7	(3)
2006	Norway U16	13	(2)
2007	Norway U17	14	(2)
2008	Norway U18	5	(0)
2008–2009	Norway U19	11	(0)
2008–2013	Norway U21	36	(5)
2013–2014	Norway U23	3	(0)
2012–2014	Norway	7	(0)
- * Club domestic league appearances and goals

Harmeet Singh (born 12 November 1990) is a Norwegian former professional footballer who played as a defensive midfielder.

== Personal life ==
Singh was born into an Indian Punjabi Sikh family. Singh has said that his religious background has also had an impact on him, and that as he ages, he senses a greater obligation to engage in charitable acts "because it's a significant duty as a Sikh".

== Club career ==
=== Vålerenga ===
Singh made his league debut under Martin Andresen in a 1–1 draw against Rosenborg BK in 2008. Singh's goal on 23 September 2009 against Molde in the semi-final of the 2009 Norwegian Football Cup, was nominated Goal of the Year in Norway in 2009.

In a friendly game with Vålerenga, former FC Barcelona manager Pep Guardiola praised Singh heavily after the game in which he scored a goal. With Vålerenga he won the 2008 Norwegian Football Cup and became runner-up in the 2009 Superfinalen and the 2010 Tippeligaen.

=== Feyenoord ===
On 5 July 2012, it was officially announced that he would join Dutch side Feyenoord on a two-year contract with an option for a third and fourth season for a transfer fee of €300,000. In Rotterdam he will play with squad number 16 alongside fellow Norwegian Omar Elabdellaoui who came over on a season long loan from Manchester City. Singh stated that he was delighted to play for a team in which players like Dirk Kuyt, Robin van Persie and Roy Makaay played before.

Singh made a total of seven appearances, six as a substitute during the 2012–13 season, and was an unused substitute in 23 matches. Singh asked to go on loan to another club ahead of the 2013–14 season, and he was close on joining NEC Nijmegen but the transfer did not happen. Towards the end of September 2013, Singh had not featured for Feyenoord during the new season, and stated that he wanted to leave the club in the next transfer window unless he managed to play more for the first team.

=== Molde ===
On 19 February 2014, it was announced that Singh had signed a two-year deal with Molde after leaving Feyenoord on a free transfer.

=== FC Midtjylland ===
On 1 February 2016, it was confirmed, that FC Midtjylland had signed a 3-year contract with Singh.

=== Molde return ===
On 11 March 2016, Singh's contract with FC Midtjylland was cancelled due to failing to settle in Denmark, and he returned to Molde FK, signing an 18-month contract with the club.

=== Wisła Płock ===
On 23 March 2017, Singh signed for Ekstraklasa side Wisła Płock on an 18-month contract. After only two months and one game played, the club announced that Singh had asked for termination of his contract due to personal and family reasons.

=== HJK ===
On 15 March 2019, HJK announced the signing of Singh on a two-year contract. After making 11 appearances all season, Singh's contract was terminated with mutual understanding on 9 January 2020.

== International career ==
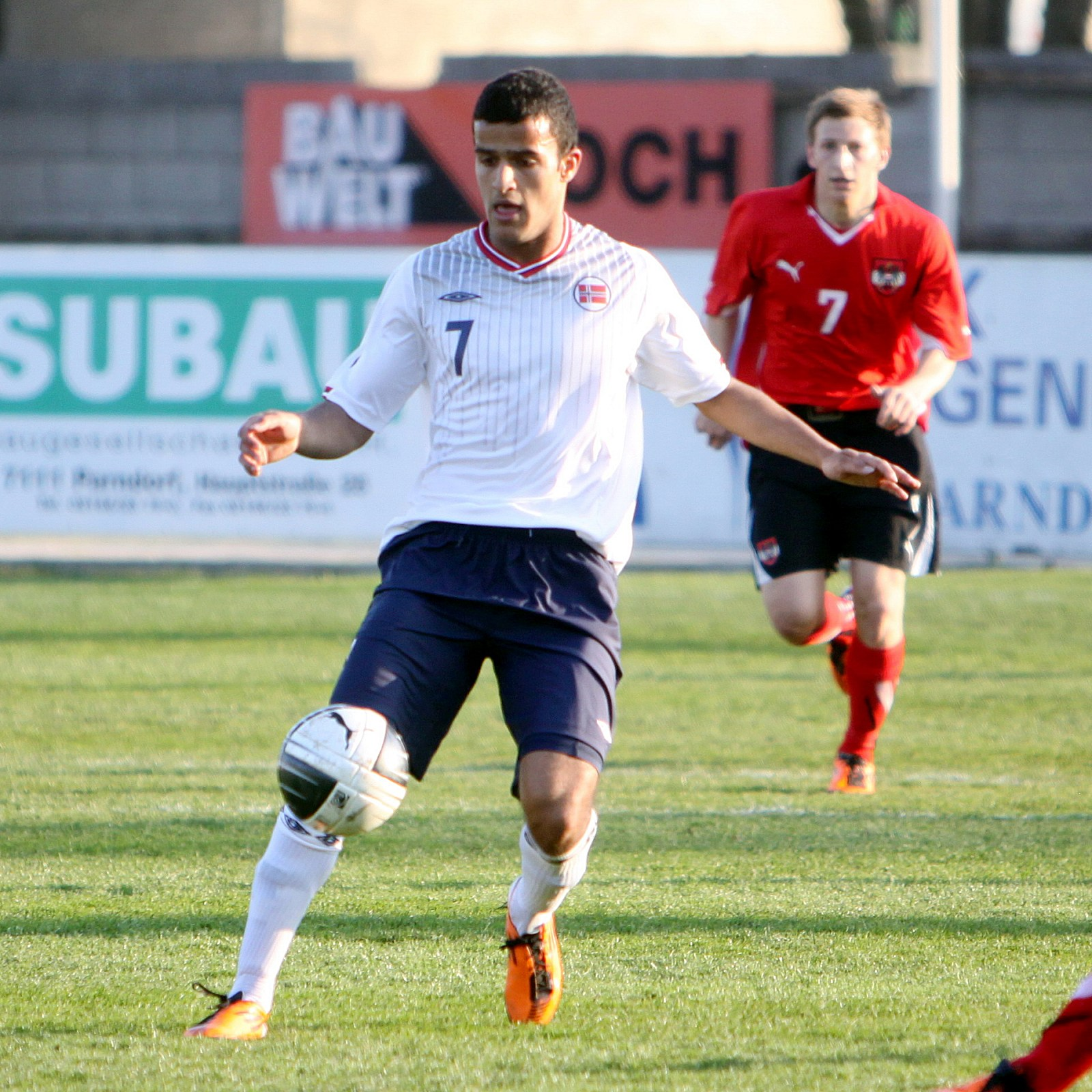
Harmeet Singh playing for Norway U21 in 2011.

Singh has represented Norway at the U15, U16, U17, U18, U19 and U21 levels. On 5 June 2009, at just 18 years of age, he made his debut for the U21s in a 1–1 draw against Estonia U21.

Singh made his debut for the senior team when he replaced Simen Brenne at half time in a 1–1 friendly draw against Denmark on 15 January 2012. He featured in all three matches in the 2012 King's Cup.

== Style of play ==
Singh plays as a deep-lying midfielder. He is nicknamed "The Norwegian Iniesta" by international media.

== Recognition ==
In 2010, Singh was listed as one of the "100 greatest talents out of the world" by the Spanish football newspaper Don Balón.

Singh received a 'Special Recognition Award' at the 2013 Asian Football Awards.

== Career statistics ==
As of 24 April 2022

Appearances and goals by club, season and competition
Club	Season	League			Cup		Continental		Total	
Club	Season	Division	Apps	Goals	Apps	Goals	Apps	Goals	Apps	Goals
Vålerenga	2007	Tippeligaen	0	0	1	0	0	0	1	0
Vålerenga	2008	Tippeligaen	9	0	3	0	—		12	0
Vålerenga	2009	Tippeligaen	25	1	6	2	2	0	33	3
Vålerenga	2010	Tippeligaen	30	5	1	0	—		31	5
Vålerenga	2011	Tippeligaen	27	2	2	2	4	0	33	4
Vålerenga	2012	Tippeligaen	10	0	1	0	—		11	0
Vålerenga	Total		101	8	14	4	6	0	121	12
Feyenoord	2012–13	Eredivisie	7	0	0	0	1	0	8	0
Feyenoord	2013–14	Eredivisie	0	0	0	0	—		0	0
Feyenoord	Total		7	0	0	0	1	0	8	0
Molde	2014	Tippeligaen	28	3	5	0	4	0	37	3
Molde	2015	Tippeligaen	25	1	2	0	11	1	38	2
Molde	2016	Tippeligaen	26	5	1	0	0	0	27	5
Molde	Total		79	9	8	0	15	1	102	10
Wisła Płock	2016–17	Ekstraklasa	1	0	0	0	—		1	0
Kalmar	2017	Allsvenskan	10	0	0	0	0	0	10	0
Sarpsborg 08	2018	Eliteserien	28	1	0	0	8	0	36	1
HJK	2019	Veikkausliiga	11	0	0	0	0	0	11	0
Sandefjord	2020	Eliteserien	9	2	0	0	0	0	9	2
Sandefjord	2021	Eliteserien	22	0	0	0	0	0	22	0
Sandefjord	2022	Eliteserien	2	0	0	0	0	0	2	0
Sandefjord	Total		33	2	0	0	0	0	33	2
Career total			270	20	22	4	30	1	322	25

== Honours ==
Vålerenga

- Norwegian Cup: 2008

Molde

- Tippeligaen: 2014
- Norwegian Cup: 2014

== See also ==
- List of Sikh footballers
