= Morten Skjønsberg =

Norwegian footballer (born 1983)

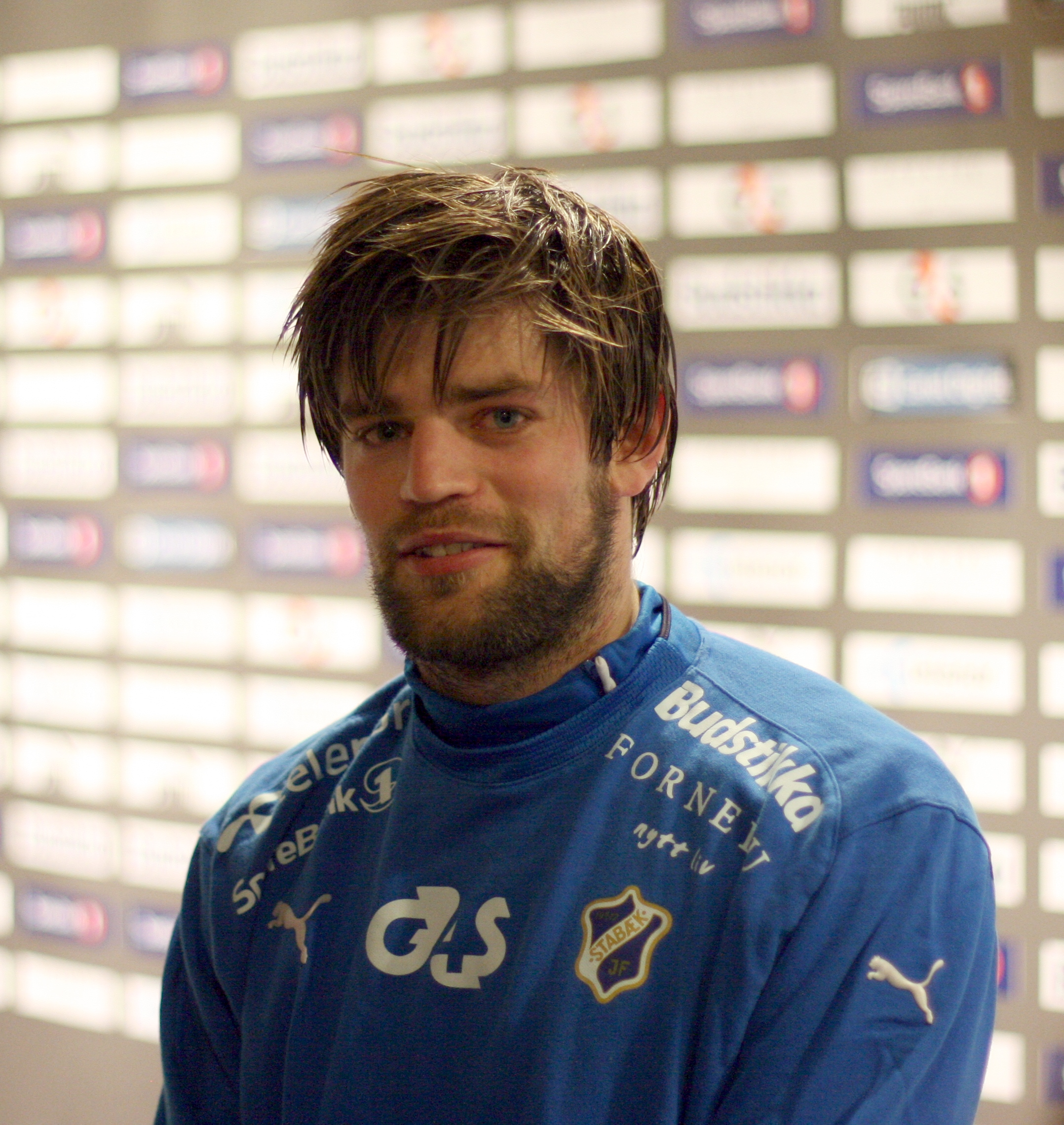

Personal information
- Full name: Morten Morisbak Skjønsberg
- Date of birth: 12 February 1983 (age 43)
- Place of birth: Bærum, Norway
- Height: 1.83 m (6 ft 0 in)
- Position: Defender

Senior career*
Years	Team	Apps	(Gls)
2001–2011	Stabæk	215	(1)
2012–2014	IFK Norrköping	67	(0)
2014–2017	Stabæk	105	(1)

International career^{‡}
2003–2005	Norway U21	20	(1)
2008	Norway	1	(0)
- * Club domestic league appearances and goals as of 27 January 2018 ‡ National team caps and goals as of 15 August 2008

Morten Morisbak Skjønsberg (born 12 February 1983) is a Norwegian former footballer. As a player Skjønsberg was a versatile defender who played anywhere across the back line. In the early years of his career, he usually played at right-back, but was later converted to central defender.

== Career ==
=== Club career ===
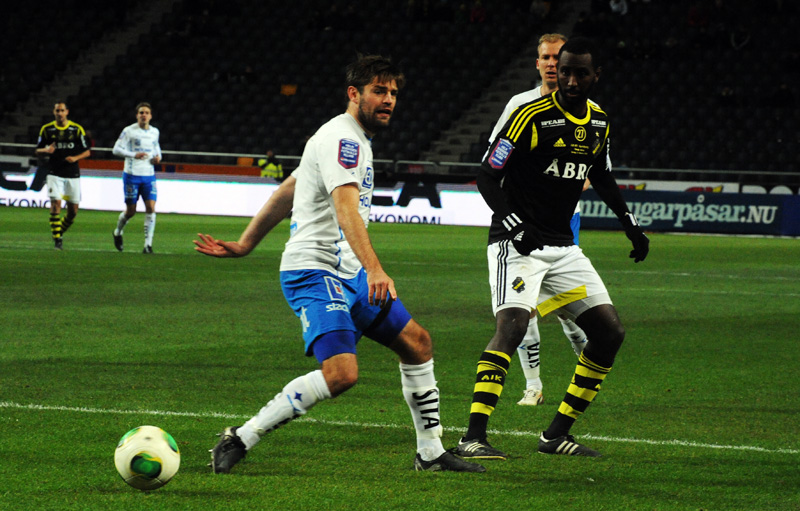
Skjønsberg playing for IFK Norrköping in a 2013 Allsvenskan game against AIK.

Skjønsberg made his debut for Stabæk in 2002. By the end of the 2007 season, he had played 114 league games for the club. On 3 August 2008, he scored his first league goal for Stabæk, against Bodø/Glimt. On 10 January 2012 he transferred to Swedish club IFK Norrköping. He came back to Stabæk in 2014 and was an important part of the team until he retired after the 2017 season. He has the record for most league and total appearances for Stabæk.

=== International career ===
At international level, Skjønsberg played 20 times for Norway U-21, and in August 2008, he got his first call-up to the senior national team.

On 19 November 2008, he got his first and only senior cap, when he came on as a substitute against Ukraine in Dnipropetrovsk.

== Career statistics ==
As of 27 January 2018

Season	Club	Division	League		Cup		Total	
Season	Club	Division	Apps	Goals	Apps	Goals	Apps	Goals
2001	Stabæk	Tippeligaen	0	0	0	0	0	0
2002	Stabæk	Tippeligaen	2	0	1	0	3	0
2003	Stabæk	Tippeligaen	11	0	2	0	13	0
2004	Stabæk	Tippeligaen	21	0	5	0	26	0
2005	Stabæk	Adeccoligaen	28	0	5	1	33	1
2006	Stabæk	Tippeligaen	26	0	2	0	28	0
2007	Stabæk	Tippeligaen	26	0	6	0	32	0
2008	Stabæk	Tippeligaen	25	1	6	0	31	1
2009	Stabæk	Tippeligaen	27	0	4	0	31	0
2010	Stabæk	Tippeligaen	19	0	0	0	19	0
2011	Stabæk	Tippeligaen	30	0	3	0	33	0
2012	Norrköping	Allsvenskan	28	0	0	0	28	0
2013	Norrköping	Allsvenskan	30	0	0	0	30	0
2014	Norrköping	Allsvenskan	9	0	0	0	9	0
2014	Stabæk	Tippeligaen	15	0	3	0	18	0
2015	Stabæk	Tippeligaen	30	0	5	0	35	0
2016	Stabæk	Tippeligaen	30	0	2	0	32	0
2017	Stabæk	Eliteserien	30	1	1	0	31	1
Career total			387	2	45	1	432	3

== Honours ==
Stabaek

- Tippeligaen: 2008
- Superfinalen: 2009
- 1. divisjon: 2005
- Norwegian Football Cup runner-up: 2008
