= Mohammed Abdellaoue =

Norwegian footballer (born 1985)

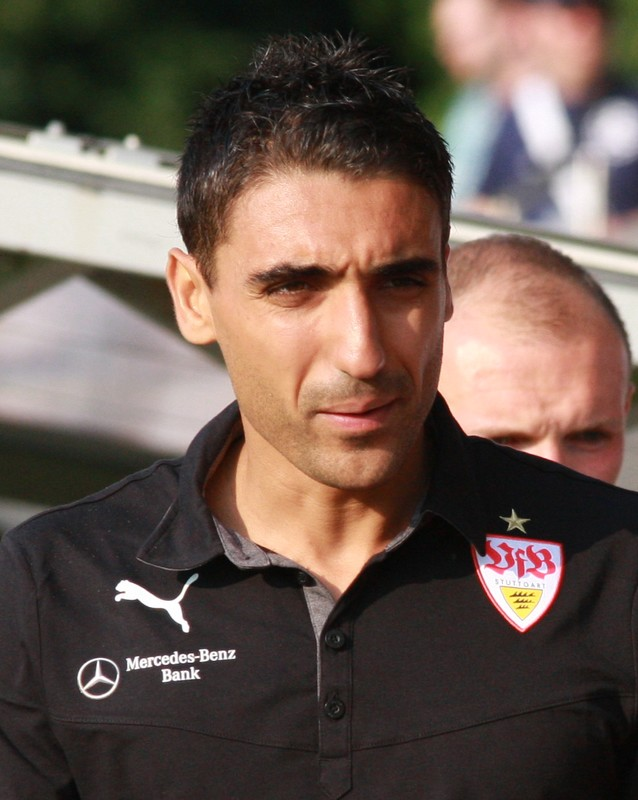
- Abdellaoue with VfB Stuttgart in 2013

Personal information
- Date of birth: 23 October 1985 (age 41)
- Place of birth: Oslo, Norway
- Height: 1.82 m (6 ft 0 in)
- Position: Striker

Youth career
- 1997–2000: Hasle-Løren
- 2001–2003: Skeid

Senior career*
| Years | Team | Apps | (Gls) |
| 2003–2007 | Skeid | 86 | (40) |
| 2008–2010 | Vålerenga | 67 | (30) |
| 2010–2013 | Hannover 96 | 80 | (29) |
| 2013–2015 | VfB Stuttgart | 12 | (1) |
| 2015–2017 | Vålerenga | 34 | (9) |
| Total | | 279 | (109) |

International career
| 2003 | Norway U18 | 6 | (3) |
| 2004 | Norway U19 | 1 | (0) |
| 2005 | Norway U21 | 1 | (0) |
| 2008–2017 | Norway | 33 | (7) |
- * Club domestic league appearances and goals

Mohammed "Moa" Abdellaoue (Arabic: محمد عبد اللاوي; born 23 October 1985) is a Norwegian former professional footballer who played as a striker. He started his career with Skeid and Vålerenga before moving to Germany where he played for Hannover 96 and VfB Stuttgart. After returning to Vålerenga he ended his career due to knee problems. At international level, Abdellaoue represented the Norway national team.

== Club career ==
=== Early career ===
Abdellaoue was born in Oslo and played for Hasle-Løren and Skeid as a youth player. Before joining Skeid's first team squad in 2003 he had to have corrective surgery to his left foot due to the fact he was born with only four toes, something which was never a hindrance before top flight football. He made his debut on 9 June 2003, when he came on as a substitute against Hødd. In his fourth game of the season, he scored his first two goals in a 2–1 win over Raufoss. Abdellaoue scored a total of 42 league goals for Skeid in five seasons, and was their top scorer in 2004 and 2007. He appeared once for the Norwegian under-21 team, six times for the under-18 team and once for under-19 team.

=== Vålerenga ===
At the end of the 2007 season, he signed a three-year contract with Vålerenga, transferring to his new club on 15 November. During his first season, he became the club's top goalscorer in the league with nine goals in 23 appearances, including a hat-trick of penalties in one game, earning him his debut for the Norway national team against the Republic of Ireland. Abdellaoue scored six goals in the 2008 Norwegian Cup, including two goals in the final itself, in which Vålerenga defeated Stabæk 4–1 to become Norwegian cup champions.

=== Hannover 96 ===
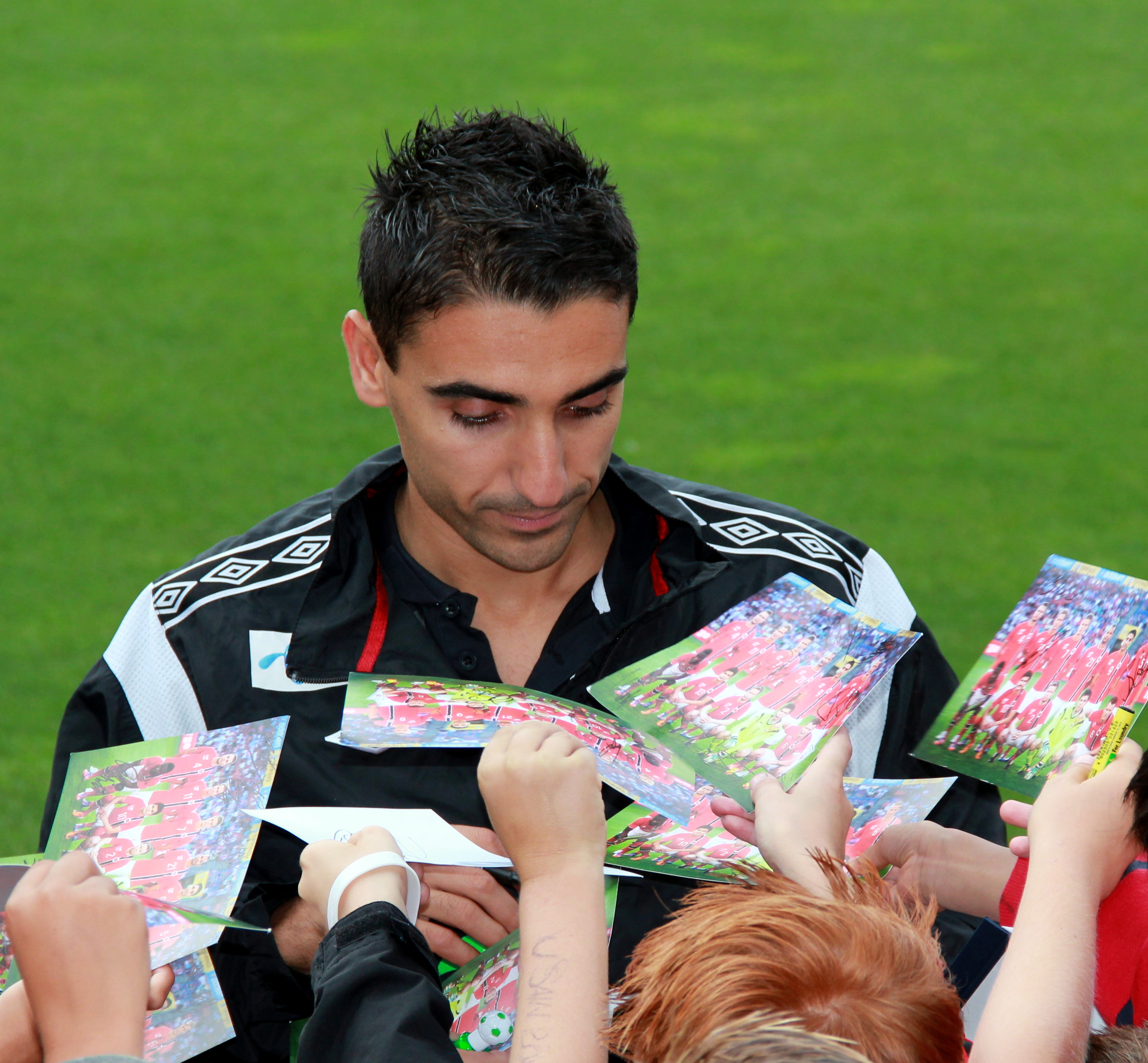
Mohammed Abdellaoue signing autographs for fans in 2012.

On 17 August 2010, Vålerenga and Hannover 96 reported on their official websites that Abdellaoue would be joining the Bundesliga club on a four-year contract, and it was reported that the transfer fee was around €1.2–1.4 million. He made his Bundesliga debut in a 2–1 home win against Eintracht Frankfurt on 21 August 2010, and he scored his first Bundesliga goal on 28 August 2010 against Schalke 04 in a 2–1 away win. The following match against Bayer Leverkusen he scored his first goal at home as Hannover 96 failed to secure a safe win having gone 2–0 up. And in the next match he scored his third goal of the season in a 4–1 home win – making it the result. And then in the next game against Kaiserslautern he also scored the only goal of the match. He scored a total of 10 goal in his first season for the German side. In his second Bundesliga season, "Moa" notched up seven goals in seven games. His consistent performances attracted interest from bigger clubs, most notably Bayern Munich.

In the opening match of the 2011–12 Bundesliga season, he scored a goal against 1899 Hoffenheim at the 30th minute. He scored his first hat-trick in the Hannover jersey versus Werder Bremen on 2 October in a game they won 3–2.

Abdellaoue was troubled with injuries during the 2012–13 Bundesliga season, but managed to score eight goals in the league. He made a total of 80 appearances for Hannover in the Bundesliga, scoring 29 goals.

=== VfB Stuttgart ===
On 11 June 2013, Abdellaoue signed a four-year deal with VfB Stuttgart, and it was reported that the transfer fee was around €4 million. He made his debut for his new team in the qualifying match for the 2013–14 UEFA Europa League against Botev Plovdiv on 1 August 2013 when he came on as a substitute in the 88th minute. Abdellaoue scored his first goal for Stuttgart in the 1–2 loss against Mainz 05 on 25 January 2014, which also was the first match he started for Stuttgart. That goal ended a 274 days goal-drought, as he had not scored a goal in the Bundesliga since 26 April 2013. He was sent to the reserve team and started in the 2–0 win against 1. FSV Mainz 05 II.

=== Vålerenga ===
Abdellaoue signed a contract with his former club Vålerenga on 7 August 2015. In December 2017 he retired from football due to injuries.

== International career ==
Abdellaoue made his debut for the Norway national team on 20 August 2008, in a friendly against Ireland. His first goal came in his seventh match; a UEFA Euro 2012 qualifying match against Iceland. In the friendly match against Northern Ireland on 29 February 2012, Abdellaoue was the captain of Norway in the absence of the regular captain Brede Hangeland. Moa was awarded the Gold Watch after his 25th cap against Albania in March 2013.

== Personal life ==
In 2020 he became an employee—a miljølærer—at a school in Grorud Valley in Oslo. He was raised in the Sinsen neighborhood.

His younger brother striker Mustafa Abdellaoue, known as "Mos", is also a former professional footballer who played as a striker.

== Career statistics ==
=== Club ===
| Club | Season | League | | | Cup | | Europe | | Total | |
| Club | Season | Division | Apps | Goals | Apps | Goals | Apps | Goals | Apps | Goals |
|---|---|---|---|---|---|---|---|---|---|---|
| Skeid | 2003 | 1. divisjon | 6 | 5 | 2 | 0 | — | | 8 | 5 |
| Skeid | 2004 | 1. divisjon | 22 | 11 | 2 | 3 | — | | 24 | 14 |
| Skeid | 2005 | 1. divisjon | 20 | 5 | 0 | 0 | — | | 20 | 5 |
| Skeid | 2006 | 2. divisjon | 18 | 10 | 1 | 1 | — | | 19 | 11 |
| Skeid | 2007 | 1. Divisjon | 20 | 9 | 3 | 2 | — | | 23 | 11 |
| Skeid | Total | | 86 | 40 | 8 | 6 | 0 | 0 | 94 | 46 |
| Vålerenga | 2008 | Tippeligaen | 23 | 9 | 6 | 7 | — | | 29 | 16 |
| Vålerenga | 2009 | Tippeligaen | 24 | 6 | 3 | 3 | 2 | 0 | 29 | 9 |
| Vålerenga | 2010 | Tippeligaen | 20 | 15 | 1 | 1 | — | | 21 | 16 |
| Vålerenga | Total | | 67 | 30 | 10 | 11 | 2 | 0 | 79 | 41 |
| Hannover 96 | 2010–11 | Bundesliga | 26 | 10 | 0 | 0 | — | | 26 | 10 |
| Hannover 96 | 2011–12 | Bundesliga | 28 | 11 | 2 | 2 | 12 | 3 | 42 | 16 |
| Hannover 96 | 2012–13 | Bundesliga | 26 | 8 | 1 | 0 | 8 | 1 | 35 | 9 |
| Hannover 96 | Total | | 80 | 29 | 3 | 2 | 20 | 4 | 103 | 35 |
| VfB Stuttgart | 2013–14 | Bundesliga | 12 | 1 | 2 | 0 | 4 | 0 | 18 | 1 |
| VfB Stuttgart | 2014–15 | Bundesliga | 0 | 0 | 0 | 0 | — | | 0 | 0 |
| VfB Stuttgart | Total | | 12 | 1 | 2 | 0 | 4 | 0 | 18 | 1 |
| Vålerenga | 2015 | Tippeligaen | 4 | 1 | 0 | 0 | — | | 4 | 1 |
| Vålerenga | 2016 | Tippeligaen | 18 | 6 | 1 | 0 | — | | 19 | 6 |
| Vålerenga | 2017 | Tippeligaen | 12 | 2 | 0 | 0 | — | | 12 | 2 |
| Vålerenga | Total | | 34 | 9 | 1 | 0 | 0 | 0 | 35 | 9 |
| Career total | | | 279 | 109 | 24 | 19 | 26 | 4 | 329 | 132 |

=== International ===
Appearances and goals by national team and year
| National team | Year | Apps | Goals |
|---|---|---|---|
| Norway | 2008 | 2 | 0 |
| Norway | 2009 | 2 | 0 |
| Norway | 2010 | 6 | 2 |
| Norway | 2011 | 8 | 3 |
| Norway | 2012 | 6 | 1 |
| Norway | 2013 | 7 | 1 |
| Norway | 2014 | 1 | 0 |
| Norway | 2015 | 1 | 0 |
| Total | | 33 | 7 |

Scores and results list Norway's goal tally first, score column indicates score after each Abdellaoue goal.

List of international goals scored by Mohammed Abdellaoue
| No. | Date | Venue | Opponent | Score | Result | Competition | Ref. |
|---|---|---|---|---|---|---|---|
| 1 | 3 September 2010 | Laugardalsvöllur, Reykjavík, Iceland | Iceland | 2–1 | 2–1 | UEFA Euro 2012 qualifying | |
| 2 | 12 October 2010 | Maksimir Stadium, Zagreb, Croatia | Croatia | 1–0 | 1–2 | Friendly | |
| 3 | 10 August 2011 | Ullevaal Stadion, Oslo, Norway | Czech Republic | 1–0 | 3–0 | Friendly | |
| 4 | 10 August 2011 | Ullevaal Stadion, Oslo, Norway | Czech Republic | 3–0 | 3–0 | Friendly | |
| 5 | 2 September 2011 | Ullevaal Stadion, Oslo, Norway | Iceland | 1–0 | 1–0 | UEFA Euro 2012 qualifying | |
| 6 | 14 November 2012 | Ferenc Puskás Stadium, Budapest, Hungary | Hungary | 2–0 | 2–0 | Friendly | |
| 7 | 14 August 2013 | Friends Arena, Stockholm, Sweden | Sweden | 1–2 | 2–4 | Friendly | |

== Honours ==
Vålerenga

- Norwegian Cup: 2008

Individual

- Kniksen of the Year: 2011
