= Troy Perkins =

American soccer player (born 1981)

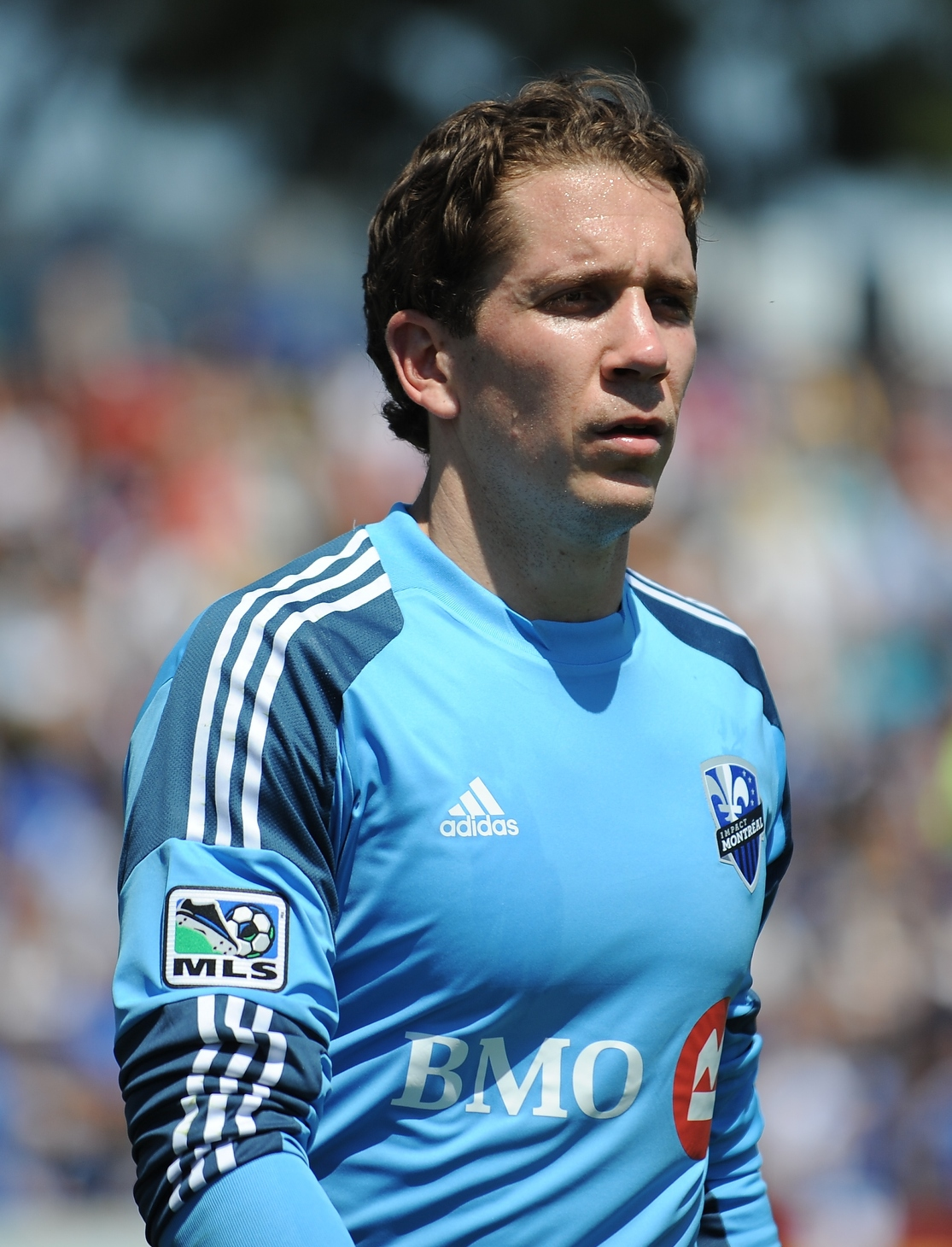
- Perkins with Montreal Impact in 2013

Personal information
- Full name: Troy Perkins
- Date of birth: July 29, 1981 (age 45)
- Place of birth: Springfield, Ohio, United States
- Height: 6 ft 2 in (1.88 m)
- Position: Goalkeeper

College career
Years	Team	Apps	(Gls)
2000–2002	South Florida Bulls	58	(0)
2003	Evansville Purple Aces	19	(0)

Senior career*
Years	Team	Apps	(Gls)
2002	Cape Cod Crusaders	22	(0)
2004–2007	D.C. United	77	(0)
2004	→ Northern Virginia Royals (loan)	2	(0)
2008–2009	Vålerenga	53	(0)
2010	D.C. United	22	(0)
2011–2012	Portland Timbers	51	(0)
2012–2014	Montreal Impact	63	(0)
2015	Seattle Sounders FC	4	(0)
2015	→ Seattle Sounders FC 2 (loan)	1	(0)
Total		295	(0)

International career
2009–2010	United States	7	(0)

Managerial career
- 2016: Seattle Sounders FC 2 (goalkeeping coach)
Medal record
ke
Representing United States
Runner-up	CONCACAF Gold Cup	2009
Men's Soccer
- * Club domestic league appearances and goals

Troy Perkins (born July 29, 1981) is an American former soccer player. During his career, he played for clubs in the United States, Canada, and Norway. The 2006 Major League Soccer Goalkeeper of the Year award winner earned seven caps with the United States national team.

== Career ==
=== College and amateur ===
Perkins is a graduate of Thomas Worthington High School, in Worthington, OH, and played college soccer at the University of South Florida and the University of Evansville. He was named third-team All-Conference USA in 2001, and second-team All-CUSA in 2002. He transferred to Evansville for his senior season. At Evansville, he allowed only twenty-one goals in nineteen matches, compiling a 1.09 goals-against-average. Perkins also played in the PDL for the Cape Cod Crusaders in 2002.

=== Professional ===
Upon graduating in 2003, Perkins went undrafted. However, he was signed to a developmental contract by D.C. United. Not expected to contribute, Perkins was given an opportunity after both Nick Rimando and Doug Warren lost their starting positions. Perkins proved up to the task, and went on to start sixteen games for the team, posting a 1.62 goals against average. Although Perkins was performing well, the team suffered during his tenure, and he was replaced near the end of the season with Nick Rimando, who would also start for United throughout the playoffs.

In early 2005 he trained with Bolton Wanderers F.C., an English Premier League club and in early 2006 he trained with Everton in Liverpool.

During the 2006 season, Perkins was the starting goalkeeper for United, playing thirty of thirty-two games. He was also named 2006 MLS Goalkeeper of the Year, Best XI, and voted to the 2006 All Star Team. Perkins finished the 2007 MLS season with a 1.10 goals against average, eight shutouts, and sixteen wins, the most in the league.

On December 20, 2007, Perkins signed a five-year contract with Vålerenga, making him the first American to sign for the Norwegian club.

On January 13, 2010, returned to D.C. United in a complicated pre-draft trade deal in which United traded midfielder Fred, its first-round 2010 MLS SuperDraft pick, its #6 spot in the MLS allocation order, and allocation money to Philadelphia Union in exchange for the Union's #1 spot in the allocation order. D.C. then used the #1 allocation ranking to re-acquire Perkins. Attempts were made to sign him by Feyenoord and several French clubs, but nothing materialized and he returned to D.C. United.

On December 17, 2010, Perkins was traded to Portland Timbers for goalkeeper Steve Cronin and allocation money. Perkins went into camp as the Timbers' first choice goalkeeper, but he missed the first six Timbers games after a knee injury Perkins suffered in training. Despite the injury, Perkins notched the Timbers' first-ever league shutout with their 1–0 victory over Real Salt Lake on April 30, 2011.

Perkins signed a new contract with Portland on November 28, 2011.

Perkins began the 2012 season with the Timbers, however, on August 7, 2012, Perkins was traded to Montreal Impact for veteran Jamaican goaltender Donovan Ricketts. Perkins stayed with Montreal through the 2014 season.

On January 13, 2015, Perkins signed with Seattle Sounders FC.

On January 11, 2016, Perkins announced his retirement and joined the Seattle Sounders FC Academy as a staff member.

=== International ===
Perkins has also played for the United States National Team, receiving his first cap against Sweden on January 21, 2009.

== Personal life ==
While being a backup goalkeeper for D.C. United, Perkins also had a second job working at a sporting goods store in Fair Lakes, VA called Galyans (which is currently known as Dick's Sporting Goods). Beginning in 2006, Perkins worked a second job as a mortgage loan processor, leading United fans to put up a banner that said, "Troy Saves – and Loans."

Perkins has revealed that his return to MLS in 2010 was because his wife was unable to settle in Norway.

Perkins considers that his training as a mortgage loan processor is important and has stated, "Goalies can usually play until they're around 40, so you have to think about a job after retirement," He has an "austere pregame routine, which entails shutting off all electronics and not talking to anyone for 24 hours. 'I'm a miserable person to be around,' he says, laughing. 'My wife hates it.'"

After retiring from professional soccer and leaving the Sounders organization, Perkins was sworn in as a police officer in Kennewick, Washington in January 2017.

== Honors ==
=== D.C. United ===
- Major League Soccer Supporter's Shield (2): 2006, 2007
- Major League Soccer MLS Cup (1): 2004

=== Vålerenga ===
- Norwegian Cup Champion(1): 2008

=== Montreal Impact ===
- Canadian Championship (2): 2013, 2014

=== Individual ===
- MLS Goalkeeper of the Year: 2006
- MLS Best XI: 2006
