= Daniel Nannskog =

Swedish footballer (born 1974)

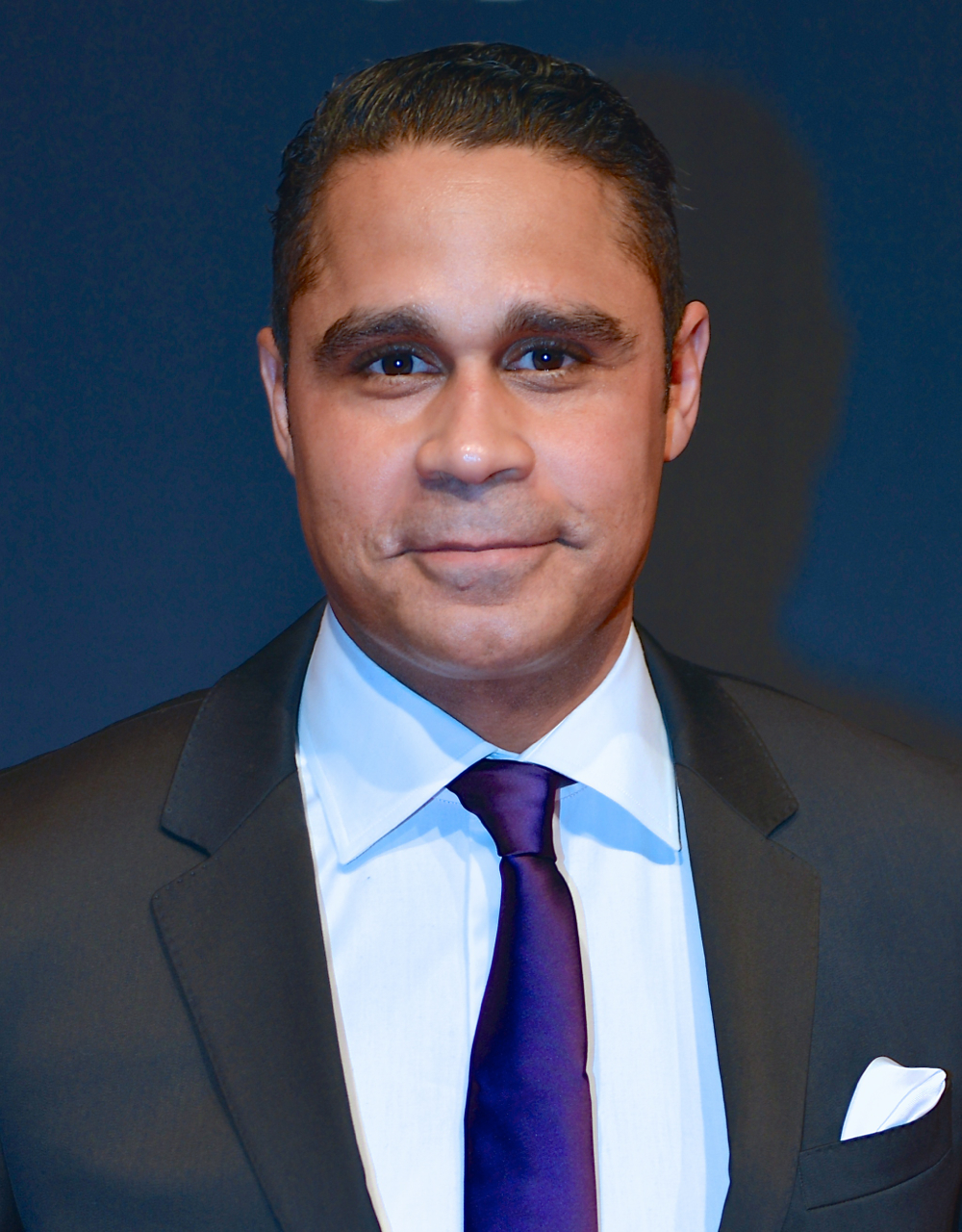
- Nannskog at the Swedish Sports Awards in 2014

Personal information
- Full name: Daniel Paul Gustav Nannskog
- Date of birth: 22 May 1974 (age 52)
- Place of birth: Helsingborg, Sweden
- Height: 1.80 m (5 ft 11 in)
- Position: Striker

Senior career*
Years	Team	Apps	(Gls)
1993–1995	Högaborg	31	(13)
1996	Malmö FF	10	(1)
1997–1998	Djurgården	44	(18)
1999	Assyriska	26	(7)
2000	Sylvia	29	(9)
2001–2003	Landskrona BoIS	69	(36)
2003–2004	Sichuan Guancheng	36	(17)
2005–2010	Stabæk	147	(101)
Total		392	(202)

International career
2007–2009	Sweden	7	(2)

Managerial career
- 2015–2016: FC Stockholm Internazionale
- * Club domestic league appearances and goals

Daniel Paul Gustav Nannskog (born 22 May 1974) is a Swedish former professional footballer who played as a striker. During a club career that spanned between 1994 and 2010, he represented Högaborg, Malmö FF, Djurgården, Assyriska, Sylvia, Landskrona BoIS, Sichuan Guancheng and Stabæk IF. A full international between 2007 and 2009, he won seven caps and scored two goals for the Sweden national team.

Nannskog is currently a football pundit on Swedish TV channel SVT.

== Club career ==
=== Sweden ===
Nannskog started up at Högaborg, a small football club from his home city Helsingborg in Scania, the southernmost county of Sweden, as a young boy. However, from the age 15 he quit football to concentrate on handball. After some persuasion, he started to play football again at the age of 19. After his comeback, he played two seasons for Högaborg, before switching to Allsvenskan side Malmö FF. His time at the club was not particularly successful, but a goal he scored for them was very important as it sent Malmö to the UEFA Cup. The next seasons were spent in Swedish second tier, the Superettan.

When he was 27, he was brought to Landskrona BoIS, by coach Janne Jönsson. His first season there they reached second place and got promoted, with Nannskog as the league's top scorer with 21 goals. He followed Landskrona up to Allsvenskan and did very well, becoming the club's top scorer with 11 goals, playing an important part in them finishing just above relegation play-off. In the middle of the Swedish 2003 season, he moved on to China.

Nannskog played for Swedish Landskrona BoIS from 2001 when the club played in second tier Superettan. He was involved in the promotion of Landskrona BoIS to Swedish top tier league, Allsvenskan. And his success continued during the following year. Already in the first match, Nannskog scored a goal as Landskrona BoIS in a remarkable match defeated their old rivals Helsingborgs IF as Landskrona BoIS won 6–2 in front of an attendance of 12.000 at Landskrona IP. Together with BoIS' other forward, Danijel Milovanović, both of them became a feared top-duo that led their recently promoted club to the top position of Allsvenskan at the break for the World Cup in Japan and South Korea. After the eight first matches, Landskrona BoIS had won five matches, drawn three times and never lost. When forward colleague Milovanović got seriously injured against rivals Malmö FF (an injury from which Milovanović never recovered), this surprising success ended for Nannskog's club, but Nannskog himself continued to score.

=== Sichuan Guancheng ===
Nannskog left Landskrona BoIS in summer of 2003 to join the Chinese club Sichuan Guancheng on a two-year deal. He went on to stay for a year-and a half, but terminated his contract in order to play for his old coach Janne Jönsson at Stabæk in the 2005 season.

=== Stabæk ===
==== 2005–2007 ====
His first season at Stabæk was very successful, with his club being promoted in style. "The Body" Nannskog was also named top scorer with 27 goals in 29 games.

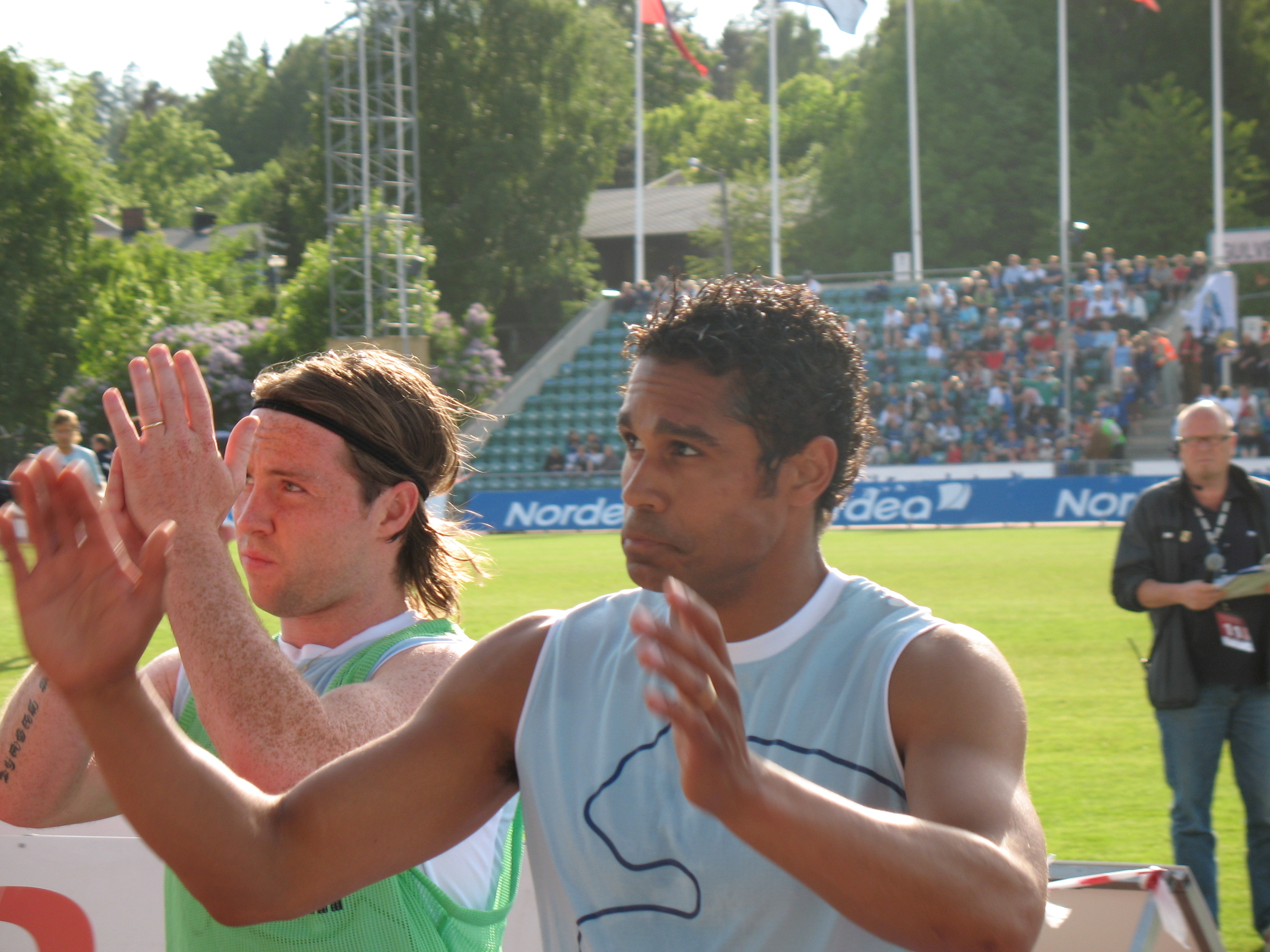
Nannskog and fellow striker Veigar Páll Gunnarsson applauding the fans after a match against Vålerenga in June 2006.

Nannskogs debut in the Norwegian top division was successful. They finished fifth, just outside an UEFA Cup spot. Nannskog was crowned top scorer with his 19 goals, one goal ahead of team-mate Veigar Páll Gunnarsson. Nannskog and Stabæk continued their progress, and for a second time in a row, he managed to score 19 goals, but this time finishing behind Brann's Thorstein Helstad, who scored 22. However, Stabæk did better in the league, finishing second behind Brann. They were in front half way, but did not have the edge in the second part of the season.

==== 2008–2010 ====
Stabæk have played well in the first part of the 2008 season with Nannskog an integral part, like when he scored two goals in the away match against Ham-Kam (2–0 victory) in round 5. The Norwegian media felt it was time the Sweden national team took a look at him again with a possible inclusion in the Euro 2008 squad, following his winning goal against Rosenborg on 4 May. However, he did not make the squad. On 14 September Nannskog scored four goals in a 6–0 victory over Strømsgodset, taking him to the top of the goal scoring chart with 13 goals – helping Stabæk with a six-point advantage with six rounds to go. On 24 September, Nannskog scored two goals and made one assist in the semifinal of the Norwegian Cup, helping Stabæk to a 3–0 victory over Molde. A few days later, on 29 September Nannskog scored his 99th and 100th goal against Molde. This time in a league match.

Stabæk won the league in stylish fashion. Nannskog was crowned top scorer of the league with his 16 goals, four more than fellow team-mate and Swede Johan Andersson. He was denied 'the double' as they lost in the Norwegian Cup final against Vålerenga.

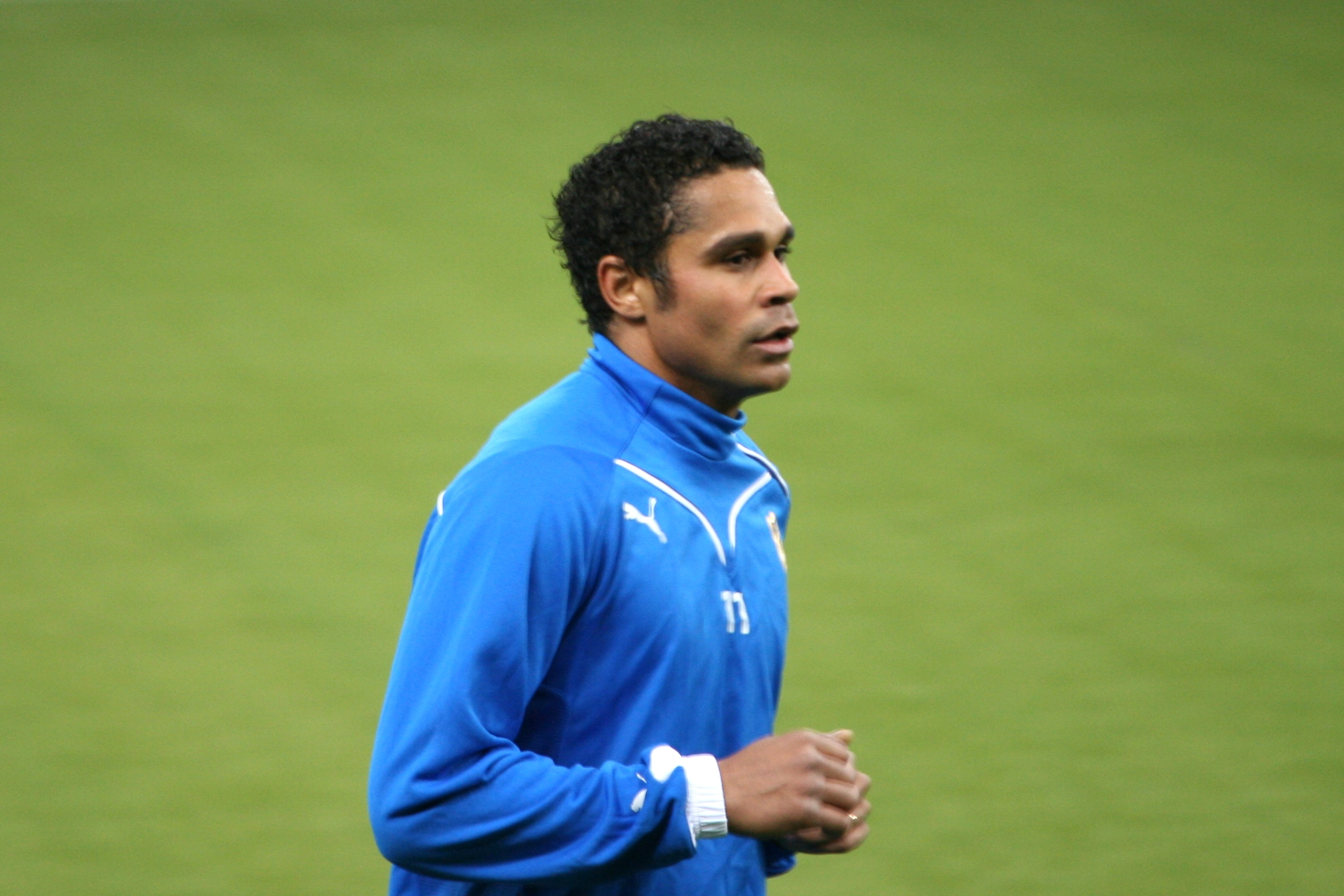
Nannskog during a training session with Stabæk in February 2009.

On 8 March Stabæk claimed their first trophy of the season when they won the Norwegian Superfinal against last season's cup winners Vålerenga by 3 goals to 1 with Nannskog scoring the opener.

Nannskog scored a hat-trick on 5 April as Stabæk turned 1–3 to a 3–3 draw in the third league round. Nannskog was injured for just over a month before making a comeback on 24 May, scoring a brace in a 3–0 victory over Start in the Tippeligaen. He soon got injured again and so far only restricted him to 11 league games this season (5 goals).

In total, Nannskog scored 123 goals in 172 games for Stabæk in all competitions.

Nannskog failed to return from his injuries and subsequently retired from football.

== International career ==
Nannskog's debut for the Sweden national team came 14 January 2007 against Venezuela. His first goal for his national team came against Ecuador on 21 January 2007, in a game which ended 1–1. In January 2009 Nannskog was called up to the Swedish squad to face the United States and Mexico during their annual North-American tour. On 25 January 2009, Nannskog scored his second goal for Sweden in a 3–2 loss against the United States.

== Personal life ==
Nannskog was born in Helsingborg, Sweden to a Swedish mother and an Afro American father (now living in the U.S.), who worked as a basketball coach, jazz singer and ship builder. Nannskog had one brother, who is now deceased, and two sisters.

== Media career ==
Nannskog went on to work at Norwegian television channel TV2 following his retirement, but has since made the move to a similar role at the Swedish national public TV broadcaster SVT.

== Career statistics ==
=== International ===
Appearances and goals by national team and year
National team	Year	Apps	Goals
Sweden	2007	3	1
Sweden	2008	0	0
Sweden	2009	4	1
Total		7	2

Scores and results list Sweden goal tally first, score column indicates score after each Nannskog goal.

List of international goals scored by Daniel Nannskog
No.	Date	Venue	Cap	Opponent	Score	Result	Competition
1	21 January 2007	Estadio Olímpico Atahualpa, Quito, Ecuador	3	Ecuador	1–0	1–1	Friendly
2	24 January 2009	Home Depot Center, Carson, California, United States	4	United States	1–2	2–3	Friendly

== Honours ==
Stabæk

- Tippeligaen: 2008
- 1. divisjon: 2005

Individual

- Superettan top scorer: 2001
- Chinese FA Cup top scorer: 2004
- 1. divisjon top scorer: 2005
- Tippeligaen top scorer: 2006, 2008
- Kniksen award Attacker of the Year: 2008
