= Norsk Toppfotball =

Norwegian advocacy group for men's association football

- Founded: 1972
- Headquarters: Oslo, Norway
- Location: Norway
- Members: 32
- Key people: Cato Haug, Chairman; Jens Haugland, CEO
- Website: toppfotball.no

Norsk Toppfotball (NTF) is an interest organization for the 16 Norwegian Premier League and 16 Norwegian First Division clubs in Norway. The organization was previously known as Serieforeningen av 1972 (SF-72), but changed its name in 2001. NTF goal is to be a leading factor in the development of Norwegian top football on a club level. They support clubs economically, administrative and commercially to help raise the level of Norwegian football. NTF, together with TV 2 and the coaches union, choose the coach of the month/year, and together with TV 2 and the readers of fxt.no choose the player of the month/year.
