= Øyvind Bolthof =

Norwegian footballer (born 1977)

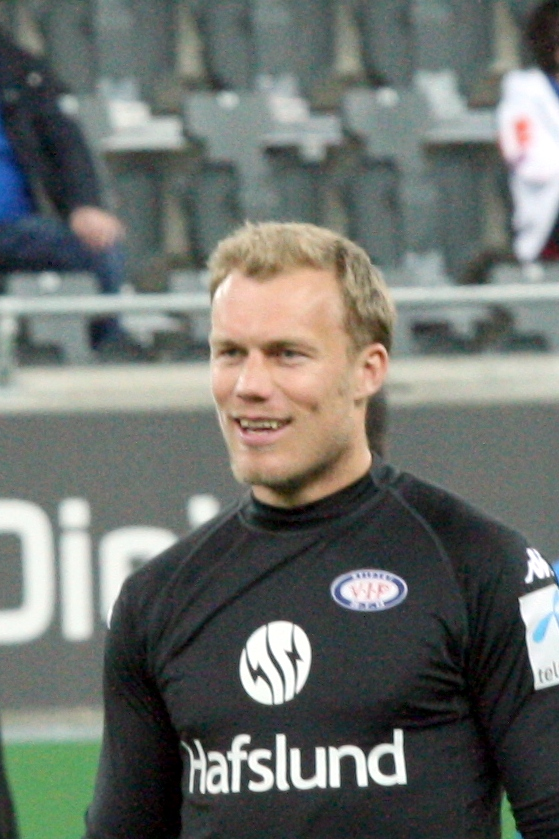

Personal information
- Full name: Øyvind André Bolthof
- Date of birth: March 30, 1977 (age 49)
- Place of birth: Oslo, Norway
- Height: 1.88 m (6 ft 2 in)
- Position: Goalkeeper

Youth career
- Bøler IF
- Lyn
- Bækkelagets SK
- Årvoll

Senior career*
Years	Team	Apps	(Gls)
- Årvoll
1995–2010	Vålerenga	92	(0)
- * Club domestic league appearances and goals as of 11 January 2008

Øyvind Bolthof (born March 30, 1977) is a Norwegian football goalkeeper.

His earlier clubs are Lyn, Bøler IF, Bækkelagets SK and Årvoll IL, but he joined Vålerenga already in 1995. After the arrival of Árni Gautur Arason to Vålerenga in 2004, Bolthof has been the second choice keeper and has played mainly on the reserves team.

Parallel to his football career, Bolthof has taken the siviløkonom degree at BI Norwegian Business School.

== Honours ==
- Norwegian Premier League:
  - Winner (1): 2005
- Norwegian Football Cup:
  - Winner (3): 1997, 2002, 2008
