= Jan Jönsson =

Swedish footballer and manager

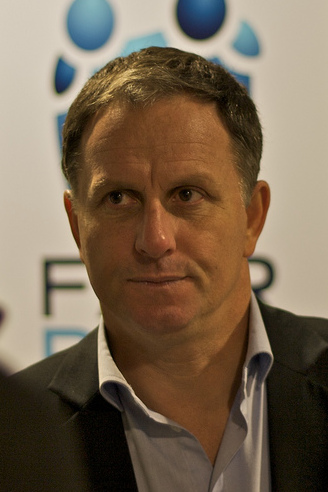

Personal information
- Full name: Jan Anders Jönsson
- Date of birth: 24 May 1960 (age 66)
- Place of birth: Sweden
- Height: 1.77 m (5 ft 10 in)
- Position: Midfielder

Senior career*
Years	Team	Apps	(Gls)
1978–1992	Halmstad	557	(?)
1993	Sanfrecce Hiroshima	6	(1)
1995–1996	Vissel Kobe	30	(7)

Managerial career
- 1993–1994: Sanfrecce Hiroshima (assistant)
- 1995–1997: Vissel Kobe (assistant)
- 1998–2000: Ljungskile
- 2001–2004: Landskrona
- 2005–2010: Stabæk
- 2011–2012: Rosenborg
- 2013–2014: Aalesund
- 2015–2017: Halmstad
- 2017: Sanfrecce Hiroshima
- 2018–2019: Shimizu S-Pulse
- 2019–2021: Stabæk
- 2024–: Stabæk Kvinner
- * Club domestic league appearances and goals

Jan Jönsson (born 24 May 1960) is a Swedish football manager and former player.

== Career ==
=== Playing career ===
He spent most of his playing career with Halmstads BK.

=== Coaching career ===
Between 1993 and 1994 he was the Sanfrecce Hiroshima assistant coach with Stuart Baxter as manager.

After retiring, he was appointed manager for Landskrona, which he took to Allsvenskan, the Swedish top flight. In 2005, he took over Norwegian club Stabæk and led them to promotion in his first season. He won the league with Stabæk in 2008. On 19 November 2014 it was announced that Jan was moving home to Halmstad and had signed a 3-year contract as head coach of HBK. His first season in charge ended with relegation from Allsvenskan. The following season Halmstad finished third in Superettan and faced Helsingborg in a two-legged play-off, which Halmstad won 3–2 on aggregate.

In June 2019, he returned to Stabæk for his second spell as head coach at the club. A main reason was his daughter Zara signing for Stabæk's women's team. On 25 October 2019, Stabæk announced that their contract with Jönsson had been extended till the end of the 2022 season. On 4 July 2021, Jönsson's contract with Stabæk was terminated by mutual consent.

== Club statistics ==
Appearances and goals by club, season and competition
Club	Season	League			Emperor's Cup		J.League Cup		Total	
Club	Season	Division	Apps	Goals	Apps	Goals	Apps	Goals	Apps	Goals
Sanfrecce Hiroshima	1993	J1 League	6	1	0	0	0	0	6	1
Vissel Kobe	1995	Football League	15	6	3	0	—		18	6
Vissel Kobe	1996	Football League	15	1	0	0	—		15	1
Career total			36	8	3	0	0	0	39	8

== Managerial honours ==
=== Club ===
Sanfrecce Hiroshima

- J1 League: 1st Stage Champions 1994

Landskrona BoIS

- Superettan: Runners-up 2001

Stabæk Fotball

- Tippeligaen: 2008
- 1. divisjon: 2005

Halmstads BK

- Allsvenskan play-offs: Winner 2016

=== Individual ===
- Norwegian Football Manager of the Month: July 2006
