= Olsvik IL =

Norwegian football club

Home colours

Olsvik Idrettslag (also known as Olsvik IL) is a Norwegian football club, whose most famous member is the international referee Terje Hauge. The club was founded in 2000 and had their 10-year celebration in 2010 with a match against their corporation club Flaktveit IL (Åsane)
