= Martin Andresen =

Norwegian footballer (born 1977)

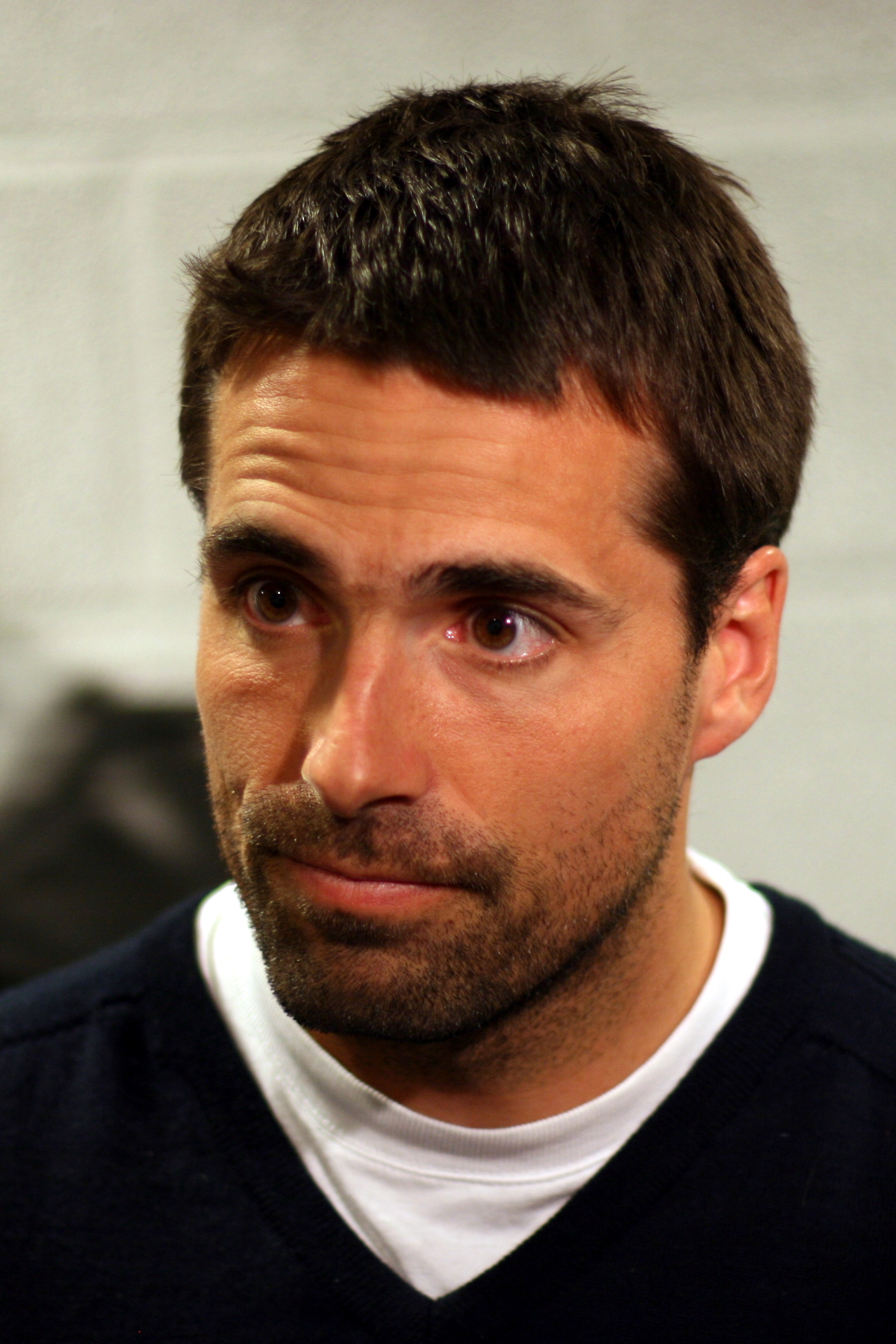

Personal information
- Date of birth: 2 February 1977 (age 49)
- Place of birth: Kråkstad, Norway
- Height: 1.80 m (5 ft 11 in)
- Position: Central midfielder

Youth career
- Kråkstad
- Ski

Senior career*
Years	Team	Apps	(Gls)
1995–1997	Moss	45	(10)
1997	Viking	26	(8)
1998–1999	Stabæk	47	(16)
1999–2000	Wimbledon	13	(1)
2000	→ Molde (loan)	9	(1)
2001–2004	Stabæk	87	(16)
2003–2004	→ Blackburn (loan)	11	(0)
2005–2007	Brann	64	(11)
2008–2010	Vålerenga	40	(2)
2011–2012	Follo	8	(0)
2013	Stabæk	1	(0)
2015	Sandefjord	3	(0)
Total		355	(65)

International career
1995–1998	Norway U21	24	(4)
2001–2009	Norway	43	(3)

Managerial career
- 2008–2012: Vålerenga
- * Club domestic league appearances and goals

Martin Andresen (born 2 February 1977) is a Norwegian former professional football player and manager, who played as a central midfielder. Martin is also keen bridge player winning both a North American and European championship.

== Club career ==
=== Early career ===
Andresen was born in Kråkstad. He was a regular on many Norway national youth teams while playing for Moss, Viking and Stabæk Fotball from 1995 to 1999.

After the 1999 season, Andresen was sold to Premier League club Wimbledon in a deal worth £1 million. But like many of the other Norwegians in the club, his stay became short and unsuccessful. He scored once for Wimbledon; in a 2–1 loss to Liverpool. He had a short loan spell at Molde.

=== Return to Stabæk ===
Andresen returned to Stabæk in 2001, where he proved himself to be one of the best central midfielders in Norway.

After a successful 2003 season, where Stabæk captured the bronze medals in the Norwegian Premier League, Andresen was loaned out to the Premiership club Blackburn Rovers for six months in 2004, from February to August, but did not sign a longer deal with the English club. Andresen return to Stabæk to save the club from relegation from the Norwegian Premier League. Andresen played while injured and Stabæk could not save their top spot in league Norway. Andresen, not willing to play in the Adeccoliga, asked to be sold. Many clubs in Norway were interested in the national team captain; the high price scared many away, including the champions Rosenborg. Vålerenga looked set to capture Andresen at Christmas 2004. Brann was helped by local investors to sign him on 23 December 2004.

=== Brann ===
Andresen became the most expensive transfer in Brann history, in a deal worth ca. 15.000.000 NOK (£1.310.000). After a disappointing first season, much ruined by injuries, Andresen made it clear that he would be "fit for fight" in 2006. In the pre-season he was appointed captain for Brann, clearly showing his importance for the club on and off the field. In 2006, Brann had their best season opening ever, with Andresen filling the captain role. He also periodically captained team Norway, playing in central midfield. In 2007 Brann won the Norwegian League, with Andresen as captain. He was described as the most valuable player by many Norwegian pundits. He was also named in the Team of the Year.

=== Vålerenga ===
Andresen was announced as the new manager of Vålerenga on 6 November 2007 while still under contract with Brann for the remainder of the year. Brann terminated their working relationship with Andresen the day after. He signed a three-year-long contract with Vålerenga as player and manager. Andresen became the first player/head coach in Norway's top division (Tippeligaen) since Kjetil Rekdal (also with Vålerenga) in 2002.

He retired as a player before the 2010 season, but continued to play several matches for the reserve team in the Norwegian Second Division. In 2011, he played for Follo FK who were in the same division, making eight appearances for the club.

On 15 October 2012, Andresen was dismissed as manager for Vålerenga.

=== Second return to Stabæk ===
Andresen came out of retirement and joined Stabæk, who had been relegated from Tippeligaen, ahead of the 2013 season.

=== Sandefjord ===
Andresen came out for retirement for a second time on 18 August 2015, and joined Sandefjord Fotball for the remainder of the 2015 Tippeligaen season.

== International football career ==
Andresen made his debut for Norway national team in a 15 August 2001 friendly match against Turkey and earned a total of 43 caps, scoring three goals.

== Bridge accomplishments ==
=== Wins ===
- North American Bridge Championships (1)
  - Nail Life Master Open Pairs (1) 2009
- European Bridge League Championships (1)
  - Champions' Cup (1) 2021

== Personal life ==
Martin Andresen is an heir to the Norwegian furniture manufacturer Skeidar.

== Career football statistics ==
As of 18 August 2015

Appearances and goals by club, season and competition
Season	Club	League			Cup		Total	
Season	Club	Division	Apps	Goals	Apps	Goals	Apps	Goals
Moss	1995	1. divisjon	21	4			21	4
Moss	1996	Tippeligaen	24	6			24	6
Moss	Total		45	10			45	10
Viking	1997	Tippeligaen	26	8			26	8
Stabæk	1998	Tippeligaen	25	8			25	8
Stabæk	1999	Tippeligaen	22	8			22	8
Stabæk	Total		47	16			47	16
Wimbledon	1999–2000	Premier League	14	1	2	0	15	1
Molde	2000	Tippeligaen	9	1	0	0	9	1
Stabæk	2001	Tippeligaen	24	6	3	1	27	7
Stabæk	2002	Tippeligaen	25	1	5	1	30	2
Stabæk	2003	Tippeligaen	25	8	4	1	29	9
Stabæk	Total		74	15	12	3	86	18
Blackburn	2003–04	Premier League	11	0	0	0	11	0
Stabæk	2004	Tippeligaen	13	1	2	0	15	1
Brann	2005	Tippeligaen	17	2	1	0	18	2
Brann	2006	Tippeligaen	24	3	2	0	26	3
Brann	2007	Tippeligaen	23	6	1	0	24	6
Brann	Total		64	11	4	0	68	11
Vålerenga	2008	Tippeligaen	23	1	5	0	28	1
Vålerenga	2009	Tippeligaen	17	1	5	0	22	1
Vålerenga	2010	Tippeligaen	0	0	0	0	0	0
Vålerenga	Total		40	2	10	0	50	2
Follo	2011	2. divisjon	5	0	0	0	5	0
Follo	2012	2. divisjon	3	0	0	0	3	0
Follo	Total		8	0	0	0	8	0
Stabæk	2013	1. divisjon	1	0	0	0	1	0
Sandefjord	2015	Tippeligaen	3	0	0	0	3	0
Career total			353	65	30	3	383	68

== Honours ==
Stabæk

- Norwegian Cup: 1998

Brann

- Norwegian Premier League: 2007

Vålerenga

- Norwegian Cup: 2008

Individual

- Kniksen of the year: 2003
- Kniksen award: midfielder of the year in 2003
- Norwegian Football Association Gold Watch
