= 2005 Norwegian First Division =

1. divisjon
- Season: 2005
- Dates: 10 April – 30 October
- Champions: Stabæk
- Promoted: Stabæk; Sandefjord
- Relegated: Mandalskameratene; Skeid; Tønsberg; Alta
- Matches played: 240
- Goals scored: 731 (3.05 per match)
- Top goalscorer: Daniel Nannskog (27 goals)
- Biggest home win: Stabæk 8–1 Pors Grenland (30 October 2005)
- Biggest away win: Alta 0–5 Løv-Ham (30 October 2005)
- Highest scoring: Tønsberg 3–6 Pors Grenland (13 August 2005)

The 2005 1. divisjon (referred to as Adeccoligaen for sponsorship reasons) was a Norwegian second-tier football season. The season kicked off on 10 April 2005, and the final round was played on 30 October 2005.

Stabæk were promoted to the 2006 Tippeligaen as First Division winners, along with Sandefjord who finished second. Sandefjord will be playing in the top division for the first time while Stabæk return to Tippeligaen after being relegated in 2004.

As in previous years, there was a two-legged promotion playoff at the end of the season, between the third-placed team in the 1. divisjon (Moss) and the twelfth-placed team in the Tippeligaen (Molde). Molde kept their spot in the Tippeligaen, after beating Moss 5–2 on aggregate.

Mandalskameratene, Skeid, Tønsberg and Alta were relegated to the 2006 2. divisjon at the end of the season.

== Team changes from 2004 ==
2004 1. divisjon champions Start and runners-up Aalesund were promoted to the 2005 Tippeligaen. They were replaced by Stabæk and Sogndal, who finished 13th and 14th respectively in the 2004 Tippeligaen season.

Four teams, Raufoss, Haugesund, Vard Haugesund and Tromsdalen, were relegated to the 2005 2. divisjon following the 2004 season. They were replaced by 2004 2. divisjon winners Tønsberg, Follo, Løv-Ham and Alta.

== League table ==
Pos	Team	Pld	W	D	L	GF	GA	GD	Pts	Promotion or relegation
1	Stabæk (C, P)	30	20	7	3	63	23	+40	67	Promotion to Tippeligaen
2	Sandefjord (P)	30	19	5	6	58	37	+21	62	Promotion to Tippeligaen
3	Moss	30	17	7	6	54	30	+24	58	Qualification for the promotion play-offs
4	Hønefoss BK	30	17	5	8	52	41	+11	56	
5	Bryne	30	14	8	8	55	33	+22	50	
6	Pors Grenland	30	13	11	6	47	45	+2	50	
7	Sogndal	30	11	8	11	47	51	−4	41	
8	Strømsgodset	30	11	7	12	46	45	+1	40	
9	Hødd	30	10	7	13	53	54	−1	37	
10	Kongsvinger	30	11	4	15	41	48	−7	37	
11	Follo	30	8	10	12	40	47	−7	34	
12	Løv-Ham	30	9	4	17	31	47	−16	31	
13	Mandalskameratene (R)	30	7	8	15	41	54	−13	29	Relegation to Second Division
14	Skeid (R)	30	8	5	17	39	58	−19	29	Relegation to Second Division
15	Tønsberg (R)	30	6	7	17	36	56	−20	25	Relegation to Second Division
16	Alta (R)	30	5	5	20	28	62	−34	20	Relegation to Second Division

Source: nifs.no
Rules for classification: 1) points; 2) goal difference; 3) number of goals scored.
(C) Champions; (P) Promoted; (R) Relegated

== Results ==
Home \ Away	ALT	BRY	FOL	ILH	HBK	KIL	LØV	MAN	MOS	PRS	SAN	SKD	SDL	STB	SIF	TØN
Alta	—	0–3	0–2	3–1	0–4	0–3	0–5	3–0	1–2	3–3	2–3	2–0	0–1	0–1	1–4	1–2
Bryne	3–1	—	1–1	0–1	2–2	3–1	4–0	3–1	0–2	3–0	1–3	5–1	5–0	0–1	2–1	2–0
Follo	0–1	4–0	—	1–1	0–0	0–3	1–0	0–3	2–1	1–1	2–1	1–2	1–2	2–4	1–4	1–0
Hødd	3–0	1–1	1–4	—	0–3	4–3	4–2	0–1	1–1	2–3	5–1	3–0	4–1	0–2	4–4	0–1
Hønefoss	1–1	1–0	2–1	2–1	—	2–1	1–2	2–1	0–1	3–1	0–4	3–2	2–1	0–2	2–1	0–1
Kongsvinger	2–1	0–2	2–1	2–0	0–3	—	2–1	2–1	0–2	1–1	1–3	2–2	3–0	1–1	0–1	2–0
Løv-Ham	4–0	2–0	1–0	0–2	0–3	1–0	—	1–1	1–1	0–2	1–1	0–3	1–0	1–2	0–1	3–1
Mandalskameratene	3–0	1–1	1–1	2–2	2–2	3–0	0–2	—	1–3	1–1	1–2	0–0	4–4	0–2	3–0	3–1
Moss	1–0	1–1	4–2	2–1	1–2	2–1	0–0	4–1	—	1–2	3–4	5–1	2–2	0–0	1–1	3–1
Pors Grenland	2–2	1–1	1–1	0–1	2–4	2–0	1–0	4–3	1–0	—	1–1	4–1	0–0	0–0	2–0	2–1
Sandefjord	2–0	1–2	4–1	2–1	3–0	1–0	4–1	2–1	0–2	1–2	—	1–0	0–0	2–1	2–1	1–1
Skeid	0–0	0–0	1–1	2–5	3–4	2–3	3–1	3–1	1–2	0–1	1–2	—	1–3	1–0	0–1	4–0
Sogndal	1–2	0–4	1–1	2–2	4–2	3–1	4–0	3–0	1–0	3–0	0–2	3–1	—	1–1	2–2	2–0
Stabæk	2–1	2–2	1–1	4–1	3–0	4–1	1–0	2–1	0–1	8–1	3–1	4–0	4–2	—	3–1	1–1
Strømsgodset	3–2	2–1	2–4	4–1	0–1	1–1	1–0	4–0	1–3	0–0	1–1	0–2	2–0	1–3	—	0–1
Tønsberg	1–1	2–3	2–2	1–1	1–1	1–3	4–1	0–1	1–3	3–6	2–3	1–2	4–1	0–1	2–2	—

Source: NIFS (in Norwegian)
Legend: Blue = home team win; Yellow = draw; Red = away team win.

== Top goalscorers ==
Rank	Scorer	Club	Goals
1	(Sweden) Daniel Nannskog	Stabæk	27
2	(Sweden) Andreas Tegström	Sandefjord	14
3	(Iceland) Veigar Páll Gunnarsson	Stabæk	13
4	(Kenya) Paul Oyuga	Bryne	12
4	(Norway) Einar Kalsæg	Kongsvinger	12
6	(Norway) Espen Hægeland	Bryne	11
6	(Norway) John Erling Kleppe	Pors Grenland	11
6	(Norway) Steffen Nystrøm	Moss	11
6	(Norway) Andreas Strand	Follo	11
6	(Norway) Thomas Sørum	Strømsgodset	11
