= Stabæk Fotball =

Norwegian association football club

Stabæk
- Full name: Stabæk Fotball
- Nicknames: De Blaa (The Blues)
- Founded: 16 March 1912; 114 years ago
- Ground: Nye Nadderud Stadion
- Capacity: 8,001
- Chairman: Espen Moe
- Head coach: Kjell André Thu
- League: Norwegian First Division
- 2026: 1. divisjon, 4th of 16
- Website: www.stabak.no
Home colours	Away colours

Stabæk Fotball is a Norwegian professional football club based in Bærum, a suburb of Oslo. It is part of the multi-sport organization Stabæk IF. Founded in 1912, the club's name is an archaic spelling of the suburban area Stabekk, from which it once originated. The club currently competes in the Norwegian first division, the second tier of Football in Norway. As of May 2026 their home stadium is Nye Nadderud Stadion. Their current chairman is Jonas Benkow. Kjell André Thu is the current head coach of the club since taking over in December 2025.

== History ==
After years of lean seasons, they won their first title in 1998 as they emerged victorious in the Norwegian Cup, beating Rosenborg BK 3–1 in the final. After having been relegated to 1. divisjon after a poor 2004 season, they experienced a successful period under new manager Jan Jönsson, during which they returned to the league in 2005, won the 2008 Tippeligaen, their first, and reached the final of the Norwegian Cup, culminating in a very successful 2008 season for the club. Stabæk subsequently won the 2009 Norwegian Super Cup but finished a disappointing 12th and 10th place in the 2010 and 2011 league seasons, respectively, thus narrowly avoiding relegation both times.

Stabæk holds longstanding rivalries with Bærum SK, FK Lyn and Vålerenga, both in the league and by geographical location. The team's home colors, entirely blue, have earned them the nickname “De Blaa” (The Blue Ones). In 2009, Stabæk became the first Norwegian association football club with both their men's and women's teams in the premier divisions. Lillestrøm followed suit the next year.

On 30 November 2015, Billy McKinlay was appointed as manager of the club on a two-year contract. McKinlay resigned as manager on 8 July 2016, after being knocked out of the UEFA Europa League by Welsh club Connah's Quay Nomads.

In the 2021 Eliteserien season, Stabæk finished in 15th place, resulting in relegation to the Norwegian First Division for the first time since 2012.

== Stadium ==
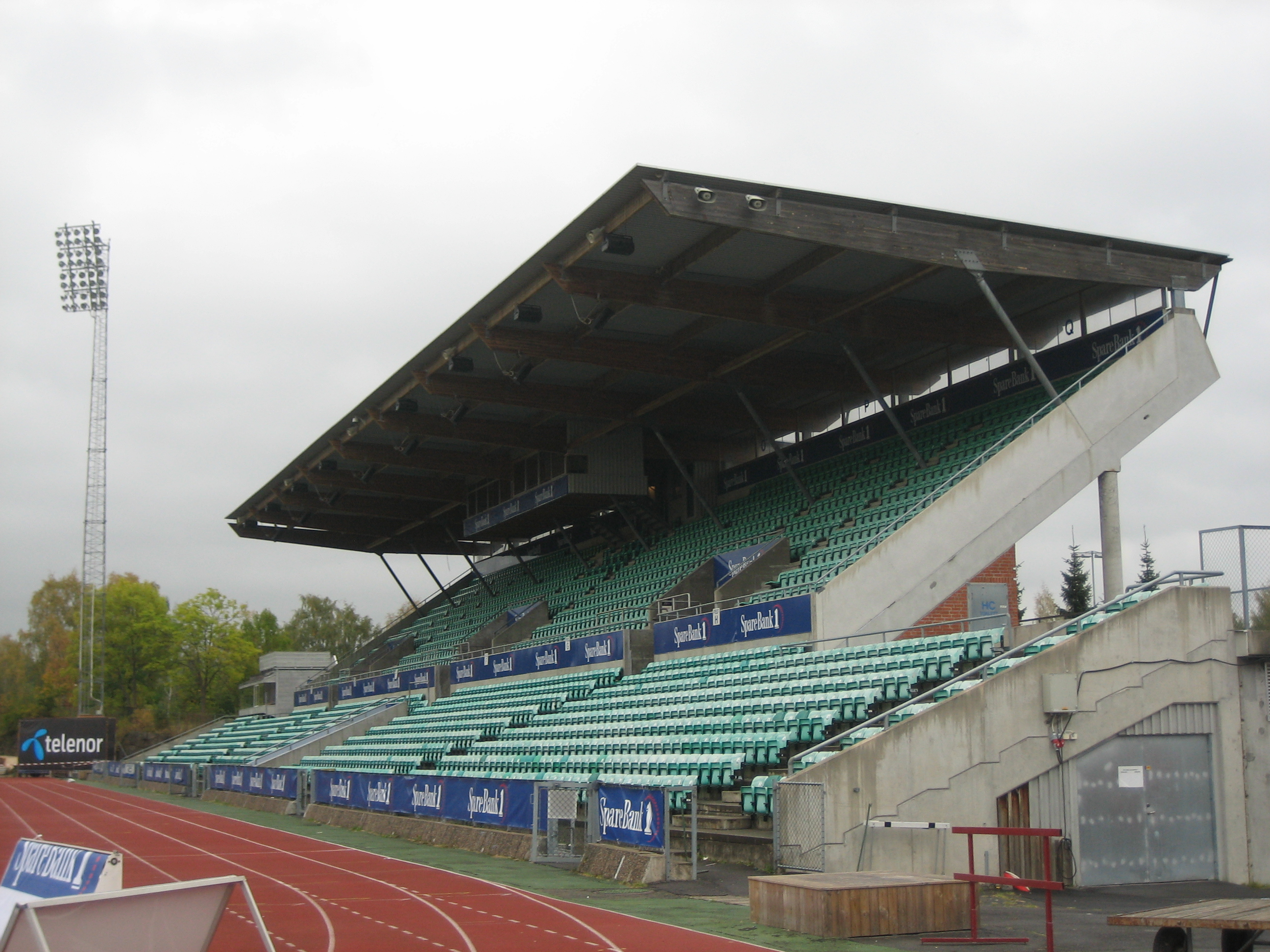
Nadderud Stadion

Stabæk played home games at the Nadderud Stadion until 2008. They then moved into the Telenor Arena, which had a capacity of 15,000 people. Their stay at the Telenor Arena became shorter than desired; after a three-year-long stay at the indoor arena, they moved back to the Nadderud Stadion due to economic issues with the new arena. In May 2026 Stabæk moved to a new stadium located next to Nadderud Stadion. The new stadium is known as Nye Nadderud Stadion and has a capacity of 8000 spectators.

The club's record home attendance was set on 13 September 2009, when 13,402 spectators attended Telenor Arena to watch a game against Rosenborg BK. The record attendance at Nadderud Stadion of approximately 10,000 spectators dates from the quarter-final of the 1970 Norwegian Cup, a game Stabæk lost 2–4 against Strømsgodset.

== Chairman ==
On 4 February 2010, Einar Schultz was elected chairman of Stabæk, replacing Ingebrigt Steen Jensen. Schultz has held various positions in the Stabæk system over the last five years. In February 2012, Kjell Johnsen was elected the new chairman of Stabæk Fotball. Johnsen was replaced in 2013 by Espen Moe. Jonas Benkow took over as chairman in March 2025.

== European record ==
Season	Competition	Round	Opponents	Home	Away	Aggregate
1997	UEFA Intertoto Cup	Group 5	(Greece) Panachaiki	–	1–1	3rd
1997	UEFA Intertoto Cup	Group 5	(Faroe Islands) B36 Tórshavn	5–0	–	3rd
1997	UEFA Intertoto Cup	Group 5	(Belgium) Racing Genk	–	3–4	3rd
1997	UEFA Intertoto Cup	Group 5	(Russia) Dynamo Moscow	1–1	–	3rd
1998	UEFA Intertoto Cup	First round	(Serbia) Vojvodina	1–2	2–3	3–5
1999–00	UEFA Cup	First round	(Spain) Deportivo La Coruña	1–0	0–2	1–2
2000	UEFA Intertoto Cup	First round	(Malta) Floriana	2–0	1–1	3–1
2000	UEFA Intertoto Cup	Second round	(France) Auxerre	0–2	0–3	0–5
2002–03	UEFA Cup	Qualifying round	(Northern Ireland) Linfield	4–0	1–1	5–1
2002–03	UEFA Cup	First round	(Belgium) Anderlecht	1–2	1–0	2–2
2004–05	UEFA Cup	Second qualifying round	(Finland) Haka	3–1	3–1	6–2
2004–05	UEFA Cup	First round	(France) Sochaux	0–5	0–4	0–9
2008–09	UEFA Cup	Second qualifying round	(France) Rennes	2–1	0–2	2–3
2009–10	UEFA Champions League	Second qualifying round	(Albania) Tirana	4–0	1–1	5–1
2009–10	UEFA Champions League	Third qualifying round	(Denmark) Copenhagen	0–0	1–3	1–3
2009–10	UEFA Europa League	Play-off round	(Spain) Valencia	0–3	1–4	1–7
2010–11	UEFA Europa League	Second qualifying round	(Belarus) Dnepr Mogilev	2–2	1–1	3–3 (a)
2012–13	UEFA Europa League	First qualifying round	(Finland) JJK Jyväskylä	3–2	0–2	3–4
2016–17	UEFA Europa League	First qualifying round	(Wales) Connah's Quay Nomads	0–1	0–0	0–1

== Honours ==
- Eliteserien
  - Champions: 2008
  - Runners-up: 2007
  - Third place: 1998, 2003, 2009, 2015
- Norwegian Football Cup
  - Champions: 1998
  - Runners-up: 2008
- Superfinalen
  - Champions: 2009

== Recent history ==
Stabæk Fotball seasons
Season	League	Pos	Pld	W	D	L	GS	GA	Pts	Cup	Notes
1994	1. divisjon	↑ 2	22	13	3	6	43	32	42	Third round	Promoted to the Tippeligaen
1995	Tippeligaen	9	26	9	6	11	36	40	33	Fourth round	
1996	Tippeligaen	6	26	9	9	8	47	45	36	Quarter-final	UEFA Intertoto Cup
1997	Tippeligaen	5	26	13	4	9	33	35	43	Quarter-final	UEFA Intertoto Cup
1998	Tippeligaen	3	26	16	5	5	63	29	53	Champions	UEFA Cup
1999	Tippeligaen	5	26	14	4	8	58	49	46	Fourth round	UEFA Intertoto Cup
2000	Tippeligaen	5	26	12	6	8	59	33	42	Third round	
2001	Tippeligaen	4	26	14	3	9	45	39	45	Fourth round	UEFA Cup
2002	Tippeligaen	5	26	12	6	8	48	34	42	Semi-final	
2003	Tippeligaen	3	26	11	9	6	51	35	42	Fourth round	UEFA Cup
2004	Tippeligaen	↓ 13	26	7	6	13	25	40	27	Semi-final	Relegated to the 1. divisjon
2005	1. divisjon	↑ 1	30	20	7	3	63	23	67	Quarter-final	Promoted to the Tippeligaen
2006	Tippeligaen	5	26	10	9	7	53	36	39	Third round	
2007	Tippeligaen	2	26	14	6	6	53	38	48	Semi-final	UEFA Cup
2008	Tippeligaen	1	26	16	6	4	58	24	54	Final	UEFA Champions League
2009	Tippeligaen	3	30	15	8	7	52	34	53	Quarter-final	UEFA Europa League
2010	Tippeligaen	12	30	11	6	13	46	47	39	Third round	
2011	Tippeligaen	10	30	11	6	13	44	50	39	Third round	UEFA Europa League
2012	Tippeligaen	↓ 16	30	5	2	23	25	69	17	Third round	Relegated to the 1. divisjon
2013	1. divisjon	↑ 2	30	14	10	6	51	46	52	Fourth round	Promoted to the Tippeligaen
2014	Tippeligaen	9	30	11	6	13	44	52	39	Semi-final	
2015	Tippeligaen	3	30	17	5	8	54	43	56	Semi-final	UEFA Europa League
2016	Tippeligaen	14	30	8	7	15	35	42	31	Fourth round	Reprieved from relegation after play-off
2017	Eliteserien	9	30	10	9	11	46	50	39	Quarter-final	
2018	Eliteserien	14	30	6	11	13	37	50	29	Third round	Reprieved from relegation after play-off
2019	Eliteserien	8	30	10	10	10	38	36	40	Fourth round	
2020	Eliteserien	8	30	9	12	9	41	45	39	Cancelled	
2021	Eliteserien	↓ 15	30	6	7	17	35	62	25	Third round	Relegated to the 1. divisjon
2022	1. divisjon	↑ 2	30	16	10	4	62	28	58	Semi-final	Promoted to the Eliteserien
2023	Eliteserien	↓ 15	30	7	8	15	30	48	29	Second round	Relegated to the 1. divisjon
2024	1. divisjon	7	30	12	6	12	57	59	42	Quarter-final	
2025	1. divisjon	11	30	7	10	13	45	53	31	Quarter-final	
2026	1. divisjon	4	30	18	4	8	70	38	58	Third round	

== Records ==
- Greatest home victory: 8–0 vs. Molde FK, 29 October 2006
- Greatest away victory: 14–0 vs. Vestfossen IF, 12 May 2008
- Heaviest home loss: 0–7 vs. Lillestrøm SK, 20 March 2011
- Heaviest away loss: 1–8 vs. SK Brann, 24 May 2001
- Highest attendance, Telenor Arena: 13 402 vs. Rosenborg BK, 13 September 2009
- Highest average attendance, season: 9,472, 2009
- Most appearances, total: 365, (Norway) Morten Skjønsberg (2001–2011, 2014–2017)
- Most appearances, league: 320, (Norway) Morten Skjønsberg (2001–2011, 2014–2017)
- Most goals scored, total: 111, (Sweden) Daniel Nannskog (2005–2009)
- Most goals scored, league: 101, (Sweden) Daniel Nannskog (2005–2010)
- Most goals scored, Eliteserien: 62, (Sweden) Daniel Nannskog (2006–2009)
- Most goals scored, season: 32, (Sweden) Daniel Nannskog (2005)
- Most goals scored, Eliteserien, season: 19, (Norway) Petter Belsvik (1998), (Sweden) Daniel Nannskog (2006; 2007)

== Players ==
=== Current squad ===
As of 3 September 2026

Note: Flags indicate national team as defined under FIFA eligibility rules; some limited exceptions apply. Players may hold more than one non-FIFA nationality.

No.	Pos.	Nation	Player
1	GK	GER	Kimi Løkkevik
2	DF	NOR	Fillip Jenssen Riise
4	DF	NOR	Nicolai Næss (captain)
5	DF	NOR	Jørgen Skjelvik
6	MF	SRB	Aleksa Matić
7	MF	NOR	Oscar Solnørdal
8	FW	NOR	Magnus Lankhof Dahlby
9	FW	GAM	Alagie Sanyang
10	MF	NOR	Sebastian Olderheim
11	FW	DEN	Frederik Ellegaard
14	DF	NOR	Eirik Lereng
15	DF	NOR	Olav Lilleøren Veum
16	DF	NOR	Andreas Hoven
17	DF	NOR	Mats Frimann Hansen

No.	Pos.	Nation	Player
18	FW	NOR	Oskar Dæhli Oppedal
19	MF	NOR	Marius Lundemo
20	FW	SWE	Gottfrid Rapp (on loan from Elfsborg)
21	MF	NOR	Fredrik Krogstad
22	GK	NOR	Marius Amundsen Ulla
23	MF	NOR	William Nicolai Wendt
24	FW	NOR	Jacob Hanstad
25	FW	GHA	Bossman Debrah
27	DF	NOR	Mats Frimann Hansen
28	MF	NOR	Danilo dos Santos Jonker
29	DF	NOR	Karsten Arman Ekorness
31	GK	NOR	Henri Sørlie
33	FW	NOR	Axel Aamodt
34	MF	NOR	Lucas Myklebust

For season transfers, see List of Norwegian football transfers winter 2025–26, and List of Norwegian football transfers summer 2026.

=== Out on loan ===
Note: Flags indicate national team as defined under FIFA eligibility rules; some limited exceptions apply. Players may hold more than one non-FIFA nationality.

No.	Pos.	Nation	Player
3	DF	NOR	Jon Haukvik Øya (at Hønefoss until 30 November 2026)
—	MF	NOR	Kristian Lønstad Onsrud (at Raufoss until 31 December 2026)
12	GK	NOR	Leander Larona Gunnerød (at Eik Tønsberg until 1 November 2026)

== Managers ==
As of 8 November 2026

Team	From	To	Record				
Team	From	To	G	W	D	L	Win %
Lars Tjernås	1993	1995					
(Sweden) Hans Backe	1 January 1996	31 December 1997					
(Sweden) Anders Linderoth	1 January 1998	26 May 2001					
Gaute Larsen	26 May 2001	28 September 2004					
Pål Berg (interim)	29 September 2004	30 November 2004	5	1	1	3	20.00
(Sweden) Jan Jönsson	1 December 2004	31 December 2010	203	109	47	47	53.69
(Sweden) Jörgen Lennartsson	1 January 2011	27 November 2011	33	13	6	14	39.39
(Norway) Petter Belsvik	2 January 2012	23 November 2013	69	24	12	33	34.78
(United States) Bob Bradley	3 January 2014	10 November 2015	72	38	11	23	52.78
(Scotland) Billy McKinlay	30 November 2015	8 July 2016	14	3	1	10	21.43
(Spain) Toni Ordinas	8 July 2016	27 June 2018	60	17	20	23	28.33
(Norway) Henning Berg	4 July 2018	6 June 2019	23	5	7	11	21.74
Jan Jönsson	11 June 2019	4 July 2021	64	19	24	21	29.69
(Norway) Eirik Kjønø	9 July 2021	16 August 2022	46	19	11	16	41.30
(Norway) Lars Bohinen	19 August 2022	5 September 2023	34	13	8	13	38.24
(United States) Bob Bradley	10 September 2023	22 September 2024	38	16	10	12	42.11
(Norway) Bjørn Helge Riise (Caretaker)	22 September 2024	9 December 2024	8	3	0	5	37.50
(Sweden) Jörgen Wålemark	9 December 2024	9 July 2025	17	7	4	6	41.18
(Norway) Bjørn Helge Riise (Caretaker)	9 July 2025	15 August 2025	6	1	2	3	16.67
(Sweden) Mikael Stahre	15 August 2025	24 November 2025	12	5	4	3	41.67
(Norway) Kjell André Thu	18 December 2025		31	19	4	8	61.29

== Women's team ==
Stabæk Fotball also fields a women's team. In 2009, Stabæk became the first Norwegian association football club with both their men's and women's teams in the premier divisions.

== Notable Players ==
- Alanzinho
