= 2010 Norwegian Football Cup =

Coordinates: 59°56′56″N 10°44′04″E

Norgesmesterskapet i fotball for herrer

Tournament details
- Country: Norway
- Teams: 275 (overall); 128 (main competition)

Final positions
- Champions: Strømsgodset (5th title)
- Runners-up: Follo

Tournament statistics
- Matches played: 127
- Goals scored: 508 (4 per match)
- Top goal scorer(s): Kenneth Kvalheim; Péter Kovács; Eirik Markegård (6 goals each)

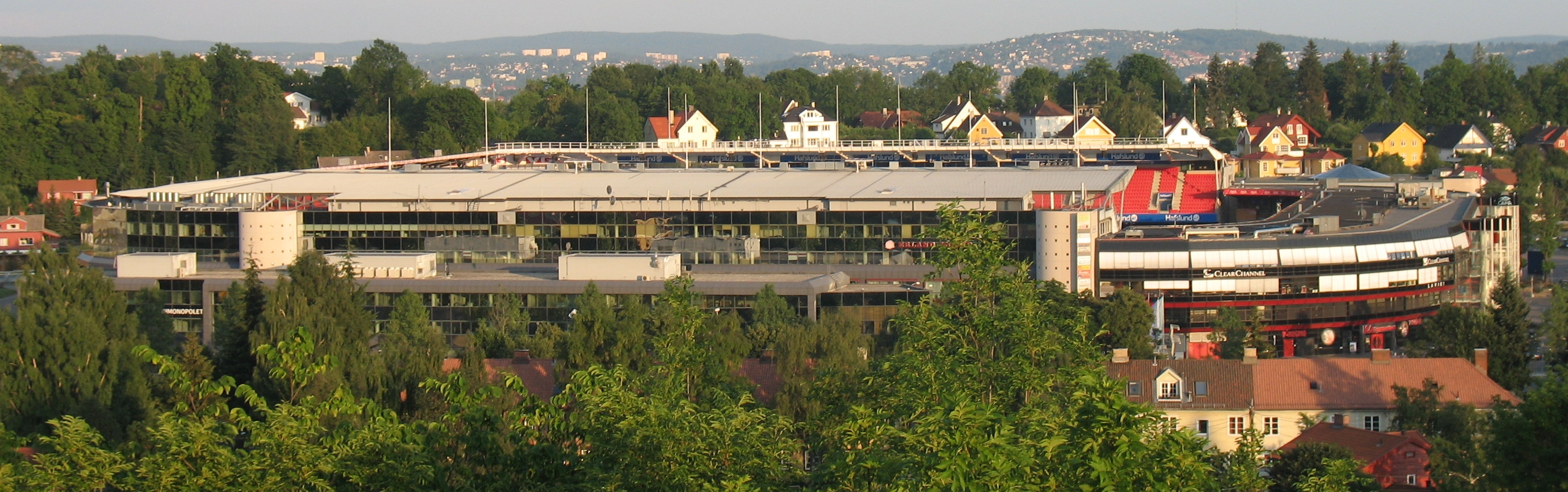
Ullevaal Stadion, Oslo - venue for the Norwegian Cup final

The 2010 Norwegian Football Cup was the 105th season of the Norwegian annual knockout football tournament. The competition started with two qualifying rounds on 11 April and 21 April, and the final was held on 14 November at Ullevaal Stadion. A total of 127 games were played and 508 goals were scored. The defending champions were Aalesund.

The winners of the Cup, Strømsgodset, can call themselves Champions of Norway and qualified for the third qualifying round of the 2011–12 UEFA Europa League.

== Calendar ==
Round	Main date	Number of fixtures	Clubs
First Qualifying Round	11 April 2010	98	275 → 177
Second Qualifying Round	21 April 2010	49	177 → 128
First Round	13 May 2010	64	128 → 64
Second Round	19 May 2010	32	64 → 32
Third Round	9 June 2010	16	32 → 16
Fourth Round	7 July 2010	8	16 → 8
Quarter-finals	14–15 August 2010	4	8 → 4
Semi-finals	22–23 September 2010	2	4 → 2
Final	14 November 2010	1	2 → 1

== First round ==
Team 1	Score	Team 2
12 May 2010
Grorud	1–2	Eidsvold Turn
Skeid	1–0	Lørenskog
Kjelsås	4–2	Fram Larvik
Brumunddal	5–2	Oslo City
Kongsberg	1–6	Strømmen
Tollnes	0–6	Notodden
Randaberg	2–1	Ålgård
Stavanger	3–0	Vidar
Fyllingen	0–0 (4–2 p)	Os
Vadmyra	1–4	Fana
Nest-Sotra	2–1	Åsane
Varegg	0–1	Stord
Årdal	0–4	Sogndal
Fjøra	1–6	Førde
Træff	0–1	Kristiansund
Skarbøvik	1–0	Hødd
Mo	1–2	Steinkjer
Strindheim	6–2	Kolstad
Orkla	1–5	Byåsen
Kopervik	1–2	Vard Haugesund
Stålkameratene	2–1	Harstad
Fløya	2–0	Senja
Trosvik	0–6	Fredrikstad
Sprint-Jeløy	1–3	Asker
Drøbak/Frogn	1–3	Sarpsborg 08
Kolbotn	0–5	Follo
KFUM Oslo	1–0	Ørn-Horten
Hasle-Løren	0–1	Sandefjord
Oldenborg	0–1	Kongsvinger
Oppsal	1–11	Vålerenga
Korsvoll	1–4	Moss
Sagene	0–2	Lyn
Høland	1–12	Stabæk
Hauerseter	0–5	Lillestrøm
Flisa	1–1 (3–5 p)	Nybergsund
Ottestad	0–6	HamKam
Lillehammer	3–2	Manglerud Star
Gjøvik FF	1–3	Raufoss
Jevnaker	0–7	Hønefoss
Modum	1–5	Strømsgodset
Birkebeineren	0–3	Mjøndalen
Tønsberg	5–2	Ull/Kisa
Pors Grenland	1–2	Bærum
Herkules	2–3	Odd Grenland
Jerv	0–3	Start
Frøyland	1–2	Bryne
Mandalskameratene	1–0	Vindbjart
Trauma	1–3	Flekkerøy
Klepp	0–4	Haugesund
Hana	2–7	Sandnes Ulf
Brodd	0–2	Viking
Arna-Bjørnar	0–2	Brann
Hovding	0–4	Løv-Ham
Voss	1–4	Valdres
Volda	0–1	Aalesund
Surnadal	1–3	Molde
Nardo	0–0 (5–4 p)	Frigg
Malvik	2–5	Ranheim
Stjørdals-Blink	0–4	Rosenborg
Verdal	0–3	Levanger
Innstranden	2–5	Bodø/Glimt
Sortland	0–6	Tromsø
Ishavsbyen	0–5	Tromsdalen
Hammerfest	0–3	Alta

== Second round ==
Team 1	Score	Team 2
19 May 2010
Moss	3–1	KFUM Oslo
Kjelsås	2–3	Sandefjord
Bærum	0–2	Stabæk
Asker	1–2	Sarpsborg 08
Eidsvold Turn	0–4	Strømmen
HamKam	0–0 (10–11 p)	Nybergsund
Brumunddal	1–6	Lillestrøm
Lillehammer	2–5	Kongsvinger
Raufoss	0–1	Strømsgodset
Valdres	3–3 (7–8 p)	Hønefoss
Tønsberg	3–2	Vålerenga
Notodden	0–1	Mjøndalen
Flekkerøy	1–2	Odd Grenland
Mandalskameratene	1–2	Start
Bryne	4–1	Stavanger
Sandnes Ulf	1–0	Stord
Randaberg	2–4	Viking
Vard Haugesund	1–2	Haugesund
Fana	0–3	Lyn
Fyllingen	1–0	Brann
Nest-Sotra	1–4	Løv-Ham
Førde	2–3	Sogndal
Skarbøvik	2–3	Aalesund
Kristiansund	1–2 (a.e.t.)	Ranheim
Byåsen	0–2	Tromsø
Strindheim	2–4	Molde
Steinkjer	1–4	Rosenborg
Stålkameratene	0–3	Bodø/Glimt
Tromsdalen	5–1	Fløya
Alta	3–1	Nardo
20 May 2010
Skeid	2–4	Fredrikstad
Levanger	2–3	Follo

== Third round ==
The games were played, in a one-leg format, on 9–10 and 30 June.

Team 1	Score	Team 2
9 June 2010
Odd Grenland	6–2	Mjøndalen
Follo	4–2	Lillestrøm
Lyn	2–4	Strømsgodset
Stabæk	3–3 (3–4 p)	Tønsberg
Kongsvinger	2–1 (a.e.t.)	Nybergsund
Strømmen	2–5	Fredrikstad
Sandefjord	4–2	Moss
Løv-Ham	2–1	Aalesund
Molde	1–3	Sogndal
Bodø/Glimt	1–2 (a.e.t.)	Ranheim
Tromsdalen	0–2 (a.e.t.)	Tromsø
Haugesund	6–1	Bryne
10 June 2010
Fyllingen	1–4	Viking
Start	2–0	Sandnes Ulf
30 June 2010
Rosenborg	3–1	Alta
Sarpsborg 08	2–2 (3–5 p)	Hønefoss

== Fourth round ==
The draw was made on 11 June. The Games were played in a one-leg format.

7 July 2010
18:00 CEST (UTC+2)

Sogndal	3–1	Løv-Ham
Solheim 13'; E. Olsen 60'; Elvis 72'	Report	Ehiorobo 26'

Fosshaugane Campus, Sogndalsfjøra
Attendance: 1,655
Referee: Kristoffer Helgerud (Lier)

7 July 2010
18:00 CEST (UTC+2)

Sandefjord	1–4	Rosenborg
Lustig 59' (o.g.)	Report	Skjelbred 3'; Moldskred 45', 68'; Dorsin 73'

Komplett.no Arena, Sandefjord
Attendance: 2,364
Referee: Espen Berntsen (Vang)

7 July 2010
18:00 CEST (UTC+2)

Strømsgodset	3–0	Haugesund
Rnkovic 9'; M. Pedersen 41', 71'	Report

Marienlyst Stadion, Drammen
Attendance: 2,133
Referee: Per Ivar Staberg (Harstad)

7 July 2010
18:00 CEST (UTC+2)

Tønsberg	0–2	Follo
	Report	Markegård 57'; Grini 73'

Tønsberg Gressbane, Tønsberg
Attendance: 2,535
Referee: Roy Helge Olsen (Fløy)

7 July 2010
18:00 CEST (UTC+2)

Hønefoss	1–5	Odd Grenland
Byfuglien 90'	Report	Brenne 6'; Kovács 27', 56'; M. Fevang 41' (pen.); Akabueze 90'

AKA Arena, Hønefoss
Attendance: 1,056
Referee: Tommy Skjerven (Kaupanger)

7 July 2010
18:00 CEST (UTC+2)

Viking	2–0	Kongsvinger
Danielsen 10'; T. Høiland 85'	Report

Viking Stadion, Stavanger
Attendance: 2,182
Referee: Terje Hauge (Olsvik)

7 July 2010
18:00 CEST (UTC+2)

Tromsø	0–2	Ranheim
	Report	Krogstad 24'; Stene 34' (pen.)

Alfheim Stadion, Tromsø
Attendance: 948
Referee: Tom Henning Øvrebø (Nordstrand)

7 July 2010
18:00 CEST (UTC+2)

Fredrikstad	0–1	Start
	Report	Pepa 69'

Fredrikstad Stadion, Fredrikstad
Attendance: 3,452
Referee: Svein Oddvar Moen (Haugar)

== Quarter-finals ==
14 August 2010
14:00 CEST (UTC+2)

Ranheim	1–2	Strømsgodset
Aas 4'	Report	Keita 45'; Nordkvelle 73'

DnB NOR Arena, Ranheim
Attendance: 1,815
Referee: Svein-Erik Edvartsen (Hamar)

14 August 2010
19:45 CEST (UTC+2)

Rosenborg	4–3	Start
Iversen 28' (pen.); Lustig 47'; Annan 49'; Olsen 51'	Report	Espen Hoff 5'; Årst 9', 53'

Lerkendal Stadion, Trondheim
Attendance: 5,987
Referee: Tom Harald Hagen (Grue)

15 August 2010
18:00 CEST (UTC+2)

Follo	3–1	Sogndal
Skogmo 70'; Markegård 75', 90'	Report	Olsen 15'

Ski stadion, Ski
Attendance: 2,008
Referee: Dag Vidar Hafsås (Kolstad)

15 August 2010
20:00 CEST (UTC+2)

Odd Grenland	2–1	Viking
Bertelsen 22' (o.g.); Kovács 57'	Report	Ingelsten 27'

Skagerak Arena, Skien
Attendance: 4,739
Referee: Kjetil Sælen (Arna-Bjørnar)

== Semi-finals ==
22 September 2010
16:00 CEST (UTC+2)

Follo	3–2 (a.e.t.)	Rosenborg
Hagen 40'; Markegård 74'; Clausen 114'	Report	Markus Henriksen 5'; Iversen 62'

Ski Stadion, Ski
Attendance: 4,508
Referee: Roy Helge Olsen (Fløy)

22 September 2010
20:00 CEST (UTC+2)

Strømsgodset	2–0 (a.e.t.)	Odd Grenland
Morrison 100'; Kamara 119'	Report

Marienlyst Stadion, Drammen
Attendance: 7,444
Referee: Svein Oddvar Moen (Haugar)

== Final ==
14 November 2010
13:15 CET (UTC+1)

Follo	0–2	Strømsgodset
	Report	Kamara 30'; Andersen 42'

Ullevaal Stadion, Oslo
Attendance: 24,532
Referee: Tom Harald Hagen (Grue)
