= 2010 in Norwegian football =

Football in Norway
- Season: 2010

Men's football
- Tippeligaen: Rosenborg
- 1. divisjon: Sogndal
- 2. divisjon: Asker (Group 1); Hødd (Group 2); Randaberg (Group 3); HamKam (Group 4)
- Cupen: Strømsgodset
- Superfinalen: Rosenborg

Women's football
- Toppserien: Stabæk
- 1. divisjon: Sandviken
- Cupen: Røa

The 2010 season was the 105th season of competitive football in Norway.

== Men's football ==
=== League season ===
==== Tippeligaen ====
Pos	Team	Pld	W	D	L	GF	GA	GD	Pts	Qualification or relegation
1	Rosenborg (C)	30	19	11	0	58	24	+34	68	Qualification for the Champions League second qualifying round
2	Vålerenga	30	19	4	7	69	36	+33	61	Qualification for the Europa League second qualifying round
3	Tromsø	30	14	8	8	36	30	+6	50	Qualification for the Europa League first qualifying round (Note: Norway was among the best three associations in the UEFA Fair Play ranking and thus received an additional spot in the first qualifying round of the Europa League.)
4	Aalesund	30	14	5	11	46	37	+9	47	Qualification for the Europa League first qualifying round
5	Odd Grenland	30	12	10	8	48	41	+7	46	
6	Haugesund	30	12	9	9	51	39	+12	45	
7	Strømsgodset	30	13	4	13	51	59	−8	43	Qualification for the Europa League third qualifying round (Note: Strømsgodset qualified for the third qualifying round of the UEFA Europa League as winners of the 2010 Norwegian Cup.)
8	Start	30	11	9	10	57	60	−3	42	
9	Viking	30	10	11	9	48	41	+7	41	
10	Lillestrøm	30	9	13	8	51	44	+7	40	
11	Molde	30	10	10	10	42	45	−3	40	
12	Stabæk	30	11	6	13	46	47	−1	39	
13	Brann	30	8	10	12	48	50	−2	34	
14	Hønefoss (R)	30	7	6	17	28	62	−34	27	Qualification for the relegation play-offs
15	Kongsvinger (R)	30	4	8	18	27	58	−31	20	Relegation to First Division
16	Sandefjord (R)	30	2	6	22	25	58	−33	12	Relegation to First Division

Source: fotball.no
Rules for classification: 1) points; 2) goal difference; 3) number of goals scored.
(C) Champions; (R) Relegated

==== 1. divisjon ====
Pos	Team	Pld	W	D	L	GF	GA	GD	Pts	Promotion or relegation
1	Sogndal (C, P)	28	17	5	6	51	28	+23	56	Promotion to Tippeligaen
2	Sarpsborg 08 (P)	28	16	6	6	54	36	+18	54	Promotion to Tippeligaen
3	Fredrikstad (O, P)	28	14	8	6	53	37	+16	50	Qualification for the promotion play-offs
4	Løv-Ham	28	13	4	11	46	38	+8	43	Qualification for the promotion play-offs
5	Ranheim	28	12	7	9	37	38	−1	43	Qualification for the promotion play-offs
6	Bodø/Glimt	28	12	6	10	41	28	+13	42	
7	Strømmen	28	12	4	12	43	42	+1	40	
8	Alta	28	10	6	12	41	51	−10	36	
9	Bryne	28	10	5	13	57	52	+5	35	
10	Mjøndalen	28	10	5	13	41	49	−8	35	
11	Nybergsund	28	9	8	11	38	47	−9	35	
12	Follo (R)	28	8	8	12	35	43	−8	32	Relegation to Second Division (Note: Follo did not finish their licensing application for the 2011 season before the time limit of September 15, and were thus relegated at the end of the season even though they finished outside the relegation zone. As a result of this, Sandnes Ulf, which was the best placed team of those inside the relegation zone, avoided relegation.)
13	Sandnes Ulf	28	8	7	13	33	40	−7	31	
14	Tromsdalen (R)	28	8	4	16	33	50	−17	28	Relegation to Second Division
15	Moss (R)	28	7	5	16	32	56	−24	26	Relegation to Second Division
16	Lyn (D, R)	0	0	0	0	0	0	0	0	Relegation to Sixth Division (Note: FK Lyn elected to file for bankruptcy on 30 June, following an extended period of financial distress, and formally withdrew from the league on 7 July. Pursuant to the rules and regulations of the competition, all games involving Lyn have been annulled and the team placed at the bottom of the standings.)

Source: nifs.no
Rules for classification: 1) points; 2) goal difference; 3) number of goals scored.
(C) Champions; (D) Disqualified; (O) Play-off winners; (P) Promoted; (R) Relegated

==== 2. divisjon ====
===== Group 1 =====
Pos	Team	Pld	W	D	L	GF	GA	GD	Pts	Promotion or relegation
1	Asker (P)	26	17	6	3	71	30	+41	57	Promotion to First Division
2	Notodden	26	16	3	7	71	25	+46	51	
3	Kjelsås	26	14	5	7	58	47	+11	47	
4	Nest-Sotra	26	14	4	8	54	50	+4	46	
5	Manglerud Star	26	11	8	7	62	46	+16	41	
6	Åsane	26	11	5	10	49	46	+3	38	
7	Bærum	26	10	5	11	52	44	+8	35	
8	Førde	26	10	5	11	43	61	−18	35	
9	Frigg	26	8	10	8	44	48	−4	34	
10	Vålerenga 2	26	10	2	14	61	68	−7	32	
11	Stabæk 2	26	8	7	11	41	53	−12	31	
12	Os (R)	26	7	6	13	41	52	−11	27	Relegation to Third Division
13	Stord (R)	26	5	5	16	35	71	−36	20	Relegation to Third Division
14	Fana (R)	26	3	5	18	27	68	−41	14	Relegation to Third Division

(P) Promoted; (R) Relegated

===== Group 2 =====
Pos	Team	Pld	W	D	L	GF	GA	GD	Pts	Promotion or relegation
1	Hødd (P)	26	18	6	2	81	23	+58	60	Promotion to First Division
2	Kristiansund	26	17	4	5	60	35	+25	55	
3	Skeid	26	15	5	6	49	28	+21	50	
4	Rosenborg 2	26	14	5	7	64	39	+25	47	
5	Aalesund 2	26	11	3	12	36	47	−11	36	
6	Nardo	26	9	7	10	44	46	−2	34	
7	Strindheim	26	8	9	9	33	42	−9	33	
8	Molde 2	26	8	8	10	47	57	−10	32	
9	Steinkjer	26	9	4	13	40	56	−16	31	
10	Levanger	26	8	6	12	46	49	−3	30	
11	Byåsen (Note: Byåsen was docked two points for using an ineligible player.)	26	8	7	11	40	60	−20	29	
12	Skarbøvik (R)	26	8	4	14	34	39	−5	28	Relegation to Third Division
13	Oslo City (R)	26	5	4	17	37	61	−24	19	Relegation to Third Division
14	Kolstad (R)	26	3	10	13	32	61	−29	19	Relegation to Third Division

(P) Promoted; (R) Relegated

===== Group 3 =====
Pos	Team	Pld	W	D	L	GF	GA	GD	Pts	Promotion or relegation
1	Randaberg (P)	26	17	2	7	51	40	+11	53	Promotion to First Division
2	Flekkerøy	26	14	5	7	60	33	+27	47	
3	FK Tønsberg	26	13	7	6	62	39	+23	46	
4	Ørn-Horten	26	14	3	9	52	46	+6	45	
5	Vard Haugesund (Note: Vard was docked three points for using an ineligible player.)	26	13	4	9	54	35	+19	40	
6	Odd Grenland 2	26	10	8	8	40	41	−1	38	
7	Vindbjart	26	11	5	10	47	52	−5	38	
8	Vidar	26	10	7	9	47	40	+7	37	
9	Pors Grenland	26	11	4	11	41	41	0	37	
10	Ålgård	26	8	10	8	45	36	+9	34	
11	Fram Larvik	26	9	6	11	45	53	−8	33	
12	Start 2 (Note: Start 2 was docked one point for using an ineligible player.) (R)	26	7	6	13	40	51	−11	26	Relegation to Third Division
13	Kopervik (R)	26	4	3	19	29	65	−36	15	Relegation to Third Division
14	Stavanger (Note: Stavanger was docked one point for using an ineligible player.) (R)	26	3	6	17	29	70	−41	14	Relegation to Third Division

(P) Promoted; (R) Relegated

===== Group 4 =====
Pos	Team	Pld	W	D	L	GF	GA	GD	Pts	Promotion or relegation
1	HamKam (P)	26	19	2	5	75	25	+50	59	Promotion to First Division
2	KFUM Oslo	26	18	3	5	69	30	+39	56 (Note: KFUM was docked one point for using an ineligible player.)	
3	Brumunddal	26	14	4	8	62	50	+12	46	
4	Raufoss	26	13	3	10	41	38	+3	42	
5	Harstad	26	13	2	11	58	51	+7	41	
6	Tromsø 2	26	12	1	13	51	50	+1	37	
7	Lørenskog	26	11	3	12	56	55	+1	36	
8	Senja	26	10	5	11	48	52	−4	35	
9	Valdres	26	10	5	11	40	45	−5	35	
10	Ull-Kisa	26	9	5	12	43	56	−13	32	
11	Strømsgodset 2	26	9	4	13	63	70	−7	31	
12	Lillehammer (Note: Lillehammer survived as the best number-twelve-team, because the club Lyn was liquidated.)	26	9	4	13	45	53	−8	31	
13	Eidsvold Turn (R)	26	7	5	14	41	58	−17	26	Relegation to Third Division
14	Mo (R)	26	3	4	19	26	85	−59	13	Relegation to Third Division

(P) Promoted; (R) Relegated

=== Cup competitions ===
==== Norwegian Cup ====
===== Final =====
14 November 2010
13:15 CET (UTC+1)

Follo	0–2	Strømsgodset
	Report	Kamara 30'; Andersen 42'

Ullevaal Stadion, Oslo
Attendance: 24,532
Referee: Tom Harald Hagen (Grue)

==== Superfinalen ====
7 March 2010
19:00 CET

Aalesund	1–3	Rosenborg
Larsen 59'	Report	Stadsgaard 7'; Prica 26'; Olsen 49'

Color Line Stadion, Ålesund
Attendance: 3,180
Referee: Tommy Skjerven (Kaupanger)

== Women's football ==
=== League season ===
==== Toppserien ====
Pos	Team	Pld	W	D	L	GF	GA	GD	Pts	Qualification or relegation
1	Stabæk (C)	22	17	5	0	72	8	+64	56	Qualification for the Champions League round of 32
2	Røa	22	15	3	4	56	33	+23	48	
3	Kolbotn	22	15	2	5	49	12	+37	47	
4	Arna-Bjørnar	22	14	1	7	55	26	+29	43	
5	Trondheims-Ørn	22	12	2	8	34	29	+5	38	
6	LSK Kvinner	22	11	3	8	42	32	+10	36	
7	Klepp	22	8	5	9	34	29	+5	29	
8	Amazon Grimstad	22	9	2	11	28	43	−15	29	
9	Donn (R)	22	6	2	14	25	45	−20	20	Relegation to First Division (Note: Donn were demoted to the 1. divisjon after their licensing application for the 2011 season was denied.)
10	Kattem	22	4	2	16	17	58	−41	14	
11	Linderud-Grei	22	3	4	15	16	62	−46	13	
12	Fløya (R)	22	1	3	18	15	66	−51	6	Relegation to First Division

Source: NRK Sport
Rules for classification: 1) points; 2) goal difference; 3) number of goals scored.
(C) Champions; (R) Relegated

=== Norwegian Women's Cup ===
==== Final ====
- Røa 7–0 Trondheims-Ørn

== Men's UEFA competitions ==
=== Champions League ===
==== Qualifying phase ====
===== Second qualifying round =====
Team 1	Agg.	Team 2	1st leg	2nd leg
Linfield (Northern Ireland)	0–2	(Norway) Rosenborg	0–0	0–2

===== Third qualifying round =====
Team 1	Agg.	Team 2	1st leg	2nd leg
AIK (Sweden)	0–4	(Norway) Rosenborg	0–1	0–3

===== Play-off round =====
Team 1	Agg.	Team 2	1st leg	2nd leg
Rosenborg (Norway)	2–2 (a)	(Denmark) Copenhagen	2–1	0–1

=== UEFA Europa League ===
==== Qualifying phase ====
===== Second qualifying round =====
Team 1	Agg.	Team 2	1st leg	2nd leg
Stabæk (Norway)	3–3 (a)	(Belarus) Dnepr Mogilev	2–2	1–1
Molde (Norway)	2–2 (a)	(Latvia) Jelgava	1–0	1–2

===== Third qualifying round =====
Team 1	Agg.	Team 2	1st leg	2nd leg
Molde (Norway)	4–5	(Germany) Stuttgart	2–3	2–2
Aalesund (Norway)	1–4	(Scotland) Motherwell	1–1	0–3

==== Group stage ====
===== Group B =====
Pos	Team	Pld	W	D	L	GF	GA	GD	Pts	Qualification	LEV	ARI	ATL	RBK
1	(Germany) Bayer Leverkusen	6	3	3	0	8	2	+6	12	Advance to knockout phase	—	1–0	1–1	4–0
2	(Greece) Aris	6	3	1	2	7	5	+2	10	Advance to knockout phase	0–0	—	1–0	2–0
3	(Spain) Atlético Madrid	6	2	2	2	9	7	+2	8		1–1	2–3	—	3–0
4	(Norway) Rosenborg	6	1	0	5	3	13	−10	3		0–1	2–1	1–2	—

Source: Soccerway

== UEFA Women's Champions League ==
=== Knockout stage ===
==== Round of 32 ====
Team 1	Agg.	Team 2	1st leg	2nd leg
Zorka-BDU Minsk (Belarus)	1–2	(Norway) Røa	1–2	0–0

==== Round of 16 ====
Team 1	Agg.	Team 2	1st leg	2nd leg
Røa (Norway)	1–5	(Russia) Zvezda 2005 Perm	1–1	0–4

== National teams ==
=== Norway men's national football team ===
==== UEFA Euro 2012 qualifying ====
===== Group H =====
Pos	Team	Pld	W	D	L	GF	GA	GD	Pts	Qualification	(Denmark)	(Portugal)	(Norway)	(Iceland)	(Cyprus)
1	Denmark	8	6	1	1	15	6	+9	19	Qualify for final tournament	—	2–1	2–0	1–0	2–0
2	Portugal	8	5	1	2	21	12	+9	16 (Note: Tied on head-to-head results. Overall goal difference was used as the tiebreaker.)	Advance to play-offs	3–1	—	1–0	5–3	4–4
3	Norway	8	5	1	2	10	7	+3	16		1–1	1–0	—	1–0	3–1
4	Iceland	8	1	1	6	6	14	−8	4		0–2	1–3	1–2	—	1–0
5	Cyprus	8	0	2	6	7	20	−13	2		1–4	0–4	1–2	0–0	—

Source: UEFA
Rules for classification: Qualification tiebreakers

==== Fixtures and results ====
Date	Venue	Opponents	Score	Competition	Norwegian goalscorers
3 March	Štadión pod Dubňom, Žilina (A)	Slovakia	1–0; Report	Friendly	Morten Moldskred
29 May	Ullevaal Stadion, Oslo (H)	Montenegro	2–1; Report	Friendly	Christian Grindheim; Morten Gamst Pedersen
2 June	Ullevaal Stadion, Oslo (H)	Ukraine	0–1; Report	Friendly	
11 August	Ullevaal Stadion, Oslo (H)	France	2–1; Report	Friendly	Erik Huseklepp (2)
3 September	Laugardalsvöllur, Reykjavík (A)	Iceland	2–1; Report	Euro Qualifier	Brede Hangeland; Mohammed Abdellaoue
7 September	Ullevaal Stadion, Oslo (H)	Portugal	1–0; Report	Euro Qualifier	Erik Huseklepp
8 October	Antonis Papadopoulos Stadium, Larnaca (A)	Cyprus	2–1; Report	Euro Qualifier	John Arne Riise; John Carew
12 October	Stadion Maksimir, Zagreb (A)	Croatia	1–2; Report	Friendly	Mohammed Abdellaoue
17 November	Aviva Stadium, Dublin (A)	Republic of Ireland	2–1; Report	Friendly	Morten Gamst Pedersen; Erik Huseklepp

Key

- H = Home match
- A = Away match
- N = Neutral ground
