= 2010 Norwegian Football Cup final =

- Event: 2010 Norwegian Football Cup
Follo	Strømsgodset
0	2
- Date: 14 November 2010
- Venue: Ullevaal Stadion, Oslo
- Referee: Tom Harald Hagen
- Attendance: 24,532

The 2010 Norwegian Football Cup final was the final match of the 2010 Norwegian Football Cup, the 105th season of the Norwegian Football Cup, the premier Norwegian football cup competition organized by the Football Association of Norway (NFF). The match was played on 14 November 2010 at the Ullevaal Stadion in Oslo, and was contested between the First Division side Follo and the Tippeligaen side Strømsgodset. Strømsgodset defeated Follo 2–0 to claim the Norwegian Cup for a fifth time in their history.

== Route to the final ==
Follo		Round	Strømsgodset	
Kolbotn (D3); A 5–0	Maruti 16', 67', Shipshani 18', Skogmo 28', Tesfay 35' o.g.	First round	Modum (D3); A 5–1	Keita 19', Pedersen 22', Johansen 26', 39', Kwarasey 85'
Levanger (D2); A 3–2	Maruti 18', 85', Markegård 42'	Second round	Raufoss (D2); A 1–0	Berget 68'
Lillestrøm (TL); H 4–2	Tveter 26', 39', Markegård 35', Bwamy 68'	Third round	Lyn (D1); A 4–2	Pedersen 7', Sankoh 11', 32', Johansen 74'
Tønsberg (D2); A 2–0	Markegård 51', Grini 73'	Fourth round	Haugesund (TL); H 3–0	Rnkovic 9', Pedersen 41', 71'
Sogndal (D1); H 3–1	Skogmo 70', Markegård 75', 90'	Quarter-final	Ranheim (D1); A 2–1	Keita 45', Nordkvelle 73'
Rosenborg (TL); H 3–2 aet	Hagen 40', Markegård 74', Clausen 114'	Semi-final	Odd Grenland (TL); H 2–0 aet	Morrison 100', Kamara 119'

- (TL) = Tippeligaen team
- (D1) = 1. divisjon team
- (D2) = 2. divisjon team
- (D3) = 3. divisjon team

== Match ==
=== Details ===
14 November 2010
13:15 CET (UTC+1)

Follo	0–2	Strømsgodset
	Report	Kamara 30'; Andersen 42'

Ullevaal Stadion, Oslo
Attendance: 24,532
Referee: Tom Harald Hagen (Grue)

Follo	Strømsgodset

Follo:
GK	1	(Norway) Glenn Arne Hansen
RB	2	(Norway) Jens Kristian Skogmo
CB	6	(Norway) Christian Petersen (c)
CB	5	(Norway) Edvard Skagestad
LB	3	(Norway) Benjamin Dahl Hagen
RM	18	(Sweden) Alban Shipshani		(substituted off) 70'
CM	4	(Norway) Øystein Grini	(yellow card) 37'
CM	7	(Norway) Anders Jahnsen		(substituted off) 90'
LM	10	(Norway) Alexander Ruud Tveter
CF	25	(Norway) Eirik Markegård
CF	20	(Kenya) Bonaventure Maruti	(yellow card) 62'	(substituted off) 88'
Substitutions:
GK	13	(Norway) Sindre Evensen
MF	8	(Norway) Mads Clausen		(substituted on) 90'
FW	9	(Norway) Patrik Karoliussen		(substituted on) 70'
MF	15	(Norway) Halvor Raddum
MF	16	(Kenya) Christian Bwamy		(substituted on) 88'
DF	17	(Norway) Anders Tronbøl
MF	21	(Norway) Jørgen Røssevold
Head Coach:
(Norway) Hans Erik Eriksen

Strømsgodset:
GK	12	(Norway) Adam Larsen Kwarasey
RB	26	(Norway) Lars Christopher Vilsvik
CB	6	(Norway) Alexander Aas (c)
CB	2	(Norway) Glenn Andersen
LB	25	(Sweden) Joel Riddez
RM	22	(Norway) André Hanssen	(substituted off) 71'
LM	17	(Jamaica) Jason Morrison
RW	9	(Norway) Øyvind Storflor	(substituted off) 88'
AM	10	(Norway) Jo Inge Berget	(substituted off) 76'
LW	14	(Norway) Fredrik Nordkvelle
CF	11	(Norway) Ola Kamara
Substitutions:
GK	1	(Norway) Lars Stubhaug
DF	3	(Norway) Lars Sætra
DF	5	(Norway) Krister Aunan
MF	20	(Ghana) Mohammed Abu
FW	21	(Iceland) Gardar Jóhannsson	(substituted on) 88'
MF	27	(Sierra Leone) Alfred Sankoh	(substituted on) 71'
FW	28	(Norway) Petar Rnkovic	(substituted on) 76'
Head Coach:
(Norway) Ronny Deila

MATCH OFFICIALS

- Assistant referees:
  - Hege Steinlund (Furuflaten IL)
  - Leif Erik Opland (Byneset IL)
- Fourth official: Dag Vidar Hafsås (Kolstad IL)

MATCH RULES

- 90 minutes.
- 30 minutes of extra-time if necessary.
- Penalty shoot-out if scores still level.
- Seven named substitutes.
- Maximum of three substitutions.
