= Jens Kristian Skogmo =

Norwegian footballer (born 1987)

Personal information
- Date of birth: 16 July 1987 (age 39)
- Place of birth: Norway
- Height: 1.78 m (5 ft 10 in)
- Position: Defender

Team information
- Current team: Askim

Senior career*
Years	Team	Apps	(Gls)
2003	Askim		
2006	Moss	1	(0)
2007	Sprint-Jeløy		
2008–2015	Follo	210	(12)
2016–2017	Start	34	(0)
2018–2019	Arendal	41	(2)
2021–	Askim		

International career
2006	Norway U19	7	(0)
- * Club domestic league appearances and goals as of 15:56, 27 January 2020 (UTC)

Jens Kristian Skogmo (born 16 July 1987) is a Norwegian football defender who plays for Askim.

== Career ==
He started his career in Askim before joining Moss and Sprint-Jeløy. He then made his Tippeligaen debut on 13 March 2016 against Lillestrøm for Start.

Skogmo joined Arendal in January 2018. He left the club at the end of 2019. In 2021 he joined Askim.

== Career statistics ==
As of match played 30 July 2017.

Club	Season	Division	League		Cup		Total	
Club	Season	Division	Apps	Goals	Apps	Goals	Apps	Goals
2008	Follo	2. divisjon	25	0	0	0	25	0
2009	Follo	2. divisjon	25	2	0	0	25	2
2010	Follo	1. divisjon	27	0	6	2	33	2
2011	Follo	2. divisjon	23	0	0	0	23	0
2012	Follo	2. divisjon	26	3	1	0	27	3
2013	Follo	1. divisjon	29	3	2	0	31	3
2014	Follo	2. divisjon	26	3	3	0	29	3
2015	Follo	1. divisjon	29	1	2	0	31	0
2016	Start	Tippeligaen	20	0	1	0	21	0
2017	Start	1. divisjon	6	0	2	0	8	0
Career Total			236	12	17	2	253	14
