= Eirik Markegård =

Norwegian footballer (born 1984)

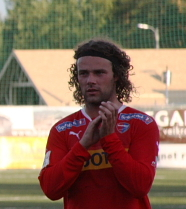

Personal information
- Date of birth: 13 February 1984 (age 42)
- Place of birth: Hemsedal, Norway
- Height: 1.83 m (6 ft 0 in)
- Position: Striker

Team information
- Current team: Jardar
- Number: 9

Youth career
- Hemsedal

Senior career*
Years	Team	Apps	(Gls)
2002–2007	Stabæk	42	(6)
2006	→ Hønefoss (loan)	19	(8)
2008–2009	Sandefjord	14	(2)
2009	→ Tønsberg (loan)	26	(23)
2010	Follo	27	(13)
2011	Strømsgodset	11	(0)
2012–2013	Follo	39	(21)
2013	Bærum	10	(1)
2014–	Jardar	4	(4)

International career^{‡}
2005	Norway U-21	5	(1)
- * Club domestic league appearances and goals as of 16 September 2014 ‡ National team caps and goals as of 26 January 2005

Eirik Markegård (born 13 February 1984) is a Norwegian footballer who plays as a striker for the Norwegian fifth Division side Jardar. He has previously played for Stabæk and Strømsgodset in Tippeligaen as well as Hønefoss, Sandefjord, Tønsberg and Follo in lower leagues. Markegård was runner-up in the Norwegian Cup in 2010 with Follo.

== Career ==
Hailing from Hemsedal in Buskerud, Markegård was both a talented alpine skier and footballer, but chose to focus on his footballing career in Hemsedal IL before he moved to Stabæk ahead of the 2002 season. He made his Tippeligaen debut in a 4–2 win against Molde on 20 October 2002, replacing Marel Baldvinsson in the 86th minute. He scored his first goal against Brann, on 20 May 2004, only 3 minutes after he came on a substitute. In the 2006 season, Markegård was loaned out to the First Division club Hønefoss. After having scored 8 goals in 19 games, he chose to return to Stabæk to try to oust Tippeligaen top two strikers, Veigar Páll Gunnarsson and Daniel Nannskog.

Markegård scored six goals in his 42 matches for Stabæk, and after his contract with the club expired he joined Sandefjord Fotball on a free transfer ahead of the 2008 season. After playing 14 matches and scoring 2 goals for Sandefjord on the second tier, He was loaned out to third-tier club FK Tønsberg in the 2009 season. In March 2010 he was released from the contract with Sandefjord and was signed by Follo, where he scored 13 goals in 27 games in the 2010 season. After missing the first round of the 2010 Norwegian Cup, he scored six goals in the next five rounds, which made him top goal-scorer in the cup that year, and was a key contributor as Follo came to the final, where they lost to Strømsgodset. After the final, Follo was relegated to the Second Division, and Markegård was released from his contract. He was wanted by Sandnes Ulf, but signed for Strømsgodset

Despite scoring a lot of goals for Strømsgodset's reserve team in the Second Division, he did not get a lot of chances for the first team in Tippeligaen. In March 2012 he was released by the club, and Markegård moved back to Follo. Markegård won promotion to the First Division with Follo in 2012, and half-way through the 2013 season he joined the Second Division side Bærum where he signed a contract till the end of the season.

== Career statistics ==
Season	Club	Division	League		Cup		Europe		Total	
Season	Club	Division	Apps	Goals	Apps	Goals	Apps	Goals	Apps	Goals
2002	Stabæk	Tippeligaen	1	0	0	0	-	-	1	0
2003	Stabæk	Tippeligaen	1	0	0	0	-	-	1	0
2004	Stabæk	Tippeligaen	11	2	3	0	4	1	18	3
2005	Stabæk	Adeccoligaen	25	4	4	2	-	-	29	6
2006	Hønefoss	Adeccoligaen	19	8	0	0	-	-	19	8
2007	Stabæk	Tippeligaen	4	0	2	1	-	-	6	1
2008	Sandefjord	Adeccoligaen	14	2	0	0	-	-	14	2
2009	Tønsberg	2. divisjon	26	23	?	?	-	-	26	23
2010	Follo	Adeccoligaen	27	13	6	6	-	-	33	19
2011	Strømsgodset	Tippeligaen	11	0	3	0	0	0	14	0
2012	Follo	2. divisjon	25	19	1	1	0	0	26	20
2013	Follo	Adeccoligaen	14	2	2	3	0	0	16	5
2013	Bærum	2. divisjon	10	1	0	0	0	0	10	1
2014	Jardar	5. Divisjon	4	4	0	0	0	0	4	4
Career Total			192	77	21	13	4	1	217	91

== Honours ==
- Top scorer, Norwegian Cup: 2010
- Top scorer, 2. divisjon/1: 2009
- Top scorer, 2. divisjon/4: 2012
