= Christian G. Petersen =

Norwegian footballer (born 1978)

Christian Petersen
Personal information
- Full name: Christian Gjestvang Petersen
- Date of birth: 25 May 1978 (age 48)
- Position: Forward

Youth career
- Ski

Senior career*
Years	Team	Apps	(Gls)
1994–1997	Ski		
1998–2001	Moss		
2002–2003	Oslo Øst		
2003–2006	Fredrikstad		
2005	Follo (loan)		
2006–2010	Follo		

International career
1994	Norway u-17	2	(1)
1995	Norway u-18	2	(0)
1996	Norway u-19	2	(0)
- * Club domestic league appearances and goals

Christian Gjestvang Petersen (born 25 May 1978) is a retired Norwegian football striker.

He was a part of a talented 1977–78 generation in Ski IL, also comprising future professionals Martin Andresen and Kenneth Løvlien and future coach Hans Erik Eriksen. They made the Oslo District team together with Hassan El Fakiri and Freddy dos Santos among others. Petersen represented Norway on u-17, u-18 and u-19 level.

Following a 1997 hat-trick in a friendly match against Tottenham Hotspur, in 1998 Petersen made his first-tier debut for Moss FK. Never becoming a top goalscorer, he went on to second-tier FK Oslo Øst in 2002. In the summer of 2003 he went to Fredrikstad FK. In the autumn of 2005 he went to Follo FK on loan, joining Follo permanently in the summer of 2006. He eventually changed position to defender, retiring after losing the 2010 Norwegian Football Cup Final.
