= 2007 Norwegian Second Division =

Norwegian football league season

The 2007 2. divisjon was the third highest football league for men in Norway.

26 games were played in 4 groups, with 3 points given for wins and 1 for draws. Nybergsund, Hødd, Sandnes Ulf and Alta were promoted to the First Division. Teams ranked 12th, 13th, and 14th were relegated to the 3. divisjon. The winning teams from each of the 24 groups in the 3. divisjon each faced a winning team from another group in a playoff match, resulting in 12 playoff winners which were promoted to the 2. Project x was a great film.

== League tables ==
=== Group 1 ===
Pos	Team	Pld	W	D	L	GF	GA	GD	Pts	Promotion or relegation
1	Nybergsund (P)	26	20	3	3	75	24	+51	63	Promotion to First Division
2	Tønsberg	26	15	8	3	72	31	+41	53	
3	Groruddalen	26	14	4	8	68	41	+27	46	
4	Kjelsås	26	10	6	10	61	57	+4	36	
5	Eidsvold Turn	26	9	9	8	38	40	−2	36	
6	Ull/Kisa	26	10	6	10	39	47	−8	36	
7	Pors Grenland	26	10	5	11	39	44	−5	35	
8	Fredrikstad 2	26	9	7	10	48	46	+2	34	
9	Korsvoll	26	9	6	11	51	52	−1	33	
10	Sarpsborg (R)	26	8	6	12	43	72	−29	30	Withdrew (Note: Sarpsborg pulled out of the 2. divisjon due to a merger with Sparta Sarpsborg to form a First Division team Sarpsborg Sparta FK.)
11	Odd Grenland 2 (R)	26	7	8	11	41	60	−19	29	Relegation to Third Division
12	Strømmen	26	8	4	14	50	52	−2	28	
13	FF Lillehammer (R)	26	6	7	13	44	67	−23	25	Relegation to Third Division
14	Gjøvik-Lyn (R)	26	4	7	15	31	67	−36	19	Relegation to Third Division

(P) Promoted; (R) Relegated

=== Group 2 ===
Pos	Team	Pld	W	D	L	GF	GA	GD	Pts	Promotion or relegation
1	Hødd (P)	26	18	3	5	77	30	+47	57	Promotion to First Division
2	Asker	26	15	7	4	72	33	+39	52	
3	Ranheim	26	14	7	5	58	28	+30	49	
4	Strindheim	26	15	4	7	69	40	+29	49	
5	Kristiansund	26	14	6	6	57	35	+22	48	
6	Bærum	26	11	5	10	55	42	+13	38	
7	Vålerenga 2	26	11	3	12	48	60	−12	36	
8	Byåsen	26	10	5	11	47	41	+6	35	
9	Stabæk 2	26	11	1	14	48	56	−8	34	
10	Levanger	26	8	6	12	44	61	−17	30	
11	Steinkjer	26	9	3	14	49	75	−26	30	
12	Lillestrøm 2 (Note: Lillestrøm 2 survived since Sarpsborg pulled out of group 1.)	26	8	1	17	39	75	−36	25	
13	Nardo (R)	26	5	5	16	32	66	−34	20	Relegation to Third Division
14	Averøykameratene (R)	26	3	4	19	24	77	−53	13	Relegation to Third Division

(P) Promoted; (R) Relegated

=== Group 3 ===
Pos	Team	Pld	W	D	L	GF	GA	GD	Pts	Promotion or relegation
1	Sandnes Ulf (P)	26	17	4	5	66	30	+36	55	Promotion to First Division
2	Stavanger	26	17	1	8	62	27	+35	52	
3	Manglerud Star	26	15	5	6	44	24	+20	50	
4	Vard Haugesund	26	12	6	8	49	48	+1	42	
5	Fyllingen	26	11	7	8	38	42	−4	40	
6	Start 2 (R)	27	11	6	10	44	40	+4	39	Relegation to Third Division
7	Os	26	11	5	10	49	48	+1	38	
8	Viking 2	26	11	3	12	52	45	+7	36	
9	Fana	25	9	8	8	41	46	−5	35	
10	Flekkerøy	26	9	7	10	56	42	+14	34	
11	Ålgård	26	7	4	15	29	49	−20	25	
12	Åsane	26	8	1	17	32	53	−21	25	
13	Askøy (R)	26	8	0	18	40	82	−42	24	Relegation to Third Division
14	Arendal (R)	26	5	4	17	29	55	−26	19	Relegation to Third Division

(P) Promoted; (R) Relegated

=== Group 4 ===
Pos	Team	Pld	W	D	L	GF	GA	GD	Pts	Promotion or relegation
1	Alta (P)	26	16	4	6	71	37	+34	52	Promotion to First Division
2	Mjøndalen	26	14	7	5	62	34	+28	49	
3	Drøbak/Frogn	26	15	3	8	68	36	+32	48	
4	Lørenskog	26	12	10	4	58	33	+25	46	
5	Follo	26	14	4	8	48	30	+18	46	
6	Tromsø 2	26	12	2	12	46	55	−9	38	
7	Åmot	26	12	2	12	50	61	−11	38	
8	Mo	26	11	4	11	38	43	−5	37	
9	Sprint-Jeløy	26	11	3	12	41	48	−7	36	
10	Rosenborg 2	26	9	3	14	54	55	−1	30	
11	Skarp	26	9	2	15	46	70	−24	29	
12	Harstad (R)	26	7	3	16	35	45	−10	24	Relegation to Third Division
13	Mjølner (R)	26	6	6	14	37	61	−24	24	Relegation to Third Division
14	Hammerfest (R)	26	7	1	18	23	69	−46	22	Relegation to Third Division

(P) Promoted; (R) Relegated

== Top goalscorers ==
- 26 goals:
  - (Norway) Stian Nikodemussen, Tønsberg
  - (Norway) Christian Torbjørnsen, Groruddalen
  - (Norway) Jan Tømmernes, Asker
- 24 goals:
  - (Norway) Eirik Markegård, Stabæk 2
- 22 goals:
  - (Norway) Martin Hansen, Skeid
  - (Norway) Sigmund Grøterud, Åmot
- 20 goals:
  - (Norway) Knut Hovel Heiaas, Drøbak/Frogn
  - (Norway) Geir Holthe, Ranheim
- 18 goals:
  - (Norway) Sezan Ismailovski, Groruddalen
- 17 goals:
  - (Norway) Bjørn Inge Rødfoss, Eidsvold Turn
  - (Norway) Kjetil Bøe, Flekkerøy
  - (Norway) Jarle Wee, Vard
- 16 goals:
  - (Norway) Jo Sondre Aas, Rosenborg 2
