= Christian Bwamy =

Kenyan footballer (born 1989)

Personal information
- Full name: Christian Bwamy
- Date of birth: 30 November 1989 (age 36)
- Place of birth: Kenya
- Positions: Midfielder; forward

Senior career*
Years	Team	Apps	(Gls)
- Gor Mahia FC
2007	Follo FK	20+	(15)
2011	Valdres FK	21	(11)
2012–2013	IF Fram Larvik	50	(24)
	Follo FK	65+	(20+)
2018–2019	Bærum SK 2	4	(0)

International career
2013–2015	Kenya	5	(1)
- * Club domestic league appearances and goals

Christian Bwamy (born 30 November 1989) is a Kenyan retired footballer.

Bwamy played for Gor-Mahia F.C. in the Kenyan Premier League in 2007 before moving to Follo FK in the Norwegian Second Division in 2008.

Bwamy retired from professional football in 2015 due to injury.

== Career ==
Bwamy first came to the limelight during his teenage year and was a regular for Mathare Youth sports association (MYSA) U13-U16 teams that frequently featured in the Norway Cup.

In 2007, Bwamy Who captained the Jamhuri High School team in the Nairobi schools championships reached the finals which caught the attention of Kenyan Big Clubs, and was signed to Kenyan premier league giants Gor-Mahia that same year where he featured during the second leg of the 2007 season earning him praise as an exciting and intelligent talent with his immense trickery, pace and skills on the ball. Though a natural midfielder, Bwamy was often utilised as an attacking midfielder who could Attack on both sides, and was lethal in country attacking formations. After the end of the 2007 season with Bwamy finishing his high school studies he was signed back by his boyhood club Mathare United Who had won the premier league the same year.

Bwamy never played a match for Mathare United, and after a partnership between Follo FK and MYSA/Mathare United saw Bwamy leave for Norway in early 2008. Bwamy spent the rest of his career in Norway with Follo FK in 2009 gaining promotion to the top league in Norway while scoring 9 goals and featuring in the Follo team that lost the Norwegian cup final to Strømsgodset in 2010. In 2011 Bwamy signed for Valdres FK for the 2011 season and IF Fram Larvik for 2 seasons in 2012 to 2013 seasons returning to Follo Fk and helping the Club gain promotion back to the OBOS ligaen in 2014 with 15 goals and double figure assists which made the Kenya fotball federation notice him and earn call ups to the Harambee stars. Bwamy got injured at the end of the 2014 season while featuring for the Kenya national team. Bwamy had 5 caps for Kenya scoring 1 goal.

In 2015, he started studying law due to injury and became a lawyer full-time by 2019.

Bwamy made his debut for Kenya as an 88th-minute substitute against Nigeria in 2013.
