= 2006 Norwegian First Division =

1. divisjon
- Season: 2006
- Dates: 9 April – 5 November
- Champions: Strømsgodset
- Promoted: Strømsgodset; Aalesund
- Relegated: Pors Grenland; Manglerud Star; Follo; Hødd
- Matches: 240
- Goals: 806 (3.36 per match)
- Top goalscorer: Mattias Andersson (19 goals)

The 2006 1. divisjon season (referred to as Adeccoligaen for sponsorship reasons) was a Norwegian second-tier football season. The season kicked off on 9 April 2006, with eleven rounds being played before the World Cup break on 5 June. The league resumed on 2 July and the final round was played on 5 November 2006.

Strømsgodset were promoted to the Tippeligaen as First Division winners, along with Aalesund who finished second. Strømsgodset will be playing in the top division for the first time since 2001. Aalesund, meanwhile, return to Tippeligaen after being relegated in 2005.

== League table ==
Pos	Team	Pld	W	D	L	GF	GA	GD	Pts	Promotion or relegation
1	Strømsgodset (C, P)	30	20	5	5	68	36	+32	65	Promotion to Tippeligaen
2	Aalesund (P)	30	17	9	4	71	35	+36	60	Promotion to Tippeligaen
3	Bryne	30	14	10	6	52	44	+8	52	Qualification for the promotion play-offs (Note: The third-placed team in the first division and the 12th-placed team in Tippeligaen meet in a playoff at the end of the season.)
4	Hønefoss	30	15	6	9	64	47	+17	51	
5	Bodø/Glimt	30	14	7	9	65	49	+16	49	
6	Sogndal	30	11	11	8	43	41	+2	44	
7	Kongsvinger	30	11	10	9	39	42	−3	43	
8	Moss	30	11	7	12	61	46	+15	40	
9	Haugesund	30	11	5	14	40	37	+3	38	
10	Sparta Sarpsborg	30	11	6	13	44	56	−12	37 (Note: Sparta Sarpsborg have been deducted 2 points.)	
11	Løv-Ham	30	8	11	11	38	40	−2	35	
12	Tromsdalen	30	8	11	11	48	52	−4	35	
13	Pors Grenland (R)	30	10	5	15	51	65	−14	35	Relegation to Second Division
14	Manglerud Star (R)	30	7	7	16	47	79	−32	28	Relegation to Second Division
15	Follo (R)	30	6	7	17	46	76	−30	25	Relegation to Second Division
16	Hødd (R)	30	4	7	19	29	61	−32	19	Relegation to Second Division

Source: nifs.no
(C) Champions; (P) Promoted; (R) Relegated

== Results ==
Home \ Away	AAL	B/G	BFK	FOL	FKH	ILH	HBK	KIL	LØV	MS	MOS	PRS	SDL	SAR	SIF	TUIL
Aalesund	—	1–1	0–2	5–0	2–1	3–0	5–3	3–3	2–1	1–1	2–0	2–0	2–0	6–2	3–1	2–2
Bodø/Glimt	0–2	—	2–3	3–2	4–1	5–1	2–1	5–0	1–0	5–1	5–5	4–2	2–2	1–0	0–3	4–2
Bryne	2–1	2–2	—	4–2	0–2	0–0	3–3	2–0	1–0	1–1	1–5	2–0	2–1	1–1	3–2	0–3
Follo	3–3	4–2	2–5	—	0–1	3–1	0–2	2–3	3–2	5–1	1–3	3–2	0–0	0–3	0–4	1–2
Haugesund	0–1	1–1	1–2	1–0	—	1–0	1–2	1–1	3–0	4–0	0–4	6–1	2–0	0–1	0–2	2–1
Hødd	1–1	2–3	0–2	2–2	0–2	—	0–2	0–0	1–1	2–0	2–1	2–1	1–3	0–3	3–5	1–1
Hønefoss	3–0	3–1	4–1	6–0	2–1	3–0	—	1–4	2–1	1–2	0–0	1–1	4–0	3–1	1–2	1–1
Kongsvinger	0–5	3–0	1–1	2–0	0–2	0–1	2–0	—	0–0	3–0	1–0	3–1	1–1	0–1	2–2	2–2
Løv-Ham	0–1	3–2	0–0	5–1	1–1	1–0	0–3	1–1	—	5–1	0–3	2–0	2–1	0–0	1–3	0–0
Manglerud Star	1–1	0–3	3–4	3–3	2–1	3–1	2–2	0–1	2–2	—	3–2	4–3	1–2	1–2	0–2	4–2
Moss	0–5	1–1	0–0	1–2	1–1	4–1	7–3	1–2	1–1	3–1	—	4–0	0–2	4–1	3–1	6–2
Pors Grenland	1–5	1–2	2–1	2–2	4–3	2–1	2–3	2–2	2–0	6–1	0–0	—	3–1	2–0	0–2	3–1
Sogndal	2–2	0–0	2–0	2–2	2–1	2–1	1–1	2–0	1–3	2–2	1–0	2–3	—	2–2	1–1	3–0
Sarpsborg	1–1	0–4	3–6	2–0	1–0	3–2	1–0	3–0	2–2	2–4	2–0	1–2	2–3	—	3–7	0–0
Strømsgodset	3–2	2–0	0–0	3–2	2–0	1–1	5–1	2–0	2–2	2–1	1–0	3–1	0–1	2–1	—	2–1
Tromsdalen	1–2	1–0	1–1	1–1	0–0	3–2	1–3	1–2	0–2	6–2	4–2	2–2	1–1	3–0	3–1	—

Source: NIFS (in Norwegian)
Legend: Blue = home team win; Yellow = draw; Red = away team win.

== Top goalscorers ==
Rank	Player	Club	Goals
1	(Sweden) Mattias Andersson	Strømsgodset	19
2	(Norway) Håvard Sakariassen	Bryne	18
3	(Norway) Mohammed Ahamed	Tromsdalen	15
3	(Norway) Thomas Sørum	Manglerud Star	15
5	(Brazil) Dedé Anderson	Aalesund	14
5	(Norway) Tore Andreas Gundersen	Kongsvinger	14
5	(Norway) Lars Lafton	Hønefoss	14
5	(Norway) Ørjan Låstad	Løv-Ham	14
9	(Costa Rica) Randall Brenes	Bodø/Glimt	13

- 5 players scored 12 goals.

== Relegated teams ==
These two teams were relegated from the Tippeligaen in 2005. 12th-place finishers Molde defeated Moss in the playoff to retain their spot in the highest division.

- Aalesund
- Bodø/Glimt

== Promoted teams ==
These four teams were promoted from the 2. divisjon in 2005:

- Haugesund
- Manglerud Star
- Sparta Sarpsborg
- Tromsdalen
