= Petar Rnkovic =

Norwegian footballer (born 1978)

Personal information
- Date of birth: 28 November 1978 (age 47)
- Place of birth: Drammen, Norway
- Height: 1.88 m (6 ft 2 in)
- Position: Striker

Senior career*
| Years | Team | Apps | (Gls) |
| 1998 | Åssiden IF | | |
| 1999–2002 | Birkebeineren | 62 | (27) |
| 2002–2004 | Hønefoss | 46 | (4) |
| 2002 | → KS Siglufjörður (loan) | 13 | (8) |
| 2005 | Mjøndalen | 22 | (46) |
| 2006 | Strømsgodset | 13 | (3) |
| 2007–2008 | Randaberg | 48 | (42) |
| 2009 | Mjøndalen | 20 | (5) |
| 2009 | Grays Athletic | 9 | (3) |
| 2010 | Strømsgodset | 11 | (3) |
| 2011 | Mjøndalen | 27 | (10) |
| 2012 | Breiðablik | 9 | (2) |
| 2013–2018 | Arendal | 114 | (31) |

Managerial career
- 2018: Arendal (caretaker)
- * Club domestic league appearances and goals as of 28 January 2019

Petar Rnkovic (born 28 November 1978) is a Norwegian footballer of Montenegrin descent who most recently played as a striker for Norwegian club Arendal Fotball.

== Club career ==
Rnkovic played as a goalkeeper as a youth player. In his first senior year he started playing as a right back for Åssiden IF, which then played in the Norwegian Second Division. He was then used as a right winger, then as a midfielder until he started playing as a striker in the final year of his contract with Hønefoss BK. In 2005, he signed for Mjøndalen IF and scored a massive 52 goals (46 league and six cup) in just 25 matches (22 league and three cup). He was wanted by several clubs, but eventually joined Strømsgodset IF. He was mostly used as a substitute in the season that saw them gain promotion to the Norwegian Premier League (Tippeligaen). He signed for Randaberg IL in 2007, and after two years there he joined Mjøndalen IF ahead of their return to the first division.

He signed for the Slovak Superliga club, MFK Ružomberok before the transfer deadline, but he was never eligible to play for them as the papers did not get approved by the Slovak Football Federation before the deadline. Rnkovic then signed for Grays Athletic on 22 September 2009 until 2 January 2010. He scored on his debut the same day against Stevenage Borough in a 1–1 draw, gaining international clearance just hours before kick-off. He scored his second goal for Grays in a 2–2 draw away at Barrow, before scoring the winner four days later in a 1–0 victory over Tamworth.

Rnkovic left Grays having made nine Conference appearances, scoring three goals in the process. In 2010, he rejoined his former club Strømsgodset IF, and scored twice in his third appearance for the club in a 2–0 away win at Kongsvinger IL. He scored the winning goal in the 5–4 win against Lillestrøm in the last league game of the season.

On 14 November, in the Norwegian Football Cup Final, he came on as a substitute and played the last 14 minutes of Strømsgodset's 2–0 win against Follo.

Rnkovic signed with Arendal in April 2013. In his time at the club, Rnkovic also became the caretaker manager at the club, when Morten Tandberg was fired in the summer 2018. On 2 August 2018, Steinar Pedersen was appointed as the new manager, and Rnkovic then continued as a player. Rnkovic left the club at the end of the 2018 season, at the age of 40.

== Career statistics ==
| Season | Club | Division | League | | Cup | | Total | |
| Season | Club | Division | Apps | Goals | Apps | Goals | Apps | Goals |
|---|---|---|---|---|---|---|---|---|
| 2001 | Birkebeineren | 3. divisjon | 19 | 15 | 1 | 0 | 20 | 15 |
| 2002 | Birkebeineren | 3. divisjon | 2 | 4 | 0 | 0 | 2 | 4 |
| 2002 | Siglufjörður | 2. deild karla | 13 | 8 | 1 | 0 | 14 | 8 |
| 2002 | Hønefoss | Adeccoligaen | 2 | 0 | 0 | 0 | 2 | 0 |
| 2003 | Hønefoss | Adeccoligaen | 17 | 2 | 2 | 0 | 19 | 2 |
| 2004 | Hønefoss | Adeccoligaen | 27 | 2 | 3 | 1 | 30 | 3 |
| 2005 | Mjøndalen | 3. divisjon | 22 | 46 | 3 | 6 | 25 | 52 |
| 2006 | Strømsgodset | Adeccoligaen | 13 | 3 | 1 | 2 | 14 | 5 |
| 2007 | Randaberg | 3. divisjon | 22 | 23 | 1 | 1 | 23 | 24 |
| 2008 | Randaberg | 2. divisjon | 26 | 20 | 1 | 1 | 27 | 21 |
| 2009 | Mjøndalen | Adeccoligaen | 20 | 5 | 3 | 3 | 23 | 8 |
| 2009–10 | Grays Athletic | Conference National | 9 | 3 | 1 | 0 | 10 | 3 |
| 2010 | Strømsgodset | Tippeligaen | 11 | 3 | 3 | 1 | 14 | 4 |
| 2011 | Mjøndalen | Adeccoligaen | 27 | 10 | 3 | 4 | 30 | 14 |
| 2012 | Breiðablik | Úrvalsdeild | 9 | 2 | 2 | 1 | 11 | 3 |
| 2013 | Arendal | 2. divisjon | 20 | 8 | 1 | 1 | 21 | 9 |
| 2014 | Arendal | 2. divisjon | 17 | 10 | 0 | 0 | 17 | 10 |
| 2015 | Arendal | 2. divisjon | 11 | 2 | 0 | 0 | 11 | 2 |
| 2016 | Arendal | 2. divisjon | 20 | 3 | 1 | 0 | 21 | 3 |
| 2017 | Arendal | OBOS-ligaen | 19 | 4 | 0 | 0 | 19 | 4 |
| Career Total | | | 326 | 173 | 27 | 21 | 353 | 194 |
