= 2008 Norwegian Second Division =

Norwegian football league season

The 2008 2. divisjon season was the third highest association football league for men in Norway.

26 games were played in 4 groups, with 3 points given for wins and 1 for draws. Mjøndalen, Skeid, Stavanger and Tromsdalen were promoted to the First Division. Number twelve, thirteen and fourteen were relegated to the 3. divisjon, except for the two number twelve teams with the most points. The winning teams from each of the 24 groups in the 3. divisjon each faced a winning team from another group in a playoff match, resulting in 12 playoff winners which were promoted to the 2. divisjon.

== League tables ==
=== Group 1 ===
Pos	Team	Pld	W	D	L	GF	GA	GD	Pts	Promotion or relegation
1	Mjøndalen (P)	26	17	4	5	64	34	+30	55	Promotion to First Division
2	Lørenskog	26	16	3	7	48	27	+21	51	
3	Stabæk 2	26	13	5	8	48	34	+14	44	
4	Raufoss	26	13	4	9	55	37	+18	43	
5	Drøbak/Frogn	26	12	5	9	51	40	+11	41	
6	Follo	26	10	7	9	44	35	+9	37	
7	Strømsgodset 2	26	9	7	10	56	68	−12	34	
8	Manglerud Star	26	9	5	12	48	43	+5	32	
9	Valdres	26	6	14	6	40	48	−8	32	
10	Fredrikstad 2	26	9	5	12	36	48	−12	32	
11	Strømmen	26	8	5	13	31	49	−18	29	
12	Modum (R)	26	7	5	14	34	57	−23	26	Relegation to Third Division
13	Østsiden (R)	26	6	7	13	30	52	−22	25	Relegation to Third Division
14	Sprint-Jeløy (R)	26	6	6	14	28	41	−13	24	Relegation to Third Division

(P) Promoted; (R) Relegated

=== Group 2 ===
Pos	Team	Pld	W	D	L	GF	GA	GD	Pts	Promotion or relegation
1	Skeid (P)	26	22	3	1	88	28	+60	69	Promotion to First Division
2	Ranheim	26	16	4	6	74	32	+42	52	
3	Skarbøvik	26	14	5	7	51	38	+13	47	
4	Kristiansund	26	14	2	10	56	32	+24	44	
5	Levanger	26	14	2	10	47	49	−2	44	
6	Lyn 2	26	11	5	10	61	50	+11	38	
7	Byåsen	26	11	5	10	55	51	+4	38	
8	Strindheim	26	10	7	9	49	44	+5	37	
9	Korsvoll	26	10	6	10	37	53	−16	36	
10	Kjelsås	26	9	6	11	32	41	−9	33	
11	Steinkjer	26	10	1	15	56	68	−12	31	
12	Vålerenga 2 (Note: Vålerenga 2 survived as the second best number-twelve-team.)	26	9	3	14	40	58	−18	30	
13	KIL/Hemne (R)	26	3	3	20	33	82	−49	12	Relegation to Third Division
14	Groruddalen (R)	26	2	2	22	23	76	−53	8	Relegation to Third Division

(P) Promoted; (R) Relegated

=== Group 3 ===
Pos	Team	Pld	W	D	L	GF	GA	GD	Pts	Promotion or relegation
1	Stavanger (Note: 2 points deducted?) (P)	26	20	3	3	63	23	+40	61	Promotion to First Division
2	Randaberg	26	17	5	4	68	29	+39	56	
3	Flekkerøy	26	13	3	10	59	42	+17	42	
4	Mandalskameratene	26	12	3	11	60	46	+14	39	
5	Fyllingen	26	11	6	9	45	51	−6	39	
6	Åsane	26	11	4	11	56	53	+3	37	
7	Vard Haugesund	26	10	4	12	44	48	−4	34	
8	Ålgård	26	9	6	11	47	60	−13	33	
9	Vindbjart	26	9	4	13	45	45	0	31	
10	Nest-Sotra	26	8	7	11	46	52	−6	31	
11	Fana	26	9	4	13	43	52	−9	31	
12	Lillestrøm 2 (Note: Lillestrøm 2 survived as the best number-twelve-team.)	26	8	7	11	44	56	−12	31	
13	Os (R)	26	9	3	14	32	50	−18	30	Relegation to Third Division
14	Viking 2 (R)	26	3	7	16	36	81	−45	16	Relegation to Third Division

(P) Promoted; (R) Relegated

=== Group 4 ===
Pos	Team	Pld	W	D	L	GF	GA	GD	Pts	Promotion or relegation
1	Tromsdalen (P)	26	17	5	4	64	24	+40	56	Promotion to First Division
2	Ullensaker/Kisa	26	16	7	3	68	26	+42	55	
3	Tønsberg	26	17	4	5	75	35	+40	55	
4	Pors Grenland	26	15	6	5	62	41	+21	51	
5	Bærum	26	15	1	10	62	39	+23	46	
6	Asker	26	14	2	10	58	52	+6	44	
7	Rosenborg 2 (Note: 2 points deducted?)	26	13	3	10	69	51	+18	40	
8	Mo	26	11	3	12	54	45	+9	36	
9	Skjetten	26	10	4	12	52	53	−1	34	
10	Eidsvold Turn	26	9	4	13	50	55	−5	31	
11	Tromsø 2	26	8	3	15	35	62	−27	27	
12	Senja (R)	26	6	2	18	36	92	−56	20	Relegation to Third Division
13	Skarp (R)	26	5	0	21	28	83	−55	15	Relegation to Third Division
14	Lofoten (R)	26	3	2	21	35	90	−55	11	Relegation to Third Division

(P) Promoted; (R) Relegated

== Top goalscorers ==
- 27 goals:
  - (Norway) Armin Sistek, Asker
  - (Norway) Eirik Soltvedt, Ull/Kisa
- 22 goals:
  - (Norway) Kim Nysted, Skeid
- 20 goals:
  - (Norway) Mato Grubisic, Skjetten
- 19 goals:
  - (Norway) Kim Larsen, Tønsberg
  - (Norway) Stian Nikodemussen, Tønsberg
  - (Norway) Petar Rnkovic, Randaberg
  - (Norway) Jarle Wee, Vard
- 17 goals:
  - (Norway) Eirik Lamøy, Tromsdalen
  - (Norway) Kim Rune Hellesund, Nest-Sotra
  - (Norway) Mostafa Abdellaoue, Skeid
