= 2002 Norwegian First Division =

1. divisjon
- Season: 2002
- Dates: 14 April – 27 October
- Champions: Tromsø
- Promoted: Tromsø; Aalesund
- Relegated: Åsane; Tromsdalen; Lørenskog; Tollnes
- Matches played: 240
- Goals scored: 860 (3.58 per match)
- Top goalscorer: Morten Gamst Pedersen (18 goals)

The 2002 1. divisjon, Norway's second-tier football league, began play on 14 April 2002 and ended on 27 October 2002. The league was contested by 16 teams, and the top two teams won promotion to Tippeligaen, while the third placed played a promotion-playoff against the 12th-placed team in Tippeligaen to win promotion. The bottom four teams were relegated to the 2. divisjon.

Tromsø and Aalesund won promotion to Tippeligaen, while Ham-Kam lost the promotion-playoff against Bryne. Åsane, Tromsdalen, Lørenskog and Tollnes was relegated to the 2. divisjon.

== League table ==
Pos	Team	Pld	W	D	L	GF	GA	GD	Pts	Promotion or relegation
1	Tromsø (C, P)	30	21	4	5	78	36	+42	67	Promotion to Tippeligaen
2	Aalesund (P)	30	19	7	4	77	26	+51	64	Promotion to Tippeligaen
3	Sandefjord	30	18	6	6	65	38	+27	60	Qualification for the promotion play-offs
4	Hønefoss	30	18	4	8	64	36	+28	58	
5	Strømsgodset	30	17	4	9	72	51	+21	55	
6	Raufoss	30	17	3	10	71	50	+21	54	
7	Hødd	30	16	4	10	50	41	+9	52	
8	HamKam	30	11	8	11	60	47	+13	41	
9	Haugesund	30	11	7	12	46	59	−13	40	
10	Oslo Øst	30	11	5	14	59	71	−12	38	
11	Ørn-Horten	30	7	8	15	38	69	−31	29	
12	Skeid	30	7	7	16	31	48	−17	28	
13	Åsane (R)	30	8	4	18	41	59	−18	28	Relegation to Second Division
14	Tromsdalen (R)	30	8	3	19	40	65	−25	27	Relegation to Second Division
15	Lørenskog (R)	30	5	5	20	31	72	−41	20	Relegation to Second Division
16	Tollnes (R)	30	6	1	23	37	92	−55	19	Relegation to Second Division

Source: nifs.no
Rules for classification: 1) points; 2) goal difference; 3) number of goals scored.
(C) Champions; (P) Promoted; (R) Relegated

== Results ==
Home \ Away	AAL	HAM	FKH	ILH	HBK	LØR	ØST	RIL	SAN	SKD	SIF	TOL	TUIL	TRO	ÅSF	ØRN
Aalesund	—	1–1	7–0	0–1	2–1	3–0	1–1	4–1	5–1	3–0	4–0	6–0	4–0	4–2	4–1	6–1
HamKam	1–2	—	0–1	3–0	2–3	1–1	2–2	5–3	2–2	2–2	3–1	6–0	2–0	0–2	2–0	2–2
Haugesund	1–3	2–2	—	0–0	2–3	1–1	4–3	1–2	1–1	2–0	0–4	4–0	1–0	2–3	2–2	3–0
Hødd	0–1	1–3	4–1	—	2–1	7–0	4–1	3–2	2–1	3–3	0–2	1–0	0–1	0–3	1–0	5–2
Hønefoss	0–0	2–1	0–1	0–0	—	3–0	3–1	3–0	2–1	1–2	0–0	6–3	1–1	1–0	7–2	2–0
Lørenskog	1–4	0–3	0–2	1–2	1–2	—	1–3	1–4	3–3	1–2	1–5	0–2	2–1	1–1	1–0	2–1
Oslo Øst	1–2	3–1	2–0	0–2	0–3	4–3	—	2–1	0–5	1–0	1–1	5–2	3–4	2–2	3–0	5–1
Raufoss	3–3	2–1	3–0	3–1	3–2	2–0	6–1	—	0–3	1–2	3–1	4–1	1–1	4–3	2–2	3–1
Sandefjord	0–0	2–1	2–2	3–0	2–0	4–2	3–0	2–1	—	1–0	0–2	2–0	7–1	3–2	3–2	3–0
Skeid	1–1	1–2	1–2	1–2	0–2	1–1	2–3	2–0	0–1	—	2–0	0–3	0–2	1–1	1–1	1–0
Strømsgodset	2–0	3–2	2–2	4–3	3–0	2–0	5–4	1–2	4–2	4–2	—	2–0	4–1	2–3	0–2	2–3
Tollnes	0–2	3–1	1–2	0–1	2–4	2–1	5–6	0–6	0–4	0–4	0–4	—	2–1	1–2	2–1	2–3
Tromsdalen	1–2	1–1	4–1	0–1	1–2	3–0	3–1	1–2	1–2	2–0	2–4	4–2	—	2–5	1–2	1–2
Tromsø	2–1	2–4	5–1	3–0	3–1	2–1	3–0	2–1	4–0	3–0	4–2	5–0	3–0	—	3–2	4–0
Åsane	2–1	1–4	0–4	2–4	1–3	1–2	2–1	1–3	0–0	3–0	1–2	2–1	3–0	0–1	—	5–0
Ørn-Horten	1–1	2–0	4–1	0–0	0–6	1–3	0–0	0–3	1–2	0–0	4–4	3–3	5–0	0–0	1–0	—

Source: NIFS (in Norwegian)
Legend: Blue = home team win; Yellow = draw; Red = away team win.
