= Morten Eriksen =

Norwegian football striker (born 1983)

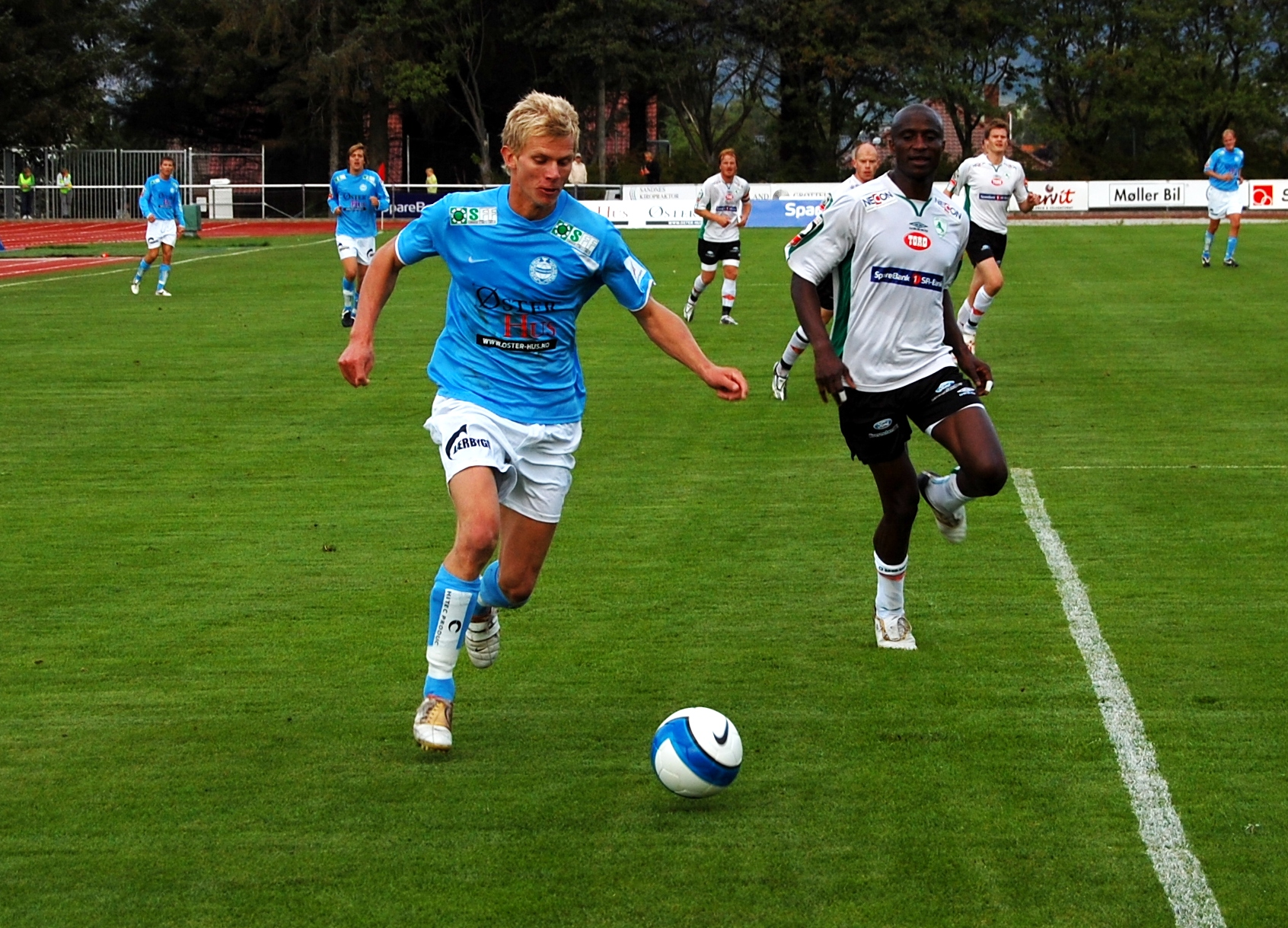

Personal information
- Full name: Morten Eriksen
- Date of birth: 26 April 1983 (age 43)
- Place of birth: Kristiansand, Norway
- Height: 1.84 m (6 ft 0 in)
- Position: Striker

Team information
- Current team: Sola
- Number: 9

Senior career*
| Years | Team | Apps | (Gls) |
| 2008–2011 | Sandnes Ulf | 111 | (60) |
| 2012 | Sandnes Ulf | 2 | (0) |
| 2012– | Sola | 87 | (65) |
- * Club domestic league appearances and goals as of 6 May 2021

Morten Eriksen (born 26 April 1983) is a Norwegian football striker who currently plays for Sola.

== Career ==
Eriksen retired after the 2011 season, but made a comeback a few months later in 2012.

== Career statistics ==
As of 6 May 2021

| Club | Season | League | | | Cup | | Total | |
| Club | Season | Division | Apps | Goals | Apps | Goals | Apps | Goals |
|---|---|---|---|---|---|---|---|---|
| Sandnes Ulf | 2008 | 1. divisjon | 29 | 4 | 1 | 2 | 30 | 6 |
| Sandnes Ulf | 2009 | 2. divisjon | 26 | 27 | 1 | 2 | 27 | 29 |
| Sandnes Ulf | 2010 | 1. divisjon | 26 | 14 | 3 | 1 | 29 | 15 |
| Sandnes Ulf | 2011 | 1. divisjon | 30 | 15 | 3 | 1 | 33 | 16 |
| Sandnes Ulf | Total | | 111 | 60 | 8 | 6 | 119 | 66 |
| Sandnes Ulf | 2012 | Eliteserien | 2 | 0 | 0 | 0 | 2 | 0 |
| Sola | 2012 | 3. divisjon | 7 | 8 | 0 | 0 | 7 | 8 |
| Sola | 2013 | 4. divisjon | 22 | 19 | 2 | 1 | 24 | 20 |
| Sola | 2014 | 3. divisjon | 17 | 18 | 4 | 4 | 21 | 22 |
| Sola | 2015 | 2. divisjon | 1 | 0 | 0 | 0 | 1 | 0 |
| Sola | 2016 | 2. divisjon | 6 | 4 | 0 | 0 | 6 | 4 |
| Sola | 2017 | 3. divisjon | 16 | 8 | 0 | 0 | 16 | 8 |
| Sola | 2018 | 3. divisjon | 11 | 7 | 1 | 0 | 12 | 7 |
| Sola | 2019 | 2. divisjon | 7 | 1 | 0 | 0 | 7 | 1 |
| Sola | Total | | 87 | 65 | 7 | 5 | 94 | 70 |
| Career total | | | 200 | 125 | 15 | 11 | 215 | 136 |
