= Christian Petersen =

Christian Petersen may refer to:

- Christian Petersen (politician) (1801–1875), Norwegian politician
- Christian Petersen (sculptor) (1885–1961), Danish-born American sculptor and university teacher
- Christian Petersen (ice hockey) (1937–2009), Norwegian ice hockey player
- Christian G. Petersen, footballer
- Christian T. Petersen, game designer
