= Benjamin Dahl Hagen =

Norwegian footballer (born 1988)

Personal information
- Full name: Benjamin Dahl Hagen
- Date of birth: 9 January 1988 (age 38)
- Place of birth: Norway
- Position: Defender

Team information
- Current team: Ski

Youth career
- Oppegård

Senior career*
| Years | Team | Apps | (Gls) |
| 2006–2011 | Follo | | |
| 2011–2013 | Vålerenga | 19 | (0) |
| 2012 | → Fredrikstad (loan) | 17 | (2) |
| 2013 | Follo | 27 | (0) |
| 2014– | Ski | | |
- * Club domestic league appearances and goals as of 22 November 2013

Benjamin Dahl Hagen (born 9 January 1988) is a Norwegian football defender who plays for Ski IL. He previously played for Fredrikstad and Vålerenga in Tippeligaen and Follo in Adeccoligaen.

== Career ==
Hagen signed for Follo in 2006, and played in the Norwegian Cup final in 2010. The next year he was wanted by Vålerenga and played the club's friendly match against Liverpool on 1 August 2011. He later signed with Vålerenga, and played 10 matches in Tippeligaen before he was loaned out to Fredrikstad until 1 August 2012.

In 2014, he went from Follo to the amateur club Ski IL.

== Career statistics ==
| Club | Season | Division | League | | Cup | | Total | |
| Club | Season | Division | Apps | Goals | Apps | Goals | Apps | Goals |
|---|---|---|---|---|---|---|---|---|
| 2011 | Vålerenga | Tippeligaen | 10 | 0 | 0 | 0 | 10 | 0 |
| 2012 | Fredrikstad | Tippeligaen | 17 | 2 | 2 | 0 | 19 | 2 |
| 2012 | Vålerenga | Tippeligaen | 9 | 0 | 0 | 0 | 9 | 0 |
| 2013 | Follo | Adeccoligaen | 27 | 0 | 3 | 1 | 30 | 1 |
| Career Total | | | 63 | 2 | 5 | 1 | 68 | 3 |
