= Mads Clausen (footballer) =

Norwegian footballer (born 1984)

Personal information
- Full name: Mads Erik Grytnes Clausen
- Date of birth: 10 February 1984 (age 42)
- Position: Midfielder

Youth career
- Jardar
- –2002: Stabæk

Senior career*
Years	Team	Apps	(Gls)
2003–2004	Stabæk	17	(0)
2005–2006	Follo		
2007	Jardar		
2008–2010	Follo		
- Jardar

International career
2000	Norway u-17	4	(0)
2002	Norway u-19	2	(0)
- * Club domestic league appearances and goals

Mads Clausen (born 10 February 1984) is a retired Norwegian football midfielder.

He came through the youth ranks of Jardar and Stabæk, making his senior first-tier debut for Stabæk in July 2003. He also represented Norway as a youth international. After two seasons in Stabæk he moved on to second-tier Follo, staying with them until the 2010 Norwegian Football Cup Final which Follo lost. The exception was the 2007 season which Clausen played for Jardar, where he also rounded off his career in the 2010s.
