= Jason Morrison (footballer) =

Jamaican footballer (born 1984)

Personal information
- Date of birth: 7 June 1984 (age 42)
- Place of birth: Jamaica
- Height: 1.83 m (6 ft 0 in)
- Position: Midfielder

Youth career
- 2000–2002: Village United F.C.

Senior career*
Years	Team	Apps	(Gls)
2002–2004	Village United F.C.		
2004–2007	Portmore United	32	(?)
2007–2008	White Star Woluwé	29	(3)
2008–2010	Ferencváros	43	(2)
2010	Strømsgodset	10	(0)
2011–2013	Aalesund	67	(1)
2014–2015	Humble Lions F.C	21	(4)

International career^{‡}
2005–	Jamaica	38	(1)
- * Club domestic league appearances and goals as of 9 October 2013 ‡ National team caps and goals as of 8 December 2012

Jason Morrison (born 7 June 1984) is a retired Jamaican footballer who played as a midfielder. He played over 10 years for Jamaica and clubs in England, Belgium, Hungary and Norway.

== Career ==
Morrison's first professional club was Village United in the top flight Jamaica National Premier League. He signed for Portmore United in 2004 and formed part of their league and cup winning squad that season. After a successful month-long trial with Sheffield United in December 2006, Morrison was sent to their feeder team, White Star Woluwe in Belgium.

After three years of playing in Belgium, Morrison would have qualified for Belgian nationality and thus be eligible to play in the English league. Morrison was transferred to Hungarian partner club, Ferencvárosi TC, in 2008. In August 2010 Morrison signed with Strømsgodset IF in Norway. He helped Strømsgodset qualify for the 2010 Norwegian Football Cup Final, scoring the first goal in extra time against Odd Grenland in the semi-final.

Morrison signed with Norwegian Tippeligaen side Aalesunds FK in 2011. After he missed the 16 May match against Brann due to shortness of breath, the doctors diagnosed him with blood clot which made him unavailable for the rest of the 2013 season. In July 2013, Aalesund and Morrison agreed mutual termination of his contract that lasted till the end of the 2014 season.

== International career ==
Morrison has been selected in numerous Jamaica squads. Morrison featured in the 2008 Caribbean Championship and 2009 Gold Cup for Jamaica.

== Career statistics ==
As of 9 October 2013

Season	Club	Division	League		Cup		Total	
Season	Club	Division	Apps	Goals	Apps	Goals	Apps	Goals
2010	Strømsgodset	Tippeligaen	10	0	3	1	13	1
2011	Aalesund	Tippeligaen	23	0	3	0	26	0
2012	Aalesund	Tippeligaen	23	0	3	1	26	1
2013	Aalesund	Tippeligaen	6	0	0	0	6	0
Career Total			62	0	9	2	71	2

== Honours ==
=== Jamaica ===
- Caribbean Cup:
  - Winner (1): 2008

=== Club ===
Portmore United

- CFU Club Championship:
  - 2005
- Jamaica National Premier League
  - 2005
- JFF Champions Cup
  - 2005

Ferencvárosi TC

- Hungarian National Championship II (1):
  - 2008–09

Strømsgodset IF

- Norwegian Football Cup:
  - 2010

Aalesunds

- Norwegian Football Cup:
  - 2011
