= Krister Aunan =

Norwegian footballer (born 1987)

Personal information
- Date of birth: 25 December 1987 (age 38)
- Place of birth: Stavanger, Norway
- Height: 1.79 m (5 ft 10 1/2 in)
- Position: Defender

Team information
- Current team: Randaberg

Youth career
- Vidar
- Madla

Senior career*
Years	Team	Apps	(Gls)
2004–2009	Randaberg		
2010–2012	Strømsgodset	33	(1)
2012	→ Bærum (loan)	8	(0)
2013	Vidar		
2014–	Randaberg		
- * Club domestic league appearances and goals as of 16 April 2014 ‡ National team caps and goals as of 16 April 2014

Krister Aunan (born 25 December 1987) is a Norwegian football defender who currently plays for 3. divisjon side Randaberg IL.

He hails from Stavanger and played youth football for FK Vidar and Madla IL. In 2004, he was in the senior squad of Randaberg IL. Ahead of the 2010 season he signed a three-year contract with first-tier club Strømsgodset IF. He made his first-tier debut in March 2010 against Kongsvinger.

In parts of 2012 he played for Bærum SK on loan. In 2013, he went back to Vidar. He rejoined Randaberg in 2014.
