= Nicolai Skoglund =

Norwegian footballer (born 2003)

Personal information
- Full name: Nicolai Alexander Georgsen Skoglund
- Date of birth: 16 May 2003 (age 23)
- Height: 1.88 m (6 ft 2 in)
- Position: Forward

Team information
- Current team: Follo
- Number: 11

Youth career
- –2012: Nordby
- 2012–2015: Asia Pacific
- 2015–2018: British International School
- 2019–2023: Sporting CP

Senior career*
Years	Team	Apps	(Gls)
2023–2024	Doxa Katokopias	14	(0)
2024	Sarpsborg II	11	(7)
2025–	Follo	39	(6)

International career^{‡}
2018	Norway U15	5	(1)
2019	Norway U16	11	(6)
2020	Norway U17	3	(0)
2021	Norway U18	1	(0)
2022	Norway U19	1	(0)
- * Club domestic league appearances and goals as of 3 November 2026 ‡ National team caps and goals as of 11 December 2023

Nicolai Skoglund (born 3 January 2003) is a Norwegian footballer who plays as a forward for Norwegian Second Division side Follo.

Hailing from Vinterbro in Ås, Skoglund started playing football as a child in the local club Nordby. When he was 12 years old, the family moved to Hong Kong where his father had a job offer. Skoglund played for Asia Pacific Soccer Club, until 2015 when he was offered to attend British International School in Phuket, Thailand. Skoglund accepted, leaving the rest of his family behind in Hong Kong. When his school team participated in the 2017 Iber Cup, Skoglund was scouted by several Portuguese elite teams. The Skoglund family moved to Lisbon in 2018. Skoglund praised the football culture abroad.

Skoglund joined the youth section of Sporting CP in 2019. He made it through their youth teams, reaching the U23 team. Following a lengthy hamstring injury, he returned to score several goals in the autumn of 2022. Playing for several youth international teams in Norway, he was especially noted for scoring 6 goals in 11 games for Norway U16 in 2019.

In October 2023 Skoglund joined Doxa Katokopias FC in the Cypriot First Division, making his debut against Anorthosis in the same month.
