= Espen Olsen =

Norwegian footballer (born 1979)

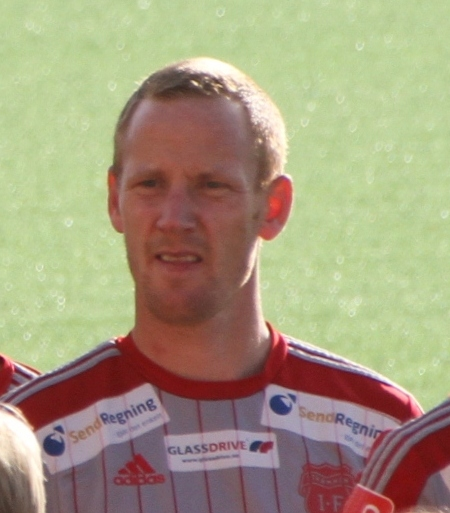
- Espen Olsen, 2012

Personal information
- Date of birth: 13 March 1979 (age 47)
- Place of birth: Oslo, Norway
- Height: 1.80 m (5 ft 11 in)
- Position: Striker

Youth career
- 1985–1998: Strømmen

Senior career*
Years	Team	Apps	(Gls)
1999–2001	Lørenskog	55	(58)
2002–2007	HamKam	166	(45)
2007	Stabæk	6	(0)
2008	→ Start (loan)	18	(9)
2008–2011	Sogndal	90	(21)
2011–2012	Strømmen	36	(7)

International career
2006	Norway	2	(0)

Managerial career
- 2013–2014: Strømmen (director of sports)
- 2015–2018: Strømmen
- 2019–: HamKam (director of sports)
- 2020: HamKam
- * Club domestic league appearances and goals as of 11 November 2012

Espen Olsen (born 13 March 1979) is a retired Norwegian footballer. He was appointed manager of Strømmen IF ahead of the 2015 season. Ahead of the 2019 season he went on to HamKam as director of sports. He played for Lørenskog, HamKam, Stabæk, Start, Sogndal and Strømmen. He also played two matches for Norway national football team, against Mexico and USA in January 2006.

== Career statistics ==
Season	Club	Division	League		Cup		Total	
Season	Club	Division	Apps	Goals	Apps	Goals	Apps	Goals
2002	HamKam	Adeccoligaen	30	6	0	0	30	6
2003	HamKam	Adeccoligaen	29	11	3	1	32	12
2004	HamKam	Tippeligaen	26	4	5	4	31	8
2005	HamKam	Tippeligaen	26	8	5	1	31	9
2006	HamKam	Tippeligaen	22	1	1	2	23	3
2007	HamKam	Adeccoligaen	19	3	0	0	19	3
2007	Stabæk	Tippeligaen	6	0	0	0	6	0
2008	Start	Adeccoligaen	15	5	2	3	17	8
2008	Sogndal	Adeccoligaen	13	2	0	0	13	2
2009	Sogndal	Adeccoligaen	26	3	2	0	28	3
2010	Sogndal	Adeccoligaen	25	12	6	2	31	14
2011	Sogndal	Tippeligaen	12	0	4	1	16	1
2011	Strømmen	Adeccoligaen	11	3	0	0	11	3
2012	Strømmen	Adeccoligaen	25	4	2	0	27	4
Career Total			285	62	30	14	315	76
