= Tom Harald Hagen =

Norwegian football referee

- Full name: Tom Harald Hagen
- Born: 1 April 1978 (age 48)
- Other occupation: Teacher

Domestic
Years	League	Role
2006–	Eliteserien	Referee

International
Years	League	Role
2009–	UEFA	Referee

Tom Harald Hagen (born 1 April 1978) is a Norwegian football referee from Grue Municipality in Hedmark county, Norway.

== Career ==
Hagen started his career as referee in 1994. He debuted as a referee in the Eliteserien in the 21st matchday of the 2006 Tippeligaen after having refereed over 50 matches in the second highest league in Norway, the 1. divisjon. He refereed the Norwegian Cup Final between Strømsgodset and Follo. Hagen represents Grue Idrettslag and works as a teacher alongside the refereeing.

Hagen has been a FIFA referee and refereed UEFA Europa League, UEFA Euro 2012 qualification, and World Cup qualifying matches since 2009. On 19 October 2011, he refereed his first match as a UEFA Champions League referee when A.C. Milan met BATE Borisov at San Siro. He got his second Champions League match on 22 November 2011, when Basel won Oțelul Galați 3–2 in Bucharest. On 20 December 2011, it was announced that Hagen would be one of four designated fourth officials during UEFA Euro 2012 in Poland and Ukraine.

== Personal life ==
In October 2020, Hagen came out as gay.
