= 2011 Norwegian Second Division =

Association football division

The 2011 2. divisjon consists of 56 teams divided into 4 groups. Follo, Tromsdalen and Moss were relegated from the 2010 Norwegian First Division. Lillehammer avoided relegation to the 3. divisjon due to the bankruptcy of Lyn.

== League tables ==
=== Group 1 ===
Pos	Team	Pld	W	D	L	GF	GA	GD	Pts	Promotion or relegation
1	Ull/Kisa (P)	26	14	9	3	59	38	+21	51	Promotion to First Division
2	Rosenborg 2	26	14	4	8	76	56	+20	46	
3	Byåsen	26	12	8	6	65	48	+17	44	
4	Lørenskog	26	12	7	7	55	46	+9	43	
5	Kvik Halden	26	12	6	8	52	34	+18	42	
6	Nesodden	26	13	2	11	53	44	+9	41	
7	Levanger	26	12	3	11	52	45	+7	39	
8	Stabæk 2	26	11	6	9	47	46	+1	39	
9	KFUM Oslo	26	10	8	8	55	38	+17	38	
10	Moss	26	11	5	10	58	56	+2	38	
11	Nardo	26	8	5	13	43	55	−12	29	
12	Tiller (R)	26	8	3	15	41	58	−17	27	Relegation to Third Division
13	Strindheim (R)	26	5	6	15	39	68	−29	21	Relegation to Third Division
14	Steinkjer (R)	26	3	2	21	43	106	−63	11	Relegation to Third Division

Source: nifs.no
Rules for classification: 1) points; 2) goal difference; 3) number of goals scored.
(P) Promoted; (R) Relegated

=== Group 2 ===
Pos	Team	Pld	W	D	L	GF	GA	GD	Pts	Promotion or relegation
1	Bærum (P)	24	15	6	3	75	30	+45	51	Promotion to First Division
2	Kristiansund BK	24	15	3	6	55	29	+26	48	
3	Raufoss	24	13	3	8	57	41	+16	42	
4	Elverum	24	12	6	6	38	26	+12	42	
5	Brumunddal	24	12	2	10	54	43	+11	38	
6	Frigg	24	11	4	9	47	40	+7	37	
7	Valdres	24	10	3	11	42	49	−7	33	
8	Molde 2 (Note: Molde 2 were deducted 1 point for using an illegal player in the match against Valdres on 23 June 2011.)	24	9	4	11	43	53	−10	30	
9	Lillehammer	24	8	5	11	39	56	−17	29	
10	Follo	24	7	5	12	47	51	−4	26	
11	Aalesund 2	24	7	5	12	36	59	−23	26	
12	Jevnaker (R)	24	7	1	16	42	64	−22	22	Relegation to Third Division
13	Herd (R)	24	4	5	15	32	66	−34	17	Relegation to Third Division
14	Manglerud Star (Note: Manglerud Star were bankrupted 4 April 2011, and will not play any matches.) (R)	0	0	0	0	0	0	0	0	Relegation to Third Division

Source: nifs.no
Rules for classification: 1) points; 2) goal difference; 3) number of goals scored.
(P) Promoted; (R) Relegated

=== Group 3 ===
Pos	Team	Pld	W	D	L	GF	GA	GD	Pts	Promotion or relegation
1	Notodden (P)	26	22	2	2	79	23	+56	68	Promotion to First Division
2	Vard Haugesund	26	13	5	8	57	35	+22	44	
3	Vindbjart	26	12	5	9	51	54	−3	41	
4	Åsane	26	11	7	8	51	42	+9	40	
5	Vidar	26	11	4	11	40	48	−8	37	
6	Odd Grenland 2	26	10	6	10	36	37	−1	36	
7	Flekkerøy	26	10	5	11	36	38	−2	35	
8	Ålgård	26	8	10	8	45	43	+2	34	
9	Nest-Sotra	26	9	6	11	51	45	+6	33	
10	Mandalskameratene	26	8	7	11	45	59	−14	31	
11	Pors Grenland	26	8	5	13	42	53	−11	29	
12	Viking 2 (R)	26	7	8	11	36	55	−19	29	Relegation to Third Division
13	Førde (R)	26	7	5	14	43	50	−7	26	Relegation to Third Division
14	Austevoll (R)	26	7	3	16	49	79	−30	24	Relegation to Third Division

Source: nifs.no
Rules for classification: 1) points; 2) goal difference; 3) number of goals scored.
(P) Promoted; (R) Relegated

=== Group 4 ===
Pos	Team	Pld	W	D	L	GF	GA	GD	Pts	Promotion or relegation
1	Tromsdalen (P)	26	20	2	4	105	28	+77	62	Promotion to First Division
2	Skeid	26	16	4	6	75	38	+37	52	
3	Strømsgodset 2	26	15	3	8	88	65	+23	48	
4	Ørn-Horten	26	15	3	8	50	38	+12	48	
5	Senja	26	14	2	10	57	66	−9	44	
6	FK Tønsberg	26	13	3	10	48	50	−2	42	
7	Kjelsås	26	11	7	8	61	42	+19	40	
8	Mjølner	26	12	4	10	39	32	+7	40	
9	Tromsø 2	26	10	5	11	37	51	−14	35	
10	Vålerenga 2	26	7	6	13	58	65	−7	27	
11	Fram Larvik	26	7	6	13	34	56	−22	27	
12	Harstad (R)	26	7	4	15	41	58	−17	25	Relegation to Third Division
13	Hasle-Løren (R)	26	2	8	16	39	87	−48	14	Relegation to Third Division
14	Skarp (R)	26	2	5	19	29	85	−56	11	Relegation to Third Division

Source: nifs.no
Rules for classification: 1) points; 2) goal difference; 3) number of goals scored.
(P) Promoted; (R) Relegated
