= 2009 Norwegian Second Division =

Norwegian football league season

The 2009 2. divisjon season was the third highest football (soccer) league for men in Norway.

26 games were played in 4 groups, with 3 points given for wins and 1 for draws. Strømmen, Follo, Sandnes Ulf and Ranheim were promoted to the 2010 Norwegian First Division. Number twelve, thirteen and fourteen were relegated to the 3. divisjon, except for the two number twelve teams with the most points. The winning teams from each of the 24 groups in the 3. divisjon each faced a winning team from another group in a playoff match, resulting in 12 playoff winners which were promoted to the 2. divisjon.

== League tables ==
=== Group 1 ===
| Pos | Team | Pld | W | D | L | GF | GA | GD | Pts | Promotion or relegation |
|---|---|---|---|---|---|---|---|---|---|---|
| 1 | Strømmen (P) | 26 | 20 | 3 | 3 | 77 | 31 | +46 | 63 | Promotion to First Division |
| 2 | Pors Grenland | 26 | 18 | 3 | 5 | 76 | 44 | +32 | 57 | |
| 3 | FK Tønsberg | 26 | 17 | 2 | 7 | 81 | 39 | +42 | 53 | |
| 4 | KFUM | 26 | 14 | 6 | 6 | 55 | 34 | +21 | 48 | |
| 5 | Flekkerøy | 26 | 14 | 4 | 8 | 70 | 51 | +19 | 46 | |
| 6 | Vindbjart | 26 | 12 | 4 | 10 | 47 | 47 | 0 | 40 | |
| 7 | Start 2 | 26 | 10 | 3 | 13 | 50 | 53 | −3 | 33 | |
| 8 | Fram Larvik | 26 | 10 | 3 | 13 | 47 | 69 | −22 | 33 | |
| 9 | Vålerenga 2 | 26 | 8 | 6 | 12 | 58 | 67 | −9 | 30 | |
| 10 | Ullensaker/Kisa | 26 | 8 | 4 | 14 | 49 | 53 | −4 | 28 | |
| 11 | Eidsvold Turn | 26 | 6 | 10 | 10 | 38 | 50 | −12 | 28 | |
| 12 | Lillestrøm 2 (R) | 26 | 7 | 2 | 17 | 34 | 64 | −30 | 23 | Relegation to Third Division |
| 13 | Mandalskameratene (R) | 26 | 6 | 4 | 16 | 33 | 60 | −27 | 22 | Relegation to Third Division |
| 14 | Skjetten (R) | 26 | 2 | 6 | 18 | 22 | 75 | −53 | 12 | Relegation to Third Division |

(P) Promoted; (R) Relegated

=== Group 2 ===
| Pos | Team | Pld | W | D | L | GF | GA | GD | Pts | Promotion or relegation |
|---|---|---|---|---|---|---|---|---|---|---|
| 1 | Follo (P) | 26 | 19 | 3 | 4 | 59 | 25 | +34 | 60 | Promotion to First Division |
| 2 | Kristiansund | 26 | 14 | 4 | 8 | 69 | 44 | +25 | 46 | |
| 3 | Hødd | 26 | 14 | 4 | 8 | 54 | 37 | +17 | 46 | |
| 4 | Rosenborg 2 | 26 | 14 | 4 | 8 | 63 | 48 | +15 | 46 | |
| 5 | Lørenskog | 26 | 13 | 6 | 7 | 55 | 38 | +17 | 45 | |
| 6 | Byåsen | 26 | 11 | 7 | 8 | 52 | 38 | +14 | 40 | |
| 7 | Molde 2 | 26 | 12 | 2 | 12 | 50 | 47 | +3 | 38 | |
| 8 | Skarbøvik | 26 | 10 | 4 | 12 | 45 | 45 | 0 | 34 | |
| 9 | Strindheim | 26 | 11 | 1 | 14 | 41 | 48 | −7 | 34 | |
| 10 | Nardo | 26 | 8 | 9 | 9 | 37 | 39 | −2 | 33 | |
| 11 | Levanger | 26 | 10 | 2 | 14 | 26 | 58 | −32 | 32 | |
| 12 | Steinkjer (Note: Steinkjer survived as the best number-twelve-team.) | 26 | 8 | 5 | 13 | 47 | 70 | −23 | 29 | |
| 13 | Drøbak/Frogn (R) | 26 | 6 | 2 | 18 | 45 | 64 | −19 | 20 | Relegation to Third Division |
| 14 | Ullern (R) | 26 | 4 | 3 | 19 | 24 | 66 | −42 | 15 | Relegation to Third Division |

(P) Promoted; (R) Relegated

=== Group 3 ===
| Pos | Team | Pld | W | D | L | GF | GA | GD | Pts | Promotion or relegation |
|---|---|---|---|---|---|---|---|---|---|---|
| 1 | Sandnes Ulf (P) | 26 | 19 | 4 | 3 | 88 | 28 | +60 | 61 | Promotion to First Division |
| 2 | Vard Haugesund | 26 | 17 | 5 | 4 | 64 | 36 | +28 | 56 | |
| 3 | Ålgård | 26 | 15 | 5 | 6 | 55 | 34 | +21 | 50 | |
| 4 | Åsane | 26 | 15 | 4 | 7 | 57 | 31 | +26 | 49 | |
| 5 | Randaberg | 26 | 14 | 4 | 8 | 60 | 39 | +21 | 46 | |
| 6 | Kopervik | 26 | 12 | 5 | 9 | 61 | 58 | +3 | 41 | |
| 7 | Strømsgodset 2 | 26 | 8 | 7 | 11 | 56 | 62 | −6 | 31 | |
| 8 | Stord | 26 | 9 | 2 | 15 | 48 | 62 | −14 | 29 | |
| 9 | Fredrikstad 2 (Note: Fredrikstad 2 was forcibly relegated since its first team was relegated to the First Division.) (R) | 26 | 8 | 5 | 13 | 46 | 69 | −23 | 29 | Relegation to Third Division |
| 10 | Nest-Sotra | 26 | 8 | 5 | 13 | 51 | 77 | −26 | 29 | |
| 11 | Fana | 26 | 8 | 4 | 14 | 47 | 66 | −19 | 28 | |
| 12 | Fyllingen (R) | 26 | 8 | 3 | 15 | 37 | 64 | −27 | 27 | Relegation to Third Division |
| 13 | Lyn 2 (R) | 26 | 5 | 6 | 15 | 39 | 49 | −10 | 21 | Relegation to Third Division |
| 14 | Drammen (R) | 26 | 5 | 3 | 18 | 30 | 64 | −34 | 18 | Relegation to Third Division |

(P) Promoted; (R) Relegated

=== Group 4 ===
| Pos | Team | Pld | W | D | L | GF | GA | GD | Pts | Promotion or relegation |
|---|---|---|---|---|---|---|---|---|---|---|
| 1 | Ranheim (P) | 26 | 17 | 4 | 5 | 64 | 21 | +43 | 55 | Promotion to First Division |
| 2 | Raufoss | 26 | 16 | 2 | 8 | 65 | 39 | +26 | 50 | |
| 3 | Asker | 26 | 15 | 4 | 7 | 63 | 31 | +32 | 49 | |
| 4 | Stabæk 2 | 26 | 13 | 6 | 7 | 53 | 37 | +16 | 45 | |
| 5 | Manglerud Star | 26 | 15 | 0 | 11 | 52 | 38 | +14 | 45 | |
| 6 | Valdres | 26 | 13 | 6 | 7 | 53 | 41 | +12 | 45 | |
| 7 | Bærum | 26 | 13 | 3 | 10 | 61 | 46 | +15 | 42 | |
| 8 | FF Lillehammer | 26 | 10 | 9 | 7 | 44 | 43 | +1 | 39 | |
| 9 | Kjelsås | 26 | 9 | 5 | 12 | 38 | 47 | −9 | 32 | |
| 10 | Tromsø 2 | 26 | 9 | 4 | 13 | 35 | 55 | −20 | 31 | |
| 11 | Mo | 26 | 6 | 10 | 10 | 40 | 55 | −15 | 28 | |
| 12 | Korsvoll (R) | 26 | 7 | 6 | 13 | 39 | 45 | −6 | 27 | Relegation to Third Division |
| 13 | Bodø/Glimt 2 (R) | 26 | 6 | 0 | 20 | 23 | 77 | −54 | 18 | Relegation to Third Division |
| 14 | Bossekop (R) | 26 | 1 | 5 | 20 | 29 | 84 | −55 | 8 | Relegation to Third Division |

(P) Promoted; (R) Relegated

== Top goalscorers ==
- 28 goals:
  - (Norway) Morten Eriksen, Sandnes Ulf
- 21 goals:
  - (Norway) Eirik Markegård, FK Tønsberg
  - (Norway) Trond Haugstad, Strømmen
  - (Senegal) Remond Mendy, Raufoss
  - (Norway) Mato Grubisic, Valdres
- 20 goals:
  - (Norway) Christian Østli, FK Tønsberg
- 19 goals:
  - (England) Christopher Joyce, Pors Grenland
- 18 goals:
  - (Norway) Øyvind L. Gausdal, Vindbjart
  - (Norway) Joakim Rudolfsen, Mo
- 17 goals:
  - (Norway) Vebjørn Svensson, FF Lillehammer
