= Ski Stadion =

Sports venue in Ski, Akershus, Norway

- Interactive map of Ski Stadion
- Location: Ski, Norway
- Coordinates: 59.718537°N 10.850768°E

Tenants
- Follo FK (football); Ski IL (track and field)

Ski Stadion is a multi-use stadium in Ski, Norway. It is currently used for track and field meets hosted by Ski IL and for association football matches, being the home ground of Follo FK.

The stadium has a capacity of approximately 2,100 spectators, with 1,400 seated places and standing room for 800.
