= 2014 Norwegian Second Division =

2. divisjon
- Season: 2014
- Champions: Jerv, Levanger, Åsane, Follo

The 2014 2. divisjon (often referred to as Oddsen-ligaen for sponsorship reasons) was a Norwegian football third-tier league. The league consisted of 56 teams divided into 4 groups of 14 teams. The winners of the four groups were promoted to the 1. divisjon, while the bottom three teams in each groups are relegated to the 3. divisjon.

The league was played as a double round-robin tournament, where all teams played 26 matches. The first round was played on 21 April 2014, while the last round was played on 25 October 2014.

== League tables ==
=== Group 1 ===
Pos	Team	Pld	W	D	L	GF	GA	GD	Pts	Promotion or relegation
1	Jerv (P)	26	17	6	3	71	29	+42	57	Promotion to First Division
2	Vindbjart	26	16	3	7	71	44	+27	51	
3	Fram Larvik	26	15	4	7	52	41	+11	49	
4	Kongsvinger	26	15	3	8	61	42	+19	48	
5	Notodden	26	15	3	8	50	42	+8	48	
6	Flekkerøy	26	11	7	8	56	45	+11	40	
7	Odd 2	26	10	7	9	65	53	+12	37	
8	Arendal	26	10	4	12	47	58	−11	34	
9	Holmen	26	8	8	10	46	72	−26	32	
10	Ørn-Horten	26	10	1	15	50	57	−7	31	
11	Strømsgodset	26	8	5	13	61	68	−7	29	
12	Pors Grenland (R)	26	7	5	14	43	50	−7	26	Relegation to Third Division
13	Asker (R)	26	5	6	15	36	50	−14	21	Relegation to Third Division
14	Birkebeineren (R)	26	2	4	20	34	82	−48	10	Relegation to Third Division

Source: nifs.no
Rules for classification: 1) points; 2) goal difference; 3) number of goals scored.
(P) Promoted; (R) Relegated

=== Group 2 ===
Pos	Team	Pld	W	D	L	GF	GA	GD	Pts	Promotion or relegation
1	Levanger (P)	26	16	6	4	64	29	+35	54	Promotion to First Division
2	Byåsen	26	16	5	5	64	40	+24	53	
3	Elverum	26	15	7	4	55	27	+28	52	
4	Raufoss	26	15	5	6	64	43	+21	50	
5	Nybergsund-Trysil	26	11	8	7	47	35	+12	41	
6	Gjøvik-Lyn	26	11	8	7	39	28	+11	41	
7	Nardo	26	10	8	8	41	42	−1	38	
8	Rødde	26	9	6	11	44	54	−10	33	
9	Brumunddal	26	8	6	12	33	38	−5	30	
10	Træff	26	7	7	12	36	43	−7	28	
11	Molde 2	26	7	5	14	40	64	−24	26	
12	Herd (R)	26	6	4	16	28	56	−28	22	Relegation to Third Division
13	Rosenborg 2 (R)	26	4	7	15	40	56	−16	19	Relegation to Third Division
14	Valders (R)	26	4	4	18	34	74	−40	16	Relegation to Third Division

Source: nifs.no
Rules for classification: 1) points; 2) goal difference; 3) number of goals scored.
(P) Promoted; (R) Relegated

=== Group 3 ===
Pos	Team	Pld	W	D	L	GF	GA	GD	Pts	Promotion or relegation
1	Åsane (P)	26	17	4	5	70	27	+43	55	Promotion to First Division
2	Egersund	26	14	6	6	48	36	+12	48	
3	Vard Haugesund	26	12	5	9	57	38	+19	41	
4	Vidar	26	11	7	8	48	40	+8	40	
5	Førde	26	10	9	7	40	42	−2	39	
6	Florø	26	9	10	7	53	49	+4	37	
7	Grorud	26	9	8	9	49	51	−2	35	
8	Stabæk 2	26	11	1	14	47	57	−10	34	
9	Fana	26	9	6	11	51	56	−5	33	
10	Lyn	26	9	5	12	42	42	0	32	
11	Fyllingsdalen	26	9	5	12	47	50	−3	32	
12	Brann 2 (R)	26	10	2	14	50	64	−14	32	Relegation to Third Division
13	Stord (R)	26	7	6	13	43	62	−19	27	Relegation to Third Division
14	Ålgård (R)	26	7	2	17	32	63	−31	23	Relegation to Third Division

Source: nifs.no
Rules for classification: 1) points; 2) goal difference; 3) number of goals scored.
(P) Promoted; (R) Relegated

=== Group 4 ===
Pos	Team	Pld	W	D	L	GF	GA	GD	Pts	Promotion or relegation
1	Follo (P)	26	21	3	2	97	16	+81	66	Promotion to First Division
2	Kjelsås	26	18	4	4	74	28	+46	58	
3	Moss	26	16	5	5	69	24	+45	53	
4	Eidsvold TF	26	13	6	7	59	34	+25	45	
5	KFUM Oslo	26	13	6	7	44	31	+13	45	
6	Finnsnes	26	14	1	11	45	41	+4	43	
7	Skeid	26	13	3	10	54	41	+13	42	
8	Harstad	26	12	3	11	46	33	+13	39	
9	Vålerenga 2	26	10	6	10	51	51	0	36	
10	Kvik Halden	26	9	4	13	37	51	−14	31	
11	Lørenskog	26	7	5	14	36	64	−28	26	
12	Drøbak-Frogn (R)	26	4	3	19	37	92	−55	15	Relegation to Third Division
13	Mo (R)	26	3	4	19	22	87	−65	13	Relegation to Third Division
14	Medkila (R)	26	2	1	23	13	91	−78	7	Relegation to Third Division

Source: nifs.no
Rules for classification: 1) points; 2) goal difference; 3) number of goals scored.
(P) Promoted; (R) Relegated
