= 2008 Norwegian First Division =

1. divisjon
- Season: 2008
- Dates: 5 April – 1 November
- Champions: Odd Grenland
- Promoted: Odd Grenland; Sandefjord; Start
- Relegated: Sandnes Ulf; Hødd
- Matches: 240
- Goals: 762 (3.18 per match)
- Top goalscorer: Péter Kovács (22 goals)

2008 Clubs

The 2008 1. divisjon season (referred to as Adeccoligaen for sponsorship reasons) began on 5 April 2008 and ended on 1 November 2008.

In 2009, the number of teams in the top tier, Tippeligaen, will expand from fourteen to sixteen. Therefore, 2008 was a transitional season, in which more teams were promoted to the top flight, and less teams relegated to the 2. divisjon, than usual. Automatic promotion was awarded to the teams finishing in the top three places in the standings. Only the two teams at the bottom of the standings were relegated to the 2. divisjon, as opposed to the regular four.

The three clubs relegated from the Tippeligaen in 2007 were Odd Grenland, Start and Sandefjord. At the conclusion of the season, all three had managed to secure promotion, with Odd Grenland being confirmed as champions of the 1. divisjon after defeating Start 3–2 in the penultimate round.

Sandnes Ulf and Hødd were relegated to the 2. divisjon after finishing in fifteenth and sixteenth place respectively. It was Sandnes Ulf's first season at the second level since 1972. Nybergsund, who had never previously played at the second level, retained their spot, finishing in eighth place.

As in previous years, there was a two-legged promotion playoff at the end of the season, this time between the fourth-placed team in the 1. divisjon (Sogndal) and the thirteenth-placed team in the Tippeligaen (Aalesund). Aalesund kept their spot in the Tippeligaen, beating Sogndal 4-1 away, 3-1 at home, and 7-2 on aggregate.

== League table ==
Pos	Team	Pld	W	D	L	GF	GA	GD	Pts	Promotion or relegation
1	Odd Grenland (C, P)	30	20	5	5	76	44	+32	65	Promotion to Tippeligaen
2	Sandefjord (P)	30	17	9	4	46	25	+21	60	Promotion to Tippeligaen
3	Start (P)	30	17	8	5	58	34	+24	59	Promotion to Tippeligaen
4	Sogndal	30	15	9	6	53	36	+17	54	Qualification for the promotion play-offs
5	Hønefoss	30	15	6	9	47	33	+14	51	
6	Notodden	30	12	10	8	55	40	+15	46	
7	Haugesund	30	11	9	10	48	47	+1	42	
8	Nybergsund	30	12	6	12	49	53	−4	42	
9	Moss	30	9	12	9	63	54	+9	39	
10	Sarpsborg Sparta	30	10	7	13	45	43	+2	37	
11	Bryne	30	10	6	14	38	53	−15	36	
12	Løv-Ham	30	9	7	14	37	45	−8	34	
13	Kongsvinger	30	8	6	16	33	58	−25	30	
14	Alta	30	8	2	20	49	66	−17	26	
15	Sandnes Ulf (R)	30	5	10	15	36	55	−19	25	Relegation to Second Division
16	Hødd (R)	30	2	8	20	29	76	−47	14	Relegation to Second Division

Source: nifs.no
Rules for classification: 1) points; 2) goal difference; 3) number of goals scored. The winner, runner-up and third place finisher in the 1. divisjon are automatically promoted to the Tippeligaen. The fourth-placed team in the 1. divisjon and the 13th-placed team in the Tippeligaen meet in a playoff at the end of the season. The two teams finishing at the bottom of the table are automatically relegated to the 2. divisjon.
(C) Champions; (P) Promoted; (R) Relegated

== Results ==
Home \ Away	ALT	BRY	HAU	ILH	HØN	KIL	LØV	MFK	NOT	NIL	ODD	SF	ULF	SSFK	SIL	IKS
Alta	—	4–1	1–0	7–2	0–2	1–2	1–3	3–0	2–3	1–2	3–7	1–1	0–1	1–0	0–2	1–2
Bryne	3–1	—	2–2	6–1	0–2	2–1	1–0	5–5	1–1	0–3	0–1	1–3	4–0	1–0	0–1	0–1
Haugesund	5–4	1–1	—	3–1	0–4	0–1	2–3	2–2	3–1	3–1	1–4	1–1	2–0	1–2	2–0	2–2
Hødd	1–2	0–1	1–2	—	0–1	2–4	1–1	1–5	0–0	2–3	1–2	0–2	1–1	2–0	0–3	0–2
Hønefoss	2–0	2–0	1–1	5–1	—	4–0	1–3	1–0	1–1	6–1	1–0	0–0	2–2	1–0	0–4	3–3
Kongsvinger	1–3	0–1	2–2	1–1	2–1	—	1–0	0–3	1–2	0–2	1–3	0–3	0–0	2–1	4–3	2–2
Løv-Ham	3–0	2–1	0–1	1–1	1–0	3–1	—	1–1	3–1	0–0	2–3	0–2	1–2	1–2	0–1	0–0
Moss	4–2	1–2	2–4	2–2	1–2	1–1	3–1	—	1–1	2–1	3–3	3–1	2–4	2–4	1–1	4–0
Notodden	5–3	7–0	1–1	5–1	3–1	4–2	0–1	2–2	—	1–0	0–0	5–0	2–1	0–5	2–3	2–3
Nybergsund	2–0	4–0	2–0	4–0	1–0	2–1	2–2	0–5	0–1	—	1–3	1–2	2–0	2–2	1–1	2–3
Odd Grenland	2–1	5–1	1–1	4–0	2–0	3–0	3–1	3–2	1–1	5–1	—	2–1	3–2	3–2	4–4	3–2
Sandefjord	2–1	1–0	0–1	2–2	0–0	2–0	4–1	3–1	1–0	1–1	3–0	—	2–1	2–0	2–0	2–1
Sandnes Ulf	2–2	1–1	2–4	1–2	1–2	1–2	1–1	1–1	0–2	2–3	0–3	0–0	—	2–1	3–0	2–2
Sarpsborg Sparta	2–3	1–1	2–1	2–1	0–1	1–1	2–1	1–2	1–1	2–2	5–1	1–1	2–1	—	2–2	0–2
Sogndal	2–1	1–0	1–0	3–1	3–1	3–0	4–0	2–2	1–1	3–1	3–2	0–0	1–1	0–1	—	0–3
Start	2–0	1–2	2–0	1–1	3–0	2–0	3–1	0–0	1–0	5–2	1–0	1–2	5–1	2–1	1–1	—

Source: NIFS (in Norwegian)
Legend: Blue = home team win; Yellow = draw; Red = away team win.

== Promotion play-offs ==
By finishing 4th, Sogndal competed in a two-legged relegation play-off against Aalesund, who finished 13th in the 2008 Tippeligaen, for the right to play in the 2009 Tippeligaen. Sogndal played at home first, decided in a draw held by the NFF. Aalesund won 7–2 on aggregate, thereby securing a new season in the Tippeligaen. Sogndal remained in the 1. divisjon.

8 November 2008
19:00 CET (UTC+1)

Sogndal	1–4	Aalesund
Bolseth 50'	Report	Arnefjord 22'; Aarøy 53'; Nadolski 61' (o.g.); Diego Silva 90+4'

Fosshaugane Campus, Sogndalsfjøra
Attendance: 3,553
Referee: Roy Helge Olsen, Fløy

12 November 2008
19:00 CET (UTC+1)

Aalesund	3–1	Sogndal
Aarøy 14', 31', 43'	Report	Håvard Flo 43'

Color Line Stadion, Ålesund
Attendance: 8,646
Referee: Terje Hauge, Olsvik

Aalesund won 7–2 on aggregate and remained in Tippeligaen.

== Top goalscorers ==
Rank	Scorer	Club	Goals
1	(Hungary) Peter Kovacs	Odd Grenland	22
2	(Norway) Kenneth Kvalheim	Moss	21
3	(Norway) Morten Fevang	Odd Grenland	15
4	(Jamaica) Fabian Taylor	Notodden	14
5	(Norway) Vegard Braaten	Alta	13
5	(Norway) Martin Wiig	Sarpsborg Sparta	13
5	(Norway) Lars Lafton	Hønefoss	13
8	(Denmark) Allan Borgvardt	Bryne	12
9	(Norway) Geir Ludvig Fevang	Start	11

Source: VG Nett

== Relegated teams ==
These three teams were relegated from the Tippeligaen in 2007:

- Odd Grenland
- Start
- Sandefjord

== Promoted teams ==
These four teams were promoted from the 2. divisjon in 2007:

- Alta
- Hødd
- Nybergsund-Trysil
- Sandnes Ulf
