= Vindbjart FK =

Norwegian football club

Vindbjart
- Full name: Vindbjart Fotballklubb
- Founded: 30 May 1896; 130 years ago
- Ground: Moseidmoen
- Chairman: Monica K. Røraas
- Coach: Stefan Gislason
- League: Third Division
- 2024: Third Division group 2, 5th of 14
Home colours	Away colours

Vindbjart Fotballklubb is a football club situated in Vennesla which is located in Vennesla Municipality in Agder county, Norway. They play in the 3. divisjon, the fourth tier in Norwegian football.

== History ==
In 1995 Vindbjart won all their matches in the 3. divisjon. They won promotion to the 2. divisjon, but were relegated in 1997. They were promoted back for the 2008 season, but were relegated in 2017. They also have child teams with boys and girls from Hunsfos, Vennesla, Kvarstein and Moseidmoen.

Some former Vindbjart-players have later played in the Norwegian top division, including Mergim Hereqi, Tore Løvland and Avni Pepa.

== Recent history ==
Season		Pos.	Pl.	W	D	L	GS	GA	Pts	Cup	Notes
2008	2. divisjon	9	26	9	4	13	45	45	31	Second round	
2009	2. divisjon	6	26	12	4	10	47	47	40	First round	
2010	2. divisjon	7	26	11	5	10	47	52	38	First round	
2011	2. divisjon	3	26	12	5	9	51	54	41	Second round	
2012	2. divisjon	9	26	9	8	9	56	47	35	First round	
2013	2. divisjon	2	26	15	4	7	67	38	49	Second round	
2014	2. divisjon	2	26	16	3	7	71	44	51	First round	
2015	2. divisjon	6	26	9	7	10	61	56	34	Third round	
2016	2. divisjon	4	26	14	2	10	67	50	44	Third round	
2017	2. divisjon	↓ 12	26	6	4	16	44	58	22	First round	Relegated
2018	3. divisjon	3	26	15	2	9	58	48	47	First round	
2019	3. divisjon	4	26	12	7	7	62	48	43	First round	
2020	Season cancelled										
2021	3. divisjon	3	13	8	1	4	32	24	25	First round	
2022	3. divisjon	10	26	7	8	11	53	48	29	First round	
