= Lørenskog IF =

Norwegian football club

- Full name: Lørenskog Idrettsforening
- Founded: April 17, 1929; 96 years ago
- Ground: Rolvsrud stadion
- Chairman: Ola Føll
- Coach: Vetle Rygh
- League: 3. divisjon
- 2025: 3. divisjon, Group 3, 1st of 14 (promoted)
Home colours	Away colours

Lørenskog Idrettsforening is a Norwegian football club from Lørenskog, founded in 1929 as a merger between Lørenskogkameratene and Solheim IF. Most of the time the club has played in the Norwegian Second Division, with a short spell in the Norwegian First Division in 2002.

Notable former players for the club include John Carew, Henning Berg, Espen Olsen, Kim Holmen, Johan Nås and Abdisalam Ibrahim.

== Recent history ==
Season		Pos.	Pl.	W	D	L	GS	GA	P	Cup	Notes
1999	2. divisjon	6	22	10	4	8	42	35	34	1st round	
2000	2. divisjon	6	22	12	4	6	65	37	40	1st round	
2001	2. divisjon	↑1	26	18	5	3	69	23	59	2nd round	Promoted
2002	1. divisjon	↓15	30	5	5	20	31	72	20	3rd round	Relegated
2003	2. divisjon	6	26	11	2	13	48	56	35	1st round	
2004	2. divisjon	2	26	13	9	4	66	40	48	2nd round	
2005	2. divisjon	4	26	13	6	7	67	38	45	1st round	
2006	2. divisjon	3	26	17	3	6	78	36	54	2nd round	
2007	2. divisjon	4	26	12	10	4	58	33	46	1st round	
2008	2. divisjon	2	26	16	3	7	48	27	51	2nd round	
2009	2. divisjon	5	26	13	6	7	55	37	45	2nd round	
2010	2. divisjon	7	26	11	3	12	56	55	36	1st round	
2011	2. divisjon	4	26	12	7	7	55	46	43	3rd round	
2012	2. divisjon	2	26	16	3	7	51	39	51	2nd round	
2013	2. divisjon	10	26	8	7	11	49	56	31	1st round	
2014	2. divisjon	11	26	7	5	14	36	64	26	2nd round	
2015	2. divisjon	9	26	9	6	11	47	40	33	1st round	
2016	2. divisjon	↓10	26	8	4	14	41	49	28	1st round	Relegated
2017	3. divisjon	5	26	12	5	9	54	36	41	1st round	
2018	3. divisjon	3	26	17	4	5	58	34	55	2nd round	
2019	3. divisjon	2	26	19	2	5	75	34	59	2nd round	
2020	3. divisjon	Season cancelled									
2021	3. divisjon	7	13	5	3	5	18	17	18	1st round	
2022	3. divisjon	4	26	14	6	6	61	34	48	1st round	
2023	3. divisjon	2	26	18	1	7	75	30	45	1st round	
2024	3. divisjon	2	26	16	5	5	57	28	53	1st round	
2025	3. divisjon	↑1	26	20	2	4	82	24	62	2nd round	Promoted
2026	2. divisjon										
