= Ski IL =

Norwegian sports club

- Full name: Ski Idrettslag
- Founded: 19 February 1919
- Ground: Ski idrettspark, Ski

Ski Idrettslag is a Norwegian alliance sports club from Ski, Akershus. It has sections for association football, track and field, team handball, floorball, ice hockey, tennis and gymnastics. The club colors are yellow and blue.

== General history ==
The club was founded as Ski TIF on 19 February 1919. In 1946 it incorporated the AIF club AIL Fremad.

== Athletics ==
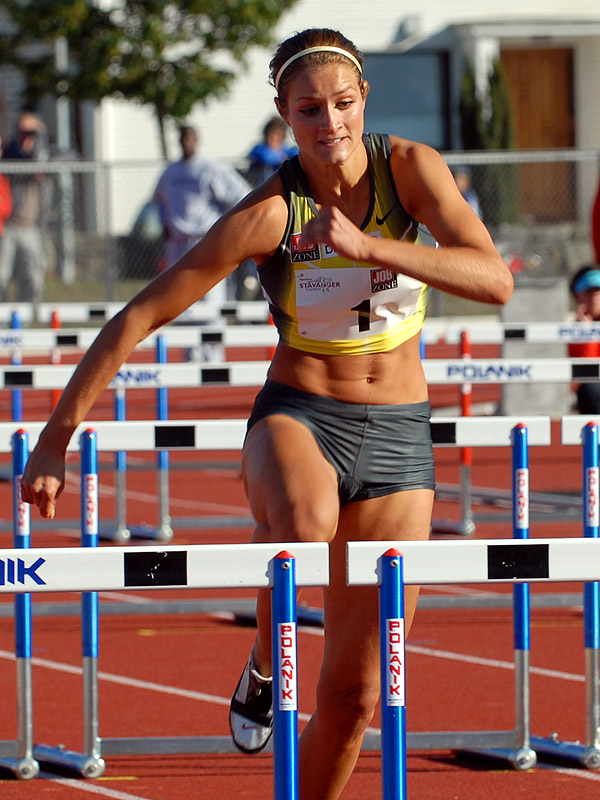
Christina Vukicevic, 2007.

It has been a prominent athletics club for many years. On national level, Ski athletes have taken national championship medals in all the kinds of events. The Ski IL athlete with the most national championships is Tormod Lislerud, who won the discus throw title in 1965, 1966, 1968, 1969, 1970, 1971, 1972, 1973 and 1974. Olympian Christina Vukicevic has won the 100 metres hurdles title six times since 2004, but only three times representing Ski. Her brother Vladimir Vukicevic won the 110 metres hurdles in 2009. Olympic javelin throw champion Trine Solberg Hattestad represented the club in her early career, and won national titles for Ski in 1983, 1984 and 1985 before changing club. Trygve Stenerud became national long jump champion in 1952, and Ellen Aasum became high jump champion in 1985.

Olympic decathlete Trond Høiby has a national silver medal in javelin throw from 2001. Stein Bjørlo was a 10,000 metres silver medalist in 1969, and in 2007 Philip Bjørnå Berntsen (who later changed club) took a silver in 100 metres and bronze in 200 metres. Lise Margareth Jensen got a silver medal (1999) and two bronze in the 400 metres hurdles before changing club. Odd Stenerud took a shot put bronze in 1953, and Monica Ragna Matea Jensen took a hammer throw bronze in 2001. Olympic snowboarder Helene Olafsen has also competed for Ski, in her youth.

== Football ==
Ski IL Fotball
- Ground: Ski idrettspark, Ski
- Capacity: 1,500
- League: Fourth Division (but see also Follo FK)
- 2017: 7th, Fourth Division group 3 (Oslo)
Home colours

The men's football team played in the First Division, the second tier of Norwegian football, as late as in 1993. After being relegated it had a stint in the Second Division until 2000, when it succumbed to Nybergsund IL in a relegation playoff. It had tried to loan their own former youth player Martin Andresen from FA Premiership team Wimbledon F.C., but to no avail.

Ahead of the 2001 season it cooperated with other clubs to form a new umbrella team in the region, Follo FK, founded on 29 September 2000. It immediately won promotion to the Second Division, and currently plays in the First Division. Ski's men's team had to start anew, and currently plays in the Fourth Division.

Follo uses Ski's home field Ski idrettspark. The attendance record for a Ski match is c.3000, recorded at a game in 1976 against Leicester City F.C.

== Handball ==
In handball, Ski is mainly known through the name Fredensborg/Ski. In 1980, Ski IL's handball section cooperated with the handball section of Oslo-based team Fredensborg SBK. The team was successful, but won its last national title in 1985. In 1994 the handball sections of the two clubs formally created the new club Fredensborg/Ski HK, but it lasted only until 1997 when it fell apart for financial reasons. Ski later cooperated with four local teams to form the club Follo HK.

The women's team plays in the Fourth Division. and the men's team in the Third Division.

== Ice hockey ==
A logo used by the hockey teams, under the moniker "Ski Icehawks".

The men's ice hockey team played in the First Division, the second tier of Norwegian ice hockey, in the 2004–2005 season. In the 2009–2010 season it played in the Second Division, where placing quite lowly. The ice arena is named Ski ishall.
