= Valdres FK =

Norwegian football club

- Full name: Valdres Fotballklubb
- Founded: 2006
- Ground: Blåbærmyra, Fagernes
- Capacity: 700 (seated)
- League: Fifth Division
- 2021: Fourth Division, group IØ/1, 7th of 7 (relegated)
- Website: www.valdresfk.no
| Home colours | Away colours |

Valdres Fotballklubb is a Norwegian football club based in Fagernes, Valdres. The men's team currently plays in the Fifth Division, the sixth tier of the Norwegian football league system; whereas the women's team currently plays in the Third Division.

== History ==
The club was founded in December 2001 as a merger between Sør-Aurdal FK and the football branch of Fagernes IL. It was known as SAFK Fagernes until 2006, when the current name was implemented.

The men's team had a run as a mid-table Second Division team between 2008 and 2013. In the 2014 Second Division, the team ended last and faced relegation.

In 2019, the first-team squad was almost completely disintegrated. The remaining team plummeted out of the Third Division, following lacklustre results such as a 0–19 loss. The team started with an outfield player as goalkeeper and often lacked substitutes. However, they were praised for sportsmanship in actually finishing the season instead of pulling out.

The 2020 season was cancelled due to COVID, but as the 2021 Norwegian Fourth Division progressed, Valdres ended last and was relegated to the sixth tier. Still, the team secured a berth in the 2022–23 Norwegian Football Cup first qualifying round. Valdres lost 0–3 to Gran IL.

The women's team plays in the Third Division.

== Season to season ==
Men's team:

| Season | | Pos. | Pl. | W | D | L | GS | GA | P | Cup | Notes |
|---|---|---|---|---|---|---|---|---|---|---|---|
| 2007 | 3. divisjon | ↑ 2 | 22 | 17 | 3 | 2 | 92 | 33 | 54 | Second qualifying round | Promoted |
| 2008 | 2. divisjon | 9 | 26 | 6 | 14 | 6 | 40 | 48 | 32 | Third round | |
| 2009 | 2. divisjon | 6 | 26 | 13 | 6 | 7 | 53 | 41 | 45 | First round | |
| 2010 | 2. divisjon | 9 | 26 | 10 | 5 | 11 | 40 | 45 | 35 | Second round | |
| 2011 | 2. divisjon | 7 | 24 | 10 | 3 | 11 | 42 | 49 | 33 | First round | |
| 2012 | 2. divisjon | 7 | 26 | 10 | 6 | 10 | 38 | 40 | 36 | Second round | |
| 2013 | 2. divisjon | 7 | 26 | 11 | 4 | 11 | 49 | 46 | 37 | First round | |
| 2014 | 2. divisjon | ↓ 14 | 26 | 4 | 4 | 18 | 34 | 74 | 16 | First round | Relegated |
| 2015 | 3. divisjon | 5 | 26 | 14 | 5 | 7 | 46 | 31 | 47 | First round | |
| 2016 | 3. divisjon | 5 | 26 | 16 | 3 | 7 | 64 | 33 | 51 | First round | |
| 2017 | 3. divisjon | 8 | 26 | 10 | 3 | 13 | 39 | 43 | 33 | First qualifying round | |
| 2018 | 3. divisjon | 7 | 26 | 12 | 2 | 12 | 52 | 46 | 38 | First round | |
| 2019 | 3. divisjon | ↓ 14 | 26 | 1 | 0 | 25 | 10 | 193 | 3 | First qualifying round | Relegated |
| 2020 | Season cancelled | | | | | | | | | | |
| 2021 | 4. divisjon | ↓ 7 | 12 | 3 | 0 | 9 | 19 | 46 | 9 | No appearance | Relegated |
