= Randaberg IL =

Norwegian sports club

Randaberg
- Full name: Randaberg Idrettslag
- Founded: 10 April 1925; 101 years ago
- Ground: Randaberg Stadion, Randaberg
- Capacity: 3,000
- Chairman: Stein Revang
- League: 4. divisjon
- 2019: 4. divisjon (Group 12), 4th of 14
Home colours	Away colours

Randaberg Idrettslag is a Norwegian sports club from the village of Randaberg in Randaberg Municipality. It has sections for football, swimming, gymnastics and volleyball.

== Football ==
Before the 2007 season, the football team made the national news as it increased its budget significantly in order to gain promotion, signing players like Petar Rnkovic and Sindre Erstad while Kjell-Inge Bråtveit was hired as manager. Øyvind Svenning, Jørgen Tengesdal and Bjarte Lunde Aarsheim joined Randaberg from first-tier clubs during the summer. The club also unsuccessfully tried to lure former player Erik Fuglestad out of retirement.

Other former Randaberg players include Iven Austbø, Alexander Gabrielsen and Ronny Espedal.

=== Recent history ===
Season		Pos.	Pl.	W	D	L	GS	GA	P	Cup	Notes
2001	3. divisjon	4	22	12	3	7	47	40	39		
2002	3. divisjon	10	22	6	5	11	35	46	23		
2003	3. divisjon	4	22	11	6	5	46	26	39	First round	
2004	3. divisjon	2	22	13	4	5	48	25	43	First qualifying round	
2005	3. divisjon	1	22	17	2	3	75	25	53	First round	Lost playoffs for promotion
2006	3. divisjon	2	22	15	3	4	50	19	48	First round	
2007	3. divisjon	↑ 1	26	24	2	0	83	9	74	Second round	Promoted to the 2. divisjon
2008	2. divisjon	2	26	17	5	4	68	29	56	First round	
2009	2. divisjon	5	26	14	4	8	60	39	46	Second round	
2010	2. divisjon	↑ 1	26	17	2	7	51	40	53	Second round	Promoted to the 1. divisjon
2011	1. divisjon	↓ 15	30	4	5	21	37	85	17	Third round	Relegated to the 2. divisjon
2012	2. divisjon	↓ 14	26	6	3	17	31	49	21	First round	Relegated to the 3. divisjon
2013	3. divisjon	8	26	10	5	11	49	45	35	First qualifying round	
