= FK Tønsberg =

Norwegian football club

- Full name: Fotballklubben Tønsberg
- Nickname(s): FKT
- Founded: 10 October 2001; 23 years ago
- Dissolved: 1 January 2020; merged with Eik-Tønsberg and became FK Eik Tønsberg
- Ground: Tønsberg Gressbane; Tønsberg
- Capacity: 3,600
Home colours	Away colours

FK Tønsberg was a football club from the city of Tønsberg in Tønsberg Municipality in Vestfold county, Norway, founded on 10 October 2001 as a cooperation project between 20 local clubs. The new team replaced Eik-Tønsberg in the Norwegian Second Division beginning in the 2002 season. The first player to sign for the team was Anders Skarbøvik, the former team captain. They currently play in the Third Division.

FK Tønsberg came second in their Second Division group in 2002 and 2003. In 2004 they hired experienced coach Reine Almqvist, won the group and was promoted to the First Division. They were relegated after only one season. They have since fluctuated between the Second and Third Divisions.

On 1 January 2020, FK Tønsberg merged with Eik-Tønsberg and became part of FK Eik Tønsberg.

== Head coaches ==
- Steinar Skeie (2002–03)
- Reine Almqvist (2004–05)
- Per Egil Swift (2006–08)
- Tor Thodesen (2008–2010)
- Hein Irgens Henriksen (2011–?)

== History ==
Season		Pos.	Pl.	W	D	L	GS	GA	P	Cup	Notes
2002	2. divisjon	2	26	16	6	4	76	28	54	First round	
2003	2. divisjon	2	26	12	10	4	57	35	46	Second round	
2004	2. divisjon	↑ 1	26	20	2	4	70	21	62	Second round	Promoted
2005	1. divisjon	↓ 15	30	6	7	17	36	56	25	Third round	Relegated
2006	2. divisjon	4	26	14	8	4	61	26	50	Second round	
2007	2. divisjon	2	26	15	8	3	72	31	53	Third round	
2008	2. divisjon	3	26	17	4	5	75	35	55	Second round	
2009	2. divisjon	3	26	17	2	7	81	39	53	First round	
2010	2. divisjon	3	26	13	7	6	62	39	46	Fourth round	
2011	2. divisjon	6	26	13	3	10	48	50	42	Second round	
2012	2. divisjon	11	26	10	3	13	32	52	31	First round	
2013	2. divisjon	↓ 13	26	5	5	16	44	67	20	Second round	Relegated
2014	3. divisjon	2	26	19	2	5	94	31	59	Second qual. round	
2015	3. divisjon	↑ 1	26	25	0	1	109	19	75	First round	Promoted
2016	2. divisjon	↓ 10	26	10	6	10	38	41	36	Second round	Relegated
2017	3. divisjon	4	26	11	7	8	48	41	40	First round	
2018	3. divisjon	4	26	13	7	6	54	30	46	First qual. round	
2019	3. divisjon	2	26	16	4	6	56	25	52	First round	
