= Manglerud Star Toppfotball =

Manglerud Star
- Full name: Manglerud Star Fotball
- Nickname(s): M/S Oslo
- Founded: January 1, 2000; 25 years ago as Oslo Øst
- Ground: Manglerud kunstgress
- Chairman: Kathe Bleken
- Manager: Atle Jan Larsen
- League: Fourth division
Home colours	Away colours

Active departments of Manglerud Star
- Football (Men's): Ice hockey

Manglerud Star Fotball is an association football club based in Oslo, Norway. It is part of the multi-sport club Manglerud Star. The club was established in its current form on December 14, 2005 after a merger between Manglerud Star Fotball and Fotballklubben Oslo Øst, the latter of which originally formed in 2000. Manglerud Star Fotball went bankrupt on April 4, 2011, and withdrew all their teams from competition; the club was refounded in 2013.

== History ==
FK Oslo Øst (Oslo East) were founded on January 1, 2000. Five minor football clubs from the eastern part of Oslo decided to pool their resources into a single elite team, under the presumption that this one team would fare better at the higher levels of Norwegian football than what any of the clubs could ever achieve on their own. The five clubs were Oppsal IF, Abildsø IL, Rustad IL, Nordstrand IF and Manglerud Star Fotball. Nordstrand later withdrew from the project and were replaced by Hauketo Fotball.

Oslo Øst played their home games at Lambertseter stadion, a multi-use stadium in the borough of Nordstrand.

In 2001, Oslo Øst won promotion the 1st Division, and managed to retain their spot in the league. The club was relegated in 2003, then again earned promotion to the 1st Division to start the 2006 season.

During the six years in which Oslo Øst existed they were continuously hampered by financial problems, with the greater costs associated with playing in the 1st Division in 2006, the club faced imminent insolvency. At the end of 2005, a solution was reached whereby Oslo Øst joined the multimodal sports club Manglerud Star, of which one of the five founding clubs of Oslo Øst, Manglerud Star Fotball, had been a subdivision. The name "Oslo Øst" was dropped and the clubs were merged to form a new club, named Manglerud Star Toppfotball, effective for the 2006 season.

The new Manglerud Star club had reduced its costs by having access to the training facilities at Manglerud, and sharing some of its administration with the parent club. Despite this, Manglerud Star went bankrupt on April 4, 2011, and withdrew their two men's team and the women's team.

In 2013, Manglerud Star was refounded and, at the conclusion of the 2015 season, earned promotion to the 3. divisjon for 2016.

== Recent history ==
=== 2006–2010 ===
Season		Pos.	Pl.	W	D	L	GS	GA	P	Cup	Notes
2006	AL	14	30	7	7	16	46	79	28	3rd round	Relegated to the 2. divisjon
2007	D2	3	26	15	5	6	44	24	50	3rd round	
2008	D2	8	26	9	5	12	48	43	32	3rd round	
2009	D2	5	26	15	0	11	52	38	45	1st round	
2010	D2	5	26	11	8	7	62	46	41	1st round	

Folded early in the 2011 season.

=== 2013– ===
Season		Pos.	Pl.	W	D	L	GS	GA	P	Cup	Notes
2013	D5	1	18	17	1	0	63	12	52		Promoted to the 4. Divisjon
2014	D4	6	22	9	3	10	39	42	30		
2015	D4	1	20	12	4	4	47	20	40		Promoted to the 3. divisjon
