= Follo FK =

Norwegian football club

- Full name: Follo Fotballklubb
- Founded: 29 September 2000; 26 years ago
- Ground: Ski stadion, Ski
- Capacity: 2,500
- Chairman: Jan Thomas Birkeland
- Manager: Anders Særvold
- League: 2. divisjon
- 2025: 2. divisjon Group 2, 11th
Home colours	Away colours

Follo Fotballklubb is a football club from Ski, Akershus, Norway.

Follo play in light blue, and their home ground is Ski stadion. It was founded in September 2000 and their biggest achievement was playing in the 2010 Norwegian Football Cup final.

== History ==
It was founded in September 2000 as an umbrella team for the football departments of five local teams; Ås IL, Oppegård IL, Langhus IL, Ski IL and Nordby IL.

Follo's had a good Norwegian Cup run in 2006, when they made it all the way to the quarter-finals, eventually losing at home 0–1 to the cup finalists Sandefjord. But on the way to the quarters they beat defending holders Molde.

Four years later, in 2010, they made it to the Norwegian Cup final, beating Tippeligaen club Lillestrøm 4–2 in the third round, and then later Rosenborg 3–2 in the semi-finals. Rosenborg were at the time unbeaten and on top of the Tippeligaen, while Follo were at the bottom of the Adeccoligaen. NRK's match commentator Hallvar Thoresen dubbed Follo's victory against Rosenborg the greatest Norwegian cup shock of all time. In the first cup final in the club's history, Follo lost 2–0 against Strømsgodset.

Thus, despite attaining their best league and cup finish ever, Follo were still relegated to the third tier of Norwegian football. The team managed to stay clear of the relegation zone by the margin of a single point, but were still relegated on account of a clerical error in which they did not finish their application for a 2011 license in time for the 15 September deadline.

Before the 2011 Second Division, Follo was considered one of the favourites to earn promotion back to Adeccoligaen, but when the season was finished Follo was number ten, only four points clear of another relegation.

On July 13, 2012, four players (three of them from Follo) were arrested by police due to match fixing allegations in games involving Follo and Asker Fotball. Follo's 4–3 loss after being 3–0 up by Østsiden IL was deemed suspicious because of the odd score line and high bettings placed on this game. The 2012 season saw Follo earn promotion, but the club was relegated after only one season in the First Division.

== Season history ==
Season		Pos.	Pl.	W	D	L	GS	GA	P	Cup	Notes
2001	3. divisjon	↑ 1	22	18	1	3	79	22	55	1st round	Promoted
2002	2. divisjon	3	26	13	5	8	51	42	44	1st round	
2003	2. divisjon	11	26	8	5	13	36	48	29	1st round	
2004	2. divisjon	↑ 1	26	16	6	4	57	22	54	1st round	Promoted
2005	1. divisjon	11	30	8	10	12	40	47	34	2nd round	
2006	1. divisjon	↓ 15	30	6	7	17	46	76	25	Quarterfinal	Relegated
2007	2. divisjon	5	26	14	4	8	48	30	49	2nd round	
2008	2. divisjon	6	26	10	7	9	44	35	37	2nd round	
2009	2. divisjon	↑ 1	26	19	3	4	59	25	60	2nd round	Promoted
2010	1. divisjon	↓ 12	28	8	8	12	35	43	32	Final	Relegated^{1}
2011	2. divisjon	10	24	7	5	12	47	51	26	1st round	
2012	2. divisjon	↑ 1	26	18	2	6	58	28	56	1st round	Promoted
2013	1. divisjon	↓ 15	30	9	2	19	40	57	27	3rd round	Relegated
2014	2. divisjon	↑1	26	21	3	2	97	16	66	3rd round	Promoted
2015	1. divisjon	↓ 13	30	8	9	13	42	43	33	2nd round	Relegated
2016	2. divisjon	5	26	12	5	9	48	39	41	1st round	
2017	2. divisjon	↓ 14	26	6	4	16	28	58	22	1st round	Relegated
2018	3. divisjon	6	26	9	8	9	39	47	35	1st round	
2019	3. divisjon	3	26	16	3	7	44	27	51	1st round	
2020	3. divisjon	Season cancelled									
2021	3. divisjon	10	13	3	6	4	18	14	15	1st round	
2022	3. divisjon	2	26	18	3	4	63	31	58	1st round	
2023	3. divisjon	↑ 1	26	22	3	1	80	22	69	1st round	Promoted
2024	2. divisjon	9	26	10	4	12	46	57	34	1st round	
2025	2. divisjon	11	26	8	2	16	33	50	26	2nd round	
2026	2. divisjon	↓ 12	26	5	5	16	34	54	20		Relegated
2027	3. divisjon		26								

- ^{1} Relegated because license was revoked

== Achievements ==
- Norwegian Cup:
  - Runners-up (1): 2010

== Current squad ==
As of 1 September 2026

Note: Flags indicate national team as defined under FIFA eligibility rules; some limited exceptions apply. Players may hold more than one non-FIFA nationality.

No.	Pos.	Nation	Player
1	GK	NOR	Erik Østbye
2	DF	NOR	Jabes Maturire
3	DF	NOR	Shahram Jabari
4	DF	NOR	Henrik Hagen
5	DF	NOR	Haakon Ludvigsen
6	MF	KOS	Florind Lokaj
7	FW	NOR	Habib Diallo
8	MF	NOR	Emil Tjøstheim
9	FW	NOR	Albert Tjåland
11	FW	NOR	Nicolai Skoglund
12	FW	NOR	Yossef Ibrahim
13	GK	NOR	Sander Rød (on loan from Kristiansund)
14	FW	NOR	Fredrik Leren Hoel
15	DF	NOR	André Nysted
16	DF	NOR	William Andrade-Hellerud
17	FW	NOR	Mustapha Fofana

No.	Pos.	Nation	Player
18	MF	NOR	Sander Martinsen-Wold
19	FW	NOR	Maximilian Dahl
20	DF	NOR	Sadri Gashi
21	MF	NOR	Mathias Øfsti Bråten
22	FW	MAR	Otman Khris
23	DF	NOR	Almin Hrustic
24	MF	NOR	Lukas Følstad-Andersen
25	MF	NOR	Noah Mathias Josefsson
26	FW	NOR	Gustav Sving Helling
27	MF	NOR	Jonas Jorde
28	MF	NOR	Niklas Schmidt-Løvlund
29	FW	NOR	Joakim Halsnes Knudsen
30	FW	NOR	Joakim Kjensli
31	MF	NOR	Teo Aarhus Bastiansen
32	DF	NOR	Jakob Granli
35	FW	NOR	El Schaddai Furaha
