= Unity Arena =

Indoor multi-purpose arena in Oslo, Norway

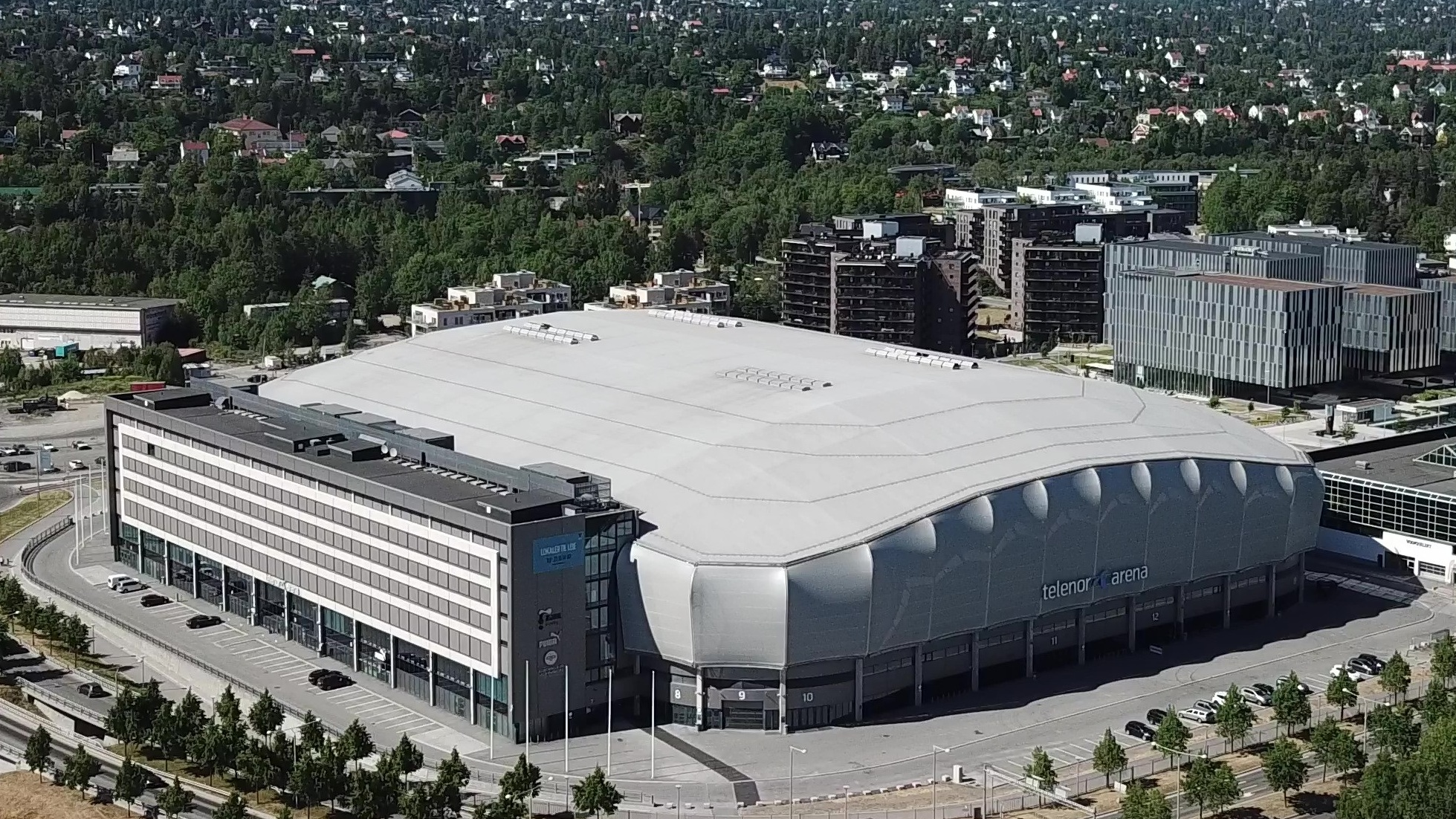
- Interactive map of Unity Arena
- Former names: Telenor Arena (2008-2024)
- Address: Norway
- Location: Fornebu, Bærum, Norway
- Coordinates: 59.9037°N 10.623°E
- Owner: Euforum Holding
- Operator: Fornebu Arena AS
- Capacity: 15,000 (sport); 25,000 (concerts)
- Surface: Asphalt

Construction
- Groundbreaking: 2007
- Opened: 8 March 2009
- Cost: NOK 585 million EUR € 65 million
- Architect: HRTB
- Main contractor: NCC

Tenant
- Stabæk Fotball (2009–2011)

Website
- unityarena.no

Unity Arena, previously known as Telenor Arena and Fornebu Arena, is a multi-purpose indoor arena located at Fornebu in Bærum, outside Oslo, Norway. It serves as a venue for a variety of events, including concerts, exhibitions, action shows, family shows, TV and sport. It has a capacity for 15,000 spectators for sports and 25,000 for concerts, including 40 luxury boxes and club seating for 1,200. The venue has a fixed roof and an asphalt floor. The venue was opened ahead of the 2009 Norwegian football season as a replacement for Nadderud Stadion. It cost 585 million Norwegian kroner (NOK) to build, of which NOK 300 million was for the sports venue. The arena hosted the 2025 World Men's Handball Championship with the country, Croatia and Denmark, including the final.

During the 2000s, Nadderud was below standards for play in the top national league. Fornebu was at the time undergoing an urban redevelopment; after several years of negotiations and public grants, Stabæk secured a lot in 2004. Construction started in 2007. In 2010, a disagreement arose between the club and venue-owner Kjell Chr. Ulrichsen, with the latter demanding that the team leave the venue to allow for more event revenue. Telenor Arena has hosted the Eurovision Song Contest 2010, as well as concerts by artists and bands of international fame, such as Madonna, Britney Spears, The Weeknd, Tina Turner, Adele, Muse, Olivia Rodrigo, Foo Fighters, Roger Waters (the Wall tour), Rihanna, Lady Gaga, Beyoncé, Jay-Z, Kanye West, Iron Maiden, Metallica, AC/DC, Black Sabbath, The Rolling Stones, Justin Bieber, Celine Dion and Drake.

== History ==
=== Planning ===
Stabæk traditionally has played their home games at Nadderud Stadion, a municipal multi-purpose stadium at Bekkestua. Following the club's rapid ascent from lower divisions to the top league during the first half of the 1990s, Nadderud became in need of upgrades, resulting in a new main grandstand opening in 1996. The stadium remained severely lacking adequate facilities for professional football, and fell short of increasing requirements from the Football Association of Norway (NFF).

Originally, a redevelopment of Nadderud was proposed, but in 1999 Stabæk players launched the idea of building a new stadium at Fornebu, which became subject to an urban redevelopment project after the 1998 closing of Oslo Airport, Fornebu. The initial proposal was named Blue Dream Arena, would have seating for 25,000 spectators, blue artificial turf and a retractable roof. Other proposed amenities were movable seating which would also allow the stadium to both host athletics and be configured as an intimate football stadium. The idea called for Bruce Springsteen to hold a concert before the first match, which would be played against Barcelona. Several of the initial concepts of the stadium were never materialized. International rules disallowed blue artificial turf; instead, the flooring in the boxes were made in a blue, artificial turf-inspired material. Also the idea of having a retractable roof was discarded, both because of technical difficulties and cost issues.

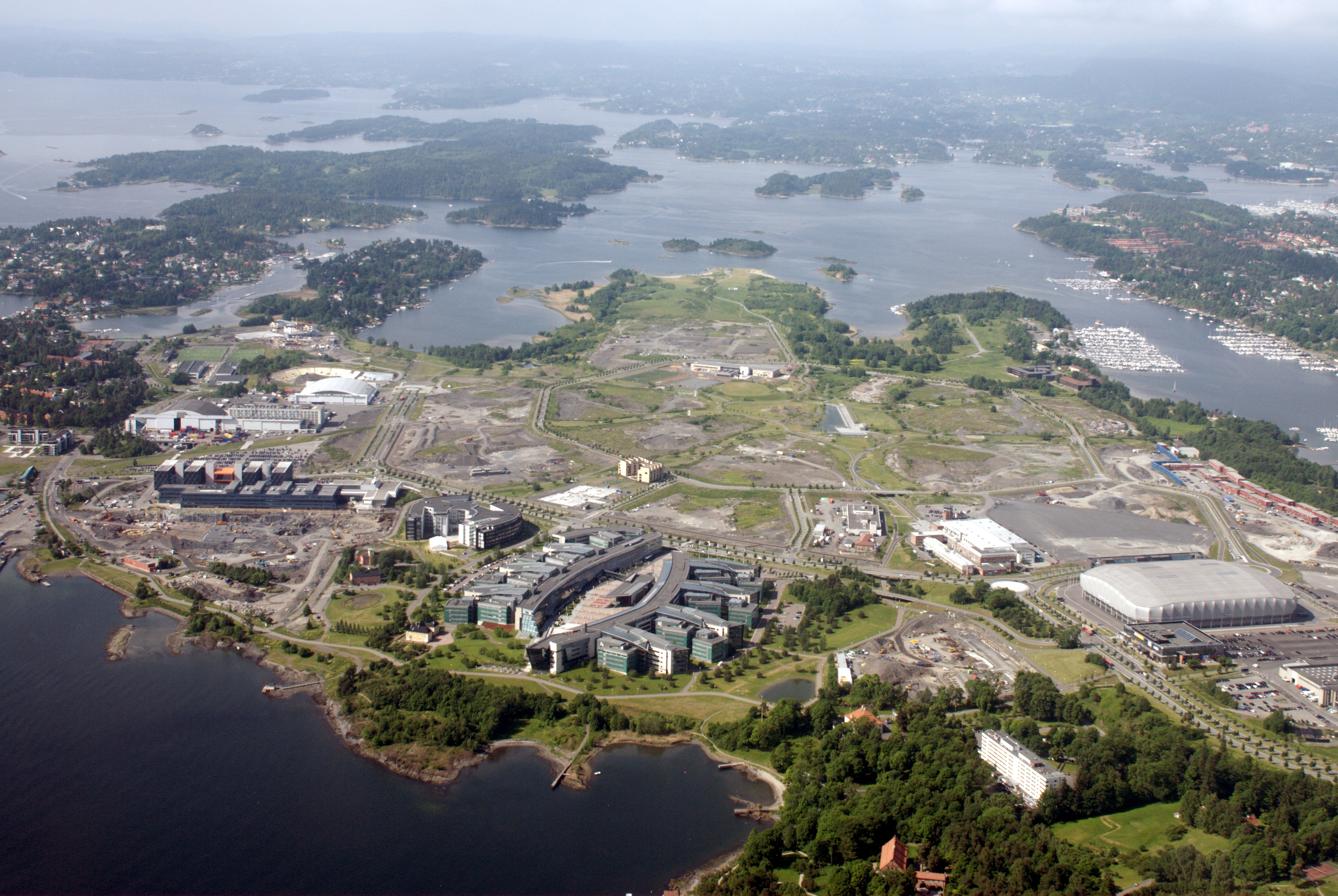
Aerial view of Fornebu with Telenor Arena to the right

In May 2001, Oslo City Council voted to sell their properties at Fornebu to Fornebu Boligspar (FB), which again had agreements to sell a lot for the stadium to Stabæk. In November 2002, Borgarting Court of Appeal concluded that Norrønafly had the right to continue leasing a hangar—located at the planned location of the venue—until 2014. In June 2003, Stabæk was in financial difficulties, and investor Kjell Chr. Ulrichsen bought shares for NOK 10 million to avoid bankruptcy; these shares had the option to be converted to shares in the arena company.

Fornebu Boligspar later determined that it was more profitable to build apartments at the arena site. Negotiations started between the club, the property company and Mayor Odd Reinsfelt. In November 2003, it was announced that a compromise was reached whereby Fornebu Boligspar would give the lot free to Stabæk, in exchange for a lot nearby. Two weeks later the compromise was rejected by FB. A new compromise was announced on 29 June 2004, whereby FB would give 50 million Norwegian krone (NOK) and a lot free to Stabæk in exchange for the commercial properties which would be part of the stadium. However, the following day the parties announced that they were not able to agree on the risk, as Stabæk demanded that FB take the full risk in the project.

Instead, Stabæk started negotiating with IT Fornebu to take over a lot they owned. They needed a 300 hectares (740 acres) lot which would have a market value of between NOK 60 and 80 million, and Reinsfelt stated that the municipality was willing to help by "maneuver in gray areas within the margins". The club was further pressured by NFF, who were going to limit the exceptions allowed for Nadderud and other stadiums not meeting their criteria. On 29 October, FB and Stabæk signed an agreement whereby Stabæk received a free lot and NOK 50 million, in exchange for FB taking over the commercial properties. The condition was that the municipality allowed a more dense use of the rest of FB's area. This would require a re-regulation of the area, and Reinsfelt estimated that it would not be possible for construction to start until 2006. In November, UEFA changed the rules for artificial turf to state that it had to be green. Until Stabæk's proposal was made, UEFA had not thought that anyone would build a pitch with a non-green turf, and representatives stated that it was because of Stabæk the rule change was made. The plans were nearly terminated in October 2006, after discussion about the planned Fornebu Line—a people mover which would connect Fornebu to Lysaker—stopped the regulation plan. However, in November the final permissions were granted by Bærum Municipality. On 22 December, Stabæk announced that the financing was secured.

=== Construction ===
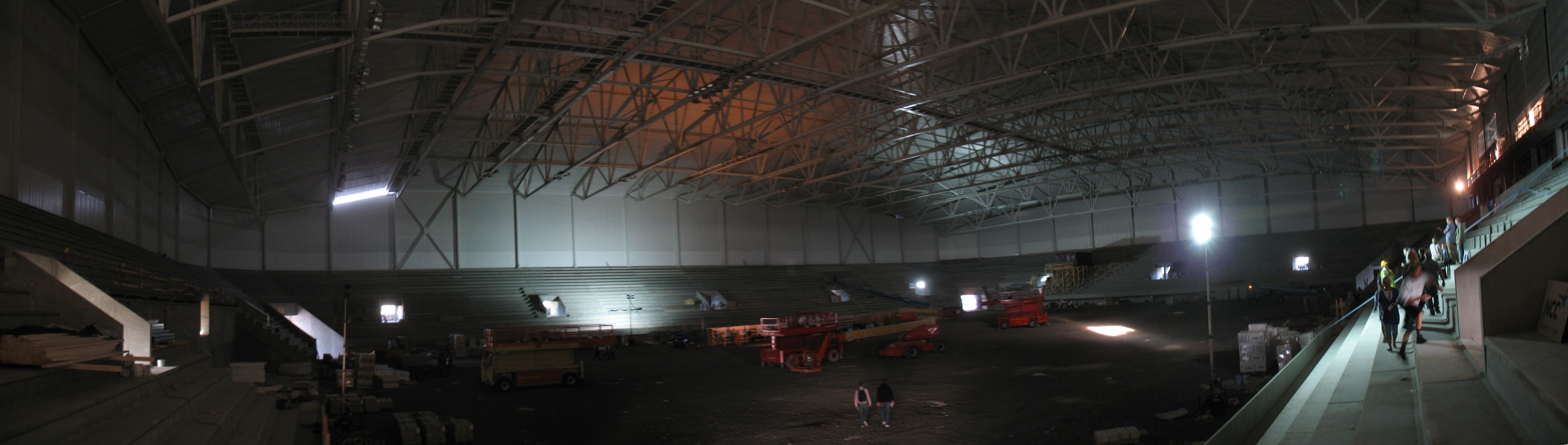
During construction (August 2008)

Architects were HRTB and the main contractor was NCC Construction. While domed stadiums have been common in North America, no such stadiums of comparable size of Telenor Arena had previously been built for football in Europe. Construction started by demolishing a hangar, which was completed in February 2007. However, because of the building boom, concrete elements needed for construction to start meant that the rest of the construction was delayed. The cornerstone was laid on 5 September.

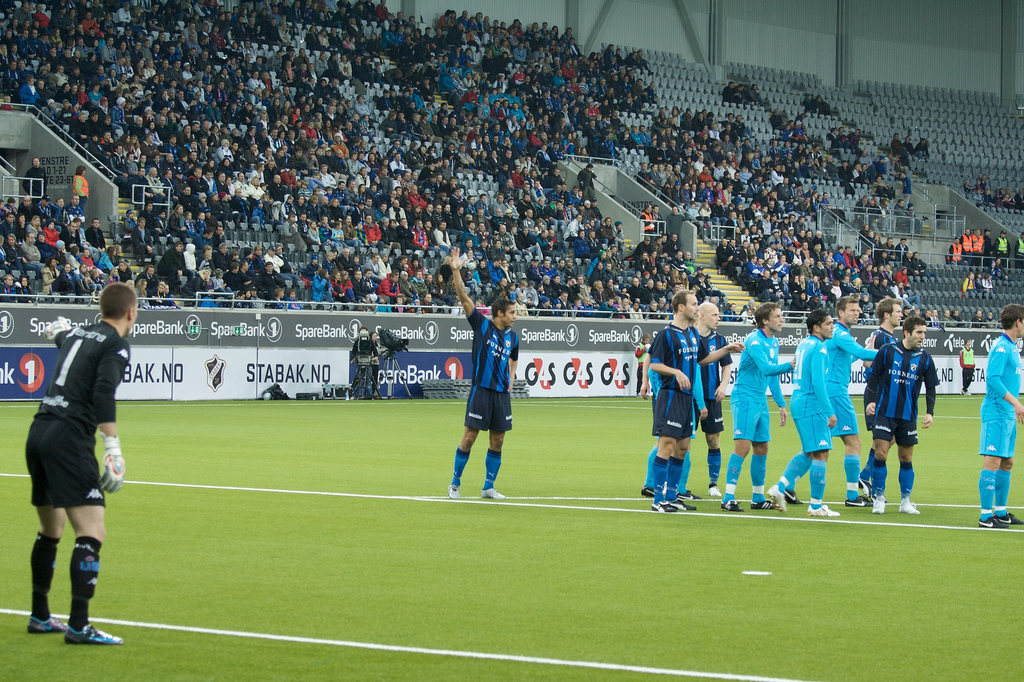
2009 Superfinalen, the first official match at the arena

In June 2008, Stabæk announced they had signed an eleven-year sponsorship agreement with the telecommunications company Telenor, where the latter would pay up to NOK 115 million for the sole naming rights for the arena, in addition to tickets and access to executive boxes. In March 2009, the retailing property was sold from Scandinavian Property Development to KLP Eiendom. The plans called for twenty to twenty-five football games, four to eight concerts, three to four large sports events and two other large events and conventions per year. Because of larger seating capacity, an all-seating arrangement, higher attendance and VIP facilities, Stabæk is able to generate three times the matchday revenue from Telenor Arena as Nadderud. The stadium is plagued with traffic problems on matchdays, with large crews hired to create temporary barriers to direct the crowds. The bus stops closest to the venue are closed, and a large number of police officers have to direct the traffic. These are costs which have to be carried by the arena company, and contrasts to matches at the nearly twice as large Ullevaal, where no such measures are necessary.

=== Football versus event controversy ===
In October 2009, ten individuals bought the operation company of the club and signed a 40-year lease for the use of the arena for Stabæk's home matches, as well as the right to use the facility for certain other activities. This contract has a revenue of NOK 9 million per year. In 2009, Stabæk Holding had a deficit of NOK 66.1 million, while Stabæk Fotball lost NOK 23.6 million. To keep the operating company running, Ulrichsen increased the company's share capital by NOK 73 million from late 2009 through late 2010.

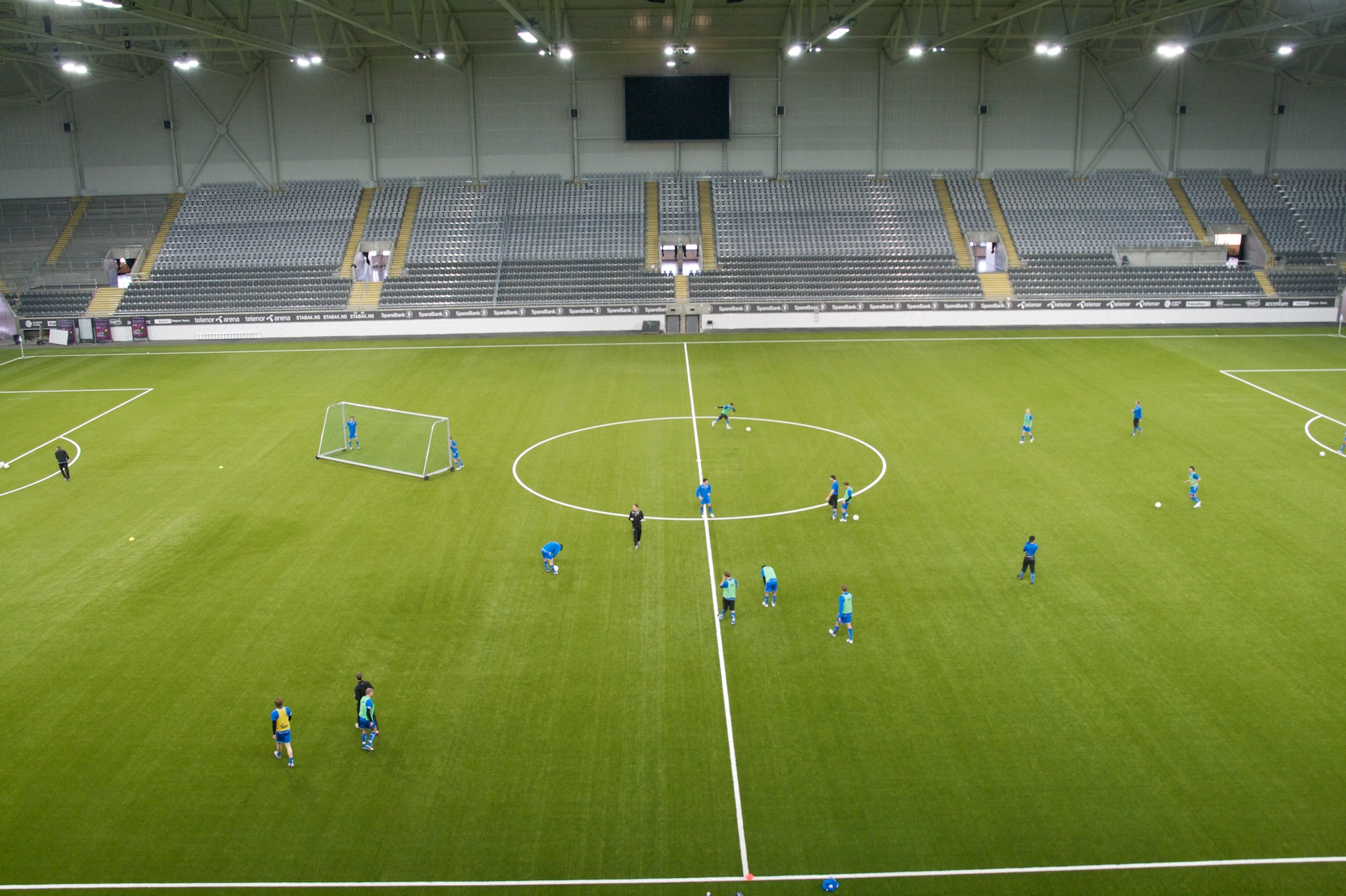
Training at the venue

On 4 November 2010, Stabæk Holding stated that they were near a bankruptcy, and that they intended to throw out Stabæk as a tenant, remove the turf and instead use the venue exclusively for events. Chair Diderik Schnitler in Stabæk Holding stated that the business model was not sustainable. The football schedule was not made until early in the year, while in the event business, bookings were common one to two years in advance. It was therefore difficult to secure lucrative events, as large parts of the year had to be held in reserve in case the venue was needed for yet-to-be scheduled matches. The holding company stated that they might have to file for bankruptcy. Stabæk Fotball stated that they had a 40-year contract to use the venue.

Stabæk's director of sports, Inge André Olsen, stated that returning to Nadderud was not an option, as it had too little capacity and insufficient facilities. Should Nadderud be used, it would have to be rebuilt, with new grandstands under roofs, VIP seating, a new parking house and new change room, which would cost NOK 100 million. Because of building permits, construction would take two to three years. Nadderud is also not approved to host games in the Premier League, so Stabæk would have to either play their games at Ullevaal Stadion in Oslo or Marienlyst Stadion in Drammen. Telenor stated that if Stabæk moved, they would have to re-negotiate the naming rights agreement for the arena, as the value of the contract was largely based on the naming exposure of Stabæk playing in the Premier League. The company also stated that they had difficulty understanding the argumentation from the holding company, as there was no football being played October and March, but that the venue, which has the largest capacity for indoor concerts in the Oslo area, failed to attract large artists, such as Rihanna, during the winter months.

On 4 December, Stabæk Fotball stated that they were willing to move their training, Norwegian Football Cup and UEFA matches to either Nadderud or Ullevaal, as a compromise to free up more available time in the arena. This was rejected by NFF, who stated that the licensing rules required that a club's main arena be available for all league, cup and UEFA matches, and that a general exemption would not be given for the cup. In mid-December, Stabæk Fotball started the process of a judicial registration of the right to lease the venue, which was permitted according to the contract. This would grant Stabæk Fotball the right to continue to lease the venue even if the holding company went bankrupt. A preliminary injunction for this was granted by Asker and Bærum District Court.

In a 16 December statement, three Stabæk Fotball officials said that they suspected that Ulrichen's plan all along was to convert the venue to a pure convention center, and that the use as a football venue was a decoy to get a free lot worth up to NOK 200 million plus grants worth NOK 50 million. The book value of the venue was NOK 303 million at the end of 2010, although a statement from the district court stated that the value of the venue was significantly lower than that. The bank DnB NOR held at the time a mortgage with security in the property worth NOK 260 million, while Ulrichsen through his investment company held a mortgage worth NOK 60.1 million.

On 7 January 2011, the parts announced that they had reached a compromise. Stabæk would remain at Telenor Arena for at least the 2011 season. In addition, the club held an option to take over the responsibility for events at the venue. Stabæk Fotball had until 30 June to accept the option, which would allow the club to remain at the venue on a permanent basis. This would require them to invest NOK 20 million in an event administration, which would increase event revenue, but at the same time move the risk from Stabæk Holding to Stabæk Fotball. If the club declined the option, they would not be allowed to play at the venue from the 2012 season. On 30 June, Stabæk announced that they would not fulfill the option to continue renting the stadium. The necessary NOK 35 million would entail a risk the club was not willing to take. The club stated that they hoped they could remain at the stadium by establishing a foundation which could purchase the venue form Ulrichsen. If this does not work out, the club will have to relocate from the 2012 season. The club is then considering relocating back to Nadderud, to Ullevaal or to Marienlyst. The club estimates that any relocation would result in the club losing half their revenue. Stabæk played its last match at Fornebu Arena on 20 November 2011, losing 1–2 against Haugesund. Subsequently, the pitch was removed, and Stabæk returned to Nadderud from the 2012 season.

The Norwegian Handball Federation announced in May 2013 that the arena would be used for a four-nation men's handball tournament, Bring Cup, in November. The federation stated that they would use the tournament to evaluate if the venue was suitable as a new national arena for handball. The venue received mixed reviews. The tournament saw low attendance and Danish commentator Bent Nyegaard criticized the arena for being too large. The federation was happy with the arena, and stated that were planning on using it for finals in their bid for future World and European Handball Championships. Telenor Arena was part of the Oslo bid for the 2022 Winter Olympics, in which it had been proposed to be used for short track speed skating and figure skating.

== Facilities ==
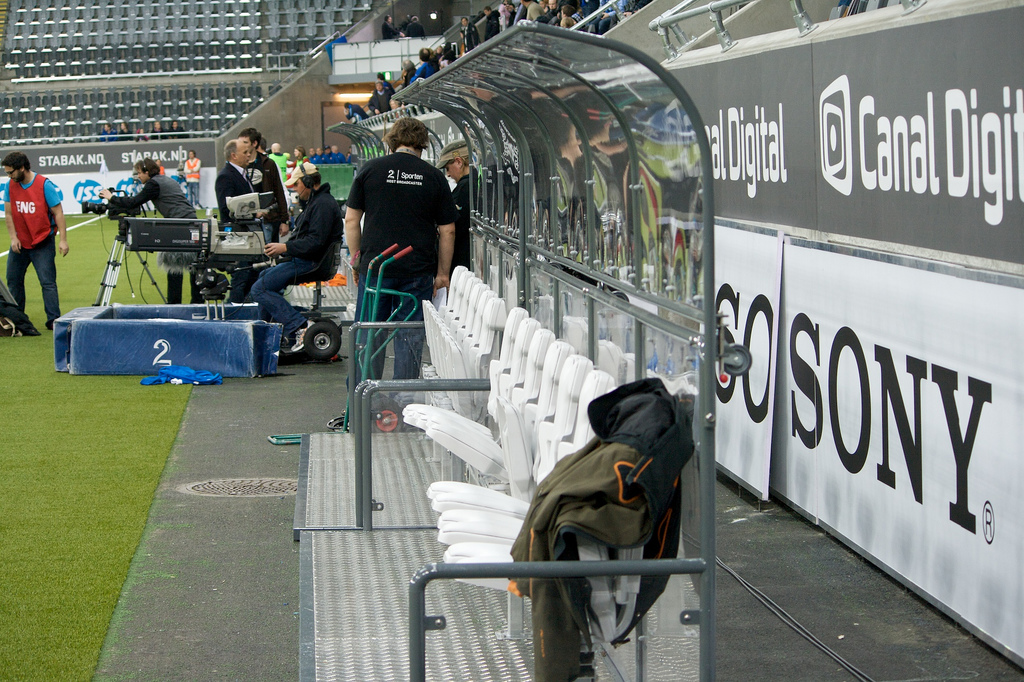
A film crew at a match

The venue is located at Fornebu, a peninsula in Bærum, located 10 kilometers (6.2 mi) from the city center of Oslo. The venue is owned and operated by Fornebu Arena AS, which is again owned by Stabæk Holding, which also owns Stabæk Fotball. Telenor, Norway's largest telecommunications company, holds the naming rights for the stadium. The venue has seating for 15,000 spectators for football, and 25,000 for concerts. This includes club seating for 1,200, 40 luxury boxes and a restaurant which can seat 800. The arena is entirely indoors, and has a height clearance of 23 meters (75 ft) to the beams and 33 meters (108 ft) to the roof. The floor surface is 120 by 82 meters (394 by 269 ft), while the pitch is 105 by 60 meters (344 by 197 ft). The venue has a considerably lower heating cost than similar conventional halls because the warm air is stored in the building's concrete and steel elements, and using the inert energy created by the spectators. The venue is the largest indoor stadium in Northern Europe. The retailing area of 2,600 square metres (28,000 sq ft) in the complex is owned by Arena Handel AS, a subsidiary of KLP Eiendom.

The venue is owned and operated by a conglomerate of six companies all owned by Kjell Christian Ulrichsen. The mother company for the other companies is Stabæk Holding AS. Fornebu Arena AS is the actual owner of the real estate. Fornebu Event AS is responsible for renting out the venue for concerts, conventions and other non-sporting events. FA Leie AS partially leases and partially owns installed facilities in the venue. Sameiedrift Widerøeveien nr. 1 AS is the management company for the property as a whole. Arena Idrett AS hold the rental guarantee given to Fornebu Arena by the renters of the commercial properties and Sameiedrift Widerøeveien nr. 1.

== Transport ==
Ruter bus 31 is a high-frequency service which runs from the city center of Oslo via Lysaker Station to Fornebu. During regular schedule it stops just outside the stadium; however, on matchdays it stops further away because of traffic. Lysaker Station is served by both the Oslo Commuter Rail and selected intercity and regional trains. Dedicated football buses are operated by Ruter to Stabæk home games. There are 1,500 parking spaces immediately near the venue, although additional parking is available at IT Fornebu and at Lysaker, which are a seven- and fifteen-minute walk away, respectively. The Fornebu Line is under planning, and would be built either as a light rail or a rapid transit, which would allow rail transport from the city center of Oslo and Lysaker to the stadium.

The arena often gets uncomfortably hot when the capacity is full and the organisers were criticized for the water priced at 44 NOK (approximately $4,7) for a cup with water.

== Sports ==
Telenor Arena was between 2009 and 2011 the home ground for Stabæk Fotball, which then played in Eliteserien. The first match was a friendly against Sweden's IFK Göteborg on 24 January 2009. The official opening took place on 8 March, when it was host of Superfinalen 2009, a pre-season match between Stabæk as league champions and Vålerenga as cup champions.

Stabæk has played four UEFA tournament matches at Fornebu: against Tirana and Copenhagen during the qualification for the 2009–10 UEFA Champions League, against Valencia in the play-off for the 2009–10 UEFA Europa League, and against Dnepr Mogilev in the qualification for the 2010–11 UEFA Europa League. Stabæk's record attendance at Telenor Arena dates from 13 September 2009, when 13,402 people saw a league game against Rosenborg. The record in a UEFA game was 12,560, who saw the match against Copenhagen.

The following list shows the average, maximum and minimum attendance for Stabæk's home games in the Premier League. It also gives the rank among the average attendance for the Premier League teams.

Attendance
Season	Avg	Min	Max	Rank	Ref
2009	9,472	8,115	13,409	7	
2010	8,006	6,661	11,807	8	
2011	7,502	5,686	11,930	8	

== Concerts ==
Entertainment events held at the Telenor Arena
Year	Date	Nationalities	Artists	Events	Supporting Acts	Attendance	Box Office
2009	18 February	Australia	AC/DC	Black Ice World Tour		22,449 / 22,643	$1,771,047
2009	23 April	United States	Tina Turner	50th Anniversary Tour		14,014 / 17,050	$1,737,664
2010	13 & 14 April	United States	Metallica	World Magnetic Tour	Gojira	49,587 / 50,000	$5,059,884
2010	25, 27 May & 29	Eurovision Song Contest 2010				—N/a	
2011	11 April	United States	Jeff Dunham	Identity Crysis		Unknown	
2011	30 April & 1 May	United Kingdom	Roger Waters	The Wall Live (2010–2013)		36,034 / 36,034	$5,597,370
2011	6 July	United Kingdom	Iron Maiden	The Final Frontier World Tour	Alice Cooper	14,756 / 17,795	$1,700,639
2012	28 May	United States	Jay-Z & Kanye West	Watch the Throne Tour	—N/a	18,000 / 18,000	—N/a
2012	15 August	United States	Madonna	The MDNA Tour	CLMD	18,631 / 18,631	$3,017,871
2012	6 December	United States	Lady Gaga	Born This Way Ball	The Darkness	14,566 / 14,566	$1,748,812
2012	10 December	Germany	Scorpions	Get Your Sting and Blackout		3,500 / 7,000	$427,623
2013	1 March	United States	The Killers	Battle Born World Tour	Unknown		
2013	16, 17 April & 18	Canada	Justin Bieber	Believe Tour	Carly Rae Jepsen	69,246 / 71,091	$7,887,802
2013	29 & 30 April	United States	Bruce Springsteen	Wrecking Ball World Tour	—N/a	43,918 / 43,918	$5,836,045
2013	7 May	United Kingdom	One Direction	Take Me Home Tour	Camryn	18,886 / 18,886	$1,113,160
2013	21 May	United States	Bon Jovi	Because We Can Tour	—N/a	17,657 / 17,657	$2,667,533
2013	25 May	United States	P!NK	The Truth About Love Tour	Churchill	16,685 / 17,967	$1,659,300
2013	28 May	United States	Beyoncé	The Mrs. Carter Show World Tour	LidoLido	21,989 / 21,989	$2,204,442
2013	24 July	United Kingdom	Muse	The 2nd Law World Tour	Datarock	14,663 / 14,663	$1,437,381
2013	25 July	Barbados	Rihanna	Diamonds World Tour	GTA	17,832 / 17,832	$2,250,403
2013	14 & 15 August	United Kingdom	Roger Waters	The Wall Live	—N/a	33,324 / 35,000	$4,630,713
2013	14 November	Canada	Nickelback	Here and Now Tour	Skillet	—N/a	
2013	24 November	United Kingdom	Black Sabbath	Black Sabbath Reunion Tour	—N/a		
2013	13 December	United Kingdom	Depeche Mode	Delta Machine Tour	—N/a	12,743 / 12,743	$1,238,945
2014	8 May	United States	Justin Timberlake	The 20/20 Experience World Tour	DJ Freestyle	19,050 / 19,050	$2,087,482
2014	13 May	United Kingdom	Robbie Williams	Swings Both Ways Live	—N/a	18,000 / 18,000	—N/a
2014	26 May	United Kingdom	The Rolling Stone	14 On Fire	BigBang	22,405 / 22,405	$5,177,648
2014	28 May	United States	Miley Cyrus	Bangerz Tour	TDK	21,120 / 21,120	Unknown
2014	29 June	United States	Pearl Jam	Lightning Bolt Tour	Unknown		
2014	29 September	United States	Lady Gaga	ArtRave: The Artpop Ball	Lady Starlight	8,948 / 19,700	$708,509
2015	20 March	United States	Katy Perry	Prismatic World Tour	Charli XCX	18,396 / 19,920	$1,045,430
2015	10 June	United States	Foo Fighters	Sonic Highways World Tour	—N/a	22,000 / 22,000	—N/a
2015	7 July	United Kingdom	Paul McCartney	Out There! Tour	—N/a	15,700/ 15,700	—N/a
2016	4 March	United Kingdom	Ellie Goulding	Delirium World Tour	Sarah Hartman	16 000 / 16,000	—N/a
2016	1 May	United Kingdom	Adele	Adele Live 2016	—N/a	21,005 / 21,005	$1,785,430
2016	12 June	United Kingdom	Muse	Drones World Tour	The New Regime	17,748 / 17,748	$1,204,332
2016	15 June	United Kingdom	Iron Maiden	The Book of Souls World Tour	The Raven Age; Ghost	18,635 / 18,635	$1,416,976
2016	2 July	Barbados	Rihanna	Anti World Tour	Big Sean	17,000 / 17,000	—N/a
2016	8 September	United States	Red Hot Chili Peppers	The Getaway World Tour	Unknown		
2016	23 & 24 September	Canada	Justin Bieber	Purpose World Tour	The Knocks	45,234 / 45,234	$3,950,933
2017	23 February	Italy	Andrea Bocelli	Cinema World Tour	—N/a		
2017	5 March	Canada	Drake	Boy Meets World Tour	—N/a		
2017	10 March	United States	Avenged Sevenfold	The Stage 2017 Tour	Disturbed	—N/a	
2017	10 May	United States	Ariana Grande	Dangerous Woman Tour	Victoria Monét; Bia	12,129 / 12,412	$752,062
2017	19 May	Canada	Shawn Mendes	Illuminate World Tour	James TW	8,007 / 8,007	$700,236
2017	20 May	Germany	Hans Zimmer	Hans Zimmer Live	—N/a		
2017	24 May	United States	Bruno Mars	24K Magic World Tour		22,356 / 22,356	$1,693,662
2018	9 February	Norway	Kygo	Kids In Love Tour	TBA		
2018	23 February	United States	The Killers	Wonderful Wonderful World Tour	TBA		
2018	2 March	United States	Kendrick Lamar	The Damn Tour	James Blake	21,653 / 21,653	$1,786,295
2018	8 March	United States	The Chainsmokers	Memories Do Not Open Tour	TBA		
2018	17 March	Spain	Enrique Iglesias	Enrique Iglesias Live	TBA		
2018	23 April	United Kingdom	Sam Smith	The Thrill of It All Tour	TBA		
2018	2 May	United States	Metallica	WorldWired Tour	Kvelertak	24,836 / 24,836	$2,300,122
2018	2 August	United States	Justin Timberlake	Man of the Woods Tour	The Shadowboxers	15,409 / 15,409	$1,235,128
2018	10 August	United States	Britney Spears	Britney Spears: Piece of Me Tour	Pitbull	20,423 / 20,423	$1,838,111
2018	14 & 15 August	United Kingdom	Roger Waters	Us + Them Tour		33,596 / 38,808	$3,712,435
2019	9 February	United States	Twenty One Pilots	The Bandito Tour	—N/a		
2019	14 March	Italy	Andrea Bocelli	Andrea Bocelli in Concert	—N/a		
2019	5 August	United States	P!NK	Beautiful Trauma World Tour	Vance Joy; Bang Bang Romeo; KidCutUp	23,851 / 23,851	$2,511,154
2019	7 September	United Kingdom	Muse	Simulation Theory World Tour		12,666 / 18,461	$937,001
2019	3 October	United States	Ariana Grande	Sweetener World Tour	Social House; Ella Mai	23,911 / 23,911	$1,816,140
2019	24 October	Canada	Michael Bublé	Michael Bublé Tour 2019		15,896 / 15,896	$1,440,197
2022	21 & 22 May	United Kingdom	Elton John	Farewell Yellow Brick Road		38,989 / 38,989	$3,638,883
2022	1 July	United Kingdom	Harry Styles	Love on Tour	Wolf Alice	23,784 / 23,784	$2,089,269
2023	20 June	Canada	The Weeknd	After Hours til Dawn Tour	Kaytranada; Mike Dean	23,332 / 23,332	$1,919,784
2023	24 June	United Kingdom	Robbie Williams	XXV Tour	Lufthaus	—N/a	
2023	11 August	United Kingdom	Depeche Mode	Memento Mori World Tour	Hope	19,687 / 19,687	$2,190,885
2024	28 May	USA	Olivia Rodrigo	Guts Tour	Remi Wolf	23,565 / 23,565	$2,318,561
2024	8 November	Norway	Kygo	KYGO World Tour	Gryffin; Victoria Nadine	—N/a	
2025	30 March	USA	Sabrina Carpenter	Short n' Sweet Tour	Rachel Chinouriri		
2025	26 April	USA	Billie Eilish	Hit Me Hard and Soft: The Tour	Tom Odell		
2026	5 February	United Kingdom	Raye	This Tour May Contain New Music	Absolutely; Amma		
2026	16 April	Australia	5 Seconds of Summer	Everyone's a Star! World Tour	South Arcade; Master Peace		
2026	27 April	Australia	Tame Impala	Deadbeat Tour	RIP Magic		
2026	16 May	United Kingdom	Olivia Dean	The Art of Loving Live	Jalen Ngonda		
2026	10 June	USA	Foo Fighters	Take Cover Tour	Royel Otis; Otoboke Beaver		

== Other events ==
Other events at the venue include the Solberg Extreme Motorshow, Oslo International Horse Show and Sensation.

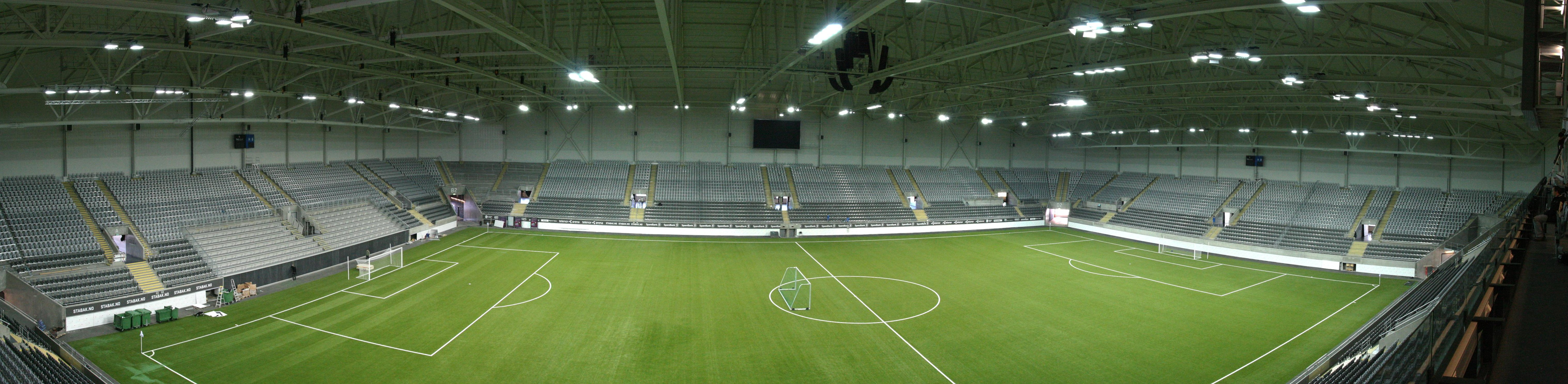
Inside Telenor Arena.

== See also ==
- List of indoor arenas in Norway
- List of indoor arenas in Nordic countries

== Bibliography ==
- Jensen, Ingebrigt Steen (2008). Alltid, uansett: om klokskapen og galskapen som må til for å skape eventyr (in Norwegian). Bærum: Dinamo Forlag. ISBN 9788280711977.

== Notes ==
Preceded by Olympic Indoor Arena; Moscow	Eurovision Song Contest; Venue; 2010	Succeeded by Esprit Arena; Düsseldorf
