= Stein Lier-Hansen =

Norwegian organizational director and politician

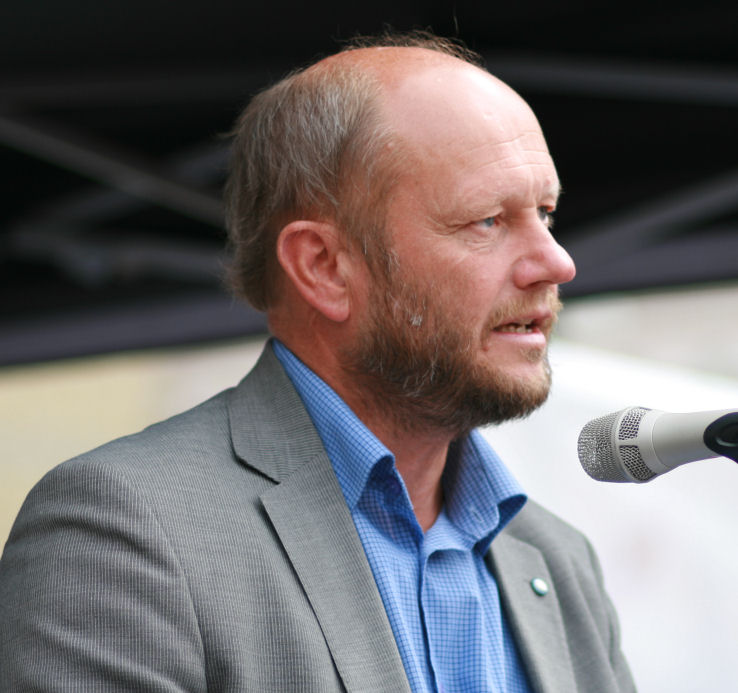
Stein Lier Hansen, summer 2007.

Stein Lier-Hansen (born 9 May 1955) is a Norwegian organizational director and politician for the Labour Party.

== Personal life ==
Lier-Hansen was born in Rjukan on 9 May 1955. He is a son of Knut Lier-Hansen.

== Career ==
From 1988 to 1993 he was the general secretary of the Norwegian Association of Hunters and Anglers, an organization with more than 100,000 members. He then became assisting director of the Norwegian Directorate for Nature Management in 1993, and director in 1995.

During Stoltenberg's First Cabinet, Lier-Hansen was appointed State Secretary in the Ministry of the Environment. He held the position until after the 2001 elections, which caused the cabinet to fall.

In 2004 he became CEO of the Federation of Norwegian Process Industries, named Federation of Norwegian Industries since a 2006 merger, an organization under the Confederation of Norwegian Enterprise umbrella. He succeeded Per Terje Vold.

== Selected books ==
- Storviltjakt (1983)
- Jegerprøveboka (1986, jointly with Bjørn Wegge)

Civic offices
Preceded by Peter Johan Schei	Director of the Norwegian Directorate for Nature Management; 1995–2000	Succeeded by Janne Sollie
