= Andreas Lauritz Thune =

Norwegian businessman

Andreas Lauritz Thune (9 April 1848 – 20 April 1920) was a Norwegian engineer and businessman. He was associated with the company Thunes Mekaniske Værksted.

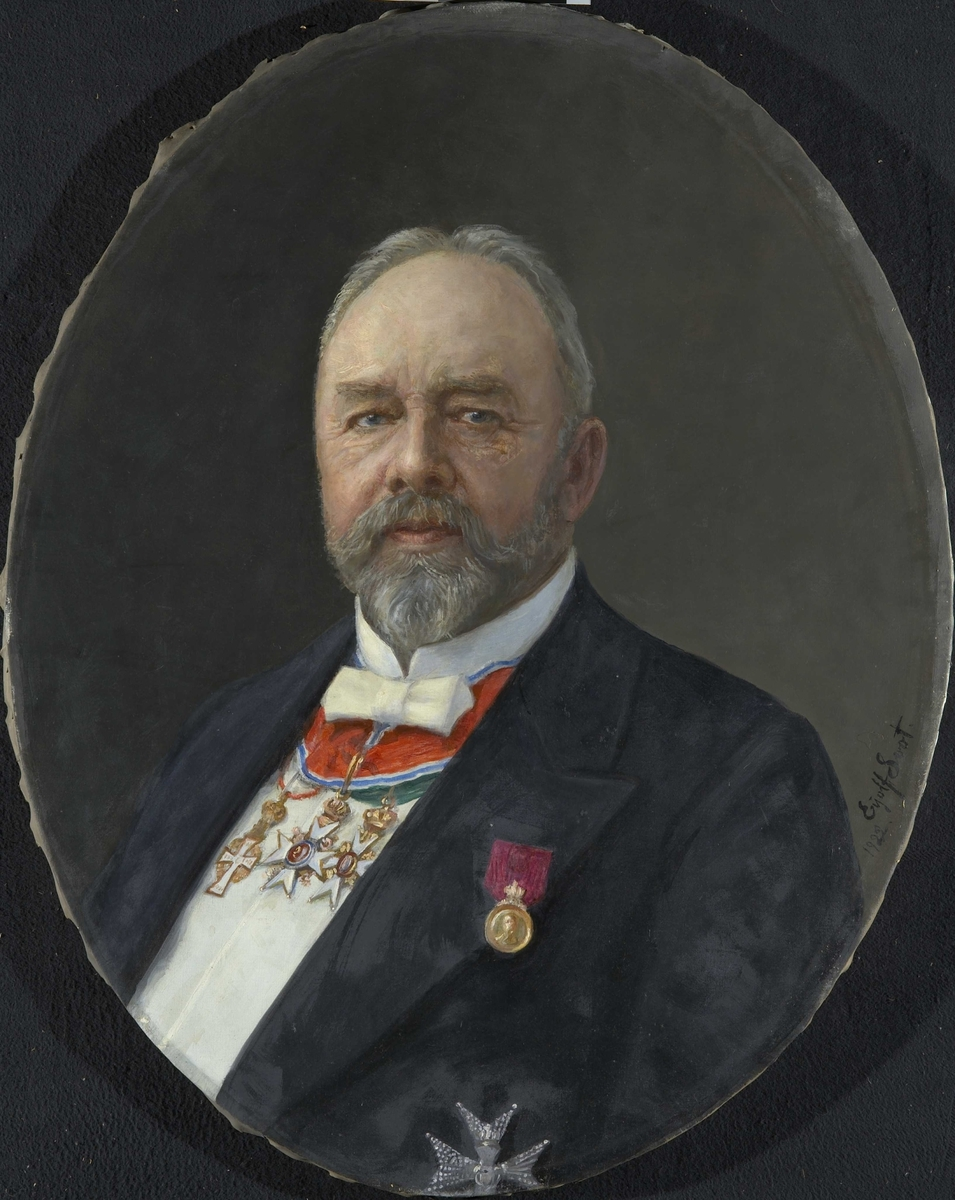
Andreas Lauritz Thune

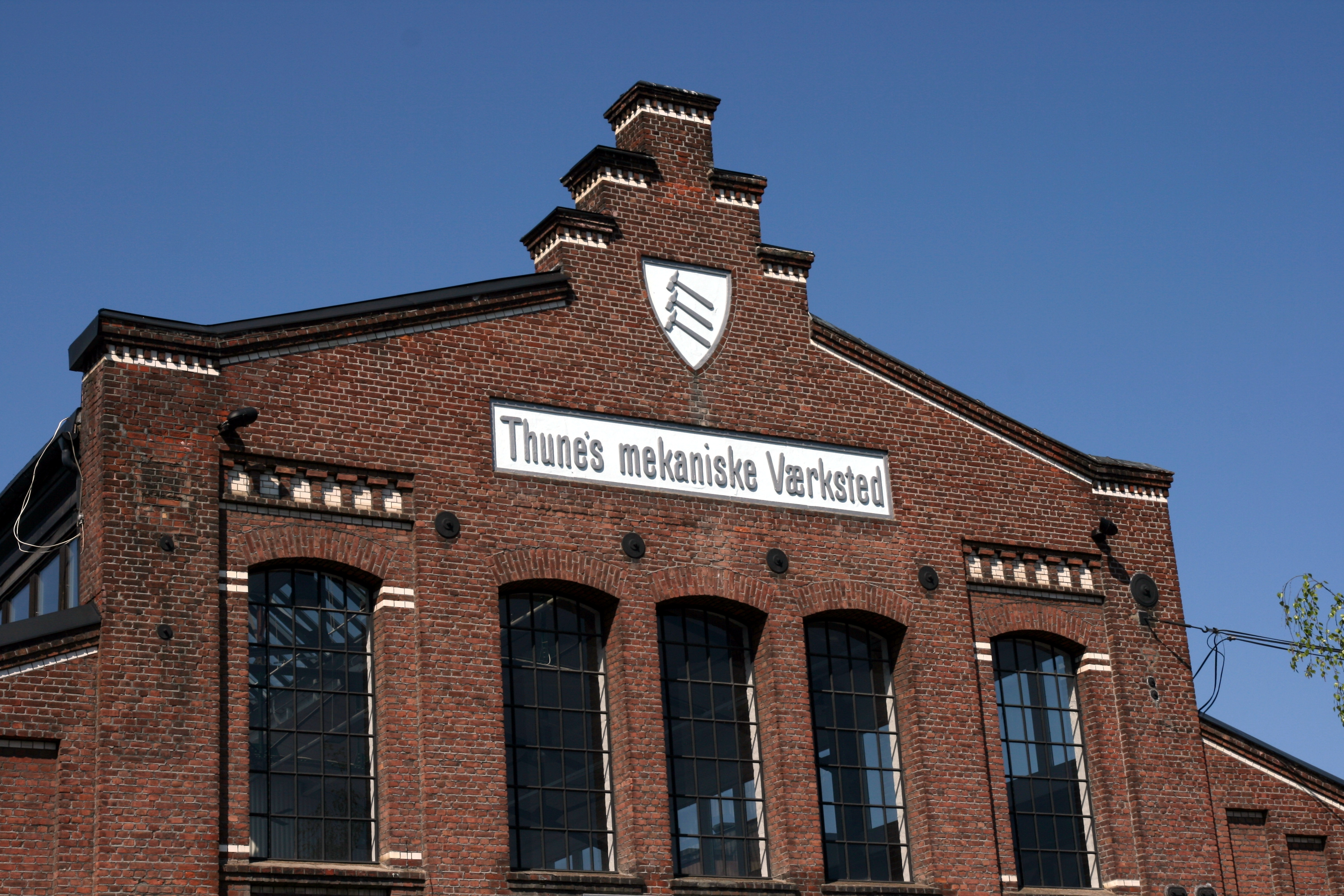
Thunes Mekaniske Værksted at Skøyen

== Biography ==
He was born at Drammen in Buskerud, Norway. His grandfather, Anders Paulsen Thune was a blacksmith by profession who had founded a workshop in that city in 1815. The workshop developed to the manufacturing company Thunes Mekaniske Værksted, or Thune for short. It moved to Kristiania (now Oslo) in 1851, with Andreas' father, Halvor Thune (1818–70), in charge.

Andreas Lauritz Thune graduated from Horten Technical College in 1868. He took over Thune in 1871, at the age of twenty-three, following the death of his father. At that time the production facilities were located in the downtown street Ruseløkkveien, but Andreas Thune moved to the nearby street Munkedamsveien. He started production of agricultural machinery and steam engines, and locomotive production began in the 1890s. Around the turn of the 20th century Thune became the most important locomotive manufacturer in Norway, along with Hamar Jernstøberi og Mekaniske Verksted. Between 1901 and 1920 these two manufacturers delivered about 250 locomotives to the Norwegian State Railways.

To allow this kind of production, the production facilities had moved to rural Skøyen, as the locale in Munkedamsveien became too small for large-scale industrial production, and expansion was physically difficult. Andreas Thune had bought the property Kjellebekk, near Skøyen Railway Station, and was personally registered as owner in the 1899 property valuation. Originally using the estate as a country house, he commenced the building of production halls in 1901 and moved in with the company. The next year his son, Sverre Thune (1877-1946), had completed technical studies in Germany and took over management.

In 1889 Andreas Thune had been among the founders of the employers' organization De Mekaniske Værksteders Forening. With the Norwegian Union of Iron and Metalworkers, a trade union which is now a part of the United Federation of Trade Unions, MVF negotiated Norway's first collective bargaining agreement in 1907. The name was changed to Mekaniske Værksteders Landsforening in 1908, and to Teknologibedriftenes Landsforening (Federation of Norwegian Manufacturing Industries) in 1989. Following a 2006 merger, it is now a part of the Federation of Norwegian Industries (Norsk Industri).

== Honors ==
Andreas Thune was appointed to Knight of St. Olav's Order in 1889 and Commander of the Order of St. Olav in 1897. He was also commander of the Order of the Dannebrog and the Order of Vasa and holder of the King's Medal of Merit in gold.

== Related reading ==
- Bjørnland, Dag (1977) Innenlands samferdsel i Norge siden 1800 (Oslo: Grøndahl) ISBN 82-504-0223-5
- Storrusten, Erling (1994) Langsomt ble reisene for alle : reiser og samferdsel i Norge 1869-1994 (Oslo: Norsk Reiseinformasjon AS) ISBN 82-762-8022-6
