= Agnar Tegnander =

Norwegian businessperson (1929–2019)

Agnar Rudolf Tegnander (20 October 1929 – 26 August 2019) was a Norwegian businessperson.

== Life and career ==
Tegnander was hired in the company Intra in the early 1950s, and eventually advanced to become chief executive officer of the kitchen and bathroom sink producer. He later let descendants take over, but was the company's chair until November 2007, when the company was sold to Teka Industrial. Tegnander has a fortune of about $3.75 million.

In 1989 he became deputy chair of the Federation of Norwegian Manufacturing Industries; then advanced to chair after half a year as Diderik Schnitler left the organization. He was succeeded in 1991.

Tegnander died at a hospital in Trondheim, on 29 August 2019, at the age of 89.

Business positions
Preceded by Diderik Schnitler	Chair of the Federation of Norwegian Manufacturing Industries; 1989–1991	Succeeded by Jan T. Jørgensen
