= Storhamar =

Neighborhood of Hamar, Norway

Coordinates: 60°47′42″N 11°02′50″E

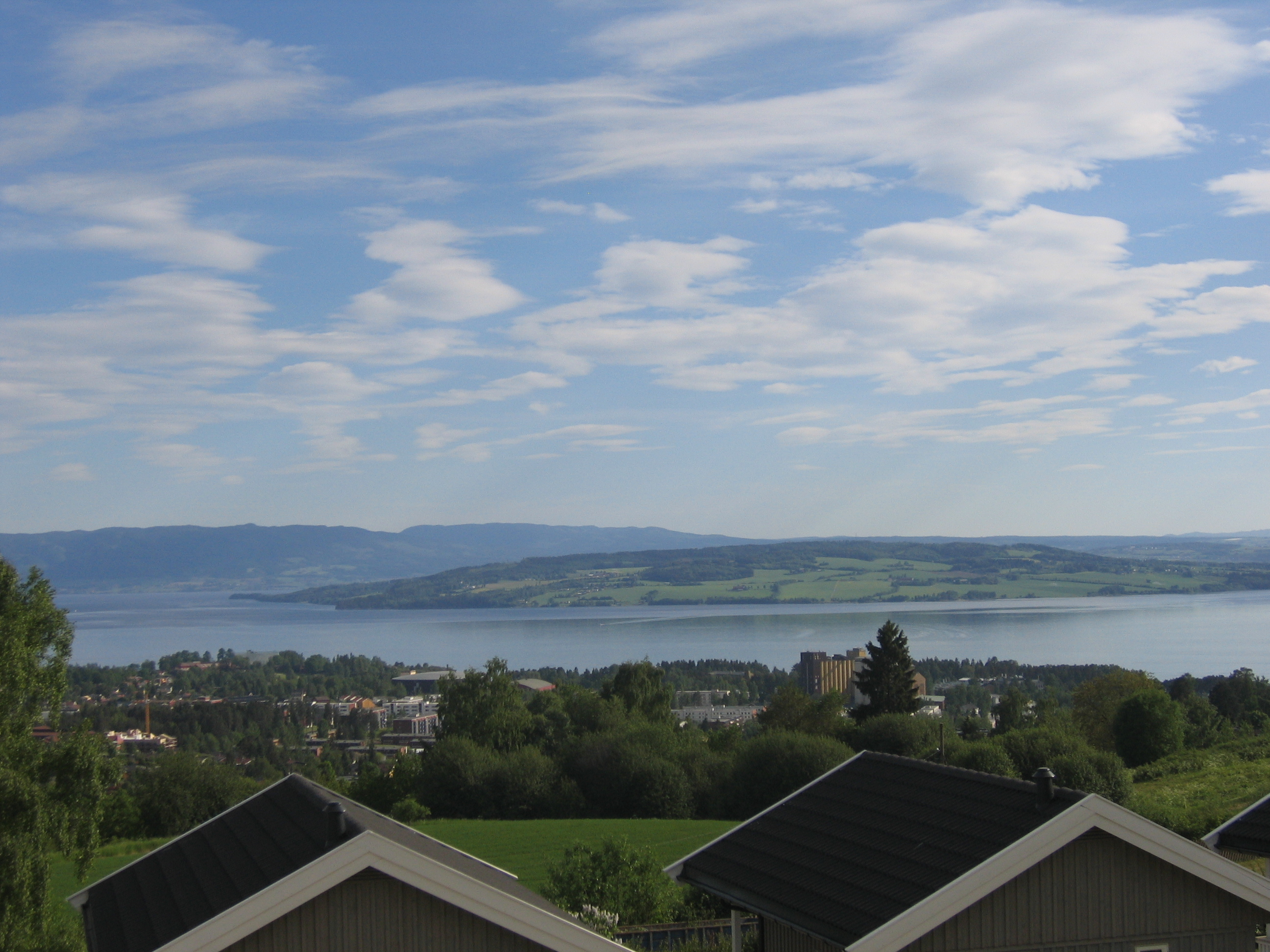
Overview of Helgøya, lake Mjøsa and Hamar west

Storhamar is a neighborhood in the city of Hamar which is located within Hamar Municipality in Innlandet county, Norway. This neighborhood is west of the town center and formerly part of the old Vang Municipality which merged into Hamar Municipality in 1992. It is the location of the distillery Arcus, the national lottery Norsk Tipping and the Hamar Olympic Amphitheatre sports venue. Norwegian sports club Storhamar IL comes from the area.
