= Diderik Schnitler =

Norwegian businessperson (born 1946)

Diderik Børsting Schnitler (born 23 October 1946) is a Norwegian businessperson.

He hails from Stabekk, and in his younger days he was the treasurer and an active tennis player for Stabekk TK. He graduated from the Norwegian Institute of Technology with a Bachelor of Science degree in 1970. He was hired as an engineer in Jarlsø Støperi in 1974, and was chief executive from 1976 to 1983. He was the chief executive officer of Kaldnes from 1983 to 1986 and EB Anker Sønnak from 1986 to 1989. In the 1980s he was a board member of Larvik Jernstøperi, Vestfold Jernlager, EB Consultants and Scanmar and chair of Sandefjord Airport.

He was elected leader of the Federation of Norwegian Manufacturing Industries in 1989. He left that position already in October 1989. After the 1989 Norwegian parliamentary election, Syse's Cabinet assumed office, and Schnitler was appointed State Secretary in the Ministry of Industry. He belonged to the Conservative Party. He lost that job in 1990 when Syse's Cabinet fell, but immediately became president of Kværner Shipbuilding and vice president of the Kværner Group. He also served as president of the Confederation of Norwegian Enterprise from 1994 to 1996. From 1998 to 2000 he was the CEO of Saga Petroleum; he stepped down to become a professional board member. His period with Saga was disastrous for the company, after a series of unfavorable financial dispositions, and the company ceased to exist and was acquired by Norsk Hydro.

Since 2002 he has chaired the board of the global shipping company Wilh. Wilhelmsen. In 2009 he became chair of Stabæk Holding.

He is a fellow of the Norwegian Academy of Technological Sciences.

Business positions
Preceded by Karl Glad	President of the Federation of Norwegian Manufacturing Industries; 1989	Succeeded by Agnar Tegnander
Preceded by Svein Aaser	President of the Confederation of Norwegian Enterprise; 1994–1996	Succeeded by Leif Frode Onarheim
