= Norwegian Directorate for Nature Management =

Norway's national governmental body for preserving natural environment

- Direktoratet for naturforvaltning

Agency overview
- Headquarters: Trondheim
- Employees: 354
- Parent agency: Norwegian Ministry of the Environment

The Norwegian Directorate for Nature Management (Norwegian: Direktoratet for naturforvaltning, DN) was Norway's national governmental body for preserving Norway's natural environment, including establishing and regulating national parks and other protected areas until 2013 when it was merged into the Norwegian Environment Agency. The organization was based in Trondheim and employed about 330 employees.

The directorate's stated mission was "to preserve biological diversity and strengthen the common right of access to the countryside".

It concerned itself with designating areas for protection, monitoring and preserving biological diversity, as well as setting and enforcing fish and hunting quotas.

== Directors ==
- Helge Vikan (1985–1988)
- Peter Johan Schei (1989–1995)
- Stein Lier-Hansen (1995–2000)
- Janne Sollie (2001–2013)
