= Janne Sollie =

Norwegian civil servant (born 1959)

Janne Sollie (born 27 March 1959) is a Norwegian civil servant.

Born in Trondheim, she graduated from the Norwegian College of Agriculture in 1985, taking a sivilagronom degree. She was hired in the Norwegian Pollution Control Authority as a head of department in 1987. From 1990 to 1991 she worked as an advisor in the Ministry of the Environment. She then returned to the Pollution Control Authority, advancing to head of department. In 2001 she was hired as the first female director of the Norwegian Directorate for Nature Management, serving until it became merged with another directorate in 2013. In her position, Sollie became known as a vocal critic of several growth-based enterprises along Norway's coast. In 2007, she took sides in the public debate on opening Lofoten and Vesterålen and Senja for petroleum activity, which she opposed. In 2010, both the parliamentary opposition and parts of the government, namely the Centre Party, "lost confidence" in Sollie following a debate on the status of Norway's nature types. The Minister of the Environment stood behind her, however. The same criticism fell when she warned against salmon farming in the same year.

In 2013, Sollie eventually became CEO of the public transport company AtB. In 2022, the board decided to hire a new chief executive. Another person would be acting director until the company could hire a new one.

== Personal life ==
She grew up in the borough Byåsen, and also lived there as an adult until she moved to a farm in Stjørdal. She is an identical twin and got two daughters.

Civic offices
Preceded by Stein Lier-Hansen	Director of the Norwegian Directorate for Nature Management; 2001–2013	Succeeded by position abolished
