= HRTB =

Norwegian architecture firm

HRTB AS is an architecture firm based in Oslo, Norway. It was established in 1998 as a continuation of Arkitektkontoret Hultberg, Resen, Throne-Holst og Boguslawski, which was established in 1961. The firm has three partners: Kjell Beite, Harald Lone, and Ola Mowé.

Major works include Telenor Arena, Hamar Olympic Amphitheatre, the main building for the University of Stavanger, the Akershus University College campus, the 2003 upgrades to Postgirobygget, Statoil's head office, several buildings at Oslo Airport, Gardermoen, and parts of Oslo Central Station.
