= CC Amfi =

Sports arena in Hamar, Norway

- Fjøset ("The Barn")
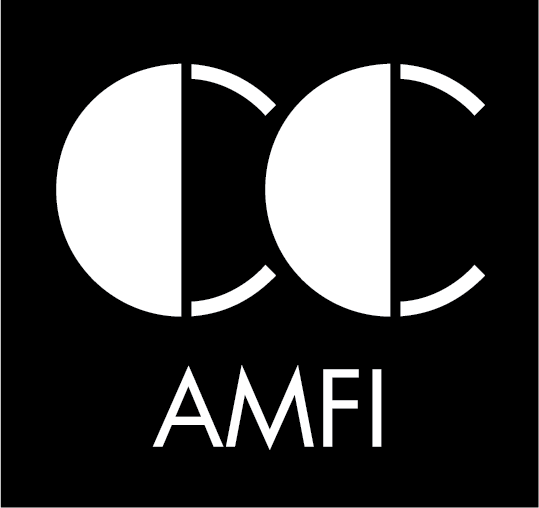

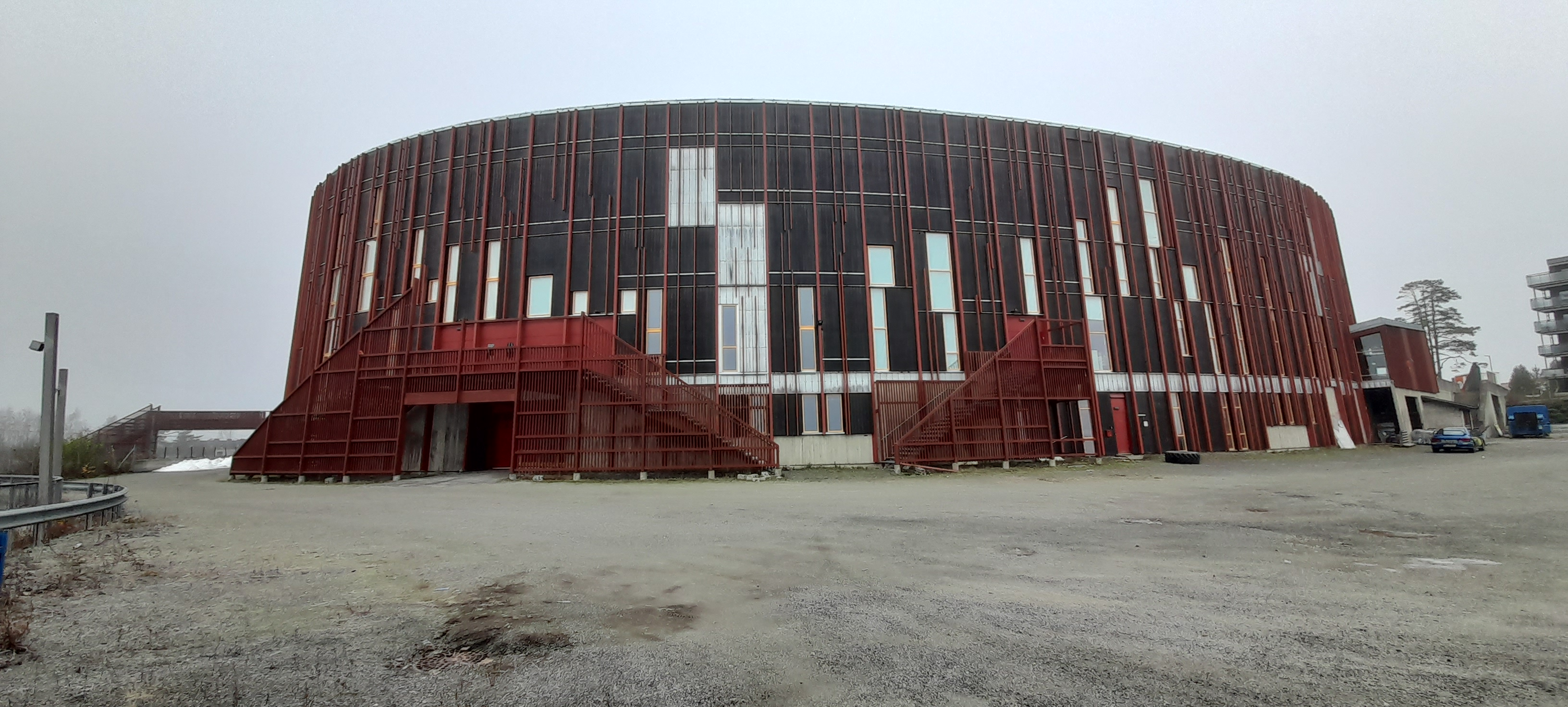
- CC Amfi in November 2021
- Interactive map of CC Amfi
- Full name: Nordlyshallen
- Former names: Hamar Olympic Amphitheatre (1992–2015)
- Location: Storhamar, Hamar, Norway
- Coordinates: 60°48′04″N 11°02′18″E
- Owner: Hamar Municipality
- Operator: Hamar Olympiske Anlegg
- Capacity: 7,500
- Public transit: Bus: Line B2

Construction
- Opened: 25 November 1992
- Cost: 83 million kr
- Architect: HRTB

Tenants
- Storhamar Ishockey (1992–present); Storhamar Yngres (2016–present)

CC Amfi, also known as Nordlyshallen ("The Northern Light Hall"), is an indoor sports arena in Hamar, Norway. It is mostly used for ice hockey and is the home arena of Storhamar Hockey. It has also been used for short track speed skating, figure skating, handball, events and concerts. The venue has a capacity for 7,000 spectators and was built for the 1994 Winter Olympics, where it was used for short track speed skating and figure skating. Other major events held at the arena include the 1999 IIHF World Championship in ice hockey, the 1999 World Women's Handball Championship, the 2012 IPC Ice Sledge Hockey World Championships and the 2016 Winter Youth Olympics.

Construction of CC Amfi started in August 1991 and it was inaugurated on 25 November 1992, with construction costing 83 million Norwegian krone (NOK). The venues are owned by Hamar Olympiske Anlegg, a subsidiary of Hamar Municipality.

== History ==
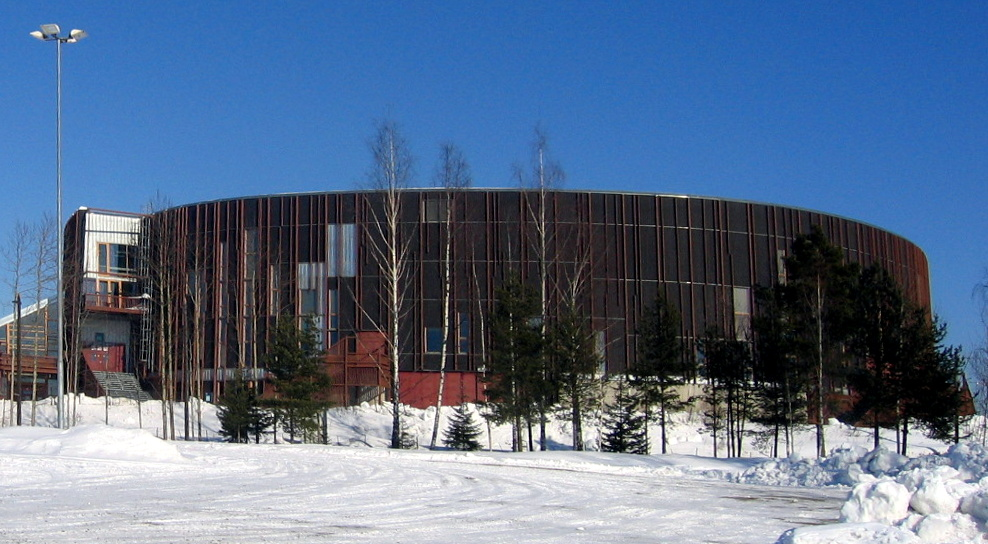
March 2006 exterior view of Hamar Olympic Amphitheatre

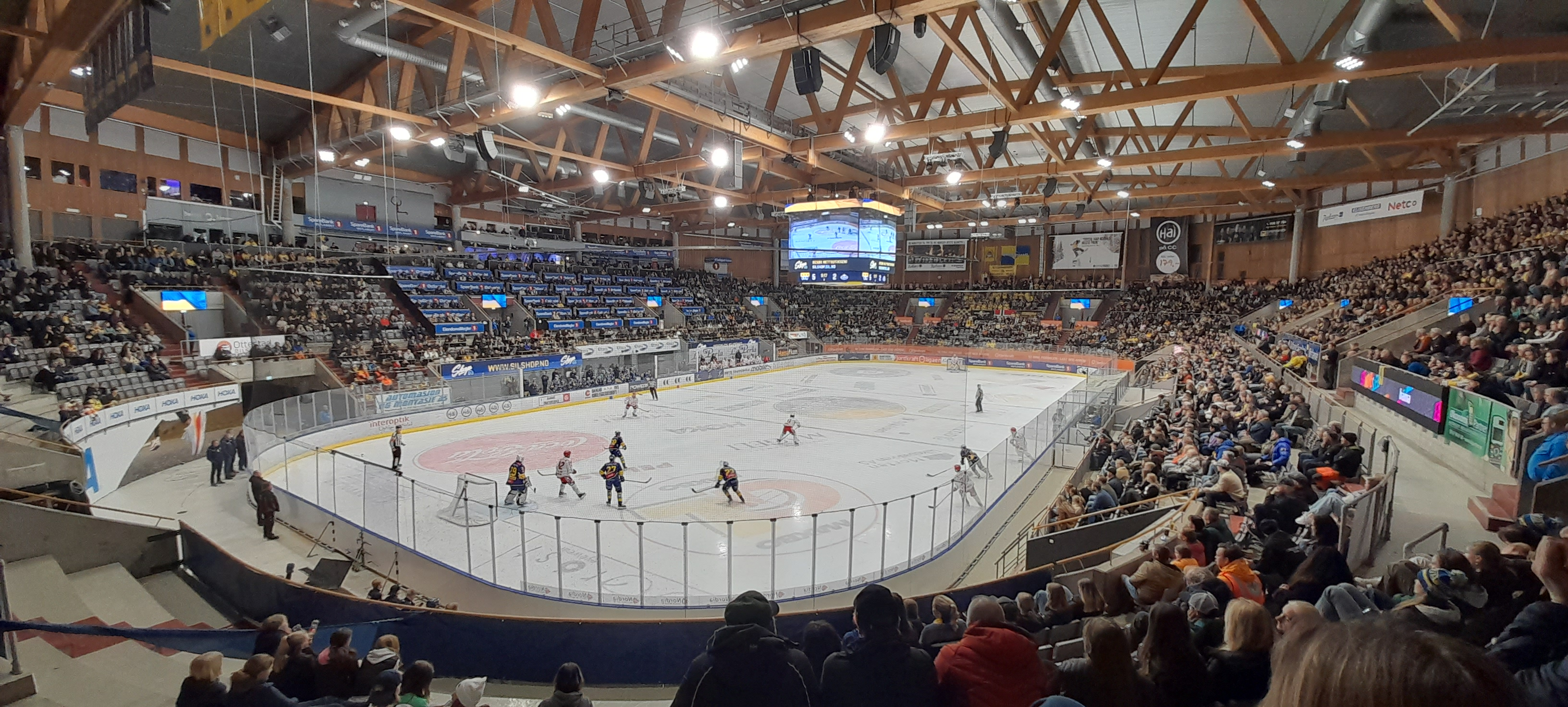
Interior view of the arena (2022)

=== The Olympic venue ===
In the unsuccessful Lillehammer bid for the 1992 Winter Olympics, ice hockey events were proposed played in Hamar and Gjøvik. However, in the Lillehammer bid for the 1994 Winter Olympics, all ice events were moved to Lillehammer proper, after recommendations from the International Ice Hockey Federation, who wanted all the ice hockey events to take place in the same town. This would involve building two temporary ice rinks at Stampesletta in Lillehammer, and after the Olympics moving them to Gjøvik and either Moelv, Brumunddal or Kongsvinger. By 1989, the International Olympic Committee (IOC) decided to include short-track speed skating, increasing the number of ice halls from two to three. In April, the Lillehammer Olympic Organizing Committee (LOOC) therefore proposed building permanent ice rinks in Hamar and Gjøvik.

The IOC also required that the long-track speed skating be done indoors. Hamar was awarded the venue, Vikingskipet, after Hamar Municipality guaranteed to cover all costs exceeding NOK 200 million. This provided sufficient leverage for Hamar to host additional events. LOOC approved the construction of Vikingskipet in on 15 December 1989 and at the same time supported proposals to renovate Storhamar Ishall to host Olympic ice hockey matches. A second, temporary training rink was also planned built in Hamar. In addition, the Hamar venue would be used for short track speed skating, while figure skating would be run in Lillehammer. In March, the plans were changed, so Hamar would receive an all-new ice rink in addition to a renovation of Storhamar Ishall.

Financing of the venue was officially granted by the Parliament of Norway in April 1990. The International Skating Union wanted to locate all skating in Hamar, and in October 1990, LOOC confirmed that they would reallocate the events so that all the all skating events would take place in Hamar, and that a separate Olympic Village would be built in Hamar for skaters. The original plans for the Olympic Amphitheatre called for a capacity for 4,500 and construction to cost NOK 65. By June 1991, LOOC decided to increase the size of the venue, as IOC would only allow the venue host figure skating if its spectator capacity was raised to 6,000. Financing of the expansion was granted in August, with the cost rising to NOK 83.3 million. Early plans called for the venue to be built in concrete, but a research project coordinated by the Norwegian Institute of Technology made it possible to cover the venue's exterior and interior in wood panel. This solution was hailed as aesthetical by architects, and as a technical innovation by the Norwegian construction industry.

The contract to build the venue was awarded to Martin M. Bakken, a local contractor, and construction started in August 1991. The laminated wood beams for the roof were delivered by Moelven Industrier.

Ice was laid on the 12 November 1992 and the arena was officially completed on 1 December. The opening show took place already on 25 November and the first official match, between Storhamar and Stjernen, took place on 8 December. The venue was the 26th indoor ice hockey arena in Norway. After the Olympic arena was built, Storhamar Ishall was renovated, and the spectator capacity reduced through the construction of storage facilities and VIP areas. The Olympic Amphitheatre later installed Norway's first media cube in 2004.

The arena was formerly known as Hamar Olympic Amphitheatre (Norwegian: Hamar OL-Amfi or Hamar Olympiske Amfi) until October 2015, when CC bought the naming rights for the arena. A new media cube was also installed as part of the deal.

=== Storhamar Ishall ===
Storhamar Ishall
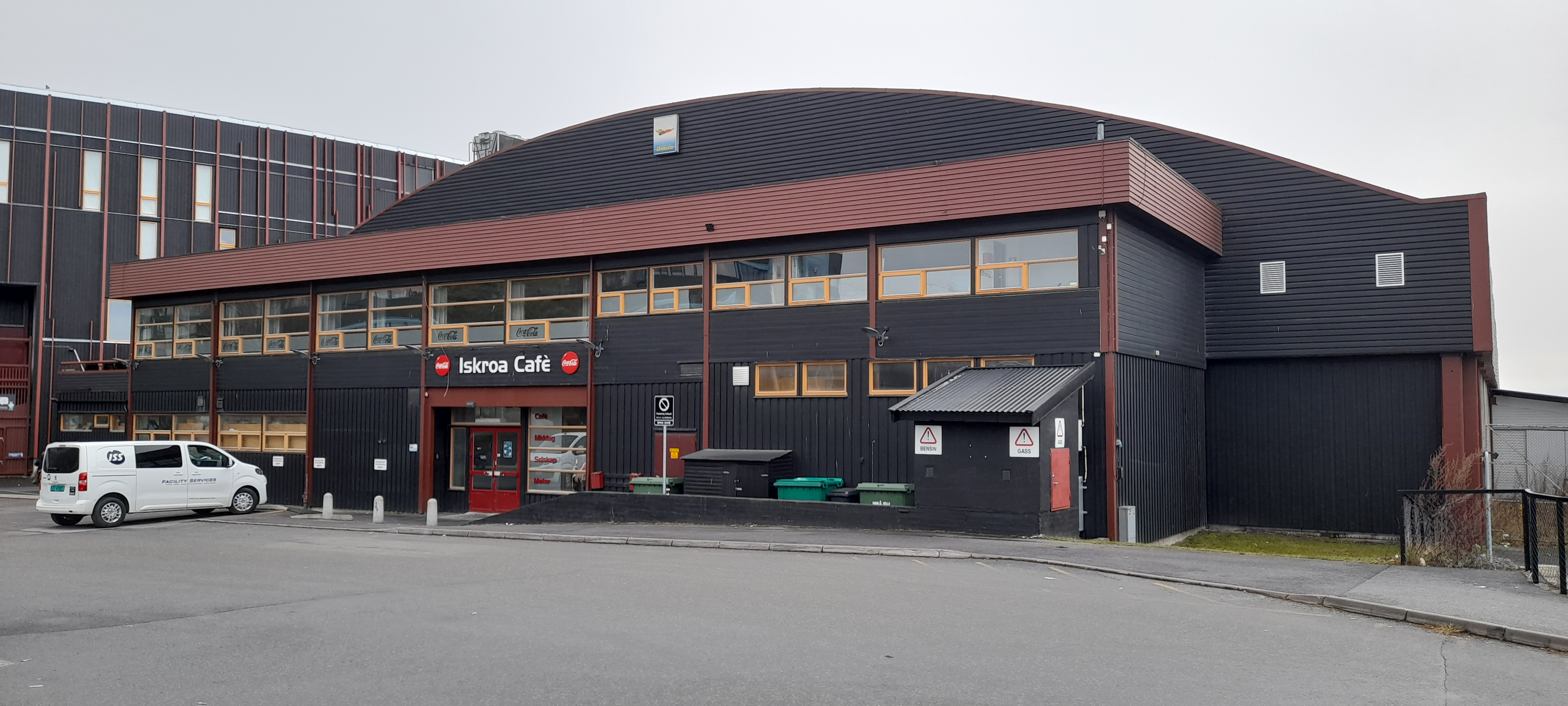
- Entrance to Storhamar Ishall in November 2021
- Interactive map of Storhamar Ishall
- Location: Storhamar, Hamar, Norway
- Owner: Hamar Municipality
- Operator: Hamar Olympiske Anlegg
- Capacity: 1,200

Construction
- Opened: August 1981
- Architect: HRTB

Tenants
- Storhamar IL (1992-present); 2016 Winter Youth Olympics

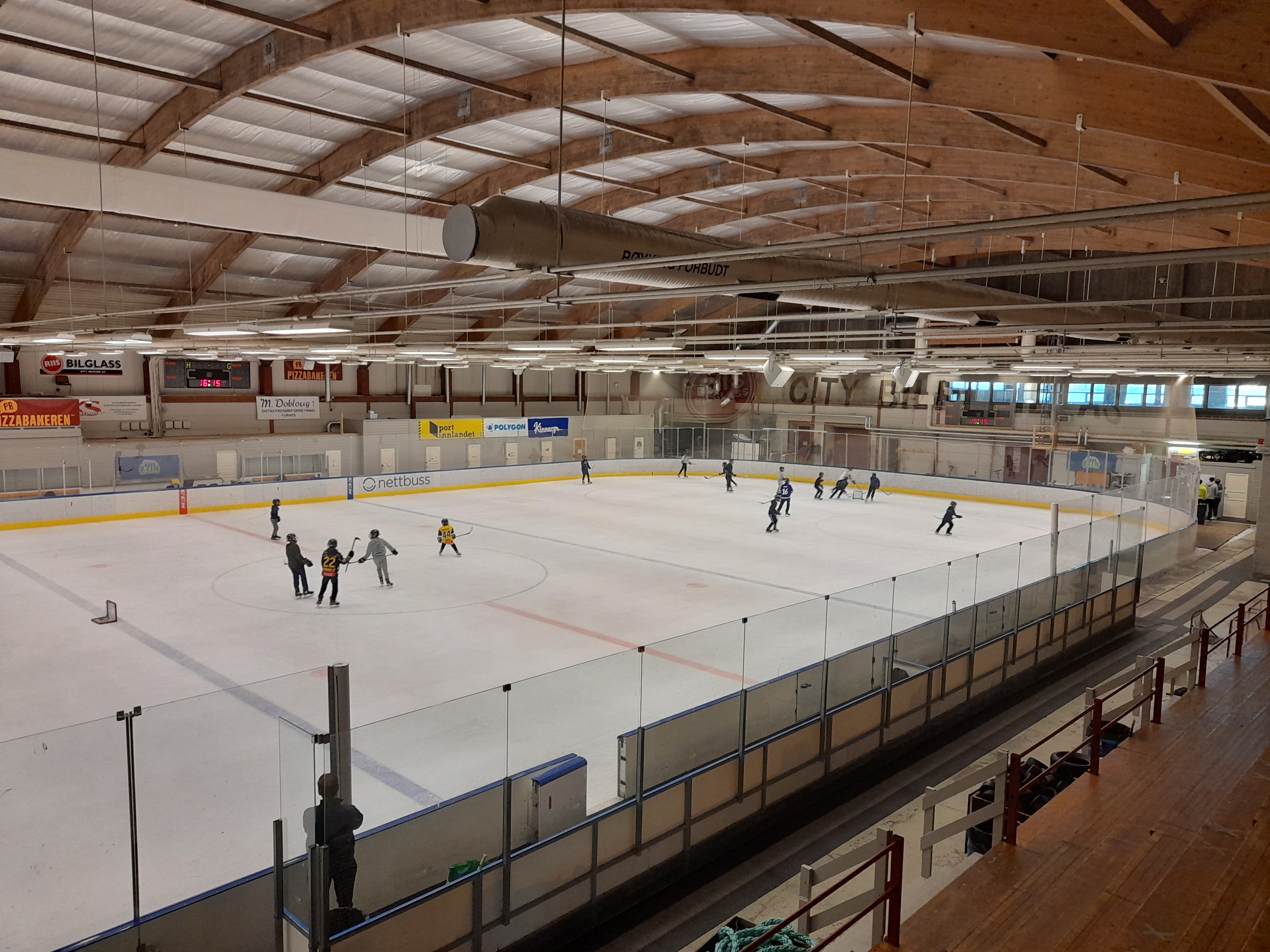
Storhamar Ishall in November 2021

Adjacent to the Olympic venue lays Storhamar Ishall. Solely used for ice hockey, it opened in 1981 and has a capacity for 1,200. Since the opening of the Olympic venue, Storhamar Ishall has been used for training, and the two rinks share common dressing rooms and other facilities.

The sport of ice hockey was taken up by Storhamar IL after the 1952 Winter Olympics in Oslo spurred the public interest in the sport. The pitch used by the club for summer sports was iced for the winter and surrounded with 15-centimeter (5.9 in) tall wooden boards. As the club established an ice hockey section in 1955 it received funding from the Norwegian Ice Hockey Federation to purchase 120-centimeter (47 in) tall boards. The pitch was renovated for NOK 4,000 in 1957, financed through a municipal grant. Among the upgrades was insulation of the club house, which was a barracks stemming from the Second World War. A contractor who had a storage facility close by, kept receiving visits from juveniles who jumped the fence and took material for the work. He eventually visited the club house and supplied them with a key to the facility, somewhat involuntarily becoming the club's first sponsor.

Storhamar traditionally played ice hockey on natural ice. In 1977, the club was promoted to the First Division, where the regulations required that the team play on artificial ice. To avoid having to play all their games on the road, the municipality agreed to finance an outdoor artificial rink at Storhamar. With the increased attendance and interest for hockey following the town's team playing in the top league, Storhamar started planning an indoor venue.

State grants and a municipal guarantee were secured in 1980, with construction starting in the fall. The arena was built around the existing artificial rink. Because the hall could not be completed in time for the 1980–81 season, Storhamar was permitted to play the season in the Second Division. Storhamar Ishall became the 11th indoor ice hockey rink in Norway when it opened in August 1981. The venue was to be partially financed through renting it out during the summer, including to an annual town fair. These ideas fell through and the municipality was forced to take over the venue.

== Facilities ==
The twin areas are located at Storhamar, a residential area west of the town center of Hamar. Similar to Vikingskipet, the venue has two official names, Hamar Olympic Amphitheatre and Nordlyshallen. The former cannot be used commercially by non-Olympic events, such as in merchandise. The venue is owned by the municipally owned entity called Hamar Olympiske Anlegg, which also owns and operates Vikingskipet. The operating deficits are covered by a post-Olympic capital fund, which in the case of the two Hamar venues was NOK 60 million. Only the interest of these funds is used to operate the facilities, unlike Lillehammer and Gjøvik which also derive fundings from their base capital. Owing to the fund, Hamar Municipality does not need to give municipal grants to operate the facilities.

Hamar Olympic Amphitheatre is oval and has wood as the main construction material, both for the interior and the exterior. Overall it is 95 meters (312 ft) long, 75 meters (246 ft) wide and 22 meters (72 ft) tall. Architect Ola Mowè of HRTB chose the shape to connect various spatial designs and types of buildings in the neighborhood. The dark color was chosen to counteract the otherwise lively array of colors in the surroundings. The roof was built using laminated wood lattice girders. The longest beam span is 70 meters (230 ft). The exterior walls are clad with boards, panels and decorative molding. The interior wall are covered with pine panel.

The surface area of the building is 11,000 square meters (120,000 sq ft), of which 7,000 square meters (75,000 sq ft) is on the ground floor. When used for ice hockey, the venue has an official spectator capacity for 7,000. When used for handball the capacity is 6,480. Storhamar Ishall has standing-only capacity for 1,500 spectators. During the Olympics, the main hall had 330 VIP seats, 60 seats for commentators and 200 press seats. The main rink had a new media cube installed in 2016.

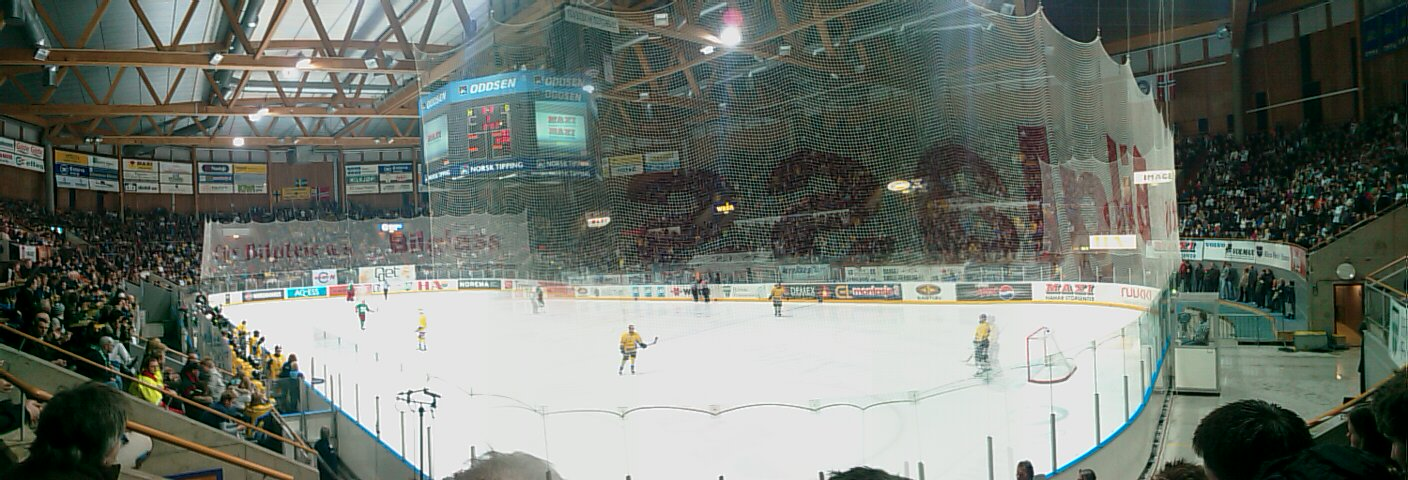
Storhamar Dragons playing Frisk Tigers during the 2007–08 Norwegian Play-Off Finals

== Events ==
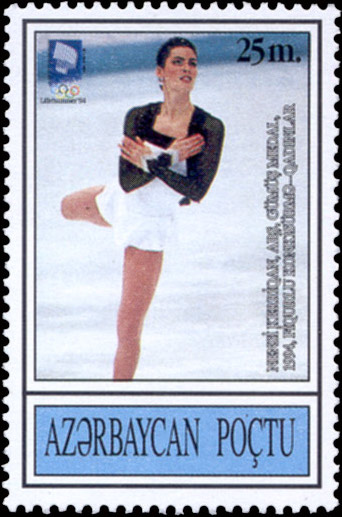
Nancy Kerrigan during the 1994 Winter Olympics

=== Olympics ===
During the 1994 Winter Olympics, Hamar Olympic Amphitheatre was used for figure skating and short track speed skating. It hosted 13 events, drawing an average of 5,554 spectators. Storhamar Ishall was used for warming up and training to these events.

Short track speed skating was dominated by South Korea, who won four of the six events. Chae Ji-Hoon won the men's 500 meters and Kim Ki-Hoon the 1000 meters, while the men's 5000 meter relay was won by Italy. Cathy Turner defended her 1992 gold on the 500 meters, while Chun Lee-Kyung won the women's 1000 meters and South Korea won the 3000 meter relay. At 13, Kim Yoon-Mi became the world's youngest Olympic gold medalist.

In figure skating, relaxation of the amateurism rules led to several former stars returning. The ladies' singles has resulted in the as-yet highest United States Winter Olympic television viewership, thanks to Tonya Harding's ex-husband Jeff Gillooly hiring Shane Stant to club fellow female figure skater Nancy Kerrigan in the knee. The ladies' singles was won by Ukraine's Oksana Baiul, while the men's singles was won by Russia's Alexei Urmanov, the ice dancing was won by Russians Oksana Grishuk and Evgeny Platov and the pair skating was won by Russians Ekaterina Gordeeva and Sergei Grinkov.

=== Ice hockey ===
The Olympic Amphitheatre is the home venue of Storhamar Hockey, formerly known as the Storhamar Dragons, the ice hockey division of Storhamar IL. The clubs' youth groups train in Storhamar Ishall, which is also used by the club's bandy group. The Dragons have played continuously in the Elite League since the 1982–83 season. Their highest average league attendance was in the 1994–95 season, when they drew 3,731 spectators. While playing in Storhamar Ishall, the highest average attendance was in the 1984–85 season, with 2,097 spectators. From the 1991–92 to the following season, when the Olympic venue opened, the Dragons' average attendance doubled, from 1,412 to 2,875. The Dragons' best attendance is 7,405, set during game seven of the 2004–05 Playoffs, where the Dragons beat Vålerenga in overtime.

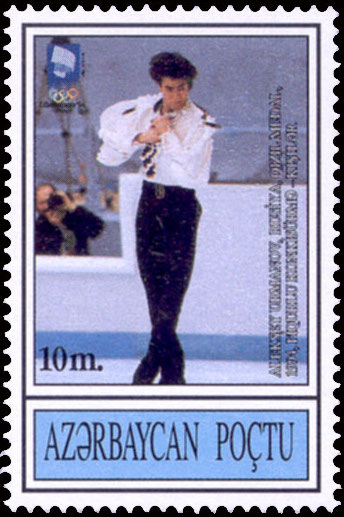
Alexei Urmanov during the 1994 Winter Olympics

After the opening of Storhamar Ishall, it was used for two Norway men's national ice hockey team matches. On 2 January 1982, Norway lost 3–5 against Romania; and on 13 September 1983, Norway beat Italy 4–2. The venue hosted, along with Lillehammer, Group A of the 1992 IIHF European U18 Championship. Norway's senior inaugural international match at the Olympic arena saw Norway lose 4–6 against Canada on 9 February 1993. The 1999 IIHF World Championship in ice hockey was hosted at Hamar Olympic Amphitheatre, Håkons Hall in Lillehammer and Jordal Amfi in Oslo. Fourteen group-stage matches were held in Hamar.

==== The longest game ====
On 12 March 2017 Storhamar hosted the Sparta Warriors in game five of the quarter finals in the Elite league. The game lasted for 217 minutes and 14 seconds in what is believed to be the longest hockey game in history. Joakim Jensen scored the game-winning goal as Storhamar won 2-1 after nearly 11 periods of play.

=== In fiction ===
In the film, I, Tonya, the scenes which take place in CC Amfi have not been shot in Hamar, but in the Macon Coliseum in Macon, Georgia.

=== Other events ===
Storhamar Ishall is the regular training venue for Storhamar IL's figure skating group. Between them, the two venues have hosted the Norwegian Figure Skating Championships three times: Storhamar Ishall in 1983, and the Olympic Amphitheatre in 2005 and 2011. In October 1993, the Olympic Amphitheatre hosted Piruetten 1993, a pre-Olympic figure skating event. Although featuring stars such as Nancy Kerrigan, it only attracted 150 spectators. The venue has hosted the ISU Junior Grand Prix in 1999–2000 and 2000–01 and the World Junior Figure Skating Championships in 2002.

Storhamar Ishall hosted Norway's first international short track speed skating event in November 1991. The 1995 World Short Track Speed Skating Championships were scheduled to take place at the arena, but were moved to Gjøvik Olympic Cavern Hall because the Hamar venue would be used by Storhamar Dragons for the play-offs. The Olympic Amphitheatre has hosted matches of the Norway men's national handball team, with the first tournament being played in January 1993. It has also been used for Norway women's national handball team matches. The venue was one of seven venues used for the 1999 World Women's Handball Championship. Between 2 and 9 December, it hosted nine group-stage matches and three of the quarter-finals. The venue was also the site of two matches during Møbelringen Cup 2006. In September 2007, the Olympic arena hosted Fédération Cynologique Internationale's world championship in dog agility. The 2012 IPC Ice Sledge Hockey World Championships took place at the Olympic Amphitheatre. Lillehammer hosted the 2016 Winter Youth Olympics, with Hamar Olympic Amphitheatre being the venue for the figure skating events.

Since 2001, Hamar Olympic Amphitreatre has hosted the annual Idrettsgallaen, a television show that honors the past year's Norwegian sports and athlete achievements. Hamar was selected to host the event because its main sponsor, the national lottery company Norsk Tipping, has its head office in Hamar. Idrettsgallaen is held in early January, when many of winter sports athletes are home and the summer athletes are off season. In 2010, Idrettsgallaen was hosted in Lillehammer because the weekend clashed with the 2010 European Speed Skating Championships in Vikingskipet and Hamar lacks sufficient hotel capacity to host both simultaneously. Concerts hosted at the arena since the opening concert with Fats Domino on 25 November 1992 include Little Richard in 1993, Vamp in 2005, Willie Nelson in 2008 and José Carreras in 2010.

== See also ==
- List of indoor arenas in Norway
- List of indoor arenas in Nordic countries
