= Peter Johan Schei =

Norwegian biologist and civil servant (1945–2022)

Peter Johan Schei (5 January 1945 - 7 April 2022) was a Norwegian biologist and civil servant.

He was cand.real. by education. From 1989 to 1995 he served as director of the Norwegian Directorate for Nature Management after four years as assisting director from 1985 to 1989. From 2004 to 2012 he was director of the Fridtjof Nansen Institute in Oslo.

Preceded by Helge Vikan	Director of the Norwegian Directorate for Nature Management; 1989–1995	Succeeded by Stein Lier-Hansen
