= Euforum Holding =

Norwegian holding company

Euforum Holding AS is a Norwegian holding company.

It was started as Stabæk Holding in December 2005 and formally registered (in the Brønnøysund Register Centre) in January 2006. It later took the name Euforum Holding. The company owned Stabæk Fotball until the football club was sold to investors in 2009, and owns the indoor venue Telenor Arena which was inaugurated in 2009, and hosted Norwegian Premier League football, concerts and events such as the 2010 Eurovision Song Contest. The main owner of the company itself is Kjell Christian Ulrichsen. Lars Holter-Sørensen was chair of the company until 2009, when Diderik Schnitler took over. The company headquarters are at Telenor Arena.
