= Smith Stål Øst =

Norwegian steel and iron wholesaler

Smith Stål Øst AS is a Norwegian wholesaler of steel and iron.

It was founded as Vestfold Jernlager in 1962 by Odd Lauritzen. It changed its name after being bought by the corporation E. A. Smith. The company is located in Holmestrand with business headquarters and warehouses, and trades steel and iron mainly in Eastern Norway.
