= Luxury box =

Class of seating in arena or stadium

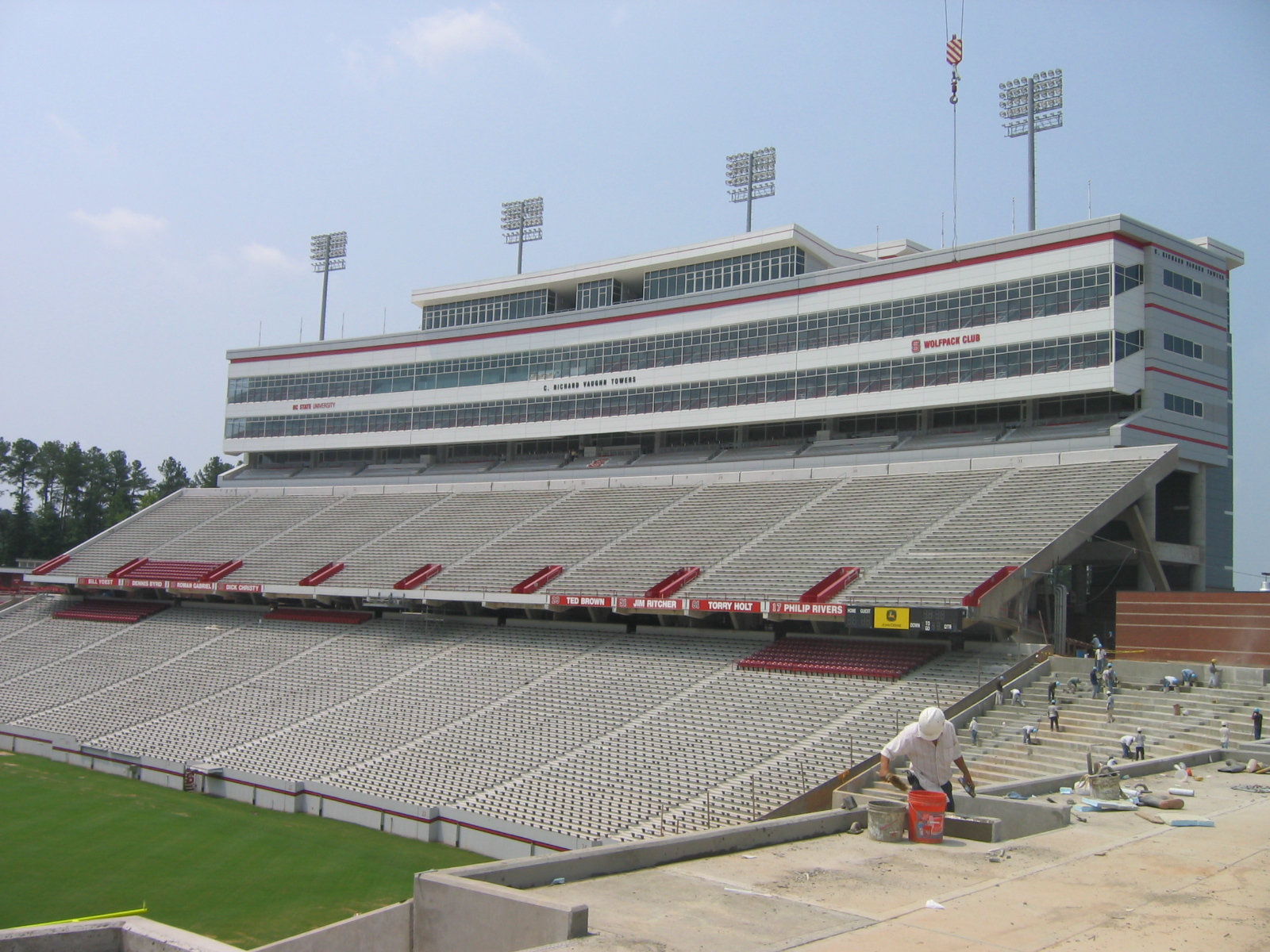
C. Richard Vaughn Towers, luxury boxes at North Carolina State's Carter–Finley Stadium

The luxury box (or skybox) and club seating constitute the most expensive class of seating in arenas and stadiums, and generate much higher revenues than regular seating. Club ticketholders often receive exclusive access to an indoor part of the venue through private club entrances, to areas containing special restaurants, bars, merchandise stands, and lounge areas of the venue that are not otherwise available to regular ticketholders.

== Location ==
These special private seating sections located within stadiums and arenas (as well as within other types of sporting and entertainment venues) are typically located in the midsection, main stand or grandstand, or both. However at some tennis venues—‌where stadiums tend to be smaller—‌the luxury boxes are often (but not always) located at the lowest ring of seats, nearest to the playing court.

Stadium luxury boxes sometimes have indoor facility glass panels which can be opened to a balcony-type area, designed to increase a patron's feeling of being immersed in the action of the event.

=== Interior and amenities ===
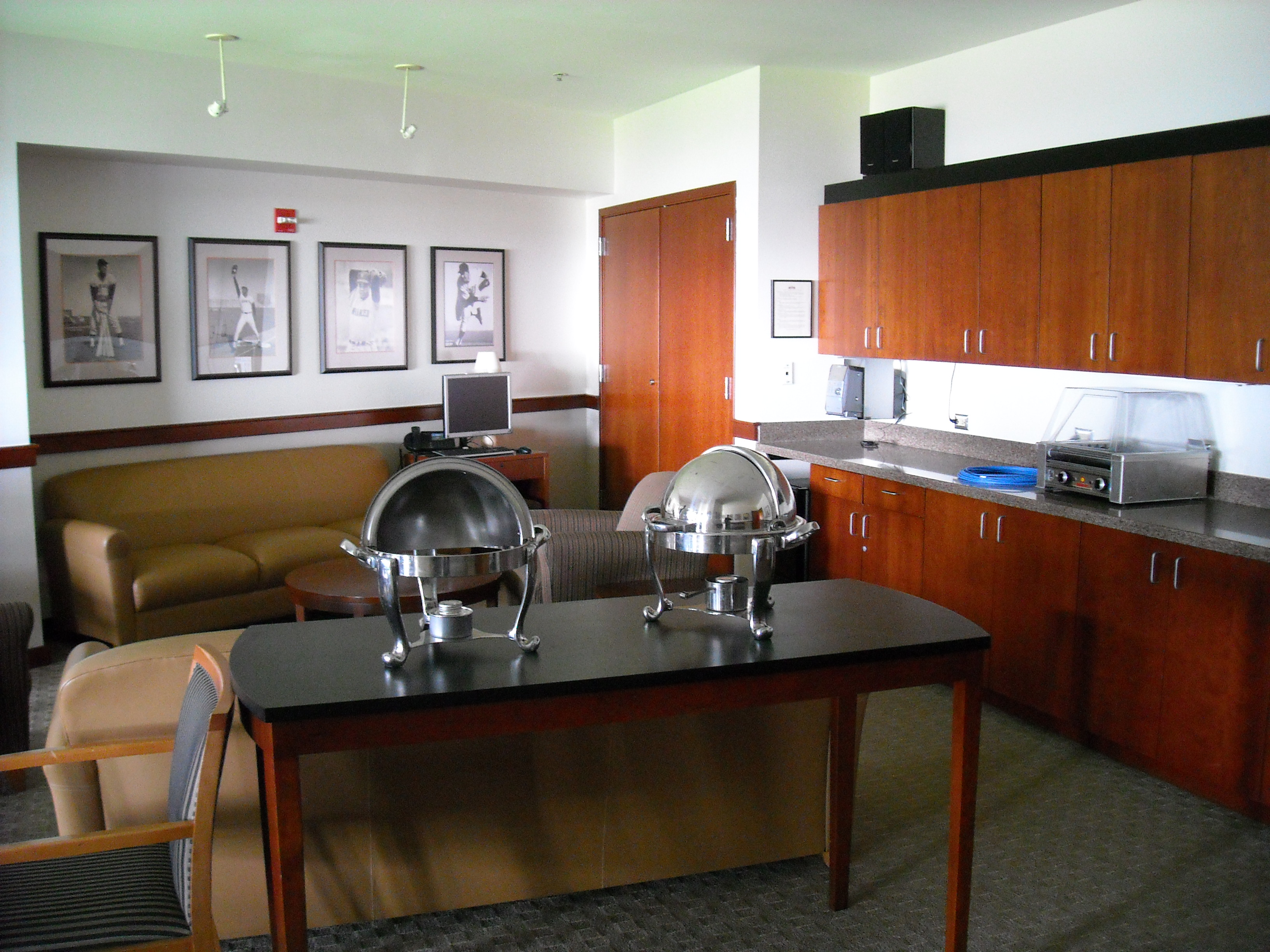
The interior of a luxury suite at AT&T Park in 2010

The inside of a luxury box typically includes a bar, televisions, a small seating area, and a private bathroom. The boxes are usually catered, with guests enjoying corporate hospitality, with champagne, canapés, shrimp, and sushi being common favorites. The lease to a box usually comes with allocated parking spaces at the venue and access is usually provided with separate entrances, away from the general public gates.

=== Commercial aspects ===
Most luxury suites are leased by contract on a yearly basis, though some are bought in a manner similar to that for a condominium. These methods usually grant access to the box by the leaseholder or owner for every event held at the venue. A few venues rent them on a per-event basis. Prices vary from US$5,000 up to the millions of dollars depending on the venue and events held there.

Luxury boxes are a significant source of revenue for most professional sports teams and venue owners. Since the late 1990s, it has been proven that luxury suites and club seating are lucrative revenue-generating features that make pro sports teams financially successful in order to remain competitive long-term. While originally widespread among North American major pro sports, this trend is also gaining popularity in Europe. For instance, Emirates Stadium's revenue from premium seating and corporate boxes alone is nearly as high as the revenue from Arsenal F.C.'s previous stadium at Highbury.

Particularly in North American major professional sports leagues, luxury suite revenue does not have to be shared—‌unlike gate receipts, which are split with visiting teams—‌leading to teams demanding new venues that contain more luxury boxes.

=== Effect on other fans' seating ===
There has been consternation that the rise of the luxury box, along with club seating, has degraded the game-day experience for the average fan, because placement of the boxes has moved the upper decks higher and farther away from the playing surface. Three current North American venues, Ford Field, Sports Illustrated Stadium, and Levi's Stadium, have addressed these concerns by placing all luxury boxes on one side of the playing surface, which allows the other sides of the venue to have closer sightlines than most modern venues. State Farm Arena in Atlanta formerly had all of its premium seating on one side of the arena; however, renovations that took place during 2017 removed the upper level luxury boxes and were replaced with a traditional upper deck and premium seating spread throughout the arena.

=== Prevalence ===
The stadium with the most luxury boxes is the Estadio Monumental "U" in Lima, Peru: with 1,251. The first stadium to contain a luxury box was the Astrodome in Houston, Texas, built in 1965. The Indianapolis Motor Speedway constructed their first luxury boxes (dubbed the "Turn Two Suites") in 1973 as part of the existing motel complex on the grounds. One unusual set of luxury boxes is located on the campus of Boston College. The school's main indoor arena, Conte Forum (also known as Kelley Rink for hockey games), is directly attached to its football venue, Alumni Stadium. Some of the luxury boxes in the combined complex overlook both the stadium's playing field and the arena floor. The University of South Dakota later borrowed Boston College's concept when it built the Sanford Coyote Sports Center, which opened in 2016 as the new home for the school's basketball and volleyball teams. Several boxes at the Sports Center allow their users to watch games at both the arena and the attached DakotaDome, home to USD football.

Luxury boxes have become a feature of the major professional sports league system in North America. The Palace of Auburn Hills' large number of luxury suites was a pioneer for the building boom of modern-style NBA arenas in the 1990s. The Detroit Pistons played in The Palace from its opening in 1988 through the 2016–17 season, by which time it was one of the NBA's oldest arenas. Nonetheless, The Palace's forward-thinking design contained the amenities that most NBA teams sought in newer arenas. The Pistons moved to the new Little Caesars Arena in midtown Detroit for the 2017–18 season, by which time only one of the five other NBA venues that opened in the 1988–89 season was still in use—the Bradley Center, which was replaced in 2018 by Fiserv Forum and then demolished in early 2019. Three others had already been demolished (Amway Arena, Charlotte Coliseum, and Miami Arena), and the last, Sleep Train Arena, was replaced in 2016.

Top-tier European pro association football teams have moved to new stadiums designed with a large number of luxury boxes, such as Benfica, Bayern Munich, Arsenal, and Juventus. Other clubs such as Real Madrid and Manchester United have extensively renovated their existing stadiums to add large numbers of luxury boxes.

=== Use in the NFL ===
Most notable in their use of luxury boxes is the National Football League. Under the NFL's current revenue sharing agreement, teams must forfeit a large portion of their ticket revenues so that the funds can be redistributed among all the teams, particularly those in smaller markets. However, the luxury boxes, quickly becoming a top source of revenue for the franchises, were exempted from this sharing requirement.

Furthermore, the NFL's blackout rule has led stadium operators to sacrifice seating capacity in favor of the luxury boxes, as it makes a sell-out easier with a lower total number of regular seats. Teams have used the threat of relocation to press state and local governments for financial assistance to either build new stadiums or renovate older venues.

== Club seating ==
Club seating, club-level seating, or premium seating is a special section of seating in modern sports stadiums and arenas. These may be known by different terms, such as "Legends Suite seats" at Yankee Stadium or "Platinum Club" at Scotiabank Arena. Club-level seating is open to the elements, as opposed to the entirely enclosed luxury boxes, which gives more of an outdoor impression at roofless and open-roof stadiums and arenas. Club-level seating is typically considered a more exclusive class of seating than elsewhere in the venue, other than the luxury boxes.

Club-level seating can either be sold as individual tickets, or marketed on a contract basis (similar to luxury suites) to allow for maximum profit on the part of the venue. This gives club seats more flexibility for individuals and small companies, while luxury boxes can typically only be leased by large corporations willing to pay around US$500,000 or higher a year. Like luxury suites, club seating generates much higher revenues than regular seating.

While luxury boxes and personal seat licenses have been around since the 1960s, club-level seating is a recent innovation of the 1990s. The mid-stage is the optimal placement for luxury boxes in order to give them good sightlines to make them attractive for lessees, however only a limited number of luxury boxes can be placed there, as adding too many mid-level boxes will reduce seating capacity and degrade the viewing experience for other parts of the venue. For the area/stadium designer, club-level seating can be implemented in the middle tier at lower cost and less space than having all luxury boxes.

=== Description ===
Club levels normally provide fans several additional amenities than standard seating. The seats themselves are often wider and more comfortable than regular seats. The club level provides fans with special access to an indoor part of the venue exclusive to fans with special tickets. These areas are air conditioned and allow access to special restaurants, merchandise stands, and lounge areas of the venue that are not otherwise available to standard ticketholders. Concession stands and vendors on the club level also often offer different menus than in other stands to give more of a special feel to the club. These areas are closed off to the rest of the venue, and they usually can only be accessed through the exclusive, private club entrances. Parking and concierge service are often available to club levels. The ratio of toilets to fans is considerably higher in the club level than general seating, avoiding the long washroom lineups that plague regular admission fans.

The club level is usually located towards the middle of the stage of seating sections, above the lower deck but below the upper deck. They are usually situated near the luxury boxes, whether right above, right below, or sandwiched between two levels of luxury boxes. Unlike some luxury box levels, most club levels do not extend very wide or wrap entirely around the venue. Some club levels stop at a certain point, giving way to an expansion of the mezzanine, while others give way to lower-class luxury boxes (such as "party suites"). A notable exception to this is Emirates Stadium in London, which has a complete tier of club seating. Some venues such as the MetLife Stadium have luxury suites that are not completely enclosed and come with exposed seats similar to those at club level.
