= Storhamar IL =

Norwegian sports club

Storhamar Idrettslag is a Norwegian multi-sports club based in Hamar. It has sections for ice hockey, team handball, association football and figure skating.

== History ==
It was founded in 1935 as Storhamar AIL, a workers' sports club which was a member of Arbeidernes Idrettsforbund. The Storhamar area was located in Vang Municipality until 1946 when it was annexed into Hamar Municipality to accommodate the growing city of Hamar. It was one of four significant clubs in the districts before 1940, and because of their status as a local club, and certain ties to the Communist Party, it declined to merge into a catch-all club after 1945. Fellow workers' sports club Hamar AIL did merge, to form part of Hamarkameratene.

== Football ==
Storhamar IL Fotball
Home colours

The men's football team currently plays in the Fourth Division, the fifth tier of Norwegian football.

== Handball ==
The club has two sections for handball, the elite section named Storhamar Håndball Elite and a grassroots section.

The team has played in the highest league since its promotion in 2016, and has won bronze three times (2007/08, 2009/10 and 2011/12). In the 2024-25 season the club won their first ever Norwegian championship, and did so undefeated.

Former players include Heidi Tjugum, Anja Hammerseng-Edin and Maja Jakobsen.

== Ice hockey ==
The ice hockey department was established in 1957, and had the name Storhamar Dragons between 1998 and 2015. It is one of the most successful ice hockey clubs in Norway. The home arenas are CC Amfi and Storhamar ishall.
