= Federation of Norwegian Process Industries =

The Federation of Norwegian Process Industries (Norwegian: Prosessindustriens Landsforening, PIL) was an employers' organisation in Norway, organized under the national Confederation of Norwegian Enterprise. On 1 January 2006 it was merged with the Federation of Norwegian Manufacturing Industries to form the Federation of Norwegian Industries.
