= Intra (Teka) =

Intra is a Norwegian industrial design and manufacturing company.

It was founded as a retailer of building articles in 1947, and was located at Buran in Trondheim. In the 1960s the company started designing and manufacturing washing sinks in stainless steel, and it took the name Intra in the 1970s. The company expanded to kitchen products as well as other bathroom products, and hired industrial designers. In the 1980s it moved to Storsand in Malvik Municipality. The owners also bought a Swedish and a Danish company, creating the Intra Group. In 2007 it was sold to the multinational Teka Group.
