= Club seating =

Amenity in sports venues

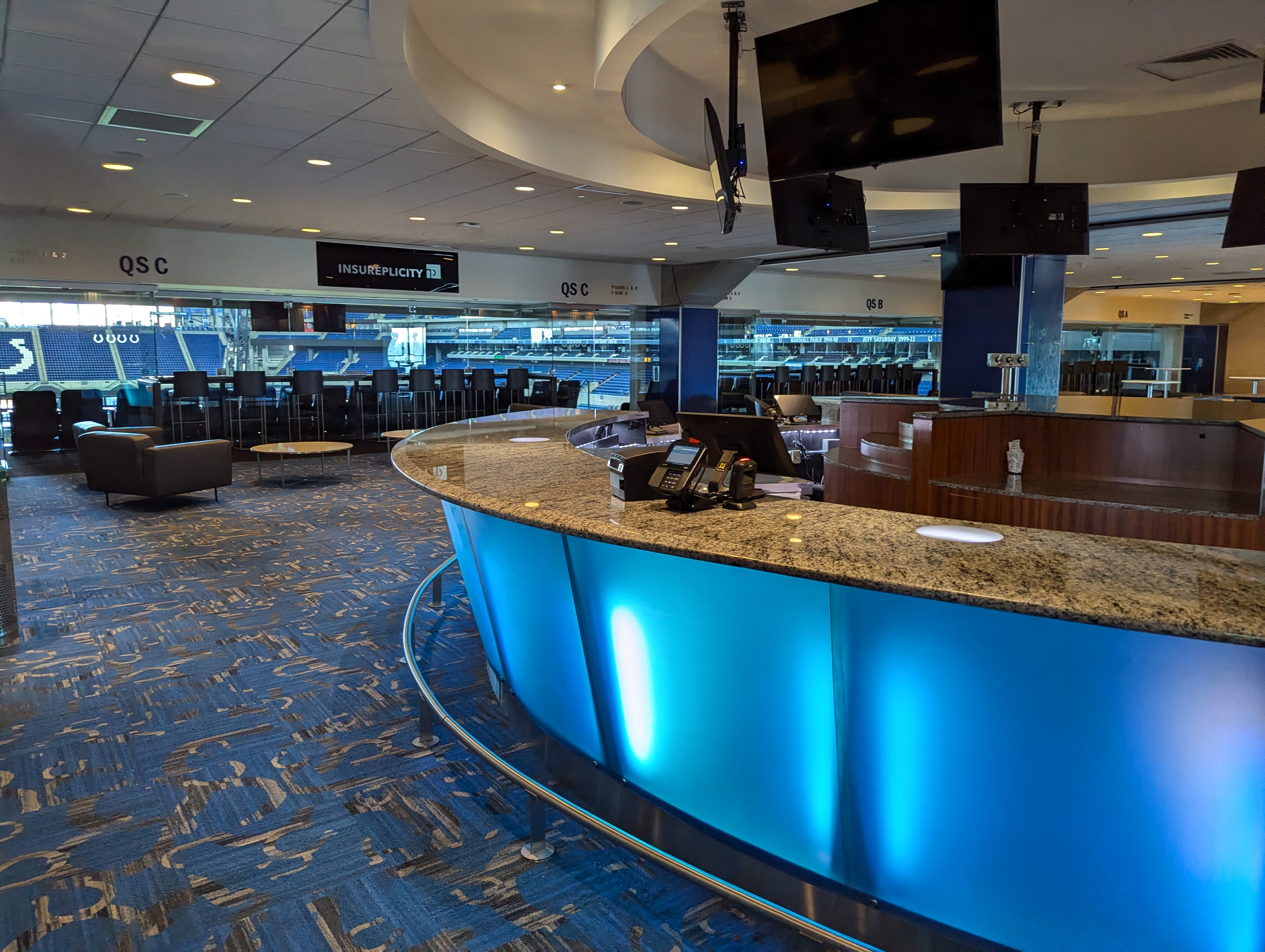
The Quarterback Suite at Lucas Oil Stadium, a 200-person club-level seating area

Club-level seating is a special section of seating in modern sports stadiums and arenas that is more exclusive than other sections. Club-level seating usually offers additional amenities, such as special restaurants, bars, and lounges, that are not accessible to other ticketholders.

== Background ==
The club level is usually located towards the middle of the stage of seating sections, above the lower deck but below the upper deck. They are usually situated near the luxury boxes, whether right above, right below, or sandwiched between two levels of luxury boxes. Club-level seating is typically considered a more exclusive class of seating than elsewhere in the venue, other than the luxury boxes.

Unlike some luxury box levels, most club levels do not wrap entirely around the venue. Some club levels stop at a certain point, giving way to an expansion of the mezzanine, while others give way to lower-class luxury boxes (such as "party suites"). A notable exception to this is Emirates Stadium in London, which has a complete tier of club seating.

Club levels normally provide fans several additional amenities than standard seating. Club-level seating is open to the elements, as opposed to the entirely enclosed luxury boxes, which gives more of an outdoor impression at roofless and open-roof stadiums and arenas. Club-level seating is normally bought on a contract basis to allow for maximum profit on the part of the venue.

The club level provides fans with special access to an indoor part of the venue exclusive to fans with special tickets. These areas are climate-controlled year-round and allow access to special restaurants, bars, merchandise stands, and lounge areas of the venue. Concession stands and vendors on the club level also often offer different menus than in other stands to give more of a special feel to the club. These areas are closed off to the rest of the venue, and they usually can only be accessed through the exclusive, private club entrances.
