= Federation of Norwegian Industries =

- Formation: November 28, 2005; 20 years ago
- Headquarters: Oslo
- Location: Norway
- Website: norskindustri.no

The Federation of Norwegian Industries (Norwegian: Norsk Industri) is an employers' organisation in Norway, organized under the national Confederation of Norwegian Enterprise.

It was established on 1 January 2006 as a merger of the Federation of Norwegian Manufacturing Industries and the Federation of Norwegian Process Industries.

The current CEO is Harald Solberg. Chairman of the board is Ståle Kyllingstad.
