= Federation of Norwegian Manufacturing Industries =

The Federation of Norwegian Manufacturing Industries (Norwegian: Teknologibedriftenes Landsforening, TBL) was an employers' organisation in Norway, organized under the national Confederation of Norwegian Enterprise. On 1 January 2006 it was merged with the Federation of Norwegian Process Industries to form the Federation of Norwegian Industries.

It was founded in 1889. The name at that time was De Mekaniske Værksteders Forening. With the Norwegian Union of Iron and Metalworkers, a trade union which is now a part of the United Federation of Trade Unions, MVF negotiated Norway's first collective bargaining agreement in 1907. The name was changed to Mekaniske Værksteders Landsforening in 1908, and to Teknologibedriftenes Landsforening on its centennial anniversary in 1989. From the same year it joined the Confederation of Norwegian Enterprise.

The idea to merge with the Federation of Norwegian Process Industries came into existence in 2003, and following negotiations the first general assembly of the new organization was held in November 2005. The merger was formally carried through on 1 January 2006.
