= 2000 Helsingborgs IF season =

Helsingborgs IF
2000 season
- Manager: (Sweden) Nanne Bergstrand
- Allsvenskan: 2nd
- Champions League: Group stage
- Top goalscorer: Álvaro Santos (12)
- Highest home attendance: 13,802
- Average home league attendance: 9,414

== Season summary ==
Helsingborg stunned the footballing world when they defeated Italian giants Inter Milan 1-0 on aggregate to become the first Swedish club to reach the Champions League group stages. Unfortunately, Helsingborg's luck ran out in the group stage and they were soundly beaten in their first three matches; they recovered to chalk up respectable draws against Paris Saint-Germain and that season's European champions, Bayern Munich, but finished bottom of their group and failed to even drop down into the UEFA Cup.

== First-team squad ==
Note: Flags indicate national team as defined under FIFA eligibility rules; some limited exceptions apply. Players may hold more than one non-FIFA nationality.

No.	Pos.	Nation	Player
1	GK	SWE	Sven Andersson
2	DF	SWE	Mats Wejsfelt
3	DF	SWE	Ola Nilsson
4	DF	SWE	Roland Nilsson
5	DF	SWE	Jozo Matovac
6	MF	NOR	Bjørn Johansen
7	MF	SWE	Ulrik Jansson (captain)
8	MF	NOR	Lars Bakkerud
9	FW	BRA	Álvaro
10	FW	SWE	Hans Eklund
11	DF	SWE	Erik Wahlstedt

No.	Pos.	Nation	Player
14	DF	SWE	Nicklas Persson
15	MF	SWE	Mattias Lindström
17	MF	SWE	Michael Hansson
18	FW	NOR	Stig Johansen
19	DF	SWE	Marcus Lindberg
20	FW	SWE	Rade Prica
21	FW	SWE	Marcus Ekenberg
22	GK	SWE	Fredrik Larsson
23	DF	SWE	Christoffer Andersson
30	DF	SWE	Jesper Jansson

== Results ==
=== Champions League ===
==== Second qualifying round ====
26 July 2000	Helsingborg (Sweden)	0–0	(Belarus) BATE Borisov	Olympia, Helsingborg
19:00 (CET)		Report; MatchCentre		Referee: Igor Ishchenko (Ukraine)

2 August 2000	BATE Borisov (Belarus)	0–3	(Sweden) Helsingborg	Dynama Stadium, Minsk
19:00 (CET)		Report; MatchCentre	Álvaro 11'; C. Andersson 24'; Wahlstedt 85'	Referee: Meir Levi (Israel)

Helsingborg won 3–0 on aggregate.

==== Third qualifying round ====
9 August 2000	Helsingborg (Sweden)	1–0	(Italy) Internazionale	Olympia, Helsingborg
20:45 (CET)	Hansson 82'	Report; MatchCentre		Referee: Zoran Arsić (Serbia and Montenegro)

23 August 2000	Internazionale (Italy)	0–0	(Sweden) Helsingborg	San Siro, Milan
21:00 (CET)		Report; MatchCentre		Referee: Vladimír Hriňák (Slovakia)

Helsingborg won 1–0 on aggregate.

==== Group stage ====
13 September 2000	Helsingborg (Sweden)	1–3	(Germany) Bayern Munich	Olympia, Helsingborg
	Johansen 90'	Report MatchCentre	Scholl 7'; Salihamidžić 48'; Jancker 55'	Referee: Graham Barber (England)

19 September 2000	Paris Saint-Germain (France)	4–1	(Sweden) Helsingborg	Parc des Princes, Paris
	Anelka 24'; Robert 63'; Christian 80'; El Karkouri 89'	Report MatchCentre	Johansen 45'	Referee: Hugh Dallas (Scotland)

26 September 2000	Rosenborg (Norway)	6–1	(Sweden) Helsingborg	Lerkendal Stadion, Trondheim
	Johnsen 20', 29', 78'; Strand 50', 51'; S. Johansen 64' (o.g.)	Report MatchCentre	Prica 90'	Referee: Jan Wegereef (Netherlands)

18 October 2000	Helsingborg (Sweden)	2–0	(Norway) Rosenborg	Olympia, Helsingborg
	Jansson 32'; Álvaro 77'	Report MatchCentre		Referee: Valentin Ivanov (Russia)

24 October 2000	Bayern Munich (Germany)	0–0	(Sweden) Helsingborg	Olympic Stadium, Munich
		Report MatchCentre		Referee: Kyros Vassaras (Greece)

8 November 2000	Helsingborg (Sweden)	1–1	(France) Paris Saint-Germain	Olympia, Helsingborg
	Persson 71'	Report MatchCentre	Anelka 34'	Referee: Graham Poll (England)
