= 2010 Rosenborg BK season =

Rosenborg
2010 season
- Manager: Erik Hamrén (until 25 May 2010); Nils Arne Eggen (from 25 May)
- Stadium: Lerkendal Stadion
- Tippeligaen: 1st
- Norwegian Football Cup: Semi-finals
- Superfinalen: Winners
- 2010–11 UEFA Champions League: Play-off round
- 2010–11 UEFA Europa League: Group stage
- Top goalscorer: League: Steffen Iversen (14)
- Average home league attendance: 16,905
- Biggest win: 4–0 v Stjørdals-Blink (Away, 13 May 2010, Norwegian Football Cup); 4–0 v Kongsvinger (Home, 6 June 2010, Tippeligaen)
- Biggest defeat: 0–4 v Bayer Leverkusen (Away, 16 September 2010, UEFA Europa League)

The 2010 season was Rosenborg's 20th consecutive year in Tippeligaen, and their 43rd season in the top-flight of Norwegian football. In addition to the domestic league, Rosenborg participated in that season's editions of the Norwegian Football Cup, the Superfinalen, the 2010–11 UEFA Champions League and the 2010–11 UEFA Europa League.

== Squad ==
Squad at end of season

Note: Flags indicate national team as defined under FIFA eligibility rules; some limited exceptions apply. Players may hold more than one non-FIFA nationality.

No.	Pos.	Nation	Player
1	GK	SWE	Daniel Örlund
2	DF	SWE	Mikael Lustig
3	DF	SWE	Mikael Dorsin
4	MF	GHA	Anthony Annan
5	MF	SWE	Mattias Bjärsmyr
6	MF	NOR	Roar Strand
7	FW	NOR	Trond Olsen
8	MF	NOR	Fredrik Winsnes
9	FW	NOR	Michael Jamtfall
10	MF	NOR	Morten Moldskred
11	DF	NOR	Vadim Demidov

No.	Pos.	Nation	Player
14	FW	NOR	Steffen Iversen
15	MF	NOR	Per Ciljan Skjelbred
16	DF	NOR	Simen Wangberg
18	DF	URU	Alejandro Lago
19	MF	NOR	Markus Henriksen
21	FW	NOR	Mushaga Bakenga
23	MF	NOR	Gjermund Åsen
26	GK	NOR	Erik Mellevold Bråthen
27	MF	CIV	Bakary Saré
30	FW	SWE	Rade Prica

== Competitions ==
=== Overview ===
Competition	First match	Last match	Starting round	Final position	Record							
Competition	First match	Last match	Starting round	Final position	Pld	W	D	L	GF	GA	GD	Win %
Tippeligaen	14 March 2010	7 November 2010	Matchday 1	Winners	30	19	11	0	58	24	+34	63.33
Norwegian Football Cup	13 May 2010	22 September 2010	First round	Semi-finals	6	5	0	1	21	9	+12	83.33
Superfinalen	7 March 2010		Final	Winners	1	1	0	0	3	1	+2	100.00
2010–11 UEFA Champions League	14 July 2010	25 August 2010	Second qualifying round	Play-off round	6	4	1	1	8	2	+6	66.67
2010–11 UEFA Europa League	16 September 2010	16 December 2010	Group stage	Group stage	6	1	0	5	3	13	−10	16.67
Total					49	30	12	7	93	49	+44	61.22

Source: Competitions

=== Superfinalen ===
Rosenborg, as Tippeligaen winners in the previous season, played against Aalesund in the 2010 Superfinalen, who themselves won the Norwegian Football Cup.

7 March 2010 Final	Aalesund	1–3	Rosenborg	Ålesund
19:00 CEST (UTC+2)	Larsen (yellow card) 32', (goal) 59'; Arnefjord (yellow card) 45'	Report	Stadsgaard 7', (yellow card) 41'; Prica 26'; Olsen 49'; Annan (yellow card) 89'	Stadium: Color Line Stadion

=== Tippeligaen ===
==== League table ====
Pos	Team	Pld	W	D	L	GF	GA	GD	Pts	Qualification or relegation
1	Rosenborg (C)	30	19	11	0	58	24	+34	68	Qualification for the Champions League second qualifying round
2	Vålerenga	30	19	4	7	69	36	+33	61	Qualification for the Europa League second qualifying round
3	Tromsø	30	14	8	8	36	30	+6	50	Qualification for the Europa League first qualifying round (Note: Norway was among the best three associations in the UEFA Fair Play ranking and thus received an additional spot in the first qualifying round of the Europa League.)
4	Aalesund	30	14	5	11	46	37	+9	47	Qualification for the Europa League first qualifying round
5	Odd Grenland	30	12	10	8	48	41	+7	46	

Source: fotball.no
Rules for classification: 1) points; 2) goal difference; 3) number of goals scored.
(C) Champions

==== Results summary ====
Overall								Home						Away					
Pld	W	D	L	GF	GA	GD	Pts	W	D	L	GF	GA	GD	W	D	L	GF	GA	GD
30	19	11	0	58	24	+34	68	10	5	0	34	12	+22	9	6	0	24	12	+12

Source: fotball.no

==== Results by round ====
Round	1	2	3	4	5	6	7	8	9	10	11	12	13	14	15	16	17	18	19	20	21	22	23	24	25	26	27	28	29	30
Ground	A	H	A	H	A	H	A	H	A	H	A	H	A	H	H	A	H	A	H	A	H	A	H	A	A	H	A	H	A	H
Result	W	D	D	W	W	W	D	D	D	W	D	W	W	W	W	W	D	W	W	W	W	W	D	W	D	W	W	W	D	D
Position	7	5	9	4	3	1	2	3	3	2	2	2	2	1	1	1	1	1	1	1	1	1	1	1	1	1	1	1	1	1
Points	3	4	5	8	11	14	15	16	17	20	21	24	27	30	33	36	37	40	43	46	49	52	53	56	57	60	63	66	67	68

Source: Matches
A = Away; H = Home; W = Win; D = Draw; L = Loss

==== Matches ====
14 March 2010 1	Molde	1–2	Rosenborg	Molde
20:00 CET (UTC+1)	Diouf (yellow card) 5'; Runström 27'; Hestad (yellow card) 33'	Report	Åsen (yellow card) 23'; Prica 42'; Lustig 51'	Stadium: Aker Stadion; Attendance: 9,080; Referee: Terje Hauge

22 March 2010 2	Rosenborg	3–3	Start	Trondheim
19:00 CET (UTC+1)	Iversen 21' (pen.); Olsen 48', 60'; Dorsin (yellow card) 90+3'	Report	Kleiven 32'; Børufsen 37'; Årst 50'; Vikstøl (yellow card) 74'; Goodson (yellow card) 90+4'	Stadium: Lerkendal Stadion; Attendance: 14,122; Referee: Svein Oddvar Moen; Assistant referees: Kim Tomas Haglund, Magnus Lundberg; Fourth official: Day Vidar Hafsås

28 March 2010 3	Vålerenga	0–0	Rosenborg	Oslo
20:00 CEST (UTC+2)	Dos Santos (yellow card) 20'; Fellah (yellow card) 46'; Hæstad (yellow card) 62'; Shelton (yellow card) 74'	Report	Annan (yellow card) 46'	Stadium: Ullevaal Stadion; Attendance: 17,284; Referee: Tommy Skjerven; Assistant referees: Frank Andås, Sven Erik Midthjell

5 April 2010 4	Rosenborg	3–0	Strømsgodset	Trondheim
18:00 CEST (UTC+2)	Olsen 45'; Iversen 76', 90+1'	Report		Stadium: Lerkendal Stadion; Attendance: 17,151; Referee: Terje Hauge; Assistant referees: Geir Åge Holen, Kim Tomas Haglund

11 April 2010 5	Odd Grenland	1–3	Rosenborg	Skien
20:00 CEST (UTC+2)	Kovács 9', (yellow card) 45+1'; Fevang (yellow card) 22'; Rambekk (yellow card) 43'	Report	Henriksen 18', 81'; Stadsgaard (yellow card) 35'; Prica 55'	Stadium: Skagerak Arena; Attendance: 9,200; Referee: Tom Henning Øvrebø; Assistant referees: Geir Åge Holen, Magnus Lundberg

14 April 2010 6	Rosenborg	3–0	Brann	Trondheim
20:00 CEST (UTC+2)	Iversen 57'; Sellin 74', 85'	Report	Huseklepp (yellow card) 84'; Birkir (yellow card) 90+1'	Stadium: Lerkendal Stadion; Attendance: 18,727; Referee: Brage Sandmoen; Assistant referees: Erik Ræstad, Øystein Havig; Fourth official: Kjetil Thorsø Hansen

19 April 2010 7	Aalesund	1–1	Rosenborg	Ålesund
19:00 CEST (UTC+2)	Carlsen 8'	Report	Prica 49'	Stadium: Color Line Stadion; Attendance: 10,634; Referee: Kjetil Sælen; Assistant referees: Roe Vidar Lien, Erik Ræstad

25 April 2010 8	Rosenborg	0–0	Lillestrøm	Trondheim
20:00 CEST (UTC+2)	Demidov (yellow card) 20'; Stadsgaard (yellow card) 56'	Report	Sigurðarson (yellow card) 19'; Eriksen (yellow card) 20'; Igebor (yellow card) 74'	Stadium: Lerkendal Stadion; Attendance: 17,104; Referee: Tom Henning Øvrebø; Assistant referees: Dag Roger Nebben, Sven Erik Midthjell; Fourth official: Dag Vidar Hafsås

2 May 2010 9	Tromsø	0–0	Rosenborg	Tromsø
20:00 CEST (UTC+2)	Rushfeldt (yellow card) 55'; Mourad (yellow card) 81'; Mbodji (yellow card) 90+3'	Report	Stadsgaard (yellow card) 28'	Stadium: Alfheim Stadion; Attendance: 7,024; Referee: Brage Sandmoen; Assistant referees: Erik Ræstad, Sven Erik Midthjell; Fourth official: Per Ivar Staberg

5 May 2010 10	Rosenborg	2–0	Stabæk	Trondheim
19:00 CEST (UTC+2)	Prica 11', 47'	Report		Stadium: Lerkendal Stadion; Attendance: 14,794; Referee: Terje Hauge; Assistant referees: Magne Tøsse, Harald Strand

9 May 2010 11	Haugesund	0–0	Rosenborg	Haugesund
18:00 CEST (UTC+2)	Đurđić (yellow card) 26'; Mæland (yellow card) 40'	Report	Prica (yellow card) 29'; Henriksen (yellow card) 56'	Stadium: Haugesund Stadion; Attendance: 5,000; Referee: Tom Harald Hagen; Assistant referees: Sven Erik Midthjell, Kim Tomas Haglund; Fourth official: Svein Oddvar Moen

16 May 2010 12	Rosenborg	3–0	Hønefoss	Trondheim
18:00 CEST (UTC+2)	Dorsin 29'; Lustig 40'; Iversen 50'	Report	Obiefule (yellow card) 73'	Stadium: Lerkendal Stadion; Attendance: 21,474; Referee: Svein-Erik Edvartsen; Assistant referees: Erik Ræstad, Roe Vidar Lien

24 May 2010 13	Viking	1–2	Rosenborg	Stavanger
20:00 CEST (UTC+2)	Ingelsten 22'; Sokolowski (yellow card) 50'; Jarstein (yellow card) 90+4'	Report	Demidov (yellow card) 13' (yellow-red card) 30'; Lustig 39'; Annan (yellow card) 62'; Iversen 90+4' (pen.)	Stadium: Viking Stadion; Attendance: 12,451; Referee: Roy Helge Olsen; Assistant referees: Odd-Jarle Larsen, Hans Christian Stormoen

6 June 2010 14	Rosenborg	4–0	Kongsvinger	Trondheim
18:00 CEST (UTC+2)	Winsnes 4'; Iversen 8' (pen.); Skjelbred 11'; Prica 47'	Report		Stadium: Lerkendal Stadion; Attendance: 19,903; Referee: Tommy Skjerven; Assistant referees: Øystein Havig, Reidar Gundersen

3 July 2010 15	Rosenborg	1–0	Sandefjord	Trondheim
18:00 CEST (UTC+2)	Strand 86'	Report	Sohna (yellow card) 49'	Stadium: Lerkendal Stadion; Attendance: 13,903; Referee: Tom Henning Øvrebø; Assistant referees: Roe Vidar Lien, Magnus Lundberg; Fourth official: Kjetil Thorsø Hansen

10 July 2010 16	Lillestrøm	1–2	Rosenborg	Lillestrøm
18:00 CEST (UTC+2)	Ujah 33'	Report	Lustig 29'; Stadsgaard (yellow card) 61'; Olsen (yellow card) 70'; Dorsin 90+3'	Stadium: Åråsen Stadion; Attendance: 7,395; Referee: Tommy Skjerven; Assistant referees: Erik Ræstad, Roe Vidar Lien

18 July 2010 17	Rosenborg	1–1	Odd Grenland	Trondheim
20:00 CEST (UTC+2)	Iversen 14' (pen.)	Report	Samuelsen (yellow card) 65'; Stadsgaard 76' (o.g.); Hagen (yellow card) 87'	Stadium: Lerkendal Stadion; Attendance: 14,390; Referee: Svein Oddvar Moen; Assistant referees: Kim Tomas Haglund, Sven Erik Midthjell; Fourth official: Dag Vidar Hafsås

25 July 2010 18	Stabæk	1–2	Rosenborg	Bærum
20:00 CEST (UTC+2)	Veigar (yellow card) 85'; Stenvoll 90+1'	Report	Olsen 65'; Moldskred 89'	Stadium: Telenor Arena; Attendance: 9,470; Referee: Terje Hauge; Assistant referees: Kim Tomas Haglund, Frank Andås; Fourth official: Svein-Erik Edvartsen

1 August 2010 19	Rosenborg	4–3	Haugesund	Trondheim
18:00 CEST (UTC+2)	Iversen 11', 50', 75', (penalty missed) 87'; Skjerve 22' (o.g.)	Report	Đurđić 16'; Tronseth 20'; Våge Nilsen 32', (yellow card) 90+2'	Stadium: Lerkendal Stadion; Attendance: 14,652; Referee: Kjetil Sælen; Assistant referees: Kim André Johnsen, Hans Christian Stormoen

7 August 2010 20	Sandefjord	1–3	Rosenborg	Sandefjord
17:00 CEST (UTC+2)	Røyrane 9'	Report	Prica 41' (pen.); Henriksen 48'; Moldskred 87'	Stadium: Komplett.no Arena; Attendance: 4,976; Referee: Brage Sandmoen; Assistant referees: Harald Strand, Kai Lafjell; Fourth official: Ken Henry Johnsen

22 August 2010 21	Rosenborg	3–1	Molde	Trondheim
20:00 CEST (UTC+2)	Strand 14'; Dorsin 32'; Iversen 61'	Report	Hoseth 11', (yellow card) 38'; Berg Hestad (red card) 78'	Stadium: Lerkendal Stadion; Attendance: 16,762; Referee: Svein Oddvar Moen; Assistant referees: Dag Roger Nebben, Øystein Havig; Fourth official: Dag Vidar Hafsås

29 August 2010 22	Start	2–3	Rosenborg	Kristiansand
20:00 CEST (UTC+2)	Bolaños 22'; Hoff 51'	Report	Prica 32', 74'; Henriksen 65'	Stadium: Sør Arena; Attendance: 10,200; Referee: Tommy Skjerven; Assistant referees: Frank Andås, Roe Vidar Lien

12 September 2010 23	Rosenborg	1–1	Viking	Trondheim
18:00 CEST (UTC+2)	Jamtfall 58'	Report	Bjarnason (yellow card) 61', (goal) 71'	Stadium: Lerkendal Stadion; Attendance: 15,525; Referee: Tom Henning Øvrebø; Assistant referees: Erik Ræstad, Odd Arne Vangen; Fourth official: Dag Vidar Hafsås

19 September 2010 24	Brann	2–3	Rosenborg	Bergen
20:00 CEST (UTC+2)	Vaagan Moen (yellow card) 21', (goal) 80'; Birkir 40'	Report	Henriksen 11', 88'; Lustig (yellow card) 27'; Iversen 63' (pen.)	Stadium: Brann Stadion; Attendance: 14,901; Referee: Svein Oddvar Moen; Assistant referees: Geir Åge Holen, Frank Andås

26 September 2010 25	Strømsgodset	1–1	Rosenborg	Drammen
18:00 CEST (UTC+2)	Riddez (yellow card) 24'; Kamara 76'; Morrison (yellow card) 85'	Report	Strand 31'	Stadium: Marienlyst Stadion; Attendance: 7,290; Referee: Tom Henning Øvrebø; Assistant referees: Magnus Lundberg, Kai Lafjell

3 October 2010 26	Rosenborg	3–1	Vålerenga	Trondheim
20:00 CEST (UTC+2)	Annan (yellow card) 26'; Iversen 27' (pen.); Moldskred; Henriksen 87'	Report	Zajić 18'; Dos Santos (yellow card) 26' (yellow-red card) 37'	Stadium: Lerkendal Stadion; Attendance: 21,028; Referee: Terje Hauge; Assistant referees: Kim Tomas Haglund, Frank Andås; Fourth official: Dag Vidar Hafsås

17 October 2010 27	Hønefoss	0–2	Rosenborg	Hønefoss
20:00 CEST (UTC+2)	Hovda (yellow card) 71'; Olsen (yellow card) 90'	Report	Prica 42', 47'; Winsnes (yellow card) 71'	Stadium: Aka Arena; Attendance: 4,233; Referee: Svein-Erik Edvartsen; Assistant referees: Frank Andås, Sven Erik Midthjell

24 October 2010 28	Rosenborg	1–0	Tromsø	Trondheim
20:00 CEST (UTC+2)	Bjärsmyr (yellow card) 53'; Prica 79'	Report		Stadium: Lerkendal Stadion; Attendance: 15,613; Referee: Espen Berntsen; Assistant referees: Odd-Jarle Larsen, Dag Roger Nebben

31 October 2010 29	Kongsvinger	0–0	Rosenborg	Kongsvinger
18:00 CET (UTC+1)		Report	Lustig (yellow card) 74'	Stadium: Gjemselund Stadion; Attendance: 3,506; Referee: Terje Hauge; Assistant referees: Harald Strand, Chriss Bjorøy; Fourth official: Kristoffer Leirdal

7 November 2010 30	Rosenborg	2–2	Aalesund	Trondheim
18:00 CET (UTC+1)	Dorsin 37'; Bjärsmyr (yellow card) 53'; Prica 55'	Report	Barrantes 22'; Parr (yellow card) 27'; Aarøy (yellow card) 46'; Sylling Olsen 89'	Stadium: Lerkendal Stadion; Attendance: 18,429; Referee: Tom Henning Øvrebø; Assistant referees: Roe Vidar Lien, Erik Ræstad; Fourth official: Dag Vidar Hafsås

=== Norwegian Football Cup ===
13 May 2010 First round	Stjørdals-Blink	0–4	Rosenborg	Stjørdalshalsen
18:00 CEST (UTC+2)	Stokke (yellow card) 39'	Report	Moldskred 7'; Olsen 14', 90'; Traoré 75' (pen.)	Stadium: Øverlands Minde

19 May 2010 Second round	Steinkjer	1–4	Rosenborg	Steinkjer
18:00 CEST (UTC+2)	Rishaug 78'	Report	Olsen 47'; Henriksen 58', 84'; Iversen 90'	Stadium: Guldbergaunet Stadion

30 June 2010 Third round	Rosenborg	3–1	Alta	Trondheim
18:00 CEST (UTC+2)	Dorsin 47'; Lustig 63'; Skjelbred 84'	Report	Softic 76'	Stadium: Lerkendal Stadion

7 July 2010 Fourth round	Sandefjord	1–4	Rosenborg	Sandefjord
18:00 CEST (UTC+2)	Lustig 59' (o.g.)	Report	Skjelbred 3'; Moldskred 45', 68'; Dorsin 73'	Stadium: Komplett.no Arena; Attendance: 2,364; Referee: Espen Berntsen

14 August 2010 Quarter-finals	Rosenborg	4–3	Start	Trondheim
19:45 CEST (UTC+2)	Iversen 27' (pen.); Lustig 46'; Annan 49', (yellow card) 48' (yellow-red card) 54'; Olsen 51'; Stadsgaard (yellow card) 90'	Report	Hoff 5'; Årst 9', 53', (yellow card) 90'; Høie (yellow card) 52'	Stadium: Lerkendal Stadion; Attendance: 5,987

22 September 2010 Semi-finals	Follo	3–2 (a.e.t.)	Rosenborg	Ski
16:00 CEST (UTC+2)	Hagen 39'; Markegård 74'; Grini (yellow card) 106'; Clausen 114'	Report	Henriksen 4'; Iversen 62'; Bjärsmyr (yellow card) 71'	Stadium: Ski Stadion

=== UEFA Champions League ===
==== Qualifying rounds ====
===== Second qualifying round =====
14 July 2010 First leg	Linfield (Northern Ireland)	0–0	(Norway) Rosenborg	Belfast, Northern Ireland
19:45 IST (UTC+1)	Garrett (yellow card) 67'	Report	Annan (yellow card) 65'; Dorsin (yellow card) 87'	Stadium: Windsor Park; Attendance: 1,800; Referee: Saïd Ennjimi (France); Assistant referees: Frédéric Cano (France), Djemel Zitouni (France); Fourth official: Olivier Thual (France)

21 July 2010 Second leg	Rosenborg (Norway)	2–0 (2–0 agg.)	(Northern Ireland) Linfield	Trondheim, Norway
20:45 CEST (UTC+2)	Prica 32'; Henriksen 87'	Report	Curran (yellow card) 37'; Garrett (yellow card) 54'	Stadium: Lerkendal Stadion; Attendance: 6,645; Referee: Robert Schörgenhofer (Austria); Assistant referees: Roland Heim (Austria), Matthias Winsauer (Austria); Fourth official: Thomas Gangl (Austria)
Note: Rosenborg won 2–0 on aggregate.

===== Third qualifying round =====
28 July 2010 First leg	AIK (Sweden)	0–1	(Norway) Rosenborg	Solna, Swedem
20:45 CEST (UTC+2)	Persson (yellow card) 17'; Turina (yellow card) 65'; Bangura (yellow card) 77'	Report	Henriksen 33'	Stadium: Råsunda Stadium; Attendance: 16,768; Referee: Thorsten Kinhöfer (Germany); Assistant referees: Detlef Scheppe (Germany), Florian Steuer (Germany); Fourth official: Peter Gagelmann (Germany)

4 August 2010 Second leg	Rosenborg (Norway)	3–0 (4–0 agg.)	(Sweden) AIK	Trondheim, Norway
20:00 CEST (UTC+2)	Prica 55'; Demidov 64'; Lustig 76'	Report	Johansson (yellow card) 43'	Stadium: Lerkendal Stadion; Attendance: 14,709; Referee: Eduardo Iturralde González (Spain); Assistant referees: Roberto del Palomar (Spain), Jon Núñez (Spain); Fourth official: Javier Turienzo Alvarez (Spain)
Note: Rosenborg won 4–0 on aggregate.

==== Play-off round ====
17 August 2010 First leg	Rosenborg (Norway)	2–1	(Denmark) Copenhagen	Trondheim, Norway
20:45 CEST (UTC+2)	Iversen 23'; Olsen (yellow card) 48'; Henriksen 57'; Annan (yellow card) 72'	Report	Vingaard (yellow card) 6'; Kvist (yellow card) 43'; Grønkjær 84'	Stadium: Lerkendal Stadion; Attendance: 18,822; Referee: Gianluca Rocchi (Italy); Assistant referees: Luca Maggiani (Italy), Nicola Nicoletti (Italy); Fourth official: Domenico Celi (Italy); Goal-line assistants: Daniele Orsato (Italy), Andrea De Marco (Italy)

25 August 2010 Second leg	Copenhagen (Denmark)	1–0 ((a) 2–2 agg.)	(Norway) Rosenborg	Copenhagen, Denmark
20:45 CEST (UTC+2)	Ottesen 33'	Report	Stadsgaard (yellow card) 45+1'; Henriksen (yellow card) 83'	Stadium: Parken Stadium; Attendance: 31,180; Referee: Felix Brych (Germany); Assistant referees: Thorsten Schiffner (Germany), Mark Borsch (Germany); Fourth official: Deniz Aytekin (Germany); Goal-line assistants: Tobias Welz (Germany), Markus Wingenbach (Germany)
Note: 2–2 on aggregate. Copenhagen won on away goals.

=== UEFA Europa League ===
==== Group stage ====
Pos	Team	Pld	W	D	L	GF	GA	GD	Pts	Qualification	LEV	ARI	ATL	RBK
1	(Germany) Bayer Leverkusen	6	3	3	0	8	2	+6	12	Advance to knockout phase	—	1–0	1–1	4–0
2	(Greece) Aris	6	3	1	2	7	5	+2	10	Advance to knockout phase	0–0	—	1–0	2–0
3	(Spain) Atlético Madrid	6	2	2	2	9	7	+2	8		1–1	2–3	—	3–0
4	(Norway) Rosenborg	6	1	0	5	3	13	−10	3		0–1	2–1	1–2	—

Source: Soccerway

16 September 2010 1	Bayer Leverkusen (Germany)	4–0	(Norway) Rosenborg	Leverkusen, Germany
19:00 CEST (UTC+2)	Helmes 4', 58', 61'; Reinartz 38'	Report	Prica (yellow card) 76'	Stadium: BayArena; Attendance: 13,065; Referee: Nicolai Vollquartz (Denmark); Assistant referees: Torben Jensen (Denmark), Lars Hummelgaard (Denmark); Fourth official: Jakob Kehlet (Denmark); Goal-line assistants: Emil Laursen (Denmark), Henrik Nystrup Kragh (Denmark)

30 September 2010 2	Rosenborg (Norway)	2–1	(Greece) Aris	Trondheim, Norway
21:05 CEST (UTC+2)	Moldskred 37'; Prica (yellow card) 61', (goal) 68'; Dorsin (yellow card) 72'	Report	Vangjeli (yellow card) 21'; Ruiz 43'; Ronaldo (yellow card) 61'	Stadium: Lerkendal Stadion; Attendance: 11,016; Referee: Eric Braamhaar (Netherlands); Assistant referees: Wilco Lobbert (Netherlands), Erwin Zeinstra (Netherlands); Fourth official: Serdar Gözübüyük (Netherlands); Goal-line assistants: Pol van Boekel (Netherlands), Peter Janssen (Netherlands)

21 October 2010 3	Atlético Madrid (Spain)	3–0	(Norway) Rosenborg	Madrid, Spain
21:05 CEST (UTC+2)	Godín 17'; Agüero 66'; Costa 78'	Report	Skjelbred (yellow card) 42'	Stadium: Vicente Calderón Stadium; Attendance: 28,472; Referee: Cyril Zimmermann (Switzerland); Assistant referees: Beat Hidber (Switzerland), Bruno Zurbrügg (Switzerland); Fourth official: Daniel Wermelinger (Switzerland); Goal-line assistants: Alain Bieri (Switzerland), Nikolaj Hänni (Switzerland)

4 November 2010 4	Rosenborg (Norway)	1–2	(Spain) Atlético Madrid	Trondheim, Norway
19:00 CET (UTC+1)	Moldskred (yellow card) 28'; Henriksen 52'	Report	Agüero (yellow card) 4', (yellow card) 53'; De Gea (yellow card) 78'; Tiago (yellow card) 84'	Stadium: Lerkendal Stadion; Attendance: 14,248; Referee: Vladislav Bezborodov (Russia); Assistant referees: Vyacheslav Semenov (Russia), Ilya Baryshnikov (Russia); Fourth official: Aleksei Eskov (Russia); Goal-line assistants: Aleksandr Gvardis (Russia), Vladimir Kazmenko (Russia)

1 December 2010 5	Rosenborg (Norway)	0–1	(Germany) Bayer Leverkusen	Trondheim, Norway
21:05 CET (UTC+1)	Annan (yellow card) 22'	Report	Sam 35'	Stadium: Lerkendal Stadion; Attendance: 11,096; Referee: Alan Kelly (Republic of Ireland); Assistant referees: Damien MacGraith (Republic of Ireland), Marc Douglas (Republic of Ireland); Fourth official: Padraig Sutton (Republic of Ireland); Goal-line assistants: Anthony Buttimer (Republic of Ireland), Neil Doyle (Republic of Ireland)

16 December 2010 6	Aris (Greece)	2–0	(Norway) Rosenborg	Thessaloniki, Greece
20:00 EET (UTC+2)	Cesarec 45+1'; Faty 90+2'	Report	Prica (yellow card) 77'	Stadium: Kleanthis Vikelidis Stadium; Attendance: 17,283; Referee: Thomas Einwaller (Austria); Assistant referees: Roland Heim (Austria), Klaus Strasser (Austria); Fourth official: Manuel Schuettengruber (Austria); Goal-line assistants: Rene Eisner (Austria), Harald Lechner (Austria)
