= 2010 Superfinalen =

Aalesund	Rosenborg
1	3
- Date: 7 March 2010
- Venue: Color Line Stadion, Ålesund
- Referee: Tommy Skjerven (Kaupanger)
- Attendance: 3,180

The 2010 Superfinalen was the second edition of Superfinalen, an annual football match between the winners of the previous season's Tippeligaen and Norwegian Cup competitions. Modeled on the FA Community Shield, the match is intended to be a season opener, with the net proceeds going to charity. It took take place on 7 March 2010, at Color Line Stadion, Ålesund, and was contested by Rosenborg and Aalesund, winners of the 2009 Tippeligaen and 2009 Norwegian Football Cup respectively. Rosenborg won the match 3–1 after leading 2–0 at halftime. Kris Stadsgaard and Rade Prica scored the goals in the first half, and Trond Olsen increased Rosenborg's lead to 3–0 before Aalesund pulled one back, courtesy of Peter Orry Larsen.

== Match details ==
7 March 2010
19:00 CET

Aalesund	1–3	Rosenborg
Larsen 59'	Report	Stadsgaard 7'; Prica 26'; Olsen 49'

Color Line Stadion, Ålesund
Attendance: 3,180
Referee: Tommy Skjerven (Kaupanger)

Aalesund	Rosenborg

AALESUND:
GK	13	(Denmark) Anders Lindegaard
RB	5	(Finland) Ville Jalasto
CB	15	(Sweden) Daniel Arnefjord	(yellow card) 45'
CB	4	(Norway) Jonatan Tollås
LB	14	(Norway) Jonathan Parr		(substituted off) 58'
DM	10	(Sweden) Johan Arneng (c)
DM	22	(Norway) Fredrik Carlsen		(substituted off) 58'
AM	19	(Norway) Peter Orry Larsen	(yellow card) 32'
RW	17	(Jamaica) Demar Phillips
LW	25	(Brazil) Diego Silva		(substituted off) 58'
CF	8	(Norway) Tor Hogne Aarøy
Substitutes:
GK	1	(Norway) Sten Grytebust
DF	11	(Norway) Pablo Herrera		(substituted on) 58'
DF	16	(Estonia) Enar Jääger
MF	2	(Norway) Amund Skiri
MF	6	(Norway) Magnus Sylling Olsen		(substituted on) 58'
FW	9	(Norway) Glenn Roberts
FW	18	(Jamaica) Khari Stephenson		(substituted on) 58'
Manager:
(Norway) Kjetil Rekdal

ROSENBORG:
GK	1	(Sweden) Daniel Örlund
RB	2	(Sweden) Mikael Lustig
CB	13	(Denmark) Kris Stadsgaard	(yellow card) 41'
CB	11	(Norway) Vadim Demidov
LB	3	(Sweden) Mikael Dorsin
DM	4	(Ghana) Anthony Annan	(yellow card) 89'
DM	8	(Norway) Fredrik Winsnes		(substituted off) 83'
RM	6	(Norway) Roar Strand (c)
AM	14	(Norway) Steffen Iversen		(substituted off) 36'
LM	10	(Norway) Morten Moldskred		(substituted off) 73'
CF	30	(Sweden) Rade Prica
Substitutes:
GK	12	(Norway) Rune Jarstein
DF	16	(Norway) Simen Wangberg
MF	7	(Norway) Trond Olsen		(substituted on) 36'
MF	20	(Ivory Coast) Abdou Razack Traoré
MF	23	(Norway) Gjermund Åsen		(substituted on) 83'
MF	28	(Norway) Markus Henriksen		(substituted on) 73'
FW	17	(Norway) Kjell Rune Sellin
Manager:
(Sweden) Erik Hamrén

MATCH OFFICIALS

- Assistant referees:
  - Frank Andås (Gjøvik-Lyn)
  - Hans Christian Stormoen (Årstad IL)
- Fourth official: Sigurd Kringstad (Giske IL)

MATCH RULES

- 90 minutes.
- Penalty shoot-out if scores level after 90 minutes.
- Seven named substitutes
- Maximum of three substitutions.

== See also ==
- 2009 Tippeligaen
- 2009 Norwegian Football Cup
