= Jørn Jamtfall =

Norwegian footballer and coach (born 1966)

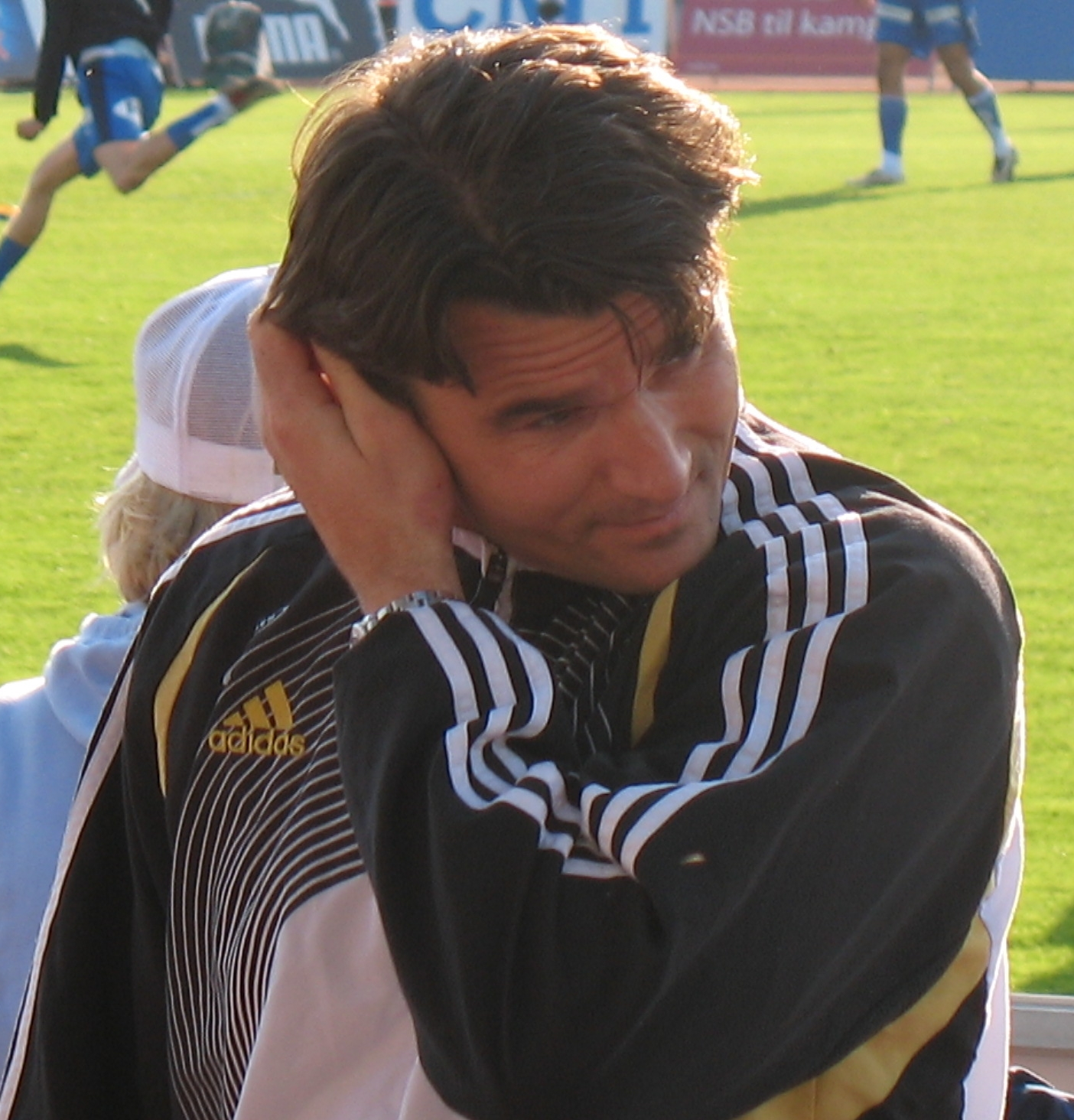
Jørn Jamtfall

Jørn Jamtfall (born 24 July 1966) is a Norwegian football coach and a former goalkeeper. He spent most of his professional career, from 1994 to 2001, at Rosenborg BK, but was loaned out to Sogndal in the last half of the 2001 season. He made one appearance for the Norwegian national team, against South Korea in 1997.

He has currently a dual role as both a junior team coach for Rosenborg, and as goalkeeper coach for the Norwegian national team.

He is the father of Michael Jamtfall, who is a former footballer who played as a winger.
