= Michael Jamtfall =

Norwegian footballer (born 1987)

Personal information
- Full name: Michael Kleppe Jamtfall
- Date of birth: 24 March 1987 (age 39)
- Place of birth: Trondheim, Norway
- Height: 1.83 m (6 ft 0 in)
- Positions: Right winger; striker

Youth career
- National
- Astor

Senior career*
Years	Team	Apps	(Gls)
2005–2012	Rosenborg	18	(3)
2009–2010	→ Ranheim (loan)	16	(1)
2014–2016	Trygg/Lade	14	(7)

International career
2004	Norway U17	2	(0)
2005	Norway U18	9	(1)
2006	Norway U19	1	(0)
2007	Norway U21	2	(0)
- * Club domestic league appearances and goals

Michael Kleppe Jamtfall (born 24 March 1987) is a Norwegian former professional footballer who played for Rosenborg from 2005 to 2012. Jamtfall spent parts of 2009 and 2010 on loan at Ranheim. After suffering from injuries throughout his career, he retired from top-level football in 2012 at the age of 25.

Jamtfall played as a striker, although he was also used as a right winger or as a wingback in his career. Jamtfall played for Norway at youth international level. He is the son of Jørn Jamtfall.

== Club career ==
Jamtfall was born in Trondheim and started to play football for the local clubs National and Astor before he joined Rosenborg at the age of 15. Jamtfall played as a right wing for Rosenborg's U19 team and together with players like Alexander Tettey, Andreas Nordvik, Aksel Berget Skjølsvik and Per Ciljan Skjelbred the team won the Norwegian Youth Cup in 2005 and Jamtfall scored one of the goals when Rosenborg won 4–0 against Lyn in the final.

Jamtfall made his debut for the senior team in the first round of the 2005 Norwegian Cup against Orkla and joined Rosenborg's first-team squad after the 2005 season. In January 2006, FK Bodø/Glimt wanted to get Jamtfall on a season-long loan deal as a replacement for Trond Olsen on the left wing. Bodø/Glimt's offer were accepted by Rosenborg, but Jamtfall turned the First Division side down, because he wanted to stay at Rosenborg and wait for his chances for the first-team. Jamtfall made his debut in Tippeligaen in Rosenborg's match against Start on 23 July 2006, when he replaced Daniel Braaten in the 88th minute and assisted Yssouf Koné's goal two minutes later. One week later Jamtfall came on as a substitute for Øyvind Storflor after 68 minutes and scored his first league-goal when Lillestrøm was beaten 3–1 in Knut Tørum's first match as head coach of Rosenborg. Jamtfall made four appearances as a substitute in the 2006 season which was enough to get a medal when Rosenborg won Tippeligaen.

Jamtfall made three more appearances as a substitute in the next season, before he started his first league-match on 4 August 2007 against Stabæk. One month later he sustained a knee-injury while playing for Rosenborg's reserve team against Skarp, which put him out of play until May 2008. While recovering from his injury, Jamtfall suffered another injury and was out of play until September 2008, and made his comeback in the UEFA Cup match against Valencia on 27 November 2008. Jamtfall later signed a new contract with Rosenborg to the end of the 2009 season.

After not playing any matches for Rosenborg in 2009, Jamtfall was loaned out to Ranheim in August 2009. Jamtfall signed a new one-year-long contract with Rosenborg in January 2010, and was again loaned out to Ranheim. After playing 16 matches and scoring one goal for Ranheim in the First Division, Rosenborg decided to call Jamtfall back from loan, nine hours before the transfer window closed on 31 August 2010. Ranheim's head coach Per Joar Hansen and assistant coach Otto Ulseth was not happy with the loss of one of their best players in the last minute, and claimed that Rosenborg had no respect for their club. Jamtfall started Rosenborg's next match against Viking where he also scored a goal, and made four more appearances when Rosenborg won the league under Nils Arne Eggen's command.

The 2011 season started well for Jamtfall and he was a regular in head coach Jan Jönsson's starting line-up, but in a cup-match against Verdal on 11 May 2011 Jamtfall was again injured and had to undergo a knee surgery, which was the third time in four years. Jamtfall was aiming to make a comeback in the summer of 2013, but in May 2012 he decide to retire from football at the age of 25. He stated that he lacked motivation because of all the injuries, and said that "I've won the league and played in Europe with Rosenborg, now it's time to focus on life outside football". He played 18 league-matches where he scored three goals and a total of 31 matches and five goals for Rosenborg.

== International career ==
Jamtfall played two matches for the Norway under-17 team in 2004, and the next year he scored one goal in nine matches for the under-18 team. After playing one match for the under-19 team in 2006, he played his two last matches for Norway in 2007 when he represented the under-21 team.

== Personal life ==
Michael Jamtfall is the son of Jørn Jamtfall who played as a goalkeeper for Rosenborg and was capped once for Norway.

== Career statistics ==
Appearances and goals by club, season and competition
Club	Season	Division	League		Cup		Total	
Club	Season	Division	Apps	Goals	Apps	Goals	Apps	Goals
Rosenborg	2005	Tippeligaen	0	0	1	0	1	0
Rosenborg	2006	Tippeligaen	4	1	1	0	5	1
Rosenborg	2007	Tippeligaen	5	0	1	0	6	0
Rosenborg	2008	Tippeligaen	0	0	0	0	0	0
Rosenborg	2009	Tippeligaen	0	0	0	0	0	0
Rosenborg	2010	Tippeligaen	5	1	0	0	5	1
Rosenborg	2011	Tippeligaen	4	1	2	2	6	3
Rosenborg	2012	Tippeligaen	0	0	0	0	0	0
Rosenborg	Total		18	3	5	2	23	5
Ranheim (loan)	2009	Second Division						
Ranheim (loan)	2010	Adeccoligaen	16	1	4	0	20	1
Ranheim (loan)	Total							
Career total			34	4	9	2	43	6

== Honours ==
Rosenborg

- Tippeligaen: 2006, 2010
