= Vadim Demidov =

Norwegian footballer (born 1986)

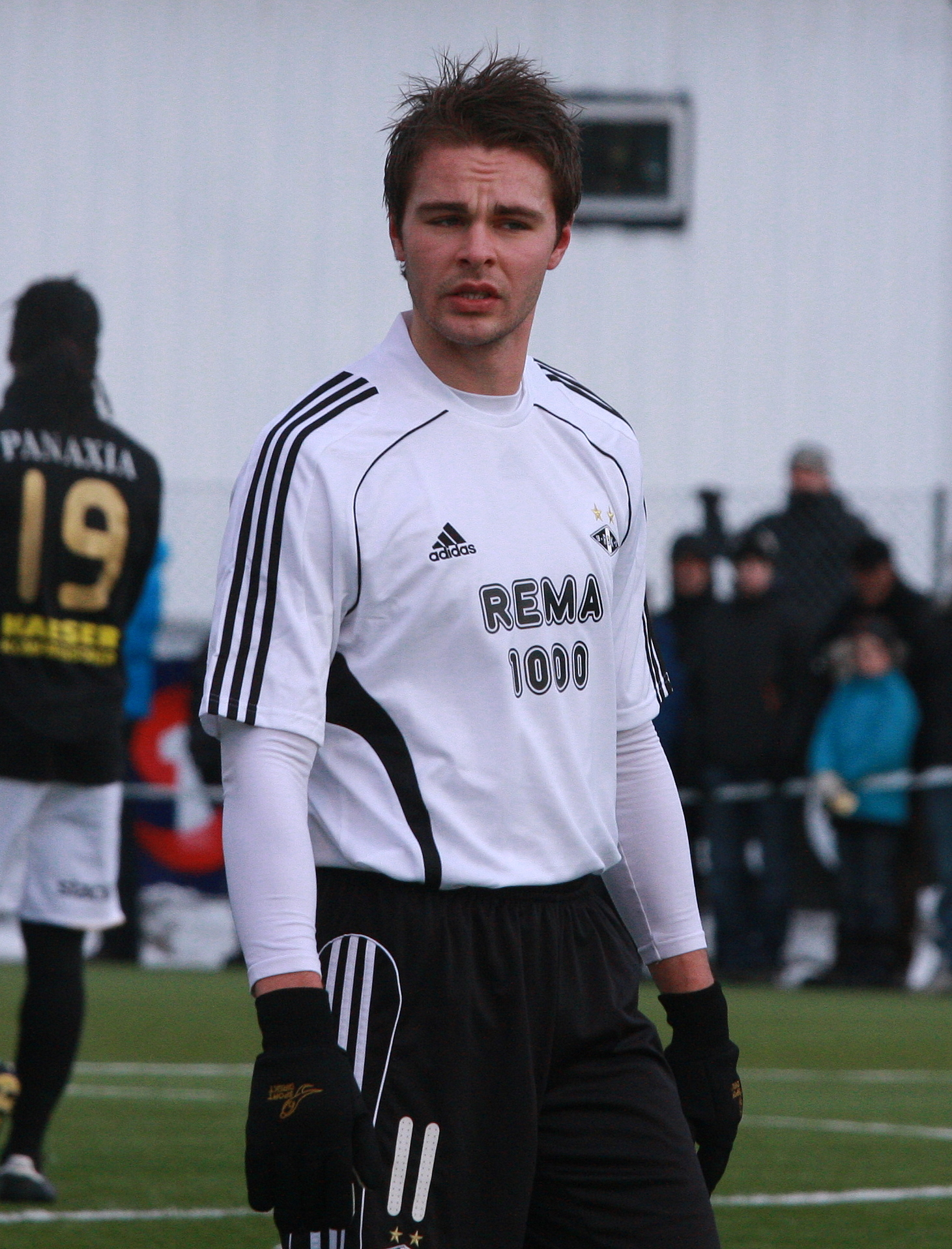
- Demidov playing for Rosenborg in 2010

Personal information
- Full name: Vadim Sergeievich Demidov
- Date of birth: 10 October 1986 (age 40)
- Place of birth: Riga, Latvian Soviet Socialist Republic
- Height: 1.85 m (6 ft 1 in)
- Position: Centre-back

Youth career
- 2001–2004: Runar

Senior career*
Years	Team	Apps	(Gls)
2004–2006	Sandefjord	1	(0)
2006	→ Manglerud Star (loan)	30	(2)
2007	Hønefoss	27	(0)
2008–2010	Rosenborg	79	(4)
2011–2012	Real Sociedad	36	(0)
2012–2013	Eintracht Frankfurt	5	(0)
2013	→ Celta Vigo (loan)	12	(0)
2013	Anzhi Makhachkala	0	(0)
2014–2016	Brann	56	(2)
2017	Minnesota United	3	(0)
2018–2019	Stabæk	40	(1)
Total		289	(9)

International career
2008–2014	Norway	16	(0)
- * Club domestic league appearances and goals

Vadim Sergeievich Demidov (Russian: Вадим Серге́евич Демидов; born 10 October 1986) is a Norwegian retired international footballer who played as a central defender.

== Early life ==
Demidov was born in Riga, Latvian Soviet Socialist Republic, Soviet Union, and is of Russian ethnicity. His father is handball player Sergei Demidov (1961–2020), who played internationally for the Soviet Union and later became a coach in Norway; the family moved to Sandefjord in 1989.

As a youngster, Demidov played both football and handball for Runar and was a big talent in both sports. When he was 15 his father told him that he had to choose between the two sports, and Demidov decided to quit handball; in an interview with FHM in 2011, he claimed that he could have been one of the top three handballers in the world if he had continued playing handball, but that he did not want to walk in his father's footsteps.

== Club career ==
Demidov turned professional in 2004 when he joined Sandefjord Fotball, and made his debut for the club in the First Division when he came on as a substitute for Magne Sturød after 87 minutes in the opening match of the 2004 season against Hødd. Demidov was then injured for a year and after spending the second half of the 2005 campaign on loan at 2. divisjon side Fram Larvik, he returned to Sandefjord who had won promotion to the Tippeligaen, with the team subsequently telling the player that the best thing for him would be to join another club.

Demidov spent the 2006 season on loan with Manglerud Star when the club was relegated from the First Division. Ahead of the 2006 season, he lacked motivation to continue with football, but later stated that the year with Manglerud Star was the turning point in his career.

Demidov joined Hønefoss for the 2007 campaign, despite being wanted by top flight's Strømsgodset. He played regularly for the club in the First Division before moving to Rosenborg ahead of the 2008 season. In Trondheim he became first-choice centre-back from the beginning playing alongside Kris Stadsgaard, and was a part of the team that lost only one of 60 matches en route to winning two straight league championships, in 2009 and 2010. Demidov played a total of 79 league-matches, scoring four goals during his three seasons with the club.

In July 2010, as his contract was approaching its end, Demidov signed a three-year deal with Spanish club Real Sociedad, effective as of January of the following year. He made his La Liga debut on 29 January 2011, replacing French Antoine Griezmann in the last minutes of a 2–0 home win against UD Almería. All his other 12 appearances in the season were starts, as the Basque team narrowly avoided relegation.

Demidov joined Eintracht Frankfurt in July 2012, signing a three-year contract. He made his first appearance in a 2–0 loss against Borussia Mönchengladbach on 7 October 2012. He played a total of five matches in the Bundesliga before he returned to Spain and joined Celta Vigo in January 2013, on loan until the end of 2012–13 season. He appeared in his first match on 12 January, playing the full 90 minutes in a 1–0 defeat at Espanyol. After Paco Herrera was replaced by Abel Resino as manager of Celta, Demidov did not play much and stated in June 2013 that he did not want to continue his career in Celta even though the club had an option to buy. On 3 July, his contract with Eintracht Frankfurt which still ran until June 2015 was dissolved by mutual consent.

Demidov signed for Anzhi Makhachkala in September 2013. After only two appearances for Anzhi, Demidov moved to SK Brann in January 2014, signing a three-year contract.

On 10 January 2017, Demidov officially signed with Minnesota United in MLS. On 28 February head coach Adrian Heath named Demidov captain for Minnesota United's first MLS season. After one season with the club, Minnesota bought out Demidov's contract on 28 February 2018. The Loons conceded 16 goals in the 3 games in which he played. He signed with Stabæk ahead of their 2018 season. He retired at the end of 2019.

After retiring, he revealed in 2020 that he would become a football agent.

== International career ==
Demidov made his debut for Norway on 28 May 2008, replacing Jan Gunnar Solli after 76 minutes in a friendly match with Uruguay. In October the Russian Football Union checked the possibilities for the player to appear for Russia, the country of his parents; when Norway manager Egil Olsen chose Morten Fevang ahead of him for the 2010 FIFA World Cup qualifying matches against Montenegro and Netherlands in June 2009, however, he admitted that he would consider playing for Russia if he did not get more chances for Norway.

Demidov played his second international in a friendly against Slovakia on 3 March 2010, and featured heavily in the country's UEFA Euro 2012 qualifying campaign, in an eventual third-place finish in Group H.

== Personal life ==
He is married to the Norwegian hurdler, Christina Vukicevic.

== Career statistics ==
Appearances and goals by club, season and competition
Club	Season	League			Cup		Europe		Total	
Club	Season	Division	Apps	Goals	Apps	Goals	Apps	Goals	Apps	Goals
Sandefjord	2004	1. divisjon	1	0	1	0	—		2	0
Sandefjord	2005	1. divisjon	0	0	0	0	—		0	0
Sandefjord	Total		1	0	1	0	—	—	2	0
Manglerud Star (loan)	2006	1. divisjon	30	2	3	2	—		33	4
Hønefoss	2007	1. divisjon	27	0	1	0	—		28	0
Rosenborg	2008	Tippeligaen	25	1	1	0	9	0	35	1
Rosenborg	2009	Tippeligaen	28	3	4	0	—		32	3
Rosenborg	2010	Tippeligaen	26	0	2	0	12	1	40	1
Rosenborg	Total		79	4	7	0	21	1	107	5
Real Sociedad	2010–11	La Liga	13	0	0	0	—		13	0
Real Sociedad	2011–12	La Liga	23	0	0	0	—		23	0
Real Sociedad	Total		36	0	0	0	—	—	36	0
Eintracht Frankfurt	2012–13	Bundesliga	5	0	0	0	—		5	0
Celta de Vigo (loan)	2012–13	La Liga	12	0	0	0	—		12	0
Anzhi Makhachkala	2013–14	Russian Premier League	0	0	1	0	1	0	2	0
Brann	2014	Tippeligaen	5	0	0	0	0	0	5	0
Brann	2015	1. divisjon	25	1	1	0	—		26	1
Brann	2016	Tippeligaen	26	1	0	0	—		26	1
Brann	Total		56	2	1	0	—	—	57	2
Minnesota United	2017	Major League Soccer	3	0	0	0	—		3	0
Stabæk	2018	Eliteserien	25	1	1	0	—		26	1
Stabæk	2019	Eliteserien	15	0	0	0	—		15	0
Stabæk	Total		40	1	1	0	—	—	41	1
Career total			289	9	15	2	22	1	323	12

== Honours ==
Rosenborg

- Tippeligaen: 2009, 2010
