= Michael Hansson (footballer) =

Swedish footballer

Personal information
- Date of birth: 22 January 1972 (age 54)
- Position: Midfielder

Senior career*
Years	Team	Apps	(Gls)
1990–1993	BK Olympic		
1994–1999	Trelleborgs FF		
2000–2003	Helsingborgs IF		
2004	Kristianstads FF		

International career
2000	Sweden	1	(0)
- * Club domestic league appearances and goals

Michael Hansson (born 22 January 1972) is a Swedish retired football midfielder.
