= Mats Wejsfelt =

Swedish footballer

Personal information
- Full name: Mats Anders Wejsfelt
- Date of birth: 5 December 1980 (age 45)
- Place of birth: Löddeköpinge, Sweden
- Height: 1.86 m (6 ft 1 in)
- Position: Defender

Youth career
- IF Lödde

Senior career*
Years	Team	Apps	(Gls)
2000–2001	Helsingborgs IF	0	(0)
2002	IFK Malmö	24	(0)
2003	SV Babelsberg 03	0	(0)
2003–2004	Trelleborgs FF	6	(0)
2004–2006	FC Sachsen Leipzig	52	(4)
2006–2009	1. FC Magdeburg	74	(3)
2010	VfB Germania Halberstadt	3	(0)
2010–2012	Schönebecker SC 1861	45	(8)
2012–2013	Haldensleber SC	25	(2)
2013–2014	Tennis Borussia Berlin	14	(2)
- * Club domestic league appearances and goals

Mats Anders Wejsfelt (born 5 December 1980 in Löddeköpinge) is a Swedish retired footballer who last played for Tennis Borussia Berlin.

== Club career ==
Wejsfelt's first senior club was Helsingborgs IF in 2000. He was in the squad several times, but did not play a match in the Allsvenskan. He moved to second-tier club IFK Malmö where he got into the first team and played in 24 Superettan matches.

In January 2003, Wejsfelt moved to Germany for the first time, spending half a year with SV Babelsberg 03. In June, Wejsfelt moved back to Sweden, where he made six Superettan appearances for Trelleborgs FF. Wejsfelt moved to Germany again in 2004, to NOFV-Oberliga club FC Sachsen Leipzig where he spent the next two years. At the start of the 2006–07 season, Wejsfelt signed for 1. FC Magdeburg who had just been promoted to the third-tier Regionalliga Nord. He quickly became a regular starter for his new club, making 74 league appearances over three seasons, featuring in two DFB-Pokal games too. After three further years at lower-league Saxony-Anhalt teams, he signed for Tennis Borussia Berlin for the 2013–14 season, making 14 appearances and scoring two goals in the first half of the season. After not playing a game in 2014 due to injury, he subsequently retired.
