= Rade Prica =

Swedish footballer (born 1980)

Personal information
- Full name: Rade Stanislav Prica
- Date of birth: 30 June 1980 (age 46)
- Place of birth: Ljungby, Sweden
- Height: 1.85 m (6 ft 1 in)
- Position: Striker

Youth career
- Ljungby IF

Senior career*
Years	Team	Apps	(Gls)
1995–1997	Ljungby	37	(14)
1998–2002	Helsingborg	74	(27)
2002–2006	Hansa Rostock	113	(20)
2006–2008	AaB	48	(28)
2008–2009	Sunderland	6	(1)
2009–2012	Rosenborg	104	(57)
2013–2015	Maccabi Tel Aviv	62	(24)
2015	Helsingborg	9	(2)
2016	Maccabi Petah Tikva	10	(3)
2016	Landskrona BoIS	9	(4)
Total		472	(180)

International career
1995–1997	Sweden U17	31	(5)
1998–1999	Sweden U19	21	(4)
1999–2001	Sweden U21	13	(5)
2001–2008	Sweden	14	(2)
- * Club domestic league appearances and goals

Rade Stanislav Prica (born 30 June 1980) is a Swedish former professional footballer who played as a striker. He is the only player who has won league championships in the three Scandinavian countries – Sweden, Denmark and Norway. He also played in the Bundesliga, the Premier League, and the Israeli Premier League during a career that spanned between 1995 and 2016. A full international between 2001 and 2008, he won 14 caps and scored two goals for the Sweden national team.

== Club career ==
=== Early career ===
Prica started his footballing career as a youth player for Ljungby, he then made his way into the first team, making 37 appearances and scoring 14 goals, over a period of three seasons.

After leaving Ljungby, Prica signed for renowned Swedish club Helsingborg in 1998, he then went on to play for them for five seasons playing 73 times scoring 27 goals, Prica then moved to German team Hansa Rostock.

Prica signed for Aalborg BK in 2006 after being released by Hansa Rostock, During the 2006–07 season, he was topscorer in the Danish Superliga scoring 19 goals.

=== Sunderland ===
Sunderland completed the signing of Prica on 23 January 2008 for a fee of more than £2 million on a three-and-a-half-year contract.

He scored on his debut for at Sunderland against Birmingham City on 29 January 2008, and missed out in scoring a second with referee Mark Halsey ruling it out for handball.

Prica came on as a substitute for Kieran Richardson in a League game against Liverpool at Anfield after just 7 minutes, but was then substituted himself after 56 minutes.

Prica was rarely featured in the Sunderland squad. In January 2009, official sources with the club acknowledged that he was sought by two unnamed British clubs and a European club, rumored to be his previous Danish club Aalborg BK.

Prica was given limited opportunities by Sunderland and did not start a game. It was reported on Sky Sports that Prica had been made available for loan.

=== Rosenborg ===
On 9 March 2009, Prica signed a four-year deal with Rosenborg for £2.3 million. He became the top scorer in the Norwegian top division in the 2009 season, scoring 17 goals in 27 appearances. On 10 April 2011, round three of the 2011 Tippeligaen, Prica scored all four goals for Rosenborg in a 4–4 draw with Lillestrøm SK.

=== Later career ===
On 9 January 2013, it was reported Prica had agreed terms with Maccabi Tel Aviv in the Israeli Premier League. Prica signed in January 2013. Since his arrival to the club he has been very appreciated by either the Israeli fans and media, and had an instant impact for Maccabi Tel Aviv, scoring 8 goals in his first 18 appearances.

On 11 August 2015, he returned to Helsingborg.

== International career ==
Having represented the Sweden U17, U19, and U21 teams, Prica made his full international debut for the Sweden national team on 10 February 2001 in a friendly 4–1 win against Thailand when he played for 66 minutes before being replaced by Martin Åslund. He scored his first goal for Sweden on 18 January 2007 in a friendly 1–2 loss against Ecuador. He made his first and only competitive appearance for Sweden on 8 September 2007 in a UEFA Euro 2008 qualifier against Denmark, coming on a substitute for Zlatan Ibrahimović in the 88th minute of a 0–0 draw. In total, Prica won 14 caps and scored two goals during an international career that spanned between 2001 and 2008.

== Personal life ==
Prica's father is a Serb and his mother is a Croat. Prica's son, Tim Prica, is also a professional footballer. His nephew, Pierre Engvall is a professional hockey player currently employed by the Toronto Maple Leafs of the National Hockey League.

== Career statistics ==
=== Club ===
As of 11 November 2016

Appearances and goals by club, season and competition
Club	Season	League			Cup		Europe		Total	
Club	Season	Division	Apps	Goals	Apps	Goals	Apps	Goals	Apps	Goals
Ljungby IF	1995	Division 3	6	1	0	0	0	0	6	1
Ljungby IF	1996	Division 2	20	5	0	0	0	0	20	5
Ljungby IF	1997	Division 3	11	8	0	0	0	0	11	8
Ljungby IF	Total		37	14	0	0	0	0	37	14
Helsingborg	1998	Allsvenskan	1	0	0	0	0	0	1	0
Helsingborg	1999	Allsvenskan	18	6	0	0	0	0	18	6
Helsingborg	2000	Allsvenskan	24	11	0	0	5	1	29	12
Helsingborg	2001	Allsvenskan	25	7	0	0	3	0	28	7
Helsingborg	2002	Allsvenskan	6	3	0	0	0	0	6	3
Helsingborg	Total		74	27	0	0	8	1	82	28
Hansa Rostock	2002–03	Bundesliga	27	7	3	0	0	0	30	7
Hansa Rostock	2003–04	Bundesliga	28	3	0	0	0	0	28	3
Hansa Rostock	2004–05	Bundesliga	29	6	4	1	0	0	33	7
Hansa Rostock	2005–06	2. Bundesliga	29	4	2	1	0	0	31	5
Hansa Rostock	Total		113	20	9	2	0	0	122	22
Aalborg	2006–07	Superliga	32	19	0	0	0	0	32	19
Aalborg	2007–08	Superliga	16	9	0	0	5	2	21	11
Aalborg	Total		48	28	0	0	5	2	53	30
Sunderland	2007–08	Premier League	6	1	0	0	0	0	6	1
Sunderland	2008–09	Premier League	0	0	0	0	0	0	0	0
Sunderland	Total		6	1	0	0	0	0	6	1
Rosenborg	2009	Tippeligaen	28	17	3	0	2	0	33	17
Rosenborg	2010	Tippeligaen	23	13	3	0	11	3	37	16
Rosenborg	2011	Tippeligaen	27	16	5	2	6	2	38	20
Rosenborg	2012	Tippeligaen	26	11	3	2	12	1	41	14
Rosenborg	Total		104	57	14	4	31	6	149	67
Maccabi Tel Aviv	2012–13	Ligat Winner	18	8	2	0	0	0	20	8
Maccabi Tel Aviv	2013–14	Ligat Winner	30	12	0	0	10	0	40	12
Maccabi Tel Aviv	2014–15	Ligat Winner	17	5	2	4	5	2	24	11
Maccabi Tel Aviv	Total		65	25	4	4	15	2	84	31
Helsingborg	2015	Allsvenskan	9	2	1	2	0	0	10	4
Maccabi Petah Tikva	2015–16	Ligat Winner	10	3	1	0	0	0	11	3
Landskrona BoIS	2016	Division 1	9	4	0	0	0	0	9	4
Career total			475	181	29	12	59	11	563	204

=== International ===
Appearances and goals by national team and year
National team	Year	Apps	Goals
Sweden	2001	2	0
Sweden	2002	1	0
Sweden	2003	2	0
Sweden	2004	1	0
Sweden	2005	0	0
Sweden	2006	0	0
Sweden	2007	6	2
Sweden	2008	2	0
Total		14	2

Scores and results list Sweden's goal tally first, score column indicates score after each Prica goal.

List of international goals scored by Rade Prica
No.	Date	Venue	Opponent	Score	Result	Competition	Ref.
1	18 January 2007	Estadio Alejandro Serrano Aguilar, Cuenca, Ecuador	Ecuador	1–2	1–2	Friendly	
2	12 September 2007	Podgorica City Stadium, Podgorica, Montenegro	Montenegro	2–1	2–1	Friendly	

== Honours ==
Helsingborgs IF

- Allsvenskan: 1999

Aalborg

- Danish Superliga: 2007–08

Rosenborg

- Tippeligaen: 2009, 2010

Maccabi Tel Aviv

- Israeli Premier League: 2012–13, 2013–14, 2014–15
- Israel State Cup: 2014–15
- Toto Cup: 2014–15

Maccabi Petah Tikva

- Toto Cup: 2015–16

Individual

- Danish Superliga top scorer: 2006–07
- Tippeligaen top scorer: 2009
- Kniksen award: 2009
