= Kris Stadsgaard =

Danish footballer (born 1985)

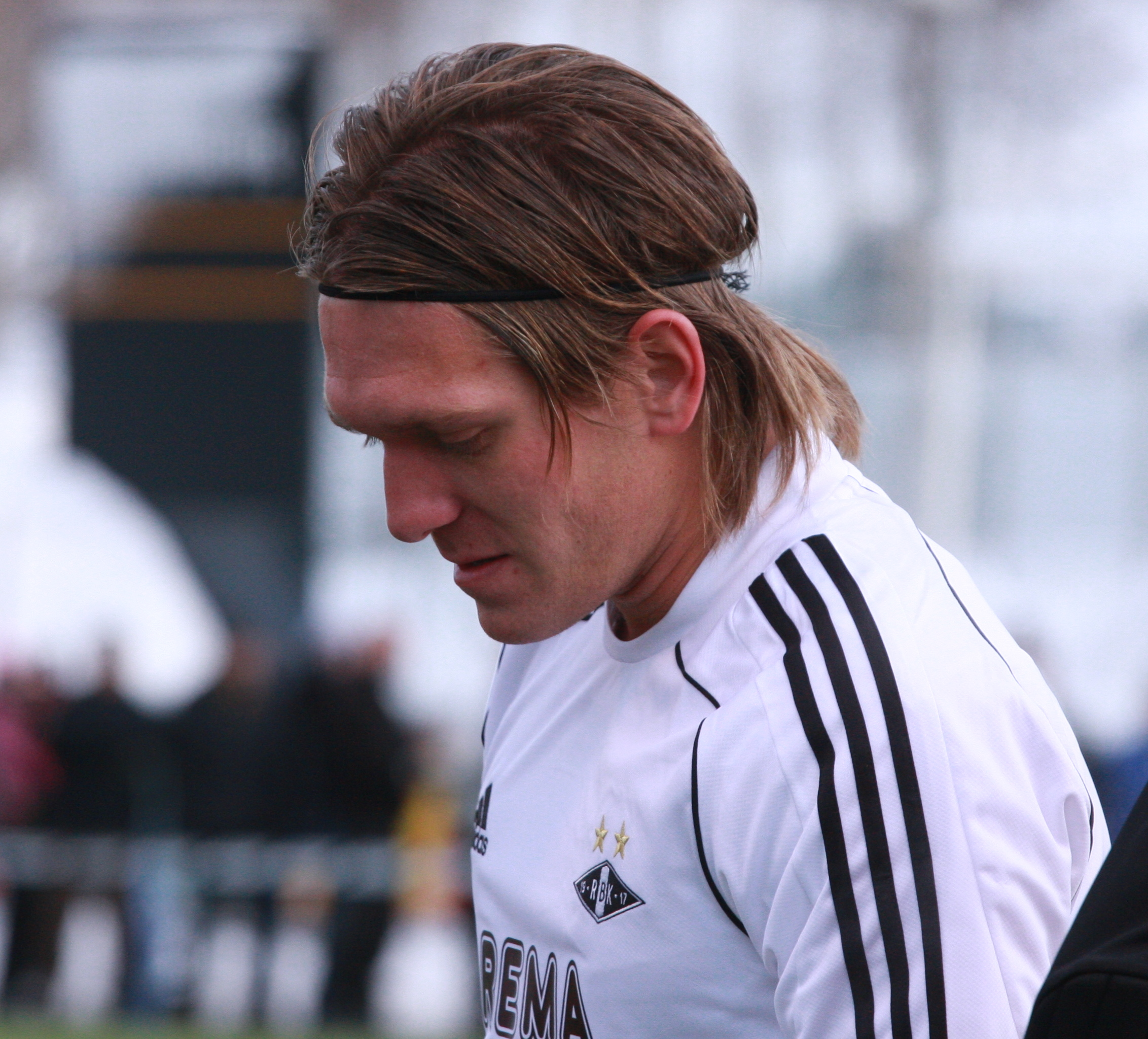
- Stadsgaard for Rosenborg, 2010

Personal information
- Date of birth: 1 August 1985 (age 41)
- Place of birth: Copenhagen, Denmark
- Height: 1.85 m (6 ft 1 in)
- Position: Centre-back

Youth career
- Farum

Senior career*
Years	Team	Apps	(Gls)
2003	Farum	1	(0)
2003–2007	Nordsjælland	41	(0)
2007–2008	Reggina	5	(0)
2008–2010	Rosenborg	55	(0)
2010–2012	Málaga	25	(1)
2012–2016	Copenhagen	56	(2)
Total		183	(3)

International career
2005	Denmark U20	2	(0)
2009–2013	Denmark	3	(0)
- * Club domestic league appearances and goals

Kris Stadsgaard (born 1 August 1985) is a Danish former professional footballer who played as a central defender. He made one senior appearance in 2003 for Farum before the club changed its name to Nordsjælland. He signed with Italian club Reggina in August 2007 and left the club in March 2008 for Rosenborg in Norway, winning two Norwegian Premier League championships in three seasons there. After 1.5 years with Spanish club Málaga he returned to Denmark with Copenhagen in January 2012. He made three appearances for the Denmark national team.

He is the son of former Danish football referee Knud Stadsgaard.

== Club career ==
=== Farum and Nordsjælland ===
Born in Copenhagen, Denmark, Stadsgaard began his career at Farum, where he started his career since joining them in 2001 and progressed through the ranks.

Stadsgaard made his Danish Superliga debut for Farum in the 2002–03 Danish Superliga season, playing alongside Rasmus Marvits in central–defence position, in a 5–1 loss against Silkeborg on 28 April 2003. At the end of the season, he signed a two–year contract extension, keeping him until 2005. He stayed with the team when Farum BK changed its name to Nordsjælland in summer 2003.

After making five appearances in the 2003–04 season, Stadsgaard had a first team chance following the injury of the club's captain Jacob Rasmussen and from that moment on, Stadsgaard managed to play his way into the Nordsjælland team in the 2004–05 season. As the 2004–05 season progressed, he went on to make twenty–one appearances in all competitions. As a result of his performance, Stadsgaard was rewarded with a contract extension, signing a four–year contract.

However, Stadgaard's first team opportunities was limited for the next two seasons, as he suffered injuries and made eight appearances as a result.

In the 2007–08 season, Stadsgaard was given a handful of first appearances and since the start of the season, he went on to make six appearances.

=== Reggina ===
In August 2012 Stadsgaard signed with Italian Serie A team Reggina who paid a transfer fee of 10 million DKK (€1.5 million) to Nordsjælland, including him in their squad for the 2007–08 season. After the move, he was joined by compatriot Mike Tullberg.

On 15 September 2007, Stadsgaard made his debut for the club in a 2–1 defeat to Roma. However, Stadsgaard soon struggled in the first team, as he appeared mostly on the substitute and was told by the club's sporting director, Riccardo Bigon, to open up his personality, to integrate better into the squad. By January, both Stadsgaard and Tullberg were dropped from the squad and never played for the club again. He rejected an opportunity to leave the club in January when he refused to be loaned out, leading both the club and him fell out.

Following his move to Rosenberg, Stadsgaard expressed regret moving to Reggina and admitted money was a factor as the reason he joined them.

=== Rosenborg ===
After staying at Reggina for eight months, Stadsgaard ended his stay there when he signed for Norwegian club Rosenborg on 29 March 2008 for approximately 4 million NOK, signing a four–year contract. It came after when his father, Knud, confirmed that Rosenborg expressed interest signing him.

On 7 April 2008, Stadsgaard made his Rosenborg debut, where he came on as a second-half substitute, in a 3–2 kiss against Strømsgodset. From that moment, Stadsgaard became a first team regular since his debut until he suffered an injury in early–June. Unfortunately, while rehabilitating his injury, it was delayed for another month. After returning to the first team in late–August, Stadsgaard then suffered another injury that kept him out for the rest of the season during a UEFA match against Club Brugge. At the end of the 2008 season, Stadsgaard finished his first season, making sixteen appearances in all competitions.

In the 2009 season, Stadsgaard missed the start of the season, due to rehabilitating his knee injury and it was not until on 3 May 2009 when he made his return to the first team from injury, in a 1–0 win against Fredrikstad. From that moment on, Stadsgaard regained his first team place since returning from injury and his performance earned him a national called up. In 2009, Stadsgaard was featured for most of the season, although he appeared on the substitute bench on three occasion and sidelined with suspension. Despite this, Stadsgaard helped Rosenberg win the league and went on to make twenty–five appearances in all competitions.

In 2010 season, Stadsgaard started the season well when he scored his first Rosenborg goal, in a 3–1 win over Aalesunds to win the Superfinalen trophy, which turned out to be the last edition. Since the start of the 2010 season, Stadsgaard established himself in the first team and went on to make twenty–one appearances in all competitions. His performance in the summer attracted interests, including Copenhagen. Amid the transfer speculation, he made his last appearance for Rosenborg on 29 August 2010, in a 3–2 win over Start. Despite his departure, the club went on to win the league for the second time this season.

During his time with the club, Rosenborg won the 2009 and 2010 Norwegian Premier League championships, as well as the 2010 Superfinalen trophy.

=== Málaga ===
On 31 August 2010, Stadsgaard left Rosenborg to sign a three-year contract with Málaga of the Spanish La Liga for an undisclosed fee, although the move was reported to be 11 million NOK. Upon joining the club, Stadsgaard revealed that there were interests from other club but insisted Málaga was his first choice.

Stadsgaard made his La Liga debut for Málaga, playing the whole game on 12 September 2010 against Real Zaragoza, which saw them win 5–3. In the next game against Sevilla on 19 September 2010, Stadsgaard set up a goal for Salomón Rondón, which saw Málaga lose 2–1. He scored his first goal for Málaga on 16 October 2010, in a 1–4 home loss against Real Madrid. However, as the 2010–11 season progressed, Stadsgaard spent the rest of the season on the substitute bench and his own injury concerns following the arrival of Martín Demichelis, as well as, his own injury concern. Despite this, Stadsgaard finished the season, making twenty–five appearances and scoring once in all competitions.

Ahead of the 2011–12 season, Stadsgaard was linked a return move to his homeland, with Copenhagen keen on signing him, which was denied Stadsgaard, himself. In the 2011–12 season, Stadsgaard suffered a setback when he had a venous occlusion on his left leg and was sidelined for two months. Although he appeared on as an unused substitute, Stadsgaard was expected to leave the club in the January transfer window, with Copenhagen confirmed their interests once again. In January 2012, they made an approach from Malaga of signing him, leading to negotiations soon after.

=== Copenhagen ===
On 23 January 2012, Málaga broke the news that they were parting with Stadsgaard in their website. After his release from Spain, Stadsgaard signed for Danish side Copenhagen, returning to his homeland and played his first Danish club for the first time since 2007.

Upon arriving at Copenhagen, Stadsgaard was given the captaincy. Stadsgaard made his Copenhagen debut on 4 March 2012, where he made his first start, in a 1–1 draw against AaB. Since making his debut, Stadsgaard managed to dispatch a first team place from Ragnar Sigurðsson. However, Stadsgaard suffered an injury that kept him out for two weeks. Following his return, he managed to regain his first team place, but was involved in an incident with manager Carsten V. Jensen after Stadsgaard reportedly told him to shut up following a 2–2 draw against SønderjyskE. Although the club was unsuccessful to win the league later in the season, Stadsgaard finished the half season at Copenhagen, making fourteen appearances in all competitions. Despite this, Stadsgaard helped the side win the Danish Cup nevertheless.

In the 2012–13 season, Stadsgaard appeared on the substitute bench for the first two league matches, due to new manager Ariël Jacobs preferring Sigurðsson and Sölvi Ottesen. After appearing on the substitute bench for the next two matches once more between 25 August 2012 and 2 September 2012, Stadsgaard returned to the first team on 15 September 2012, where he set up a goal for Igor Vetokele to score an equaliser, in a 2–1 win over Nordsjælland. On 21 October 2012, he scored his first Copenhagen goal, in a 1–0 win over Brøndby and then scored again two weeks later, on 3 November 2012, in a 2–0 win over Aarhus GF. As the 2012–13 season progressed, Stadsgaard helped the club win the league this season and went on to make thirty–eight appearances and scoring two times in all competitions.

In the 2013–14 season, Stadsgaard found his first team place at the club under threat following the arrival of Olof Mellberg. However, he soon lost his first team place, resulting him on the substitute bench, as well as, his own injury concern. Following his recovery from injury, Stadsgaard was given a handful of first team appearances for the rest of the season following the sale of Sigurðsson and Ottesen. Despite suffering from injury later on, he went on to make twenty–two appearances in all competitions in the 2013–14 season.

The 2014–15 season saw Stadsgaard switched shirt from four to thirteen instead following the arrival of Per Nilsson. However, at the start of the 2014–15 season, Stadsgaard suffered a knee injury and required surgery as a result. Because of this, Stadsgaard never made an appearance in the 2014–15 season, as his recovery was delayed on numerous occasion.

In the 2015–16 season, Stadsgaard continued to recover his knee injury since the start of the last season. By mid–August, he returned from injury and appeared as an unused substitute on three occasion throughout August. However, once again, Stadsgaard suffered another injury again, as well as, competitions and never appeared in the first team for the rest of the season. While recovering from injury, Stadsgaard's future at Copenhagen was in doubt after he was left out of the training camp in Dubai. At the end of the 2015–16 season, Stadsgaard's release by the club was confirmed. Because of his ongoing battle with injury, Stadsgaard announced his retirement from football.

While spending two seasons on the sidelines with injuries, the club won both the league and the cup consecutively.

== International career ==
In 2005, Stadsgaard played two matches for the Denmark under 20 team.

Four years on, Stadsgaard was called up by the senior national team for the first time. On 12 August 2009, he debuted for the Denmark national team against Chile. Playing out of position as a left back, he was directly involved in Chile's second goal, only a minute after his entrance. Despite the error, Rosenberg then Manager Erik Hamrén hoped that Stadsgaaard could be in the squad for the FIFA World Cup. However, Stadsgaard did not make the cut.

Stadsgaard was not recalled for the national team until November 2010, deputizing for the injured Bo Svensson and Simon Kjær in a friendly game against the Czech Republic. He replaced Mathias Jørgensen in the central defence at half-time, in a game that ultimately ended a 0–0 draw.

== Career statistics ==
Appearances and goals by club, season and competition
Season	Club	League			Cup		Total	
Season	Club	Division	Apps	Goals	Apps	Goals	Apps	Goals
Farum	2002–03	Danish Superliga	1	0	0	0	1	0
Nordsjælland	2003–04	Danish Superliga	5	0	0	0	5	0
Nordsjælland	2004–05	Danish Superliga	21	0	0	0	21	0
Nordsjælland	2005–06	Danish Superliga	7	0	0	0	7	0
Nordsjælland	2006–07	Danish Superliga	1	0	0	0	1	0
Nordsjælland	2007–08	Danish Superliga	6	0	0	0	6	0
Reggina	2007–08	Serie A	5	0	0	0	5	0
Rosenborg	2008	Tippeligaen	15	0	1	0	16	0
Rosenborg	2009	Tippeligaen	20	0	3	0	23	0
Rosenborg	2010	Tippeligaen	20	0	1	1	21	1
Málaga	2010–11	La Liga	25	1	0	0	25	1
Copenhagen	2011–12	Danish Superliga	11	0	3	0	14	0
Copenhagen	2012–13	Danish Superliga	27	2	11	0	38	2
Copenhagen	2013–14	Danish Superliga	18	0	4	0	22	0
Copenhagen	2014–15	Danish Superliga	0	0	0	0	0	0
Copenhagen	2015–16	Danish Superliga	0	0	0	0	5	0
Career total			169	3	5	1	174	4

== Personal life ==
Stadsgaard is engaged to his long-term girlfriend, Michella Moengaard. Stadsgaard said his girlfriend speaks Spanish and helped him to speak the language following his move to Málaga.

== Honours ==
Rosenborg

- Norwegian Premier League Championship: 2009, 2010
- Norwegian Superfinal: 2010

Copenhagen

- Danish Superliga Championship: 2012–13, 2015–16
- Danish Cup: 2011–12, 2014–15, 2015–16
