= Norwegian Volleyball Premier League 2007–08 (men) =

Norwegian volleyball league season

The 2007–08 season of the Norwegian Premier League (Norwegian: Eliteserien), the highest volleyball league for men in Norway.

== League table ==
Pos	Team	P	W	L	SetF	SetA	Pts
1	Førde	24	18	6	61	32	53
2	Nyborg	24	17	7	59	33	50
3	Tromsø	24	17	7	56	36	46
4	Oslo Volley	24	10	14	46	51	34
5	Randaberg	24	10	14	41	54	28
6	Kristiansund	24	67	17	33	58	22
7	Topp Volley	24	5	19	29	61	19

Preceded by 2006–07	Norwegian Volleyball Premier League; 2007–08	Succeeded by 2008–09
