= Norwegian Volleyball Premier League 2008–09 (men) =

Norwegian volleyball league season

The 2008–09 season of the Norwegian Premier League (Norwegian: Eliteserien), the highest volleyball league for men in Norway.

== League table ==
| Pos | Team | P | W | L | SetF | SetA | Pts |
|---|---|---|---|---|---|---|---|
| 1 | Nyborg | 24 | 23 | 1 | 70 | 14 | 68 |
| 2 | Randaberg | 24 | 20 | 4 | 60 | 18 | 59 |
| 3 | Førde | 24 | 16 | 8 | 54 | 28 | 50 |
| 4 | Oslo Volley | 24 | 10 | 14 | 37 | 49 | 28 |
| 5 | Kristiansund | 24 | 6 | 18 | 25 | 57 | 19 |
| 6 | Tromsø | 24 | 7 | 17 | 30 | 62 | 17 |
| 7 | Topp Volley | 24 | 2 | 22 | 13 | 67 | 7 |

- Before the season started, Tromsø had been deducted four points and had 0–6 in sets.

| Preceded by 2007–08 | Norwegian Volleyball Premier League; 2008–09 | Succeeded by 2009–10 |
