= Norwegian Volleyball Premier League 2009–10 (men) =

Norwegian volleyball league season

The 2009–10 season of the Norwegian Premier League (Norwegian: Eliteserien), the highest volleyball league for men in Norway.

== League table ==
Pos	Team	P	W	L	SetF	SetA	Pts
1	Nyborg	20	19	1	59	9	58
2	Førde	20	15	5	48	21	44
3	Randaberg	20	8	12	36	43	26
4	Oslo Volley	20	7	13	30	46	21
5	Kristiansund	20	8	12	30	50	19
8	Tromsø	20	3	17	21	55	12

Preceded by 2008–09	Norwegian Volleyball Premier League; 2009–10	Succeeded by 2010–11
